= List of Mid-States Football Association football standings =

This is a list of yearly Mid-States Football Association standings.

== Mid-States Football Association standings ==
=== NAIA Division I (1994–1996) ===
1994 Mid-States Football Association standings
	Conf.					Overall
Team		W		L			W		L
Mideast League
No. 3 Westminster (PA) x^	4	–	0	–	0	12	–	1	–	0
Malone	2	–	2	–	0	7	–	3	–	0
No. 16 Tiffin ^	2	–	2	–	0	8	–	4	–	0
Geneva	2	–	2	–	0	6	–	3	–	0
Urbana	0	–	4	–	0	3	–	7	–	0
Midwest League
No. 14 Trinity (IL) x^	5	–	0	–	0	7	–	3	–	1
No. 15 Findlay ^	4	–	1	–	0	6	–	4	–	0
Taylor	2	–	3	–	0	3	–	7	–	0
Olivet Nazarene	2	–	3	–	0	2	–	8	–	0
Saint Xavier	2	–	3	–	0	2	–	8	–	0
Lindenwood	0	–	5	–	0	2	–	8	–	0
x – League champion/co-champions ^ – NAIA playoff participant; Rankings from NAIA Division II poll

1995 Mid-States Football Association standings
	Conf.					Overall
Team		W		L			W		L
Mideast League
No. 6 Malone x^	3	–	0	–	1	10	–	1	–	1
No. 11 Geneva ^	3	–	1	–	0	9	–	2	–	0
Westminster (PA)	2	–	1	–	1	4	–	3	–	2
Tiffin	1	–	3	–	0	3	–	6	–	1
Urbana	0	–	4	–	0	0	–	10	–	0
Midwest League
No. 8 Findlay x^	4	–	1	–	0	10	–	1	–	2
Trinity International x	4	–	1	–	0	6	–	4	–	0
Lindenwood	2	–	3	–	0	4	–	7	–	0
Taylor	2	–	3	–	0	4	–	7	–	0
Saint Xavier	2	–	3	–	0	2	–	8	–	0
Olivet Nazarene	1	–	4	–	0	2	–	8	–	0
St. Ambrose *	0	–	0	–	0	6	–	4	–	0
Iowa Wesleyan *	0	–	0	–	0	1	–	10	–	0
x – League champion/co-champions ^ – NAIA Division playoff participant * – ineligible for championship; Rankings from NAIA Division II poll

1996 Mid-States Football Association standings
	Conf.			Overall
Team	W		L	W		L
Mideast League
No. 13 Malone x	5	–	1	8	–	2
No. 9 Westminster (PA) x^	5	–	1	9	–	3
No. 10 Geneva x^	5	–	1	7	–	3
Walsh	3	–	3	6	–	5
Tiffin	2	–	4	2	–	8
Tri-State	1	–	5	4	–	6
Urbana	0	–	6	1	–	9
Midwest League
No. 1 Findlay x^	6	–	0	12	–	1
No. 17 St. Ambrose	5	–	1	9	–	1
Olivet Nazarene	3	–	3	6	–	4
Iowa Wesleyan	3	–	3	5	–	6
Trinity International	3	–	3	3	–	7
Saint Xavier	1	–	5	2	–	8
Taylor	0	–	6	1	–	9
x – League champion/co-champions ^ – NAIA playoff participant; Rankings from NAIA Division II poll

=== NAIA (1997–present) ===
1997 Mid-States Football Association standings
	Conf.			Overall
Team	W		L	W		L
Mideast League
No. 5 Geneva x^	6	–	0	11	–	2
No. 8 Westminster (PA) ^	5	–	1	9	–	2
No. 21 Walsh	4	–	2	7	–	3
Malone	3	–	3	5	–	5
Tri-State	2	–	4	4	–	6
Tiffin	1	–	4	4	–	7
Urbana	0	–	6	0	–	10
Midwest League
No. 1 Findlay x^	6	–	0	14	–	0
No. 24 Taylor	5	–	1	7	–	3
Olivet Nazarene	4	–	2	7	–	3
St. Ambrose	3	–	3	4	–	6
Iowa Wesleyan	1	–	5	4	–	7
Saint Xavier	1	–	5	1	–	9
Trinity International	1	–	5	1	–	9
x – League champion/co-champions ^ – NAIA playoff participant; Rankings from NAIA poll

1998 Mid-States Football Association standings
	Conf.			Overall
Team	W		L	W		L
Mideast League
No. 12 Malone x^	5	–	1	7	–	4
No. 14 Tri-State ^	4	–	2	11	–	3
No. 17 Geneva	4	–	2	8	–	3
Tiffin	3	–	3	6	–	5
Walsh	2	–	4	6	–	5
Urbana	2	–	4	5	–	6
Saint Francis (IN)	1	–	5	2	–	8
Midwest League
No. 7 Taylor x^	6	–	0	8	–	3
No. 11 Olivet Nazarene ^	5	–	1	11	–	3
McKendree	3	–	3	6	–	4
St. Ambrose	2	–	4	5	–	5
Iowa Wesleyan	2	–	4	3	–	8
Trinity International	2	–	4	2	–	8
Saint Xavier	1	–	5	1	–	9
x – League champion/co-champions ^ – NAIA playoff participant; Rankings from NAIA poll

1999 Mid-States Football Association standings
	Conf.			Overall
Team	W		L	W		L
Mideast League
No. 12 Saint Francis (IN) x^	6	–	0	8	–	3
No. 19 Geneva	5	–	1	8	–	3
No. 24 Walsh	4	–	2	7	–	3
Tri-State	3	–	3	6	–	4
Tiffin	2	–	4	5	–	6
Malone	1	–	5	4	–	6
Urbana	0	–	6	1	–	10
Midwest League
No. 5 Taylor x^	5	–	1	10	–	2
No. 6 McKendree x^	5	–	1	9	–	2
No. 25 Olivet Nazarene x	5	–	1	6	–	4
Saint Xavier	3	–	3	4	–	6
St. Ambrose	2	–	4	4	–	6
Iowa Wesleyan	1	–	5	1	–	9
Trinity International	0	–	6	1	–	9
St. Francis (IL)	0	–	0	3	–	7
x – League champion/co-champions ^ – NAIA playoff participant; Rankings from NAIA Coaches' Poll

2000 Mid-States Football Association standings
	Conf.			Overall
Team	W		L	W		L
Mideast League
No. 6 Saint Francis (IN) x^	6	–	0	10	–	2
Walsh	4	–	2	6	–	5
No. 21 Geneva	3	–	3	7	–	3
Tri-State	3	–	3	6	–	5
Malone	2	–	4	4	–	7
Tiffin	2	–	4	3	–	7
Urbana	1	–	5	1	–	9
Midwest League
No. 7 St. Ambrose x^	7	–	0	9	–	3
No. 15 Olivet Nazarene ^	6	–	1	8	–	3
No. 19 McKendree	5	–	2	7	–	3
Saint Xavier	4	–	3	6	–	4
St. Francis (IL)	3	–	4	5	–	6
Taylor	2	–	5	3	–	7
Trinity International	1	–	6	4	–	7
Iowa Wesleyan	0	–	7	0	–	10
x – League champion/co-champions ^ – NAIA playoff participant; Rankings from NAIA Coaches' Poll

2001 Mid-States Football Association standings
	Conf.			Overall
Team	W		L	W		L
Mideast League
No. 14 Saint Francis (IN) x^	5	–	1	9	–	2
No. 11 Tri-State x^	5	–	1	8	–	3
No. 20 Walsh x	5	–	1	8	–	3
Tiffin	3	–	3	3	–	8
Geneva	2	–	4	4	–	6
Malone	1	–	5	2	–	8
Urbana	0	–	6	1	–	9
Midwest League
No. 12 St. Ambrose x^	7	–	0	8	–	3
No. 15 McKendree ^	6	–	1	8	–	3
Trinity International	4	–	3	8	–	3
No. 25 Saint Xavier	4	–	3	7	–	4
St. Francis (IL)	3	–	4	4	–	6
Taylor	2	–	5	2	–	8
Olivet Nazarene	1	–	6	2	–	8
Iowa Wesleyan	1	–	6	1	–	9
x – League champion/co-champions ^ – NAIA playoff participant; Rankings from NAIA Coaches' Poll

2002 Mid-States Football Association standings
	Conf.			Overall
Team	W		L	W		L
Mideast League
No. 8 Saint Francis (IN) x^	6	–	0	11	–	1
No. 21 Tri-State	5	–	1	6	–	3
No. 22 Walsh	4	–	2	8	–	3
Geneva	3	–	3	7	–	5
Malone	2	–	4	4	–	6
Taylor	1	–	5	3	–	7
Urbana	1	–	5	1	–	10
Midwest League
No. 4 McKendree x^	6	–	1	11	–	2
No. 11 Saint Xavier x^	6	–	1	9	–	3
No. 14 St. Ambrose x^	6	–	1	8	–	3
Olivet Nazarene	4	–	3	4	–	6
Trinity International	3	–	4	6	–	5
William Penn	2	–	5	4	–	7
St. Francis (IL)	1	–	6	2	–	8
Iowa Wesleyan	0	–	7	1	–	9
x – League champion/co-champions ^ – NAIA playoff participant; Rankings from NAIA Coaches' Poll

2003 Mid-States Football Association standings
	Conf.			Overall
Team	W		L	W		L
Mideast League
No. 4 Saint Francis (IN) x^	6	–	0	12	–	1
No. 22 Walsh	5	–	1	8	–	3
Geneva	4	–	2	7	–	4
Quincy	3	–	3	5	–	6
Urbana	2	–	4	3	–	8
Taylor	1	–	5	2	–	8
Malone	0	–	6	2	–	8
Midwest League
No. 15 McKendree ^	5	–	2	8	–	3
No. 19 Trinity International x	5	–	2	8	–	3
No. 9 St. Ambrose x^	5	–	2	8	–	4
No. 21 Saint Xavier x	5	–	2	7	–	4
Olivet Nazarene x	5	–	2	6	–	4
William Penn	2	–	5	2	–	8
Iowa Wesleyan	1	–	6	1	–	9
St. Francis (IL)	0	–	7	1	–	9
x – League champion/co-champions ^ – NAIA playoff participant; Rankings from NAIA Coaches' Poll

2004 Mid-States Football Association standings
	Conf.			Overall
Team	W		L	W		L
Mideast League
No. 2 St. Francis (IN) x^	7	–	0	13	–	1
No. 21 Walsh	6	–	1	8	–	3
Urbana	5	–	2	5	–	6
Geneva	4	–	3	5	–	5
Malone	2	–	5	4	–	6
Quincy	2	–	5	4	–	7
Taylor	2	–	5	2	–	8
Ohio Dominican	0	–	7	0	–	10
Midwest League
No. 12 McKendree x^	7	–	0	9	–	2
No. 14 Trinity International ^	5	–	2	8	–	3
No. 22 Saint Xavier	5	–	2	7	–	4
No. 19 St. Ambrose	4	–	3	7	–	3
Olivet Nazarene	4	–	3	7	–	5
William Penn	2	–	5	3	–	8
Iowa Wesleyan	1	–	6	2	–	9
St. Francis (IL)	0	–	7	1	–	10
x – League champion/co-champions ^ – NAIA playoff participant; Rankings from NAIA Coaches' Poll

2005 Mid-States Football Association standings
	Conf.			Overall
Team	W		L	W		L
Mideast League
No. 2 St. Francis (IN) x^	7	–	0	13	–	1
No. 18 Walsh	5	–	2	8	–	3
No. 14 Geneva ^	5	–	2	8	–	4
Quincy	4	–	3	5	–	6
Urbana	3	–	4	6	–	5
Malone	2	–	5	3	–	7
Ohio Dominican	2	–	5	3	–	7
Taylor	0	–	7	0	–	10
Midwest League
No. 9 Saint Xavier x^	6	–	1	9	–	3
No. 10 McKendree x^	6	–	1	8	–	3
No. 16 St. Ambrose ^	5	–	2	8	–	3
William Penn	4	–	3	6	–	5
Olivet Nazarene	3	–	4	6	–	6
Trinity International	2	–	5	3	–	7
Iowa Wesleyan	2	–	5	3	–	8
St. Francis (IL)	0	–	7	2	–	9
x – League champion/co-champions ^ – NAIA playoff participant; Rankings from NAIA Coaches' Poll

2006 Mid-States Football Association standings
	Conf.			Overall
Team	W		L	W		L
Mideast League
No. 2 St. Francis (IN) x^	6	–	0	13	–	1
No. 16 Walsh ^	4	–	2	9	–	3
No. 17 Ohio Dominican	4	–	2	7	–	3
No. 19 Malone	4	–	2	7	–	4
Geneva	2	–	4	4	–	5
Urbana	1	–	5	5	–	6
Taylor	0	–	6	1	–	9
Midwest League
No. 9 St. Ambrose x^	8	–	0	10	–	1
No. 4 Saint Xavier ^	7	–	1	10	–	3
McKendree	5	–	3	5	–	4
William Penn	5	–	3	5	–	6
Quincy	4	–	4	6	–	5
Olivet Nazarene	3	–	5	4	–	7
Trinity International	3	–	5	4	–	7
St. Francis (IL)	1	–	7	1	–	9
Iowa Wesleyan	0	–	8	1	–	9
x – League champion/co-champions ^ – NAIA playoff participant; Rankings from NAIA Coaches' Poll

2007 Mid-States Football Association standings
	Conf.			Overall
Team	W		L	W		L
Mideast League
No. 6 Ohio Dominican x^	7	–	0	12	–	1
No. 4 Saint Francis (IN) ^	6	–	1	11	–	2
No. 8 Saint Xavier ^	5	–	2	10	–	3
No. 25 Malone	4	–	3	8	–	4
Urbana	3	–	4	6	–	5
Walsh	2	–	5	5	–	6
Marian (IN)	1	–	6	1	–	9
Taylor	0	–	7	2	–	9
Midwest League
No. 10 St. Ambrose x^	7	–	0	8	–	3
McKendree	5	–	2	6	–	4
Olivet Nazarene	5	–	2	5	–	5
Quincy	4	–	3	6	–	5
William Penn	3	–	4	5	–	6
St. Francis (IL)	3	–	4	3	–	8
Trinity International	1	–	6	2	–	9
Iowa Wesleyan	0	–	7	0	–	11
x – League champion/co-champions ^ – NAIA playoff participant; Rankings from NAIA Coaches' Poll

2008 Mid-States Football Association standings
	Conf.			Overall
Team	W		L	W		L
Mideast League
No. 4 St. Francis (IN) x^	6	–	0	12	–	1
No. 16 Ohio Dominican	4	–	2	7	–	3
No. 22 Saint Xavier	4	–	2	7	–	4
No. 24 Malone	4	–	2	6	–	4
Marian (IN)	2	–	4	7	–	4
Walsh	1	–	5	3	–	8
Taylor	0	–	6	2	–	8
Midwest League
No. 14 St. Ambrose x^	6	–	1	8	–	4
William Penn	5	–	2	7	–	4
McKendree	5	–	2	6	–	4
Quincy	5	–	2	6	–	5
St. Francis (IL)	3	–	4	7	–	4
Olivet Nazarene	3	–	4	4	–	7
Iowa Wesleyan	1	–	6	3	–	8
Trinity International	0	–	7	1	–	10
x – League champion/co-champions ^ – NAIA playoff participant; Rankings from NAIA Coaches' Poll

2009 Mid-States Football Association standings
	Conf.			Overall
Team	W		L	W		L
Mideast League
No. 4 Saint Xavier x^	7	–	0	13	–	1
No. 16 Walsh	5	–	2	8	–	3
No. 17 Saint Francis (IN)	5	–	2	7	–	3
No. 20 Taylor	5	–	2	7	–	3
Marian (IN)	3	–	4	6	–	5
Malone	2	–	5	4	–	6
Olivet Nazarene	1	–	6	2	–	9
Trinity International	0	–	7	0	–	11
Midwest League
No. 9 McKendree x^	7	–	0	9	–	2
No. 21 Grand View	6	–	1	8	–	3
William Penn	5	–	2	7	–	5
St. Ambrose	4	–	3	6	–	4
Quincy	3	–	4	4	–	7
St. Francis (IL)	2	–	5	3	–	8
Iowa Wesleyan	1	–	6	2	–	9
Waldorf	0	–	7	1	–	9
x – League champion/co-champions ^ – NAIA playoff participant; Rankings from NAIA Coaches' Poll

2010 Mid-States Football Association standings
	Conf.			Overall
Team	W		L	W		L
Mideast League
No. 3 Saint Xavier x^	7	–	0	13	–	1
No. 5 Saint Francis (IN) ^	6	–	1	10	–	2
No. 7 Marian (IN) ^	5	–	2	10	–	3
Taylor	4	–	3	6	–	5
Walsh	3	–	4	7	–	4
Malone	2	–	5	3	–	7
Trinity International	1	–	6	3	–	8
Olivet Nazarene	0	–	7	0	–	11
Midwest League
No. 12 William Penn x	6	–	1	10	–	1
No. 8 McKendree x^	6	–	1	9	–	3
St. Francis (IL)	5	–	2	7	–	4
Grand View	4	–	3	6	–	4
St. Ambrose	3	–	4	5	–	5
Iowa Wesleyan	3	–	4	3	–	8
Waldorf	1	–	6	3	–	8
Quincy	0	–	7	0	–	11
x – League champion/co-champions ^ – NAIA playoff participant; Rankings from NAIA Coaches' Poll

2011 Mid-States Football Association standings
	Conf.			Overall
Team	W		L	W		L
Mideast League
No. 3 Marian (IN) x^	5	–	0	12	–	1
No. 1 Saint Xavier ^	4	–	1	14	–	1
No. 7 Saint Francis (IN) ^	3	–	2	9	–	3
Taylor	2	–	3	5	–	5
Quincy	1	–	4	4	–	6
Concordia (MI)	0	–	5	0	–	11
Midwest League
No. 8 St. Francis (IL) x^	6	–	1	10	–	3
No. 18 Grand View x^	6	–	1	8	–	4
No. 15 William Penn	5	–	2	9	–	2
No. 22 St. Ambrose	5	–	2	7	–	3
Olivet Nazarene	3	–	4	5	–	6
Iowa Wesleyan	2	–	5	3	–	7
Trinity International	1	–	6	2	–	8
Waldorf	0	–	7	2	–	9
x – League champion/co-champions ^ – NAIA playoff participant; Rankings from NAIA Coaches' Poll

2012 Mid-States Football Association standings
	Conf.			Overall
Team	W		L	W		L
Mideast League
No. 1 Marian (IN) x^	4	–	1	12	–	1
No. 4 Saint Xavier x^	4	–	1	11	–	2
No. 6 St. Francis (IN) x^	4	–	1	9	–	3
Siena Heights	2	–	3	4	–	6
Taylor	1	–	4	4	–	6
Concordia (MI)	0	–	5	0	–	9
Midwest League
No. 10 St. Ambrose x^	5	–	1	9	–	2
No. 15 William Penn x^	5	–	1	9	–	3
No. 17 Grand View x	5	–	1	8	–	3
St. Francis (IL)	3	–	3	6	–	5
Trinity International	1	–	5	4	–	7
Waldorf	1	–	5	4	–	7
Olivet Nazarene	1	–	5	3	–	8
x – League champion/co-champions ^ – NAIA playoff participant; Rankings from NAIA Coaches' Poll

2013 Mid-States Football Association standings
	Conf.			Overall
Team	W		L	W		L
Mideast League
No. 6 St. Francis (IN) x^	5	–	1	9	–	3
No. 21 St. Francis (IL)	4	–	2	7	–	4
Marian (IN)	4	–	2	6	–	5
Robert Morris (IL)	3	–	3	7	–	4
Taylor	3	–	3	5	–	5
Siena Heights	2	–	4	5	–	5
Concordia (MI)	0	–	6	1	–	9
Midwest League
No. 1 Grand View x^	6	–	0	14	–	0
No. 16 St. Ambrose ^	5	–	1	7	–	4
No. 18 Saint Xavier	4	–	2	7	–	4
William Penn	3	–	3	5	–	6
Trinity International	2	–	4	5	–	5
Olivet Nazarene	1	–	5	3	–	8
Waldorf	0	–	6	1	–	10
x – League champion/co-champions ^ – NAIA playoff participant; Rankings from NAIA Coaches' Poll

2014 Mid-States Football Association standings
	Conf.			Overall
Team	W		L	W		L
Mideast League
No. 2 Marian (IN) x^	5	–	1	11	–	3
Siena Heights x	5	–	1	6	–	4
Saint Francis (IN)	4	–	2	6	–	5
No. 20 Robert Morris (IL)	3	–	3	8	–	3
Taylor	3	–	3	5	–	6
St. Francis (IL)	1	–	5	4	–	7
Concordia (MI)	0	–	6	3	–	8
Midwest League
No. 6 Grand View x^	5	–	0	10	–	2
No. 4 Saint Xavier ^	4	–	1	10	–	3
No. 19 William Penn	3	–	2	7	–	4
St. Ambrose	2	–	3	5	–	5
Olivet Nazarene	1	–	4	2	–	9
Trinity International	0	–	5	3	–	7
x – League champion/co-champions ^ – NAIA playoff participant; Rankings from NAIA Coaches' Poll

2015 Mid-States Football Association standings
	Conf.			Overall
Team	W		L	W		L
Mideast League
No. 4 Saint Francis (IN) x^	6	–	0	11	–	1
No. 1 Marian (IN) ^	5	–	1	12	–	2
Taylor	4	–	2	7	–	3
Concordia (MI)	2	–	4	5	–	6
Siena Heights	2	–	4	4	–	6
Lindenwood–Belleville	2	–	4	4	–	6
Missouri Baptist	0	–	6	0	–	10
Midwest League
No. 18 St. Francis (IL) x	4	–	1	8	–	3
No. 12 Saint Xavier x^	4	–	1	7	–	4
No. 20 St. Ambrose	3	–	2	8	–	2
Robert Morris (IL)	3	–	2	6	–	4
Olivet Nazarene	1	–	4	3	–	8
Trinity International	0	–	5	2	–	9
x – League champion/co-champions ^ – NAIA playoff participant; Rankings from NAIA Coaches' Poll

2016 Mid-States Football Association standings
	Conf.			Overall
Team	W		L	W		L
Mideast League
No. 5 Marian (IN) x^	6	–	0	11	–	1
No. 1 Saint Francis (IN) ^	5	–	1	13	–	1
Concordia (MI)	4	–	2	7	–	4
Siena Heights	2	–	4	5	–	5
Taylor	2	–	4	4	–	7
Missouri Baptist	2	–	4	3	–	8
Lindenwood–Belleville	0	–	6	0	–	10
Midwest League
No. 15 Robert Morris (IL) x^	5	–	0	7	–	4
Saint Xavier	3	–	2	6	–	4
St. Francis (IL)	2	–	3	5	–	6
Saint Ambrose	2	–	3	4	–	6
Olivet Nazarene	2	–	3	4	–	7
Trinity International	1	–	4	4	–	7
x – League champion/co-champions ^ – NAIA playoff participant; Rankings from NAIA Coaches' Poll

2017 Mid-States Football Association standings
	Conf.			Overall
Team	W		L	W		L
Mideast League
No. 1 Saint Francis (IN) x^	6	–	0	14	–	0
No. 15 Concordia (MI) ^	5	–	1	9	–	2
No. 18 Marian (IN)	4	–	2	7	–	3
Siena Heights	3	–	3	5	–	5
Taylor	2	–	4	4	–	6
Missouri Baptist	1	–	5	3	–	8
Lindenwood–Belleville	0	–	6	0	–	10
Midwest League
No. 6 Saint Xavier x^	5	–	0	10	–	2
St. Francis (IL)	4	–	1	5	–	5
Olivet Nazarene	2	–	3	6	–	5
St. Ambrose	2	–	3	4	–	6
Trinity International	1	–	4	2	–	7
Robert Morris (IL)	1	–	4	2	–	9
x – League champion/co-champions ^ – NAIA playoff participant; Rankings from NAIA Coaches' Poll

2018 Mid-States Football Association standings
	Conf.			Overall
Team	W		L	W		L
Mideast League
No. 9 Marian (IN) x^	6	–	0	10	–	1
No. 6 Concordia (MI) ^	5	–	1	10	–	3
No. 3 Saint Francis (IN) ^	4	–	2	10	–	3
No. 25 Siena Heights	3	–	3	7	–	3
Missouri Baptist	2	–	4	4	–	7
Taylor	1	–	5	3	–	7
Lindenwood–Belleville	0	–	6	0	–	11
Midwest League
No. 7 Saint Xavier x^	5	–	0	9	–	4
Olivet Nazarene	4	–	1	5	–	5
St. Ambrose	3	–	2	6	–	4
St. Francis (IL)	2	–	3	4	–	7
Robert Morris (IL)	1	–	4	2	–	9
Trinity International	0	–	5	1	–	9
x – League champion/co-champions ^ – NAIA playoff participant; Rankings from NAIA Coaches' Poll

2019 Mid-States Football Association standings
	Conf.			Overall
Team	W		L	W		L
Mideast League
No. 2 Marian (IN) x^	6	–	0	12	–	1
No. 12 Concordia (MI) ^	4	–	2	8	–	3
No. 11 Saint Francis (IN) ^	4	–	2	7	–	3
No. 20 Siena Heights	3	–	3	7	–	3
Indiana Wesleyan	3	–	3	6	–	4
Taylor	1	–	5	3	–	7
Lawrence Tech	0	–	6	1	–	9
Midwest League
No. 8 Saint Xavier x^	6	–	0	9	–	3
Olivet Nazarene	4	–	2	6	–	5
Robert Morris (IL)	4	–	2	5	–	5
St. Ambrose	4	–	2	4	–	5
St. Francis (IL)	2	–	4	3	–	8
Missouri Baptist	1	–	5	2	–	9
Trinity International	0	–	6	1	–	10
x – League champion/co-champions ^ – NAIA playoff participant; Rankings from NAIA Coaches' Poll
