= 2012 NAIA football season =

American college football season

- National Championship: Barron Stadium; Rome, GA; December 13, 2012
- Champion: Marian (IN)
- Player of the Year: Jimmy Coy (quarterback, Saint Xavier)

The 2012 NAIA football season was the component of the 2012 college football season organized by the National Association of Intercollegiate Athletics (NAIA) in the United States. The season's playoffs, known as the NAIA Football National Championship, culminated with the championship game on December 13, at Barron Stadium in Rome, Georgia. The Marian Knights defeated the Morningside Mustang, in overtime by a score of 30–27, in the title game to win the program's first NAIA championship.

== Conference standings ==
2012 Frontier Conference football standings
	Conf.			Overall
Team	W		L	W		L
No. 5 Southern Oregon +^	8	–	2	9	–	3
No. 12 Montana Tech +^	8	–	2	8	–	3
No. 21 Carroll (MT)	7	–	3	7	–	4
Rocky Mountain	5	–	5	6	–	5
Eastern Oregon	4	–	6	4	–	6
Montana Western	4	–	6	4	–	6
Montana State–Northern	3	–	7	3	–	7
Dickinson State	1	–	9	2	–	9
+ – Conference co-champions; ^ – NAIA playoff participant; Rankings from NAIA Coaches' Poll

2012 Great Plains Athletic Conference football standings
	Conf.			Overall
Team	W		L	W		L
No. 2 Morningside $^	9	–	0	13	–	1
No. 12 Northwestern (IA) ^	7	–	2	9	–	3
No. 20 Doane	6	–	3	7	–	3
Dakota Wesleyan	5	–	4	6	–	4
Hastings	5	–	4	6	–	4
Nebraska Wesleyan	5	–	4	6	–	4
Concordia (NE)	4	–	5	5	–	6
Midland	3	–	6	4	–	6
Briar Cliff	1	–	8	1	–	10
Dordt	0	–	9	2	–	9
$ – Conference champion; ^ – NAIA playoff participant; Rankings from NAIA Coaches' Poll

2012 Heart of America Athletic Conference football standings
	Conf.			Overall
Team	W		L	W		L
No. 3 Missouri Valley $^	9	–	0	12	–	1
No. 12 MidAmerica Nazarene ^	8	–	1	8	–	3
No. 14 Baker ^	7	–	2	8	–	3
No. 23 Evangel	6	–	3	7	–	4
No. 22 Benedictine (KS)	5	–	4	7	–	4
Graceland	4	–	5	6	–	5
Peru State	3	–	6	5	–	6
Culver–Stockton	2*	–	7*	3*	–	8*
Avila	1*	–	8*	1*	–	10*
Central Methodist	0*	–	9*	0*	–	10*
$ – Conference champion; ^ – NAIA playoff participant *Central Methodist and Avila later forfeited their wins, giving Culver–Stockton two wins and Avila a win over Central Methodist.; Rankings from NAIA Coaches' Poll

2012 Kansas Collegiate Athletic Conference football standings
	Conf.			Overall
Team	W		L	W		L
No. 16 Ottawa $^	8	–	1	8	–	3
No. 18 Tabor	7	–	1	8	–	2
Kansas Wesleyan	6	–	3	6	–	5
Saint Mary (KS)	6	–	3	6	–	5
Friends	5	–	4	6	–	5
McPherson	4	–	4	4	–	5
Southwestern (KS)	3	–	6	4	–	7
Sterling	3	–	6	3	–	7
Bethany (KS)	2	–	7	4	–	7
Bethel (KS)	0	–	9	0	–	10
$ – Conference champion; ^ – NAIA playoff participant; Rankings from NAIA Coaches' Poll

2012 Mid-South Conference football standings
	Conf.			Overall
Team	W		L	W		L
East Division
No. 8 Georgetown (KY) x^	5	–	0	10	–	1
No. 7 Cumberlands (KY) ^	4	–	1	10	–	2
No. 25 Kentucky Christian	3	–	2	7	–	4
Union (KY)	1	–	4	4	–	7
Pikeville	1	–	4	3	–	8
Virginia–Wise	1	–	4	3	–	8
West Division
No. 9 Bethel (TN) x^	6	–	0	9	–	4
No. 19 Cumberland (TN)	4	–	2	8	–	3
Belhaven	4	–	2	6	–	5
Faulkner	4	–	2	6	–	5
Campbellsville	2	–	4	3	–	8
Lindsey Wilson	1	–	5	3	–	8
Bluefield	0	–	6	0	–	11
x – Division champion/co-champions; ^ – NAIA playoff participant; Rankings from NAIA Coaches' Poll

2012 Mid-States Football Association standings
	Conf.			Overall
Team	W		L	W		L
Mideast League
No. 1 Marian (IN) x^	4	–	1	12	–	1
No. 4 Saint Xavier x^	4	–	1	11	–	2
No. 6 St. Francis (IN) x^	4	–	1	9	–	3
Siena Heights	2	–	3	4	–	6
Taylor	1	–	4	4	–	6
Concordia (MI)	0	–	5	0	–	9
Midwest League
No. 10 St. Ambrose x^	5	–	1	9	–	2
No. 15 William Penn x^	5	–	1	9	–	3
No. 17 Grand View x	5	–	1	8	–	3
St. Francis (IL)	3	–	3	6	–	5
Trinity International	1	–	5	4	–	7
Waldorf	1	–	5	4	–	7
Olivet Nazarene	1	–	5	3	–	8
x – League champion/co-champions ^ – NAIA playoff participant; Rankings from NAIA Coaches' Poll

2012 NAIA independents football records
	Conf.			Overall
Team	W		L	W		L
Robert Morris (IL)		–		8	–	3
No. 24 Valley City State		–		7	–	3
Bacone		–		7	–	4
Langston		–		6	–	4
Edward Waters		–		5	–	6
Jamestown		–		4	–	6
Lindenwood–Belleville		–		4	–	6
Mayville State		–		4	–	6
Menlo		–		4	–	6
SAGU		–		4	–	6
Southern Virginia		–		4	–	6
Webber International		–		4	–	6
Point		–		2	–	8
Wayland Baptist		–		2	–	8
Dakota State		–		2	–	9
Texas College		–		2	–	9
Ave Maria		–		1	–	7
Haskell		–		1	–	8
Rankings from NAIA Coaches' Poll
