= 2012 Marian Knights football team =

American college football season

2012 Marian Knights football

NAIA national champion MFSA Mideast League co-champion

NAIA National Championship Game, W 20–27 (OT) vs. Morningside
- Conference: Mid-States Football Association
- Mideast League
- Record: 12–1 (4–1 MSFA)
- Head coach: Ted Karras Jr. (6th season)

2012 Mid-States Football Association standings
	Conf.			Overall
Team	W		L	W		L
Mideast League
No. 1 Marian (IN) x^	4	–	1	12	–	1
No. 4 Saint Xavier x^	4	–	1	11	–	2
No. 6 St. Francis (IN) x^	4	–	1	9	–	3
Siena Heights	2	–	3	4	–	6
Taylor	1	–	4	4	–	6
Concordia (MI)	0	–	5	0	–	9
Midwest League
No. 10 St. Ambrose x^	5	–	1	9	–	2
No. 15 William Penn x^	5	–	1	9	–	3
No. 17 Grand View x	5	–	1	8	–	3
St. Francis (IL)	3	–	3	6	–	5
Trinity International	1	–	5	4	–	7
Waldorf	1	–	5	4	–	7
Olivet Nazarene	1	–	5	3	–	8
x – League champion/co-champions ^ – NAIA playoff participant; Rankings from NAIA Coaches' Poll

The 2012 Marian Knights football team was an American football team that represented Marian University as a member of the Mid-States Football Association during the 2012 NAIA football season. In their sixth season under head coach Ted Karras Jr., the Knights compiled a 12–1 record (4–1 against conference opponents) and won the NAIA national championship, defeating Morningside, 30–27, in overtime in the NAIA National Championship Game.

== Schedule ==
Date	Opponent	Site	Result	Attendance	Source
August 25	at Olivet Nazarene*	Ward Field; Bourbonnais, IL	W 35–0	2,213	
September 1	vs. Bethel (TN)*	Dyersburg High School; Dyersburg, TN (Big River Bowl)	W 31–7		
September 8	at Siena Heights	Adrian, MI	W 31–3		
September 22	No. 17 Grand View*^{†}	St. V Health Field; Indianapolis, IN	W 31–20	2,000	
October 6	at Taylor	Trojan Stadium; Upland, IN	W 49–21		
October 13	Saint Francis (IN)	St. V Health Field; Indianapolis, IN	W 45–38	4,475	
October 20	Concordia (MI)	St. V Health Field; Indianapolis, IN	W 59–7	2,944	
October 27	Menlo*	St. V Health Field; Indianapolis, IN	W 34–7	3,115	
November 3	at Saint Xavier	Deaton Field; Chicago, IL	L 6–23	3,000	
November 17	Northwestern (IA)*	St. V Health Field; Indianapolis, IN (NAIA first round)	W 42–32	3,215	
November 24	Saint Francis (IN)*	St. V Health Field; Indianapolis, IN (NAIA quarterfinal)	W 45–34	2,980	
December 1	at Missouri Valley*	Gregg-Mitchell Field; Marshall, MO (NAIA semifinal)	W 20–17	4,000	
December 13	vs. Morningside*	Barron Stadium; Rome, GA (NAIA Championship Game)	W 30–27 ^{OT}	5,263	
*Non-conference game; ^{†}Homecoming
