= 2012 Saint Francis Cougars football team =

American college football season

2012 Saint Francis Cougars football

NAIA Playoff Quarterfinalist MSFA (MEL) co-champion
- Conference: Mid-States Football Association
- Mideast League
- Record: 9–3 (4–1 MSFA (MEL))
- Head coach: Kevin Donley (15th season)
- Offensive coordinator: Patrick Donley, Trevor Miller (9th, 7th season)
- Defensive coordinator: Joey Didier, Eric Wagoner (3rd, 5th season)
- Home stadium: Bishop John M. D'Arcy Stadium

2012 Mid-States Football Association standings
	Conf.			Overall
Team	W		L	W		L
Mideast League
No. 1 Marian (IN) x^	4	–	1	12	–	1
No. 4 Saint Xavier x^	4	–	1	11	–	2
No. 6 St. Francis (IN) x^	4	–	1	9	–	3
Siena Heights	2	–	3	4	–	6
Taylor	1	–	4	4	–	6
Concordia (MI)	0	–	5	0	–	9
Midwest League
No. 10 St. Ambrose x^	5	–	1	9	–	2
No. 15 William Penn x^	5	–	1	9	–	3
No. 17 Grand View x	5	–	1	8	–	3
St. Francis (IL)	3	–	3	6	–	5
Trinity International	1	–	5	4	–	7
Waldorf	1	–	5	4	–	7
Olivet Nazarene	1	–	5	3	–	8
x – League champion/co-champions ^ – NAIA playoff participant; Rankings from NAIA Coaches' Poll

The 2012 Saint Francis Cougars football team represented the University of Saint Francis, located in Fort Wayne, Indiana, in the 2012 NAIA football season. They were led by head coach Kevin Donley, who served his 15th year as the first and only head coach in the history of Saint Francis football. The Cougars played their home games at Bishop John D'Arcy Stadium and were members of the Mid-States Football Association (MSFA) Mideast League (MEL). The Cougars finished tied for 1st in the MSFA MEL division and received an at-large bid to participate in the postseason NAIA playoffs.

== Schedule ==
(9–3 overall, 4–1 conference)

Date	Time	Opponent	Rank	Site	Result	Attendance
August 25	1:00pm	at Texas College*	No. 6	Trinity Mother Frances Rose Stadium; Tyler, TX	W 46–10	377
September 1	Noon	Wisconsin-Stevens Point*	No. 6	Bishop D'Arcy Stadium; Fort Wayne, IN	W 39–31	3,251
September 8	Noon	No. 20 St. Ambrose*	No. 6	Bishop D'Arcy Stadium; Fort Wayne, IN	L 14–15	3,150
September 22	7:00pm	Concordia (MI)^{†}	No. 12	Bishop D'Arcy Stadium; Fort Wayne, IN (NAIA All-time Wins)	W 76–14	3,600
September 29	7:00pm	at No. 1 Saint Xavier	No. 10	Deaton Field; Chicago, IL	W 25–13	3,000
October 13	1:00pm	at No. 1 Marian	No. 7	St. Vincent Health Field; Indianapolis, IN	L 38–45	4,475
October 20	2:00pm	at No. 5 William Penn*	No. 9	Statesmen Community Stadium; Oskaloosa, IA	W 28–19	800
October 27	Noon	Siena Heights	No. 7	Bishop D'Arcy Stadium; Fort Wayne, IN	W 31–7	2,670
November 3	Noon	Taylor	No. 6	Bishop D'Arcy Stadium; Fort Wayne, IN	W 21–0	2,279
November 10	2:00pm	at Lindenwood (IL)*	No. 6	Lindenwood Stadium; Belleville, IL	W 44–7	1,381
November 17	Noon	No. 11 Baker (KS)*	No. 6	Bishop D'Arcy Stadium; Fort Wayne, IN (NAIA First Round)	W 22–17	1,371
November 24	1:00pm	at No. 5 Marian*	No. 6	St. Vincent Health Field; Indianapolis, IN (NAIA Quarterfinal)	L 34–45	2,980
*Non-conference game; ^{†}Homecoming; Rankings from Coaches' Poll released prior to the game; All times are in Eastern time

== Game summaries ==
The 2012 season opened with the Cougars ranked #6 in the coaches preseason poll.

8/25/2012 - The Cougars traveled to Texas to play the season opener against a new opponent. The game was the farthest west the Cougars had ever ventured to play a football game. The Cougars returned to Fort Wayne with a 46–10 victory.

9/1/2012 - The Cougars opened the home season with a 39–31 victory over the Pointers from Wisconsin - Stevens Point. The game started with USF taking the opening kickoff and driving for a touchdown and a quick 7–0 lead. The Pointers responded with a field goal, and Saint Francis added another first quarter score to reach the first break with a 13–3 lead. What began to look like a rout quickly changed as Stevens Point scored 3 straight second half touchdowns to take their biggest lead, 24–13. A late Cougar touchdown moved the halftime score to 24–19 in favor of the Pointers. The Cougars made some adjustments in the locker room, and they dominated the second half of play. They scored 4 unanswered touchdowns to regain and extend the lead to 39–24 before a late Pointers TD put the final points on the scoreboard. The second half comeback was led by backup quarterback David Yoder after starter Josh Miller sat out due to dizziness reported after the first half of play.

9/8/2012 - The home season continued with a non-conference game against MSFA rival Saint Ambrose. It was an uncharacteristic defensive contest as all 8 quarters resulted in less than 10 points being scored by the respective teams. As was the case in week 1, the Cougars won the coin toss and took possession of the football. Their first drive culminated in a touchdown. After an unsuccessful kick attempt, they led 6–0. Saint Ambrose then took the ensuing kick-off and marched downfield with similar precision. When the drive stalled, they kicked a field goal on 4th down. But the kick was never counted because a USF player ran into the kicker for a penalty that kept the SAU drive alive. They got the ultimate finish, a touchdown. After a successful kick, the Cougars trailed 7–6 at the end of the first quarter. There was no scoring in either the second or third quarters. In the 4th quarter, the Cougars made a quarterback change, bringing Wes Hunsucker into the game. He got immediate results. His second play from scrimmage was a 10-yard pass to Austin Coleman, who raced down the right sidelines evading a handful of SAU players on his way to a 70-yard TD. The following 2-point conversion was equally exciting as RB Antoin Campbell did a high jump-like leap over two defenders to reach the endzone. The 2 points extended the USF lead to 14–7. But SAU responded with a late touchdown of their own, and a successful 2-point conversion sealed their first victory in the history of games between the two.

9/22/2012 - After a week off, after a loss two weeks ago, the Cougars returned to the field for a game filled with notable happenings. The 7:00pm marked the start of the first home night game in USF history. The Homecoming game's outcome was never in doubt once the Cougars started putting points on the board. Soon after the offense scored to give USF a 7–0 lead, the defense contributed immediately. On the next series of plays by Concordia, a pass was intercepted and run back to extend the score to 24–0. The Cougars never looked back as they continued putting points on the board. The final score of 76–14 represented the third-highest score in USF history, and the most points scored since 2002. The victory was win #257 for Coach Kevin Donley. Coupled with a loss by Dickinson State (and coach Hank Biesiot), the win broke a 3-way tie and placed Coach Donley solely atop the leader ladder of most wins all-time by a NAIA coach. The win record was formerly held by Frosty Westering.

9/29/2012 - This week's opponent was defending NAIA national champion Saint Xavier. The StX team was undefeated and ranked #1 in the current year's polls, and USF had not beaten them in the past four contests between the two. In addition, it was Homecoming weekend for Saint Xavier. But USF was prepared for the occasion and returned to Fort Wayne with an upset victory, defeating the Saint Xavier team 25–13. It was the first time that USF had defeated a #1-ranked team, in a game that will forever remain one of the program's great accomplishments. The Cougars are idle next week before hitting the road again to visit a pair of Top 10-ranked teams the following two Saturdays. As a result of the upset, Saint Xavier dropped to 6th in the NAIA Coaches' Weekly Poll, and USF climbed to 7th.

10/13/2012 - The Cougars had the improbable task of facing the #1 ranked team in the nation for the second consecutive game with their visit to Marian. Once again, the Cougars fought hard; but the outcome was a 45–38 loss in the high-scoring game. Time ran out as the Cougars were driving for a game-tying score. With the loss, the Cougars dropped 2 places to #9. Next week, USF continues their tough road schedule with a visit to #5 William Penn.

10/20/2012 - For the third time in 3 games, the Cougars found themselves on the road against a team ranked in the NAIA top-5. This week's opponent was William Penn, an undefeated team that had not lost a home game in over two years. Saint Francis scored touchdowns in each of the first two quarters, and their opponents kicked two field goals - the second one as time expired in the half - to bring the score to 14–6 in favor of Saint Francis at the half. The gap was quickly closed as William Penn took the second-half's opening kickoff and returned it for a touchdown to shorten the deficit to 14–13. But just as suddenly, the Cougars took the next kickoff and ran it back for a touchdown of their own. The touchdown restored the 8-point margin to 21–13. With less than a minute off the second half clock, two touchdowns had been scored before either team's offense had touched the football. William Penn added two field goals, and USF added another touchdown to bring the score to the final margin of victory, a 28–19 upset win for Saint Francis. During the game, the Cougar's Austin Coleman set a USF record for most return yards in a single game. Including the kickoff return, Coleman returned the ball for 207 yards in the game. For the win, Saint Francis improved to #7 in the NAIA national rankings.

10/27/2012 - After being tested on the road for over a month against top-5 powerhouses, USF returned home to face a relatively new program from Siena Heights. The outcome was as expected. Saint Francis kicked a field goal on their first possession and added a touchdown on their second on their way to a 17–0 lead at the end of the first quarter. They added two more touchdowns against the Saints as the offense experimented by using two backup quarterbacks for most of the second half. Siena Heights avoided a shutout when they scored on their final possession of the game, with less than a minute left on the clock. The final score of this conference game was a victory for USF, 31–7. Next week, USF faces their final conference foe of the season when it hosts Taylor.

11/3/2012 - The offense sputtered, but the defense played well enough to create a victory and a share of the MSFA Midwest League title. In their final conference game of the season, USF prevailed 21–0 over Taylor University. The defensive effort included 4 interceptions: one was returned for a touchdown, and two were made at the goal line to halt Taylor scoring drives. In addition, the defense posted a goal line stance that prevented a Taylor score with a first and goal from inside the 5-yard line. The offense scored two touchdowns, each resulting from Taylor punt miscues that gave the Cougars the ball deep inside Taylor territory. The first score came shortly after a Taylor snap that sailed over the punter's head, and the second came when USF blocked a punt attempt. All scoring occurred in the first half; in a rare occurrence, USF was forced to punt the ball on all five possessions in the second half. Combined with a Marian home loss to Saint Xavier, the victory gave all 3 teams one conference loss on the season and a share of the conference championship. The conference automatic bid to the postseason playoffs will go to the team finishing with highest rating in the final regular season polls; the other two teams will presumably receive at-large berths into the tournament.

11/10/2012 - The Cougars completed their regular season with a 44–7 road win with a visit to another first year football program, Lindenwood (IL). With starting QB Josh Miller on the sidelines nursing an ankle injury, backup David Yoder led the offense for most of the game. Third-stringer Wes Hunsaker came in to take several snaps near the end of the game. The final regular season rankings and the postseason draw will be released tomorrow to show the Cougars' path through the postseason.

11/17/2012 - Before the game, a fan seated behind me was overheard to employ an unusual method of predicting the outcome. USF was ranked #6; Baker was ranked #11. Therefore, USF would win by 5. Scientific or not, the fan's prediction proved to be prophetic as USF prevailed in the contest by a final score of 22–17. The game's outcome was largely determined by a USF defense that would bend but not break. After winning the opening coin flip, Baker elected to receive. Saint Francis kicked the ball into the endzone, and Baker started at their own 25 after the touchback. A few plays later, the defense responded with the first interception of the game, and USF took over deep in Baker territory. The turnover led to the first score of the game, an 11-yard pass to give the Cougars a 6–0 lead. No other scores were logged in the first quarter. In the second quarter, USF tacked on a field goal after the defense forced and recovered a Baker fumble. It was the first of 3 on the day for the Cougar placekicker, tying the school's record for most field goals in one game. Baker took the ensuing kickoff and marched in for their first score of the game, narrowing the USF lead to 9–7. USF then took over on offense and produced their best sustained drive of the game. With 33 seconds left in the first half, the Cougars’ quarterback scored on a 13-yard scamper into the end zone to bring the score to 16–7. Not to be outdone, Baker took the following kickoff and marched close enough to kick a field goal with 10 seconds left to bring the halftime score to 16–10 in favor of Saint Francis The third quarter was a back-and-forth defensive struggle, and neither team scored. The fourth quarter saw Saint Francis convert their second field goal. But Baker took the kickoff and marched the length of the field, scoring another touchdown that narrowed the gap to 19–17 in favor of the home team. USF responded by kicking their third field goal, extending the margin to 5, with 3:44 left in the game. The outcome of the game was uncertain until USF intercepted a Baker pass with 2:33 left in the game. After that, Saint Francis ran out the clock with Baker having only two timeouts to halt the runoff. On the day, the USF defense captured 4 Baker turnovers, 2 interceptions and 2 fumble recoveries. Although the Baker offense outgained the Cougars, the Cougar defense came through with big plays to stop Baker's momentum most of the time. The win was the 17th consecutive home playoff win for USF, who has not lost a home game in their entire playoff history.

11/24/2012 - These two teams met earlier in a regular season game at the same field, and the outcome of this one was very similar to the earlier match. Saint Francis played an inspired game; but in the end, the Cougars were no match for the offensive efficiency that was displayed by the Marian Knights. Saint Francis received the opening kickoff and sustained a drive that resulted in a score and a 7–0 lead. They kicked the ball to Marian, who lost possession when a downfield bomb was intercepted by the USF defender. At that point the Cougars were in control, but the momentum eventually shifted and stayed with Marian for the remainder of the game. Marian scored with about 3 minutes left on the clock, and the first quarter ended tied, 7–7. An efficient passing game and the ability to maintain control of the ball were two of Marian's biggest assets. Marian's offense kept the ball for about 11 minutes in the second quarter, producing a field goal and a late touchdown to bring the halftime score to 17–7 in favor of the Knights. The third quarter opened with Marian returning to offense. But the Cougars’ defense held, and the Knights kicked the ball. The Cougars misplayed the punt, and Marian recovered the ball. That drive ended with a USF interception. But the Cougars’ offense failed to move the chains in 3 plays, and a USF punt sent the ball to Marian's 11-yard line. Marian went 3-and-out, and USF was set to receive the ball once again. A poor punt never made it to the midfield line, giving USF great field position. Unfortunately, a Cougars defensive player ran into the kicker, and that penalty allowed Marian to retain possession of the football. The error proved costly as Marian drove the ball for a touchdown that extended the lead to 24–7. USF took the kick and marched for a touchdown of their own to move the score to 24–14. The Knights immediately countered by returning the ensuing kickoff for a touchdown. After a missed extra point, the quarter ended with Marian leading 30–14. Early in the 4th quarter, USF drove for a touchdown to bring the lead back to 30–21. The Cougars played good defense, and Marian punted the ball back to the Cougars. But the next possession saw two dropped passes before the third attempt was intercepted by the Knights. Most of the rest of the quarter was burned up by Marian's offense, who held the ball for nearly 12 minutes of the period. Marian marched for a score, and a 2-point conversion extended their lead to 38–21. The next kick was immediately returned for a 100-yard touchdown return by the Cougars’ Austin Coleman. For Coleman, the touchdown return was the 8th in his career, setting a new NAIA record for most touchdowns on returns in a career. Marian again took over on offense, and they drove the ball for their final points of the game, making the score 45–28. A late Cougars’ touchdown with 12 seconds left on the clock brought about the final score of 45–34 after the Cougars failed to convert a 2-point pass attempt.

== Ranking movements ==
Ranking movements Legend: ██ Increase in ranking ██ Decrease in ranking
	Week											
Poll	Pre	1	2	3	4	5	6	7	8	9	10	Final
NAIA Coaches' Poll	6	11	12	10	7	7	9	7	6	6	6	6
