= 2012 Mid-South Conference football season =

- League: NAIA
- Sport: football
- Duration: Fall-Winter 2012
- Number of teams: 13

2012

Football seasons
- ← 2011 2013 →

2012 Mid-South Conference football standings
	Conf.			Overall
Team	W		L	W		L
East Division
No. 8 Georgetown (KY) x^	5	–	0	10	–	1
No. 7 Cumberlands (KY) ^	4	–	1	10	–	2
No. 25 Kentucky Christian	3	–	2	7	–	4
Union (KY)	1	–	4	4	–	7
Pikeville	1	–	4	3	–	8
Virginia–Wise	1	–	4	3	–	8
West Division
No. 9 Bethel (TN) x^	6	–	0	9	–	4
No. 19 Cumberland (TN)	4	–	2	8	–	3
Belhaven	4	–	2	6	–	5
Faulkner	4	–	2	6	–	5
Campbellsville	2	–	4	3	–	8
Lindsey Wilson	1	–	5	3	–	8
Bluefield	0	–	6	0	–	11
x – Division champion/co-champions; ^ – NAIA playoff participant; Rankings from NAIA Coaches' Poll

The 2012 Mid-South Conference football season is made up of 13 United States college athletic programs that compete in the Mid-South Conference (MSC) under the National Association of Intercollegiate Athletics (NAIA) for the 2012 college football season. The conference is divided into two divisions, the East Division and the West Division.

Georgetown College was declared champion of the East Division with a conference record of 5 wins and 0 losses in the conference. Bethel was declared the winner of the West Division with 6 wins and 0 losses in the conference. A total of three of the teams qualified for the 2012 NAIA Football National Championship: Georgetown, Cumberlands, and Bethel.

== Awards ==
Upon completion of the season, the conference awarded multiple individual awards. In the Western Division, Cumberland's Lemeco Miller was named offensive player of the year while Belhaven's Calvin Lewis earned defensive player of the year. University of the Cumberlands' Terrance Cobb and Weston Hazelhurst each were awarded the East Division's Offensive and Defensive Player of the Year awards. Both divisions awarded first and second all-conference teams as well as academic all-conference awards. Cumberland University led the academic honors with 31 student athletes.
