= 2012 NAIA independent football schools football season =

2012 NAIA Independents football season
- League: NAIA
- Sport: football
- Duration: Fall-Winter 2012
- Number of teams: 17

2012

Football seasons
- ← 2011 2013 →

2012 NAIA independents football records
	Conf.			Overall
Team	W		L	W		L
Robert Morris (IL)		–		8	–	3
No. 24 Valley City State		–		7	–	3
Bacone		–		7	–	4
Langston		–		6	–	4
Edward Waters		–		5	–	6
Jamestown		–		4	–	6
Lindenwood–Belleville		–		4	–	6
Mayville State		–		4	–	6
Menlo		–		4	–	6
SAGU		–		4	–	6
Southern Virginia		–		4	–	6
Webber International		–		4	–	6
Point		–		2	–	8
Wayland Baptist		–		2	–	8
Dakota State		–		2	–	9
Texas College		–		2	–	9
Ave Maria		–		1	–	7
Haskell		–		1	–	8
Rankings from NAIA Coaches' Poll

The 2012 NAIA Independents football season is made up of seventeen United States college athletic programs that compete without any conference affiliation as NAIA independent football schools under the National Association of Intercollegiate Athletics (NAIA) for the 2012 college football season. No conference champion is declared. The team with the best record was the Robert Morris Eagles, with eight wins and three losses, followed by Valley City State Vikings at seven wins and three losses.

None of the independent teams advanced to the 2012 NAIA Football National Championship.
