= 2012 Mid-States Football Association season =

- League: NAIA
- Sport: football
- Duration: Fall-Winter 2012
- Teams: 13

2012

Football seasons
- 2011 2013

2012 Mid-States Football Association standings
	Conf.			Overall
Team	W		L	W		L
Mideast League
No. 1 Marian (IN) x^	4	–	1	12	–	1
No. 4 Saint Xavier x^	4	–	1	11	–	2
No. 6 St. Francis (IN) x^	4	–	1	9	–	3
Siena Heights	2	–	3	4	–	6
Taylor	1	–	4	4	–	6
Concordia (MI)	0	–	5	0	–	9
Midwest League
No. 10 St. Ambrose x^	5	–	1	9	–	2
No. 15 William Penn x^	5	–	1	9	–	3
No. 17 Grand View x	5	–	1	8	–	3
St. Francis (IL)	3	–	3	6	–	5
Trinity International	1	–	5	4	–	7
Waldorf	1	–	5	4	–	7
Olivet Nazarene	1	–	5	3	–	8
x – League champion/co-champions ^ – NAIA playoff participant; Rankings from NAIA Coaches' Poll

The 2012 Mid-States Football Association season is made up of 13 United States college athletic programs that compete in the Mid-States Football Association (MSFA) under the National Association of Intercollegiate Athletics (NAIA) for the 2012 college football season. The conference is divided into two leagues, the Mideast League and the Midwest league.

Marian, Saint Xavier, and Saint Francis (IN) were declared tri-champions of the Mideast league and St. Abrose, William Penn, and Grand View were tri-champions of the Midwest League. A total of five of the teams qualified for the 2012 NAIA Football National Championship: Saint Xavier, Marian and Saint Francis from the Mideast League; St. Ambrose and William Penn from the Midwest League.

== Regular season ==
=== Early games ===
Date	Time	Visiting team	Home team	Site	TV	Result	Attendance	Ref.
August 25, 2012	1:00PM	Saint Francis (IN)	Texas College	Mewbourne Stadium • Tyler, Texas (0)		46–10	-	
August 25, 2012	2:00PM	Trinity Bible College	Trinity International	Leslie Frazier Stadium • Deerfield, Illinois (0)		15–59	-	
August 25, 2012	5:00PM	Concordia (MI)	No. 7 St. Francis (IL)	Joliet Memorial Stadium • Joliet, Illinois (0)		14–44	-	
August 25, 2012	7:00PM	Graceland University	Grand View	Williams Stadium • Des Moines, Iowa (0)		0–0	-	
August 25, 2012	7:00PM	William Penn	Iowa Wesleyan	Lloyd Wilson Field • Hastings, Nebraska (0)		39–14	-	
August 25, 2012	7:00PM	No. 3 Marian	Olivet Nazarene	Ward Field • Bourbonnais, Illinois (0)		35–35	-	
August 25, 2012	7:00PM	Robert Morris (IL)	Siena Heights	O'Laughlin Stadium • Adrian, Michigan (0)		19–26 ^{2 OT}	-	
August 30, 2012	7:00PM	Grand View	Drake University	Open Space Park Football Field • Sioux Center, Iowa (0)		0–0	-	
August 30, 2012	7:00PM	Ferris State University	St. Francis (Ill.)	Joliet Memorial Stadium • Joliet, Illinois (0)	0	35–24	-	
^{#}Rankings from NAIA Coaches' Poll. All times are in Central Time.

=== Week 1 ===
Date	Time	Visiting team	Home team	Site	TV	Result	Attendance	Ref.
September 1, 2012	12:00PM	Wisconsin-Stevens Point	Saint Francis (IN)	Bishop D'Arcy Stadium • Fort Wayne, Indiana (0)		31–39	-	
September 1, 2012	12:30PM	William Penn	Bethel (Kansas)	Thresher Stadium • North Newton, Kansas (0)		54–0	-	
September 1, 2012	2:00PM	Siena Heights	Iowa Wesleyan	Lloyd Wilson Field • Hastings, Nebraska (0)		34–36 ^{3 OT}	-	
September 1, 2012	2:00PM	Olivet Nazarene	Robert Morris (IL)	Morris Field • Arlington Heights, Illinois (0)		0–42	-	
September 1, 2012	2:00PM	Saint Ambrose	Trinity International	Leslie Frazier Stadium • Deerfield, Illinois (0)		43–6	-	
September 1, 2012	6:00PM	Marian	Bethel University	Wildcat Stadium • McKenzie, Tennessee (Big River Bowl)	0	31–7	-	
September 1, 2012	6:00PM	Dordt College	Waldorf	A. David Bolstorff Field • Forest City, Iowa (0)		0–0	-	
September 1, 2012	7:00PM	Taylor	Anderson University	Macholtz Stadium • Anderson, Indiana (0)		46–0	-	
September 1, 2012	7:00PM	No. 1 Saint Xavier University	Olivet Nazarene	Ward Field • Bourbonnais, Illinois (0)		41–12	-	
^{#}Rankings from NAIA Coaches' Poll. All times are in Central Time.

=== Week 2 ===
Date	Time	Visiting team	Home team	Site	TV	Result	Attendance	Ref.
September 8, 2012	1:00PM	Trinity International	Concordia (MI)	Riverbank Stadium • Ann Arbor, Michigan (Skyline High School)		42–0	-	
September 8, 2012	1:00PM	Robert Morris (IL)	Haskell Indian Nations University	Haskell Stadium • Lawrence, Kansas (0)		62–6	-	
September 8, 2012	1:00PM	Marian	Siena Heights	O'Laughlin Stadium • Adrian, Michigan (0)		31–3	-	
September 8, 2012	1:00PM	Presentation College	Waldorf	A. David Bolstorff Field • Forest City, Iowa (0)		29–47	-	
September 8, 2012	11:00AM	Saint Ambrose	Saint Francis (IN)	Bishop D'Arcy Stadium • Fort Wayne, Indiana (0)		15–14	-	
September 8, 2012	2:00PM	Iowa Wesleyan	Taylor	Joel Wiens Stadium • Hillsboro, Kansas (0)		14–41	-	
September 8, 2012	2:30PM	No. 15 Grand View	Olivet Nazarene	Ward Field • Bourbonnais, Illinois (0)		14–6	-	
September 8, 2012	4:00PM	Luther College	William Penn	Oskaloosa Community Stadium • Oskaloosa, Iowa (0)		0–0	-	
September 8, 2012	7:00PM	St. Francis (IL)	Saint Xavier	Bruce R. Deaton • Chicago, Illinois (0)		0–0	-	
^{#}Rankings from NAIA Coaches' Poll. All times are in Central Time.

=== Week 3 ===
Date	Time	Visiting team	Home team	Site	TV	Result	Attendance	Ref.
September 15, 2012	1:00PM	Siena Heights	Concordia (MI)	Riverbank Stadium • Ann Arbor, Michigan (Huron High School Riverbank Stadium)		31–14	-	
September 15, 2012	2:00PM	Trinity International	Grand View	Williams Stadium • Des Moines, Iowa (0)		15–27	-	
September 15, 2012	2:00PM	Taylor	St. Ambrose (Iowa)	Brady Street Stadium • Davenport, Iowa (0)		14–24	-	
September 15, 2012	3:00PM	Saint Joseph's College	Robert Morris (IL)	Morris Field • Arlington Heights, Illinois (0)	0	35–40	-	
September 15, 2012	7:00PM	No. 17 St. Francis (IL)	Olivet Nazarene	Ward Field • Bourbonnais, Illinois (0)		19–16 ^{2 OT}	-	
September 15, 2012	7:00PM	Langston University	Saint Xavier	Bruce R. Deaton • Chicago, Illinois (0)		0–0 ^{0}	-	
September 15, 2012	7:30PM	William Penn	Waldorf	A. David Bolstorff Field • Forest City, Iowa (0)		48–14 ^{0}	-	
^{#}Rankings from NAIA Coaches' Poll. All times are in Central Time.

=== Week 4 ===
Date	Time	Visiting team	Home team	Site	TV	Result	Attendance	Ref.
September 22, 2012	1:00PM	Robert Morris (IL)	Lindenwood University-Belleville	Harlen C. Hunter Stadium • Saint Charles, Missouri (0)		45–6 ^{0}	-	
September 22, 2012	1:00PM	Grand View	Marian	St.Vincent Health Field • Indianapolis, Indiana (0)	0	20–31 ^{0}	-	
September 22, 2012	1:00PM	Taylor	Trine University	Mewbourne Stadium • Tyler, Texas (0)		13–28 ^{0}	-	
September 22, 2012	1:00PM	Waldorf	Trinity Bible College	Mewbourne Stadium • Tyler, Texas (0)		76–35 ^{0}	-	
September 22, 2012	2:00PM	Saint Xavier	Trinity International	Leslie Frazier Stadium • Deerfield, Illinois (0)		36–26 ^{0}	-	
September 22, 2012	5:00PM	Iowa Wesleyan	St. Francis (IL)	Joliet Memorial Stadium • Joliet, Illinois (0)		13–52 ^{0}	-	
September 22, 2012	7:00PM	Concordia (MI)	Saint Francis (IN)	Bishop D'Arcy Stadium • Fort Wayne, Indiana (0)		14–76 ^{0}	-	
^{#}Rankings from NAIA Coaches' Poll. All times are in Central Time.

=== Week 5 ===
Date	Time	Visiting team	Home team	Site	TV	Result	Attendance	Ref.
September 29, 2012	2:00PM	Grand View	St. Ambrose (Iowa)	Brady Street Stadium • Davenport, Iowa (0)		29–26 ^{2 OT}	-	
September 29, 2012	2:30PM	Olivet Nazarene	William Penn	Oskaloosa Community Stadium • Oskaloosa, Iowa (0)		0–0	-	
September 29, 2012	3:30PM	St. Francis (IL)	Waldorf	A. David Bolstorff Field • Forest City, Iowa (0)		52–6	-	
September 29, 2012	6:00PM	Taylor	Siena Heights	O'Laughlin Stadium • Adrian, Michigan (0)		14–28	-	
September 29, 2012	7:00PM	Saint Francis (IN)	Saint Xavier	Bruce R. Deaton • Chicago, Illinois (0)		25–13	-	
September 29, 2012	8:00PM	Trinity International	Robert Morris (IL)	Morris Field • Arlington Heights, Illinois (0)		28–31	-	
^{#}Rankings from NAIA Coaches' Poll. All times are in Central Time.

=== Week 6 ===
Date	Time	Visiting team	Home team	Site	TV	Result	Attendance	Ref.
October 6, 2012	1:00PM	Olivet Nazarene	Siena Heights	O'Laughlin Stadium • Adrian, Michigan (0)		20–14 ^{3 OT}	-	
October 6, 2012	2:00PM	Waldorf	Grand View	Williams Stadium • Des Moines, Iowa (0)		0–51	-	
October 6, 2012	2:00PM	Concordia (MI)	Robert Morris (IL)	Morris Field • Arlington Heights, Illinois (0)		0–0	-	
October 6, 2012	2:00PM	St. Francis (IL)	William Penn	Oskaloosa Community Stadium • Oskaloosa, Iowa (0)		41–0	-	
October 6, 2012	3:00PM	Trinity International	Iowa Wesleyan	Lloyd Wilson Field • Hastings, Nebraska (0)		54–24	-	
October 6, 2012	7:00PM	Marian	Taylor	Joel Wiens Stadium • Hillsboro, Kansas (0)		49–21	-	
October 6, 2012	8:00PM	Saint Ambrose	Quincy	Flinn Stadium • Quincy, Illinois (0)		34–18	-	
^{#}Rankings from NAIA Coaches' Poll. All times are in Central Time.

=== Week 7 ===
Date	Time	Visiting team	Home team	Site	TV	Result	Attendance	Ref.
October 13, 2012	1:00PM	Taylor	Concordia (MI)	Riverbank Stadium • Ann Arbor, Michigan (Huron High School Riverbank Stadium)		34–7	-	
October 13, 2012	1:00PM	Saint Francis (IN)	Marian	St.Vincent Health Field • Indianapolis, Indiana (0)		38–45	-	
October 13, 2012	2:00PM	Iowa Wesleyan	St. Ambrose (Iowa)	Brady Street Stadium • Davenport, Iowa (Pleasant Valley High School)		14–23	-	
October 13, 2012	2:00PM	Olivet Nazarene	Waldorf	A. David Bolstorff Field • Forest City, Iowa (0)		42–43	-	
October 13, 2012	2:30PM	William Penn	University of St. Mary	Leslie Frazier Stadium • Deerfield, Illinois (0)		53–14	-	
October 13, 2012	5:00PM	Trinity International	Robert Morris (IL)	Morris Field • Arlington Heights, Illinois (0)		17–48	-	
October 13, 2012	6:00PM	Saint Xavier	Siena Heights	O'Laughlin Stadium • Adrian, Michigan (0)		45–7	-	
^{#}Rankings from NAIA Coaches' Poll. All times are in Central Time.

=== Week 8 ===
Date	Time	Visiting team	Home team	Site	TV	Result	Attendance	Ref.
October 20, 2012	1:00PM	Concordia (MI)	No. 1 Marian	St.Vincent Health Field • Indianapolis, Indiana (0)		0–0	-	
October 20, 2012	1:00PM	Saint Xavier	Taylor	Joel Wiens Stadium • Hillsboro, Kansas (0)		55–31	-	
October 20, 2012		Robert Morris (IL)	Ave Marie University	Governors Stadium • Clarksville, Tennessee (0)		21–0	-	
October 20, 2012		Siena Heights	Grand View	Williams Stadium • Des Moines, Iowa (0)		25–37	-	
October 20, 2012		Olivet Nazarene	St. Ambrose (Iowa)	Brady Street Stadium • Davenport, Iowa (0)		0–0	-	
October 20, 2012		Saint Francis (IN)	William Penn	Oskaloosa Community Stadium • Oskaloosa, Iowa (0)		28–19	-	
October 20, 2012		Waldorf	Iowa Wesleyan	Lloyd Wilson Field • Hastings, Nebraska (0)	0	65–66	-	
^{#}Rankings from NAIA Coaches' Poll. All times are in Central Time.

=== Week 9 ===
Date	Time	Visiting team	Home team	Site	TV	Result	Attendance	Ref.
October 27, 2012		Menlo College	Marian	St.Vincent Health Field • Indianapolis, Indiana (Hometown Heroes Day)	0	0–0	-	
October 27, 2012		Haskell Indian Nations University	Robert Morris (IL)	Morris Field • Arlington Heights, Illinois (0)	0	0–58	-	
October 27, 2012		Saint Ambrose	Waldorf	A. David Bolstorff Field • Forest City, Iowa (0)	0	48–21	-	
October 27, 2012		Siena Heights	Saint Francis (IN)	Bishop D'Arcy Stadium • Fort Wayne, Indiana (0)	0	0–0	-	
October 27, 2012		Grand View	St. Francis (IL)	Joliet Memorial Stadium • Joliet, Illinois (0)	0	23–13	-	
October 27, 2012		Concordia (MI)	Saint Xavier University	Bruce R. Deaton • Chicago, Illinois (0)	0	0–0	-	
October 27, 2012		William Penn	Trinity International	Leslie Frazier Stadium • Deerfield, Illinois (0)	0	36–25	-	
October 27, 2012		Iowa Wesleyan	Olivet Nazarene	Ward Field • Bourbonnais, Illinois (0)		28–39	-	
^{#}Rankings from NAIA Coaches' Poll. All times are in Central Time.

=== Week 10 ===
Date	Time	Visiting team	Home team	Site	TV	Result	Attendance	Ref.
November 3, 2012		Trinity International	Olivet Nazarene	Ward Field • Bourbonnais, Illinois (0)		39–41	-	
November 3, 2012		Siena Heights	Waldorf	A. David Bolstorff Field • Forest City, Iowa (0)		31–21	-	
November 3, 2012		Taylor	Saint Francis (IN)	Bishop D'Arcy Stadium • Fort Wayne, Indiana (0)		0–21	-	
November 3, 2012		Iowa Wesleyan	Grand View	Williams Stadium • Des Moines, Iowa (0)		0–0	-	
November 3, 2012		Marian	Saint Xavier University	Bruce R. Deaton • Chicago, Illinois (0)		0–0	-	
November 3, 2012		Robert Morris (IL)	Valley City State (N.D.)	Lokken Field • Valley City, North Dakota (0)		20–21	-	
November 3, 2012		Saint Ambrose	William Penn	Oskaloosa Community Stadium • Oskaloosa, Iowa (0)		20–17	-	
November 3, 2012		Menlo College	St. Francis (IL)	Joliet Memorial Stadium • Joliet, Illinois (0)		21–31	-	
^{#}Rankings from NAIA Coaches' Poll. All times are in Central Time.

=== Week 11 ===
Date	Time	Visiting team	Home team	Site	TV	Result	Attendance	Ref.
November 10, 2012		Iowa Wesleyan	Concordia (MI)	Riverbank Stadium • Ann Arbor, Michigan (Huron High School Riverbank Stadium)		41–7	-	
November 10, 2012		Olivet Nazarene	Taylor	Joel Wiens Stadium • Hillsboro, Kansas (0)		15–22	-	
November 10, 2012		Saint Francis (IN)	Lindenwood University-Belleville	Harlen C. Hunter Stadium • Saint Charles, Missouri (0)		44–7	-	
November 10, 2012		Saint Xavier	Robert Morris (IL)	Morris Field • Arlington Heights, Illinois (0)		28–19	-	
November 10, 2012		St. Francis (IL)	St. Ambrose (Iowa)	Brady Street Stadium • Davenport, Iowa (0)		20–35	-	
November 10, 2012		Waldorf	Trinity International	Leslie Frazier Stadium • Deerfield, Illinois (0)		24–49	-	
November 10, 2012		Grand View	William Penn	Oskaloosa Community Stadium • Oskaloosa, Iowa (0)		0–0	-	
^{#}Rankings from NAIA Coaches' Poll. All times are in Central Time.

== Postseason ==
=== First round ===
Date	Time	Visiting team	Home team	Site	TV	Result	Attendance	Ref.
November 17, 2012		Northwestern College	Marian	St.Vincent Health Field • Indianapolis, Indiana (NAIA Football Championship Series - Indianapolis)		32–42	-	
November 17, 2012		William Penn	Saint Xavier University	Bruce R. Deaton • Chicago, Illinois (NAIA Football Championship Series First Round)		0–31	-	
November 17, 2012		Baker University	Saint Francis (IN)	Bishop D'Arcy Stadium • Fort Wayne, Indiana (0)		17–22	-	
November 17, 2012		Southern Oregon University	St. Ambrose (Iowa)	Brady Street Stadium • Davenport, Iowa (NAIA Championship Series First Round)		45–28 ^{0}	-	
^{#}Rankings from NAIA Coaches' Poll. All times are in Central Time.

=== Quarterfinals ===
Date	Time	Visiting team	Home team	Site	TV	Result	Attendance	Ref.
November 24, 2012		Saint Francis (IN)	Marian	St.Vincent Health Field • Indianapolis, Indiana (NAIA FCS Quarterfinals - Indianapolis)	0	34–45	-	
November 24, 2012		Saint Xavier	University of the Cumberlands	Leslie Frazier Stadium • Deerfield, Illinois (NAIA Championship Series Quarterfinals - LIVE VIDEO)	0	35–21	-	
^{#}Rankings from NAIA Coaches' Poll. All times are in Central Time.

=== Semifinals ===
Date	Time	Visiting team	Home team	Site	TV	Result	Attendance	Ref.
December 1, 2012		Saint Xavier	Morningside College	Elwood Olsen Stadium • Sioux City, Iowa (NAIA Championship Series Semifinals LIVE VIDEO)	0	19–47	-	
December 1, 2012		Marian	Missouri Valley College	Gregg-Mitchell Field • Marshall, Missouri (NAIA FCS Semifinals - Marshall, Mo.)	0	20–17	-	
^{#}Rankings from NAIA Coaches' Poll. All times are in Central Time.

=== Finals ===
Date	Time	Visiting team	Home team	Site	TV	Result	Attendance	Ref.
December 13, 2012		Morningside College	Marian	0 • 0 (Russell Athletic-NAIA National Football Championship)	0	27–30 ^{1 OT}	-	
^{#}Rankings from NAIA Coaches' Poll. All times are in Central Time.
