= Ted Karras Jr. =

American football player and coach (born 1964)

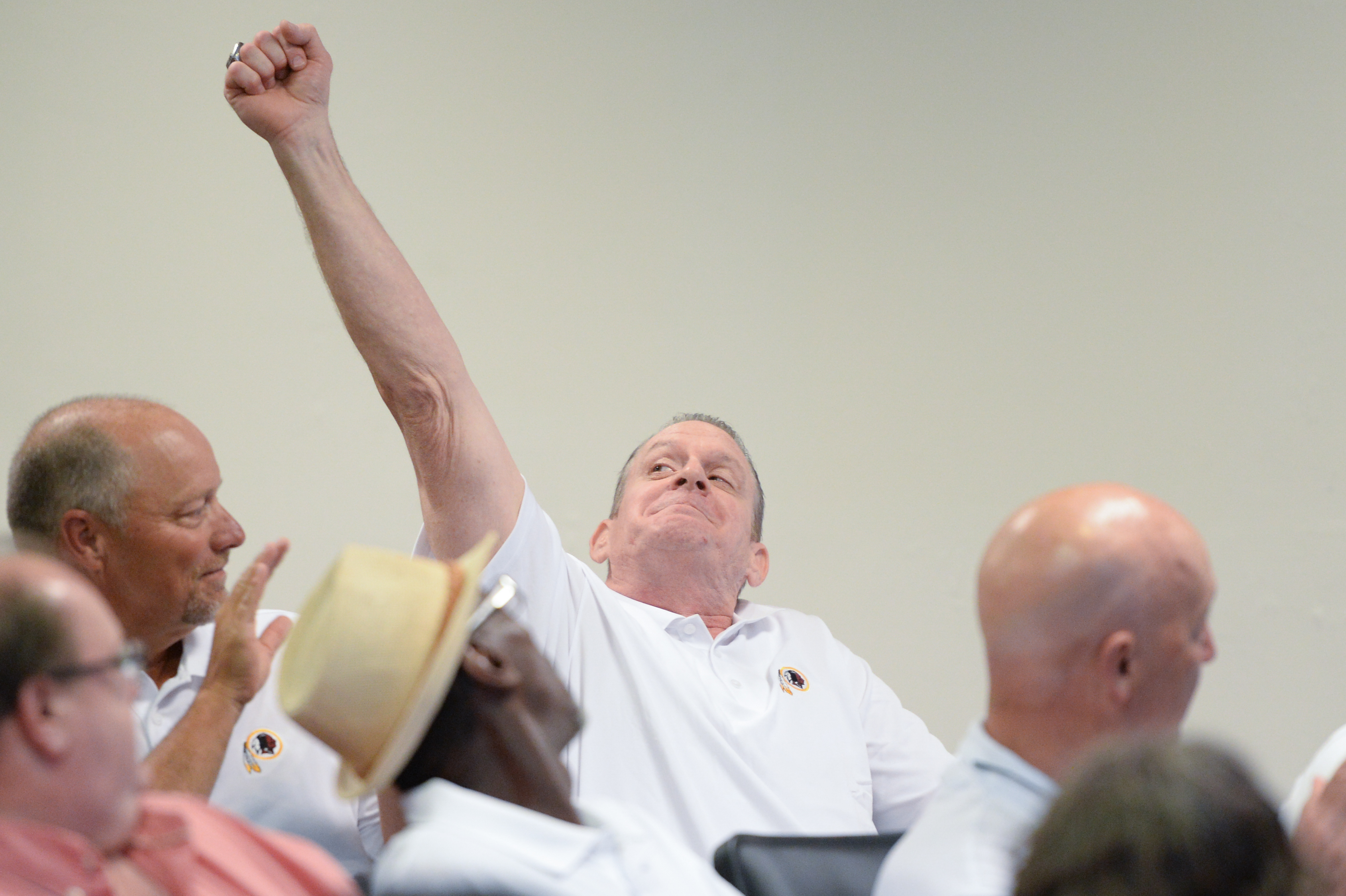
- Karras Jr. was a replacement player during the 1987 NFL strike and was part of the Redskins' replacement players that went 3-0. On June 12, 2018, they were awarded Super Bowl XXII rings.

Marian Knights
- Title: Head coach

Personal information
- Born: December 10, 1964 (age 61); Gary, Indiana, U.S.
- Listed height: 6 ft 2 in (1.88 m)
- Listed weight: 265 lb (120 kg)

Career information
- High school: Hobart (Hobart, Indiana)
- College: Northwestern
- NFL draft: 1987: undrafted

Career history

Playing
- Washington Redskins (1987)

Coaching
- Kankakee Valley HS (IN) (1989) Defensive line coach; Minnesota (1991) Graduate assistant; Northern Illinois (1992) Graduate assistant & defensive line coach; Lake Forest (1993–1994) Defensive coordinator; St. Francis (IL) (1995) Defensive line coach; Andrean HS (IN) (1996–1998) Head coach; Saint Xavier (1999–2002) Offensive coordinator; Rose-Hulman (2003–2005) Head coach; Marian (IN) (2007–2012) Head coach; Walsh (2013–2016) Head coach; Saint Francis (IN) (2022) Defensive line coach; Marian (IN) (2023–present) Head coach

Awards and highlights
- 1 NAIA Championship (2012); 3 MSFA (Mideast) championship (2011–2012, 2023)

Career NFL statistics
- Sacks: 1
- Stats at Pro Football Reference

Head coaching record
- Regular season: 92–77 (.544)
- Postseason: 7–4 (.636)
- Career: 99–81 (.550)

Theodore George Karras Jr. (born December 10, 1964) is an American college football coach and former player. He is the head football coach for Marian University, a position he first held from the program's inception in 2007 to 2012 and resumed in 2023. Karras was the head football coach at Rose–Hulman Institute of Technology in Terre Haute, Indiana from 2003 to 2005 and Walsh University in North Canton, Ohio from 2013 to 2016. He led the 2012 Marian Knights football team to the NAIA Football National Championship title.

== Playing career ==
Karras played college football as a defensive tackle at Northwestern from 1983 to 1986 and played one game as a replacement player with the Washington Redskins of the National Football League (NFL) during 1987 players' strike that inspired the movie The Replacements. His father, Ted Karras Sr., played for the Chicago Bears in the 1960s. His uncles also played in the NFL: Alex Karras for the Detroit Lions and Lou Karras for the Washington Redskins. His son, Ted Karras III, is currently in the NFL as the starting center for the Cincinnati Bengals.

== Coaching career ==
Karras was a graduate assistant at the University of Minnesota in 1991 and at Northern Illinois University in 1992. He then worked as a defensive assistant at Lake Forest College from 1993 to 1994 and as a defensive line coach at the University of St. Francis in 1995. In 1996, Karras became the head football coach for Andrean High School in Merrillville, Indiana, and took his team to the state championship, the first appearance in school history, where they lost to Bishop Chatard High School of Indianapolis. In 1999, Karras moved on to Saint Xavier University in Chicago as offensive coordinator. After four years at Saint Xavier, Karras moved to Terre Haute, Indiana to become head football coach at Rose-Hulman Institute of Technology. In 2006, Karras took the job of coaching the inaugural football team at Marian University.

In the football program's sixth year of play in 2012, Karras led the Knights to the 2012 NAIA Football National Championship, where they won 30–27 in overtime. After the 2012 football season, Karras left Marian to become the second head football coach in Walsh University's school history, replacing Jim Dennison. Walsh, located in North Canton, Ohio, formally introduced Karras as the Cavaliers' new head coach on December 21, 2012. At the end of the 2016 season, in which the Cavaliers compiled a 1–10 record, the worst in program history, Walsh University announced that Karras would no longer be coaching the team.

On December 22, 2022, Karras returned to Marian as head football coach for the 2023 season.

== Head coaching record ==
=== College ===
Year	Team	Overall	Conference	Standing	Bowl/playoffs	NAIA Coaches'^{#}
Rose–Hulman Fightin' Engineers (Southern Collegiate Athletic Conference) (2003–2005)
2003	Rose–Hulman	5–5	3–3	T–4th		
2004	Rose–Hulman	4–6	1–5	T–6th		
2005	Rose–Hulman	5–5	2–4	5th		
Rose–Hulman:		14–16	6–12			
Marian Knights (Mid-States Football Association) (2007–2012)
2007	Marian	1–9	1–6	7th (MEL)		
2008	Marian	7–4	2–4	5th (MEL)		
2009	Marian	6–5	3–4	5th (MEL)		
2010	Marian	10–3	5–2	3rd (MEL)	L NAIA Quarterfinal	7
2011	Marian	12–1	5–0	1st (MEL)	L NAIA Semifinal	3
2012	Marian	12–1	4–1	T–1st (MEL)	W NAIA Championship	1
Walsh Cavaliers (Great Lakes Intercollegiate Athletic Conference) (2013–2016)
2013	Walsh	3–8	3–6	T–4th (South)		
2014	Walsh	4–7	3–7	T–5th (South)		
2015	Walsh	2–8	2–8	T–5th (South)		
2016	Walsh	1–10	0–10	5th (South)		
Walsh:		10–33	8–31			
Marian Knights (Mid-States Football Association) (2023–present)
2023	Marian	9–2	6–1	T–1st (MEL)	L NAIA Second Round	5
2024	Marian	8–2	4–1	T–1st (MWL)		24
2025	Marian	8–4 (Note: During the 2025 season, Marian compiled an overall record of 10–1 in the regular season with a mark of 5–0 in conference play, winning the Mid-States Football Association's Midwest League title. The Knights advanced to the NAIA playoffs, where, after a first round bye, they defeated Dordt. However, Marian was removed from the NAIA playoffs prior to the team's quarterfinal game against Keiser due to self-reported player eligibility violation. The Vikings forfeited conference wins over Judson and Saint Xavier and the playoff victory over Dordt.)	3–2	3rd (MWL)	L NAIA Second Round	
2026	Marian	2–1	2–0	(MWL)		
Marian:		75–31	35–21			
Total:		99–81				
National championship Conference title Conference division title or championship game berth
^{#}Rankings from final NAIA Coaches' Poll.
