= ICMC =

ICMC may refer to:

- International Catholic Migration Commission
- International Computer Music Conference
- The Indiana College Mathematics Competition
- International Cryptographic Module Conference
- Integrated Currency Management Centre
- Inter College Music Competition
- Integrated Call Management Centre
