= 2012 NAIA football national championship =

2012 Russell Athletic NAIA Football National Championship
Marian Knights	Morningside Mustangs
(11-1)	(13-0)
30	27
Head coach: Ted Karras	Head coach: Steve Ryan
Coaches 5	Coaches 3
	1	2	3	4	OT	Total
Marian	7	3	0	17	3	30
Morningside	14	0	6	7	0	27
- Date: December 13, 2012
- Season: 2012
- Stadium: Barron Stadium
- Location: Rome, Georgia
- MVP: Mike Josifovski, Marian (offense); Robert Palmer, Marian (defense)
- Referee: Glen Welch; Nate Hudson; Todd Luedke; Larry Schmitt; Pat Bettise; Eric Obrigewitch; Joel Fuhrmann
- Attendance: 5,263

United States TV coverage
- Network: CBS Sports Network

The 2012 NAIA football national championship was played on December 13, 2012 as the 57th Annual Russell Athletic NAIA Football National Championship. The game matched the once-beaten and 5th-ranked Knights from Marian University against the undefeated and 3rd-ranked Mustangs from Morningside College. The game matched two teams making their first appearance in the championship game, assuring someone would win the title for the first time. The teams proved to be evenly matched, and the outcome was not decided until the winning points were scored in the first round of overtime. With their winning field goal, the Marian Knights prevailed, 30-27 in the first overtime game in NAIA football championship history.

The championship game was played at Barron Stadium in Rome, Georgia. A total of sixteen teams participated in the single-elimination tournament from across the country. Placement in the tournament was based on the final edition of the 2012 NAIA Coaches' Poll. This year's field included the top 15 teams from the final poll as well as #18 Bethel (TN). Two teams were bypassed as a result of the automatic berth granted to Bethel, champions of the Mid-South Conference West Division.

== Scoring summary ==
Scoring summary

Quarter	Time	Drive			Team	Scoring information	Score	
Quarter	Time	Plays	Yards	TOP	Team	Scoring information	Marian Knights	Morningside Mustangs
1	10:25	7	70	2:54	Morningside Mustangs	Fred Jones 10-yard touchdown run, Ty Littzen kick Good	0	7
1	6:19	1	7	0:10	Marian Knights	Tevin Lake 7-yard touchdown run, Mike Josifovski kick Good	7	7
1	1:44	8	70	4:35	Morningside Mustangs	Joel McCabe 6-yard touchdown reception from Joel Nixon, David Galloway kick Good	7	14
2	3:55	7	38	2:57	Marian Knights	36-yard field goal by Mike Josifovski	10	14
3	9:34	13	78	5:26	Morningside Mustangs	Fred Jones 1-yard touchdown run, Ty Littzen kick Failed	10	20
4	7:33	11	88	3:30	Marian Knights	Tevin Lake 4-yard touchdown run, Mike Josifovski kick Good	17	20
4	2:46	7	72	3:16	Marian Knights	Nathan Jones 61-yard touchdown reception from Adam Wiese, Mike Josifovski kick Good	24	20
4	1:04	8	67	1:42	Morningside Mustangs	Kyle Schuck 7-yard touchdown reception from Joel Nixon, David Galloway kick Good	24	27
4	0:00	11	50	1:04	Marian Knights	35-yard field goal by Mike Josifovski	27	27
Overtime	-	5	16	-	Marian Knights	26-yard field goal by Mike Josifovski	30	27
"TOP" = time of possession. For other American football terms, see Glossary of American football.							Marian Knights	Morningside Mustangs

== Tournament bracket ==
1st Round; November 17
3	Morningside (IA) (10–0)	40
14	Montana Tech (8–2)	35
8	St. Ambrose (IA) (9–1)	28
10	Southern Oregon (8–2)	45
4	Saint Xavier (IL) (9–1)	31
13	William Penn (IA) (9–2)	0
7	Cumberlands (KY) (9–1)	42
9	MidAmerica Nazarene (KS) (8–2)	24
2	Missouri Valley (10–0)	56
15	Ottawa (KS) (8–2)	21
1	Georgetown (KY) (10–0)	44
18	Bethel (TN) (8–3)	45
5	Marian (IN) (8–1)	42
12	Northwestern (IA) (9–2)	32
6	Saint Francis (IN) (8–2)	22
11	Baker (KS) (8–2)	17

Quarterfinals; November 24
3	Morningside (IA) (11–0)	47*
10	Southern Oregon (9–2)	44
4	Saint Xavier (IL) (10–1)	35
7	Cumberlands (KY) (10–1)	21
2	Missouri Valley (11–0)	10
18	Bethel (TN) (9–3)	7
5	Marian (IN) (9–1)	45
6	Saint Francis (IN) (9–2)	34

Semifinals; December 1
3	Morningside (IA) (12–0)	47
4	Saint Xavier (IL) (11–1)	19
2	Missouri Valley (12–0)	17
5	Marian (IN) (10–1)	20

Championship; December 13
3	Morningside (IA) (13–0)	27
5	Marian (IN) (11–1)	30*

== Conference standings ==
2012 Frontier Conference football standings
	Conf.			Overall
Team	W		L	W		L
No. 5 Southern Oregon +^	8	–	2	9	–	3
No. 12 Montana Tech +^	8	–	2	8	–	3
No. 21 Carroll (MT)	7	–	3	7	–	4
Rocky Mountain	5	–	5	6	–	5
Eastern Oregon	4	–	6	4	–	6
Montana Western	4	–	6	4	–	6
Montana State–Northern	3	–	7	3	–	7
Dickinson State	1	–	9	2	–	9
+ – Conference co-champions; ^ – NAIA playoff participant; Rankings from NAIA Coaches' Poll

2012 Great Plains Athletic Conference football standings
	Conf.			Overall
Team	W		L	W		L
No. 2 Morningside $^	9	–	0	13	–	1
No. 12 Northwestern (IA) ^	7	–	2	9	–	3
No. 20 Doane	6	–	3	7	–	3
Dakota Wesleyan	5	–	4	6	–	4
Hastings	5	–	4	6	–	4
Nebraska Wesleyan	5	–	4	6	–	4
Concordia (NE)	4	–	5	5	–	6
Midland	3	–	6	4	–	6
Briar Cliff	1	–	8	1	–	10
Dordt	0	–	9	2	–	9
$ – Conference champion; ^ – NAIA playoff participant; Rankings from NAIA Coaches' Poll

2012 Heart of America Athletic Conference football standings
	Conf.			Overall
Team	W		L	W		L
No. 3 Missouri Valley $^	9	–	0	12	–	1
No. 12 MidAmerica Nazarene ^	8	–	1	8	–	3
No. 14 Baker ^	7	–	2	8	–	3
No. 23 Evangel	6	–	3	7	–	4
No. 22 Benedictine (KS)	5	–	4	7	–	4
Graceland	4	–	5	6	–	5
Peru State	3	–	6	5	–	6
Culver–Stockton	2*	–	7*	3*	–	8*
Avila	1*	–	8*	1*	–	10*
Central Methodist	0*	–	9*	0*	–	10*
$ – Conference champion; ^ – NAIA playoff participant *Central Methodist and Avila later forfeited their wins, giving Culver–Stockton two wins and Avila a win over Central Methodist.; Rankings from NAIA Coaches' Poll

2012 Kansas Collegiate Athletic Conference football standings
	Conf.			Overall
Team	W		L	W		L
No. 16 Ottawa $^	8	–	1	8	–	3
No. 18 Tabor	7	–	1	8	–	2
Kansas Wesleyan	6	–	3	6	–	5
Saint Mary (KS)	6	–	3	6	–	5
Friends	5	–	4	6	–	5
McPherson	4	–	4	4	–	5
Southwestern (KS)	3	–	6	4	–	7
Sterling	3	–	6	3	–	7
Bethany (KS)	2	–	7	4	–	7
Bethel (KS)	0	–	9	0	–	10
$ – Conference champion; ^ – NAIA playoff participant; Rankings from NAIA Coaches' Poll

2012 Mid-South Conference football standings
	Conf.			Overall
Team	W		L	W		L
East Division
No. 8 Georgetown (KY) x^	5	–	0	10	–	1
No. 7 Cumberlands (KY) ^	4	–	1	10	–	2
No. 25 Kentucky Christian	3	–	2	7	–	4
Union (KY)	1	–	4	4	–	7
Pikeville	1	–	4	3	–	8
Virginia–Wise	1	–	4	3	–	8
West Division
No. 9 Bethel (TN) x^	6	–	0	9	–	4
No. 19 Cumberland (TN)	4	–	2	8	–	3
Belhaven	4	–	2	6	–	5
Faulkner	4	–	2	6	–	5
Campbellsville	2	–	4	3	–	8
Lindsey Wilson	1	–	5	3	–	8
Bluefield	0	–	6	0	–	11
x – Division champion/co-champions; ^ – NAIA playoff participant; Rankings from NAIA Coaches' Poll

2012 Mid-States Football Association standings
	Conf.			Overall
Team	W		L	W		L
Mideast League
No. 1 Marian (IN) x^	4	–	1	12	–	1
No. 4 Saint Xavier x^	4	–	1	11	–	2
No. 6 St. Francis (IN) x^	4	–	1	9	–	3
Siena Heights	2	–	3	4	–	6
Taylor	1	–	4	4	–	6
Concordia (MI)	0	–	5	0	–	9
Midwest League
No. 10 St. Ambrose x^	5	–	1	9	–	2
No. 15 William Penn x^	5	–	1	9	–	3
No. 17 Grand View x	5	–	1	8	–	3
St. Francis (IL)	3	–	3	6	–	5
Trinity International	1	–	5	4	–	7
Waldorf	1	–	5	4	–	7
Olivet Nazarene	1	–	5	3	–	8
x – League champion/co-champions ^ – NAIA playoff participant; Rankings from NAIA Coaches' Poll

2012 NAIA independents football records
	Conf.			Overall
Team	W		L	W		L
Robert Morris (IL)		–		8	–	3
No. 24 Valley City State		–		7	–	3
Bacone		–		7	–	4
Langston		–		6	–	4
Edward Waters		–		5	–	6
Jamestown		–		4	–	6
Lindenwood–Belleville		–		4	–	6
Mayville State		–		4	–	6
Menlo		–		4	–	6
SAGU		–		4	–	6
Southern Virginia		–		4	–	6
Webber International		–		4	–	6
Point		–		2	–	8
Wayland Baptist		–		2	–	8
Dakota State		–		2	–	9
Texas College		–		2	–	9
Ave Maria		–		1	–	7
Haskell		–		1	–	8
Rankings from NAIA Coaches' Poll

- * denotes OT.

== Game details ==
=== First round ===
==== #15 Ottawa (KS) at #2 Missouri Valley ====
	1	2	3	4	Total
#15 Ottawa (KS)	0	7	7	7	21
#2 Missouri Valley	15	15	7	19	56

Missouri Valley finished the regular season with its third consecutive conference championship and an undefeated 10–0 record, while Ottawa entered into the game with its second consecutive conference championship and a record of 8–2. Missouri Valley earned the home field advantage for the first round.

Missouri Valley scored 15 points in the first quarter and held Ottawa to zero, and held that lead for the entire game. Missouri Valley averaged 6.9 yards per play while holding Ottawa to 2.7. Missouri Valley's 487 total yards was made up of 229 yards rushing and 258 passing. With 13:46 left in the second quarter, Ottawa scored and managed to bring the score within eight points, but Missouri Valley pulled further away to a victorious final score of 56–21.

==== #18 Bethel (TN) at #1 Georgetown (KY) ====
	1	2	3	4	Total
#18 Bethel (TN)	6	7	13	19	45
#1 Georgetown (KY)	7	17	7	13	44

Bethel was a big underdog, favored to lose to Georgetown by 30 points. However, they came into the game and won on a fake PAT after a 47-yard Hail Mary that appeared to only bring the game to overtime. The whole sequence in the final minute of the game was phenomenal. After Bethel was stopped on fourth down near mid-field, they still stopped Georgetown and forced a punt. However, Georgetown was able to run down the clock to 44 seconds left and downed the punt at the 6-yard line, leaving Bethel the other 94 yards to go and no timeouts. Some fans started leaving and most assumed that the game was basically done. However, after two quick first down completions, Bethel had 31 seconds left on their 45, and some hope started to show. Ultimately, it came down to 4th and 2 on the Georgetown 47-yard line with 7 seconds left, an obvious Hail Mary situation when you are down 7 points. The pass was aimed at the front of the right side of the endzone. It was knocked down, yet that deflection was caught at the 6-yard line. Instead of trying to charge for the endzone right in front of him, the receiver saw another receiver running to the middle part of the endzone. He went unnoticed by the defense, as they thought that all of the receivers would be where the ball was thrown. The receiver with the ball casually threw it back to the open receiver, who went easily into the endzone. The mostly Georgetown fan filled crowd was in stunned silence, besides the few Bethel fans. Bethel got their special teams on the field rather quickly, considering that most players were jumping around and celebrating the play before. Georgetown was out of timeouts and couldn't "ice the kicker" by calling a timeout and allowing the kicker to see the importance of the kick, making him nervous. However, there was no kick; Bethel pulled off a fake PAT kick, where the lineman on the edge of the line ran out into the open field, as Georgetown didn't have time to fully get itself set. In fact, there was a penalty on Georgetown for too many men on the field, which Bethel obviously declined. After the game, Bethel coach Roger Diplomatie said that the lateral on the Hail Mary wasn't designed to happen, however it was planned for an extra receiver to be away from the pass for exactly what happened. As for the PAT, Roger said that he only told the special teams players on the field that they were going to do the fake. He did this as to avoid the sideline going serious, knowing that it is a tough play to execute if the defense does a different scheme than he had thought; in fact most players didn't even realize that they had gone for two because they assumed that they were going to get the easy one point kick. Most players admitted their surprise, though they were just happy that they still won. Coach Roger said that "Hadn't we gone for two, the crowd could have gotten loud again and [Georgetown] likely would have beaten us in overtime... sometimes, things just can't last too long." The game set multiple records, being only the third time that an 18 seed beat a seed in the first round, and it spoiled Georgetown's first postseason appearance as a 1 seed. It set a record for most safeties scored in a postseason game with one for each team and they were the first points scored, oddly enough, which caused the score of 2-2 to be held in a game for the first known time in college or professional history. It had the most combined touchdowns (11) in a postseason game since 2001. Georgetown kick return specialist Anthony Henson became the first player to return two kicks 95+ yards in the same game. It was also the first time that each team scored at least twice on offense, defense, and special teams (the fake PAT counts as special teams).

Scoring summary

1st quarter- G- Safety (G 2-0) B- Safety (T 2-2) B- 39-yard run, kick PAT (B 9-2) G- 98-yard kick return, kick PAT (T 9-9)

2nd quarter- G- 56-yard interception return, kick PAT (G 16-9) B- 68-yard punt return, kick PAT (T 16-16) B- 12-yard fumble recovery return, kick PAT (B 23-16)

3rd quarter- B- 81-yard interception return, kick PAT (B 30-16) G- 96-yard kick return, kick PAT (B 30-23) G- 4-yard pass, kick PAT (T 30-30)

4th quarter- G- 23-yard run, kick PAT (G 37-30) B- 16-yard pass, kick PAT (T 37-37) G- 33-yard pass, kick PAT (G 44-37) B- 47-yard pass, pass for 2PT conversion (B 45-44)

==== #12 Northwestern (IA) at #5 Marian (IN) ====
	1	2	3	4	Total
#12 Northwestern (IA)	7	6	11	8	32
#5 Marian (IN)	7	14	7	14	42

==== #11 Baker (KS) at #6 Saint Francis (IN) ====
	1	2	3	4	Total
#11 Baker (KS)	0	10	0	7	17
#6 Saint Francis (IN)	6	10	0	6	22

Before the game, a fan seated behind me was overheard to employ an unusual method of predicting the outcome. USF was ranked #6; Baker was ranked #11. Therefore, USF would win by 5. Scientific or not, the fan's prediction proved to be prophetic as USF prevailed in the contest by a final score of 22-17.

The game's outcome was largely determined by a USF defense that would bend but not break. After winning the opening coin flip, Baker elected to receive. Saint Francis kicked the ball into the endzone, and Baker started at their own 25 after the touchback. A few plays later, the defense responded with the first interception of the game, and USF took over deep in Baker territory. The turnover led to the first score of the game, an 11-yard pass to give the Cougars a 6-0 lead. No other scores were logged in the first quarter.

In the second quarter, USF tacked on a field goal after the defense forced and recovered a Baker fumble. It was the first of 3 on the day for the Cougar placekicker, tying the school's record for most field goals in one game. Baker took the ensuing kickoff and marched in for their first score of the game, narrowing the USF lead to 9-7. USF then took over on offense and produced their best sustained drive of the game. With 33 seconds left in the first half, the Cougars’ quarterback scored on a 13-yard scamper into the end zone to bring the score to 16-7. Not to be outdone, Baker took the following kickoff and marched close enough to kick a field goal with 10 seconds left to bring the halftime score to 16-10 in favor of Saint Francis.

The third quarter was a back-and-forth defensive struggle, and neither team scored.

The fourth quarter saw Saint Francis convert their second field goal. But Baker took the kickoff and marched the length of the field, scoring another touchdown that narrowed the gap to 19-17 in favor of the home team. USF responded by kicking their third field goal, extending the margin to 5, with 3:44 left in the game. The outcome of the game was uncertain until USF intercepted a Baker pass with 2:33 left in the game. After that, Saint Francis ran out the clock with Baker having only two timeouts to halt the runoff.

On the day, the USF defense captured 4 Baker turnovers, 2 interceptions and 2 fumble recoveries. Although the Baker offense outgained the Cougars, the Cougar defense came through with big plays to stop Baker's momentum most of the time. The win was the 17th consecutive home playoff win for USF, who has not lost a home game in their entire playoff history.

==== #14 Montana Tech at #3 Morningside (IA) ====
	1	2	3	4	Total
#14 Montana Tech	13	7	2	13	35
#3 Morningside (IA)	0	34	0	6	40

==== #10 Southern Oregon at #8 St. Ambrose (IA) ====
	1	2	3	4	Total
#10 Southern Oregon	17	0	0	28	45
#8 St. Ambrose (IA)	6	22	0	0	28

==== #13 William Penn (IA) at #4 Saint Xavier (IL) ====
	1	2	3	4	Total
#13 William Penn (IA)	0	0	0	0	0
#4 Saint Xavier (IL)	3	16	6	6	31

==== #9 MidAmerica Nazarene (KS) at #7 Cumberlands (KY) ====
	1	2	3	4	Total
#9 MidAmerica Nazarene (KS)	0	10	7	7	24
#7 Cumberlands (KY)	14	7	7	14	42

=== Quarterfinals ===
==== #18 Bethel (TN) at #2 Missouri Valley ====
	1	2	3	4	Total
#18 Bethel (TN)	0	0	0	7	7
#2 Missouri Valley	7	0	0	3	10

==== #6 Saint Francis (IN) at #5 Marian (IN) ====
	1	2	3	4	Total
#6 Saint Francis (IN)	7	0	7	20	34
#5 Marian (IN)	7	10	13	15	45

These two teams met earlier in a regular season game at the same field, and the outcome of this one was very similar to the earlier match. Saint Francis played an inspired game; but in the end, the Cougars were no match for the offensive efficiency that was displayed by the Marian Knights.

Saint Francis received the opening kickoff and sustained a drive that resulted in a score and a 7-0 lead. They kicked the ball to Marian, who lost possession when a downfield bomb was intercepted by the USF defender. At that point the Cougars were in control, but the momentum eventually shifted and stayed with Marian for the remainder of the game. Marian scored with about 3 minutes left on the clock, and the first quarter ended tied, 7-7.

An efficient passing game and the ability to maintain control of the ball were two of Marian's biggest assets. Marian's offense kept the ball for about 11 minutes in the second quarter, producing a field goal and a late touchdown to bring the halftime score to 17-7 in their favor.

The third quarter opened with Marian returning to offense. But the Cougars’ defense held, and the Knights kicked the ball. The Cougars misplayed the punt, and Marian recovered. That drive ended with a USF interception. But the Cougars’ offense failed to move the chains in 3 plays, and a USF punt sent the ball to Marian's 11-yard line. Marian went 3-and-out, and USF was set to receive the ball once again. A poor punt never made it to the midfield line, giving USF great field position. Unfortunately, a Cougars defensive player ran into the kicker, and that penalty allowed Marian to retain possession of the football. The error proved costly as Marian drove the ball for a touchdown that extended the lead to 24-7. USF took the kick and marched for a touchdown of their own to move the score to 24-14. The Knights immediately countered by returning the ensuing kickoff for a touchdown. After a missed extra point, the quarter ended with Marian leading 30-14.

Early in the 4th quarter, USF drove for a touchdown to bring the lead back to 30-21. The Cougars played good defense, and Marian punted the ball back to the Cougars. But the next possession saw two dropped passes before the third attempt was intercepted by the Knights. Most of the rest of the quarter was burned up by Marian's offense, who held the ball for nearly 12 minutes of the period. Marian marched for a score, and a 2-point conversion extended their lead to 38-21. The next kick was immediately returned for a 100-yard touchdown by the Cougars’ Austin Coleman. For Coleman, the touchdown return was the 8th in his career, setting a new NAIA record for most touchdown returns in a career. Marian again took over on offense, and they drove the ball for their final points of the game, making the score 45-28. A late Cougars’ touchdown with 12 seconds left on the clock made the final score 45-34 after the Cougars failed to convert a 2-point pass attempt.

==== #10 Southern Oregon at #3 Morningside (IA) ====
	1	2	3	4	OT	Total
#10 Southern Oregon	7	14	14	6	3	44
#3 Morningside (IA)	14	21	0	6	6	47

==== #7 Cumberlands (KY) at #4 Saint Xavier (IL) ====
	1	2	3	4	Total
#7 Cumberlands (KY)	7	7	7	0	21
#4 Saint Xavier (IL)	9	14	9	3	35

=== Semifinals ===
With wins by each of the 4 quarterfinal home teams, the semifinal brackets provided the expected matchups. Two undefeated home teams played host to 2 visitors having 1 loss each.

==== #5 Marian (IN) at #2 Missouri Valley ====
	1	2	3	4	Total
#5 Marian (IN)	3	6	8	3	20
#2 Missouri Valley	3	7	7	0	17

==== #4 Saint Xavier (IL) at #3 Morningside (IA) ====
	1	2	3	4	Total
#4 Saint Xavier	16	3	0	0	19
#3 Morningside (IA)	21	6	14	6	47

=== Championship Game ===
==== #5 Marian (IN) vs. #3 Morningside (IA) ====
	1	2	3	4	OT	Total
#5 Marian (IN)	7	3	0	17	3	30
#3 Morningside (IA)	14	0	6	7	0	27
