= The Indiana College Mathematics Competition =

The Indiana College Mathematics Competition, originally The Friendly Mathematics Competition, is held each year by the Indiana Section of the Mathematical Association of America.

== History ==
"The Friendly Mathematics Competition" was founded at Wabash College in 1965 by Professor Paul T. Mielke. Today it is known as "The Indiana College Mathematics Competition."

The Competition has emphasized collegiality and teamwork from the very beginning, earning its sobriquet "The Friendly Exam" because of the (relatively) noncompetitive ambience created during the contest. Students within a team cooperate and the teams submit one solution per question. Each team determines how to manage its work and time: Some teams are truly collaborative, whereas others carry out a divide and conquer strategy, with different members working on different problems. The number of problems varies from six to eight per year, and no calculators are allowed. Since 1978, the competition has been a part of the spring meeting of the Indiana Section of the MAA.

As is consistent with the "friendly" nature of the competition, each year's problems include "some problems everyone should be able to do," along with those that challenge and allow for distinguishing among the problem solvers. (One problem statement on the 1968 exam was false!) Many problems are classics borrowed from various sources.

== Early Competitions ==
=== Exam #1 - 1966 ===
The first "friendly competition" was held at Wabash College, located in Crawfordsville, a bit northwest of Indianapolis. Eight schools participated in the competition that year. It was won by the team from Wabash College consisting of James Clynch, Albert Hart Jr., and Larry Haugh.

=== Exam #2 - 1967 ===
This competition was held at Marian College in Indianapolis. The winning team, consisting of David Hafling, Albert Hart Jr., and Robert Spear was again from Wabash College,

== Sample Question ==
A sample question from 1968:

"Let us assume that a given pair of people either know each other or are strangers. If six people enter a room, show that there must be at least three people who know each other pairwise or there must be at least three people who are pairwise strangers."

== See also ==
- Marian College
- Wabash College
