= Marian University (Indiana) =

Catholic university in Indianapolis, Indiana, US

- Former names: St. Francis Normal School (1851–1936); Immaculate Conception Junior College (1924–1936); Marian College (1936–2009); Ancilla Domini College (1937–2021); Marian University's Ancilla College (2021–2026)
- Motto: Sedes sapientiae (Latin)
- Motto in English: "Seat of Wisdom"
- Type: Private university
- Established: 1851; 175 years ago
- Accreditation: HLC
- Religious affiliation: Roman Catholic (Sisters of St. Francis)
- Academic affiliations: ACCU; NAICU
- Endowment: $184.3 million (2026)
- Chancellor: Kenith Britt
- President: Daniel J. Elsener
- Provost: Binh Q. Tran
- Academic staff: 166 full time
- Students: 3,595
- Undergraduates: 2,431
- Postgraduates: 1,164
- Doctoral students: 650
- Location: Indianapolis, Indiana, United States; 39°48′51″N 86°12′11″W
- Campus: 120 acres (0.49 km^{2}); Large city
- Other campuses: Plymouth; Donaldson
- Newspaper: The Marian Phoenix
- Colors: Dark blue, gold, and old gold
- Nickname: Knights
- Sporting affiliations: NAIA – Crossroads; MSFA
- Mascot: Knightro
- Website: marian.edu
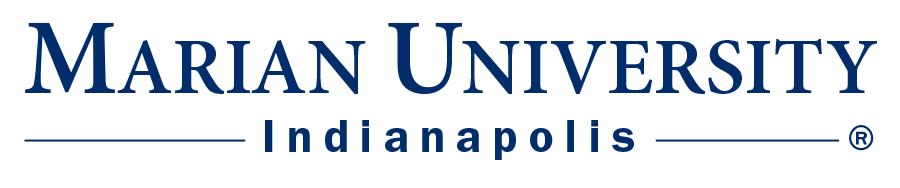

Marian University is a private Roman Catholic university in Indianapolis, Indiana, United States. Founded in 1851 by the Sisters of St. Francis in Oldenburg, Indiana, the college moved to Indianapolis in 1937. Marian was known as Marian College from 1936 until 2009. As of 2017, enrollment included 2,431 undergraduate students, 1,164 graduate students, and 650 doctoral students. Marian University athletes have won national championships in several sports.

== History ==
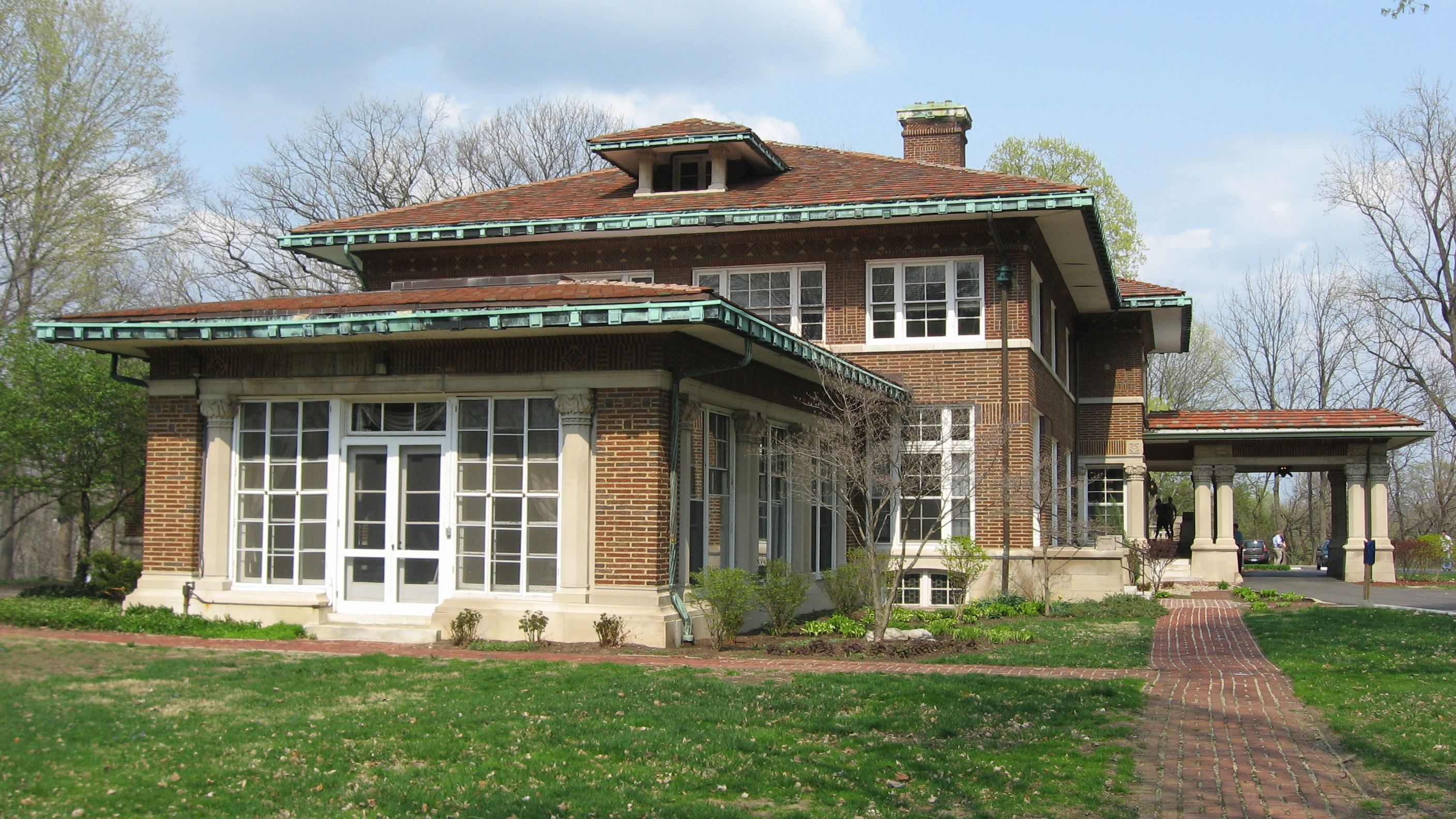
The Allison Mansion

Marian University was founded in 1851 by the Sisters of St. Francis, Oldenburg, Indiana, as a liberal arts school with a program for training teachers. Under the direction of Father Francis Joseph Rudolph and Mother Theresa Hackelmeier, teachers were trained at Oldenburg for more than a decade before Indiana adopted its first tax-supported normal school.

Originally known as St. Francis Normal, the school became a four-year, state-approved institution which merged with Immaculate Conception Junior College to form Marian College. In November 1936, the Sisters of St. Francis purchased the former James A. Allison estate, "Riverdale", located in Indianapolis, as a site for Marian College.

In 1937, the institution moved to Indianapolis under the direction of Mother M. Clarissa Dillhoff, after securing a state charter and purchasing the Riverdale estate in 1936. Allison Mansion became the new location of Marian College. The building housed the library, administrative offices, classrooms, and sleeping quarters for the Sisters. Classes began on September 15, 1937.

In 1948 the institution began an expansion project that included the addition of Clare Hall, the Gymnasium, and Marian Hall. In 1954, as the new Marian Hall was completed, the institution became the first co-educational Catholic college in Indiana. Two years later, the North Central Association accredited Marian College.

The university's Modernist-style library was designed by Indianapolis architect Evans Woollen III and completed in 1966. The library's square form has an exposed structural frame.

The National Council for Accreditation of Teacher Education formally accepted all teacher education programs of the college in 1976. The Indiana State Board of Nursing approved the associate level nursing curriculum in 1977 and the baccalaureate program in 1987. The National League of Nursing has accredited both programs—the associate in 1986 and the baccalaureate in 1992. In 2000, Marian's Adult Programs (MAP) began offering bachelor's and associate degrees in business.

On July 1, 2009, Marian College became Marian University. On January 15, 2010, Marian University announced receipt of a $30 million pledge from an anonymous donor to establish a college of osteopathic medicine that would be the second medical school in the state of Indiana and the first Catholic osteopathic medical school. On August 23, 2011, during the groundbreaking ceremony, the new school of osteopathic medicine building was officially named after the originally anonymous donor, AIT Labs CEO Michael A. Evans. Additionally, Margaret Mary Community Hospital pledged $150,000 to the College of Osteopathic Medicine dedicated to building a simulation lab and seminar room for the medical students.

In July 2021, Ancilla College merged with Marian and opened as Marian University's Ancilla College in Donaldson, Indiana. In July 2026, Marian University's Ancilla College became Marian University–Plymouth.

== Campus ==
Marian University is located about four miles (6.4 km) northwest of downtown Indianapolis, on a 200-acre (81 ha) campus. The Marian University campus includes:

- The Nina Mason Pulliam EcoLab, a 75-acre (30 ha) wetland and lowland forest located on the north end of the Marian University campus.
- The Riverdale Estate, which includes Allison Mansion and Indiana's largest and most intact landscape designed by Jens Jensen. The mansion holds the offices of the president.
- The Lake Sullivan Sports Complex, now known as the Indy Cycloplex, which Marian operates for the City of Indianapolis Parks and Recreation Department. This park is home to the Major Taylor Velodrome and Indy Cycloplex BMX track, as well as single track MTB trails and a dual slalom course, and hosts races, clinics, and other events in all cycling disciplines, as well as community events.

== Academics ==
As of 2017, Marian University served 2,431 undergraduate students, 1,164 graduate students, and 650 medical students with a student-faculty ratio of 14:1. Marian University is accredited by North Central Association of Colleges and Schools.

Marian University is organized into six schools with 40+ majors.

- School of Business
- Tom and Julie Wood College of Osteopathic Medicine
- College of Arts and Sciences
- Fred S. Klipsch Educators College
- Alan and Sue Leighton School of Nursing
- E. S. Witchger School of Engineering

Marian University offers several routes to earning a teaching license via Indianapolis Teaching Fellows, traditional education program, Master's Bridge to Teaching, the Master of Arts in Teaching program, and the ACTION program. Marian University is one of the few universities to offer the Leadership Academy for Principals.

Marian University Leighton School of Nursing offers several degree programs including an online Accelerated BSN program that can be completed in as few as 16 months.

Marian University's Tom and Julie College of Osteopathic Medicine opened in August 2013 with the first-class graduated 133 doctors of osteopathic medicine. The university also offers accelerated degree programs in business for adults through Marian's Adult Programs (MAP).

On the Ancilla College campus, eight degree programs are offered as of Fall of 2025. These include a Bachelor's in Elementary Education and Nursing as well as Associate's in Agriculture, Business, Education, Exercise Science, Liberal Arts, and Veterinary Nursing.

== Student life ==
The Student Government Association of Marian University (SGA) is actively involved with campus events such as homecoming and the fall festival. Intramural sports are popular, especially basketball, flag football, and ultimate frisbee. The speech team competes regularly; Audra Casterline, a member of the speech team was named Miss Indiana in 2014.

There are nearly 30 student run clubs and organizations at Marian University.

Adjacent to campus, though not located on campus property, is Bishop Simon Bruté College Seminary, a college seminary for Catholic seminarians, operated by the Archdiocese of Indianapolis. Approximately 20-30 young men, who are also Marian students, live at the seminary and receive formation there.

== Athletics ==
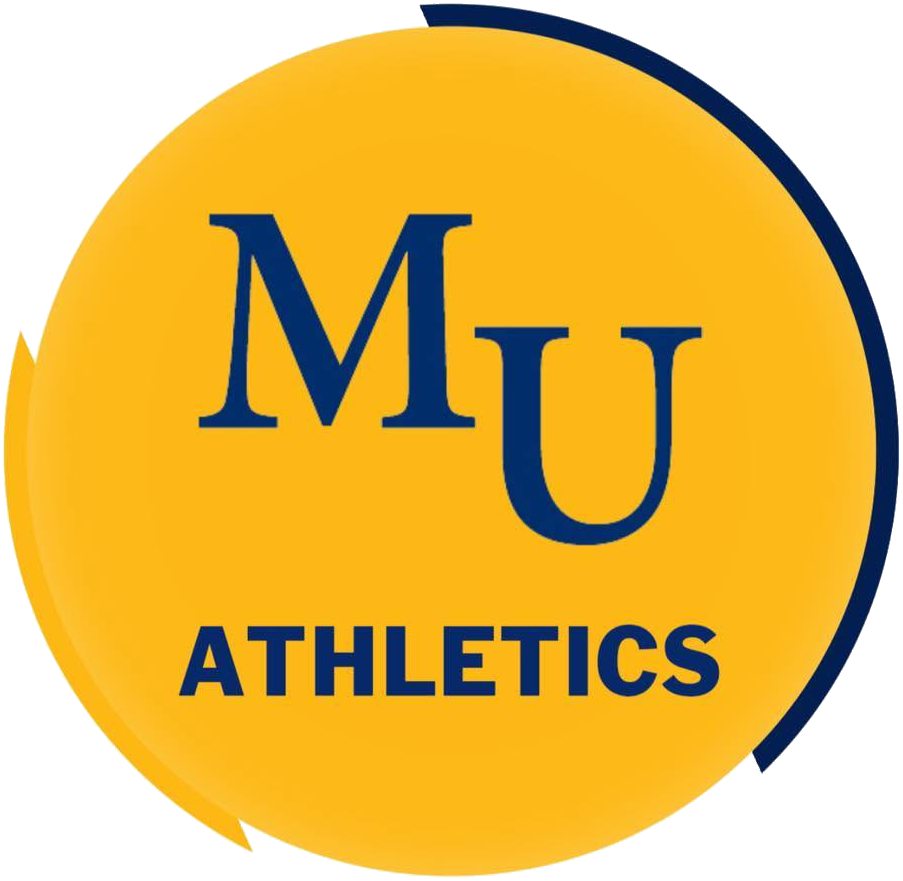
MU athletics monogram

The Marian athletic teams are called the Knights. The university is a member of the National Association of Intercollegiate Athletics (NAIA), primarily competing in the Crossroads League (formerly known as the Mid-Central College Conference (MCCC) until after the 2011–12 school year) for most of its sports since the 1987–88 academic year; while its football team competes in the Mideast League of the Mid-States Football Association (MSFA).

Marian competes in 24 intercollegiate varsity sports:

Men's sports	Women's sports
Baseball	Basketball
Basketball	Bowling
Bowling	Cross country
Football	Golf
Golf	Lacrosse
Rugby	Soccer
Soccer	Softball
Tennis	Tennis
Track and field	Track and field
Wrestling	Volleyball
Co-ed sports
Cheerleading
Cycling
Dance

The university's mascot is Knightro, the Knight.

=== Football ===
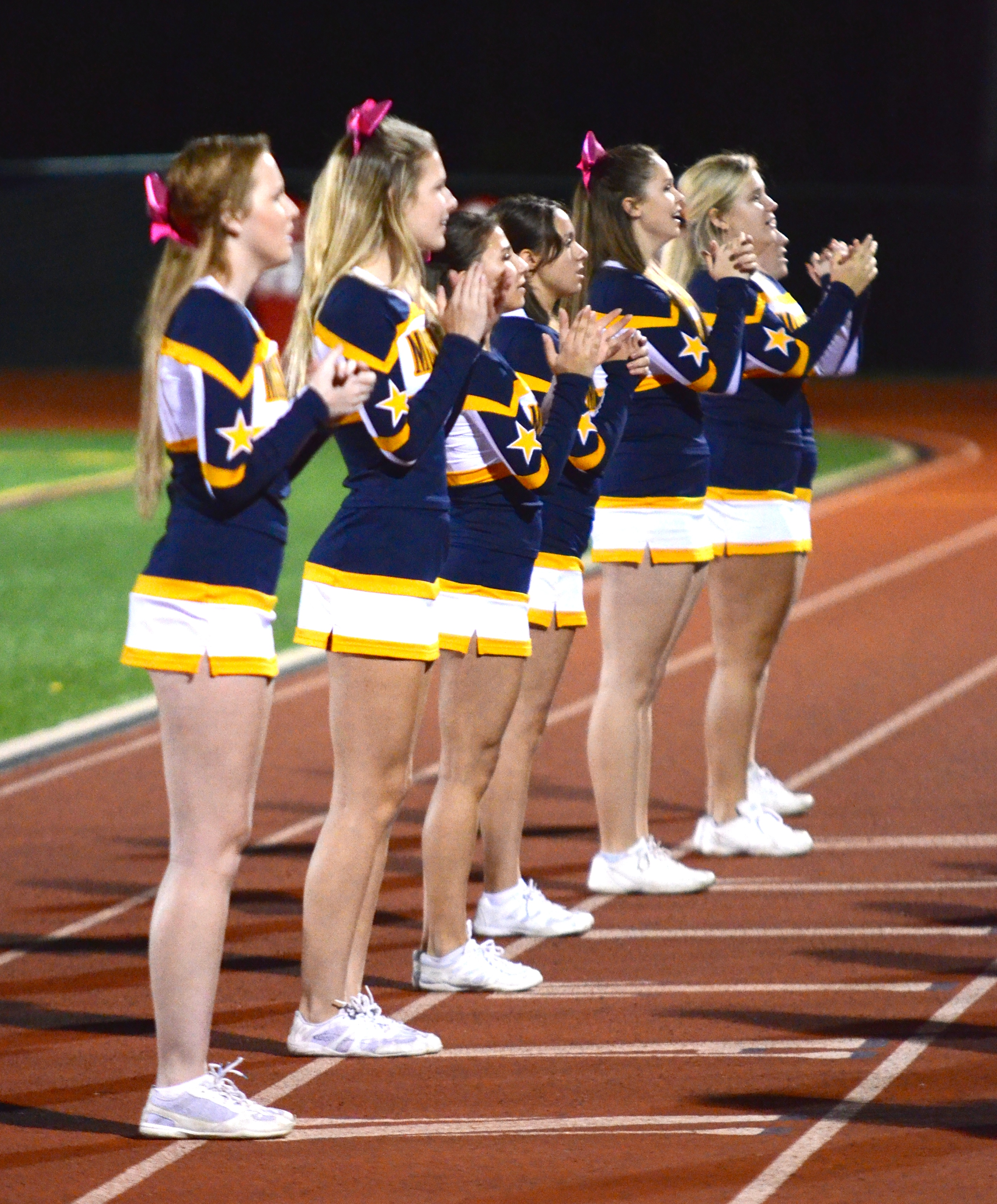
Marian cheerleaders at a home football game, 2014

Marian began a football program in 2007 under head coach Ted Karras Jr. Since then, the Knights have won two NAIA national championships. In 2012, in only their sixth year of play, the Knights won their first NAIA football championship. In 2014, the #7 Marian Knights became the NAIA runner-up after losing to #8 Southern Oregon University 55–31. The next year, the Knights won the NAIA championship, a rematch of the 2014 national championship against the SOU Raiders, 31–14. This marked their third championship game appearance and second victory in four years. The head coach for that victory was Mark Henninger. Several football program alumni have earned contracts at the professional level, such as Krishawn Hogan and Julian Williams.

=== Men's basketball ===
The men's basketball program, established for the 1954–55 season, is the oldest intercollegiate athletic team at Marian.

=== Women's basketball ===
On March 24, 2026, the Marian University women's basketball team won its third NAIA title.

=== Cycling ===
The university is nationally known for its cycling team, which practices and competes at the Indy Cycloplex, home of the Major Taylor Velodrome. The cycling team is a Division I varsity team underneath the collegiate cycling umbrella of USA Cycling.

== See also ==
- The Indiana College Mathematics Competition
- Indianapolis Art Center provides educational programming for Marian University
