= 2012 NAIA football rankings =

One human poll made up the 2012 National Association of Intercollegiate Athletics (NAIA) football rankings, sometimes called the NAIA Coaches' Poll or the football ratings. Once the regular season was complete, the NAIA sponsored a playoff to determine the year's national champion. A final poll was then taken after completion of the 2012 NAIA Football National Championship.

== Poll release dates ==
The poll release dates were:

2012 poll release dates
Spring	April 18
Preseason	August 6
Week 1	September 10
Week 2	September 17
Week 3	September 24
Week 4	October 1
Week 5	October 8
Week 6	October 15
Week 7	October 22
Week 8	October 29
Week 9	November 5
Week 10 (Final Regular Season)	November 11
Postseason	December 18

== Week by week poll ==
	Week 0-Spring Apr 18	Week 0-Preseason Aug 06	Week Poll 1 Sep 10	Week Poll 2 Sep 17	Week Poll 3 Sep 24	Week Poll 4 Oct 01	Week Poll 5 Oct 08	Week Poll 6 Oct 15	Week Poll 7 Oct 22	Week Poll 8 Oct 29	Week Poll 9 Nov 05	Week Final Nov 11	Week Postseason Dec 18	
1.	Saint Xavier (IL) (15)	Saint Xavier (IL) (11)	Saint Xavier (IL) (14)	Saint Xavier (IL) (14)	Saint Xavier (IL) (14)	Marian (IN) (11)	Marian (IN) (12)	Marian (IN) (13)	Marian (IN) (13)	Marian (IN) (13)	Georgetown (KY) (13)	Georgetown (KY) (13)	Marian (IN) (14)	1.
2.	Carroll (MT)	Carroll (MT)	Marian (IN)	Marian (IN)	Marian (IN)	Georgetown (KY) (3)	Georgetown (KY) (2)	Georgetown (KY) (1)	Georgetown (KY) (1)	Georgetown (KY) (1)	Missouri Valley (1)	Missouri Valley (1)	Morningside (IA)	2.
3.	Marian (IN)	Marian (IN)	Georgetown (KY)	Georgetown (KY)	Georgetown (KY)	Missouri Valley	Missouri Valley	Missouri Valley	Missouri Valley	Missouri Valley	Morningside (IA)	Morningside (IA)	Missouri Valley	3.
4.	Georgetown (KY)	Georgetown (KY)	Morningside (IA)	Morningside (IA)	Morningside (IA)	Morningside (IA)	Morningside (IA)	Morningside (IA)	Morningside (IA)	Morningside (IA)	Saint Xavier (IL)	Saint Xavier (IL)	Saint Xavier (IL)	4.
5.	MidAmerica Nazarene (KS)	MidAmerica Nazarene (KS)	Missouri Valley	Missouri Valley	Missouri Valley	William Penn (IA)	William Penn (IA)	William Penn (IA)	Saint Xavier (IL)	Saint Xavier (IL)	Marian (IN)	Marian (IN)	Southern Oregon	5.
6.	Saint Francis (IN)	Saint Francis (IN)	Benedictine (KS)	Benedictine (KS)	Benedictine (KS)	Saint Xavier (IL)	Saint Xavier (IL)	Saint Xavier (IL)	Carroll (MT)	Saint Francis (IN)	Saint Francis (IN)	Saint Francis (IN)	Saint Francis (IN)	6.
7.	St. Francis (IL)	St. Francis (IL)	William Penn (IA)	William Penn (IA)	William Penn (IA)	Saint Francis (IN)	Saint Francis (IN)	Carroll (MT)	Saint Francis (IN)	Montana Tech	Montana Tech	Cumberlands (KY)	Cumberlands (KY)	7.
8.	Morningside (IA)	Morningside (IA)	Eastern Oregon	Eastern Oregon	Carroll (MT)	Carroll (MT)	Carroll (MT)	Montana Tech	Montana Tech	Cumberlands (KY)	Cumberlands (KY)	St. Ambrose (IA)	Georgetown (KY)	8.
9.	Missouri Valley	Missouri Valley	(T) St. Ambrose (IA)	Baker (KS)	St. Ambrose (IA)	Cumberlands (KY)	Cumberlands (KY)	Saint Francis (IN)	Grand View (IA)	Grand View (IA)	Grand View (IA)	MidAmerica Nazarene (KS)	Bethel (TN)	9.
10.	Ottawa (KS)	Northwestern (IA)	(T) Baker (KS)	St. Ambrose (IA)	Saint Francis (IN)	MidAmerica Nazarene (KS)	MidAmerica Nazarene (KS)	Grand View (IA)	Cumberlands (KY)	William Penn (IA)	St. Ambrose (IA)	Southern Oregon	St. Ambrose (IA)	10.
11.	Benedictine (KS)	(T) Ottawa (KS)	Saint Francis (IN)	Carroll (MT)	MidAmerica Nazarene (KS)	Northwestern (IA)	Northwestern (IA)	Cumberlands (KY)	William Penn (IA)	St. Ambrose (IA)	MidAmerica Nazarene (KS)	Baker (KS)	MidAmerica Nazarene (KS)	11.
12.	Bethel (TN)	(T) Bethel (TN)	Carroll (MT)	Saint Francis (IN)	Cumberlands (KY)	Benedictine (KS)	Benedictine (KS)	St. Ambrose (IA)	St. Ambrose (IA)	MidAmerica Nazarene (KS)	(T) Baker (KS)	Northwestern (IA)	(T) Northwestern (IA)	12.
13.	William Penn (IA)	Benedictine (KS)	MidAmerica Nazarene (KS)	MidAmerica Nazarene (KS)	Baker (KS)	Montana Tech	Montana Tech	MidAmerica Nazarene (KS)	MidAmerica Nazarene (KS)	Baker (KS)	(T) Southern Oregon	William Penn (IA)	(T) Montana Tech	13.
14.	Northwestern (IA)	William Penn (IA)	Cumberlands (KY)	Cumberlands (KY)	Eastern Oregon	Grand View (IA)	Grand View (IA)	Hastings (NE)	Baker (KS)	Southern Oregon	Northwestern (IA)	Montana Tech	Baker (KS)	14.
15.	Valley City State (ND)	Grand View (IA)	Grand View (IA)	Grand View (IA)	Northwestern (IA)	St. Francis (IL)	St. Ambrose (IA)	Baker (KS)	Evangel (MO)	Evangel (MO)	William Penn (IA)	Ottawa (KS)	William Penn (IA)	15.
16.	Grand View (IA)	Eastern Oregon	Doane (NE)	Northwestern (IA)	Montana Tech	St. Ambrose (IA)	Cumberland (TN)	Benedictine (KS)	Northwestern (IA)	Carroll (MT)	Ottawa (KS)	Grand View (IA)	Ottawa (KS)	16.
17.	Eastern Oregon	Valley City State (ND)	(T) St. Francis (IL)	Montana Tech	St. Francis (IL)	Cumberland (TN)	Hastings (NE)	Evangel (MO)	St. Francis (IL)	Northwestern (IA)	Tabor (KS)	Tabor (KS)	Grand View (IA)	17.
18.	Doane (NE)	Baker (KS)	(T) Northwestern (IA)	St. Francis (IL)	Grand View (IA)	Doane (NE)	Baker (KS)	Northwestern (IA)	Hastings (NE)	Benedictine (KS)	Bethel (TN)	Bethel (TN)	Tabor (KS)	18.
19.	Baker (KS)	Cumberlands (KY)	Rocky Mountain (MT)	Dakota Wesleyan (SD)	Cumberland (TN)	Baker (KS)	Dakota Wesleyan (SD)	St. Francis (IL)	Southern Oregon	Ottawa (KS)	Evangel (MO)	Doane (NE)	Cumberland (TN)	19.
20.	St. Ambrose (IA)	St. Ambrose (IA)	Montana Tech	Valley City State (ND)	Doane (NE)	Kansas Wesleyan	St. Francis (IL)	Doane (NE)	Cumberland (TN)	Tabor (KS)	Doane (NE)	Cumberland (TN)	Doane (NE)	20.
21.	Langston (OK)	Doane (NE)	Valley City State (ND)	Cumberland (TN)	Valley City State (ND)	Hastings (NE)	Evangel (MO)	Faulkner (AL)	Benedictine (KS)	Bethel (TN)	Cumberland (TN)	Carroll (MT)	Carroll (MT)	21.
22.	Cumberlands (KY)	(T) Cumberland (TN)	Dakota Wesleyan (SD)	Rocky Mountain (MT)	Dakota Wesleyan (SD)	Menlo (CA)	Doane (NE)	Tabor (KS)	(T) Tabor (KS)	Robert Morris (IL)	Carroll (MT)	Benedictine (KS)	Benedictine (KS)	22.
23.	Cumberland (TN)	(T) Langston (OK)	Taylor (IN)	Doane (NE)	Kansas Wesleyan	Faulkner (AL)	Robert Morris (IL)	Southern Oregon	(T) Robert Morris (IL)	Kansas Wesleyan	Bacone (OK)	Evangel (MO)	Evangel (MO)	23.
24.	Bethany (KS)	Bethany (KS)	Lindsey Wilson (KY)	Kansas Wesleyan	Menlo (CA)	Eastern Oregon	Tabor (KS)	Robert Morris (IL)	Ottawa (KS)	Doane (NE)	St. Francis (IL)	Valley City State (ND)	Valley City State (ND)	24.
25.	Lindsey Wilson (KY)	Campbellsville (KY)	Cumberland (TN)	Menlo (CA)	Faulkner (AL)	Dakota Wesleyan	Friends (KS)	Cumberland (TN)	Dakota Wesleyan (SD)	Hastings (NE)	Benedictine (KS)	Kentucky Christian	Kentucky Christian	25.
	Week 0-Spring Apr 18	Week 0-Preseason Aug 06	Week Poll 1 Sep 10	Week Poll 2 Sep 17	Week Poll 3 Sep 24	Week Poll 4 Oct 01	Week Poll 5 Oct 08	Week Poll 6 Oct 15	Week Poll 7 Oct 22	Week Poll 8 Oct 29	Week Poll 9 Nov 05	Week Final Nov 11	Week Postseason Dec 18	
		Dropped: Lindsey Wilson (KY)	Dropped: Ottawa (KS); Bethel (TN); Langston (OK); Bethany (KS); Campbellsville (KY)	Dropped: Taylor (IN); Lindsey Wilson (KY)	Dropped: Rocky Mountain (MT)	Dropped: Valley City State (ND)	Dropped: Kansas Wesleyan; Menlo (CA); Faulkner (AL); Eastern Oregon	Dropped: Dakota Wesleyan (SD); Friends (KS)	Dropped: Doane (NE); Faulkner (AL)	Dropped: St. Francis (IL); Cumberland (TN); Dakota Wesleyan (SD)	Dropped: Robert Morris (IL); Kansas Wesleyan; Hastings (NE)	Dropped: Bacone (OK); St. Francis (IL)	None	

Legend
	No change in ranking
	Increase in ranking
	Decrease in ranking
	Not ranked previous week
	NAIA National Champion
(т)	Tied with team above or below also with this symbol

== Leading Vote-Getters ==
Since the inception of the Coaches' Poll in 1999, the #1 ranking in the various weekly polls has been held by only a select group of teams. Through the end of 2012, the team and the number of times they have held the #1 weekly ranking are shown below. The number of times a team has been ranked #1 in the postseason poll (the national champion) is shown in parentheses.

In 1999, the results of a postseason poll, if one was conducted, are not known. Therefore, an additional poll was presumed, and the #1 postseason ranking has been credited to the postseason tournament champion, the Northwestern Oklahoma State Rangers.

Team	Total #1 Rankings
Carroll (MT)	56 (6)
Sioux Falls (SD)	55 (3)
Georgetown (KY)	25 (2)
Saint Xavier (IL)	14 (1)
Northwestern Oklahoma State	12 (1)
Marian (IN)	8 (1)
Azusa Pacific (CA)	3
Saint Francis (IN)	3
