= Siena Heights University =

Catholic university in Adrian, Michigan, US

Coordinates: 41°54′20.4″N 84°00′56.5″W

- Seal of Siena Heights University
- Former names: St. Joseph's College (1919–1939); Siena Heights College (1939–1998)
- Motto: Competent, Purposeful, and Ethical
- Type: Private university
- Active: 1919–2026
- Affiliations: ACCU; NAICU
- Religious affiliation: Roman Catholic (Adrian Dominican Sisters)
- Location: Adrian, Michigan, United States
- Campus: Rural
- Colors: Blue & Yellow
- Nickname: Saints
- Sporting affiliations: NAIA – WHAC
- Mascot: Halo the Husky Dog
- Website: www.sienaheights.edu

Siena Heights University (SHU) was a private Catholic university in Adrian, Michigan, United States. It was founded by the Adrian Dominican Sisters in 1919. The university closed at the end of the 2025–2026 academic year.

== History ==
The institution was founded for women in 1919 as St. Joseph's College by the Adrian Dominican Sisters. In 1939, it was renamed as Siena Heights College, after Saint Catherine of Siena.

In 1969, it became coeducational. In 1998, after expansion of graduate studies, it was renamed Siena Heights University. The sisters minister in 29 states, the District of Columbia, and the Commonwealth of Puerto Rico, and in seven countries outside the United States.

The college seal used the Dominican Shield of the International Order of Preachers, consisting of four white and four black gyrons or triangles. These symbolize the unity of a body of people working together for the common good. The "cross fleury" (or cross with fleurs de lis at each end) superimposed on the gyrons, signifies victory, duty and self-sacrifice. The sable (or black of the shield) symbolizes wisdom, silence, fortitude and penance. The light color signifies peace, purity, charity and sincerity. The motto surrounding the shield, "Laudare, Benedicere, Praedicare," means "to praise God, to bless His people and to preach His gospel". The shield may also be surrounded by the six- or eight-pointed star that is the distinguishing symbol of St. Dominic.

Siena Heights was affiliated with and sponsored by the Dominican Sisters of Adrian, Michigan. It was accredited by the Higher Learning Commission.

Leaders of the university announced on June 30, 2025, that Siena Heights University will close at the end of the 2025–26 school year. In their announcement, they cited "the financial situation, operational challenges, and long-term sustainability" as the reasons for the planned closure despite having the largest incoming class in the university's history—445 students—in 2024.

== Campuses ==
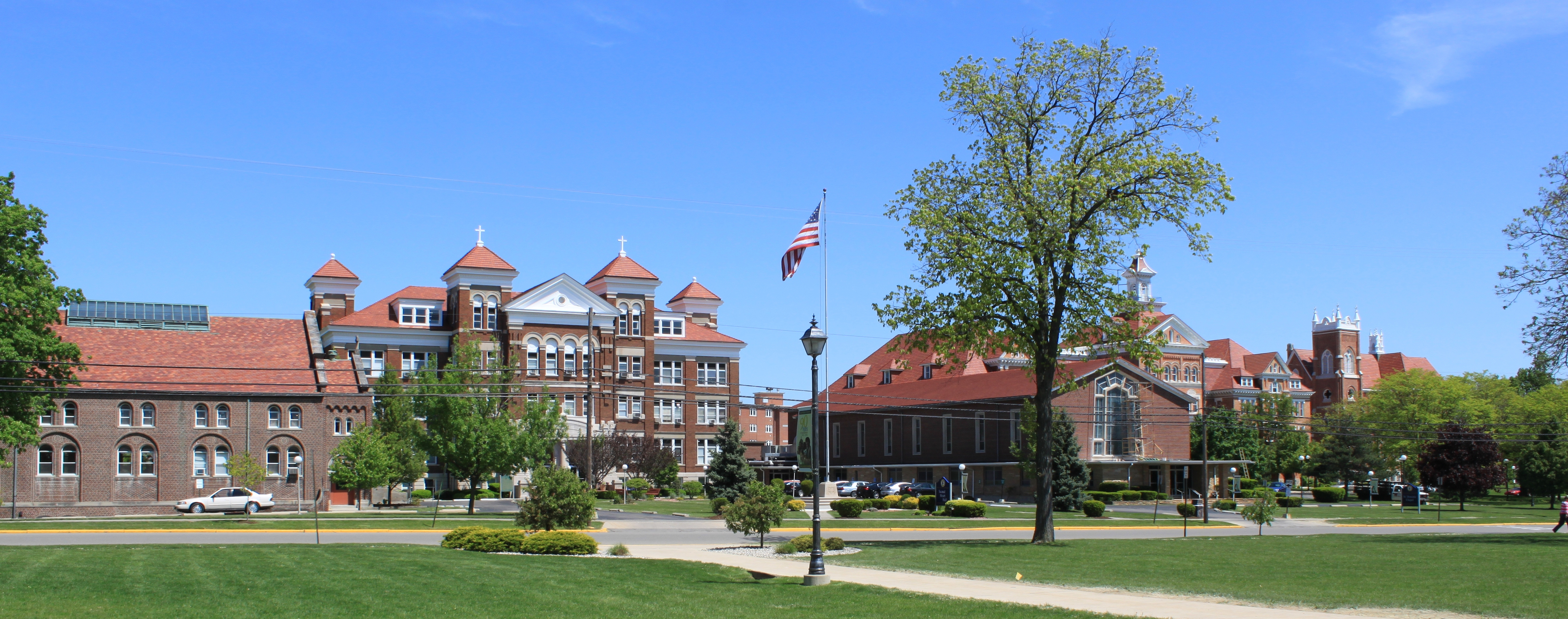
Siena Heights University campus

The main campus had 55 acres (22 ha) with 17 buildings in Adrian, Michigan and the distinction of being the first all wireless college or university in the state of Michigan. There were satellite campuses in Dearborn, Benton Harbor, Monroe, Battle Creek, Kalamazoo, Lansing, Jackson, and online.

A piece of the main campus property extended into Adrian Charter Township.

== Academics ==
The university had more than 40 academic programs of study. between the College of Arts and Sciences, the College for Professional Studies, and the Graduate College. Its most popular undergraduate majors, in terms of 2021 graduates, were:

- Business Administration & Management (95)
- Criminal Justice/Safety Studies (46)
- Registered Nursing/Registered Nurse (38)
- Community Organization & Advocacy (36)
- Accounting (34)
- Health Services/Allied Health/Health Sciences (30)
- Radiologic Technology/Science – Radiographer (30)

Siena Heights also provided classes for high school students through dual enrollment. This gave juniors and seniors who met certain criteria to get college credit and experience while still in high school, getting students a step closer to going to college and learning about college life and class work. The student-to-faculty ratio was 12:1.

== Athletics ==
The Siena Heights athletic teams were called the Saints. The university was a member of the National Association of Intercollegiate Athletics (NAIA), primarily competing in the Wolverine–Hoosier Athletic Conference (WHAC) for most of its sports since the 1992–93 academic year, while its football team competed in the Mideast League of the Mid-States Football Association (MSFA) since the 2012 fall season. Prior to the addition of women's lacrosse by the WHAC, the women's lacrosse team competed in the National Women's Lacrosse League (NWLL).

Siena Heights competed in 25 intercollegiate varsity sports. Men's sports included baseball, basketball, bowling, cross country, football, golf, lacrosse, soccer, track & field, volleyball and wrestling; women's sports included basketball, bowling, cross country, golf, flag football, lacrosse, soccer, stunt, softball, track & field, volleyball and wrestling; and co-ed sports include cheerleading, dance and eSports.

== Notable alumni ==
- Tom Cochran, member of the Michigan House of Representatives (2013–2019)
- Darrell Issa, member of the U.S. House of Representatives representing California's 48th congressional district
- Leslie Love, member of the Michigan House of Representatives (2014–2020)
- Miriam Michael Stimson, Dominican nun and chemist
- Paula Mary Turnbull, welding nun
