= Saint Xavier University =

Catholic college in Chicago, Illinois, US

Coordinates: 41°42′31″N 87°42′53″W

- Former names: Saint Francis Xavier Female Academy (1846–1873); Saint Xavier Academy (1873–1915); Saint Francis Xavier College for Women (1915–1919); Saint Xavier College (1919–1992)
- Motto: Via Veritas Vita (Latin)
- Motto in English: (I am) the way, the truth, and the life.
- Type: Private university
- Established: 1846; 180 years ago
- Founders: Religious Sisters of Mercy
- Affiliations: NAICU; CIC
- Religious affiliation: Roman Catholic (Sisters of Mercy)
- Academic affiliations: ACCU CMHE CIC NAICU
- President: Keith Elder
- Provost: Caress Dean
- Students: 3,286 (fall 2025)
- Undergraduates: 2,893 (fall 2025)
- Postgraduates: 393 (fall 2025)
- Location: Chicago, Illinois, United States
- Campus: 109 acres (44 ha); Urban
- Colors: Scarlet & Gray
- Nickname: Cougars
- Sporting affiliations: NAIA – CCAC
- Mascot: Cougar
- Website: www.sxu.edu

Saint Xavier University (or SXU) is a private Catholic university in Chicago, Illinois, United States. Founded in 1846 by the Sisters of Mercy, the university enrolls 3,749 students.

== History ==
Saint Xavier University was founded as a women's college by the Sisters of Mercy in 1846 at the request of William Quarter, Bishop of Chicago. With the City of Chicago less than 10 years old, the religious sisters, under the guidance of Mary Francis Xavier Warde, established Saint Francis Xavier Female Academy. The academy, which would later become Saint Xavier College, and finally Saint Xavier University, was the first Mercy College and is the oldest chartered college in the city of Chicago.

In the year 1846, five sisters of Mercy were sent to the city of Chicago from Pittsburgh to start Catholic work in the new city. The original campus (then referred to as an academy), soon gained, in 1847, a state charter which allowed for the granting of degrees from the academy. After this location on Wabash Avenue between Madison and Monroe in downtown Chicago) burned down in the Great Chicago Fire of 1871, the campus was rebuilt on the southern boundary of Chicago.

In 1915, Saint Francis Xavier College for Women opened.

== Academics ==
Saint Xavier University offers undergraduate majors and graduate programs through its two colleges:

- The College of Liberal Arts and Education
- The College of Nursing, Health Sciences and Business (a recognized Center of Excellence by the National League for Nursing)

Saint Xavier University has one of the most diverse undergraduate student bodies in Chicago and is a federally designated Hispanic-serving institution.

== Campus ==
Saint Xavier's 109 acres (44.1 ha) main campus is located in Chicago in the Mt. Greenwood neighborhood on the corner of 103rd Street and Central Park Avenue. It is in close proximity to the suburb of Evergreen Park, Illinois.

The university's main campus is made up of several buildings, including the Warde Academic Center, which is the oldest building on campus and houses administrative offices and the library; the Shannon Center; McDonough Chapel, a small Catholic chapel; the Graham School of Management Building; Andrew Conference Center and Driehaus Center. Within a mile of the main campus are the Visual Arts Center and O'Grady Center, which houses the departments of University Relations and University Advancement.

In 2001, an influx of students to the university led to the opening of four new dormitories on campus. Residence halls listed below;

- McCarthy Hall (opened 2001)
- Morris Hall (opened 2002)
- O'Brien Hall (opened 2008)
- Pacelli Hall (opened 1959)
- Rubloff Hall (opened 2006)

In 2009, Arthur Rubloff Hall and O'Brien Halls opened. These residence halls are environmentally friendly, featuring rooftop gardens and clean-source alternative energy.

== Athletics ==
The Saint Xavier (SXU) athletic teams are called the Cougars. The university is a member of the National Association of Intercollegiate Athletics (NAIA), primarily competing in the Chicagoland Collegiate Athletic Conference (CCAC) in most of its sports since the 1973–74 academic year; while its football team competes in the Midwest League of the Mid-States Football Association (MSFA).

SXU competes in 20 intercollegiate varsity sports: Men's sports include baseball, basketball, bowling, cross country, esports, football, golf, soccer, track & field and volleyball; women's sports include basketball, bowling, cross country, golf, soccer, softball, track & field and volleyball; and co-ed sports include cheerleading and dance.

=== Facilities ===
Athletic facilities on campus include the Shannon Center, which holds up to 3,500 students and houses the university fitness center. It is home to both men's and women's basketball and volleyball teams. Bruce R. Deaton Memorial Field is home to football, soccer, and track.

The Saint Xavier University baseball team hosts all its home baseball games at Richard R. Ferrell Memorial Field located on its Chicago campus. The field recently updated its backstop and dugouts with brick and added additional bleachers for spectators; along with full turf field. The dimensions for the field are 330 feet on the lines, 375 feet in the gaps and 400 feet to centerfield.

=== Accomplishments ===
In 2011, Saint Xavier won the NAIA Football National Championship.
