= 2025 NAIA football season =

American college football season

- Total No. of teams: 94
- Regular season: August 28 – November 15, 2025
- Postseason: November 22 – December 20, 2025
- National Championship: Crowley ISD Multi-Purpose Stadium; Fort Worth, TX; December 20, 2025
- Champion: Grand View
- Player of the Year: Jackson Waring, QB, Grand View

The 2025 NAIA football season is the component of the 2025 college football season organized by the National Association of Intercollegiate Athletics (NAIA) in the United States.

The regular season began on August 28 and concluded on November 15.

The playoffs, known as the NAIA Football National Championship, began on November 22 and culminated with the championship game on December 20 at Crowley ISD Multi-Purpose Stadium in Fort Worth, Texas.

== Membership changes ==
- The North Star Athletic Association disbanded prior to the start of the season; the majority of its members subsequently moved to the Frontier Conference.

School	Former conference	New conference	Ref
Concordia (MI) Cardinals	Mid-States	Dropped athletics	
Dakota State Trojans	North Star	Frontier	
Dickinson State Blue Hawks	North Star	Frontier	
Jamestown Jimmies	North Star	NSIC (NCAA D-II)	
Mayville State Comets	North Star	Frontier	
North American Stallions	Sooner	Dropped program	
Rio Grande RedStorm	New program	Appalachian	
St. Andrews Knights	Appalachian	School closed	
Simpson Red Hawks	Independent	Frontier	
Valley City State Vikings	North Star	Frontier	

== Top 10 matchups ==
=== Regular season matchups ===
Date	Visiting team	Home team	Site	Result	Attendance	Ref.
August 30	No. 3 Morningside	No. 4 Benedictine (KS)	Larry Wilcox Stadium • Atchison, Kansas	34–38	0	
August 30	No. 2 Keiser	No. 6 Indiana Wesleyan	Wildcat Football Field • Marion, Indiana	38–31	1,125	
September 7	No. 4 Benedictine (KS)	No. 1 Grand View	Williams Stadium • Des Moines, Iowa	24–27	0	
October 18	No. 8 St. Thomas (FL)	No. 2 Keiser	Keiser Multi-Purpose Field • West Palm Beach, Florida	14–35	1,073	
October 18	No. 7 Lindsey Wilson	No. 9 Campbellsville	Ron Finley Stadium • Campbellsville, Kentucky	31–34	0	
November 15	No. 6 Dordt	No. 9 Morningside	Elwood Olsen Stadium • Sioux City, Iowa	28–34 ^{OT}	0	
^{#}Rankings from NAIA Coaches' poll released prior to the game (Note: Preseason rankings were released on August 25 and the next rankings (week one) were released until September 15.).

=== Postseason matchups ===
Date	Visiting team	Home team	Site	Result	Attendance	Ref.
November 29	No. 10 Indiana Wesleyan	No. 7 Lindsey Wilson	Parnell Family Stadium • Columbia, Kentucky (Second round)	31–57	1,176	
November 29	No. 8 Morningside	No. 9 College of Idaho	Simplot Stadium • Caldwell, Idaho (Second round)	19–37	2,194	
December 6	No. 9 College of Idaho	No. 4 Montana Tech	Alumni Coliseum • Butte, Montana (Quarterfinal)	41–26	2,411	
December 6	No. 7 Lindsey Wilson	No. 1 Grand View	Mediacom Stadium • Des Moines, Iowa (Quarterfinal)	7–35	0	
December 6	No. 3 Benedictine (KS)	No. 5 Friends	Adair–Austin Stadium • Wichita, Kansas (Quarterfinal)	24–18	0	
December 13	No. 3 Benedictine (KS)	No. 1 Grand View	Duke Williams Stadium • Des Moines, Iowa (Semifinal)	10–17	0	
December 13	No. 9 College of Idaho	No. 2 Keiser	Keiser Football Stadium • West Palm Beach, Florida (Semifinal)	27–36	675	
December 20	No. 2 Keiser	No. 1 Grand View	Crowley ISD Stadium • Fort Worth, Texas (National championship)	16–22	0	
^{#}Rankings from NAIA Coaches' poll released on November 16.

== Upsets ==
=== Regular season upsets ===
This section lists unranked teams defeating NAIA Coaches' poll-ranked teams during the season.

Date	Visiting team	Home team	Site	Result	Attendance	Ref.
August 28	No. 10 Texas Wesleyan	Lindsey Wilson	Parnell Family Stadium • Columbia, Kentucky	10–45	1,812	
August 28	UIndy (Note: It is an NCAA D-II team.)	No. 23 Marian (IN)	ASV Field • Indianapolis, Indiana (Monumental Matchup)	45–21	2,729	
September 6	No. 22 Southern Oregon	Western Oregon	McArthur Field • Monmouth, Oregon	7–27	1,245	
September 8	No. 16 Baker (KS)	Peru State	Oak Bowl • Peru, Nebraska	17–31	0	
September 13	No. 8 St. Thomas (FL)	Lindsey Wilson	Parnell Family Stadium • Columbia, Kentucky	24–52	1,391	
September 13	No. 7 Northwestern (IA)	Mount Marty	Crane Youngworth Field • Yankton, South Dakota	14–24	1,774	
September 13	Evangel	No. 14 Southwestern (KS)	Jantz Stadium • Winfield, Kansas	35–25	0	
September 13	William Penn	No. 16 Baker (KS)	Liston Stadium • Baldwin City, Kansas	24–13	0	
September 20	No. 19 Texas Wesleyan	UT Rio Grande Valley (Note: It is an NCAA D-I FCS team.)	Robert and Janet Vackar Stadium • Edinburg, Texas	13–61	12,447	
September 21	No. 12 MidAmerica Nazarene	William Penn	Statesmen Community Stadium • Oskaloosa, Iowa	31–34	0	
September 22	McPherson	No. 22 Evangel	Eagle Stadium • Springfield, Missouri	17–10	3,023	
October 4	Florida Memorial	No. 10 Southeastern	Victory Field • Lakeland, Florida	28–23	1,752	
October 4	Hastings	No. 22 Northwestern (IA)	De Valois Stadium • Orange City, Iowa	10–9	2,200	
October 11	Midland	No. 17 Concordia (NE)	Bulldog Stadium • Seward, Nebraska	60–52	1,500	
October 18	No. 4 Morningside	Northwestern (IA)	De Valois Stadium • Orange City, Iowa	13–14	1,088	
October 18	No. 19 Texas Wesleyan	Mary Hardin–Baylor (Note: It is an NCAA D-III team.)	Crusader Stadium • Belton, Texas	19–28	3,524	
October 18	No. 22 MidAmerica Nazarene	Baker (KS)	Liston Stadium • Baldwin City, Kansas	14–34	0	
October 25	No. 6 Campbellsville	Cumberland	Nokes–Lasater Field • Lebanon, Tennessee	33–35	4,551	
October 25	No. T–25 Bethel (TN)	Cumberlands	James H. Taylor II Stadium • Williamsburg, Kentucky	10–34	0	
November 1	No. 16 Georgetown (KY)	Bethel (TN)	Walter Butler Stadium • McKenzie, Tennessee	23–26	575	
November 1	No. 22 Olivet Nazarene	St. Francis (IN)	Bishop John M. D'Arcy Stadium • Fort Wayne, Indiana	22–30	488	
November 9	No. 18 McPherson	Kansas Wesleyan	Gene Bissell Field • Salina, Kansas	17–20	0	
November 15	Louisiana Christian	No. T–11 OUAZ	Spirit Field • Surprise, Arizona	48–13	0	
November 15	No. 19 Northwestern (IA)	Concordia (NE)	Bulldog Stadium • Seward, Nebraska	17–21	1,200	
^{#}Rankings from NAIA Coaches' poll released prior to the game (Note: Preseason rankings were released on August 25 and the next rankings (week one) were released until September 15.).

=== Postseason upsets ===
This section lists lower seeded teams defeating higher seeded teams during the playoffs. Seed rankings appears in parentheses.

Date	Visiting team	Home team	Site	Result	Attendance	Ref.
December 6	No. 9 (8) College of Idaho	No. 4 (3) Montana Tech	Alumni Coliseum • Butte, Montana (Quarterfinal)	41–26	2,411	
December 6	No. 3 (5) Benedictine (KS)	No. 5 (4) Friends	Adair–Austin Stadium • Wichita, Kansas (Quarterfinal)	24–18	0	
^{#}Rankings from NAIA Coaches' poll released on November 16.

== Conference standings ==
2025 Appalachian Athletic Conference football standings
	Conf.			Overall
Team	W		L	W		L
No. 23 Reinhardt $^	6	–	0	7	–	4
Pikeville	4	–	2	4	–	6
Point	4	–	2	4	–	6
Bluefield	3	–	3	4	–	6
Kentucky Christian	2	–	4	4	–	6
Union Commonwealth	2	–	4	3	–	6
Rio Grande	0	–	6	0	–	9
$ – Conference champion; ^ – NAIA playoff participant; Rankings from NAIA Coaches' Poll

2025 Frontier Conference football standings
	Conf.			Overall
Team	W		L	W		L
East Division
No. 5 Montana Tech x^	6	–	0	12	–	1
No. 25 Dakota State	5	–	1	8	–	2
Rocky Mountain	4	–	2	4	–	6
Valley City State	3	–	3	6	–	4
Mayville State	2	–	4	5	–	6
Dickinson State	1	–	5	3	–	7
Montana State–Northern	0	–	6	1	–	10
West Division
No. 4 College of Idaho x^	6	–	0	11	–	2
No. 13 Carroll (MT) ^	5	–	1	9	–	3
No. 18 Montana Western	4	–	2	7	–	3
Eastern Oregon	3	–	3	4	–	6
Southern Oregon	2	–	4	3	–	7
Arizona Christian	1	–	5	2	–	8
Simpson (CA)	0	–	6	0	–	10
x – Division champion/co-champions; ^ – NAIA playoff participant; Rankings from NAIA Coaches' Poll

2025 Great Plains Athletic Conference football standings
	Conf.			Overall
Team	W		L	W		L
No. 9 Dordt +^	9	–	1	10	–	1
No. 8 Morningside +^	9	–	1	9	–	3
Concordia (NE)	7	–	3	7	–	3
Northwestern (IA)	6	–	4	6	–	4
Midland	6	–	4	6	–	5
Briar Cliff	5	–	5	6	–	5
Hastings	5	–	5	5	–	5
Mount Marty	3	–	7	4	–	7
Dakota Wesleyan	3	–	7	4	–	7
Doane	2	–	8	2	–	8
Waldorf	0	–	10	0	–	10
+ – Conference co-champions; ^ – NAIA playoff participant Marian (IN) forfeited its NAIA playoff victory over Dordt.; Rankings from NAIA Coaches' Poll

2025 Heart of America Athletic Conference football standings
	Conf.			Overall
Team	W		L	W		L
North
No. 1 Grand View x^	6	–	0	14	–	0
No. 12 William Penn ^	5	–	1	11	–	2
Peru State	3	–	3	6	–	5
St. Ambrose	3	–	3	4	–	7
Culver–Stockton	2	–	4	5	–	6
Graceland	1	–	5	3	–	7
Clarke	1	–	5	2	–	9
South
No. 3 Benedictine (KS) x^	6	–	0	12	–	2
Baker	5	–	1	6	–	4
MidAmerica Nazarene	4	–	2	7	–	4
Missouri Baptist	3	–	3	4	–	6
Central Methodist	2	–	4	3	–	8
William Woods	1	–	5	1	–	10
Missouri Valley	0	–	6	3	–	7
x – Division champion/co-champions; ^ – NAIA playoff participant; Rankings from NAIA Coaches' Poll

2025 Kansas Collegiate Athletic Conference football standings
	Conf.			Overall
Team	W		L	W		L
Bissell Division
No. 6 Friends x^	5	–	0	12	–	1
No. 22 McPherson	3	–	2	9	–	2
No. 21 Southwestern (KS)	3	–	2	8	–	3
Kansas Wesleyan	3	–	2	7	–	4
Saint Mary (KS)	1	–	4	3	–	8
Sterling	0	–	5	1	–	10
Kessinger Division
No. 19 Evangel x^	5	–	0	9	–	3
Ottawa (KS)	4	–	1	6	–	5
Tabor	3	–	2	5	–	6
Bethel (KS)	1	–	4	3	–	8
Bethany (KS)	1	–	4	3	–	8
Avila	1	–	4	1	–	10
x – Division champion/co-champions; ^ – NAIA playoff participant; Rankings from NAIA Coaches' Poll

2025 Mid-South Conference football standings
	Conf.			Overall
Team	W		L	W		L
No. 7 Lindsey Wilson $^	5	–	1	10	–	2
No. 11 Campbellsville ^	4	–	2	8	–	3
No. 20 Georgetown (KY)	4	–	2	7	–	3
Cumberland (TN)	3	–	3	7	–	4
Bethel (TN)	3	–	3	4	–	5
Faulkner	1	–	5	4	–	6
Cumberlands (KY)	1	–	5	4	–	6
$ – Conference champion; ^ – NAIA playoff participant; Rankings from NAIA Coaches' Poll

2025 Mid-States Football Association standings
	Conf.			Overall
Team	W		L	W		L
Mideast League
No. 10 Indiana Wesleyan x^	5	–	0	9	–	3
Taylor	4	–	1	7	–	4
Siena Heights	3	–	2	5	–	5
Defiance	2	–	3	4	–	7
Lawrence Tech	1	–	4	2	–	8
Madonna	0	–	5	1	–	10
Midwest League
No. 16 Saint Francis (IN) x^	4	–	1	10	–	3
Saint Xavier x	4	–	1	8	–	3
No. 15 Marian (IN) ^	3	–	2	8	–	4
Olivet Nazarene	2	–	3	6	–	4
St. Francis (IL)	1	–	4	3	–	7
Judson	1	–	4	1	–	10
x – League champion/co-champions ^ – NAIA playoff participant Marian compiled an overall record of 10–1 in the regular season with a mark of 5–0 in conference play, winning the Mid-States Football Association's Midwest League title. The Knights advanced to the NAIA playoffs, where, after a first round bye, they defeated Dordt. However, Marian was removed from the NAIA playoffs prior to the team's quarterfinal game against Keiser due to self-reported player eligibility violation. The Vikings forfeited conference wins over Judson and Saint Xavier and the playoff victory over Dordt.; Rankings from NAIA Coaches' Poll

2025 Sooner Athletic Conference football standings
	Conf.			Overall
Team	W		L	W		L
OUAZ +	7	–	1	8	–	1
Louisiana Christian +	7	–	1	8	–	3
No. 24 Texas Wesleyan +^	7	–	1	7	–	5
Wayland Baptist	5	–	3	6	–	3
Langston	3	–	5	3	–	7
Nelson	3	–	5	3	–	7
OK Panhandle State	2	–	6	3	–	7
Arkansas Baptist	1	–	7	2	–	8
Texas College	1	–	7	1	–	8
+ – Conference co-champions; ^ – NAIA playoff participant; Rankings from NAIA Coaches' Poll

2025 Sun Conference football standings
	Conf.			Overall
Team	W		L	W		L
No. 2 Keiser $^	7	–	0	12	–	1
No. 14 Southeastern ^	5	–	2	9	–	3
No. 17 St. Thomas (FL) ^	5	–	2	7	–	4
Florida Memorial	4	–	3	4	–	6
Webber International	3	–	4	5	–	6
Ave Maria	2	–	5	3	–	7
Warner	2	–	5	2	–	8
Thomas	0	–	7	0	–	11
$ – Conference champion; ^ – NAIA playoff participant; Rankings from NAIA Coaches' Poll

== Postseason ==
=== Teams ===
==== Automatic bids (13) ====
Automatic bids
Conference		School	Record	Appearance	Last
Appalachian		Reinhardt	7–3	10th	2023
Frontier	East Division	Montana Tech	11–0	12th	2024
Frontier	West Division	College of Idaho	9–1	3rd	2023
Great Plains		Morningside	9–2	22nd	2024
Heart of America	North Division	Grand View	10–0	14th	2024
Heart of America	South Division	Benedictine (KS)	10–1	17th	2024
KCAC	Bissell Division	Friends	11–0	6th	2024
KCAC	Kessinger Division	Evangel	9–2	6th	2023
Mid-South		Lindsey Wilson	9–1	9th	2022
Mid-States	Mideast League	Indiana Wesleyan	9–2	5th	2024
Mid-States	Midwest League	Marian (IN)	10–1	13th	2023
Sooner		Texas Wesleyan	7–4	2nd	2024
Sun		Keiser	10–0	7th	2024

==== At-large bids (7) ====
At-large bids
School	Conference	Record	Appearance	Last
Dordt	Great Plains	9–1	3rd	2023
Campbellsville	Mid-South	8–2	5th	2015
William Penn	Heart of America	10–1	10th	2012
Carroll (MT)	Frontier	8–2	25th	2022
Southeasetern	Sun	8–2	3rd	2017
Saint Francis (IN)	Mid-States	9–2	21st	2024
St. Thomas (FL)	Sun	7–3	3rd	2024

=== Bracket ===
First Round; November 22; Campus sites
16	Saint Francis (IN)	13
18	Evangel	12
13	William Penn	38
20	Texas Wesleyan	9
14	Carroll (MT)	42
17	St. Thomas (FL)	35
15	Southeastern	24
19	Reinhardt	22

Second Round; November 29; Campus sites
7	Lindsey Wilson	57
11	Indiana Wesleyan	31
1	Grand View	62
16	Saint Francis (IN)	20
5	Benedictine (KS)	21
12	Campbellsville	17
4	Friends	53
13	William Penn	36
8	College of Idaho	37
9	Morningside	19
3	Montana Tech	31
14	Carroll (MT)	21
6	Marian (IN)	26
10	Dordt	18
2	Keiser	44
15	Southeastern	16

Quarterfinals; December 6 Campus sites
7	Lindsey Wilson	7
1	Grand View	35
5	Benedictine (KS)	24
4	Friends	18
8	College of Idaho	41
3	Montana Tech	26
6	Marian (IN)	*
2	Keiser	w/o

Semifinals; December 13; Campus sites
1	Grand View	17
5	Benedictine (KS)	10
8	College of Idaho	27
2	Keiser	36

Championship; December 20; Crowley ISD Multi-Purpose Stadium; Fort Worth, Texas
1	Grand View	22
2	Keiser	16

*– Marian was removed from the NAIA playoffs prior to the team's quarterfinal game against Keiser due to a self-reported player eligibility violation.

== Coaching changes ==
=== Preseason and in-season ===
This is restricted to coaching changes that took place on or after May 1, 2025, and will include any changes announced after a team's last regularly scheduled games but before its playoff games.

School	Outgoing coach	Date	Reason	Replacement	Previous position
Thomas	Orlando Mitjans	Before May 13, 2025	Resigned	Vincent Davis	Webber International assistant head coach and defensive line coach (2022–2024)
Judson	Quintin Demps	Before May 19, 2025	Hired as defensive pass came coordinator and safeties coach for Central State (OH)	Shawn Flynn	Colorado Springs Christian HS (CO) associate head coach and quarterbacks coach (2024)
Graceland	Patrick Ross	July 31, 2025	Resigned (named as team's general manager)	Phil Staback	Graceland offensive coordinator (2024)

=== End of season ===
This list includes coaching changes announced during the season that did not take effect until the end of the season.

School	Outgoing coach	Date	Reason	Replacement	Previous position
Peru State	Phil Ockinga	November 17, 2025	Contract not renewed	Sean Wilkerson	Peru State defensive coordinator (2022–2025)
Langston	Quinton Morgan	November 18, 2025	Fired	Calvin Miller (interim)	Langston defensive coordinator and defensive line coach (2017–2025)
Waldorf	Tyler Chapa	November 20, 2025	Resigned	David Calloway	Missouri Valley associate head coach and defensive coordinator (2025)
Eastern Oregon	Tim Camp	November 21, 2025	Resigned	Solo Taylor	Eastern Oregon defensive coordinator and defensive backs coach (2024–2025)
Southeastern	Adam Waugh	December 2, 2025	Resigned	Jake Russell	Campbellsville head coach (2023–2025)
Arizona Christian	Jeff Bowen	December 3, 2025	Resigned	Drew Maddox	John Melvin (FL) head coach (2025)
Rocky Mountain	Chris Stutzriem	December 12, 2025	Hired as head coach for Bismarck State	Randy Bandelow	Carroll (MT) defensive coordinator (2022–2025)
Avila	Derrick Alexander	Before December 15, 2025	Resigned	Ed Warinner	St. Thomas (FL) tight ends coach (2024–2025)
St. Thomas (FL)	Bill Rychel	December 17, 2025	Resigned (became school's athletic director)	Drew Davis	St. Thomas (FL) quarterbacks coach (2024–2025)
Missouri Baptist	Jason Burianek	Before December 19, 2025	Resigned	Marc Lillibridge	Missouri Baptist linebackers coach (2025)
Simpson (CA)	Shawn Daniel	December 19, 2025	Resigned	Trevor Utter	Simpson (CA) wide receivers coach and tight ends coach (2025)
Saint Mary (KS)	Lance Hinson	Before December 30, 2025	Resigned	Taylor Calvert	Saint Mary (KS) offensive coordinator (2021–2025)
Rio Grande	Mark Thurston	December 2025	Fired	Mike Bartrum	Marshall senior analyst/special assistant (2021–2025)
Campbellsville	Jake Russell	January 8, 2026	Hired as head coach for Southeastern	Hunter Brown	Campbellsville wide receivers coach (2024–2025)
Texas Wesleyan	Brad Sherrod	February 18, 2026	Hired as head coach for Morehouse	Fran Johnson	Texas Wesleyan offensive coordinator (2021–2025)
Briar Cliff	Shane LaDage	March 10, 2026	Resigned	Nathan Koziol	Briar Cliff defensive coordinator and associate head coach (2023–2025)
Clarke	Adam Hicks	Before April 9, 2026	Resigned	Heath Zuck	Mount Marty Co-offensive coordinator and offensive line coach (2020–2025)

== See also ==
- 2025 NCAA Division I FBS football season
- 2025 NCAA Division I FCS football season
- 2025 NCAA Division II football season
- 2025 NCAA Division III football season
- 2025 U Sports football season
- 2025 NAIA flag football season
