= 2025 Valley City State Vikings football team =

American college football season

2025 Valley City State Vikings football
- Conference: Frontier Conference
- Record: 6–4 (3–3 Frontier)
- Head coach: Dennis McCulloch (29th season)
- Offensive coordinator: Dustin Yorek (5th season)
- Defensive coordinator: Gregg Horner (29th season)
- Captains: TaQuez Chatman; Trent Finney; Gavin Gerhardt; Taylor Jones
- Home stadium: Lokken Stadium

2025 Frontier Conference football standings
	Conf.			Overall
Team	W		L	W		L
East Division
No. 5 Montana Tech x^	6	–	0	12	–	1
No. 25 Dakota State	5	–	1	8	–	2
Rocky Mountain	4	–	2	4	–	6
Valley City State	3	–	3	6	–	4
Mayville State	2	–	4	5	–	6
Dickinson State	1	–	5	3	–	7
Montana State–Northern	0	–	6	1	–	10
West Division
No. 4 College of Idaho x^	6	–	0	11	–	2
No. 13 Carroll (MT) ^	5	–	1	9	–	3
No. 18 Montana Western	4	–	2	7	–	3
Eastern Oregon	3	–	3	4	–	6
Southern Oregon	2	–	4	3	–	7
Arizona Christian	1	–	5	2	–	8
Simpson (CA)	0	–	6	0	–	10
x – Division champion/co-champions; ^ – NAIA playoff participant; Rankings from NAIA Coaches' Poll

The 2025 Valley City State Vikings football team represents Valley City State University in the Frontier Conference during the 2025 NAIA football season. The team is led by 29th-year head coach Dennis McCulloch and plays its home games at Dacotah Bank Field at Lokken Stadium in Valley City, North Dakota.

The 2025 season marks Valley City State's first year competing in the Frontier Conference after the collapse of the North Star Athletic Association. VCSU and Mayville State formally joined the Frontier in August 2025 following a conference-wide realignment. In the preseason Frontier coaches’ poll, the Vikings were picked to finish sixth in the East Division.

Valley City State opened the season with a challenging non-conference schedule, including games against Dickinson State, Augsburg, Eastern Oregon and Simpson (CA). The Vikings secured two historic road victories during the year, earning the program's first-ever win in the state of Oregon and first-ever win in the state of Montana with defensive battles at Eastern Oregon and Montana State University–Northern. VCSU finished the season 6–4 overall and 3–3 in Frontier East play, placing fourth in the division.

In their first season as members of the Frontier Conference, the Vikings were picked to finish sixth in the East Division but exceeded expectations by placing fourth.

After dropping the opener at nationally ranked Dickinson State, Valley City State responded with three straight non-conference victories, including shutout wins over Augsburg and rival Mayville State University and a 3–0 road victory at Eastern Oregon University. The Vikings later added a 13–7 win at Montana State University–Northern, marking the program's first football victory in the state of Montana. VCSU finished 6–4 overall and 3–3 in Frontier East play.

== Offseason ==
=== Incoming transfers ===
Over the off-season, Valley City State added 9 players from the transfer portal and junior college levels.

Name	Pos.	Height	Weight	Hometown	Year	Prev. school
Ashton Raquino	LB	6'0"	220	Wahiawa, HI	Junior	Hawaii
Kassius Ashtiani	WR	5'7"	160	Irvine, CA	Redshirt Sophomore	Riverside Community College
Devyne Pearson	RB	5'8"	180	Moreno Valley, CA	Junior	Riverside Community College
Simon-Peter Johnson	WR	6'0"	190	Sierra Vista, AZ	Sophomore	New Mexico Highlands University
Joey Cave	QB	6'0"	190	Rio Rancho, NM	Redshirt Junior	New Mexico Highlands University
Adam Adeboye	OL	6'4"	320	Brooklyn Park, MN	Redshirt Sophomore	Minnesota State University Moorhead
Taalmyn Staton	DL	5'10"	260	Bridgeport, CT	Redshirt Junior	Mount Marty University
Matthew Jacquot	OL	6'3"	280	Cheyenne, WY	Redshirt Junior	Chadron State College
Walker Brondos	K	6'0"	175	Wilkesboro, NC	Redshirt Sophomore	Lenoir Rhyne University

=== Incoming freshman ===
Over the off-season, Valley City State added 35+ players from the high school level.

Name	Pos.	Height	Weight	Hometown	Year	Prev school
Kade Swenson	DB	6'0"	177	Dilworth, MN	Freshman	Dilworth-Glyndon-Felton High School
Eli Leaver	QB	6'0"	193	Tampa, FL	Freshman	Chamberlain High School
Jeremy Yoder	QB	6'1"	193	Lewiston, ID	Freshman	Lewiston High School (Idaho)
Taylor Stefonowicz	QB	6'7"	167	Horace, ND	Freshman	Horace High School
Chad Colburn	DB	5'10"	140	Aiea, HI	Freshman	Aiea High School
Iosua Letuli	LB	6'0"	225	Honolulu, HI	Freshman	Kaimuki High School
Bradyn Bossert	DB	5'10"	195	Velva, ND	Freshman	Velva High School
Mariano Sison	DB	5'8"	164	Aiea, HI	Freshman	Aiea High School
Noah Nelson	DB	6'0"	166	Roseburg, OR	Freshman	Roseburg High School
Shayzen Lopes	DB	6'0"	161	Waianae, HI	Freshman	Waianae High School
Eric Saau	LB	5'9"	186	Aiea, HI	Freshman	Aiea High School
Cayden Isaak	LB	6'0"	185	Beulah, ND	Freshman	Beulah High School
Taurus Allen	DL	6'3"	230	Murfreesboro, TN	Freshman	Oakland High School (Tennessee)
Haiden Crow	LB	5'11"	208	Detroit Lakes, MN	Freshman	Lake Park-Audubon High School
Brody Weisenburger	DL	6'2"	292	New Rockford, ND	Freshman	New Rockford-Sheyenne Public School
Cole Henderson	DL	6'2"	216	Rolla, ND	Freshman	Rolla High School
Bayette Akaka-Folau	DL	6'4"	236	Kapolei, HI	Freshman	Kapolei High School
Nevin Daley	OL	6'5"	369	Pisek, ND	Freshman	Park River High School
Matthew Cruz	OL	6'0"	306	El Paso, TX	Freshman	Austin High School (El Paso, Texas)
Scot Rohde	DL	6'3"	270	Valley City, ND	Freshman	Valley City High School
Rylen Coe	OL	6'4"	271	Lake Benton, MN	Freshman	Elkton High School (SD)
Hunter Lukes	OL	6'0"	221	Lisbon, ND	Freshman	Lisbon High School
Devin Cooper-Jackson	WR	5'7"	161	North Pole, AK	Freshman	North Pole High School
Kaden Austin	WR	5'9"	153	Roseburg, OR	Freshman	Roseburg High School
Slater Kaleiohi	WR	5'6"	140	Waianae, HI	Freshman	Waianae High School
Brysen Ferreira	K	5'5"	130	Waianae, HI	Freshman	Waianae High School
Tyson Ball	WR	6'1"	166	Ewa Beach, HI	Freshman	James Campbell High School
Kyle Cotton	TE	6'4"	285	St. Louis, MO	Freshman	St. Charles West High School
Grant Kinzel	TE	6'5"	240	La Vernia, TX	Freshman	La Vernia High School
Jack Miller	DL	5'10"	231	Fargo, ND	Freshman	Fargo North High School
Savili-Hiapo Castillo-Leovao	DL	6'2"	280	Waimanalo, HI	Freshman	Kamehameha High School
Xander Moody	LS	6'0"	229	Fargo, ND	Freshman	Fargo South High School
Jacob Foss	DL	6'0"	261	Grand Forks, ND	Freshman	Grand Forks Red River High School

=== Coaching staff changes ===
==== Departures ====
Name	Position	New team	New position
Garrett Baldwin	Quarterbacks / Wide receivers coach	Shelton High School (WA)	Head football coach
Alan Busey	Graduate assistant (Wide receivers)	Butte College	Assistant wide receivers coach

==== Additions ====
Name	Position	Previous team	Previous position
Raynor Beierle	Offensive line coach	Northern State University	Graduate assistant (Offensive line)
Nate Pecoraro	Defensive line coach	Valley City State	Defensive line

== Preseason ==
=== Victory Sports Network preview ===
On July 22, 2025, Victory Sports Network released its preseason preview of the Frontier Conference East Division, projecting Valley City State to finish third behind Montana Tech and Dickinson State.

Victory Sports Network identified Valley City State as a contender in the Frontier Conference East Division, noting the return of 13 starters led by wide receiver Jake Deutsch, offensive lineman Jonah Larson, tight end Trent Finney, defensive lineman TaQuez Chatman, and defensive backs Gavin Gerhardt and Emanuel Spiyee. The preview also highlighted transfer quarterback Joey Cave, an honorable mention All-RMAC selection at New Mexico Highlands, as a potential difference-maker for the Vikings.

2025 Victory Sports Network East Division preseason prediction
Predicted finish	Team
1	Montana Tech
2	Dickinson State
3	Valley City State
4	Dakota State
5	Rocky Mountain
6	Mayville State
7	Montana State–Northern

=== Frontier Conference coaches poll ===
The Frontier Conference released its 2025 East Division football coaches' preseason poll on August 18, 2025. Coaches were not permitted to vote for their own teams.

2025 Frontier Conference East Division preseason coaches poll
Predicted finish	Team	Points	First-place votes
1	Montana Tech	34	4
2	Dickinson State	33	3
3	Rocky Mountain	25	—
4	Dakota State	21	—
5	Mayville State	14	—
6	Valley City State	13	—
7	Montana State–Northern	7	—

== Schedule ==
Date	Time	Opponent	Site	Result	Attendance
August 28	7:00 p.m.	at No. 13 Dickinson State*	Biesiot Activities Center; Dickinson, ND (rivaly)	L 15–30	
September 4	6:00 p.m.	Augsburg*	Lokken Stadium; Valley City, ND	W 27–0	200
September 20	3:00 p.m.	at Eastern Oregon*	Community Stadium; La Grande, OR	W 3–0	
September 27	2:00 p.m.	Simpson (CA)*^{†}	Lokken Stadium; Valley City, ND	W 27–21	
October 4	12:00 p.m.	Rocky Mountain	Lokken Stadium; Valley City, ND	L 21–31	300
October 11	1:00 p.m.	Mayville State	Lokken Stadium; Valley City, ND (rivaly)	W 21–0	300
October 18	4:00 p.m.	at Dakota State	Brian Kern Family Stadium; Madison, SD	L 7–40	507
October 25	1:00 p.m.	Dickinson State	Lokken Stadium; Valley City, ND	W 29–21	250
November 8	1:00 p.m.	at Montana State–Northern	Tilleman Field; Havre, MT	W 13–7	
November 15	2:00 p.m.	at No. 4 Montana Tech	Alumni Coliseum; Butte, MT	L 0–41	3,254
*Non-conference game; ^{†}Homecoming; Rankings from NAIA Poll released prior to the game; All times are in Central time

== Personnel ==
=== Coaching staff ===
- Dennis McCulloch – Head Coach / Defensive Backs (32nd season)
- Gregg Horner – Defensive Coordinator / Linebackers (32nd season)
- Dustin Yorek – Offensive Coordinator / Quarterbacks and Wide Receivers (7th season)
- Brandon Bouma – Recruiting Coordinator / Running Backs / Tight Ends / Kickers (9th season)
- Raynor Beierle – Offensive Line (1st season)
- Jahidi West – Defensive Graduate Assistant / Special Teams Coordinator/Defensive Backs (2nd season)
- Leon Smith – Offensive Graduate Assistant / Offensive Line (1st season)
- Nate Pecoraro – Defensive Line (5th season)
- Trent Kosel – Offensive Assistant (4th season)
- Dave Rausch – Defensive Assistant (38th season)

=== Roster ===
2025 Valley City State Vikings football team roster
Players
Coaches
Offense }

Pos.	#	Name	Class
WR	1	Jake Deutsch	Jr
WR	3	Simon-Peter Johnson	So
WR	4	Kassius Ashtiani	So
WR	6	Wuoson Nehwah	Fr
RB	7	Marty Gohn	Sr
RB	9	Laggarius Marshell	So
QB	10	Eli Leaver	Fr
RB	12	Ka'ua Nishigaya	Sr
QB	13	Jeremy Yoder	Fr
TE	14	Will Pfahl	Jr
QB	15	Joey Cave	Jr
QB	16	Taylor Stefonowicz	Fr
WR	18	Exavian Westbrook	Jr
QB	19	Ethan Kastner	Fr
RB	21	Devyne Pearson	Jr
WR	23	Nick Mears	So
WR	25	Mason Nelson	Fr
RB	26	Owen Quail	So
RB	42	Collin Peck	Fr
OL	52	Wadley Lamy	Sr
OL	56	Caden Belgarde	So
OL	60	Tommy Cox	Sr
OL	61	Jaxon Baumgarn	Fr
OL	63	Adam Adeboye	So
OL	64	Caiden Olson	Fr
OL	65	Taylor Jones (C)	So
OL	66	Nevin Daley	Fr
OL	67	Patrick Hall	Fr
OL	68	Matthew Cruz	Fr
OL	70	Rylen Coe	Fr
OL	71	Nolan Thaler	Fr
OL	73	Reese Willprecht	Sr
OL	74	Hunter Lukes	Fr
OL	75	Landon Johansen	Fr
OL	76	Atibordin Sophonsakulrat	Jr
OL	77	Matthew Jacquot	Jr
OL	78	Zackary Pfahl	So
WR	80	Devin Cooper-Jackson	Fr
WR	81	Kaden Austin	Fr
WR	82	Rowen Bucao	So
WR	82	Slater Kaleiohi	Fr
WR	84	Tyson Ball	Fr
TE	85	Kyle Cotton	Fr
TE	87	Trent Finney (C)	Sr
TE	88	Grant Kinzel	Fr
TE	89	Blake Lunde	So

Defense

Pos.	#	Name	Class
DB	0	Gavin Gerhardt (C)	Jr
LB	2	Ashton Raquino	Jr
DB	3	James Dahn	Jr
DB	5	Caleb Torke	So
DB	6	Fafo Lefano	Fr
DL	7	Moziah Rogers-Tivao	Sr
DB	9	Kade Swenson	Fr
LB	10	Riley Olsen	So
LB	11	Aiden Russell	Jr
DB	20	Khalil Toney	Jr
DB	22	Chad Colburn	Fr
LB	22	Levi Olson	Jr
DL	24	Dorian Sandness	Fr
LB	25	Iosua Letuli	Fr
DB	27	Bradyn Bossert	Fr
DB	28	Mariano Sison	Fr
DB	30	Noah Nelson	Fr
DB	31	Jace Stewart	Fr
LB	33	Logan Rist	Fr
DB	34	Tuff Longie	So
DB	35	Shayzen Lopes	Fr
LB	38	Brent Bearman	Fr
DB	39	Hunter Phelps	Sr
LB	40	Jim Miller	So
LB	43	Eric Saau	Fr
LB	44	Javaughn Endemann	Jr
LB	45	Joey Antonutti	So
DL	46	Karbin Brink	So
LB	47	Cayden Isaak	Fr
DL	48	Taurus Allen	Fr
DL	49	Tarren Larson	So
DL	50	TaQuez Chatman (C)	Sr
LB	51	Haiden Crow	Fr
DL	55	Emmitt Maher	Fr
DL	56	Brody Weisenburger	Fr
DL	57	Lorenzo Luchi	So
DL	58	Cole Henderson	Fr
DL	59	Bayette Akaka-Folau	Fr
DL	69	Scot Rohde	Fr
DL	90	Malik Aljack	So
DL	91	Taalmyn Staton	Jr
DL	92	Jack Miller	Fr
DL	93	Paul Webster	Fr
DL	94	Brody O'Keefe	Fr
DL	95	Savili-Hiapo Castillo-Leovao	Fr
DL	97	Jermaine Watson	Fr
DL	98	Jacob Foss	Fr

Special teams

Pos.	#	Name	Class
LS	53	Carter Lyon	Fr
LS	96	Xander Moody	Fr
K	83	Brysen Ferreira	Fr
K	86	Walker Brondos	Fr

Head coach

- Dennis McCulloch (head coach)

Coordinators/assistant coaches

- Gregg Horner (defensive coordinator / linebackers)
- Dustin Yorek (offensive coordinator / quarterbacks / wide receivers)
- Brandon Bouma (running backs / tight ends)
- Raynor Beierle (offensive line)
- Jahidi West (special teams coordinator / safeties)
- Leon Smith (offensive line)
- Nate Pecoraro (defensive line)
- Trent Kosel (quarterbacks / wide receivers)
- Dave Rausch (linebackers)

Legend

- (C) Team captain
- (S) Suspended
- (I) Ineligible
- Injured
- Redshirt

Roster

== Postseason awards ==
All-Frontier East First Team

- DL TaQuez Chatman – Sr.

All-Frontier East Second Team

- DB Gavin Gerhardt – Jr.

All-Frontier East Honorable Mention

- WR Jake Deutsch – Jr.
- LB Aiden Russell – Jr.
- OL Taylor Jones – So.
- OL Tommy Cox – Sr.
- QB Joey Cave – Jr.

Frontier Conference Academic All-Conference

- Adam Adeboye – Sr.
- Joseph Antonutti – So.
- Jaxon Baumgarn – So.
- Caden Belgarde – Jr.
- Walker Brondos – Fr.
- Joey Cave – Jr.
- TaQuez Chatman – Sr.
- Thomas Cox – Jr.
- Jacob Deutsch – Jr.
- Trent Finney – Sr.
- Gavin Gerhardt – Jr.
- Matthew Jacquot – Sr.
- Simon-Peter Johnson – So.
- Taylor Jones – Jr.
- Lorenzo Luchi – So.
- Carter Lyon – Jr.
- Nicholas Mears – Jr.
- James Miller – So.
- Jack Miller – So.
- Xander Moody – So.
- Brody O'Keefe – So.
- Collin Peck – So.
- Owen Quail – Jr.
- Logan Rist – So.
- Atibordin Sophonsakulrat – So.
- Jace Stewart – So.
- Paul Webster – So.
- Reese Willprecht – Sr.

Frontier Conference Champions of Character Award

- Wadley Lamy – Sr.
