= Trevor Utter =

American football coach

Current position
- Title: Head coach
- Team: Simpson (CA)
- Conference: Frontier
- Record: 3–6

Playing career
- 1994–1998: Montana

Coaching career (HC unless noted)
- 2000–2001: Lincoln County HS (assistant)
- 2002–2005: Lincoln County HS (women's basketball)
- 2012–2024: Lincoln County HS
- 2025: Simpson (CA) (WR/TE)
- 2026–present: Simpson (CA)

Head coaching record
- Overall: 3–6 (college); 97–43–2 (high school)
- Tournaments: 16–9 (MHSA)

Accomplishments and honors

Championships
- As a coach: 3 MHSA Class B (2016, 2017, 2019); 3 MHSA Class B – Western (2016, 2017, 2019); As an athlete: NCAA Division I-AA (1995); 3 Big Sky (1995, 1996, 1998)

Awards
- 3× Montana Coaches Association Coach of the Year (2016, 2017, 2019); Academic All-Big Sky (1997)

Trevor Utter is an American college football coach. He is the head football coach for Simpson University, a position he has held since 2026.

== Early life ==
Utter attended high school at Lincoln County High School in Eureka, Montana. Following his graduation, he attended the University of Montana, where he was a member of the Montana Grizzlies football team from 1994 to 1998. While there, he was a member of Montana's first ever NCAA Division I-AA national championship, which they won in 1995 after beating Marshall by a score of 22–20. He also helped the Grizzlies win three Big Sky Conference championships in 1995, 1996, and 1998. In 1997, Utter was named to the Academic All-Big Sky list. He graduated from the University of Montana with a Bachelor of Arts degree in Education as well as Master of Arts degree in Education Leadership.

== Coaching career ==
=== Lincoln County HS ===
Following his graduation from the University of Montana, Utter returned home and had several roles at his alma mater, Lincoln County High School, which included being an assistant coach for the football team from 2000 to 2001 and the head coach of the women's basketball team from 2002 to 2005. He also spent time in administration, serving as the middle school's principal for six years.

In 2012, Utter was named as the head coach of Lincoln County High School's football team. He spent 13 seasons with the Lions, accumulating an overall record of 97–43–2. Under his watch, the Lions won three MHSA Class B State Championships in 2016, 2017, and 2019. Utter was subsequently named as the Montana Coaches Association Class B Coach of the Year after each state championship in 2016, 2017, and 2019.

=== Simpson ===
In December 2024, it was announced that Utter would be joining the Simpson Red Hawks football team as an assistant coach. In his first season at Simpson University, the Red Hawks accumulated an overall record of 0–10 (0–6 in the Frontier West Division). Following the season, head coach Shawn Daniel announced that he was resigning from his position and Utter was subsequently named as the head coach of the Red Hawks.

== Head coaching record ==
=== College ===
| Year | Team | Overall | Conference | Standing | Bowl/playoffs |
|---|---|---|---|---|---|
Simpson Red Hawks (Frontier Conference) (2026–present)
| 2026 | Simpson | 3–6 | 1–4 | (West) | |
| Simpson: | | 3–6 | 1–4 | | |
| Total: | | 3–6 | | | |

=== High school ===
| Year | Team | Overall | Conference | Standing | Bowl/playoffs |
|---|---|---|---|---|---|
Lincoln County HS (MHSA Class B – Western) (2012–2024)
| 2012 | Lincoln County HS | 4–5–1 | 4–1 | 2nd | L MHSA Class B first round |
| 2013 | Lincoln County HS | 5–5–1 | 3–2 | 2nd | L MHSA Class B first round |
| 2014 | Lincoln County HS | 3–7 | 2–2 | 2nd | L MHSA Class B first round |
| 2015 | Lincoln County HS | 3–7 | 2–3 | 3rd | |
| 2016 | Lincoln County HS | 12–1 | 4–0 | 1st | W MHSA Class B Championship |
| 2017 | Lincoln County HS | 11–0 | 5–0 | 1st | W MHSA Class B Championship |
| 2018 | Lincoln County HS | 6–3 | 4–2 | 3rd | L MHSA Class B first round |
| 2019 | Lincoln County HS | 12–0 | 5–0 | 1st | W MHSA Class B Championship |
| 2020 | Lincoln County HS | 6–3 | 4–1 | 2nd | L MHSA Class B first round |
| 2021 | Lincoln County HS | 10–3 | 4–1 | 2nd | L MHSA Class B Semifinal |
| 2022 | Lincoln County HS | 6–4 | 3–2 | 3rd | L MHSA Class B first round |
| 2023 | Lincoln County HS | 9–2 | 4–1 | 2nd | L MHSA Class B Quarterfinal |
| 2024 | Lincoln County HS | 8–3 | 3–2 | 3rd | L MHSA Class B Quarterfinal |
| Lincoln County HS: | | 97–43–2 | | | |
| Total: | | 47–17 | | | |
National championship Conference title Conference division title or championship game berth

== Personal life ==
His son, Caleb, was a defensive back for the Montana Western Bulldogs from 2023 to 2024 and currently plays for the Simpson Red Hawks.
