= Todd Reed =

Todd Reed may refer to:

- Todd Reed (author)
- Todd Reed (designer)
- Todd Alan Reed, American serial killer and sex offender

== See also ==
- Todd Reid, Australian tennis player
