= 2012 Frontier Conference football season =

- League: NAIA
- Sport: football
- Duration: Fall-Winter 2012
- Number of teams: 9

2012
- Conference Champion: Southern Oregon; Montana Tech (co-champions)

Football seasons
- ← 2011 2013 →

2012 Frontier Conference football standings
	Conf.			Overall
Team	W		L	W		L
No. 5 Southern Oregon +^	8	–	2	9	–	3
No. 12 Montana Tech +^	8	–	2	8	–	3
No. 21 Carroll (MT)	7	–	3	7	–	4
Rocky Mountain	5	–	5	6	–	5
Eastern Oregon	4	–	6	4	–	6
Montana Western	4	–	6	4	–	6
Montana State–Northern	3	–	7	3	–	7
Dickinson State	1	–	9	2	–	9
+ – Conference co-champions; ^ – NAIA playoff participant; Rankings from NAIA Coaches' Poll

The 2012 Frontier Conference football season was made up of nine United States college athletic programs that competed in the Frontier Conference under the National Association of Intercollegiate Athletics (NAIA) for the 2012 college football season. Southern Oregon and Montana Tech were declared co-champions at the end of the season. Both championship teams advanced to the 2012 NAIA Football National Championship.

== Awards ==
The conference made the following awards at the end of the season:

- Austin Dodge of Southern Oregon University-Offensive Player of the Year.
- Howard McDonald of Eastern Oregon-Defensive Player of the Year.
- Chuck Morrell of Montana Tech - 2012 Coach of the Year.

The conference also selected other players to all-conference first and second teams and also declared academic all-conference team honors. Carroll College led the academic awards with 31 student-athletes selected.

Two coaches from the conference were recognized by the American Football Coaches Association. Head coach Chuck Morrell of Montana Tech was named the NAIA Region 5 Coach of the Year and Jim Hogan at Carroll College was a finalist for Assistant Coach of the Year honors.
