= Chris Stutzriem =

American football coach (born 1988)

Current position
- Title: Head coach
- Team: Bismarck State
- Conference: Frontier
- Record: 0–0

Biographical details
- Born: December 26, 1988 (age 37)

Playing career
- 2007–2008: Wyoming
- 2009: Indiana State
- 2010: Morningside
- Position: Quarterback

Coaching career (HC unless noted)
- 2011–2012: William Penn (GA)
- 2013: South Dakota (RB)
- 2014–2015: William Penn (OC/QB)
- 2016–2017: Rocky Mountain (OC/QB)
- 2018: Southwestern Oklahoma State (OL)
- 2019–2025: Rocky Mountain
- 2026–present: Bismarck State

Head coaching record
- Overall: 30–35

Accomplishments and honors

Championships
- 1 Frontier (2021)

Awards
- Frontier Conference Coach of the Year (2021)

Chris Stutzriem (born December 26, 1988) is an American college football coach and former player. He is the head football coach for Bismarck State College in Bismarck, North Dakota, a position he has held since 2026. Stutzriem served as the head football coach at Rocky Mountain College in Billings, Montana from 2019 to 2025.

== Early life ==
Stutzriem was born on December 26, 1988. He played high school football at Eisenhower High School in Lawton, Oklahoma. His junior year in 2005, he completed 113 of 207 passes (54.6%) for 1,748 yards, 15 touchdowns and seven interceptions while also rushing for six touchdowns. As a senior team captain in 2006, Stutzriem completed 161 of 225 passes (71.6%) for 19 touchdowns and eight interceptions while rushing for 148 yards and nine touchdowns, earning Class 6A Old Spice Red Zone Player of the Year and The Oklahoman honorable mention all-state honors. In the class of 2007, he was rated as the no. 18 overall recruit in Oklahoma and the No. 1 quarterback in Oklahoma by Rivals.com. He also played baseball in high school and earned all-state honors as a junior. Stutzriem was also a member of the National Honor Society all four years of high school.

== College career ==
Stutzriem redshirted for the Wyoming Cowboys of the University of Wyoming in 2007. He started the final four games of the 2008 season, totaling a 2–2 record, including a 13–7 upset victory over the Tennessee Volunteers. Overall in 2008, he recorded 55 completions on 98 passing attempts (56.1%) for 660 yards, five touchdowns, and five interceptions, garnering Mountain West all-freshman recognition.

Stutzriem transferred to play for the Indiana State Sycamores of Indiana State University in 2009. He majored in communications and business marketing at Indiana State.

Stutzriem transferred again in 2010 to play his final season of college football for the Morningside Mustangs of Morningside College. He completed 106 of 197 passes for 1,505 yards and 11 touchdowns during the 2010 season. He graduated from Morningside with a bachelor's degree in sports broadcasting in 2011.

== Coaching career ==
Stutzriem began his coaching career as a graduate assistant working with the wide receivers for the William Penn Statesmen of William Penn University from 2011 to 2012. He was then the running backs coach for the South Dakota Coyotes of the University of South Dakota in 2013. He returned to William Penn to serve as the offensive coordinator and quarterbacks coach from 2014 to 2015.

Stutzriem then served as the offensive coordinator and quarterbacks coach for the Rocky Mountain Battlin' Bears of Rocky Mountain College from 2016 to 2017. He was the offensive line coach for the Southwestern Oklahoma State Bulldogs of Southwestern Oklahoma State University in 2018. In December 2018, he was named Rocky Mountain's new head coach after Jason Petrino resigned to become the defensive coordinator at Southern Illinois University. Stutzriem was named the Frontier Conference Coach of the Year in 2021. In January 2023, he interviewed for Minot State's vacant head coaching position.

In December 2025, he stepped down at Rocky Mountain to move to Bismarck State College, which is bringing its football program back in 2027.

== Personal life ==
Stutzriem graduated from William Penn University with a master's degree in business leadership in 2013. His brother, Adam, played football at Oklahoma Panhandle State University.

== Head coaching record ==
=== College ===
| Year | Team | Overall | Conference | Standing | Bowl/playoffs | NAIA^{#} |
|---|---|---|---|---|---|---|
Rocky Mountain Battlin' Bears (Frontier Conference) (2019–2025)
| 2019 | Rocky Mountain | 4–7 | 3–7 | 7th | | |
| 2020 | Rocky Mountain | 1–3 | 1–3 | 4th | | |
| 2021 | Rocky Mountain | 7–3 | 7–3 | T–1st | | 21 |
| 2022 | Rocky Mountain | 6–4 | 4–4 | 5th | | |
| 2023 | Rocky Mountain | 6–4 | 4–4 | 6th | | |
| 2024 | Rocky Mountain | 2–8 | 1–7 | T–7th | | |
| 2025 | Rocky Mountain | 4–6 | 4–2 | 3rd (East) | | |
| Rocky Mountain: | | 30–35 | 24–30 | | | |
| Total: | | 30–35 | | | | |
National championship Conference title Conference division title or championship game berth
^{#}Rankings from final NAIA Coaches' Poll.
