= 2025 NAIA football rankings =

Rankings for the 2025 NAIA football season

- Season: 2025
- Postseason: Single-elimination
- National champions: Grand View
- Runner up: Keiser
- Conference with most teams in final poll: Frontier (5)

The 2025 National Association of Intercollegiate Athletics (NAIA) football rankings are conducted on a week-to-week basis, starting after week three.

== Legend ==
| | Increase in ranking |
| | Decrease in ranking |
| | Not ranked previous week or no change |
| | Selected for NAIA playoffs |
| (#–#) | Win–loss record |
| (Italics) | Number of first place votes |
| т | Tied with team above or below also with this symbol |

== NAIA Coaches' poll ==
| | Preseason August 25 | Week 1 September 15 | Week 2 September 22 | Week 3 September 29 | Week 4 October 6 | Week 5 October 13 | Week 6 October 20 | Week 7 October 27 | Week 8 November 3 | Week 9 November 10 | Week 10 (Final) November 16 | Final January 5 | |
|---|---|---|---|---|---|---|---|---|---|---|---|---|---|
| 1. | Grand View (16) | Grand View (2–0) (16) | Grand View (3–0) (16) | Grand View (4–0) (16) | Grand View (5–0) (15) | Grand View (5–0) (15) | Grand View (6–0) (16) | Grand View (7–0) (15) | Grand View (8–0) (14) | Grand View (9–0) (15) | Grand View (10–0) (15) | Grand View (14–0) (16) | 1. |
| 2. | Keiser | Keiser (2–0) | Keiser (3–0) | Keiser (3–0) | Keiser (4–0) | Keiser (5–0) | Keiser (6–0) | Keiser (7–0) (1) | Keiser (8–0) (2) | Keiser (9–0) (1) | Keiser (10–0) (1) | Keiser (12–1) | 2. |
| 3. | Morningside | Benedictine (KS) (2–1) | Benedictine (KS) (3–1) | Benedictine (KS) (4–1) | Benedictine (KS) (5–1) | Benedictine (KS) (5–1) | Benedictine (KS) (6–1) | Benedictine (KS) (7–1) | Benedictine (KS) (8–1) | Benedictine (KS) (9–1) | Benedictine (KS) (10–1) | Benedictine (KS) (12–2) | 3. |
| 4. | Benedictine (KS) | Morningside (1–1) | Morningside (2–1) | Morningside (3–1) | Morningside (4–1) | Morningside (5–1) | Friends (7–0) т | Friends (8–0) | Friends (9–0) | Friends (10–0) т | Montana Tech (11–0) | College of Idaho (11–2) | 4. |
| 5. | Montana Western | Indiana Wesleyan (2–1) | Indiana Wesleyan (3–1) | Montana Tech (5–0) | Friends (6–0) | Friends (6–0) | Montana Tech (7–0) т | Montana Tech (8–0) | Montana Tech (9–0) | Montana Tech (10–0) т | Friends (11–0) | Montana Tech (12–1) | 5. |
| 6. | Indiana Wesleyan | Georgetown (KY) (3–0) | Montana Tech (4–0) | Friends (5–0) | Lindsey Wilson (5–0) | Montana Tech (7–0) | Campbellsville (6–0) | Dordt (7–0) | Dordt (8–0) | Dordt (9–0) | Marian (IN) (10–1) | Friends (12–1) | 6. |
| 7. | Northwestern (IA) | Montana Tech (3–0) | Friends (4–0) | Lindsey Wilson (4–0) | Montana Tech (6–0) | Lindsey Wilson (6–0) | Dordt (6–0) | Marian (IN) (7–1) | Marian (IN) (8–1) | Marian (IN) (9–1) | Lindsey Wilson (9–1) | Lindsey Wilson (10–2) | 7. |
| 8. | St. Thomas (FL) | Friends (3–0) | Lindsey Wilson (4–0) | Montana Western (3–1) | Montana Western (4–1) | St. Thomas (FL) (4–1) | Marian (IN) (6–1) | Carroll (MT) (7–1) | Carroll (MT) (7–1) | Lindsey Wilson (8–1) | Morningside (9–2) | Morningside (9–3) | 8. |
| 9. | Georgetown (KY) | Montana Western (1–1) | Montana Western (2–1) | St. Thomas (FL) (2–1) | St. Thomas (FL) (3–1) | Campbellsville (5–0) | Carroll (MT) (6–1) | Lindsey Wilson (7–1) | Lindsey Wilson (7–1) | Morningside (8–2) | College of Idaho (9–1) | Dordt (10–1) | 9. |
| 10. | Texas Wesleyan | Lindsey Wilson (3–0) | St. Thomas (FL) (2–1) | Southeastern (3–0) | Campbellsville (5–0) | Dordt (5–0) | Lindsey Wilson (6–1) | Morningside (6–2) | Morningside (7–2) | Campbellsville (8–1) | Indiana Wesleyan (9–2) | Indiana Wesleyan (9–3) | 10. |
| 11. | Montana Tech | Dickinson State (2–0) | Southeastern (3–0) | Georgetown (KY) (3–1) | Dordt (4–0) | Marian (IN) (5–1) | Morningside (5–2) | Campbellsville (6–1) | Campbellsville (7–1) | OUAZ (8–0) т | Dordt (9–1) | Campbellsville (8–3) | 11. |
| 12. | Friends | MidAmerica Nazarene (3–0) | Georgetown (KY) (3–1) | Campbellsville (4–0) | Marian (IN) (4–1) | Carroll (MT) (5–1) | OUAZ (6–0) | OUAZ (7–0) | OUAZ (7–0) | Indiana Wesleyan (8–2) т | Southeastern (8–2) | William Penn (11–2) | 12. |
| 13. | Dickinson State | Southeastern (2–0) | Campbellsville (4–0) | Dordt (3–0) | OUAZ (4–0) | OUAZ (5–0) | St. Thomas (FL) (4–2) | Indiana Wesleyan (6–2) | Indiana Wesleyan (7–2) | College of Idaho (8–1) | Carroll (MT) (8–2) | Carroll (MT) (9–3) | 13. |
| 14. | Southwestern (KS) | St. Thomas (FL) (1–1) | Northwestern (IA) (2–1) | Marian (IN) (3–1) | Indiana Wesleyan (4–2) т | Indiana Wesleyan (4–2) | Indiana Wesleyan (5–2) | Southeastern (6–1) | Southeastern (7–1) | Carroll (MT) (7–2) | William Penn (10–1) | Southeastern (9–3) | 14. |
| 15. | MidAmerica Nazarene | Northwestern (IA) (1–1) | Dordt (2–0) | OUAZ (3–0) | Carroll (MT) (4–1) т | Montana Western (4–2) | Southwestern (KS) (6–1) | College of Idaho (6–1) | College of Idaho (7–1) | Southeastern (7–2) | Campbellsville (8–2) | Marian (IN) (8–4) | 15. |
| 16. | Baker (KS) | Campbellsville (3–0) | OUAZ (3–0) | Indiana Wesleyan (3–2) | Southwestern (KS) (5–1) | Southwestern (KS) (5–1) | College of Idaho (5–1) | Georgetown (KY) (5–2) | St. Thomas (FL) (5–3) | William Penn (9–1) | St. Thomas (FL) (7–3) | Saint Francis (IN) (10–3) | 16. |
| 17. | Southeastern | Dordt (2–0) | Southwestern (KS) (3–1) | Carroll (MT) (3–1) | Concordia (NE) (4–0) | Southeastern (4–1) | Southeastern (5–1) | St. Thomas (FL) (4–3) | William Penn (8–1) | St. Thomas (FL) (6–3) | Montana Western (7–3) | St. Thomas (FL) (7–4) | 17. |
| 18. | OUAZ | OUAZ (2–0) | Carroll (MT) (2–1) | Southwestern (KS) (4–1) | Southeastern (3–1) | Georgetown (KY) (4–2) | Georgetown (KY) (5–2) | Southwestern (KS) (6–2) | McPherson (8–1) | Montana Western (7–3) | Georgetown (KY) (7–3) | Montana Western (7–3) | 18. |
| 19. | Dordt | Texas Wesleyan (1–1) | Marian (IN) (2–1) | Concordia (NE) (3–0) | Georgetown (KY) (3–2) | Texas Wesleyan (4–2) | Olivet Nazarene (5–1) | William Penn (7–1) | Montana Western (6–3) | Northwestern (IA) (6–3) | Saint Francis (IN) (9–2) | Evangel (9–3) | 19. |
| 20. | Campbellsville | Southwestern (KS) (2–1) | Dickinson State (2–1) | William Penn (5–0) | Texas Wesleyan (3–2) | McPherson (6–0) т | Montana Western (4–3) | Montana Western (5–3) | Northwestern (IA) (5–3) | Georgetown (KY) (6–3) | OUAZ (8–1) | Georgetown (KY) (7–3) | 20. |
| 21. | Concordia (NE) | Marian (IN) (2–1) | Concordia (NE) (2–0) | Texas Wesleyan (2–2) | McPherson (6–0) | College of Idaho (4–1) т | William Penn (6–1) | McPherson (7–1) | Georgetown (KY) (5–3) | Saint Francis (IN) (8–2) | Evangel (9–2) | Southwestern (KS) (8–3) | 21. |
| 22. | Southern Oregon | Evangel (3–0) | Texas Wesleyan (1–2) | Northwestern (IA) (2–2) | College of Idaho (4–1) | MidAmerica Nazarene (5–1) | McPherson (6–1) | Olivet Nazarene (5–2) | Saint Francis (IN) (7–2) | Evangel (8–2) | Southwestern (KS) (8–3) т | McPherson (9–2) | 22. |
| 23. | Marian (IN) | Concordia (NE) (2–0) | MidAmerica Nazarene (3–1) | MidAmerica Nazarene (4–1) | MidAmerica Nazarene (5–1) | Olivet Nazarene (4–1) | Concordia (NE) (5–1) | Northwestern (IA) (4–3) | Evangel (7–2) | Southwestern (KS) (7–3) | McPherson (9–2) т | Reinhardt (7–4) | 23. |
| 24. | Saint Francis (IN) | Southern Oregon (1–1) | William Penn (4–0) | McPherson (5–0) | Olivet Nazarene (3–1) | Saint Francis (IN) (5–1) | Northwestern (IA) (4–3) | Evangel (6–2) | Texas Wesleyan (6–3) | McPherson (8–2) | Dakota State (8–2) | Texas Wesleyan (7–5) | 24. |
| 25. | Carroll (MT) | Carroll (MT) (1–1) | College of Idaho (3–0) | College of Idaho (3–1) | Saint Francis (IN) (4–1) | William Penn (5–1) | Texas Wesleyan (4–3) т; Bethel (TN) (3–2) т | Texas Wesleyan (5–3) | Southwestern (KS) (6–3) | Saint Xavier (7–3) | Texas Wesleyan (7–4) | Dakota State (8–2) | 25. |
| | Preseason August 25 | Week 1 September 15 | Week 2 September 22 | Week 3 September 29 | Week 4 October 6 | Week 5 October 13 | Week 6 October 20 | Week 7 October 27 | Week 8 November 3 | Week 9 November 10 | Week 10 (Final) November 16 | Final January 5 | |
| | | Dropped: Baker (KS) (0–2); Saint Francis (IN) (2–1) | Dropped: Evangel (3–1); Southern Oregon (1–2) | Dropped: Dickinson State (2–2) | Dropped: William Penn (5–1); Northwestern (IA) (2–3) | Dropped: Concordia (NE) (4–1) | Dropped: MidAmerica Nazarene (5–2); Saint Francis (IN) (5–2) | Dropped: Concordia (NE) (5–2); Bethel (TN) (3–3) | Dropped: Olivet Nazarene (5–3) | Dropped: Texas Wesleyan (6–4) | Dropped: Saint Xavier (7–4); Northwestern (IA) (6–4) | Dropped: OUAZ (8–1) | |
