= Bob Green (American football) =

American football coach (born c. 1950)

Biographical details
- Born: c. 1950 (age 75–76); Lincoln, Nebraska, U.S.
- Education: University of Nebraska at Kearney (1974)

Playing career
- 1970–1973: Kearney State
- Position: Defensive back

Coaching career (HC unless noted)
- 1974: Kearney State (SA)
- 1975–1979: Minatare HS (NE)
- 1980–1981: Northern Colorado (WR)
- 1981–1982: Broken Bow HS (NE)
- 1982–1986: Northwest Missouri State (OC)
- 1987–2010: Montana Tech

Head coaching record
- Overall: 130–112 (college); 15–19–3 (high school; Minatare)
- Tournaments: 0–1 (NAIA D-II playoffs); 1–1 (NAIA D-I playoffs); 2–3 (NAIA playoffs)

Accomplishments and honors

Championships
- 6 Frontier Conference (1992, 1996–1997, 2000–2001, 2004)

Awards
- 6× Frontier Conference Coach of the Year

Records
- Longest Tenured and Most Winning Coach in Montana Tech history

Bob Green (born c. 1950) is an American former college football coach. He was the head football coach for Montana Technological University from 1987 to 2010.

== Early life ==
Bob Green graduated from Lincoln Southeast High School in Lincoln, Nebraska in 1968. Following his graduation, Green enlisted in the United States Marine Corps and served approximately two years in the Vietnam War. He received basic decorations for his service, including the National Defense Service Medal, Vietnam Service Medal, and Combat Action Ribbon, among others.

Upon his release from the Marine Corps, Green attended the University of Nebraska at Kearney from 1970 to 1974, where he played as a defensive back for four years. After his graduation, Green stayed at the school as a student assistant coach for a year, which began his coaching career.

== Coaching career ==
After coaching for a year as a student assistant at his alma mater, Green became the head coach and athletic director at Minatare High School in Minatare, Nebraska from 1975 to 1979. In 1980, Green took an assistant coach job at Northern Colorado, and returned to high school coaching in 1981, where he became the head coach for Broken Bow High School in Broken Bow, Nebraska for a year. In 1982, Green took another college assistant coaching job and joined the staff of Northwest Missouri State until his departure following the 1986 season.

=== Montana Tech ===
Bob Green accepted the head coaching job at Montana Tech in 1987. At the time of his arrival, the Montana Tech football program hadn't made a post-season appearance since 1971. However, by 1992, the Orediggers had a 7–4 record and a playoff berth, and in 1996, Montana Tech became the first Frontier Conference school to ever make the NAIA National Championship game.

Under Bob Green, Montana Tech had its most successful period in football. During Green's 24-year tenure, the Orediggers compiled a record of 130 wins and 112 losses. Green led Montana Tech to the NAIA National Playoffs five times (1992, 1996, 1997, 2004, and 2005), including the 1996 National Championship Game. Bob Green retired from coaching following the 2010 season. Green remained active with the school after his retirement, working in various publicity and development positions.

=== Legacy ===
In 2013, Montana Tech's football stadium, Alumni Coliseum, replaced its grass field with a new artificial turf surface. The school named the new field after Green in honor of his accomplishments. Green was inducted into the school's athletic hall of fame the same year.

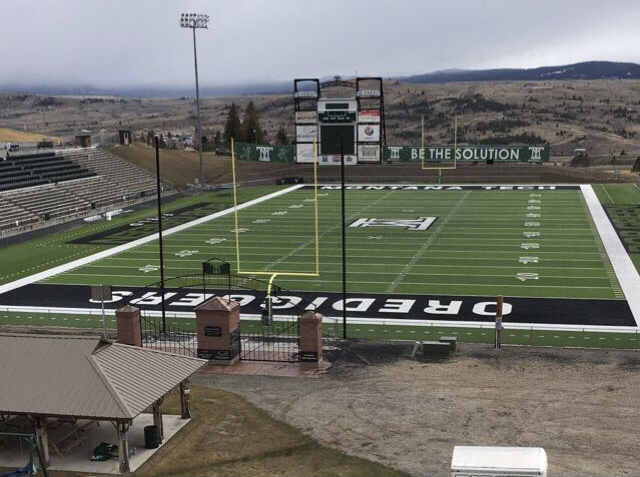
Bob Green Field at Alumni Coliseum in 2017.

== In popular culture ==
Video compilations of Green's interviews have gone viral over the years due to his sense of humor and unusual sayings.

Quotes from Bob Green include:

- "We were like the kid that plays second french horn in the school band, we gotta play better."
- "It's a double edged sword. It's like watching your mother-in-law go off a cliff in a Cadillac. You have mixed feelings."
- "He's like a black lab on the first day of pheasant hunting season, he was pulling at the chain."
- "We gotta be like a woodpecker in a petrified forest, just keep busy and look for opportunities."
- "I wanted to raise my kids using a depth chart! Can you imagine that? Pam Green vetoed that idea."
- "I've got a real short memory, just like when I was in third grade. Two of the best years of my life!"
- "I don't like that bottled water, I like that Butte water. You get to eat and drink at the same time."
- "Some aspects look like we're really ready to play. A couple other aspects look like we just got off Willie Nelson's tour bus."
- "His attitude is positive, he thinks he can take on hell with a squirt gun."
- "My wife couldn't go to church with me on Sunday. Everybody said, "where is she?" I said she doesn't go out with losers."
- "You could've used that to torture prisoners into making confessions. That was a bad football game."
- "I used to coach high school track. I wasn't a very good coach, I told them to turn left and come back soon."
- "Don't pour a bucket of water over my head and tell me it's raining. Know the rules!"

== Head coaching record ==
Year	Team	Overall	Conference	Standing	Bowl/playoffs	NAIA Coaches'^{#}
Montana Tech Orediggers (Frontier Conference) (1987–2010)
1987	Montana Tech	4–5	2–3	2nd		
1988	Montana Tech	6–3	4–2	2nd		
1989	Montana Tech	3–7	1–5	4th		
1990	Montana Tech	4–5	3–3	T–2nd		
1991	Montana Tech	5–4	3–3	T–2nd		
1992	Montana Tech	7–4	4–2	T–1st	L NAIA Division II First Round	16
1993	Montana Tech	5–4	2–4	3rd		
1994	Montana Tech	5–5	4–2	2nd		
1995	Montana Tech	2–7	2–4	3rd		
1996	Montana Tech	7–5	4–2	1st	L NAIA Division I Championship	2
1997	Montana Tech	10–2	6–0	1st	L NAIA Quarterfinal	4
1998	Montana Tech	5–5	3–3	2nd		
1999	Montana Tech	7–4	6–2	2nd		
2000	Montana Tech	7–4	6–2	T–1st		23
2001	Montana Tech	8–3	7–1	T–1st		16
2002	Montana Tech	4–7	3–5	3rd		
2003	Montana Tech	3–8	3–5	3rd		
2004	Montana Tech	8–4	6–2	T–1st	L NAIA First Round	13
2005	Montana Tech	9–4	6–2	2nd	L NAIA Second Round	7
2006	Montana Tech	6–5	6–4	3rd		
2007	Montana Tech	7–4	6–4	2nd		
2008	Montana Tech	4–7	4–6	T–3rd		
2009	Montana Tech	7–4	7–3	T–2nd		
2010	Montana Tech	5–6	5–5	T–3rd		
Montana Tech:		130–112	97–73			
Total:		130–112				
National championship Conference title Conference division title or championship game berth
