= Montana Tech Orediggers football =

Montana Technological University college American football team

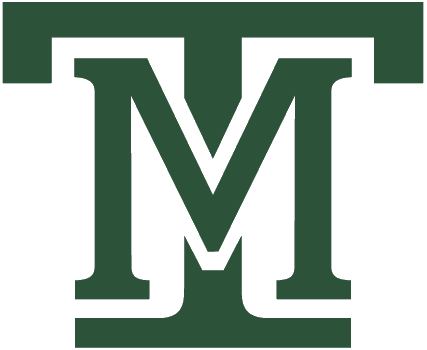
- First season: 1902; 124 years ago
- Athletic director: Matt Stepan
- Head coach: Kyle Samson; 5th season, 40–16 (.714)
- Location: Butte, Montana
- Stadium: Alumni Coliseum (capacity: 2,000)
- Field: Bob Green Field
- League: NAIA
- Conference: Frontier Conference
- Colors: Green and copper

Conference championships
- 1936, 1939, 1970, 1972, 1979, 1983, 1992, 1996, 1997, 2004, 2012, 2015, 2016

Division championships
- 2025
- Rivalries: Carroll (MT)
- Mascot: Orediggers
- Website: godiggers.com/football

The Montana Tech Orediggers football program represents Montana Technological University in college football as members of the National Association of Intercollegiate Athletics (NAIA), as members of the Frontier Conference.

== History ==
=== Bob Green Era (1986–2010) ===
During the era of head coach Bob Green, Montana Tech had its most successful period ever in football. In his 24-year tenure, the Orediggers accomplished a record of 140 wins, 116 losses, and 1 tie. During this period, the Orediggers either placed or tied for first or second in the Frontier Conference 16 times. Green led the Diggers to the NAIA National Playoffs 5 times, including the 1996 National Championship Game. The Orediggers were the first ever Frontier Conference football team to play for the national title. Bob Green retired from coaching following the 2010 season. In 2013, Montana Tech's stadium, Alumni Coliseum, replaced its grass field with a new artificial turf surface; the new field was named after Green. Green was inducted into the school's athletic hall of fame the same year.

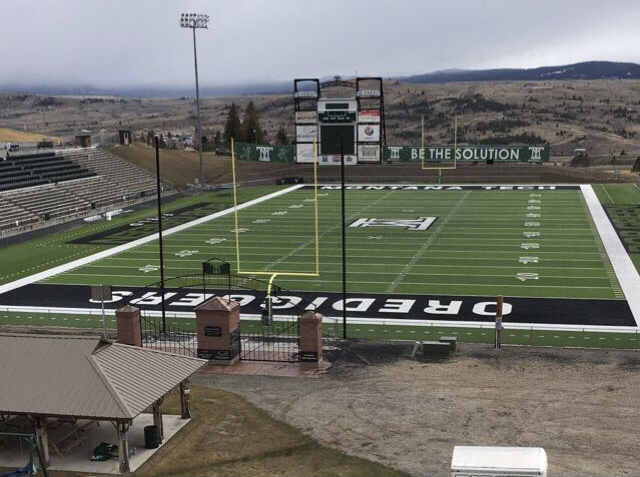
Bob Green Field at Alumni Coliseum in 2017.

=== Chuck Morrell Era (2011–2019) ===
Following Green's retirement, Chuck Morrell, who had previously been the defensive coordinator at South Dakota, was hired as the Orediggers' new head coach. Montana Tech posted a total record of 52 wins and 44 losses under Morrell and made the playoffs in 2012, 2015, and 2016, including winning the 2012 Frontier Conference championship, the team's first since 2004. During Morrell's tenure, he received the Frontier Conference coach of the year award in 2012, 2015, and 2016. Morrell left the team following the 2019 season in order to take an assistant coaching job at NCAA Division I Fresno State.

=== Kyle Samson Era (2020–present) ===
Following Morrell's departure, the Orediggers named offensive coordinator Kyle Samson as the team's new head coach. Before Montana Tech, Samson was the head coach at Flathead High School in Kalispell, Montana for five years, and became Tech's offensive coordinator for just one season before being promoted to head coach.

In 2020, Samson's first season, Montana Tech did not play a football season due to the COVID-19 pandemic. The Frontier Conference held a modified, conference-only season in the spring of 2021, but Montana Tech (as well as Montana Western and Southern Oregon) did not participate.

In 2025, Samson led Montana Tech to a 12–1 overall and 6–1 conference record, claiming the Frontier East division title. The Orediggers received the No. 3 overall seed in the NAIA playoffs, advancing to the quarterfinals. Samson was named the NAIA Coach of the Year by the Victory Sports Network.

== Conference affiliation ==
Montana Tech has been a member of the Frontier Conference of the NAIA since 1934. The conference was organized as the Montana Small College Conference in 1934 with charter members Montana Tech, Northern Montana College, Billings Polytechnic Institute, Montana State Normal College, and Intermountain Union College before rebranding to the Montana Collegiate Conference in 1936 and the Frontier Conference in 1966.
