= Montana Tech Orediggers =

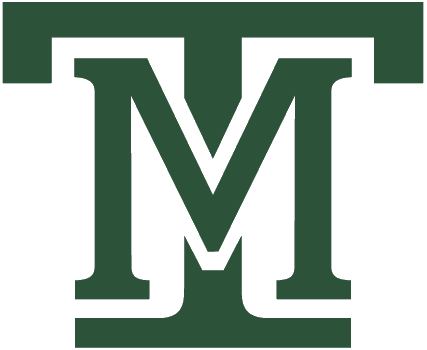
- University: Montana Tech
- Nickname: Oredigger
- Association: NAIA
- Conference: Frontier
- Athletic director: Matt Stepan
- Location: Butte, Montana, U.S.
- Varsity teams: 10
- Football stadium: Alumni Coliseum
- Basketball arena: HPER Complex
- Volleyball arena: HPER Complex
- Colors: Green and copper
- Website: godiggers.com
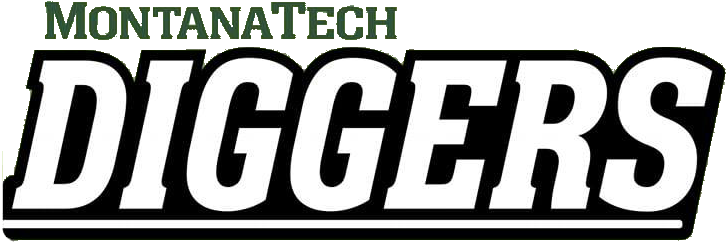

The Montana Tech Orediggers are the athletics teams representing Montana Technological University in Butte, Montana. The nickname Orediggers is an homage to Butte's mining history. The university is a member of the National Association of Intercollegiate Athletics (NAIA), primarily competing in the Frontier Conference since the 1933–34 academic year.

Montana Tech competes in 12 intercollegiate varsity sports: men's sports include basketball, cross country, football, golf, and track & field (indoor and outdoor); women's sports include basketball, cross country, golf, track & field (indoor and outdoor), and volleyball.

Montana Tech won the conference's most prestigious all-sports recognition, called the Bandy Award, in 2023, marking the first time since 1993 to do so.

== Varsity teams ==
Men's sports	Women's sports
Basketball	Basketball
Cross country	Cross country
Football	Golf
Golf	Track and field^{1}
Track and field^{1}	Volleyball
^{1} – includes both indoor and outdoor

=== Basketball ===
The Orediggers men's basketball team, coached by Adam Hiatt, made history by becoming the first men's basketball program to win four consecutive Frontier Conference regular season and tournament championships in 2021–22, 2022–23, 2023–24, and 2024-25. The Diggers own several conference records, including the best overall conference record (14–1 conference mark set in 2023-24) and the highest scoring margin in league play (+15.1 margin). Montana Tech also set a Frontier Conference record for most points scored in a championship game (103 points in the 2022–23 season), as well as the largest regular season margin (5 game margin in 2023). After setting school records for most overall wins (27) in 2021–22, the program eclipsed that mark in 2022–23 with a 29–5 overall record. The Orediggers are 107–23 over the past four seasons (27–7, 29–5, 27–5, 24-6).

The Diggers hosted the first two rounds of the NAIA National Tournament in back-to-back seasons (2022–23 and 2023–24). Montana Tech won their Regional Bracket to advance to the final site in Kansas City for the first time in program history in 2022–23. There, they upset #1 seed William Penn to advance to the National Quarterfinal. The 2024–25 team reached the highest Top 25 National Ranking in program history at #5, as well as becoming the first team in school history to win 20+ games in four straight seasons. The 2024-25 team also set a school record as the fastest team to reach 20 wins in a season (22 games).

The Orediggers won the Frontier Conference regular season championship in 1984, '85, '88, '91, '93, 2022, '23, '24, '25 and conference tournament championships in 1983, ‘84, ‘85, ‘88, ‘93, ‘98, ‘99, ‘22, '23, '24, '25. Montana Tech has competed in the NAIA National Tournament in 1998, '99, 2022, '23, '24, and '25. The Orediggers beat rival Carroll College 62–61 on February 28, 2022 to win their first Frontier Conference tournament championship since 1999.

==== All-American honorees ====
(since 2016–17)

- Chris O'Neill (HM 2018)
- Taylor England (HM 2019, HM 2020)
- Sindou Diallo (HM 2020, HM 2021, 2nd Team 2022)
- Caleb Bellach (HM 2022, 1st Team 2023)
- Asa Williams (3rd Team 2024)

==== Frontier Conference Awards ====
(since 2016–17)

- Coach of the Year (Adam Hiatt 2023, 2024, 2025)
- Player of the Year (Caleb Bellach 2023, Hayden Diekhans 2025)
- Defensive Player of the Year (Taylor England 2020, Derrius Collins 2022; Hayden Diekhans 2024 and 2025)
- Newcomer of the Year (Sindou Diallo 2020, Caleb Bellach 2022, Asa Williams 2023)
- Freshman of the Year (Bridger Larson 2021); 6th Man of the Year (Keeley Bake 2022; Camdyn LaRance 2024)
- 1st Team all-Conference (Taylor England 2020; Sindou Diallo, 2020, 2021, 2022; Caleb Bellach 2022, 2023, 2024; Asa Williams 2024; Michael Ure 2024; Hayden Diekhans 2025; Keeley Bake 2025)
- 2nd Team all-Conference (Chris O'Neill 2017, 2018, Taylor England 2019, 2021, 2022; Asa Williams 2023; Ifeanyi Okeke 2025)

The Orediggers women's basketball team is coached by Jeff Graham. The Orediggers went 29-5 in 2025-26, winning the Frontier Conference tournament for the first time since 1983.

=== Football ===
The Orediggers football team won the Frontier Conference Championship in ’36, ’39, ’70, ’72, ’79, ’83, ’92, ’96, ’97, ’04, '12, ’15, and ’16. They were runner-ups in the 1996 NAIA National Championship under coach Bob Green.

=== Golf ===
Sean Benson won Frontier Conference Men's Golf Championship in 2019. Sean Ramsbacher won the Men's Conference Championship in 2021, no tournament was held in 2020.

=== Track and field ===
Montana Tech began participating in the NAIA as the Orediggers track and field team started in spring 2021. Becca Richtman won the 3000m steeplechase at the 2021 NAIA Outdoor Championship. At the 2022 NAIA Indoor Championship, Richtman won the 1 mile and 3000m races, and was named meet MVP. The Orediggers finished 6th overall. At the 2022 NAIA Outdoor Championship, Richtman won the 10,000 meter race, took 2nd in the 5,000 meter, 2nd in the 3,000 meter, was named meet MVP, and named the NAIA National Women’s Track Athlete of the Year. Over her career Richtman won 10 All-American honors.

== Facilities ==
Montana Tech's facilities include:

Venue	Image	Sport(s)	Opened	Ref.
Alumni Coliseum		Football	1960s	
HPER Complex		Basketball	1977	
HPER Complex		Volleyball	1977	
