= Shawn Daniel =

American football coach

Playing career
- 1997–2000: Trinity Bible

Coaching career (HC unless noted)
- 2001: Trinity Bible (assistant)
- 2002–2006: St. Joseph HS (CA) (assistant)
- 2007–2011: SAGU (OL)
- 2012–2015: Midland (OL)
- 2016–2017: Lyon (OC)
- 2018–2021: Missouri Valley (OC)
- 2022: Sterling (OC)
- 2023–2025: Simpson (CA)

Head coaching record
- Overall: 0–19

Shawn Daniel is an American college football coach. He was the head football coach at Simpson University in Redding, California.

== Early life ==
Daniel is a native of Taft, California, where he attended Taft Union High School. He then went on to play college football at Trinity Bible College in Ellendale, North Dakota, where he graduated with a Bachelor of Arts in biblical studies in 2002.

== Coaching career ==
While at Trinity Bible, he served as an assistant on the football team during the 2001 season. He then became an assistant at St. Joseph High School in Santa Maria, California, from 2002 until 2006. Daniel then had a couple stints as the offensive line coach at Southwestern Assemblies of God University (SAGA)—now known as Nelson University— in Waxahachie, Texas and Midland University in Fremont, Nebraska. He then spent time as an offensive coordinator at Lyon College in Batesville, Arkansas, then at Missouri Valley College in Marshall, Missouri, then at Sterling College in Sterling, Kansas.

On December 6, 2022, Simpson University announced the addition of a football program, the first in the school's history. Soon after, Daniel was announced as the program's first ever head football coach. In his first two seasons at Simpson, Daniel accumulated a record of 0–19. On December 19, 2025, it was announced Daniel had resigned from his position at Simpson.

== Personal life ==
While coaching at SAGU, Daniel graduated with a Master of Arts in theological studies in 2011.

== Head coaching record ==
Year	Team	Overall	Conference	Standing	Bowl/playoffs	NAIA^{#}
Simpson Red Hawks (NAIA independent) (2024)
2024	Simpson	0–9				
Simpson Red Hawks (Frontier Conference) (2025)
2025	Simpson	0–10	0–6	7th (West)		
Simpson:		0–19	0–6			
Total:		0–19				
