= Randy Bandelow =

American football coach

Current position
- Title: Head coach
- Team: Rocky Mountain
- Conference: Frontier
- Record: 5–5

Biographical details
- Born: c. 1995 (age 30–31); Surprise, Arizona, U.S.
- Education: Grand Canyon University (2015); University of Mary (2018)

Coaching career (HC unless noted)
- 2014: Arizona Rattlers (intern)
- 2015–2016: Scottsdale (video operations)
- 2015–2016: Raymond S. Kellis HS (AZ) (DB)
- 2016–2018: Mary (GA/DB)
- 2016–2018: Mary (OLB)
- 2019–2021: Carroll (MT) (LB)
- 2022–2025: Carroll (MT) (DC/LB)
- 2026–present: Rocky Mountain

Head coaching record
- Overall: 5–5

Accomplishments and honors

Awards
- Frontier East Division Coach of the Year (2026)

Randy Bandelow (born c. 1995) is an American football coach. He is the head football coach for Rocky Mountain College, a position he has held since 2026.

== Coaching career ==
=== Early coaching career ===
Bandelow began his coaching career at the high school level at Kellis High School and later coached professionally in the Arena Football League with the Arizona Rattlers. He then moved into the collegiate ranks, serving as an assistant coach at Scottsdale Community College before joining the University of Mary as an outside linebackers coach and graduate assistant.

=== Carroll (MT) ===
Bandelow spent seven seasons at Carroll College in Helena, Montana. He coached linebackers and special teams for three seasons before being promoted to defensive coordinator prior to the 2022 season. In four seasons as defensive coordinator, his defenses produced three Frontier Conference Defensive Players of the Year in a four-year span, along with three NAIA All-Americans and 23 All-Conference selections. During his tenure, Carroll earned two NAIA National Championship Playoff appearances and a Frontier Conference championship.

=== Rocky Mountain ===
In December 2025, Bandelow was named the head football coach at Rocky Mountain College. Athletic director Kelly Perry cited Bandelow’s football knowledge, leadership, and fit within the college’s culture as key factors in his hiring. Upon accepting the position, Bandelow thanked Rocky Mountain College president Bob Wilmouth, Perry, and the search committee, and emphasized his commitment to building a program the community could be proud of.

== Head coaching record ==
Year	Team	Overall	Conference	Standing	Bowl/playoffs
Rocky Mountain Battlin' Bears (Frontier Conference) (2026–present)
2026	Rocky Mountain	5–5	4–2	T–2nd (East)	
Rocky Mountain:		5–5	4–2		
Total:		5–5			
