= Solo Taylor =

American football coach

Current position
- Title: Head coach
- Team: Eastern Oregon
- Conference: Frontier
- Record: 8–2

Biographical details
- Born: Rigby, Idaho, U.S.
- Education: Eastern Oregon University (B.S. 2020) (M.B.A. 2022)

Playing career
- 2016–2018: Boise State
- 2020–2022: Eastern Oregon
- Position: Linebacker

Coaching career (HC unless noted)
- 2022–2025: Eastern Oregon (DC/RC/DB)
- 2026–present: Eastern Oregon

Head coaching record
- Overall: 8–2

Solo Taylor is an American college football coach and former player. He is the head football coach for Eastern Oregon University, a position he has held since 2026. He was promoted to the position after previously serving as the Mountaineers’ defensive coordinator and recruiting coordinator.

== Early life ==
Taylor is a native of Rigby, Idaho. He attended Rigby High School, where he helped lead the program to three playoff appearances, including two state semifinal berths. As a senior in 2015, he recorded 112 tackles and was named First Team All-Idaho 4A .

== Playing career ==
=== Boise State ===
Taylor began his collegiate playing career at Boise State University, where he was a member of the Broncos football program from 2016 to 2018. He redshirted the 2016 season and was part of the 2017 team that won the Mountain West Conference championship and the Las Vegas Bowl.

=== Eastern Oregon ===
Taylor transferred to Eastern Oregon University, where he became one of the most decorated defensive players in program history. From 2020 to 2022, he earned First Team All-Frontier Conference honors three times and served as a team captain in each of his three seasons.

In 2020, Taylor helped lead the Mountaineers to a share of the Frontier Conference championship. He was a nominee for the Cliff Harris Award, presented annually to the top small-college defensive player in the nation. During his senior season in 2022, he appeared in all 11 games and recorded 69 total tackles, 2.5 sacks, one forced fumble, and one interception, earning First Team All-Conference honors for the third consecutive year. Taylor wore Eastern Oregon's legacy jersey number 7 during his final season.

== Coaching career ==
=== Eastern Oregon University ===
Taylor joined the Eastern Oregon football coaching staff in the spring of 2022 as defensive coordinator and recruiting coordinator, while also coaching the defensive backs. During his tenure as a coordinator, his defenses produced multiple All-Conference honorees, including First Team linebacker Jason Grant, as well as Honorable Mention selections Blaine Shaw and Jonas Waugh.

In 2024, Taylor's defensive unit produced a National Defender of the Week when Shaw earned the honor following a win over College of Idaho.

Following his time as defensive coordinator, Taylor was named head football coach at Eastern Oregon University in January 2026, becoming one of the youngest head coaches in the Frontier Conference.

== Head coaching record ==
Year	Team	Overall	Conference	Standing	Bowl/playoffs	Coaches^{#}
Eastern Oregon Mountaineers (Frontier Conference) (2026–present)
2026	Eastern Oregon	8–2	5–1	2nd (West)		
Eastern Oregon:		8–2	5–1			
Total:		8–2				
National championship Conference title Conference division title or championship game berth

== Personal life ==
Taylor earned a Bachelor of Science in Business Administration from Eastern Oregon University in 2020 and completed a Master of Business Administration in 2022. He is married to Malia Mills, an Eastern Oregon alumna and former Mountaineers volleyball player, who serves as the university's Assistant Athletic Director of Academic Success. He is the son of Norm and Linda Taylor and has one sister, Jet.
