= Brad Sherrod =

American football coach (born 1969)

Current position
- Title: Head coach
- Team: Morehouse
- Conference: SIAC
- Record: 0–0

Biographical details
- Born: November 6, 1969 (age 56); Monroe, North Carolina, U.S.
- Education: Duke University (1993)

Playing career
- 1989–1993: Duke
- Position: Linebacker

Coaching career (HC unless noted)
- 1994–1995: UMass (GA)
- 1996: East Tennessee State (LB)
- 1997–2005: Duke (LB)
- 2006: Duke (TE)
- 2007: Duke (RB)
- 2008–2009: Western Carolina (RB/LB)
- 2010–2012: Delaware (AHC/LB)
- 2013: Elon (DC)
- 2014–2015: Sam Houston State (co-DC/LB)
- 2016: Sam Houston State (DC/LB)
- 2017–2019: Wake Forest (OLB)
- 2020: Tennessee State (S)
- 2021–2023: UTSA (LB)
- 2024–2025: Texas Wesleyan
- 2026–present: Morehouse

Head coaching record
- Overall: 17–6
- Tournaments: 0–2 (NAIA playoffs)

Accomplishments and honors

Championships
- 1 SAC (2024)

Awards
- Second Team All-ACC (1993)

Brad Sherrod (born November 6, 1969) is an American college football coach. He is the head football coach for Morehouse College, a position he has held since 2026. He was previously the coach of Texas Wesleyan He was the second head coach since the program restarted in 2018.

Sherrod played college football for Duke as a linebacker. He earned Second Team All-Atlantic Coast Conference (ACC) honors. He began his coaching career as a graduate assistant for UMass. After coaching for East Tennessee State for one year he spent the next eleven as an assistant for his alma mater. He also coached for Western Carolina, Delaware, Wake Forest, Tennessee State, and UTSA. He served as a defensive coordinator for Elon and Sam Houston State.

== Head coaching record ==
Year	Team	Overall	Conference	Standing	Bowl/playoffs	NAIA/Coaches^{#}
Texas Wesleyan Rams (Sooner Athletic Conference) (2024–2025)
2024	Texas Wesleyan	10–1	8–0	1st	L NAIA Second Round	7
2025	Texas Wesleyan	7–5	7–1	T–1st	L NAIA First Round	24
Texas Wesleyan:		17–6	15–1			
Morehouse Maroon Tigers (Southern Intercollegiate Athletic Conference) (2026–present)
2026	Morehouse	0–0	0–0			
Morehouse:		0–0	0–0			
Total:		17–6				
National championship Conference title Conference division title or championship game berth
