= Phil Ockinga =

American football coach (born c. 1980)

Current position
- Title: Offensive coordinator & quarterbacks coach
- Team: Wisconsin–Eau Claire
- Conference: WIAC

Biographical details
- Born: c. 1980 (age 45–46); Hastings, Nebraska, U.S.
- Education: Hastings College (2002); Fort Hays State University (2005)

Playing career
- 1998: Wyoming
- 1999–2001: Hastings

Coaching career (HC unless noted)
- 2002–2003: Hastings (GA)
- 2004: Fort Hays State (RB)
- 2005: Fort Hays State (DL)
- 2006–2007: Fort Hays State (PGC/WR/RC)
- 2008: Fort Hays State (PGC/FB/TE/RC)
- 2009-2013: FIU (DB/LB)
- 2014: Hutchinson (OC/ST/RB/TE/RC)
- 2015: Western Illinois (WR/RC)
- 2016–2017: South Dakota (ST/RB)
- 2018: South Dakota (ST/WR/RC)
- 2019–2021: South Dakota (AHC/ST/WR/RC)
- 2022–2025: Peru State
- 2026–present: Wisconsin–Eau Claire (OC/QB)

Administrative career (AD unless noted)
- 2012: FIU (DPP)

Head coaching record
- Overall: 24–19

Phillip Ockinga (born c. 1980) is an American college football coach. He is the offensive coordinator and quarterbacks coach for the University of Wisconsin–Eau Claire, positions he has held since 2026. Before that, he was the head football coach for Peru State College, a position he held from 2022 to 2025. He also coached for Hastings, Fort Hays State, FIU, Hutchinson, Western Illinois, and South Dakota. He played college football for Wyoming and Hastings.

== Head coaching record ==
Year	Team	Overall	Conference	Standing	Bowl/playoffs
Peru State Bobcats (Heart of America Athletic Conference) (2022–2025)
2022	Peru State	6–5	4–1	2nd (North)	
2023	Peru State	5–6	3–2	T–2nd (North)	
2024	Peru State	7–3	5–2	3rd (North)	
2025	Peru State	6–5	3–3	T–3rd (North)	
Peru State:		24–19	15–8		
Total:		24–19			
