= Doris Brougham =

American-born Taiwanese educator and missionary (1926–2024)

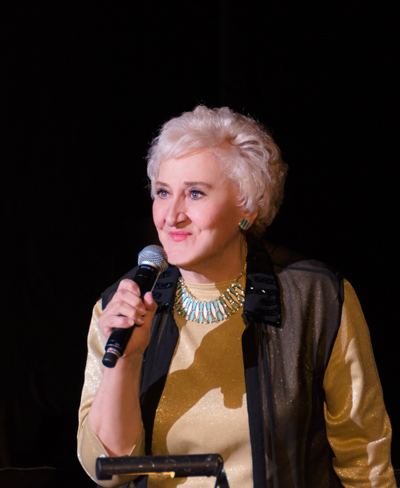
- Brougham in 2014
- Born: 5 August 1926; Seattle, Washington, U.S.
- Died: 6 August 2024 (aged 98); Tamsui, New Taipei City, Taiwan
- Education: University of Washington (BA); Seattle Pacific University
- Occupation: Educator
- Organizations: Studio Classroom, Heavenly Melody, Overseas Radio & Television, Inc.

Doris Marie Brougham (Chinese: 彭蒙惠; 5 August 1926 – 6 August 2024) was an American and Taiwanese educator and Christian missionary. She founded Studio Classroom, an English teaching program, in 1962. Brougham also founded Heavenly Melody, the first Chinese Christian choir composing original music, and Overseas Radio & Television, Inc., a media company.

== Biography ==
Born in Seattle on 5 August 1926, to a mechanic and homemaker, Brougham made up her mind at age 11 to help people in the Far East. Although she was offered a full scholarship to study at the Eastman School of Music, Brougham declined and instead enrolled at the Simpson Bible Institute to prepare for missionary work. In 1948, after graduating from the University of Washington with a B.A. in Far East Studies, she traveled to China by ship. After witnessing the Chinese Civil War, Brougham moved to Hong Kong in 1949, then to Taiwan in 1951, returning to the United States in 1953 to graduate from Seattle Pacific College.

Brougham worked with the Atayal tribe in Hualien County from 1951 to 1957, where she taught English and music, and became known by the Atayal name Libeck, meaning lily of the valley. Shortly after, she started the first Christian radio broadcast in Taiwan. Believing media to be the most effective medium to influence people, she founded Overseas Radio & Television, Inc. in 1960. She saw a great need for English on the island, so in 1962, she founded Studio Classroom, an English teaching radio program accompanied by a single page of English lessons. The program was extremely popular, and later expanded into three English teaching programs with accompanying magazines: Studio Classroom, Let’s Talk in English (from 1981), and Advanced.

Besides English, Brougham, a lifelong musician and brass instrumentalist specializing in the trumpet, the French horn, and the trombone, produced Taiwan's first Christian TV program, Heavenly Melody, which aired in 1963. The show’s choir became the Heavenly Melody Singers, a professional choir that has held concerts in 34 countries and continue to share their music globally.

A lifelong educator, Brougham received numerous awards, including the Order of Brilliant Star, Taiwan’s highest non-military honor in 2002, for her contributions to the development of Taiwan. She was one of the first foreigners to receive permanent resident status on the island, and became a Taiwanese citizen in May 2023. Brougham’s hometown, Seattle, declared 2 April 2014, as Doris Brougham Day in recognition of her exemplary work.

Brougham died of multiple organ dysfunction syndrome at Mackay Memorial Hospital's Tamsui Branch on 6 August 2024, at the age of 98. In September 2024, the William Lai administration posthumously awarded Brougham a presidential citation.

== Awards ==
- 25th Taipei Culture Award (2021)
- Outstanding Women Award by the National Women’s League of the R.O.C. (2021)
- Honorary Citizen by Tainan City Government (2017)
- The city of Seattle in the U.S. state of Washington declared 2 April as Doris Brougham Day (2014)
- The Washington State Senate passed a senate resolution to honor Doris M. Brougham for her lifelong dedication to Taiwan and enhancement of good bilateral relations between Washington State and Taiwan (2014)
- Recipient of the National Religious Broadcasters (NRB) International Individual Achievement Award (2011)
- Recipient of the NRB Milestone Award (2011)
- Lifetime Achievement Award, Asian Publishing Awards (2010)
- Love of Lives Literary Composition Award from the Chou, Ta-Kuan Foundation (2010)
- Hualien County Honorable Citizen Award (2008)
- Recipient Schweitzer Award for English Teaching from the King Car Education Foundation (2004)
- Recipient of the Order of the Brilliant Star with Violet Grand Cordon awarded by Taiwan’s President Chen Shui-bian (2002)
- Recipient of the Individual Achievement in International Broadcasting, International
- Information Ministry Award by the National Religious Broadcasters (NRB) (2001)
- Outstanding Performance by a Foreign Missionary from ROC’s Ministry of Interior (1997)
- Honorable Citizen Award from the Mayor of Taipei (1996)
- Golden Tripod Award for Outstanding Contribution to Education in the R.O.C. (1989)
- Integrity and Excellence in Broadcasting Award (Washington, DC) (1988)
- NRB International Award, USA (1986)
- R.O.C. Special Teacher’s Award (Confucius Award) (1984)
- R.O.C. Good People—Good Deeds Award (1982)
- Hosted Around the World in English teaching television series (1977)
- Golden Bell Award in Educational Radio Programs (1969)

== Education ==
- Doctor of Christian Ministries (Honorary), Belhaven College, Jackson, Mississippi (2009)
- Doctor of Humane Letters (L.H.D.) Seattle Pacific University, Seattle, (1991)
- Doctor of Human Letters (L.H.D.) Azusa Pacific University, Los Angeles (1988)
- Doctor of Laws (L.L.D.) Pacific States University, Los Angeles (1986)
- M.A. Communications, Pacific Western University, Los Angeles, (1986)
- A 1953 alumna of Seattle Pacific College
- B.A. in Far East Studies, University of Washington, Seattle, Washington (1947–48)
- Simpson Bible College, Seattle, Washington, USA, BA in Christian Education
