= Todd Reed (designer) =

American fine jewelry designer (born 1973)

Todd Reed (born April 16, 1973) is an American fine jewelry designer best known for his use of rough diamonds. Reed's designs are hand-fabricated in Boulder, Colorado using recycled metals.

== Career ==
Before making jewelry, Reed experimented with clothing, furniture, sculpture, painting and leatherwork. In 1992 Reed began working for leathersmith Eric Hodges, fabricating the metal conchos for leather bags. Soon after, Reed was introduced to rough diamonds by collector Jack Greenspan. Reed started teaching himself how to create jewelry from metal using colored gemstones. Even though Reed found a passion for creating jewelry, he enrolled in Western Culinary Institute in Portland. While attending school he sold his designs at local markets.

== Todd Reed (company) ==
After completing school, he moved back to Colorado and began selling jewelry to galleries. He established his company at the age of 17. As his small business grew he began incorporating raw diamonds into his work. Reed was among the first to use raw diamonds in modern jewelry, creating a new category in fine jewelry.

In 2010 Reed opened his first showroom in Boulder, Colorado. His second showroom opened in Venice, CA in September 2014. Reed's designs are also sold in more than 70 jewelry stores nationwide.

=== Sustainable material ===
Reed uses raw stones, 18K and 22K yellow gold, sterling silver, rose gold and palladium. He uses naturally colored and untreated diamonds for his jewelry. The material he uses is responsibly sourced. Moreover, he uses natural resources and ensures fair treatment for the involved workers.

According to his responsibility mentality, he grows the brands philanthropic engagement and support of local businesses. He contributes to several philanthropic organizations and provides mentorship programs at local metalsmithing schools.

== Awards ==
- 2009 Veranda Art of Design Award in the Personal Luxury category
- 2011 "Best in Show" in the AGTA Spectrum Awards
- 2012 "Best in Show" in the AGTA Spectrum Awards
- 2012 JCK Jeweler's Choice Award in the Palladium Jewelry category
- 2013 Centurion Design Award in Contemporary Metals category
