= Fran Johnson (American football) =

American football coach (born c. 1983)

Current position
- Title: Head coach
- Team: Texas Wesleyan
- Conference: SAC
- Record: 0–0

Biographical details
- Born: c. 1983 (age 42–43)
- Education: Benedictine College (2005, 2007)

Playing career
- 2001–2004: Benedictine (KS)
- Position: Quarterback

Coaching career (HC unless noted)
- 2005–2006: Benedictine (KS) (assistant)
- 2007–2008: Benedictine (KS) (QB)
- 2009: Benedictine (KS) (interim OC/QB)
- 2010–2020: Benedictine (KS) (OC/QB/RC)
- 2021–2025: Texas Wesleyan (OC)
- 2026–present: Texas Wesleyan

Head coaching record
- Overall: 0–0

Accomplishments and honors

Awards
- HAAC Offensive Player of the Year (2004)

Fran Johnson (born c. 1983) is an American college football coach. He is the head football coach for Texas Wesleyan University, a position he has held since 2026.

Johnson was an assistant coach at his alma mater, Benedictine (KS), from 2005 to 2020 after serving as a record-setting quarterback from 2001 to 2004. Johnson was an AFCA NAIA Assistant Coach of the Year finalist in 2021 while at Benedictine.

== Head coaching record ==
| Year | Team | Overall | Conference | Standing | Bowl/playoffs |
|---|---|---|---|---|---|
Texas Wesleyan Rams (Sooner Athletic Conference) (2026–present)
| 2026 | Texas Wesleyan | 0–0 | 0–0 | | |
| Texas Wesleyan: | | 0–0 | 0–0 | | |
| Total: | | 0–0 | | | |
