= Todd Reed (author) =

American writer and businessman

- Education: Bachelor of Science in Business
- Alma mater: Rocky Mountain College
- Occupations: Author, consultant, professional speaker
- Website: www.coachtoddreed.com

Todd R. Reed is an author, consultant and professional speaker focused in the fields of communication and relationships.

== Career ==
Reed is a Certified Professional Coach, a two-time award-winning Television Broadcaster of the Year and two-time award-winning Radio Broadcaster of the year.

He is the author of the bestseller, Conversation is Sexy. His newest book, Revolutionize Your Relationships, provides communication secrets on how to succeed at work and at home.

Reed has been a guest on CBS, NBC and FOX affiliates. He has appeared on over 75 radio shows coast-to-coast including Voice of America. He has also been featured as a relationship expert in national and international publications including Woman's World, First for Women, Men's Health Singapore, Knoxville News Sentinel, and the Bangor Daily News and has been profiled in Life in Chenal.

== Awards ==
- Two-time Montana State Television Broadcaster of the Year (Montana Broadcasters Association)
- Two-time Montana State Radio Broadcaster of the Year (Montana Broadcasters Association)
- First place, Television Public Service Announcement/Campaign Award (with Scott Ashleman, Montana Broadcasters Association)
- Excellence in Journalism Award (Society of Professional Journalists, Pacific Northwest)

== Books ==
- Reed, Todd (2011). Conversation is Sexy: Communicate on a Higher Level, Connect on a Deeper Emotional Level. Triple R Publishing. pp. 192 pages. ISBN 978-0615408606.
- Reed, Todd (2013). Revolutionize Your Relationships: Communication Secrets on How to Succeed at Work and at Home. CreateSpace Independent Publishing. pp. 130 pages. ISBN 978-1492975366.
