= Alumni Coliseum (Butte) =

College football stadium in Butte, Montana

Coordinates: 46.011°N 112.560°W

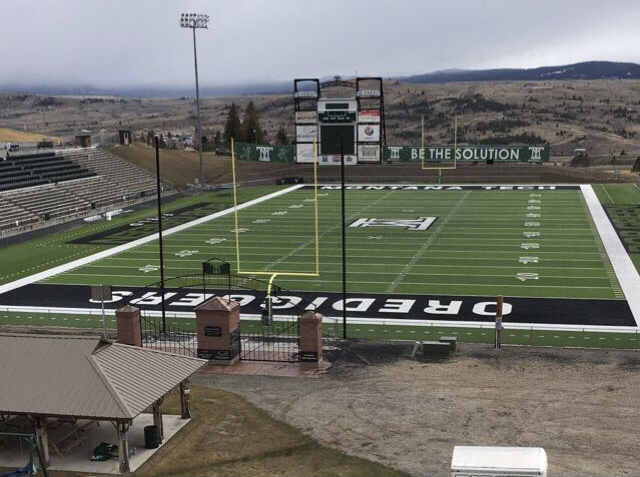
View from north of Bob Green Field at Alumni Coliseum in Butte, Montana in 2017

Location in the United States

Alumni Coliseum, officially Bob Green Field at Alumni Coliseum, is a 2,000-seat college football stadium in the northwestern United States, located at the campus of Montana Technological University in Butte, Montana. It is the home of the NAIA Montana Tech Orediggers.

In 2013, a new artificial turf field was installed and named after legendary Montana Tech football coach Bob Green. The playing field is aligned north-northeast to south-southwest, at an approximate elevation of 5,700 feet (1,735 m) above sea level.

The stadium is the former home of the Butte Copper Kings (now Grand Junction Jackalopes) Pioneer League baseball franchise. The Copper Kings shared the stadium with Montana Tech until their demise, as well as the local American Legion baseball team until a new field was built for that specific purpose. The grandstands that were used for baseball have been removed and replaced with expansions to the Montana Tech campus.
