= Simpson University =

Private university in Redding, California, U.S.

Coordinates: 40.613°N 122.333°W

- Former names: Simpson Bible Institute (1921–1955); Simpson Bible College (1955–1971); Simpson College (1971–2004)
- Motto: Gateway to World Service
- Type: Private liberal arts college
- Established: 1921
- Religious affiliation: Christian and Missionary Alliance
- Endowment: $5.87 million (2016)
- President: Norman Hall
- Provost: John Ayabe
- Faculty: 128 (fall 2019)
- Students: 854 (fall 2019)
- Undergraduates: 702 (fall 2019)
- Postgraduates: 152 (fall 2019)
- Location: Redding, California, United States
- Campus: Suburban
- Colors: Red & Black
- Nickname: Red Hawks
- Sporting affiliations: NAIA – Cal Pac (primary); NAIA - Frontier Conference (football); NAIA – CCC (wrestling)
- Website: www.simpsonu.edu

Simpson University is a private Evangelical Christian liberal arts college in Redding, California. Originally founded in 1921 in Seattle as Simpson Bible Institute, the institution relocated to San Francisco in 1955 and then to Redding in 1989. It is affiliated with the Christian and Missionary Alliance.

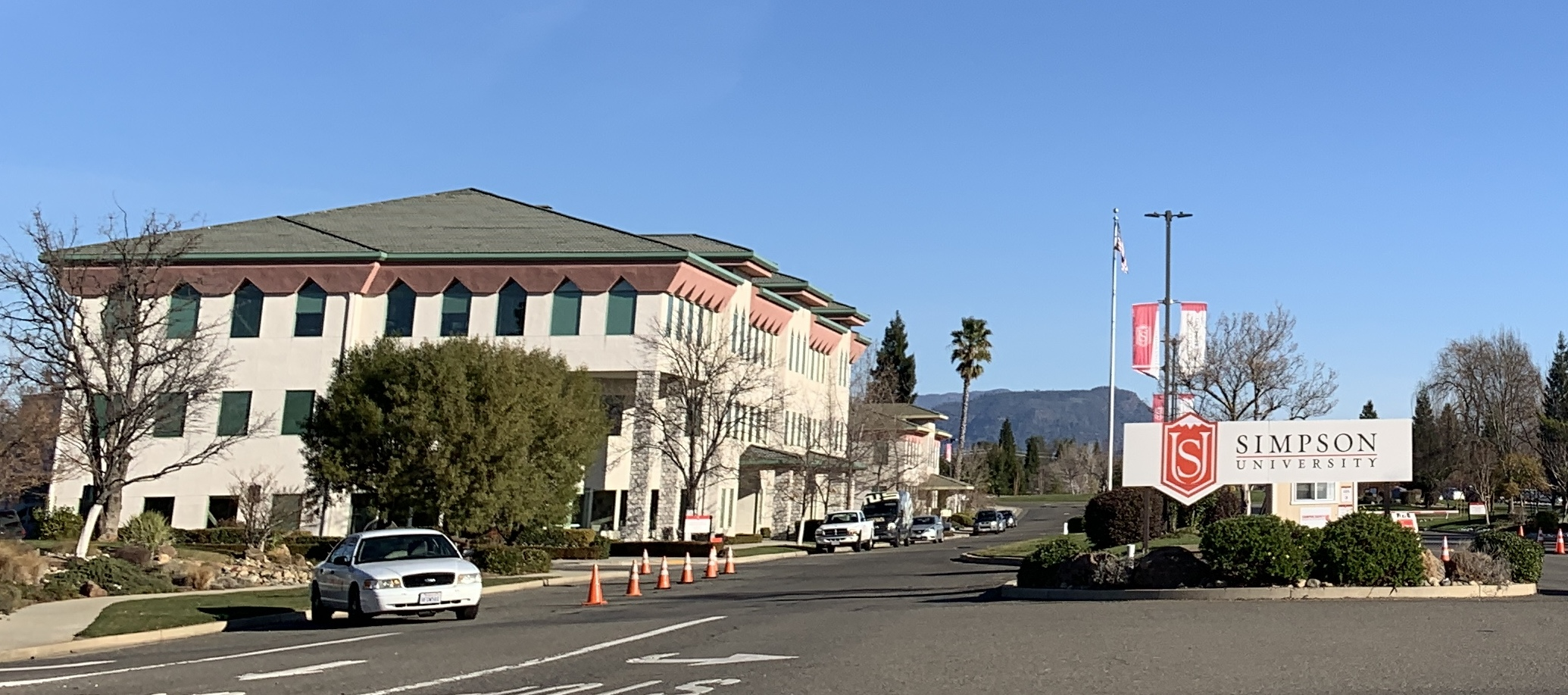
Entrance to Simpson University

== History ==
Simpson College, named after Albert Benjamin Simpson, a pioneer of the Bible institute movement and founder of The Christian and Missionary Alliance denomination, was established in 1921. Created by W.W. Newberry with the intent of promoting spiritual growth and Christian service in its students, the school initially only offered two-year programs. By 1945 it had expanded its offering and also became the official western regional school of The Christian and Missionary Alliance. By 1971 the college was large enough to offer in-depth liberal arts programs, professional degrees, and biblical courses. Another historic milestone was reached in 1989 when Simpson relocated to its current location in Redding and began building a new campus. In 2004, Simpson College became Simpson University.

The institution was granted an exception to Title IX in 2014, allowing Simpson to legally maintain constitutionally protected and biblically-based views and practices regarding marriage and sexuality.

== Academics ==
Simpson offers many degrees at both the undergraduate and graduate level. In additional to its School of Traditional Undergraduate Studies, it is also home to the Betty M. Dean School of Nursing, which is accredited by the Commission on Collegiate Nursing Education; the School of Education; School of Adult Studies (ASPIRE degree-completion program); School of Graduate Professional Studies; and A.W. Tozer Theological Seminary.

== Athletics ==
The Simpson athletic teams are called the Red Hawks. The institution is a member of the National Association of Intercollegiate Athletics (NAIA), primarily competing in the California Pacific Conference (Cal Pac) for most of its sports since the 1996–97 academic year; while its men's and women's wrestling teams compete in the Cascade Collegiate Conference (CCC), the swimming & diving teams compete in the Pacific Collegiate Swim Conference (PCSC), and the football team competes in the Frontier Conference. They also previously competed as a member of the National Christian College Athletic Association (NCCAA), primarily competing as an independent in the West Region of the Division I level from 1991–92 to 2014–15. The athletic department offers multiple sports programs for both men and women.

Simpson competes in 19 intercollegiate varsity sports: Men's sports include baseball, basketball, cross country, golf, soccer, swimming & diving, track & field, volleyball and wrestling; while women's sports include basketball, cross country, golf, soccer, softball, swimming & diving, track & field, volleyball and wrestling; and co-ed sports include cheerleading. Club sports include co-ed bass fishing. Simpson added football in 2024 and announced plans to launch women's flag football in 2026.

=== Mascot ===
Originally, while still located in San Francisco, the school's athletes were the Knights. After the school moved to Redding, there was a conflict with nearby Shasta College, who were also the Knights. Simpson remained the Knights for the first year in Redding, and in 1990 adopted Vanguard as its mascot. In the fall of 2004, Simpson again changed its mascot to a Red Hawk.

=== Awards ===
Between 1999 and 2017, Simpson has won the Cal Pac Sportsmanship award, which is chosen by the conference's coaches and administrators, seven times. The women's softball team also won the school's first conference title, male or female, in the 2011 Cal Pac Conference Championship. The institution has also had three women's teams make it to the NCCAA National Championship, including volleyball in 1999, basketball in 2002, and a softball national championship in 2015.

== Notable alumni ==
- Doris Brougham - American educator, missionary, and founder of ORTV
- Kathryn Kuhlman - Faith healer and evangelist
- Brandon Leake - Poet and winner of America's Got Talent
- Archie E. Mitchell - Missionary who disappeared during the Vietnam war, also part of the Fu-Go balloon bomb incident.
- Yemi Mobolade- Politician and Businessman, current mayor of Colorado Springs
- The Myriad - Band formed while members were attending Simpson
