= University of Montana Western =

Public college in Dillon, Montana

The University of Montana Western
- Former name: List: Montana State Normal School (1893–1903); Montana State Normal College (1903–1931); Montana State Teachers College (1931–1949); Western Montana College of Education (1949–1965); Western Montana College (1965–1988)* Western Montana College of The University of Montana (1988–2001)
- Type: Public college
- Established: 1893; 133 years ago
- Parent institution: University of Montana
- Academic affiliations: Space-grant
- Chancellor: Estee Aiken
- Provost: Eric Wright (Interim)
- Students: 1,221
- Location: Dillon, Montana, U.S. 45°12′30″N 112°38′18″W
- Campus: Rural
- Colors: Red, White & Black
- Nickname: Bulldogs
- Sporting affiliations: NAIA – Frontier
- Mascot: Baxter the Bulldog
- Website: umwestern.edu
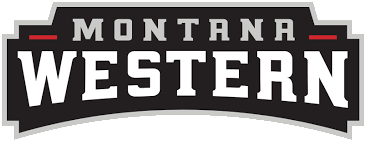

The University of Montana Western (UMW, Montana Western) is a public college in Dillon, Montana, United States. It is affiliated with the University of Montana and part of the Montana University System. It was founded in 1893 as "Montana State Normal School" and was also the "Western Montana College of the University of Montana" before becoming part of the Montana University System in 2000. Enrollment of full-time, degree seeking students as of Fall 2018 was 1,221 students.

== History ==
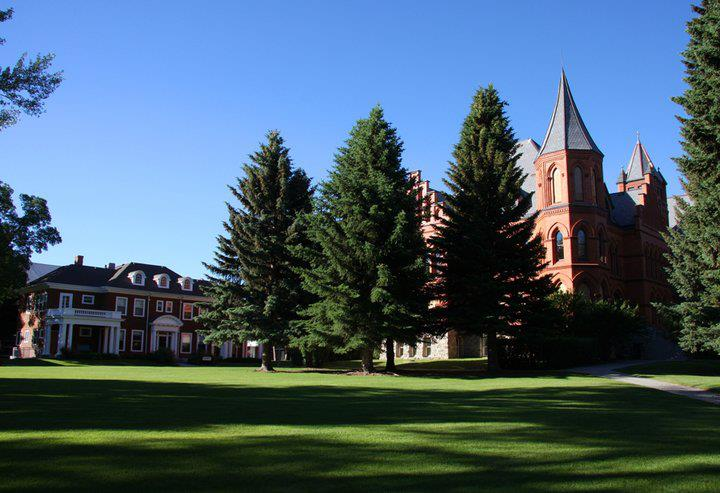
Montana Western campus

The college was founded as the Montana State Normal School in 1893 to train teachers according to a model used by other states. Education was considered highly important for the state. The first term of the Montana State Normal School began on September 6, 1897, with courses in elementary education for all grades below high school which took two years to complete, a one-year professional course for all teachers with two years of prior experience, an English-Scientific course which gave students a four-year diploma, a four-year Latin course, and a graduate course.

Academics at the college expanded with increased programs and had a four-year curriculum; the addition of other subjects and departments led to its being renamed as Western Montana College. It became part of the Montana University System in 2000 and its name was changed to University of Montana Western.

== Student life ==
Undergraduate demographics as of Fall 2023
Race and ethnicity	Total
White	81%
American Indian/Alaska Native	6%
Two or more races	5%
Hispanic	4%
Asian	1%
Black	1%
Native Hawaiian/Pacific Islander	1%
Unknown	1%
Economic diversity
Low-income (Note: The percentage of students who received an income-based federal Pell grant intended for low-income students.)	38%
Affluent (Note: The percentage of students who are a part of the American middle class at the bare minimum.)	62%

== Athletics ==
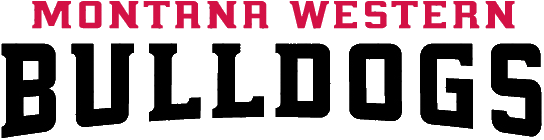
Montana Western athletics wordmark

The Montana–Western (UMW) athletic teams are called the Bulldogs. The college is a member of the National Association of Intercollegiate Athletics (NAIA), primarily competing in the Frontier Conference since the 1933–34 academic year.

Montana–Western competes in 12 intercollegiate varsity sports: Men's sports include basketball, cross country, football, rodeo and track & field (indoor and outdoor); while women's sports include basketball, cross country, rodeo, track & field (indoor and outdoor) and volleyball.

== Notable alumni ==
- Brandon Brown, professional basketball player
- Jeff Choate, college football coach
