= Rocky Mountain College =

Private college in Billings, Montana, US

Coordinates: 45.796386°N 108.554788°W

- Former names: Montana Collegiate Institute (1878–1883); College of Montana (1883–1916); Intermountain Union College (1923–1935); Billings Polytechnic Institute (1908–1947)
- Type: Private college
- Established: 1878; 148 years ago
- Religious affiliation: United Methodist Church, Presbyterian Church (USA), United Church of Christ
- Academic affiliations: Space-grant
- Endowment: $49.3 million (2025)
- President: Robert Wilmouth
- Students: 991 (fall 2023)
- Undergraduates: 794 (fall 2023)
- Postgraduates: 197 (fall 2023)
- Location: Billings, Montana, United States
- Campus: Suburban, 60 acres (24 ha)
- Colors: Forest Green and Vegas Gold
- Nickname: Battlin' Bears
- Sporting affiliations: NAIA – Frontier
- Website: www.rocky.edu

Rocky Mountain College (Rocky or RMC) is a private college in Billings, Montana, United States. As of fall 2025, the college had a total enrollment of 1,032 students. RMC is affiliated with the United Methodist Church, the Presbyterian Church (USA), and the United Church of Christ.

== History ==
Rocky Mountain College traces its history to the 1878 founding of the Montana Collegiate Institute in Deer Lodge, Montana. Renamed the College of Montana, that institution closed in 1916, and in 1923 its assets and those of Montana Wesleyan College were incorporated into Intermountain Union College (IUC) in Helena. A former president of the College of Montana, Lewis Eaton, founded the Billings Polytechnic Institute (BPI) in 1908 as Billings's first post-secondary institution. RMC remains on Poly Drive, which leads to campus from downtown Billings. Intermountain Union relocated to the Billings Polytechnic campus after a series of earthquakes destroyed its Helena buildings in 1935. IUC merged with BPI in 1947, when students named their own school to create today's Rocky Mountain College.

Since the merger of Intermountain Union College and Billings Polytechnic Institute, Rocky Mountain College has had the following presidents:

- William D. Copeland, 1947–1951
- Herbert W Hines, 1951–1958
- Philip M. Widenhouse, 1958–1966
- Lawrence F. Small, 1966–1975
- Bruce T. Alton, 1975–1986
- James J. Rittenkamp Jr., 1986–1987
- Arthur H. DeRosier Jr., 1987–2002
- Thomas R. Oates, 2002–2005
- Michael R. Mace, 2005–2012
- Robert Wilmouth, 2012–present

== Academics ==
Rocky Mountain College offers undergraduate, pre-professional, and graduate programs grounded in a liberal arts curriculum. The college offers 47 undergraduate majors and concentrations and 38 minors across more than 20 disciplines. Areas of study include business and accounting, communication and the arts, education, government and public policy, health sciences, aviation, mathematics and technology, natural sciences, environmental studies, animal science, and equine studies.

Undergraduate programs include Bachelor of Arts and Bachelor of Science degrees, as well as pre-professional and pre-health science options. The college's undergraduate core curriculum is based in the liberal arts and emphasizes communication, critical thinking, creative expression, leadership, and professional development.

Rocky Mountain College offers several graduate and professional degree programs, including the Master of Accountancy, Master of Educational Leadership, Master of Physician Assistant Studies, and Doctor of Occupational Therapy. The college also offers an accelerated program through which students may combine undergraduate study in business management with the Master of Accountancy degree.

The Master of Physician Assistant Studies program prepares students for professional practice as physician assistants and emphasizes service to rural and underserved communities in the Intermountain West. The program is accredited by the Accreditation Review Commission on Education for the Physician Assistant (ARC-PA). The Doctor of Occupational Therapy program provides professional doctoral education in occupational therapy.

Rocky Mountain College is institutionally accredited by the Northwest Commission on Colleges and Universities (NWCCU). The college was first accredited in 1949 and continues to hold institutional accreditation through the commission.

Several academic programs also hold specialized accreditation or approval. The Aeronautical Science and Aviation Management programs are accredited by the Aviation Accreditation Board International (AABI); the Physician Assistant Studies program is accredited by the Accreditation Review Commission on Education for the Physician Assistant (ARC-PA); and the Doctor of Occupational Therapy program is accredited by the Accreditation Council for Occupational Therapy Education. The college's teacher education programs are approved by the Montana Office of Public Instruction.

== Athletics ==
RMC sponsors 15 intercollegiate varsity sports. Men's sports include basketball, cross country, football, golf, soccer, ski racing, and track and field; women's sports include basketball, cross country, golf, soccer, ski racing, track and field, and volleyball; and the college also sponsors co-ed cheerleading.

Most of Rocky Mountain's varsity teams compete in the Frontier Conference of the National Association of Intercollegiate Athletics (NAIA), including basketball, cross country, football, golf, track and field, and volleyball. The men's and women's soccer teams compete as associate members of the Cascade Collegiate Conference. The men's and women's ski racing teams compete in the United States Collegiate Ski and Snowboard Association (USCSA), participating in USCSA conference and Western Region competition before advancing to the national championships.

=== Men's Basketball ===
In 2014, the Battlin' Bears men's basketball team won the Frontier Conference championship and three teammates were named to the NAIA All-America team. In 2009, the Battlin' Bears men's basketball team won the NAIA Division I National Championship, the school's first NAIA title.

=== Men's Soccer ===
The Battlin' Bears men's soccer team has made eight appearances in the NAIA Men's Soccer National Championship, advancing to the national quarterfinals in 2015 and 2018. By 2018, Rocky Mountain had made six national tournament appearances.

In 2015, Rocky Mountain won the Cascade Collegiate Conference regular-season championship, finished 17–3–4, and was ranked No. 7 nationally in the final NAIA Men's Soccer Coaches' Top 25 Poll.

Rocky Mountain won the Cascade Collegiate Conference tournament championship in 2018 and advanced to the quarterfinals of the NAIA national tournament. The Battlin' Bears defeated Hastings 3–2 in the opening round and Vanguard 1–0 in the second round before losing 1–0 to Central Methodist in the quarterfinals.

Rocky Mountain returned to the NAIA national tournament in the 2020–21 season after finishing Cascade Collegiate Conference play undefeated at 8–0. That appearance was the program's seventh. Rocky returned to the national tournament again in 2025, making its eighth appearance in program history.

=== Skiing ===
The Battlin' Bears women's ski team, which competes in the United States Collegiate Ski and Snowboard Association (USCSA), won a national championship in 2014. The men's ski team won RMC's first national sports championship in 2005, continuing to take national championships again in 2007, 2011, 2016, 2017, 2018, and 2020.

== Notable alumni and faculty ==
- Valeen Tippetts Avery, biographer and historian
- Bob Bees, American football player
- Bill Bowers, mime and actor
- Lane Chandler, actor
- Jason Earles, actor
- Arlo Guthrie, folksinger (did not graduate)
- Larry R. Heather, frequent Christian Heritage Party of Canada candidate
- Chris Horn, former Carolina Panthers wide receiver
- J. Timothy Hunt, journalist and author
- Jill McLain, Miss Montana USA 2005
- Kasey Peters, American football player
- Todd Reed, author, consultant and professional speaker
- Sidney Runyan Thomas, United States federal appellate judge, taught at RMC from 1982 to 1995
- Michal Wisniowski, artist
