= Frontier Conference =

College athletic conference in the United States

- Formerly: Montana Small College Conference (1934–1936); Montana Collegiate Conference (1936–1966)
- Association: NAIA
- Founded: 1934; 92 years ago
- Commissioner: Dr. Scott Crawford
- Sports fielded: 16; men's: 8; women's: 8
- No. of teams: 12 (11 in 2027)
- Headquarters: Whitefish, Montana
- Region: Western and Midwestern United States
- Website: fcsports.org

Locations
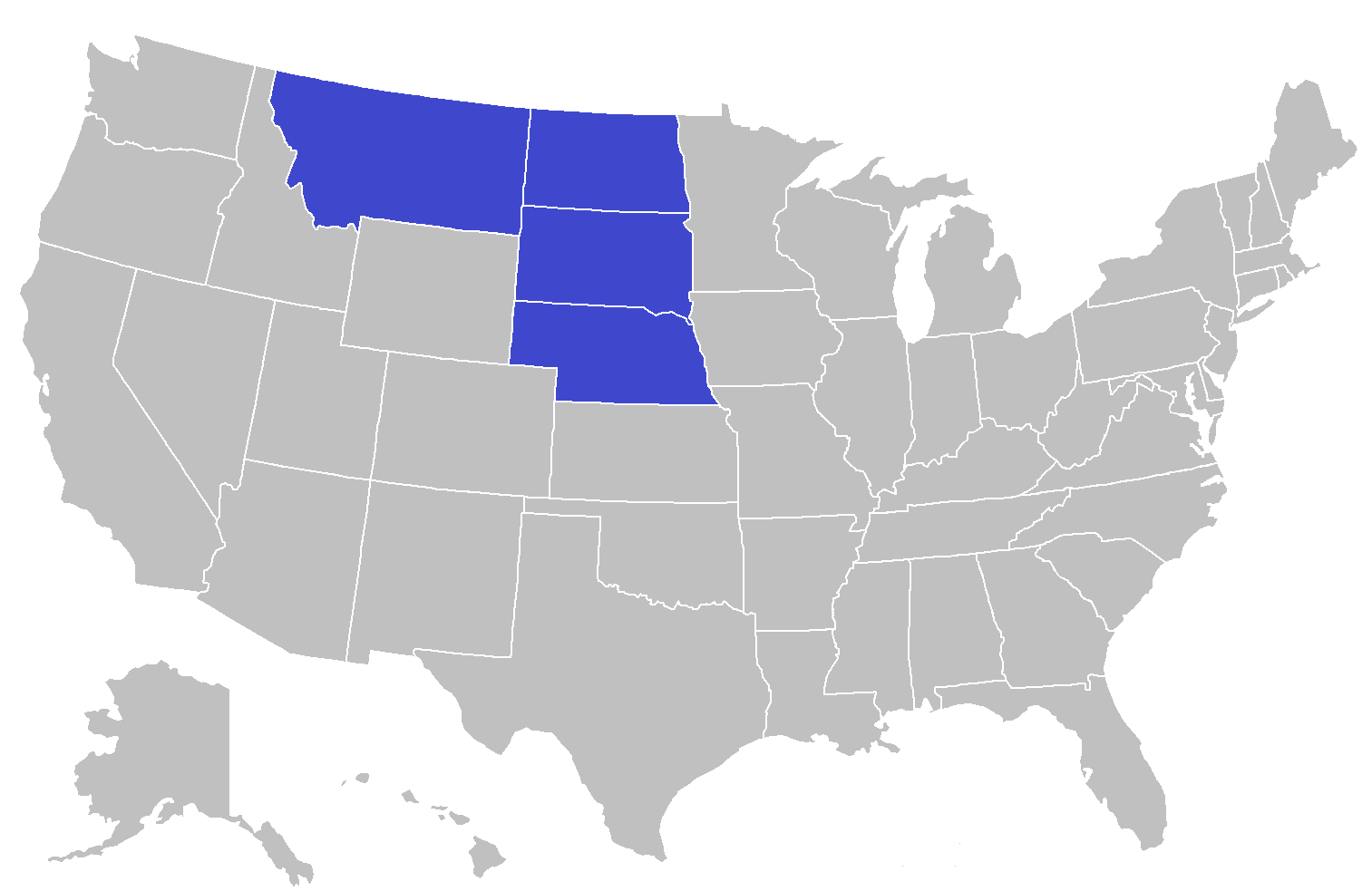

The Frontier Conference is a college athletic conference affiliated with the National Association of Intercollegiate Athletics (NAIA). The conference was founded in 1934. Member institutions are located in the U.S. states of Montana, Nebraska, North Dakota and South Dakota, with associate members in the states of Arizona, Idaho, and Oregon.

The Frontier Conference sponsors athletic competition in men's and women's basketball, men's and women's cross country, men's football, men's and women's indoor and outdoor track and field, and women's volleyball.

== History ==
The Montana Small College Conference (MSCC) was established in 1934 by the five smaller schools (Montana Technological University, the University of Montana Western, Montana State University–Northern, Intermountain Union College and Billings Polytechnic Institute) in the state. The MSCC was renamed as the Montana Collegiate Conference (MCC) in 1936, with the additions of Montana State University Billings and Carroll College joining. The merger of Intermountain Union and Billings Poly to become Rocky Mountain College occurred in 1947. After nearly three decades, the conference reestablished itself under its current moniker in November 1966, containing the same six schools until 1974. The University of Providence (then the College of Great Falls) joined that year, however would only stay for a decade. MSU Billings left for the first incarnation of the Great Northwest Athletic Conference in 1988, leaving the Frontier at five members for another decade. The conference opened up outside of Montana for the first time in 1998, with schools from Idaho (Lewis–Clark State College) and Utah (Westminster College) joining. Great Falls rejoined in 1999. Dickinson State University joined in 2012, only to leave in 2014 to join the North Star Athletic Association (NSAA). Westminster (Utah) left for the National Collegiate Athletic Association (NCAA) Division II ranks and rejoined the Rocky Mountain Athletic Conference (RMAC) in 2015. Lewis–Clark State left for the Cascade Collegiate Conference as a full member in 2020.

=== Recent changes ===
On September 8, 2022, Arizona Christian University received an invitation to join the conference as an associate member for football, beginning the 2023 fall season of the 2023–24 academic year.

On December 12, 2023, the Frontier Conference had offered an invitation to former member Dickinson State University; while on May 21, 2024, it extended additional invitations to Bellevue University, Dakota State University, Mayville State University and Valley City State University. All five schools would come from the North Star Athletic Association, which announced it would be disbanding that year. This was followed up with an invitation to Bismarck State College, an institution transitioning to the NAIA from the junior college ranks, on October 24, 2024. All of these invitations were effective beginning the 2025–26 academic year.

On May 30, 2024, Simpson University accepted an invitation to join the conference as an associate member for football, beginning the 2025 fall season of the 2025–26 academic year.

=== Chronological timeline ===
Frontier Conference
Location of Frontier members: current, departing
- 1934 – The Frontier Conference was founded as the Montana Small College Conference (MSCC). Charter members included the Billings Polytechnic Institute, Intermountain Union College, Montana State Normal College (now the University of Montana Western), Montana State School of Mines (now Montana Technological University) and Northern Montana College (now Montana State University–Northern), beginning the 1934–35 academic year.
- 1936 – Carroll College of Montana and Eastern Montana Normal College (now Montana State University–Billings) joined the MSCC, which was rebranded as the Montana Collegiate Conference (MCC) in the 1936–37 academic year.
- 1947 – Billings Poly and Intermountain Union merge to form Rocky Mountain College.
- 1966 – The MCC was rebranded as the Frontier Conference, beginning the 1966–67 academic year.
- 1974 – The College of Great Falls (later the University of Great Falls, now the University of Providence) joined the Frontier in the 1974–75 academic year.
- 1980 – Montana State–Billings (MSU Billings) left the Frontier to join the Division II ranks of the National Collegiate Athletic Association (NCAA) as an NCAA D-II Independent (which would later join the Great Northwest Conference (later the Pacific West Conference or PacWest), beginning 1982–83) after the 1979–80 academic year.
- 1984 – Great Falls left the Frontier as the school discontinued its athletic program after the 1983–84 academic year.
- 1998 – Lewis–Clark State College and Westminster College joined the Frontier in the 1998–99 academic year.
- 1999 – Great Falls rejoined the Frontier after 15 years without an athletics program in the 1999–2000 academic year.
- 2008 – Eastern Oregon University joined the Frontier as an affiliate member for football in the 2008 fall season (2008–09 academic year).
- 2012:
  - Dickinson State University joined the Frontier in the 2012–13 academic year.
  - Southern Oregon University joined the Frontier as an affiliate member for football in the 2012 fall season (2012–13 academic year).
- 2014:
  - Dickinson State left the Frontier to join the North Star Athletic Association (NSAA) after the 2013–14 academic year.
  - The College of Idaho joined the Frontier as an affiliate member for football in the 2014 fall season (2014–15 academic year).
- 2015 – Westminster (Utah) left the Frontier to join the NCAA Division II ranks and rejoin the Rocky Mountain Athletic Conference (RMAC) after the 2014–15 academic year.
- 2020 – Lewis–Clark State left the Frontier to join the Cascade Collegiate Conference (CCC) after the 2019–20 academic year.
- 2023 – Arizona Christian University joined the Frontier as an affiliate member for football in the 2023 fall season (2023–24 academic year)
- 2025:
  - Bellevue University, Bismarck State College, Dakota State University, Mayville State University and Valley City State University all joined the Frontier (with Dickinson State rejoining at the same time) in the 2025–26 academic year. Everyone (except Bismarck State) would join from the NSAA, which would cease operations after spring 2025.
  - Simpson University joined the Frontier as an affiliate member for football in the 2025 fall season (2025–26 academic year)
- 2027 – Providence will leave the Frontier, as the school announced that it would close following the 2026–27 academic year.

== Member schools ==
The Frontier Conference has 12 full members with football, 3 full members without football, and 5 football-only affiliate members. Bellevue, Bismarck State, and the University of Providence do not field football teams. Arizona Christian, College of Idaho, Eastern Oregon, Simpson, and Southern Oregon are the football-only affiliates.

=== Current members ===
The Frontier currently has twelve full members, four are private schools:

| Institution | Location | Founded | Affiliation | Enrollment | Nickname | Joined (Note: Represents the calendar year when fall sports competition begins.) |
|---|---|---|---|---|---|---|
| Bellevue University | Bellevue, Nebraska | 1966 | Nonsectarian | 14,476 | Bruins | 2025 |
| Bismarck State College | Bismarck, North Dakota | 1939 | Public (Note: Part of the North Dakota University System.) | 4,773 | Mystics | 2025 |
| Carroll College | Helena, Montana | 1909 | Catholic (Diocese of Helena) | 1,103 | Fighting Saints | 1935 |
| Dakota State University | Madison, South Dakota | 1881 | Public | 3,975 | Trojans | 2025 |
| Dickinson State University | Dickinson, North Dakota | 1918 | Public | 1,453 | Blue Hawks | 2012; 2025 (Note: Dickinson State was a member of the Frontier Conference from 2012 to 2014.) |
| Mayville State University | Mayville, North Dakota | 1889 | Public | 1,025 | Comets | 2025 |
| Montana State University–Northern | Havre, Montana | 1929 | Public (Note: Part of the Montana University System.) | 1,021 | Lights & Skylights | 1935 |
| Montana Technological University | Butte, Montana | 1889 | Public | 1,622 | Orediggers | 1934 |
| University of Montana Western | Dillon, Montana | 1893 | Public | 1,458 | Bulldogs | 1934 |
| University of Providence (Note: Formerly known as the University of Great Falls until 2017.) | Great Falls, Montana | 1932 | Catholic (Ursulines) | 677 | Argonauts | 1974; 1999 (Note: Providence (then known as Great Falls) did not have an athletics program from 1984–85 to 1998–99.) |
| Rocky Mountain College (Note: Rocky Mountain was formed by a merger of Intermountain Union College and Billings Polytechnic Institute since late 1935. But their athletic programs continued until the end of the 1935–36 school year.) | Billings, Montana | 1878 | various (Note: Rocky Mountain has various affiliations: The Mainline Protestant, the United Methodist Church, the Presbyterian Church (USA), and the United Church of Christ.) | 1,032 | Battlin' Bears | 1947 |
| Valley City State University | Valley City, North Dakota | 1890 | Public | 1,754 | Vikings | 2025 |

=== Affiliate members ===
The Frontier currently has five affiliate members, three of them are private schools:

| Institution | Location | Founded | Affiliation | Enrollment | Nickname | Joined (Note: Represents the calendar year when fall sports competition begins.) | Frontier sport | Primary conference |
|---|---|---|---|---|---|---|---|---|
| Arizona Christian University | Glendale, Arizona | 1960 | Nondenominational | 1,233 | Firestorm | 2023 | Football | Great Southwest (GSAC) |
| College of Idaho | Caldwell, Idaho | 1891 | Presbyterian (PCUSA) | 1,076 | Coyotes | 2014 | Football | Cascade (CCC) |
| Eastern Oregon University | La Grande, Oregon | 1929 | Public | 2,798 | Mountaineers | 2008 | Football | Cascade (CCC) |
| Simpson University | Redding, California | 1921 | Christian & Missionary Alliance | 907 | Red Hawks | 2025 | Football | California Pacific (CalPac) |
| Southern Oregon University | Ashland, Oregon | 1872 | Public | 5,371 | Raiders | 2012 | Football | Cascade (CCC) |

Notes

=== Former members ===
The Frontier had three former full members, only one was a private school:

| Institution | Location | Founded | Affiliation | Enrollment | Nickname | Joined (Note: Represents the calendar year when fall sports competition begins.) | Left (Note: Represents the calendar year when spring sports competition ends.) | Subsequent conference(s) | Current conference |
|---|---|---|---|---|---|---|---|---|---|
| Lewis–Clark State College | Lewiston, Idaho | 1893 | Public | 3,706 | Warriors & Lady Warriors | 1998 | 2020 | Cascade (CCC) (2020–present) | |
| Eastern Montana College (Note: Currently known as Montana State University–Billings since 1994. Eastern Montana was the school name that reflected its use during conference membership.) | Billings, Montana | 1927 | Public | 4,092 | Yellowjackets | 1933 | 1980 | various (Note: Eastern Montana (now Montana State–Billings) had joined the following subsequent conferences: as an NCAA D-II Independent from 1980–81 to 1981–82; the Pacific West Conference (Note: Currently an NCAA Division II athletic conference.) (PacWest) from 1982–83 to 2004–05 (originally known as the Great Northwest Conference from 1982–83 to 1991–92); and the Heartland Conference from 2005–06 to 2006–07.) | Great Northwest (GNAC) (2007–present) |
| Westminster College (Note: Currently known as Westminster University since 2023.) | Salt Lake City, Utah | 1875 | Nonsectarian | 1,214 | Griffins | 1998 | 2015 | Rocky Mountain (RMAC) (2015–present) | |

=== Membership timeline ===
Full member (all sports) Full member (non-football) Associate member (football-only)

== National championships ==
=== Basketball ===
Montana Western won the NAIA national title in Division I Women's basketball, in 2019.

Rocky Mountain won the national title in men's basketball, NAIA Division I, in 2009.

Montana State-Northern won the national title in women's basketball, NAIA Division II, in 1993.

Carroll reached the semi-finals in men's basketball in 2005, as did Lewis-Clark State in women's basketball in 2001.

University of Providence reached finals in women's basketball in 2024, Providence defeated Carroll College in the semi finals. This marked the first time two Frontier teams meet in the national tournament.

=== Football ===
Carroll has won the NAIA national championship six times: four straight, from 2002 to 2005, also in 2007 and 2010, and has been runner-up twice.

Southern Oregon won the NAIA national championship in the 2014 season.

Montana Tech was the national runner-up in 1996.

=== Wrestling ===
Montana State-Northern has won six wrestling titles: 1991, 1992, 1998-2000, 2004, and was runner-up in 1990, 1993, and 2002.

Montana Western was co-champion in 1994.

In 2014, the University of Great Falls was second and Montana State-Northern took third at the NAIA national wrestling championship.

=== Bowling ===
College of Great Falls (now University of Providence) was the 1973 Men's NAIA National Bowling Champion.

== Conference champions ==
=== Football ===
From 1935 until 2024, an overall conference champion was awarded. Starting in 2025, only a West and East division champion are awarded, with no overall conference champion being named.

By team

| Team | Conference | | Division | |
| Team | Titles | Last title | Titles | Last title |
|---|---|---|---|---|
| Carroll | 39 | 2022 | 0 | N/A |
| Montana Western | 21 | 2024 | 0 | N/A |
| Montana Tech | 13 | 2016 | 2 | 2026 |
| Rocky Mountain | 11 | 2021 | 0 | N/A |
| MSU Billings | 11 | 1975 | 0 | N/A |
| College of Idaho | 4 | 2022 | 2 | 2026 |
| Southern Oregon | 2 | 2017 | 0 | N/A |
| Eastern Oregon | 1 | 2020 | 0 | N/A |

By year

| Year | Team |
|---|---|
| 1935 | Montana Western |
| 1936 | Montana Tech; Montana Western |
| 1937 | Rocky Mountain |
| 1938 | Rocky Mountain |
| 1939 | Montana Tech |
| 1940 | Caroll |
| 1941 | Caroll |
| 1942 | No games, WWII |
| 1943 | No games, WWII |
| 1944 | No games, WWII |
| 1945 | No games, WWII |
| 1946 | Montana Western |
| 1947 | Montana Western |
| 1948 | MSU Billings |
| 1949 | Montana Western |
| 1950 | Carroll |
| 1951 | Carroll |
| 1952 | Carroll |
| 1953 | Carroll |
| 1954 | Carroll |
| 1955 | Rocky Mountain |
| 1956 | Rocky Mountain |
| 1957 | MSU Billings |
| 1958 | MSU Billings |
| 1959 | Carroll; MSU Billings |
| 1960 | MSU Billings; Rocky Mountain |

| Year | Team |
|---|---|
| 1961 | Montana Western |
| 1962 | Montana Western |
| 1963 | Montana Western |
| 1964 | MSU Billings |
| 1965 | MSU Billings |
| 1966 | MSU Billings |
| 1967 | Montana Western |
| 1968 | MSU Billings |
| 1969 | Montana Western |
| 1970 | Montana Tech |
| 1971 | MSU Billings |
| 1972 | Carroll; Montana Tech |
| 1973 | Carroll |
| 1974 | Carroll |
| 1975 | MSU Billings |
| 1976 | Carroll |
| 1977 | Montana Western |
| 1978 | Carroll |
| 1979 | Montana Tech |
| 1980 | Carroll; Montana Western |
| 1981 | Carroll |
| 1982 | Carroll; Montana Western |
| 1983 | Montana Tech |
| 1984 | Rocky Mountain |
| 1985 | Carroll |

| Year | Team |
|---|---|
| 1986 | Carroll |
| 1987 | Carroll |
| 1988 | Carroll |
| 1989 | Carroll |
| 1990 | Carroll |
| 1991 | Rocky Mountain |
| 1992 | Montana Tech |
| 1993 | Carroll; Montana Western |
| 1994 | Montana Western |
| 1995 | Montana Western |
| 1996 | Montana Tech |
| 1997 | Montana Tech |
| 1998 | Rocky Mountain |
| 1999 | Rocky Mountain |
| 2000 | Carroll |
| 2001 | Carroll |
| 2002 | Carroll; Montana Western |
| 2003 | Carroll |
| 2004 | Carroll; Montana Tech; Montana Western |
| 2005 | Carroll |
| 2006 | Carroll |
| 2007 | Carroll |
| 2008 | Carroll |
| 2009 | Carroll |
| 2010 | Carroll |

| Year | Team |
|---|---|
| 2011 | Carroll |
| 2012 | Montana Tech; Southern Oregon |
| 2013 | Carroll |
| 2014 | Carroll |
| 2015 | Montana Tech |
| 2016 | Montana Tech |
| 2017 | Southern Oregon |
| 2018 | Rocky Mountain |
| 2019 | College of Idaho |
| 2020 | Carroll; College of Idaho; Eastern Oregon |
| 2021 | College of Idaho; Montana Western; Rocky Mountain |
| 2022 | Carroll; College of Idaho |
| 2023 | Montana Western |
| 2024 | Montana Western |

| | West Division | | East Division | |
| Year | School | Record | School | Record |
|---|---|---|---|---|
| 2025 | College of Idaho | 6–0 | Montana Tech | 6–0 |
| 2026 | College of Idaho | 6–0 | Montana Tech | 6–0 |

=== Men's basketball ===
Frontier championships won per school

| School | Regular season | | Tournament | |
| School | Titles | Last Title | Titles | Last Title |
|---|---|---|---|---|
| Montana Western | 22 | 2017–18 | 3 | 1991 |
| Carroll | 20 | 2021–22 | 8 | 2018 |
| MSU Billings | 15 | 1979–80 | 3 | 1980 |
| Rocky Mountain | 15 | 2025–26 | 8 | 2026 |
| Montana Tech | 10 | 2024–25 | 11 | 2025 |
| Lewis–Clark State | 8 | 2019–20 | 9 | 2020 |
| Westminster | 7 | 2009–10 | 2 | 2010 |
| Montana State–Northern | 5 | 2011–12 | 4 | 2012 |
| Providence | 4 | 2020–21 | 3 | 2021 |

=== Women's basketball ===
Frontier championships won per school

| School | Regular season | | Tournament | |
| School | Titles | Last Title | Titles | Last Title |
|---|---|---|---|---|
| Montana State–Northern | 15 | 1998–99 | 14 | 1999 |
| Carroll | 8 | 2023–24 | 6 | 2023 |
| Lewis–Clark State | 7 | 2016–17 | 8 | 2017 |
| Westminster | 7 | 2014–15 | 3 | 2015 |
| Montana Western | 4 | 2018–19 | 5 | 2006 |
| Rocky Mountain | 4 | 2024–25 | 3 | 2022 |
| Providence | 3 | 2021–22 | 4 | 2025 |
| Montana Tech | 2 | 1982–83 | 2 | 2026 |
| MSU Billings | 2 | 1977–78 | 0 | N/A |
| Dakota State | 1 | 2025–26 | 0 | N/A |

=== Volleyball ===
Frontier championships won per school

| School | Regular season | | Tournament | |
| School | Titles | Last Title | Titles | Last Title |
|---|---|---|---|---|
| Carroll | 15 | 2016 | 13 | 2016 |
| Montana Tech | 12 | 2023 | 6 | 2017 |
| Lewis–Clark State | 9 | 2012 | 6 | 2010 |
| Providence | 6 | 2025 | 6 | 2025 |
| Rocky Mountain | 5 | 2018 | 7 | 2022 |
| Montana State–Northern | 5 | 2013 | 3 | 1991 |
| Montana Western | 3 | 2002 | 2 | 2023 |
| Westminster | 1 | 2005 | 1 | 2005 |
| MSU Billings | 1 | 1977 | 1 | 1977 |
| Bellevue | 1 | 2026 | 0 | N/A |

== Sports sponsored ==
The following divisional format is used only for football.
East
- Dakota State
- Dickinson State
- Mayville State
- Montana State–Northern
- Montana Tech
- Rocky Mountain
- Valley City State
West
- Arizona Christian
- Carroll (Mont.)
- C. of Idaho
- Eastern Oregon
- Montana–Western
- Simpson
- Southern Oregon
The following divisional format is used only for other sports (if applied).
East
- Bellevue
- Bismarck State
- Dakota State
- Dickinson State
- Mayville State
- Valley City State
West
- Carroll (Mont.)
- Montana–Western
- Montana State–Northern
- Montana Tech
- Providence (Mont.)
- Rocky Mountain

| Sport | Men's | Women's |
|---|---|---|
| Baseball | ✓ | |
| Basketball | ✓ | ✓ |
| Cross Country | ✓ | ✓ |
| Football | ✓ | |
| Golf | ✓ | ✓ |
| Softball | | ✓ |
| Track & Field Indoor | ✓ | ✓ |
| Track & Field Outdoor | ✓ | ✓ |
| Volleyball | | ✓ |

== See also ==
- 2012 Frontier Conference football season
