= List of current NAIA football coaches =

The National Association of Intercollegiate Athletics (NAIA) includes 97 teams. Each team has one head coach. As of the 2026 season, the NAIA is composed of nine conferences: the Appalachian Athletic Conference (AAC), Frontier Conference, Great Plains Athletic Conference (GPAC), Heart of America Athletic Conference (HAAC), Kansas Collegiate Athletic Conference (KCAC), Mid-South Conference (MSC), Mid-States Football Association (MSFA), Sooner Athletic Conference (SAC), and the Sun Conference (TSC), as well as two schools that compete as independents.

As of the start of the 2026 season, the longest-tenured coach in NAIA, is Dennis McCulloch of Valley City State University, who has been head coach at the school since 1997. In all, 20 NAIA programs will have new head coaches in 2026.

Conference affiliations are current for the 2026 season. One future NAIA team has hired its head coach; that team is indicated with a light blue background. Records are current as of 7/27/26.

== Coaches ==
Team	Conference	Head coach	First season	W	L	W%	W	L	W%	Offensive coordinator(s)	Defensive coordinator(s)	Special teams coordinator(s)
Bluefield Rams	AAC	Dewey Lusk	2017	44	51	.463	57	93	.380	Kelly Scott	Mike Ketchum	Phillip Dunford
Kentucky Christian Knights	AAC	Jason Aubry	2023	7	25	.219	12	33	.267	Joby Sullivan	Roland Brady	Vacant
Pikeville Bears	AAC	Corey Fipps	2021	27	25	.519	39	54	.419	Vacant	Chris Elliott	Michael Harris
Point Skyhawks	AAC	Nigel Lawrence	2025	4	6	.400	4	6	.400	Mike Belin	James Amos	Kelvin Kelley
Reinhardt Eagles	AAC	James Miller	2017	78	23	.772	78	23	.772	Tyler Hennes	Bryce Suber	Vacant
Rio Grande RedStorm	AAC	Mike Bartrum	2026	0	0	–	0	0	–	Kole Carter	Keith Rucker	Vacant
Union Commonwealth Bulldogs	AAC	Boston Bryant	2025	3	6	.333	3	6	.333	David Cunningham	Jeremiah McKibben	Ben Watson
Arizona Christian Firestorm	Frontier	Drew Maddox	2026	0	0	–	22	16	.580	Brett Nelson	Josh Graham	Vacant
Bismarck State Mystics	Frontier	Chris Stutzriem	2027	0	0	–	30	35	.462	Teague Blome	Vacant	Vacant
Carroll (MT) Fighting Saints	Frontier	Troy Purcell	2019	46	22	.676	46	22	.676	Alex Pfannenstiel	Joe Dunning	Dylan Torgerson
College of Idaho Coyotes	Frontier	Mike Moroski	2014	81	47	.633	81	47	.633	Brian Taylor	Chris Jewell	Austin Nelson
Dakota State Trojans	Frontier	Josh Anderson	2009	72	102	.414	72	102	.414	Logan Levy	Daidrick Kibbie	Vacant
Dickinson State Blue Hawks	Frontier	Pete Stanton	2014	98	36	.731	98	36	.731	Russell McCarvel	Jason Thier	Nate Masterson
Eastern Oregon Mountaineers	Frontier	Solo Taylor	2026	0	0	–	0	0	–	Miguel Avina	Bryan Mills	Vacant
Mayville State Comets	Frontier	Rocky Larson	2020	20	43	.317	20	43	.317	Scott Olsen	Jake Litecky	Nick Flesland
Montana State–Northern Lights	Frontier	Jerome Souers	2022	3	38	.073	126	152	.453	Vacant	Dylan Wampler	Vacant
Montana Tech Orediggers	Frontier	Kyle Samson	2020	40	16	.714	40	16	.714	Travis Dean	Montell Allen	Vacant
Montana Western Bulldogs	Frontier	Ryan Nourse	2016	71	48	.597	71	48	.597	Jed Heffernan / Tyler Murray	Riley Martello	Justin Hurd
Rocky Mountain Battlin' Bears	Frontier	Randy Bandelow	2026	0	0	–	0	0	–	Nick Voorhees	Michael Brunk	Vacant
Simpson (CA) Red Hawks	Frontier	Trevor Utter	2026	0	0	–	0	0	–	Garrett Sandow	Jacob Zier	Andrew Motuapauka
Southern Oregon Raiders	Frontier	Berk Brown	2023	17	14	.548	17	14	.548	Tim Souza	Zak Sauve	Vacant
Valley City State Vikings	Frontier	Dennis McCulloch	1997	171	119	.590	171	119	.590	Dustin Yorek	Gregg Horner	Vacant
Briar Cliff Chargers	GPAC	Nathan Koziol	2026	0	0	–	0	0	–	Ryan Sayre	Vacant	Jaiden-Aavery Stowers
Concordia (NE) Bulldogs	GPAC	Patrick Daberkow	2017	47	41	.534	47	41	.534	Vacant	Corby Osten	Trent Laune
Dakota Wesleyan Tigers	GPAC	Alex Kretzschmar	2024	8	14	.364	8	14	.364	Vacant	Chris Bessler	Mason Frost
Doane Tigers	GPAC	Jonathan Johnson	2024	5	16	.238	5	16	.238	Dallas Tidwell	Jordan Potts	Vacant
Dordt Defenders	GPAC	Joel Penner	2016	73	33	.689	73	33	.689	Levi Jungling	Brandon McCormick	Vacant
Hastings Broncos	GPAC	Matt Franzen	2021	21	32	.396	86	81	.515	James Bauer	Kyle Suttles	Vacant
Midland Warriors	GPAC	Jeff Jamrog	2016	63	42	.600	63	42	.600	Sean Lagerstrom	Denny Honnold	Vacant
Morningside Mustangs	GPAC	Steve Ryan	2002	249	50	.833	249	50	.833	Chris Silva	Casey Jacobsen / Nate Turner	Tarence Roby
Mount Marty Lancers	GPAC	John Michaletti	2021	16	39	.291	16	39	.291	Josh Lewis	Dylan Heck	Vacant
Northwestern (IA) Red Raiders	GPAC	Matt McCarty	2016	96	26	.787	96	26	.787	Blake Fryar	Brett Moser	Korbyn Gramstad
Waldorf Warriors	GPAC	David Calloway	2026	0	0	–	30	49	.381	Danny Donadio / Jermaine Gales	Vacant	Vacant
Baker Wildcats	HAAC	Miguel Regalado	2023	24	9	.727	24	9	.727	Vacant	Tucker Pauley	Vacant
Benedictine (KS) Ravens	HAAC	Joel Osborn	2021	49	14	.778	49	14	.778	Vacant	Trevor Strong	Andy Merfeld
Central Methodist Eagles	HAAC	Dave Brown	2023	5	28	.152	5	28	.152	Vacant	EJ Valentine	Vacant
Clarke Pride	HAAC	Heath Zuck	2026	0	0	–	0	0	–	Chasen Gempeler	Malik Starks	Treston Womack
Culver–Stockton Wildcats	HAAC	Tom Sallay	2017	34	58	.370	34	58	.370	RJ Melton	James Bowman	Vacant
Graceland Yellowjackets	HAAC	Phil Staback	2025	3	7	.300	3	7	.300	Dustin Bolen	Jesse Ornelas	Vacant
Grand View Vikings	HAAC	E. J. Peterson	2025	14	0	1.000	14	0	1.000	Jordan Knock	Tyler Martin	Jake Munkwitz
MidAmerica Nazarene Pioneers	HAAC	Ivan Cordova	2025	7	4	.636	7	4	.636	Vacant	Vacant	Kevon McGrew
Missouri Baptist Spartans	HAAC	Marc Lillibridge	2026	0	0	–	0	0	–	Vacant	Derrick Berry	Vacant
Missouri Valley Vikings	HAAC	LaQuentin Black	2025	3	7	.300	3	7	.300	Jacoby Bellard / Jack Goulet	Kevin Griffin	Jake Wilson
Mount Mercy Mustangs	HAAC	MD Daniels	2026	0	0	–	7	18	.280	Vacant	Raul Lozano	Jakim Brock
Peru State Bobcats	HAAC	Sean Wilkerson	2026	0	0	–	0	0	–	Mike Canales	Vacant	Vacant
St. Ambrose Fighting Bees	HAAC	Vince Fillipp	2022	10	32	.238	10	32	.238	DeQuinn Watford	Matt McKay	Bernard Buhake
William Penn Statesmen	HAAC	Marc Benavidez	2023	19	14	.576	58	26	.690	Grant Garth	Jay Burns / Matt Byers	Vacant
William Woods Owls	HAAC	Sam Camp	2025	1	10	.091	1	10	.091	Vacant	Justin Coleman	Vacant
Andrew Fighting Tigers	Independent	Nick Garrett	2024	13	3	.813	13	3	.813	Vacant	Vacant	Alex Plasko
Faulkner Eagles	Independent	Dayne Brown	2025	4	6	.400	4	6	.400	Nick Anderson	Jeremy Perkovich	Camden Trice
Avila Eagles	KCAC	Ed Warinner	2026	0	0	–	0	0	–	Erick Burzanko	Mark Rhea	Tanner Purdum
Bethany (KS) Swedes	KCAC	Mike Grossner	2023	7	26	.212	124	81	.605	Vacant	Josh Seybert	Vacant
Bethel (KS) Threshers	KCAC	Josh Lawson	2025	3	8	.273	3	8	.273	Taggart Brown	Drametrice Smith	Vacant
Evangel Valor	KCAC	Chuck Hepola	2016	70	36	.660	70	36	.660	Ryne Strickland	Jeremy DeSoto	Vacant
Friends Falcons	KCAC	Terry Harrison	2022	36	12	.750	36	12	.750	Vacant	Vacant	Vacant
Kansas Wesleyan Coyotes	KCAC	Matt Middleton	2025	7	4	.636	7	4	.636	Boomer Cunningham / Josh Qualls	David Leonard	Ben Blahauvietz
McPherson Bulldogs	KCAC	Jeremiah Fiscus	2019	41	30	.577	41	30	.577	Chris Jenkins / Joshua Pisik	Mitch Leppke	Vacant
Ottawa Braves	KCAC	Nick Davis	2022	15	29	.341	15	29	.341	Spencer Wheeler	Ahmad Smith	Chris Edwards
Saint Mary (KS) Spires	KCAC	Taylor Calvert	2026	0	0	–	0	0	–	Vacant	Vacant	Vacant
Southwestern (KS) Moundbuilders	KCAC	Brad Griffin	2015	73	47	.608	73	47	.608	Ryan Nelson	Drew Smith	Vacant
Sterling Warriors	KCAC	Reggie Langford Jr.	2024	3	19	.136	3	19	.136	Vacant	Andrew Downing	Darren Porche
Tabor Bluejays	KCAC	Mike Gardner	2010	117	80	.594	142	98	.592	Kevin Roehrich	C. J. Hill	Vacant
Bethel (TN) Wildcats	MSC	Chris Springer	2025	4	5	.444	4	5	.444	Vacant	Kris Beauchamp	Vacant
Campbellsville Tigers	MSC	Hunter Brown	2026	0	0	–	0	0	–	Vacant	Jody Ford	Matt Atwood
Cumberland (TN) Phoenix	MSC	Tim Mathis	2018	37	42	.468	37	42	.468	Bobby Brown	Patrick Miller	Vacant
Cumberlands (KY) Patriots	MSC	Shan Housekeeper	2022	20	20	.500	20	20	.500	Adam Morris	Starr Thompson	Vacant
Georgetown (KY) Tigers	MSC	John Perin	2025	7	3	.700	7	3	.700	Caleb Corrill	Devvon Gage	Vacant
Lindsey Wilson Blue Raiders	MSC	Phil Kleckler	2022	32	11	.744	32	11	.744	Jay Bright	Daniel Cotter	Vacant
Defiance Yellow Jackets	MSFA	Bill Nickell	2022	14	26	.350	14	26	.350	Dave Taynor	Joseph Webb	Nick Lopez
Indiana Wesleyan Wildcats	MSFA	Andrew Rode	2023	30	7	.811	30	7	.811	Travis Palmer	Isaac Bower	Vacant
Judson Eagles	MSFA	Shawn Flynn	2025	1	10	.091	1	10	.091	Vacant	Amos Velasquez	Nolan Owen
Lawrence Tech Blue Devils	MSFA	Oscar Olejniczak	2025	2	8	.200	2	8	.200	Vacant	Kyle Nystrom	Vacant
Madonna Crusaders	MSFA	Brett Guminsky	2024	1	21	.045	1	21	.045	Philip Guel / Gerald McCants	Matt Strzalkowski	Prince AyoOla
Marian (IN) Knights	MSFA	Ted Karras Jr.	2023	73	31	.702	97	80	.548	Matt King	Clay Emmrich	Steve Tutsie
Olivet Nazarene Tigers	MSFA	Avante Mitchell	2024	12	8	.600	25	37	.403	Keith Beckham	Terrance Wilson	DeShawn Gilbert
St. Francis (IL) Fighting Saints	MSFA	Joe Curry	2012	74	70	.514	74	70	.514	Matt McCarthy	Thomas Miller	Vacant
Saint Francis (IN) Cougars	MSFA	Adam Sherman	2025	10	3	.769	10	3	.769	Austin Dreyer	Nate Jensen / Willis Sands	Cam Peterson
Saint Mary-of-the-Woods Pomeroys	MSFA	Blaine Powell	2026	0	0	–	0	0	–	Trey Powell	Michael Hayden	Griffin Olson
Saint Xavier Cougars	MSFA	Mike Feminis	1999	227	91	.714	227	91	.714	Mark Yanule	Tyler Reinhardt	Vacant
Taylor Trojans	MSFA	Aaron Mingo	2021	26	28	.481	26	28	.481	Josh Flannery	Jared Boddie	Adam Langvardt
Arkansas Baptist Buffaloes	SAC	Richard Wilson	2021	6	39	.133	6	39	.133	Vacant	Ashdone Bailey	Vacant
Langston Lions	SAC	Calvin Miller (interim)	2026	0	0	–	0	0	–	Joe Dickinson	William Jones III	Vacant
Louisiana Christian Wildcats	SAC	Ben McLaughlin	2024	12	10	.545	12	10	.545	Cory York	James Wood	Vacant
Nelson Lions	SAC	Jared Hudgins	2024	6	14	.300	6	14	.300	Blake McCulloch	Gennard Johnson	Vacant
Oklahoma Panhandle State Aggies	SAC	Cory Miller	2023	13	17	.433	13	17	.433	Kenzie Kerns	Will Nalley	Vacant
OUAZ Spirit	SAC	Reilly Murphy	2025	8	1	.889	16	18	.471	Timm Rosenbach	Jerry Dominguez	Garrett Casteel
Texas College Steers	SAC	Jarrail Jackson	2022	10	30	.250	10	30	.250	Stefan Cotton	Nathaniel Jones	Vacant
Texas Wesleyan Rams	SAC	Fran Johnson	2026	0	0	–	0	0	–	Vacant	Darren Drago	Vacant
Wayland Baptist Pioneers	SAC	Marcos Hinojos Sr.	2023	12	17	.414	12	17	.414	Christian Escobar	Marcos Hinojos Jr.	Thomas Walser
Ave Maria Gyrenes	TSC	Joe Patterson	2016	37	60	.381	37	60	.381	John Klacik	Keith Gilmore	Dylan Ramsey
Florida Memorial Lions	TSC	Michael Jones	2025	4	6	.400	4	6	.400	Vacant	Jarius Marlow / Marquis Smith	Clavens Charles / Roy Smith
Keiser Seahawks	TSC	Myles Russ	2024	24	2	.923	24	2	.923	Myles Notkin	Peter Davila	Logan Kelleher
St. Thomas (FL) Bobcats	TSC	Drew Davis	2026	0	0	–	0	0	–	Vacant	Mickey O'Rourke	Kevin Weston
Southeastern Fire	TSC	Jake Russell	2026	0	0	–	21	11	.656	Alex Bell	Jordan Odaffer	Ryan Beatty
Thomas Night Hawks	TSC	Dan Pippin	2026	0	0	–	0	0	–	Matt Diniak	Andrew Moore	William Paar
Warner Royals	TSC	Dialleo Burks	2022	7	31	.184	7	31	.184	Dwayne Wood	Vacant	Vacant
Webber International Warriors	TSC	Eric Potochney	2021	19	22	.463	19	22	.463	Jake Czerniakowski / Zack Sharaf	Joe Riordan	Rick Wimmer

== See also ==
- List of current NCAA Division I FBS football coaches
- List of current NCAA Division I FCS football coaches
- List of current NCAA Division II football coaches
- List of current NCAA Division III football coaches
- List of NAIA football programs
