= 2023 Keiser Seahawks football team =

American college football season

2023 Keiser Seahawks football

NAIA champion TSC champion

NAIA Championship Game, W 31–21 vs. Northwestern (IA)
- Conference: Sun Conference
- Record: 12–2 (7–0 TSC)
- Head coach: Doug Socha (6th season)
- Defensive coordinator: Robbie Owens (2nd season)
- Home stadium: Keiser Multi-Purpose Field

2023 Sun Conference football standings
| | Conf. | | | Overall |
| Team | W | | L | W | | L |
|---|---|---|---|---|---|---|
| No. 3 Keiser $^ | 7 | – | 0 | 12 | – | 2 |
| No. 15 St. Thomas (FL) ^ | 6 | – | 1 | 9 | – | 4 |
| Florida Memorial | 5 | – | 2 | 6 | – | 4 |
| Southeastern | 4 | – | 3 | 5 | – | 5 |
| Ave Maria | 2 | – | 5 | 4 | – | 6 |
| Webber International | 2 | – | 5 | 3 | – | 7 |
| Warner | 1 | – | 6 | 4 | – | 6 |
| Thomas | 1 | – | 6 | 1 | – | 8 |
$ – Conference champion; ^ – NAIA playoff participant; Rankings from NAIA Coaches' Poll

The 2023 Keiser Seahawks football team represented Keiser University as a member of the Sun Conference during the 2023 NAIA football season. Led by 6th-year head coach Doug Socha, the Seahawks compiled an overall record of 12–2 with a mark of 7–0 in conference play; winning the Sun Conference.

Keiser beat St. Thomas (FL) in the first round, Bethel (TN) in the quarterfinals, and College of Idaho in the seminfinals before playing in the 2023 NAIA Football National Championship where they played Northwestern (IA) and won 31–21 to secure the school's first-overall title. Keiser played home games at Keiser Multi-Purpose Field in West Palm Beach, Florida.

== Schedule ==
| Date | Time | Opponent | Rank | Site | Result | Attendance | Source |
|---|---|---|---|---|---|---|---|
| August 31 | 6:00 p.m. | Mississippi College* | No. 2 | Keiser Multi-Purpose Field; West Palm Beach, FL | L 14–17 | 1,450 | |
| September 9 | 12:00 p.m. | at No. 9 Lindsey Wilson* | No. 2 | Parnell Stadium; Columbia, KY | W 30–26 | 1,648 | |
| September 16 | 7:00 p.m. | at Valdosta State* | No. 4 | Bazemore–Hyder Stadium; Valdosta, GA | L 25–49 | 3,680 | |
| September 30 | 9:00 p.m. | Thomas | No. 7 | Keiser Multi-Purpose Field; West Palm Beach, FL | W 44–12 | 505 | |
| October 7 | 6:00 p.m. | No. 16 St. Thomas (FL) | No. 9 | Keiser Multi-Purpose Field; West Palm Beach, FL | W 21–14 | 1,500 | |
| October 14 | 6:00 p.m. | at Warner | No. 8 | Tye Athletic Field; Lake Wales, FL | W 69–6 | 0 | |
| October 21 | 6:00 p.m. | Southeastern | No. 7 | Keiser Multi-Purpose Field; West Palm Beach, FL | W 51–21 | 952 | |
| October 28 | 7:00 p.m. | at Ave Maria | No. 6 | Gyrene Field; Ave Maria, FL | W 54–7 | 2,281 | |
| November 4 | 6:00 p.m. | Webber International | No. 6 | Keiser Multi-Purpose Field; West Palm Beach, FL | W 59–17 | 777 | |
| November 11 | 1:00 p.m. | at Florida Memorial | No. 4 | Betty T. Ferguson Stadium; Miami Gardens, FL | W 44–13 | 300 | |
| November 25 | 1:00 p.m. | No. 13 St. Thomas (FL)* | No. 3 | Keiser Multi-Purpose Field; West Palm Beach, FL (NAIA First Round) | W 45–21 | 1,405 | |
| December 2 | 1:00 p.m. | No. 7 Bethel (TN)* | No. 3 | Keiser Multi-Purpose Field; West Palm Beach, FL (NAIA Quarterfinal) | W 56–14 | 969 | |
| December 9 | 1:00 p.m. | No. 11 College of Idaho* | No. 3 | Keiser Multi-Purpose Field; West Palm Beach, FL (NAIA Semifinal) | W 28–21 | 1,158 | |
| December 18 | 12:00 p.m. | No. 1 Northwestern (IA)* | No. 3 | Durham County Memorial Stadium; Durham, NC (NAIA Championship Game) | W 31–21 | 1,183 | |
*Non-conference game; Rankings from NAIA Coaches' Poll released prior to the game; All times are in Eastern Standard time

== Coaching staff ==
Keiser Seahawks
| Name | Position | Consecutive season at Keiser in current position | Previous position | KU profile |
| Doug Socha | Head coach | 6th | Oxbridge Academy (FL) head coach (2012–2015) | |
| Myles Russ | Assistant head coach, running backs coach, and recruiting coordinator | 6th | Robert Morris running backs coach (2012–2015) | |
| Robbie Owens | Defensive coordinator | 2nd | Helix HS (CA) head coach (2007–2021) | |
| Jalani Lord | Offensive line coach and run game coordinator | 6th | Seminole Ridge HS (FL) offensive coordinator (2009–2015) | |
| Justin Hilliker | Defensive line coach and special teams coordinator | 2nd | Keiser tight ends coach (2019–2021 | |
| Chris Ortiz | Wide receivers coach and pass game coordinator | 1st | West Florida running backs coach (2022) | |
| Mickey O'Rourke | Defensive backs coach | 5th | Oxbridge Academy (FL) defensive backs coach (2014–2016) | |
| Myles Notkin | Quarterbacks coach | 2nd | Florida Atlantic offensive analyst (2021) | |
| Nick Vagnone | Linebackers coach | 2nd | Wingate defensive graduate assistant (2020–2021) | |
| Caleb Ackley | Tight ends coach | 1st | Maine assistant offensive line coach and assistant quarterbacks coach (2021–2022) | |
| Matthew Sorrentino | Offensive analyst | 1st | N/A | |
