= Odle Arena =

Arena in Upland, Indiana

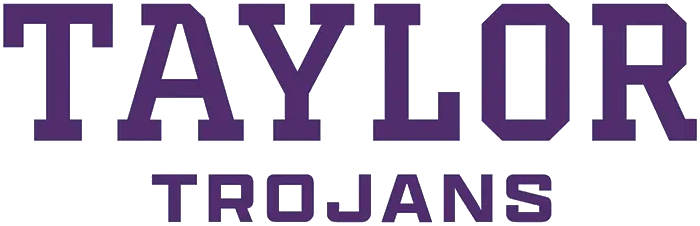

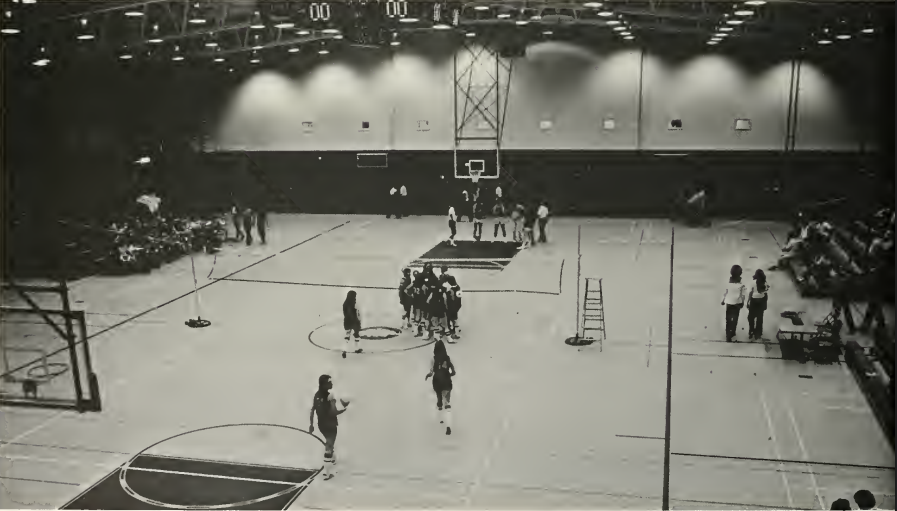
- Odle Arena interior, 1975
- Interactive map of Odle Arena
- Former names: Odle Gymnasium
- Address: 6828 E 900 S Upland, IN 46989; United States
- Coordinates: 40°27′21″N 85°30′06″W

Construction
- Opened: 1975

Odle Arena is a multi-purpose arena located on the campus of Taylor University in Upland, Indiana. It is the home court for the Taylor Trojans men's and women's intercollegiate basketball and volleyball teams, who compete in the NAIA and the Crossroads League.

== History and naming ==
Odle Arena officially opened in 1975. The building is named in honor of former Taylor coach Don Odle, who served as the men's basketball head coach for 32 seasons and also coached the football, golf, and baseball teams at various points in his career. Odle was also the founder of the Venture for Victory basketball program, a missionary outreach program that used basketball to share the gospel internationally. The main playing surface within the arena was formally named Paul Patterson Court in the fall of 2016, honoring longtime men's basketball coach Paul Patterson. Patterson guided the Trojans from 1979 through 2013, amassing a record of success that included 15 league championships and 14 trips to the NAIA National Tournament.

== Facilities and uses ==
Odle Arena features stadium seating for approximately 1,500 spectators. The facility is air-conditioned and the main court is lined for both basketball and volleyball play.

The arena has undergone several major renovations since its opening. In 1998, the original floor surface was replaced with a new maple wood court. In 2012, a major renovation installed new seating, including chair-back seats behind the benches, and a new heating and air conditioning system. In 2016, the court was resurfaced and named Paul Patterson Court. New lighting, banners, and a video screen were also installed.

Beyond serving as the primary competition venue, Odle Arena houses significant portions of Taylor University's athletic and health departments, including offices for the Taylor University Intercollegiate Athletic Department. the Athletic Training Department. and the Kinesiology Department (formerly Physical Education and Human Performance). It also houses locker rooms, racquetball courts, classrooms, a concession stand, and the Taylor Athletic Hall of Fame. In 2004, the Kesler Student Activities Center (KSAC), which contains an indoor track and additional recreational courts, was constructed and physically connected to the west side of Odle Arena, expanding the overall athletic complex.
