= Andrew Rode =

American football coach (born c. 1986)

Current position
- Title: Head coach
- Team: Indiana Wesleyan
- Conference: MSFA
- Record: 30–7

Biographical details
- Born: c. 1986 (age 39–40)
- Education: Wabash College (2009); Greenville University (2013)

Playing career
- 2005–2008: Wabash
- Position: Wide receiver

Coaching career (HC unless noted)
- 2009: Wabash (GA)
- 2010: Anderson (IN) (WR)
- 2011–2012: Greenville (ST)
- 2013–2014: Greenville (OC)
- 2015–2019: Concordia (MI) (OC)
- 2020–2022: Morningside (OC)
- 2023–present: Indiana Wesleyan

Head coaching record
- Overall: 30–7
- Tournaments: 2–3 (NAIA playoffs)

Accomplishments and honors

Championships
- 3 MSFA Mideast League (2023–2025)

Andrew Rode (/roʊdi/) (born c. 1986) is an American college football coach. He is the head football coach for Indiana Wesleyan University, a position he has held since 2023. He also coached for Anderson, Greenville, Concordia, and Morningside. He played college football for Wabash as a wide receiver.

== Head coaching record ==
| Year | Team | Overall | Conference | Standing | Bowl/playoffs | NAIA Coaches'^{#} |
|---|---|---|---|---|---|---|
Indiana Wesleyan Wildcats (Mid-States Football Association) (2023–present)
| 2023 | Indiana Wesleyan | 10–2 | 6–1 | T–1st (MEL) | L NAIA Quarterfinal | 6 |
| 2024 | Indiana Wesleyan | 11–2 | 5–0 | 1st (MEL) | L NAIA Quarterfinal | 3 |
| 2025 | Indiana Wesleyan | 9–3 | 5–0 | 1st (MEL) | L NAIA Second Round | 10 |
| 2026 | Indiana Wesleyan | 0–0 | 0–0 | (MEL) | | |
| Indiana Wesleyan: | | 30–7 | 16–1 | | | |
| Total: | | 30–7 | | | | |
National championship Conference title Conference division title or championship game berth
