= Matt McCarty =

Matt McCarty may refer to:

- Matt McCarty (golfer) (born 1997), American professional golfer
- Matt McCarty (American football), American football coach
