= 2023 NAIA football rankings =

Rankings for the 2023 NAIA football season

- Season: 2023
- Postseason: Single-elimination
- National champions: Keiser
- Runner up: Northwestern (IA)
- Conference with most teams in final poll: HAAC and Frontier (4)

The 2023 National Association of Intercollegiate Athletics (NAIA) football rankings are conducted on a week-to-week basis starting after week three.

== Legend ==
	Increase in ranking
	Decrease in ranking
	Not ranked previous week or no change
(#–#)	Win–loss record
(Italics)	Number of first place votes
т	Tied with team above or below also with this symbol

== NAIA Coaches' poll ==
	Preseason August 21	Week 1 September 11	Week 2 September 18	Week 3 September 25	Week 4 October 2	Week 5 October 9	Week 6 October 16	Week 7 October 23	Week 8 October 30	Week 9 November 6	Week 10 (Final) November 12	
1.	Northwestern (IA) (17)	Northwestern (IA) (2–0) (18)	Northwestern (IA) (3–0) (18)	Northwestern (IA) (4–0) (18)	Northwestern (IA) (18) (5–0)	Northwestern (IA) (6–0) (18)	Northwestern (IA) (7–0) (18)	Northwestern (IA) (8–0) (18)	Northwestern (IA) (9–0) (18)	Northwestern (IA) (10–0) (18)	Northwestern (IA) (11–0) (18)	1.
2.	Keiser (1)	Grand View (2–0)	Grand View (3–0)	Grand View (4–0)	Grand View (5–0)	Grand View (5–0)	Grand View (6–0)	Grand View (7–0)	Grand View (8–0)	Grand View (9–0)	Grand View (10–0)	2.
3.	Grand View	Morningside (2–0)	Morningside (3–0)	Morningside (4–0)	Morningside (5–0)	Morningside (6–0)	Morningside (7–0)	Morningside (8–0)	Indiana Wesleyan (8–0)	Indiana Wesleyan (9–0)	Keiser (8–2)	3.
4.	Morningside	Keiser (1–1)	Indiana Wesleyan (3–0)	Indiana Wesleyan (4–0)	Indiana Wesleyan (5–0)	Indiana Wesleyan (6–0)	Indiana Wesleyan (7–0)	Indiana Wesleyan (7–0)	Marian (IN) (8–0)	Keiser (7–2)	Georgetown (KY) (8–1)	4.
5.	Indiana Wesleyan	Indiana Wesleyan (2–0)	Marian (IN) (3–0)	Marian (IN) (3–0)	Marian (IN) (4–0)	Marian (IN) (5–0)	Marian (IN) (6–0)	Marian (IN) (7–0)	Morningside (8–1)	College of Idaho (8–1)	Marian (IN) (9–1)	5.
6.	Marian (IN)	Marian (IN) (2–0)	Bethel (TN) (3–0)	Bethel (TN) (4–0)	Bethel (TN) (5–0)	Southwestern (KS) (6–0)	Carroll (MT) (6–0)	Keiser (5–2)	Keiser (6–2)	Georgetown (KY) (7–1)	Indiana Wesleyan (9–1)	6.
7.	Benedictine (KS)	Bethel (TN) (2–0)	College of Idaho (3–0)	Keiser (1–2)	Southwestern (KS) (6–0)	Carroll (MT) (5–0)	Keiser (4–2)	Lindsey Wilson (6–1)	College of Idaho (8–1)	Marian (IN) (8–1)	Bethel (TN) (10–1)	7.
8.	Bethel (TN)	College of Idaho (3–0)	Keiser (1–2)	Southwestern (KS) (5–0)	Carroll (MT) (5–0)	Keiser (3–2)	Lindsey Wilson (5–1)	College of Idaho (7–1)	Georgetown (KY) (6–1)	Bethel (TN) (9–1)	Montana Western (9–1)	8.
9.	Lindsey Wilson	Southwestern (KS) (3–0)	Southwestern (KS) (4–0)	Carroll (MT) (4–0)	Keiser (2–2)	Lindsey Wilson (4–1)	College of Idaho (6–1)	Georgetown (KY) (5–1)	Bethel (TN) (8–1)	Evangel (10–0)	Evangel (11–0)	9.
10.	Reinhardt	Carroll (MT) (2–0)	Carroll (MT) 3–0)	Lindsey Wilson (3–1)	Lindsey Wilson (4–1)	College of Idaho (5–1) т	Bethel (TN) (6–1)	Bethel (TN) (7–1)	Evangel (9–0)	Montana Western (8–1)	College of Idaho (8–2) т	10.
11.	Southwestern (KS)	Lindsey Wilson (1–1)	Lindsey Wilson (2–1)	Montana Tech (3–1)	Montana Tech (4–1)	Concordia (MI) (5–0) т	Georgetown (KY) (4–1)	Carroll (MT) (6–1)	Lindsey Wilson (6–2)	Lindsey Wilson (7–2)	Morningside (9–2) т	11.
12.	College of Idaho	Georgetown (KY) (2–0)	Georgetown (KY) (2–0)	College of Idaho (3–1)	College of Idaho (4–1)	Bethel (TN) (5–1)	Concordia (MI) (5–1)	Evangel (8–0)	Carroll (MT) (7–1)	Morningside (8–2)	Saint Xavier (7–3) т	12.
13.	Saint Xavier	Texas Wesleyan (2–0)	Texas Wesleyan (3–0)	St. Francis (IL) (4–0)	Concordia (MI) (4–0)	Saint Xavier (4–2)	Evangel (7–0)	Montana Western (6–1)	Montana Western (7–1)	Saint Xavier (6–3)	OUAZ (8–1)	13.
14.	St. Thomas (FL)	Reinhardt (1–1)	St. Francis (IL) (3–0)	Dordt (3–0)	Dordt (4–0)	Georgetown (KY) (3–1)	Southwestern (KS) (6–1)	Benedictine (KS) (6–2)	Benedictine (KS) (7–2)	Benedictine (KS) (8–2)	Dordt (8–2)	14.
15.	Carroll (MT)	Saint Xavier (1–1)	Montana Tech (2–1)	Concordia (MI) (3–0)	Saint Xavier (3–2)	Evangel (6–0)	Montana Western (5–1)	Saint Xavier (4–3)	Saint Xavier (5–3)	Texas Wesleyan (8–1)	St. Thomas (FL) (8–3)	15.
16.	Montana Tech	Montana Tech (1–1)	Dordt (3–0)	Saint Xavier (2–2)	St. Thomas (FL) (3–2)	Montana Tech (4–2)	Montana Tech (4–2)	Texas Wesleyan (6–1)	Texas Wesleyan (7–1)	Carroll (MT) (7–2)	Dickinson State (9–1)	16.
17.	OUAZ	St. Francis (IL) (1–1)	Concordia (MI) (3–0)	St. Thomas (FL) (2–2)	St. Francis (IL) (4–1)	Texas Wesleyan (4–1)	Saint Xavier (4–3)	St. Thomas (FL) (5–3)	St. Thomas (FL) (6–3)	Dordt (7–2)	Montana Tech (7–3)	17.
18.	Avila	Graceland (3–0)	Saint Xavier (1–2)	Evangel (5–0)	Evangel (6–0)	Benedictine (KS) (4–2)	Benedictine (KS) (5–2)	Dickinson State (6–1)	Dickinson State (7–1)	St. Thomas (FL) (7–3)	Reinhardt (8–2)	18.
19.	Dickinson State	Dordt (2–0)	Cumberlands (KY) (4–0)	Cumberlands (KY) (4–0)	Georgetown (KY) (2–1)	Montana Western (4–1)	Texas Wesleyan (5–1)	Concordia (MI) (5–2)	OUAZ (8–1)	OUAZ (7–1)	Lindsey Wilson (7–3)	19.
20.	Kansas Wesleyan	Benedictine (KS) (1–2)	Evangel (4–0)	Georgetown (KY) (2–1)	Texas Wesleyan (4–1)	Dickinson State (5–1)	Dickinson State (6–1)	OUAZ (6–1)	Concordia (MI) (6–2)	Dickinson State (8–1)	Baker (8–2)	20.
21.	Texas Wesleyan	Concordia (MI) (2–0)	Benedictine (KS) (2–2)	Texas Wesleyan (3–1)	Benedictine (KS) (4–2)	St. Thomas (FL) (3–3)	St. Thomas (FL) (4–3)	Baker (6–1)	Reinhardt (6–2)	Reinhardt (7–2)	Louisiana Christian (9–1)	21.
22.	Georgetown (KY)	OUAZ (1–1)	OUAZ (2–1)	Benedictine (KS) (3–2)	Dickinson State (4–1)	Dordt (4–1)	Dordt (5–1)	Reinhardt (5–2)	Montana Tech (5–3)	Baker (7–2)	MidAmerica Nazarene (9–2)	22.
23.	Bethel (KS)	St. Thomas (FL) (1–2)	St. Thomas (FL) (1–2)	Dickinson State (3–1)	Cumberlands (KY) (4–1)	Reinhardt (3–2)	Reinhardt (4–2)	Montana Tech (4–3)	Dordt (6–2)	Montana Tech (6–3)	Friends (9–2)	23.
24.	St. Francis (IL)	Dickinson State (2–1)	Dickinson State (2–1)	Reinhardt (2–2)	Reinhardt (2–2)	OUAZ (4–1)	OUAZ (5–1)	Southwestern (KS) (6–2)	Southwestern (KS) (7–2)	Friends (8–2)	Carroll (MT) (7–3)	24.
25.	Dordt	Evangel (3–0)	Graceland (3–1)	OUAZ (3–1)	OUAZ (4–1)	Louisiana Christian (6–0)	Friends (6–1)	Dordt (5–2)	Baker (6–2)	Louisiana Christian (8–1)	Benedictine (KS) (8–3)	25.
	Preseason August 21	Week 1 September 11	Week 2 September 18	Week 3 September 25	Week 4 October 2	Week 5 October 9	Week 6 October 16	Week 7 October 23	Week 8 October 30	Week 9 November 6	Week 10 (Final) November 12	
		Dropped: Avila (1–2); Bethel (KS) (2–1); Kansas Wesleyan (1–2)	Dropped: Reinhardt (1–2)	Dropped: Graceland (3–2)	None	Dropped: Cumberlands (KY) (4–1); St. Francis (IL) (4–1)	Dropped: Louisiana Christian	Dropped: Friends	None	Dropped: Concordia (MI); Southwestern (KS)	Dropped: Texas Wesleyan	
