= Bill Rychel =

American football coach (born c. 1978)

Current position
- Title: Athletic director
- Team: St. Thomas (FL)
- Conference: TSC

Biographical details
- Born: c. 1978 (age 47–48); Cleveland, Ohio, U.S.
- Education: University of Mount Union (2001); Coe College (2004)

Playing career
- 1997–2000: Mount Union
- Position: Guard

Coaching career (HC unless noted)
- 2001–2002: Coe (GA)
- 2003: Coe (OL)
- 2004–2005: Tri-State (AHC/OC/OL)
- 2006–2008: Ohio Northern (co-OC)
- 2009–2014: Notre Dame (OH) (OC)
- 2015: Notre Dame (OH)
- 2016–2018: Savannah State (OC)
- 2019–2025: St. Thomas (FL)

Administrative career (AD unless noted)
- 2020–present: St. Thomas (FL)

Head coaching record
- Overall: 56–29
- Tournaments: 1–3 (NAIA playoffs)

William Rychel (born c. 1978) is an American college football coach and athletic director. He is the athletic director for St. Thomas University, a position he has held since 2020. He was the head football coach for Notre Dame College in 2015. He also coached for Coe, Tri-State, Ohio Northern, and Savannah State. He played college football for Mount Union as a guard.

== Head coaching record ==
Year	Team	Overall	Conference	Standing	Bowl/playoffs	NAIA Coaches'^{#}
Notre Dame Falcons (Mountain East Conference) (2015)
2015	Notre Dame	5–6	5–5	T–5th		
Notre Dame:		5–6	5–5			
St. Thomas Bobcats (Mid-South Conference) (2019–2021)
2019	St. Thomas	4–6	2–4	T–4th (Sun)		
2020–21	St. Thomas	4–3	3–2	3rd (Sun)		
2021	St. Thomas	9–2	4–2	T–3rd (Sun)		
St. Thomas Bobcats (Sun Conference) (2022–2025)
2022	St. Thomas	9–2	5–1	2nd		15
2023	St. Thomas	9–4	6–1	2nd	L NAIA Second Round	15
2024	St. Thomas	9–2	6–1	2nd	L NAIA Second Round	5
2025	St. Thomas	7–4	5–2	T–2nd	L NAIA First Round	
St. Thomas:		51–23	31–13			
Total:		56–29				
