= Tom Sallay =

American football coach (born c. 1979)

Current position
- Title: Head coach
- Team: Culver–Stockton
- Conference: HAAC
- Record: 34–58

Biographical details
- Born: c. 1979 (age 46–47); Calumet City, Illinois, U.S.
- Education: Culver–Stockton College (2001); University of Phoenix (2005); Concordia University Chicago (2006)

Playing career

Football
- 1997–2000: Culver–Stockton
- Position: Wide receiver

Coaching career (HC unless noted)

Football
- 2001: Highland HS (MO) (assistant)
- 2002–2005: Bloom Township HS (IL) (assistant)
- 2006–2014: St. Francis (IL) (ST)
- 2015–2016: St. Francis (IL) (DC)
- 2017–present: Culver–Stockton

Baseball
- 2002: Lincoln-Way Central HS (IL) (assistant)

Head coaching record
- Overall: 34–58

Tom Sallay (born c. 1979) is an American college football coach. He is the head football coach for Culver–Stockton College, a position he has held since 2017. He also coached for Highland High School, Bloom Township High School, and St. Francis (IL). He played college football for Culver–Stockton as a wide receiver.

== Head coaching record ==
Year	Team	Overall	Conference	Standing	Bowl/playoffs	NAIA Coaches'^{#}
Culver–Stockton Wildcats (Heart of America Athletic Conference) (2017–present)
2017	Culver–Stockton	1–10	1–4	5th (North)		
2018	Culver–Stockton	4–7	2–3	T–3rd (North)		
2019	Culver–Stockton	6–5	4–1	2nd (North)		
2020–21	Culver–Stockton	1–3	0–2	5th (North)		
2021	Culver–Stockton	8–3	4–1	2nd (North)		22
2022	Culver–Stockton	5–6	3–2	3rd (North)		
2023	Culver–Stockton	1–10	0–5	6th (North)		
2024	Culver–Stockton	3–8	3–3	4th (North)		
2025	Culver–Stockton	5–6	2–4	5th (North)		
2026	Culver–Stockton	0–0	0–0	(North)		
Culver–Stockton:		34–58	19–25			
Total:		34–58				
