= Shan Housekeeper =

American football coach (born c. 1981)

Current position
- Title: Head coach
- Team: Cumberlands (KY)
- Conference: MSC
- Record: 26–24

Biographical details
- Born: c. 1981 (age 44–45); New Bloomington, Ohio, U.S.
- Education: Georgetown College (2003)

Playing career
- 1999–2002: Georgetown (KY)
- 2004: Lexington Horsemen
- Position: Linebacker

Coaching career (HC unless noted)
- 2008–2009: Georgetown (KY) (LB/S&C)
- 2010–2021: Georgetown (KY) (DC/LB/S&C)
- 2022–2026: Cumberlands (KY)

Head coaching record
- Overall: 20–20

Accomplishments and honors

Awards
- Second-team Little All-American (2002); 2× NAIA First-team All-American (2001–2002); 2× First-team All-MSC (2001–2002)

Shan Housekeeper (born c. 1981) is an American college football coach. He is the head football coach for the University of the Cumberlands, a position he has held since 2022.

== Playing career ==
Shan Housekeeper was born in 1981 to Michael and Nancy Housekeeper. He grew up in New Bloomington, Ohio, and attended Elgin High School. At Elgin, he was an honorable mention all-district selection for football as a linebacker. He also played for the school's basketball team.

After graduating from Elgin in 1999, Housekeeper enrolled at Georgetown College, where he was a member of the Tigers football team under Bill Cronin. In 2000, Housekeeper's sophomore year, he missed four games due to a broken collarbone he suffered in a game against Lambuth. He finished the season with an appearance in the 2000 NAIA national championship after tallying 45 tackles and four sacks throughout the season. In the title game, he finished with seven tackles, four tackles for loss, a fumble recovery, and a sack.

As a junior in 2001, Housekeeper earned First-team All-Mid-South Conference (MSC) honors. He was also named as an NAIA First-team All-American. He received both honors alongside being named as a Second-Time Little All-American in his senior year in 2002.

In 2004, Housekeeper signed with the Lexington Horsemen of the National Indoor Football League (NIFL).

In August 2025, Housekeeper was inducted into the Georgetown Hall of Fame as an athlete.

== Coaching career ==
Housekeeper began his coaching career in 2008 at his alma mater, Georgetown, under his former head coach Cronin. He coached the linebackers and was the strength and conditioning coach. In 2010, he was promoted to defensive coordinator.

In 2022, after 14 years with Georgetown, Housekeeper was hired as the head football coach for the University of the Cumberlands. Housekeeper's departure came after Cronin's retirement after 25 years, with Housekeeper being the second of two coordinators for Georgetown to leave for head coaching opportunities.

== Personal life ==
On December 10, 2005, Housekeeper married Tabetha Kelly of Georgetown, Kentucky, at Rice Station Christian Church in Irvine, Kentucky. They have three kids.

== Head coaching record ==
Year	Team	Overall	Conference	Standing	Bowl/playoffs
Cumberlands Patriots (Mid-South Conference) (2022–present)
2022	Cumberlands	5–5	3–5	T–6th	
2023	Cumberlands	6–4	2–4	T–4th	
2024	Cumberlands	5–5	2–4	6th	
2025	Cumberlands	4–6	1–5	T–6th	
2026	Cumberlands	6-4	2–3	5th	
Cumberlands:		26–24	10–21		
Total:		26–24			
