= Drew Davis (American football coach) =

American football coach (born 1993)

Current position
- Title: Head coach
- Team: St. Thomas (FL)
- Conference: TSC
- Record: 10–0

Biographical details
- Born: January 22, 1993 (age 33); Bonita Springs, Florida, U.S.

Playing career
- 2012: North Carolina
- 2013: Coffeyville
- 2014–2016: Ole Miss
- Position: Quarterback

Coaching career (HC unless noted)
- 2017: FIU (GA)
- 2018–2021: FIU (TE/PGC)
- 2022–2025: St. Thomas (FL) (QB)
- 2026–present: St. Thomas (FL)

Head coaching record
- Overall: 2–0

Andrew Hilton Davis (born January 22, 1993) is an American college football coach. He is the head football coach for St. Thomas University, a position he has held since 2026.

== Playing career ==
Andrew Hilton Davis was born on January 22, 1993, in Bonita Springs, Florida, to Butch Davis and Tammy Davis. Davis's father was an American football coach.

Davis began playing football in second grade as a wide receiver before switching to quarterback in middle school.

Davis attended East Chapel Hill High School in Chapel Hill, North Carolina, where his father served as the University of North Carolina's head football coach. His high school football head coach was Bill Renner, the father of Davis's future teammate, Bryn Renner. Davis missed half of his junior season with a shoulder injury before throwing for 3,525 yards and 30 touchdowns in eleven games his senior year.

In June 2012, Davis enrolled in summer school at the University of North Carolina as a walk-on quarterback under new head coach Larry Fedora, who succeeded Davis's father. He took a redshirt his freshman year before ultimately transferring from North Carolina to Coffeyville, a junior college in Kansas. After one season, he transferred to Ole Miss, where he spent the remaining three years of his eligibility as a backup before graduating with a degree in general studies in 2016.

== Coaching career ==
In 2017, Davis began his coaching career under his father at FIU, who was in his first year as head coach. The younger Davis served as a graduate assistant before being promoted the following year to tight ends coach and passing game coordinator. He exited the program after his father wasn't retained after five years.

In 2022, Davis was hired as the quarterbacks coach for National Association of Intercollegiate Athletics (NAIA) program St. Thomas (FL) under Bill Rychel. After four years in 2025, Rychel resigned, and Davis was promoted to head coach for the 2026 season.

== Personal life ==
Davis's father, Butch Davis, served as the head football coach for Miami (FL), North Carolina, FIU, and the Cleveland Browns of the National Football League (NFL).

== Head coaching record ==
Year	Team	Overall	Conference	Standing	Bowl/playoffs
St. Thomas Bobcats (Sun Conference) (2026–present)
2026	St. Thomas	10–0	6–0		
St. Thomas:		0–0	0–0		
Total:		0–0			
