= Don Odle =

American sports coach (1920–2002)

Biographical details
- Born: May 12, 1920; Muncie, Indiana, U.S.
- Died: March 7, 2002 (aged 81); Muncie, Indiana, U.S.

Playing career

Basketball
- 1938–1942: Taylor
- 1943–1944: Elwood Rexall Drugs
- 1943–1944: Indianapolis Pure Oils
- 1944–1945: Anderson Forse All-Stars
- 1945–1946: Aurora Merchants
- 1947–1948: Marion Draper Dodges

Baseball
- 1939–1942: Taylor

Coaching career (HC unless noted)

Football
- 1946–1947: Aurora HS (IN)
- 1948: Taylor
- 1951: Taylor

Basketball
- 1943–1945: Frankton HS (IN)
- 1945–1947: Aurora HS (IN)
- 1948–1979: Taylor
- 1960: Taiwan

Track and field
- 1945–1947: Aurora HS (IN)

Head coaching record
- Overall: 3–11 (college football)

Donald James Odle (May 12, 1920 – March 7, 2002) was an American football, basketball, baseball, and golf coach. He served as at the head football coach at Taylor University in 1948 and 1951, and as the school's head basketball coach, amassing nearly 500 victories from 1948 to 1979. Odle also coached baseball and golf at Taylor.

Odle was born on May 12, 1920, in Muncie, Indiana, to Morton P. and Mariah Woodland Odle. He graduated from Selma High School, in Selma, Indiana, in 1938. He then attended Taylor University, where he played multiples sports before graduating in 1942. Olde earned a Master of Arts degree from Indiana University Bloomington in 1947. He began his coaching career at the high school level, coaching basketball in Aurora and Frankton, Indiana.

Odle was the youngest of nine children. He married Bonnie Weaver in 1944. They had two children. Odle died on March 7, 2002, at Ball Memorial Hospital in Muncie.

== Head coaching record ==
=== College football ===
Year	Team	Overall	Conference	Standing	Bowl/playoffs
Taylor Trojans (Independent) (1948)
1948	Taylor	0–8			
Taylor Trojans (Hoosier Conference) (1951)
1951	Taylor	3–5	3–3	T–3rd	
Taylor:		3–11	3–3		
Total:		3–11			
