= Aaron Mingo =

American college football coach

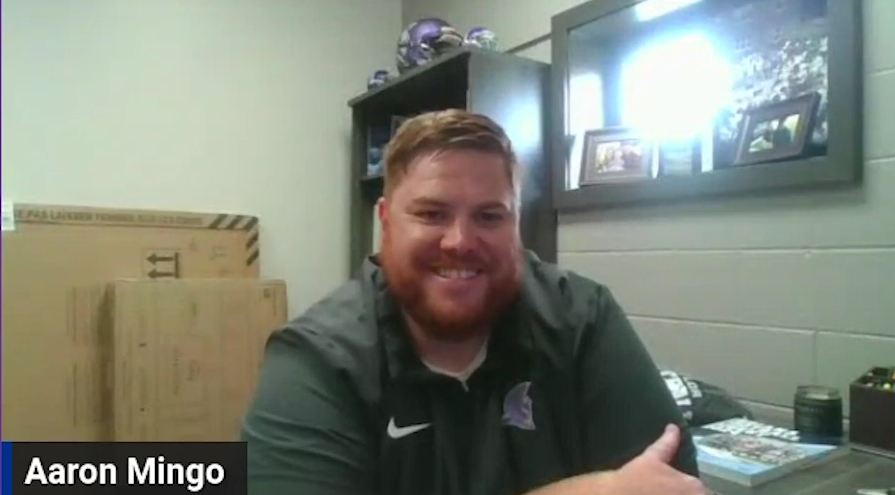
- Mingo in 2024

Current position
- Title: Head coach
- Team: Taylor
- Conference: MSFA
- Record: 26–28

Coaching career (HC unless noted)
- 2009–2012: Greenville (OL/RC)
- 2013–2015: Bluefield (OC)
- 2016–2020: Dordt (OL/OL/RC)
- 2021–present: Taylor

Head coaching record
- Overall: 26–28

Aaron Mingo is an American college football coach. He is the head football coach for Taylor University, a position he has held since 2021. Mingo previously served as an offensive coordinator and assistant coach at Dordt University, Bluefield University, and Greenville University.

== Coaching career ==
Mingo began his coaching career at his alma mater, Greenville University in Greenville, Illinois, where he served as the offensive line coach and recruiting coordinator from 2009 to 2012. During his four seasons at Greenville, the program secured three conference championships. He then moved to Bluefield University in Bluefield, Virginia, where he was the offensive coordinator for three seasons (2013–2015). From 2016 to 2020, Mingo served as the offensive coordinator, offensive line coach, and recruiting coordinator at Dordt University in Sioux Center, Iowa. Under his guidance, the Dordt offense averaged nearly 38 points per game over five seasons. In his final season in 2020, the team averaged 43 points and 532.6 yards per game, including 320 rushing yards per game, ranking second in the NAIA in total offense and rushing offense.

== Taylor ==
Mingo was named the 14th head football coach at Taylor University on May 28, 2021. He inherited a program that had struggled in recent years and was hired by Athletic Director Kyle Gould, who praised Mingo's "discipleship-infused coaching philosophy, recruiting acumen and success." In his fourth season at the helm in 2024, Mingo led the Trojans to a historic 9–2 overall record. This marked the program's first winning season since 2015 and matched the largest regular-season turnaround in the NAIA (a seven-win improvement from the 2–9 record in 2023). The 2024 team, which finished ranked No. 22 in the NAIA Top 25 poll, set numerous program records, including: scoring average (48.4 points per game), total yards per game (486.4), rushing yards per game (311.7), total touchdowns (75), and total points scored (532). Following the season, Mingo was named the American Football Coaches Association (AFCA) NAIA Region 2 Coach of the Year and the Mid-States Football Association (MSFA) Mideast League Coach of the Year. The 9–2 record was the second-highest single-season win total in Taylor football's 77-year history. His offensive philosophy is described as a "hard-nosed, run-first" approach, often utilizing a variation of the triple option offense.

== Head coaching record ==
Year	Team	Overall	Conference	Standing	Bowl/playoffs	NAIA^{#}
Taylor Trojans (Mid-States Football Association) (2021–present)
2021	Taylor	3–7	2–5	T–6th (MEL)		
2022	Taylor	5–6	3–4	5th (MEL)		
2023	Taylor	2–9	1–6	7th (MEL)		
2024	Taylor	9–2	4–1	2nd (MEL)		25
2025	Taylor	7–4	4–1	2nd (MEL)		
2026	Taylor	0–0	0–0	(MEL)		
Taylor:		26–28	14–17			
Total:		26–28				
^{#}Rankings from final NAIA Coaches' Poll.
