= Avante Mitchell =

American football coach (born 1979)

Current position
- Title: Head coach
- Team: Olivet Nazarene
- Conference: MSFA
- Record: 12–8

Biographical details
- Born: December 1979 (age 46); Detroit, Michigan, U.S.
- Education: Wayne State University; Northwood University

Coaching career (HC unless noted)
- 2011: Concordia (MI) (LB/DL)
- 2012: Concordia (MI) (interim HC)
- 2013–2015: Taylor (DC/ST)
- 2016–2018: Northwood (DB)
- 2019: Lawrence Tech (DC)
- 2020–2023: Lawrence Tech
- 2024–present: Olivet Nazarene

Head coaching record
- Overall: 25–37

Avante Mitchell (born c. December 1979) is an American college football coach. He is the head football coach for Olivet Nazarene University, a position he has held since 2024. He was the head football coach for Lawrence Technological University from 2020 to 2023. He was the interim head football coach for Concordia University Ann Arbor in 2012. He also coached for Taylor and Northwood.

== Head coaching record ==
| Year | Team | Overall | Conference | Standing | Bowl/playoffs |
|---|---|---|---|---|---|
Concordia Cardinals (Mid-States Football Association) (2012)
| 2012 | Concordia | 0–9 | 0–5 | 6th (MEL) | |
| Concordia: | | 0–9 | 0–5 | | |
Lawrence Tech Blue Devils (Mid-States Football Association) (2020–2023)
| 2020–21 | Lawrence Tech | 0–2 | 0–1 | 6th (MEL) | |
| 2021 | Lawrence Tech | 7–4 | 3–4 | 5th (MEL) | |
| 2022 | Lawrence Tech | 3–7 | 2–5 | T–6th (MEL) | |
| 2023 | Lawrence Tech | 3–7 | 2–5 | 6th (MEL) | |
| Lawrence Tech: | | 13–20 | 7–15 | | |
Olivet Nazarene Tigers (Mid-States Football Association) (2024–present)
| 2024 | Olivet Nazarene | 6–4 | 3–2 | T–3rd (MWL) | |
| 2025 | Olivet Nazarene | 6–4 | 3–3 | 4th (MWL) | |
| 2026 | Olivet Nazarene | 0–0 | 0–0 | (MWL) | |
| Olivet Nazarene: | | 12–8 | 6–5 | | |
| Total: | | 25–37 | | | |
