= Doug Socha =

American football coach

Current position
- Title: Head coach
- Team: Lenoir–Rhyne
- Conference: SAC
- Record: 16–8

Biographical details
- Born: (born c. 1975); North Tonawanda, New York, U.S.
- Education: California State University, Northridge (1999)

Playing career
- 1993–1994: Los Angeles Valley
- 1995–1996: Mesa State
- Position: Defensive back

Coaching career (HC unless noted)
- 1997: Grand Junction HS (CO) (DB)
- 1998–1999: College of the Canyons (DB)
- 2000: Buffalo (GA)
- 2001–2005: Buffalo (WR, Recruiting Coordinator)
- 2006–2009: American Heritage (FL) (OC)
- 2010–2011: American Heritage (FL)
- 2012–2015: Oxbridge Academy (FL)
- 2016: Buffalo Bills (Asst. RB's)
- 2017–2023: Keiser
- 2024–present: Lenoir–Rhyne

Head coaching record
- Overall: 70–23 (college); 51–12 (high school)
- Tournaments: 1–1 (NCAA D-II playoffs); 11–5 (NAIA playoffs)

Accomplishments and honors

Championships
- 1 NAIA (2023); 2 TSC (2022–2023); 3 MSC Sun Division (2019–2021); 1 Florida Class 3A (2011)

Doug Socha (born c. 1975) is an American football coach. He is the head football coach for Lenoir–Rhyne University, a position he has held since 2024. Socha led the Keiser Seahawks to back-to-back NAIA Football National Championship title games in 2022 and 2023: winning in 2023.

== Playing career and education ==
Socha played college football for Los Angeles Valley College and Mesa State as a defensive back. In 1999, he graduated from California State University, Northridge.

== Coaching career ==
In 1997, Socha was an assistant football coach for Grand Junction High School. From 1998 to 1999 Socha was the defensive backs coach for the College of the Canyons. In 2000, Socha joined Buffalo as a graduate assistant before becoming the team's wide receivers coach from 2001 to 2005.

Socha spent four years—2006 to 2009—as the offensive coordinator for American Heritage School in Delray Beach, Florida, before being promoted to head football coach in 2010. In August 2012, Socha was hired as the inaugural head football coach for Oxbridge Academy in West Palm Beach, Florida. He held that position until 2015 when his contract with the school expired.

In 2016, Socha coached for the Buffalo Bills of the National Football League (NFL) as an offensive assistant with the running backs.

in 2017, Socha was hired as the first head football coach for Keiser.

In the team's first varsity season in 2018, Socha led the team to a 6–4 record and third in the Mid-South Conference's (MSC) Sun Division. From 2019 to 2021 he led the team to three-consecutive nine-win seasons and three-consecutive Sun Division championships. In 2019, the team went 9–1, made their first-ever appearance in the NAIA playoffs, and received a final ranking of nine in the NAIA poll. The following season, in 2020, he led the team to another 9–1 record including a trip to the NAIA semifinal and a final ranking of four. Despite the season being shortened to six weeks due to COVID-19, Socha's Seahawks had not lost a conference game since his first season. In 2021, the team went 9–3 and made it to the quarterfinal in the playoffs. Prior to the 2022 season, Keiser announced that it was transitioning conferences and would now compete in the Sun Conference (TSC). In their first season, he led the team to a 9–4 record and a perfect 6–0 record in the conference. The team made their deepest playoff push in school history as they made it to the 2022 NAIA Football National Championship. They ultimately lost to Northwestern (IA) 35–25. The following year the team bounced back and finished with a program-best 12–2 record with their two losses coming against NCAA Division II teams. The team once again won TSC and made their second-straight NAIA Championship appearance. This time, they won and defeated Northwestern (IA) 31–21. After the season, Socha resigned and ended his tenure with a 54–15 record overall and five division or conference championships in six total seasons.

In 2024, Socha was hired as the head football coach for Lenoir–Rhyne, an NCAA Division II program.

== Head coaching record ==
=== College ===
Year	Team	Overall	Conference	Standing	Bowl/playoffs	AFCA^{#}	D2/NAIA^{°}
Keiser Seahawks (Mid-South Conference) (2018–2021)
2018	Keiser	6–4	4–2	3rd (Sun)			
2019	Keiser	9–1	6–0	1st (Sun)	L NAIA First Round		9
2020	Keiser	9–1	5–0	1st (Sun)	L NAIA Semifinal		4
2021	Keiser	9–3	5–1	1st (Sun)	L NAIA Quarterfinal		11
Keiser Seahawks (Sun Conference) (2022–2023)
2022	Keiser	9–4	6–0	1st	L NAIA Championship		
2023	Keiser	12–2	7–0	1st	W NAIA Championship		3
Keiser:		54–15	33–3				
Lenoir–Rhyne Bears (South Atlantic Conference) (2024–present)
2024	Lenoir–Rhyne	10–3	7–2	T–2nd (Piedmont)	L NCAA Division II Second Round	16	21
2025	Lenoir–Rhyne	6–5	5–4	T–5th			
2026	Lenoir–Rhyne	1–0	0–0				
Lenoir–Rhyne:		17–8	12–6				
Total:		71–23					
National championship Conference title Conference division title or championship game berth

=== High school ===
Year	Team	Overall	Conference	Standing	Bowl/playoffs
American Heritage Stallions () (2010–2011)
2010	American Heritage	10–4	4–0	1st	State Runner-Up
2011	American Heritage	12–2	5–0	1st	State Champion
American Heritage:		22–6	9–0		
Oxbridge Academy ThunderWolves () (2012–2015)
2012	Oxbridge Academy	0–1	0–0		
2013	Oxbridge Academy	10–2	4–0	1st	State Champion
2014	Oxbridge Academy	10–1	8–0	1st	State Champion
2015	Oxbridge Academy	9–3	2–0	1st	Lost in 2nd Round
Oxbridge Academy:		29–7	14–0		
Total:		51–12			
National championship Conference title Conference division title or championship game berth
