= Joe Curry (American football) =

American football coach (born 1978)

Current position
- Title: Head coach
- Team: St. Francis (IL)
- Conference: MSFA
- Record: 74–70

Biographical details
- Born: June 1, 1978 (age 48); Aurora, Illinois, U.S.
- Education: University of St. Francis (2001); Ferris State University

Playing career
- 1996–1997: Indiana State
- 1998–2000: St. Francis (IL)
- Position: Defensive end

Coaching career (HC unless noted)
- 2001: St. Francis (IL) (DL)
- 2002–2004: Ferris State (DL)
- 2005–2011: St. Francis (IL) (DC)
- 2012–present: St. Francis (IL)

Head coaching record
- Overall: 74–70

Accomplishments and honors

Championships
- 2 MSFA Midwest League (2015, 2021)

Joe Curry (born June 1, 1978) is an American college football coach. He is the head football coach for the University of St. Francis, a position he has held since 2012. He also coached for Ferris State. He played college football for Indiana State and St. Francis (Illinois) as a defensive end.

== Head coaching record ==
Year	Team	Overall	Conference	Standing	Bowl/playoffs	NAIA Coaches'^{#}
St. Francis Fighting Saints (Mid-States Football Association) (2012–present)
2012	St. Francis	6–5	3–3	4th (MWL)		
2013	St. Francis	7–4	4–2	T–2nd (MEL)		21
2014	St. Francis	4–7	1–5	6th (MEL)		
2015	St. Francis	8–3	4–1	T–1st (MWL)		18
2016	St. Francis	5–6	2–3	T–3rd (MWL)		
2017	St. Francis	5–5	4–1	2nd (MWL)		
2018	St. Francis	4–7	2–3	4th (MWL)		
2019	St. Francis	3–8	2–4	5th (MWL)		
2020–21	St. Francis	2–6	2–4	5th (MWL)		
2021	St. Francis	6–3	6–1	T–1st (MWL)		
2022	St. Francis	7–3	6–1	2nd (MWL)		23
2023	St. Francis	7–3	3–3	4th (MWL)		
2024	St. Francis	7–3	3–2	T–3rd (MWL)		
2025	St. Francis	3–7	1–4	T–5th (MWL)		
2026	St. Francis	0–0	0–0	(MWL)		
St. Francis:		74–70	43–37			
Total:		74–70				
National championship Conference title Conference division title or championship game berth
