= WCSF =

- Joliet, Illinois; United States
- Frequency: 88.7 MHz
- Branding: 88.7 WCSF

Programming
- Format: Indie rock

Ownership
- Owner: University of St. Francis; (College of St. Francis)

History
- First air date: 1988
- Call sign meaning: College of St. Francis

Technical information
- Licensing authority: FCC
- Facility ID: 12283
- Class: A
- ERP: 100 watts
- HAAT: 39 meters (128 ft)
- Transmitter coordinates: 41°31′58.00″N 88°5′54.00″W

Links
- Public license information: Public file; LMS
- Webcast: Listen live
- Website: www.wcsfradio.com

WCSF (88.7 FM) is a radio station based in Joliet, Illinois broadcasting an eclectic college radio music format for most of the year, switching to Christmas music from Thanksgiving through New Year's Day. The station is licensed to the University of St. Francis. The school was known as the College of St. Francis until 1998, and the broadcast license is still held in that name.
