= Ross Cimpl =

American football coach (born c. 1985)

Current position
- Title: Athletic director
- Team: Dakota Wesleyan
- Conference: GPAC

Biographical details
- Born: c. 1985 (age 40–41)
- Education: University of Sioux Falls (2007, 2010)

Playing career
- 2003–2006: Sioux Falls

Coaching career (HC unless noted)
- 2007–2009: Sioux Falls (assistant)
- 2010–2011: Dakota Wesleyan (DC)
- 2012–2023: Dakota Wesleyan

Administrative career (AD unless noted)
- 2023–2024: Dakota Wesleyan (interim AD)
- 2024–present: Dakota Wesleyan

Head coaching record
- Overall: 65–63

Ross Cimpl (born c. 1985) is an American college football coach. He is the athletic director for Dakota Wesleyan University, a position he has held since 2024 after being the head football coach from 2012 to 2023. He also coached and played for Sioux Falls.

== Head coaching record ==
| Year | Team | Overall | Conference | Standing | Bowl/playoffs | NAIA Coaches'^{#} |
|---|---|---|---|---|---|---|
Dakota Wesleyan Tigers (Great Plains Athletic Conference) (2012–2023)
| 2012 | Dakota Wesleyan | 6–4 | 5–4 | T–4th | | |
| 2013 | Dakota Wesleyan | 8–3 | 7–2 | T–2nd | | 20 |
| 2014 | Dakota Wesleyan | 7–4 | 5–4 | T–4th | | |
| 2015 | Dakota Wesleyan | 9–2 | 7–2 | 3rd | | 15 |
| 2016 | Dakota Wesleyan | 8–3 | 6–2 | 3rd | | 16 |
| 2017 | Dakota Wesleyan | 6–5 | 4–4 | T–4th | | |
| 2018 | Dakota Wesleyan | 2–9 | 1–8 | 10th | | |
| 2019 | Dakota Wesleyan | 3–8 | 2–7 | T–8th | | |
| 2020–21 | Dakota Wesleyan | 4–5 | 4–5 | 6th | | |
| 2021 | Dakota Wesleyan | 4–7 | 4–6 | 7th | | |
| 2022 | Dakota Wesleyan | 2–9 | 2–8 | T–9th | | |
| 2023 | Dakota Wesleyan | 6–5 | 5–5 | T–4th | | |
| Dakota Wesleyan: | | 65–63 | 52–58 | | | |
| Total: | | 65–63 | | | | |
