= 2023 Northwestern Red Raiders football team =

American college football season

2023 Northwestern Red Raiders football

GPAC champion

NAIA Championship Game, L 21–31 vs. Keiser
- Conference: Great Plains Athletic Conference
- Record: 14–1 (10–0 GPAC)
- Head coach: Matt McCarty (8th season)
- Offensive coordinator: Josh Fakkema (1st season)
- Defensive coordinator: Billy Kirch (8th season)
- Home stadium: Korver Field at De Valois Stadium

2023 Great Plains Athletic Conference football standings
	Conf.			Overall
Team	W		L	W		L
No. 1 Northwestern (IA) $^	10	–	0	14	–	1
No. 14 Dordt ^	8	–	2	9	–	3
No. T–10 Morningside ^	8	–	2	9	–	3
Dakota Wesleyan	5	–	5	6	–	5
Midland	5	–	5	6	–	5
Concordia (NE)	5	–	5	5	–	5
Hastings	4	–	6	5	–	6
Briar Cliff	4	–	6	4	–	7
Mount Marty	2	–	8	3	–	8
Doane	2	–	8	2	–	9
Jamestown	2	–	8	3	–	8
$ – Conference champion; ^ – NAIA playoff participant; Rankings from NAIA Coaches' Poll

The 2023 Northwestern Red Raiders football team is an American football team that represented Northwestern College of Orange City, Iowa, as a member of the Great Plains Athletic Conference (GPAC) during the 2023 NAIA football season. In their eighth year under head coach Matt McCarty, the Red Raiders compiled a 14–1 record (10–0 against conference opponents), won the GPAC championship, and were ranked No. 1 among all NAIA programs at the end of the regular season.

The Red Raiders advanced to the NAIA football playoffs where they received a bye in the first round and defeated Dordt Defenders (7-0) in the second round, the Saint Xavier Cougars (34-17) in the quarterfinals, and the GeorgetownTigers in the semifinals. Northwestern lost to Keiser in the NAIA Championship Game on December 18 by a score of 31 to 21.

The 2022 team won the NAIA championship, and the Red Raiders compiled a 28-game winning streak dating back to the second game of the 2022 season.

Key players on the 2023 team include junior quarterback and co-captain Jalyn Gramstad, senior running back and co-captain Konner McQuillan, and senior wide receiver Michael Storey. Gramstad was named 2023 GPAC Offensive Player of the Year, and Matt McCarty was named GPAC Coach of the Year. A total of nine Northwestern players received first-team honors on the All-GPAC team, including Gramstad, McQuillen, and Storey, as well as offensive linemen Jawan Grant and Patrick Gottburg, long snapper Ty Shafer, defensive lineman Jacob Dragstra, linebacker Ben Egli, and defensive back Cody Moser.

== Schedule ==
Date	Time	Opponent	Rank	Site	Result	Attendance	Source
September 2	1:00 p.m.	at Concordia (NE)	No. 1	Bulldog Stadium; Seward, NE	W 48–35	1,800	
September 9	6:00 p.m.	at Drake*	No. 1	Drake Stadium; Des Moines, IA	W 27–24 ^{OT}	3,526	
September 16	1:00 p.m.	Doane	No. 1	Korver Field at De Valois Stadium; Orange City, IA	W 51–7		
September 23	7:00 p.m.	at Mount Marty	No. 1	Crane Youngworth Stadium; Yankton, SD	W 42–0	1,693	
September 30	1:00 p.m.	at Midland	No. 1	Heedum Field; Fremont, NE	W 42–21		
October 7	1:30 p.m.	Hastings	No. 1	Korver Field at De Valois Stadium; Orange City, IA	W 45–7		
October 14	1:00 p.m.	at Briar Cliff	No. 1	Memorial Field; Sioux City, IA	W 37–8		
October 21	1:00 p.m.	No. 22 Dordt	No. 1	Korver Field at De Valois Stadium; Orange City, IA	W 35–14		
October 28	1:00 p.m.	No. 3 Morningside	No. 1	Korver Field at De Valois Stadium; Orange City, IA	W 34–20		
November 4	1:00 p.m.	at Dakota Wesleyan	No. 1	Joe Quintal Field; Mitchell, SD	W 49–28		
November 11	12:00 p.m.	Jamestown	No. 1	Korver Field at De Valois Stadium; Orange City, IA	W 40–11		
November 25	12:00 p.m.	No. 14 Dordt*	No. 1	Korver Field at De Valois Stadium; Orange City, IA (NAIA second round)	W 7–0		
December 2	1:00 p.m.	No. 12 Saint Xavier (IL)*	No. 1	Korver Field at De Valois Stadium; Orange City, IA (NAIA quarterfinal)	W 34–17		
December 9	12:00 p.m.	No. 4 Georgetown (KY)*	No. 1	Korver Field at De Valois Stadium; Orange City, IA (NAIA semifinal)	W 35–10		
December 18	11:00 a.m.	vs. No. 3 Keiser*	No. 1	Durham County Memorial Stadium; Durham, NC (NAIA Championship Game)	L 21–31		
*Non-conference game; Rankings from NAIA Poll released prior to the game; All times are in Central time
