= Keidron Smith =

American football player (born 1999)

No. 33 – Chicago Bears
- Position: Safety
- Roster status: Practice squad

Personal information
- Born: November 1, 1999 (age 27); Boca Raton, Florida, U.S.
- Listed height: 6 ft 2 in (1.88 m)
- Listed weight: 210 lb (95 kg)

Career information
- High school: Oxbridge Academy (West Palm Beach, Florida)
- College: Ole Miss (2018–2021); Kentucky (2022)
- NFL draft: 2023: undrafted

Career history
- Miami Dolphins (2023)*; Washington Commanders (2023)*; Denver Broncos (2023–2025); New York Jets (2025); Atlanta Falcons (2026)*; Chicago Bears (2026–present)*
- * Offseason or practice squad member only

Awards and highlights
- Second team All-SEC (2022)

Career NFL statistics as of 2024
- Total tackles: 7
- Stats at Pro Football Reference

Keidron Ameer Smith (/kiːˈdrɑːn/ kee-DRAHN; born November 1, 1999) is an American professional football safety for the Chicago Bears of the National Football League (NFL). He played college football for the Ole Miss Rebels and Kentucky Wildcats and was signed by the Miami Dolphins as an undrafted free agent in 2023. He has also played for the Denver Broncos and New York Jets.

== Early life ==
Smith was born on November 1, 1999, in Boca Raton, Florida. He grew up in West Palm Beach. He attended Oxbridge Academy in West Palm Beach, where he was a standout football and basketball player. He helped Oxbridge reach the state championship game as a senior and finished with career totals of seven interceptions and five touchdowns. He was named The Palm Beach Post's 2017 defensive player of the year. In basketball, he scored over 1,000 points in his career. A three-star recruit, he committed to play college football for the Ole Miss Rebels.

== College career ==
As a freshman at Ole Miss in 2018, Smith appeared in all 12 games while recording 47 tackles and four pass breakups. He started eight games in 2019 as a sophomore, totaling 48 tackles, 3.5 tackles-for-loss (TFLs) and a team-leading eight pass breakups. In 2020, he played in 10 games and recorded 64 tackles, six passes defended and an interception. For the 2021 season, Smith switched his position from cornerback to safety. He started seven games while appearing in all 13 in 2021, ending with 64 tackles, 2.5 TFLs, three pass breakups and two interceptions. He won the Chucky Mullins Courage Award for being the "Ole Miss upperclassman defensive player that embodies the spirit of Mullins – courage, leadership, perseverance, and determination".

Smith entered the NCAA transfer portal following the 2021 season, using an extra year of eligibility granted to all players due to the COVID-19 pandemic. He ended his stint at Ole Miss having made 224 tackles, 21 passes defended, five interceptions and five forced fumbles. He ultimately transferred to the Kentucky Wildcats for his final season of college football. With the Wildcats, he played all 13 games, 12 as a starter, and recorded 46 tackles, five passes defended and two interceptions, being named second-team All-Southeastern Conference (SEC). At the conclusion of his collegiate career, he was invited to the NFLPA Collegiate Bowl, and after impressing there, was selected for the 2023 Senior Bowl.

== Professional career ==
Pre-draft measurables
Height	Weight	Arm length	Hand span	Wingspan	40-yard dash	10-yard split	20-yard split	20-yard shuttle	Three-cone drill	Vertical jump	Broad jump	Bench press
6 ft 2 in (1.88 m)	201 lb (91 kg)	31 1/4 in (0.79 m)	9 1/4 in (0.23 m)	6 ft 5 1/4 in (1.96 m)	4.61 s	1.64 s	2.59 s	4.31 s	7.19 s	36.0 in (0.91 m)	10 ft 6 in (3.20 m)	14 reps
All values from Pro Day

=== Miami Dolphins ===
After going unselected in the 2023 NFL draft, Smith signed with the Miami Dolphins as an undrafted free agent. Although he was reported to have impressed in preseason, he was released on August 28, 2023, as part of the final roster cuts.

=== Washington Commanders ===
On September 6, 2023, Smith signed with the practice squad of the Washington Commanders. He was released from the practice squad on October 9.

=== Denver Broncos ===
Smith signed with the Denver Broncos practice squad on December 19, 2023. He was released on December 26, to make room for the waived Kareem Jackson, but was re-signed one day later after Jackson was claimed by the Houston Texans. He signed a reserve/future contract with Denver after the season, on January 9, 2024. After impressing in the 2024 preseason, Smith made the team's 53-man roster on August 27. He was waived on November 12, and signed to the practice squad two days later. Smith signed a reserve/future contract with the Broncos on January 13, 2025.

On August 26, 2025, Smith was waived by the Broncos yet again. He was re-signed to the practice squad the next day.

=== New York Jets ===
On December 15, 2025, Smith was signed by the New York Jets off of the Broncos' practice squad, reuniting him with general manager Darren Mougey.

On August 5, 2026, Smith was waived by the Jets.

=== Atlanta Falcons ===
On August 6, 2026, Smith was claimed off waivers by the Atlanta Falcons. He was waived by the Falcons on August 29.

=== Chicago Bears ===
On September 9, 2026, Smith signed to the Chicago Bears' practice squad. He was released by Chicago on September 12. On September 18, Smith was re-signed to the Bears' practice squad.
