= Vince Fillipp =

American football coach (born c. 1986)

Current position
- Title: Head coach
- Team: St. Ambrose
- Conference: HAAC
- Record: 10–32

Biographical details
- Born: c. 1986 (age 39–40); Cary, Illinois, U.S.
- Education: St. Ambrose University (2009, 2011)

Playing career
- 2005–2008: St. Ambrose
- Position: Defensive lineman

Coaching career (HC unless noted)
- 2009–2012: St. Ambrose (DL)
- 2013: Earlham (DL)
- 2014–2016: Kansas Wesleyan (DC)
- 2017–2020: St. Ambrose (DC)
- 2021: St. Ambrose (AHC/DC)
- 2022–present: St. Ambrose

Head coaching record
- Overall: 10–32

Accomplishments and honors

Awards
- 2× First-Team All-MSFA (2007–2008)

Vince Fillipp (born c. 1986) is an American college football coach. He is the head football coach for St. Ambrose University, a position he has held since 2022. He also coached for Earlham and Kansas Wesleyan. He played college football for St. Ambrose as a defensive lineman.

== Head coaching record ==
Year	Team	Overall	Conference	Standing	Bowl/playoffs
St. Ambrose Fighting Bees (Mid-States Football Association) (2022–2023)
2022	St. Ambrose	2–8	2–5	T–5th (MWL)	
2023	St. Ambrose	1–9	1–4	5th (MWL)	
St. Ambrose Fighting Bees (Heart of America Athletic Conference) (2024–present)
2024	St. Ambrose	3–8	1–5	6th (North)	
2025	St. Ambrose	4–7	3–3	T–3rd (North)	
2026	St. Ambrose	0–0	0–0	(North)	
St. Ambrose:		10–32	7–17		
Total:		10–32			
