= Oxbridge Academy (Florida) =

Oxbridge Academy Foundation, Inc.
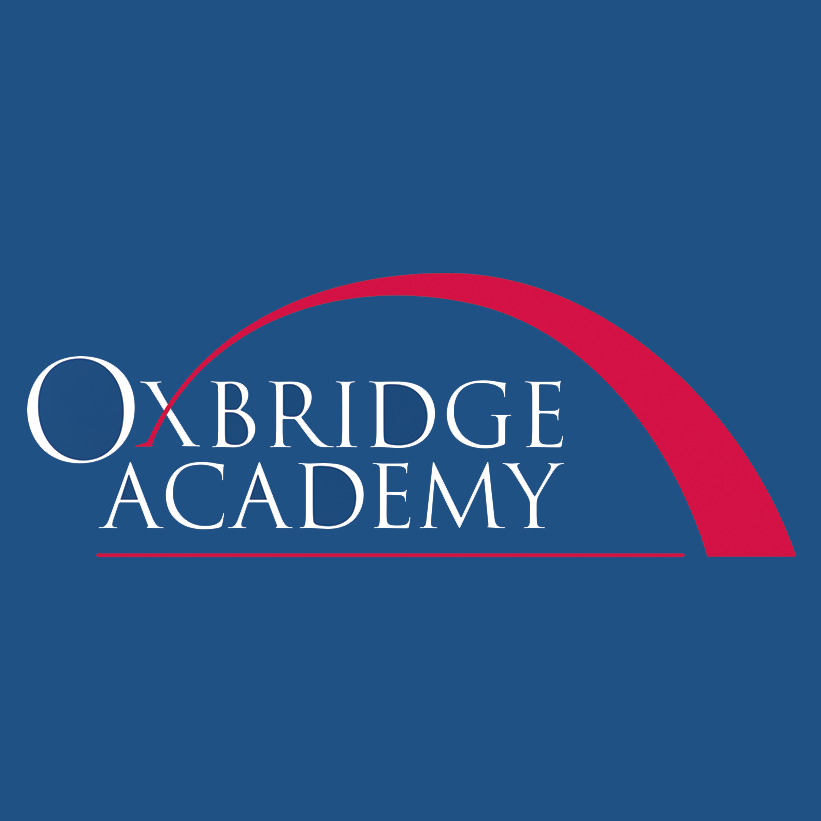

Location
- 3151 North Military Trail; West Palm Beach, Florida; United States; 26.7234°N 80.1125°W

Information
- Type: Private, day, college preparatory school
- Motto: For A Lifetime
- Religious affiliation: Nonsectarian
- Established: 2011
- Founder: William L. Koch
- NCES School ID: A1501048
- Principal: Ralph Maurer
- Faculty: 62
- Grades: 6–12
- Gender: Co-educational
- Enrollment: 520 (2019)
- Student to teacher ratio: 10:1
- Campus size: 54 acres
- Campus type: Suburban
- Colors: Red, White, Navy Blue
- Athletics conference: Florida High School Athletic Association (FHSAA)
- Mascot: Thunderwolf
- Nickname: Thunderwolves
- Publication: Oxbridge Today
- School fees: New student: $1,575; Annual student fee: $2,500
- Tuition: Middle school: $34,500; Upper school: $41,500
- Website: www.oapb.org

Oxbridge Academy is a private, coeducational, college-preparatory middle and high school in West Palm Beach, Florida, United States. The school, managed by the Oxbridge Academy Foundation, Inc., serves grades 6–12.

== History ==
The school was established in 2011 with a $50 million donation from Bill Koch. Koch's goal was to create a school for his own children where academically gifted students of all socioeconomic backgrounds could do hands-on projects and learn by problem solving, a place where students ruled. Oxbridge was opened in under a year on a 45-acre campus that once held a Jewish community center. By 2016, Koch had donated more than $75 million to the school.

By 2014, the school added a football team at the request of the student body. In April 2016, Koch announced that Academic Dean John Klemme would serve as the School's president, placing Robert Parsons on paid leave pending an investigation of harassment claims. Parsons' compensation package was worth $1 million, with an annual salary of about $600,000 per year.

On May 27, 2016, Koch fired Parsons and declined to renew the contracts of director of athletics Craig Sponsky and the football coach Doug Socha; Koch noted that a "power elites group" in the school "ran the asylum".

In July 2016, David Rosow was elected president and CEO of Oxbridge Academy.

On June 20, 2018, the school announced that it was ending its football program after a number of its players transferred to other schools. The program was revived for the 2023–24 school year.

== Athletics recruiting violations ==
In 2016, the school self-reported athletic recruiting violations and forfeited all athletic victories for the previous two years, including three FHSAA district championships.

== Notable alumni ==
- Travis Homer – class of 2016, NFL player for the Pittsburgh Steelers
- Keidron Smith – class of 2018, NFL player for the New York Jets
- Barron Trump – class of 2024, son of 45th and 47th President of the United States Donald Trump
