= Chris Bessler =

American football coach (born c. 1973)

Current position
- Title: Defensive coordinator & defensive line coach
- Team: Dakota Wesleyan
- Conference: GPAC

Biographical details
- Born: c. 1973 (age 52–53)
- Education: Doane College (1995); Northern State University (2001)

Playing career

Football
- 1991–1994: Doane

Baseball
- 1991–1994: Doane

Track and field
- 1991–1994: Doane
- Position: Linebacker (football)

Coaching career (HC unless noted)

Football
- 1995: Doane (SA)
- 1996–1999: Cozad HS (NE)
- 2000: Northern State (assistant)
- 2001–2002: Augustana (IL) (DL)
- 2003–2006: MICDS (MO) (assistant)
- 2007–2017: Doane (DC/ILB)
- 2018–2023: Doane
- 2024: Dakota Wesleyan (DC/LB)
- 2025–present: Dakota Wesleyan (DC/DL)

Head coaching record
- Overall: 23–36 (college)

Christopher Bessler (born c. 1973) is an American college football coach. He is the defensive coordinator and defensive line coach for Dakota Wesleyan University, positions he has held since 2024 and 2025, respectively. He was the head football coach for Doane University from 2018 to 2023 and Cozad High School from 1996 to 1999. He also coached for Northern State, Augustana (IL), and Mary Institute and St. Louis Country Day School. He played college football for Doane as a linebacker.

== Head coaching record ==
=== College ===
Year	Team	Overall	Conference	Standing	Bowl/playoffs
Doane Tigers (Great Plains Athletic Conference) (2018–2023)
2018	Doane	6–4	5–4	T–4th	
2019	Doane	4–7	4–5	T–5th	
2020–21	Doane	2–5	2–5	7th	
2021	Doane	5–5	5–5	6th	
2022	Doane	4–6	4–6	T–6th	
2023	Doane	2–9	2–8	T–9th	
Doane:		23–36	22–33		
Total:		23–36			
