= Matt McCarty (American football) =

American football coach

Current position
- Title: Head coach
- Team: Northwestern (IA)
- Conference: GPAC
- Record: 96–26

Biographical details
- Born: c. 1980 (age 45–46)

Playing career
- 2000–2003: Northwestern (IA)
- Position: Defensive back

Coaching career (HC unless noted)
- 2003–2004: Okoboji HS (IA) (assistant)
- 2005–2011: Northwestern (IA) (DC)
- 2012–2015: Northwestern (IA) (AHC/DC)
- 2016–present: Northwestern (IA)

Head coaching record
- Overall: 96–26
- Tournaments: 14–7 (NAIA playoffs)

Accomplishments and honors

Championships
- 1 NAIA (2022); 2 GPAC (2022, 2023)

Matt McCarty (born c. 1980) is an American college football coach. He is the head football coach for Northwestern College, a position he has held since 2016. McCarty led the Northwestern Red Raiders to the NAIA Football National Championship title in 2022.

McCarty played college football as a defensive back at Northwestern from 2000 to 2003.

== Head coaching record ==
Year	Team	Overall	Conference	Standing	Bowl/playoffs	NAIA^{#}
Northwestern Red Raiders (Great Plains Athletic Conference) (2016–present)
2016	Northwestern	3–7	3–5	6th		
2017	Northwestern	10–2	7–1	2nd	L NAIA Quarterfinal	8
2018	Northwestern	9–2	8–1	2nd	L NAIA First Round	12
2019	Northwestern	9–2	8–1	2nd	L NAIA First Round	10
2020–21	Northwestern	11–2	8–1	2nd	L NAIA Championship	2
2021	Northwestern	12–2	9–1	2nd	L NAIA Semifinal	4
2022	Northwestern	13–1	9–1	T–1st	W NAIA Championship	1
2023	Northwestern	14–1	10–0	1st	L NAIA Championship	1
2024	Northwestern	9–3	8–2	T–2nd	L NAIA Quarterfinal	10
2025	Northwestern	6–4	6–4	T–4th		
2026	Northwestern	0–0	0–0			
Northwestern:		96–26	76–17			
Total:		96–26				
National championship Conference title Conference division title or championship game berth
