= 2023 NAIA football national championship =

2023 NAIA Football National Championship
Northwestern Red Raiders	Keiser Seahawks
(14–0)	(11–2)
GPAC	TSC
21	31
Head coach: Matt McCarty	Head coach: Doug Socha
Seed 1	Seed 3
	1	2	3	4	Total
Northwestern	0	7	0	14	21
Keiser	7	10	7	7	31
- Date: December 18, 2023
- Season: 2023
- Stadium: Durham County Memorial Stadium
- Location: Durham, North Carolina
- MVP: Jaden Meizinger (RB, Keiser) (Offensive); Maddox Aprile (DL, Keiser) (Defensive)
- Referee: Brad Bunting
- Attendance: 1,183

The 2023 NAIA football national championship was a five-round, twenty team tournament played between November 18 and December 18, 2023. The tournament concluded with a single game, played as the 68th Annual NAIA Football National Championship.

The championship game was played at Durham County Memorial Stadium in Durham, North Carolina, between the undefeated 14–0 No. 1 Northwestern Red Raiders, representing Northwestern College from Orange City, Iowa, and the 11–2 No. 3 Keiser Seahawks, representing Keiser University from West Palm Beach, Florida. The game was played on December 18, 2023, with kickoff at 12:00 p.m. EST (11:00 a.m. local CST).

== Teams ==
=== Northwestern (IA) ===
The Northwestern Red Raiders, led by 8th-year head coach Matt McCarty, entered the national championship game as the No. 1 seed and defending national champions. They were seeking to win their fourth national championship overall, having won in 1973, 1983, and 2022. They entered the game 14–0, 10–0 in GPAC play.

2020 Northwestern (IA) Football
Sep. 2	at Concordia (NE)*	W 48–35
Sep. 9	Drake	W 27–24 (OT)
Sep. 16	Doane*	W 51–7
Sep. 23	at Mount Marty*	W 42–0
Sep. 30	at Midland*	W 42–21
Oct. 7	Hastings*	W 45–7
Oct. 14	at Briar Cliff*	W 37–8
Oct. 21	No. 22 Dordt*	W 35–14
Oct. 28	No. 3 Morningside*	W 34–20
Nov. 4	at Dakota Wesleyan*	W 49–28
Nov. 11	Jamestown*	W 40–11
NAIA Playoffs (No. 1 seed)
Nov. 25	No. 14 Dordt	W 7–0
Dec. 2	No. 12 Saint Xavier (IL)	W 34–17
Dec. 9	No. 4 Georgetown (KY)	W 35–10

=== Keiser ===
The Keiser Seahawks, led by 6th-year head coach Doug Socha, entered the national championship game as the No. 3 seed and were looking to win the program's first-ever NAIA National Championship. They entered the game 11–2, 7–0 in Sun Conference play.

2023 Keiser Football
Aug. 31	Mississippi College	L 14–17
Sep. 9	at No. 9 Lindsey Wilson	W 30–26
Sep. 16	at Valdosta State	L 25–49
Sep. 30	Thomas*	W 44–12
Oct. 7	No. 16 St. Thomas (FL)*	W 21–14
Oct. 14	at Warner*	W 69–6
Oct. 21	Southeastern*	W 51–21
Oct. 28	at Ave Maria*	W 54–7
Nov. 4	Webber International*	W 59–17
Nov. 11	at Florida Memorial*	W 44–13
NAIA Playoffs (No. 3 seed)
Nov. 25	No. 13 St. Thomas (FL)	W 45–21
Dec. 2	No. 7 Bethel (TN)	W 56–14
Dec. 9	No. 11 College of Idaho	W 28–21

=== Series history ===
No.	Date	Location	Winning team		Losing team	
1	December 17, 2022	Durham, NC	No. 3 Northwestern (IA)	35	No. 12 Keiser	25
Northwestern (IA) leads 1–0

== Game summary ==
2023 NAIA Football National Championship Game

Quarter	1	2	3	4	Total
No. 3 Keiser	7	10	7	7	31
No. 1 Northwestern (IA)	0	7	0	14	21

at Durham County Memorial Stadium • Durham, North Carolina

- Date: Monday, December 18, 2023
- Game time: 12:00 p.m. EST (11:00 a.m. CST)
- Game weather: • Temperature: 56 °F (13 °C) • Wind: Sunny
- Game attendance: 1,183
- Referee: Brad Bunting

Game information

First Quarter

- (14:49) UK – Jaden Meizinger 75-yard run, Nico Cavanillas kick (Drive: 1 plays, 75 yards, 0:11; Keiser 7–0)

Second Quarter

- (7:00) UK – Nico Cavanillas 31-yard field goal (Drive: 9 plays, 66 yards, 6:23; Keiser 10–0)
- (4:55) UK – Andrew Burnette 1-yard run, Nico Cavanillas kick (Drive: 4 plays, 14 yards, 1:14; Keiser 17–0)
- (0:29) NWC – Austyn Gerard 6-yard pass from Jalyn Gramstad, Eli Stader kick (Drive: 6 plays, 45 yards, 1:14; Keiser 17–7)

Third Quarter

- (5:17) UK – Maurico Porcha 30-yard pass from Justin Wake, Nico Cavanillas kick (Drive: 5 plays, 99 yards, 2:29; Keiser 24–7)

Fourth Quarter

- (10:54) NWC – Konner McQuillan 53-yard pass from Jalyn Gramstad, Eli Stader kick (Drive: 7 plays, 86 yards, 2:30; Keiser 24–14)
- (7:17) NWC – Konner McQuillan 2-yard run, Eli Stader kick (Drive: 7 plays, 52 yards, 3:37; Keiser 24–21)
- (7:06) UK – Louis Lubin III 77-yard kickoff return, Nico Cavanillas kick (Keiser 31–21)

=== Statistics ===
Statistics	KU	NWC
First downs	23	21
Total yards	490	338
Rushes–yards	45–373	30–51
Passing yards	117	287
Passing: Comp–Att–Int	10–15–2	15–34–1
Time of possession	28:58	31:02

Team	Category	Player	Statistics
Keiser	Passing	Justin Wake	10/15, 117 yards, 1 TD, 2 INT
Keiser	Rushing	Jaden Meizinger	22 carries, 261 yards, 1 TD
Keiser	Receiving	Maurico Porcha	2 receptions, 45 yards, 1 TD
Northwestern (IA)	Passing	Jalyn Gramstad	15/34, 287 yards, 2 TD, 1 INT
Northwestern (IA)	Rushing	Jalyn Gramstad	18 carries, 47 yards
Northwestern (IA)	Receiving	Michael Storey	6 receptions, 121 yards

== Postseason playoffs ==
A total of twenty teams were selected to participate in the single-elimination tournament from across the country, with invitations that were revealed on Sunday, November 12, 2023. The field included thirteen conference champions who received automatic bids. The field was then filled with at-large selections that were awarded to the highest ranked teams that were not conference champions. First-round seedings were based on the final regular-season edition of the 2023 NAIA Coaches' Poll, with certain minor modifications given based on travel and geographic considerations. Each subsequent round also saw minor modifications based on travel and the geography of the remaining teams.

Second round pairings were announced by the NAIA on November 18, after the first round results were known.

Quarterfinal pairings were announced by the NAIA on November 25, after the second round results were known.

Semifinal pairings were announced by the NAIA on December 2, soon after completion of the day's quarterfinal games.

First Round; November 18; Campus Sites
Dordt	35
Ottawa	7
Baker	55
Louisiana Christian	28
Montana Tech	28
Dickinson State	35
St. Thomas (FL)	55
Reinhardt	7

Second Round; November 25; Campus Sites
5	Marian (IN)	21
12	Saint Xavier	31
1	Northwestern (IA)	7
16	Dordt	0
6	Indiana Wesleyan	24
10	Morningside	21
4	Georgetown (KY)	42
15	Baker	21
8	Montana Western	42
11	College of Idaho	49
2	Grand View	28
14	Dickinson State	3
7	Bethel (TN)	40
9	Evangel	13
3	Keiser	45
13	St. Thomas (FL)	21

Quarterfinals; December 2nd Campus Sites
12	Saint Xavier	17
1	Northwestern (IA)	34
6	Indiana Wesleyan	21
4	Georgetown (KY)	31
11	College of Idaho	31
2	Grand View	17
7	Bethel (TN)	14
3	Keiser	56

Semifinals; December 9 Campus Sites
1	Northwestern (IA)	35
4	Georgetown (KY)	10
11	College of Idaho	21
3	Keiser	28

Championship; December 18; Durham, North Carolina
1	Northwestern (IA)	21
3	Keiser	31
