= Drew Maddox =

American football coach (born c. 1987)

Current position
- Title: Head coach
- Team: Arizona Christian
- Conference: Frontier
- Record: 0–10

Biographical details
- Born: c. 1987 (age 38–39)
- Education: Louisiana College (2015)

Playing career
- 2012-2014: Louisiana College

Coaching career (HC unless noted)
- 2015–2016: Louisiana College (ST/OL/DL)
- 2017–2018: Louisiana College (DC)
- 2019–2020: Glenbrook HS (LA)
- 2020–2023 (Note: Maddox joined Louisiana College in January 2021 and coached the 2020–21 team that played in the spring due to COVID-19.): Louisiana College / Louisiana Christian
- 2024: Southeast Missouri State (DL)
- 2025: John Melvin (FL)
- 2026–present: Arizona Christian

Head coaching record
- Overall: 22–26 (college); 11–9 (high school)
- Tournaments: 0–1 (NAIA playoffs)

Accomplishments and honors

Championships
- 1 SAC (2023)

Records
- 2× SAC Coach of the Year (2022–2023)

Drew Maddox (born c. 1987) is an American college football coach. He is the head football coach for Arizona Christian University, a position he has held since 2026. He was the head football coach for Glenbrook High School from 2019 to 2020 and Louisiana Christian University from 2020 to 2023. He also coached for Southeast Missouri State. He played college football for Louisiana College.

From 2006 to 2012, Maddox served in the United States Army, where he served in the Second Squadron, 108th Cavalry Regiment, Louisiana Army National Guard and became a sergeant.

== Head coaching record ==
=== College ===
Year	Team	Overall	Conference	Standing	Bowl/playoffs	Coaches^{#}
Louisiana College Wildcats (American Southwest Conference) (2020)
2020–21	Louisiana College	2–3	2–2	T–2nd		
Louisiana Christian Wildcats (Sooner Athletic Conference) (2021–2023)
2021	Louisiana Christian	4–7	4–5	6th		
2022	Louisiana Christian	7–4	6–3	T–4th		
2023	Louisiana Christian	9–2	7–1	T–1st	L NAIA First Round	21
Louisiana College / Louisiana Christian:		22–16	19–11			
John Melvin Mohawks (Independent) (2025)
2025	John Melvin	0–0	0–0			
John Melvin:		0–0	0–0			
Arizona Christian Firestorm (Frontier Conference) (2026–present)
2026	Arizona Christian	0–10	0–6	7th (West)		
Arizona Christian:		0–10	0–6			
Total:		22–26				
National championship Conference title Conference division title or championship game berth

=== High school ===
Year	Team	Overall	Conference	Standing	Bowl/playoffs
Glenbrook Apaches () (2019–2020)
2019	Glenbrook	6–4	1–1	2nd	
2020	Glenbrook	5–5	1–2	3rd	
Glenbrook:		11–9	2–3		
Total:		11–9			
