= Dave Taynor =

American football coach

Current position
- Title: Associate head coach & offensive coordinator
- Team: Defiance
- Conference: MSFA

Biographical details
- Education: Urbana

Coaching career (HC unless noted)
- 1998: Urbana (SA/OL)
- 1999–2000: Louisville (GA)
- 2001–2003: Culver–Stockton (OC/OL/TE)
- 2004–2005: Wisconsin–Stevens Point (DC/OL)
- 2006–2007: Tiffin (OC/OL)
- 2008–2014: Urbana
- 2015–2019: Lock Haven
- 2020: Graham HS (OH) (assistant)
- 2021–2022: Graham HS (OH)
- 2023–2024: Sidney HS (OH)
- 2025–present: Defiance (AHC/OC)

Head coaching record
- Overall: 50–82 (college); 22–22 (high school)

Accomplishments and honors

Championships
- 2 GLFC (2010–2011)

Dave Taynor is an American college football coach. He is the associate head football coach and offensive coordinator for Defiance College, positions he has held since 2025. Before that, he was the head football coach at Sidney High School in Sidney, Ohio, a position he has held since the 2023 season. Taynor served as the head football coach at his alma mater, Urbana University in Urbana, Ohio from 2008 to 2014 and Lock Haven University of Pennsylvania in Lock Haven, Pennsylvania from 2015 to 2019.

== Head coaching record ==
=== College ===
Year	Team	Overall	Conference	Standing	Bowl/playoffs
Urbana Blue Knights (NAIA independent) (2008–2009)
2008	Urbana	1–10			
2009	Urbana	6–5			
Urbana Blue Knights (Great Lakes Football Conference) (2010–2011)
2010	Urbana	5–6	2–1	T–1st	
2011	Urbana	8–3	3–0	1st	
Urbana Blue Knights (Great Lakes Valley Conference) (2012)
2012	Urbana	8–3	6–2	T–3rd	
Urbana Blue Knights (Mountain East Conference) (2013–2014)
2013	Urbana	7–4	7–2	T–2nd	
2014	Urbana	3–8	2–8	T–9th	
Urbana:		38–39	20–13		
Lock Haven Bald Eagles (Pennsylvania State Athletic Conference) (2015–present)
2015	Lock Haven	2–9	2–5	6th (East)	
2016	Lock Haven	4–7	4–3	T–3rd (East)	
2017	Lock Haven	2–9	2–5	T–6th (East)	
2018	Lock Haven	2–9	1–5	6th (East)	
2019	Lock Haven	2–9	0–7	8th (East)	
Lock Haven:		12–43	9–25		
Total:		50–82			

=== High school ===
Year	Team	Overall	Conference	Standing	Bowl/playoffs
Graham Falcons () (2021–2022)
2021	Graham	7–4	3–2	3rd	
2022	Graham	5–6	3–2	4th	
Graham:		12–10	6–4		
Sidney Yellow Jackets () (2023–2024)
2023	Sidney	5–6	5–4	4th	
2024	Sidney	5–6	5–4	5th	
Sidney:		10–12	10–8		
Total:		22–22			
