= Arizona Christian Firestorm football =

Intercollegiate American football team

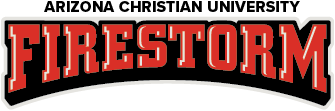
- First season: 2014; 12 years ago
- Athletic director: Peter Dryer
- Head coach: Drew Maddox; 1st season, 0–0 (–)
- Location: Glendale, Arizona
- Conference: Frontier Conference
- Colors: Red and yellow
- All-time record: 63–28 (.692)

Conference championships
- 4
- Website: acufirestorm.com/football

The Arizona Christian Firestorm football team is the intercollegiate football team of Arizona Christian University (ACU). The Firestorm are part of the National Association of Intercollegiate Athletics (NAIA). The Firestorm won the CSFL Championship in their first two seasons competing in the conference. The Firestorm won another two championships in the Sooner Athletic Conference in 2020/21 (split season because of COVID-19) and 2022. The team's motto is "Roll Storm."

== History ==
=== Inaugural season (2014) ===
On September 14, 2013, Arizona Christian president Len Munsil announced that the team would begin play in the NAIA the following season. A national search was started for the team's first head coach, and received over 100 applicants. On December 19, 2013, the university announced that Donnie Yantis would be ACU's first head football coach. The team played a non-conference schedule during the season and ended up going 2–7 on the season.

=== CSFL champion (2015) ===
After starting 0–3 in non-conference play, the Firestorm won their next six games and captured the Central States Football League (CSFL) championship. The team surprised many, especially after starting so slow in non-conference play. The team finished the season ranked No. 22 in the nation, just missing out on the playoffs.

=== The Jeff Bowen era (2016–2025) ===
After the 2015 season, Yantis took a job with Arizona State. Assistant head coach Jeff Bowen was promoted to head coach of the program. The 2016 season showed similar results to the 2015 campaign, with the team finishing undefeated in conference play and 7–3 overall and winning their second consecutive CSFL championship. The team again finished the season ranked No. 22 in the nation. Punter Derek Brush became the first NAIA All-American in the program's history. In November 2016, the CSFL coaches named Gerrit Groenewold Offensive Player of Year, Johnathon Parks as Newcomer of the Year, Brush as Special Teams Player of the Year, and Bowen as Head Coach of the Year.

Arizona Christian was one of the few schools to play a double season in the 2020–21 academic year, playing a non-conference schedule in Fall 2020 and a conference schedule in Spring 2021, after its conference postponed their season to spring due to the COVID-19 Pandemic.

Kicker Manny Higuera would earn national attention for his kicking work with the Firestorm and would later go professional as a member of the Washington Wolfpack of Arena Football One.

=== Drew Maddox (2026–present) ===
Following Coach Bowen stepping down from the head coaching position, Drew Maddox was named the third head coach in ACU history on Jan. 5, 2026.

== Head coaching history ==
The Arizona Christian has had three head coaches.

Coach	Years	Record
Donnie Yantis	2014–2015	8–10 (.444)
Jeff Bowen	2016–2025	52–20 (.722)
Drew Maddox	2026-present	0-5 (.000)

== Seasons ==
Year	Head coach	Overall record	Conference record	Conference standing
NAIA independent (2014)
2014	Donnie Yantis	2–7	0–0	
Central States Football League (2015–2017)
2015	Donnie Yantis	6–3	6–0	1st
2016	Jeff Bowen	7–3	6–0	1st
2017	Jeff Bowen	7–3	5–3	4th
Sooner Athletic Conference (2018–2022)
2018	Jeff Bowen	8–3	6–3	T–3rd
2019	Jeff Bowen	6–4	6–2	T–3rd
2020	Jeff Bowen	8–1	5–0	1st
2021	Jeff Bowen	8–2	7–2	T–2nd
2022	Jeff Bowen	8–3	7–2	T–1st
Frontier Conference (2023–present)
2023	Jeff Bowen	2-8	1-7	8th
2024	Jeff Bowen	2-8	1-7	7th
2025	Jeff Bowen	2-8	1-5	6th (West)
2026	Drew Maddox	0-5	0-2	
Totals	13 Years; 3 Coaches	–	–	3 Conferences
