= Alex Kretzschmar =

American football coach (born c. 1989)

Current position
- Title: Head coach
- Team: Dakota Wesleyan
- Conference: GPAC
- Record: 12–18

Biographical details
- Born: April 3, 1989 (age 37); Hartland, Wisconsin, U.S.
- Education: St. Norbert College (2011); St. Ambrose University (2015)

Playing career
- 2007–2010: St. Norbert
- Position: Wide receiver

Coaching career (HC unless noted)
- 2011: St. Norbert (SA)
- 2012: North Park (WR)
- 2013–2014: St. Ambrose (WR)
- 2015 (spring): St. Ambrose (RB)
- 2015–2017: Colby (QB/WR)
- 2018–2020: Dakota State (OC/WR)
- 2021: Valley City State (QB/WR)
- 2022: Dakota Wesleyan (ST/DB)
- 2023: Dakota Wesleyan (OC/WR)
- 2024–present: Dakota Wesleyan

Head coaching record
- Overall: 12–18

Alex Kretzschmar is an American college football coach. He is the head football coach for Dakota Wesleyan University, a position he has held since 2024. He also coached for St. Norbert, North Park, St. Ambrose, Colby, Dakota State, and Valley City State. He played college football for St. Norbert as a wide receiver.

== Head coaching record ==
Year	Team	Overall	Conference	Standing	Bowl/playoffs
Dakota Wesleyan Tigers (Great Plains Athletic Conference) (2024–present)
2024	Dakota Wesleyan	4–7	4–6	7th	
2025	Dakota Wesleyan	4–7	3–7	T–8th	
2026	Dakota Wesleyan	4–4	4–3		
Dakota Wesleyan:		12–18	11–16		
Total:		12–18			
