= St. Thomas Bobcats football =

College football team

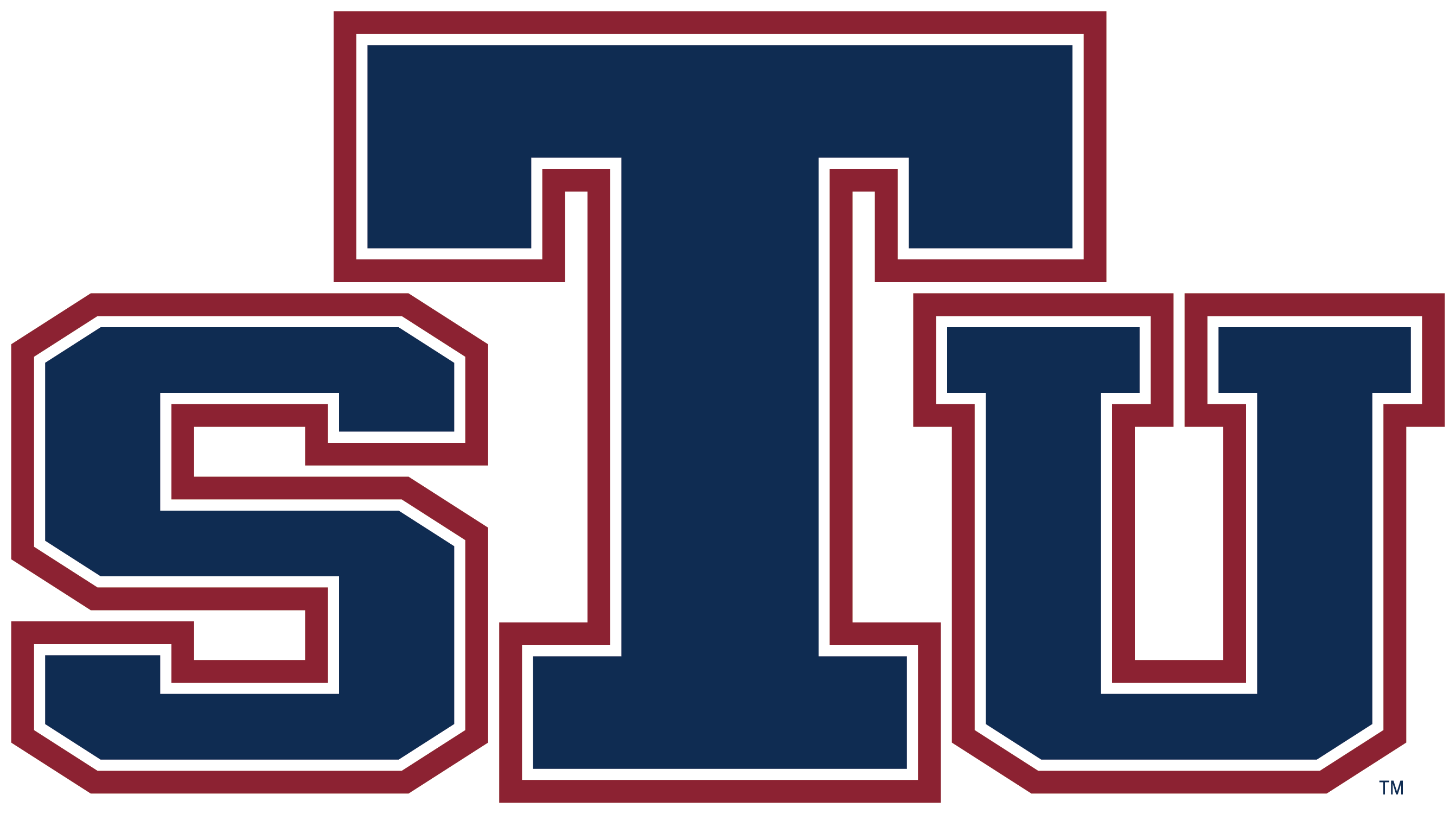
- First season: 2019; 7 years ago
- Athletic director: Bill Rychel
- Head coach: Drew Davis; 1st season, 0–0 (–)
- Location: Miami Gardens, Florida
- Stadium: AutoNation Field (capacity: 1,600)
- Conference: Sun Conference
- Colors: Blue and burgundy
- All-time record: 51–23 (.689)
- Mascot: Bobcat
- Website: stubobcats.com/football

The St. Thomas Bobcats football team represents St. Thomas University in college football in the National Association of Intercollegiate Athletics (NAIA). The Bobcats are members of the Sun Conference (TSC), fielding its team in the TSC since 2022. The Bobcats play their home games at AutoNation Field in Miami Gardens, Florida.

Their head coach is Drew Davis, who is the son of former coach Butch Davis

== Conference affiliations ==
- Mid-South Conference (2019–2021)
- Sun Conference (2022–present)

== List of head coaches ==
=== Key ===
Key to symbols in coaches list
General		Overall		Conference		Postseason (Note: Although the first Rose Bowl Game was played in 1902, it has been continuously played since the 1916 game, and is recognized as the oldest bowl game by the NCAA. "—" indicates any season prior to 1916 when postseason games were not played.)	
No.	Order of coaches (Note: A running total of the number of head coaches, with coaches who served separate tenures being counted only once. Interim head coaches are represented with "Int" and are not counted in the running total. "—" indicates the team played but either without a coach or no coach is on record. "X" indicates an interim year without play.)	GC	Games coached	CW	Conference wins	PW	Postseason wins
DC	Division championships	OW	Overall wins	CL	Conference losses	PL	Postseason losses
CC	Conference championships	OL	Overall losses	CT	Conference ties	PT	Postseason ties
NC	National championships	OT	Overall ties (Note: Overtime rules in college football were introduced in 1996, making ties impossible in the period since.)	C%	Conference winning percentage		
†	Elected to the College Football Hall of Fame	O%	Overall winning percentage (Note: When computing the win–loss percentage, a tie counts as half a win and half a loss.)				

=== Coaches ===
List of head football coaches showing season(s) coached, overall records, conference records, postseason records, championships and selected awards
No.	Name	Season(s)	GC	OW	OL	O%	CW	CL	C%	PW	PL	DC	CC	NC	Awards
1	Bill Rychel	2019–2025	74	51	23	0.689	31	13	0.705	1	3	0.250	—	—	—

== Year-by-year results ==
National champions	Conference champions	Bowl game berth	Playoff berth

Season	Year	Head coach	Assoc.	Division	Conference	Record					Postseason	Final ranking
Season	Year	Head coach	Assoc.	Division	Conference	Overall		Conference			Postseason	Final ranking
Season	Year	Head coach	Assoc.	Division	Conference	Win	Loss	Finish	Win	Loss	Postseason	Final ranking
2019	2019	Bill Rychel	NAIA	—	MSC	4	6	T–4th (Sun)	2	4	—	—
2020–21	2020	Bill Rychel	NAIA	—	MSC	4	3	3rd (Sun)	3	2	—	—
2021	2021	Bill Rychel	NAIA	—	MSC	9	2	T–3rd (Sun)	4	2	—	—
2022	2022	Bill Rychel	NAIA	—	TSC	9	2	2nd	5	1	—	15
2023	2023	Bill Rychel	NAIA	—	TSC	9	4	2nd	6	1	L NAIA Second Round	15
2024	2024	Bill Rychel	NAIA	—	TSC	9	2	2nd	6	1	L NAIA Second Round	5
2025	2025	Bill Rychel	NAIA	—	TSC	7	4	T–2nd	5	2	L NAIA First Round	17
