= 2023 NAIA football season =

American college football season

- Total No. of teams: 95
- Regular season: August 19 – November 11, 2023
- Postseason: November 18 – December 18, 2023
- National Championship: Durham County Memorial Stadium; Durham, NC; December 18, 2023
- Champion: Keiser
- Player of the Year: Jalyn Gramstad, QB, Northwestern (IA)

The 2023 NAIA football season was the component of the 2023 college football season organized by the National Association of Intercollegiate Athletics (NAIA) in the United States.

The regular season began on August 19 and culminated on November 11.

The playoffs, known as the NAIA Football National Championship, began on November 18 and culminated with the championship game on December 18 at Durham County Memorial Stadium in Durham, North Carolina.

== Membership changes ==
School	Former conference	New conference
Arizona Christian Firestorm	Sooner	Frontier
Arkansas Baptist Buffaloes	Independent	Sooner
Evangel Valor	Heart of America	Kansas
Iowa Wesleyan Tigers	North Star	School closed
Lyon Scots	Sooner	NCAA Division III independent
Missouri Baptist Spartans	Mid-States	Heart of America
North American Stallions	Independent	Sooner
Pikeville Bears	Mid-South	Appalachian
Presentation Saints	North Star	School closed
Thomas Night Hawks	New program	Sun
Thomas More Saints	Mid-South	Great Midwest (NCAA D-II)
Trinity International Trojans	Mid-States	Dropped athletics

== Headlines ==
- The NAIA Council of Presidents voted on and approved expanding the NAIA football playoffs from 16 to 20 teams effective for this season. Under the new format, there will be 13 automatic qualifiers, with 7 more at-large teams picked from the Top 25 teams in the final NAIA Coaches Poll, and the top 12 seeds will receive a bye in the first round.

== Conference standings ==
2023 Appalachian Athletic Conference football standings
	Conf.			Overall
Team	W		L	W		L
No. 18 Reinhardt $^	6	–	0	8	–	3
Pikeville	5	–	1	7	–	3
Bluefield	3	–	3	5	–	5
Union (KY)	3	–	3	4	–	6
Point	3	–	3	4	–	7
Kentucky Christian	1	–	5	1	–	10
St. Andrews	0	–	6	0	–	10
$ – Conference champion; ^ – NAIA playoff participant; Rankings from NAIA Coaches' Poll

2023 Frontier Conference football standings
	Conf.			Overall
Team	W		L	W		L
No. 8 Montana Western $^	7	–	1	9	–	2
No. 10т College of Idaho ^	6	–	2	10	–	3
No. 17 Montana Tech ^	6	–	2	7	–	4
No. 24 Carroll (MT)	5	–	3	7	–	3
Southern Oregon	5	–	3	6	–	4
Rocky Mountain	4	–	4	6	–	4
Eastern Oregon	2	–	6	2	–	8
Arizona Christian	1	–	7	2	–	8
Montana State–Northern	0	–	8	1	–	9
$ – Conference champion; ^ – NAIA playoff participant; Rankings from NAIA Coaches' Poll

2023 Great Plains Athletic Conference football standings
	Conf.			Overall
Team	W		L	W		L
No. 1 Northwestern (IA) $^	10	–	0	14	–	1
No. 14 Dordt ^	8	–	2	9	–	3
No. 10т Morningside ^	8	–	2	9	–	3
Dakota Wesleyan	5	–	5	6	–	5
Midland	5	–	5	6	–	5
Concordia (NE)	5	–	5	5	–	5
Hastings	4	–	6	5	–	6
Briar Cliff	4	–	6	4	–	7
Mount Marty	2	–	8	3	–	8
Doane	2	–	8	2	–	9
Jamestown	2	–	8	2	–	9
$ – Conference champion; ^ – NAIA playoff participant; Rankings from NAIA Coaches' Poll

2023 Heart of America Athletic Conference football standings
	Conf.			Overall
Team	W		L	W		L
North
No. 2 Grand View x^	5	–	0	11	–	1
Graceland	3	–	2	6	–	5
Peru State	3	–	2	5	–	6
William Penn	2	–	3	4	–	6
Clarke	2	–	3	3	–	8
Culver–Stockton	0	–	5	1	–	10
South
No. 22 MidAmerica Nazarene x	4	–	1	9	–	2
No. 20 Baker x^	4	–	1	9	–	3
No. 25 Benedictine (KS) x	4	–	1	8	–	3
Missouri Valley	2	–	3	5	–	5
Missouri Baptist	1	–	4	2	–	8
Central Methodist	0	–	5	1	–	10
x – Division champion/co-champions; ^ – NAIA playoff participant; Rankings from NAIA Coaches' Poll

2023 Kansas Collegiate Athletic Conference football standings
	Conf.			Overall
Team	W		L	W		L
Bissell Division
Kansas Wesleyan x	5	–	1	8	–	3
Ottawa x^	5	–	1	6	–	6
Avila	4	–	2	4	–	7
Saint Mary (KS)	2	–	4	3	–	8
Tabor	2	–	4	3	–	8
Sterling	2	–	4	2	–	9
Kessinger Division
No. 9 Evangel x^	5	–	0	11	–	1
No. 23 Friends	4	–	1	9	–	2
Bethel (KS)	3	–	2	6	–	5
Southwestern (KS)	2	–	3	8	–	3
McPherson	1	–	4	5	–	6
Bethany (KS)	0	–	5	1	–	10
x – Division champion/co-champions; ^ – NAIA playoff participant; Rankings from NAIA Coaches' Poll

2023 Mid-South Conference football standings
	Conf.			Overall
Team	W		L	W		L
No. 4 Georgetown (KY) $^	6	–	0	10	–	2
No. 7 Bethel (TN) ^	5	–	1	11	–	2
No. 19 Lindsey Wilson	4	–	2	7	–	3
Cumberlands (KY)	2	–	4	6	–	4
Cumberland (TN)	2	–	4	5	–	5
Campbellsville	2	–	4	4	–	6
Faulkner	0	–	6	2	–	8
$ – Conference champion; ^ – NAIA playoff participant; Rankings from NAIA Coaches' Poll

2023 Mid-States Football Association standings
	Conf.			Overall
Team	W		L	W		L
Mideast League
No. 6 Indiana Wesleyan ^	6	–	1	10	–	2
No. 5 Marian (IN) x^	6	–	1	9	–	2
Saint Francis (IN)	5	–	2	6	–	4
Concordia (MI)	4	–	3	7	–	3
Siena Heights	4	–	3	6	–	4
Lawrence Tech	2	–	5	3	–	7
Taylor	1	–	6	2	–	9
Madonna	0	–	7	0	–	11
Midwest League
No. 10т Saint Xavier x^	5	–	0	8	–	4
Roosevelt	4	–	1	6	–	4
Olivet Nazarene	3	–	2	6	–	4
St. Francis (IL)	3	–	3	7	–	3
St. Ambrose	1	–	4	1	–	9
Judson	0	–	6	0	–	9
x – League champion ^ – NAIA playoff participant; Rankings from NAIA Coaches' Poll

2023 North Star Athletic Association football standings
	Conf.			Overall
Team	W		L	W		L
No. 16 Dickinson State $^	8	–	0	10	–	2
Valley City State	6	–	2	7	–	3
Waldorf	3	–	5	4	–	6
Mayville State	2	–	6	2	–	9
Dakota State	1	–	7	1	–	9
$ – Conference champion; ^ – NAIA playoff participant; Rankings from NAIA Coaches' Poll

2023 Sooner Athletic Conference football standings
	Conf.			Overall
Team	W		L	W		L
No. 13 OUAZ +	7	–	1	8	–	1
No. 21 Louisiana Christian +^	7	–	1	9	–	2
Texas Wesleyan +	7	–	1	8	–	2
Langston	5	–	3	6	–	4
OK Panhandle State	4	–	4	5	–	5
SAGU	4	–	5	4	–	6
Arkansas Baptist	1	–	6	2	–	7
Wayland Baptist	1	–	7	2	–	8
Texas College	1	–	7	1	–	10
North American *	0	–	2	1	–	10
+ – Conference co-champions; ^ – NAIA playoff participant * – Accepted as SAC member but only games against SAGU and Arkansas Baptist counted as conference games.; Rankings from NAIA Coaches' Poll

2023 Sun Conference football standings
	Conf.			Overall
Team	W		L	W		L
No. 3 Keiser $^	7	–	0	12	–	2
No. 15 St. Thomas (FL) ^	6	–	1	9	–	4
Florida Memorial	5	–	2	6	–	4
Southeastern	4	–	3	5	–	5
Ave Maria	2	–	5	4	–	6
Webber International	2	–	5	3	–	7
Warner	1	–	6	4	–	6
Thomas	1	–	6	1	–	8
$ – Conference champion; ^ – NAIA playoff participant; Rankings from NAIA Coaches' Poll

== Postseason ==
=== Bracket ===
First Round; November 18; Campus Sites
Dordt	35
Ottawa	7
Baker	55
Louisiana Christian	28
Montana Tech	28
Dickinson State	35
St. Thomas (FL)	55
Reinhardt	7

Second Round; November 25; Campus Sites
5	Marian (IN)	21
12	Saint Xavier	31
1	Northwestern (IA)	7
16	Dordt	0
6	Indiana Wesleyan	24
10	Morningside	21
4	Georgetown (KY)	42
15	Baker	21
8	Montana Western	42
11	College of Idaho	49
2	Grand View	28
14	Dickinson State	3
7	Bethel (TN)	40
9	Evangel	13
3	Keiser	45
13	St. Thomas (FL)	21

Quarterfinals; December 2 Campus Sites
12	Saint Xavier	17
1	Northwestern (IA)	34
6	Indiana Wesleyan	21
4	Georgetown (KY)	31
11	College of Idaho	31
2	Grand View	17
7	Bethel (TN)	14
3	Keiser	56

Semifinals; December 9 Campus Sites
1	Northwestern (IA)	35
4	Georgetown (KY)	10
11	College of Idaho	21
3	Keiser	28

Championship; December 18; Durham, North Carolina
1	Northwestern (IA)	21
3	Keiser	31

== Coaching changes ==
=== Preseason and in-season ===
This is restricted to coaching changes that took place on or after May 1, 2023, and will include any changes announced after a team's last regularly scheduled games but before its playoff games.

School	Outgoing coach	Date	Reason	Replacement	Previous position
Waldorf	Chase Paramore	June 2023	Resigned	Tyler Chapa (named full time September 26)	Waldorf offensive coordinator (2022)
Olivet Nazarene	Eric Hehman	May 25, 2023	Resigned	Mike Conway	Taylor defensive coordinator (2019)

=== End of season ===
This list includes coaching changes announced during the season that did not take effect until the end of the season.

School	Outgoing coach	Date	Reason	Replacement	Previous position
Lawrence Tech	Avante Mitchell	November 14, 2023	Fired	Scott Merchant	Chippewa Valley HS (MI) head coach (2009–2023)
Missouri Valley	Paul Troth	November 15, 2023	Resigned	Casey Creehan	Concord defensive coordinator (2023)
SAGU	Greg Ellis	November 27, 2023	Resigned	Jared Hudgins	SAGU defensive coordinator (2021–2023)
Madonna	Herb Haygood	December 1, 2023	Accepted administration position	Brett Guminsky	Pikeville co-offensive coordinator and wide receivers coach (2023)
Doane	Chris Bessler	December 6, 2023	Resigned	Jonathan Johnson	Hilbert assistant head coach and defensive coordinator (2023)
Olivet Nazarene	Mike Conway (interim)	January 18, 2024	Permanent replacement	Avante Mitchell	Lawrence Tech head coach (2020–2023)
Keiser	Doug Socha	January 29, 2024	Hired by Lenoir–Rhyne	Myles Russ	Keiser associate head coach and running backs coach (2019–2023)
Dakota Wesleyan	Ross Cimpl	February 13, 2024	Named school's athletic director	Alex Kretzschmar	Dakota Wesleyan offensive coordinator and wide receivers coach (2023)
Louisiana Christian	Drew Maddox	February 20, 2024	Hired as defensive line coach by Southeast Missouri State	Ben McLaughlin	Buckeye HS (LA) head coach (2022–2023)
Texas Wesleyan	Joe Prud'homme	March 18, 2024	Resigned	Brad Sherrod	UTSA linebackers coach (2021–2023)

== See also ==
- 2023 NCAA Division I FBS football season
- 2023 NCAA Division I FCS football season
- 2023 NCAA Division II football season
- 2023 NCAA Division III football season
- 2023 U Sports football season
- 2023 junior college football season
