= University of St. Francis (Joliet) =

Private university in Joliet, Illinois, US

Coordinates: 41.5330°N 88.0955°W

- Former names: The Sisters' Normal Institute of Higher Learning (1920–1925); Assisi Junior College (1925–1930); College of St. Francis (1930–1998)
- Motto: Primo Unctio et Postea Speculatio
- Motto in English: Holiness First and Then Learning
- Type: Private university
- Established: 1920; 106 years ago
- Founder: Sisters of St. Francis of Mary Immaculate
- Affiliations: ACCU; AFCU; CIC
- Religious affiliation: Roman Catholic Church (Congregation of the Third Order of St. Francis of Mary Immaculate)
- Endowment: $26.6 million (2022)
- President: Ryan C. Hendrickson
- Provost: Beth Roth
- Faculty: 80 full-time, 199 part-time
- Students: 2,912 (fall 2025)
- Undergraduates: 1,226 (fall 2025)
- Postgraduates: 1,686 (fall 2025)
- Location: Joliet, Illinois, United States
- Campus: Main Campus: Suburban, 22 acres (8.9 ha)
- Colors: Brown and gold
- Nickname: Fighting Saints
- Sporting affiliations: NAIA – CCAC and MSFA
- Mascot: Bernie the St. Bernard
- Website: stfrancis.edu
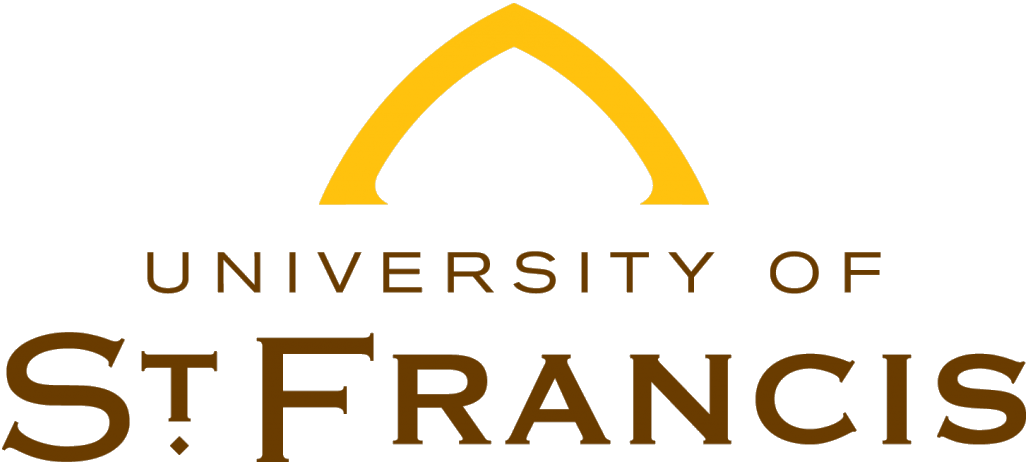

The University of St. Francis (USF) is a private Franciscan university with its main campus in Joliet, Illinois. It enrolls nearly 3,200 students at locations throughout the country with about 1,300 students at its main campus.

== History ==
=== Early history (1865–1929) ===
The University of St. Francis grew out of an earlier high school and Sisters’ Normal Institute (an institution created to train high school graduates to be teachers) by the Congregation of the Sisters of St. Francis of Mary Immaculate in Joliet established on August 2, 1865, by Mother Alfred Moes. By 1869, a boarding school for high school girls opened in Joliet called the St. Francis Academy. The Institute became a college: "The Sisters’ Normal Institute of Higher Learning", in 1920.

In 1912–1913, a new academic wing was added to the Motherhouse to accommodate the growing educational programs. In 1915, the curriculum at SFA expanded, and the academy reopened in a new space. In 1920, the Congregation amended its original charter to include the formation of a college department and a nurses' training school, Saint Joseph School of Nursing, which opened to the laity that same year. Tower Hall was built in 1922 to provide additional space for the academy and the college.

The institute became "Assisi Junior College", a two-year junior college, in 1925. Mother M. Thomasine Frye, OSF served as first president with an enrollment of 12 students and 8 teachers.

=== College of St. Francis (1930–1997) ===
In 1930, the school was reorganized with a full college curriculum as the "College of St. Francis" with bachelor's degree granting authority. In 1935, the all-female college began an affiliation with the St. Joseph Hospital School of Nursing – to create the St. Francis College of Nursing. By 1938, CSF had earned accreditation from the North Central Association of Colleges and Universities.

Throughout the 1940s, new academic programs, including Spanish and Science majors, were introduced. A Cadet Nurse Training program was also launched during World War II. In 1945, a student-run radio station, WCSF, began broadcasting ― WCSF would evolve to be sanctioned by the university in 1976, and into an FCC licensed FM station by 1988.

The 1950s and 1960s saw significant growth. Sr. M. Elvira Bredel was named the third president of CSF in 1953, and the Seraphic Institute of Theology was inaugurated. St. Francis Academy ceased operation in Tower Hall in 1956, and in 1957 the Caritas fundraiser gala began raising money for student scholarships.

In 1962, Anita Marie Jochem was named the college's fourth president and the last congregational sister president. The college officially incorporated as its own institution, separate from the congregation, with its own charter and by-laws. By the mid-1960's, the first stand alone residence hall was built.

In 1969, Francis Kerins was appointed as the college's fifth president. During the late 60's and early 70's, there were potential merger talks with Lewis University in nearby Romeoville to form "Lewis-St. Francis of Illinois", a name that was used by Lewis during the 1970–71 academic year, but the merger talks were ended in 1972.

The college became coeducational in 1971. In 1974, John C. Orr was named the college's sixth president. Athletic programs expanded in the early 1970s, and the college became known as "The Fighting Saints" in 1975.

By 1980, CSF was granted graduate degree-granting authority and introduced a master's program in health services administration. In 1986, a recreation center was built on campus. The 1990s brought further development, including the Moser Performing Arts Center being added on to Tower Hall. In 1995, James Doppke was named the college's seventh president.

=== University of St. Francis (1998–present) ===
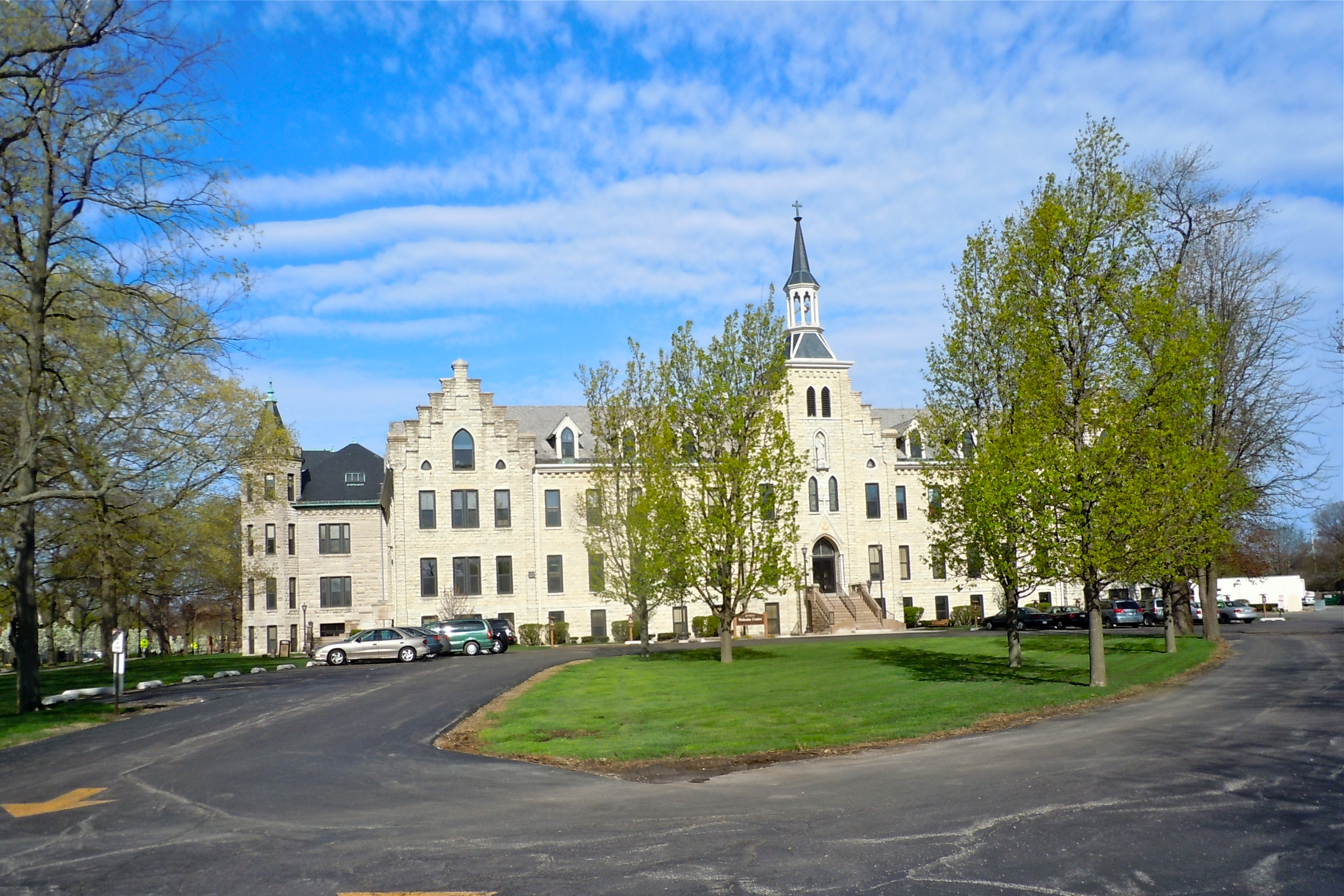
The university in 2011

The school became the University of St. Francis in 1998, the same year the school began offering online courses and degree programs. In 2002, Michael J. Vinciguerra was named the university's eighth president, and by 2004 was organized in five colleges: College of Arts & Sciences, College of Business & Health Administration, College of Education, College of Nursing and Health Professions, and College of Professional Studies.

In 2009, the university received doctoral degree granting authority and the Art & Design Department opened the Center for Art & Design in a renovated space in the Rialto Square Theatre in downtown Joliet. USF's new alma mater, Our St. Francis, was composed and first performed by Robert Kase.

In 2013, Arvid Johnson became the university's ninth president and the university's first overseas graduate program was established with Brno University of Technology in the Czech Republic. The university's St. Bonaventure Campus opened in downtown Joliet with additional classrooms, offices, and a business incubator. In 2016, Guardian Angel Hall opened to students at St. Clare Campus, located at 1550 Plainfield Road (about one mile from the main campus) as the home to the USF Leach College of Nursing.

In 2018, new construction was completed on the LaVerne & Dorothy Brown Science Hall on the main campus. The university celebrated its centennial anniversary in 2020.

Dr. Ryan Hendrickson was announced as the incoming president of the university in February, 2025. His tenure as the 10th president of St. Francis began on June 1, 2025.

In October 2026, the university opened the Student Success Center and the Dorothy A. Ritter Ph.D., M.D. Center for Learning and Achievement on campus, which includes a new cafeteria, a large gathering space, and a new suite of offices for student learning and support.

== Colleges and schools ==
- College of Arts & Sciences
- College of Business & Health Administration
- College of Education
- Leach College of Nursing

The university also offers a Physician Assistant program at a campus site in Albuquerque, New Mexico.

== Athletics ==
The St. Francis (USF) athletic teams are called the Fighting Saints. The university is a member of the National Association of Intercollegiate Athletics (NAIA) and is part of the Chicagoland Collegiate Athletic Conference (CCAC) for most of its sports since the 1973–74 academic year; while its football team competes in the Midwest League of the Mid-States Football Association (MSFA).

USF competes in 20 intercollegiate varsity sports: Men's sports include baseball, basketball, bowling, cross country, football, golf, soccer, tennis and track & field; while women's sports include basketball, bowling, cross country, dance, golf, soccer, softball, tennis, track & field and volleyball; and co-ed sports include cheerleading.

=== History ===
The University of St. Francis (USF), originally known as the College of St. Francis (CSF), initiated its men's intercollegiate athletics program in 1972. Under the leadership of Elmer Bell, the institution's first full-time athletic director, CSF launched its inaugural athletic programs, including baseball and men's basketball, both of which adopted the nickname "Falcons." Later during the same year, the men's marathon running team gained national recognition. In 1973, men's cross country became CSF's third athletic program.

In 1975, the institution rebranded its athletic teams as the "Fighting Saints." The following year, intercollegiate programs for women's basketball, men's tennis, women's tennis, and women's volleyball were introduced. By 1979, CSF expanded further, adding men's golf and softball to its roster of sports. In 1982, the men's soccer and women's cross country teams began competing. Four years later, in 1986, a recreation center was built for the athletic department, and a men's football program was introduced. Tower Hall was also deeded to the college that year. In 1987, cheerleading was added to CSF's athletics offerings.

A major milestone occurred in 1993 when the CSF baseball team won the school's first-ever NAIA World Series national championship under head coach Gordie Gillespie, who became college baseball's all-time winningest coach. In 1995, the university expanded its athletic department with the addition of women's soccer. The year 2000 saw the start of women's golf and women's track & field programs, and in 2007, men's track & field was also introduced.

USF's men's cross country team won the NAIA National Championship in 2012, a year which also marked the renaming of the recreation center to the "Pat Sullivan Center" in honor of long-time basketball coach and athletic director Pat Sullivan. In 2013, USF began competing in men's and women's bowling. By 2016, the university introduced competitive dance as its 22nd sport. The women's bowling team secured the NAIA Invitational Championship in 2017, followed by the women's cross country team claiming the NAIA National Championship in 2020. In 2021, the men's bowling team added to the university's accomplishments by winning the NAIA Championship.

== Notable alumni ==
- Jon Debus, professional baseball player and coach
- James Acho, American sports attorney
- Mike Feminis, college football coach
- Natalie Manley, member of Illinois House of Representatives
- Jennifer Bertino-Tarrant, Will County Executive and former State Senator
- Pat McGuire, former Illinois State Senator
- Steve Parris, professional baseball player
- Mike Wessel, former football player, current Mixed Martial Artist for Bellator fighting championships
- Nikki Woods, radio producer, Tom Joyner Morning Show
- Mohammed Rashid, professional soccer player
- Joe Curry (American football), college football coach
