= Taylor Trojans =

Sports teams at Taylor University

- University: Taylor University
- Nickname: Trojans
- Association: NAIA
- Conference: Crossroads League
- Athletic director: Kyle Gould
- Location: Upland, Indiana
- Varsity teams: 16
- Football stadium: Turner Stadium
- Basketball arena: Odle Arena
- Colors: Purple and sharpening iron
- Website: taylortrojans.com
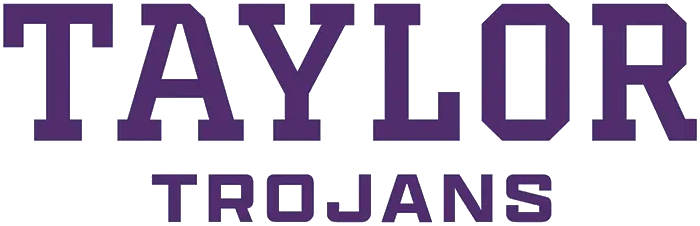

The Taylor Trojans are the athletic program at Taylor University in Upland, Indiana. They compete in the Crossroads League of the National Association of Intercollegiate Athletics (NAIA).

== Varsity sports ==
Men's sports	Women's sports
Baseball	Basketball
Basketball	Cross country
Cross country	Golf
Football	Soccer
Golf	Softball
Lacrosse	Tennis
Soccer	Track and field
Tennis	Volleyball
Track and field	

=== Basketball ===
Taylor basketball's all-time leading scorer is Jason Hubbard, who graduated In 2023. They have never won a national championship. The head coach is Austin Peters who has coached the Trojans since 2024. DePaul coach Chris Holtmann played basketball for the Trojans. Akron coach John Groce also played for the Trojans. They play at Odle Arena

==== Silent Night ====
Every year, on the Friday before final exams, Taylor University holds the Silent Night Men's Basketball game. In it, students remain quiet until the tenth point is scored and then erupt in cheers. In the late moments of the game, "Silent Night" is sung. A former assistant coach came up with the idea in the late 1980s, and it was a packed event by the mid-to-late 1990s. Afterward, students can go to the president's campus-wide party involving live Christmas music, making and eating Christmas cookies, and making gingerbread houses. The 2010 game was more formally named the 27th Annual Ivanhoe Classic and resulted in a 112–67 win over Ohio State-Marion. This was the most scored by the Taylor men's basketball team since the 1993–94 squad scored 139 points in a victory over Robert Morris University (Illinois). This allowed Taylor students to quiet down and erupt in celebration again after the 100th point. Casey Coons scored the tenth point in the 2009 Silent Night, the 2010 Silent Night, and the 2011 Silent Night on free throws. Casey Coons received the NAIA Mid-Central College Conference Division II Player of the Week Award for the week of the 2010 game. Coach Paul Patterson coached without shoes for the 2009, 2010, and 2011 games to raise money for Samaritan's Feet (400 pairs of shoes were raised at the 2009 event for the Dominican Republic and 170 pairs of shoes were raised for Guatemala at the 2010 event). Sports Illustrated paid tribute to the Silent Night Event in its December 27, 2010, issue. The 2011 game received significant media attention as well. The 2014 Silent Night game was a 91–59 victory over Kentucky Christian and was covered by ESPN.

=== Cross country ===
The Taylor men's cross country team has qualified for NAIA nationals 32 times. They ran to a runner-up finish in 2019 and went on to win nationals in 2020, giving Taylor its first NAIA national championship in any sport. The program has also won 22 Conference Championships.

The Taylor women's cross country team has qualified for NAIA nationals 15 times. They ran to a third-place finish in both 2018 and 2020. In 2022, the Trojans ran to an undefeated season and won NAIA nationals, scoring only 50 points after being led by fourth-place finisher Abbey Brennan and having all five scoring runners finish in the top 20. The program also has won 12 Conference Championships including ten in a row from 2013 to 2022.

Both teams are currently coached by Taylor alumni and Taylor professor of education Quinn White. Coach White won the USTFCCCA NAIA Men's National Coach of the year award in 2021 and proceeded to win the women's award in 2022. Coach White has also been named Crossroads League coach of the year ten times as well as being named the USTFCCCA Great Lakes Region coach of the year multiple times.

=== Football ===
The Taylor football program competes in the Mideast League of the Mid-States Football Association. The Trojans football team ended the 2009 season ranked #19 in the NAIA coaches poll. They Play At Turner Stadium. They are coached by Aaron Mingo who has coached at Taylor since 2021.

== Venues ==
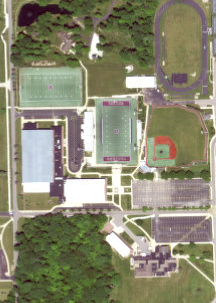
Aerial View of Taylor's athletic venues

Venue	Sport(s)	Capacity	Built	Renovated	Ref.
Turner Stadium	Football; Soccer	4,400	2012	2015, 2022	
Odle Arena	Basketball; Volleyball	1,500	1975	1998, 2012, 2016	
Winterholter Field	Baseball	Unknown	2012	2015, 2017, 2022	
Gudakunst Field	Softball	400+	2013	2015	

=== Other facilities ===
- Kesler Student Activity Center (track and field –indoor, recreational and training activities)
- George Glass Track and Field Complex (track and field, outdoor)
- TUXC Farm (Cross Country)
- Wheeler Field (lacrosse)
- Players Club At Woodland Hills (golf)

== Media ==
Taylor's Games are broadcast on the Trojan Sports Network. The executive producer of the network is Seth Mikel.
