= List of minor planets: 603001–604000 =

The following is a partial list of minor planets, running from minor-planet number 603001 through 604000, inclusive. The primary data for this and other partial lists is based on JPL's "Small-Body Orbital Elements" and data available from the Minor Planet Center. Critical list information is also provided by the MPC, unless otherwise specified from Lowell Observatory. A detailed description of the table's columns and additional sources are given on the main page including a complete list of every page in this series, and a statistical break-up on the dynamical classification of minor planets.

Also see the summary list of all named bodies in numerical and alphabetical order, and the corresponding naming citations for the number range of this particular list. New namings may only be added to this list after official publication, as the preannouncement of names is condemned by the Working Group for Small Bodies Nomenclature of the International Astronomical Union.

Near-Earth obj.	MBA (inner)	MBA (outer)	Centaur
Mars-crosser	MBA (middle)	Jupiter trojan	Trans-Neptunian obj.
Unclassified

== 603001–603100 ==
Designation			Discovery			Properties		Ref
Permanent	Provisional	Named after	Date	Site	Discoverer(s)	Category	Diam.	Ref
603001	2014 UO_{203}	—	April 25, 2008	Kitt Peak	Spacewatch	L5	8.5 km	MPC; JPL
603002	2014 UG_{218}	—	September 17, 2014	Haleakala	Pan-STARRS 1	·	2.5 km	MPC; JPL
603003	2014 UN_{242}	—	October 25, 2014	Haleakala	Pan-STARRS 1	·	1.4 km	MPC; JPL
603004	2014 UW_{254}	—	October 30, 2014	Mount Lemmon	Mount Lemmon Survey	·	1.3 km	MPC; JPL
603005	2014 UD_{256}	—	January 19, 2012	Kitt Peak	Spacewatch	·	480 m	MPC; JPL
603006	2014 UK_{260}	—	October 25, 2014	Haleakala	Pan-STARRS 1	V	510 m	MPC; JPL
603007	2014 UV_{260}	—	October 28, 2014	Haleakala	Pan-STARRS 1	BAR	910 m	MPC; JPL
603008	2014 UD_{273}	—	October 29, 2014	Kitt Peak	Spacewatch	KOR	920 m	MPC; JPL
603009	2014 VB_{3}	—	September 18, 2003	Palomar	NEAT	EOS	2.0 km	MPC; JPL
603010	2014 VQ_{16}	—	October 25, 2014	Kitt Peak	Spacewatch	·	1.6 km	MPC; JPL
603011	2014 VM_{19}	—	September 20, 2014	Haleakala	Pan-STARRS 1	·	2.5 km	MPC; JPL
603012	2014 VQ_{19}	—	October 18, 2014	Mount Lemmon	Mount Lemmon Survey	·	840 m	MPC; JPL
603013	2014 VB_{32}	—	November 14, 2014	Kitt Peak	Spacewatch	·	880 m	MPC; JPL
603014	2014 VL_{34}	—	March 17, 2005	Kitt Peak	Spacewatch	·	820 m	MPC; JPL
603015	2014 VE_{36}	—	October 17, 2001	Kitt Peak	Spacewatch	·	540 m	MPC; JPL
603016	2014 VK_{37}	—	October 16, 2001	Palomar	NEAT	·	1.3 km	MPC; JPL
603017	2014 VB_{42}	—	November 4, 2014	Mount Lemmon	Mount Lemmon Survey	·	630 m	MPC; JPL
603018	2014 WD_{4}	—	October 18, 2003	Palomar	NEAT	·	1.6 km	MPC; JPL
603019	2014 WX_{14}	—	March 24, 2006	Kitt Peak	Spacewatch	·	730 m	MPC; JPL
603020	2014 WE_{16}	—	March 12, 2005	Kitt Peak	Spacewatch	·	690 m	MPC; JPL
603021 Galyatető	2014 WT_{17}	Galyatető	December 31, 2011	Piszkéstető	K. Sárneczky, A. Szing	·	860 m	MPC; JPL
603022	2014 WY_{17}	—	November 16, 2014	Mount Lemmon	Mount Lemmon Survey	·	810 m	MPC; JPL
603023	2014 WO_{19}	—	May 3, 2006	Mount Lemmon	Mount Lemmon Survey	·	630 m	MPC; JPL
603024	2014 WS_{28}	—	December 29, 2011	Mount Lemmon	Mount Lemmon Survey	·	1.1 km	MPC; JPL
603025	2014 WO_{44}	—	October 25, 2014	Haleakala	Pan-STARRS 1	L5	8.3 km	MPC; JPL
603026	2014 WF_{52}	—	November 9, 2007	Kitt Peak	Spacewatch	·	630 m	MPC; JPL
603027	2014 WO_{58}	—	October 30, 2014	Kitt Peak	Spacewatch	·	2.3 km	MPC; JPL
603028	2014 WM_{64}	—	November 2, 2007	Mount Lemmon	Mount Lemmon Survey	·	600 m	MPC; JPL
603029	2014 WY_{68}	—	August 19, 2001	Cerro Tololo	Deep Ecliptic Survey	·	1.0 km	MPC; JPL
603030	2014 WV_{69}	—	March 15, 2012	Haleakala	Pan-STARRS 1	T_{j} (2.96)	4.3 km	MPC; JPL
603031	2014 WZ_{84}	—	March 19, 2009	Kitt Peak	Spacewatch	·	910 m	MPC; JPL
603032	2014 WM_{86}	—	November 17, 2014	Mount Lemmon	Mount Lemmon Survey	·	1.7 km	MPC; JPL
603033	2014 WS_{88}	—	October 22, 2006	Mount Lemmon	Mount Lemmon Survey	·	890 m	MPC; JPL
603034	2014 WD_{95}	—	April 12, 2008	Kitt Peak	Spacewatch	·	1.4 km	MPC; JPL
603035	2014 WT_{97}	—	October 25, 2014	Haleakala	Pan-STARRS 1	·	710 m	MPC; JPL
603036	2014 WD_{104}	—	September 7, 2004	Kitt Peak	Spacewatch	AST	1.4 km	MPC; JPL
603037	2014 WW_{116}	—	November 24, 2009	Kitt Peak	Spacewatch	THM	2.0 km	MPC; JPL
603038	2014 WD_{117}	—	March 26, 2006	Mount Lemmon	Mount Lemmon Survey	EOS	2.0 km	MPC; JPL
603039	2014 WV_{122}	—	August 25, 2003	Palomar	NEAT	(2076)	970 m	MPC; JPL
603040	2014 WL_{123}	—	August 1, 2013	Haleakala	Pan-STARRS 1	·	3.1 km	MPC; JPL
603041	2014 WV_{124}	—	January 1, 2008	Kitt Peak	Spacewatch	NYS	700 m	MPC; JPL
603042	2014 WK_{138}	—	November 8, 2009	Mount Lemmon	Mount Lemmon Survey	615	1.1 km	MPC; JPL
603043	2014 WR_{145}	—	April 7, 2013	Mount Lemmon	Mount Lemmon Survey	·	1.5 km	MPC; JPL
603044	2014 WY_{148}	—	September 24, 2014	Mount Lemmon	Mount Lemmon Survey	EMA	2.6 km	MPC; JPL
603045	2014 WZ_{149}	—	October 25, 2014	Mount Lemmon	Mount Lemmon Survey	·	660 m	MPC; JPL
603046	2014 WS_{150}	—	February 22, 2009	Kitt Peak	Spacewatch	·	830 m	MPC; JPL
603047	2014 WA_{153}	—	October 10, 2007	Mount Lemmon	Mount Lemmon Survey	·	860 m	MPC; JPL
603048	2014 WB_{164}	—	September 24, 2014	Kitt Peak	Spacewatch	SYL	3.3 km	MPC; JPL
603049	2014 WQ_{169}	—	April 9, 2003	Kitt Peak	Spacewatch	·	750 m	MPC; JPL
603050	2014 WF_{170}	—	November 18, 2011	Mount Lemmon	Mount Lemmon Survey	·	740 m	MPC; JPL
603051	2014 WO_{172}	—	October 18, 2009	La Sagra	OAM	·	3.4 km	MPC; JPL
603052	2014 WH_{175}	—	December 9, 2004	Kitt Peak	Spacewatch	·	640 m	MPC; JPL
603053	2014 WP_{178}	—	January 5, 2002	Haleakala	NEAT	·	910 m	MPC; JPL
603054	2014 WX_{180}	—	October 23, 2003	Kitt Peak	Spacewatch	V	510 m	MPC; JPL
603055	2014 WO_{182}	—	September 21, 2009	Mount Lemmon	Mount Lemmon Survey	·	3.0 km	MPC; JPL
603056	2014 WQ_{183}	—	October 20, 2007	Mount Lemmon	Mount Lemmon Survey	·	810 m	MPC; JPL
603057	2014 WN_{187}	—	November 5, 2007	Kitt Peak	Spacewatch	·	640 m	MPC; JPL
603058	2014 WU_{190}	—	November 20, 2014	Haleakala	Pan-STARRS 1	·	640 m	MPC; JPL
603059	2014 WU_{197}	—	February 3, 2009	Mount Lemmon	Mount Lemmon Survey	·	630 m	MPC; JPL
603060	2014 WT_{214}	—	October 14, 2007	Mount Lemmon	Mount Lemmon Survey	·	760 m	MPC; JPL
603061	2014 WC_{218}	—	October 20, 2014	Piszkés-tető	K. Sárneczky, S. Kürti	critical	1.9 km	MPC; JPL
603062	2014 WS_{223}	—	March 31, 2008	Mount Lemmon	Mount Lemmon Survey	·	1.0 km	MPC; JPL
603063	2014 WW_{224}	—	November 18, 2014	Haleakala	Pan-STARRS 1	TIR	2.7 km	MPC; JPL
603064	2014 WU_{228}	—	October 26, 2014	Haleakala	Pan-STARRS 1	(260)	3.1 km	MPC; JPL
603065	2014 WS_{230}	—	February 24, 2012	Mount Lemmon	Mount Lemmon Survey	·	740 m	MPC; JPL
603066	2014 WH_{232}	—	October 24, 2014	Kitt Peak	Spacewatch	·	480 m	MPC; JPL
603067	2014 WC_{242}	—	July 10, 2014	Haleakala	Pan-STARRS 1	BRA	1.6 km	MPC; JPL
603068	2014 WX_{253}	—	November 21, 2014	Haleakala	Pan-STARRS 1	·	650 m	MPC; JPL
603069	2014 WH_{259}	—	October 1, 1995	Kitt Peak	Spacewatch	HOF	1.9 km	MPC; JPL
603070	2014 WL_{263}	—	November 21, 2014	Haleakala	Pan-STARRS 1	·	2.3 km	MPC; JPL
603071	2014 WY_{285}	—	September 20, 2014	Haleakala	Pan-STARRS 1	·	1.1 km	MPC; JPL
603072	2014 WU_{303}	—	July 27, 2009	Catalina	CSS	·	1.6 km	MPC; JPL
603073	2014 WD_{307}	—	October 30, 2014	Mount Lemmon	Mount Lemmon Survey	·	540 m	MPC; JPL
603074	2014 WH_{313}	—	August 23, 2014	Haleakala	Pan-STARRS 1	·	2.1 km	MPC; JPL
603075	2014 WB_{328}	—	August 10, 2007	Kitt Peak	Spacewatch	·	640 m	MPC; JPL
603076	2014 WQ_{334}	—	November 22, 2014	Haleakala	Pan-STARRS 1	·	670 m	MPC; JPL
603077	2014 WE_{358}	—	November 24, 2014	Mount Lemmon	Mount Lemmon Survey	·	1.0 km	MPC; JPL
603078	2014 WE_{359}	—	November 24, 2014	Mount Lemmon	Mount Lemmon Survey	EUN	990 m	MPC; JPL
603079	2014 WB_{360}	—	October 14, 2004	Palomar	NEAT	·	840 m	MPC; JPL
603080	2014 WS_{374}	—	October 22, 2014	Mount Lemmon	Mount Lemmon Survey	·	1.1 km	MPC; JPL
603081	2014 WQ_{387}	—	April 4, 2005	Catalina	CSS	·	1.2 km	MPC; JPL
603082	2014 WV_{389}	—	April 19, 2009	Mount Lemmon	Mount Lemmon Survey	·	930 m	MPC; JPL
603083	2014 WW_{396}	—	July 16, 2013	Haleakala	Pan-STARRS 1	·	2.4 km	MPC; JPL
603084	2014 WS_{402}	—	November 17, 2014	Haleakala	Pan-STARRS 1	·	480 m	MPC; JPL
603085	2014 WY_{404}	—	November 3, 2010	Mount Lemmon	Mount Lemmon Survey	·	1.0 km	MPC; JPL
603086	2014 WJ_{405}	—	October 6, 2008	Kitt Peak	Spacewatch	·	1.7 km	MPC; JPL
603087	2014 WM_{405}	—	December 22, 2008	Kitt Peak	Spacewatch	·	850 m	MPC; JPL
603088	2014 WC_{419}	—	July 15, 2013	Haleakala	Pan-STARRS 1	·	1.3 km	MPC; JPL
603089	2014 WP_{425}	—	November 22, 2014	Haleakala	Pan-STARRS 1	·	1.3 km	MPC; JPL
603090	2014 WN_{434}	—	November 27, 2014	Kitt Peak	Spacewatch	·	700 m	MPC; JPL
603091	2014 WP_{440}	—	September 2, 2010	Mount Lemmon	Mount Lemmon Survey	·	740 m	MPC; JPL
603092	2014 WX_{442}	—	September 12, 2010	Kitt Peak	Spacewatch	·	960 m	MPC; JPL
603093	2014 WW_{443}	—	November 16, 1999	Kitt Peak	Spacewatch	·	1.0 km	MPC; JPL
603094	2014 WB_{445}	—	November 27, 2014	Haleakala	Pan-STARRS 1	·	740 m	MPC; JPL
603095	2014 WE_{452}	—	March 1, 2012	Mount Lemmon	Mount Lemmon Survey	·	900 m	MPC; JPL
603096	2014 WJ_{458}	—	November 27, 2014	Haleakala	Pan-STARRS 1	·	2.3 km	MPC; JPL
603097	2014 WN_{459}	—	May 26, 2006	Mount Lemmon	Mount Lemmon Survey	·	1.0 km	MPC; JPL
603098	2014 WV_{459}	—	June 20, 2013	Haleakala	Pan-STARRS 1	EOS	1.3 km	MPC; JPL
603099	2014 WQ_{466}	—	February 24, 2008	Mount Lemmon	Mount Lemmon Survey	·	670 m	MPC; JPL
603100	2014 WE_{469}	—	February 9, 2005	Kitt Peak	Spacewatch	·	2.4 km	MPC; JPL

== 603101–603200 ==
back to top

Designation			Discovery			Properties		Ref
Permanent	Provisional	Named after	Date	Site	Discoverer(s)	Category	Diam.	Ref
603101	2014 WL_{482}	—	February 23, 2012	Mount Lemmon	Mount Lemmon Survey	·	1.2 km	MPC; JPL
603102	2014 WZ_{484}	—	November 14, 2007	Kitt Peak	Spacewatch	·	740 m	MPC; JPL
603103	2014 WT_{489}	—	April 19, 2012	Mount Lemmon	Mount Lemmon Survey	MAR	710 m	MPC; JPL
603104	2014 WO_{494}	—	June 3, 2005	Kitt Peak	Spacewatch	·	840 m	MPC; JPL
603105	2014 WJ_{505}	—	October 3, 2014	Haleakala	Pan-STARRS 1	T_{j} (2.99)	2.7 km	MPC; JPL
603106	2014 WT_{506}	—	September 12, 2007	Mount Lemmon	Mount Lemmon Survey	·	670 m	MPC; JPL
603107	2014 WO_{507}	—	November 16, 2010	Westfield	International Astronomical Search Collaboration	·	1.7 km	MPC; JPL
603108	2014 WB_{509}	—	November 17, 2014	Haleakala	Pan-STARRS 1	cubewano (hot)	219 km	MPC; JPL
603109	2014 WK_{521}	—	November 20, 2014	Haleakala	Pan-STARRS 1	·	1.2 km	MPC; JPL
603110	2014 WS_{526}	—	November 21, 2014	Haleakala	Pan-STARRS 1	T_{j} (2.91)	3.9 km	MPC; JPL
603111	2014 WN_{537}	—	November 22, 2014	Haleakala	Pan-STARRS 1	·	580 m	MPC; JPL
603112	2014 WS_{538}	—	November 21, 2014	Haleakala	Pan-STARRS 1	·	610 m	MPC; JPL
603113	2014 WT_{544}	—	November 22, 2014	Haleakala	Pan-STARRS 1	·	2.7 km	MPC; JPL
603114	2014 WC_{565}	—	November 20, 2014	Haleakala	Pan-STARRS 1	·	830 m	MPC; JPL
603115	2014 WW_{579}	—	November 21, 2014	Haleakala	Pan-STARRS 1	3:2	5.0 km	MPC; JPL
603116	2014 WY_{588}	—	November 16, 2014	Mount Lemmon	Mount Lemmon Survey	EOS	1.4 km	MPC; JPL
603117	2014 WG_{595}	—	November 29, 2014	Mount Lemmon	Mount Lemmon Survey	·	1.5 km	MPC; JPL
603118	2014 WB_{596}	—	November 26, 2014	Haleakala	Pan-STARRS 1	·	2.1 km	MPC; JPL
603119	2014 WN_{596}	—	November 21, 2014	Haleakala	Pan-STARRS 1	EOS	1.3 km	MPC; JPL
603120	2014 WQ_{596}	—	February 2, 2006	Kitt Peak	Spacewatch	KOR	1.1 km	MPC; JPL
603121	2014 XP	—	March 21, 2004	Kitt Peak	Spacewatch	·	1.9 km	MPC; JPL
603122	2014 XQ	—	November 26, 2014	Haleakala	Pan-STARRS 1	·	1 km	MPC; JPL
603123	2014 XR_{1}	—	January 19, 2008	Mount Lemmon	Mount Lemmon Survey	3:2	5.7 km	MPC; JPL
603124	2014 XR_{5}	—	October 21, 2007	Mount Lemmon	Mount Lemmon Survey	V	550 m	MPC; JPL
603125	2014 XZ_{17}	—	December 31, 2007	Kitt Peak	Spacewatch	·	620 m	MPC; JPL
603126	2014 XN_{18}	—	November 20, 2001	Anderson Mesa	LONEOS	JUN	820 m	MPC; JPL
603127	2014 XM_{19}	—	January 18, 2012	Mount Lemmon	Mount Lemmon Survey	·	500 m	MPC; JPL
603128	2014 XP_{20}	—	October 2, 2013	Haleakala	Pan-STARRS 1	L5	7.2 km	MPC; JPL
603129	2014 XZ_{20}	—	November 22, 2006	Mount Lemmon	Mount Lemmon Survey	·	870 m	MPC; JPL
603130	2014 XQ_{22}	—	June 8, 2002	Socorro	LINEAR	·	970 m	MPC; JPL
603131	2014 XN_{24}	—	September 13, 2005	Kitt Peak	Spacewatch	·	1.3 km	MPC; JPL
603132	2014 XJ_{25}	—	February 28, 2008	Mount Lemmon	Mount Lemmon Survey	MAS	550 m	MPC; JPL
603133	2014 XC_{30}	—	November 29, 2014	Mount Lemmon	Mount Lemmon Survey	·	1.0 km	MPC; JPL
603134	2014 XD_{30}	—	December 13, 2014	Haleakala	Pan-STARRS 1	·	1.3 km	MPC; JPL
603135	2014 XE_{30}	—	March 3, 2003	Palomar	NEAT	·	1.8 km	MPC; JPL
603136	2014 XC_{33}	—	April 15, 2005	Kitt Peak	Spacewatch	·	910 m	MPC; JPL
603137	2014 XA_{41}	—	August 30, 2013	Haleakala	Pan-STARRS 1	H	460 m	MPC; JPL
603138	2014 XN_{42}	—	December 2, 2014	Haleakala	Pan-STARRS 1	EUN	1.2 km	MPC; JPL
603139	2014 YA_{2}	—	October 18, 2009	Mount Lemmon	Mount Lemmon Survey	·	1.4 km	MPC; JPL
603140	2014 YY_{4}	—	December 19, 2014	ESA OGS	ESA OGS	·	620 m	MPC; JPL
603141	2014 YU_{8}	—	December 20, 2014	Haleakala	Pan-STARRS 1	·	1.9 km	MPC; JPL
603142	2014 YA_{16}	—	March 11, 2008	Mount Lemmon	Mount Lemmon Survey	·	820 m	MPC; JPL
603143	2014 YP_{17}	—	January 12, 2008	Mount Lemmon	Mount Lemmon Survey	·	1.4 km	MPC; JPL
603144	2014 YM_{20}	—	October 10, 2008	Mount Lemmon	Mount Lemmon Survey	·	2.1 km	MPC; JPL
603145	2014 YY_{24}	—	October 23, 2003	Kitt Peak	Deep Ecliptic Survey	·	950 m	MPC; JPL
603146	2014 YS_{26}	—	December 10, 2014	Mount Lemmon	Mount Lemmon Survey	·	900 m	MPC; JPL
603147	2014 YY_{29}	—	November 8, 2009	Mount Lemmon	Mount Lemmon Survey	·	1.7 km	MPC; JPL
603148	2014 YH_{38}	—	December 29, 2003	Anderson Mesa	LONEOS	H	640 m	MPC; JPL
603149	2014 YK_{40}	—	November 16, 2003	Kitt Peak	Spacewatch	NYS	840 m	MPC; JPL
603150	2014 YT_{46}	—	January 11, 2011	Mount Lemmon	Mount Lemmon Survey	·	1.1 km	MPC; JPL
603151	2014 YV_{46}	—	December 21, 2014	Haleakala	Pan-STARRS 1	·	1.5 km	MPC; JPL
603152	2014 YX_{54}	—	November 26, 2013	Nogales	M. Schwartz, P. R. Holvorcem	HNS	1.3 km	MPC; JPL
603153	2014 YU_{57}	—	January 4, 2003	Kitt Peak	Deep Lens Survey	PHO	790 m	MPC; JPL
603154	2014 YV_{61}	—	December 26, 2014	Haleakala	Pan-STARRS 1	·	890 m	MPC; JPL
603155	2014 YS_{62}	—	August 4, 2005	Palomar	NEAT	PHO	820 m	MPC; JPL
603156	2014 YD_{65}	—	December 29, 2014	Haleakala	Pan-STARRS 1	·	460 m	MPC; JPL
603157	2014 YV_{66}	—	December 16, 2014	Haleakala	Pan-STARRS 1	ELF	2.5 km	MPC; JPL
603158	2014 YC_{80}	—	December 29, 2014	Haleakala	Pan-STARRS 1	·	1.3 km	MPC; JPL
603159	2014 YY_{89}	—	December 29, 2014	Haleakala	Pan-STARRS 1	·	530 m	MPC; JPL
603160	2014 YZ_{89}	—	December 21, 2014	Haleakala	Pan-STARRS 1	NAE	2.0 km	MPC; JPL
603161	2015 AA_{1}	—	May 14, 2004	Kitt Peak	Spacewatch	·	1.4 km	MPC; JPL
603162	2015 AB_{14}	—	November 10, 2005	Catalina	CSS	EUN	1.1 km	MPC; JPL
603163	2015 AO_{15}	—	September 25, 2009	Catalina	CSS	·	1.6 km	MPC; JPL
603164	2015 AT_{16}	—	February 7, 2007	Kitt Peak	Spacewatch	·	850 m	MPC; JPL
603165	2015 AR_{19}	—	September 21, 2003	Kitt Peak	Spacewatch	·	620 m	MPC; JPL
603166	2015 AM_{24}	—	October 12, 2010	Mount Lemmon	Mount Lemmon Survey	·	1.1 km	MPC; JPL
603167	2015 AX_{25}	—	January 12, 2015	Haleakala	Pan-STARRS 1	·	990 m	MPC; JPL
603168	2015 AA_{27}	—	March 17, 2004	Kitt Peak	Spacewatch	·	800 m	MPC; JPL
603169	2015 AH_{32}	—	December 29, 2014	Mount Lemmon	Mount Lemmon Survey	3:2	3.9 km	MPC; JPL
603170	2015 AM_{32}	—	September 28, 2006	Kitt Peak	Spacewatch	·	1.1 km	MPC; JPL
603171	2015 AF_{35}	—	November 15, 2006	Mount Lemmon	Mount Lemmon Survey	·	1 km	MPC; JPL
603172	2015 AM_{40}	—	April 3, 2008	Kitt Peak	Spacewatch	·	1.1 km	MPC; JPL
603173	2015 AV_{53}	—	October 30, 2010	Piszkés-tető	K. Sárneczky, Z. Kuli	·	1.0 km	MPC; JPL
603174	2015 AC_{58}	—	March 16, 2012	Mount Lemmon	Mount Lemmon Survey	·	620 m	MPC; JPL
603175	2015 AN_{62}	—	October 20, 2007	Mount Lemmon	Mount Lemmon Survey	·	530 m	MPC; JPL
603176	2015 AH_{64}	—	October 29, 2010	Kitt Peak	Spacewatch	·	1.2 km	MPC; JPL
603177	2015 AH_{68}	—	September 13, 2007	Mount Lemmon	Mount Lemmon Survey	THM	2.0 km	MPC; JPL
603178	2015 AN_{72}	—	May 26, 2008	Kitt Peak	Spacewatch	·	1.2 km	MPC; JPL
603179	2015 AX_{75}	—	December 21, 2014	Haleakala	Pan-STARRS 1	·	1.8 km	MPC; JPL
603180	2015 AZ_{78}	—	January 27, 2007	Kitt Peak	Spacewatch	·	930 m	MPC; JPL
603181	2015 AT_{79}	—	July 14, 2013	Haleakala	Pan-STARRS 1	·	690 m	MPC; JPL
603182	2015 AJ_{85}	—	November 10, 2009	Kitt Peak	Spacewatch	·	1.3 km	MPC; JPL
603183	2015 AY_{86}	—	January 19, 2012	Haleakala	Pan-STARRS 1	·	520 m	MPC; JPL
603184	2015 AS_{87}	—	March 4, 2012	Kitt Peak	Spacewatch	·	750 m	MPC; JPL
603185	2015 AX_{94}	—	September 25, 2003	Palomar	NEAT	·	830 m	MPC; JPL
603186	2015 AX_{110}	—	December 23, 2014	Kitt Peak	Spacewatch	·	1.5 km	MPC; JPL
603187	2015 AM_{114}	—	December 21, 2014	Haleakala	Pan-STARRS 1	·	2.5 km	MPC; JPL
603188	2015 AY_{116}	—	October 2, 2013	Mount Lemmon	Mount Lemmon Survey	KOR	1.0 km	MPC; JPL
603189	2015 AM_{139}	—	October 8, 2007	Mount Lemmon	Mount Lemmon Survey	·	2.3 km	MPC; JPL
603190	2015 AO_{147}	—	April 30, 2012	Mount Lemmon	Mount Lemmon Survey	·	770 m	MPC; JPL
603191	2015 AJ_{156}	—	December 26, 2014	Haleakala	Pan-STARRS 1	H	510 m	MPC; JPL
603192	2015 AY_{161}	—	September 13, 2013	Mount Lemmon	Mount Lemmon Survey	·	2.0 km	MPC; JPL
603193	2015 AN_{164}	—	January 24, 2006	Kitt Peak	Spacewatch	·	1.5 km	MPC; JPL
603194	2015 AO_{168}	—	March 30, 2008	Kitt Peak	Spacewatch	MAS	580 m	MPC; JPL
603195 Gilmour	2015 AL_{177}	Gilmour	October 22, 2009	Mount Lemmon	Mount Lemmon Survey	·	1.4 km	MPC; JPL
603196	2015 AS_{182}	—	April 24, 2007	Mount Lemmon	Mount Lemmon Survey	·	1.3 km	MPC; JPL
603197	2015 AG_{183}	—	January 14, 2015	Haleakala	Pan-STARRS 1	·	1.4 km	MPC; JPL
603198	2015 AP_{186}	—	August 24, 2008	Kitt Peak	Spacewatch	KOR	1.1 km	MPC; JPL
603199	2015 AT_{194}	—	April 25, 2007	Mount Lemmon	Mount Lemmon Survey	·	1.7 km	MPC; JPL
603200 Yuchichung	2015 AY_{209}	Yuchichung	July 5, 2006	Lulin	LUSS	·	1.0 km	MPC; JPL

== 603201–603300 ==
back to top

Designation			Discovery			Properties		Ref
Permanent	Provisional	Named after	Date	Site	Discoverer(s)	Category	Diam.	Ref
603201	2015 AV_{213}	—	January 15, 2015	Haleakala	Pan-STARRS 1	ARM	2.5 km	MPC; JPL
603202	2015 AX_{218}	—	April 7, 2005	Mount Lemmon	Mount Lemmon Survey	·	1.1 km	MPC; JPL
603203	2015 AB_{230}	—	March 21, 2001	Kitt Peak	SKADS	ERI	1.0 km	MPC; JPL
603204	2015 AS_{232}	—	September 10, 2007	Mount Lemmon	Mount Lemmon Survey	·	1.8 km	MPC; JPL
603205	2015 AE_{242}	—	January 15, 2015	Haleakala	Pan-STARRS 1	PHO	770 m	MPC; JPL
603206	2015 AJ_{243}	—	September 19, 2006	Catalina	CSS	·	990 m	MPC; JPL
603207	2015 AJ_{244}	—	March 16, 2007	Catalina	CSS	·	1.4 km	MPC; JPL
603208	2015 AP_{245}	—	November 27, 2014	Haleakala	Pan-STARRS 1	PHO	810 m	MPC; JPL
603209	2015 AV_{256}	—	March 2, 2012	Mount Lemmon	Mount Lemmon Survey	·	650 m	MPC; JPL
603210	2015 AY_{258}	—	March 16, 2012	Kitt Peak	Spacewatch	·	580 m	MPC; JPL
603211	2015 AL_{259}	—	January 14, 2002	Palomar	NEAT	·	770 m	MPC; JPL
603212	2015 AS_{261}	—	August 17, 2006	Palomar	NEAT	·	1 km	MPC; JPL
603213	2015 AG_{262}	—	October 17, 2003	Kitt Peak	Spacewatch	·	670 m	MPC; JPL
603214	2015 AR_{281}	—	July 27, 2011	Haleakala	Pan-STARRS 1	H	340 m	MPC; JPL
603215	2015 AW_{292}	—	March 2, 2008	Kitt Peak	Spacewatch	·	810 m	MPC; JPL
603216	2015 AN_{299}	—	January 14, 2015	Haleakala	Pan-STARRS 1	(18466)	1.7 km	MPC; JPL
603217	2015 BT_{6}	—	October 2, 2006	Kitt Peak	Spacewatch	·	1.3 km	MPC; JPL
603218	2015 BM_{9}	—	December 21, 2014	Haleakala	Pan-STARRS 1	·	1.6 km	MPC; JPL
603219	2015 BF_{11}	—	October 23, 2006	Kitt Peak	Spacewatch	·	1.0 km	MPC; JPL
603220	2015 BF_{13}	—	April 1, 2003	Apache Point	SDSS Collaboration	·	1.7 km	MPC; JPL
603221	2015 BB_{17}	—	October 27, 2009	Kitt Peak	Spacewatch	·	1.7 km	MPC; JPL
603222	2015 BW_{20}	—	July 15, 2013	Haleakala	Pan-STARRS 1	·	1.1 km	MPC; JPL
603223	2015 BA_{21}	—	November 23, 2006	Kitt Peak	Spacewatch	·	1.2 km	MPC; JPL
603224	2015 BK_{22}	—	August 6, 2005	Palomar	NEAT	T_{j} (2.81)	4.4 km	MPC; JPL
603225	2015 BR_{22}	—	September 6, 2008	Kitt Peak	Spacewatch	·	1.6 km	MPC; JPL
603226	2015 BC_{23}	—	January 17, 2004	Palomar	NEAT	·	930 m	MPC; JPL
603227	2015 BZ_{24}	—	January 13, 2010	Mount Lemmon	Mount Lemmon Survey	·	1.8 km	MPC; JPL
603228	2015 BE_{25}	—	January 16, 2015	Haleakala	Pan-STARRS 1	EOS	1.4 km	MPC; JPL
603229	2015 BY_{26}	—	December 31, 2008	Kitt Peak	Spacewatch	·	2.3 km	MPC; JPL
603230	2015 BO_{31}	—	January 23, 2006	Kitt Peak	Spacewatch	·	1.9 km	MPC; JPL
603231	2015 BW_{31}	—	November 1, 2006	Mount Lemmon	Mount Lemmon Survey	·	930 m	MPC; JPL
603232	2015 BG_{32}	—	May 1, 2009	Mount Lemmon	Mount Lemmon Survey	·	510 m	MPC; JPL
603233	2015 BN_{32}	—	February 16, 2012	Haleakala	Pan-STARRS 1	·	680 m	MPC; JPL
603234	2015 BP_{34}	—	January 16, 2015	Haleakala	Pan-STARRS 1	GEF	1.1 km	MPC; JPL
603235	2015 BR_{36}	—	January 16, 2015	Haleakala	Pan-STARRS 1	·	1.2 km	MPC; JPL
603236	2015 BX_{36}	—	October 10, 2012	Mount Lemmon	Mount Lemmon Survey	·	1.9 km	MPC; JPL
603237	2015 BD_{42}	—	November 17, 2009	Kitt Peak	Spacewatch	·	1.6 km	MPC; JPL
603238	2015 BT_{42}	—	November 16, 2009	Mount Lemmon	Mount Lemmon Survey	·	1.9 km	MPC; JPL
603239	2015 BB_{44}	—	June 17, 2013	Haleakala	Pan-STARRS 1	·	1.4 km	MPC; JPL
603240	2015 BF_{45}	—	July 12, 2001	Palomar	NEAT	·	1.6 km	MPC; JPL
603241	2015 BJ_{45}	—	February 21, 2012	Kitt Peak	Spacewatch	·	520 m	MPC; JPL
603242	2015 BS_{46}	—	September 4, 2007	Catalina	CSS	·	720 m	MPC; JPL
603243	2015 BU_{59}	—	February 9, 2008	Kitt Peak	Spacewatch	·	790 m	MPC; JPL
603244	2015 BM_{61}	—	October 29, 2005	Kitt Peak	Spacewatch	·	1 km	MPC; JPL
603245	2015 BB_{62}	—	November 10, 2004	Kitt Peak	Deep Ecliptic Survey	AGN	1.5 km	MPC; JPL
603246	2015 BZ_{64}	—	January 15, 2004	Kitt Peak	Spacewatch	·	760 m	MPC; JPL
603247	2015 BM_{67}	—	March 9, 2007	Kitt Peak	Spacewatch	·	890 m	MPC; JPL
603248	2015 BS_{69}	—	March 30, 2003	Kitt Peak	Deep Ecliptic Survey	·	1.1 km	MPC; JPL
603249	2015 BD_{75}	—	January 13, 2008	Kitt Peak	Spacewatch	·	770 m	MPC; JPL
603250	2015 BA_{78}	—	February 25, 2012	Mount Lemmon	Mount Lemmon Survey	·	890 m	MPC; JPL
603251	2015 BL_{88}	—	March 15, 2004	Kitt Peak	Spacewatch	·	840 m	MPC; JPL
603252	2015 BM_{91}	—	October 28, 2010	Mount Lemmon	Mount Lemmon Survey	·	720 m	MPC; JPL
603253	2015 BP_{91}	—	February 3, 2011	Piszkés-tető	K. Sárneczky, Z. Kuli	·	800 m	MPC; JPL
603254	2015 BV_{93}	—	January 10, 2010	Kitt Peak	Spacewatch	·	1.5 km	MPC; JPL
603255	2015 BQ_{99}	—	November 27, 2014	Mount Lemmon	Mount Lemmon Survey	·	1.3 km	MPC; JPL
603256	2015 BV_{106}	—	February 7, 2011	Mount Lemmon	Mount Lemmon Survey	·	980 m	MPC; JPL
603257	2015 BE_{107}	—	January 16, 2015	Haleakala	Pan-STARRS 1	·	1.1 km	MPC; JPL
603258	2015 BL_{107}	—	January 16, 2015	Haleakala	Pan-STARRS 1	EUN	1.0 km	MPC; JPL
603259	2015 BM_{107}	—	May 28, 2012	Mount Lemmon	Mount Lemmon Survey	·	1.4 km	MPC; JPL
603260 Jónáskároly	2015 BQ_{118}	Jónáskároly	September 28, 2013	Piszkéstető	T. Csörgei, K. Sárneczky	·	1.7 km	MPC; JPL
603261	2015 BW_{118}	—	July 9, 2013	Haleakala	Pan-STARRS 1	H	390 m	MPC; JPL
603262	2015 BT_{123}	—	January 17, 2015	Haleakala	Pan-STARRS 1	·	1.7 km	MPC; JPL
603263	2015 BD_{126}	—	October 12, 1993	Kitt Peak	Spacewatch	·	1.0 km	MPC; JPL
603264	2015 BM_{131}	—	January 17, 2015	Haleakala	Pan-STARRS 1	·	1.1 km	MPC; JPL
603265	2015 BK_{134}	—	October 6, 2004	Kitt Peak	Spacewatch	AGN	1.0 km	MPC; JPL
603266	2015 BU_{141}	—	January 17, 2015	Haleakala	Pan-STARRS 1	V	480 m	MPC; JPL
603267	2015 BM_{146}	—	February 12, 2004	Kitt Peak	Spacewatch	MAS	680 m	MPC; JPL
603268	2015 BN_{147}	—	January 17, 2015	Haleakala	Pan-STARRS 1	·	550 m	MPC; JPL
603269	2015 BU_{147}	—	January 17, 2015	Haleakala	Pan-STARRS 1	·	990 m	MPC; JPL
603270	2015 BG_{148}	—	September 3, 2013	Mount Lemmon	Mount Lemmon Survey	·	940 m	MPC; JPL
603271	2015 BO_{150}	—	February 2, 2008	Mount Lemmon	Mount Lemmon Survey	V	480 m	MPC; JPL
603272	2015 BJ_{153}	—	May 28, 2012	Mount Lemmon	Mount Lemmon Survey	·	1.4 km	MPC; JPL
603273	2015 BZ_{158}	—	November 9, 2007	Kitt Peak	Spacewatch	·	520 m	MPC; JPL
603274	2015 BY_{165}	—	September 13, 2013	Catalina	CSS	·	2.4 km	MPC; JPL
603275	2015 BZ_{165}	—	January 14, 2011	Mount Lemmon	Mount Lemmon Survey	PHO	720 m	MPC; JPL
603276	2015 BC_{191}	—	December 13, 2010	Mauna Kea	M. Micheli, L. Wells	·	1.4 km	MPC; JPL
603277	2015 BL_{194}	—	July 18, 2012	Mayhill-ISON	L. Elenin	·	1.2 km	MPC; JPL
603278	2015 BO_{202}	—	October 23, 2003	Apache Point	SDSS Collaboration	·	640 m	MPC; JPL
603279	2015 BV_{206}	—	December 4, 2005	Kitt Peak	Spacewatch	NEM	1.8 km	MPC; JPL
603280	2015 BY_{208}	—	November 8, 2007	Kitt Peak	Spacewatch	·	560 m	MPC; JPL
603281	2015 BX_{214}	—	February 9, 2008	Kitt Peak	Spacewatch	·	1.2 km	MPC; JPL
603282	2015 BL_{217}	—	December 26, 2014	Haleakala	Pan-STARRS 1	·	1.3 km	MPC; JPL
603283	2015 BG_{219}	—	November 9, 2009	Kitt Peak	Spacewatch	·	1.4 km	MPC; JPL
603284	2015 BK_{222}	—	February 9, 2008	Kitt Peak	Spacewatch	·	880 m	MPC; JPL
603285	2015 BS_{223}	—	September 5, 2013	Kitt Peak	Spacewatch	·	1.7 km	MPC; JPL
603286	2015 BD_{224}	—	December 25, 2005	Kitt Peak	Spacewatch	·	1.3 km	MPC; JPL
603287	2015 BQ_{224}	—	April 4, 2005	Mount Lemmon	Mount Lemmon Survey	·	2.5 km	MPC; JPL
603288	2015 BB_{226}	—	May 20, 2005	Mount Lemmon	Mount Lemmon Survey	V	520 m	MPC; JPL
603289	2015 BD_{229}	—	December 21, 2014	Haleakala	Pan-STARRS 1	·	850 m	MPC; JPL
603290	2015 BA_{237}	—	January 18, 2008	Kitt Peak	Spacewatch	·	610 m	MPC; JPL
603291	2015 BX_{241}	—	January 18, 2015	Haleakala	Pan-STARRS 1	·	2.3 km	MPC; JPL
603292	2015 BS_{244}	—	August 12, 2013	Haleakala	Pan-STARRS 1	·	1.1 km	MPC; JPL
603293	2015 BH_{248}	—	February 4, 2003	La Silla	Barbieri, C.	·	970 m	MPC; JPL
603294	2015 BK_{250}	—	July 9, 2005	Kitt Peak	Spacewatch	NYS	980 m	MPC; JPL
603295	2015 BD_{252}	—	December 18, 2014	Haleakala	Pan-STARRS 1	EOS	1.6 km	MPC; JPL
603296	2015 BP_{255}	—	April 29, 2008	Mount Lemmon	Mount Lemmon Survey	NYS	1.3 km	MPC; JPL
603297	2015 BB_{257}	—	February 7, 2008	Mount Lemmon	Mount Lemmon Survey	·	810 m	MPC; JPL
603298	2015 BD_{260}	—	January 18, 2015	Haleakala	Pan-STARRS 1	·	2.3 km	MPC; JPL
603299	2015 BX_{261}	—	May 12, 1997	Mauna Kea	Veillet, C.	·	1.7 km	MPC; JPL
603300	2015 BH_{265}	—	March 11, 2008	Kitt Peak	Spacewatch	·	1.0 km	MPC; JPL

== 603301–603400 ==
back to top

Designation			Discovery			Properties		Ref
Permanent	Provisional	Named after	Date	Site	Discoverer(s)	Category	Diam.	Ref
603301	2015 BC_{267}	—	May 30, 2006	Mount Lemmon	Mount Lemmon Survey	URS	2.8 km	MPC; JPL
603302	2015 BV_{288}	—	January 19, 2015	Haleakala	Pan-STARRS 1	·	1.5 km	MPC; JPL
603303	2015 BV_{294}	—	July 7, 2013	Kitt Peak	Spacewatch	·	720 m	MPC; JPL
603304	2015 BU_{300}	—	October 25, 2001	Apache Point	SDSS	·	1.5 km	MPC; JPL
603305	2015 BA_{302}	—	April 25, 2007	Mount Lemmon	Mount Lemmon Survey	BRG	1.2 km	MPC; JPL
603306	2015 BH_{309}	—	November 24, 2002	Palomar	NEAT	·	1.2 km	MPC; JPL
603307	2015 BU_{309}	—	March 20, 2001	Kitt Peak	Spacewatch	·	1.8 km	MPC; JPL
603308	2015 BZ_{309}	—	January 20, 2015	Mount Lemmon	Mount Lemmon Survey	·	1.0 km	MPC; JPL
603309	2015 BJ_{317}	—	July 14, 2013	Haleakala	Pan-STARRS 1	V	500 m	MPC; JPL
603310	2015 BL_{317}	—	February 8, 2011	Mount Lemmon	Mount Lemmon Survey	·	970 m	MPC; JPL
603311	2015 BV_{326}	—	August 22, 2004	Kitt Peak	Spacewatch	·	1.1 km	MPC; JPL
603312	2015 BH_{333}	—	September 27, 2006	Kitt Peak	Spacewatch	NYS	780 m	MPC; JPL
603313	2015 BH_{337}	—	January 17, 2015	Haleakala	Pan-STARRS 1	·	1.3 km	MPC; JPL
603314	2015 BK_{339}	—	April 7, 2003	Kitt Peak	Spacewatch	·	1.1 km	MPC; JPL
603315	2015 BF_{340}	—	January 17, 2015	Haleakala	Pan-STARRS 1	·	930 m	MPC; JPL
603316	2015 BM_{342}	—	January 14, 2008	Kitt Peak	Spacewatch	V	430 m	MPC; JPL
603317	2015 BH_{345}	—	February 16, 2004	Kitt Peak	Spacewatch	·	1.1 km	MPC; JPL
603318	2015 BP_{348}	—	May 12, 2007	Mount Lemmon	Mount Lemmon Survey	·	1.7 km	MPC; JPL
603319	2015 BJ_{352}	—	May 8, 2011	Kitt Peak	Spacewatch	·	2.4 km	MPC; JPL
603320	2015 BU_{355}	—	August 21, 2004	Mauna Kea	D. D. Balam	·	1.1 km	MPC; JPL
603321	2015 BZ_{355}	—	January 27, 2011	Mount Lemmon	Mount Lemmon Survey	·	920 m	MPC; JPL
603322	2015 BM_{357}	—	November 10, 2010	Mount Lemmon	Mount Lemmon Survey	·	600 m	MPC; JPL
603323	2015 BR_{358}	—	September 9, 2013	Haleakala	Pan-STARRS 1	·	860 m	MPC; JPL
603324	2015 BJ_{371}	—	October 3, 2013	Haleakala	Pan-STARRS 1	·	1.6 km	MPC; JPL
603325	2015 BT_{371}	—	April 28, 2008	Mount Lemmon	Mount Lemmon Survey	·	1.0 km	MPC; JPL
603326	2015 BU_{378}	—	April 20, 2012	Haleakala	Pan-STARRS 1	·	550 m	MPC; JPL
603327	2015 BC_{393}	—	November 4, 2007	Mount Lemmon	Mount Lemmon Survey	·	660 m	MPC; JPL
603328	2015 BM_{396}	—	November 9, 2013	Mount Lemmon	Mount Lemmon Survey	KON	1.8 km	MPC; JPL
603329	2015 BN_{415}	—	March 5, 2011	Mount Lemmon	Mount Lemmon Survey	MAR	700 m	MPC; JPL
603330	2015 BV_{420}	—	January 20, 2015	Haleakala	Pan-STARRS 1	·	940 m	MPC; JPL
603331	2015 BK_{422}	—	February 12, 2008	Kitt Peak	Spacewatch	·	670 m	MPC; JPL
603332	2015 BF_{433}	—	April 21, 2012	Kitt Peak	Spacewatch	·	520 m	MPC; JPL
603333	2015 BS_{437}	—	March 4, 2011	Mount Lemmon	Mount Lemmon Survey	·	1.0 km	MPC; JPL
603334	2015 BW_{439}	—	March 31, 2003	Apache Point	SDSS Collaboration	MAR	840 m	MPC; JPL
603335	2015 BT_{441}	—	January 20, 2015	Haleakala	Pan-STARRS 1	·	1.4 km	MPC; JPL
603336	2015 BV_{445}	—	January 20, 2015	Haleakala	Pan-STARRS 1	·	740 m	MPC; JPL
603337	2015 BA_{449}	—	March 9, 2011	Mount Lemmon	Mount Lemmon Survey	·	1.0 km	MPC; JPL
603338	2015 BS_{449}	—	January 20, 2015	Haleakala	Pan-STARRS 1	·	1 km	MPC; JPL
603339	2015 BY_{460}	—	July 7, 2005	Mauna Kea	Veillet, C.	·	800 m	MPC; JPL
603340	2015 BB_{472}	—	January 20, 2015	Haleakala	Pan-STARRS 1	·	1.4 km	MPC; JPL
603341	2015 BA_{474}	—	August 9, 2013	Kitt Peak	Spacewatch	·	610 m	MPC; JPL
603342	2015 BP_{477}	—	February 3, 2010	Sandlot	G. Hug	·	1.8 km	MPC; JPL
603343	2015 BH_{479}	—	August 15, 2013	Haleakala	Pan-STARRS 1	·	770 m	MPC; JPL
603344	2015 BK_{484}	—	September 18, 2003	Kitt Peak	Spacewatch	·	1.6 km	MPC; JPL
603345	2015 BL_{484}	—	September 19, 2003	Kitt Peak	Spacewatch	·	590 m	MPC; JPL
603346	2015 BS_{491}	—	November 14, 2013	Mount Lemmon	Mount Lemmon Survey	EOS	1.5 km	MPC; JPL
603347	2015 BT_{492}	—	April 30, 2011	Mount Lemmon	Mount Lemmon Survey	KOR	1.1 km	MPC; JPL
603348	2015 BO_{500}	—	August 27, 2009	Kitt Peak	Spacewatch	NYS	750 m	MPC; JPL
603349	2015 BU_{504}	—	January 20, 2015	Haleakala	Pan-STARRS 1	EOS	1.5 km	MPC; JPL
603350	2015 BB_{509}	—	October 22, 2014	Mount Lemmon	Mount Lemmon Survey	·	1.7 km	MPC; JPL
603351	2015 BN_{511}	—	September 19, 2009	Kitt Peak	Spacewatch	·	1.2 km	MPC; JPL
603352	2015 BW_{515}	—	December 21, 2014	Kitt Peak	Spacewatch	H	520 m	MPC; JPL
603353	2015 BR_{520}	—	July 17, 2013	Haleakala	Pan-STARRS 1	H	390 m	MPC; JPL
603354	2015 BE_{531}	—	January 21, 2015	Haleakala	Pan-STARRS 1	·	1.2 km	MPC; JPL
603355	2015 BC_{532}	—	January 23, 2015	Haleakala	Pan-STARRS 1	MAS	510 m	MPC; JPL
603356	2015 BR_{535}	—	March 18, 2004	Apache Point	SDSS Collaboration	V	700 m	MPC; JPL
603357	2015 BU_{539}	—	May 10, 2007	Mount Lemmon	Mount Lemmon Survey	EUN	990 m	MPC; JPL
603358	2015 BL_{542}	—	October 16, 2012	Kitt Peak	Spacewatch	·	2.9 km	MPC; JPL
603359	2015 BN_{547}	—	November 12, 2006	Mount Lemmon	Mount Lemmon Survey	·	820 m	MPC; JPL
603360	2015 BF_{549}	—	January 20, 2015	Haleakala	Pan-STARRS 1	·	1.0 km	MPC; JPL
603361	2015 BZ_{551}	—	January 28, 2015	Haleakala	Pan-STARRS 1	·	1.5 km	MPC; JPL
603362	2015 BQ_{556}	—	November 15, 2006	Kitt Peak	Spacewatch	·	1.3 km	MPC; JPL
603363	2015 BK_{565}	—	November 2, 2013	Mount Lemmon	Mount Lemmon Survey	(5)	1.1 km	MPC; JPL
603364	2015 BR_{566}	—	February 24, 2012	Kitt Peak	Spacewatch	·	680 m	MPC; JPL
603365	2015 BV_{568}	—	January 26, 2015	Haleakala	Pan-STARRS 1	·	1.2 km	MPC; JPL
603366	2015 BP_{569}	—	April 5, 2016	Haleakala	Pan-STARRS 1	·	980 m	MPC; JPL
603367	2015 BV_{569}	—	February 19, 2002	Kitt Peak	Spacewatch	(1547)	1.2 km	MPC; JPL
603368	2015 BA_{579}	—	June 4, 2017	Mount Lemmon	Mount Lemmon Survey	·	3.4 km	MPC; JPL
603369	2015 BZ_{585}	—	January 19, 2015	Catalina	CSS	H	440 m	MPC; JPL
603370	2015 BG_{590}	—	January 30, 2015	Haleakala	Pan-STARRS 1	L4	7.4 km	MPC; JPL
603371	2015 BH_{590}	—	June 3, 2011	Nogales	M. Schwartz, P. R. Holvorcem	·	1.6 km	MPC; JPL
603372	2015 BE_{597}	—	January 28, 2015	Haleakala	Pan-STARRS 1	L4	6.2 km	MPC; JPL
603373	2015 BH_{603}	—	January 21, 2015	Haleakala	Pan-STARRS 1	·	1.1 km	MPC; JPL
603374	2015 BM_{604}	—	January 28, 2015	Haleakala	Pan-STARRS 1	MAR	840 m	MPC; JPL
603375	2015 BE_{608}	—	January 28, 2015	Haleakala	Pan-STARRS 1	L4	6.7 km	MPC; JPL
603376	2015 CD_{2}	—	December 21, 2014	Mount Lemmon	Mount Lemmon Survey	NYS	1.1 km	MPC; JPL
603377	2015 CB_{5}	—	February 28, 2008	Kitt Peak	Spacewatch	NYS	870 m	MPC; JPL
603378	2015 CW_{7}	—	September 1, 2013	Haleakala	Pan-STARRS 1	·	700 m	MPC; JPL
603379	2015 CU_{12}	—	January 18, 2015	Haleakala	Pan-STARRS 1	H	420 m	MPC; JPL
603380 Dorisbrougham	2015 CO_{17}	Dorisbrougham	February 26, 2008	Lulin	LUSS	·	820 m	MPC; JPL
603381	2015 CP_{17}	—	March 5, 2008	Mount Lemmon	Mount Lemmon Survey	·	790 m	MPC; JPL
603382	2015 CY_{17}	—	August 31, 2005	Palomar	NEAT	·	1.3 km	MPC; JPL
603383	2015 CR_{19}	—	March 25, 2000	Kitt Peak	Spacewatch	·	1.1 km	MPC; JPL
603384	2015 CB_{20}	—	February 2, 2006	Kitt Peak	Spacewatch	·	2.0 km	MPC; JPL
603385	2015 CT_{23}	—	December 2, 2010	Mount Lemmon	Mount Lemmon Survey	·	660 m	MPC; JPL
603386	2015 CO_{26}	—	April 15, 2008	Mount Lemmon	Mount Lemmon Survey	·	760 m	MPC; JPL
603387	2015 CU_{28}	—	March 2, 2011	Catalina	CSS	·	1.0 km	MPC; JPL
603388	2015 CJ_{29}	—	March 10, 2003	Palomar	NEAT	·	1.1 km	MPC; JPL
603389	2015 CA_{30}	—	January 22, 2015	Haleakala	Pan-STARRS 1	·	970 m	MPC; JPL
603390	2015 CV_{31}	—	February 1, 2009	Mount Lemmon	Mount Lemmon Survey	·	2.5 km	MPC; JPL
603391	2015 CH_{37}	—	April 2, 2011	Mount Lemmon	Mount Lemmon Survey	·	1.6 km	MPC; JPL
603392	2015 CH_{47}	—	October 2, 2006	Mount Lemmon	Mount Lemmon Survey	V	600 m	MPC; JPL
603393	2015 CW_{48}	—	April 19, 2007	Mount Lemmon	Mount Lemmon Survey	(5)	970 m	MPC; JPL
603394	2015 CD_{50}	—	February 28, 2008	Kitt Peak	Spacewatch	·	1.0 km	MPC; JPL
603395	2015 CY_{51}	—	January 25, 2015	Haleakala	Pan-STARRS 1	·	1.3 km	MPC; JPL
603396	2015 CB_{54}	—	March 14, 2011	Kitt Peak	Spacewatch	MAR	900 m	MPC; JPL
603397	2015 CP_{55}	—	August 11, 2012	Siding Spring	SSS	·	1.2 km	MPC; JPL
603398	2015 CW_{55}	—	February 23, 2007	Mount Lemmon	Mount Lemmon Survey	T_{j} (2.97) · 3:2	4.7 km	MPC; JPL
603399	2015 CU_{57}	—	April 6, 2008	Mount Lemmon	Mount Lemmon Survey	·	740 m	MPC; JPL
603400	2015 CM_{59}	—	August 21, 2006	Kitt Peak	Spacewatch	·	880 m	MPC; JPL

== 603401–603500 ==
back to top

Designation			Discovery			Properties		Ref
Permanent	Provisional	Named after	Date	Site	Discoverer(s)	Category	Diam.	Ref
603401	2015 CE_{60}	—	November 19, 2009	Kitt Peak	Spacewatch	H	780 m	MPC; JPL
603402	2015 CQ_{60}	—	February 29, 2008	Kitt Peak	Spacewatch	·	1 km	MPC; JPL
603403	2015 CU_{62}	—	February 10, 2015	Mount Lemmon	Mount Lemmon Survey	MAS	600 m	MPC; JPL
603404	2015 CU_{65}	—	April 21, 2009	Mount Lemmon	Mount Lemmon Survey	·	700 m	MPC; JPL
603405	2015 CZ_{69}	—	January 22, 2015	Haleakala	Pan-STARRS 1	V	410 m	MPC; JPL
603406	2015 CB_{74}	—	February 11, 2015	Mount Lemmon	Mount Lemmon Survey	·	2.2 km	MPC; JPL
603407	2015 DA	—	June 8, 2011	Nogales	M. Schwartz, P. R. Holvorcem	·	1.9 km	MPC; JPL
603408	2015 DJ	—	January 26, 1998	Kitt Peak	Spacewatch	·	1.3 km	MPC; JPL
603409	2015 DJ_{6}	—	August 19, 2006	Kitt Peak	Spacewatch	·	1.0 km	MPC; JPL
603410	2015 DE_{7}	—	January 16, 2015	Haleakala	Pan-STARRS 1	·	2.5 km	MPC; JPL
603411	2015 DJ_{10}	—	February 28, 2008	Kitt Peak	Spacewatch	·	680 m	MPC; JPL
603412	2015 DK_{12}	—	November 8, 2010	Mount Lemmon	Mount Lemmon Survey	·	740 m	MPC; JPL
603413	2015 DK_{13}	—	January 8, 2006	Mount Lemmon	Mount Lemmon Survey	NEM	2.3 km	MPC; JPL
603414	2015 DS_{14}	—	May 14, 2008	Mount Lemmon	Mount Lemmon Survey	·	1.3 km	MPC; JPL
603415	2015 DU_{22}	—	January 27, 2015	Haleakala	Pan-STARRS 1	·	1.6 km	MPC; JPL
603416	2015 DK_{23}	—	September 4, 2008	Kitt Peak	Spacewatch	HOF	2.3 km	MPC; JPL
603417	2015 DP_{23}	—	March 11, 2007	Kitt Peak	Spacewatch	·	950 m	MPC; JPL
603418	2015 DC_{26}	—	November 4, 2005	Mount Lemmon	Mount Lemmon Survey	·	1.1 km	MPC; JPL
603419	2015 DB_{30}	—	January 29, 2015	Haleakala	Pan-STARRS 1	·	2.6 km	MPC; JPL
603420	2015 DF_{31}	—	April 29, 2003	Kitt Peak	Spacewatch	·	1.3 km	MPC; JPL
603421	2015 DS_{32}	—	September 26, 2006	Catalina	CSS	·	830 m	MPC; JPL
603422	2015 DV_{34}	—	December 13, 2006	Kitt Peak	Spacewatch	·	740 m	MPC; JPL
603423	2015 DC_{39}	—	September 11, 2010	Kitt Peak	Spacewatch	·	680 m	MPC; JPL
603424	2015 DF_{39}	—	March 6, 2008	Mount Lemmon	Mount Lemmon Survey	·	780 m	MPC; JPL
603425	2015 DB_{40}	—	October 17, 2009	Mount Lemmon	Mount Lemmon Survey	·	790 m	MPC; JPL
603426	2015 DE_{46}	—	June 21, 2012	Kitt Peak	Spacewatch	·	1.2 km	MPC; JPL
603427	2015 DA_{47}	—	October 20, 2006	Kitt Peak	Deep Ecliptic Survey	·	1.2 km	MPC; JPL
603428	2015 DN_{49}	—	February 16, 2015	Haleakala	Pan-STARRS 1	·	990 m	MPC; JPL
603429	2015 DZ_{49}	—	October 16, 2009	Mount Lemmon	Mount Lemmon Survey	·	740 m	MPC; JPL
603430	2015 DF_{51}	—	July 20, 2012	Siding Spring	SSS	·	1.6 km	MPC; JPL
603431	2015 DR_{52}	—	October 8, 2008	Mount Lemmon	Mount Lemmon Survey	·	2.0 km	MPC; JPL
603432	2015 DN_{56}	—	August 26, 2003	Cerro Tololo	Deep Ecliptic Survey	·	610 m	MPC; JPL
603433	2015 DU_{58}	—	January 20, 2015	Haleakala	Pan-STARRS 1	·	830 m	MPC; JPL
603434	2015 DJ_{62}	—	September 10, 2007	Mount Lemmon	Mount Lemmon Survey	·	1.7 km	MPC; JPL
603435	2015 DF_{63}	—	March 13, 2011	Kitt Peak	Spacewatch	·	1.3 km	MPC; JPL
603436	2015 DB_{68}	—	March 23, 2003	Apache Point	SDSS Collaboration	·	1.2 km	MPC; JPL
603437	2015 DX_{68}	—	April 28, 2012	Mount Lemmon	Mount Lemmon Survey	·	580 m	MPC; JPL
603438	2015 DZ_{68}	—	January 22, 2015	Haleakala	Pan-STARRS 1	KOR	1.1 km	MPC; JPL
603439	2015 DN_{69}	—	May 15, 2012	Haleakala	Pan-STARRS 1	·	610 m	MPC; JPL
603440	2015 DH_{70}	—	February 25, 2011	Mount Lemmon	Mount Lemmon Survey	·	630 m	MPC; JPL
603441	2015 DO_{71}	—	February 25, 2007	Kitt Peak	Spacewatch	·	600 m	MPC; JPL
603442	2015 DS_{72}	—	October 12, 2007	Mount Lemmon	Mount Lemmon Survey	·	2.6 km	MPC; JPL
603443	2015 DN_{73}	—	September 19, 2001	Socorro	LINEAR	·	2.5 km	MPC; JPL
603444	2015 DC_{75}	—	February 16, 2015	Haleakala	Pan-STARRS 1	·	1.4 km	MPC; JPL
603445	2015 DE_{77}	—	March 4, 2011	Kitt Peak	Spacewatch	·	920 m	MPC; JPL
603446	2015 DN_{78}	—	March 10, 2011	Kitt Peak	Spacewatch	·	1.2 km	MPC; JPL
603447	2015 DC_{81}	—	July 4, 2005	Palomar	NEAT	·	1.3 km	MPC; JPL
603448	2015 DK_{84}	—	September 3, 2008	Kitt Peak	Spacewatch	·	1.1 km	MPC; JPL
603449	2015 DT_{84}	—	October 23, 2006	Mount Lemmon	Mount Lemmon Survey	CLA	1.3 km	MPC; JPL
603450	2015 DZ_{84}	—	July 8, 2005	Kitt Peak	Spacewatch	·	1.0 km	MPC; JPL
603451	2015 DH_{85}	—	January 28, 2007	Mount Lemmon	Mount Lemmon Survey	·	910 m	MPC; JPL
603452	2015 DL_{92}	—	November 22, 2006	Mount Lemmon	Mount Lemmon Survey	NYS	910 m	MPC; JPL
603453	2015 DV_{92}	—	February 13, 2004	Kitt Peak	Spacewatch	·	1.0 km	MPC; JPL
603454	2015 DN_{93}	—	April 2, 2009	Kitt Peak	Spacewatch	·	490 m	MPC; JPL
603455	2015 DE_{96}	—	February 8, 2011	Mount Lemmon	Mount Lemmon Survey	NYS	830 m	MPC; JPL
603456	2015 DR_{97}	—	March 17, 2007	Kitt Peak	Spacewatch	·	1.1 km	MPC; JPL
603457	2015 DB_{101}	—	August 23, 2006	Palomar	NEAT	·	900 m	MPC; JPL
603458	2015 DC_{102}	—	November 25, 2009	Kitt Peak	Spacewatch	·	1.5 km	MPC; JPL
603459	2015 DP_{108}	—	January 27, 2015	Haleakala	Pan-STARRS 1	KRM	1.9 km	MPC; JPL
603460	2015 DU_{112}	—	January 23, 2015	Haleakala	Pan-STARRS 1	·	1.1 km	MPC; JPL
603461	2015 DX_{116}	—	November 2, 2010	Mount Lemmon	Mount Lemmon Survey	V	540 m	MPC; JPL
603462	2015 DS_{118}	—	August 27, 2006	Lulin	LUSS	·	1.2 km	MPC; JPL
603463	2015 DQ_{120}	—	January 19, 2015	Haleakala	Pan-STARRS 1	·	910 m	MPC; JPL
603464	2015 DO_{121}	—	February 17, 2015	Haleakala	Pan-STARRS 1	·	1.0 km	MPC; JPL
603465	2015 DD_{124}	—	November 22, 2006	Mount Lemmon	Mount Lemmon Survey	·	780 m	MPC; JPL
603466	2015 DK_{124}	—	January 30, 2011	Mount Lemmon	Mount Lemmon Survey	·	1.5 km	MPC; JPL
603467	2015 DR_{125}	—	May 10, 2007	Mount Lemmon	Mount Lemmon Survey	ADE	1.9 km	MPC; JPL
603468	2015 DZ_{125}	—	April 8, 2003	Haleakala	NEAT	MAR	1.4 km	MPC; JPL
603469	2015 DQ_{126}	—	January 23, 2006	Kitt Peak	Spacewatch	·	1.8 km	MPC; JPL
603470	2015 DO_{127}	—	August 17, 2012	Haleakala	Pan-STARRS 1	T_{j} (2.99) · (895)	2.6 km	MPC; JPL
603471	2015 DD_{130}	—	March 26, 2011	Haleakala	Pan-STARRS 1	·	1.1 km	MPC; JPL
603472	2015 DY_{130}	—	November 17, 2009	Mount Lemmon	Mount Lemmon Survey	526	2.0 km	MPC; JPL
603473	2015 DM_{133}	—	February 17, 2015	Haleakala	Pan-STARRS 1	·	1.4 km	MPC; JPL
603474	2015 DQ_{134}	—	February 17, 2015	Haleakala	Pan-STARRS 1	·	2.8 km	MPC; JPL
603475	2015 DD_{138}	—	February 17, 2015	Haleakala	Pan-STARRS 1	PHO	1.1 km	MPC; JPL
603476	2015 DQ_{138}	—	February 17, 2015	Haleakala	Pan-STARRS 1	·	1.8 km	MPC; JPL
603477	2015 DO_{145}	—	December 26, 2014	Haleakala	Pan-STARRS 1	·	670 m	MPC; JPL
603478	2015 DE_{148}	—	March 1, 2012	Mount Lemmon	Mount Lemmon Survey	·	710 m	MPC; JPL
603479	2015 DB_{150}	—	February 8, 2008	Kitt Peak	Spacewatch	·	700 m	MPC; JPL
603480	2015 DR_{152}	—	January 21, 2015	Haleakala	Pan-STARRS 1	·	1.8 km	MPC; JPL
603481	2015 DJ_{154}	—	January 10, 2006	Mount Lemmon	Mount Lemmon Survey	·	2.0 km	MPC; JPL
603482	2015 DY_{157}	—	March 31, 2011	Mount Lemmon	Mount Lemmon Survey	·	1.7 km	MPC; JPL
603483	2015 DE_{158}	—	March 26, 2011	Kitt Peak	Spacewatch	·	1.5 km	MPC; JPL
603484	2015 DO_{158}	—	January 26, 2015	Haleakala	Pan-STARRS 1	MAR	920 m	MPC; JPL
603485	2015 DP_{158}	—	January 24, 2015	Haleakala	Pan-STARRS 1	JUN	1.0 km	MPC; JPL
603486	2015 DN_{160}	—	December 6, 2010	Mount Lemmon	Mount Lemmon Survey	·	710 m	MPC; JPL
603487	2015 DL_{161}	—	November 3, 2007	Mount Lemmon	Mount Lemmon Survey	·	2.6 km	MPC; JPL
603488	2015 DE_{162}	—	February 25, 2011	Mount Lemmon	Mount Lemmon Survey	NYS	1.0 km	MPC; JPL
603489	2015 DP_{164}	—	August 13, 2012	Haleakala	Pan-STARRS 1	·	1.3 km	MPC; JPL
603490	2015 DH_{165}	—	January 21, 2015	Haleakala	Pan-STARRS 1	·	1.0 km	MPC; JPL
603491	2015 DP_{166}	—	November 10, 2010	Mount Lemmon	Mount Lemmon Survey	L4	8.3 km	MPC; JPL
603492	2015 DG_{168}	—	August 24, 2008	Kitt Peak	Spacewatch	MRX	1.1 km	MPC; JPL
603493	2015 DB_{170}	—	December 20, 2014	Haleakala	Pan-STARRS 1	PHO	800 m	MPC; JPL
603494	2015 DB_{171}	—	January 21, 2015	Haleakala	Pan-STARRS 1	·	1.0 km	MPC; JPL
603495	2015 DG_{173}	—	January 21, 2015	Haleakala	Pan-STARRS 1	·	1.1 km	MPC; JPL
603496	2015 DJ_{178}	—	January 18, 2015	Haleakala	Pan-STARRS 1	·	1.3 km	MPC; JPL
603497	2015 DV_{181}	—	March 26, 2007	Mount Lemmon	Mount Lemmon Survey	·	1.1 km	MPC; JPL
603498	2015 DX_{185}	—	October 11, 2004	Kitt Peak	Spacewatch	GEF	1.3 km	MPC; JPL
603499	2015 DE_{192}	—	January 8, 2011	Mount Lemmon	Mount Lemmon Survey	·	1.1 km	MPC; JPL
603500	2015 DA_{196}	—	February 22, 2015	Haleakala	Pan-STARRS 1	·	980 m	MPC; JPL

== 603501–603600 ==
back to top

Designation			Discovery			Properties		Ref
Permanent	Provisional	Named after	Date	Site	Discoverer(s)	Category	Diam.	Ref
603501	2015 DM_{196}	—	November 20, 2008	Kitt Peak	Spacewatch	EOS	1.5 km	MPC; JPL
603502	2015 DF_{197}	—	January 23, 2015	Haleakala	Pan-STARRS 1	·	2.8 km	MPC; JPL
603503	2015 DU_{204}	—	February 23, 2015	Haleakala	Pan-STARRS 1	GAL	1.2 km	MPC; JPL
603504	2015 DC_{207}	—	September 23, 2008	Mount Lemmon	Mount Lemmon Survey	BRG	1.4 km	MPC; JPL
603505	2015 DE_{208}	—	December 11, 2013	Haleakala	Pan-STARRS 1	DOR	1.9 km	MPC; JPL
603506	2015 DB_{209}	—	February 23, 2015	Haleakala	Pan-STARRS 1	·	1.0 km	MPC; JPL
603507	2015 DG_{209}	—	November 29, 2005	Palomar	NEAT	·	1.1 km	MPC; JPL
603508	2015 DM_{209}	—	February 23, 2015	Haleakala	Pan-STARRS 1	H	410 m	MPC; JPL
603509	2015 DF_{211}	—	November 25, 2009	Kitt Peak	Spacewatch	·	1.3 km	MPC; JPL
603510	2015 DW_{211}	—	January 30, 2015	Haleakala	Pan-STARRS 1	·	1.1 km	MPC; JPL
603511	2015 DD_{212}	—	October 23, 2001	Palomar	NEAT	V	710 m	MPC; JPL
603512	2015 DQ_{213}	—	January 28, 2015	Haleakala	Pan-STARRS 1	·	1.4 km	MPC; JPL
603513	2015 DW_{213}	—	January 30, 2011	Haleakala	Pan-STARRS 1	·	710 m	MPC; JPL
603514	2015 DZ_{214}	—	April 2, 2005	Mount Lemmon	Mount Lemmon Survey	·	470 m	MPC; JPL
603515	2015 DV_{219}	—	February 12, 2002	Socorro	LINEAR	·	1.6 km	MPC; JPL
603516	2015 DZ_{224}	—	February 17, 2015	Haleakala	Pan-STARRS 1	L4	8.9 km	MPC; JPL
603517	2015 DD_{230}	—	September 15, 2007	Kitt Peak	Spacewatch	·	1.8 km	MPC; JPL
603518	2015 DZ_{232}	—	February 12, 2011	Mount Lemmon	Mount Lemmon Survey	V	490 m	MPC; JPL
603519	2015 DV_{234}	—	February 16, 2005	La Silla	A. Boattini	KOR	1.3 km	MPC; JPL
603520	2015 DM_{237}	—	February 10, 2011	Mount Lemmon	Mount Lemmon Survey	PHO	690 m	MPC; JPL
603521	2015 DU_{243}	—	January 28, 2015	Haleakala	Pan-STARRS 1	MAR	840 m	MPC; JPL
603522	2015 DN_{250}	—	November 16, 2010	Mount Lemmon	Mount Lemmon Survey	·	690 m	MPC; JPL
603523	2015 DJ_{259}	—	February 23, 2015	Haleakala	Pan-STARRS 1	H	410 m	MPC; JPL
603524	2015 DZ_{264}	—	February 18, 2015	XuYi	PMO NEO Survey Program	HNS	1.2 km	MPC; JPL
603525	2015 DL_{265}	—	February 16, 2015	Haleakala	Pan-STARRS 1	·	1.4 km	MPC; JPL
603526	2015 DF_{269}	—	October 11, 2012	Haleakala	Pan-STARRS 1	·	1.2 km	MPC; JPL
603527	2015 DM_{269}	—	February 16, 2015	Haleakala	Pan-STARRS 1	·	1.5 km	MPC; JPL
603528	2015 DW_{270}	—	February 20, 2015	Haleakala	Pan-STARRS 1	·	1.3 km	MPC; JPL
603529	2015 DX_{270}	—	February 16, 2015	Haleakala	Pan-STARRS 1	·	980 m	MPC; JPL
603530	2015 DX_{280}	—	February 18, 2015	Kitt Peak	Research and Education Collaborative Occultation Network	·	1.4 km	MPC; JPL
603531	2015 DM_{292}	—	February 14, 2010	Mount Lemmon	Mount Lemmon Survey	·	1.7 km	MPC; JPL
603532	2015 DP_{294}	—	February 17, 2015	Haleakala	Pan-STARRS 1	·	2.1 km	MPC; JPL
603533	2015 ES_{1}	—	March 28, 2011	Mount Lemmon	Mount Lemmon Survey	·	950 m	MPC; JPL
603534	2015 EH_{5}	—	May 22, 2003	Kitt Peak	Spacewatch	·	1.4 km	MPC; JPL
603535	2015 EH_{7}	—	January 21, 2015	Haleakala	Pan-STARRS 1	H	520 m	MPC; JPL
603536	2015 EX_{7}	—	January 29, 2015	Haleakala	Pan-STARRS 1	·	1.1 km	MPC; JPL
603537	2015 EB_{8}	—	January 21, 2015	Haleakala	Pan-STARRS 1	·	1.5 km	MPC; JPL
603538	2015 EQ_{10}	—	November 8, 2010	Mount Lemmon	Mount Lemmon Survey	·	800 m	MPC; JPL
603539	2015 ES_{10}	—	September 17, 2006	Kitt Peak	Spacewatch	·	890 m	MPC; JPL
603540	2015 EW_{13}	—	March 7, 2003	Needville	J. Dellinger, Dillon, W. G.	·	720 m	MPC; JPL
603541	2015 ER_{24}	—	December 11, 2006	Kitt Peak	Spacewatch	·	1.2 km	MPC; JPL
603542	2015 ER_{29}	—	May 5, 2003	Kitt Peak	Spacewatch	·	1.2 km	MPC; JPL
603543	2015 EC_{35}	—	March 26, 2003	Kitt Peak	Spacewatch	·	810 m	MPC; JPL
603544	2015 EX_{35}	—	May 12, 2012	Mount Lemmon	Mount Lemmon Survey	·	550 m	MPC; JPL
603545	2015 EN_{49}	—	February 11, 2015	Mount Lemmon	Mount Lemmon Survey	·	1.8 km	MPC; JPL
603546	2015 EC_{57}	—	March 14, 2015	Haleakala	Pan-STARRS 1	HNS	910 m	MPC; JPL
603547	2015 EH_{57}	—	April 27, 2011	Mount Lemmon	Mount Lemmon Survey	·	1.3 km	MPC; JPL
603548	2015 EX_{57}	—	February 17, 2015	Haleakala	Pan-STARRS 1	·	2.1 km	MPC; JPL
603549	2015 EN_{63}	—	January 28, 2007	Catalina	CSS	·	1.2 km	MPC; JPL
603550	2015 EY_{64}	—	March 6, 2002	Socorro	LINEAR	·	1.8 km	MPC; JPL
603551	2015 EN_{66}	—	January 22, 2015	Haleakala	Pan-STARRS 1	NYS	820 m	MPC; JPL
603552	2015 EY_{67}	—	March 28, 2012	Kitt Peak	Spacewatch	·	540 m	MPC; JPL
603553	2015 ET_{68}	—	March 28, 2008	Mount Lemmon	Mount Lemmon Survey	NYS	840 m	MPC; JPL
603554	2015 EJ_{73}	—	September 4, 2008	Kitt Peak	Spacewatch	·	1.5 km	MPC; JPL
603555	2015 EK_{74}	—	October 20, 2003	Kitt Peak	Spacewatch	H	400 m	MPC; JPL
603556	2015 ER_{74}	—	March 15, 2015	Haleakala	Pan-STARRS 1	H	420 m	MPC; JPL
603557	2015 EF_{76}	—	March 10, 2015	Mount Lemmon	Mount Lemmon Survey	·	2.7 km	MPC; JPL
603558	2015 FA	—	March 16, 2015	Catalina	CSS	H	590 m	MPC; JPL
603559	2015 FB_{5}	—	October 26, 2009	Kitt Peak	Spacewatch	·	1.6 km	MPC; JPL
603560	2015 FV_{15}	—	October 30, 2013	Haleakala	Pan-STARRS 1	PHO	1 km	MPC; JPL
603561	2015 FD_{19}	—	April 11, 2002	Palomar	NEAT	·	1.6 km	MPC; JPL
603562 Vadimsouley	2015 FR_{21}	Vadimsouley	December 15, 2009	Saint-Sulpice	B. Christophe	·	1.6 km	MPC; JPL
603563	2015 FB_{24}	—	February 18, 2015	Haleakala	Pan-STARRS 1	ADE	1.5 km	MPC; JPL
603564	2015 FK_{24}	—	November 9, 2013	Haleakala	Pan-STARRS 1	MAR	1.0 km	MPC; JPL
603565	2015 FE_{27}	—	August 12, 2013	Haleakala	Pan-STARRS 1	EUN	1.2 km	MPC; JPL
603566	2015 FM_{39}	—	October 29, 2008	Mount Lemmon	Mount Lemmon Survey	·	1.4 km	MPC; JPL
603567	2015 FV_{39}	—	March 29, 2011	Mount Lemmon	Mount Lemmon Survey	·	870 m	MPC; JPL
603568	2015 FO_{41}	—	March 2, 2011	Kitt Peak	Spacewatch	·	860 m	MPC; JPL
603569	2015 FJ_{42}	—	May 23, 2011	Mount Lemmon	Mount Lemmon Survey	·	950 m	MPC; JPL
603570	2015 FY_{42}	—	October 8, 2005	Kitt Peak	Spacewatch	H	330 m	MPC; JPL
603571	2015 FJ_{47}	—	March 10, 2007	Mount Lemmon	Mount Lemmon Survey	·	1.2 km	MPC; JPL
603572	2015 FO_{48}	—	March 4, 2005	Mount Lemmon	Mount Lemmon Survey	·	720 m	MPC; JPL
603573	2015 FV_{51}	—	March 30, 2008	Kitt Peak	Spacewatch	·	1.1 km	MPC; JPL
603574	2015 FZ_{51}	—	March 16, 2004	Kitt Peak	Spacewatch	·	1.1 km	MPC; JPL
603575	2015 FL_{53}	—	October 29, 2010	Mount Lemmon	Mount Lemmon Survey	·	900 m	MPC; JPL
603576	2015 FR_{54}	—	November 30, 2014	Haleakala	Pan-STARRS 1	·	1.5 km	MPC; JPL
603577	2015 FN_{57}	—	January 18, 2015	Haleakala	Pan-STARRS 1	·	1.1 km	MPC; JPL
603578	2015 FV_{63}	—	January 31, 2015	Haleakala	Pan-STARRS 1	·	1.8 km	MPC; JPL
603579	2015 FL_{65}	—	January 28, 2015	Haleakala	Pan-STARRS 1	MAR	740 m	MPC; JPL
603580	2015 FE_{70}	—	December 29, 2011	Mount Lemmon	Mount Lemmon Survey	L4	8.6 km	MPC; JPL
603581	2015 FF_{71}	—	April 15, 2008	Mount Lemmon	Mount Lemmon Survey	·	790 m	MPC; JPL
603582	2015 FT_{72}	—	May 25, 2011	Mount Lemmon	Mount Lemmon Survey	·	830 m	MPC; JPL
603583	2015 FL_{73}	—	March 13, 2011	Mount Lemmon	Mount Lemmon Survey	·	1.1 km	MPC; JPL
603584	2015 FJ_{74}	—	October 2, 2008	Mount Lemmon	Mount Lemmon Survey	L4 · ERY	7.6 km	MPC; JPL
603585	2015 FE_{75}	—	May 11, 2007	Mount Lemmon	Mount Lemmon Survey	·	1.3 km	MPC; JPL
603586	2015 FW_{75}	—	May 7, 2002	Anderson Mesa	LONEOS	·	1.7 km	MPC; JPL
603587	2015 FX_{75}	—	March 18, 2015	Haleakala	Pan-STARRS 1	·	1.7 km	MPC; JPL
603588	2015 FD_{78}	—	December 28, 2011	Mount Lemmon	Mount Lemmon Survey	L4	7.6 km	MPC; JPL
603589	2015 FJ_{78}	—	October 24, 2013	Mount Lemmon	Mount Lemmon Survey	·	750 m	MPC; JPL
603590	2015 FN_{78}	—	September 30, 2006	Mount Lemmon	Mount Lemmon Survey	·	3.0 km	MPC; JPL
603591	2015 FV_{79}	—	April 23, 2007	Kitt Peak	Spacewatch	H	470 m	MPC; JPL
603592	2015 FE_{81}	—	November 18, 2008	Kitt Peak	Spacewatch	·	1.5 km	MPC; JPL
603593	2015 FJ_{84}	—	April 1, 2011	Kitt Peak	Spacewatch	·	1.6 km	MPC; JPL
603594	2015 FV_{90}	—	August 26, 2012	Kitt Peak	Spacewatch	·	2.2 km	MPC; JPL
603595	2015 FH_{94}	—	May 10, 2007	Mount Lemmon	Mount Lemmon Survey	·	1.3 km	MPC; JPL
603596	2015 FX_{95}	—	October 26, 2009	Mount Lemmon	Mount Lemmon Survey	·	840 m	MPC; JPL
603597	2015 FM_{102}	—	December 31, 2013	Kitt Peak	Spacewatch	·	2.3 km	MPC; JPL
603598	2015 FW_{102}	—	October 8, 2012	Haleakala	Pan-STARRS 1	·	1.7 km	MPC; JPL
603599	2015 FD_{107}	—	September 16, 2004	Kitt Peak	Spacewatch	·	870 m	MPC; JPL
603600	2015 FE_{112}	—	January 23, 2015	Haleakala	Pan-STARRS 1	·	1.2 km	MPC; JPL

== 603601–603700 ==
back to top

Designation			Discovery			Properties		Ref
Permanent	Provisional	Named after	Date	Site	Discoverer(s)	Category	Diam.	Ref
603601	2015 FM_{114}	—	November 2, 2007	Kitt Peak	Spacewatch	EOS	1.5 km	MPC; JPL
603602	2015 FA_{115}	—	July 28, 2011	Andrushivka	Kyrylenko, P.	·	1.7 km	MPC; JPL
603603	2015 FR_{115}	—	October 6, 2008	Mount Lemmon	Mount Lemmon Survey	·	1.5 km	MPC; JPL
603604	2015 FS_{115}	—	January 30, 2011	Haleakala	Pan-STARRS 1	·	1.1 km	MPC; JPL
603605	2015 FE_{116}	—	September 9, 2008	Mount Lemmon	Mount Lemmon Survey	·	1.2 km	MPC; JPL
603606	2015 FR_{118}	—	August 3, 2008	Siding Spring	SSS	H	540 m	MPC; JPL
603607	2015 FB_{119}	—	March 16, 2005	Catalina	CSS	·	2.1 km	MPC; JPL
603608	2015 FC_{119}	—	April 19, 2004	Kitt Peak	Spacewatch	·	1.4 km	MPC; JPL
603609	2015 FG_{119}	—	March 18, 2005	Catalina	CSS	·	2.0 km	MPC; JPL
603610	2015 FY_{119}	—	November 15, 2006	Catalina	CSS	·	1.3 km	MPC; JPL
603611	2015 FJ_{122}	—	March 31, 2008	Kitt Peak	Spacewatch	·	860 m	MPC; JPL
603612	2015 FO_{123}	—	January 17, 2004	Palomar	NEAT	EOS	2.2 km	MPC; JPL
603613	2015 FR_{127}	—	March 11, 2007	Mount Lemmon	Mount Lemmon Survey	·	910 m	MPC; JPL
603614	2015 FZ_{134}	—	March 6, 2011	Kitt Peak	Spacewatch	·	1.2 km	MPC; JPL
603615	2015 FF_{135}	—	April 5, 2005	Mount Lemmon	Mount Lemmon Survey	·	1.4 km	MPC; JPL
603616	2015 FX_{137}	—	April 21, 2004	Campo Imperatore	CINEOS	MAS	640 m	MPC; JPL
603617	2015 FJ_{139}	—	October 22, 2009	Mount Lemmon	Mount Lemmon Survey	L4	7.1 km	MPC; JPL
603618	2015 FP_{141}	—	August 25, 2012	Kitt Peak	Spacewatch	MAS	630 m	MPC; JPL
603619	2015 FS_{145}	—	December 22, 2005	Kitt Peak	Spacewatch	·	1.1 km	MPC; JPL
603620	2015 FS_{146}	—	January 10, 2013	Haleakala	Pan-STARRS 1	L4	7.4 km	MPC; JPL
603621	2015 FK_{148}	—	January 23, 2015	Haleakala	Pan-STARRS 1	·	960 m	MPC; JPL
603622	2015 FL_{149}	—	April 21, 2011	Haleakala	Pan-STARRS 1	·	830 m	MPC; JPL
603623	2015 FO_{151}	—	March 21, 2015	Haleakala	Pan-STARRS 1	·	1.6 km	MPC; JPL
603624	2015 FR_{151}	—	August 9, 2011	Piszkés-tető	K. Sárneczky, A. Pál	·	1.3 km	MPC; JPL
603625	2015 FX_{152}	—	April 20, 2007	Mount Lemmon	Mount Lemmon Survey	·	1.2 km	MPC; JPL
603626	2015 FL_{154}	—	September 5, 2008	Kitt Peak	Spacewatch	·	1.3 km	MPC; JPL
603627	2015 FN_{155}	—	January 23, 2015	Haleakala	Pan-STARRS 1	·	1.3 km	MPC; JPL
603628	2015 FW_{155}	—	March 21, 2015	Haleakala	Pan-STARRS 1	L4	7.2 km	MPC; JPL
603629	2015 FZ_{155}	—	November 11, 2010	Mount Lemmon	Mount Lemmon Survey	L4	6.9 km	MPC; JPL
603630	2015 FC_{159}	—	August 21, 2004	Siding Spring	SSS	EUN	1.3 km	MPC; JPL
603631	2015 FM_{162}	—	December 1, 2010	Mount Lemmon	Mount Lemmon Survey	L4	7.7 km	MPC; JPL
603632	2015 FB_{165}	—	October 11, 2012	Mount Lemmon	Mount Lemmon Survey	·	1.2 km	MPC; JPL
603633	2015 FO_{165}	—	April 30, 2011	Kitt Peak	Spacewatch	·	1.1 km	MPC; JPL
603634	2015 FA_{167}	—	November 22, 2005	Kitt Peak	Spacewatch	·	1.2 km	MPC; JPL
603635	2015 FH_{167}	—	April 25, 2004	Kitt Peak	Spacewatch	L4	7.0 km	MPC; JPL
603636	2015 FP_{169}	—	January 10, 2013	Haleakala	Pan-STARRS 1	L4	6.8 km	MPC; JPL
603637	2015 FY_{173}	—	January 1, 2009	Kitt Peak	Spacewatch	EOS	1.7 km	MPC; JPL
603638	2015 FE_{174}	—	December 13, 2013	Nogales	M. Schwartz, P. R. Holvorcem	·	2.1 km	MPC; JPL
603639	2015 FM_{176}	—	March 21, 2015	Haleakala	Pan-STARRS 1	·	1.1 km	MPC; JPL
603640	2015 FY_{176}	—	January 23, 2015	Haleakala	Pan-STARRS 1	·	1.4 km	MPC; JPL
603641	2015 FH_{178}	—	October 18, 2012	Haleakala	Pan-STARRS 1	AEO	1.0 km	MPC; JPL
603642	2015 FV_{179}	—	February 16, 2015	Haleakala	Pan-STARRS 1	·	1.0 km	MPC; JPL
603643	2015 FX_{179}	—	April 14, 2004	Kitt Peak	Spacewatch	·	960 m	MPC; JPL
603644	2015 FL_{180}	—	January 6, 2010	Mount Lemmon	Mount Lemmon Survey	·	1.2 km	MPC; JPL
603645	2015 FA_{186}	—	November 17, 2009	Mount Lemmon	Mount Lemmon Survey	·	1.6 km	MPC; JPL
603646	2015 FK_{187}	—	March 22, 2015	Haleakala	Pan-STARRS 1	·	1.5 km	MPC; JPL
603647	2015 FP_{188}	—	January 10, 2011	Kitt Peak	Spacewatch	·	1.3 km	MPC; JPL
603648	2015 FR_{191}	—	March 2, 2011	Mount Lemmon	Mount Lemmon Survey	HNS	1.0 km	MPC; JPL
603649	2015 FE_{194}	—	January 12, 2011	Mount Lemmon	Mount Lemmon Survey	V	660 m	MPC; JPL
603650	2015 FB_{197}	—	February 22, 2015	Haleakala	Pan-STARRS 1	PHO	810 m	MPC; JPL
603651	2015 FJ_{197}	—	February 23, 2015	Haleakala	Pan-STARRS 1	V	520 m	MPC; JPL
603652	2015 FC_{198}	—	January 23, 2015	Haleakala	Pan-STARRS 1	·	840 m	MPC; JPL
603653	2015 FP_{199}	—	August 17, 2009	Kitt Peak	Spacewatch	V	640 m	MPC; JPL
603654	2015 FE_{200}	—	March 15, 2008	Kitt Peak	Spacewatch	V	610 m	MPC; JPL
603655	2015 FB_{201}	—	March 20, 2007	Kitt Peak	Spacewatch	·	850 m	MPC; JPL
603656	2015 FU_{202}	—	November 13, 2007	Mount Lemmon	Mount Lemmon Survey	·	2.9 km	MPC; JPL
603657	2015 FU_{204}	—	June 5, 2011	Mount Lemmon	Mount Lemmon Survey	·	1.4 km	MPC; JPL
603658	2015 FH_{205}	—	January 22, 2015	Haleakala	Pan-STARRS 1	·	1.3 km	MPC; JPL
603659	2015 FF_{207}	—	February 16, 2015	Haleakala	Pan-STARRS 1	·	700 m	MPC; JPL
603660	2015 FF_{208}	—	April 7, 2007	Mount Lemmon	Mount Lemmon Survey	·	640 m	MPC; JPL
603661	2015 FV_{213}	—	May 22, 2011	Kitt Peak	Spacewatch	EUN	930 m	MPC; JPL
603662	2015 FW_{215}	—	September 17, 2013	Mount Lemmon	Mount Lemmon Survey	·	830 m	MPC; JPL
603663	2015 FS_{217}	—	September 25, 2009	Kitt Peak	Spacewatch	L4	6.3 km	MPC; JPL
603664	2015 FQ_{218}	—	December 10, 2013	Mount Lemmon	Mount Lemmon Survey	·	1.2 km	MPC; JPL
603665	2015 FH_{220}	—	May 1, 2003	Kitt Peak	Spacewatch	·	1.2 km	MPC; JPL
603666	2015 FB_{224}	—	January 11, 2010	Kitt Peak	Spacewatch	·	2.2 km	MPC; JPL
603667	2015 FA_{226}	—	May 22, 2011	Mount Lemmon	Mount Lemmon Survey	·	1.4 km	MPC; JPL
603668	2015 FY_{228}	—	April 9, 2008	Kitt Peak	Spacewatch	MAS	670 m	MPC; JPL
603669	2015 FM_{237}	—	March 23, 2015	Haleakala	Pan-STARRS 1	PHO	720 m	MPC; JPL
603670	2015 FA_{240}	—	February 7, 2011	Mount Lemmon	Mount Lemmon Survey	·	840 m	MPC; JPL
603671	2015 FJ_{240}	—	April 27, 2012	Haleakala	Pan-STARRS 1	·	590 m	MPC; JPL
603672	2015 FS_{242}	—	June 4, 2011	Mount Lemmon	Mount Lemmon Survey	·	1.5 km	MPC; JPL
603673	2015 FY_{243}	—	March 23, 2015	Haleakala	Pan-STARRS 1	(2076)	710 m	MPC; JPL
603674	2015 FQ_{244}	—	March 23, 2015	Haleakala	Pan-STARRS 1	·	970 m	MPC; JPL
603675	2015 FK_{245}	—	November 10, 2013	Kitt Peak	Spacewatch	·	1.0 km	MPC; JPL
603676	2015 FS_{257}	—	January 26, 2011	Mount Lemmon	Mount Lemmon Survey	·	940 m	MPC; JPL
603677	2015 FE_{261}	—	April 3, 2008	Mount Lemmon	Mount Lemmon Survey	NYS	1.2 km	MPC; JPL
603678	2015 FJ_{261}	—	March 13, 2011	Kitt Peak	Spacewatch	·	1.5 km	MPC; JPL
603679	2015 FW_{263}	—	April 24, 2008	Mount Lemmon	Mount Lemmon Survey	·	1.2 km	MPC; JPL
603680	2015 FC_{264}	—	January 24, 2011	Mount Lemmon	Mount Lemmon Survey	·	1.3 km	MPC; JPL
603681	2015 FE_{264}	—	February 11, 2008	Mount Lemmon	Mount Lemmon Survey	·	700 m	MPC; JPL
603682	2015 FB_{265}	—	February 16, 2015	Haleakala	Pan-STARRS 1	·	710 m	MPC; JPL
603683	2015 FO_{265}	—	March 11, 2015	Mount Lemmon	Mount Lemmon Survey	·	910 m	MPC; JPL
603684	2015 FE_{270}	—	November 25, 2005	Mount Lemmon	Mount Lemmon Survey	3:2 · SHU	4.4 km	MPC; JPL
603685	2015 FQ_{273}	—	October 24, 2013	Kitt Peak	Spacewatch	·	1.1 km	MPC; JPL
603686	2015 FR_{275}	—	April 27, 2012	Mount Lemmon	Mount Lemmon Survey	·	640 m	MPC; JPL
603687	2015 FH_{276}	—	April 20, 2007	Mount Lemmon	Mount Lemmon Survey	·	1.3 km	MPC; JPL
603688	2015 FU_{277}	—	October 2, 2013	Haleakala	Pan-STARRS 1	V	580 m	MPC; JPL
603689	2015 FP_{280}	—	June 17, 2005	Mount Lemmon	Mount Lemmon Survey	V	740 m	MPC; JPL
603690	2015 FZ_{280}	—	February 8, 2008	Mount Lemmon	Mount Lemmon Survey	·	640 m	MPC; JPL
603691	2015 FN_{282}	—	September 19, 1998	Apache Point	SDSS Collaboration	·	1.3 km	MPC; JPL
603692	2015 FF_{283}	—	January 19, 2015	Haleakala	Pan-STARRS 1	·	780 m	MPC; JPL
603693	2015 FW_{283}	—	January 25, 2014	Haleakala	Pan-STARRS 1	·	2.8 km	MPC; JPL
603694	2015 FM_{286}	—	March 25, 2015	Haleakala	Pan-STARRS 1	PHO	790 m	MPC; JPL
603695	2015 FC_{287}	—	January 28, 2015	Haleakala	Pan-STARRS 1	PHO	860 m	MPC; JPL
603696	2015 FY_{293}	—	February 23, 2015	Haleakala	Pan-STARRS 1	·	1.3 km	MPC; JPL
603697	2015 FN_{297}	—	October 8, 2012	Haleakala	Pan-STARRS 1	MAR	880 m	MPC; JPL
603698	2015 FK_{298}	—	March 9, 2011	Kitt Peak	Spacewatch	·	1.2 km	MPC; JPL
603699	2015 FA_{299}	—	March 13, 2010	Kitt Peak	Spacewatch	·	1.7 km	MPC; JPL
603700	2015 FG_{299}	—	April 30, 2011	Haleakala	Pan-STARRS 1	·	1.2 km	MPC; JPL

== 603701–603800 ==
back to top

Designation			Discovery			Properties		Ref
Permanent	Provisional	Named after	Date	Site	Discoverer(s)	Category	Diam.	Ref
603701	2015 FQ_{299}	—	March 28, 2015	Haleakala	Pan-STARRS 1	·	1.1 km	MPC; JPL
603702	2015 FL_{300}	—	March 28, 2015	Haleakala	Pan-STARRS 1	MAR	830 m	MPC; JPL
603703	2015 FL_{302}	—	March 28, 2015	Haleakala	Pan-STARRS 1	·	1.1 km	MPC; JPL
603704	2015 FH_{304}	—	March 28, 2015	Haleakala	Pan-STARRS 1	·	1.6 km	MPC; JPL
603705	2015 FM_{304}	—	March 28, 2015	Haleakala	Pan-STARRS 1	PHO	850 m	MPC; JPL
603706	2015 FN_{304}	—	March 28, 2015	Haleakala	Pan-STARRS 1	·	3.4 km	MPC; JPL
603707	2015 FT_{304}	—	September 3, 2007	Catalina	CSS	·	2.1 km	MPC; JPL
603708	2015 FV_{304}	—	March 28, 2015	Haleakala	Pan-STARRS 1	·	1.5 km	MPC; JPL
603709	2015 FQ_{305}	—	November 30, 2011	Mount Lemmon	Mount Lemmon Survey	L4 · ERY	6.8 km	MPC; JPL
603710	2015 FV_{308}	—	December 4, 2005	Kitt Peak	Spacewatch	(5)	940 m	MPC; JPL
603711	2015 FY_{308}	—	March 25, 2015	Haleakala	Pan-STARRS 1	·	1.5 km	MPC; JPL
603712	2015 FE_{310}	—	January 25, 2015	Haleakala	Pan-STARRS 1	·	1.4 km	MPC; JPL
603713	2015 FD_{311}	—	March 28, 2008	Kitt Peak	Spacewatch	PHO	840 m	MPC; JPL
603714	2015 FM_{311}	—	August 7, 2008	Kitt Peak	Spacewatch	·	1.3 km	MPC; JPL
603715	2015 FP_{311}	—	March 2, 2011	Kitt Peak	Spacewatch	·	750 m	MPC; JPL
603716	2015 FQ_{311}	—	January 23, 2015	Haleakala	Pan-STARRS 1	·	1.0 km	MPC; JPL
603717	2015 FV_{313}	—	March 25, 2015	Haleakala	Pan-STARRS 1	V	670 m	MPC; JPL
603718	2015 FK_{316}	—	March 22, 2015	Kitt Peak	Spacewatch	·	1.1 km	MPC; JPL
603719	2015 FX_{316}	—	January 25, 2015	Haleakala	Pan-STARRS 1	·	1.5 km	MPC; JPL
603720	2015 FN_{319}	—	December 22, 2008	Kitt Peak	Spacewatch	·	1.3 km	MPC; JPL
603721	2015 FS_{320}	—	September 26, 2003	Apache Point	SDSS Collaboration	·	2.0 km	MPC; JPL
603722	2015 FB_{321}	—	December 1, 2008	Mount Lemmon	Mount Lemmon Survey	EOS	1.8 km	MPC; JPL
603723	2015 FP_{323}	—	March 25, 2015	Haleakala	Pan-STARRS 1	·	840 m	MPC; JPL
603724	2015 FG_{327}	—	January 23, 2015	Haleakala	Pan-STARRS 1	·	1.3 km	MPC; JPL
603725	2015 FQ_{327}	—	August 25, 2012	Haleakala	Pan-STARRS 1	·	1.1 km	MPC; JPL
603726	2015 FK_{329}	—	October 8, 2012	Haleakala	Pan-STARRS 1	·	2.2 km	MPC; JPL
603727	2015 FD_{330}	—	November 10, 2009	Kitt Peak	Spacewatch	V	620 m	MPC; JPL
603728	2015 FW_{333}	—	October 24, 2003	Kitt Peak	Deep Ecliptic Survey	ADE	1.7 km	MPC; JPL
603729	2015 FO_{334}	—	December 3, 2005	Mauna Kea	A. Boattini	·	1.1 km	MPC; JPL
603730	2015 FX_{335}	—	October 23, 2012	Mount Lemmon	Mount Lemmon Survey	·	1.2 km	MPC; JPL
603731	2015 FZ_{335}	—	March 30, 2015	Haleakala	Pan-STARRS 1	·	830 m	MPC; JPL
603732	2015 FE_{339}	—	September 19, 2003	Anderson Mesa	LONEOS	·	950 m	MPC; JPL
603733	2015 FF_{340}	—	January 24, 2015	Haleakala	Pan-STARRS 1	·	1.4 km	MPC; JPL
603734	2015 FT_{340}	—	September 26, 2008	Bergisch Gladbach	W. Bickel	·	1.8 km	MPC; JPL
603735	2015 FG_{342}	—	May 28, 2008	Mount Lemmon	Mount Lemmon Survey	V	670 m	MPC; JPL
603736	2015 FN_{342}	—	April 5, 2011	Mount Lemmon	Mount Lemmon Survey	·	1.1 km	MPC; JPL
603737	2015 FT_{343}	—	January 24, 2015	Haleakala	Pan-STARRS 1	·	1.3 km	MPC; JPL
603738	2015 FG_{344}	—	March 9, 2005	Mount Lemmon	Mount Lemmon Survey	·	2.5 km	MPC; JPL
603739	2015 FG_{347}	—	November 28, 2013	Mount Lemmon	Mount Lemmon Survey	·	1.2 km	MPC; JPL
603740	2015 FN_{347}	—	January 18, 2013	Haleakala	Pan-STARRS 1	L4	8.9 km	MPC; JPL
603741	2015 FZ_{348}	—	March 16, 2015	Haleakala	Pan-STARRS 1	·	1.2 km	MPC; JPL
603742	2015 FJ_{349}	—	March 31, 2003	Apache Point	SDSS Collaboration	L4	8.6 km	MPC; JPL
603743	2015 FF_{354}	—	December 29, 2011	Mount Lemmon	Mount Lemmon Survey	L4 · ERY	7.2 km	MPC; JPL
603744	2015 FL_{354}	—	March 17, 2015	Haleakala	Pan-STARRS 1	·	990 m	MPC; JPL
603745	2015 FM_{356}	—	October 14, 2009	Mount Lemmon	Mount Lemmon Survey	L4	7.5 km	MPC; JPL
603746	2015 FL_{357}	—	March 26, 2004	Kitt Peak	Spacewatch	·	2.7 km	MPC; JPL
603747	2015 FQ_{357}	—	October 6, 2008	Mount Lemmon	Mount Lemmon Survey	L4 · ERY	6.9 km	MPC; JPL
603748	2015 FR_{357}	—	November 27, 2013	Haleakala	Pan-STARRS 1	·	800 m	MPC; JPL
603749	2015 FD_{358}	—	March 17, 2015	Haleakala	Pan-STARRS 1	MAR	610 m	MPC; JPL
603750	2015 FZ_{359}	—	October 1, 2013	Kitt Peak	Spacewatch	·	1.3 km	MPC; JPL
603751	2015 FC_{360}	—	January 20, 2009	Kitt Peak	Spacewatch	·	1.5 km	MPC; JPL
603752	2015 FH_{360}	—	September 18, 2003	Kitt Peak	Spacewatch	H	350 m	MPC; JPL
603753	2015 FC_{361}	—	June 5, 2011	Mount Lemmon	Mount Lemmon Survey	·	1.7 km	MPC; JPL
603754	2015 FJ_{362}	—	September 18, 2006	Catalina	CSS	EOS	2.1 km	MPC; JPL
603755	2015 FJ_{363}	—	February 17, 2004	Kitt Peak	Spacewatch	·	800 m	MPC; JPL
603756	2015 FD_{368}	—	March 18, 2015	Haleakala	Pan-STARRS 1	·	1.1 km	MPC; JPL
603757	2015 FO_{374}	—	September 14, 2006	Kitt Peak	Spacewatch	·	2.6 km	MPC; JPL
603758	2015 FP_{374}	—	February 22, 2004	Kitt Peak	Spacewatch	·	1.6 km	MPC; JPL
603759	2015 FW_{375}	—	March 18, 2015	Haleakala	Pan-STARRS 1	H	440 m	MPC; JPL
603760	2015 FZ_{382}	—	January 11, 2010	Kitt Peak	Spacewatch	·	1.6 km	MPC; JPL
603761	2015 FQ_{384}	—	February 25, 2015	Haleakala	Pan-STARRS 1	·	2.5 km	MPC; JPL
603762	2015 FT_{384}	—	February 25, 2015	Haleakala	Pan-STARRS 1	·	2.0 km	MPC; JPL
603763	2015 FK_{386}	—	October 29, 2010	Mount Lemmon	Mount Lemmon Survey	L4	8.3 km	MPC; JPL
603764	2015 FA_{387}	—	March 20, 2015	Haleakala	Pan-STARRS 1	EUN	790 m	MPC; JPL
603765	2015 FP_{392}	—	October 15, 2009	Mount Lemmon	Mount Lemmon Survey	L4	8.4 km	MPC; JPL
603766	2015 FK_{393}	—	March 30, 2015	Haleakala	Pan-STARRS 1	H	490 m	MPC; JPL
603767	2015 FP_{393}	—	March 24, 2015	Haleakala	Pan-STARRS 1	L4	6.8 km	MPC; JPL
603768	2015 FQ_{393}	—	October 17, 2009	Mount Lemmon	Mount Lemmon Survey	L4	8.3 km	MPC; JPL
603769	2015 FR_{393}	—	September 9, 2008	Mount Lemmon	Mount Lemmon Survey	H	470 m	MPC; JPL
603770	2015 FM_{396}	—	March 31, 2015	Haleakala	Pan-STARRS 1	·	1.5 km	MPC; JPL
603771	2015 FZ_{401}	—	March 21, 2015	Haleakala	Pan-STARRS 1	·	1.5 km	MPC; JPL
603772	2015 FN_{408}	—	January 23, 2015	Haleakala	Pan-STARRS 1	·	1.5 km	MPC; JPL
603773	2015 FE_{409}	—	March 22, 2015	Kitt Peak	Spacewatch	·	1.2 km	MPC; JPL
603774	2015 FV_{409}	—	August 22, 2004	Kitt Peak	Spacewatch	·	910 m	MPC; JPL
603775	2015 FZ_{409}	—	March 22, 2015	Haleakala	Pan-STARRS 1	·	1.4 km	MPC; JPL
603776	2015 FP_{410}	—	October 11, 2005	Kitt Peak	Spacewatch	MAS	570 m	MPC; JPL
603777	2015 FC_{412}	—	January 24, 2014	Haleakala	Pan-STARRS 1	EOS	1.3 km	MPC; JPL
603778	2015 FF_{412}	—	January 3, 2014	Mount Lemmon	Mount Lemmon Survey	·	1.2 km	MPC; JPL
603779	2015 FF_{413}	—	November 6, 2012	Mount Lemmon	Mount Lemmon Survey	·	1.7 km	MPC; JPL
603780	2015 FU_{413}	—	April 26, 2011	Mount Lemmon	Mount Lemmon Survey	·	960 m	MPC; JPL
603781	2015 FN_{414}	—	March 31, 2015	Haleakala	Pan-STARRS 1	·	2.4 km	MPC; JPL
603782	2015 FB_{415}	—	March 25, 2015	Haleakala	Pan-STARRS 1	·	1.2 km	MPC; JPL
603783	2015 FM_{415}	—	March 18, 2015	Haleakala	Pan-STARRS 1	·	1.0 km	MPC; JPL
603784	2015 FT_{416}	—	March 28, 2015	Haleakala	Pan-STARRS 1	·	1.3 km	MPC; JPL
603785	2015 FP_{420}	—	March 30, 2015	Haleakala	Pan-STARRS 1	EUN	780 m	MPC; JPL
603786	2015 FP_{421}	—	March 19, 2015	Haleakala	Pan-STARRS 1	·	1.4 km	MPC; JPL
603787	2015 FU_{423}	—	March 29, 2015	Haleakala	Pan-STARRS 1	L4	7.7 km	MPC; JPL
603788	2015 FO_{424}	—	March 24, 2015	Mount Lemmon	Mount Lemmon Survey	·	1.7 km	MPC; JPL
603789	2015 FN_{425}	—	March 22, 2015	Haleakala	Pan-STARRS 1	·	940 m	MPC; JPL
603790	2015 FJ_{427}	—	March 28, 2015	Haleakala	Pan-STARRS 1	·	1.1 km	MPC; JPL
603791	2015 FF_{431}	—	March 22, 2015	Mount Lemmon	Mount Lemmon Survey	·	940 m	MPC; JPL
603792	2015 FZ_{432}	—	March 21, 2015	Haleakala	Pan-STARRS 1	·	1.2 km	MPC; JPL
603793	2015 FA_{440}	—	March 24, 2015	Haleakala	Pan-STARRS 1	MAS	570 m	MPC; JPL
603794	2015 FL_{441}	—	January 27, 2006	Mount Lemmon	Mount Lemmon Survey	·	1.3 km	MPC; JPL
603795	2015 FA_{446}	—	March 19, 2015	Haleakala	Pan-STARRS 1	·	2.9 km	MPC; JPL
603796	2015 FN_{447}	—	December 30, 2008	Kitt Peak	Spacewatch	·	1.7 km	MPC; JPL
603797	2015 FR_{447}	—	March 17, 2015	Haleakala	Pan-STARRS 1	·	1.9 km	MPC; JPL
603798	2015 FL_{449}	—	March 20, 2015	Haleakala	Pan-STARRS 1	·	1.4 km	MPC; JPL
603799	2015 FF_{450}	—	March 31, 2015	Haleakala	Pan-STARRS 1	H	360 m	MPC; JPL
603800	2015 FM_{450}	—	March 30, 2015	Haleakala	Pan-STARRS 1	GEF	870 m	MPC; JPL

== 603801–603900 ==
back to top

Designation			Discovery			Properties		Ref
Permanent	Provisional	Named after	Date	Site	Discoverer(s)	Category	Diam.	Ref
603801	2015 GU_{6}	—	November 28, 2006	Mount Lemmon	Mount Lemmon Survey	·	1.4 km	MPC; JPL
603802	2015 GO_{7}	—	March 16, 2015	Haleakala	Pan-STARRS 1	·	1.9 km	MPC; JPL
603803	2015 GW_{7}	—	April 13, 2011	Mount Lemmon	Mount Lemmon Survey	·	1.5 km	MPC; JPL
603804	2015 GT_{8}	—	May 6, 2011	Mount Lemmon	Mount Lemmon Survey	·	1.1 km	MPC; JPL
603805	2015 GV_{8}	—	January 8, 2010	Mount Lemmon	Mount Lemmon Survey	MAR	970 m	MPC; JPL
603806	2015 GY_{8}	—	May 23, 2011	Nogales	M. Schwartz, P. R. Holvorcem	·	1.5 km	MPC; JPL
603807	2015 GG_{11}	—	December 19, 2009	Kitt Peak	Spacewatch	·	1.4 km	MPC; JPL
603808	2015 GM_{11}	—	February 18, 2015	Haleakala	Pan-STARRS 1	EUN	780 m	MPC; JPL
603809	2015 GN_{13}	—	December 25, 2011	Kitt Peak	Spacewatch	H	590 m	MPC; JPL
603810	2015 GW_{13}	—	March 29, 2015	Mount Lemmon	Mount Lemmon Survey	H	480 m	MPC; JPL
603811	2015 GH_{16}	—	February 27, 2015	Haleakala	Pan-STARRS 1	·	850 m	MPC; JPL
603812	2015 GP_{19}	—	June 27, 1998	Kitt Peak	Spacewatch	·	1.2 km	MPC; JPL
603813	2015 GY_{20}	—	January 7, 2014	Kitt Peak	Spacewatch	EUN	1.0 km	MPC; JPL
603814	2015 GX_{22}	—	December 8, 2012	Mount Lemmon	Mount Lemmon Survey	EUP	2.7 km	MPC; JPL
603815	2015 GG_{24}	—	February 16, 2015	Haleakala	Pan-STARRS 1	·	2.0 km	MPC; JPL
603816	2015 GD_{25}	—	May 22, 2011	Mount Lemmon	Mount Lemmon Survey	·	1.3 km	MPC; JPL
603817	2015 GY_{26}	—	October 26, 2013	Mount Lemmon	Mount Lemmon Survey	HNS	950 m	MPC; JPL
603818	2015 GO_{27}	—	January 30, 2011	Haleakala	Pan-STARRS 1	·	860 m	MPC; JPL
603819	2015 GW_{30}	—	January 20, 2013	Kitt Peak	Spacewatch	L4	7.2 km	MPC; JPL
603820	2015 GD_{33}	—	January 17, 2007	Kitt Peak	Spacewatch	·	1.0 km	MPC; JPL
603821	2015 GL_{33}	—	March 9, 2011	Mount Lemmon	Mount Lemmon Survey	·	840 m	MPC; JPL
603822	2015 GT_{35}	—	April 14, 2015	Mount Lemmon	Mount Lemmon Survey	MAR	700 m	MPC; JPL
603823	2015 GV_{35}	—	May 22, 2011	Mount Lemmon	Mount Lemmon Survey	·	1.1 km	MPC; JPL
603824	2015 GP_{36}	—	June 4, 2011	Mount Lemmon	Mount Lemmon Survey	·	1.4 km	MPC; JPL
603825	2015 GX_{38}	—	May 22, 2011	Mount Lemmon	Mount Lemmon Survey	·	1.4 km	MPC; JPL
603826	2015 GS_{41}	—	January 23, 2015	Haleakala	Pan-STARRS 1	MAR	830 m	MPC; JPL
603827	2015 GC_{44}	—	September 24, 2008	Kitt Peak	Spacewatch	EUN	1.1 km	MPC; JPL
603828	2015 GE_{47}	—	February 13, 2002	Apache Point	SDSS Collaboration	L4	7.8 km	MPC; JPL
603829	2015 GK_{47}	—	May 15, 2008	Kitt Peak	Spacewatch	V	570 m	MPC; JPL
603830	2015 GZ_{50}	—	April 10, 2015	Haleakala	Pan-STARRS 1	H	440 m	MPC; JPL
603831	2015 GT_{51}	—	September 18, 2007	Mount Lemmon	Mount Lemmon Survey	·	1.1 km	MPC; JPL
603832	2015 GB_{52}	—	October 6, 2008	Mount Lemmon	Mount Lemmon Survey	·	900 m	MPC; JPL
603833	2015 GD_{52}	—	March 21, 2009	Mount Lemmon	Mount Lemmon Survey	EUP	3.1 km	MPC; JPL
603834	2015 GT_{59}	—	May 27, 2003	Kitt Peak	Spacewatch	·	1.1 km	MPC; JPL
603835	2015 GT_{63}	—	April 14, 2015	Mount Lemmon	Mount Lemmon Survey	L4	6.5 km	MPC; JPL
603836	2015 GA_{65}	—	April 13, 2015	Haleakala	Pan-STARRS 1	L4	8.2 km	MPC; JPL
603837	2015 HL	—	April 4, 2002	Palomar	NEAT	·	1.5 km	MPC; JPL
603838	2015 HB_{2}	—	November 28, 2014	Haleakala	Pan-STARRS 1	BRA	1.5 km	MPC; JPL
603839	2015 HC_{3}	—	August 21, 2003	Palomar	NEAT	·	1.8 km	MPC; JPL
603840	2015 HO_{5}	—	September 3, 2000	Apache Point	SDSS	·	1.6 km	MPC; JPL
603841	2015 HZ_{10}	—	March 22, 2015	Haleakala	Pan-STARRS 1	H	490 m	MPC; JPL
603842	2015 HC_{14}	—	February 23, 2015	Haleakala	Pan-STARRS 1	·	1.1 km	MPC; JPL
603843	2015 HF_{17}	—	November 2, 2010	Mount Lemmon	Mount Lemmon Survey	L4	6.5 km	MPC; JPL
603844	2015 HO_{18}	—	April 6, 2011	Kitt Peak	Spacewatch	·	1.4 km	MPC; JPL
603845	2015 HM_{21}	—	January 9, 2011	Mount Lemmon	Mount Lemmon Survey	·	1.0 km	MPC; JPL
603846	2015 HR_{21}	—	April 29, 2011	Mount Lemmon	Mount Lemmon Survey	·	910 m	MPC; JPL
603847	2015 HK_{25}	—	October 8, 2007	Mount Lemmon	Mount Lemmon Survey	THM	1.7 km	MPC; JPL
603848	2015 HE_{26}	—	March 18, 2015	Haleakala	Pan-STARRS 1	NEM	1.8 km	MPC; JPL
603849	2015 HK_{26}	—	November 1, 2013	Mount Lemmon	Mount Lemmon Survey	RAF	660 m	MPC; JPL
603850	2015 HT_{26}	—	April 14, 2015	Mount Lemmon	Mount Lemmon Survey	·	1.0 km	MPC; JPL
603851	2015 HL_{27}	—	October 11, 2007	Kitt Peak	Spacewatch	(22805)	2.3 km	MPC; JPL
603852	2015 HT_{27}	—	March 5, 2006	Kitt Peak	Spacewatch	·	1.1 km	MPC; JPL
603853	2015 HG_{29}	—	March 10, 2011	Catalina	CSS	·	840 m	MPC; JPL
603854	2015 HD_{30}	—	September 18, 2003	Kitt Peak	Spacewatch	ADE	1.4 km	MPC; JPL
603855	2015 HW_{32}	—	February 4, 2006	Kitt Peak	Spacewatch	·	1.3 km	MPC; JPL
603856	2015 HL_{34}	—	May 13, 2008	Mount Lemmon	Mount Lemmon Survey	V	480 m	MPC; JPL
603857	2015 HG_{35}	—	March 17, 2015	Haleakala	Pan-STARRS 1	·	1.4 km	MPC; JPL
603858	2015 HN_{35}	—	December 3, 2005	Mauna Kea	A. Boattini	·	1.8 km	MPC; JPL
603859	2015 HC_{37}	—	March 18, 2015	Haleakala	Pan-STARRS 1	·	860 m	MPC; JPL
603860	2015 HF_{37}	—	November 7, 2012	Haleakala	Pan-STARRS 1	·	1.9 km	MPC; JPL
603861	2015 HW_{38}	—	November 27, 2013	Haleakala	Pan-STARRS 1	HNS	1.0 km	MPC; JPL
603862	2015 HA_{39}	—	February 23, 2015	Haleakala	Pan-STARRS 1	·	1.3 km	MPC; JPL
603863	2015 HY_{40}	—	May 31, 2008	Kitt Peak	Spacewatch	·	820 m	MPC; JPL
603864	2015 HZ_{42}	—	October 20, 2012	Haleakala	Pan-STARRS 1	·	1.9 km	MPC; JPL
603865	2015 HH_{43}	—	May 11, 2005	Kitt Peak	Spacewatch	H	440 m	MPC; JPL
603866	2015 HH_{44}	—	October 26, 2005	Kitt Peak	Spacewatch	·	1.1 km	MPC; JPL
603867	2015 HZ_{45}	—	July 29, 2005	Palomar	NEAT	·	1.0 km	MPC; JPL
603868	2015 HJ_{47}	—	September 28, 2009	Mount Lemmon	Mount Lemmon Survey	L4	7.8 km	MPC; JPL
603869	2015 HZ_{49}	—	November 9, 2013	Kitt Peak	Spacewatch	·	1.2 km	MPC; JPL
603870	2015 HX_{50}	—	January 17, 2007	Kitt Peak	Spacewatch	V	530 m	MPC; JPL
603871	2015 HE_{52}	—	October 26, 2013	Mount Lemmon	Mount Lemmon Survey	·	1.2 km	MPC; JPL
603872	2015 HV_{56}	—	December 24, 2013	Mount Lemmon	Mount Lemmon Survey	·	1.4 km	MPC; JPL
603873	2015 HS_{57}	—	January 20, 2015	Haleakala	Pan-STARRS 1	·	1.3 km	MPC; JPL
603874	2015 HC_{58}	—	June 5, 2011	Mount Lemmon	Mount Lemmon Survey	GEF	1.2 km	MPC; JPL
603875	2015 HH_{60}	—	September 4, 2011	Haleakala	Pan-STARRS 1	TIR	2.6 km	MPC; JPL
603876	2015 HC_{61}	—	November 3, 1999	Kitt Peak	Spacewatch	·	1.6 km	MPC; JPL
603877	2015 HJ_{61}	—	October 5, 2005	Catalina	CSS	·	1.3 km	MPC; JPL
603878	2015 HZ_{61}	—	March 21, 2015	Haleakala	Pan-STARRS 1	·	980 m	MPC; JPL
603879	2015 HC_{63}	—	November 12, 2007	Mount Lemmon	Mount Lemmon Survey	LIX	2.7 km	MPC; JPL
603880	2015 HE_{63}	—	April 21, 2002	Kitt Peak	Spacewatch	·	1.2 km	MPC; JPL
603881	2015 HR_{63}	—	August 13, 2012	Haleakala	Pan-STARRS 1	V	550 m	MPC; JPL
603882	2015 HX_{63}	—	September 13, 2007	Mount Lemmon	Mount Lemmon Survey	AEO	1.1 km	MPC; JPL
603883	2015 HJ_{64}	—	July 15, 2005	Kitt Peak	Spacewatch	·	2.1 km	MPC; JPL
603884	2015 HN_{64}	—	February 27, 2006	Kitt Peak	Spacewatch	·	1.2 km	MPC; JPL
603885	2015 HC_{65}	—	March 17, 2015	Haleakala	Pan-STARRS 1	·	900 m	MPC; JPL
603886	2015 HR_{66}	—	August 25, 2012	Haleakala	Pan-STARRS 1	NYS	1.2 km	MPC; JPL
603887	2015 HY_{66}	—	October 19, 2012	Haleakala	Pan-STARRS 1	·	1.0 km	MPC; JPL
603888	2015 HT_{68}	—	October 8, 2012	Mount Lemmon	Mount Lemmon Survey	·	1.5 km	MPC; JPL
603889	2015 HN_{69}	—	March 18, 2015	Haleakala	Pan-STARRS 1	·	1.5 km	MPC; JPL
603890	2015 HP_{69}	—	May 31, 2008	Kitt Peak	Spacewatch	·	600 m	MPC; JPL
603891	2015 HR_{73}	—	May 13, 2011	Mount Lemmon	Mount Lemmon Survey	(5)	980 m	MPC; JPL
603892	2015 HU_{75}	—	January 27, 2007	Mount Lemmon	Mount Lemmon Survey	MAS	590 m	MPC; JPL
603893	2015 HA_{77}	—	April 5, 2008	Kitt Peak	Spacewatch	·	560 m	MPC; JPL
603894	2015 HJ_{78}	—	February 27, 2001	Kitt Peak	Spacewatch	AEO	960 m	MPC; JPL
603895	2015 HN_{79}	—	November 14, 2012	Kitt Peak	Spacewatch	EOS	1.5 km	MPC; JPL
603896	2015 HF_{81}	—	April 23, 2015	Haleakala	Pan-STARRS 1	·	660 m	MPC; JPL
603897	2015 HY_{81}	—	April 23, 2015	Haleakala	Pan-STARRS 1	NYS	820 m	MPC; JPL
603898	2015 HE_{82}	—	February 18, 2008	Mount Lemmon	Mount Lemmon Survey	·	540 m	MPC; JPL
603899	2015 HM_{82}	—	October 17, 2007	Mount Lemmon	Mount Lemmon Survey	THM	1.9 km	MPC; JPL
603900	2015 HX_{83}	—	March 24, 2006	Kitt Peak	Spacewatch	·	1.3 km	MPC; JPL

== 603901–604000 ==
back to top

Designation			Discovery			Properties		Ref
Permanent	Provisional	Named after	Date	Site	Discoverer(s)	Category	Diam.	Ref
603901	2015 HT_{86}	—	October 15, 2012	Haleakala	Pan-STARRS 1	·	1.7 km	MPC; JPL
603902	2015 HL_{88}	—	May 26, 2011	Kitt Peak	Spacewatch	·	780 m	MPC; JPL
603903	2015 HJ_{90}	—	May 21, 2011	Mount Lemmon	Mount Lemmon Survey	KON	2.0 km	MPC; JPL
603904	2015 HN_{90}	—	April 11, 2015	Kitt Peak	Spacewatch	·	970 m	MPC; JPL
603905	2015 HM_{92}	—	October 9, 2012	Haleakala	Pan-STARRS 1	·	1.2 km	MPC; JPL
603906	2015 HZ_{92}	—	November 10, 2009	Kitt Peak	Spacewatch	·	820 m	MPC; JPL
603907	2015 HK_{93}	—	May 25, 2011	Nogales	M. Schwartz, P. R. Holvorcem	·	910 m	MPC; JPL
603908	2015 HF_{96}	—	November 9, 2004	Mauna Kea	Veillet, C.	·	930 m	MPC; JPL
603909	2015 HN_{96}	—	September 18, 2001	Kitt Peak	Spacewatch	3:2 · SHU	4.1 km	MPC; JPL
603910	2015 HS_{96}	—	October 11, 2007	Mount Lemmon	Mount Lemmon Survey	·	1.6 km	MPC; JPL
603911	2015 HV_{96}	—	April 17, 2015	Mount Lemmon	Mount Lemmon Survey	·	900 m	MPC; JPL
603912	2015 HX_{99}	—	April 23, 2015	Haleakala	Pan-STARRS 1	MAS	590 m	MPC; JPL
603913	2015 HS_{101}	—	January 28, 2015	Haleakala	Pan-STARRS 1	H	480 m	MPC; JPL
603914	2015 HO_{106}	—	January 5, 2006	Mount Lemmon	Mount Lemmon Survey	·	1.3 km	MPC; JPL
603915	2015 HW_{106}	—	April 13, 2015	Haleakala	Pan-STARRS 1	URS	2.4 km	MPC; JPL
603916	2015 HY_{110}	—	May 25, 2011	Kitt Peak	Spacewatch	·	1.0 km	MPC; JPL
603917	2015 HB_{112}	—	December 4, 2013	Haleakala	Pan-STARRS 1	·	1.8 km	MPC; JPL
603918	2015 HY_{112}	—	February 23, 2015	Haleakala	Pan-STARRS 1	·	860 m	MPC; JPL
603919	2015 HD_{114}	—	November 21, 2009	Mount Lemmon	Mount Lemmon Survey	ADE	1.5 km	MPC; JPL
603920	2015 HH_{115}	—	February 16, 2015	Haleakala	Pan-STARRS 1	ADE	1.3 km	MPC; JPL
603921	2015 HL_{115}	—	February 16, 2015	Haleakala	Pan-STARRS 1	EUN	1.1 km	MPC; JPL
603922	2015 HN_{115}	—	December 30, 2013	Haleakala	Pan-STARRS 1	·	1.3 km	MPC; JPL
603923	2015 HG_{116}	—	February 23, 2015	Haleakala	Pan-STARRS 1	WAT	1.4 km	MPC; JPL
603924	2015 HY_{119}	—	October 17, 2012	Haleakala	Pan-STARRS 1	·	1.1 km	MPC; JPL
603925	2015 HV_{122}	—	October 22, 2009	Mount Lemmon	Mount Lemmon Survey	L4	7.0 km	MPC; JPL
603926	2015 HH_{124}	—	October 8, 2012	Mount Lemmon	Mount Lemmon Survey	·	2.1 km	MPC; JPL
603927	2015 HC_{126}	—	February 4, 2006	Mount Lemmon	Mount Lemmon Survey	·	950 m	MPC; JPL
603928	2015 HG_{126}	—	January 4, 2012	Mount Lemmon	Mount Lemmon Survey	L4	6.1 km	MPC; JPL
603929	2015 HA_{127}	—	March 4, 2011	Mount Lemmon	Mount Lemmon Survey	·	910 m	MPC; JPL
603930	2015 HH_{127}	—	April 23, 2015	Haleakala	Pan-STARRS 1	·	530 m	MPC; JPL
603931	2015 HA_{129}	—	September 5, 2007	Catalina	CSS	(1547)	1.2 km	MPC; JPL
603932	2015 HF_{129}	—	October 18, 2012	Haleakala	Pan-STARRS 1	·	1.0 km	MPC; JPL
603933	2015 HE_{130}	—	October 10, 2007	Mount Lemmon	Mount Lemmon Survey	·	1.9 km	MPC; JPL
603934	2015 HP_{131}	—	April 23, 2015	Haleakala	Pan-STARRS 1	·	1.2 km	MPC; JPL
603935	2015 HN_{132}	—	November 1, 2006	Mount Lemmon	Mount Lemmon Survey	·	720 m	MPC; JPL
603936	2015 HR_{136}	—	December 7, 2005	Catalina	CSS	·	840 m	MPC; JPL
603937	2015 HE_{138}	—	October 5, 2012	Mount Lemmon	Mount Lemmon Survey	·	1.5 km	MPC; JPL
603938	2015 HZ_{138}	—	September 18, 2003	Kitt Peak	Spacewatch	·	1.3 km	MPC; JPL
603939	2015 HE_{140}	—	October 25, 2008	Mount Lemmon	Mount Lemmon Survey	·	1.2 km	MPC; JPL
603940	2015 HB_{141}	—	September 21, 2003	Kitt Peak	Spacewatch	EUN	930 m	MPC; JPL
603941	2015 HK_{143}	—	June 2, 2011	Haleakala	Pan-STARRS 1	·	1.0 km	MPC; JPL
603942	2015 HF_{145}	—	October 5, 2013	Haleakala	Pan-STARRS 1	·	850 m	MPC; JPL
603943	2015 HL_{145}	—	May 9, 2007	Mount Lemmon	Mount Lemmon Survey	MAR	1 km	MPC; JPL
603944	2015 HP_{146}	—	October 4, 2007	Kitt Peak	Spacewatch	·	1.8 km	MPC; JPL
603945	2015 HB_{147}	—	May 9, 2007	Mount Lemmon	Mount Lemmon Survey	·	760 m	MPC; JPL
603946	2015 HA_{149}	—	September 19, 2012	Charleston	R. Holmes	·	1.5 km	MPC; JPL
603947	2015 HC_{149}	—	April 23, 2015	Haleakala	Pan-STARRS 1	EUN	670 m	MPC; JPL
603948	2015 HG_{150}	—	September 21, 2012	Mount Lemmon	Mount Lemmon Survey	·	1.3 km	MPC; JPL
603949	2015 HQ_{150}	—	September 18, 2012	Mount Lemmon	Mount Lemmon Survey	·	1.2 km	MPC; JPL
603950	2015 HA_{151}	—	April 23, 2015	Haleakala	Pan-STARRS 1	·	1.3 km	MPC; JPL
603951	2015 HY_{156}	—	October 9, 2012	Haleakala	Pan-STARRS 1	·	1.5 km	MPC; JPL
603952	2015 HM_{157}	—	October 8, 2007	Mount Lemmon	Mount Lemmon Survey	·	2.1 km	MPC; JPL
603953	2015 HC_{158}	—	March 20, 2007	Kitt Peak	Spacewatch	·	910 m	MPC; JPL
603954	2015 HJ_{160}	—	November 7, 2012	Mount Lemmon	Mount Lemmon Survey	·	1.3 km	MPC; JPL
603955	2015 HB_{164}	—	November 18, 2008	Kitt Peak	Spacewatch	·	1.7 km	MPC; JPL
603956	2015 HT_{164}	—	September 25, 2005	Kitt Peak	Spacewatch	·	920 m	MPC; JPL
603957	2015 HT_{165}	—	September 18, 2003	Kitt Peak	Spacewatch	·	1.1 km	MPC; JPL
603958	2015 HP_{169}	—	March 2, 2006	Kitt Peak	Spacewatch	·	1.4 km	MPC; JPL
603959	2015 HH_{171}	—	April 16, 2007	Catalina	CSS	H	470 m	MPC; JPL
603960	2015 HL_{173}	—	September 22, 2003	Kitt Peak	Spacewatch	·	1.4 km	MPC; JPL
603961	2015 HT_{174}	—	January 23, 2015	Haleakala	Pan-STARRS 1	·	1.9 km	MPC; JPL
603962	2015 HU_{174}	—	January 26, 2011	Mount Lemmon	Mount Lemmon Survey	·	880 m	MPC; JPL
603963	2015 HY_{174}	—	August 31, 2005	Kitt Peak	Spacewatch	·	680 m	MPC; JPL
603964	2015 HA_{175}	—	April 3, 2002	Kitt Peak	Spacewatch	JUN	850 m	MPC; JPL
603965	2015 HA_{176}	—	May 5, 2002	Palomar	NEAT	·	1.6 km	MPC; JPL
603966	2015 HV_{176}	—	March 29, 2015	Mount Lemmon	Mount Lemmon Survey	H	460 m	MPC; JPL
603967	2015 HJ_{177}	—	October 10, 2008	Mount Lemmon	Mount Lemmon Survey	·	1.8 km	MPC; JPL
603968	2015 HQ_{178}	—	April 1, 2015	Haleakala	Pan-STARRS 1	EOS	2.0 km	MPC; JPL
603969	2015 HW_{178}	—	March 31, 2011	Mount Lemmon	Mount Lemmon Survey	HNS	1.2 km	MPC; JPL
603970	2015 HX_{178}	—	October 23, 2003	Kitt Peak	Spacewatch	BAR	900 m	MPC; JPL
603971	2015 HW_{179}	—	April 1, 2015	Haleakala	Pan-STARRS 1	·	1 km	MPC; JPL
603972	2015 HM_{183}	—	April 22, 2015	Mount Lemmon	Mount Lemmon Survey	H	420 m	MPC; JPL
603973	2015 HV_{185}	—	April 20, 2015	Haleakala	Pan-STARRS 1	·	880 m	MPC; JPL
603974	2015 HW_{185}	—	March 25, 2006	Kitt Peak	Spacewatch	·	1.1 km	MPC; JPL
603975	2015 HG_{187}	—	April 18, 2015	Haleakala	Pan-STARRS 1	MAR	830 m	MPC; JPL
603976	2015 HN_{188}	—	April 18, 2015	Kitt Peak	Spacewatch	·	1 km	MPC; JPL
603977	2015 HQ_{189}	—	October 31, 2005	Mauna Kea	A. Boattini	·	1.6 km	MPC; JPL
603978	2015 HF_{193}	—	April 25, 2015	Haleakala	Pan-STARRS 1	·	1.3 km	MPC; JPL
603979	2015 HC_{194}	—	April 25, 2015	Haleakala	Pan-STARRS 1	·	1.8 km	MPC; JPL
603980	2015 HY_{199}	—	April 20, 2015	Haleakala	Pan-STARRS 1	·	1.1 km	MPC; JPL
603981	2015 HT_{203}	—	April 18, 2015	Kitt Peak	Spacewatch	·	1.3 km	MPC; JPL
603982	2015 HX_{203}	—	April 23, 2015	Haleakala	Pan-STARRS 1	·	1.0 km	MPC; JPL
603983	2015 HR_{211}	—	April 25, 2015	Haleakala	Pan-STARRS 1	·	1.1 km	MPC; JPL
603984	2015 HL_{217}	—	April 28, 2015	Nogales	M. Schwartz, P. R. Holvorcem	H	410 m	MPC; JPL
603985	2015 HM_{220}	—	April 25, 2015	Haleakala	Pan-STARRS 1	·	2.0 km	MPC; JPL
603986	2015 HG_{224}	—	April 23, 2015	Haleakala	Pan-STARRS 1	·	1.7 km	MPC; JPL
603987	2015 JV_{3}	—	January 10, 2014	Mount Lemmon	Mount Lemmon Survey	·	2.2 km	MPC; JPL
603988	2015 JS_{5}	—	April 20, 2015	Haleakala	Pan-STARRS 1	·	1.6 km	MPC; JPL
603989	2015 JX_{5}	—	October 7, 2005	Mauna Kea	A. Boattini	·	1.4 km	MPC; JPL
603990	2015 JG_{7}	—	September 15, 2013	Haleakala	Pan-STARRS 1	H	280 m	MPC; JPL
603991	2015 JK_{11}	—	June 23, 2010	Nogales	M. Schwartz, P. R. Holvorcem	H	560 m	MPC; JPL
603992	2015 JZ_{11}	—	September 28, 2003	Kitt Peak	Spacewatch	H	310 m	MPC; JPL
603993	2015 JX_{12}	—	March 13, 2005	Mount Lemmon	Mount Lemmon Survey	·	1.4 km	MPC; JPL
603994	2015 JF_{14}	—	May 10, 2015	Mount Lemmon	Mount Lemmon Survey	·	1.2 km	MPC; JPL
603995	2015 JV_{15}	—	September 24, 2008	Kitt Peak	Spacewatch	·	1.1 km	MPC; JPL
603996	2015 JF_{16}	—	March 21, 2015	Haleakala	Pan-STARRS 1	·	520 m	MPC; JPL
603997	2015 JO_{17}	—	May 12, 2015	Mount Lemmon	Mount Lemmon Survey	·	1.0 km	MPC; JPL
603998	2015 KJ_{1}	—	January 28, 2015	Haleakala	Pan-STARRS 1	·	1.5 km	MPC; JPL
603999	2015 KE_{2}	—	October 27, 2009	Mount Lemmon	Mount Lemmon Survey	·	1.3 km	MPC; JPL
604000	2015 KO_{6}	—	March 21, 2015	Haleakala	Pan-STARRS 1	T_{j} (2.98)	3.2 km	MPC; JPL

back to top

== Meaning of names ==
As minor planet discoveries are confirmed, they are given a permanent number by the IAU's Minor Planet Center (MPC), and the discoverers can then submit names for them, following the IAU's naming conventions. The list below concerns those minor planets in the specified number-range that have received names, and explains the meanings of those names.

Official naming citations of newly named small Solar System bodies are approved and published in a bulletin by IAU's Working Group for Small Bodies Nomenclature (WGSBN). Before May 2021, citations were published in MPC's Minor Planet Circulars for many decades. Recent citations can also be found on the JPL Small-Body Database (SBDB). Until his death in 2016, German astronomer Lutz D. Schmadel compiled these citations into the Dictionary of Minor Planet Names (DMP) and regularly updated the collection.

Based on Paul Herget's The Names of the Minor Planets, Schmadel also researched the unclear origin of numerous asteroids, most of which had been named prior to World War II. This article incorporates text from this source, which is in the public domain: SBDB New namings may only be added to this list below after official publication as the preannouncement of names is condemned. The WGSBN publishes a comprehensive guideline for the naming rules of non-cometary small Solar System bodies.

Named minor planet	Provisional	This minor planet was named for...	Ref; Catalog
603021 Galyatető	2014 WT_{17}	Galyatető, a well-known resort village in the Mátra Mountain, near the Piszkéstető Observatory.	IAU · 603021
603195 Gilmour	2015 AL_{177}	David Gilmour, English musician and one of the most influential guitar players of the 20th century. For several decades he was a vocalist, guitarist and composer in the English rock band Pink Floyd.	IAU · 603195
603200 Yuchichung	2015 AY_{209}	Chi-Chung Yu (1910–2002), a veteran journalist and distinguished alum of the National Central University.	IAU · 603200
603260 Jónáskároly	2015 BQ_{118}	Károly Jónás, Hungarian amateur astronomer.	IAU · 603260
603380 Dorisbrougham	2015 CO_{17}	Doris Brougham (1926–2024), an American and Taiwanese educator.	IAU · 603380
603562 Vadimsouley	2015 FR_{21}	Vadim Souleyman Christophe (b. 2011) is a grandson of the discoverer.	IAU · 603562
