= 2011 Heart of America Athletic Conference football season =

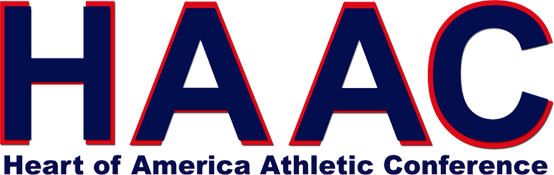
- League: NAIA
- Sport: football
- Duration: Fall-Winter 2011
- Teams: 10

Regular season

Football seasons
- 2010 2012

2011 Heart of America Athletic Conference football standings
	Conf.			Overall
Team	W		L	W		L
No. 6 MidAmerica Nazarene +^	8	–	1	10	–	2
No. 10 Missouri Valley +^	8	–	1	9	–	2
No. 13 Benedictine (KS) ^	7	–	2	9	–	3
No. 21 Baker	6	–	3	7	–	3
Central Methodist	5	–	4	5	–	5
Avila	4	–	5	4	–	6
Evangel	3	–	6	3	–	7
Peru State	2	–	7	2	–	8
Graceland	1	–	8	1	–	9
Culver–Stockton	1	–	8	1	–	10
+ – Conference co-champions; ^ – NAIA playoff participant; Rankings from NAIA Coaches' Poll

The 2011 Heart of America Athletic Conference football season is made up of 10 college athletic programs that compete in the Heart of America Athletic Conference (HAAC) under the National Association of Intercollegiate Athletics (NAIA) for the 2011 college football season. The season began play on August 27 with the Victory Sports Network College Fanz First Down Classic.

== Conference teams and information ==
School	Mascot	Head coach	Location	Stadium
Avila	Eagles	Justin Berna	Kansas City, Missouri	Vincent P. Dasta Stadium
Baker	Wildcats	Mike Grossner	Baldwin City, Kansas	Liston Stadium
Benedictine	Ravens	Larry Wilcox	Atchison, Kansas	Larry Wilcox Stadium
Central Methodist	Eagles	Alan Dykens	Fayette, Missouri	Davis Field
Culver-Stockton	Wildcats	Jeff Duvendeck	Canton, Missouri	Ellison Poulton Stadium
Evangel	Crusaders	Brenton Illum	Springfield, Missouri	JFK Stadium
Graceland	Yellowjackets	Jeff Douglas	Lamoni, Iowa	Huntsman Field
MidAmerica Nazarene	Pioneers	Jonathan Quinn	Olathe, Kansas	Pioneer Stadium
Missouri Valley	Vikings	Paul Troth	Marshall, Missouri	Gregg-Mitchell Field
Peru State	Bobcats	Terry Clark	Peru, Nebraska	Oak Bowl

== Schedule ==
Schedule is subject to change.

Index to colors and formatting
HAAC member won
HAAC member lost
Winning team in **bold**

=== Week 0 ===
Date	Time	Visiting team	Home team	Site	TV	Result	Attendance	Ref.
August 27, 2011	1:00 PM	Concordia University	No. 22 **Benedictine**	Larry Wilcox Stadium • Atchison, Kansas	Benedictine Raven Sports Network	**W** 45–0	–	
August 27, 2011	7:00 PM	No. 10 Ottawa	No. 23 **Baker**	Liston Stadium • Baldwin City, Kansas (College Fanz First Down Classic)	Victory Sports Network	**W** 41–16	–	
^{#}Rankings from NAIA Coaches' Poll. All times are in Central Time.

==== Concordia vs. #22 Benedictine ====
	1	2	3	4	Total
Concordia	0	0	0	0	**0**
**#22 Benedictine**	7	17	14	7	**45**

Benedictine dominated the game starting when Cameron Fore caught a 4–yard pass from quarterback Bill Noonan for a touchdown in the first quarter. Benedictine accumulated 442 yards of total offense in 67 plays, averaging 6.6 yards per play. They scored six touchdowns (3 rushing and 3 passing) and committed only one penalty for five yards the entire game.

Benedictine earned 19 first downs on offense where Concordia only achieved a total of 4. The score ended with a Benedictine victory at 45–0.

==== #10 Ottawa vs. #23 Baker ====
	1	2	3	4	Total
#10 Ottawa	13	3	0	0	**16**
**#23 Baker**	14	3	10	14	**41**

Nationally ranked at #23, Baker University upset #10 ranked Ottawa University in the 2011 College Fanz First Down Classic played at Liston Stadium in Baldwin City, Kansas. Ottawa scored first when Shane Gimzo completed a 9-yard run for a touchdown with 9:02 remaining in the first quarter. It was the only lead Ottawa would hold for the entire game, which they lost when Baker's Tyler Hatcher ran the kickoff return for 82 yards for a touchdown and Andrew Kimrey completed the PAT kick. Later that same quarter, Baker's Reggie Harris ran a 62-yard punt return for a touchdown to take the lead.

Ottawa managed to get close several times with the score at the end of the first half with Baker leading 17–16.

Baker managed to hold Ottawa scoreless in the second half of play while scoring three touchdowns and a field goal. Baker recovered two fumbles and intercepted two passes to win with a final score of 41–16.

Baker Running Back John Babb was named the game's Offensive MVP with 102 rushing yards on 10 attempts, 1 reception for 11 yards, and a Touchdown. Baker Outside Linebacker Adam Steele was named Defensive MVP with 16 tackles (7 Unassisted), 2 Interceptions and One Tackle for Loss.

=== Week 1 ===
Date	Time	Visiting team	Home team	Site	TV	Result	Attendance	Ref.
September 1, 2011	6:30 PM	Evangel	**Nicholls State** (NCAA Division I FCS)	Guidry Stadium • Thibodaux, Louisiana		**L** 42–12	–	
September 3, 2011	1:30 PM	Graceland	**Culver-Stockton**	Ellison Poulton Stadium • Canton, Missouri		35–10 ^{0}	–	
September 3, 2011	2:00 PM	Avila	**Lincoln University**	Dwight T. Reed Stadium • Jefferson City, Missouri		**L** 35–3	–	
September 3, 2011	5:00 PM	No. 22 **Benedictine**	Sterling	Smisor Stadium • Sterling, Kansas		**W** 0–14	–	
September 3, 2011	6:00 PM	Central Methodist	No. 3 **MidAmerica Nazarene**	Pioneer Stadium • Olathe, Kansas		24–0	–	
September 3, 2011	6:00 PM	No. 12 McPherson	No. 11 **Missouri Valley College**	Gregg-Mitchell Field • Marshall, Missouri		**W** 47–10	–	
September 3, 2011	6:00 PM	Peru State	No. 23 **Baker**	Liston Stadium • Baldwin City, Kansas		55–12	–	
^{#}Rankings from NAIA Coaches' Poll. All times are in Central Time.

==== Evangel vs. Nicholls State ====
	1	2	3	4	Total
Evangel	0	0	0	0	**0**
**Nicholls State**	21	7	7	7	**42**

Evangel played outside the NAIA against NCAA Division I FCS Nicholls State of the Southland Conference and failed to score a single point. Conversely, Nicholls scored 21 points in the first quarter and stacked together 422 yards of total offense while limiting Evangel to 147, leaving the final score at 42–0.

Andre Brimhall led Evangel with 76 yards passing and 14 rushing. Evangel suffered particularly in controlling the ball and losing turnovers.

==== Graceland vs. Culver-Stockton ====
	1	2	3	4	Total
Graceland	0	10	0	0	**10**
**Culver-Stockton**	5	0	13	17	**35**

Culver-Stockton started off with 5 points in the first quarter, but Graceland answered with ten in the second to lead 10–5 at halftime. But the lead Graceland gained was lost in the third quarter and went unanswered for the rest of the game as Culver-Stockton scored 30 points in the second half.

Culver-Stockton's defense scored twice, once with a safety and then again with a touchdown by advancing a fumble. It was the first season-opening win for Culver-Stockton since 2005.

==== Avila vs. Lincoln ====
	1	2	3	4	Total
Avila	0	0	0	3	**3**
**Lincoln**	0	20	8	7	**35**

NCAA Division II Lincoln University of Missouri (a member of the MIAA) managed 453 yards of total offense and held NAIA Avila to 270 yards in their 35–3 victory. Neither team scored until the second quarter when Lincoln running back Deon Brock caught a 36-yard from freshmen quarterback Robert Redmond for a touchdown, capping a 62-yard drive. Lioncoln failed to convert the extra point.

==== #22 Benedictine vs. Sterling ====
	1	2	3	4	Total
**#22 Benedictine**	7	7	0	0	**14**
Sterling	0	0	0	0	**0**

Sterling lost its second consecutive game and its home opener to #22 ranked Benedictine. Benedictine managed to achieve 265 yards in total offense where Sterling managed only 76. Both teams combined for 17 punts in the game for a total of 337 yards punting. On defense, Sterling managed one interception for 20 yards but also lost a fumble on offense.

The only scores came from Benedictine's two touchdowns and extra points in the first and second quarter, leaving the final score at 14–0.

==== Central Methodist vs. #3 MidAmerica Nazarene ====
	1	2	3	4	Total
Central Methodist	0	0	0	0	**0**
**#3 MidAmerica Nazarene**	7	14	0	3	**24**

The MidAmerica Nazarene Pioneers outscored the Central Methodist Eagles 24–0 in Olathe. Nazarene accumulated 402 yards of total offense and held the Eagles to 192. The Pioneers scored all three touchdowns on the ground and an additional field goal in the fourth quarter.

With this victory, MidAmerica Nazarene extended their domination of the series to 28–3, winning the last three matchups of the two schools.

==== #12 McPherson vs. #11 Missouri Valley ====
	1	2	3	4	Total
#12 McPherson	3	0	0	7	**10**
**#11 Missouri Valley**	14	6	7	20	**47**

#11 Missouri Valley proved its ranking above #12 McPherson with a 47–10 thrashing in its home opener against last year's KCAC champion. Missouri Valley took the lead in the first quarter when Lorenzo Dennard completed 5 yard run for a touchdown and held the lead for the remainder of the game. Missouri Valley scored seven touchdowns: five on the ground, one by air, and one more on defense while accumulating 486 yards of total offense. McPherson could only manage one touchdown and 136 yards of total offense and could not convert a single third down situation in 14 attempts.

Local McPherson sportswriter Steve Sell noted before the game that McPherson's team was "full of unknowns" and noted that the more challenging opponent scheduled early in the season is different from previous years.

==== Peru State vs. #23 Baker ====
	1	2	3	4	Total
Peru State	6	0	6	0	**12**
**#23 Baker**	10	24	14	7	**55**

The Baker Wildcats advanced their record to 2–0 for the season by defeating Nebraska's Peru State 55–12 at Baldwin City. Baker accumulated 468 yards of total offense and held Peru State to 111. Baker scored a total of seven touchdowns, four by passing and three by rushing and picked off three interceptions on defense.

Baker's John Babb led the Wildcats on the ground with 129 yards on 11 carries and teammate Jake Morse added 183 yards in the air with three touchdowns.

=== Week 2 ===
Date	Time	Visiting team	Home team	Site	TV	Result	Attendance	Ref.
September 10, 2011	1:00 PM	**Peru State**	Culver-Stockton	Ellison Poulton Stadium • Canton, Missouri		58–27	-	
September 10, 2011	6:00 PM	Graceland	**Lindenwood**	Harlen C. Hunter Stadium • Saint Charles, Missouri		**L** 10–67	-	
September 10, 2011	6:00 PM	No. 3 MidAmerica Nazarene	No. 11 **Missouri Valley**	Gregg-Mitchell Field • Marshall, Missouri	Missouri Valley Sports Network	21–26	-	
September 10, 2011	6:00 PM	Avila	**Central Methodist**	Davis Field • Fayette, Missouri		0–30	-	
September 10, 2011	6:00 PM	No. 23 Baker	**Evangel**	JFK Stadium • Springfield, Missouri		27–34	-	
^{#}Rankings from NAIA Coaches' Poll. All times are in Central Time.

Only Graceland had a non-conference game in week two, which they lost to Lindenwood University. However, there were some exciting games as #11 Missouri Valley upset #3 MidAmerica Nazarene and unranked Evangel managed a win against #23 Baker. Benedictine did not play and thus remained unbeaten alongside Missouri Valley College.

==== Culver-Stockton vs. Peru State ====
	1	2	3	4	Total
Culver-Stockton	3	7	10	7	**27**
**Peru State**	14	10	17	17	**58**

Peru State scored twice in the first quarter and then held the lead for the remainder of the game. Included in the first quarter run was a 70-yard interception return by Peru State's Trey Rigby for a touchdown.

Peru State managed 497 yards of total offense, 25 first downs, and seven touchdowns while only committing two penalties the entire game. Culver-Stockton managed 384 yards of total offense, but could only get 18 first downs and three touchdowns, while committing six penalties for a total of 50 yards. The final score of the game was 58–27 with Peru State taking the victory.

==== Graceland vs. Lindenwood ====
	1	2	3	4	Total
Graceland	0	0	3	7	**10**
**Lindenwood**	27	7	7	26	**67**

Graceland traveled to former HAAC member and 2009 champion Lindenwood. Lindenwood took the lead early and big in the first quarter and at the half led by 34–0. Graceland managed a field goal in the third and touchdown in the fourth quarter, but gave up an additional 33 points in the process to end the game by score of 67–10.

==== MidAmerica Nazarene vs. Missouri Valley ====
	1	2	3	4	Total
#3 MidAmerica Nazarene	14	0	0	7	**21**
**#11 Missouri Valley**	7	10	9	0	**26**

MidAmerica Nazarene traveled to Missouri Valley for what was considered by many to be one of the most important games in conference play for the season. Coaches and sportswriters alike agreed that the winner of this game, only in week 2, would have the "inside edge" to the conference championship.

Although ranked eight spots lower in the NAIA Coaches' poll, Missouri Valley secured a win at home in a close matchup that ended with the final score 26–21. During the game, Missouri Valley managed five takeaways and a fourth-quarter goal line stance to seal the win.

==== Avila vs. Central Methodist ====
	1	2	3	4	Total
Avila	0	0	0	0	**0**
**Central Methodist**	3	7	13	7	**30**

Central Methodist achieved 404 yards of total offense and held Avila to 158 yards while scoring four touchdowns and holding Avila scoreless the entire game. James Cody Jr ran for two touchdowns including a 67-yard carry to score in the third quarter. Teammates James Harris and Justin Lowe each added a rushing touchdown and Ezequiel Rivera made a first quarter field goal plus three extra points to bring the score to 30–0 for a Central Methodist victory.

==== #23 Baker vs. Evangel ====
	1	2	3	4	Total
#23 Baker	3	11	3	10	**27**
**Evangel**	7	10	10	7	**34**

Nationally ranked Baker University managed to do nearly everything right on the field except win the game. Baker generated 480 yards of total offense compared to Evangel's 389, achieved 25 first downs compared to Evangel's 18, and converted 2 of 3 fourth-down conversions to Evangel's single failed attempt.

The strong statistical performance was outweighed by Baker scoring 27 points and Evangel scoring 34 to win. Evangel took the lead in the first quarter and maintained it through the entire game for the upset at home.

=== Week 3 ===
Date	Time	Visiting team	Home team	Site	TV	Result	Attendance	Ref.
September 17, 2011	12:00 PM	No. 7 **Missouri Valley**	Avila	Vincent P. Dasta Stadium • Kansas City, Missouri		0–49	–	
September 17, 2011	1:00 PM	Graceland	No. 14 **Benedictine**	Larry Wilcox Stadium • Atchison, Kansas		30–6	–	
September 17, 2011	1:00 PM	**Evangel**	Culver-Stockton	Dwight T. Reed Stadium • Jefferson City, Missouri		10–27	–	
September 17, 2011	6:00 PM	Central Methodist	**Baker**	Liston Stadium • Baldwin City, Kansas		31–7	–	
^{#}Rankings from NAIA Coaches' Poll. All times are in Central Time.

==== #7 Missouri Valley vs. Avila ====
	1	2	3	4	Total
**#7 Missouri Valley**	0	14	14	21	**49**
Avila	0	0	0	0	**0**

Missouri Valley put up 399 yards of total offense and seven touchdowns against Avila, who could only muster 112 yards of total offense and could not score the entire game. Avila did manage to keep Missouri Valley from scoring in the first quarter, but when Bruce Reyes pushed a 24-yard carry into the end zone with 7:56 on the clock in the second quarter, it was all Missouri Valley from there.

Missouri Valley ran up the score to a 49–0 victory over Avila, assisted by two fourth quarter defensive touchdowns. Gideon Lockett made a 39-yard interception return for a touchdown, and Daniel Gray recovered a fumble in the end zone for another.

==== Graceland vs. #14 Benedictine ====
	1	2	3	4	Total
Graceland	0	0	6	0	**6**
**#14 Benedictine**	7	14	2	7	**30**

Graceland managed one bright spot in their road game against #14 Benedictine when James Andrews picked up a blocked field goal attempt and ran it 75 yards for a touchdown. The rest of the game was dominated by Benedictine, scoring four touchdowns and a safety. Benedictine's offense produced 350 total yards where Graceland managed only 125.

Benedictine scored first when Jordan Jackson caught a 44-yard pass from Bill Noonan for a touchdown, and led the remainder of the game. The final score was 30–6.

==== Evangel vs. Culver-Stockton ====
	1	2	3	4	Total
**Evangel**	7	0	3	17	**27**
Culver-Stockton	0	3	7	0	**10**

A 17-point fourth quarter burst of scores helped Evangel lock the win against Culver-Stockton.

Evangel's Tommy Meyer started the scoring with a 39-yard run for a touchdown in the first quarter. Evangel held the lead until Culver-Stockton tied the score 10–10 with 35 seconds left in the third quarter when Jacob Harnacke completed a 2-yard run and Michael Camargo converted the extra point. From that point on, it was all in Evangel's hands, as scores came from Jesse Vaughn's 84 yard punt and Tyre Hemingway's 51 yard interception return. Drew O'Cain also contributed two extra points and a field goal to bring the final score to 27–10.

==== Central Methodist vs. Baker ====
	1	2	3	4	Total
Central Methodist	0	0	7	0	**7**
**Baker**	3	0	0	28	**31**

Baker's Andrew Kimrey made a 21-yard field goal in the first quarter for Baker to take the lead 3–0. No further scoring occurred until the third quarter, when Central Methodist's Caleb Haynes pushed a 1-yard run into the end zone, and Ezequiel Rivera tacked on the extra point to make the score 7–3.

Baker then scored four touchdowns in the fourth quarter: Kyle Rooks on a 2-yard run; Jake Green caught a 64-yard pass from Jake Morse; John Babb made a 57-yard run; and Jake Morse dove for 1 yard. Kicker Andrew Kimrey made every extra point, leaving the final score with a clear Baker victory 31–7.

=== Week 4 ===
Date	Time	Visiting team	Home team	Site	TV	Result	Attendance	Ref.
September 24, 2011	2:00 PM	No. 13 **Benedictine**	Peru State	Oak Bowl • Peru, Nebraska		21–47	–	
September 24, 2011	6:00 PM	Culver-Stockton	**Central Methodist**	Davis Field • Fayette, Missouri		42–5	–	
September 24, 2011	6:00 PM	Avila	No. 8 **MidAmerica Nazarene**	Pioneer Stadium • Olathe, Kansas		41–7	–	
September 24, 2011	6:00 PM	No. 22 Baker	No. 6 **Missouri Valley**	Gregg-Mitchell Field • Marshall, Missouri		38–7	–	
^{#}Rankings from NAIA Coaches' Poll. All times are in Central Time.

==== Avila vs. #8 MidAmerica Nazarene ====
	1	2	3	4	Total
Avila	0	7	0	0	**7**
**#8 MidAmerica Nazarene**	7	21	10	3	**41**

MidAmerica Nazarene started off the scoring when Juan Redmon caught a 10-yard pass from Sean Ransburg for a touchdown in the first quarter. Cody Morrow's extra point kick made the score 7–0. Avila responded in the second quarter when Da'Veion Sullivan made good on a 39-yard pass from Vincent Beltran for six points, and Tim Gilday's extra point tied the score 7–7.

MidAmerica Nazarene answered by scoring three touchdowns in the rest of the second quarter to make it 28–7 at halftime, and then dominated the second half. MidAmerica scored a total of five touchdowns through 511 yards of total offense while holding Avila to one touchdown and 240 offensive yards. The final score was 41–7.

==== #22 Baker vs. #6 Missouri Valley ====
	1	2	3	4	Total
#22 Baker	0	0	0	7	**7**
**#6 Missouri Valley**	7	14	7	10	**38**

Both Baker and Missouri Valley were ranked teams when met for conference play. Last week's game for Baker, they held their opponents to one touchdown for the win. This week, it was Baker's turn to be held to one touchdown for a loss.

Missouri Valley's offense achieved 487 total yards while Baker was only able to make 169. Missouri Valley's 30 first downs and five touchdowns far surpassed Baker's 11 first downs and one touchdown, leaving the final score 38–7.

=== Week 5 ===
Date	Time	Visiting team	Home team	Site	TV	Result	Attendance	Ref.
October 1, 2011	1:00 PM	**MidAmerica Nazarene**	Baker	Liston Stadium • Baldwin City, Kansas		30–33	–	
October 1, 2011	1:00 PM	Evangel	**Benedictine**	Larry Wilcox Stadium • Atchison, Kansas		38–0	–	
October 1, 2011	1:30 PM	No. 15 **Bethany**	Avila	Vincent P. Dasta Stadium • Kansas City, Missouri		**L** 13–30	–	
October 1, 2011	2:00 PM	Peru State	**Graceland**			45–13	–	
October 1, 2011	2:00 PM	**Missouri Valley**	Culver-Stockton	Dwight T. Reed Stadium • Jefferson City, Missouri		14–48	–	
^{#}Rankings from NAIA Coaches' Poll. All times are in Central Time.

==== #15 Bethany vs. Avila ====
	1	2	3	4	Total
**#15 Bethany**	7	3	13	7	**30**
Avila	3	0	0	10	**13**

Bethany out-paced Avila University in a game that statistically was closely matched between the two teams. Bethany put down 364 yards of total offense, compared to Avila's 331; Bethany had 21 first downs compared to Avila's 19; Bethany went 7 for 15 on third down conversions and Avila went 7 for 17; both teams were 0 for 1 on fourth down attempts. Each side lost a fumble, but Bethany gave up 2 interceptions where Avila had zero.

Despite the similarity of statistics, Bethany won by a score of 30 to 13.

=== Week 6 ===
Date	Time	Visiting team	Home team	Site	TV	Result	Attendance	Ref.
October 8, 2011	1:00 PM	**Baker**	Avila	Vincent P. Dasta Stadium • Kansas City, Missouri		20–37	–	
October 8, 2011	1:00 PM	**Trinity Bible College**	Peru State			5–31	–	
October 8, 2011	1:30 PM	Graceland	**Evangel**			27–21	–	
October 8, 2011	2:00 PM	**Benedictine**	Central Methodist			3–26	–	
October 8, 2011	6:00 PM	Culver-Stockton	**MidAmerica Nazarene**	Pioneer Stadium • Olathe, Kansas		60–14	–	
^{#}Rankings from NAIA Coaches' Poll. All times are in Central Time.

=== Week 7 ===
Date	Time	Visiting team	Home team	Site	TV	Result	Attendance	Ref.
October 15, 2011	1:00 PM	**Avila**	Culver-Stockton	Dwight T. Reed Stadium • Jefferson City, Missouri		13–27	–	
October 15, 2011	1:00 PM	Missouri Valley	**Benedictine**	Larry Wilcox Stadium • Atchison, Kansas		35–19	–	
October 15, 2011	1:00 PM	Evangel	**Peru State**			20–13	–	
October 15, 2011	2:00 PM	**Central Methodist**	Graceland			27–41	–	
October 15, 2011	2:00 PM	No. 15 Southern Nazarene	No. 7 **MidAmerica Nazarene**	Cessna Stadium • Wichita, Kansas		**W** 41–17	–	
^{#}Rankings from NAIA Coaches' Poll. All times are in Central Time.

==== #15 Southern Nazarene vs. #7 MidAmerica Nazarene ====
	1	2	3	4	Total
#15 Southern Nazarene	7	3	7	0	**17**
**#7 MidAmerica Nazarene**	10	21	7	3	**41**

MidAmerica Nazarene's Juan Redmon caught a 38-yard pass from Sean Ransburg for a touchdown and rolled to victory over Southern Nazarene at Cessna Stadium in Wichita, Kansas Southern did manage to tie up the score in the second quarter when Shawn Mingledorff kicked a 12-yard field goal to make the score 10–10, but just over five minutes later MidAmerica's Sean Ransburg completed a 7-yard run for a touchdown and the Pioneers held the lead for the remainder of the game. Southern's offense managed 275 total yards, where MidAmerica made 418. The final score was 17–41, with MidAmerica Nazarene the victors.

The two teams met again in the first round of the national championship playoffs.

=== Week 8 ===
Date	Time	Visiting team	Home team	Site	TV	Result	Attendance	Ref.
October 22, 2011	1:00 PM	Benedictine	**MidAmerica Nazarene**	Pioneer Stadium • Olathe, Kansas		49–39	–	
October 22, 2011	1:00 PM	Peru State	**Central Methodist**			34–10	–	
October 22, 2011	1:00 PM	Evangel	**Avila**			27–6	–	
October 22, 2011	2:00 PM	Graceland	**Missouri Valley**			78–0	–	
October 22, 2011	2:00 PM	Culver-Stockton	**Baker**	Baldwin City, Kansas		71–21	–	
^{#}Rankings from NAIA Coaches' Poll. All times are in Central Time.

=== Week 9 ===
Date	Time	Visiting team	Home team	Site	TV	Result	Attendance	Ref.
October 29, 2011		Avila	**Benedictine**			25–10	–	
October 29, 2011		**Missouri Valley**	Peru State			0–13	–	
October 29, 2011		Culver-Stockton	**Lindenwood**			70–24	–	
October 29, 2011		**Central Methodist**	Evangel			7–38	–	
October 29, 2011		**MidAmerica Nazarene**	Graceland			14–72	–	
^{#}Rankings from NAIA Coaches' Poll. All times are in Central Time.

=== Week 10 ===
Date	Time	Visiting team	Home team	Site	TV	Result	Attendance	Ref.
November 5, 2011	1:00 PM	Graceland	Avila			50–22	–	
November 5, 2011	1:00 PM	Peru State	MidAmerica Nazarene	Pioneer Stadium • Olathe, Kansas		24–8	–	
November 5, 2011	1:00 PM	Central Methodist	Southeast Missouri			55–44	–	
November 5, 2011	1:00 PM	Benedictine	Baker	Baldwin City, Kansas		10–7	–	
November 5, 2011	1:30 PM	Culver-Stockton	William Jewell			52–24	–	
November 5, 2011	1:30 PM	Evangel	Missouri Valley			52–24	–	
^{#}Rankings from NAIA Coaches' Poll. All times are in Central Time.

=== Week 11 ===
Date	Time	Visiting team	Home team	Site	TV	Result	Attendance	Ref.
November 12, 2011	1:00 PM	Culver-Stockton	**Benedictine**			69–10	–	
November 12, 2011	1:00 PM	**Missouri Valley**	Central Methodist	(Senior Day)		7–33	–	
November 12, 2011	1:00 PM	**Avila**	Peru State			23–26	–	
November 12, 2011	1:30 PM	**MidAmerica Nazarene**	Evangel			0–37	–	
November 12, 2011	2:00 PM	**Baker**	Graceland			14–50	–	
^{#}Rankings from NAIA Coaches' Poll. All times are in Central Time.

== Postseason ==
MidAmerica Nazarene, Missouri Valley, and Benedictine qualified to compete in the 2011 NAIA Football National Championship postseason tournament.

=== First round ===
Date	Time	Visiting team	Home team	Site	TV	Result	Attendance	Ref.
November 19, 2011	12:00 PM	No. 9 Saint Francis	No. 7 Missouri Valley	Gregg-Mitchell Field • Marshall, Missouri (NAIA Nationals First Round)		L 28–14	–	
November 19, 2011	1:00 PM	No. 14 Southern Nazarene	No. 4 MidAmerica Nazarene	Pioneer Stadium • Olathe, Kansas (NAIA Nationals First Round)		W 40–28	–	
November 19, 2011	1:30 PM	No. 3 Georgetown (KY)	No. 15 Benedictine	Larry Wilcox Stadium • Atchison, Kansas (NAIA Nationals First Round)		L 21–7	–	
^{#}Rankings from NAIA Coaches' Poll. All times are in Central Time.

==== #9 Saint Francis vs. #7 Missouri Valley ====
	1	2	3	4	Total
#9 Saint Francis	7	7	0	14	28
#7 Missouri Valley	7	0	7	0	14

Missouri Valley entered the first round with a record of 9–1 and as the champions of the Heart of America Athletic Conference. Saint Francis came with a record of 8–2 and has won eight-straight First Round games in previous years.

Saint Francis scored first and last in their first-round game against Missouri Valley, with a total of four touchdowns for the game. It was enough to record a win on the road by a score of 28–14.

==== #14 Southern Nazarene vs. #4 MidAmerica Nazarene ====
	1	2	3	4	Total
#14 Southern Nazarene	0	7	7	14	28
#4 MidAmerica Nazarene	13	7	7	13	40

MidAmerica Nazarene and Southern Nazarene began their national title hopes in the first round on November 19, 2011. Both teams met previously this season during week 7 on October 15. MidAmerica has a 5–8 record in postseason play and Southern Nazarene is in their first postseason game.

MidAmerica Nazarene took the lead in the first quarter when Sean Ransburg managed a 33-yard run for a touchdown and held the lead for the remainder of the game, including Kyle Cobb's 50 yard interception for a touchdown in the second quarter.

Southern Nazarene managed several scores along the way, including Jarod Martin catching a 64-yard pass from Brady Wardlaw for a touchdown.

==== #15 Benedictine vs. #3 Georgetown (KY) ====
	1	2	3	4	Total
#15 Benedictine	7	0	0	0	7
#3 Georgetown (KY)	7	7	0	7	21

Benedictine started quick when Nick Rudolph ran a 22-yard interception for a touchdown and the first score of the game after only 21 seconds had expired. His touchdown and Zach Keenan's extra point were the only scores for Benedictine while Georgetown managed three touchdowns.

After accumulating 366 yards of total offense and holding Benedictine to 278, Georgetown won the game—final score: 7–21.

=== Quarterfinals ===
Date	Time	Visiting team	Home team	Site	TV	Result	Attendance	Ref.
November 19, 2011	1:00 PM	No. 5 Saint Xavier	No. 4 MidAmerica Nazarene	Pioneer Stadium • Olathe, Kansas (NAIA National Quarterfinals)		L 14–29	–	
^{#}Rankings from NAIA Coaches' Poll. All times are in Central Time.

==== #5 Saint Xavier vs. #4 MidAmerica Nazarene ====
	1	2	3	4	Total
#5 Saint Xavier	6	7	0	16	29
#4 MidAmerica Nazarene	0	7	0	7	14

Saint Xavier's Wes Gastel caught a 9-yard pass from Jimmy Coy for six points in the first quarter to take the lead. His team held that until the fourth quarter when MidAmerica started to mount a comeback as Austin Conyers caught a 65-yard pass from Tyler Herl for a touchdown and MidAmerica took the lead by a score of 13–14. Less than a minute and a half later, Saint Xavier took the lead back and held it for the remainder of the game.

Saint Xavier posted on 408 yards of total offense and 22 first downs while holding MidAmerica Nazarene to just 281 yards and 12 first downs. Saint Xavier scored 16 points in the final quarter towards the final score of 29–14.
