= 2012 Heart of America Athletic Conference football season =

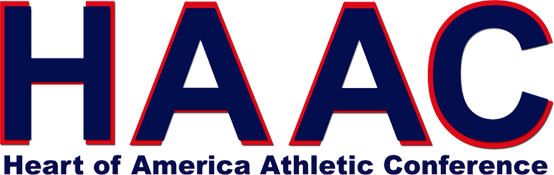
- League: NAIA
- Sport: football
- Duration: Fall-Winter 2012
- Teams: 10

Regular season

2012 NAIA Football National Championship
- champions: Missouri Valley Vikings
- runners-up: MidAmerica Nazarene Pioneers

Football seasons
- 2011 2013

2012 Heart of America Athletic Conference football standings
	Conf.			Overall
Team	W		L	W		L
No. 3 Missouri Valley $^	9	–	0	12	–	1
No. 12 MidAmerica Nazarene ^	8	–	1	8	–	3
No. 14 Baker ^	7	–	2	8	–	3
No. 23 Evangel	6	–	3	7	–	4
No. 22 Benedictine (KS)	5	–	4	7	–	4
Graceland	4	–	5	6	–	5
Peru State	3	–	6	5	–	6
Culver–Stockton	2*	–	7*	3*	–	8*
Avila	1*	–	8*	1*	–	10*
Central Methodist	0*	–	9*	0*	–	10*
$ – Conference champion; ^ – NAIA playoff participant *Central Methodist and Avila later forfeited their wins, giving Culver–Stockton two wins and Avila a win over Central Methodist.; Rankings from NAIA Coaches' Poll

The 2012 Heart of America Athletic Conference football season is made up of 10 United States college athletic programs that compete in the continental midwest Heart of America Athletic Conference (HAAC) under the National Association of Intercollegiate Athletics (NAIA) for the 2012 college football season.

== Conference teams and information ==
School	Mascot	Head coach	Location	Stadium
Avila	Eagles	Justin Berna	Kansas City, Missouri	Vincent P. Dasta Stadium
Baker	Wildcats	Mike Grossner	Baldwin City, Kansas	Liston Stadium
Benedictine	Ravens	Larry Wilcox	Atchison, Kansas	Larry Wilcox Stadium
Central Methodist	Eagles	Jody Ford	Fayette, Missouri	Davis Field
Culver-Stockton	Wildcats	Jeff Duvendeck	Canton, Missouri	Ellison Poulton Stadium
Evangel	Crusaders	Brenton Illum	Springfield, Missouri	JFK Stadium
Graceland	Yellowjackets	Jeff Douglas	Lamoni, Iowa	Huntsman Field
MidAmerica Nazarene	Pioneers	Jonathan Quinn	Olathe, Kansas	Pioneer Stadium
Missouri Valley	Vikings	Paul Troth	Marshall, Missouri	Gregg-Mitchell Field
Peru State	Bobcats	Steve Schneider	Peru, Nebraska	Oak Bowl

== Preseason outlook ==
Four teams in the conference begin holding national rankings in the 2012 Spring NAIA Coaches' Poll. MidAmerica Nazarene is ranked #5, Missouri Valley #9, Benedictine #11, and Baker #19.

The preseason coaches poll for the conference placed MidAmerica Nazarene at the top. Missouri Valley also received first place votes and ended up second in the pre-season poll.

Overall, the conference considered one of the strongest in the NAIA.

== Schedule and results ==
Schedule is subject to change.

Index to colors and formatting
HAAC member won
HAAC member lost
Winning team in **bold**

=== Week 0 ===
Date	Time	Visiting team	Home team	Site	TV	Result	Attendance	Ref.
August 25, 2012	4:00 PM	**Peru State**	Dakota State	Trojan Field • Madison, South Dakota		**W** 35–27	-	
August 25, 2012	6:00 PM	Graceland	No. 15 **Grand View**	Williams Stadium • Des Moines, Iowa		**L** 6–26	-	
August 25, 2012	6:00 PM	No. 13 **Benedictine**	Concordia (NE)	Bulldog Stadium • Seward, Nebraska		**W** 45–37	-	
August 25, 2012	6:00 PM	No. 18 **Baker**	No. 11 Ottawa	Peoples Bank Field • Ottawa, Kansas (NAIA Game of the Week)		**W** 27–20	-	
^{#}Rankings from NAIA Coaches' Poll. All times are in Central Time.

Four teams in the conference played this week, all outside the conference. Three teams won their games and one team lost, ending the week with a record of 3–1 against other conferences.

==== Peru State at Dakota State ====
	1	2	3	4	Total
**Peru State**	7	0	28	0	**35**
Dakota State	0	10	17	10	**37**

Last season, Peru State ended with a record of 2–8 and Dakota State finished 1–10.

Peru State first in the game as Ryan Ludlow rushed for a 66-yard touchdown and Levi Cockle added an extra point kick to give Bobcats a 7–0 lead with less than nine minutes remaining in the first quarter. Both teams combined offensively for 927 yards (492 for Peru State, 435 for Dakota State) and eight touchdowns—6 rushing and 2 passing. Neither team gave up a fumble but each side delivered one interception. The final score left Peru State the winner, 35–27.

==== Graceland at #15 Grand View ====
	1	2	3	4	Total
Graceland	0	3	0	3	**6**
**#15 Grand View**	3	7	6	10	**26**

Grand View began only their fifth season of college football ever with a #15 ranking and a home opener against Graceland. The Vikings capped off their fourth season in program history with a record of 8 wins and four losses, claimed their first Mid-States Football Association Midwest League title, and a trip to the 2011 NAIA Football National Championship playoffs.

Once the game got underway, Graceland could move the ball on offense but failed to put it in the end zone in their game against their in-state rival. Graceland's offense put on 318 yards of total offense and held Grand View to 234, but only could manage two field goals. Grand View gave up two fumbles and three interceptions, but still managed to come out on top by a score of 26–6.

==== #13 Benedictine at Concordia (NE) ====
	1	2	3	4	Total
**#13 Benedictine**	7	10	14	14	**45**
Concordia (NE)	6	10	7	14	**37**

Opposing team kickers Zach Keenan (Benedictine) and Kenny Zoeller (Concordia) combined to score 20 of the 82 points in this game.

Leading 9–7, Concordia fumbled in the end zone and Benedictine's Hayden Smith jumping on it for a touchdown and took a 14-9 lead.

Benedictine put on 407 yards in total offense and went 8–16 on third down, while Concordia managed 295 total offensive yards and 5–14 on third down attempts. The final score was a victory for Benedictine 49–36.

==== #18 Baker at #11 Ottawa ====
	1	2	3	4	Total
**#18 Baker**	3	3	7	14	**27**
#11 Ottawa	7	3	0	10	**20**

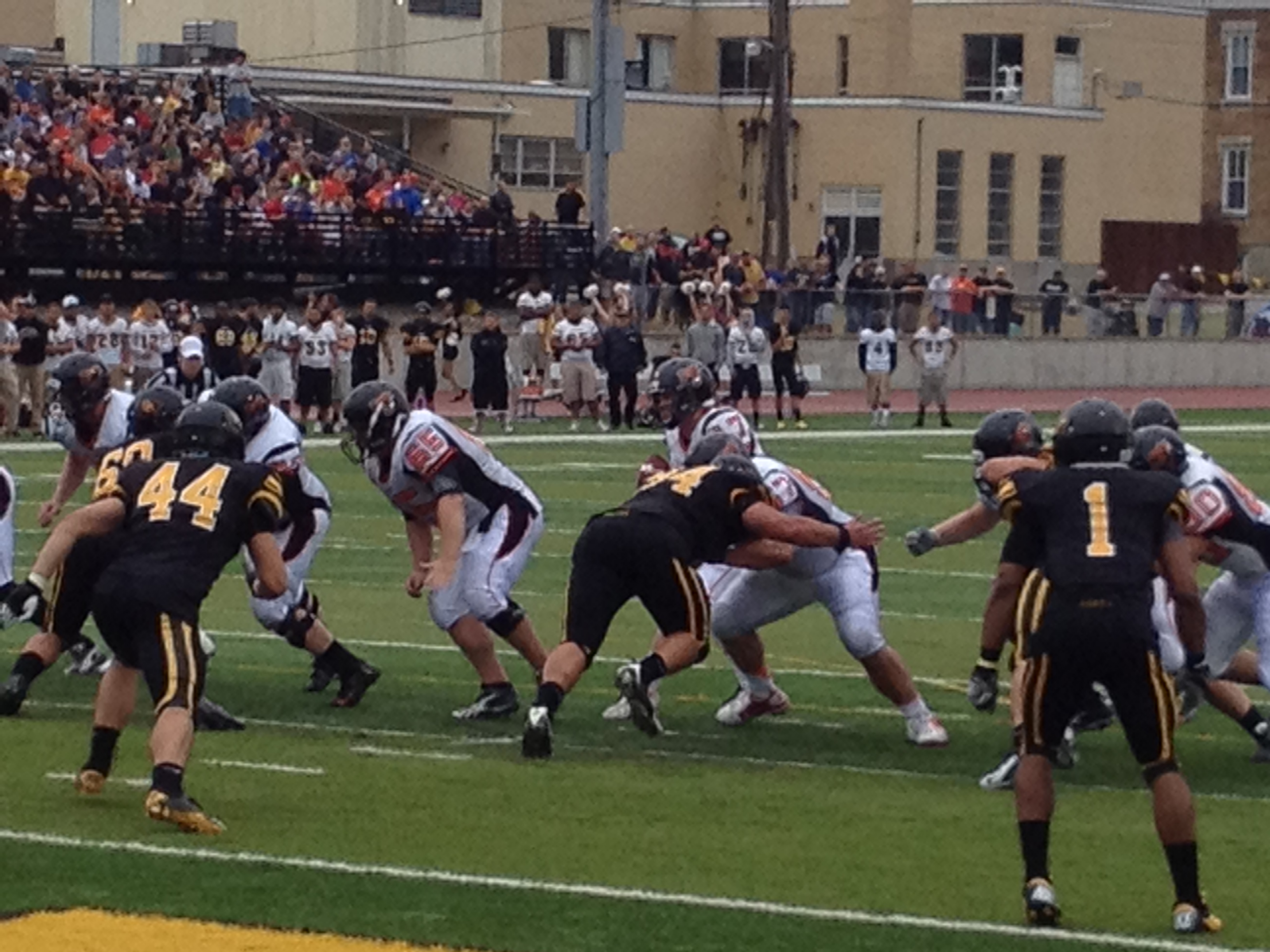
Baker's offense lines up against the Ottawa Braves on the way to their 27–20 victory.

Baker and Ottawa met in the season's first NAIA "Game of the Week" on August 25. This was the sixth time that both teams have met in their season opener, and the 81st meeting all-time for the two programs. Going into the game, Baker led the rivalry 45-33-2 including a 41-16 victory in 2011.

The Ottawa Braves of the Kansas Collegiate Athletic Conference began the game winning the conference two of the last three seasons and three consecutive post-season appearances. Baker brought five consecutive winning seasons and five rankings in the top 25 final poll.

When the game got under way, Baker scored first with a 12-yard field goal by Steven Stewart with 8:13 left in the first quarter, but not after losing starting quarterback Jake Morse to injury for the remainder of the game. With 4:45 left in the first, Ottawa answered back with a touchdown and kicked the extra point to make the score 7–3. One more field goal by each team put the score 10–6 at halftime.

In the fourth quarter, Baker took the score from tied up at 13–13 to a 27–13 lead by capitalizing on two turnovers. With 1:49 left to play, Ryder Werts fell on the ball in the end zone for a touchdown and kicker Steven Stewart made the extra point to put the Wildcats up by seven. Just 29 seconds later, Baker's Emmerson Clarke took a 48-yard interception return for a touchdown. Stewart's extra point put the score at 27–13. Ottawa managed a final touchdown with five seconds to go in the fourth quarter to put the final score at 27–20, with Baker recording the upset victory over the higher-ranked team.

Baker had two key players injured during and prior to the game. Morse's injury was somewhat of a repeat of the matchup in 2010, when he left the game due to a concussion. Just one week earlier, Junior Scott Meyer’s season ended from injury in a scrimmage game against Fort Scott Community College.

Ottawa began the game without offensive starter Matt Bollig, who suffered a career-ending injury during weightlifting practice in July.

=== Week 1 ===
Date	Time	Visiting team	Home team	Site	TV	Result	Attendance	Ref.
September 1, 2012	1:00 PM	Avila	**Lindenwood-Belleville**	Lindenwood Stadium • Belleville, Illinois (First game in Lindenwood program history)		**L** 37–43	-	
September 1, 2012	1:00 PM	No. 18 **Baker**	Peru State	Oak Bowl • Peru, Nebraska		34–13	-	
September 1, 2012	1:00 PM	Sterling	No. 13 **Benedictine**	Larry Wilcox Stadium • Atchison, Kansas (Football Alumni Day - Atchison Community Day)		**W** 6–59	-	
September 1, 2012	2:00 PM	Culver-Stockton	**Graceland**	Bruce Jenner Sports Complex • Lamoni, Iowa		17–28	-	
September 1, 2012	6:00 PM	No. 5 **MidAmerica Nazarene**	Central Methodist	Davis Field • Fayette, Missouri		34–14	-	
September 1, 2012	6:00 PM	No. 9 **Missouri Valley**	McPherson	McPherson Stadium • McPherson, Kansas		**W** 27–13	-	
September 1, 2012	6:00 PM	Friends	**Evangel**	JFK Stadium • Springfield, Missouri		**W** 14–27	-	
^{#}Rankings from NAIA Coaches' Poll. All times are in Central Time.

==== Avila at Lindenwood–Belleville ====
	1	2	3	4	Total
Avila	0	27	3	7	**37**
**Lindenwood-Belleville**	9	20	8	6	**43**

It was the first college football game of all time for the new Lindenwood University football team. The game was played on the newly renovated home stadium in Belleville, Illinois.

Lindenwood receiver Harvey Binford caught the first touchdown in school history. Teammates Dominick Sherman achieved 92 yards on 17 carries and Derrick Henry returned an 85-yard kickoff return for a touchdown.

Lindenwood dominated offensively with 589 total yards with six touchdowns and held Avila to 350 yards. Defensively, Lindenwood did allow Avila to score five touchdowns, but it was not enough for Avila and Lindenwood won its first game in its program's history by a score of 43–37.

==== #18 Baker at Peru State ====
	1	2	3	4	Total
**#18 Baker**	0	14	7	13	**34**
Peru State	0	0	6	7	**13**

Peru state finished last season with a record of 2 wins and 8 losses, but boasted 70 returning lettermen for the season. Baker entered the game ranked #18 and with one victory for the season against a strong Ottawa team.

Neither team scored in the first quarter. In the second quarter, Baker's Jermaine Broomfield scored a touchdown on a 3-yard run. Later in the same quarter, teammate Dillon Baxter and University of Southern California transfer student made a touchdown on a 6-yard run to take the lead 14–0. Baker led the remainder of the game and won 34–13.

==== Sterling at #13 Benedictine ====
	1	2	3	4	Total
Sterling	0	0	6	0	**6**
**#13 Benedictine**	21	17	7	14	**59**

The Benedictine Ravens played host to the Sterling Warriors and dominated every aspect of the game.

The Ravens achieved 429 yards in total offense with eight touchdowns while Sterling earned just 265 and one touchdown. Sterling lost four fumbles and another interception while only making good on 3 of 14 third down situations. Benedictine lost two fumbles and zero interceptions while converting 6 of 11 third downs. The final score was Benedictine 59, Sterling 6.

==== Culver-Stockton at Graceland ====
	1	2	3	4	Total
Culver-Stockton	7	0	3	7	**17**
**Graceland**	0	25	0	3	**28**

Culver-Stockton out-performed their opponent Gracelend three out of four quarters. It was not enough as Graceland capitalized on situations and mistakes that gave them enough to win the game. Among other key plays, Graceland's Andrew Gayles rushed for 74 yards for a touchdown and Graceland also scored on a 41-yard punt return and a fumble return.

Graceland earned 287 yards of offense and three touchdowns while holding Culver-Stockton to 197 yards and two touchdowns. Graceland's 25 points in the second quarter helped to secure the victory with a final score of 28–17.

==== #5 MidAmerica Nazarene at Central Methodist ====
	1	2	3	4	Total
**#5 MidAmerica Nazarene**	6	14	7	7	**34**
Central Methodist	7	0	0	7	**14**

New coach Jody Ford lost in his debut game when MidAmerica Nazarene capitalized on two turnovers to control the game. The Pioneers outgained the Eagles in total offense, 365-185.

Central Methodist scored first and held a 6–7 lead at the end of the first quarter against #5 MidAmerica Nazarene, but two unanswered touchdowns for the Pioneers turned the tide and the lead was lost for the remainder of the game0 The final score was 34–14.

==== #9 Missouri Valley at McPherson ====
	1	2	3	4	Total
**#9 Missouri Valley**	3	7	7	10	**27**
McPherson	0	6	7	0	**13**

The lead changed five times when #9 Missouri Valley traveled to play McPherson. Missouri Valley achieved 377 yards of total offense and three touchdowns while McPherson nearly matched with 376 yards but only two touchdowns. McPherson was intercepted twice where Missouri Valley was not, but McPherson only committed one penalty to Missouri Valley's seven. In the end, Missouri Valley claimed victory 27–13.

==== Friends at Evangel ====
	1	2	3	4	Total
Friends	0	0	7	7	**14**
**Evangel**	7	7	3	10	**27**

Evangel began its season opener against Friends looking to bounce back from last season's record of 3–7, depending on their more experienced players such as pre-season second team all-American linebacker Tabor Cheo.

Evangel's Jesse Vaughn caught a 31-yard pass from Andrew Brimhal for a touchdown in the first quarter to take the lead and Evangel held the lead for the remainder of the game. Evangel's offense out-produced Friends 419 yards to 374, with three touchdowns to two by the Falcons. The final score was Friends 14, Evangel 27.

=== Week 2 ===
Date	Time	Visiting team	Home team	Site	TV	Result	Attendance	Ref.
September 8, 2012	1:00 PM	**Central Methodist**	Avila	Vincent P. Dasta Stadium • Kansas City, Missouri		28–20	-	
September 8, 2012	1:00 PM	**Peru State**	Culver-Stockton	Ellison Poulton Stadium • Canton, Missouri		48–21	-	
September 8, 2012	1:00 PM	**Graceland**	Briar Cliff	Faber Field • Sioux City, Iowa		**W** 24–17	-	
September 8, 2012	6:00 PM	No. 9 **Missouri Valley**	No. 5 MidAmerica Nazarene	Pioneer Stadium • Olathe, Kansas		41–7	-	
September 8, 2012	6:00 PM	Evangel	No. 18 **Baker**	Liston Stadium • Baldwin City, Kansas		17–48	-	
^{#}Rankings from NAIA Coaches' Poll. All times are in Central Time.

=== Week 3 ===
Date	Time	Visiting team	Home team	Site	TV	Result	Attendance	Ref.
September 15, 2012	2:00 PM	No. 6 **Benedictine**	Graceland	Bruce Jenner Sports Complex • Lamoni, Iowa		48–0	-	
September 15, 2012	6:00 PM	Culver-Stockton	**Evangel**	JFK Stadium • Springfield, Missouri		23–45	-	
September 15, 2012	6:00 PM	Avila	No. 5 **Missouri Valley**	Gregg-Mitchell Field • Marshall, Missouri		6–55	-	
September 15, 2012	6:00 PM	No. 10 **Baker**	Central Methodist	Davis Field • Fayette, Missouri		24–14	-	
^{#}Rankings from NAIA Coaches' Poll. All times are in Central Time.

=== Week 4 ===
Date	Time	Visiting team	Home team	Site	TV	Result	Attendance	Ref.
September 22, 2012	12:00 PM	No. 13 **MidAmerica Nazarene**	Avila	Vincent P. Dasta Stadium • Kansas City, Missouri		38–9	-	
September 22, 2012	1:00 PM	**Central Methodist**	Culver-Stockton	Ellison Poulton Stadium • Canton, Missouri		32–7	-	
September 22, 2012	1:00 PM	Peru State	No. 6 **Benedictine**	Larry Wilcox Stadium • Atchison, Kansas		7–49	-	
September 22, 2012	6:00 PM	No. 5 **Missouri Valley**	No. 9 Baker	Liston Stadium • Baldwin City, Kansas		31–17	-	
September 22, 2012	6:00 PM	Evangel	**Nicholls State**	Guidry Stadium • Thibodaux, Louisiana (Hall of Fame Game)		**L** 17–73	-	
^{#}Rankings from NAIA Coaches' Poll. All times are in Central Time.

=== Week 5 ===
Date	Time	Visiting team	Home team	Site	TV	Result	Attendance	Ref.
September 29, 2012	1:00 PM	Central Methodist	**Lindenwood-Belleville**	Lindenwood Stadium • Belleville, Illinois		**L** 20–23	-	
September 29, 2012	1:30 PM	Culver-Stockton	No. 9 **Missouri Valley**	Gregg-Mitchell Field • Marshall, Missouri		7–47	-	
September 29, 2012	2:00 PM	Avila	**Bethany**	Lindstrom Field • Lindsborg, Kansas		**L** 1–0 forfeit	-	
September 29, 2012	2:00 PM	**Graceland**	Peru State	Oak Bowl • Peru, Nebraska		28–20	-	
September 29, 2012	6:00 PM	No. 13 Baker	No. 11 **MidAmerica Nazarene**	Pioneer Stadium • Olathe, Kansas		20–49	-	
September 29, 2012	6:00 PM	No. 6 Benedictine	**Evangel**	JFK Stadium • Springfield, Missouri		44–54	-	
^{#}Rankings from NAIA Coaches' Poll. All times are in Central Time.

==== Avila vs. Bethany ====
Avila and Bethany played their game as scheduled and Avila outscored Bethany by a score of 35–19. Avila would later forfeit the victory due to the use of an ineligible player.

=== Week 6 ===
Date	Time	Visiting team	Home team	Site	TV	Result	Attendance	Ref.
October 6, 2012	1:00 PM	No. 10 **MidAmerica Nazarene**	Culver-Stockton	Ellison Poulton Stadium • Canton, Missouri		63–3	-	
October 6, 2012	1:00 PM	Central Methodist	No. 12 **Benedictine**	Larry Wilcox Stadium • Atchison, Kansas		14–21	-	
October 6, 2012	1:00 PM	Trinity Bible	**Peru State**	Oak Bowl • Peru, Nebraska		**W** 21–47	-	
October 6, 2012	2:00 PM	Avila	No. 19 Baker	Liston Stadium • Baldwin City, Kansas		–	-	
October 6, 2012	2:00 PM	**Evangel**	Graceland	Bruce Jenner Sports Complex • Lamoni, Iowa		35–14	-	
^{#}Rankings from NAIA Coaches' Poll. All times are in Central Time.

=== Week 7 ===
Date	Time	Visiting team	Home team	Site	TV	Result	Attendance	Ref.
October 13, 2012	1:00 PM	Culver-Stockton	**Avila**	Vincent P. Dasta Stadium • Kansas City, Missouri		29–67	-	
October 13, 2012	1:30 PM	Peru State	No. 21 **Evangel**	JFK Stadium • Springfield, Missouri		23–38	-	
October 13, 2012	2:00 PM	**Graceland**	Central Methodist	Davis Field • Fayette, Missouri		17–14	-	
October 13, 2012	2:00 PM	No. 12 Benedictine	No. 3 **Missouri Valley**	Gregg-Mitchell Field • Marshall, Missouri		26–42	-	
October 13, 2012	5:00 PM	No. 10 MidAmerica Nazarene	**Gardner-Webb**	Ernest W. Spangler Stadium • Boiling Springs, North Carolina		**L** 28–30	-	
^{#}Rankings from NAIA Coaches' Poll. All times are in Central Time.

=== Week 8 ===
Date	Time	Visiting team	Home team	Site	TV	Result	Attendance	Ref.
October 20, 2012	1:00 PM	No. 13 **MidAmerica Nazarene**	No. 16 Benedictine	Larry Wilcox Stadium • Atchison, Kansas		28–17	-	
October 20, 2012	1:00 PM	Central Methodist	**Peru State**	Oak Bowl • Peru, Nebraska (Senior Day)		23–40	-	
October 20, 2012	1:00 PM	Lindenwood-Belleville	**Culver-Stockton**	Ellison Poulton Stadium • Canton, Missouri		**W** 14–21	-	
October 20, 2012	1:30 PM	Avila	No. 17 **Evangel**	JFK Stadium • Springfield, Missouri		21–54	-	
October 20, 2012	2:00 PM	No. 3 **Missouri Valley**	Graceland	Bruce Jenner Sports Complex • Lamoni, Iowa		39–7	-	
^{#}Rankings from NAIA Coaches' Poll. All times are in Central Time.

=== Week 9 ===
Date	Time	Visiting team	Home team	Site	TV	Result	Attendance	Ref.
October 27, 2012	1:00 PM	No. 12 **Benedictine**	Avila	Vincent P. Dasta Stadium • Kansas City, Missouri		45–42	-	
October 27, 2012	1:00 PM	No. 21 **Evangel**	Central Methodist	Davis Field • Fayette, Missouri		49–16	-	
October 27, 2012	1:00 PM	Peru State	No. 3 **Missouri Valley**	Gregg-Mitchell Field • Marshall, Missouri		13–67	-	
October 27, 2012	2:00 PM	Graceland	No. 10 **MidAmerica Nazarene**	Pioneer Stadium • Olathe, Kansas		0–55	-	
October 27, 2012	2:00 PM	No. 18 **Baker**	Culver-Stockton	Ellison Poulton Stadium • Canton, Missouri		29–9	-	
^{#}Rankings from NAIA Coaches' Poll. All times are in Central Time.

=== Week 10 ===
Date	Time	Visiting team	Home team	Site	TV	Result	Attendance	Ref.
November 3, 2012	1:00 PM	No. 12 **MidAmerica Nazarene**	Peru State	Nebraska City High School • Nebraska City, Nebraska		38–28	-	
November 3, 2012	1:00 PM	Culver-Stockton	**Austin Peay**	Governors Stadium • Clarksville, Tennessee		**L** 0–56	-	
November 3, 2012	1:00 PM	No. 13 **Baker**	No. 18 Benedictine	Larry Wilcox Stadium • Atchison, Kansas		38–28	-	
November 3, 2012	1:30 PM	No. 3 **Missouri Valley**	No. 15 Evangel	JFK Stadium • Springfield, Missouri		35–21	-	
November 3, 2012	2:00 PM	Avila	**Graceland**	Bruce Jenner Sports Complex • Lamoni, Iowa (Senior Day)		20–26	-	
^{#}Rankings from NAIA Coaches' Poll. All times are in Central Time.

==== #3 Missouri Valley vs. Evangel ====
Missouri Valley allowed unranked Evangel to gain a 14–0 lead, but managed to score in just eleven plays when Sophomore Quarterback Bruce Reyes carried the ball 11 yards for a touchdown.

=== Week 11 ===
Date	Time	Visiting team	Home team	Site	TV	Result	Attendance	Ref.
November 10, 2012	1:00 PM	**Peru State**	Avila	Vincent P. Dasta Stadium • Kansas City, Missouri		31–24 ^{1OT}	-	
November 10, 2012	1:00 PM	No. 19 Evangel	No. 11 **MidAmerica Nazarene**	Pioneer Stadium • Olathe, Kansas		3–56	-	
November 10, 2012	1:00 PM	No. 25 **Benedictine**	Culver-Stockton	Ellison Poulton Stadium • Canton, Missouri		34–7	-	
November 10, 2012	1:00 PM	Graceland	No. 19 **Baker**	Liston Stadium • Baldwin City, Kansas		7–40	-	
November 10, 2012	1:30 PM	Central Methodist	No. 2 **Missouri Valley**	Gregg-Mitchell Field • Marshall, Missouri		21–56	-	
^{#}Rankings from NAIA Coaches' Poll. All times are in Central Time.

== Postseason ==
Three teams from the conference qualified for the 2012 NAIA Football National Championship. Missouri Valley, MidAmerica Nazarene, and Baker all competed in the first round.

=== First round ===
Date	Time	Visiting team	Home team	Site	TV	Result	Attendance	Ref.
November 17, 2012	12:00 AM	No. 15 Ottawa	No. 2 Missouri Valley	Gregg-Mitchell Field • Marshall, Missouri (NAIA FCS First Round)		W 24–42	-	
November 17, 2012	12:00 PM	No. 9 MidAmerica Nazarene	No. 7 Cumberlands (KY)	James H. Taylor II Stadium • Williamsburg, Kentucky (NAIA FCS First Round)		L 24–42	-	
November 17, 2012	12:00 PM	No. 11 Baker	No. 6 Saint Francis (IN)	Bishop D'Arcy Stadium • Fort Wayne, Indiana (NAIA FCS First Round)		L 17–22	-	
^{#}Rankings from NAIA Coaches' Poll. All times are in Central Time.

==== #15 Ottawa (KS) at #2 Missouri Valley ====
	1	2	3	4	Total
#15 Ottawa (KS)	0	7	7	7	21
#2 Missouri Valley	15	15	7	19	56

Missouri Valley finished the regular season with its third consecutive conference championship and an undefeated 10–0 record, while Ottawa entered into the game with its second consecutive conference championship and a record of 8–2. Missouri Valley earned the home field advantage for the first round.

Missouri Valley scored 15 points in the first quarter and held Ottawa to zero, and held that lead for the entire game. Missouri Valley averaged 6.9 yards per play while holding Ottawa to 2.7. Missouri Valley's 487 total yards was made up of 229 yards rushing and 258 passing. With 13:46 left in the second quarter, Ottawa scored and managed to bring the score within eight points, but Missouri Valley pulled further away to a victorious final score of 56–21.

=== Quarterfinals ===
Date	Time	Visiting team	Home team	Site	TV	Result	Attendance	Ref.
November 24, 2012	1:00 PM	No. 18 Bethel (TN)	No. 2 Missouri Valley	Gregg-Mitchell Field • Marshall, Missouri (NAIA FCS Quarterfinals)		W 7–10	-	
^{#}Rankings from NAIA Coaches' Poll. All times are in Central Time.

=== Semifinals ===
Date	Time	Visiting team	Home team	Site	TV	Result	Attendance	Ref.
December 1, 2012		Marian (IN)	No. 2 Missouri Valley	Gregg-Mitchell Field • Marshall, Missouri (NAIA FCS Semifinals)		L 20–17	-	
^{#}Rankings from NAIA Coaches' Poll. All times are in Central Time.
