= First Down Classic =

Defunct college football bowl

First Down Classic (defunct)
- Previous stadiums: Pirate Stadium (2007–2009); Peoples Bank Field (2010); Liston Stadium (2011)
- Previous locations: Platte City, Missouri (2007–2009); Ottawa, Kansas (2010); Baldwin City, Kansas (2011)
- Operated: 2007–2011
- Championship affiliation: NAIA (2007–2011)
- Previous conference tie-ins: GSAC (2007); HAAC (2007–2008, 2010–2011); GPAC (2008–2009); AMC (2009); KCAC (2009–2011)
- Preceded by: Wheat Bowl (1995–2006)

Sponsors
- Victory Sports Network (2007–2011)

Former names
- College Fanz First Down Classic (2010)

2011 season matchup
- Baker vs. Ottawa (41–17)

The First Down Classic was a National Association of Intercollegiate Athletics endorsed Pre-Season bowl game created by Jason Dannelly of the Victory Sports Network. It began operations in 2007, taking over for the defunct Wheat Bowl that operated from 1995 until 2006. In 2009, two separate games were played under the same name "First Down Classic". The game ceased operations after completion of the 2011 game.

== Game results ==
Date	Winning Team		Losing Team		Location
August 25, 2007	No. 17 MidAmerica Nazarene Pioneers	59	Azusa Pacific Cougars	38	Platte City, Missouri
August 30, 2008	Doane Tigers	15	William Jewell Cardinals	13	Platte City, Missouri
August 29, 2009	Avila Eagles	9	Doane Tigers	6	Platte City, Missouri
August 29, 2009	No. 22 Ottawa Braves	31	McKendree Bearcats	21	Platte City, Missouri
August 28, 2010	No. 9 Ottawa Braves	24	No. 24 Baker Wildcats	14	Ottawa, Kansas
August 27, 2011	No. 23 Baker Wildcats	41	No. 10 Ottawa Braves	16	Baldwin City, Kansas

Rankings are from the NAIA Coaches' Poll.

== Game details ==
=== 2010 ===
	1	2	3	4	Total
Baker	0	0	0	14	14
Ottawa	7	0	7	10	24

The start of the 2010 NAIA football season began at Ottawa University in the College Fanz First Down Classic game between Ottawa and Baker. This game marked the first time the two schools met in football for 17 years. Ottawa began the game by returning the kickoff for a touchdown and led the entire game to a 24–14 victory.

=== 2011 ===
	1	2	3	4	Total
#10 Ottawa	13	4	0	0	17
#23 Baker	14	3	10	14	41

Nationally ranked at #23, Baker University upset #10 ranked Ottawa University in the 2011 match-up played at Liston Stadium in Baldwin City, Kansas. Ottawa scored first when Shane Gimzo completed a 9-yard run for a touchdown with 9:02 remaining in the first quarter. It was the only lead Ottawa would hold for the entire game, which they lost when Baker's Tyler Hatcher ran the kickoff return for 82 yards for a touchdown and Andrew Kimrey completed the PAT kick. Later that same quarter, Baker's Reggie Harris ran a 62-yard punt return for a touchdown to take the lead.

Ottawa managed to get close several times with the score at the end of the first half with Baker leading 16–17.

Baker managed to hold Ottawa scoreless in the second half of play while scoring three touchdowns and a field goal. Baker recovered two fumbles and intercepted three passes to win with a final score of 41–16.

Baker Running Back John Babb was named the game's Offensive MVP with 102 rushing yards on 10 attempts, 1 reception for 11 yards, and a Touchdown. Baker Outside Linebacker Adam Steele was named Defensive MVP with 16 tackles (7 Unassisted), 2 Interceptions and One Tackle for Loss.
