= All-American Bowl Player of the Year =

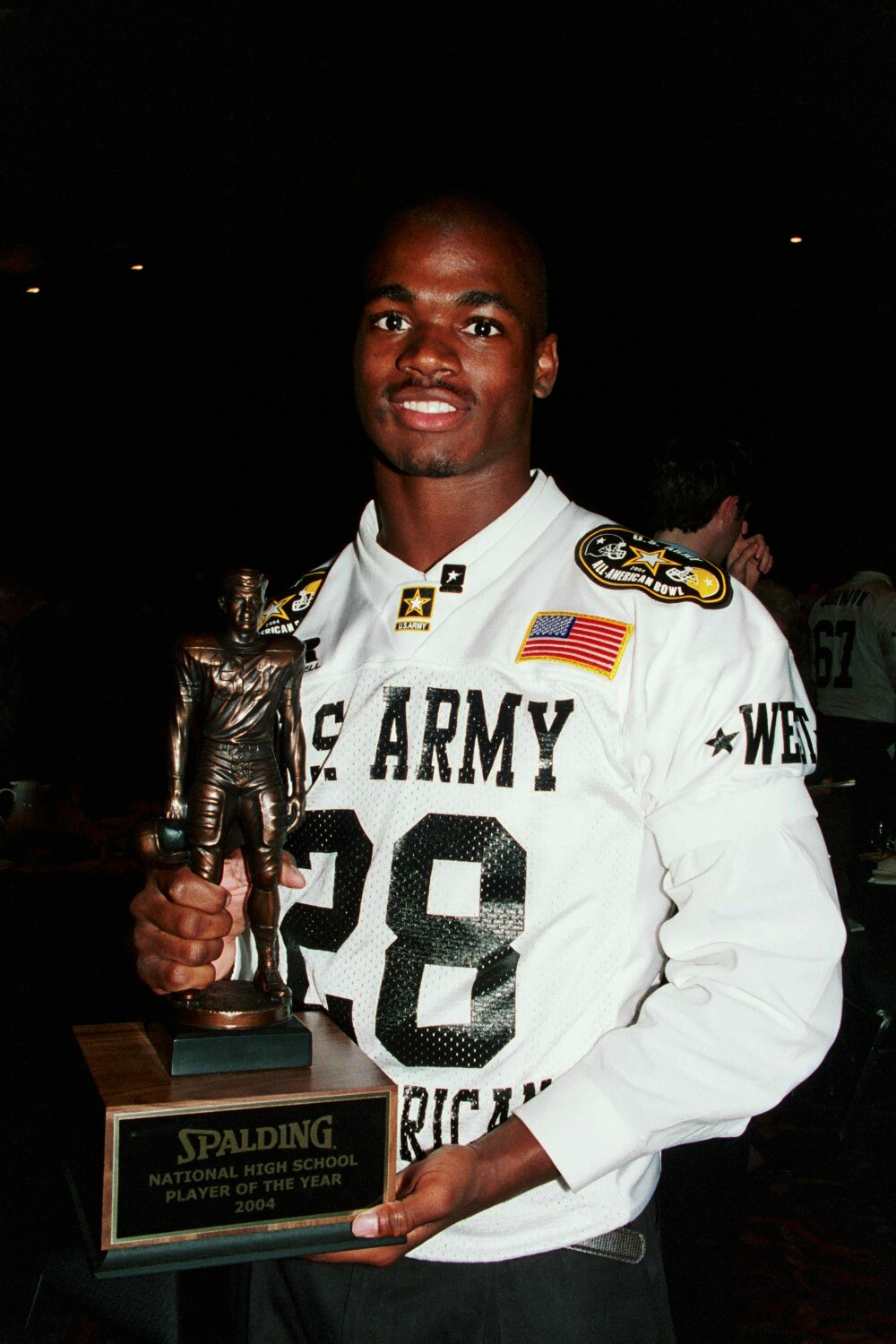
2004 U.S. Army All-American Bowl running back Adrian Peterson, awarded the 2003 Hall Trophy as the U.S. Army National Player of the Year

The All-American Bowl Player of the Year award (formerly known as the Hall Trophy and U.S. Army Player of the Year award) has been awarded annually since 2000 to the most outstanding high school football player in the United States, comparable to the Heisman Trophy for collegiate football players. The award is named after Ken Hall, nicknamed the "Sugarland Express", who was the all-time leading rusher in high school football history for 59 years (11,232 yards). The trophy is cast in the likeness of Hall in his 1950s uniform. The trophy presentation takes place after the high school season at a formal dinner on the evening before the All-American Bowl.

== Past winners ==
Season	Player	Position	High school	City	College	NFL team(s)
2000	Kevin Jones	RB	Cardinal O'Hara High School	Springfield, Pennsylvania	Virginia Tech	Detroit Lions, Chicago Bears
2001	Lorenzo Booker	RB	St. Bonaventure High School	Ventura, California	Florida State	Miami Dolphins, Philadelphia Eagles, Minnesota Vikings, Chicago Bears
2002	Chris Leak	QB	Independence High School	Charlotte, North Carolina	Florida	Chicago Bears
2003	Adrian Peterson	RB	Palestine High School	Palestine, Texas	Oklahoma	Minnesota Vikings, New Orleans Saints, Arizona Cardinals, Washington Redskins, Detroit Lions
2004	Ryan Perrilloux	QB	East St. John High School	Reserve, Louisiana	LSU/Jacksonville State	New York Giants
2005	Mitch Mustain	QB	Springdale High School	Springdale, Arkansas	Arkansas/USC	none
2006	Jimmy Clausen	QB	Oaks Christian High School	Westlake Village, California	Notre Dame	Carolina Panthers, Chicago Bears, Baltimore Ravens
2007	Terrelle Pryor	QB	Jeannette Senior High School	Jeannette, Pennsylvania	Ohio State	Oakland Raiders, Seattle Seahawks, Kansas City Chiefs, Cincinnati Bengals, Cleveland Browns, Washington Redskins, New York Jets, Buffalo Bills, Jacksonville Jaguars
2008	Bryce Brown	RB	Wichita High School East	Wichita, Kansas	Tennessee/Kansas State	Philadelphia Eagles, Buffalo Bills, Seattle Seahawks
2009	Dillon Baxter	RB	Mission Bay Senior High School	San Diego, California	Baker	none
2010	Demetrius Hart	RB	Dr. Phillips High School	Orlando, Florida	Alabama/Colorado State	none
2011	Dorial Green-Beckham	WR	Hillcrest High School	Springfield, Missouri	Missouri	Tennessee Titans, Philadelphia Eagles
2012	Max Browne	QB	Skyline High School	Sammamish, Washington	USC/Pittsburgh	none
2013	Elijah Hood	RB	Charlotte Catholic High School	Charlotte, North Carolina	North Carolina	Oakland Raiders
2014	Martez Ivey	OT	Apopka High School	Apopka, Florida	Florida	New England Patriots, Carolina Panthers
2015	Jacob Eason	QB	Lake Stevens High School	Lake Stevens, Washington	Georgia/Washington	Indianapolis Colts, Seattle Seahawks, Carolina Panthers
2016	Cam Akers	RB	Clinton High School	Clinton, Mississippi	Florida State	Los Angeles Rams, Minnesota Vikings, Houston Texans, New Orleans Saints, Seattle Seahawks
2017	Trevor Lawrence	QB	Cartersville High School	Cartersville, Georgia	Clemson	Jacksonville Jaguars
2018	Bru McCoy	WR/LB	Mater Dei	Santa Ana, California	USC/Tennessee	none
2019	Bryce Young	QB	Mater Dei	Santa Ana, California	Alabama	Carolina Panthers
2020	Cooper DeJean	DB	Battle Creek–Ida Grove High School	Ida Grove, Iowa	Iowa	Philadelphia Eagles
2021	Cade Klubnik	QB	Westlake High School	Austin, Texas	Clemson	
2022	Caleb Downs	DB	Mill Creek High School	Hoschton, Georgia	Alabama/Ohio State	
2023	Jeremiah Smith	WR	Chaminade-Madonna College Preparatory School	Hollywood, Florida	Ohio State	
2024	Alvin Henderson	RB	Elba High School	Elba, Alabama	Auburn	
2025	Matt Sieg	QB/DB	Fort Cherry High School	McDonald, Pennsylvania	West Virginia	
