= Lindenwood Stadium =

Stadium in Belleville, Illinois

- "The nation’s most original (hideous) football field"
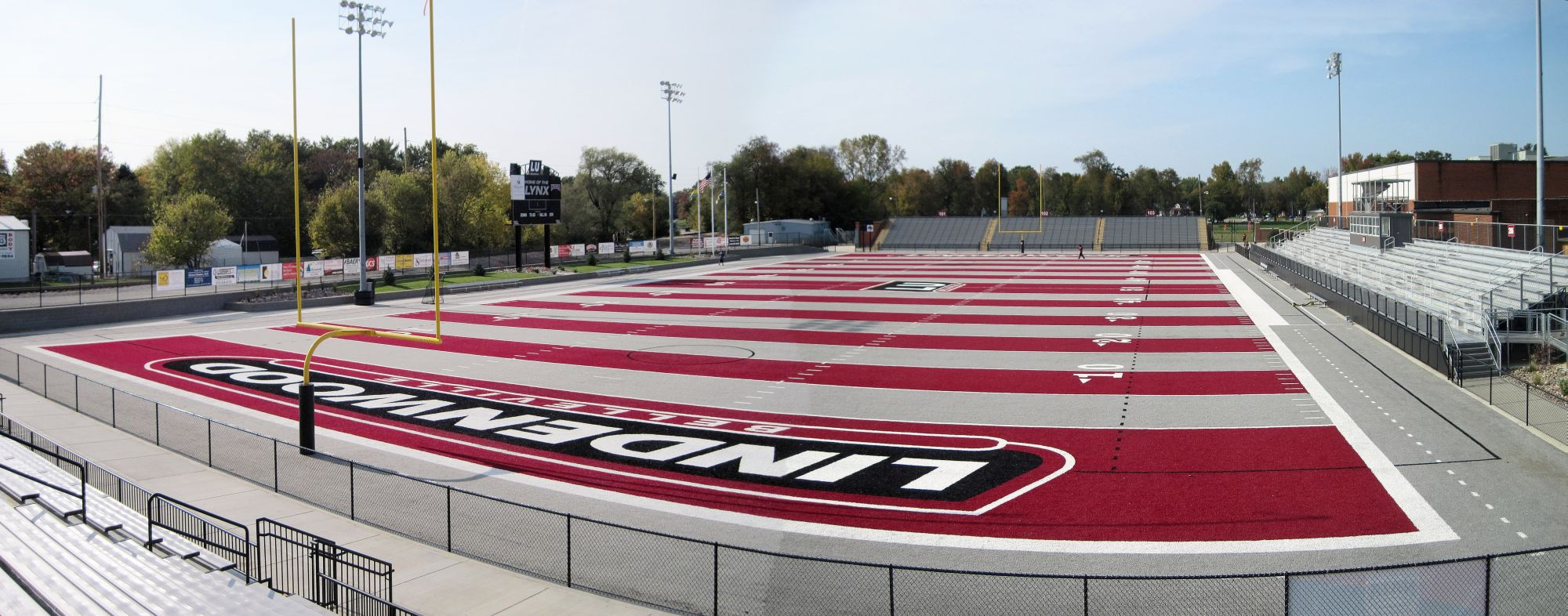
- Interactive map of Lindenwood Stadium
- Location: Belleville, Illinois
- Coordinates: 38.52254°N 90.01221°W
- Owner: City of Belleville
- Operator: Southwestern Illinois College
- Surface: EnviroTurf

Construction
- Opened: 1930s
- Cost: $2.3 million (2012 renovation)

Tenants
- Belleville Township/Belleville West Maroons (1930s–2002); Althoff Crusaders (through 2016); Lindenwood Lynx (2012–2019)

Lindenwood Stadium is a sports stadium in Belleville, Illinois. Before Lindenwood University closed its Belleville campus in 2020, the stadium was primarily used by the athletic teams of that campus.

The stadium was built on what was then the campus of Belleville Township High School as a Works Progress Administration project in the 1930s during the Great Depression. When the Belleville high school district opened a second school in the 1960s, the campus and stadium were inherited by the current Belleville High School-West. That school continued to use the stadium until it opened a new campus in 2003; the district sold the old campus to Lindenwood University soon after.

During the last years of its ownership by Lindenwood, the turf was not the normal selection of green, but was instead alternating red and gray. It has been called "The nation’s most original (hideous) football field." As of the 2012 season, Lindenwood was only one of four programs to have the field color other than the traditional green and the only NAIA school to do so. The first college football game played at the stadium was a 43–37 victory over the Avila Eagles on September 1, 2012. The local Althoff Catholic High School also used the field for football games until opening its own stadium for the 2017 season.

After Lindenwood closed its Belleville campus in 2020, it sold the campus to the city of Belleville. In 2023, by which time the city had contracted with Southwestern Illinois College, a local community college, to manage the campus, the red and gray striped field was replaced by one striped in two different shades of green.

The stadium is also used for other community events.

== See also ==
- List of college football stadiums with non-traditional field colors
