= Lindenwood University – Belleville =

Defunct satellite campus in Belleville, Illinois, U.S.

The Belleville Learning Center, previously known as Lindenwood University–Belleville and Lindenwood Belleville, is a defunct satellite campus of Lindenwood University. It offered evening postgraduate and undergraduate classes for about 300 students. Belleville Learning Center is located in Belleville, Illinois, and occupies the former campus of Belleville West High School. Beginning in 2009, Lindenwood University–Belleville offered traditional four-year undergraduate programs and the school gained independent accreditation in 2011, becoming a member of the Lindenwood University system and functioning as a sister-school to Lindenwood University. The undergraduate program was discontinued in 2020 and the Belleville Learning Center returned to its status as a satellite campus of Lindenwood University.

In October 2021, it was announced the City of Belleville would buy the property of the shuttered learning center.

== History ==
As a result of key partnership agreements and state approval in 2003, Lindenwood University purchased the abandoned former campus of the Belleville West High School with original architecture dating back to 1925 by William B. Ittner. Lindenwood-Belleville began by launching a master of arts programs in education and educational administration. Other programs were added through the university's School of Accelerated Degree Programs, an evening-based accelerated format designed for working adults and non-traditional students. The cost of the campus was $1. Belleville Township High School District 201 had operated the building. The university was required to spend funds to improve the property in order to qualify for the $1 price.

As part of a campus restoration campaign, Lindenwood invested $19 million by 2010. The plan included restoration of the auditorium and updating several historic buildings on campus and surrounding properties for academic and administrative use. When it opened in the fall of 2009, the Belleville campus was the only Lindenwood satellite campus to offer daytime classes.

For the 2009–2010 academic year, semester-based programs were only offered to junior- and senior-level students, but in the fall of 2010 the university expanded semester-based programs to all underclassmen. In 2011, Lindenwood University-Belleville transitioned from a satellite campus to a separately accredited college. The university was notified of the accrediting decision in November 2011 by the Higher Learning Commission of the North Central Association of Colleges and Schools. Under the new accreditation, Lindenwood University-Belleville kept the same name and the same governing board as the Lindenwood University campus in St. Charles, Missouri, and was considered a sister school as one part of the Lindenwood University System.

Citing "ongoing financial and enrollment challenges", Lindenwood University's Belleville sister school discontinued its semester-based undergraduate programs after the 2019–20 academic year, while the main location in St. Charles remained open. The approximately 1,100 students enrolled in undergraduate programs at the Belleville campus were permitted to transfer to Lindenwood University in St. Charles and the institution vowed to honor all athletic scholarships for transferring students, even if they no longer participated in sports after relocating. Following the cessation of undergraduate programs, only evening classes continued at Belleville.

The university had, as of 2021, spent $42,000,000 on the campus, according to Patty Gregory, the mayor.

== Campus ==
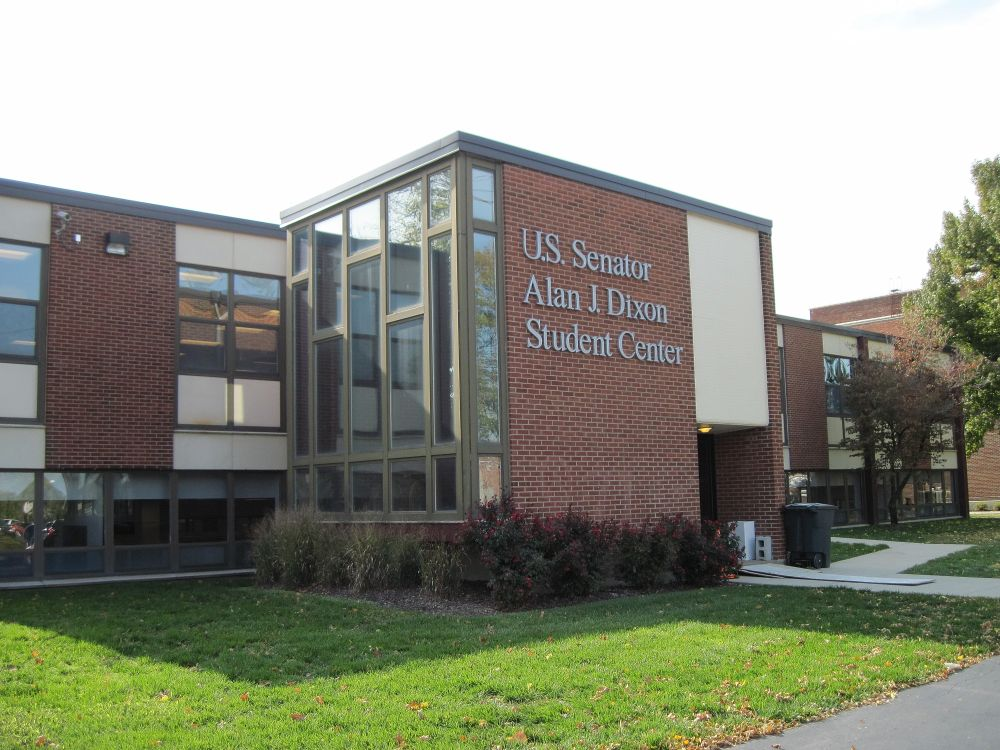
The Senator Alan J. Dixon Student Center

The 35-acre (14.16 ha) campus is located on West Main Street in Belleville, Illinois, about 16 miles (26 km) east of St. Louis, Missouri. Lindenwood University acquired the campus that was previously home to Belleville West High School. The Administration Building is located at the center of the Lindenwood Belleville campus. The building also houses many of the academic spaces and facilities and Matt's Cafe.

Lindenwood–Belleville also includes a 900-seat auditorium for performance art and guest speaking engagements, built in 1925 by noted architect William B. Ittner. In 2009, the university began construction of the Alice E. Ackermann Welcome Center, which added 3,000 square feet (280 m^{2}) adjacent to the current auditorium. Other additions to the campus included the Communications Center, Alan J. Dixon Student Center, William L. Enyart Veterans Success Center, Badgley Tennis Complex, and Fred J. Hern Residence Hall.

The campus also includes a number of recreational and intercollegiate athletic facilities. The Lynx Arena is the home to the basketball and volleyball programs while also housing a recreational gym and fitness center on the lower level. Other current sports facilities include tennis courts, a soccer field, and a football stadium.

In 2014, Lindenwood Belleville opened a satellite campus of its own in nearby Collinsville, Ill. which offered a variety of accelerated program options.

=== Housing ===
In February 2012, Lindenwood Belleville announced that it purchased the EconoLodge motel, formerly known as the Hyatt Lodge motel, at 2120 W. Main Street for use as student dormitories, named the Lynx Lodge. The addition of the Lynx Lodge property increased the residential student capacity to about 500 for the 2012–13 academic year. Lindenwood Belleville continued to purchase private residential homes surrounding the campus to increase on-campus living capacity, totaling 35 homes as of 2017.

Lindenwood Belleville opened its first of two traditional residence halls in early 2014. The first residence hall is a 25,000-square-foot building that housed 180 female students. The residence hall was built at a cost of $4 million. A second residence hall, the Fred J. Kern Residence Hall, completed in 2014, is a three-story building that housed 200 male students. With the completion of the second residence hall, Lindenwood Belleville had the capacity to house approximately 1,000 students on campus.

Lindenwood Belleville offered a variety of housing options, from traditional residence halls to apartments and residential houses. The Fred J. Kern Men's Residence Hall opened in 2014, and the Lady Lynx Lodge opened in 2013. Apartments and residential houses were available to upper classmen. The rooms are furnished and have Internet access.

The campus offered three dining options: Matt's Café, located in Old Main Hall; the Dixon Center Dining Hall; and Grab-and-Go, located in the U.S. Senator Alan J. Dixon Student Center. All offered a variety of options with flexible hours.

== Academics ==
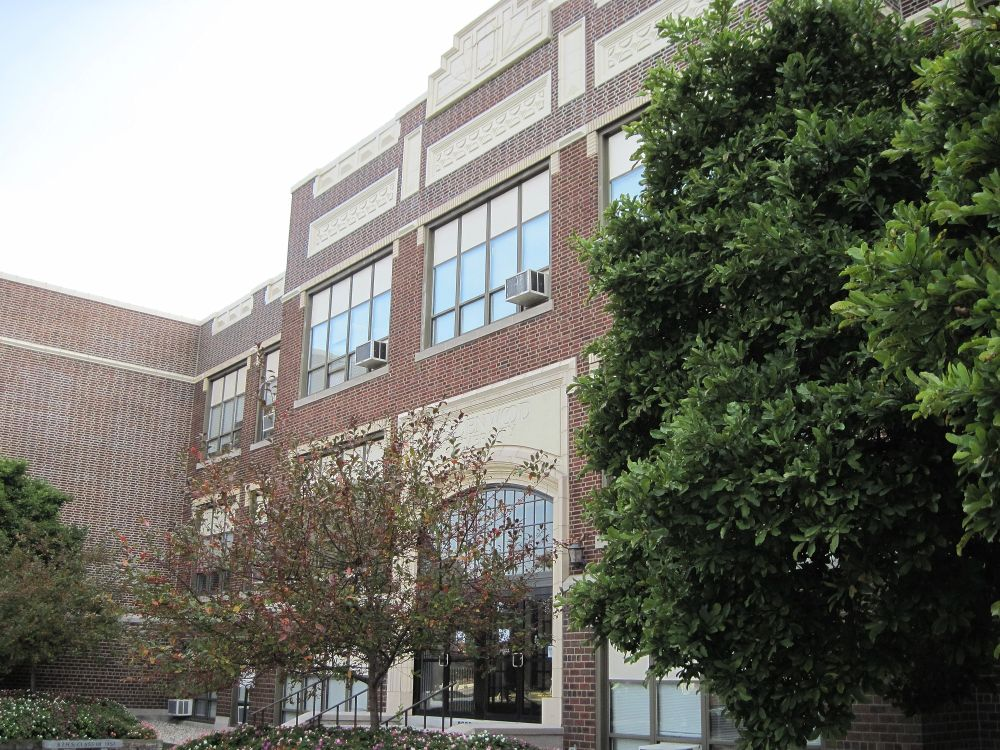
Administration Building

Lindenwood Belleville had full accreditation from the Higher Learning Commission (HLC) of the North Central Association of Colleges and Schools. Lindenwood Belleville was also fully accredited by the Illinois Board of Higher Education and Lindenwood's Plaster School of Business and Entrepreneurship was fully accredited by the Accreditation Council for Business Schools and Programs (ACBSP).

== Athletics ==
Lindenwood Belleville Lynx logo

The athletic teams of the Belleville campus were called the Lynx. The campus was a member of the National Association of Intercollegiate Athletics (NAIA); primarily competing as a member of the American Midwest Conference (AMC) from 2014–15 to 2019–20 (when the school closed).

During the 2014–15 season, Lindenwood–Belleville added men's and women's ice hockey as well as men's and women's swimming and diving. The AMC is a non-football conference, so the Lindenwood–Belleville football program played in the Mid-States Football Association beginning in 2015.

=== Athletics history ===
When the campus closure was announced, student-athletes comprised nearly 80 percent of the student body at Lindenwood–Belleville. Since beginning the Lindenwood–Belleville athletic program, the university has steadily increased the number of sports offered, with more to be added in the future. The university began competition as a member of United States Collegiate Athletic Association (USCAA) beginning in the 2009–10 school year. Lindenwood–Belleville was accepted into the NAIA as a full member effective August 1, 2012 and competed as an independent within the NAIA in the Association of Independent Institutions (AII) as well as the USCAA.

The university announced the additions of nine new sports for the 2011–12 academic year, including baseball, softball, table tennis, men's and women's lacrosse, men's and women's bowling, wrestling, and women's field hockey.

Lindenwood–Belleville joined the American Midwest Conference (AMC) starting in the 2014–15 academic year and the Mid-States Football Association for the 2015 season. Lindenwood–Belleville also added men's and women's ice hockey as well as men's and women's swimming and diving.

The university continued to expand athletics, with the announcement of men's and women's rugby and women's field hockey programs.

As part of the university's announcement of the cessation of traditional undergraduate programs, 2019–20 was the final season for all but two intercollegiate athletics programs—swimming and diving and the men's ice hockey teams were disbanded after the 2018–19 season.

=== Teams ===
In the 2017–18 school year, the university fielded 33 varsity teams for men and women. Teams competed in the American Midwest Conference (AMC), Mid-South Conference, Mid-States Football Association, and American Collegiate Hockey Association.

Men's sports included: baseball, basketball, competitive cheer, cross country, football, golf, ice hockey, lacrosse, rugby, soccer, swimming and diving, tennis, track and field, volleyball, and wrestling.

Women's sports included: basketball, competitive cheer, competitive dance, cross country, golf, ice hockey, lacrosse, soccer, softball, swimming and diving, tennis, track and field, volleyball, and wrestling.

For details pertaining to Lindenwood University-Belleville athletics, visit here.

=== Football ===
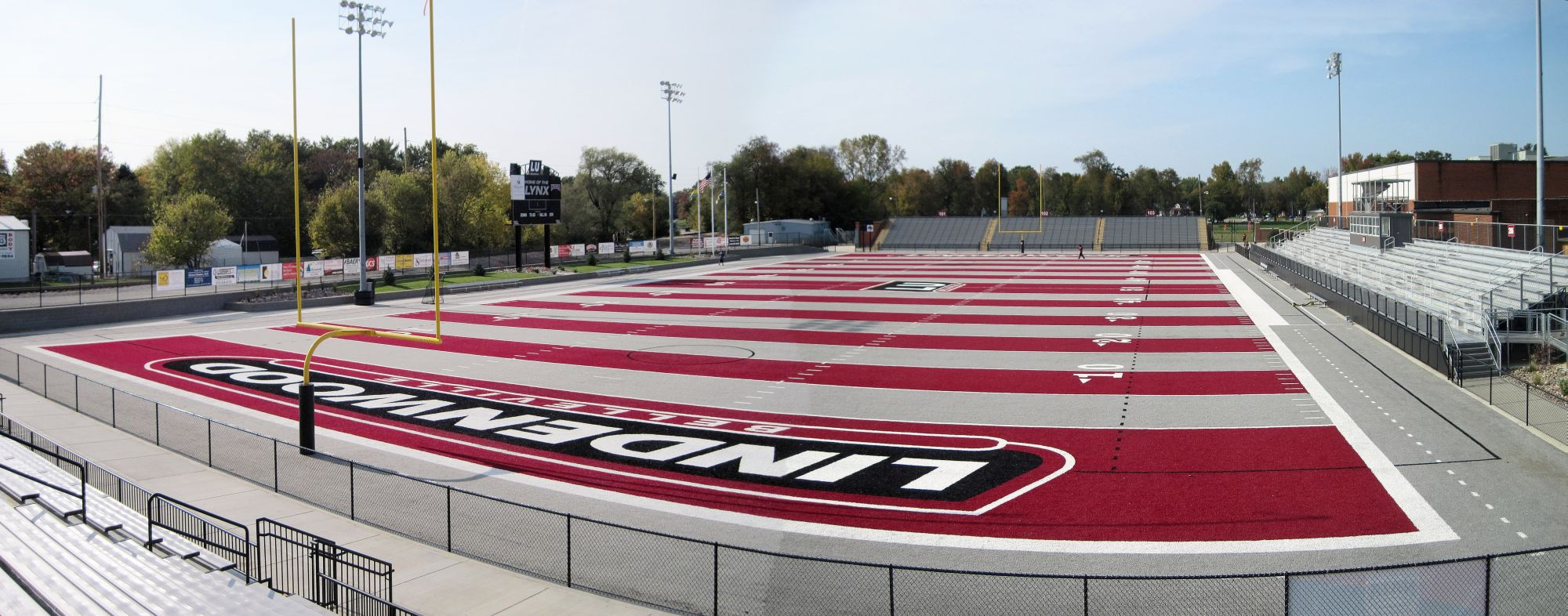
Lindenwood University-Belleville Stadium

In December 2011, Jeff Fisher (not to be confused with the former Tennessee Titans and Los Angeles Rams head coach of the same name.) was announced as the first head football coach of the Lindenwood–Belleville football team, which began play in fall 2012. Fisher came to Lindenwood–Belleville after serving as an assistant coach and the offensive coordinator for McKendree University for 15 years.

In March 2012, Lindenwood–Belleville broke ground on a $2.3 million renovation to the former Township Stadium. The upgraded stadium, named Lindenwood Stadium, has a seating capacity of 4,129. The Lindenwood–Belleville football program opened its first NAIA season on September 1, 2012, with a 43-37 win over Avila University.

Dale Carlson was hired as head football coach for the 2015 season.
