= Justin Berna =

American football player and coach

Current position
- Title: Head coach
- Team: Coalinga
- Conference: CVC
- Record: 34-46

Playing career
- 2002–2003: West Hills Coalinga
- 2004–2005: Lindenwood

Coaching career (HC unless noted)
- 2006–2008: Lindenwood (WR/RB)
- 2009–2010: MacMurray (AHC/OC)
- 2011–2016: Avila
- 2017–present: West Hills Coalinga / Coalinga

Head coaching record
- Overall: 16–49 (college); 34–46 (junior college)
- Bowls: 0–3 (junior college)

Accomplishments and honors

Championships
- 1 AGCL (2022)

Justin Berna is an American college football coach. He is the head football coach at Coalinga College, a position he has held since 2017. Berna served as the head football coach at Avila University in Kansas City, Missouri from 2011 to 2016.

== Head coaching record ==
=== College ===
Year	Team	Overall	Conference	Standing	Bowl/playoffs
Avila Eagles (Heart of America Athletic Conference) (2011–2016)
2011	Avila	4–6	4–5	6th	
2012	Avila	1–10	1–8	9th	
2013	Avila	4–7	2–7	T–8th	
2014	Avila	4–7	2–7	T–8th	
2015	Avila	3–8	2–3	4th (South)	
2016	Avila	0–11	0–5	6th (South)	
Avila:		16–49	11–35		
Total:		16–49			

=== Junior college ===
Year	Team	Overall	Conference	Standing	Bowl/playoffs
West Hills Coalinga Falcons (American Golden Coast League) (2017)
2017	West Hills Coalinga	6–3	4–2	T–3rd	
West Hills Coalinga Falcons (National Valley League) (2018–2021)
2018	West Hills Coalinga	4–6	2–3	4th	
2019	West Hills Coalinga	0–10	0–5	6th	
2020–21	No team—COVID-19				
2021	West Hills Coalinga	0–8	0–5	6th	
West Hills Coalinga / Coalinga Falcons (American Golden Coast League) (2022–present)
2022	West Hills Coalinga	6–5	5–1	T–1st	L Silicon Valley
2023	West Hills Coalinga	5–5	2–4	T–5th	
2024	Coalinga	6–5	4–2	3rd	L Grizzly Bowl
2025	Coalinga	7–4	4–1	2nd	L Golden State Bowl
West Hills Coalinga / Coalinga:		34–46	21–23		
Total:		34–46			
National championship Conference title Conference division title or championship game berth
