= Dillon Baxter =

American football player (born 1991)

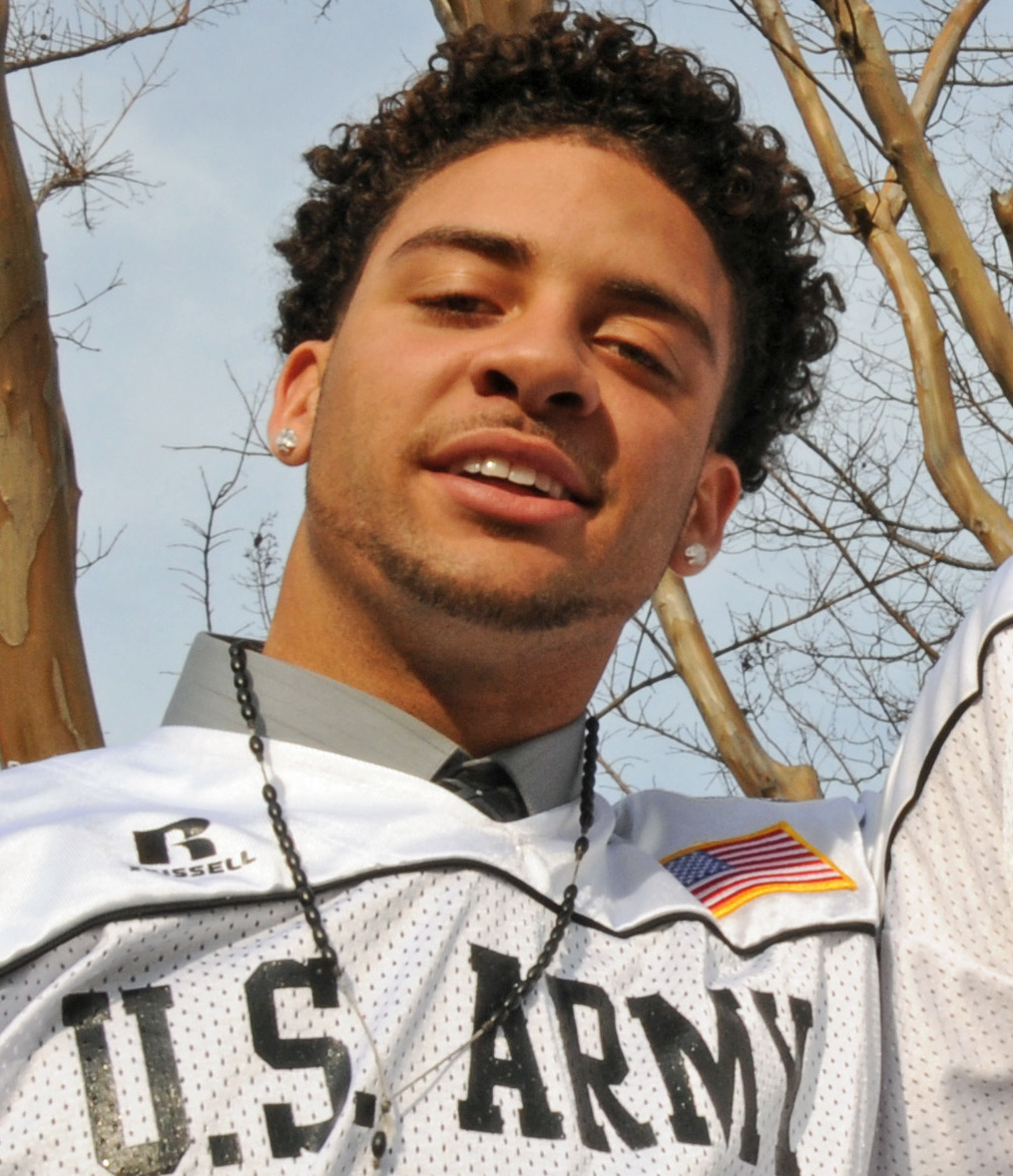
- Baxter in 2009

Profile
- Position: Running back / Wide receiver

Personal information
- Born: October 23, 1991 (age 35); San Diego, California, U.S.
- Listed height: 5 ft 11 in (1.80 m)
- Listed weight: 214 lb (97 kg)

Career information
- High school: San Diego (CA) Mission Bay
- College: Baker
- NFL draft: 2014: undrafted

Career history
- Seattle Seahawks (2014)*; Arizona Rattlers (2017)*
- * Offseason or practice squad member only

Dillon Baxter (born October 23, 1991) is an American former college football running back and wide receiver.

== Early life ==
Baxter prepped at Mission Bay Senior High School in San Diego, California, where he played quarterback, running back, and wide receiver as a senior. Mission Bay went 13–0 and won the CIF San Diego Division IV title in 2009. Baxter won the prestigious Silver Pigskin Trophy, awarded annually to San Diego County's most outstanding football player, chosen by KUSI television's Prep Pigskin Report. In addition, Baxter was a consensus High School All-American and also won the Hall Trophy. He chose to attend USC on an athletic scholarship.

== College career ==
Baxter joined the University of Southern California in 2010. In November, he was ruled temporarily ineligible for accepting benefits from an NFLPA-certified agent, but was later reinstated.

On October 25, 2011, ESPN reported that Baxter had been taken off the USC football team, but was still enrolled at the university. Baxter then transferred to San Diego State University and was scheduled to miss the 2012 season due to NCAA transfer restrictions. On February 29, 2012, however, he has been dismissed from the SDSU football program for "various reasons".

See 2012 Heart of America Athletic Conference football season

In May 2012, Baxter enrolled at Baker University, a small NAIA school in Baldwin City, Kansas.

In 2013, he rushed for 1,025 yards on 205 carries.

A March 10, 2014 article in The San Diego Union-Tribune indicated that Baxter had matured and was preparing for the NFL.

== Professional career ==
In 2014, Baxter was signed to the Seattle Seahawks' practice squad by Pete Carroll, the coach who formerly recruited him at USC, but he did not make the cut. Baxter also tried out for the Los Angeles Chargers.

On January 24, 2017, Baxter was released by the Arizona Rattlers of the Indoor Football League (IFL). He was re-signed just two days later. Baxter was released again on February 9.
