= Mission Bay High School =

Public high school in San Diego, California, United States

Mission Bay High School (MBHS)
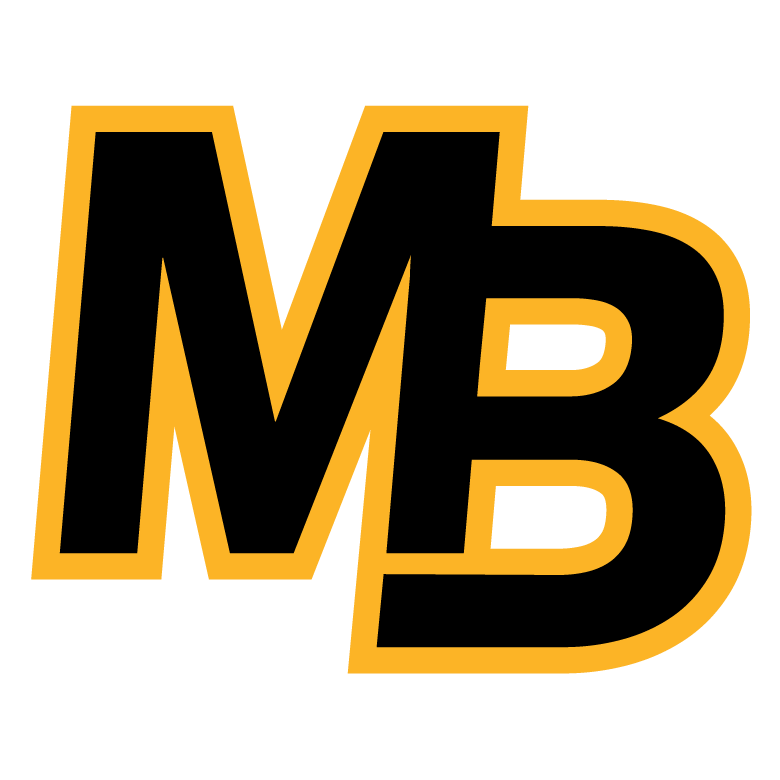

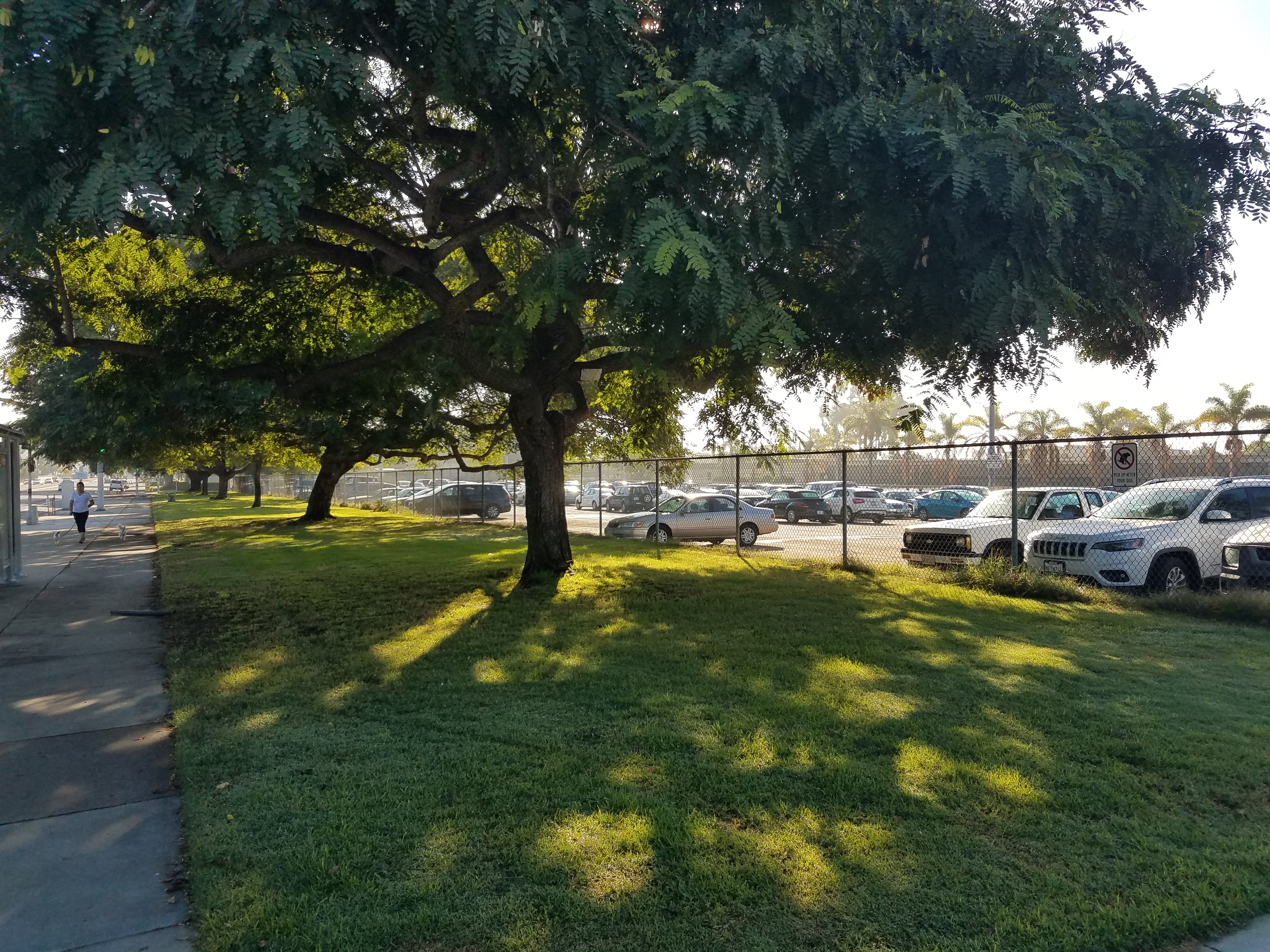
- NW Mission Bay Senior High School

Location
- 2475 Grand Av; San Diego, California 92109; United States; 32°48′02″N 117°13′24″W

Information
- Type: Public, Magnet
- Motto: Pride, dignity and excellence, in everything we do.
- Established: 1953
- Principal: Eric Brown
- Teaching staff: 60.93 (FTE)
- Enrollment: 1,240 (2024–2025)
- Student to teacher ratio: 20.35
- Colors: Black and gold
- Mascot: Buccaneer
- Newspaper: The Beachcomber
- District: San Diego Unified School District
- Website: missionbay.sandiegounified.org

Mission Bay High School (MBHS) is a public secondary school in San Diego, California, adjacent to Mission Bay in the community of Pacific Beach. It is a magnet school with emphasis on academic studies.

== Academics ==
The school's jazz program is home to the Award-winning and touring Mission Bay Preservationists, as well as the Mission Bay Mambo Orchestra, the only youth-Latin big band in California. The music program also includes a concert band, string orchestra, full-size symphonic orchestra, swing and concert choirs, and the aforementioned 2 jazz-bands. It has been taught by Jean-Paul Balmat since 2006, who became Mission Bay High's music educator after a two-year hiatus from 2004 to 2006.

In 2006, Mission Bay introduced International Baccalaureate courses that students could take to help them achieve their I.B. diploma.

== Demographics ==
For the 2024–25 school year, Mission Bay High School had a total enrollment of 1,240 students. The racial and ethnic makeup of the student body was: American Indian/Alaska Native – 1 (0.1%), Asian – 58 (4.7%), Black – 35 (2.8%), Hispanic – 456 (36.8%), White – 545 (44.0%), Native Hawaiian/Pacific Islander – 4 (0.3%), and Two or More Races – 140 (11.3%).

== Notable alumni ==
Name	Grad Class	Category	Best Known For
Adia Barnes		Sports	Basketball player and coach, national high school record-holder for blocks, all-time scoring and rebounding record-holder for the University of Arizona, now head coach of the Arizona Wildcats
Jean Marc Barr		Entertainment	French-American actor
Dillon Baxter		Sports	USC football player
Christina Burkenroad		Sports	Professional soccer player for Rayadas
Matt Bush		Sports	Baseball player, pitcher for the Texas Rangers, No. 1 overall pick of the 2004 Major League Baseball draft
Ron Bushy		Music	Drummer for the band Iron Butterfly
Amir Derakh		Music	Guitarist with bands Rough Cutt, Orgy, Dead by Sunrise, and Julien-K
Boogie Ellis		Sports	Basketball player with the Sacramento Kings
Arian Foster		Sports	Collegiate football star for the Tennessee Volunteers, NFL running back for the Houston Texans and Miami Dolphins
Skip Frye		Sports	Surfer
Mike Fuentes		Music	Drummer of Pierce the Veil
Vic Fuentes		Music	Singer and guitarist of Pierce the Veil
Rosie Hamlin		Music	Singer, Rosie and the Originals
Mike Houghton		Sports	Selected in the 2002 NFL draft by the Green Bay Packers, attended San Diego State University
Charles Jock		Sports	Track and Field Olympian, 2012 NCAA D1 Champion (800m)
Tawny Kitaen		Entertainment	Actress (attended, but did not graduate)
Shawn Kerri		Arts	Artist
Jeanne Lenhart		Sports	Senior Olympian, amateur volleyball player, senior pageant winner
Matt Maslowski		Sports	Former NFL player with the Los Angeles Rams and Chicago Bears
Casey Nicholaw		Entertainment	Broadway director, choreographer, and actor
Jason Parker		Sports	UFL player for the California Redwoods
Kevin Reese		Sports	Major League Baseball player for the New York Yankees
Betsy Russell		Entertainment	Film and television actress
Mike Schaefer		Politics	Political activist, San Diego City Councilman (1965–71), State Board of Equalization member (2018–2026), oldest constitutional officer in California history
Richard R. Schrock		Science	Chemist and Nobel laureate
Pat Shea		Sports	Former AFL player
Joel Skinner		Sports	Major League Baseball player and coach of the Cleveland Indians
Marcus Smith		Sports	Former NFL player
Karen Hantze Susman		Sports	Wimbledon champion
Brock Ungricht		Sports	College baseball coach
Tom Warren		Sports	1979 Ironman champion, businessman
Frank Zappa		Music	Musician (attended, but did not graduate. Graduated from Antelope Valley High School )

== Notable faculty ==
- Tony Corbin, former professional football player.

== See also ==
- Primary and secondary schools in San Diego, California
