= Heart of America Athletic Conference =

College athletic conference

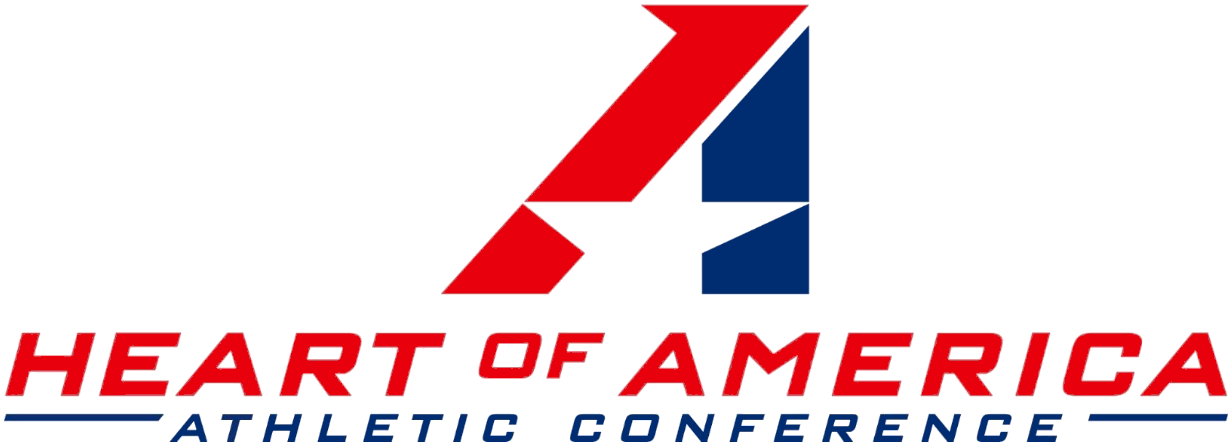
- Association: NAIA
- Founded: 1971
- Commissioner: Nik Rule (since 2024)
- Sports fielded: 23; men's: 12; women's: 11
- No. of teams: 16
- Headquarters: Overland Park, Kansas
- Region: West North Central
- Website: heartofamericaconference.com

Locations
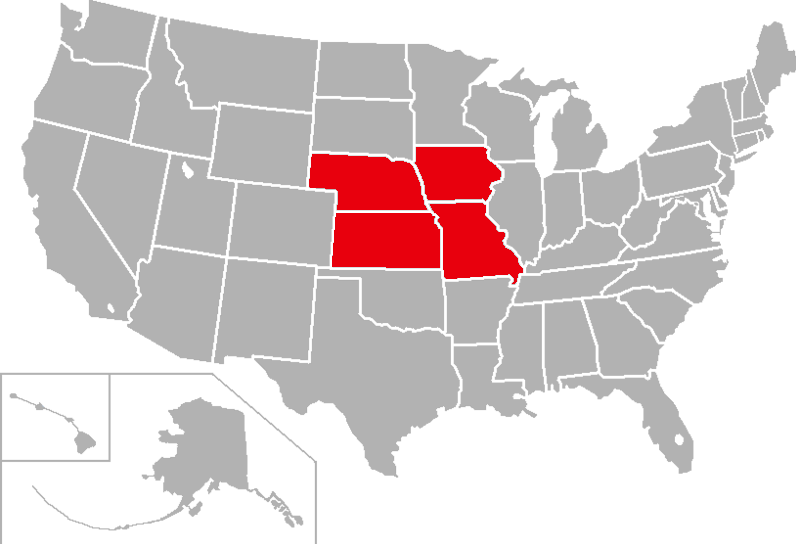

The Heart of America Athletic Conference (HAAC or The Heart) is a college athletic conference affiliated with the National Association of Intercollegiate Athletics (NAIA). Member institutions are located in Iowa, Kansas, Missouri, and Nebraska in the United States.

== History ==
Heart of America Athletic Conference
Location of HAAC members: current

The HAAC's earliest ancestor was the Missouri College Athletic Union (MCAU), which was formed in 1924 when the Missouri Intercollegiate Athletic Association (now the Mid-America Intercollegiate Athletics Association or MIAA) split in two. The old MIAA's private schools formed the Athletic Union, while the state teachers' colleges stayed in the MIAA. It was reorganized as the HAAC in 1971 when it began admitting schools outside Missouri. However, the HAAC does not presently claim the Athletic Union's history as its own.

In early 2014, Grand View University and William Penn University were announced as members for the 2015–16 school year. In April 2015, Clarke University and Mount Mercy University were also announced as members for the 2016–17 school year. In October 2019, Park University was approved for HAAC membership and joined in the 2020–21 school year. On February 10, 2022, long-serving Evangel University accepted its invitation to join the Kansas Collegiate Athletic Conference, also Kansas-based, in 2023.

On July 24, 2023, William Woods University (alongside St. Ambrose) announced they would join the conference as associate members in football beginning in the 2024 fall season (2024–25 school year). The expansion made it NAIA's largest football conference with 14 teams playing in two divisions.

The current commissioner of the conference is Lori Thomas. Thomas, the first female commissioner in NAIA history, began her term in 2014, succeeding Larry Lady who retired after 22 years as commissioner.

=== Chronological timeline ===
- 1971 – The Heart of America Athletic Conference (HAAC) was founded. Charter members included Baker University, Central Methodist College (now Central Methodist University), the College of Emporia, Graceland College (now Graceland University), Missouri Valley College (now Missouri Valley University), Ottawa University, Tarkio College and William Jewell College, beginning the 1971–72 academic year.
- 1974 – The College of Emporia left the HAAC as the school announced that it would close after the 1973–74 academic year.
- 1980 – Culver–Stockton College and Mid-America Nazarene College (now MidAmerica Nazarene University) joined the HAAC in the 1980–81 academic year.
- 1982 – Ottawa left the HAAC to rejoin the Kansas Collegiate Athletic Conference (KCAC) after the 1981–82 academic year.
- 1986 – Central Methodist left the HAAC to become an NAIA Independent after the 1985–86 academic year.
- 1987 – Evangel College (now Evangel University) joined the HAAC in the 1987–88 academic year.
- 1991 – Benedictine College joined the HAAC (with Central Methodist rejoining), both effective in the 1991–92 academic year.
- 1996 – Lindenwood College (now Lindenwood University) joined the HAAC in the 1996–97 academic year.
- 2000 – Avila College (now Avila University) joined the HAAC in the 2000–01 academic year.
- 2011 – Two institutions left the HAAC and the NAIA to join the Division II ranks of the National Collegiate Athletic Association (NCAA), both effective after the 2010–11 academic year:
  - Lindenwood as an NCAA D-II Independent (which would later join the Mid-America Intercollegiate Athletics Association (MIAA), beginning the 2012–13 school year)
  - William Jewell to the Great Lakes Valley Conference (GLVC)
- 2011 – Peru State College joined the HAAC in the 2011–12 academic year.
- 2015 – Grand View University and William Penn University (both coming from the defunct Midwest Collegiate Conference (MCC)) joined the HAAC in the 2015–16 academic year.
- 2016 – Clarke University and Mount Mercy University (also both coming from the defunct Midwest Collegiate (MCC) after spending a season as NAIA Independents) joined the HAAC in the 2016–17 academic year.
- 2017 – Dickinson State University joined the HAAC as an affiliate member for men's wrestling in the 2017–18 academic year.
- 2018 – Avila left the HAAC to join the KCAC after the 2017–18 academic year.
- 2020 – Park University joined the HAAC in the 2020–21 academic year.
- 2020 – Three institutions joined the HAAC as affiliate members, all effective in the 2020–21 academic year:
  - Missouri Baptist University and the University of Health Sciences and Pharmacy in St. Louis (UHSP) for men's volleyball
  - Waldorf University for men's & women's wrestling
- 2021 – Two institutions joined the HAAC as affiliate members, both effective in the 2021–22 academic year:
  - St. Ambrose University for only men's wrestling
  - Iowa Wesleyan University for men's & women's wrestling
- 2022 – Two institutions joined the HAAC as affiliate members (and/or added other single sports into their affiliate memberships), both effective in the 2023 spring season (2022–23 academic year):
  - Mount Vernon Nazarene University for men's lacrosse
  - St. Ambrose for men's and women's lacrosse
- 2023 – Evangel left the HAAC to join the KCAC after the 2022–23 academic year.
- 2023 – Iowa Wesleyan left the HAAC as an affiliate member for men's and women's wrestling after the 2023–24 academic year; as the school announced that it ceased operations.
- 2023 – Two institutions added other single sports into their HAAC affiliate memberships, both effective in the 2023–24 academic year:
  - Dickinson State for women's wrestling
  - Missouri Baptist for football
- 2024 – Two institutions left the HAAC as affiliate members, both effective after the 2023–24 academic year:
  - Mount Vernon Nazarene for men's lacrosse
  - Waldorf for men's and women's wrestling
- 2024 – Thirteen institutions joined the HAAC as affiliate members (and/or added other single sports into their affiliate memberships), all effective in the 2024–25 academic year:
  - Central Christian College of Kansas, Dordt University, Kansas Wesleyan University and Morningside University for men's volleyball
  - Columbia College for men's lacrosse
  - John Brown University and Texas Wesleyan University for men's and women's tennis
  - Midland University for men's and women's lacrosse
  - Ottawa University for men's and women's lacrosse and men's volleyball
  - Missouri Baptist for men's and women's lacrosse and men's and women's tennis
  - St. Ambrose for football
  - USHP for women's lacrosse
  - William Woods University for football, men's lacrosse, and men's and women's tennis
- 2025:
  - Missouri Baptist and William Woods joined the HAAC as full members for all sports in the 2025–26 academic year.
  - Three institutions joined the HAAC as affiliate members (and/or added other single sports into their affiliate memberships), all effective in the 2025–26 academic year:
    - Bismarck State College for men's and women's wrestling
    - Hastings College and McPherson College for shotgun sports
- 2026:
  - St. Ambrose joined the HAAC as a full member for all sports in the 2026–27 academic year.
  - Bellevue University joined the HAAC as an affiliate member for women's wrestling, beginning the 2026–27 academic year.

== Member schools ==
=== Current members ===
The HAAC currently has 16 full members, all but one are private schools. All but one of the private schools are religiously affiliated:

Institution	Location	Founded	Affiliation	Enrollment	Nickname	Joined (Note: Represents the calendar year when fall sports competition begins.)
Baker University	Baldwin City, Kansas	1858	United Methodist	1,945	Wildcats	1971
Benedictine College	Atchison, Kansas	1858	Catholic (Benedictines)	2,465	Ravens	1991
Central Methodist University	Fayette, Missouri	1854	United Methodist	1,017	Eagles	1971; 1991 (Note: Central Methodist left the HAAC after the 1985–86 school year; before rejoining in the 1991–92 school year.)
Clarke University	Dubuque, Iowa	1843	Catholic (B.V.M.)	1,025	Pride	2016
Culver–Stockton College	Canton, Missouri	1853	Disciples of Christ	1,069	Wildcats	1980
Graceland University	Lamoni, Iowa	1895	Community of Christ	1,195	Yellowjackets	1971
Grand View University	Des Moines, Iowa	1896	Lutheran ELCA	1,796	Vikings	2015
MidAmerica Nazarene University	Olathe, Kansas	1966	Nazarene	1,539	Pioneers	1980
Missouri Baptist University	Creve Coeur, Missouri	1957	Baptist	5,641	Spartans	2025 (Note: Prior to becoming a full member, Missouri Baptist competed as an affiliate member of the HAAC for men's volleyball from 2020–21 to 2024–25; football from 2023–24 to 2024–25; and men's & women's lacrosse and men's & women's tennis during the 2024–25 school year.)
Missouri Valley University	Marshall, Missouri	1889	Presbyterian (PCUSA)	1,619	Vikings	1971
Mount Mercy University	Cedar Rapids, Iowa	1928	Catholic (R.S.M.)	1,451	Mustangs	2016
Park University	Parkville, Missouri	1875	Nonsectarian	6,634	Pirates	2020
Peru State College	Peru, Nebraska	1865	Public	1,638	Bobcats	2011
St. Ambrose University	Davenport, Iowa	1882	Catholic (Diocese of Davenport)	2,703	Fighting Bees	2026 (Note: Prior to becoming a full member, St. Ambrose competed as an affiliate member of the HAAC for men's wrestling since 2021–22; men's & women's lacrosse since 2022–23; and football since the 2024–25 school year.)
William Penn University	Oskaloosa, Iowa	1873	Quakers	1,536	Statesmen	2015
William Woods University	Fulton, Missouri	1870	Disciples of Christ	1,729	Owls	2025 (Note: Prior to becoming a full member, William Woods competed as an affiliate member of the HAAC for football, men's lacrosse and men's & women's tennis during the 2024–25 school year.)

=== Affiliate members ===
The HAAC currently has fourteen affiliate members, all but two are private schools:

Institution	Location	Founded	Affiliation	Enrollment	Nickname	Joined (Note: Represents the calendar year when fall sports competition begins.)	HAAC sport(s)	Primary conference
Bellevue University	Bellevue, Nebraska	1966	Nonsectarian	14,476	Bruins	2026	Women's wrestling	Frontier
Bismarck State College	Bismarck, North Dakota	1939	Public	4,065	Mystics	2025	Men's wrestling	Frontier
Bismarck State College	Bismarck, North Dakota	1939	Public	4,065	Mystics	2025	Women's wrestling	Frontier
Columbia College	Columbia, Missouri	1851	Nonsectarian	6,046	Cougars	2024	Men's lacrosse	American Midwest
Dickinson State University	Dickinson, North Dakota	1918	Public	1,453	Blue Hawks	2017	Men's wrestling	Frontier
Dickinson State University	Dickinson, North Dakota	1918	Public	1,453	Blue Hawks	2023	Women's wrestling	Frontier
Dordt University	Sioux Center, Iowa	1955	Christian Reformed	1,929	Defenders	2024	Men's volleyball	Great Plains (GPAC)
Hastings College	Hastings, Nebraska	1882	Presbyterian (PCUSA)	1,011	Broncos	2025	Shotgun sports	Great Plains (GPAC)
John Brown University	Siloam Springs, Arkansas	1919	Interdenominational	2,341	Golden Eagles	2024	Men's tennis	Sooner (SAC)
John Brown University	Siloam Springs, Arkansas	1919	Interdenominational	2,341	Golden Eagles	2024	Women's tennis	Sooner (SAC)
Kansas Wesleyan University	Salina, Kansas	1886	United Methodist	951	Coyotes	2024	Men's volleyball	Kansas (KCAC)
McPherson College	McPherson, Kansas	1887	Brethren	788	Bulldogs	2025	Shotgun sports	Kansas (KCAC)
Midland University	Fremont, Nebraska	1883	Lutheran ELCA	1,557	Warriors	2024	Men's lacrosse	Great Plains (GPAC)
Midland University	Fremont, Nebraska	1883	Lutheran ELCA	1,557	Warriors	2024	Women's lacrosse	Great Plains (GPAC)
Midland University	Fremont, Nebraska	1883	Lutheran ELCA	1,557	Warriors	2025	Shotgun sports	Great Plains (GPAC)
Morningside University	Sioux City, Iowa	1894	United Methodist	2,158	Mustangs	2024	Men's volleyball	Great Plains (GPAC)
Ottawa University	Ottawa, Kansas	1865	Baptist	1,055	Braves	2024	Men's lacrosse	Kansas (KCAC)
Ottawa University	Ottawa, Kansas	1865	Baptist	1,055	Braves	2024	Women's lacrosse	Kansas (KCAC)
Ottawa University	Ottawa, Kansas	1865	Baptist	1,055	Braves	2024	Men's volleyball	Kansas (KCAC)
Texas Wesleyan University	Fort Worth, Texas	1890	United Methodist	2,595	Rams	2024	Men's tennis	Sooner (SAC)
Texas Wesleyan University	Fort Worth, Texas	1890	United Methodist	2,595	Rams	2024	Women's tennis	Sooner (SAC)
University of Health Sciences and Pharmacy in St. Louis (Note: UHSP will disband athletics in 2027.)	St. Louis, Missouri	1864	Nonsectarian	631	Eutectics	2020	Men's volleyball	American Midwest
University of Health Sciences and Pharmacy in St. Louis	St. Louis, Missouri	1864	Nonsectarian	631	Eutectics	2024	Women's lacrosse	American Midwest

=== Former members ===
The HAAC has seven former full members, all were private schools:

Institution	Location	Founded	Affiliation	Enrollment	Nickname	Joined (Note: Represents the calendar year when fall sports competition begins.)	Left (Note: Represents the calendar year when spring sports competition ends.)	Subsequent conference	Current conference
Avila University	Kansas City, Missouri	1916	Catholic (C.S.J.)	1,733	Eagles	2000	2018	Kansas (KCAC) (2018–present)	
College of Emporia	Emporia, Kansas	1882	Presbyterian	N/A	Fighting Presbies	1971	1974	Closed in 1974	
Evangel University	Springfield, Missouri	1955	Assemblies of God	2,157	Valor	1987	2023	Kansas (KCAC) (2023–present)	
Lindenwood University	St. Charles, Missouri	1827	Presbyterian (PCUSA)	7,288	Lions	1996	2011	various (Note: Lindenwood had joined the following subsequent conferences: as an NCAA D-II Independent during the 2011–12 school year; the Mid-America Intercollegiate Athletics Association (Note: Currently an NCAA Division II athletic conference.) (MIAA) from 2012–13 to 2018–19; and the Great Lakes Valley Conference (GLVC) from 2019–20 to 2021–22.)	Ohio Valley (OVC) (Note: Currently an NCAA Division I athletic conference.) (2022–present)
Ottawa University	Ottawa, Kansas	1865	American Baptist	1,055	Braves	1971	1982	Kansas (KCAC) (1982–present)	
Tarkio College	Tarkio, Missouri	1883	Presbyterian (UPCUSA)	N/A	Owls	1971	1992	Closed in 1992	
William Jewell College	Liberty, Missouri	1849	Nonsectarian	886	Cardinals	1971	2011	Great Lakes Valley (GLVC) (2011–present)	

=== Former affiliate members ===
The HAAC has four former affiliate members; which all were private schools:

Institution	Location	Founded	Affiliation	Enrollment	Nickname	Joined (Note: Represents the calendar year when fall sports competition begins.)	Left (Note: Represents the calendar year when spring sports competition ends.)	HAAC sport	Primary conference
Central Christian College of Kansas	McPherson, Kansas	1884	Free Methodist	455	Tigers	2024	2025	Men's volleyball	Sooner (SAC) (Note: After competing in the HAAC as an affiliate member, Central Christian (Ks.)'s men's volleyball team later competed as an affiliate member within the California Pacific Conference (CalPac).)
Iowa Wesleyan University	Mount Pleasant, Iowa	1842	United Methodist	N/A	Tigers	2021	2023	Men's wrestling	Closed in 2023
Iowa Wesleyan University	Mount Pleasant, Iowa	1842	United Methodist	N/A	Tigers	2021	2023	Women's wrestling	Closed in 2023
Mount Vernon Nazarene University	Mount Vernon, Ohio	1964	Nazarene	1,845	Cougars	2022	2024	Men's lacrosse	Crossroads (Note: After competing in the HAAC as an affiliate member, Mount Vernon Nazarene's men's lacrosse team later competed as an Independent.)
Waldorf University	Forest City, Iowa	1903	For-profit (Note: Formerly affiliated with the Evangelical Lutheran Church in America (ELCA) until 2010.)	2,657	Warriors	2020	2024	Men's wrestling	Great Plains (GPAC)
Waldorf University	Forest City, Iowa	1903	For-profit	2,657	Warriors	2020	2024	Women's wrestling	Great Plains (GPAC)

=== Membership timeline ===
Full member (all sports) Full member (non-football) Associate member (football) Associate member (sport)

== Sports ==
The conference also sponsors co-ed varsity sports of dance and cheer.

The following divisional format is used.
North
- Clarke
- Culver–Stockton
- Graceland
- Grand View
- Mount Mercy
- Peru State
- St. Ambrose (Note: Football only)
- William Penn
South
- Baker
- Benedictine
- Central Methodist
- MidAmerica Nazarene
- Missouri Baptist
- Missouri Valley
- Park (Note: Everything but football)
- William Woods
Notes

Conference sports
Sport	Men's	Women's
Baseball	✓	
Basketball	✓	✓
Bowling	✓	✓
Cross Country	✓	✓
Football	✓	
Golf	✓	✓
Lacrosse	✓	✓
Soccer	✓	✓
Softball		✓
Tennis	✓	✓
Track & Field Indoor	✓	✓
Track & Field Outdoor	✓	✓
Volleyball	✓	✓
Wrestling	✓	✓

== See also ==
- Heart of America (college rugby)
- Football seasons: 2011, 2012
