= Graceland Yellowjackets =

Athletic teams that represent Graceland University

- University: Graceland University
- Nickname: Yellowjackets
- Association: NAIA
- Conference: Heart of America
- Athletic director: Brady McKillip
- Location: Lamoni, Iowa
- Varsity teams: 22 (10 men’s, 9 women’s, 3 co-ed)
- Football stadium: Huntsman Field
- Basketball arena: Morden Center (formerly Closson Center)
- Baseball stadium: Chase Stadium
- Softball stadium: HMP Stadium
- Soccer stadium: John Rasmussen Soccer Complex
- Colors: Blue and black
- Mascot: Sting
- Fight song: Graceland Forever
- Website: gujackets.com
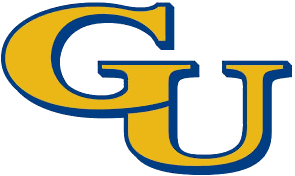

The Graceland Yellowjackets are the athletic teams that represent Graceland University, located in Lamoni, Iowa, in intercollegiate sports as a member of the National Association of Intercollegiate Athletics (NAIA), primarily competing in the Heart of America Athletic Conference (HAAC) since the 1971–72 academic year.

Over 50% of the students on Graceland's Lamoni campus are student athletes.

== Sports ==
Graceland competes in 22 intercollegiate varsity sports: Men's sports include baseball, basketball, cross country, football, golf, soccer, track & field (indoor and outdoor), volleyball and wrestling; while women's sports include basketball, cross country, flag football, golf, soccer, softball, track & field (indoor and outdoor) and volleyball; and co-ed sports include cheerleading, dance and rodeo.

Men's sports	Women's sports
Baseball	Basketball
Basketball	Cross country
Cross country	Flag football
Football	Golf
Golf	Soccer
Soccer	Softball
Track and field^{1}	Track and field^{1}
Volleyball	Volleyball
Wrestling	
Co-ed sports
Cheerleading
Dance
Rodeo
^{1} – includes both, indoor and outdoor

=== Football ===
In 2005, just four years after completing a season of 0–10, the Yellowjackets won their first HAAC championship title since 1975 and qualified for the NAIA national championships for the first time in the school's history. Herbert Goodman (1998–1999), and Jeff Criswell (1983–1986) went on to play in the NFL. Jerome Messam (2007–2009) as of 2018 plays in the CFL. The coach as of 2017 for the Yellowjackets was Marc Kolb.

=== Basketball ===
In 2018 the men's basketball team won the NAIA Division I National Championship. This was the Yellowjackets first appearance in the tournament.

== National championships ==
=== Team ===
Sport	Association	Division	Year	Opponent/Runner-up	Score
Men's soccer (1)	NAIA	Single	2006	Azusa Pacific	0−0, (7–6 pen.)

== School songs ==
The school's fight song, Graceland Forever, was written by Warren McElwain in 1925. The school's alma mater was written by Roy A. Cheville in 1926.

== Notable alumni ==
- Jeff Criswell – offensive lineman for Indianapolis Colts (1987), New York Jets (1988–1994) and Kansas City Chiefs (1995–1998)
- Herbert Goodman – running back rushing for over 2,000 yards; current professional mixed martial arts fighter
- Caitlyn Jenner – 1976 Olympic gold medalist, who was also selected by the Kansas City Kings in the 1977 NBA draft despite not having played ball for Graceland; Jenner remains the school's only draft pick by any major pro sports league
- Kevin Souter – Kansas City Wizards in Major League Soccer
- Jerome Messam – running back for the Calgary Stampeders of the Canadian Football League
