= Liston Stadium =

Sport stadium in Baldwin City, Kansas, United States

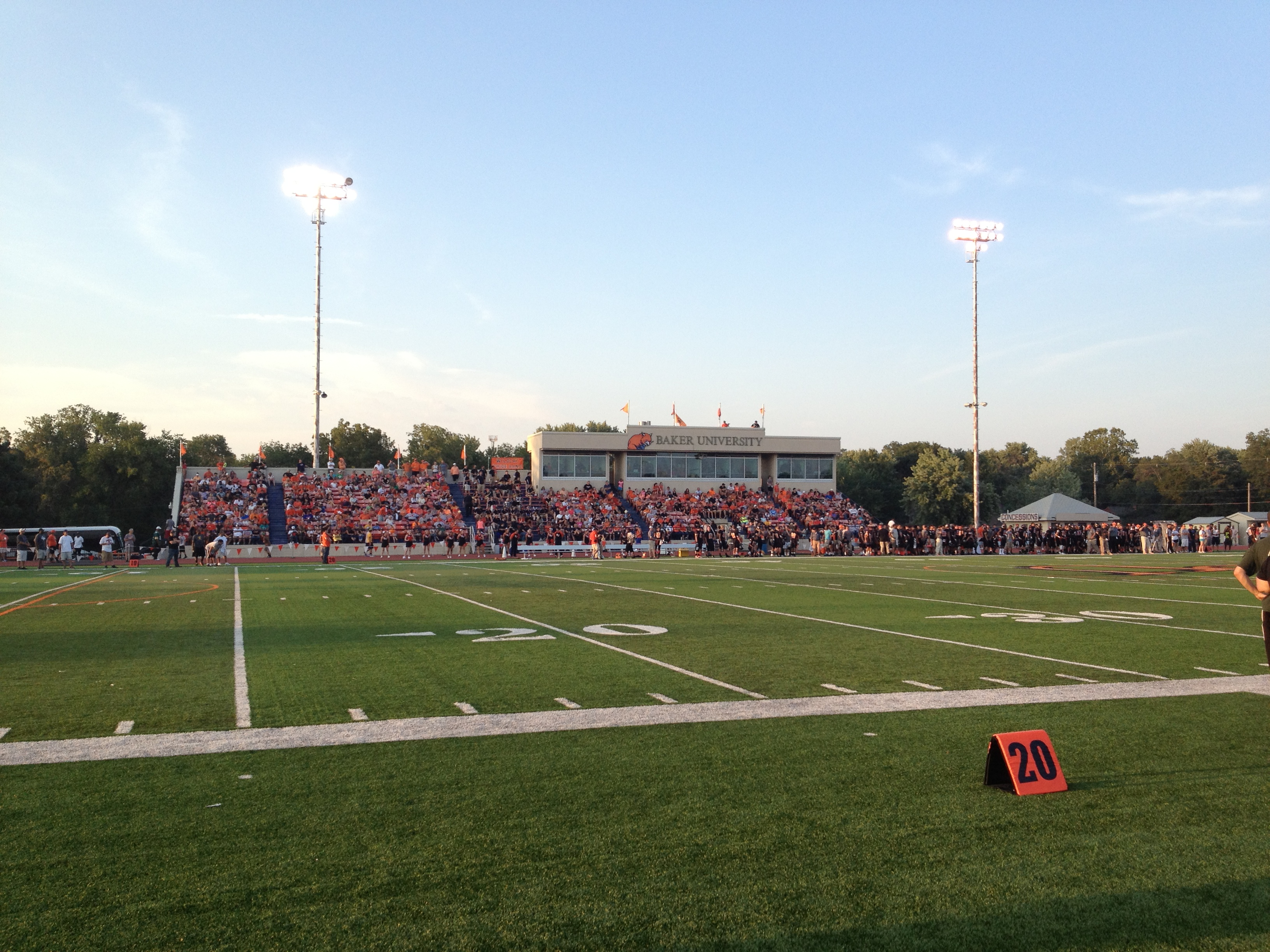
- Field level view
- Interactive map of Liston Stadium
- Location: Baldwin City, Kansas
- Coordinates: 38°46′35″N 95°10′42″W
- Owner: Baker University
- Operator: Baker University
- Capacity: 4,000
- Surface: FieldTurf

Construction
- Opened: 1930

Tenant
- Baker Wildcats football

Liston Stadium is a sport stadium in Baldwin City, Kansas, United States. The facility is primarily used by Baker University for college football, track and field, and soccer. It is also host to other university and city athletic and non-athletic events. The facility is also used for local high school football games.

The stadium was named for former Baker football coach and athletic director Emil Liston.
