= Avila University =

Catholic university in Kansas City, Missouri, US

- Former names: College of St. Teresa (1916–1961); Avila College (1961–2002)
- Motto: Deo adjuvante non timendum
- Motto in English: With the help of God there is nothing to fear.
- Type: Private university
- Established: 1916; 110 years ago
- Religious affiliation: Roman Catholic (Sisters of St. Joseph of Carondelet)
- President: Dr. Todd Pfannestiel
- Students: 3,383 (fall 2025)
- Undergraduates: 1,542 (fall 2025)
- Postgraduates: 1,841 (fall 2025)
- Location: Kansas City, Missouri, United States; 38.9126°N 94.5915°W
- Colors: Purple, gold and black
- Nickname: Eagles
- Sporting affiliations: NAIA – KCAC
- Mascot: Dominic the Eagle
- Website: avila.edu

Avila University /ˈævɪlə/ is a private Catholic university in Kansas City, Missouri, United States. It is sponsored by the Sisters of St. Joseph of Carondelet and offers bachelor's degrees and master's degrees. Its 13 buildings are situated on a campus of 50 acres (20.2 ha) in Kansas City. The university had a total enrollment of 2,768 students in fall 2024, including 1,331 undergraduate students and 1,437 graduate students.

== History ==
In 1916, on the same campus at 5600 Main Street as St. Teresa's Academy, the Sisters of St. Joseph of Carondelet founded the College of Saint Teresa. St. Teresa's College was founded as a two-year college for women only. The first graduates of St. Teresa's College received their degrees in 1918.

In 1939, Kansas City Bishop Edwin O'Hara announced that St. Teresa's junior college would be expanded to a full four-year college, and the college would be housed in its own building on the campus. In 1940, ground was broken for Donnelly Hall, and it opened for classes in 1941. The first four-year graduating class received their degrees in 1942. In 1948, the college established a department of nursing, offering both a three-year diploma and a four-year bachelor of nursing degree.

In May 1961, Sister Mary Daniel Tammany, president of the College of St. Teresa, announced the purchase of 49 acres of land for a new campus at 119th and Wornall Road in the Red Bridge neighborhood near the southern edge of Kansas City, Missouri. The high school, St. Teresa's Academy, is still operating on the original site. At the groundbreaking for the first building on the new campus, the announcement was made that the college would be renamed Avila College, still in honor of Saint Teresa of Avila. In 1969 Avila began admitting male students, and in 1978, the college began offering graduate programs in business, education, and psychology. Avila College became Avila University in July 2002.

== Student body ==
As of fall 2024, Avila University enrolled undergraduate and graduate students, female students outnumbered male students 62 percent to 38 percent. 57 percent of students were Caucasian, 20 percent were African-American, 10 percent international, and 8 percent Hispanic. Twenty percent were Catholic. The average ACT score of the incoming freshman class is 23. About 31% of students live on campus.

== Admissions ==
For the fall 2024 admissions cycle, Avila University reported an acceptance rate of 87.8 percent.

== Academics ==
Avila University is divided into three colleges. Each college has a collection of schools:

- College of Liberal Arts & Social Sciences
1. School of Humanities
2. School of Performing Arts
3. School of Psychology
4. School of Social Sciences
- College of Science & Health
1. School of Natural and Applied Sciences
2. School of Computer Sciences & Mathematics
3. School of Imaging Sciences
4. School of Nursing
- College of Professional Schools
1. School of Business
2. School of Education
3. School of Visual and Communication Arts
4. Avila Institute for Professional Studies

== Campus ==
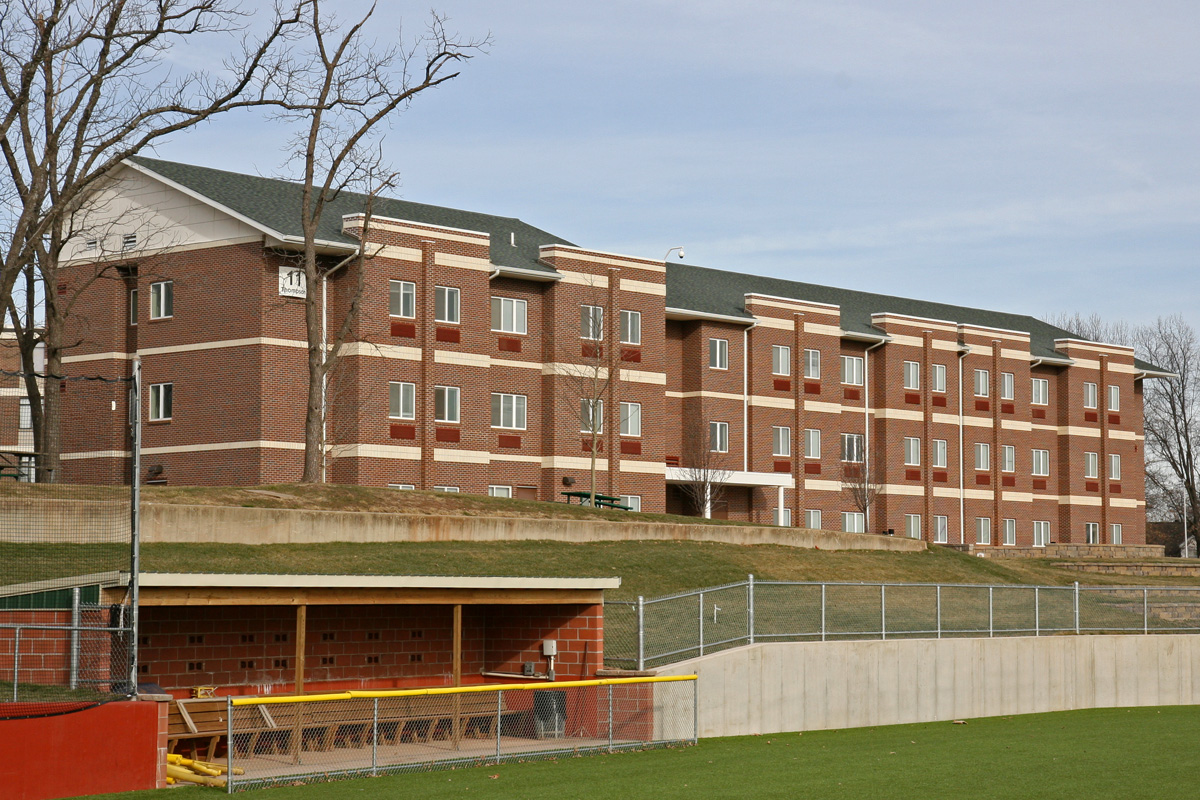
Opened in 2007, Thompson Hall is the second-newest residence hall on campus. The south side of the residence hall overlooks the athletics field.

Avila's campus sits on 50 acres (20.2 ha) in southern Kansas City, Missouri. There are 13 buildings that include four residence halls, a fieldhouse, theatre, student union, library, as well as academic buildings. The campus sits close to the Missouri-Kansas border.

=== Arizona location ===
In February 2025, Avila University announced an additional location, Avila University Arizona, in Goodyear, Arizona, part of the Phoenix metropolitan area. The Higher Learning Commission approved the additional location in February 2025, and it is also authorized by the Arizona State Board for Private Postsecondary Education. The Goodyear location offers graduate programs in business and technology management, with classes beginning in fall 2025.

=== Student life ===
Student life at Avila is quite active with more than 40 student organizations. There are no fraternities or sororities on campus.

=== Residential life ===
Carondelet Hall was the first residence hall built at the current Avila University location. Carondelet houses up to 122 students at its maximum capacity. Ridgway Hall has the same floor plan and room dimensions. The 29,000-square-foot Thompson Hall opened in the fall of 2007. It houses 65 students and staff in 16 suites. In fall 2012, Avila opened its fourth residence hall, Avila Hall (later dedicated as Glenna Wylie Hall), a 39,000-square-foot three-story residence hall on the northeast edge of campus. Avila currently has capacity to house up to 390 students on campus.

== Athletics ==
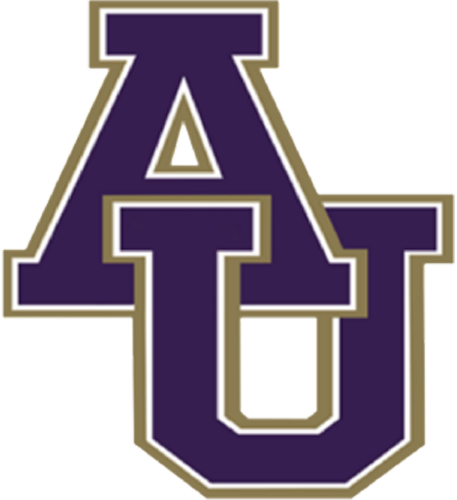
Avila athletics mark

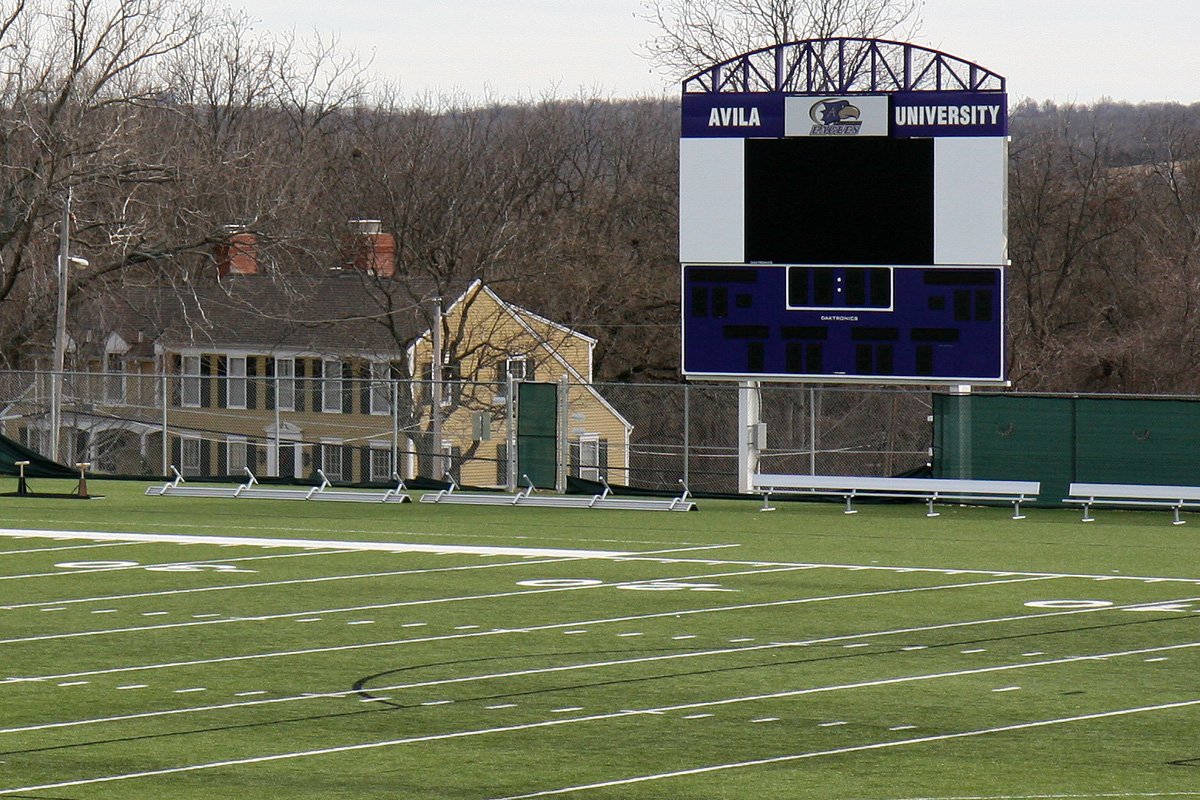
The scoreboard on the south side of the athletic field, installed in 2011

The Avila athletic teams are called the Eagles (formerly known as the "Avalanche" until 1990). The university is a member of the National Association of Intercollegiate Athletics (NAIA), primarily competing in the Kansas Collegiate Athletic Conference (KCAC) since the 2018–19 academic year. The Eagles previously competed in the Heart of America Athletic Conference (HAAC) from 2000–01 to 2017–18; as well as in the defunct Midlands Collegiate Athletic Conference (MCAC) from 1994–95 to 1999–2000.

Avila competes in 17 intercollegiate varsity sports. Men's sports include baseball, basketball, bowling, football, soccer, tennis, volleyball and wrestling; women's sports include basketball, bowling, soccer, softball, tennis, volleyball and wrestling. Avila also has award-winning cheerleading and dance teams.

=== History ===
In 2011, the athletic complex was expanded to provide facilities for football and soccer games to be played on campus. A 194,000 square foot multi-purpose athletic field was constructed, featuring a Shaw Sportexe Legion synthetic turf system. Avila's football team played its first on campus game on September 17, 2011, against Missouri Valley College.
