= 1934 Central Eagles football team =

American college football season

1934 Central Eagles football

MCAU champion
- Conference: Missouri College Athletic Union
- Record: 6–1–2 (3–0 MCAU)
- Head coach: C. A. Clingenpeel (13th season)
- Captain: Bart Randolph and Raymond Groves

1934 Missouri College Athletic Union football standings
	Conf.					Overall
Team	W		L		T	W		L		T
Central (MO) $	3	–	0	–	1	6	–	1	–	2
William Jewell	3	–	1	–	0	4	–	3	–	1
Tarkio	1	–	2	–	1	3	–	4	–	1
Culver–Stockton	1	–	3	–	0	3	–	5	–	0
Missouri Valley	1	–	3	–	0	1	–	7	–	2
$ – Conference champion

The 1934 Central Eagles football team represented Central College (now known as Central Methodist University) as a member of the Missouri College Athletic Union (MCAU) during the 1934 college football season. Led by coach C. A. Clingenpeel in his 13th year, the Eagles compiled an overall record of 6–1–2 with a mark of 3–0 in conference play, winning the conference championship for the third and final time under Clingenpeel's tenure and ending the championship streak of William Jewell, who had won it the prior three years.

== Season summary ==
Central began the season with a night game against rival Missouri Valley on September 28. The game was notable for featuring altered rules developed by Missouri Valley coach Henri Godfriaux. Rather than quarters being based on time (15 minutes was the standard), they were based on the amount of plays, with the quarter changing each time 30 plays had been run. Additionally, the play clock was set to 30 seconds and a forward pass was able to be thrown from anywhere behind the line of scrimmage rather than only from five yards behind it, the latter being a rule now used in the present.

With the field covered in mud, Central ended up winning 2–0 through a safety scored in the fourth quarter. The game was timed at two and a half hours, although several said that it would have been longer if played under the standard time due to the field conditions and amount of penalties.

Following Central's away game against Missouri Valley, they returned home and played the Warrensburg Mules to a scoreless tie, while outgaining them 125 yards to 86 in a non-conference match. Central afterwards defeated Principia 13–0, including a touchdown pass as time expired on October 12. The next week the Eagles made their conference debut, tying Tarkio 7–7. Gale Earp scored Central's only touchdown with Ricketts making the conversion; near the end, they had a chance to score but failed on downs at the Tarkio three-yard line.

After Tarkio, Central played Culver–Stockton at home. They greatly outplayed Culver–Stockton, outgaining them 189 yards to 41 and making 14 first downs to 2, but were only able to score once, with Jack Oliver running in for the game-winning touchdown in the fourth. The Eagles subsequently traveled to Kansas City, to play the Rockhurst Hawks. On a rain-soaked field, they lost 12–8 in their only defeat of the season.

Central then tied Wentworth Military Academy and College, champion of the Missouri Junior College Union, in a night game 20–20, in what was described as "the most thrilling game" at Wentworth's field in years. The Eagles won their next game at William Jewell, the defending champion, 16–13, taking the lead of the Missouri College Athletic Union. They closed out the season with an 18–6 victory over Missouri Valley, clinching the conference championship for the first time since 1930 and taking the crown from William Jewell, who had won it the prior three seasons.

Central also had a reserve team known as the Rinkeydinks. (Note: Central's yearbook recapping the 1934 season misspelled the team as the Rinkedinks.) The Ragout, Central's yearbook, wrote that "If we overlook the Rinke[y]dinks when writing up a Championship team, we have failed to give credit to a group of individuals who deserve no small amount of praise for their part in the success of the season. These men worked hard throughout the year and in the seasons to come will develop into first string players for another Central Championship team."

== Schedule ==
Date	Opponent	Site	Result	Source
September 28	at Missouri Valley	Marshall, MO	W 2–0	
October 5	Warrensburg*	Fayette, MO	T 0–0	
October 12	Principia*	Fayette, MO	W 13–0	
October 19	at Tarkio	Tarkio, MO	T 7–7	
October 26	Culver–Stockton	Fayette, MO	W 6–0	
November 2	at Rockhurst*	Kansas City, MO	L 8–12	
November 9	at Wentworth*	Lexington, MO	T 20–20	
November 16	at William Jewell	Liberty, MO	W 16–13	
November 29	Missouri Valley	Fayette, MO	W 18–6	
*Non-conference game

== Roster ==
The 17 player roster, with notes about each per The Ragout:

- Doug Bourner (Note: Played with several metal braces throughout the season, but was still "a good man for a couple yards any time.)
- Gus Schoene (Note: Described as a "consistent fighter throughout the season" with "plenty of fight and a winning spirit.")
- Raymond Groves (Note: A senior serving as co-captain of the team. Was considered Central's toughest player.)
- Fanny Hurst (Note: Described as "a hard man to get a hold of" who "slid" through the field in "the manner of an eel.")
- Bart Randolph (Note: Co-captain with Raymond Groves. A senior who was the starting quarterback.)
- Hank Bogart (Note: A sophomore who was a "little man who tackles hard.")
- Joe Wommack (Note: An end who could also play quarterback. Was left-handed.)
- Boone Guyton (Note: A wide receiver "dreaded throughout the state" and Central's leading scorer.)
- Gale Earp (Note: Described as player who "thrilled the crowds game after game with his long broken field runs, beautiful punts and rifle-like passes.")
- Leland Schaperkotter (Note: One of Central's top players despite being severely injured for most of the year.)
- Norman Adair (Note: A "midget" who played center and quarterback. Was one of Central's all-conference players.)
- George Smith (Note: A sophomore who "showed up as a real competitor" and "always came through.")
- Bill Kilpatrick (Note: A "hard man to take out" who was "always in the thick of the fight.")
- Syl Albano (Note: A senior who played through numerous injuries.)
- Jack Oliver (Note: Described as a versatile player who was hard to stop, Oliver "saved the day" several times with the Eagles in 1934.)
- Ricketts (Note: A sophomore tackle who also played placekicker, being key in the win over William Jewell.)
- Tom Todd (Note: A key member of the team at tackle who was named captain of the all-conference team.)
