= 1955 Missouri Valley Vikings football team =

American college football season

1955 Missouri Valley Vikings football

MCAU champion Mineral Water Bowl champion

Mineral Water Bowl, W 31–7 vs. Hastings Tangerine Bowl, T 6–6 vs. Juniata
- Conference: Missouri College Athletic Union
- Record: 9–1–1 (1–0 MCAU)
- Head coach: Volney Ashford (16th season)

1955 Missouri College Athletic Union football standings
	Conf.					Overall
Team	W		L		T	W		L		T
Missouri Valley $	1	–	0	–	0	9	–	1	–	1
Tarkio	2	–	1	–	0	5	–	3	–	0
William Jewell	2	–	1	–	0	5	–	4	–	0
Culver–Stockton	1	–	1	–	0	2	–	4	–	3
Central (MO)	0	–	3	–	0	1	–	6	–	1
$ – Conference champion

The 1955 Missouri Valley Vikings football team represented Missouri Valley College as a member of the Missouri College Athletic Union (MCAU) during the 1955 college football season. Led by 16th-year head coach Volney Ashford, the Vikings compiled an overall record of 9–1–1 with a mark of 1–0 in conference play, winning the MCAU title. Missouri Valley was invited to the Mineral Water Bowl, where the Vikings defeated Hastings, and the Tangerine Bowl, where the team tied Juniata.

== Schedule ==
Date	Time	Opponent	Site	Result	Attendance	Source
September 16		Southwest Missouri State*	Marshall, MO	W 14–0		
September 23		at Northeast Missouri State*	Kirksville, MO	W 25–7		
September 30		Millikin*	Marshall, MO	W 33–21		
October 8		at Lewis*	Romeoville, IL	W 19–14		
October 14		Austin Peay*	Marshall, MO	W 20–2		
October 21		at Northwestern Oklahoma State*	Alva, OK	W 21–12		
October 28		William Jewell	Marshall, MO	W 13–0		
November 11		St. Benedict's*	Marshall, MO	W 25–7		
November 19	8:00 p.m.	at McMurry*	Indian Stadium; Abilene, TX	L 6–14		
November 24	2:00 p.m.	vs. Hastings*	Excelsior Springs, MO (Mineral Water Bowl)	W 31–7		
January 2	7:00 p.m.	vs. Juniata*	Tangerine Bowl; Orlando, FL (Tangerine Bowl)	T 6–6	10,000	
*Non-conference game; All times are in Central time
