= C. A. Clingenpeel =

American athlete and coach (1886–1975)

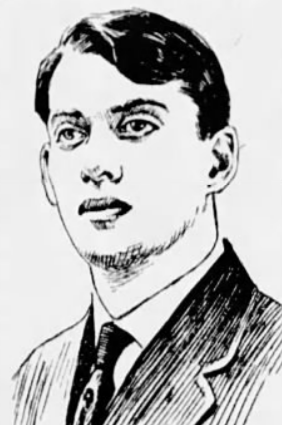

Biographical details
- Born: December 12, 1886; Delphos, Kansas, U.S.
- Died: December 2, 1975 (aged 88); Fayette, Missouri, U.S.

Playing career

Football
- c. 1911: Central (MO)

Baseball
- c. 1911: Central (MO)

Basketball
- c. 1911: Central (MO)
- Positions: Quarterback (football); Catcher (baseball)

Coaching career (HC unless noted)

Football
- 1914–1916: Central (MO)
- 1917: Austin
- 1918–1924: Kemper
- 1925–1940: Central (MO)

Men's basketball
- 1914–1917: Central (MO)
- 1918–1925: Kemper
- 1925–1941: Central (MO)

Women's basketball
- c. 1915: Central (MO)

Track and field
- c. 1916, 1925–c. 1930: Central (MO)

Baseball
- c. 1914, c. 1930: Central (MO)

Administrative career (AD unless noted)
- 1914–1917: Central (MO)
- 1917–1918: Austin
- 1918?–1925: Kemper
- 1925–1941: Central (MO)

Head coaching record
- Overall: 69–81–10 (college football)

Accomplishments and honors

Championships
- Football; 4 MCAU (1926, 1928, 1930, 1934); Basketball; 4 (Note: The Ruston Daily Leader claimed five conference championships in basketball for Clingenpeel, but only four – 1928, 1931, 1932, and 1933 – have been verified.) MCAU (1928, 1931, 1932, 1933)

Awards
- Central Distinguished Alumni Award (1952); NAIA Hall of Fame (1958); Central Methodist Athletic Hall of Fame (1983)

Clarence A. Clingenpeel (December 12, 1886 – December 2, 1975) was an American athlete and sports coach. He was best known for his time at Central College (now known as Central Methodist University), where he played several sports and later coached from 1914 to 1917, and again from 1925 to 1941. Clingenpeel also coached football at Austin College for one year and for seven years he coached football and basketball at Kemper Military School. He was inducted into the NAIA Hall of Fame in 1958 and later into the Central Methodist Hall of Fame in 1983.

== Early life and education ==
Clingenpeel was born on December 12, 1886, in Delphos, Kansas. He attended Central College (now known as Central Methodist University) in Fayette, Missouri, and played several sports there for four years, including football, baseball, and basketball, being a "splendid athlete." He led the football team to a championship in 1911 while playing quarterback and was described in a 1925 article as being widely regarded as the "greatest catcher Central ever had." Prior to his coaching career, Clingenpeel worked for seven years as a journalist for The Kansas City Star.

== Coaching career ==
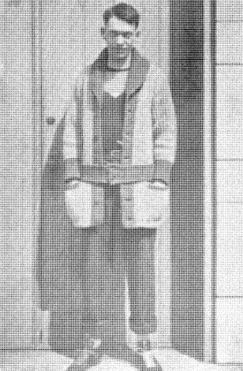
Clingenpeel at the start of his coaching career

In 1914, Clingenpeel was hired as the new athletic director at his alma mater. Among his duties in this position were head football coach, basketball coach, track and field coach, and baseball coach. In his first season as football coach, Clingenpeel led the team to "distinct success" after they had gone through "disappointment" in the past several years, compiling an overall record of 4–3, with wins over Tarkio (21–3), William Jewell (7–0), Kirksville (12–0), and Westminster (53–0), along with losses against Warrensburg (20–7), Drury (35–0), and Missouri Wesleyan (20–7), good enough for a second-place finish in the conference. The Kansas City Star described the team as the best Central had had in years.

In the 1914–15 basketball season, Clingenpeel led his team to an overall record of 3–7, and in baseball, his team compiled the same mark. The following year, he led the football team to a 2–5 record, the men's basketball team to a record of 5–7, the baseball team to a 6–7 mark, and also coached the women's basketball team, which won once in three matches.

After the 1916–17 sports season, Clingenpeel left Central to become the athletic director at Austin College in Sherman, Texas. The Kansas City Star recapped his three-year stint at the school:

Clingenpeel leaves the Missouri conference, in which he has been a fine factor, with a reputation for excellent sportsmanship and proved coaching ability. "Cling" was graduate coach and director at Central for several years and during his regime the Fayette College more than held its own in state conference circles. In addition to the success that crowned his coaching efforts Clingenpeel's teams had an excellent reputation for clean, sportsmanlike play.

Clingenpeel coached the Austin football team in 1917, while athletic director. He resigned in 1918 to become football coach at Kemper Military School. Clingenpeel also became the coach of the basketball team there, and was for a time their athletic director. In his first year as basketball coach, he turned out an "exceptional" team which won the conference championship in a "romp." Clingenpeel also led the football team to within a half-game of the championship in 1919. The next year, they posted one of the best high school seasons ever in that section of the country, according to The Kansas City Star. The Kemper team, although from a high school, played against colleges in Kansas and Missouri and was able to tie several of them.

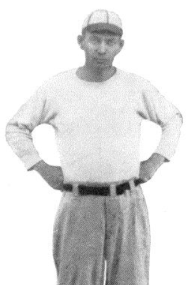
Clingenpeel, c. 1926

Clingenpeel continued serving at Kemper until 1925, when he returned to his alma mater, Central College. One source said that his record at Kemper "is one that will long be noted." He became athletic director, football coach, track and field coach, and basketball coach at Central. Upon becoming football coach, he announced that "We will win one game this year." He was correct in his prediction, but had a "very successful" year otherwise, leading an inexperienced basketball team to the conference runner-up position, and producing a top track team.

Clingenpeel declared that in his second season as football coach, they would win more games. He was again correct, and turned out a team that was among the best in school history, winning the championship, (Note: Central initially compiled a record of 5–2 (5–1 in the Missouri College Athletic Union); however, Westminster, the only team to defeat Central in inter-conference play, later forfeited their win due to the use of ineligible players.) their first in 15 years, despite being outweighed by all their inter-conference opponents. The 1926 Ragout, Central's yearbook, described him as follows: "'Cling' is a shrewd coach, and has his heart and soul in his work. He instills into the veins of his teams that old 'never-give-up' spirit which is so prevalent in an Eagle team. 'Cling' has won a place in the hearts of all his men and also in the hearts of Eagle followers." Another edition discussed him as, "A maker of Champions and Leaders. A master strategist, a splendid athlete, and a gentleman–our coach."

Clingenpeel led both the football and basketball teams to the conference championships in 1928. In the 1930 season, he helped the football team compile a 9–0 mark and win the conference championship, the first unbeaten, untied team in school history. He also led the basketball team to a championship, and became coach of the baseball team around this time. Clingenpeel gave his position as track coach to George Kline around this time. In 1931–32, he led the basketball team to another conference championship, and it was written in The Ragout that championships "have come to be customary instead of occasional acquisitions."

Although the 1932–33 basketball team was very inexperienced, Clingenpeel again led them to the conference title. They did not win it in 1933–34, the first time in four years. Clingenpeel led the football team in 1934 to their first conference championship since 1930. He continued coaching the football and basketball teams until 1941, when he had to stop for a year due to an illness. His health returned in 1942; however, when he went back to continue coaching, the school told him that he had been dismissed. The Kansas City Star sports editor wrote that, "There's something wrong somewhere in a case like that," considering that Clingenpeel had served the college for nearly two decades, took a year off from illness, and was then abruptly notified that he had been dismissed after returning to health. He finished his tenure at Central with four football conference championships and at least four more in basketball.

== Later life and death ==
After being dismissed from Central, Clingenpeel began serving in the personnel department at Pratt & Whitney. He was named director of field activities for the Missouri State Chamber of Commerce in 1945. A few years later, he began operating a news agency bearing his name. Clingenpeel was presented with the Central College Distinguished Alumni Award in 1952. Six years later, he was inducted into the NAIA Hall of Fame. He died of a stroke, on December 2, 1975, in Fayette. Clingenpeel was posthumously inducted into the Central College Hall of Fame in 1983, as a charter member.

== Head coaching record ==
=== College football ===
Year	Team	Overall	Conference	Standing	Bowl/playoffs
Central Eagles (Missouri Intercollegiate Athletic Association) (1914–1916)
1914	Central	4–3			
1915	Central	2–5	2–4	6th	
1916	Central	3–3	3–2	3rd	
Austin Kangaroos (Texas Intercollegiate Athletic Association) (1917)
1917	Austin	0–7			
Austin:		0–7			
Central Eagles (Missouri College Athletic Union) (1925–1940)
1925	Central	1–6–1	0–5–1	T–9th	
1926	Central	6–1	6–0	1st	
1927	Central	6–2	4–1	3rd	
1928	Central	8–2	6–0	1st	
1929	Central	5–3	4–2	T–3rd	
1930	Central	9–0	6–0	1st	
1931	Central	4–4–1	3–3–1	4th	
1932	Central	5–3	3–2	3rd	
1933	Central	1–5–1	1–2–1	4th	
1934	Central	6–1–2	3–0–1	1st	
1935	Central	3–6	2–2	T–3rd	
1936	Central	0–9	0–4	5th	
1937	Central	1–6–1	1–3	T–4th	
1938	Central	2–4–2	1–1–2	2nd	
1939	Central	2–5–1	1–3	T–4th	
1940	Central	2–5–1	2–1–1	2nd	
Central:		69–74–10			
Total:		69–81–10			
National championship Conference title Conference division title or championship game berth
