= 1948 Missouri Valley Vikings football team =

American college football season

1948 Missouri Valley Vikings football

MCAU champion

Refrigerator Bowl, L 7–13 vs. Evansville Cigar Bowl, T 13–13 vs. St. Thomas (MN)
- Conference: Missouri College Athletic Union
- Record: 9–1–1 (4–0 MCAU)
- Head coach: Volney Ashford (9th season)

1948 Missouri College Athletic Union football standings
	Conf.					Overall
Team	W		L		T	W		L		T
Missouri Valley $	4	–	0	–	0	9	–	1	–	1
Culver–Stockton	3	–	1	–	0	4	–	5	–	0
Central (MO)	2	–	2	–	0	5	–	3	–	0
William Jewell	1	–	3	–	0	3	–	6	–	0
Tarkio	0	–	4	–	0	2	–	5	–	0
$ – Conference champion

The 1948 Missouri Valley Vikings football team was an American football team that represented Missouri Valley College as a member of the Missouri College Athletic Union (MCAU) during the 1948 college football season. In their ninth season under head coach Volney Ashford, the Vikings compiled a perfect 9–0 record in the regular season, won the MCAU championship, lost to Evansville in the Refrigerator Bowl, tied with the St. Thomas Tommies in the Cigar Bowl, and outscored all opponents by a total of 327 to 52.

During the season, Missouri Valley broke the all-time collegiate record of 39 consecutive wins. The 1948 season marked the end of a 41-game winning streak (1941–1942, 1946–1948) that still ranks as the fifth longest in college football history. (Note: The United States Navy took over the Missouri Valley College during World War II. While the Navy fielded V-12 Navy College Training Program football teams under the Missouri Valley name in 1943 and 1944, the V-12 teams played with different coaches and players, and are not counted as part of the Missouri Valley Vikings football program's record.) Coach Ashford, who led the team during the streak, was later inducted into the College Football Hall of Fame.

Missouri Valley was ranked at No. 153 in the final Litkenhous Difference by Score System ratings for 1948.

== Schedule ==
Date	Opponent	Site	Result	Attendance	Source
September 17	at Bethany (KS)*	Lindsborg, KS	W 25–0		
September 24	Kirksville State*	Marshall, MO	W 20–0		
September 30	Ottawa*	Marshall, MO	W 21–0		
October 15	Central (MO)	Marshall, MO	W 7–6		
October 22	Central Missouri State*	Marshall, MO	W 34–7		
October 29	at Culver–Stockton	Canton, MO	W 47–0		
November 5	Tarkio	Marshall, MO	W 87–0		
November 12	William Jewell	Marshall, MO	W 46–0		
November 25	McMurry*	Marshall, MO	W 20–13		
December 4	at Evansville*	Reitz Stadium; Evansville, IN (Refrigerator Bowl)	L 7–13	7,500	
January 1, 1949	vs. St. Thomas (MN)*	Phillips Field; Tampa, FL (Cigar Bowl)	T 13–13	11,000	
*Non-conference game
