= 1946 Missouri Valley Vikings football team =

American college football season

1946 Missouri Valley Vikings football

MCAU champion
- Conference: Missouri College Athletic Union
- Record: 10–0 (4–0 MCAU)
- Head coach: Volney Ashford (7th season)

1946 Missouri College Athletic Union football standings
	Conf.					Overall
Team	W		L		T	W		L		T
Missouri Valley $	4	–	0	–	0	10	–	0	–	0
Central (MO)	2	–	1	–	1	4	–	3	–	1
William Jewell	2	–	2	–	0	4	–	5	–	0
Culver–Stockton	1	–	3	–	0	4	–	4	–	0
Tarkio	0	–	3	–	1	0	–	7	–	1
$ – Conference champion

The 1946 Missouri Valley Vikings football team was an American football team that represented Missouri Valley College as a member of the Missouri College Athletic Union (MCAU) during the 1946 college football season. In their seventh season under head coach Volney Ashford, the Vikings compiled a perfect 10–0 record (4–0 against MCAU teams), won the MCAU championship, shut out five of ten opponents, and outscored all opponents by a total of 387 to 33.

The season was part of a 41-game winning streak (1941–1942, 1946–1948) that still ranks as the fifth longest in college football history. (Note: The United States Navy took over the Missouri Valley College during World War II. While the Navy fielded V-12 Navy College Training Program football teams under the Missouri Valley name in 1943 and 1944, the V-12 teams played with different coaches and players, and are not counted as part of the Missouri Valley Vikings football program's record.) Coach Ashford, who led the team during the streak, was later inducted into the College Football Hall of Fame.

Missouri Valley halfback Alva Baker ranked seventh nationally in scoring among small-college players with 84 points scored. Eleven Missouri Valley players received honors from the Associated Press (AP) on the All-MCAU football team, six on the first team and five on the second team. The honorees included Alva Baker at halfback (AP-1); Ted Chittwood at end (AP-1); Jim Nelson (AP-1) and Verlie Harris (AP-1) at the guard position; Bill Klein at center (AP-2).

Missouri Valley's roster also included back Hugh C. Dunn, who lost his left hand due to injuries suffered in a German mortar attack during World War II.

During the fall of 1946, Missouri Valley College had only 513 students, 322 of which were freshmen.

== Schedule ==
Date	Opponent	Site	Result	Attendance	Source
September 20	Sterling*	Marshall, MO	W 37–0		
September 26	Chillicothe Business College*	Marshall, MO	W 65–0		
October 4	Simpson*		W 34–6		
October 11	at Tarkio	Tarkio, MO	W 27–0		
October 18	at William Jewell	Liberty, MO	W 47–7		
October 25	Shurtleff*	Marshall, MO	W 39–0		
November 1	Central (MO)	Marshall, MO	W 25–7		
November 8	Culver–Stockton	Canton, MO	W 47–0		
November 15	McPherson*	Marshall, MO	W 32–6		
November 22	Rockhurst*	Marshall, MO	W 34–7	2,500	
*Non-conference game
