= 1961 Missouri Valley Vikings football team =

American college football season

1961 Missouri Valley Vikings football

MCAU champion
- Conference: Missouri College Athletic Union
- Record: 9–0–1 (4–0 MCAU)
- Head coach: Volney Ashford (22nd season)
- Home stadium: Gregg-Mitchell Field

1961 Missouri College Athletic Union football standings
	Conf.					Overall
Team	W		L		T	W		L		T
No. 19 Missouri Valley $	4	–	0	–	0	9	–	0	–	1
William Jewell	3	–	1	–	0	7	–	3	–	0
Graceland	3	–	2	–	0	5	–	2	–	2
Tarkio	2	–	3	–	0	2	–	7	–	0
Central (MO)	0	–	2	–	1	1	–	6	–	1
Culver–Stockton	0	–	4	–	1	1	–	6	–	2
$ – Conference champion; Rankings from NAIA poll

The 1961 Missouri Valley Vikings football team was an American football that represented Missouri Valley College as a member of the Missouri College Athletic Union (MCAU) during the 1961 college football season. In their 22nd year under head coach Volney Ashford, the Vikings compiled a 9–0–1 record (4–0 in conference games), won the MCAU championship, and outscored opponents by a total of 251 to 79.

== Schedule ==
Date	Opponent	Site	Result	Attendance	Source
September 9	vs. St. Mary of the Plains*	Raytown High School Stadium; Raytown, MO	W 13–12	1,200	
September 16	at Northwestern Oklahoma State*	Alva, OK	W 14–6		
September 30	Southwest Missouri State*	Gregg-Mitchell Field; Marshall, MO	T 7–7		
October 7	William Penn*	Gregg-Mitchell Field; Marshall, MO	W 35–14		
October 14	vs. Concordia (NE)*	Sedalia, MO (Sedalie Rotary Club benefit game)	W 25–7		
October 21	at William Jewell	Liberty, MO	W 39–6		
October 28	at Graceland	Lamont, IA	W 27–20		
November 4	at Tarkio	Tarkio, MO	W 12–0		
November 11	Culver–Stockton^{†}	Gregg-Mitchell Field; Marshall, MO	W 41–0		
November 18	Memphis Naval Air Station*	Gregg-Mitchell Field; Marshall, MO	W 38–7		
*Non-conference game; ^{†}Homecoming
