= 1947 Missouri Valley Vikings football team =

American college football season

1947 Missouri Valley Vikings football

MCAU champion

Boy's Ranch Bowl, W 20–13 vs. McMurry Cigar Bowl, W 26–7 vs. West Chester
- Conference: Missouri College Athletic Union
- Record: 12–0 (4–0 MCAU)
- Head coach: Volney Ashford (8th season)

1947 Missouri College Athletic Union football standings
| | Conf. | | | | | Overall |
| Team | W | | L | | T | W | | L | | T |
|---|---|---|---|---|---|---|---|---|---|---|
| Missouri Valley $ | 4 | – | 0 | – | 0 | 12 | – | 0 | – | 0 |
| Central (MO) | 2 | – | 2 | – | 0 | 5 | – | 4 | – | 0 |
| Culver–Stockton | 2 | – | 2 | – | 0 | 4 | – | 4 | – | 0 |
| William Jewell | 2 | – | 2 | – | 0 | 3 | – | 6 | – | 1 |
| Tarkio | 0 | – | 4 | – | 0 | 3 | – | 5 | – | 0 |
$ – Conference champion

The 1947 Missouri Valley Vikings football team was an American football team that represented Missouri Valley College as a member of the Missouri College Athletic Union (MCAU) during the 1947 college football season. In their eighth season under head coach Volney Ashford, the Vikings compiled a perfect 12–0 record (4–0 against MCAU teams), won the MCAU championship and two bowl games, and outscored all opponents by a total of 372 to 98.

In the final Litkenhous Ratings released in mid-December, Missouri Valley was ranked at No. 136 out of 500 college football teams.

The season was part of a 41-game winning streak (1941–1942, 1946–1948) that still ranks as the fifth longest in college football history. (Note: The United States Navy took over the Missouri Valley College during World War II. While the Navy fielded V-12 Navy College Training Program football teams under the Missouri Valley name in 1943 and 1944, the V-12 teams played with different coaches and players, and are not counted as part of the Missouri Valley Vikings football program's record.) Coach Ashford, who led the team during the streak, was later inducted into the College Football Hall of Fame.

== Schedule ==
| Date | Time | Opponent | Site | Result | Attendance | Source |
|---|---|---|---|---|---|---|
| September 27 | 2:30 p.m. | at Washington University | St. Louis, MO | W 28–13 | 9,000 | |
| October 2 | | Ottawa (KS) | Marshall, MO | W 32–6 | | |
| October 10 | | Shurtleff* | Marshall, MO | W 34–12 | | |
| October 17 | | at Central (MO) | Fayette, MO | W 27–14 | | |
| October 24 | | at Central Missouri State | Warrensburg, MO | W 21–6 | | |
| October 31 | | Culver–Stockton | Marshall, MO | W 33–7 | | |
| November 7 | | at Tarkio | Tarkio, MO | W 60–6 | | |
| November 14 | | William Jewell | Marshall, MO | W 31–0 | | |
| November 21 | | vs. Rockhurst* | Kansas City, MO | W 21–7 | | |
| November 27 | | Bethany (KS) | Marshall, MO | W 39–7 | | |
| December 13 | | at McMurry | Abilene, TX (Boy's Ranch Bowl) | W 20–13 | | |
| January 1, 1948 | 1:00 p.m. | vs. West Chester | Phillips Field; Tampa, FL (Cigar Bowl) | W 26–7 | 10,000 | |
*Non-conference game; All times are in Central time
