= Don Ping =

American football and baseball coach

Biographical details
- Born: November 5, 1898; Newton, Illinois, U.S.
- Died: July 4, 1972 (aged 73); Evansville, Indiana, U.S.

Playing career

Baseball
- 1921: Millikin
- 1922: Fort Smith Twins
- 1923: Terre Haute Tots
- 1923–1924: Decatur Commodores
- 1925: Springfield Senators
- Position: Catcher

Coaching career (HC unless noted)

Football
- 1922–1923: Carrollton HS (KY)
- 1924–1929: Marshall HS (IL)
- 1930–1945: Reitz Memorial HS (IN)
- 1946–1953: Evansville

Baseball
- 1947–1966: Evansville

Head coaching record
- Overall: 38–35–5 (college football); 128–191–3 (college baseball)
- Bowls: 2–0

Accomplishments and honors

Championships
- Football; 2 OVC (1948–1949)

Donald Wilson Ping (November 5, 1898 – July 4, 1972) was an American football and baseball coach. He served as the head football coach at the University of Evansville in Evansville, Indiana from 1946 to 1953, compiling a record of 38–35–5. Ping was also the head baseball coach at Evansville from 1947 to 1966, tallying a mark of 128–191–3.

Ping played college baseball at Millikin University in Decatur, Illinois. He died on July 4, 1972, at Deaconess Hospital in Evansville.

== Head coaching record ==
=== College football ===
| Year | Team | Overall | Conference | Standing | Bowl/playoffs |
|---|---|---|---|---|---|
Evansville Purple Aces (Indiana Intercollegiate Conference) (1946)
| 1946 | Evansville | 7–1–2 | 2–0 | 2nd | |
Evansville Purple Aces (Independent) (1947)
| 1947 | Evansville | 4–4–1 | | | |
Evansville Purple Aces (Ohio Valley Conference) (1948–1950)
| 1948 | Evansville | 6–3 | 3–1 | T–1st | W Refrigerator |
| 1949 | Evansville | 8–2–1 | 3–1–1 | 3rd (Note: Evansville finished the 1949 season with the third-best record in Ohio Valley Conference (OVC), but the Purple Aces were declared the conference champion because Marshall and Louisville (3–0) did not play enough conference games to qualify for the title.) | W Refrigerator |
| 1950 | Evansville | 3–6–1 | 1–4–1 | 6th | |
Evansville Purple Aces (Indiana Collegiate Conference / Ohio Valley Conference) (1951)
| 1951 | Evansville | 5–5 | 1–1 / 3–3 | 4th / T–4th | |
Evansville Purple Aces (Indiana Collegiate Conference) (1952–1953)
| 1952 | Evansville | 2–7 | 2–3 | 5th | |
| 1953 | Evansville | 3–7 | 2–3 | T–4th | |
| Evansville: | | 38–35–5 | 17–16–2 | | |
| Total: | | 38–35–5 | | | |
National championship Conference title Conference division title or championship game berth
