= Volney Ashford =

American football player and coach (1907–1973)

Biographical details
- Born: November 15, 1907; Chicago, Illinois, U.S.
- Died: October 14, 1973 (aged 65); Marshall, Missouri, U.S.

Playing career

Football
- 1927–1929: Missouri Valley
- Position: Quarterback

Coaching career (HC unless noted)

Football
- 1931: Missouri Valley (assistant)
- 1932–1936: Harrisonville HS (MO)
- 1937–1942: Missouri Valley
- 1946–1967: Missouri Valley

Head coaching record
- Overall: 197–55–12 (college football); 25–12–4 (high school football)
- Bowls: 3–3–3

Accomplishments and honors

Championships
- 13 MCAU (1939, 1941–1942, 1946–1949, 1951–1952, 1954–1955, 1958, 1960–1961)

Awards
- NAIA Coach of the Year (1958)
- College Football Hall of Fame; Inducted in 2009 (profile)

Volney C. Ashford (November 15, 1907 – October 14, 1973) was an American football coach. He served as the head coach at Missouri Valley College for 28 season, from 1937 to 1942 and again from 1946 to 1967. He led the Missouri Valley Vikings to nine bowl games, including the Mineral Water Bowl in 1955 and the 1956 Tangerine Bowl.

Ashford left Missouri Valley during World War II to serve in the United States Navy. He was commissioned a lieutenant junior grade and left for the North Carolina Pre-Flight School at Chapel Hill, North Carolina in the spring of 1943. Ashford was later stationed at Iowa City, Iowa and returned to Missouri Valley in December 1945.

Ashford died of a heart attack on October 14, 1973. He was inducted into the College Football Hall of Fame in 2009.

== Head coaching record ==
=== College football ===
Year	Team	Overall	Conference	Standing	Bowl/playoffs
Missouri Valley Vikings (Missouri College Athletic Union) (1937–1942)
1937	Missouri Valley	3–4–1	1–3	T–4th	
1938	Missouri Valley	5–3–1	1–2–1	T–3rd	
1939	Missouri Valley	7–1	3–1	T–1st	
1940	Missouri Valley	2–5–1	2–2	3rd	
1941	Missouri Valley	7–2	3–0	1st	
1942	Missouri Valley	9–0	4–0	1st	
Missouri Valley Vikings (Missouri College Athletic Union) (1946–1967)
1946	Missouri Valley	10–0	4–0	1st	
1947	Missouri Valley	12–0	4–0	1st	W Boys' Ranch Bowl, W Cigar
1948	Missouri Valley	9–1–1	4–0	1st	L Refrigerator, T Cigar
1949	Missouri Valley	8–3	3–0	1st	L Oleander Bowl
1950	Missouri Valley	8–2	2–1	2nd	
1951	Missouri Valley	10–1	4–0	1st	
1952	Missouri Valley	6–4	4–0	1st	
1953	Missouri Valley	7–1–1	3–1	2nd	T Cigar
1954	Missouri Valley	7–1–2	2–0–1	T–1st	
1955	Missouri Valley	9–1–1	1–0	1st	W Mineral Water, T Tangerine
1956	Missouri Valley	8–2–1	0–0–1	T–3rd	
1957	Missouri Valley	4–2	0–0	NA	
1958	Missouri Valley	8–1	3–0	1st	L Tangerine
1959	Missouri Valley	7–2	2–1	2nd	
1960	Missouri Valley	7–1–1	3–0–1	T–1st	
1961	Missouri Valley	9–0–1	4–0	1st	
1962	Missouri Valley	6–3	3–1	2nd	
1963	Missouri Valley	5–4	3–1	2nd	
1964	Missouri Valley	7–2	3–1	2nd	
1965	Missouri Valley	4–5	3–1	2nd	
1966	Missouri Valley	6–3	1–1	4th	
1967	Missouri Valley	6–4	1–1	T–3rd	
Missouri Valley:		196–58–11	71–17–4		
Total:		196–58–11			
National championship Conference title Conference division title or championship game berth
