= 1942 Missouri Valley Vikings football team =

American college football season

1942 Missouri Valley Vikings football

MCAU champion
- Conference: Missouri College Athletic Union
- Record: 9–0 (4–0 MCAU)
- Head coach: Volney Ashford (6th season)

1942 Missouri College Athletic Union football standings
	Conf.					Overall
Team	W		L		T	W		L		T
Missouri Valley $	4	–	0	–	0	9	–	0	–	0
William Jewell	2	–	1	–	0	4	–	3	–	1
Culver–Stockton	1	–	1	–	1	3	–	3	–	1
Central (MO)	0	–	2	–	1	4	–	3	–	1
Tarkio	0	–	3	–	0	2	–	6	–	0
$ – Conference champion

The 1942 Missouri Valley Vikings football team was an American football team that represented Missouri Valley College as a member of the Missouri College Athletic Union (MCAU) during the 1942 college football season. In their sixth season under head coach Volney Ashford, the Vikings compiled a perfect 9–0 record (4–0 against MCAU teams), won the MCAU championship, and outscored opponents by a total of 391 to 59.

Missouri Valley was ranked at No. 117 (out of 590 college and military teams) in the final rankings under the Litkenhous Difference by Score System for 1942.

The season was part of a 41-game winning streak (1941–1942, 1946–1948) that still ranks as the fifth longest in college football history. (Note: The United States Navy took over the Missouri Valley College during World War II. While the Navy fielded V-12 Navy College Training Program football teams under the Missouri Valley name in 1943 and 1944, the V-12 teams played with different coaches and players, and are not counted as part of the Missouri Valley Vikings football program's record.) Coach Ashford, who led the team during the streak, was later inducted into the College Football Hall of Fame.

== Schedule ==
Date	Time	Opponent	Site	Result	Attendance	Source
September 25		Kemper*	Marshall, MO	W 53–6		
October 2		Central Missouri State*	Marshall, MO	W 31–14		
October 9		Culver–Stockton	Marshall, MO	W 39–7		
October 16		at William Jewell	Liberty, MO	W 59–0		
October 30		Central (MO)	Marshall, MO	W 55–13		
November 6		Tarkio	Marshall, MO	W 33–0		
November 11		at Chillicothe Business School*	Chillicothe, MO (Armistice Day)	W 26–12		
November 14	8:00 p.m.	at Rockhurst*	Bourke Field; Kansas City, MO	W 33–7		
November 26		Central (MO)*	Marshall, MO	W 62–0		
*Non-conference game; All times are in Central time
