= 1958 Tangerine Bowl (December) =

American college football game

Missouri Valley Vikings	East Texas State Lions
(8–0)	(9–1)
Missouri College Athletic Union	Lone Star Conference
7	26
Head coach: Volney Ashford	Head coach: Jules V. Sikes
	1	2	3	4	Total
Missouri Valley	0	7	0	0	7
East Texas State	0	12	0	14	26
- Date: December 27, 1958
- Season: 1958
- Stadium: Tangerine Bowl
- Location: Orlando, Florida
- MVP: Sam McCord, East Texas State
- Attendance: 4000

The 1958 Tangerine Bowl (December) was an American college football bowl game played on December 27, 1958 at the Tangerine Bowl stadium in Orlando, Florida. The game pitted the Missouri Valley Vikings and the East Texas State Lions (now East Texas A&M University). This was the first time the bowl was played before New Year's Day, as organizers wanted to "attract television coverage in the future". The December game date made this the second of two Tangerine Bowls played in calendar year 1958.

== Background ==
The University at Buffalo's first bowl bid was to this game. The Tangerine Bowl Commission hoped that the Orlando High School Athletic Association (OHSAA), which operated the stadium, would waive its rule that prohibited integrated sporting events. When it refused, the team unanimously voted to skip the bowl because its two black players (halfback Willie Evans and end Mike Wilson) would not have been allowed on the field.

Missouri Valley entered the game with an 8–0 record, and had previously played to a tie in the 1956 Tangerine Bowl. East Texas State entered the game with a 9–1 record, and had recorded two wins and a tie in three prior Tangerine Bowl appearances.

== Game summary ==
In wet conditions, the teams played a scoreless first quarter. In the second quarter, East Texas scored first but missed the extra point, allowing Missouri Valley to take a 7–6 lead when they scored a touchdown and converted their extra point. East Texas scored another touchdown, but again missed the extra point, and had a 12–7 lead at halftime. After a scoreless third quarter, East Texas scored two touchdowns in the fourth quarter, successfully making one two-point conversion, to win by a final score of 26–7.

== Scoring summary ==
Scoring summary

Quarter	Time	Drive			Team	Scoring information	Score	
Quarter	Time	Plays	Yards	TOP	Team	Scoring information	MVC	ETSC
2		13	89		ETSC	Joe Harbour 2-yard touchdown run, Jim Reed kick wide	0	6
2		13	73		MVC	Mel Rogers 1-yard touchdown run, Ray Mosey kick good	7	6
2			93		ETSC	Ray Berry recovered offensive fumble in the end zone, kick failed	7	12
4		7	41		ETSC	Dan Malone 3-yard touchdown reception from Sam McCord, 2-point pass good (Norman Roberts from Sam McCord)	7	20
4					ETSC	Interception returned 53 yards for touchdown by Tony Mandina, 2-point pass failed	7	26
"TOP" = time of possession. For other American football terms, see Glossary of American football.							7	26

== Aftermath ==
East Texas would not play again in the postseason until 1972, when they won the NAIA Football National Championship. They then joined NCAA Division II, and have subsequently made several playoff appearances there. Missouri Valley's next postseason appearance would be the Mineral Water Bowl in 1971. They have subsequently appeared several times in the NAIA's postseason playoffs. The University at Buffalo would not appear in a bowl game until the 2009 International Bowl.
