= Kenneth Robb =

American football coach

Coaching career (HC unless noted)
- 1954–1961: Culver–Stockton
- 1962: Central Missouri State (assistant)
- 1963–1965: Central Missouri State

Head coaching record
- Overall: 36–55–7

Accomplishments and honors

Championships
- 1 MCAU (1957)

Kenneth Robb was an American football coach. He served as the head football coach at Culver–Stockton College in Canton, Missouri from 1954 to 1961 and Central Missouri State College—know known as the University of Central Missouri —in Warrensburg, Missouri from 1963 to 1965, compiling a career college football coaching record of 36–55–7.

== Head coaching record ==
Year	Team	Overall	Conference	Standing	Bowl/playoffs
Culver–Stockton Wildcats (Missouri College Athletic Union) (1954–1961)
1954	Culver–Stockton	2–5	0–2	5th	
1955	Culver–Stockton	2–4–3	1–1	4th	
1956	Culver–Stockton	5–3	1–1	T–3rd	
1957	Culver–Stockton	7–2	2–0	1st	
1958	Culver–Stockton	5–5	2–2	3rd	
1959	Culver–Stockton	6–3–1	1–2–1	T–3rd	
1960	Culver–Stockton	4–5	3–2	3rd	
1961	Culver–Stockton	1–6–2	0–4–1	5th	
Culver–Stockton:		32–33–6	10–14–2		
Central Missouri State Mules (Missouri Intercollegiate Athletic Association) (1963–1965)
1963	Central Missouri State	1–8	1–4	T–4th	
1964	Central Missouri State	1–8	0–5	6th	
1965	Central Missouri State	2–6–1	1–4	5th	
Central Missouri State:		4–22–1	2–13		
Total:		36–55–7			
National championship Conference title Conference division title or championship game berth
