= 1949 Missouri Valley Vikings football team =

American college football season

1949 Missouri Valley Vikings football

MCAU champion

Oleander Bowl, L 13–19 vs. McMurry
- Conference: Missouri College Athletic Union
- Record: 8–3 (3–0 MCAU)
- Head coach: Volney Ashford (10th season)
- Offensive scheme: Short punt, single-wing
- Home stadium: Gregg-Mitchell Field

1949 Missouri College Athletic Union football standings
	Conf.					Overall
Team	W		L		T	W		L		T
Missouri Valley $	3	–	0	–	0	8	–	3	–	0
Central (MO)	2	–	1	–	0	8	–	1	–	0
William Jewell	1	–	2	–	0	3	–	7	–	0
Culver–Stockton	0	–	3	–	0	3	–	6	–	0
$ – Conference champion

The 1949 Missouri Valley Vikings football team represented Missouri Valley College as a member of the Missouri College Athletic Union (MCAU) during the 1949 college football season. Led by 10th-year head coach Volney Ashford, the Vikings compiled an overall record of 8–3 with a mark of 3–0 in conference play, winning the MCAU title. Missouri Valley was invited to the Oleander Bowl, where the Vikings lost to McMurry. The team played home games at Gregg-Mitchell Field in Marshall, Missouri.

== Schedule ==
Date	Time	Opponent	Site	Result	Attendance	Source
September 16	8:00 p.m.	Bethany (KS)*	Gregg-Mitchell Field; Marshall, MO	W 28–6	3,000	
September 23	8:00 p.m.	at Northeast Missouri State*	Stokes Stadium; Kirksville, MO	W 27–7	1,500	
September 29	8:00 p.m.	vs. Ottawa (KS)*	Blues Stadium; Kansas City, MO	W 20–6	5,000–6,000	
October 7	8:00 p.m.	Evansville*	Gregg-Mitchell Field; Marshall, MO	L 7–17	5,000	
October 14	7:30 p.m.	at Central (MO)	Davis Field; Fayette, MO	W 20–6	4,000	
October 21	8:00 p.m.	at Central Missouri State*	Warrensburg, MO	W 15–0	2,000	
October 27	8:00 p.m.	Culver–Stockton	Gregg-Mitchell Field; Marshall, MO	W 65–6	3,000	
November 11	2:00 p.m.	William Jewell^{†}	Gregg-Mitchell Field; Marshall, MO	W 62–0	3,500	
November 18		at Arkansas State*	Kays Stadium; Jonesboro, AR	L 6–7	2,000	
November 24	2:00 p.m.	College of Emporia*	Gregg-Mitchell Field; Marshall, MO	W 62–0	3,500	
January 2	2:00 p.m.	vs. McMurry*	Public School Stadium; Galveston, TX (Oleander Bowl)	L 13–19	7,500	
*Non-conference game; ^{†}Homecoming; All times are in Central time
