= Jack Fascinato =

- Born: 11 September 1915
- Died: 25 December 1994 (aged 79)

Jack Fascinato (1915–1994) was an American composer, small orchestra leader, arranger, and pianist best known for his work in early television. By the 1960s, he worked primarily in commercials and often with producer Ken Snyder. In that capacity, Fascinato scored or arranged several animated or film inserts for the television series Sesame Street.

== Early years ==
Fascinato was a Missouri native who graduated from Culver-Stockton College and attended the American Conservatory of Music in Chicago. While he was a student at Culver-Stockton he led a band composed of students from the college. The group played for events on- and off-campus, including radio broadcasts for a station in Jefferson City, Missouri.

== Career ==
Fascinato was a frequent performer and arranger on Chicago radio, often working with The Dinning Sisters trio on various series. He was the musical director for Starring Curt Massey (1943), and then spent a stint in the US Navy. In 1948, after musicians' union head James Petrillo lifted a ban keeping musicians from performing live on television, Fascinato became musical director on Burr Tillstrom's Kukla, Fran and Ollie, playing piano accompaniment, arranging music for the occasional operettas (such as The Mikado), and writing songs for the puppet stars. He also backed Kukla star Fran Allison on The Fran Allison Show (1949).

When Tillstrom moved networks in 1954, NBC employee Fascinato remained behind, but soon began another notable collaboration, with singer Tennessee Ernie Ford. He was Ford's musical director, and occasionally performed on-camera, from his first daytime series in 1955, and remained with him through his last series in 1965, and on occasional specials. They also worked together on records, with Fascinato arranging many hymns and folk songs for Ford (including his hit single "Sixteen Tons") into the 1970s. Fascinato also released a few jazz-heavy albums of his own.

In animation, Fascinato scored the "Dusty of the Circus" segments for The Gerald McBoing-Boing Show (1956). In the 1960s, Fascinato teamed with Ken Snyder, writing themes, songs, and scoring filmed inserts for the educational series The Funny Company, as well as music for the cartoon series Skyhawks, Hot Wheels, and many commercials. For Ken Snyder Enterprises, Fascinato wrote campaign songs for John F. Kennedy and Barry Goldwater.

== Personal life ==
Fascinato and his wife had two daughters.
