= Jack Petoskey =

American football player and coach (1921–2017)

Biographical details
- Born: October 15, 1921; Saginaw, Michigan, U.S.
- Died: March 3, 2017 (aged 95); Zephyrhills, Florida, U.S.

Playing career
- 1941–1943: Michigan
- Position: End

Coaching career (HC unless noted)
- 1947–1948: St. Joseph HS (MI)
- 1949–1950: Hillsdale
- 1953–1956: Western Michigan

Head coaching record
- Overall: 19–32–3 (college); 7–5–3 (high school)
- Bowls: 0–1

Accomplishments and honors

Championships
- 1 MIAA (1949)

Ernest Jack Petoskey (October 15, 1921 – March 3, 2017) was an American football player and coach. He served as the head football coach at Hillsdale College from 1949 to 1950 and Western Michigan University from 1953 to 1956, compiling a career college football record of 19–32–3. A native of Dearborn, Michigan, Petoskey played college football at an end at the University of Michigan from 1940 to 1943. He then served in the United States Navy during World War II.

== Coaching career ==
Petoskey was the head football coach for the Hillsdale College in Hillsdale, Michigan. He held that position for the 1949 and 1950 seasons. His coaching record at Hillsdale was 11–7–1. Before going to Hillsdale he was head football coach at St. Joseph High School in St. Joseph, Michigan from 1947 to 1948, where his record was 7–5–3. He was an assistant at Western Michigan before being named head coach.

== Head coaching record ==
=== College ===
Year	Team	Overall	Conference	Standing	Bowl/playoffs
Hillsdale Dales (Michigan Intercollegiate Athletic Association) (1949–1950)
1949	Hillsdale	9–1	5–0	1st	L Refrigerator
1950	Hillsdale	2–6–1	1–3–1	5th	
Hillsdale:		11–7–1	6–3–1		
Western Michigan Broncos (Mid-American Conference) (1953–1956)
1953	Western Michigan	1–6–1	0–4–1	6th	
1954	Western Michigan	4–5	3–4	5th	
1955	Western Michigan	1–7–1	0–5	7th	
1956	Western Michigan	2–7	1–4	6th	
Western Michigan:		8–25–2	4–17–1		
Total:		19–32–3			
National championship Conference title Conference division title or championship game berth
