= Fran Allison =

American performer (1907–1989)

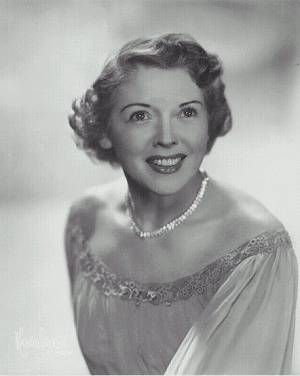
- Allison in 1953
- Born: Frances Helen Allison; November 20, 1907; La Porte City, Iowa, U.S.
- Died: June 13, 1989 (aged 81); Sherman Oaks, California, U.S.
- Years active: 1937–1980s
- Spouse: Archie Levington (m. 1940; died 1978)

Frances Helen Allison (November 20, 1907 – June 13, 1989) was an American television and radio comedienne, personality, and singer.

She is best known for her starring role on the weekday NBC-TV puppet show Kukla, Fran and Ollie, which ran from 1947 to 1957, occasionally returning to the air until the mid-1980s. The trio also hosted The CBS Children's Film Festival, introducing international children's films, from 1967 to 1977.

== Biography ==
=== Early years ===
Frances Helen Allison was born to Jesse Louis Allison and Anna M. "Nan" (née Halpin) Allison in La Porte City, Iowa, where her father worked as a clerk in a grocery store until his stroke in 1913. They then moved in with her paternal grandparents, David Allison, a Civil War veteran, and Susan (née Booth) Allison. Their house still stands on Sycamore Street in LaPorte City.

A 1927 graduate of Coe College, she was a member of Alpha Gamma Delta. She was a fourth-grade teacher for four years in Schleswig and Pocahontas (both in Iowa), before beginning her broadcasting career at WMT in Cedar Rapids, Iowa. (Another source describes WMT as "Waterloo radio station WMT." It moved to Cedar Rapids in 1935.) In 1934, Allison was among "14 sectional winners in the Hollywood Hotel radio contest."

=== Radio ===
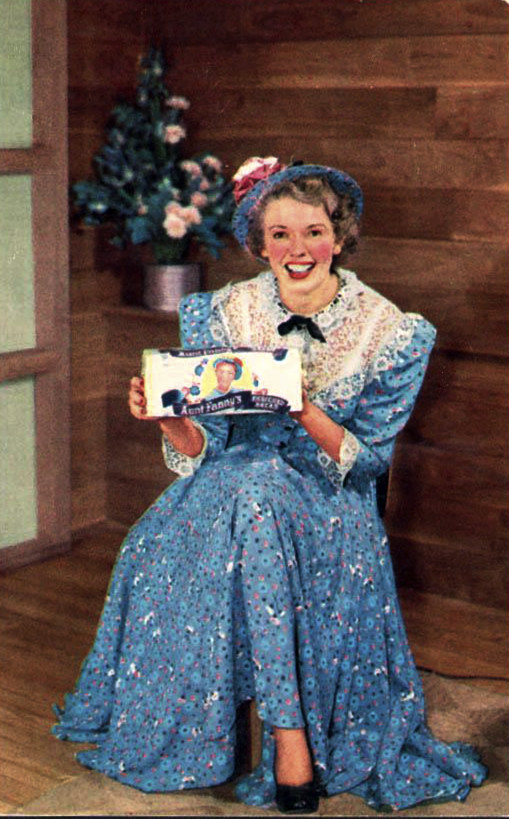
Allison as Aunt Fanny

She moved to Chicago, Illinois, in 1937, where she was hired as a staff singer and personality on NBC Radio. A July 26, 1937, newspaper item reported, "Fran Allison, singer of WMT, Waterloo, Ia., makes her network debut in the WJZ-NBC club matinee at 3."

Beginning in 1937, she was a regular performer on The Breakfast Club, a popular Chicago originating national radio show, and was a fixture for 25 years as "Aunt Fanny", a gossipy small-town spinster. Her Aunt Fanny character also appeared on the ABC-TV series, Ozark Jubilee, during the late 1950s. While in Chicago, she was also heard on Those Websters.

=== Kukla, Fran and Ollie ===
In 1947, the director of WBKB-TV in Chicago asked Burr Tillstrom if he could put together a puppet show for children, and he asked Allison, whom he had met during a World War II war bond tour, to join the show.

The show was an early American television show using puppets. It was created for children, but was soon watched by more adults than children. It did not have a script and was entirely ad-libbed. It was broadcast from Chicago between October 13, 1947, and August 30, 1957. Comedienne Fran Allison starred, interacting with hand puppets Kukla and Ollie (and sometimes other puppets) whose puppeteer was the show's creator, Burr Tillstrom.

=== Other television work ===
Her television career continued after the initial run of Kukla, Fran and Ollie: in the late 1950s, she hosted The Fran Allison Show, a panel discussion TV program in Chicago; and appeared in television musical specials displaying her singing abilities, including Many Moons (1954), Pinocchio with Mickey Rooney (1957), Damn Yankees (1967) with Phil Silvers and lastly Miss Pickerell (1972).

She had her own program, The Fran Allison Show on WGN-TV (1958–1960). In the 1980s, she hosted Prime Time, a show for senior citizens, on KHJ-TV in Los Angeles.

=== Recordings ===
Allison made records for the RCA Victor label. She had two minor pop hits. Her recording of "Peter Cottontail" charted at #26 around Easter of 1950. The next year her recording of "Too Young" achieved position #20. In both recordings she is backed by Jack Fascinato, who was the orchestra leader of Kukla, Fran and Ollie.

=== Recognition ===
In 1950, Allison was nominated for an Emmy Award as Most Outstanding Kinescoped Personality. In 1959, she won two Chicago Emmy awards. In 2002, she was a Silver Circle honoree of the Chicago/Midwest Chapter of the National Academy of Television Arts and Sciences.

In 1967, Iowa Wesleyan University awarded her an honorary doctorate of letters.

=== Personal life ===
Fran Allison was married to music publisher Archie Levington from 1940 until his death in 1978.

In her free time, she devoted her efforts to promoting mental health. From a profile in the Freeport Journal-Standard, "For mental health, she will travel anywhere, anytime."

Allison was on the board of Pacific Pioneer Broadcasters.

=== Death ===
In later life, Allison lived in Van Nuys, California. She died on June 13, 1989, aged 81. from myelodysplasia in Sherman Oaks, California, She was buried in Mount Calvary Cemetery in Cedar Rapids, Iowa. She was survived by her brother, James "Lynn" Allison, a saxophonist.

== Legacy ==
For contributions to the television industry, Allison was honored with a star on the Hollywood Walk of Fame at 6763 Hollywood Boulevard. She was inducted into the Chicago Television Academy's Silver Circle in 2002.

She appeared with puppets Kukla and Ollie on a 44¢ US commemorative postage stamp in the "Early TV Memories" series, issued on August 11, 2009.
