= Albert L. Weiser =

American sports coach and athletics administrator (1893–1980)

Biographical details
- Born: March 22, 1893; Grimes, Iowa, U.S.
- Died: October 21, 1980 (aged 87); Springfield, Missouri, U.S.

Coaching career (HC unless noted)

Football
- 1922–1926: Springfield Senior HS (MO)
- 1927–1932: Drury

Basketball
- 1922–1927: Springfield Senior HS (MO)
- 1927–1958: Drury

Track and field
- 1922–1927: Springfield Senior HS (MO)
- 1927–1963: Drury

Administrative career (AD unless noted)
- 1927–1963: Drury
- 1963–?: MCAU (commissioner)

Head coaching record
- Overall: 7–31–3 (college football); 316–256 (college basketball)

Albert Luther Weiser (March 22, 1893 – October 21, 1980) was an American sports coach and athletics administrator. Weiser coached football, basketball, track and field, golf, and tennis at Drury College—now known as Drury University—in Springfield, Missouri.

Weiser coached and served as director physical education at Springfield Senior High School in Springfield, Missouri for five years, from 1922 to 1927. There he coached football, basketball, and track. In 1927, Weiser was hired as the athletic director and head of the department of health education at Drury. Weiser coached the basketball team at Drury from 1927 to 1958, compiling a record of 316–256 in 31 seasons. He also coached Drury's football team until the school dropped the sport in 1933. He retired as Drury's athletic director in 1963, and was appointed the first commissioner of the Missouri College Athletic Union (MCAU). In 1971, Drury's Weiser Gymnasium, which had been built in 1946–47 was renamed in his honor.

Weiser died on October 21, 1980, at Cox Medical Center in Springfield.

== Head coaching record ==
=== College football ===
Year	Team	Overall	Conference	Standing	Bowl/playoffs
Drury Panthers (Missouri College Athletic Union) (1927–1932)
1927	Drury	0–5	0–4	T–9th	
1928	Drury	1–4–1	1–3–1	T–6th	
1929	Drury	3–5	1–3	7th	
1930	Drury	1–7	1–4	6th	
1931	Drury	1–5–2	0–4–2	T–5th	
1932	Drury	1–5	1–3	T–5th	
Drury:		7–31–3	4–21–3		
Total:		7–31–3			
