= Henri Godfriaux =

American football and basketball coach

Biographical details
- Born: c. 1888
- Died: March 5, 1954 (aged 65); Liberty, Missouri, U.S.

Coaching career (HC unless noted)

Football
- 1915–1917: Plattsburg HS (MO)
- 1919–1920: Plattsburg HS (MO)
- 1921–1924: Marshall HS (MO)
- 1925–1936: Missouri Valley
- 1937–1946: William Jewell

Basketball
- 1941–1946: William Jewell

Head coaching record
- Overall: 87–62–12 (college football); 18–57 (college basketball)

Accomplishments and honors

Championships
- Football; 8 MCAU (1927, 1929, 1932–1933, 1935–1938)

Henri Godfriaux (c. 1888 – March 5, 1954) was an American football and basketball coach. He served as the head football coach at Missouri Valley College in Marshall, Missouri, from 1925 to 1936, and William Jewell College in Liberty, Missouri, from 1937 to 1946, compiling a career college football coaching record of 87–62–12. Godfriaux was also the head basketball coach at William Jewell from 1941 to 1946, tallying a mark of 18–57.

Godfriaux died at the age of 65, on March 5, 1954, at his home in Liberty, after suffering a self-inflicted gunshot wound. He had been diagnosed with cancer.

== Head coaching record ==
=== College football ===
Year	Team	Overall	Conference	Standing	Bowl/playoffs
Missouri Valley Vikings (Missouri College Athletic Union) (1925–1936)
1925	Missouri Valley	3–3–1	2–3–1	6th	
1926	Missouri Valley	5–2	4–2	4th	
1927	Missouri Valley	7–0	6–0	1st	
1928	Missouri Valley	6–1–1	4–1–1	2nd	
1929	Missouri Valley	7–0–1	4–0	1st	
1930	Missouri Valley	4–4–1	2–3	T–4th	
1931	Missouri Valley	5–3–1	2–1–1	3rd	
1932	Missouri Valley	6–1–1	4–0	1st	
1933	Missouri Valley	4–2–1	2–0–1	1st	
1934	Missouri Valley	1–7–1	1–3	T–4th	
1935	Missouri Valley	6–3	3–1	1st	
1936	Missouri Valley	5–3	3–1	T–1st	
Missouri Valley:		59–29–8	37–15–4		
William Jewell Cardinals (Missouri College Athletic Union) (1937–1946)
1937	William Jewell	3–3–1	3–0–1	T–1st	
1938	William Jewell	5–2	4–0	1st	
1939	William Jewell	3–5	2–2	3rd	
1940	William Jewell	1–7–1	1–2–1	4th	
1941	William Jewell	4–4	3–1	2nd	
1942	William Jewell	4–3–1	2–1	2nd	
1943	No team—World War II				
1944	William Jewell	4–4–1			
1945	No team—World War II				
1946	William Jewell	4–5	2–2	3rd	
William Jewell:		28–33–4	17–8–2		
Total:		87–62–12			
National championship Conference title Conference division title or championship game berth
