= 1947 West Chester Golden Rams football team =

American college football season

1947 West Chester Golden Rams football

Burley Bowl champion

Burley Bowl, W 20–6 vs. Carson–Newman Cigar Bowl L 7–26 vs. Missouri Valley
- Conference: Pennsylvania State Teachers College Conference
- Record: 10–1 (3–0 PSTCC)
- Head coach: Glenn Killinger (11th season)
- Home stadium: Wayne Field

1947 Pennsylvania State Teachers College Conference football standings
	Conf.					Overall
Team	W		L		T	W		L		T
West Chester	3	–	0	–	0	10	–	1	–	0
Slippery Rock	3	–	0	–	0	4	–	2	–	1
Mansfield $	4	–	1	–	1	5	–	2	–	1
Bloomsburg	5	–	2	–	0	6	–	2	–	0
Shippensburg	5	–	2	–	1	5	–	2	–	1
Lock Haven	4	–	2	–	1	7	–	2	–	1
Indiana (PA)	2	–	2	–	2	3	–	3	–	2
California (PA)	1	–	2	–	0	6	–	1	–	0
Edinboro	1	–	2	–	0	1	–	6	–	0
Kutztown	1	–	4	–	0	2	–	6	–	0
Millersville	0	–	5	–	1	2	–	5	–	1
East Stroudsburg	0	–	3	–	0	3	–	3	–	0
Clarion	0	–	4	–	0	2	–	5	–	0
$ – Conference champion; West Chester and Slippery Rock were ineligible for the conference title as they did not play the required four conference games.

The 1947 West Chester Golden Rams football team represented West Chester State Teachers College—now known as West Chester University—as a member of the Pennsylvania State Teachers College Conference (PSTCC) during the 1947 college football season. Led by 11th-year head coach Glenn Killinger, the Golden Rams compiled an overall record of 10–1 with a mark of 3–0 in conference play. West Chester finished the season tied with Slippery Rock for the best record in the conference, but neither team was eligible for the conference title as neither had played the required four conference games. Mansfield won the conference title. Golden Rams played in two postseason bowl games, the Burley Bowl on Thanksgiving—where West Chester beat Carson–Newman—and the Cigar Bowl on New Year's Day, where the team suffered its first and only defeat of the season, against Missouri Valley.

== Schedule ==
Date	Time	Opponent	Site	Result	Attendance	Source
September 19		Moravian*	Wayne Field; West Chester, PA	W 20–6	5,000	
September 26	8:00 p.m.	Drexel*	Wayne Field; West Chester, PA	W 33–13	5,000	
October 3		Pennsylvania Military*	Wayne Field; West Chester, PA	W 33–0	5,000	
October 10		at Albright*	Reading, PA	W 20–7	4,500	
October 18		at Lock Haven	Lock Haven High School Athletic Field; Lock Haven, PA	W 14–6	4,500–5,000	
October 25		at East Stroudsburg	East Stroudsburg, PA	W 6–0		
October 31		Rider*	West Chester, PA	W 35–0	2,500	
November 7		CCNY*	Wayne Field; West Chester, PA	W 35–0	5,000	
November 15	2:00 p.m.	at Millersville	College Field; Millersville, PA	W 6–0		
November 27	2:15 p.m.	vs. Carson–Newman*	Memorial Stadium; Johnson City, TN (Burley Bowl)	W 20–6	10,000	
January 1	2:00 p.m.	vs. Missouri Valley*	Phillips Field; Tampa, FL (Cigar Bowl)	L 7–26	10,000	
*Non-conference game; All times are in Eastern time
