= 1949 Evansville Purple Aces football team =

American college football season

1949 Evansville Purple Aces football

OVC champion Reitz Bowl champion

Refrigerator Bowl, W 22–7 vs. Hillsdale
- Conference: Ohio Valley Conference
- Record: 8–2–1 (3–1–1 OVC)
- Head coach: Don Ping (4th season)
- Offensive scheme: T formation, short punt, Notre Dame Box
- Home stadium: Reitz Bowl, Bosse Field

1949 Ohio Valley Conference football standings
	Conf.					Overall
Team	W		L		T	W		L		T
Marshall	4	–	0	–	0	6	–	4	–	0
Louisville	3	–	0	–	0	8	–	3	–	0
Evansville $	3	–	1	–	1	8	–	2	–	1
Morehead State	3	–	3	–	0	6	–	3	–	0
Eastern Kentucky	2	–	2	–	1	4	–	4	–	1
Western Kentucky	2	–	3	–	0	5	–	4	–	0
Murray State	1	–	6	–	0	1	–	7	–	1
Tennessee Tech	0	–	3	–	0	3	–	6	–	0
$ – Conference champion; Evansville declared champion because Marshall and Louisville did not play required games in 1949

The 1949 Evansville Purple Aces football team represented Evansville College—now known as the University of Evansville—as a member of the Ohio Valley Conference (OVC) during the 1949 college football season. Led by fourth-year head coach Don Ping, the Purple Aces compiled an overall record of 8–2–1 with a mark of 3–1–1 in OVC play. Evansville has the third-best record of any|team in the conference, but because both team with better records, Marshall and Louisville, has not played the required number of conference games in order to be eligible for the title, the OVC championship was awards to the Purple Aces. Evansville was invited to the Refrigerator Bowl, where the Purple Aces defeated Hillsdale. On offense, Evansville employed three differnent formations: the T formation, the short punt formation, and Notre Dame Box. The team played home game at the Reitz Bowl and Bosse Field in Evansville, Indiana.

== Schedule ==
Date	Time	Opponent	Site	TV	Result	Attendance	Source
September 17	8:00 p.m.	Morehead State	Reitz Bowl; Evansville, IN		W 14–0	4,000	
September 24	2:00 p.m.	at Butler*	Butler Bowl; Indianapolis, IN	WFBM-TV	W 24–7	10,000	
October 1		at Western Kentucky	Bowling Green, KY		W 20–0		
October 7	8:00 p.m.	at Missouri Valley*	Gregg-Mitchell Field; Marshall, MO		W 17–7	5,000	
October 15	8:00 p.m.	St. Norbert*	Bosse Field; Evansville, IN		W 47–6	7,500	
October 20	8:00 p.m.	Murray State	Reitz Bowl; Evansville, IN		W 13–7	10,000	
October 28		at Chattanooga*	Chamberlain Field; Chattanooga, TN		L 17–21	5,500	
November 5	2:00 p.m.	Eastern Kentucky	Bosse Field; Evansville, IN		T 7–7	5,000	
November 11	8:45 p.m.	Pittsburg State*	Bosse Field; Evansville, IN		W 38–7	5,400	
November 19	2:00 p.m.	at Louisville	duPont Manual Stadium; Louisville, KY		L 7–28	4,200	
December 3	2:30 p.m.	vs. Hillsdale*	Reitz Bowl; Evansville, IN (Refrigerator Bowl)		W 22–7	5,500	
*Non-conference game; All times are in Central time
