= Kukla, Fran and Ollie =

American television series

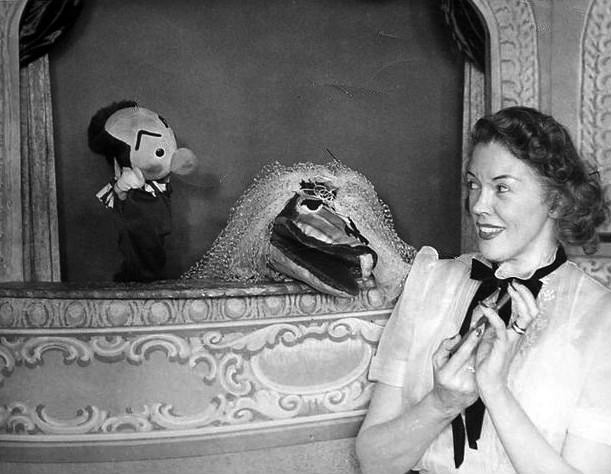
- Left to right: Kukla, Ollie and Fran
- Created by: Burr Tillstrom
- Directed by: Lewis Gomavitz
- Starring: Burr Tillstrom; Fran Allison
- Theme music composer: Jack Fascinato; Burr Tillstrom
- Opening theme: "Here We Are"
- Composer: Jack Fascinato
- Country of origin: United States
- Original language: English

Production
- Producer: Beulah Zachary
- Running time: 30 minutes (1947–51; 1952–54); 15 minutes (1951–52; 1954–57)

Original release
- Network: WBKB
- Release: October 13, 1947 – August 30, 1957

Kukla, Fran and Ollie is an early American television show using puppets. It was created for children, but was soon watched by more adults than children. It did not have a script and was entirely ad-libbed. It was broadcast from Chicago between October 13, 1947, and August 30, 1957. Comedienne Fran Allison starred, interacting with puppets, Kukla and Ollie (and sometimes other puppets) whose puppeteer was the show's creator, Burr Tillstrom. After the original run, the team appeared in other productions over several decades.

== Original series ==
Burr Tillstrom was the creator and only puppeteer on the show, which premiered as the hour-long Junior Jamboree locally on WBKB in Chicago, Illinois, on October 13, 1947. The program was renamed Kukla, Fran and Ollie (KFO) and transferred to WNBQ (the predecessor of Chicago's WMAQ-TV) on November 29, 1948. The first NBC network broadcast of the show took place on January 12, 1949. It aired from 6:00 to 6:30 p.m. Central Time, Monday through Friday from Chicago.

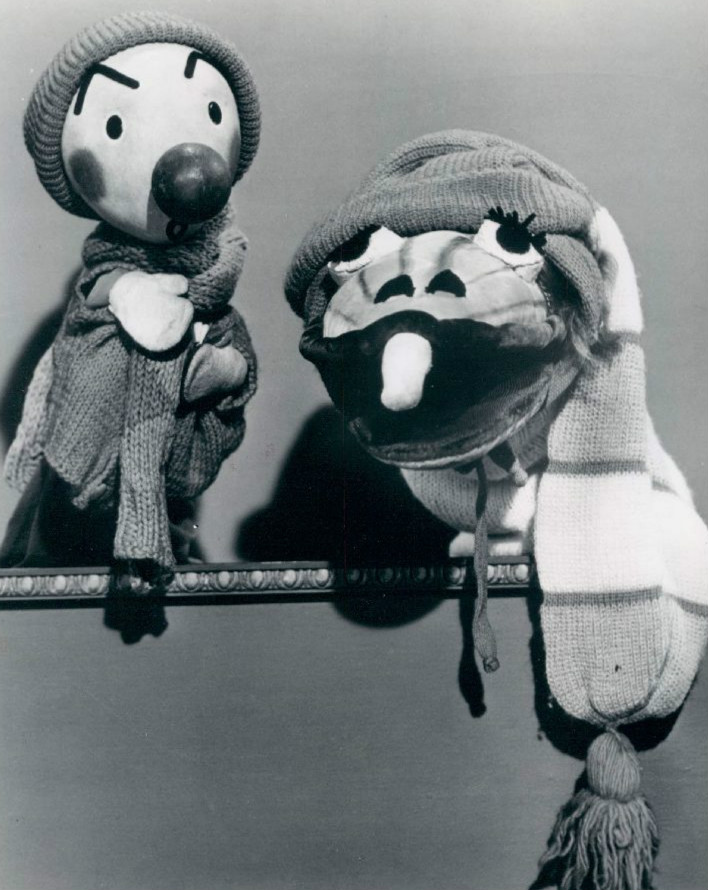
Kukla and Ollie

"Fran" was Fran Allison, a radio comedian and singer who was typically the only human to appear on screen, filling the role of big sister and cheery voice of reason as the puppets engaged each other concerning their foibles. The design style of puppets was that of Neapolitan puppet shows, or Punch and Judy without the slapstick, but their personalities were less caricatured.

The puppet cast included "Kukla", the earnest leader of the troupe; "Ollie", or "Oliver J. Dragon", a roguish one-toothed dragon (who would slam his flat chin on the stage in frustration or roll on his back to be endearing); Madame Ooglepuss, a retired opera diva; Buelah Witch, a brash, madcap witch; Fletcher Rabbit, the troupe's mailman and resident fussbudget (who worked at the Easter Bunny's Egg Plant during the Easter season); Cecil Bill, the troupe's union stagehand who spoke in an unintelligible "tooie talk"; Colonel Crackie, a Southern gentleman; Doloras Dragon, Ollie's younger cousin; Mercedes, a bratty grade schooler, Ollie's mother Olivia, and a number of others.

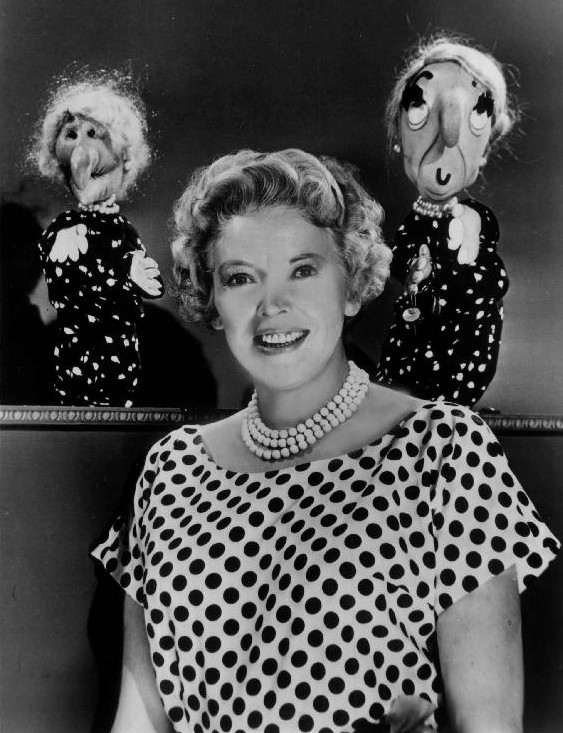
Buelah Witch, Fran, and Madame Oglepuss in 1961

The series' music was written and performed by Jack Fascinato, who first accompanied the troupe on solo piano and later conducted the show's small orchestra, from 1948 to 1954, when the show moved to ABC. Then, Carolyn Gilbert took that role, followed by Billy Goldenberg in 1961.

KFO's humor relied on building a relationship between its characters and the audience over time. The humor was quite tame by the standards of later comedy. There were few laugh-out-loud jokes per show; KFO relied on the humor of familiarity. KFO evoked not only loyalty but also a deep belief in its characters from regular viewers. Fans became so attached to the show that, when it was cut back to 15 minutes in November 1951, letters of outrage poured into NBC and The New York Times. The Bob & Ray Show was the replacement 15-minute program. The change received considerable vitriol by angry KFO viewers.

From August 1952 to June 1954, KFO ran as a weekly program on Sundays (3:00–3:30 p.m. CT). They also began a weekday radio show in October 1952. It was then picked up by the ABC network and returned to the 15-minute daily format (7:00–7:15 p.m. ET) until the last regular program aired on August 30, 1957, a continuous run of nearly ten years.

During that time, KFO was a hugely successful show that counted Orson Welles, John Steinbeck, Tallulah Bankhead, Ben Grauer, Milton Caniff and Adlai Stevenson among its many adult fans. The show had sponsors like Life magazine, RCA, Nabisco and Ford Motor Co., who surely weren't trying to reach children. James Thurber once wrote that Tillstrom was "helping to save the sanity of the nation and to improve, if not even to invent, the quality of television."

== Awards ==
Kukla, Fran, and Ollie won a Peabody Award in 1949 for its "whimsy and gentle satire of the James Barrie–Lewis Carroll sort," and two Emmy Awards: in 1954 for Best Children's Program, and in 1971 for Outstanding Children's Programming.

== The Ford 50th Anniversary Show ==
In 1953, Kukla and Ollie co-hosted The Ford 50th Anniversary Show, a program that was broadcast live on both NBC and CBS. The puppets introduced various sketches and artists, were featured in a sketch about the history of the Ford Model T, and presented a multi-part "Oliver J. Dragon" compilation of newsreel scenes. Following a song medley by Ethel Merman and Mary Martin, Kukla and Ollie complain about having to follow the two singers performing "There's No Business Like Show Business". Ollie says, "There's no business like television, either." Kukla replies, "Well, it's so young." Ollie says, "Yes. Whenever will it grow up? Maybe tonight. Maybe tonight." The program attracted an audience of 60 million viewers. Forty years after the broadcast, television critic Tom Shales recalled the broadcast as both "a landmark in television" and "a milestone in the cultural life of the '50s".

== Later series ==
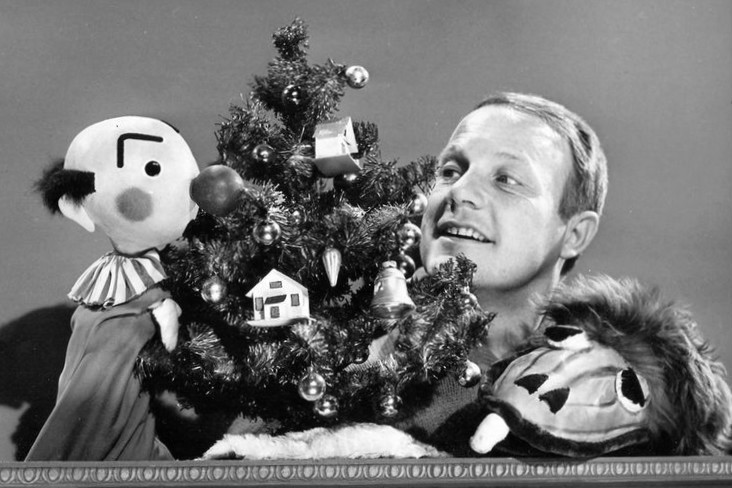
Kukla, Tillstrom and Ollie celebrate Christmas on Burr Tillstrom's Kukla and Ollie, 1961.

After the original series ended in 1957, Tillstrom continued to search for a place for the Kuklapolitans, doing a daily five-minute show for NBC, and even appearing on Broadway. Tillstrom and his puppets returned to NBC television without Allison in the early 1960s for Burr Tillstrom's Kukla and Ollie show that aired weekdays. In 1967, KFO began hosting CBS Children's Film Festival. In this context, their conversations were restricted to a brief introduction, commercial segues and a summary of the film, and could only provide a hint of what had made KFO so popular. Many people know the troupe only from this filmed show and their later taped series for NET in 1970. Burr also brought the troupe to the Goodman Theatre in Chicago for a series of live performances in the early 1980s.

KFO can claim a number of television firsts, including the first ship-to-shore telecast. The first publicly announced network broadcast of a program using the NTSC "compatible color" system was an episode of Kukla, Fran and Ollie on August 30, 1953. Burr was inducted into the Television Academy Hall of Fame in 1986 for his many contributions to the medium. Tillstrom influenced and mentored many later puppeteers, including Shari Lewis and Jim Henson.

Kukla and Ollie made an appearance on The Carpenters' 1977 television special for ABC, The Carpenters at Christmas, along with Harvey Korman and Kristy McNichol. Kukla and Ollie also appeared as panelists on a 1979 episode of Match Game PM and on five episodes of Match Game '79.

== Digital media and stamp ==
Kukla, Fran, and Ollie was first released on DVD on August 11, 2009. Five episodes that were shot in color between 1969 and 1971 were released in a box set.

On the same day, August 11, 2009, the United States Postal Service issued a commemorative stamp to honor Kukla, Fran and Ollie. A Hollywood gala was scheduled to celebrate both the stamp and the 60th anniversary at the Academy of Television Arts and Sciences.

Kukla, Fran and Ollie – The First Episodes: 1949–54 was released on Fran's birthday, November 20, 2010, by The Burr Tillstrom Copyright Trust. It was the first release of the original series, and contains 20 kinescopes. A second volume, featuring 22 additional programs, was released on December 15, 2011. Volume 3 of the series, a 24 episode set, was eventually released in December 2013. DVD sales officially ended on January 31, 2020.

On February 24, 2020, the Kukla, Fran and Ollie YouTube channel started posting digital transfers of KFO kinescopes on a regular schedule, beginning with the earliest surviving episode. The stated goal is to eventually make all of the surviving episodes from the original series available and free to view online.
