= 1949 McMurry Indians football team =

American college football season

1949 McMurry Indians football

Texas Conference champion Oleander Bowl champion

Oleander Bowl, W 19–13 vs. Missouri Valley
- Conference: Texas Conference
- Record: 8–2–1 (4–0–1 Texas)
- Head coach: Wilford Moore (3rd season)
- Home stadium: Fair Park Stadium

1949 Texas Conference football standings
	Conf.					Overall
Team	W		L		T	W		L		T
McMurry $	4	–	0	–	1	8	–	2	–	1
Texas A&I	3	–	2	–	0	8	–	2	–	0
Howard Payne	3	–	2	–	0	6	–	5	–	0
Austin	3	–	2	–	0	5	–	5	–	0
Abilene Christian	1	–	4	–	0	3	–	6	–	0
Southwestern (TX)	0	–	4	–	1	3	–	7	–	2
$ – Conference champion

The 1949 McMurry Indians football team represented McMurry College—now known as McMurry University—as a member of the Texas Conference during the 1949 college football season. Led by third-year head coach Wilford Moore, the Indians compiled an overall record of 8–2–1 with a mark of 4–0–1 in conference play, winning the Texas Conference title. McMurry was invited to the Oleander Bowl, where the Indians defeated Missouri Valley. The team played home games at Fair Park Stadium in Abilene, Texas.

== Schedule ==
Date	Time	Opponent	Site	Result	Attendance	Source
September 17	8:00 p.m.	at Tulsa*	Skelly Field; Tulsa, OK	L 26–27	10,000	
September 24		at West Texas State*	Buffalo Stadium; Canyon, TX	W 34–7		
October 1	8:00 p.m.	at Corpus Christi*	Buccaneer Stadium; Corpus Christi, TX	W 58–12		
October 8		at Mississippi Southern*	Faulkner Field; Hattiesburg, MS	L 32–55	10,000	
October 15	8:00 p.m.	Texas A&I	Fair Park Stadium; Abilene, TX	W 39–14		
October 22	8:00 p.m.	Abilene Christian	Fair Park Stadium; Abilene, TX	W 21–0	10,000	
October 29	8:30 p.m.	at Austin	Bearcat Stadium; Sherman, TX	W 34–19		
November 5		vs. Sul Ross	Monahans High School Stadium; Monahans, TX (rivalry)	W 46–20	7,000	
November 11	8:00 p.m.	Howard Payne^{†}	Fair Park Stadium; Abilene, TX	W 27–6		
November 19		at Southwestern (TX)	Snyder Stadium; Georgetown, TX	T 20–20		
January 2	2:00 p.m.	vs. Missouri Valley*	Public School Stadium; Galveston, TX (Oleander Bowl)	W 19–13	7,500	
*Non-conference game; ^{†}Homecoming; All times are in Central time
