= 1949 Western Kentucky Hilltoppers football team =

American college football season

1949 Western Kentucky Hilltoppers football
- Conference: Ohio Valley Conference
- Record: 5–4 (2–3 OVC)
- Head coach: Jack Clayton (2nd season)

1949 Ohio Valley Conference football standings
	Conf.					Overall
Team	W		L		T	W		L		T
Marshall	4	–	0	–	0	6	–	4	–	0
Louisville	3	–	0	–	0	8	–	3	–	0
Evansville $	3	–	1	–	1	8	–	2	–	1
Morehead State	3	–	3	–	0	6	–	3	–	0
Eastern Kentucky	2	–	2	–	1	4	–	4	–	1
Western Kentucky	2	–	3	–	0	5	–	4	–	0
Murray State	1	–	6	–	0	1	–	7	–	1
Tennessee Tech	0	–	3	–	0	3	–	6	–	0
$ – Conference champion; Evansville declared champion because Marshall and Louisville did not play required games in 1949

The 1949 Western Kentucky Hilltoppers football team represented Western Kentucky State College (now known as Western Kentucky University) as a member of the Ohio Valley Conference (OVC) during the 1949 college football season. Led by second-year head coach Jack Clayton, the Hilltoppers compiled an overall record of 5–4 with a mark of 2–3 in conference play, placing sixth in the OVC.

== Schedule ==
Date	Opponent	Site	Result	Attendance	Source
September 24	Louisville	Bowling Green, KY	L 7–47		
October 1	Evansville	Bowling Green, KY	L 0–20		
October 8	Morehead State	Bowling Green, KY	W 19–0		
October 15	at Union (TN)*	Jackson, TN	W 20–7		
October 22	Howard (AL)*	Bowling Green, KY	W 20–0	2,500	
October 29	at Georgetown (KY)*	Georgetown, KY	W 13–7		
November 5	Delta State*^{†}	Bowling Green, KY	L 7–13		
November 12	at Eastern Kentucky	Richmond, KY (rivalry)	L 7–20		
November 19	at Murray State	Cutchin Stadium; Murray, KY (rivalry)	W 10–7		
*Non-conference game; ^{†}Homecoming
