= Robert C. Hicks =

American football player and coach (1927–2018)

Biographical details
- Born: April 4, 1927; Lancaster, Pennsylvania, U.S.
- Died: April 7, 2018 (aged 91); Newport Beach, California, U.S.

Playing career
- 1944: Penn State
- 1947–1949: Penn State

Coaching career (HC unless noted)
- 1953: Albright (assistant)
- 1954–1955: Juniata
- 1956–1958: DePauw
- 1959–1961: Detroit (assistant)
- 1962–1977: Wagner

Head coaching record
- Overall: 102–79–8
- Bowls: 0–0–1

Accomplishments and honors

Championships
- 2 MAC College–Northern Division (1964, 1967)

Robert Charles Hicks (April 4, 1927 – April 7, 2018) was an American college football player and coach. He served as the head football coach at Juniata College in Huntingdon, Pennsylvania from 1954 to 1955, DePauw University in Greencastle, Indiana from 1956 to 1958, and Wagner College in Staten Island from 1962 to 1977, compiling a career head coaching record of 102–79–8.

At Juniata, he led the Eagles to an undefeated record in each of his two seasons at the helm and an appearance in the 1956 Tangerine Bowl. Hicks played college football at Pennsylvania State University.

== Head coaching record ==
Year	Team	Overall	Conference	Standing	Bowl/playoffs	UPI^{#}
Juniata Indians (Independent) (1954–1955)
1954	Juniata	8–0				
1955	Juniata	8–0–1			T Tangerine	
Juniata:		16–0–1				
DePauw Tigers (Indiana Collegiate Conference) (1956–1958)
1956	DePauw	1–6–1	1–5	6th		
1957	DePauw	6–2	3–2	3rd		
1958	DePauw	2–7	1–5	T–6th		
DePauw:		9–15–1	5–12			
Wagner Seahawks (Middle Atlantic Conference) (1962–1971)
1962	Wagner	4–4–1	3–4	3rd (Northern College)		
1963	Wagner	6–3	4–1	2nd (Northern College)		
1964	Wagner	10–0	5–0	1st (Northern College)		
1965	Wagner	3–6	2–3	7th (Northern College)		
1966	Wagner	2–6–1	1–3–1	8th (Northern College)		
1967	Wagner	9–0	5–0	T–1st (Northern College)		14
1968	Wagner	3–6	3–1	NA (Northern College)		
1969	Wagner	4–5	3–1	NA (Northern College)		
1970	Wagner	5–3–1	3–1	NA (Northern)		
1971	Wagner	5–4	3–1	NA (Northern)		
Wagner Seahawks (Metropolitan Intercollegiate Conference) (1972–1977)
1972	Wagner	7–3	2–1	2nd		
1973	Wagner	4–5	0–3	7th		
1974	Wagner	5–3–1	2–2	4th		
1975	Wagner	6–2–1	3–2	3rd		
1976	Wagner	2–7–1	1–4	6th		
1977	Wagner	2–7	1–4	5th		
Wagner:		77–64–6	41–31–1			
Total:		102–79–8				
National championship Conference title Conference division title or championship game berth
