= 1949 Hillsdale Dales football team =

American college football season

1949 Hillsdale Dales football

MIAA champion

Refrigerator Bowl, L 7–22 vs. Evansville
- Conference: Michigan Intercollegiate Athletic Association
- Record: 9–1 (5–0 MIAA)
- Head coach: Jack Petoskey (1st season)

1949 Michigan Intercollegiate Athletic Association football standings
	Conf.					Overall
Team	W		L		T	W		L		T
Hillsdale $	5	–	0	–	0	9	–	1	–	0
Hope	4	–	1	–	0	7	–	1	–	0
Alma	2	–	2	–	1	5	–	2	–	1
Adrian	2	–	2	–	1	4	–	3	–	1
Kalamazoo	1	–	4	–	0	2	–	6	–	0
Albion	0	–	5	–	0	2	–	6	–	1
$ – Conference champion

The 1949 Hillsdale Dales football team, also known as the Bearcats, represented Hillsdale College as a member of the Michigan Intercollegiate Athletic Association (MIAA) during the 1949 college football season. Led by first-year head coach Jack Petoskey, the Dales compiled an overall record of 9–1 with a mark of 5–0 in conference play, winning the MIAA title. Hilldale was invited to the Refrigerator Bowl, where the Dales lost to Evansville.

== Schedule ==
Date	Time	Opponent	Site	Result	Attendance	Source
September 24		Wittenberg*	Hillsdale, MI	W 20–6	1,500	
October 1		at Grand Rapids JC*	Grand Rapids, MI	W 49–0		
October 8		at Kalamazoo	Kalamazoo, MI	W 28–0		
October 15		Alma	Hillsdale, MI	W 26–0		
October 22		at Hope	Holland, MI	W 13–9		
October 29		at Central Michigan*	Alumni Field; Mount Pleasant, MI	W 8–0	5,000	
November 5		Adrian	Hillsdale, MI	W 20–7		
November 12		Albion	Hillsdale, MI	W 21–7		
November 19	2:30 p.m.	at Indiana State*	Memorial Stadium; Terre Haute, IN	W 48–0		
December 3	2:30 p.m.	vs. Evansville*	Reitz Bowl; Evansville, IN (Refrigerator Bowl)	L 7–22	5,500	
*Non-conference game; All times are in Eastern time
