= 1956 Tangerine Bowl =

American college football game

Juniata Indians	Missouri Valley Vikings
(8–0)	(9–1)
Independent	Missouri College Athletic Union
6	6
Head coach: Robert C. Hicks	Head coach: Volney Ashford
	1	2	3	4	Total
Juniata	6	0	0	0	6
Missouri Valley	6	0	0	0	6
- Date: January 2, 1956
- Season: 1955
- Stadium: Tangerine Bowl
- Location: Orlando, Florida
- MVP: Barry Drexler, Juniata
- Favorite: Missouri Valley by 7
- Attendance: 10,000

The 1956 Tangerine Bowl was an American college football bowl game played after the 1955 season, on January 2, 1956, at the Tangerine Bowl stadium in Orlando, Florida. The Juniata Indians with a record of 8–0 faced the Missouri Valley Vikings with a record of 9–1. Juniata had outscored their regular season opponents 240–32 with 4 shutouts, and had a 23-game winning streak, while Missouri Valley had outscored their opponents 207–84 with 2 shutouts. The teams played to a 6–6 tie.

The undefeated 1955 Hillsdale College football team refused an invitation to this bowl when organizers insisted that Hillsdale's four African-American players would not be allowed to play in the game.

== Game summary ==
All scoring took place in the first quarter, with each team scoring a touchdown via a passing play, and both teams missing their extra point attempts. Despite other scoring chances, including Juniata having two first-and-goal opportunities in the fourth quarter, the game ended in a 6–6 tie.

== Scoring summary ==
Scoring summary

Quarter	Time	Drive			Team	Scoring information	Score	
Quarter	Time	Plays	Yards	TOP	Team	Scoring information	JC	MVC
1	10:23	2	15		MVC	Ken Gibler 10-yard touchdown reception from Bobbie Joe Scates, Lavon Norvell kick short	0	6
1	5:14	11	67		JC	Barry Drexler 30-yard touchdown reception from Pat Tarquinio, Keith Birmingham kick wide	6	6
"TOP" = time of possession. For other American football terms, see Glossary of American football.							6	6

== Statistics ==
Statistics	Juniata	Missouri Valley
First downs	16	16
Rushing yards	95	152
Passes attempted	26	13
Passes completed	15	7
Passes intercepted by	1	1
Passing yards	216	119
Yards penalized	5	25
Punts–average	3–23.3	5–39.4
Fumbles lost	2	0

== Notes ==
- Juniata head coach Robert C. Hicks was unrelated to Bob Hicks who was the head coach at Indiana in 1957. Robert C. Hicks later coached at DePauw and Wagner.
- Missouri Valley head coach Volney Ashford is an inductee of the College Football Hall of Fame.
