= 1949 Louisville Cardinals football team =

American college football season

1949 Louisville Cardinals football
- Conference: Ohio Valley Conference
- Record: 8–3 (3–0 OVC)
- Head coach: Frank Camp (4th season)
- Home stadium: duPont Manual Stadium

1949 Ohio Valley Conference football standings
	Conf.					Overall
Team	W		L		T	W		L		T
Marshall	4	–	0	–	0	6	–	4	–	0
Louisville	3	–	0	–	0	8	–	3	–	0
Evansville $	3	–	1	–	1	8	–	2	–	1
Morehead State	3	–	3	–	0	6	–	3	–	0
Eastern Kentucky	2	–	2	–	1	4	–	4	–	1
Western Kentucky	2	–	3	–	0	5	–	4	–	0
Murray State	1	–	6	–	0	1	–	7	–	1
Tennessee Tech	0	–	3	–	0	3	–	6	–	0
$ – Conference champion; Evansville declared champion because Marshall and Louisville did not play required games in 1949

The 1949 Louisville Cardinals football team was an American football team that represented the University of Louisville as a member of the Ohio Valley Conference (OVC) during the 1949 college football season. In their fourth season under head coach Frank Camp, the Cardinals compiled an 8–3 record. The team was led on offense by Ross Lucia and played its home games at duPont Manual Stadium in Louisville, Kentucky.

== Schedule ==
Date	Time	Opponent	Site	Result	Attendance	Source
September 17		Saint Joseph's (IN)*	duPont Manual Stadium; Louisville, KY	W 33–7		
September 23		at Western Kentucky	Bowling Green, KY	W 47–7		
September 30		Murray State	duPont Manual Stadium; Louisville, KY	W 34–14		
October 8		Miami (FL)*	duPont Manual Stadium; Louisville, KY (rivalry)	L 0–26	12,000	
October 15		Akron*	duPont Manual Stadium; Louisville, KY	W 62–6		
October 21		Xavier*	duPont Manual Stadium; Louisville, KY	L 7–19		
October 29		at Bradley*	Peoria Stadium; Peoria, IL	W 35–12		
November 3		at Catawba*	Salisbury, NC	W 41–7		
November 12	2:00 p.m.	Washington University*	duPont Manual Stadium; Louisville, KY	W 35–12	9,000	
November 19	2:00 p.m.	Evansville	duPont Manual Stadium; Louisville, KY	W 28–7	4,200	
November 24		at Mississippi Southern*	Faulkner Field; Hattiesburg, MS	L 21–26	10,000	
*Non-conference game; All times are in Central time
