= 1949 Marshall Thundering Herd football team =

American college football season

1949 Marshall Thundering Herd football
- Conference: Ohio Valley Conference
- Record: 6–4 (4–0 OVC)
- Head coach: Cam Henderson (12th season)
- Captains: Marvin Wetzel; Danny Clark
- Home stadium: Fairfield Stadium

1949 Ohio Valley Conference football standings
| | Conf. | | | | | Overall |
| Team | W | | L | | T | W | | L | | T |
|---|---|---|---|---|---|---|---|---|---|---|
| Marshall | 4 | – | 0 | – | 0 | 6 | – | 4 | – | 0 |
| Louisville | 3 | – | 0 | – | 0 | 8 | – | 3 | – | 0 |
| Evansville $ | 3 | – | 1 | – | 1 | 8 | – | 2 | – | 1 |
| Morehead State | 3 | – | 3 | – | 0 | 6 | – | 3 | – | 0 |
| Eastern Kentucky | 2 | – | 2 | – | 1 | 4 | – | 4 | – | 1 |
| Western Kentucky | 2 | – | 3 | – | 0 | 5 | – | 4 | – | 0 |
| Murray State | 1 | – | 6 | – | 0 | 1 | – | 7 | – | 1 |
| Tennessee Tech | 0 | – | 3 | – | 0 | 3 | – | 6 | – | 0 |
$ – Conference champion; Evansville declared champion because Marshall and Louisville did not play required games in 1949

The 1949 Marshall Thundering Herd football team was an American football team that represented Marshall University in the Ohio Valley Conference (OVC) during the 1949 college football season. In its 12th season under head coach Cam Henderson, the team compiled a 6–4 record (4–0 against conference opponents) and outscored opponents by a total of 168 to 147. Marvin Wetzel and Danny Clark were the team captains.

== Schedule ==
| Date | Opponent | Site | Result | Attendance | Source |
|---|---|---|---|---|---|
| September 24 | Morehead State | Fairfield Stadium; Huntington, WV | W 20–15 | | |
| October 1 | at Eastern Kentucky | Hanger Field; Richmond, KY | W 24–7 | | |
| October 8 | Dayton* | Fairfield Stadium; Huntington, WV | L 23–40 | > 10,000 | |
| October 15 | Murray State | Fairfield Stadium; Huntington, WV | W 13–6 | | |
| October 21 | at John Carroll* | Cleveland, OH | L 7–26 | | |
| October 29 | Ohio*^{†} | Fairfield Stadium; Huntington, WV | W 14–6 | | |
| November 5 | at Tennessee Tech | Overhill Field; Cookeville, TN | W 20–7 | | |
| November 11 | Milligan* | Fairfield Stadium; Huntington, WV | W 34–0 | | |
| November 19 | at Vanderbilt* | Dudley Field; Nashville, TN | L 6–27 | | |
| November 24 | Xavier* | Fairfield Stadium; Huntington, WV | L 7–13 | 8,000 | |
*Non-conference game; ^{†}Homecoming
