= Burr Tillstrom =

Puppeteer

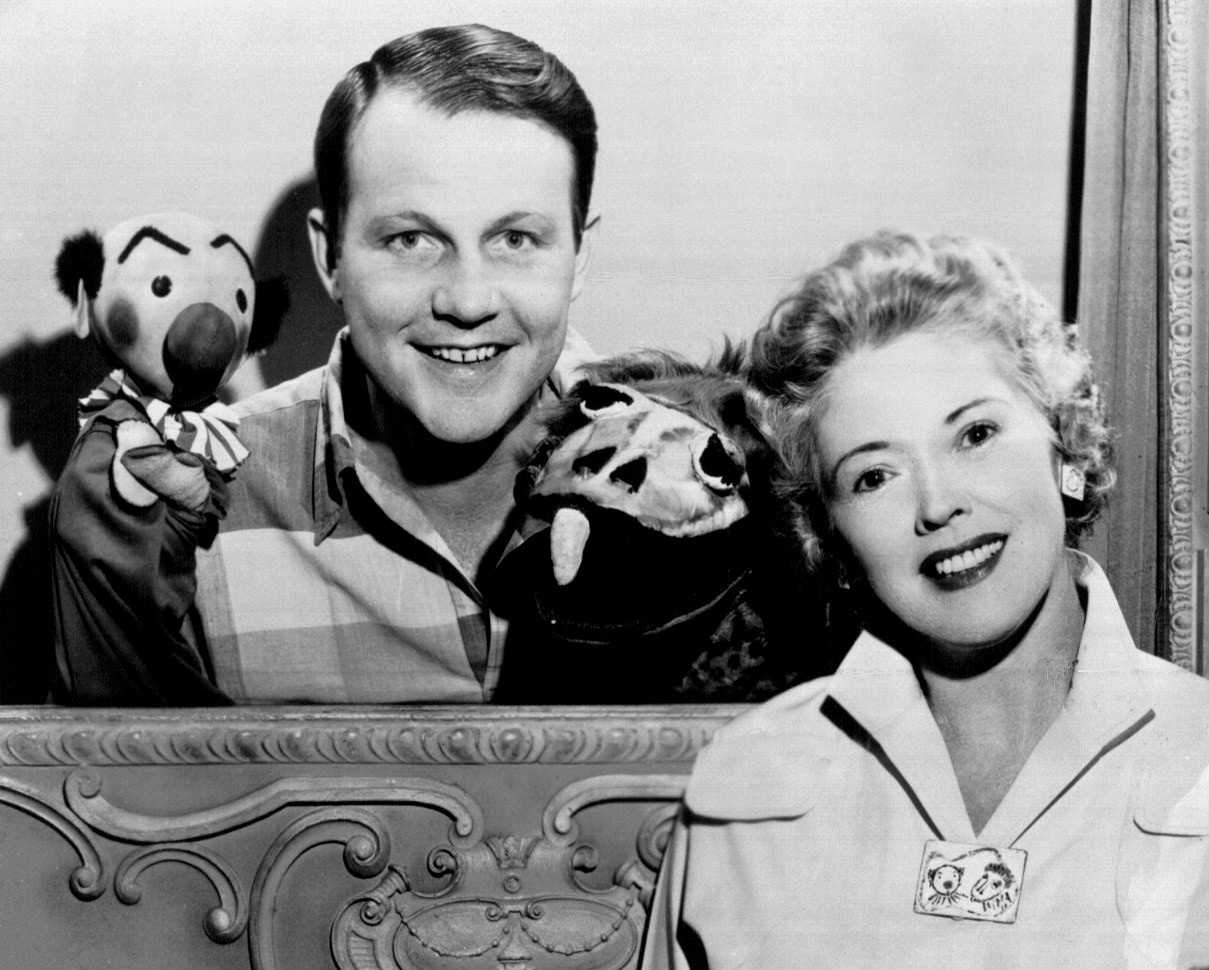
- Tillstrom with Kukla, Ollie and Fran Allison, 1954
- Born: Franklin Burr Tillstrom; October 13, 1917; Chicago, Illinois, U.S.
- Died: December 6, 1985 (aged 68); Palm Springs, California, U.S.
- Occupation: Puppeteer

Franklin Burr Tillstrom (October 13, 1917 – December 6, 1985) was a puppeteer and the creator of Kukla, Fran and Ollie.

== Early life ==
Tillstrom was born in Chicago, Illinois, to Bert and Alice Burr Tillstrom. He attended Senn High School in Chicago and later the University of Chicago. While still a freshman, he accepted a job offer from the WPA-Chicago Parks District Theatre to set up a marionette theater.

== Career ==
Tillstrom turned his attention to puppetry in the early 1930s and created Kukla in 1936. Kukla remained nameless until the Russian ballerina Tamara Toumanova referred to him as kukla, the Russian word for "doll". Other famous puppets from Tillstrom's group included Ollie (Oliver J. Dragon), Beulah Witch, Goultar, Cecil Bill, and Fletcher Rabbit. In 1939, Tillstrom was invited to present his Kuklapolitan Players at the New York World's Fair. The following year, RCA sent him to Bermuda to perform on the first ship-to-shore broadcast.

From 1947 to 1957, Tillstrom was involved with the Kukla, Fran and Ollie show, which starred his puppets and Fran Allison. It is widely regarded as being the first children's show to appeal to both children and adults, and counted Orson Welles, John Steinbeck, Tallulah Bankhead, Adlai Stevenson, and James Thurber among its many adult fans. With only a few exceptions, all of the shows were improvised.

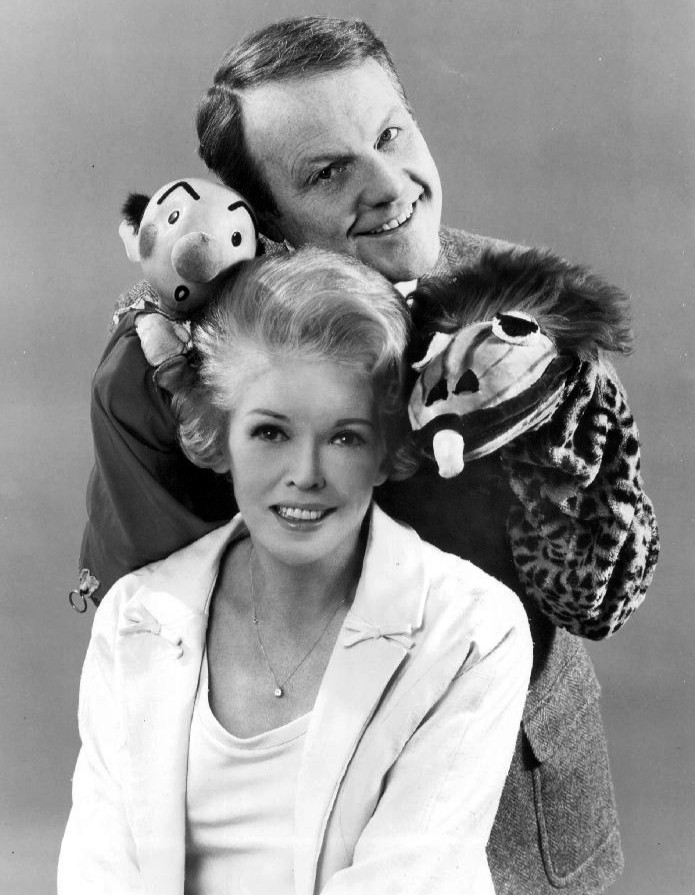
Tillstrom and Fran Allison with Kukla and Ollie, 1968

After the original series ended in 1957, Tillstrom continued to work with the Kuklapolitans. Early in 1958, Tillstrom appeared with the puppets on Polly Bergen's short-lived NBC variety show, The Polly Bergen Show.

Tillstrom, Kukla and Ollie reunited with Fran Allison to host the CBS Children's Film Festival from 1967 to 1977. In 1970, Kukla, Fran and Ollie appeared on National Educational Television, taped at WTTW in Chicago, for two seasons. In 1975, Kukla, Fran and Ollie began another run on television with 13 new episodes.

In 1977, The Kukla and Ollie Retrospective Stage Show tours began, a creation of the Artist-in-Residence program at Hope College. In 1978, Kukla, Burr and Ollie joined the Broadway cast of Side by Side by Sondheim, a revue of Stephen Sondheim songs.

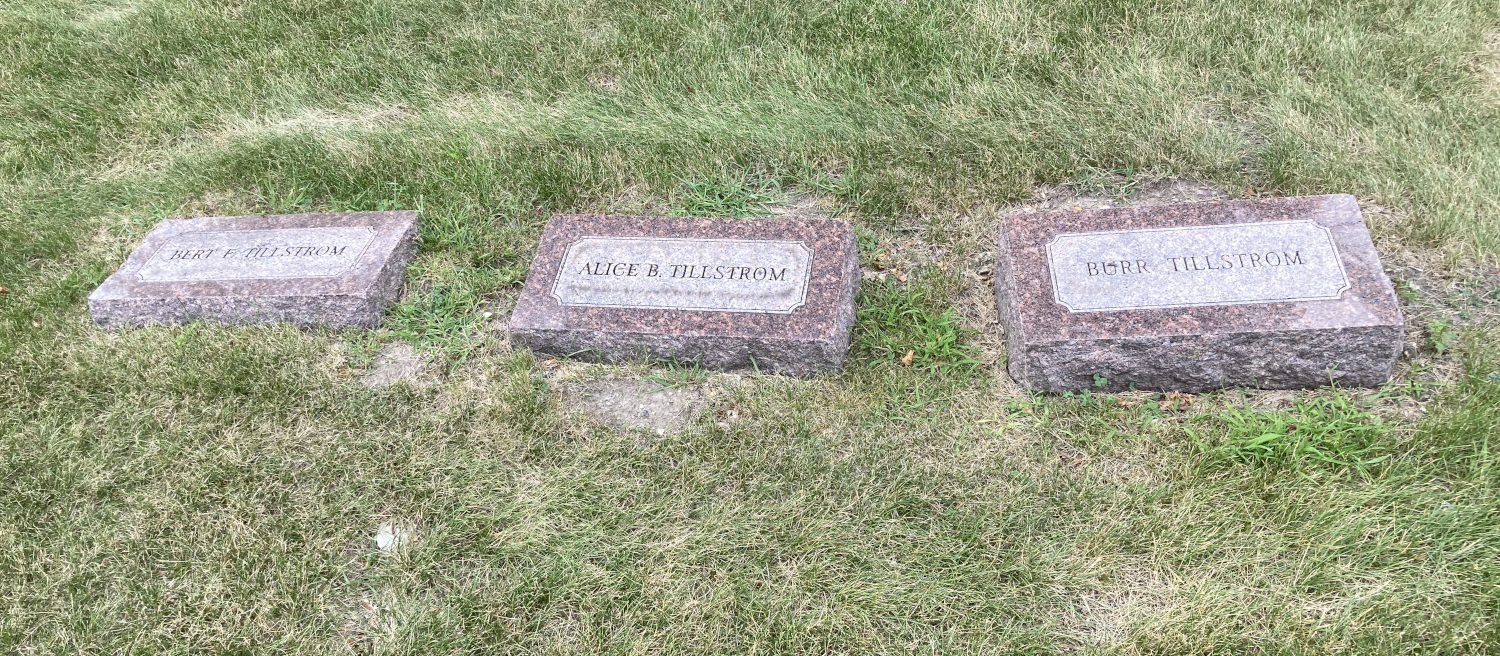
Tillstrom's grave at Rosehill Cemetery

Tillstrom continued to perform with his Kuklapolitan Players until his death at age 68 in Palm Springs, California, on December 6, 1985. He was found sitting in a chair near his swimming pool and appeared to have died from natural causes. He was buried at Rosehill Cemetery in Chicago. His papers are held at the Chicago History Museum.

== Honors ==
On March 23, 1986, Burr Tillstrom was inducted into the Television Academy Hall of Fame for his creativity and innovation in the medium. The Saugatuck Douglas Art Club in Saugatuck, Michigan (the location of Tillstrom's longtime summer home), dedicated a memorial to Tillstrom in 1988. The Burr Tillstrom Collection and Archives are maintained at the Chicago History Museum.

In 2013 Tillstrom was inducted into the Chicago Gay and Lesbian Hall of Fame.

In 1999, the city of Chicago honored Tillstrom with a historical marker at 1407 W. Sherwin in the Rogers Park neighborhood, where he was living when he debuted "Kukla, Fran and Ollie."
