= Cigar Bowl =

Cigar Bowl (defunct)
- Stadium: Phillips Field
- Location: Tampa, Florida
- Operated: 1947–1954

Sponsors
- Egypt Temple Shrine

The Cigar Bowl was a post-season college football bowl game held in Tampa, Florida that featured teams from smaller college programs. There were nine editions of the bowl, which was usually played on or around New Year's Day each season from 1946 through 1954. It was played at Phillips Field, which was located across the Hillsborough River from downtown Tampa at the current site of Tampa Preparatory School and Julian Lane Riverfront Park. Its name was inspired by the local cigar industry, which had been the main driver of Tampa's growth from an isolated village to a prosperous city around the turn of the 20th century.

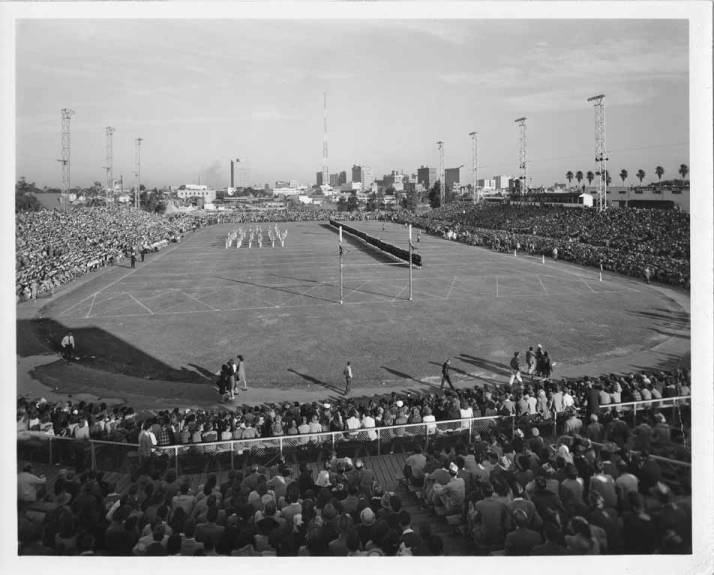
Pregame at Phillips Field, 1947

The Cigar Bowl marked the first bowl appearances for the Florida State Seminoles (following the 1949 season) and the Tampa Spartans (following the 1952 season). When scheduled on New Year's Day, the game was usually played in the evening so that fans could follow radio coverage of the marquee bowl games held earlier in the day. In some years, the Cigar Bowl was part of a month-long "sports circus" in Tampa, with college basketball, golf, and tennis tournaments scheduled around the area along with horse racing and boxing.

From its inception, the Cigar Bowl was sponsored by the local chapter of the Egypt Temple Shrine as a fundraising event. However, the primitive amenities and limited capacity of Phillips Field (20,000 with temporary bleachers) along with rising costs made it increasingly ineffective as a money maker for the organization. After the December 1954 game drew a "disappointing" attendance of 6,500 despite featuring the hometown Tampa Spartans, the Shriners decided to end their involvement. No other organization stepped in to take over, and the Cigar Bowl was discontinued.

There were several attempts to revive the Cigar Bowl as a major bowl in subsequent years, but the difficulty of drawing top college teams without a large modern venue made the prospect financially impossible. Tampa Stadium was constructed in 1967 to serve as a new home field for the Tampa Spartans and, eventually, the expansion Tampa Bay Buccaneers of the National Football League. The area next hosted a college bowl game in 1986, when the Hall of Fame Bowl (later known as the Outback Bowl and currently the ReliaQuest Bowl) relocated to Tampa from Birmingham, Alabama.

== Game results ==
Date	Winner		Loser		Reference
January 1, 1947	Delaware	21	Rollins	7	
January 1, 1948	Missouri Valley	26	West Chester	7	
January 1, 1949	Missouri Valley	13	St. Thomas (MN)	13	
January 2, 1950	Florida State	19	Wofford	6	
January 1, 1951	La Crosse State	47	Valparaiso	14	
December 29, 1951	Brooke Army Medical Center	20	Camp Lejeune	0	
December 13, 1952	Tampa	21	Lenoir–Rhyne	12	
January 1, 1954	Missouri Valley	12	La Crosse State	12	
December 17, 1954	Tampa	21	Morris Harvey	0	

== See also ==
- List of college bowl games
