= Refrigerator Bowl =

Refrigerator Bowl (defunct)
- Program cover from the bowl's inaugural edition
- Stadium: Reitz Bowl; 37.9739°N 87.6049°W
- Location: Evansville, Indiana, U.S.
- Operated: 1948–1956

The Refrigerator Bowl was an American college football bowl game played annually from 1948 until 1956 in Evansville, Indiana. The game was held at the Reitz Bowl, located at F. J. Reitz High School on the west side of Evansville. The stadium opened in 1919, has been renovated several times, and remains in use today as a venue for high school football.

== History ==
The Refrigerator Bowl was founded as part of a post-1945 bowl game boom featuring a number of short-lived games (Note: See, for example, the Cigar Bowl, Harbor Bowl, Oil Bowl, Raisin Bowl, and Salad Bowl.) emulating the better-known contests established before World War II: the Rose, Sugar, Cotton, Orange, and Sun bowls. Like their predecessors, the new bowls were sponsored by chambers of commerce and civic organizations to promote and publicize various cities and their goods or services. Evansville at the time took pride in being known as the "refrigerator capital of the United States." In the postwar years, the city was home to three refrigerator manufacturers employing 10,000 workers, and produced 3,800 refrigerators per day.

The Evansville Junior Chamber of Commerce (Jaycees) was responsible for running the game. Proceeds from it were used "to help support worthy youth charities" in the city. The most outstanding player of the Refrigerator Bowl received the William A. Carson Award, and the YMCA's Camp Carson was the game's primary beneficiary. Both were named after a prominent local businessman.

The Refrigerator Bowl was distinctive among the new post-World War II bowls in being contested on the first weekend in December rather than on or around New Years Day. And whereas most of its peers discontinued play by 1950, some after just a year or two, it survived well into the new decade. While the first two Refrigerator Bowls featured the local university, Evansville, the game ultimately attracted teams from as far away as Idaho and Rhode Island. At the time, the bowl's participants were all considered "small college" programs, but seven of them (Note: The seven programs that advanced to FBS are: Arkansas State, Delaware, Jacksonville State, Kent State, Middle Tennessee, Sam Houston State, and Western Kentucky.) eventually grew to compete at the highest level of the sport, in the NCAA Division I Football Bowl Subdivision (FBS).

The 1956 contest attracted just 3,000 fans, less than a third of the bowl's peak attendance, putting the future of the game in doubt. In late August 1957, the Jaycees finally announced the demise of the Refrigerator Bowl, citing "the lack of public support" and failure to find a sponsor for the event. That same year, the city's largest manufacturer of refrigerators, the Servel Corporation, went bankrupt and closed its plant, signaling the beginning of the end of the city's golden age as "the refrigerator capital of the United States."

== Game results ==
Date played	Winning team		Losing team		Attendance	Notes
December 4, 1948	Evansville	13	Missouri Valley	7	7,500	
December 3, 1949	Evansville	22	Hillsdale	7	5,500–6,000	
December 2, 1950	Abilene Christian	13	Gustavus Adolphus	7	7,500–8,000	
December 2, 1951	Arkansas State	46	Camp Breckinridge	12	9,000	
December 7, 1952	Western Kentucky	34	Arkansas State	19	9,500	
December 6, 1953	Sam Houston State	14	College of Idaho	12	8,500	
December 5, 1954	Delaware	19	Kent State	7	4,500	
December 4, 1955	Jacksonville State	12	Rhode Island	10	6,000	
December 1, 1956	Sam Houston State	27	Middle Tennessee	13	3,000	
