= Missouri College Athletic Union =

The Missouri College Athletic Union (MCAU) was an intercollegiate athletic conference that existed from 1924 to 1971. It consisted primarily of private universities from the state of Missouri that departed the Missouri Intercollegiate Athletic Association after its 1924 reorganization. In 1970, the MCAU was reorganized as the Heart of America Athletic Conference (HAAC). However, the HAAC does not claim the Athletic Union's history.

Albert L. Weiser was appointed the first commissioner of the MCAU in 1963.

== Member schools ==
=== Final members ===
Institution	Location	Founded	Affiliation	Enrollment	Nickname	Joined	Left	Current conference
Central Methodist University	Fayette, Missouri	1854	United Methodist	1,094	Eagles	1924–25	1970–71	Heart of America (HAAC) (NAIA)
Culver–Stockton College	Canton, Missouri	1853	Disciples of Christ	1,066	Wildcats	1924–25	1970–71	Heart of America (HAAC) (NAIA)
Drury University	Springfield, Missouri	1873	UCC & DOC	1,409	Panthers	1924–25	1970–71	Great Lakes Valley (GLVC)
Graceland University	Lamoni, Iowa	1895	Community of Christ	2,301	Yellowjackets	1960–61	1970–71	Heart of America (HAAC) (NAIA)
Missouri Valley University	Marshall, Missouri	1889	Presbyterian (PCUSA)	1,728	Vikings	1924–25	1970–71	Heart of America (HAAC) (NAIA)
Tarkio College	Tarkio, Missouri	1883	UPCUSA	N/A	Owls	1924–25	1970–71	closed in 1992
William Jewell College	Liberty, Missouri	1849	Nonsectarian	738	Cardinals	1924–25	1970–71	Great Lakes Valley (GLVC)

=== Former members ===
Institution	Location	Founded	Affiliation	Enrollment	Nickname	Joined	Left	Current conference
Central Wesleyan College	Warrenton, Missouri	1854	Methodist Church	N/A	N/A	1924–25	1940–41	closed in 1941
University of Missouri–Rolla (Note: Joined as Missouri School of Mines and Metallurgy. Later became the University of Missouri at Rolla in 1964, with the "at" replaced by an en dash in 1968. The current name known as Missouri University of Science & Technology was adopted since 2008.)	Rolla, Missouri	1870	Public (Note: Part of the University of Missouri System.)	6,086	Miners	1924–25	1932–33	Great Lakes Valley (GLVC) (NCAA D-II)
Westminster College	Fulton, Missouri	1851	Presbyterian	1,050	Blue Jays	1924–25	1931–32	St. Louis (SLIAC) (NCAA D-III)

=== Membership timeline ===
Full member (all sports) Full member (non-football)

== Football champions ==
- 1924 – Westminster (MO)
- 1925 – Missouri Wesleyan
- 1926 – Westminster (MO)
- 1927 – Missouri Valley
- 1928 – Central (MO)
- 1929 – Missouri Valley
- 1930 – Central (MO)
- 1931 – Westminster (MO)
- 1932 – Missouri Valley
- 1933 – Missouri Valley
- 1934 – Central (MO)
- 1935 – Missouri Valley
- 1936 – Missouri Valley and William Jewell
- 1937 – Tarkio and William Jewell
- 1938 – William Jewell
- 1939 – Culver–Stockton and Missouri Valley

- 1940 – Culver–Stockton
- 1941 – Missouri Valley
- 1942 – Missouri Valley
- 1943 – No champion
- 1944 – No champion
- 1945 – No champion
- 1946 – Missouri Valley
- 1947 – Missouri Valley
- 1948 – Missouri Valley
- 1949 – Missouri Valley
- 1950 – William Jewell
- 1951 – Missouri Valley
- 1952 – Missouri Valley
- 1953 – William Jewell
- 1954 – Missouri Valley and William Jewell
- 1955 – Missouri Valley

- 1956 – William Jewell
- 1957 – Culver–Stockton
- 1958 – Missouri Valley
- 1959 – William Jewell
- 1960 – Missouri Valley and William Jewell
- 1961 – Missouri Valley
- 1962 – William Jewell
- 1963 – William Jewell
- 1964 – William Jewell
- 1965 – William Jewell
- 1966 – Tarkio and William Jewell
- 1967 – Tarkio and William Jewell
- 1968 – William Jewell
- 1969 – Culver–Stockton and William Jewell
- 1970 – Missouri Valley

== See also ==
- List of defunct college football conferences
