= Tarkio College =

Private college in Tarkio, Missouri, US (1883–1992)

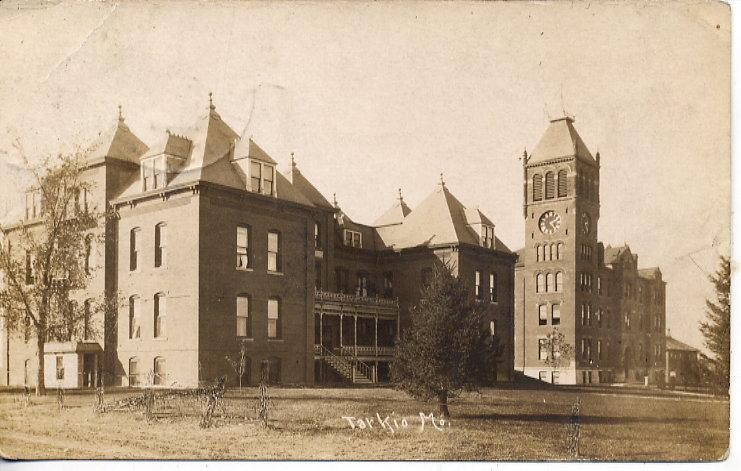
- Tarkio College, c. 1910
- Other names: Tarkio Technology Institute (dba), Tarkio Tech
- Type: Private
- Active: 1883–1992, 2019-
- Religious affiliation: United Presbyterian Church in the USA, Presbyterian Church (USA)
- Location: Tarkio, Missouri, U.S. 40.443032°N 95.39234°W
- Nickname: Owls
- Sporting affiliations: NAIA – HAAC (until 1992)
- Mascot: Owl

Tarkio College was a college that operated in Tarkio, Missouri, from 1883 to 1992. The institution was supported by the United Presbyterian Church in the United States of America, followed by the Presbyterian Church (USA). It was closed after filing for bankruptcy protection in 1991 and then was reopened in 2019 as Tarkio Technology Institute, a continuing education institution for professionals.

== History ==
The original building for what became Tarkio College was built by residents of Tarkio two years after the founding of the town to be the new courthouse to replace Rock Port. This proved premature because in an 1883 vote, the county voted to keep the county seat where it was. The new, empty building was then decided to be used as a college, and Tarkio Valley College and Normal Institute was founded.

Samuel C. Marshall was the first president and William E. Walker served as the last president.

The Tarkio College mascot was the owl. The school colors were purple and white, and the college's motto, often attributed to its founder, wealthy farmer David Rankin, was "Set Fire, Tarkio!"

The average enrollment in the 1930s was 250 students.

One of the school's most famous structures was the Mule Barn Theatre, an octagon-shaped structure used originally to house mules. It was on the National Register of Historic Places but was destroyed by fire in 1989.

After Tarkio College closed, the library books were purchased by and moved to Lancaster Bible College, Lancaster, Pennsylvania. There were also several attempts to find alternative uses for the property, including early discussions about the possible founding of a new institution, Tarkio Valley College. Initially, Youth Services International, Inc. operated Tarkio Academy, a residential and community-based educational program for juveniles between 1995 and 2004. North Central Missouri College and Linn State College (called State Technical College of Missouri since July 2014) in Linn, Missouri, then announced an exploration of options for a new jointly operated technical college in early 2006. This was soon followed by reports that the property would become the Midwest Institute of Energy, a private college. The institute missed its planned opening of 2009.

The Tarkio College Alumni Association preserved the original Tarkio College 1883 corporation and began the process to reopen the college in 2012 with a revised mission of providing continuing education for professionals as mandated for them by various state agencies, licensing boards or accrediting agencies. It does not provide academic credits at this time. Education and training will be available at locations throughout the United States as traditional seminars, online classes, interactive webinars—and also at the home campus in Tarkio, MO. The Alumni Association has rented the main building on the Tarkio campus, Rankin Hall, and is in the process of restoring this 1931 landmark. Robert A. Hughes, Tarkio College Class of 1971, is the current president of the newly reorganized college.

In September 2019, Tarkio College Inc.received a Certificate of Operation from the Missouri Department of Higher Education. Operating as Tarkio Technology Institute, TTI or Tarkio Tech, as it is known locally offers technical certification courses for professionals in Plumbing, Wind Energy, and Welding.

January 6, 2020, TTI welcomed its first student in the welding program. The fall of 2020 marked the first official full year of classes in the three program areas originally approved by the state in September 2019.

In 2021, instruction was added in HVAC and computer repair and maintenance.

== Educational records ==
After the college closed, student transcript records were transferred to Northwest Missouri State University.

== Athletics ==
The Tarkio athletic teams were called the Owls. The college was a member of the National Association of Intercollegiate Athletics (NAIA), primarily competing in the Heart of America Athletic Conference (HAAC) from 1971–72 to 1991–92. The Owls previously competed in the Missouri College Athletic Union (MCAU) from 1924–25 to 1970–71.

=== Accomplishments ===
Tarkio College won the first NAIA Division I Men's basketball championship in 1940, defeating San Diego State 52–31. Tarkio College's softball team appeared in one Women's College World Series in 1976.

== Notable alumni ==
- Wallace Hume Carothers taught at Harvard University and is credited with the discovery of the artificial polymers nylon and neoprene.
- Carl Djerassi is a pharmaceutical chemist who attended Tarkio College but completed his undergraduate education at Kenyon College, then got his PhD from the University of Wisconsin.
- Edgar Lee Hewett is an anthropologist who received a degree in pedagogy from Tarkio College
- John M. Riggs, US Army General
- Marco Rubio, 72nd United States Secretary of State, former US Senator and 2016 presidential candidate, attended the college for one year on a football scholarship before moving on to Santa Fe College in Florida.
- T Allen Reynolds graduated in 1960 and went on to play professional football with the Dallas Texans 1960–62 and the Kansas City Chiefs 1963–67
- John H. Eastwood was a chaplain in the United States Army 464th Bombardment Group during World War II.
- Neil M. Stevenson, former Chief of Chaplains of the United States Navy.

== See also ==
- List of defunct colleges and universities in Missouri
