= Central Methodist Eagles =

- University: Central Methodist University
- Nickname: Eagles
- NAIA: Region V
- Conference: HAAC (primary)
- Athletic director: Natasha Wilson
- Location: Fayette, Missouri
- Varsity teams: 19
- Football stadium: Davis Field
- Basketball arena: Puckett Field House
- Baseball stadium: Estes Baseball Field
- Colors: Green and white
- Mascot: Eddie the Eagle
- Website: cmueagles.com
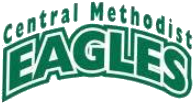

The Central Methodist Eagles are the athletic teams that represent Central Methodist University, located in Fayette, Missouri, in intercollegiate sports as a member of the National Association of Intercollegiate Athletics (NAIA), primarily competing in the Heart of America Athletic Conference (HAAC) since the 1991–92 academic year; which they were a member on a previous stint from 1971–72 to 1985–86. The Eagles previously competed as an NAIA Independent from 1986–87 to 1990–91; and in the Missouri College Athletic Union (MCAU) from 1924–25 to 1970–71.

== Varsity teams ==
Central Methodist competes in 21 intercollegiate varsity sports:

- Men's sports include baseball, basketball, bowling, cross country, football, golf, soccer, track & field and wrestling;
- Women’s sports include basketball, bowling, cross country, golf, soccer, softball, track & field, volleyball and wrestling
- Co-ed sports include competitive cheer, competitive dance and eSports.

== National championships ==
=== Team ===
Sport	Association	Division	Year	Opponent/Runner-up	Score
Men's soccer (2)	NAIA	Single	2018	Missouri Valley	1–1, (4–3 pen.)
Men's soccer (2)	NAIA	Single	2019	Hastings	3–1

== Individual sports ==
=== Men's Basketball ===
CMU Eagles men's basketball team first appeared in the NAIA tournament in 1943.

=== Rugby ===
In the 1970s Central Methodist had a rugby team that enjoyed some national success. Roger B. Wilson, who later became Governor of Missouri, was a member of Central Methodist's rugby teams in the early 1970s. In that time Central Methodist regularly beat opponents such as the University of Missouri and posted the most lopsided victory in the history of sanctioned American rugby to that time (77-0 over St. Louis University). In 1973 Central Methodist won a regional rugby tournament by defeating the University of Missouri 32-4 in the championship game. Central Methodist then entered the national championship tournament, defeating the University of Notre Dame 24-10 and the University of Michigan 29-4 to reach the national semi-finals. Central Methodist lost its semi-final match to the University of Illinois 13-3 but won the consolation match to finish third in the nation.

=== Men's Soccer ===
The men's soccer program, led by coach Alex Nichols and assisted by David Macsicza, Marc Russell, and Rafael Ortiz Ferreira, won the 2018 NAIA National Championship.

=== Softball ===
CMU Eagles softball head coach Pat Reardon became the winningest coach in the Heart of America Athletic Conference history, after a game-one win over Evangel (Mo.) on April 4, 2015, as he surpassed the Crusaders' Jerry Breaux. He also moved into the Top 10 on the NAIA active coaches wins list.

== Fight song ==
In the late spring of 2006 Central Methodist University adopted an official fight song written by Andrew Glover, a 1983 alumnus of Central Methodist College, called Fighting Eagles. The previous unofficial fight song had been Hail, Victory written by Central College alum and former drum major Robert Earl Stepp.
