= Culver–Stockton College =

Christian college in Canton, Missouri, U.S.

- Former name: Christian University (1853–1917)
- Type: Private
- Established: 1853; 173 years ago
- Religious affiliation: Christian Church (Disciples of Christ)
- Endowment: $45.1 million (2025)
- President: Lauren B. Schellenberger
- Students: 1,028 (Fall 2024)
- Location: Canton, Missouri, U.S. 40.1295°N 91.5309°W
- Campus: 140 acres (56.7 ha)
- Colors: Royal Blue, Gray and White
- Nickname: Wildcats
- Sporting affiliations: NAIA – HAAC
- Website: www.culver.edu

Culver–Stockton College is a private Christian liberal arts college in Canton, Missouri, United States. It was originally named Christian University in 1853 becoming the first collegiate institution west of the Mississippi River. It was chartered specifically for men and women.

== History ==
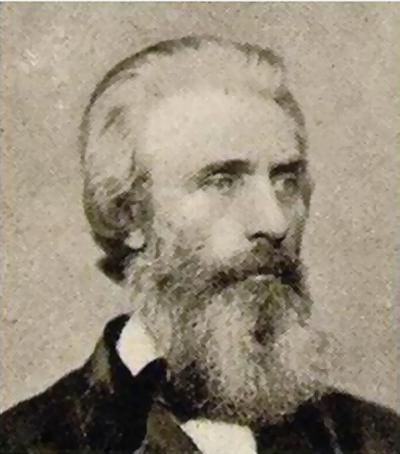
D. Pat. Henderson

In the 1850s, Pat Henderson and other Christian Church (Disciples of Christ) leaders were interested in creating an institution for the education of male and female students. Describing the site of the college that he had helped to select, Henderson said:

Here on the summit of two of a circle of hills, divided by a vale so virgin in its primitive luxuriance of forest and tangled wood that twilight lingers at midday beneath its bough, are to arise the structures dedicated to the equal culture of the male and female mind.

In 1853, the college's founders were granted a charter by the State of Missouri to establish Christian University, in which classes began in 1855. It was the first institution of higher learning west of the Mississippi River. James Shannon became the college's first president the following year.

=== Civil War ===
After a local scuffle between Southern and Northern sympathizers, federal troops were sent to Canton in July 1861 where they occupied the school's only building. The troops left after a short stay. Another wave of federal troops arrived in October 1861 and took forcible possession of the Old Main. They occupied it until early December 1862, using the building as a base for expeditions to fight Confederate units, chase down deserters, and seize property of disloyal citizens. They left Old Main a ghostly shell with broken doors and windows and locks, burned seats, and much of the furniture and teaching materials carried off or destroyed. Many trees on campus had been felled and the fences burned. It was nearly the death of Christian University. Under the leadership of B. H. Smith, the college reopened in 1865, but made little financial and physical progress until Carl Johann became president in 1902. When Old Main burned in 1903, the building was replaced by Henderson Hall.

=== College renamed ===
The college changed its name in 1917 to identify donors Mary Culver and Robert Stockton. Stockton was Culver's husband's business partner.

=== Presidents ===
The first was James Shannon. Shannon served as president of State College of Louisiana, Bacon College in Kentucky, and the University of Missouri before coming to Christian University in August 1856. He served as president until his death in 1859.

Since Shannon's tenure, 27 presidents have served the university:

1. James Shannon (1856–1859)
2. Benjamin Harrison Smith (1865–1875)
3. Winthrop Hartley Hopson (1875–1877)
4. Reuben Lindsay Cave (1877–1881)
5. John Clopton Reynolds (1881–1883)
6. Oval Pirkey (1883–1886)
7. John Huffman Hardin (1886–1888)
8. Thomas Franklin Campbell (1888–1889)
9. Simpson Ely (1889–1893)
10. Perry O. Powell (1893–1894)
11. Benjamin H. Smith (2nd term) (1894–1895)
12. Clinton Lockhart (1895–1900)
13. David Roberts Dungan (1900–1902)
14. Carl Johann (1902–1914)
15. Earl Marion Todd (1914–1917)
16. John Hepler Wood (1917–1937)
17. Walker Harrison McDonald (1937–1950)
18. Leslie Edward Ziegler (1950–1956)
19. Fred Helsabeck (1956–1973)
20. Harold Charles Doster (1973–1977)
21. Robert Windsor Brown (1978–1989)
22. Walter Swanson Reuling (1989–1992)
23. Edwin Batton Strong (1992–2003)
24. William L. Fox (2003–2009)
25. Richard D. Valentine (2009–2014)
26. Kelly M. Thompson (2014–2020)
27. Douglas B. Palmer (2020–2023)
28. Lauren B. Schellenberger (2023–present)

In 2012, Richard Valentine launched the first capital campaign in 20 years which increased the endowment from $15.8 million in 2009 to $21.0 million.

Kelly M. Thompson (hired in 2014) was the college's first woman president. Highlights of her tenure were the construction of the Carolyn L. and Robert W. Brown Residence Hall and the completion of a comprehensive campaign designed to raise $25 million in eight years, but it only took six years to raise $34 million. Enrollment grew from 752 in 2011 to 1,134 in 2017.

== Campus ==
=== Buildings ===
Most of the buildings on today's Culver–Stockton campus have been built since 1937. Much construction and complete renovation of the major buildings on campus have taken place since 1980.

==== Henderson Hall ====
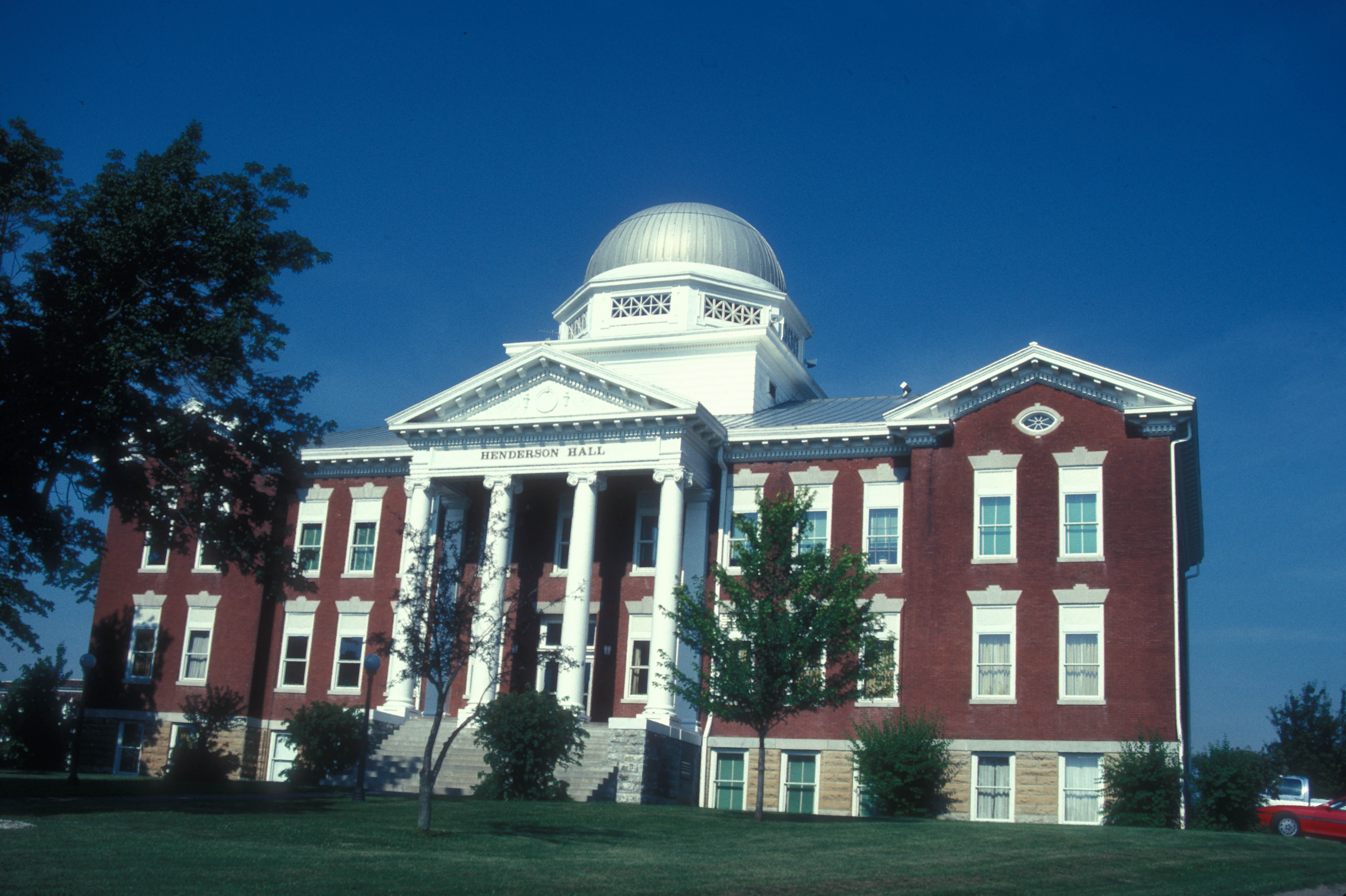
Henderson Hall, now on the National Register of Historic Places

The first building on Culver–Stockton Campus was Old Main, known today as Henderson Hall. Construction began in 1853 and was completed in 1855. The building was destroyed by fire on March 23, 1903. In keeping with a tradition that carries on today, students didn't miss one day of school. Officials organized classes in local churches. College President Carl Johann resolved to rebuild; and within 10 days of the fire, the citizens of Canton raised $15,000 for a new building. The college collected $8,000 from insurance and salvaged $4,000 worth of stone and brick from the old building. The new building was completed and occupied by May 15, 1904, at a final cost of $42,000. Since funds were still short to complete payment, orator and three-time presidential candidate William Jennings Bryan spoke on campus on August 24, 1904, to help raise funds. It is a two-story red brick structure with a full basement. Styled in the Neo-Classical manner, the building is dominated by a colossal, tetrastyle Ionic portico and crowned by a dome. Since the original building had a dome, a dome also was part of the new construction. The dome on Henderson Hall continues to be an important symbol of the college to this day. Henderson Hall originally housed science laboratories, men's and women's gymnasiums, a museum, a dining room, a "commercial" department, library, administrative offices, classrooms, an assembly hall that seated about 600 with a rolling door at the rear that could be opened to add 400 more spectators, and three meeting rooms for student groups. As educational activities were dispersed to other buildings, Henderson Hall continued to serve, as it does today, as a primarily administrative and classroom building. The new building was named for D. Pat Henderson, one of the founders and first president of the board of trustees. Henderson was a church leader, an editor and publisher of religious publications, and a tireless public servant. He was instrumental in the founding of Eureka College and Columbia College in addition to Culver–Stockton. He served in several governmental social service capacities during and after the Civil War. He was an outspoken advocate of education for women. Henderson Hall was named to the National Register of Historic Places in 1975.

==== Johnson Hall ====
Johnson Hall originally was called Culver–Stockton Hall when it was built in 1912 as a "co-educational" residence hall. It was built by W.R. Oder and designed by J. Hal Lynch. The building was shaped in an elongated T with the girls housed in one arm of the T and the boys on the other side. There would be 44 rooms, each housing two students. A superintendent's office was built in the middle to maintain no communication between the sides. Culver–Stockton historically considered the physical fitness of the student body a high priority, so a 50 x 79 foot gymnasium 25-foot high ceilings occupied the main floor of the center section. A swimming pool measuring 20 by 58 feet was located in the basement, along with a dining hall and laundry. The hall represents an early collaboration between important pioneer donors, Mary Culver and Robert Stockton, each of whom contributed $25,000. The dormitory wings of Johnson burned in a spectacular fire on the night of Jan. 9, 1924, but they were rebuilt to house 100 women. Male students moved to another building. A new gymnasium building with a swimming pool was constructed on a nearby site, and the old gymnasium and swimming pool area was remodeled into parlors, classrooms, meeting rooms, practice rooms and a YWCA room. A $250,000 renovation of Culver-Stockton Hall was part of a development drive called Project Renaissance in 1979. Trustee Reynold Johnson took up the challenge and donated $200,000. Student rooms were improved, and plush carpet, new lighting and furniture was added to the lounge. The Board of Trustees voted in October 1980 to change the name of Culver-Stockton Hall to Reynold C. and Mabel F. Johnson Hall. Today's students still live in Johnson Hall, which was renovated again in 1996. Each suite has two bedrooms and a bathroom, designed to house four students.

==== Carl Johann Memorial Library ====
The college library had been housed in Henderson Hall until 1947, when the need for a separate library/classroom building became acute. The building was named after Carl Johann, an important early college president. The original building housed the bookstore/soda fountain, a projection room, a phonograph room, and a museum in the basement. The second floor was used for administrative offices and classrooms. The library and the headquarters of the Disciples of Christ Historical Society were on the third floor. Administrative offices were moved back to Henderson after renovations were completed, and offices in Johann were remodeled for faculty.

==== Ellison A. Poulton Memorial Stadium ====
The Ellison A. Poulton Memorial Stadium was dedicated at Homecoming in 1953 to Ellison A. Poulton, a Canton native. While a student at Culver–Stockton, he played on the football team. He graduated from Culver–Stockton in 1919 and Harvard Law School in 1922. When Poulton died in 1945, he left an unrestricted bequest of $200,000. Culver-Stockton officials announced in 1946 that a science hall would be named after Poulton, but four years later, school officials no longer felt a science building was needed. Instead, the football stadium was named after him. The first football game was played in Poulton Stadium on Sept. 18, 1948, when Monmouth College defeated the Wildcats 12–6. The stadium was not dedicated until the centennial homecoming on October 17, 1953. Roy D. Wilcox Memorial Pressbox, named in honor of a C-SC alum, was added in 2003, replacing the original one-room press box built in 1953. It contains several rooms, including separate rooms for each coaching staff, a media room, a room for game-day personnel, a private room for special guests and a VIP room on the upper level.

==== Carla Rifkind Warsaw Memorial Chapel of All Faiths ====
Required daily chapel was a ritual of academic life at Culver–Stockton from the beginning. In the 1960s one focus of student unrest was required chapel. Ultimately, required chapel services were eliminated. Voluntary chapel service continued reflecting the historic affiliation with the Christian Church (Disciples of Christ) and the mission of the college. Services were held in an assortment of places including an outdoor chapel on the northeast corner of campus.

In 1970 the college began planning the new Gladys Crown Student Center named for the wife of Col. Henry Crown, prominent businessman and philanthropist. Connected to the east wing is the Carla Rifkind Warsaw Memorial Chapel of All Faiths. The chapel contains centers for worship and meditation for Protestant, Catholic and Jewish students. Rabbi Louis Binstock of Chicago led the dedication service in 1972. Long-time art professor, Grant Kenner created the All Faiths Frieze encircling the chapel interior in 1973–1976. The frieze displays an original ecumenical emblem designed by Prof. Kenner and 44 other symbols representing the great religions of the world. In 2002, Professor Kenner created stained glass and metal doors for the chapel.

==== Herrick Foundation Center ====
The Herrick Foundation Center, renovated in 1983 from the L.L. Culver Gymnasium, built in 1925, was named for the Herrick Foundation which contributed funds toward the building. A center for business and art, the building features classrooms, offices and seminar rooms, a 125-seat auditorium, five art studios, a general computer lab and a graphic arts lab, and the Mabee Art Gallery, located in a two-story gallery that hosts several professional art exhibitions are planned annually as well as faculty and student art shows.

==== Robert W. Brown Performing Arts Center ====
The Robert W. Brown Performing Arts Center was added to Alexander Campbell Auditorium in 1990. It is named in honor of Robert W. Brown, president emeritus. The state-of-the-art Performing Arts Center houses all three of Culver–Stockton's performing spaces. The Alexander Campbell Auditorium, which was built in 1966, is a 900-seat proscenium theatre used for musicals and larger theatre productions. Mabee Little Theatre is a flexible seating "Black Box" experimental theatre, used for theatre department productions and student-directed productions. The Performing Arts Center also houses practice and rehearsal rooms, dressing rooms, a costume shop, orchestra pit, the music computer lab, piano lab, faculty studios, and classrooms.

==== Science Center ====
Opened for classes in 2002, the Science Center is Culver–Stockton College's newest academic building. The facility houses the college's science, mathematics and computer information systems academic departments. The Science Center features the John A. Sperry Jr. Astronomical Observation Platform, Carolyn L. Brown Lecture Hall, a computer lab, several science laboratories, classrooms and faculty offices.

=== The "Hill" ===
Throughout the college's history the "Hill" has been an enduring symbol of the college. In 1964, after much discussion, a roadway was built connecting Lewis Street and Henderson Hall. The site was named after Ada Wallace Roberts, a long-time English professor and administrator. At the base of the hill was placed a memorial with the names of those alumni who had given their lives in World War II.

== Academics ==
Culver–Stockton College offers bachelor's degrees in many different fields of study. Also, through its Online Campus, courses can be taken in an 8-week accelerated format.

The 2023–2024 listed tuition and fees are $29,420 and room and board is $9,505. Over 90% who apply for financial aid receive it. On average, need-based aid covered 72% of students' costs. The student-faculty ratio at Culver–Stockton College is 15:1, and the school has 59.9 percent of its classes with fewer than 20 students.

The most popular undergraduate majors are Business Administration and Management; Sport and Fitness Administration/Management; Psychology; Registered Nursing/Registered Nurse; and Criminal Justice/Law Enforcement Administration. The college is divided into three large divisions as of July 1, 2014, which contain many different majors and programs. An individualized major is also an option. The three new divisions are labeled Applied Liberal Arts and Sciences (ALAS), Fine, Applied, and Literary Arts (FALA), and Business, Education, and Law (BEL). In addition, Culver–Stockton partners with the Blessing-Rieman College of Nursing and Health Sciences in Quincy, Illinois, just across the river, to offer a four-year nursing degree.

C-SC offers four graduate programs including a Master of Arts in Counseling, Master of Athletic Training, Master of Business Administration, and Master of Education. The Master of Arts in Counseling program has two available specializations: school counseling and clinical mental health counseling.

== Athletics ==
The Culver–Stockton athletic teams are called the Wildcats. Culver–Stockton competes in 21 intercollegiate varsity sports: Men's sports include baseball, basketball, bowling, football, golf, soccer, track & field and volleyball; while women's sports include basketball, bowling, golf, lacrosse, soccer, softball, track and field and volleyball; and co-ed sports include cheerleading, dance, eSports and shotgun sports. Complete records of all teams are available online.

== Student life ==
Over a third of the men (36%) live in fraternities and a third of the women (39%) live in sororities. The sororities are housed in three separate buildings located near the center of campus. The fraternities, with two exceptions, are housed in fraternity park which was completed in 1996.

Culver–Stockton College previously had a campus radio station, KCSW-LP 97.1, whose broadcast license expired in 2021.

== Notable alumni ==
- Mike Bloomgren, football coach
- Michèle Crider, opera singer
- Jack Fascinato, musician
- Bob Hendren, football player
- Jason Kaiser, football player
- Harold Kottman, basketball player
- Edward V. Long, U.S. Senator from Missouri from 1960 to 1968
- Craig Redmon, member of the Missouri House of Representatives from 2011 to 2018
- Larry Thompson, served as United States Deputy Attorney General from May 10, 2001, to August 31, 2003
