= National Register of Historic Places listings in Platte County, Missouri =

Location of Platte County in Missouri

This is a list of the National Register of Historic Places listings in Platte County, Missouri, USA.

This is intended to be a complete list of the properties and districts on the National Register of Historic Places in Platte County, Missouri, United States. Latitude and longitude coordinates are provided for many National Register properties and districts; these locations may be seen together in a map.

There are 16 properties and districts listed on the National Register in the county.

This National Park Service list is complete through NPS recent listings posted March 14, 2025.

== Current listings ==
	Name on the Register	Image	Date listed	Location	City or town	Description
1	Babcock Site		November 15, 1973 (#73001049)	Address Restricted	Waldron	
2	Benjamin Banneker School	Benjamin Banneker School	September 22, 1995 (#95001115)	31 W. Eighth St. 39°11′34″N 94°41′06″W	Parkville	
3	Deister Archeological Site		January 21, 1970 (#70000347)	Address Restricted	Kansas City	
4	Frederick Krause Mansion	Frederick Krause Mansion	May 22, 1978 (#78001672)	3rd and Harrel Ferrel Dr. 39°22′09″N 94°46′51″W	Platte City	
5	Mackay Building	Mackay Building	April 6, 1979 (#79001389)	Park College; 39°11′N 94°41′W	Parkville	
6	McCormick Distillery	McCormick Distillery	April 16, 1974 (#74001090)	MO JJ; 39°23′54″N 94°52′43″W	Weston	
7	Missouri District Warehouse	Missouri District Warehouse	July 19, 2010 (#10000476)	357 Main St. 39°22′15″N 94°46′47″W	Weston	
8	Platte County Courthouse	Platte County Courthouse	January 17, 1979 (#79001390)	3rd and Main Sts. 39°22′15″N 94°46′47″W	Platte City	
9	Pleasant Ridge United Baptist Church	Pleasant Ridge United Baptist Church	March 13, 2002 (#02000162)	Junction of MO P and Woodruff Rd. 39°25′53″N 94°51′21″W	Weston	
10	Renner Village Archeological Site		April 16, 1969 (#69000123)	Renner-Brenner Site Park; 39°10′31″N 94°36′54″W	Riverside	
11	Charles Smith Scott Memorial Observatory	Charles Smith Scott Memorial Observatory	May 29, 1992 (#92000625)	8700 River Park Dr. 39°11′24″N 94°40′45″W	Parkville	Destroyed by fire in 1999.
12	Sugar Creek Site		December 12, 1973 (#73001050)	Address Restricted	Weston	
13	TWA Administrative Offices Building	TWA Administrative Offices Building	November 6, 2007 (#07001157)	11500 Ambassador Dr. 39°18′07″N 94°40′54″W	Kansas City	
14	Waddell "A" Truss Bridge	Waddell "A" Truss Bridge	January 25, 1991 (#90002173)	English Landing Park, over Rush Cr. 39°11′09″N 94°40′55″W	Parkville	
15	Washington Chapel C.M.E. Church	Washington Chapel C.M.E. Church	August 31, 1992 (#92001055)	1137 West St. 39°11′42″N 94°41′09″W	Parkville	
16	Weston Historic District	Weston Historic District	August 21, 1972 (#72000727)	Roughly bounded by Summit, Rock, Market and Ashley; 39°24′47″N 94°54′06″W	Weston	

== See also ==
- List of National Historic Landmarks in Missouri
- National Register of Historic Places listings in Missouri
