= Mary Owens (Abraham Lincoln fiancée) =

U.S. president Abraham Lincoln's fiancée (1808–1877)

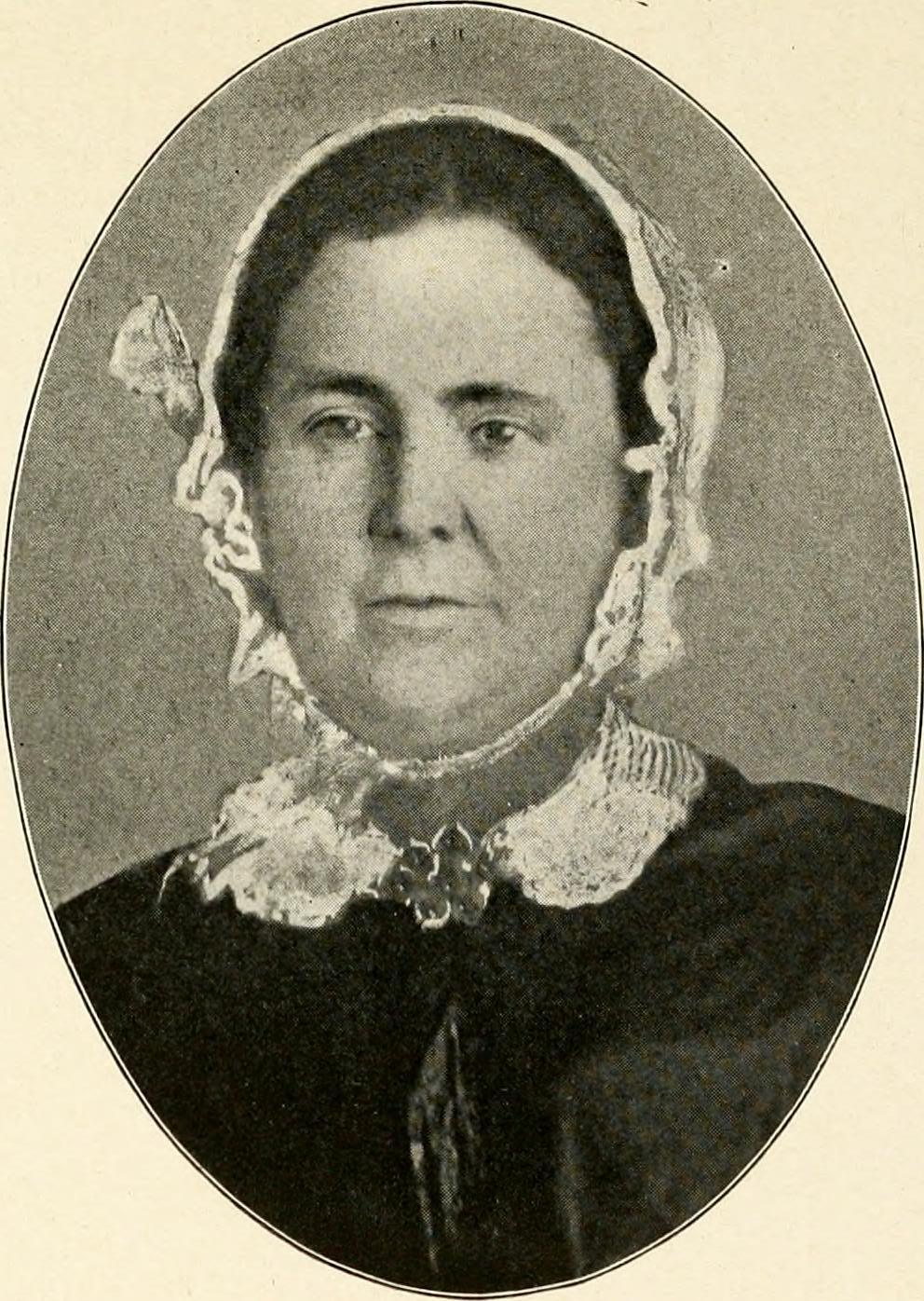
- Born: September 29, 1808; Green County, Kentucky
- Died: July 4, 1877; Weston, Missouri
- Education: Nazareth Academy
- Occupation: Teacher
- Known for: Being engaged to Abraham Lincoln in the 1830s
- Spouse: Jesse Vineyard

Mary Smith Owens (September 29, 1808 – July 4, 1877) was an American woman who was future U.S. president Abraham Lincoln's fiancée for a short time, following the 1835 death of Ann Rutledge. To his surprise and mortification, she rejected his reluctant proposal.

== Life ==
She was the daughter of Nathaniel Owens, a prosperous planter who owned a plantation in Green County, Kentucky, United States. In 1816, she attended Nazareth Academy, a Catholic school. She later taught at her father's Brush Creek Academy.

Her sister Elizabeth "Betsey" Abell was a friend of Lincoln's in New Salem, Illinois. She introduced Lincoln to Mary Owens when Owens came to visit in 1833, with an eye to playing matchmaker. After Owens went home, Lincoln said he "would marry Miss Owens if she came a second time to Illinois."

Whether he was in earnest or merely joking, Owens did return in the fall of 1836, putting Lincoln in an awkward situation. Owens considered herself engaged to Lincoln, while Lincoln's opinion of her changed upon her arrival. Her appearance had, in his eyes, deteriorated significantly in the intervening years; in an August 16, 1837, letter to Eliza Browning, he described Owens unflatteringly:

I knew she was over-size, but she now appeared a fair match for Falstaff; I knew she was called an 'old maid,' and I felt no doubt of the truth of at least half of the appelation [sic]; but now, when I beheld her, I could not for my life avoid thinking of my mother; and this, not from withered features, for her skin was too full of fat to permit its contracting in to wrinkles; but from her want of teeth, weather-beaten appearance in general, and from a kind of notion that ran in my head, that nothing could have commenced at the size of infancy, and reached her present bulk in less than thirtyfive or forty years; and, in short, I was not all pleased with her.

In an attempt to get out of his predicament, he wrote letters to Owens in which he presented himself and Springfield (having moved there in April 1837) in as unfavorable a light as he could.

Doing what was considered the honorable thing, he proposed to her. To his surprise, she rejected him, again and again, as he tried several times. Lincoln wrote of his reaction:

I finally was forced to give it up; at which I very unexpectedly found myself mortified almost beyond endurance. I was mortified, it seemed to me, in a hundred different ways. My vanity was deeply wounded by the reflection that I had been too stupid to discover her intentions, and at the same time never doubting that I understood them perfectly, and also that she, whom I had taught myself to believe nobody else would have, had actually rejected me with all my fancied greatness.

William Herndon, Lincoln's former law partner and biographer, later tracked Owens down. She informed him that "Mr. Lincoln was deficient in those little links which make up the great chain of woman's happiness".

In early 1838, Owens returned to Kentucky. She married Jesse Vineyard (1808–1862) in 1841. The couple eventually settled in Weston, Missouri, and had five children. Their sons fought in the American Civil War on the Confederate side. Jesse Vineyard and his brothers John and Bryce were members of the congregation of the Pleasant Ridge United Baptist Church in Weston, and the trio founded Pleasant Ridge College about a half a mile south of the church.

She died on July 4, 1877, in Weston, Missouri, and is interred in the church's cemetery. Her tombstone reads:

Abraham Lincoln's Other Mary
Here Lies Mary Owens Vineyard
1808–1877
Who Rejected Abraham Lincoln's Proposal of Marriage in 1837.

== Painting ==
Reynolds Jones was commissioned by the Chicago & Illinois Midland Railway Company to create an oil painting; it depicts Lincoln sitting on the ground observing Owens arriving in New Salem and walking past him. A print was used for the company's 1951 calendar. The painting was acquired by the Abraham Lincoln Presidential Library in 2013.

== Depictions ==
She was played by Catherine Burns in the miniseries Lincoln in the 1975 episode "Prairie Lawyer". In the book Abraham Lincoln and Women in Film, authors Wetta and Novelli wrote that "the scenes in which she appears offer a perceptive interpretation of her relationship with Lincoln."

The relationship is the subject of the novel Lincoln's Other Mary (1946), by Olive Carruthers. The Time magazine review stated, "she has wound fact into such a mess of taffy prose that there is no tasting the original flavor of the personalities."
