= George S. Robb =

George Seanor Robb
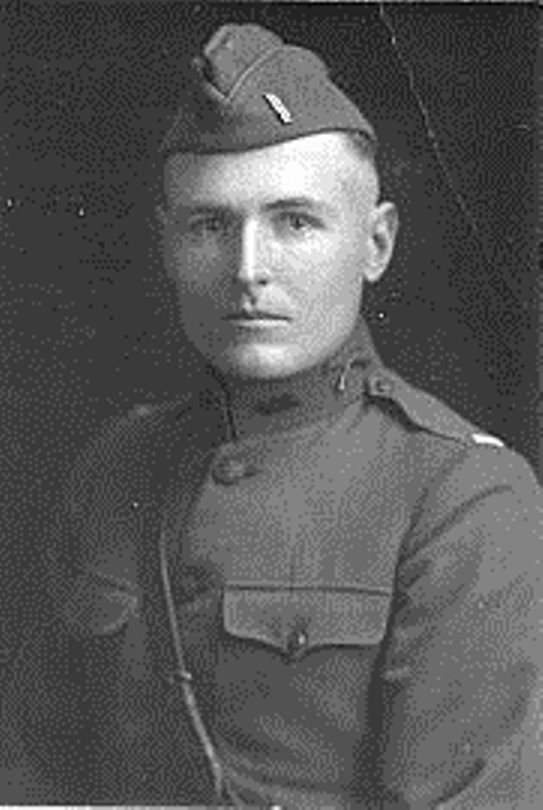
- Medal of Honor recipient
- Born: May 18, 1887; Assaria, Kansas
- Died: May 14, 1972 (aged 84); Topeka, Kansas
- Burial place: Gypsum Hill Cemetery; Salina, Kansas
- Military career
- Allegiance: United States of America
- Branch: United States Army
- Rank: First Lieutenant
- Unit: 369th Infantry Regiment
- Conflicts: World War I
- Awards: Medal of Honor; Purple Heart (3)

George Seanor Robb (May 18, 1887 – May 14, 1972) was an officer in the United States Army who received the Medal of Honor for his actions during World War I. He later served as the elected Republican Kansas State Auditor from 1935 to 1961.

== Biography ==
Robb was born in Assaria, Kansas, on May 18, 1887. He graduated from Park University in Parkville, Missouri, in 1912. In 1935, he was appointed by Governor Alfred Landon to the post of Kansas State Auditor as a Republican. He was subsequently elected twelve times before retiring in 1960. He died on May 14, 1972, in Topeka, Kansas. He is buried in Gypsum Hill Cemetery in Salina, Kansas.

== Medal of Honor citation ==
Rank and organization: First Lieutenant, U.S. Army, 369th Infantry, 93d Division. Place and date: At Sechault, France, September 29–30, 1918. Entered service at: Salina, Kansas. Born: May 18, 1887; Assaria, Kansas. General Orders: War Department, General Orders No. 16 ( January 22, 1919).

Citation:

While leading his platoon in the assault First Lieutenant Robb was severely wounded by machinegun fire, but rather than go to the rear for proper treatment he remained with his platoon until ordered to the dressing station by his commanding officer. Returning within 45 minutes, he remained on duty throughout the entire night, inspecting his lines and establishing outposts. Early the next morning he was again wounded, once again displaying his remarkable devotion to duty by remaining in command of his platoon. Later the same day a bursting shell added two more wounds, the same shell killing his commanding officer and two officers of his company. He then assumed command of the company and organized its position in the trenches. Displaying wonderful courage and tenacity at the critical times, he was the only officer of his battalion who advanced beyond the town, and by clearing machinegun and sniping posts contributed largely to the aid of his battalion in holding their objective. His example of bravery and fortitude and his eagerness to continue with his mission despite severe wounds set before the enlisted men of his command a most wonderful standard of morale and self-sacrifice.

At the time of his decoration Robb was one of only 44 Americans to have been awarded the Medal of Honor for service during World War I.

== Military Awards ==
Robb's military decorations and awards include:

1st row	Medal of Honor		
2nd row	Purple Heart w/two bronze oak leaf clusters	World War I Victory Medal w/four bronze campaign stars	Ordre national de la Légion d'honneur degree of Knight (French Republic)
3rd row	Croix de guerre 1914–1918 w/bronze palm (French Republic)	Croce al Merito di Guerra (Italy)	Орден Књаза Данила I degree of Knight (Kingdom of Montenegro)

== See also ==
- List of Medal of Honor recipients
- List of Medal of Honor recipients for World War I

== Footnotes ==
Party political offices
Preceded by Will J. French	Republican nominee for Kansas State Auditor; 1936, 1938, 1940, 1942, 1944, 1946, 1948, 1950, 1952, 1954, 1956, 1958	Succeeded by Clay E. Hedrick
