= Platte County Courthouse =

Platte County Courthouse may refer to:

- Platte County Courthouse (Missouri), Platte City, Missouri
- Platte County Courthouse (Nebraska), Columbus, Nebraska
- Platte County Courthouse (Wyoming), Wheatland, Wyoming
