= Charles Smith Scott Memorial Observatory =

- U.S. National Register of Historic Places
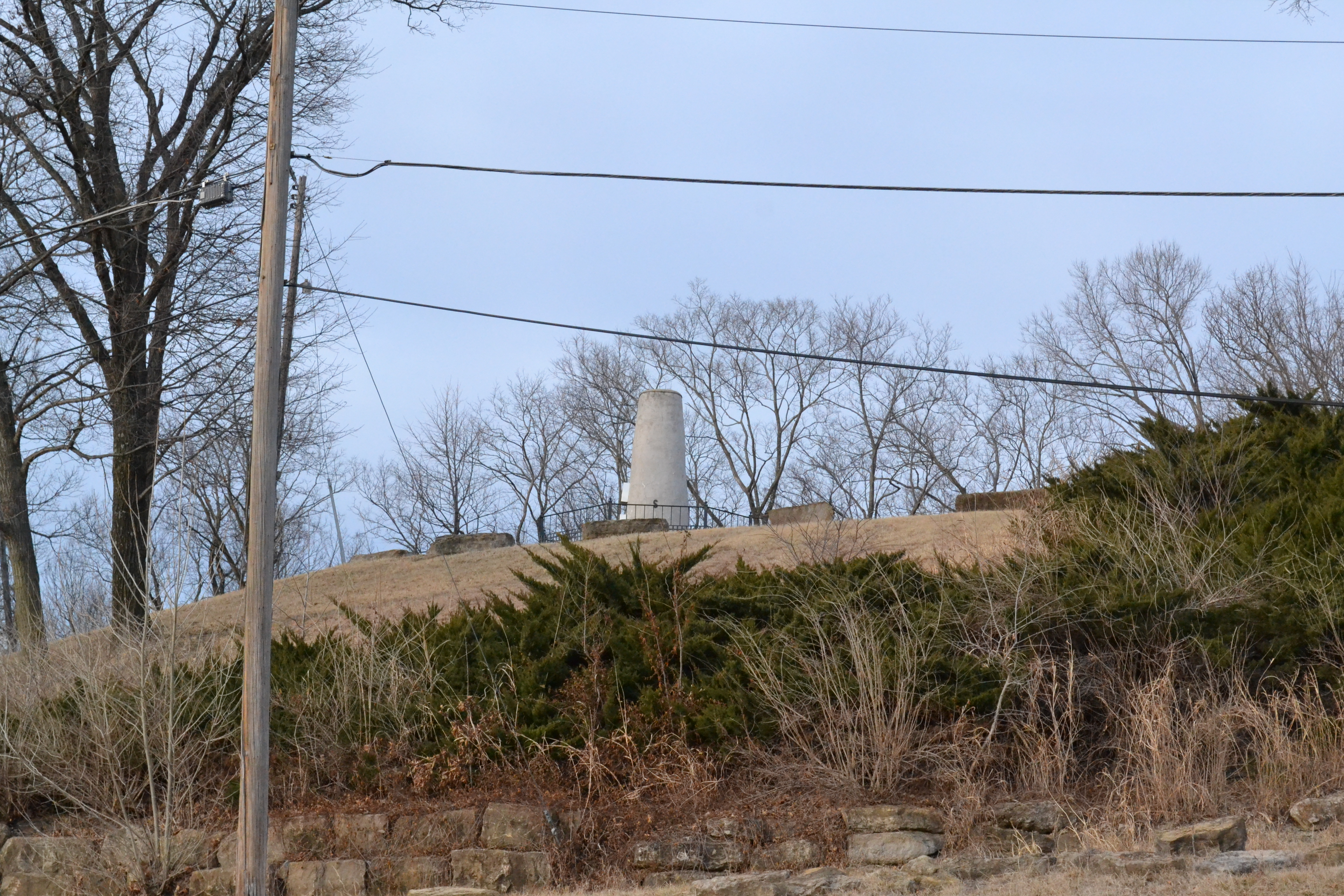

- Location within Missouri Location within the United States
- Location: 8700 River Park Dr., Parkville, Missouri
- Coordinates: 39°11′24″N 94°40′45″W
- Area: 4.1 acres (1.7 ha)
- Built: 1896
- Architect: Mattoon, A.M.; Breen, Charles Patrick
- Architectural style: Modified T Plan Observatory
- NRHP reference No.: 92000625
- Added to NRHP: May 29, 1992

Charles Smith Scott Memorial Observatory, also known as Park College Observatory, is a historic observatory located on the campus of Park University at Parkville, Platte County, Missouri. It was built in 1896, and is a variation of the "T"-plan observatory building style constructed of ashlar limestone blocks. It features an octagonal two-story domed tower.

It was listed on the National Register of Historic Places in 1992. The observatory burned down in 1999 and was subsequently razed.

== See also ==
- List of astronomical observatories
