= Mayme Schweble =

American prospector and politician (1974–1943)

Member of the Nevada Assembly for Nye County
- In office November 1924 – November 1926

Personal details
- Born: August 5, 1874 Weston, Missouri, U.S.
- Died: January 25, 1943 (aged 68) San Francisco, California, U.S.
- Resting place: Churchill County Cemetery, Fallon, Nevada
- Party: Republican
- Spouse(s): A previous husband (Note: Bennett states that she was twice-married, but does not indicate when her first marriage was, how it ended, or what her first husband's name was.) John Hunter Schweble (m. 1908; died 1930)
- Children: 2

Mayme O'Connor Schweble (Note: Some sources spell her first name as Maym.) (August 5, 1874 – January 25, 1943) was an American prospector and politician who served in the Nevada Assembly from 1924 until 1926. A member of the Republican Party, she represented Nye County in the legislature. Schweble was a well-respected gold miner in Nevada, and operated a large mining property together with her husband and sons. She was also a prominent politician, quickly rising to become a leader in local Republican organizations, particularly in women's groups.

== Biography ==
=== Early life ===
Mayme Schweble was born on August 5, 1874, in Weston, Missouri. She moved to the mining town of Tonopah, Nevada, prior to 1910, becoming one of the town's first female settlers. On September 10, 1908, she married gold miner John Henry Schweble. (Note: She had been previously married, though sources do not state when, how that marriage ended, or what her first husband's name was. Prior to her marriage to John Schweble, she used the surname Sullivan, though it is unclear if this was her maiden name or her first husband's surname.) Her husband was a native of Houghton, Michigan, moving to Nevada in 1902 to work in the mines; at the time of their marriage he was a mining superintendent of the Rawhide Daisy mine and made a fortune trawling in the town of Goldfield, becoming one of Nevada's most prominent miners. The couple were married in a small ceremony at the Congregational church in Reno, and settled in the town of Rawhide, though at some point they moved back to Tonopah.

=== Career ===
Since first arriving in Nevada, Schweble had been active in local Republican Party politics, despite the fact that women could not vote in the state until 1914. In 1916, women were allowed to attend and participate in the state party conventions. Schweble, who was a founding member of the executive committee of the Nye County Republican Women's Committee and chairwoman of the Tonopah Republican Women's Club, was elected as one of Nye County's delegates to the 1916 Republican state convention. Schweble played a significant role at the convention, serving as one of the key supporters for Republican candidate Samuel Platt, the former speaker of the Nevada Assembly, who was running against incumbent Democratic senator Key Pittman in the 1916 United States Senate election. She also gave the nominating speech for the re-election bid of U.S. representative Edwin E. Roberts.

Following the American entry into World War I, the couple briefly left Nevada, moving to Wharton, New Jersey, where her husband became employed with the Wharton Steel Company. They returned to Nevada in 1919. In 1923, they moved to the town of Ione, where her husband became the superintendent of the Shamrock Mining Company. The couple also operated an extensive mining property spanning the towns of Ione and Berlin. Due to "lingering illness[es]" developed by her husband during this period, Schweble largely ran the property herself. The property became quite successful, making her a "highly respected prospector", popular among even the "old time mining men". The local newspaper in Yerington described her as the most "outstanding woman prospector in Nevada". During interviews, Schweble highlighted her independence and skill, stating: "I can still handle a muck stick with the best of them. I've prospected all over Nevada, kicked all the rocks out of most of the old trails for the past 35 years". She also once stated that "the world needs gold and we have to live, so we are helping the men folks dig it".

Schweble was one of eight women who ran for the Nevada Assembly in the 1924 election, and one of four who were elected; with the election of Schweble and Florence B. Swasey, half of Nye County's four representatives in the assembly were women. Her campaign was aided by local schoolchildren, who assisted in distributing her campaign literature. Schweble became the first female prospector elected to the legislature. Serving in the 1925 regular session, she was a member of four legislative committees: Mines and Mining; Corporations and Railroads; State Institutions; and Claims, serving as chairman of the latter. Schweble was "a good friend" of prominent Nevada financier George Wingfield, and was seen as an ally of his in the assembly. (Note: Ironically, Wingfield was strongly anti-suffrage in the 1910s, once stating that he would leave Nevada if women were granted the right to vote.) As a result, she was considered a potential surrogate for Wingfield, able to propose his preferred legislation. In 1925, she voted against a bill which would have legalized all gambling in Nevada. Schweble left office at the end of her term in November 1926.

=== Later life and death ===
In April 1930, John Schweble fell severely ill; he was taken to the hospital in Fallon, where he died a week later. Despite her husband's death, Schweble continued to run the mining property with her two sons. She also remained politically active, serving as one of Nye County's delegates to the 1940 Republican state convention. At some point around this period, she moved to the town of Austin. Schweble died on January 25, 1943, while visiting her sister in San Francisco, California, aged 68. She was buried in the Churchill County Cemetery in Fallon. Schweble was a member of the local branches of the Order of the Eastern Star and the Odd Fellows.
