= Riss Lake =

Reservoir in Missouri, U.S.

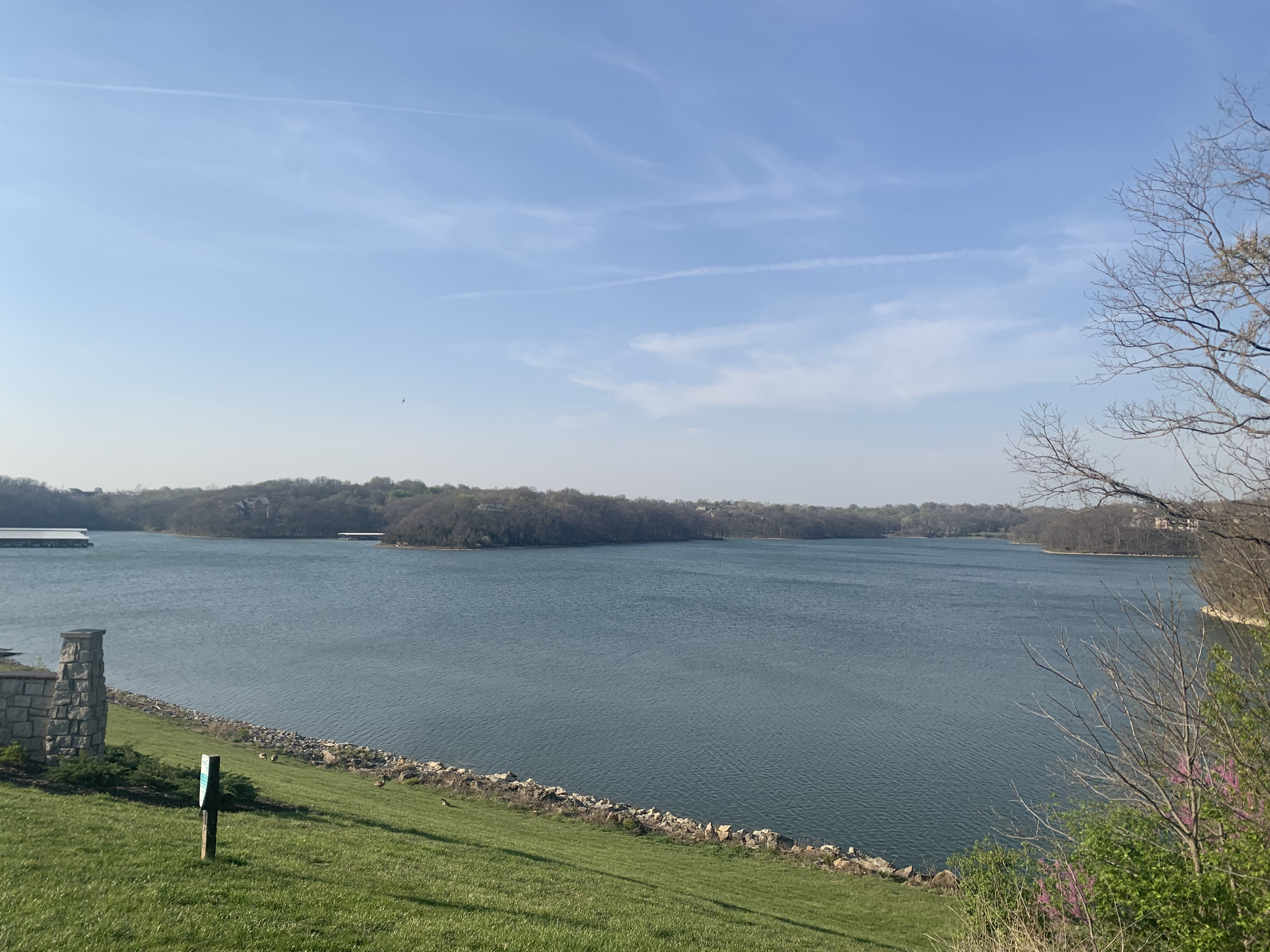
- View of Riss Lake from south

- Location within Missouri Location within the United States
- Location: Parkville, Platte County, Missouri
- Coordinates: 39°11′58″N 094°40′38″W
- Type: reservoir
- Basin countries: United States
- Surface elevation: 873 ft (266 m)

Riss Lake is a small reservoir in the center of the neighborhood Riss Lake, in Parkville, Platte County, Missouri. Forests surround it, and it is bordered on one side by a highway, two sides by the neighborhood Riss Lake and on the last side by the Parkville Nature Reservation. The neighborhood Riss Lake has several pools, a park, a basketball court, a volleyball court and tennis courts. The lake was originally much smaller until a dam was built. White Aloe Branch, also known as White Branch, flows southwest about one mile before entering the reservoir, and also travels another mile southward through Parkville before reaching the Missouri River.
