= George S. Park =

American politician (1811–1890)

George Shepherd Park (October 28, 1811 – June 6, 1890) was a Texas War of Independence hero and founder of Parkville, Missouri, Park University, and Manhattan, Kansas. He helped establish Kansas State University.

== Biography ==
Park was born in Grafton, Vermont.

In 1835, he served under James Fannin in the Texas War of Independence. Park joined with Fannin's men at Refugio, Texas. More than 400 of Fannin's troops were killed by troops of Antonio López de Santa Anna in the Goliad Massacre and Park was one of the few survivors.

In 1836, Park moved to Jackson County, Missouri, where he taught school. Following the Platte Purchase, in which Native Americans sold what became northwest Missouri in 1838, Park took on a 99-year-lease on a steamboat landing site, English Landing. There, he built a home on the bluffs above the Missouri River and platted the town of Parkville in 1844.

In 1845, he organized the Parkville Presbyterian Church. In 1853, he started the Industrial Luminary, a newspaper some believed to abolitionist. He owned slaves and termed the newspaper pro-commerce. He generally believed that slavery in Kansas would be bad for business there.

In 1854, while leading a trip up the Kansas River, Park established the town of Polistra near the mouth of the Big Blue River.

Park's newspaper was raided by a pro-slavery mob on April 14, 1855, and his printing press was thrown in the Missouri River. He was in Polistra at the time closing a deal to turn over the town into a newly named Boston, Kansas. Boston was to be run by members of abolitionist New England Emigrant Aid Company, who renamed it Manhattan. The Parkville Luminary, a newspaper based on the original Industrial Luminary, began publishing again in 2004. The newspaper's first issue contained unpublished letters from Park's last issue and frequently reprints his own editorials from the original.

Immediately after the mob raid, Park moved to Magnolia, Illinois, where he made a fortune in real estate, and he returned to Parkville in late 1855.

In 1858, Park pledged US$500 (equivalent to $19,000 in 2025) toward establishing Bluemont Central College in the newly named Manhattan. This became Kansas State University.

In 1859, Park promoted a railroad proposal from Cameron, Missouri to Parkville, to be called the Parkville and Grand River Railroad. It was planned to cross the Missouri River at Parkville. However, in 1869, Kansas City won the race for the first bridge across the river at the Hannibal Bridge which transformed it into the dominant city in the region.

Park was elected to the Missouri State Senate in 1866, where he introduced a bill to establish an industrial college. The bill failed.

Park formally moved back to Magnolia in 1874. He donated part of his land on the bluffs for a college to be headed by John A. McAfee, then president of Highland College in Highland, Kansas. The school founded in 1875, which became Park College, was initially aimed at preparing students for missionary life for the Presbyterian Church. Among the training was students building the school structures including its landmark MacKay Hall.
