= Benjamin Banneker School =

- U.S. National Register of Historic Places
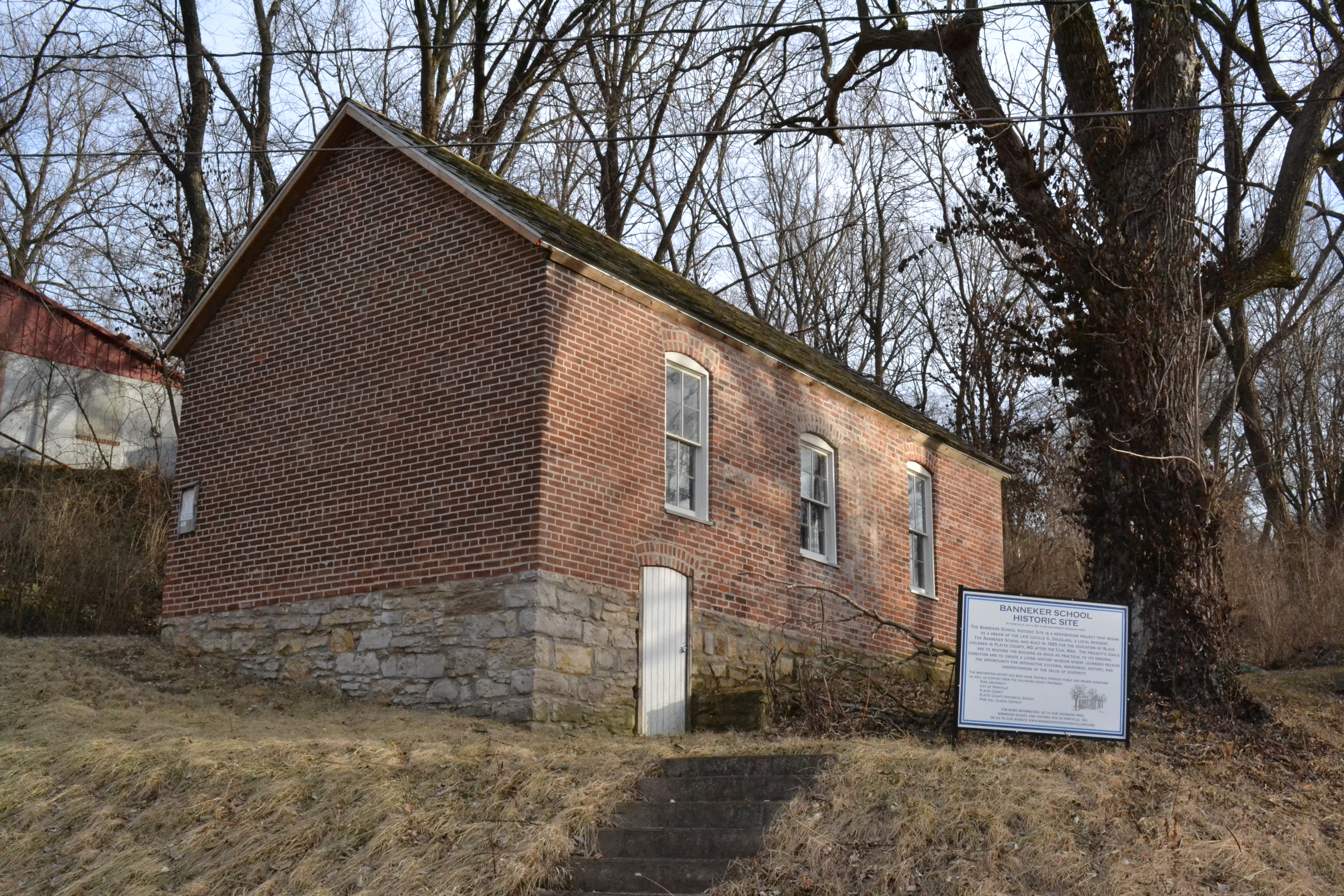

- Location within Missouri Location within the United States
- Location: 31 West Eighth Street, Parkville, Missouri, U.S.
- Coordinates: 39°11′34″N 94°41′6″W
- Area: less than one acre
- Built: 1885
- NRHP reference No.: 95001115
- Added to NRHP: September 22, 1995

Benjamin Banneker School is a historic one-room school building located at Parkville, in Platte County, Missouri. It was listed on the National Register of Historic Places in 1995.

== History ==
The Benjamin Banneker School was built in 1885, and is a one-story, red brick building with gable roof. It measures approximately 34 feet (10 m) by 18 feet (5.5 m) and sits on a rubble limestone foundation with basement. It served as the primary school for African-American students until about c. 1902, when a new school was constructed.

It has been converted to a private residence.
