= Washington Chapel C.M.E. Church =

Historic church in Missouri, United States

- U.S. National Register of Historic Places
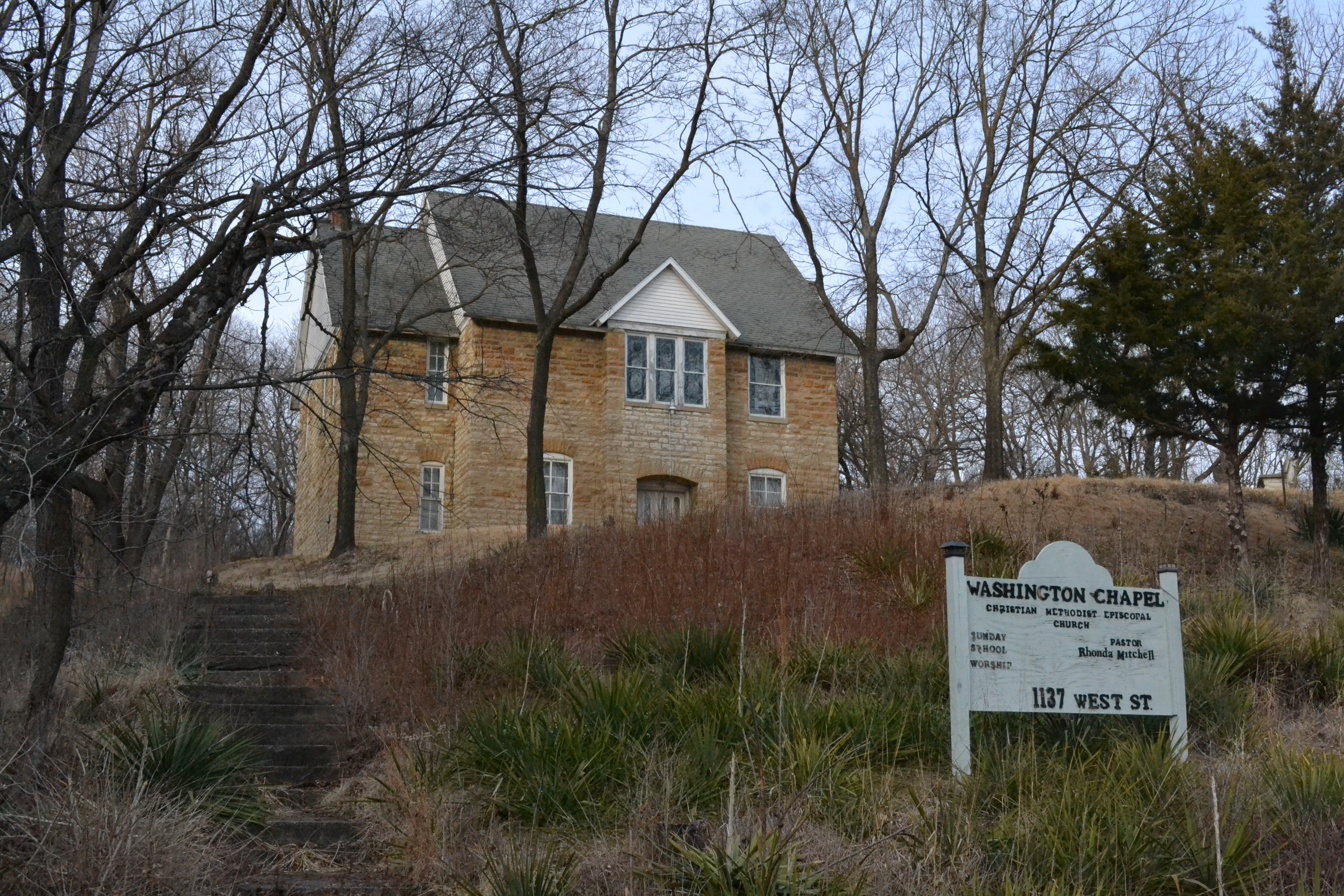

- Location within Missouri Location within the United States
- Location: 1137 West St., Parkville, Missouri
- Coordinates: 39°11′42″N 94°41′9″W
- Area: less than one acre
- Built: 1907
- Architect: Breen, Charles Patrick
- Architectural style: Late Gothic Revival
- NRHP reference No.: 92001055
- Added to NRHP: August 31, 1992

Washington Chapel C.M.E. Church is a historic Christian Methodist Episcopal church located at 1137 West Street in Parkville, Platte County, Missouri. It was built in 1907, and is a two-story, rectangular, Late Gothic Revival style native limestone building. It has a gable roof and features a castellated corner tower and projecting bays.

It was listed on the National Register of Historic Places in 1992.

== History ==
After the Platte Purchase Treaty was ratified, White settlers and the people they enslaved began to arrive in Platte County, Missouri, which includes to Parkville. In conditions and values that mirrored the South, these African Americans grew and harvested labor-intensive hemp, which fostered a rapid economic and population increase. By 1860, Blacks comprised nearly one-quarter of Platte County's population.

At the time, enslaved people were not allowed to assemble, not even for religious reason, and only in extremely rare cases were they allowed to become full members of White churches. Before the Civil War, Platte, Clay, and Jackson Counties, had “slave balconies” in their churches where Black worshippers sat, or they were relegated to a segregated section of pews (Fuenfhausen, 2023). If these options weren’t available, African American worshipped in their own manner in cabins or outdoors, served by both local and itinerant Black ministers.

However, before the end of slavery, free African Americans in the North began to create religious institutions separate from their White counterparts. In the late 1700s, Richard Alien formed the Free African Society in Philadelphia, which led to the regional spread of the African Methodist Episcopal Church. In 1844, a split occurred in the Methodist Church over slavery. In the South, enslaved people usually worshiped in the churches of their masters (Powers, 2023), but in the North, they were allowed to organize their own congregations (Fraser 1954), where they found an independence and respect that was not possible in White churches.

Black churches were one of the few means that Blacks had to express themselves; religion became the heart of their community, hosting a variety of social activities (Frazier, 1964; Missouri State Parks website).

At first, Blacks preaching to a gather African American congregation was greeted with a fear and suspicion. To do so was often a crime. Typical of the situation was an account from the early history of Platte County describing two Black ministers who were caught preaching in 1854. “Charles, a slave of Almond Paxton, and Callahan and Andy, enslaved men held by L. C. Jack, were convicted and fined for expounding on the gospel to their fellows with no officer present on Atchison Hill” (in Platte City near the old “Catholic Cemetery” on Atchison Hill). Charles and Andy (Paxton, 1897, p. 187).

After the Civil War, the small African American membership of the Methodist Episcopal Church South was permitted to organize into a separate church. In Jackson, Tennessee, in 1870, they formed the Colored Methodist Episcopal Church (today called the Christian Methodist Episcopal, or C.M.E, Church; (Fraser 1954; Douglass, 1994). The Colored Methodist Episcopal Church held its first conference in the summer, 1870. Reverend Arch Brown and his cousin, Steven Carter, traveled by horse-drawn wagon from Leavenworth, Kansas to Jackson, Tennessee to attend. It took them months to make the long, arduous trip. Representing a “colored church” in Parkville organized by Moses White, a Black man, of Leavenworth, Brown and Carter returned home to give the Black church an affiliation. The Parkville church was said to be the second Colored Methodist Episcopal Church in Missouri.

From 1870 to 1877, George Park allowed his housekeeper, Angeline Rucker (who he had purchased when she was nine years old and held until 1854 when she married Willy Washington of Weston, MO) and the other members of the newly named C.M.E. Church to hold services in the northeast corner of the basement of his hotel. The hotel was located near the tennis courts at English Landing (where today the Spirit Fountain is at 8701 River Park Drive).

In 1877, the C.M.E. congregation was moved to a brick structure on Main Street (Douglass, 1992; the No. 4 in Block 41 lot). The membership was growing rapidly, as reported in 1886 in the Park College Record (August 17, 1886). “For some time, the Colored people of town have been trying to raise means to erect a church, the present [space] having become too small and old for their use. This week they have purchased the ruins of the old [Park] College barn, and will use the timbers, which are very heavy and solid, in building their new house of worship. We trust their effort will be successful, and if persistence will bring about success, they will not fail.” As it turned out, however, it took more than persistence to begin building the church—as reported in the Platte Shopper News. “In spite of many local Black residents receiving employment at Park College, it is still difficult to raise the funds for construction.”

According to the oral history of Alcorama Douglass Spencer and Cora Douglass Thompson, the congregation was moved “because the White residents of Parkville wanted the Black people off of Main Street.” The Minutes of the College Board of Trustees of June 18, 1905, stated that, “On motion, H.B. McAfee was authorized to negotiate an exchange with the C.M.E. Church of Parkville, trading No. 4 in Block 41 lot, for a parcel of ground (i.e., 1137 West Street} near the Banneker School for Colored Children at the end of West Street (Howard B. McAfee, Park College's business manager and one of five sons of Dr. John A. McAfee, the founder and first president).

A Trust Agreement dated June 10, 1907, listed the purchase price for the property to be $1,866.40. The money was loaned to Washington Church by Park College, and paid back over the years (Standard atlas of Platte County, Missouri 1907). The traded lot on West Street (in the then segregated part of Parkville that residents called “The Hollow”) was four times as large as the former Church location at 10th and Main Streets. The land had originally been planned as an annex for an African American college, but the dream had not come to fruition.

Dr. Westcott, who is a history professor at Park University, did not think that the Church was moved off Main Street so that African Americans were not seen in the downtown area. “A sense of community was being formed by the Banneker School and the … C.M.E. Church, so moving to the general geographical location of these institutions and the general communal nature was not racial any more than Italians residing in ‘Little Italy’s’ or other ethnic groups living in ethnic ghettos” (Westcott in an email to Luetke; June, 2022).

At some point, the C.M.E. Church was named for Willy and Angeline Washington. Nearby, Mount Washington Baptist Church (West 11th Street and now a private home) was established by Willie's cousin, George Washington. It’s not clear exactly who was responsible for the design of Washington Chapel C.M.E. Church, but Howard McAfee seems to be been closely involved with the planning (Douglass, 1992). It building is a simpler style of the late Gothic Revival style (Whiffen, 1985 in Douglass, 1992), with windows that do not have the typical Gothic arch, and a with an impressive castellated tower that brings verticality in design and adds to the massive appearance of the building (Douglass, 1992). Native limestone was quarry from the Park College grounds, as well as the hill on which the Church sits.

On October 28, 1886, it was reported in the Parkville Independent that “the foundation for a Colored church in Parkville is partly in and the congregation is asking the people of Parkville to assist them in [financing the] the structure.” Douglass (1992) reported that there was considerable effort to raise funds for the church structure, ranging from special events held at Park College to member pledges. In May, 1905, Parkville citizens attended two public lectures in the McCormick Chapel (at Park College). “The worthy object of the lectures was aiding to raise funds to build a new Colored M.E. Church. We do not hesitate to say that the Colored community of Parkville is far above the average in sobriety, industry, thrift and intelligence. When Park College had reached such a degree of financial prosperity that it was possible to hire the help which is so largely necessary in work with teams . . . Colored help was the chief help obtainable” (Parkville Independent quoted by Westcott, 2022).

Construction of the Church was supervised by Charles “Pat” Patrick Breen, the Superintendent of Buildings at Park College. Working with student labor and men of the Church, he demonstrated both a talent for stonemasonry and the ability to educate students and men from the congregation (Charles P, Brennan vertical file cited in Douglass 1992). Breen stayed on as Superintendent of Construction at Park College until 1909, and was responsible for more than a dozen significant structures on campus, as well as for construction in the City of Parkville and surrounding towns (April 9, 1899, Park College Record in Douglass, 1992; Platte County Gazette, December 16, 1938). The quality of his craftsmanship was evidenced in the Washington Chapel Church, although the building is not typically mentioned as one of his projects (Douglass, 1992). Douglass attributed this to the racism of the period in which Breen lived. In 2007, the Washington Chapel building was described by Parkville Mayor Kathryn Dusenbery as a “beautiful landmark.”

Construction continued until 1905 (Platte Shopper News, October 17, 1984), and included a parsonage on 13th and Elm (where a yellow house stands today). Alcorama Douglass Spencer and Cora Douglass Thompson remember that it had a parlor with a good stove, two bedrooms, and no indoor plumping. Reverends Kneely, Johnson, Jenkins, and James Smith, the Pastor of Mount Washington Baptist Church, lived there with their families. Other pastors that served the Church are listed in a 2018 commemorative Church calendar, with the exception of Reverend Lewis who served in 2019 and 2020.

Dr. McAfee died before Washington Chapel C.M.E. Church became a reality. His son, Howard McAfee, arranged for a stained-glass window from the original Park College Chapel (that had burned down) to be installed in the Church in his memory. His father, Howard McAfee, had been a good friend to the congregation, dreaming of a separate college for them and assisting with the obtainment of campus jobs. Unfortunately, on January 21, 2023, vandals broke the John McAfee Memorial Window and stole the part of the glass that contained Dr. McAfee’s name. The piece was miraculously returned the morning of a “vigil of forgiveness” that was held in the Church yard. Over 2023 and 2024, funds were raised to replace it.

On October 4, 1906, the Platte County Gazette noted that “The new stone church for the C.M.E. congregation is rapidly nearly completion.” The congregation held its first service in the new Church on February 24, 1907. “It was seated with oak pews constructed by Mr. Thad Ashby,” who also worked on many of the homes in the segregated hollow. “They reflect good credit on him as a cabinet workman. The lower floor of the building will be used for festivals, public gatherings, and so forth. It is a large room with concrete floor and is well adapted to the purposes for which it is to be used … It is a good building and reflects credit on the congregation” (Platte County Gazette; October 4, 1906).

The Washington Chapel C. M.E. Church was dedicated on June 29, 1907, as engraved in the Church cornerstone.

Initially, the Church boasted eighty members, fifty-six of them pledging to give a tenth of their income to sustain it (Douglass, 1994). “In a year when most weekly tithes were around fifteen cents, one annual “rally” in 1913 raised almost $50.00” (Washington Chapel records and documents in Douglass, 1992).

Charter members of Washington Chapel C.M.E. Church included Andrew Jackson, Wade and Amanda Sanders, and Willy and Angeline Washington. Also, the Bolden and Nichols families. Surely, Steven Carter, who had made the trip to Tennessee to ask that the Church be recognized, was also a member. Lewis and Armenta Cave also were early members, joining about 1872 according to the Kansas–Missouri Annual Conference Record (September 1946, in Douglass, 1992). Their son, Spencer Taylor Cave (1862-1947), became a beloved employee of Park College, and has been honored in many ways. He was the Superintendent of Sunday School at the Church and responsible for helping others to obtain employment at Park College.

Leaders of the Church were also members of the leading African American families in Parksville (Douglass, 1992). Among the names of these important people were Carter, Cave, Bolden, Brown, Jackson, Martin, Nichols, Pearl, Rogers, and Woods. The Reverends Yates and Anderson played early important roles in both the Church and the integration history of Park College. While not allowed to register and receive credit for classes in which they were enrolled (including Lucille Sears Douglass), they were allowed to attend and completed course requirements as early as 1938 (Breckon, 1990).

Records indicate that payments were made over the years on the loan that Park College made to the Church (Westcott, 2022). On October 1951, the final transfer of ownership for the land building actually occurred and the College Board of Trustees conveyed the property to the Washington Chapel Trustees of the colored Methodist Episcopal Church (Douglass, 1992).

Additional stained-glass windows were installed in 1953. They have the following dedications: the east window in the tower, "Community Youth Club"; on the north elevation, from east to west - "Mrs. Lucy Frazier" - "Charter Members Mrs. William Washington, Mr. & Mrs. Wade Saunders, Andrew Jackson", "First Stewards Louis Nichols, Richard Rogers, Spencer Cave, Robert Carter, Otis Washington, Charlie Brown", "First Trustees George Bolden, Ruben Martin, Alien Little, Arch Brown, Richard Rogers", "Bishops W.H. Miles, Joseph Beebe, I. Lane, N.C. Cleaves, M.F. Jamison, J.A. Hamlett" - "in Memoriam George and Kate Bolden" - "Rev. & Mrs. R.A. Simpson"; on the west elevation, from north to south - "In Memory of Alfred & Sarah Johnson by Pansey Stephens & Pearl Mosley" - "In Memory of Vivian Cave Johnson" - "In Memory of Marian E. Brown"; and on the south facade, the grouping of three windows contains a dedication in the center "In Memory of Leonard Clayton 33 Yrs. Steward", which is flanked by "Willing Workers" on the left, and "Morning Glories" on the right (Douglass, 1992).

Washington Chapel C. M. E. Church and Community Use Building was, and is today, the spiritual, social, and visual focal point of Parkville’s African American community. Denied participation in a city that equaled that of the White residents, the Church provided leadership opportunities that included the Trustees, Steward, and the Stewardess Boards, the Choir, the Sunday School, the Missionary Society, the War Mothers and Wives, the Usher Board, the Young People’s Choir, and the Junior Stewards (Douglass, 1992). Vacation Bible School and the Family Institute were held throughout the 1950s and 60s. Many people living in the area today remember attending the annual Easter Breakfast that began during the Depression and the annual Thanksgiving dinner. These events, as well as fish fries, pancake breakfasts, and the Homecoming Bazaar helped to meet Church expenses. Shan Chi Chek’s grandson was a guest speaker at the Church on several occasions and Alex Haley, acclaimed author of the novel Roots, visited the church in the 1960s, 1977, and 1986 (Graham, 1992; Cora Thompson). Lucille S. Douglass helped to organize annual celebrations for Martin Luther King’s birthday. Foreign students from Park College, especially the Japanese students, often joined the worship. A veterans’ recognition service was held, and the honoring of those who serve in the military is an important aspect of the Church today. As a result of these many activities, the Church left its imprint on everyone in the Parkville community .

After World War II, African American service members routinely moved to large cities instead of small towns or rural locations, leaving Black churches with declining memberships (Powers, 2023); This was somewhat the case in Parkville when many Black families migrated to Kansas City and other urban centers, seeking relief from the discrimination and segregation of Parkville, MO.

In 1992, Lucille Sears Douglass, with assistance from the Daughters of the American Revolution, to complete the application to the National Register of Historic Places (without which this article couldn’t have been written). The detailed work is available on the Internet.

In recent years, the remaining few, elderly members of Washington Chapel C. M. E. Church have stayed active. In the early 1990s, a description of the Church was posted to Wikipedia. In that same year, an interior staircase was built so that people on the first floor did not have to go outside to enter the sanctuary on the second floor. Around 2019, Lucille H. Douglass (daughter of Frank and Lucille S. Douglass) created a Facebook page and continues as the administrator. Around this same time, the state of the building became such that members could not hold services and community events in it. Services ended completely before the Pandemic of 2020, and members drove to St. James C.M.E. Church in Leavenworth, KS to worship.

In 2023, Alcorama “Pearl” Douglass Spencer and Barbara Schell Luetke applied for a grant from the African American Cultural Heritage Action Fund, a program from the National Trust for Historic Preservation. Awarded to thirty-one applicants of 550 who applied was a $160,000 grant (of the $650,000 estimated to be needed) to Washington Chapel. A Washington Chapel Restoration Committee was formed of those working directly on the project. In 2024, the roof was replaced and three bathrooms remodeled to be handicapped accessible.

Because of the vision, dedication, and leadership of volunteer general contractor, Mike S., who served as general contractor, both floors of the interior of the building were demolished, beginning in February, 2024. The labor was largely supplied by a faithful, skilled group of volunteers, “the Thursday Crew,” who Church members found through a Kansas City organization, Friends of Sacred Structures (FOSS). This afforded volunteer electricians and a plumber, as well as six to eight workers men and women who worked on the Church for months. Friends of Sacred Structures (FOSS) assesses, assists and supports those trying to sustain buildings that had an original religious purpose. Most of the Thursday Crew had worked on the Church of the Resurrection (C.O.R.) construction team. FOSS donated $2,500 for electrical supplies.

When finished, the building will be available to the community, complete with a kitchen, community room, and classroom for meetings and educational purposes. There will be Wifi and Zoom-type conferencing as well.
