= Mackay Building =

- U.S. National Register of Historic Places
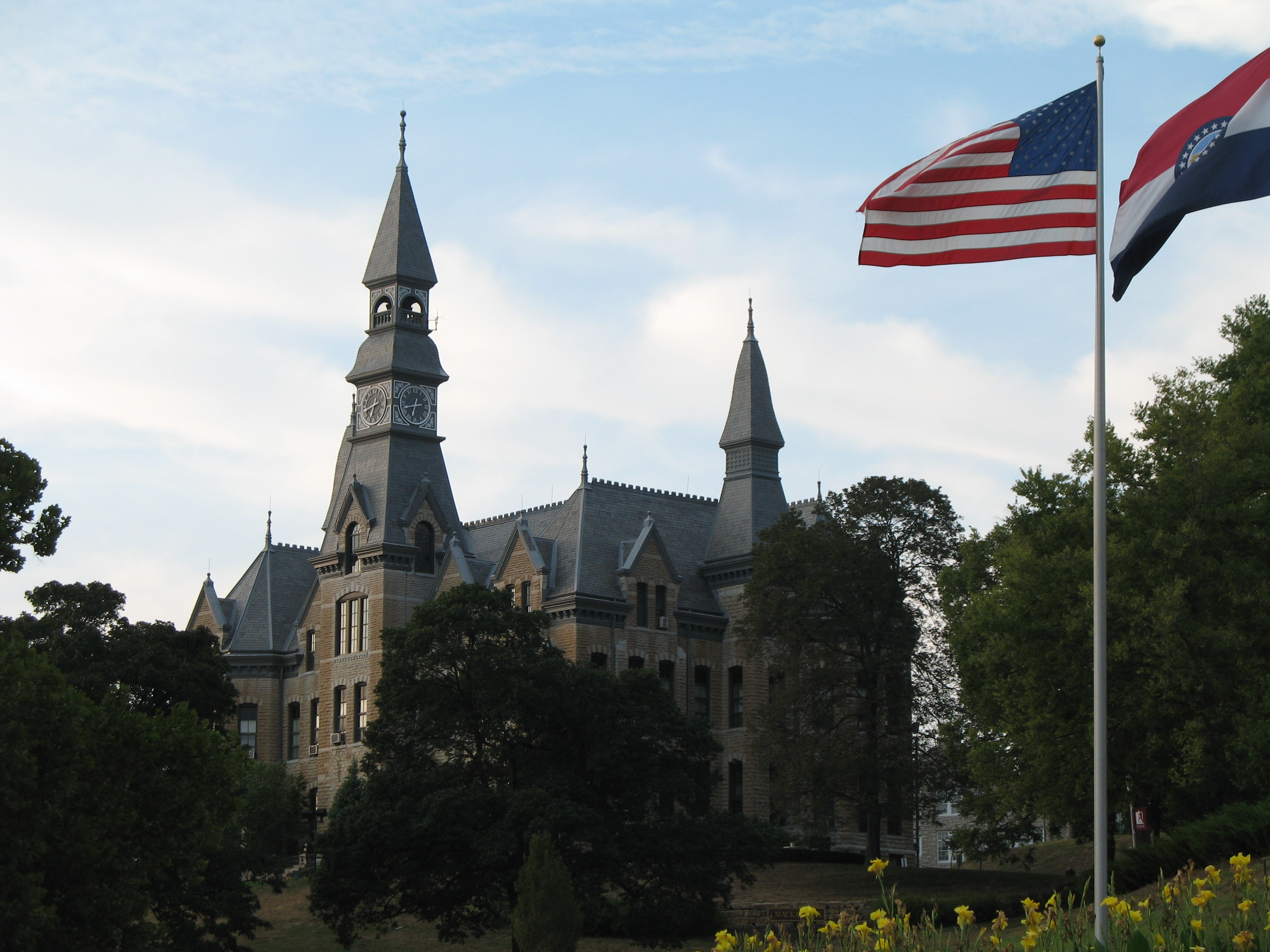
- Mackay Building, September 2007

- Location within Missouri Location within the United States
- Location: Park College, Parkville, Missouri
- Coordinates: 39°11′24″N 94°40′48″W
- Area: less than one acre
- Built: 1886
- Built by: Hogg, James Oliver
- Architect: Breen, Patrick
- NRHP reference No.: 79001389
- Added to NRHP: April 6, 1979

Mackay Building, also known as Mackay Hall, is a historic building located on the campus of Park University at Parkville, Platte County, Missouri. It was built in 1886, and is a three-story, rock-faced limestone structure with Richardsonian Romanesque, High Victorian Gothic, and Chateauesque style design elements. It measures approximately 137 feet by 84 feet. It features a clock tower with tall spire rising in stages from a semi-detached central block, textured wall surfaces, complex roofs and towers, wall dormers, asymmetrical bays, and polychromatic color scheme.

It was listed on the National Register of Historic Places in 1979.
