= Deister Archeological Site =

- U.S. National Register of Historic Places
- Nearest city: Kansas City, Missouri
- Area: 9.9 acres (4.0 ha)
- NRHP reference No.: 70000347
- Added to NRHP: January 21, 1970

Deister Archeological Site (23PL2) is a prehistoric archaeological site located at Kansas City, Platte County, Missouri. It is a terrace level village site situated along Line Creek. The pottery and stone tools from the site belong to the technological/artistic tradition that is described as "Hopewell tradition."

It was listed on the National Register of Historic Places in 1970.
