= Missouri District Warehouse =

- U.S. National Register of Historic Places
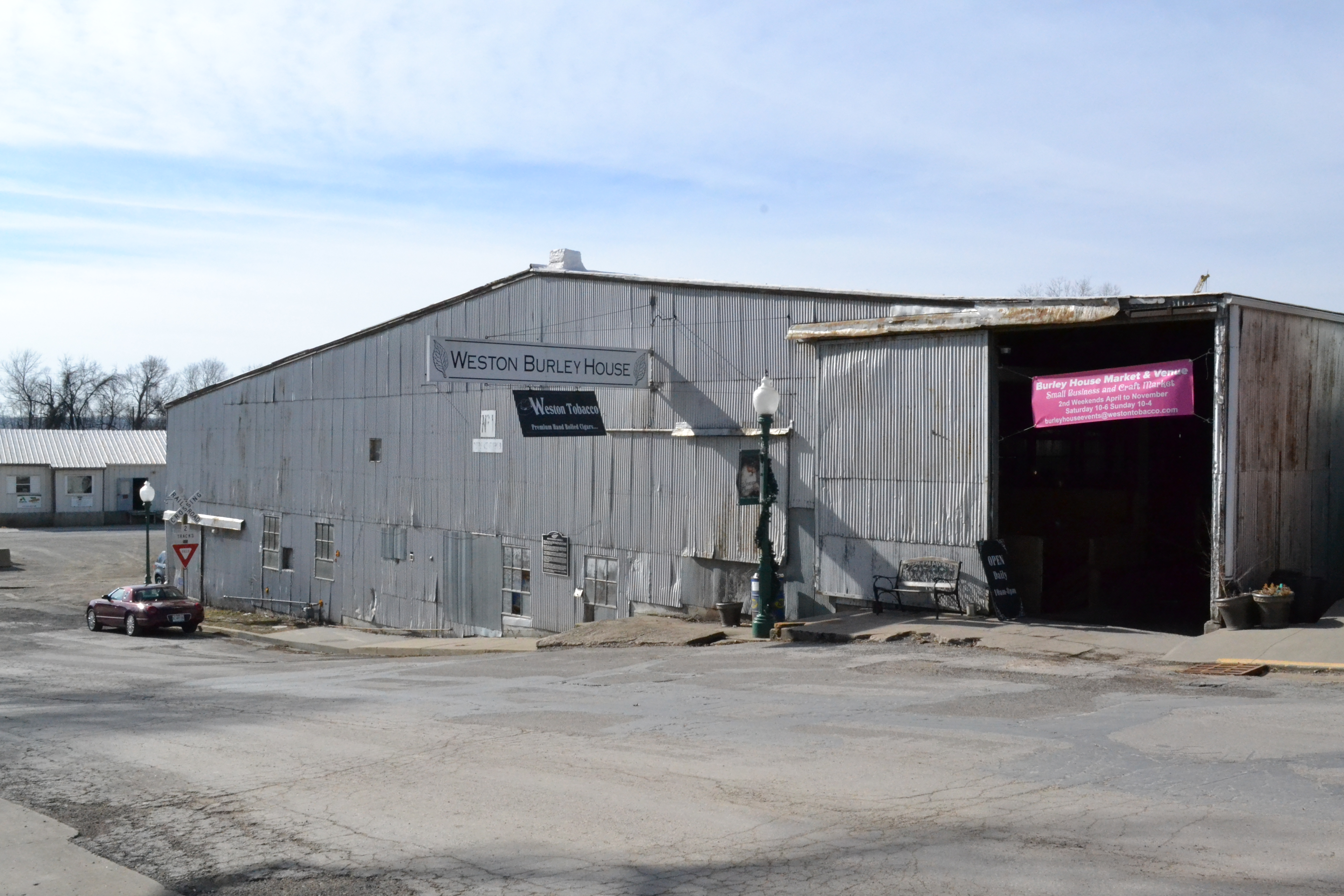

- Location within Missouri Location within the United States
- Location: 357 Main St., Weston, Missouri
- Coordinates: 39.410160°N 94.902832°W
- Area: 131.2 acres (53.1 ha)
- NRHP reference No.: 10000476
- Added to NRHP: July 19, 2010

Missouri District Warehouse, also known as the Weston Tobacco Warehouse and Weston Burley House No. 1, is a historic warehouse located at Weston, Platte County, Missouri, United States. It was built in 1937, and is a sprawling, two-story, rectangular, steel-frame building sheathed with corrugated metal. It measures 125 feet by 300 feet. It was built as a loose-leaf tobacco auction warehouse and curing barn.

It was listed on the National Register of Historic Places in 2010.
