= Park University =

Private university in Parkville, Missouri, US

- Former name: Park College (1875–2000)
- Motto: Fides et Labor
- Motto in English: Faith & Work
- Type: Private university
- Established: 1875; 151 years ago
- Endowment: $87.7 million (2025)
- President: Kathrine Swanson
- Provost: Emily Sallee
- Students: 4,949 (fall 2025)
- Undergraduates: 3,995 (fall 2025)
- Postgraduates: 954 (fall 2025)
- Location: Parkville, Missouri, U.S. 39°11′24″N 94°40′48″W
- Colors: Canary and Wine
- Nicknames: Pirates (Parkville), Buccaneers (Gilbert)
- Sporting affiliations: NAIA – HAAC (Parkville); NAIA – GSAC (Gilbert)
- Website: www.park.edu

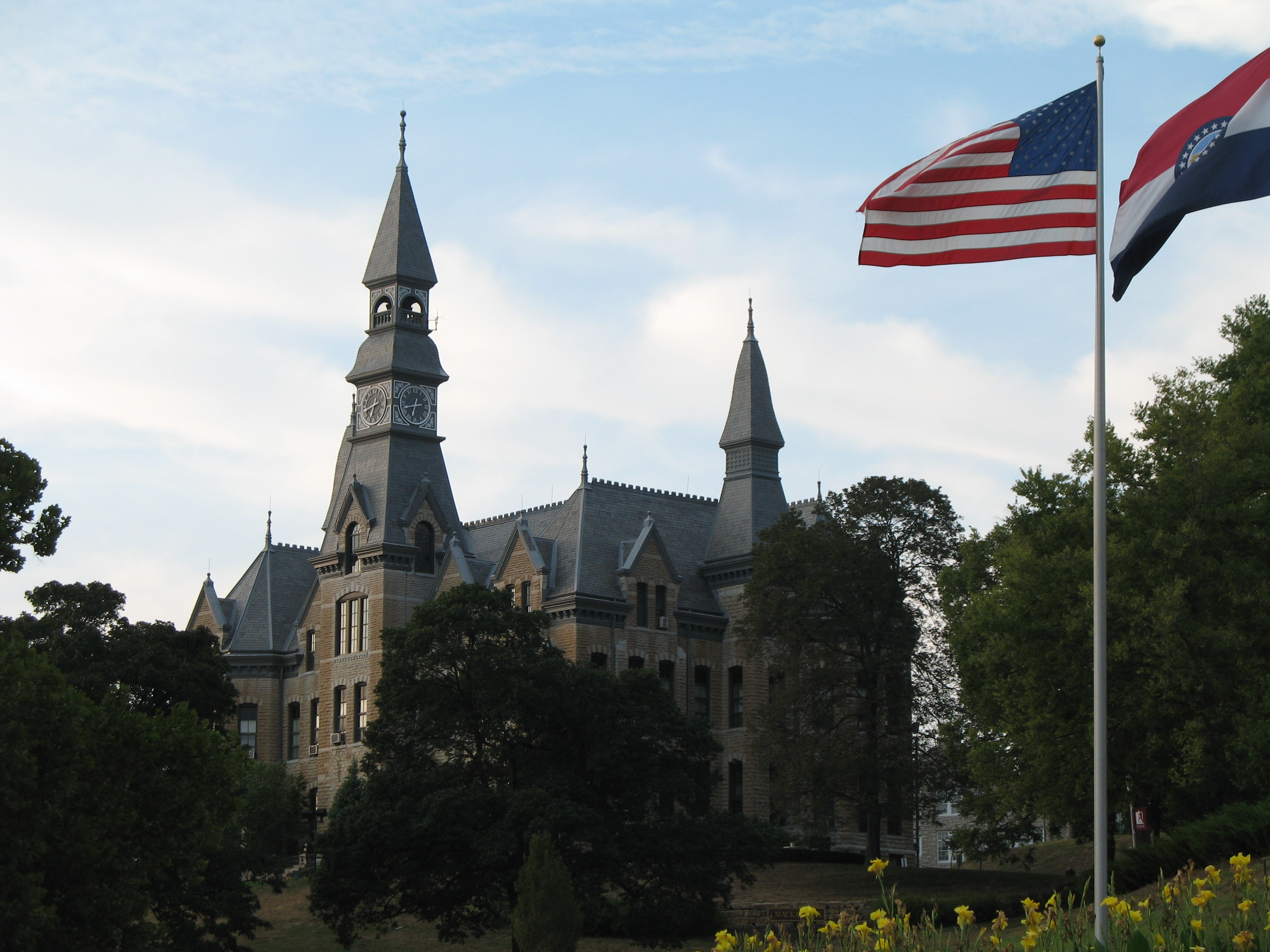
Mackay Hall

Park University is a private university in Parkville, Missouri, United States. It was founded in 1875. In the fall of 2025, Park had an enrollment of 4,949 students.

== History ==
The school was originally called Park College for Training Christian Workers at its founding in 1875, then shortened to Park College in 1879. It was founded by John A. McAfee on land donated by George S. Park with its initial structure being the stone hotel Park owned on the bluff above the Missouri River.

The original concept called for students to receive free tuition and board in exchange for working up to half day in the college's farm, electrical shop or printing plant. According to the terms of the arrangement if the "Parkville Experiment" did not work out within five years, the college grounds were to revert to Park.

There were 17 students in the first school year and in the first graduation class there were five women. McAfee led until his death in 1890. His son Lowell M. McAfee became the second president of Park until stepping down in 1913. The first international student at Park University arrived in 1880 from Japan.

The defining landmark of the campus is Mackay Hall, named after Carroll County, Illinois banker Duncan Mackay who donated $25,000 in materials for the structure shortly before his death. The building was constructed using limestone mined on the campus grounds and built with the labor of students. Construction began in 1883 and was finished by 1893. Mackay Hall is the main focal point of the campus and dominates the hillside, overlooking the town of Parkville. It is on the National Register of Historic Places.

The school was originally affiliated with the Presbyterians, but in 1975, following a financial crisis, Park was officially linked to Graceland University and established ties with the Reorganized Church of Jesus Christ of Latter Day Saints (now the Community of Christ), transitioning its affiliation to the RLDS church in 1979. At least since 2001, the university has not reported any religious affiliation.

The college has had a relationship with the military since 1889. However, the relationship was greatly expanded in the late 1960s with the establishment of a Military Degree Completion Program and later in 1972 with the Military Resident Center System. Park's total enrollment has grown from its small base since 1996 when it first began offering online courses. In 2000, it was renamed Park University.

== Locations ==
=== Parkville campus ===
The flagship campus of Park University is in the city of Parkville, Missouri. The Park University Graduate School is in downtown Kansas City. There are 41 campuses in 22 U.S. states including four campuses in the Kansas City area (downtown Kansas City, Independence, Lenexa, and Parkville) and a campus center in Austin, Texas. Most of the satellite campuses are on or near United States military bases and share quarters with other businesses/organizations.

=== Gilbert campus ===
In 2018, the university opened a campus center in Gilbert, Arizona, in the city's Heritage District. Park leased 11,000 square feet (1,000 m^{2}) at the University Building. The university continued to expand the Gilbert campus in 2019, leasing an additional 7,000 square feet (650 m^{2}) and extending the initial three-year term with the city to five years. The university continued to expand the Gilbert campus with the addition of college athletics. Initially playing as an independent during the 2019–20 academic year, the university announced membership in the NAIA and California Pacific Conference (Pac West) starting in 2020–21.

== Rankings ==
- Ranked second in the “online and nontraditional” category on the Military Times’ "Best for Vets: Colleges 2016" list.
- Ranked second among all private colleges/universities in the country with a 9.5 percent annual ROI by 2015 PayScale College ROI Report.
- 2015-16 Colleges of Distinction list.
- Ranked by U.S. News & World Report as the 126-165 best Midwest college in 2018.

== Athletics ==
=== Park Pirates ===
The athletic teams of the Park University main campus are called the Pirates. The university is a member of the National Association of Intercollegiate Athletics (NAIA), primarily competing in the Heart of America Athletic Conference (HAAC) since the 2020–21 academic year. The Pirates previously competed in the American Midwest Conference (AMC) from 2009–10 to 2019–20; which they were a member on a previous stint from 1986–87 to 1993–94; and in the defunct Midlands Collegiate Athletic Conference (MCAC) from 1994–95 to 2008–09.

Park competes in 18 intercollegiate varsity sports: Men's sports include baseball, basketball, cross country, golf, soccer, track & field (indoor and outdoor) and volleyball; while women's sports include basketball, cross country, golf, soccer, softball, track & field (indoor and outdoor) and volleyball; and co-ed sports include eSports.

The Department of Athletics at Park University was led by Claude English, Director of Athletics, who was also the Pirates’ men's basketball coach from 1992 to 2005 and retired in 2021. From 1980 to 1984, English was the head men's basketball coach at his alma mater, the University of Rhode Island, and he played one season in the NBA with the Portland Trail Blazers in 1970–1971.

Seven former Park Pirates competed for the Kansas City Comets of the Major Arena Soccer League as of 2020.

==== Championships ====
- 2026 Men's Volleyball (NAIA National Championship)
- 2018 Women's Volleyball (NAIA National Champions)
- 2017 Men's Volleyball (NAIA Invitational Tournament)
- 2014 Women's Volleyball (NAIA National Champions)
- 2014 Men's Volleyball (NAIA Invitational Tournament)
- 2012 Men's Volleyball (NAIA Invitational Tournament)
- 2008 Men's Volleyball (NAIA Invitational Tournament)
- 2003 Men's Volleyball (NAIA Invitational Tournament)

=== Park–Gilbert Buccaneers ===
The athletic teams of the Gilbert campus of Park University (Park–Gilbert) are called the Buccaneers. The university added a college athletics program to the Gilbert campus center in 2019. After playing as independent institution during the 2019–20 academic year, the university announced membership in the National Association of Intercollegiate Athletics (NAIA), primarily competing in the California Pacific Conference (Cal Pac) starting in the 2020–21 academic year.

Park–Gilbert competes in 15 intercollegiate varsity sports: Men's sports include baseball, basketball, cross country, golf, soccer, track & field (indoor and outdoor) and volleyball; while women's sports include basketball, beach volleyball, cross country, golf, soccer, softball, track & field (indoor and outdoor) and volleyball.

== Notable people ==
- Behzod Abduraimov, pianist
- Marsia Alexander-Clarke, artist
- Sebastian James (singer) (2018) - rock musician and former drummer for Nigel Dupree Band
- Vlatko Andonovski (2008) - professional soccer coach
- James J. Barry Jr. (1969) - former New Jersey General Assemblyman and New Jersey Director of Consumer Affairs
- Ralph von Frese (1969) - American geologist
- Tsiang Tingfu (Chinese: 蔣廷黻)- Chinese scholar and diplomat. In 1911, he attended the Park Academy
- Don H. Compier (1985) - founding Dean of the Community of Christ Seminary
- Helena Conley - Wyandot activist
- Steve Cox (1988) - freelance writer
- John R. Everett (1942) - President of Hollins College, first Chancellor of the Municipal College System of the City of New York, and President of the New School for Social Research
- Maurice Green Olympic Sprinter; world record holder
- Melana Scantlin (2002) - former Miss Missouri USA, television personality
- Chance Browne - American musician, painter, and cartoonist
- Robert E. Hall - eleventh Sergeant Major of the Army
- Charles A. Holland, Los Angeles, California, City Council member, 1929–31
- James A. Roy - sixteenth Chief Master Sergeant of the Air Force
- Edwin Kagin - attorney, founder Camp Quest
- George Kelly - American psychologist, therapist and educator
- Texe Marrs - American preacher
- Cleland Boyd McAfee (1884) - American theologian
- Newell A. George - United States Congressman, 1959–1961.
- Carl McIntire - radio broadcaster
- Stephen M. Veazey - Prophet-President of the Community of Christ
- George S. Robb, U.S. Army (1912) - Medal of Honor - World War I
- Lewis Millet, U.S. Army (1964) - Medal of Honor - Korea
- Thaddeus J. Martin, U.S. Air Force, Connecticut Adjutant General
- David Grace (basketball) UCLA and Oregon State University men's assistant basketball coach (USAF Retired)
- Anthony Melchiorri - Hospitality expert and Travel Channel host
- Hollington Tong (Chinese: 董顯光) - transferred to University of Missouri, Republic of China ambassador to the United States
- Jan Zimmerman - police chief and chair of the Missouri Gaming Commission

=== Faculty and staff ===
- Stanislav Ioudenitch (Professor of Music and Piano) - Pianist and gold medalist of Van Cliburn International Piano Competition in 2001
- Kay Barnes (Senior Director for University Engagement) - Former mayor of Kansas City and candidate for Congress in 2008
