= Frederick Krause Mansion =

Historic house in Missouri, United States

- U.S. National Register of Historic Places
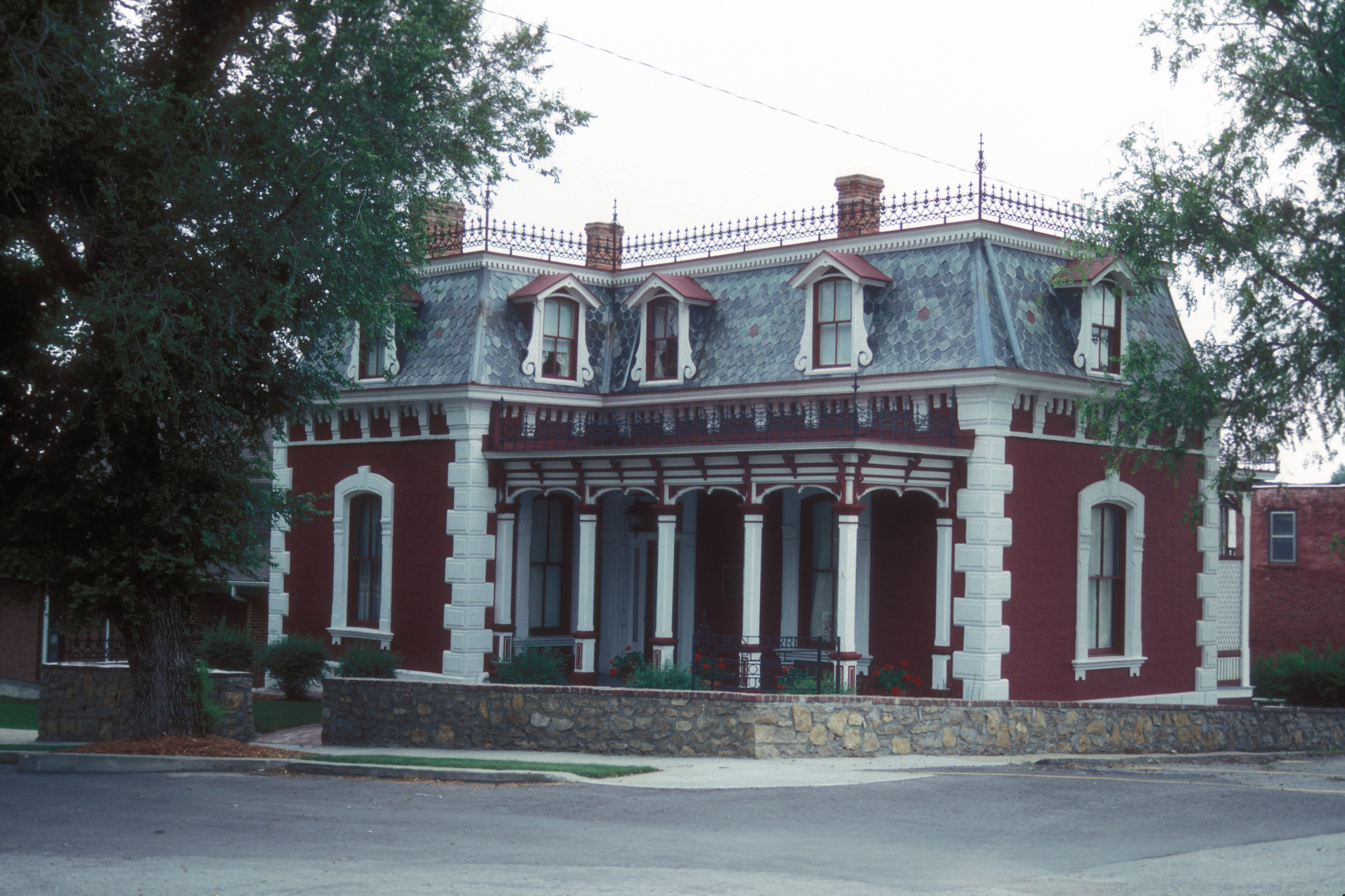
- Frederick Krause Mansion, January 2007

- Location within Missouri Location within the United States
- Location: 3rd and Ferrel St., Platte City, Missouri
- Coordinates: 39°22′9″N 94°46′51″W
- Area: less than one acre
- Built: 1883
- Architectural style: Second Empire
- NRHP reference No.: 78001672
- Added to NRHP: May 22, 1978

Frederick Krause Mini Mansion, also known as the Ben Ferrel Platte County Museum, is a historic mansion located at Platte City, Platte County, Missouri. It was built in 1882-1883 by Frederic Krause, an immigrant from Prussia. The mini mansion is a two-story, modified "T"-plan, Second Empire style red brick building with limestone corner quoins and foundation. It is topped by a mansard roof with gray-blue and rose hexagonal slate. The roof and porches are crested with ornamental cast iron work. The home is referred to as a 'mini' mansion because it shares several architectural features with the Missouri Governor's Mansion built in 1871 (to include the brick and limestone construction and mansard roof). An interior, bronze fireplace surround also represents similar design to the white marble one found in the Governor's Mansion in Jefferson City. The Krause mini mansion houses the Ben Ferrel Museum and genealogical and historical research room for the Platte County Historical Society known by the acronym PCHS. The Platte County Historical Society owns and operates the building which opened to the public in 1985. The museum's collection presents regional history with furnishings and items donated entirely from local families and dating mainly from the mid-1800s to 1920. The museum features exhibits and other special events related to local history and the mini mansion's history.

The Krause mini mansion was listed on the National Register of Historic Places in 1978.
