= McCormick Distilling Company =

Distillery in Missouri, U.S.

- McCormick Distillery
- U.S. National Register of Historic Places
- U.S. Historic district
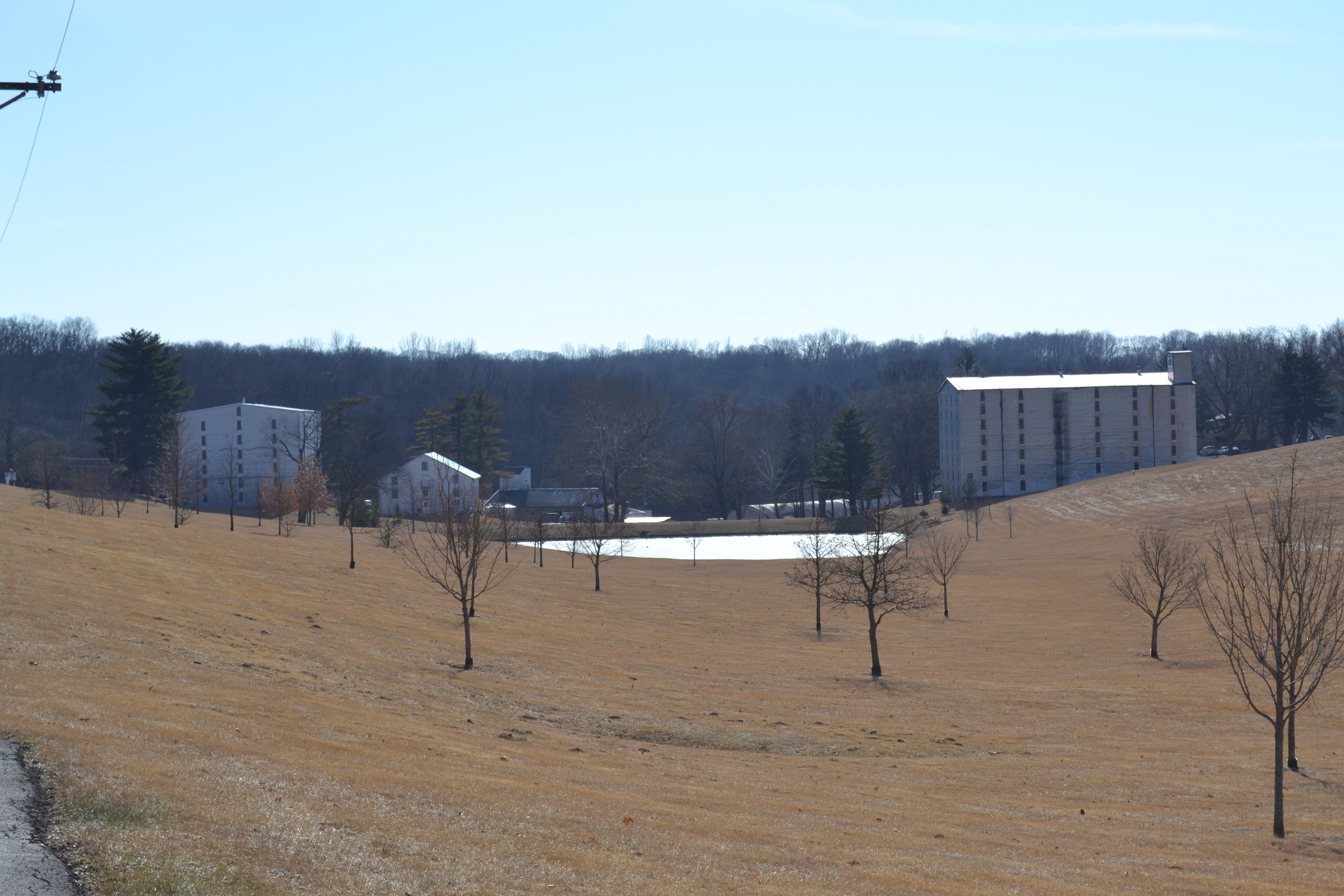

- Location within Missouri Location within the United States
- Location: MO JJ, Weston, Missouri
- Coordinates: 39°23′54″N 94°52′43″W
- Area: 9.9 acres (4.0 ha)
- Built: 1857
- NRHP reference No.: 74001090
- Added to NRHP: April 16, 1974

McCormick Distilling Company is a distillery and alcoholic beverage importing company in Weston, Missouri. Established by Ben Holladay in 1856, the distillery has been registered in the National Register of Historic Places and is the oldest distillery west of the Mississippi River that is still operating at its original location.

== History ==
The area for the distillery was chosen for the natural limestone springs that ran underground. After establishing the Holladay Distillery in 1856, Benjamin J. Holladay went on to great fame and fortune as the "Stagecoach King", running the stagecoach lines from Missouri to the West Coast that later became the Wells Fargo Express, and ultimately acquiring the Pony Express as well. He was a serial entrepreneur who owned saloons, hotels, and silver mines, and by 1864, he was the largest individual employer in the United States. In 1860, Holladay turned the distillery over to his brother, Major David Holladay, who then ran the distillery until his death in 1894. His son-in-law, Thomas Barton, operated the distillery until it was sold to George Shawhan and became the Shawhan Distillery in 1900. During the period of Prohibition in the United States, the company remained open by bottling its previously distilled whisky for medicinal purposes. The distillery was sold to Isadore Singer in 1936, and was renamed as the Old Weston Distillery. Singer then purchased the McCormick brand name from a neighboring plant at Waldron, Missouri, and renamed the distillery McCormick Distilling Company in 1942. In 1950, the company was purchased by Cloud Cray of Midwest Grain Products.

Business partners Ed Pechar and Mike Griesser purchased the company in 1992. Under Pechar and Griesser's ownership and management, McCormick Distilling expanded from 35 employees in 1992 to 186 employees in 2006. Griesser died in November, 2004. As of 2020, McCormick Distilling remains a privately held corporation owned by company chairman Ed Pechar, the estate of Mike Griesser, and a small group of employee partners who comprise the board of directors.

== Products ==
- McCormick Vodka: According to the company, McCormick Vodka is the #2 selling American vodka in the world. McCormick Vodka is also available in a variety of flavors including Apple, Watermelon, Raspberry, Grape, Sweet Tea, Blueberry, Cherry, Citrus, Orange and Peach.
- McCormick Gin
- McCormick Old Style Whiskey
- McCormick American Blended Whiskey
- McCormick Caribbean Rum
- McCormick Scotch
- Platte Valley Corn Whiskey
- Triple Crown Whiskey
- Holladay White Dog
- Ke-Ke Key Lime Cream Liqueur
- 360 Vodka - the world's first "eco-friendly" vodka that offers a classic 80 proof and a variety of flavored expressions including 360 Lime, 360 Huckleberry, 360 Watermelon, 360 Mango, 360 Red Raspberry, 360 Pineapple, 360 Red Delicious Apple, 360 Madagascar Vanilla, 360 Grape, 360 Mandarin Orange, 360 Sorrento Lemon, 360 Bing Cherry, 360 Georgia Peach, 360 Double Chocolate, and 360 KC Barbeque.
- Broker's Gin
- Five Farms Irish Cream
- McCormick Irish Cream
- Hussong's Tequila - Four different tequila products including: Reposado, Platinum, Silver, and Anejo
- Tarantula Azul
- Tequila Rose Strawberry Flavored Cream Liqueur
- Montego Bay Rum

== Awards ==
360 Vodka has received awards for taste and innovation including the 2009 gold medal and 2008 bronze medal for best vodka at the San Francisco World Spirits Competition; a gold medal from the Beverage Testing institute (2010), gold medal from the Los Angeles Wine and Spirits competition (2009) and a platinum medal from the SIP awards (2010) for 360 Double Chocolate.

McCormick's Irish Cream won the 2003 gold medal at the San Francisco World Spirits Competition and was voted the #1 Irish cream beverage by the Beverage Testing Institute. Hussong's won the 2006 Gold medal at the San Francisco World Spirits Championship.

== Green initiatives ==
In November 2007, the McCormick Distillery implemented a number of business practices that are asserted to be sustainable and environmentally friendly. An internal committee called the "Green Group" was established to improve environmental performance, increase operating efficiencies and energy savings, and heighten employee awareness and conservation. In the first year of the new green initiatives, 167 tons of material was recycled, with a participation rate of 88% among employees. To solidify the company's environmental commitment, McCormick Distilling partnered with the Environmental Protection Agency and Renewable Choice Energy. Some of the environmental initiatives implemented at the distillery include:

- On-site air pumps for car tires so that employees can maintain their vehicles' optimum fuel efficiency
- On-site recycling
- Preferred parking spaces reserved for employees who drive hybrid and/or electric vehicles to work

=== 360 Vodka ===
As part of the company's green initiative, 360 Vodka was marketed as "the Planet's first eco-friendly vodka". 360 Vodka is bottled using 85% recycled glass, 100% recycled paper and water-based UV inks. The grains used are grown less than 95 miles from the distillery to minimize the fossil-fuel consumption associated with transporting the grain. Consumers are allowed to return the bottle's swing-top closure to the company to be recycled, and for every top recycled, McCormick Distilling donates $1.00 to Global Green USA.

=== Forest 360 ===
"Forest 360" is a campaign to reduce carbon dioxide emissions and greenhouse gasses that lead to global warming. With the assistance of the Missouri Department of Conservation, McCormick Distilling planted more than 200 indigenous trees on 40 acres of land surrounding the distillery and has invited business partners to do the same. Official participants of "Forest 360" include the Republic National Distributing Company, MGP ingredients, Hovey Williams I.P Law, J.B Thome and Co. Inc., Young's Market Company, Binder-Edelstein Company, Southern Wine and Spirits of Colorado, Fast Ireland Spirits.

== Marketing ==
The company created and posted a series of cocktail how-to videos, distributed through social media networks like Facebook and YouTube. In 2011, the 360 Vodka Virtual bartender application was launched to promote the concept of creating green cocktails.

== Collectible decanters ==
McCormick Distilling has produced a series of decanters which are sought after by collectors. Produced between 1968 and 1987, at least 175 decanters were released in collections, the most popular of which were forty different decanters featuring Elvis Presley at every phase in his career.

=== Decanter series ===
- Automotive and Transportation
- Bicentennial series
- Birds
- Bulls
- Confederate series
- Elvis series
- Entertainer series
- Frontiersman series
- Great Americans series
- Gunfighter series
- Jugs
- Lamp series
- Pirate series
- Shrine series
- Sports and sports mascots
- Warrior series
- King Arthur series
- Miscellaneous.

== 1996 Export investigation ==
From 1996 to 1999, the company sold nearly five million gallons of disguised grain alcohol to a freight forwarder operated by a Russian immigrant for eventual smuggling into Russia. The shipper was suspected of having ties to some of the most powerful mob clans in Russia. Other distillers, brokers, and shippers around the United States were also reported to have been under investigation by U.S. authorities. McCormick was charged and pleaded guilty to a misdemeanor count of making a false entry in regulatory documents, in which it identified the alcohol as non-drinkable products such as industrial cleaning solutions (thereby evading tax duties), and it agreed to pay $2 million in penalties and $1 million in reparations paid to the government of Ukraine, and accepted a one-week suspension of its license.

== See also ==
- List of historic whisky distilleries
