= Weston Historic District =

Historic district in Missouri, United States

- U.S. National Register of Historic Places
- U.S. Historic district
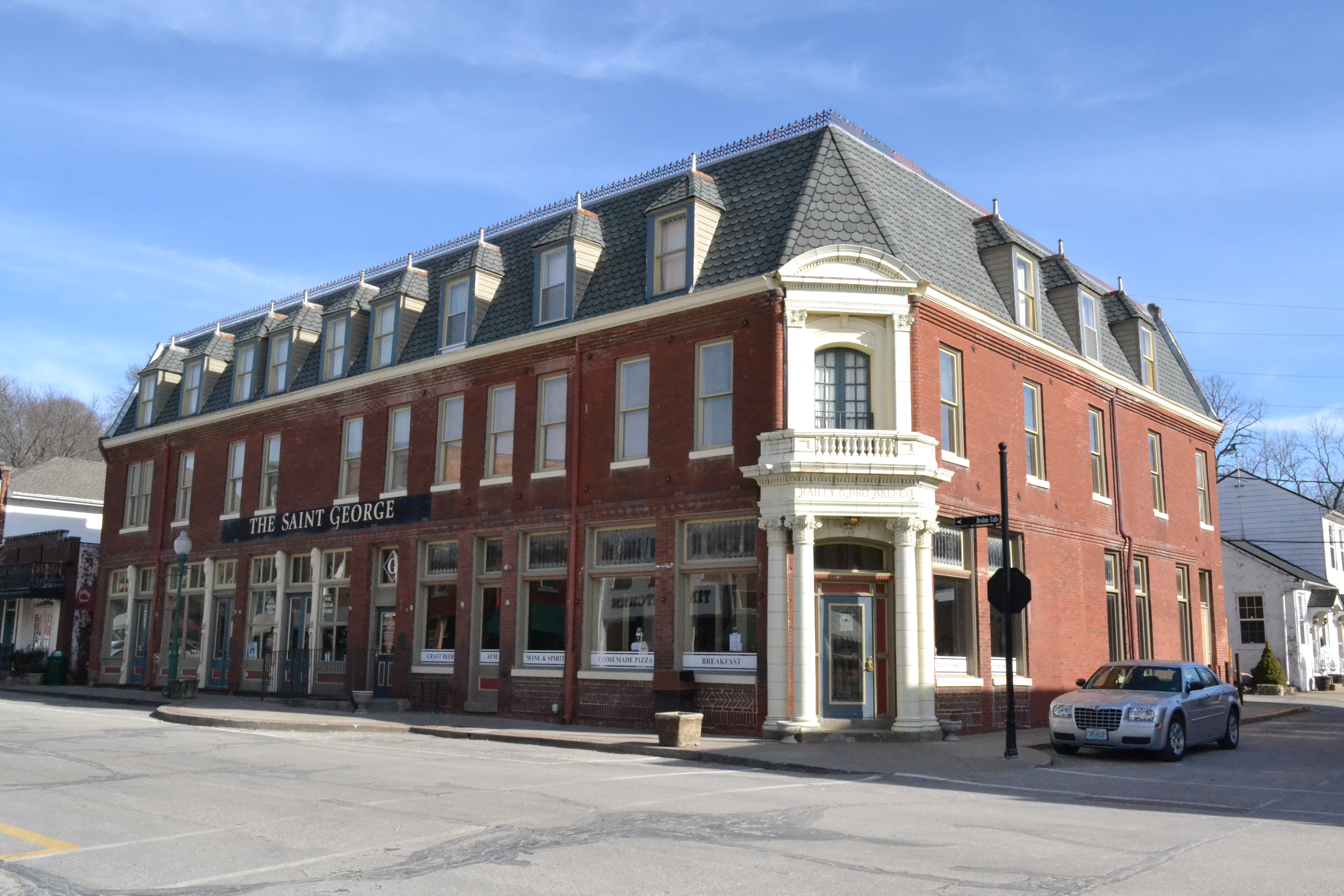

- Location within Missouri Location within the United States
- Location: Roughly bounded by Summit, Rock, Market and Ashley, Weston, Missouri
- Coordinates: 39°24′47″N 94°54′06″W
- Area: 131.2 acres (53.1 ha)
- Architect: Multiple
- Architectural style: Late Victorian, Federal
- NRHP reference No.: 72000727
- Added to NRHP: August 21, 1972

Weston Historic District is a national historic district located at Weston, Platte County, Missouri. The district encompasses 16 full blocks and portions of 8 additional city blocks in the central business district and surrounding residential sections of Weston. It developed between about 1840 and 1920, and includes representative examples of Federal and Late Victorian style architecture. Notable buildings include the John Maitland Home (c. 1860), Humphrey House, Railey Brothers Banking Building, Hull Mill, Methodist Church (1868), old Presbyterian Church (1846), German Evangelical Lutheran Church (1867), Weston Baptist Church or Weston Historical Museum and Library Building(1902), and McGhay House.

It was listed on the National Register of Historic Places in 1972.
