= Platte City, Missouri =

City in Missouri, U.S.

- City
- Location of Platte City, Missouri
- Coordinates: 39°21′27″N 94°45′55″W
- Country: United States
- State: Missouri
- County: Platte
- Township: Carroll

Government
  - Mayor: Steven Hoeger

Area
  - Total: 3.99 sq mi (10.33 km^{2})
  - Land: 3.97 sq mi (10.27 km^{2})
  - Water: 0.023 sq mi (0.06 km^{2})
- Elevation: 968 ft (295 m)

Population (2020)
  - Total: 4,784
  - Density: 1,206.4/sq mi (465.79/km^{2})
- Time zone: UTC-6 (Central (CST))
  - Summer (DST): UTC-5 (CDT)
- ZIP code: 64079
- Area codes: 816, 975
- FIPS code: 29-58178
- GNIS feature ID: 2396226
- Website: www.plattecity.org

Platte City is a city in and the county seat of Platte County, Missouri, United States, that is part of the Kansas City metropolitan area. The population was 4,784 at the 2020 census.

== History ==
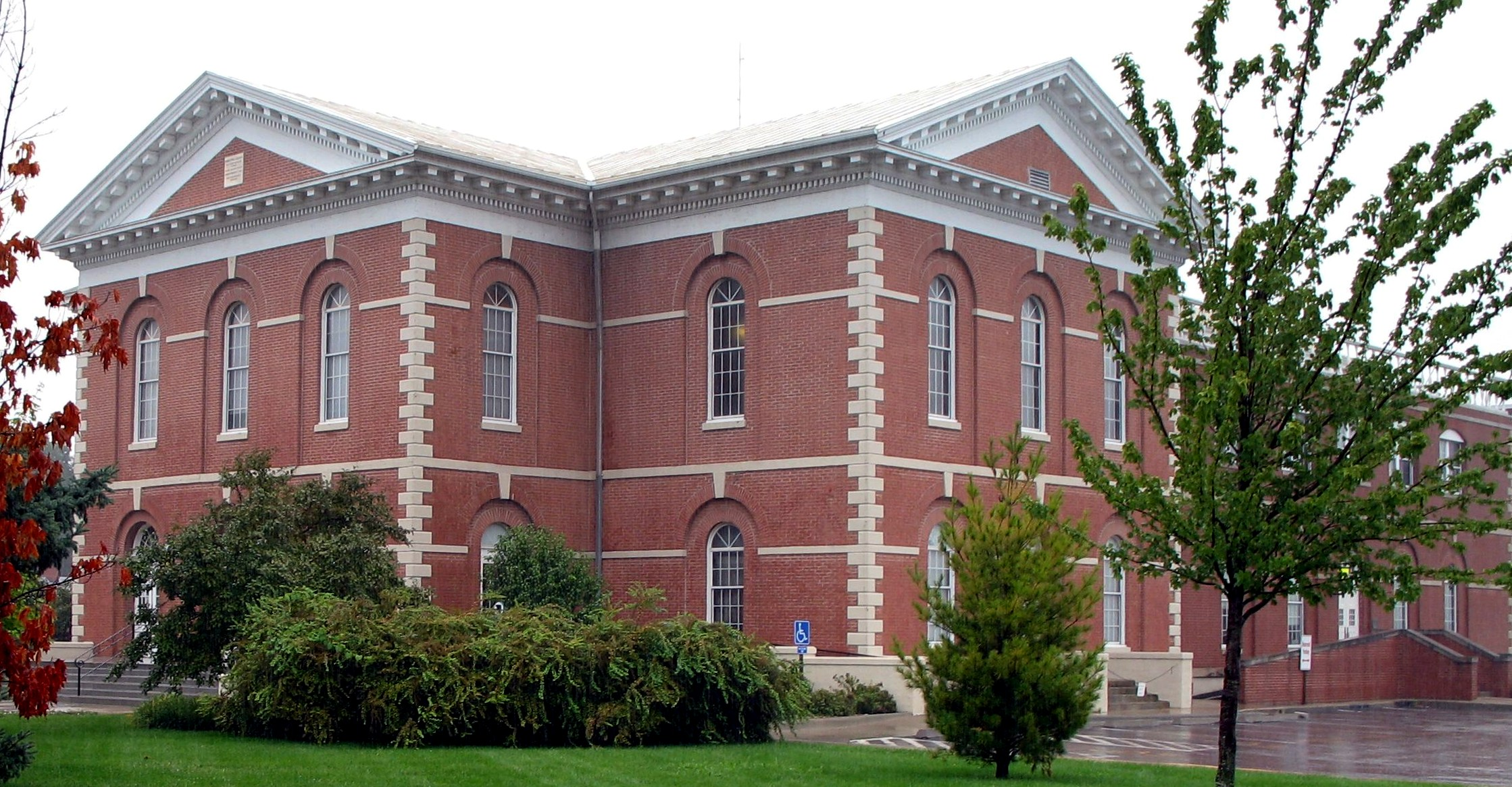
Platte County Courthouse in Platte City was built after the original courthouse was destroyed in the Burning of Platte City during the American Civil War. Blanche Barrow was held at the adjoining jail following a Bonnie and Clyde shootout just south of Platte City at the Red Crown Tourist Court.

Platte City was founded by Zadock "Zed" Martin and was incorporated as a city in September 1843.

On December 16, 1861, Colonel W. James Morgan's Union Squad razed Platte City, including the courthouse.

The Platte County Fair held annually just outside Platte City began in 1863 and is the oldest continuously operating fair west of the Mississippi River.

On April 3, 1882, Jesse James planned a robbery of the Platte City bank, but it was never carried out due to his assassination by Robert Ford on the morning of the raid.

On July 19, 1933 Bonnie and Clyde were ambushed by, and engaged in, a shootout with local authorities just south of Platte City at the Red Crown Tourist Court.

The Frederick Krause Mansion and Platte County Courthouse are listed on the National Register of Historic Places.

== Geography ==
Platte City is located along the south side of the Platte River and the Platte Falls Conservation Area lies to the northeast along the flood plain. I-29 passes the east side of the city and Missouri Route 92 serves the city. Tracy lies on the north side of the river flood plain. Gibson Branch headwaters within the city limits and flows southwesterly out of it into the Platte River.

According to the United States Census Bureau, the city has a total area of 3.65 square miles (9.45 km^{2}), of which 3.61 square miles (9.35 km^{2}) is land and 0.04 square miles (0.10 km^{2}) is water.

== Demographics ==
Historical population
Census	Pop.	Note	%±
1850	495		—
1860	875		76.8%
1870	599		−31.5%
1880	670		11.9%
1890	706		5.4%
1900	744		5.4%
1910	763		2.6%
1920	558		−26.9%
1930	587		5.2%
1940	675		15.0%
1950	742		9.9%
1960	1,188		60.1%
1970	2,022		70.2%
1980	2,114		4.5%
1990	2,947		39.4%
2000	3,866		31.2%
2010	4,691		21.3%
2020	4,784		2.0%
U.S. Decennial Census

=== 2020 census ===
As of the 2020 census, Platte City had a population of 4,784. The median age was 37.2 years. 23.0% of residents were under the age of 18 and 14.8% of residents were 65 years of age or older. For every 100 females there were 95.4 males, and for every 100 females age 18 and over there were 92.1 males age 18 and over.

99.5% of residents lived in urban areas, while 0.5% lived in rural areas.

There were 2,021 households in Platte City, of which 30.6% had children under the age of 18 living in them. Of all households, 36.7% were married-couple households, 23.3% were households with a male householder and no spouse or partner present, and 32.3% were households with a female householder and no spouse or partner present. About 35.2% of all households were made up of individuals and 10.8% had someone living alone who was 65 years of age or older.

There were 2,242 housing units, of which 9.9% were vacant. The homeowner vacancy rate was 2.8% and the rental vacancy rate was 11.0%.

Racial composition as of the 2020 census
Race	Number	Percent
White	3,998	83.6%
Black or African American	204	4.3%
American Indian and Alaska Native	24	0.5%
Asian	76	1.6%
Native Hawaiian and Other Pacific Islander	32	0.7%
Some other race	90	1.9%
Two or more races	360	7.5%
Hispanic or Latino (of any race)	302	6.3%

=== 2010 census ===
As of the census of 2010, there were 4,691 people, 1,975 households, and 1,174 families living in the city. The population density was 1,299.4 inhabitants per square mile (501.7/km^{2}). There were 2,214 housing units at an average density of 613.3 per square mile (236.8/km^{2}). The racial makeup of the city was 88.9% White, 4.6% African American, 0.5% Native American, 1.4% Asian, 0.2% Pacific Islander, 1.6% from other races, and 2.9% from two or more races. Hispanic or Latino of any race were 4.9% of the population.

There were 1,975 households, of which 32.5% had children under the age of 18 living with them, 41.7% were married couples living together, 12.9% had a female householder with no husband present, 4.9% had a male householder with no wife present, and 40.6% were non-families. 34.9% of all households were made up of individuals, and 9.3% had someone living alone who was 65 years of age or older. The average household size was 2.29 and the average family size was 2.97.

The median age in the city was 35.2 years. 24.2% of residents were under the age of 18; 9.3% were between the ages of 18 and 24; 31.3% were from 25 to 44; 23.6% were from 45 to 64; and 11.6% were 65 years of age or older. The gender makeup of the city was 50.4% male and 49.6% female.

=== 2000 census ===
As of the census of 2000, there were 3,866 people, 1,486 households, and 1,017 families living in the city. The population density was 1,147.2 inhabitants per square mile (442.9/km^{2}). There were 1,569 housing units at an average density of 465.6 per square mile (179.8/km^{2}). The racial makeup of the city was 92.08% White, 3.34% African American, 0.49% Native American, 0.80% Asian, 1.16% from other races, and 2.12% from two or more races. Hispanic or Latino of any race were 2.79% of the population.

There were 1,486 households, out of which 37.1% had children under the age of 18 living with them, 51.7% were married couples living together, 12.5% had a female householder with no husband present, and 31.5% were non-families. 25.7% of all households were made up of individuals, and 6.7% had someone living alone who was 65 years of age or older. The average household size was 2.48 and the average family size was 2.99.

In the city, the population was spread out, with 27.1% under the age of 18, 8.8% from 18 to 24, 34.6% from 25 to 44, 19.3% from 45 to 64, and 10.1% who were 65 years of age or older. The median age was 33 years. For every 100 females, there were 99.1 males. For every 100 females age 18 and over, there were 94.4 males.

The median income for a household in the city was $46,379, and the median income for a family was $52,548. Males had a median income of $36,563 versus $26,169 for females. The per capita income for the city was $20,288. About 4.8% of families and 6.2% of the population were below the poverty line, including 8.0% of those under age 18 and 9.2% of those age 65 or over.

== Education ==
Platte County R-3 School District, which includes this municipality, operates four elementary schools, two middle schools and Platte County High School.

Platte City itself is divided between the attendance boundaries of Compass Elementary School and Siegrist Elementary School, and both of those schools feed into Platte City Middle School. A portion of northwestern Kansas City is divided into the attendance boundaries of Barry Elementary School and Pathfinder Elementary School, and both of those schools feed into Platte Purchase Middle School.

Platte City has a public library, a branch of the Mid-Continent Public Library.

== Transportation ==
Platte City is accessible via Interstate 29 at exit 18.

== See also ==
- List of cities in Missouri
