= Parkville, Missouri =

City in Platte County, Missouri, United States

- City
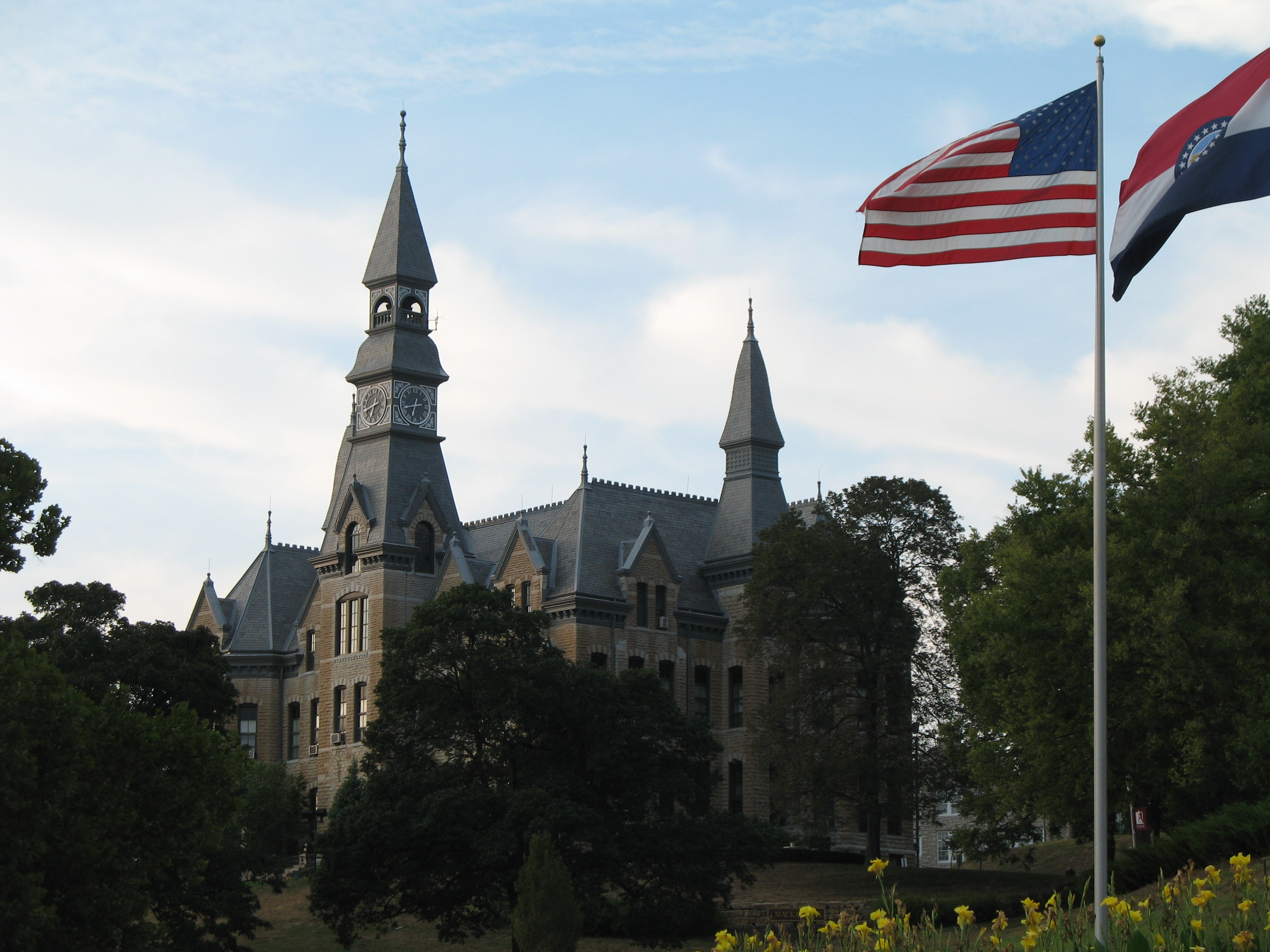
- McKay Hall at Park University

- Location of Parkville, Missouri

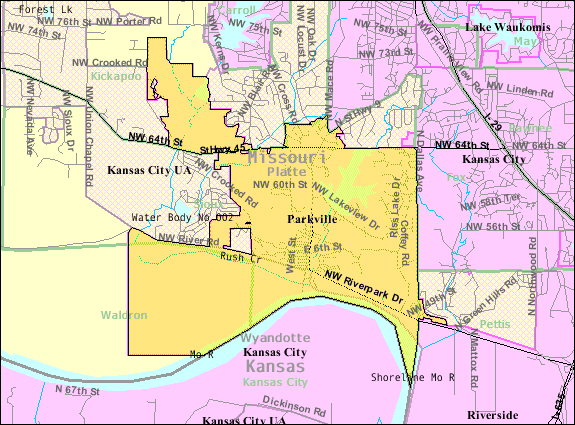
- Coordinates: 39°11′14″N 94°44′32″W
- Country: United States
- State: Missouri
- County: Platte
- Platted: 1844
- Incorporated: 1858

Government
  - Mayor: Dean Katerndahl

Area
  - Total: 15.576 sq mi (40.342 km^{2})
  - Land: 14.948 sq mi (38.715 km^{2})
  - Water: 0.627 sq mi (1.625 km^{2})
- Elevation: 748 ft (228 m)

Population (2020)
  - Total: 7,117
  - Estimate (2026): 13,376
  - Density: 574/sq mi (221.7/km^{2})
- Time zone: UTC−6 (Central (CST))
  - Summer (DST): UTC−5 (CDT)
- ZIP codes: 64151-64152
- Area code: 816
- FIPS code: 29-56288
- GNIS feature ID: 2396154
- Sales tax: 7.975%
- Website: parkvillemo.gov

Parkville is a city in Platte County, Missouri, United States, that is part of the Kansas City Metropolitan Area. The population was 7,177 at the 2020 census. Parkville is known for its antique shops, art galleries, and historic downtown. The city is home to Park University, English Landing Park, Platte Landing Park, and the National Golf Club of Kansas City. Large neighborhoods in Parkville include: Riss Lake, The National, Thousand Oaks, Creekside, Parkville Heights, River Hills, Riverchase, The Bluffs, Downtown, and Pinecrest.

== History ==
A post office called Parkville was established in 1841, named for settler George S. Park. The town of Parkville was platted in 1844 That post office closed in 1962.

The Benjamin Banneker School, Mackay Building, Charles Smith Scott Memorial Observatory, Waddell "A" Truss Bridge, and Washington Chapel C.M.E. Church are listed on the National Register of Historic Places.

== Geography ==
According to the United States Census Bureau, the city has a total area of 15.576 square miles (40.34 km^{2}), of which 14.948 square miles (38.72 km^{2}) is land and 0.628 square miles (1.63 km^{2}) is water. The city is fairly hilly and borders the Missouri River and Kansas City, Missouri.

== Demographics ==
Historical population
Census	Pop.	Note	%±
1850	309		—
1880	482		—
1890	769		59.5%
1900	931		21.1%
1910	765		−17.8%
1920	619		−19.1%
1930	636		2.7%
1940	671		5.5%
1950	1,186		76.8%
1960	1,229		3.6%
1970	1,253		2.0%
1980	2,091		66.9%
1990	2,402		14.9%
2000	4,059		69.0%
2010	5,554		36.8%
2020	7,117		28.1%
2026 (est.)	13,376		87.9%
U.S. Decennial Census; 2020 Census

=== 2020 census ===
As of the 2020 census, Parkville had a population of 7,117. The population density was 466 inhabitants per square mile (179.9/km^{2}). The median age was 39.1 years. 24.5% of residents were under the age of 18 and 13.9% of residents were 65 years of age or older. For every 100 females there were 95.7 males, and for every 100 females age 18 and over there were 97.5 males age 18 and over.

96.8% of residents lived in urban areas, while 3.2% lived in rural areas.

There were 2,450 households in Parkville, of which 37.7% had children under the age of 18 living in them. Of all households, 67.1% were married-couple households, 12.2% were households with a male householder and no spouse or partner present, and 16.4% were households with a female householder and no spouse or partner present. About 18.9% of all households were made up of individuals and 8.2% had someone living alone who was 65 years of age or older.

There were 2,616 housing units, of which 6.3% were vacant. The homeowner vacancy rate was 1.9% and the rental vacancy rate was 10.0%.

Racial composition as of the 2020 census
Race	Number	Percent
White	5,918	83.2%
Black or African American	352	4.9%
American Indian and Alaska Native	27	0.4%
Asian	147	2.1%
Native Hawaiian and Other Pacific Islander	8	0.1%
Some other race	135	1.9%
Two or more races	530	7.4%
Hispanic or Latino (of any race)	355	5.0%

=== Income, poverty, and education ===
The median income for a household in the city was $144,127 and the median income for a family was $174,594. About 0.1% of the population was below the poverty line.

About 71% of the population held a Bachelor's degree or higher and 98% were high school graduates. Households with a computer: 96%; households with broadband Internet access: 94%.

=== 2010 census ===
As of the 2010 census, there were 5,554 people, 1,974 households, and 1,469 families living in the city. The population density was 375.5 inhabitants per square mile (145.0/km^{2}). There were 2,126 housing units at an average density of 143.7 per square mile (55.5/km^{2}). The racial makeup of the city was 89.5% White, 4.0% African American, 0.1% Native American, 3.0% Asian, 0.3% Pacific Islander, 0.6% from other races, and 2.5% from two or more races. Hispanic or Latino of any race were 3.7% of the population.

There were 1,974 households, of which 37.4% had children under the age of 18 living with them, 63.6% were married couples living together, 6.6% had a female householder with no husband present, 4.2% had a male householder with no wife present, and 25.6% were non-families. 20.9% of all households were made up of individuals, and 5.8% had someone living alone who was 65 years of age or older. The average household size was 2.61 and the average family size was 3.05.

The median age in the city was 39.1 years. 25.6% of residents were under the age of 18; 12.7% were between the ages of 18 and 24; 20% were from 25 to 44; 32.6% were from 45 to 64; and 9.1% were 65 years of age or older.

=== 2000 census ===
As of the 2000 census, there were 4,059 people, 1,510 households, and 1,060 families living in the city. The population density was 586.9 inhabitants per square mile (226.6/km^{2}). There were 1,587 housing units at an average density of 229.5 per square mile (88.6/km^{2}). The racial makeup of the city was 90.37% White, 4.71% African American, 0.52% Native American, 1.31% Asian, 0.96% Pacific Islander, 0.81% from other races, and 1.33% from two or more races. Hispanic or Latino of any race were 2.27% of the population.

There were 1,510 households, out of which 37.4% had children under the age of 18 living with them, 59.1% were married couples living together, 7.7% had a female householder with no husband present, and 29.8% were non-families. 23.8% of all households were made up of individuals, and 5.6% had someone living alone who was 65 years of age or older. The average household size was 2.54 and the average family size was 3.04.

In the city, the population was spread out, with 26.4% under the age of 18, 12.4% from 18 to 24, 29.9% from 25 to 44, 25.2% from 45 to 64, and 6.1% who were 65 years of age or older. The median age was 36 years. For every 100 females, there were 95.0 males. For every 100 females age 18 and over, there were 93.5 males.

The median income for a household in the city was $68,600, and the median income for a family was $86,820. Males had a median income of $64,917 versus $31,740 for females. The per capita income for the city was $33,119. About 5.0% of families and 6.5% of the population were below the poverty line, including 8.1% of those under age 18 and 3.3% of those age 65 or over.

== Education ==
Almost all of Parkville is in the Park Hill School District. It operates twelve elementary schools, four middle schools, two high schools and one alternative high school.

A small part of Parkville is in the Platte County R-III School District.

Metropolitan Community College has the Park Hill school district in its taxation area, while the Platte County R-III district is in its service area but not its taxation area.

Park University, a private institution, has been in operation at Parkville since 1875.

== Notable people ==
- Bill Grigsby, American sportscaster and member of the Missouri Sports Hall of Fame
- George S. Park, Texas War of Independence hero, and founder of Parkville, Park University, and Manhattan, Kansas
- Frank Ringo, professional baseball player from 1880 to 1888

== See also ==
- List of cities in Missouri
