= Platte County Courthouse (Missouri) =

- U.S. National Register of Historic Places
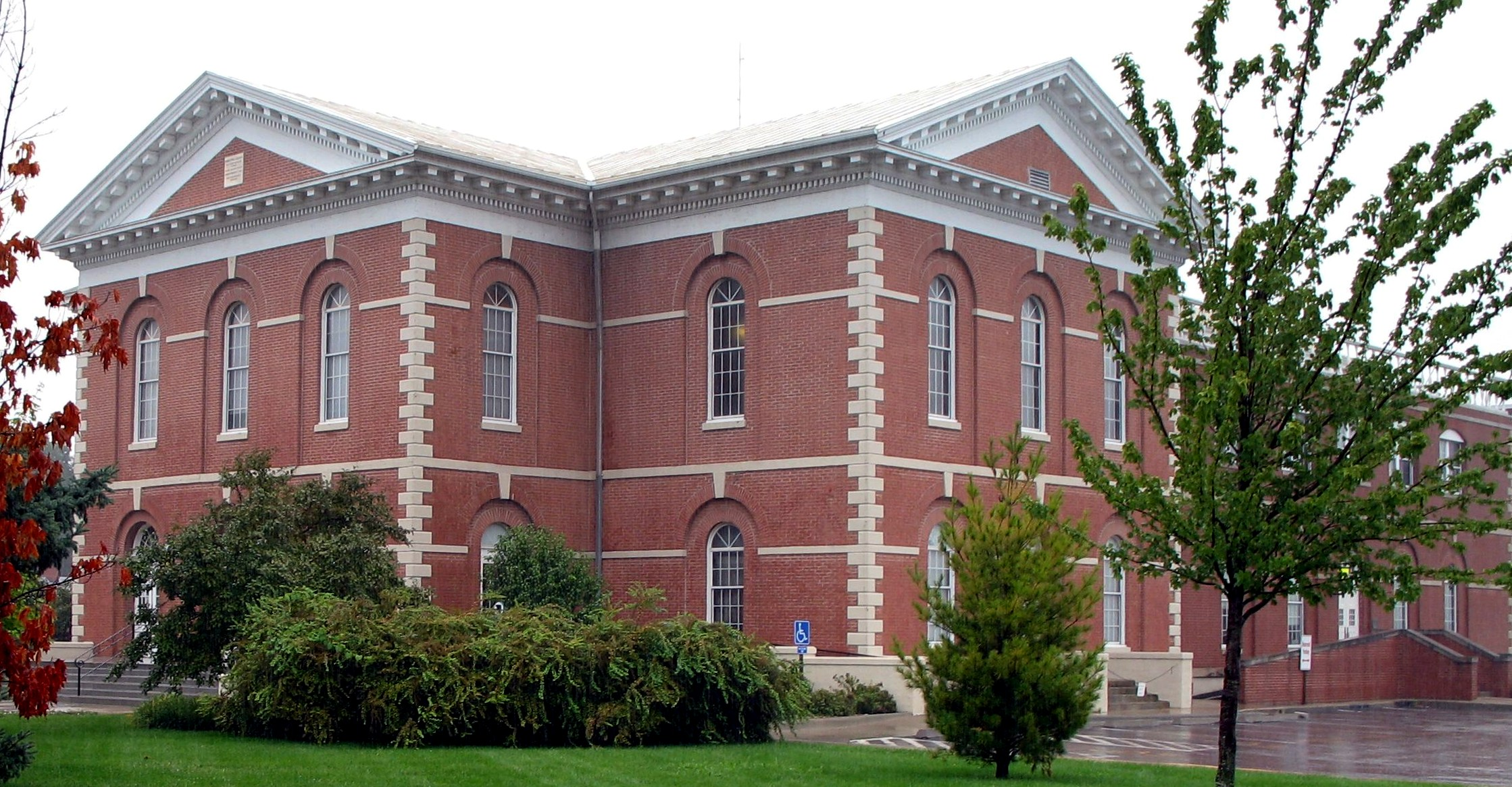

- Location within Missouri Location within the United States
- Interactive map showing the location for Plate County Courthouse
- Location: 3rd and Main Sts., Platte City, Missouri
- Coordinates: 39°22′15″N 94°46′47″W
- Area: 2.1 acres (0.85 ha)
- Built: 1866-1867
- Architect: McDuff, Peter
- NRHP reference No.: 79001390
- Added to NRHP: January 17, 1979

Platte County Courthouse is a historic courthouse located at Platte City, Platte County, Missouri. It was built in 1866–1867, and is a two-story, cruciform plan, red brick building on a limestone foundation. It has a low pitched cross-gable roof.

It was listed on the National Register of Historic Places in 1979.
