= Weston, Missouri =

City in Platte County, Missouri, United States

- City
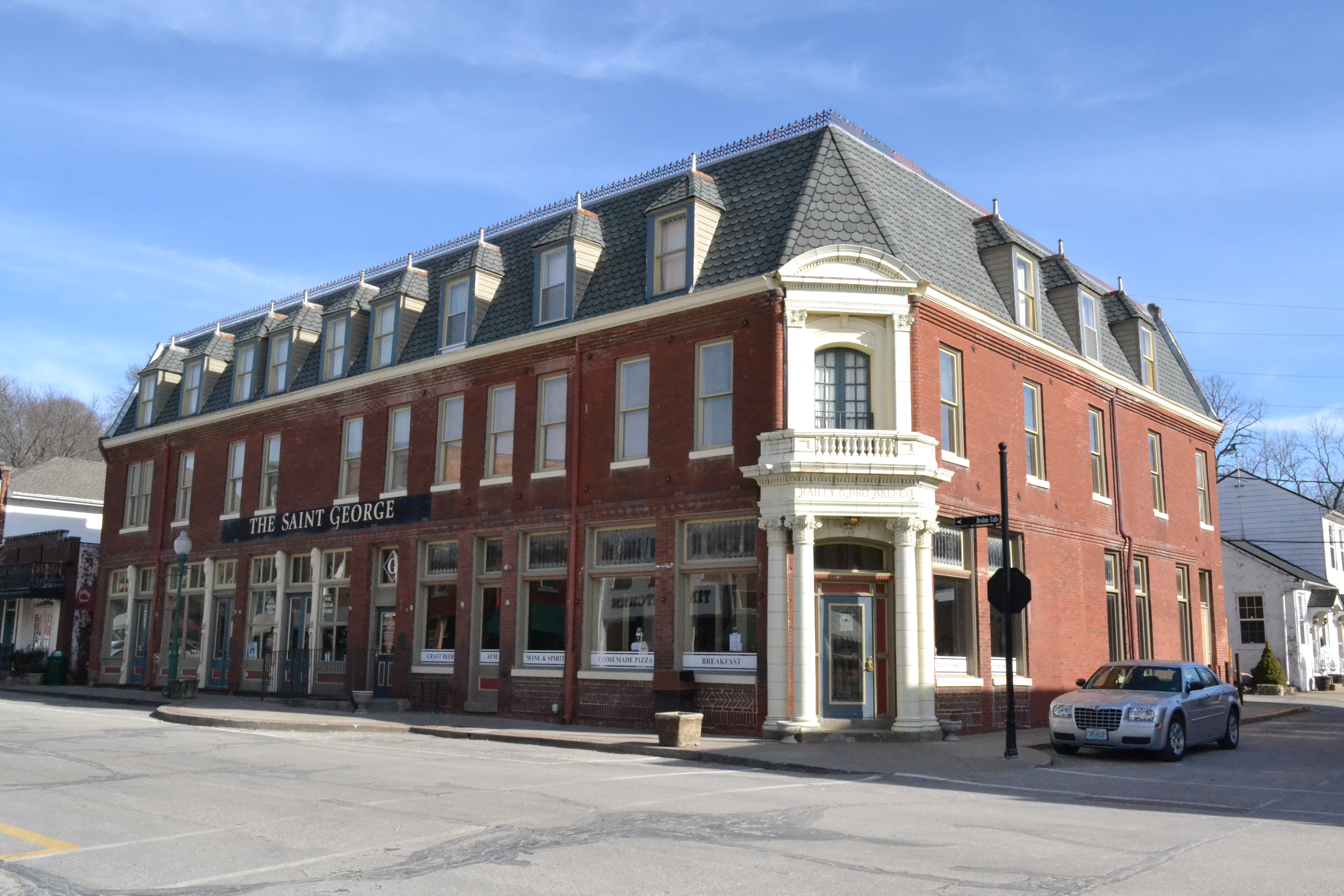

- Location of Weston, Missouri
- Coordinates: 39°24′20″N 94°53′21″W
- Country: United States
- State: Missouri
- County: Platte
- Township: Weston
- Established: 1838

Area
  - Total: 3.83 sq mi (9.93 km^{2})
  - Land: 3.80 sq mi (9.83 km^{2})
  - Water: 0.039 sq mi (0.10 km^{2})
- Elevation: 971 ft (296 m)

Population (2020)
  - Total: 1,756
  - Density: 462.6/sq mi (178.62/km^{2})
- Time zone: UTC-6 (Central (CST))
  - Summer (DST): UTC-5 (CDT)
- ZIP code: 64098
- Area code: 816
- FIPS code: 29-78856
- GNIS feature ID: 2397282
- Website: www.westonmo.us

Weston is a city in Platte County, Missouri, United States. The population was 1,756 at the 2020 census.

== History ==
The Lewis and Clark Expedition stopped at "Bear Medison" island, near the location of today's city hall. Weston was the oldest settlement in the Platte Purchase of 1836 and was therefore also the farthest western settlement (thus, "West Town") in the United States until the admission of Texas as a state in 1845. Another suggested theory of origin is related to a story about a discharged US Army dragoon by the name of Joseph Moore. He bought the land and then had First Sergeant Tom Weston of D Company, First Dragoons, stationed at Fort Leavenworth across the Missouri River, lay out a town plan. The town may have therefore been named for Sgt. Weston.

William "Buffalo Bill" Cody was at one time a resident of Weston, and the town was a major "jumping off" point for the Santa Fe Trail, the Oregon Trail and the California Gold Rush.

In 1881, Weston was the site of the lynching of the biracial Charles Reese after he was accused of the rape and murder of the sixteen-year-old Nancy Stillwell.

Weston was, at one time, the second largest port on the Missouri River, surpassing both Kansas City and St. Joseph and at one point shortly after its founding, claimed to be the second largest city in Missouri. In 1850, over 265 steamboats a year docked at the Port of Weston. A flood in 1881 shifted the river into an old channel some two miles away.

The Weston Brewing Company was first established in 1842 by German immigrant John Georgian, and was one of the first lager beer breweries in the U.S. Five arched, limestone cellars, dug to a depth of 55 feet below ground, were constructed to create the ideal conditions for Georgian's lager beer, which needed to be stored below 60 degrees. The brewery closed in 1919 when Prohibition was signed into law. In 2005, the Weston Brewing Company reopened and one of the cellars now houses a unique bar which requires patrons to descend down through a small rock faced tunnel to get to the large, cool, cavern like bar.

The McCormick Distillery, Missouri District Warehouse, Pleasant Ridge United Baptist Church, Sugar Creek Site, and Weston Historic District are listed on the National Register of Historic Places.

== Geography ==
According to the United States Census Bureau, the city has a total area of 3.35 square miles (8.68 km^{2}), all land.

== Demographics ==
Historical population
Census	Pop.	Note	%±
1850	1,915		—
1860	1,810		−5.5%
1870	1,614		−10.8%
1880	1,329		−17.7%
1890	1,134		−14.7%
1900	1,019		−10.1%
1910	1,019		0.0%
1920	991		−2.7%
1930	1,028		3.7%
1940	1,121		9.0%
1950	1,067		−4.8%
1960	1,057		−0.9%
1970	1,267		19.9%
1980	1,440		13.7%
1990	1,528		6.1%
2000	1,631		6.7%
2010	1,641		0.6%
2020	1,756		7.0%
U.S. Decennial Census

=== 2020 census ===
As of the 2020 census, Weston had a population of 1,756. The median age was 41.9 years. 22.9% of residents were under the age of 18 and 20.6% of residents were 65 years of age or older. For every 100 females there were 87.6 males, and for every 100 females age 18 and over there were 85.6 males age 18 and over.

0.0% of residents lived in urban areas, while 100.0% lived in rural areas.

There were 761 households in Weston, of which 30.7% had children under the age of 18 living in them. Of all households, 47.4% were married-couple households, 16.6% were households with a male householder and no spouse or partner present, and 30.4% were households with a female householder and no spouse or partner present. About 32.5% of all households were made up of individuals and 14.6% had someone living alone who was 65 years of age or older.

There were 835 housing units, of which 8.9% were vacant. The homeowner vacancy rate was 1.0% and the rental vacancy rate was 4.2%.

Racial composition as of the 2020 census
Race	Number	Percent
White	1,627	92.7%
Black or African American	2	0.1%
American Indian and Alaska Native	14	0.8%
Asian	2	0.1%
Native Hawaiian and Other Pacific Islander	0	0.0%
Some other race	14	0.8%
Two or more races	97	5.5%
Hispanic or Latino (of any race)	45	2.6%

=== 2010 census ===
As of the census of 2010, there were 1,641 people, 702 households, and 457 families living in the city. The population density was 489.9 inhabitants per square mile (189.2/km^{2}). There were 781 housing units at an average density of 233.1 per square mile (90.0/km^{2}). The racial makeup of the city was 96.9% White, 0.4% African American, 0.1% Native American, 0.4% Asian, 0.5% from other races, and 1.7% from two or more races. Hispanic or Latino of any race were 2.4% of the population.

There were 702 households, of which 31.5% had children under the age of 18 living with them, 49.1% were married couples living together, 12.0% had a female householder with no husband present, 4.0% had a male householder with no wife present, and 34.9% were non-families. 30.8% of all households were made up of individuals, and 13.9% had someone living alone who was 65 years of age or older. The average household size was 2.34 and the average family size was 2.93.

The median age in the city was 42 years. 23.9% of residents were under the age of 18; 6% were between the ages of 18 and 24; 24.4% were from 25 to 44; 29.5% were from 45 to 64; and 16.3% were 65 years of age or older. The gender makeup of the city was 48.0% male and 52.0% female.

=== 2000 census ===
As of the census of 2000, there were 1,631 people, 676 households, and 459 families living in the city. The population density was 994.8 inhabitants per square mile (384.1/km^{2}). There were 724 housing units at an average density of 441.6 per square mile (170.5/km^{2}). The racial makeup of the city was 97.49% White, 0.67% Native American, 0.18% Asian, 0.49% from other races, and 1.16% from two or more races. Hispanic or Latino of any race were 1.10% of the population.

There were 676 households, out of which 32.0% had children under the age of 18 living with them, 53.7% were married couples living together, 9.2% had a female householder with no husband present, and 32.1% were non-families. 28.8% of all households were made up of individuals, and 12.1% had someone living alone who was 65 years of age or older. The average household size was 2.40 and the average family size was 2.95.

The city's population as of the 2000 Census was as follows: 25.0% under the age of 18, 6.6% from 18 to 24, 28.6% from 25 to 44, 25.9% from 45 to 64, and 14.0% who were 65 years of age or older. The median age was 40 years. For every 100 females, there were 89.0 males. For every 100 females age 18 and over, there were 87.7 males.

The median household income in the city was $43,214, and the median income for a family was $53,015. Males had a median income of $36,466 versus $27,132 for females. The per capita income for the city was $20,794. About 5.2% of families and 7.1% of the population were below the poverty line, including 6.9% of those under age 18 and 12.7% of those age 65 or over.

== Economy ==
Weston is the home of McCormick Distilling Company, producers of a large number of liquors, it was founded in 1856, and is the oldest whiskey distillery west of the Mississippi River and the oldest continuously operated distillery in the United States.

Weston was, prior to its cultivation being prohibited by the 1937 Marihuana Tax Act, the world's leading producer of industrial hemp. It was the world's leading producer of twist tobacco with about 2.8 million pounds of tobacco being grown annually in Platte County. Production peaked in 1994 at 8.2 million. As of 2020, only a few farmers carry on this kind of cultivation.

== Education ==
It is in the West Platte County R-II School District. West Platte County School District operates two schools in Weston: Central Elementary School and West Platte High School.

Weston has a public library, a branch of the Mid-Continent Public Library.

== Notable people ==
- Ben Holladay (1819–1887), 19th century entrepreneur and businessman
- Bela M. Hughes (1817–1903), pioneer, was involved in the early development of Weston. He laid out a first street grid and marketed lots for settlers.
- Mayme Schweble (1874–1943), prospector and member of the Nevada Assembly, born in Weston
- Billy Winn (1909–1938), racing driver

== See also ==
- List of cities in Missouri
