= Pleasant Ridge United Baptist Church =

Historic church in Missouri, United States

- U.S. National Register of Historic Places
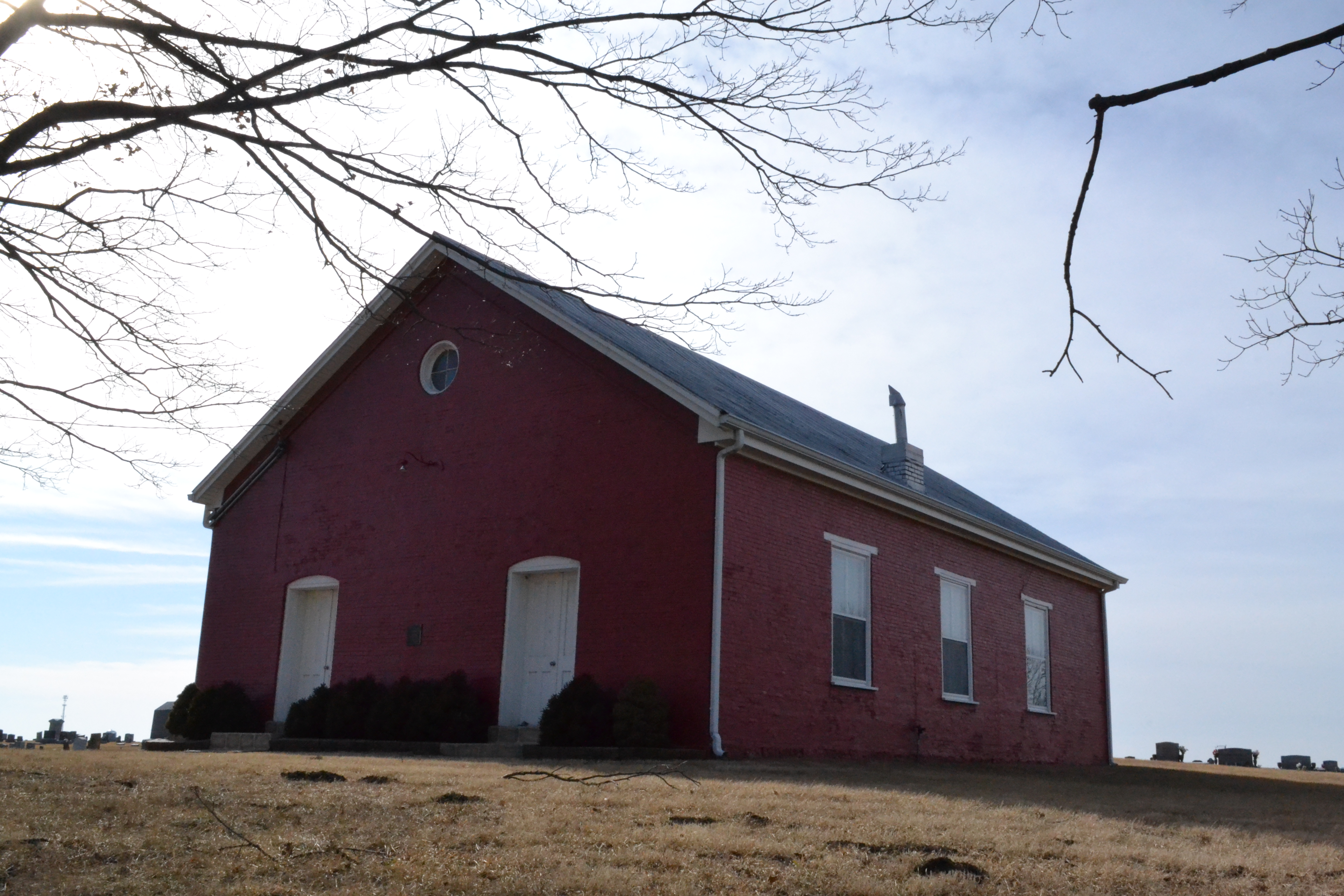

- Location within Missouri Location within the United States
- Location: Jct. of MO P and Woodruff Rd., Weston, Missouri
- Coordinates: 39°25′53″N 94°51′21″W
- Area: 7.5 acres (3.0 ha)
- Built: 1844
- Built by: Sanford, John
- Architectural style: gable end church
- NRHP reference No.: 02000162
- Added to NRHP: March 13, 2002

Pleasant Ridge United Baptist Church is a historic Baptist church located at the junction of MO P and Woodruff Road in Weston, Platte County, Missouri. It was built in 1844, and is a one-story, rectangular, brick building. It measures approximately 35 feet by 51 feet, and has a front gable roof. Located on the property is the Pleasant Ridge Cemetery with graves dating from 1848.

It was listed on the National Register of Historic Places in 2002.
