= List of Benedictine Ravens head football coaches =

Coaches of team representing Benedictine College

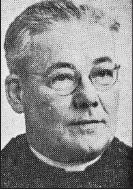
Father Malachy Sullivan was the first head coach at St. Benedict's College (the forerunner to Benedictine) for the 1920 and 1921 seasons.

The Benedictine Ravens football program is a college football team that represents Benedictine College in the Heart of America Athletic Conference, a part of the NAIA. The team has had 15 head coaches overall since its first recorded football game in 1920. The current coach is Joel Osborn who first took the position for the 2021 season.

== Key ==
Key to symbols in coaches list
General		Overall		Conference		Postseason (Note: Although the first Rose Bowl Game was played in 1902, it has been continuously played since the 1916 game, and is recognized as the oldest bowl game by the NCAA. "—" indicates any season prior to 1916 when postseason games were not played.)	
No.	Order of coaches (Note: A running total of the number of head coaches, with coaches who served separate tenures being counted only once. Interim head coaches are represented with "Int" and are not counted in the running total. "—" indicates the team played but either without a coach or no coach is on record. "X" indicates an interim year without play.)	GC	Games coached	CW	Conference wins	PW	Postseason wins
DC	Division championships	OW	Overall wins	CL	Conference losses	PL	Postseason losses
CC	Conference championships	OL	Overall losses	CT	Conference ties	PT	Postseason ties
NC	National championships	OT	Overall ties (Note: Overtime rules in college football were introduced in 1996, making ties impossible in the period since.)	C%	Conference winning percentage		
†	Elected to the College Football Hall of Fame	O%	Overall winning percentage (Note: When computing the win–loss percentage, a tie counts as half a win and half a loss.)				

== Coaches ==
Statistics correct as of the end of the 2025 college football season.

No.	Name	Term	GC	OW	OL	OT	O%	CW	CL	CT	C%	PW	PL	CCs	NCs	Awards
1	Malachy Sullivan	1920–1921	14	8	6	0	.571	—	—	—		—	—	—	—	
2	Larry Quigley	1922–1927	47	22	20	5	.521	—	—	—		—	—	—	—	
3	Robert Schmidt	1928–1931	33	10	20	3	.348	—	—	—		—	—	—	—	
4	Larry Mullins	1932–1936	44	37	5	2	.864	—	—	—		—	—	—	—	
5	Marty Peters	1937–1941	41	24	13	4	.634	—	—	—		—	—	1	—	
6	Rev. Michael Carroll	1942	8	6	2	0	.750	—	—	—		—	—	—	—	
7	Marty Peters	1946–1947	17	5	11	1	.324	—	—	—		—	—	—	—	
8	Bob Walsh	1948–1949	18	4	14	0	.222	—	—	—		—	—	—	—	
9	Leo Deutsch	1950–1952	27	13	13	1	.500	—	—	—		—	—	—	—	
10	Ivan Schottel	1953–1962	90	52	36	2	.589	—	—	—		—	—	5	—	
11	John Baricevic	1970–1973	30	9	20	1	.317	—	—	—		—	—	—	—	
12	George Tardiff	1974–1976	30	15	15	0	.500	—	—	—		1	—	—	—	
13	Matt May	1977–1978	20	10	10	0	.500	—	—	—		—	1	—	—	
14	Larry Wilcox	1979–2020	458	305	153	0	.666	—	—	—		7	14	2	—	
15	Joel Osborn	2021–	49	38	11	0	.776	—	—	—		3	3	—	—	

== See also ==
- List of people from Atchison County, Kansas
