= List of people from Atchison County, Kansas =

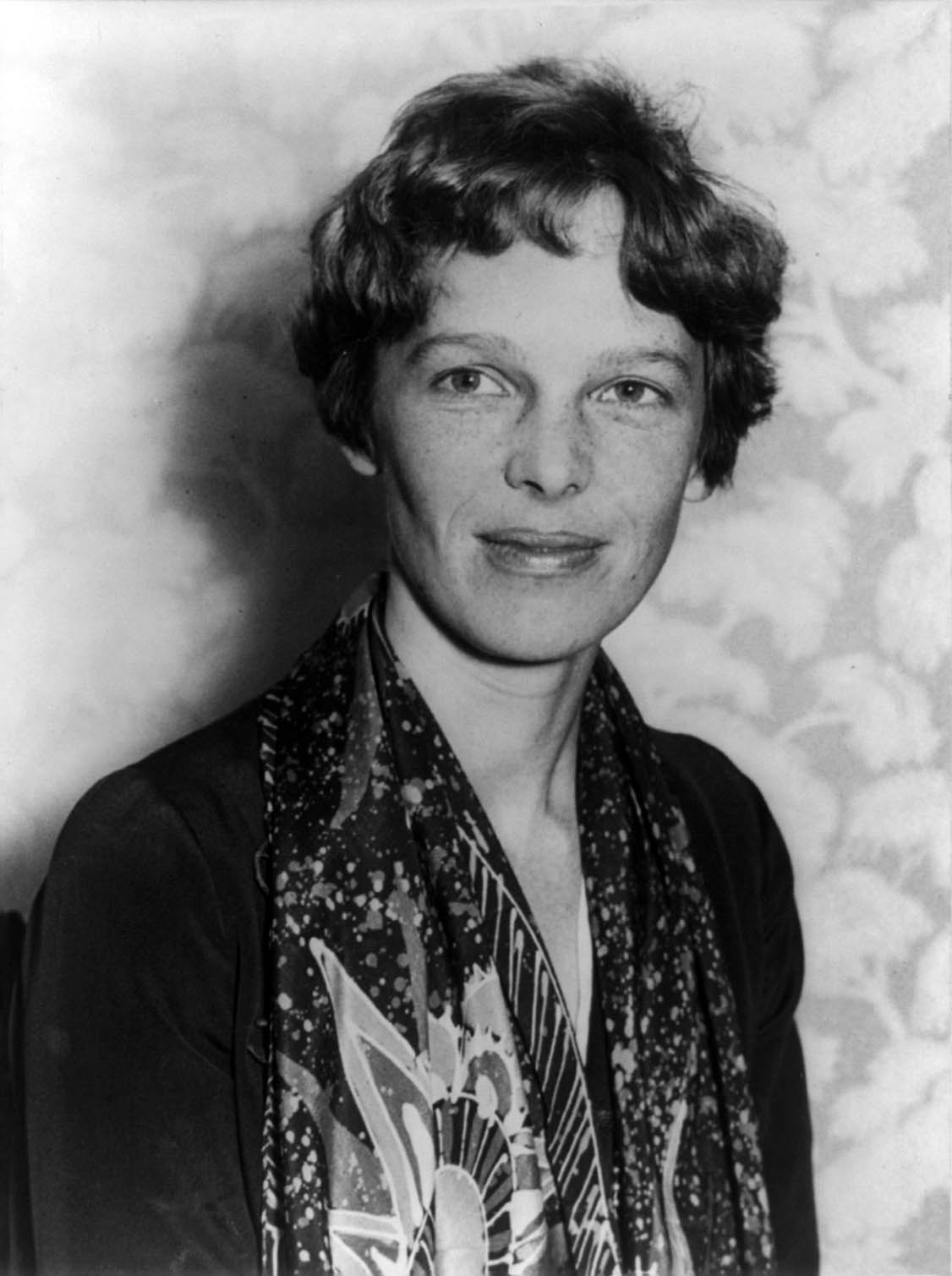
Amelia Earhart grew up in Atchison, was an early aviation pioneer, and was the first female to fly solo across the Atlantic Ocean.

The following is a list of people from Atchison County, Kansas. The area includes the cities of Atchison, Effingham, Huron, Lancaster, Muscotah, and rural areas in the county. Inclusion on the list should be reserved for notable people past and present who have resided in the county, either in cities or rural areas.

== Academics ==
- Mary Peters Fieser, chemist
- James Bennett Griffin, archeologist
- Paul Christoph Mangelsdorf, botanist and agronomist known for research in corn
- Charles Lester Marlatt, entomologist
- John L. Pollock, philosopher known for influential work in epistemology, philosophical logic, cognitive science, and artificial intelligence

== Arts and entertainment ==
- Carl Blair, artist
- Rory Lee Feek, country music singer
- Milo Hastings, writer
- Jesse Stone, rhythm and blues musician and songwriter whose influence spanned a wide range of genres and is credited to have done "more to develop the basic rock 'n' roll sound than anybody else"
- John Cameron Swayze, popular news commentator and game show panelist during the 1950s
- Frank Wilcox, character actor
- Max Yoho, humorist

== Athletics ==
- Carter Elliott, shortstop in Major League Baseball for the Chicago Cubs
- Leslie Geary, designed and raced numerous competitive sailing vessels, and also designed commuter yachts, fishing boats, tugboats, and wooden hulled freighters
- Heavy Johnson, baseball player in the Negro leagues
- Joe Tinker, Major League Baseball player for the Chicago Cubs
- Larry Wilcox, head college football coach for the Benedictine Ravens

== Aviation ==
- Amelia Earhart, aviation pioneer

== Clergy ==
- C. I. Scofield, theologian, minister, and writer whose best-selling annotated Bible popularized futurism and dispensationalism among fundamentalist Christians

== Journalism ==
- E. W. Howe, newspaper editor and novelist
- Roy A. Roberts, managing editor, president, editor and general manager of The Kansas City Star; guided the paper during its influential period during the presidencies of Harry S. Truman and Dwight D. Eisenhower

== Military ==
- Laura M. Cobb, former chief nurse of the United States Navy

== Politics and government ==
- Willis J. Bailey, 16th governor of Kansas
- William Thomas Bland, United States representative from Missouri
- Charles F. Cochran, United States representative from Missouri
- George Washington Glick, ninth governor of Kansas
- Jerry Henry, member of the Kansas House of Representatives
- John James Ingalls, politician
- Sheffield Ingalls, politician and former lieutenant governor of Kansas
- James Edmund Jeffries, United States representative from Kansas
- Victor Linley, member of the Wisconsin State Senate
- John Martin
- Chester L. Mize, United States representative from Kansas
- Samuel C. Pomeroy, United States senator from Kansas
- Jim Slattery, United States representative from Kansas
- Benjamin Franklin Stringfellow, Missouri attorney general, high-ranking border ruffian, one of the organizers of the Atchison, Topeka and Santa Fe Railroad

== Other ==
- Bangs Sisters, mediums who made a career out of painting the dead, or "spirit portraits"

== See also ==
- List of Benedictine Ravens head football coaches
- Lists of people from Kansas
