= Malachy (given name) =

Malachy (/ˈmæləki/ MAL-ə-kee) is a given name of Irish origin. Notable people with the name include:

== People ==
- Saint Malachy (1095–1148), Archbishop of Armagh and first native-born Irish saint
- Malachy of Ireland (fl. 1279–1300), theologian and archbishop
- Máel Sechnaill mac Máele Ruanaid, 9th-century High King of Ireland, also known as Malachy I
- Máel Sechnaill mac Domnaill, High King of Ireland in the late 10th and early 11th centuries, also known as Malachy II
- Malachy Carey (1956–1992), Irish republican
- Malachy Coney, Northern Irish comics writer and cartoonist
- Malachy Conlon (d. 1950), Northern Irish politician
- Malachy Bowes Daly (1836–1920), Canadian politician
- Malachy John Goltok (1965–2015), Nigerian Catholic bishop
- Malachy Higgins (born 1944), Northern Irish Lord Justice of Appeal
- Malachy Hitchins (1741–1809), Cornish astronomer and cleric
- Malachy Kilbride, Irish-American activist
- Malachy "Mal" Loye, English cricket player
- Malachy E. Mannion (born 1953), American judge
- Malachy McCourt (1931–2024), Irish-American actor, writer and politician
- Malachy McGurran (1938–1978), Irish republican
- Malachy Ó Caollaidhe (d. 1645), Irish Catholic archbishop
- Malachy Ikechukwu Okwueze (born 1962), Nigerian professor of religion and ethics
- Malachy O'Rourke, Irish Gaelic footballer and manager
- Malachy Postlethwayt (1707–1767), British economist and lexicographer
- Malachy Salter (1715–1781), Nova Scotian merchant and office-holder convicted of sedition
- Malachy Sheridan (1966–2002), Irish bobsledder
- Malachy Sullivan (1893–1967), American Catholic priest, collegiate instructor, and football coach
- Malachy Tallack (born 1980), Shetland singer-songwriter, journalist and author
- Malachy Travers, Irish hurler

== Fictional characters ==
- Malachy Costello, from the Irish soap opera Fair City
- Malachy Fisher, from the British soap opera Hollyoaks
- Malachy Malone, from the American soap opera Ryan's Hope

== Dogs ==
- Palacegarden Malachy, winner of the 2012 Westminster Kennel Club Dog Show
