= Bob Walsh (American football) =

American football player and coach

Robert Walsh
Biographical details
- Born: c. 1919

Playing career
- 1941: Notre Dame
- Position: Guard

Coaching career (HC unless noted)
- 1942: Notre Dame (freshmen line)
- 1948–1949: St. Benedict's
- 1950: Toledo (assistant)

Head coaching record
- Overall: 4–14

Robert M. Walsh (c. 1919 – ?) was an American football coach. He was the head football coach at St. Benedict's College—now known as Benedictine College—in Atchison, Kansas from 1948 to 1949, compiling a record of 4–14. In 1950, Walsh was hired as an assistant football coach at the University of Toledo to serve under head coach Bob Snyder. Walsh played college football at the University of Notre Dame as a guard, lettering in 1941. He spent one season as freshman line coach at Notre Dame, in 1942, before he was commissioned into the United States Navy in January 1943. Walsh was hired in 1946 as the athletic director at Parks Air College—now known as Parks College of Engineering, Aviation and Technology in St. Louis, Missouri.

== Head coaching record ==
Year	Team	Overall	Conference	Standing	Bowl/playoffs
St. Benedict's Ravens (Central Intercollegiate Conference) (1948–1949)
1948	St. Benedict's	0–9	0–5	6th	
1949	St. Benedict's	4–5	2–4	5th	
St. Benedict's:		4–14	2–9		
Total:		4–14			
