= Leo Deutsch (American football) =

American football coach

Coaching career (HC unless noted)
- 1950–1952: St. Benedict's (KS)

Head coaching record
- Overall: 13–13–1 (.500)

Accomplishments and honors

Awards
- As a player: First-team Little All-American (1936)

Leo Deutsch was an American football coach. He served as the head football coach at St. Benedict's College—now known as Benedictine College—in Atchison, Kansas for three seasons, from 1950 to 1952, compiling a record of 13–13–1.

== Head coaching record ==
Year	Team	Overall	Conference	Standing	Bowl/playoffs
St. Benedict's Ravens (Central Intercollegiate Conference) (1950–1952)
1950	St. Benedict's	4–4–1	1–3–1	4th	
1951	St. Benedict's	4–5	2–3	T–4th	
1952	St. Benedict's	5–4	3–2	T–2nd	
St. Benedict's:		13–13–1	6–8–1		
Total:		13–13–1			
