= Robert Schmidt =

Robert Schmidt may refer to:

- Robert Franz Schmidt (1932–2017), German physiologist and professor emeritus
- Robert Hans Schmidt (died 1962), general director of Ford Germany
- Robert Schmidt (bobsleigh), bobsledder who competed in the early 1930s
- Robert Schmidt (German politician) (1864–1943), leader in the Weimar Republic in the late 1910s and early 1920s
- Robert Schmidt (actor) (1882–1941), Danish actor
- Robert Schmidt (American football), American football coach in the United States
- Robert Schmidt (American politician) (1913–1988), American politician in Wisconsin

== See also ==
- Bob Schmidt (disambiguation)
