= Benedictine University at Springfield =

Catholic college in Springfield, Illinois, US

Coordinates: 39°49′12″N 89°38′42″W

- Former names: Springfield Junior College (1929–1967); Springfield College in Illinois (1967–2003)
- Type: Catholic; Private
- Active: 1929–2018
- Academic affiliations: Benedictine University, Association of Benedictine Colleges and Universities
- Location: Springfield, Illinois, U.S.
- Campus: Suburban, 25 acres (10 ha)
- Website: www.ben.edu/springfield-campus

Benedictine University at Springfield in Springfield, Illinois was a branch campus of Benedictine University, whose main campus is in Lisle, Illinois. It offered accelerated associate, bachelor's and graduate programs through the university's School of Graduate, Adult and Professional Education.

SGAPE offered accelerated undergraduate programs in Management, Criminal Justice, Psychology and Nursing; graduate programs in Reading and Literacy, Business Administration, and Management and Organizational Behavior; English as a Second Language and Bilingual Endorsements; and a Ph.D. in Organization Development.

BenU at Springfield also offered fully online undergraduate certificates in Human Resource Management, Marketing, Digital Marketing for the Working Professional, Advanced Digital Marketing for the Working Professional, and Diversity and Criminology.

On-campus programs met one night a week; and hybrid/off campus programs had some classes that met one night a week at off campus locations (including partnership programs that are held at local worksites) and other classes that were offered online.

Programs were specifically designed for adult learners to develop essential problem-solving and critical thinking skills.

== History ==
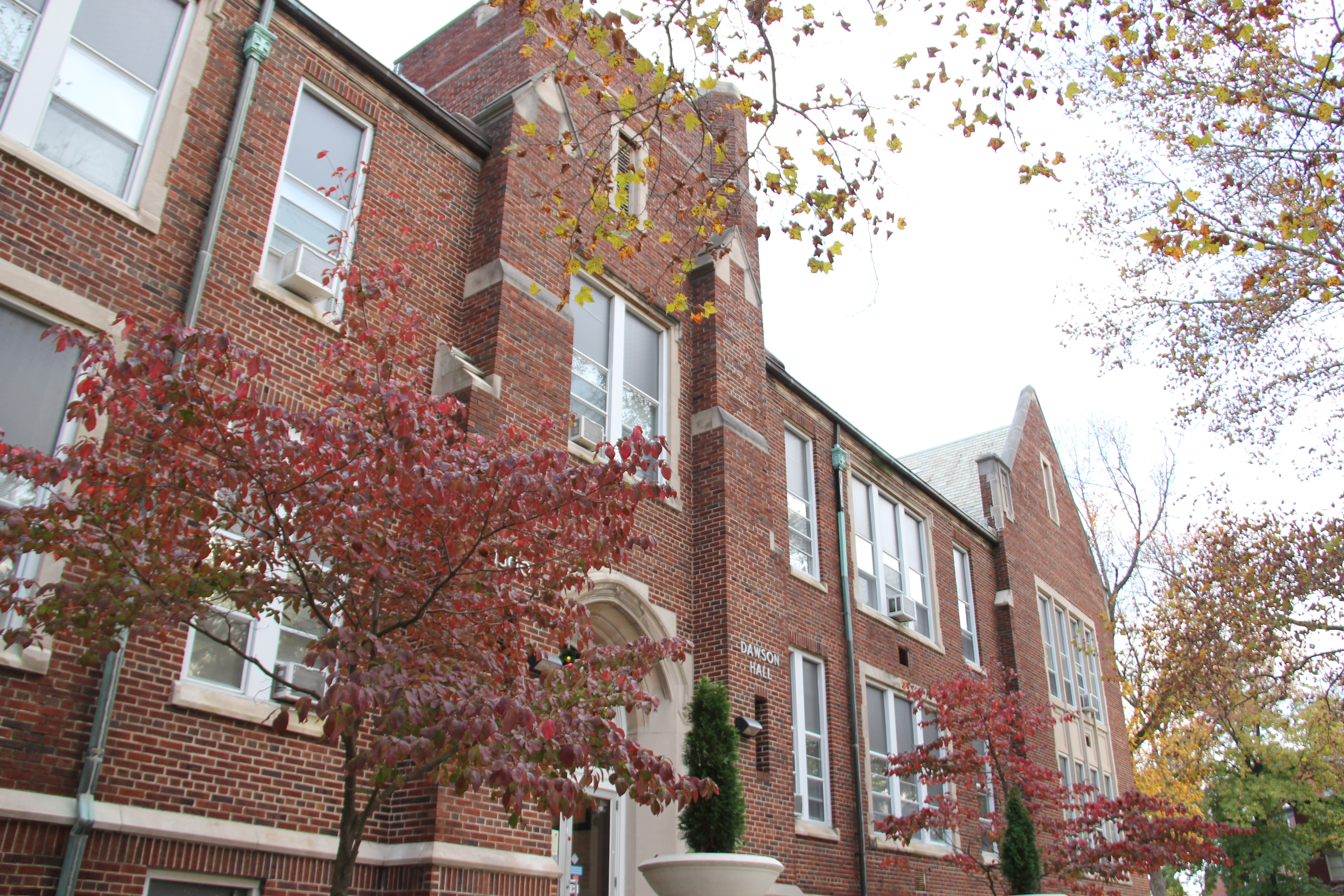
Benedictine University at Springfield

Benedictine University at Springfield has its roots in the founding of Springfield Junior College (later to become Springfield College in Illinois) in 1929 by the Ursuline Sisters. In 2003, the school faced financial and enrollment challenges and Benedictine undertook steps to support it. First established as a “cooperative venture” with Springfield College in Illinois (SCI), Benedictine's affiliation with the college soon grew into a “permanent partnership,” as recognized by the Board of Trustees of both institutions in 2004.

From that point forward, the university provided administrative, financial and leadership support to SCI, while also developing the university's own academic programs offered on the SCI campus. As required by regulatory and accreditation standards for a junior college, the academic programs the university offered in Springfield were “2+2” programs (consisting of the third and fourth years of four-year bachelor's degree programs), programs leading to master's degrees, and a doctoral program. However, these standards did not allow Benedictine to offer any full, four-year degree programs in Springfield.

Although SCI continued to offer programs for an associate degree, the financial and enrollment challenges confronting SCI continued to mount. In 2008 and 2009, Benedictine consulted with the regulatory and accreditation agencies to identify the most appropriate means of facilitating the university's continued growth in Springfield, while also resolving SCI's difficulties. The solution identified was that Benedictine should establish a branch campus in Springfield, physically located on the SCI campus, and obtain the necessary approvals to offer full, four-year bachelor's degree programs. The first two years of these four-year programs would supplant the associate degree programs which SCI offered.

In keeping with the affiliation of the two institutions, SCI amended its corporate by-laws such that the authority to make the most significant decisions was reserved for the Benedictine Board of Trustees. Therefore, in October 2009, the SCI Board of Trustees approved a recommendation to Benedictine's board to close SCI's academic programs and complete SCI's business affairs as a junior college. The SCI board's action recognized that the interests of SCI's “students, faculty and staff” would “best be accommodated” by these steps and that “winding down of the College’s programs in an orderly closure process” should be “coordinated with the development and expansion of the University’s educational programs and administrative activities in Springfield.”

Also in 2009, the Illinois Board of Higher Education granted approval to Benedictine to offer six new bachelor's degree programs in Springfield. Then in early 2010, the Higher Learning Commission of the North Central Association of Colleges and Schools granted recognition to Benedictine's overall presence in Springfield as a branch campus of the university to be known as “Benedictine University at Springfield.”

Springfield College in Illinois had many challenges over the years including increasing competition for a finite market of students, a history of low enrollments and a crumbling physical infrastructure. When Benedictine entered the market, junior, senior and graduate programs were added and enrollment began to climb.

However, enrollment did not continue to rise, and it was estimated that $40 million in major capital improvements would be needed to make the buildings competitive with other institutions. The Benedictine Board of Trustees deemed that number was untenable and continued operation was unsustainable, and on October 23, 2014, the university announced that it would discontinue its undergraduate program for traditional students ages 18–22 at the end of May 2015 and transition to exclusively serving the area's adult undergraduate and graduate student population.

Benedictine worked with the Illinois Board of Higher Education to develop a “completion program” to ensure junior and senior students would be able to earn their bachelor's degree at Benedictine University in Springfield. Benedictine also assisted freshman and sophomores as they explored opportunities to continue their education elsewhere.

The final Benedictine University in Springfield traditional undergraduate students earned their degrees in August 2016.

== Campus ==
Since announcing that the Springfield branch campus would focus on the area's adult undergraduate and graduate student population, the university has restructured and repurposed office space and built facilities to better serve current students. Angela Hall now serves as the site of the Springfield campus’ Commencement exercises while providing gymnasium space for Good Guides, a Land of Lincoln Goodwill Industries program, to conduct basketball practice. The stately, restored Brinkerhoff Home, built in 1869 and the oldest building on campus, houses adult admission offices, other supporting faculty offices and a conference room on the main floor. The first floor of the Brinkerhoff Home is reserved for social receptions and meetings. Administrative offices and library space occupy the main floor of the Charles E. Becker Library building, while the lower-level houses an auditorium and computer labs.

The university sold one of its non-contiguous properties, the Eighth Street gym, located at 1401 North Eighth St., in October 2015. Built in 1935, the gym was used for volleyball games and as a practice facility for other sports. It was sold to a local gym owner who renovated it and opened it as a secondary location.

At the conclusion of the 2018 spring semester, courses will no longer be taught on the Benedictine University Springfield branch campus. Adult degree-completion and graduate students will attend classes at employer-based and community locations. The Springfield-area locations provide students with accessible, comfortable and equipped-for-teaching classrooms.

== Athletics ==
The athletic teams at the Springfield campus were called the Bulldogs. The campus was a member of the National Association of Intercollegiate Athletics (NAIA), primarily competing the American Midwest Conference from 2011–12 to 2014–15 (when the campus dropped its athletics program).

Benedictine–Springfield competed in 14 intercollegiate athletic programs: Men's sports included baseball, basketball, cross country, distance track, golf and soccer; while women's sports included basketball, cross country, distance track, golf, soccer, softball and volleyball; and co-ed sports included cheerleading.

== Notable alumni ==
- Carrie Johnson, NPR Justice Department correspondent
