= Michael Carroll (American football) =

American football coach

Coaching career (HC unless noted)
- 1942: St. Benedict's

Head coaching record
- Overall: 6–2

Michael Carroll was an American football coach. He served as the head football coach at St. Benedict's College—now known as Benedictine College—in Atchinson, Kansas, serving for one season, in 1942, and compiling a record of 6–2.

== Head coaching record ==
Year	Team	Overall	Conference	Standing	Bowl/playoffs
St. Benedict's Ravens (Central Intercollegiate Conference) (1942)
1942	St. Benedict's	6–2	4–1	2nd	
St. Benedict's:		6–2	4–1		
Total:		6–2			
