= Matt May =

American football player, coach, and administrator (1935–2010)

Biographical details
- Born: October 27, 1935
- Died: November 28, 2010 (aged 75); Andale, Kansas, U.S.

Coaching career (HC unless noted)
- 1958–1960: Saints Peter and Paul HS (KS)
- 1961–1964: Hayden HS (KS)
- 1965–1976: St. Mary of the Plains
- 1977–1978: Benedictine

Head coaching record
- Overall: 63–68–3 (college); 34–28–1 (high school)
- Bowls: 0–3

Accomplishments and honors

Championships
- 2 KCAC (1973, 1975); KCAC South Division (1969–1970)

Mathew F. May (October 27, 1935 – November 28, 2010) was an American football player, coach, and college athletics administrator.

== Playing career ==
May played college football at St. Benedict's College—now known as Benedictine College—in Atchison, Kansas.

== Coaching career ==
May was an instructor, athletic director, and head football coach at Benedictine College. He held that position for the 1977 and 1978 seasons. His coaching record at Benedictine was 10–10.

== Head coaching record ==
=== College ===
| Year | Team | Overall | Conference | Standing | Bowl/playoffs |
|---|---|---|---|---|---|
St. Mary of the Plains Cavaliers (NAIA independent) (1965–1968)
| 1965 | St. Mary of the Plains | 0–9 | | | |
| 1966 | St. Mary of the Plains | 2–7 | | | |
| 1967 | St. Mary of the Plains | 2–5–2 | | | |
| 1968 | St. Mary of the Plains | 6–4 | | | |
St. Mary of the Plains Cavaliers (Kansas Collegiate Athletic Conference) (1969–1976)
| 1969 | St. Mary of the Plains | 7–2 | 5–0 | 1st (South) | |
| 1970 | St. Mary of the Plains | 5–5 | 4–1 | 1st (South) | |
| 1971 | St. Mary of the Plains | 2–7–1 | 2–5–1 | 7th | |
| 1972 | St. Mary of the Plains | 5–4 | 5–3 | 3rd | |
| 1973 | St. Mary of the Plains | 7–3 | 7–1 | T–1st | L Mineral Water |
| 1974 | St. Mary of the Plains | 6–4 | 5–3 | T–2nd | |
| 1975 | St. Mary of the Plains | 8–2 | 7–1 | 1st | L Boot Hill |
| 1976 | St. Mary of the Plains | 3–6 | 3–5 | 7th | |
| St. Mary of the Plains: | | 53–58–3 | 38–19–1 | | |
Benedictine Ravens (NAIA Division II independent) (1977–1978)
| 1977 | Benedictine | 7–4 | | | L Boot Hill |
| 1978 | Benedictine | 3–6 | | | |
| Benedictine: | | 10–10 | | | |
| Total: | | 63–68–3 | | | |
National championship Conference title Conference division title or championship game berth
