= Larry Wilcox Stadium =

Soccer Stadium

Coordinates: 39°34′37.2″N 95°6′45.6″W

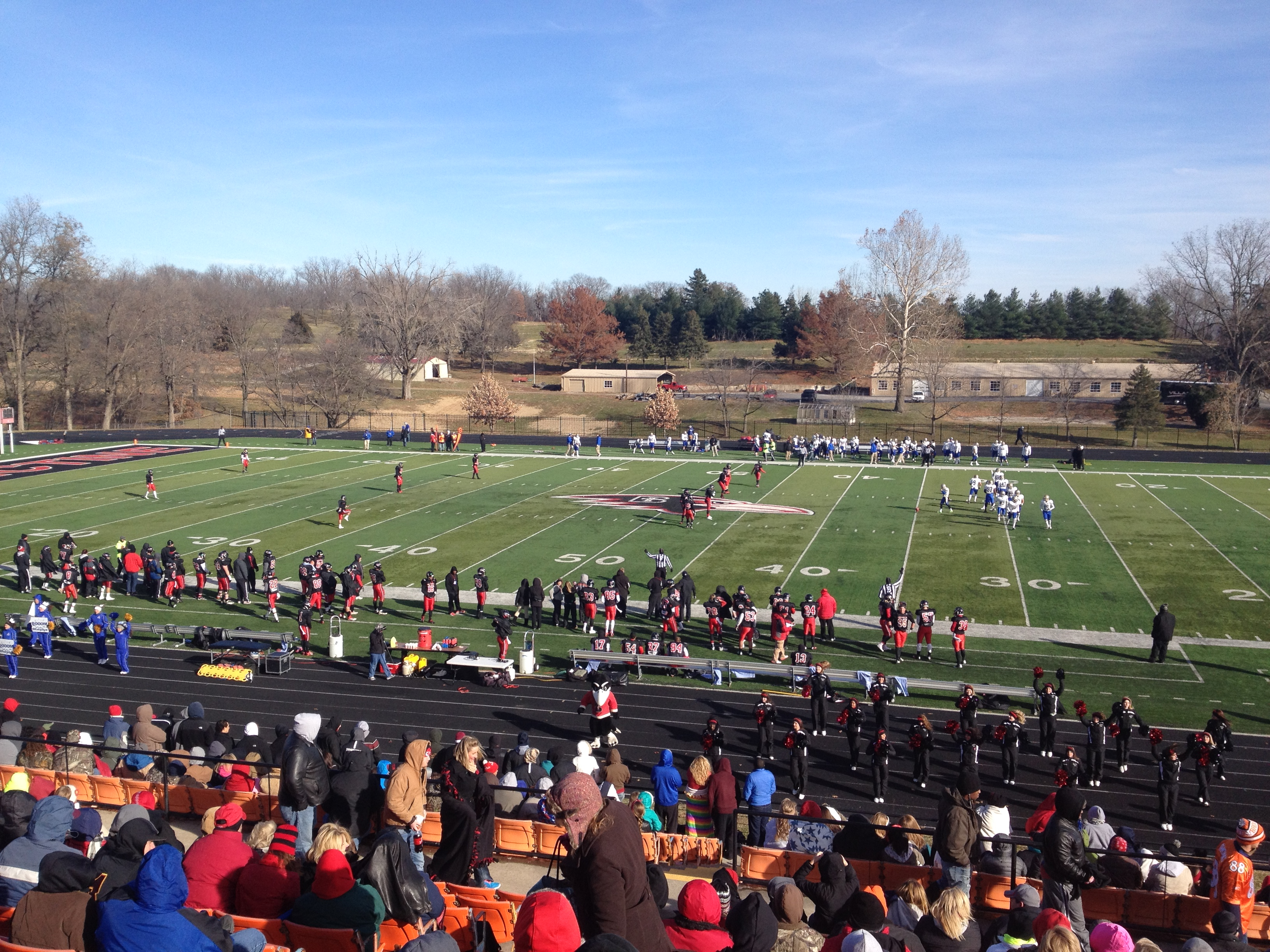
- Interactive map of Larry Wilcox Stadium
- Former names: Raven Stadium
- Location: Atchison, Kansas
- Owner: Benedictine College
- Operator: Benedictine Ravens
- Surface: Field Turf

Tenant
- Benedictine Ravens

Larry Wilcox Stadium is a sport stadium in Atchison, Kansas, United States. The facility is primarily used by Benedictine College for college football, track and field. It is also host to other university and city athletic and non-athletic events including local high school football games.

The stadium was named for then-current Benedictine football coach and former athletic director Larry Wilcox. The facility has hosted multiple National Association of Intercollegiate Athletics football playoff games during its use.
