= Larry Quigley =

American football coach (1891–1956)

Biographical details
- Born: March 17, 1891; Atchison, Kansas, U.S.
- Died: June 17, 1956 (aged 65); Little Rock, Arkansas, U.S.

Coaching career (HC unless noted)
- 1915: Arkansas College
- 1916: Little Rock
- 1919–1920: Kansas Wesleyan
- 1922–1927: St. Benedict's

Head coaching record
- Overall: 25–30–8

Lawrence Joseph Quigley (March 17, 1891 – June 17, 1956) was an American football coach. He was the head football at coach at St. Benedict's College—now known as Benedictine College—in Atchison, Kansas. He held that position for six seasons, from 1922 until 1927. His coaching record at Benedictine was 22–20–5.

Quigley served for one season as the head coach at Lyon College (then known as Arkansas College) in 1915.

During the 1916 football season, Quigley coached at Little Rock College, a Catholic school in Little Rock, Arkansas. At a time when anti-Catholic sentiment was high in Arkansas, the team faced stern challenges, notably following a win against Arkansas Tech in which irate fans harassed the team on their trip back to the train station.

From 1919 to 1920, Quigley served as the head coach at Kansas Wesleyan University, posting a record of 3–10–3.

Quigley died in 1956 in a hospital in Little Rock, Arkansas after a serious illness of a month. He was the brother of Ernest C. Quigley.
