= Malachy Ikechukwu Okwueze =

Nigerian Professor

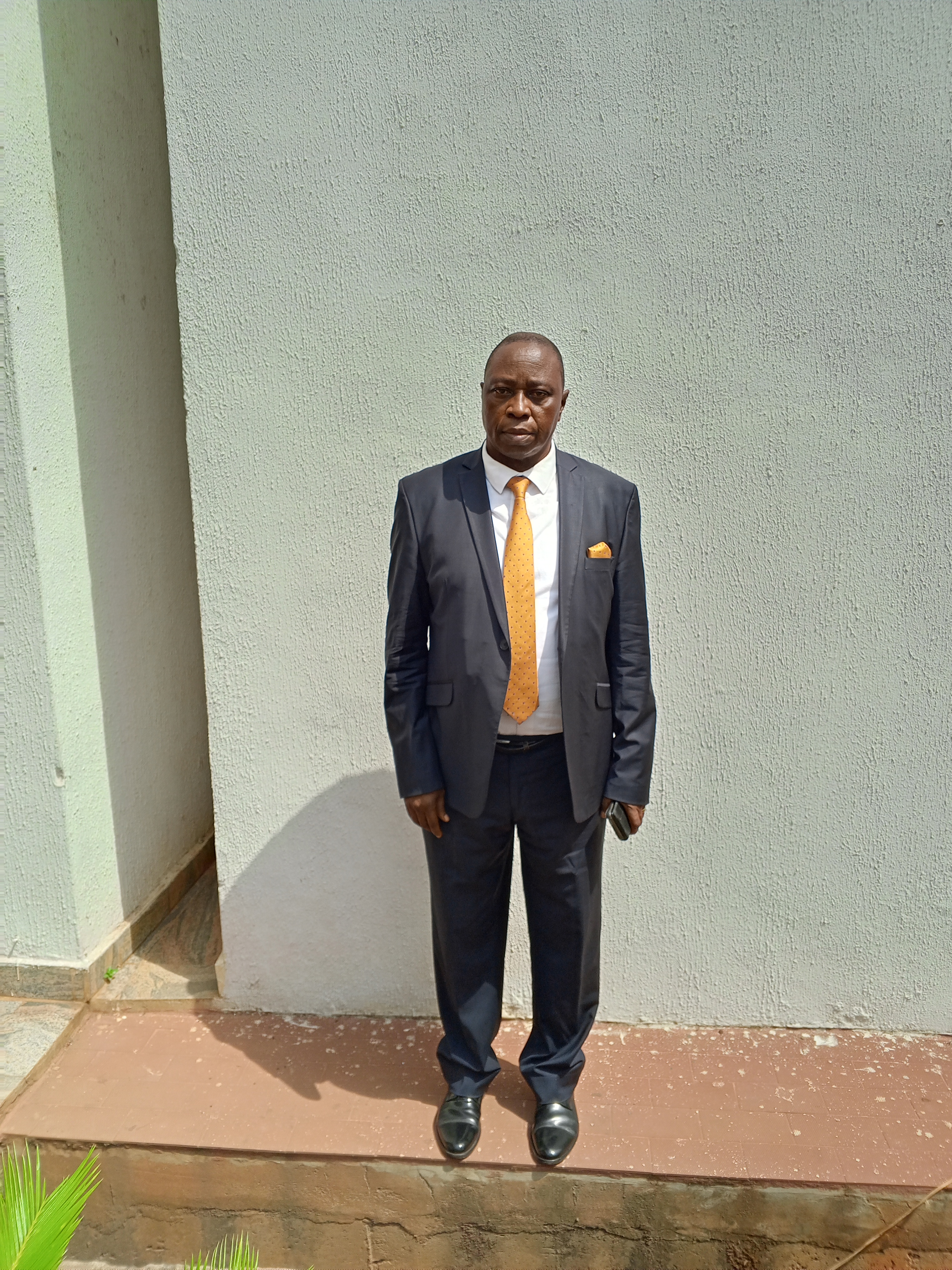
- Citizenship: Nigerian

Malachy Ikechukwu Okwueze (May 30, 1962) is a Nigerian professor of Religion and Ethics, in the Department of Religion and Cultural Studies, University of Nigeria, Nsukka. He was the first vice chancellor of the Coal City University between 2016 and 2020.

== Early life and education ==
Okwueze was born on May 30, 1962, in Nsukka. He obtained primary and post-primary education at Anglican Grammar School, currently referred to a Nsukka High School, in Nsukka Local Government Area of Enugu State, Nigeria.

After passing his West African School Certificate Examination in Division One, Okwueze went to the University of Nigeria, Nsukka, where he obtained a First Class Honours bachelor's degree in Religion. He was the Best Graduating Student of the University of Nigeria in 1987. He obtained his master's degree in 1989, and earned a PhD in Religion in 1995, all from the University of Nigeria, Nsukka respectively. He also obtained an LL.B Degree in Law from the University of Nigeria, Enugu Campus (UNEC) and was the Best Graduating Student in Commercial Law in 1992. Okwueze was called to the Nigerian Bar in 1996 at the Nigerian Law School, Lagos. He graduated as the Second Best overall Graduating Student of the Nigerian Law School, Lagos in 1996.

== Career ==
Okwueze is the director of legal service, Society for Research and Academic Excellence, University of Nigeria, Nsukka.

He was the first vice chancellor of Coal City University between 2016 and 2020, and the former deputy chief of staff to the Enugu State Government under the administration of former Governor Lawrence Ifeanyi Ugwuanyi. Okwueze has also served as the deputy vice chancellor (Administration), University of Nigeria Nsukka, from 2012 to 2014; dean, Student Affairs, University of Nigeria, Nsukka; head, Department of Religion and Cultural Studies, University of Nigeria, Nsukka; and chairman, Nigerian Bar Association, Nsukka Branch.

Okwueze is a member of the editorial board of Nsukka Journal of Religion and Cultural Studies (NJRCS).

He also served as a member of one of the 12 sectoral ad hoc committees instituted by the Enugu State Government, for reform of public service in the state, under the administration of Governor Ifeanyi Ugwuanyi.

He was succeeded by Professor Afam Icha-Ituma as the vice chancellor of Coal City University.

== Selected publications ==
- Okwueze, M.I.& Ononogbu, D.C. (2003). The Church and Entrepreneurship–Hope for the Youth in Nigeria
- Okwueze, M.I. (2003). Ethics Religion and Society: Biblical, Traditional and Contemporary Perspectives
- Okwueze, M.I. (2019). Religion, culture and secularism: Beyond the Western paradigm
- Okwueze, M.I. (2004). Religion and societal development: Contemporary Nigerian perspectives
