= Coal City University =

Private university in Enugu, Nigeria

Coordinates: 6.46243°N 7.58458°E

- Type: Private University
- Established: 2016
- Chancellor: Chinedu Anih
- Vice-Chancellor: Afam Icha-Ituma
- Location: Enugu, Nigeria
- Website: ccu.edu.ng

Coal City University (CCU) is a private, non-profit co-educational university in Nigeria. It is located in the city of Enugu, the capital and largest city of Enugu State, Nigeria.

The university has two campuses—one at Emene and the other at Independence Layout, and spread over 432 acres of land. The university currently has over 800 students in its 10 faculties, which were established in 2016.

== Faculties ==
- Natural and Applied Sciences
- Faculty of Education
- Faculty of Art, Social and Management Sciences

=== List of courses in CCU ===
Coal City University (CCU) is one of the confidential universities in Nigeria that offers assorted undergraduate programs. The university is situated in Enugu, Enugu State.

Coal City University (CCU) has been authoritatively certified and additionally perceived by the National University Commission (NUC), Nigeria. The Social Science and Political Science programmes were given full accreditation by NUC in 2024 with a score of 84.40%. The letter to that effect was dated 10–12 December 2024.

The following are the courses offered at the Coal City University (CCU).

- Accounting
- Biochemistry
- Biology
- Business administration
- Business education
- Chemistry
- Computer science
- Criminology and security studies
- Early childhood education
- Economics
- Education and biology
- Education and chemistry:
- Education and computer science
- Education and economics
- Education and English
- Education and history:
- Education and integrated science:
- Education and mathematics
- Education and physics
- Education and political science
- Education and religious studies
- Education and social studies
- Educational management
- English and literary studies
- Guidance and counselling
- History and diplomatic studies
- International lation
- Marketing
- Mass communication
- Mathematics
- Microbiology
- Physics
- Political science
- Primary education studies
- Psychology
- Public administration
- Religious studies
- Sociology
- Statistics
- Taxation
- Teacher education science
