= List of Benedictine colleges and universities =

The following is a list of colleges and universities founded or operated by the Benedictines within the United States.

== Institutions ==
School	City	State	Enrollment	Founded
Belmont Abbey College	Belmont	North Carolina	1,320	1876
Benedictine College	Atchison	Kansas	1,855	1858
Benedictine University	Lisle	Illinois	6,857	1887
Benedictine University at Mesa	Mesa	Arizona	300	2013
Benedictine University at Springfield	Springfield	Illinois	981	1929
Conception Seminary College	Conception	Missouri	108	1886
University of Mary	Bismarck	North Dakota	2,900	1959
Mount Angel Seminary	St. Benedict, Oregon	Oregon	170	1889
Mount Marty University	Yankton	South Dakota	1,100	1936
Saint Anselm College	Goffstown	New Hampshire	2,000	1889
College of Saint Benedict	St. Joseph	Minnesota	2,042	1913
Saint Gregory's University	Shawnee	Oklahoma	800	1875
Saint John's University	Collegeville	Minnesota	1,886	1857
Saint Joseph Seminary College	Covington	Louisiana	171	1889
Saint Leo University	Saint Leo	Florida	1,628	1889
Saint Martin's University	Lacey	Washington	1,650	1895
Saint Meinrad Seminary & School of Theology	St. Meinrad	Indiana	252	1854
College of St. Scholastica	Duluth	Minnesota	3,309	1912
Saint Vincent College	Latrobe	Pennsylvania	1,848	1846
Thomas More University	Crestview Hills	Kentucky	1,500	1921

== A closer look ==
=== Belmont Abbey College ===
- Belmont Abbey College is a private liberal arts Catholic college located near Charlotte, North Carolina. It is also a Benedictine monastery of the same name.

=== Benedictine College ===
- Benedictine College is a co-educational university.

=== Benedictine University at Lisle ===
- Benedictine University at Lisle is a private Roman Catholic university.

==== Benedictine University at Springfield ====
- A branch campus, Benedictine University at Springfield, formerly known as Springfield College in Illinois (SCI) or Springfield College, is focused on adult learners.

==== Benedictine University at Mesa ====
- Is a branch campus in Mesa, Arizona. It is a co-educational liberal arts university and offers undergraduate and graduate degrees grounded in Benedictine values. It is the only Catholic liberal arts college in the Southwest.

=== College of Saint Benedict ===
- The College of Saint Benedict (CSB), for women, and Saint John's University (SJU), for men, are partnered liberal arts colleges.

=== College of Saint Scholastica ===
- The College of Saint Scholastica is a private college with its main campus located in Duluth.

=== Conception Seminary College ===
- Conception Abbey is a monastery of the Swiss-American Congregation of the Benedictine Confederation.

=== Mount Angel Seminary ===
- Mount Angel Seminary comprises a Graduate School of Theology, a College of Liberal Arts, and a Pre-Theology program for Seminarians.

=== Mount Marty University ===
- Mount Marty University is an American academic community in the Roman Catholic Benedictine liberal arts tradition.

=== Saint Anselm College ===
- Saint Anselm College is a nationally ranked, Catholic, Benedictine, liberal arts college.

=== Saint John's University ===
- The College of Saint Benedict (CSB), for women, and Saint John's University (SJU), for men, are partnered liberal arts colleges.

=== Saint Joseph Seminary College ===
- Saint Joseph Seminary College, also known as St. Ben or St. Ben's, is a private four-year seminary college.

=== Saint Leo University ===
- Saint Leo University is a private, non-profit, Roman Catholic liberal arts university.

=== Saint Martin's University ===
- Saint Martin's University (formerly Saint Martin's College) is a coeducational, Catholic, liberal arts university.

=== Saint Vincent College ===
- Saint Vincent College is a four-year, coeducational, Roman Catholic, Benedictine, liberal arts college.

=== Thomas More University ===
- Thomas More University, historically a liberal arts college, was founded in 1921 as the all-women's Villa Madonna College in Covington, Kentucky, across the Ohio River from Cincinnati, by Covington's Benedictine Sisters. The school became coeducational in 1945, and moved to a new campus in the nearby suburb of Crestview Hills, Kentucky in 1968, at which time it was renamed Thomas More College. It adopted its current name in 2018, shortly after Kentucky's higher education council granted it university status; this coincided with plans to add select postgraduate degree programs.

=== University of Mary ===
- The University of Mary (abbreviated U-Mary) is a four-year Catholic university.
