= Robert Schmidt (American football) =

American football coach

Coaching career (HC unless noted)
- 1928–1931: St. Benedict's

Head coaching record
- Overall: 10–20–3

Robert W. Schmidt was an American football coach. He was the head football coach at St. Benedict's College—now known as Benedictine College—in Atchison, Kansas. He held that position for four seasons, from 1928 until 1931. His coaching record at Benedictine was 10–20–3.
