= Mickey Kobrosky =

American football player (1915–2003)

No. 10
- Position: Back

Personal information
- Born: February 22, 1915; Springfield, Massachusetts, U.S.
- Died: May 29, 2003 (aged 88); Longmeadow, Massachusetts, U.S.
- Listed height: 6 ft 0 in (1.83 m)
- Listed weight: 187 lb (85 kg)

Career information
- High school: Springfield Central
- College: Trinity (CT) (1933–1936)
- NFL draft: 1937: 5th round, 44th overall pick

Career history
- New York Giants (1937)

Awards and highlights
- 2× First-team Little All-American (1935, 1936)

Career NFL statistics
- Passing attempts: 13
- Passing completions: 2
- Passing yards: 18
- Rushing attempts: 13
- Rushing yards: 41
- Stats at Pro Football Reference
- College Football Hall of Fame

Milton Leonard "Mickey" Kobrosky (February 22, 1915 – May 29, 2003) was an American professional football player. He played quarterback collegiately for Trinity College. He was selected in the fifth round of the 1937 NFL draft with the 44th overall pick. He played one season in the National Football League (NFL) for the New York Giants.

Kobrosky was posthumously elected to the College Football Hall of Fame in 2011.
