= Bob Schmidt =

Bob Schmidt may refer to:

- Bob Schmidt (American football) (born 1936), former American football offensive tackle
- Bob Schmidt (Australian footballer) (born 1943), Australian rules footballer, member of the South Adelaide Football Club's official "Greatest Team"
- Bob Schmidt (baseball) (1933–2015), former baseball catcher
- Bob Schmidt (musician) (born 1968), American multi-instrumentalist and songwriter with Flogging Molly

== See also ==
- Robert Schmidt (disambiguation)
