= Larry Wilcox (American football) =

American football coach

Playing career
- 1970–1973: Benedictine (KS)
- Position: Defensive tackle

Coaching career (HC unless noted)
- 1974–1978: Benedictine (KS) (line)
- 1979–2020: Benedictine (KS)

Head coaching record
- Overall: 305–153
- Bowls: 1–1
- Tournaments: 7–14 (NAIA playoffs)

Accomplishments and honors

Championships
- 6 HAAC (1992, 1995, 1997–1998, 2000, 2013); 2 HAAC North Division (2017–2018)

Larry Wilcox is an American former college football coach. He served as the head football coach at Benedictine College in Atchison, Kansas from 1979 to 2020, compiling a record of 305–153. Before the beginning of the 2011 season, he was the coach with the third most victories in the National Association of Intercollegiate Athletics. On October 18, 2014, Wilcox became the fourth NAIA football coach to reach 250 career victories in the Ravens' 49–6 win over Peru State.

== Head coaching record ==
Year	Team	Overall	Conference	Standing	Bowl/playoffs	NAIA^{#}
Benedictine Ravens (NAIA Division II independent) (1979–1987)
1979	Benedictine	2–8				
1980	Benedictine	3–7				
1981	Benedictine	4–6				
1982	Benedictine	6–4				
1983	Benedictine	6–4				
1984	Benedictine	6–4				
1985	Benedictine	10–1			L NAIA Division II Quarterfinal	
1986	Benedictine	7–3			L Sunflower	
1987	Benedictine	4–7				
Benedictine Ravens (Tri-State Athletic Conference) (1988–1990)
1988	Benedictine	7–3	2–1	2nd		
1989	Benedictine	6–4	1–2	3rd		
1990	Benedictine	4–6	0–3	4th		
Benedictine Ravens (NAIA Division II independent) (1991)
1991	Benedictine	8–3			W Steamboat	
Benedictine Ravens (Heart of America Athletic Conference) (1992–present)
1992	Benedictine	11–2	7–1	T–1st	L NAIA Division II Semifinal	
1993	Benedictine	6–3	5–3	T–4th		
1994	Benedictine	7–3	6–2	T–2nd		
1995	Benedictine	9–1	8–0	1st	L NAIA Division II First Round	
1996	Benedictine	8–3	7–2	T–2nd	L NAIA Division II First Round	
1997	Benedictine	9–2	8–1	T–1st	L NAIA First Round	
1998	Benedictine	9–2	8–1	1st	L NAIA First Round	5
1999	Benedictine	5–5	4–5	7th		
2000	Benedictine	10–1	9–0	1st	L NAIA First Round	9
2001	Benedictine	12–2	9–1	2nd	L NAIA Semifinal	4
2002	Benedictine	9–3	8–2	T–2nd	L NAIA First Round	12
2003	Benedictine	9–3	9–1	2nd	L NAIA First Round	12
2004	Benedictine	5–6	5–5	T–4th		
2005	Benedictine	6–4	6–4	T–5th		
2006	Benedictine	8–3	7–3	T–2nd		18
2007	Benedictine	4–7	3–7	8th		
2008	Benedictine	7–4	6–4	5th		
2009	Benedictine	6–5	5–5	6th		
2010	Benedictine	7–4	6–4	5th		
2011	Benedictine	9–3	7–2	3rd	L NAIA First Round	13
2012	Benedictine	7–4	5–4	5th		22
2013	Benedictine	10–2	8–1	T–1st	L NAIA First Round	11
2014	Benedictine	7–3	6–2	2nd		25
2015	Benedictine	7–4	3–2	T–2nd (North)		21
2016	Benedictine	7–4	3–2	T–3rd (North)		23
2017	Benedictine	9–3	4–1	T–1st (North)	L NAIA First Round	15
2018	Benedictine	13–2	5–0	T–1st (North)	L NAIA Championship	2
2019	Benedictine	8–3	3–2	T–2nd (South)		18
2020–21	Benedictine	7–2	4–1	2nd (South)		
Benedictine:		305–153	177–74			
Total:		305–153				
National championship Conference title Conference division title or championship game berth
^{#}Rankings from final NAIA Coaches' Poll.

== See also ==
- List of college football career coaching wins leaders
- Larry Wilcox Stadium
