= 1936 Little All-America college football team =

American college football all-star team

The 1936 Little All-America college football team is composed of college football players from small colleges and universities who were selected by the Associated Press (AP) as the best players at each position. For 1936, the AP did not select a second team but instead chose multiple players for "honorable mention" at each position.

== Selections ==
Position	Player	Team
QB	Douglas Locke	St. Mary's (TX)
HB	Dick Riffle	Albright
HB	Mickey Kobrosky	Trinity (CT)
FB	Richard Wesiberger	Willamette
E	Henry Hammond	Southwestern (TN)
E	Leo Deutsch	St. Benedict's (KS)
T	George Mike	West Virginia Wesleyan
T	Ralph Niehaus	Dayton
G	Doug Oldershaw	Santa Barbara State
G	George Anderson	Middlebury
C	Norman Cooper	Howard (AL)

== See also ==
- 1936 College Football All-America Team
