= Malachy Sullivan =

American Roman Catholic priest, collegiate instructor, and football coach

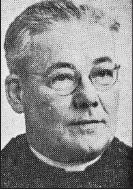

Biographical details
- Born: August 21, 1893; Lincoln, Nebraska, U.S.
- Died: July 24, 1967 (aged 73); Great Falls, Montana, U.S.

Coaching career (HC unless noted)
- 1920–1921: St. Benedict's

Head coaching record
- Overall: 8–6

Malachy Robert Sullivan O.S.B. (August 21, 1893 – July 24, 1967) was an American Roman Catholic priest, collegiate instructor, and football coach.

== Coaching career ==
Sullivan was the first head football coach at St. Benedict's College—now known as Benedictine College—in Atchison, Kansas. He held that position for the 1920 and 1921 seasons. His coaching record at Benedictine was 8–6.

== Death ==
Sullivan died of a heart attack in 1967.
