= Ernest C. Quigley =

American sports official (1880–1960)

Biographical details
- Born: March 22, 1880; Newcastle, New Brunswick, Canada
- Died: December 10, 1960 (aged 80); Lawrence, Kansas, U.S.
- Education: University of Kansas

Coaching career (HC unless noted)

Football
- 1900–1901: Warrensburg Teachers
- 1903–1911: St. Mary's (KS)
- 1918: Saint Louis

Administrative career (AD unless noted)
- 1944–1950: Kansas
- Basketball Hall of Fame; Inducted in 1961 (profile)

Baseball career
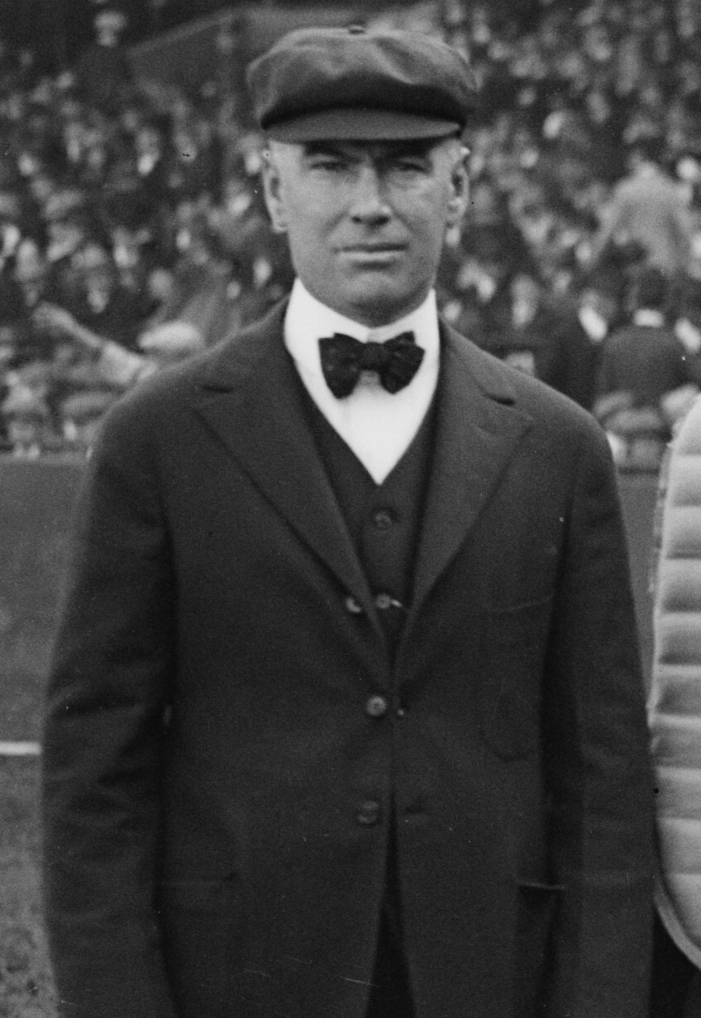
- Quigley umpiring at the 1916 World Series

debut
- June 25, 1913

Last appearance
- September 18, 1938

Career highlights and awards
- World Series (1916, 1919, 1921, 1924, 1927, 1935)

Member of the Canadian

Baseball Hall of Fame
- Induction: 2021

Ernest Cosmos Quigley (March 22, 1880 – December 10, 1960) was a Canadian-born American sports official who became notable both as a basketball referee and as an umpire in Major League Baseball. He also worked as an American football coach and official.

Born in Canada and raised in Concordia, Kansas, Quigley attended college and law school at the University of Kansas. There he played college basketball under the game's inventor, James Naismith. He became the head football coach at Kansas Wesleyan University and then the athletic director at the University of Kansas. Quigley refereed college basketball for 40 years and umpired more than 3,000 Major League Baseball games. As a college football official, he worked in several bowl games and served on the Rules Committee of the NCAA for several years.

Quigley died in Kansas in 1960.

== Early life ==
Quigley was born in Newcastle, New Brunswick, and was raised in Concordia, Kansas where he was a prominent member of the high school football team in the 1890s.

== Coaching and administrative career ==
Quigley was a student of basketball inventor James Naismith at the University of Kansas. He also played football at Kansas from 1900 to 1901.

=== St. Mary's ===
After graduating, he served as a coach, teacher and athletic director at St. Mary's College in St. Marys, Kansas, from 1903 until 1912, while also attending law school at the University of Kansas.

=== Kansas ===
In 1944, Quigley became the athletic director at the University of Kansas, where he hired coaches George Sauer, Jules V. Sikes, and Dick Harp.

== Officiating career ==
Quigley officiated at more than 1,500 collegiate and Amateur Athletic Union games during his 40-year career, and supervised the NCAA tournament officials from 1940 to 1942. He also refereed the basketball finals between the United States and Canada at the 1936 Summer Olympics in Berlin, played outdoors in the rain, in the first Games at which basketball was a medal sport. Rather than using his whistle, the small-statured Quigley often used his high-pitched voice to command attention in supervising play. In 1944 he became athletic director at Kansas, serving until 1950. He was enshrined in the Basketball Hall of Fame in 1961.

=== Professional baseball ===
Quigley was also a National League baseball umpire from 1913 to 1937, and oversaw six World Series, most notably the notorious 1919 Black Sox series, as well as those in 1916, 1921, 1924, 1927 and 1935; he was crew chief for the 1927 Series. On June 1, 1923, he was the home plate umpire for the game in which the New York Giants, visiting the Philadelphia Phillies, became the first 20th-century team to score in every inning of a 9-inning game, winning 22–8. He also participated in a 1928 baseball tour of Japan, and later became an NL supervisor of umpires. After a 1933 game, Quigley was found unconscious by partner George Barr following an electric shock from an exposed wire; he recovered uneventfully. His 3,351 games as an umpire ranked seventh in major league history when he retired; his 1,511 games behind home plate are still the tenth most in history. Quigley Field, the University of Kansas' first baseball stadium, was named after him.

=== College football ===
Quigley also served as an official in major college football contests including the Army–Navy Game, five Harvard–Yale games, the Michigan–Illinois game, three Rose Bowls (1920, 1925, 1927), and the Cotton Bowl Classic. He was a member of the NCAA's Rules Committee from 1946 to 1954.

== Personal life and death ==
Quigley married Marge Darlington in Concordia. The ceremony was held in the home of the bride. Quigley died at age 80 in Lawrence, Kansas and was buried at that city's Mt. Calvary Cemetery. At the time of his death he was survived by two sons, 16 grandchildren and four great-grand-children.

He was also the brother of Larry Quigley, a football coach at closeby NAIA Benedictine College and Kansas Wesleyen.

== See also ==
- List of Major League Baseball umpires (disambiguation)
