= Emene =

Urban community in Enugu State

Emene is an urban community in Enugu East, Enugu State, Nigeria, traditionally under Nike.

== Description ==
Emene is made up of three communities namely, the Amechi, Oguru and Otukwu with an estimated population of 128,000 according to the 1991 census.

Emene is home to the production of "steel rods, asbestos cement products, and oxygen and acetylene gases".
