= Carrie Johnson (journalist) =

American journalist

- Occupation: Journalist
- Known for: Justice Correspondent at National Public Radio

Carrie Johnson is a Justice Correspondent at National Public Radio.

== Education ==
- University of Wisconsin–Madison, 1996
- Benedictine University, 1994

== Career ==
After graduating from the University of Wisconsin–Madison, Johnson was a reporter for Legal Times (1996–2000), before moving to The Washington Post (2000–2010). In 2009, she briefly and intermittently wrote as a freelancer for the Columbia Law School Magazine.

Since 2010, Carrie Johnson has been a Justice Correspondent at National Public Radio. She covers a wide range of emerging justice issues, law enforcement stories, and legal affairs for the NPR programs Morning Edition and All Things Considered.

In addition to her work at NPR, she also often moderates or appears as a panelist on legal panels for the American Bar Association, the American Constitution Society, the National Association of Criminal Defense Lawyers, and other organizations. She has discussed her work on CNN, MSNBC, Fox News, PBS, and other media outlets.
