= Benedictine Ravens =

Athletic teams representing Benedictine College

- University: Benedictine College
- Nickname: Ravens
- NAIA: Division I
- Conference: Heart of America Athletic Conference
- Athletic director: Charles Gartenmayer
- Location: Atchison, Kansas
- Varsity teams: 20
- Football stadium: O'Malley Field at Larry Wilcox Stadium
- Basketball arena: Ralph Nolan Gymnasium
- Baseball stadium: Laughlin Field at Olsen Stadium
- Softball stadium: Asher Sports Complex
- Soccer stadium: John Casey Soccer Center
- Colors: Black, white, and red
- Mascot: Rocky
- Fight song: Raven Fight Song
- Website: ravenathletics.com
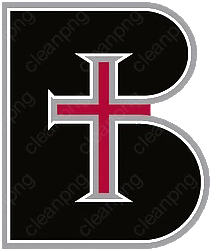

The Benedictine Ravens are the athletic teams that represent Benedictine College, located in Atchison, Kansas, in intercollegiate sports as a member of the National Association of Intercollegiate Athletics (NAIA), primarily competing in the Heart of America Athletic Conference (HAAC) since the 1991–92 academic year. The Ravens previously competed as an NAIA Independent from 1962–63 to 1990–91; in the Central Intercollegiate Athletic Conference (CIC) from 1937–38 to 1961–62; as an Independent from January 1929 (during the 1928–29 school year) to 1936–37; and in the Kansas Collegiate Athletic Conference (KCAC) from 1902–03 to 1927–28.

The men's college was known as St. Benedict's College (alongside sister institution Mount St. Scholastica College) until a merger in 1971 created co-ed Benedictine College.

Benedictine won NAIA titles in men's basketball (1954, 1967) and women's lacrosse (2022). The Ravens played in the first NAIA basketball tournament in 1937 and the first football playoffs in 1958.

== Varsity teams ==
Benedictine competes in 20 intercollegiate varsity sports: Men's sports include baseball, basketball, cross country, football, lacrosse, soccer, track & field (indoor and outdoor) and wrestling; while women's sports include basketball, cross country, lacrosse, soccer, softball, track & field (indoor and outdoor) and volleyball; and co-ed sports include cheerleading, dance and spirit squad.

== NAIA basketball champions ==
The Ravens won the NAIA Tournament in Kansas City in 1954 and 1967, both under NAIA Hall of Fame coach Ralph Nolan.

The two champions took decidedly different routes to the title. The 1954 Ravens were regarded as underdogs throughout their run. The field included two-time defending champion Southwest Missouri State and East Texas State, the third-place finisher in 1953.

The 1967 Ravens came to Kansas City as the top seed.

In 1954, St. Benedict's College defeated Western Illinois 62–56 in the title game.

In 1967, the Ravens entered the tournament as the No. 1 seed. St. Benedict's won its second title with a 71–65 victory over Oklahoma Baptist.

The 1967 Ravens are one of six teams to finish the season No. 1 in the coaches poll, enter the tournament as the top seed and win the title.

In 2020, The Kansas City Star named Darryl Jones, a star of the 1967 team, and Nolan to the all-time NAIA Tournament team.

Benedictine has made 12 appearances in the NAIA Tournament, most recently in 2021.

The Ravens qualified for the NAIA in 2014, 2015, 2017, 2019 and 2021 under coach Ryan Moody.

St. Benedict's played in the first NAIA Tournament in 1937 as one of eight teams in the field in Kansas City. The Ravens also qualified in 1953, 1958, 1965 and 1970. The 1965 Ravens advanced to the final eight of the 32-team field.

St. Benedict's also won Central Intercollegiate Conference titles in 1953, 1954 and 1958.

In 2014, Benedictine made its first appearance since 1970 and won its opening game over Westminster (70–65).

1954 NAIA champions
Municipal Auditorium - Kansas City, Mo.
St. Benedict's 68, East Carolina 61
St. Benedict's 74, St. Ambrose 50
St. Benedict's 62, Pasadena 61
St. Benedict's 63, Arkansas Tech 59 (semifinal)
St. Benedict's 62, Western Illinois 56 (final)

1967 NAIA champions
Municipal Auditorium - Kansas City, Mo.
St. Benedict's 80, Linfield 75
St. Benedict's 67, Southern State 56
St. Benedict's 88, St. Mary's 73
St. Benedict's 73, Morris Harvey 70 (semifinal)
St. Benedict's 71, Oklahoma Baptist 65 (final)

Men's basketball postseason appearances
Season	Tournament	Coach
1937	NAIA (0–1)	Mullins
1949	National Catholic Invitational Tournament (2–2)	Walsh
1953	NAIA (1–1)	Nolan
1954	NAIA champions (5–0)	Nolan
1958	NAIA (0–1)	Nolan
1965	NAIA quarterfinals (2–1)	Nolan
1967	NAIA champions (5–0)	Nolan
1970	NAIA (0–1)	Nolan
2014	NAIA (1–1)	Moody
2015	NAIA (0–1)	Moody
2017	NAIA (0–1)	Moody
2019	NAIA (1–1)	Moody
2021	NAIA (1–1)	Moody

NAIA district basketball playoffs
Season	Tournament	Coach
1953	District 10 playoff series champions (SBC 2, Ottawa 1)	Nolan
1954	District 10 playoff series champions (SBC 2, Kansas Wesleyan 0)	Nolan
1958	District 10 playoff series champions (SBC 2, Ottawa 0)	Nolan
1965	District 10 playoff series champions (SBC 2, Bethany 0)	Nolan
1966	District 10 playoffs (1–1, 3rd)	Nolan
1967	District 10 playoffs champions (2–0)	Nolan
1968	District 10 playoffs (1–1, 2nd)	Nolan
1969	District 10 playoffs (0–1)	Nolan
1970	District 10 playoffs champions (2–0)	Nolan
1971	District 10 playoffs (0–1))	Colwell
1972	District 10 playoffs (0–1)	Colwell
1977	District 10 playoffs (1–1)	Jones
1981	District 10 playoffs (1–1)	Judge
1982	District 10 playoffs (0–1)	Judge
1987	District 10 playoffs (0–1)	Morley
1988	District 10 playoffs (0–1)	Morley
1990	District 10 playoffs (0–1)	Sickafoose
1991	District 10 playoffs (0–1)	Sickafoose
1992	District 16 playoffs (1–1)	Sickafoose
1993	District 16 playoffs (0–1)	Sickafoose

== Football's rise, fall and return ==
The story of football at Benedictine College is written by coach Larry Wilcox, who played for the Ravens and took over as coach at age 28. He coached for 42 seasons before retiring in 2020. Along the way, he played a major role in the college's financial health and enrollment, built a football stadium, offices and weight room, won 300-plus games and mentored many lives.

Wilcox and his long-time assistants are considered a key part of the Benedictine experience by many football players who have been on the team.

The Ravens own 16 NAIA playoff appearances, including a runner-up finish in 2018 and trips to the semifinals in 1992 and 2001. They made eight appearances in nine seasons between 1995 and 2003.

As St. Benedict's, the Ravens made their first appearance in 1958 as one of four NAIA playoff teams.

The 2018 Ravens went 13–2 to set a school record for season victories. They won the Heart of America Athletic Conference North Division title. In the NAIA playoffs, they defeated Cumberlands (48–41), Concordia (54–38) and Kansas Wesleyan (43–21) to advance to the NAIA title game. Top-ranked Morningside defeated Benedictine 35–28 in Daytona Beach, Fla.

More than 3,000 Benedictine fans traveled to the game.

Ravens in the final NAIA poll (since 1997)
Season	Rank (Record)	Coach
1997	No. 10 (9–2)	Wilcox
1998	No. 5 (9–2)	Wilcox
2000	No. 3 (10–1)	Wilcox
2001	No. 4 (12–2)	Wilcox
2002	No. 12 (9–3)	Wilcox
2003	No. 12 (9–3)	Wilcox
2006	No. 18 (9–3)	Wilcox
2011	No. 15 (9–3)	Wilcox
2012	No. 22 (7–4)	Wilcox
2013	No. 9 (10–2)	Wilcox
2014	No. 25 (7–4)	Wilcox
2015	No. 21 (7–4)	Wilcox
2016	No. 23 (7–4)	Wilcox
2017	No. 12 (9–3)	Wilcox
2018	No. 2 (11–2)	Wilcox
2019	No. 18 (8–3)	Wilcox
2020	No. 16 (8–1)	Wilcox/Osborn
2022	No. 6 (11–2)	Osborn
2023	No. 25 (8–3)	Osborn
2024	No. 3 (tie) (11–3)	Osborn
2025	No. 3 (12–2)	Osborn

St. Benedict's started football in 1920 and the program enjoyed several high points in its early years. The school dropped football after the 1962 season. Varsity football returned in 1973.

Wilcox came to St. Benedict's in 1969 and joined the football club upon its revival in 1970 on its way to varsity status.

Wilcox, after serving as assistant coach, took over the program in 1979 and presided over its transformation into a consistent winner and regular NAIA playoff qualifier. The Ravens play in Larry Wilcox Stadium, opened in 1998, on campus. In 1990, the Ravens moved into the Amino Center locker room, offices and weight room. Benedictine expanded the facility in 2004 and 2007.

Wilcox, a 1972 graduate, was inducted into the NAIA Hall of Fame in 2017. He coached the Ravens to 14 of their 15 NAIA playoff appearances.

Football postseason appearances
Season	Bowl/playoff	Coach
1956	Mineral Water Bowl - St. Benedict's 14, Northeastern Oklahoma 13	Schottel
1958	NAIA Western Playoff (0–1)	Schottel
1976	Boot Hill Bowl - BC 29, Washburn 14	Tardiff
1977	Boot Hill Bowl - Missouri Western 35, BC 30	May
1985	NAIA playoffs (0–1)	Wilcox
1986	Sunflower Bowl - Tarleton State 40, BC 38	Wilcox
1991	Steamboat Bowl - BC 18, Friends 13	Wilcox
1992	NAIA semifinal (2–1)	Wilcox
1995	NAIA playoffs (0–1)	Wilcox
1996	NAIA playoffs (0–1)	Wilcox
1997	NAIA playoffs (0–1)	Wilcox
1998	NAIA playoffs (0–1)	Wilcox
2000	NAIA playoffs (0–1)	Wilcox
2001	NAIA semifinal (2–1)	Wilcox
2002	NAIA playoffs (0–1)	Wilcox
2003	NAIA playoffs (0–1)	Wilcox
2011	NAIA playoffs (0–1)	Wilcox
2013	NAIA playoffs (0–1)	Wilcox
2017	NAIA playoffs (0–1)	Wilcox
2018	NAIA runner-up (3–1)	Wilcox
2022	NAIA playoffs (1–1)	Osborn
2024	NAIA semifinal (2–1)	Osborn
2025	NAIA semifinal (2–1)	Osborn

In 2004, Wilcox donated his salary to help complete expansion of the Amino Center.

St. Benedict's played in its first bowl game in 1956 under coach Ivan Schottel. The Ravens defeated Northeastern Oklahoma State 14–13 in the Mineral Water Bowl in Excelsior Springs, Mo. Since resuming football, the Ravens won the 1976 Boot Hill Bowl and the 1991 Steamboat Bowl. They lost in the 1977 Boot Hill Bowl and the 1986 Sunflower Bowl.

St. Benedict's won its first conference title in 1940 under coach Marty Peters. The Ravens went 4–0 in the Central Intercollegiate Conference with wins over Fort Hays State, Pittsburg State, Southwestern and Emporia State. Schottel became coach in 1953 and won or shared CIC titles in 1953, 1956, 1958, 1959 and 1960.

The 1958 Ravens went 10–1 and rose to No. 5 in the NAIA rankings before losing to Northeastern Oklahoma in the NAIA Western Playoff. The Ravens won the CIC title and grabbed 10 of the 11 spots on the first-team all-conference team. Quarterback Mark Flynn was named CIC Back of the Year and George Worley was the CIC Lineman of the Year. Worley was also named NAIA Lineman of the Year.

St. Benedict's also enjoyed a notable run of success in the 1930s under coach Moon Mullins. He coached five seasons and went 37–5–1, capped by an 8–0 season in 1936.

Benedictine played as an independent after resuming football in 1973. It rekindled CIC rivalries against schools such as Washburn and Emporia State at times, and also regularly played Missouri Western. After years of lobbying (and a short run in the Tri-State Conference), Benedictine joined the Heart of America in 1992 and shared the conference title with Baker.

The Ravens went 9–0 in the Heart in 1995 to win its second title. It also won Heart titles in 1997, 1998, 2000 and 2013. It claimed Heart North Division titles in 2017 and 2018.

Unbeaten regular seasons
Season	Record	Coach
1925	6–0–1	Quigley
1936	8–0	Mullins
1958	10–0 (10–1 final record)	Schottel
1985	10–0 (10–1 final record	Wilcox
1995	9–0 (9–1 final record)	Wilcox
2000	10–0 (10–1 final record)	Wilcox

== "A strangle hold on the honor and glory that goes with crushing Rockhurst" ==
For 60-plus years, the Ravens and Rockhurst College faced off in a rivalry as intense as any in small-college athletics. The Catholic colleges are separated by 56 miles and their meetings, especially in basketball, defined seasons and packed gymnasiums for decades.

Fans rode trains to Kansas City for games and students dribbled a basketball from the Atchison campus to Kansas City in a show of spirit. In the 1960s and 1970s, the meetings in Kansas City often drew crowds of 5–10,000 to Municipal Auditorium. In Atchison, the gym would be packed with 3,000 fans at 1:30 for a 3 p.m. game. "Rockhurst Weekend" became the social and party event of the school year in Atchison, regardless of the outcome of the game. It traditionally started with beer and Wheaties breakfast at The Wharf and included a rivalry t-shirt mocking the Hawks before an afternoon game.

Students stole NAIA championship banners from each campus, lobbed stink bombs into open dorm windows and distributed leaflets with insults - Rockhurst mocked St. Benedict's students as "Hayseeds." Rockhurst students enjoyed visiting Atchison to rearrange a rock formation spelling "St. Benedict's" by changing the "B" to "R" and painting it blue. Several times, Rockhurst fans attempted to invade the Snakepit seating area in the Benedictine gym and had to be forcibly removed. Benedictine students planned for weeks a strategy to sneak chickens, sometimes painted blue, into the game. Hanging insulting banners from the rafters was another popular prank.

In 1970, St. Benedict's students celebrated a seven-game basketball win streak over the Hawks by taking out an advertisement in the Kansas City Times. The copy recounted St. Benedict's two NAIA titles and taunted "The Raven Sports Arena Awaits You Hawks."

In 1990, Benedictine students kidnapped the Hawks mascot costume, performed during a soccer game and returned to Atchison with the prize.

While basketball grabbed most of the attention, football and soccer games also fueled the rivalry.

The Ravens dominated the football series by winning 16 of the 23 meetings between 1921 and 1949. Rockhurst dropped the sport in 1949. St. Benedict's won the first meeting 35–0 and shut out the Hawks six times. The Ravens won 12 straight meetings from 1932 to 1946 and won the final meeting 27–13 in 1949.

In 1936, The Kansas City Times reported a crowd of 5,000 watched a 32–6 win by St. Benedict's in Kansas City. "The Ravens, on the loose all season, flew up and down Bourke field yesterday and in fewer than twenty minutes after the start had a strangle hold on the honor and glory that goes with crushing Rockhurst college's Hawks, their traditional rivals."

In soccer, Rockhurst dominated the Missouri NAIA district as the Ravens did Kansas. The Hawks regularly tormented Benedictine by knocking it out of NAIA Tournament contention in the Area Playoffs. The Ravens defeated Rockhurst in 1974 and 1983 to advance to the national tournament.

The basketball series peaked in the 1960s, when Rockhurst won the NAIA title in 1964 and the Ravens in 1967. St. Benedict's, which also won in 1954 and returned to the NAIA in 1958, advanced to Kansas City in 1965 and 1970. Rockhurst qualified in 1963, 1966 and 1967.

Rockhurst won the first meeting 36–33 in 1921, and four of the first five. In 1935, the Ravens started a streak of six wins and 12 in 13 meetings. The Ravens won 16 straight from 1946 to 1954. A 10-game win streak carried the Ravens from 1966 to 1971. Rockhurst dominated the 1980s by winning 20 in a row. Late in the 1980s, Benedictine's program improved under coaches Del Morley and Mike Sickafoose and the rivalry became competitive again.

The series started to fade in the mid-1990s. Benedictine joined the Heart of America Athletic Conference in 1992, which made playing Rockhurst twice on its traditional Saturday spots impossible because of conference scheduling requirements. In 1998, Rockhurst joined NCAA Division II. The teams played occasionally in recent seasons, sometimes as an exhibition game.

== Highlights of the basketball rivalry with Rockhurst ==
1939–40

Ravens 50, Hawks 18 in Atchison – The Ravens handed Rockhurst the “worst basketball licking” of the series. Jack Andrews and Ed Farrell both scored eight points for St. Benedict’s. Farrell “plunked in three extra long swishers in succession.”

1946–47

Ravens 45, Hawks 43 in Atchison – “St. Benedict’s college defeated Rockhurst college, 45 to 43.

1957–58

Ravens 69, Hawks 50 in Kansas City – St. Benedict’s ended a six-game losing streak in the series with a win at Mason-Halpin Fieldhouse. Bob Veale, who would later pitch for the Pittsburgh Pirates, scored 22 points for the Ravens.

1964–65

Ravens 85, Hawks 83 at Municipal Auditorium – Darryl Jones scored 25 points, 18 in the first half, to help St. Benedict’s defeat the reigning NAIA champions.

1966–67

Ravens 92, Hawks 90 at Municipal Auditorium – Darryl Jones’ steal and dunk gave St. Benedict's a 90–88 lead and Hawks coach Dolor Rehm had to be restrained from going after the officials. A steal by Vince DeGreeff led to clinching free throws for the Ravens. DeGreeff scored 31 points to help St. Benedict's improve to 17–2 on their way to the NAIA title.

1968–69

Ravens 75, Hawks 69 in Atchison – Tim Moore scored 27 points to give St. Benedict's its sixth straight win over Rockhurst.

1970–71

Ravens 87, Hawks 85 in Atchison – Jay Williams followed in a missed shot by Chic Downing in the final seconds. Downing scored 21 points and Williams added 14 and 13 rebounds.

1971–72

Ravens 83, Hawks 80 in Kansas City – Chic Downing scored 21 points and Jackie Lee added 17 for the Ravens, who avenged a 60–58 overtime defeat earlier in the season. A crowd of 5,400 watched.

1987–88

Ravens 96, Hawks 76 in Kansas City – Benedictine snapped a 20-game losing streak in the series with Tony Russo scoring 22 points. Tony Tanking made four three-pointers to score 19 points and the Ravens defeated the Hawks for the first time since 1978.

1989–90

Ravens 78, Hawks 74 in Atchison – Pat Giller scored 29 points and the Ravens rallied from an 11-point deficit in the second half. Pat Giller scores against Rockhurst.

1991–92

Ravens 82, Hawks 74 in Kansas City – Technical fouls and a potential scuffle in the final seconds highlighted Benedictine's win. Jason Wyrick scored 22 points for the Ravens

1992–93

Ravens 120, Hawks 113 (three overtimes) in Atchison – Rockhurst led 79–77 in the closing seconds of regulation, 92–89 in the final seconds of the first overtime and 103–101 late in the second overtime. Benedictine's Jason Wyrick, fouled on a desperation shot with no time remaining, made three foul shots to tie it 92-all and force the second overtime. Wyrick, again fouled on a three-point shot, made two foul shots to give the Ravens a 112–107 lead in the final overtime. Matt Westerhaus led the Ravens with 33 points. Albert Karner added 19 points – all from the line – with 17 assists and 12 rebounds.

1993–94

Ravens 82, Hawks 74 in Atchison – Current Benedictine coach Ryan Moody scored 29 points.

== NAIA basketball All-Americans ==
Darryl Jones, a 6-foot-5 forward, and Chic Downing, a 6-foot-7 center, are the lone Ravens to earn first-team NAIA All-American honors.

Jones, from St. Louis, is the school's most-decorated basketball player. He was named NAIA All-American four times - third team in 1965 and 1966 and first in 1967 and 1968. He scored 2,014 points to rank second on the career list. He owns the program's career rebounding mark with 1,471, highlighted by an average of 15.1 a game in 1967.

Downing, from Atchison, earned first-team honors in 1972 and third team in 1970. Downing is the program's career scoring leader with 2,042 points and rank second with 1,158 rebounds. He averaged a program-best 25.5 points in 1971–72, as well as 13.4 rebounds. The New York Knicks selected Downing in the 11th round of the 1972 NBA Draft.

Downing, 72, died on February 22, 2020, in Atchison. He won four state titles as coach at Atchison High School, as well as two as a player for the Redmen. He was an All-State selection in 1968 before attending St. Benedict's. He was named KBCA Coach of the Year in 1985 and 1988.

NAIA All-Americans
Name	Team	Season
Joe Stueve	Third	1954
Dan Rupp	HM (AP Small College)	1957
Don Listar	Third	1961
Pat Hare	HM	1964
Darryl Jones	Third	1965
Pat Hare	HM	1965
Darryl Jones	Third	1966
Darryl Jones	First	1967
Vince DeGreeff	Third	1967
Darryl Jones	First	1968
Chic Downing	Third	1970
Chic Downing	First	1972
Dan Van Dyke	Third	2008
Quaran Johnson	HM	2012
Charlie Wallrap	HM	2013
Charlie Wallrap	HM	2014
John Harris Jr.	HM	2015
Andre Yates	Second	2017
Thomas O'Connor	Second	2019
Adam Kutney	Second	2019
Jaiden Bristol	Second	2021

== 1949 Ravens upset Siena, Dayton at NCIT ==
In 1948–49, St. Benedict's accepted a spot in the first National Catholic Invitational Tournament in Denver, as part of a 16-team field. The Ravens, coached by Robert Walsh, entered the tournament with an 8–13 record. They upset top-seeded Siena, which had a 22–6 record, in the opening game 61–46. St. Benedict's defeated Dayton 59–55 in the quarterfinals.

St. Francis (N.Y.) handled the Ravens 69–40 in the semifinals. St. Benedict's finished fourth after a 71–70 loss to Loyola of Baltimore in the third-place game. Ken Werba of St. Benedict's was named to the all-tournament team. He scored 19 points in the win over Siena, headlined "Unheralded Kansas Team Knocks Siena Out of Catholic Cage Tourney" in a New York newspaper.

Host Regis College won the title after finishing as the 1949 NAIA Tournament runner-up earlier that month.

The NCIT lasted for four years. In 1949, the NCAA Tournament invited eight teams and 12 went to the NIT. The NCIT was designed for Catholic colleges without a conference affiliation.

== Football All-Americans, all-conference selections from 1936-present ==
Running back Don Brown and center Truman Ashby are Benedictine football players named first-team NAIA All-American twice. Brown gained 4,490 yards and scored 50 touchdowns in his career.

Other two-time All-Americans include defensive back/returner Shem Johnson (second team in 1997, 1998), returner and receiver Cory Schrick (first team 1999, second 2000) and offensive lineman Garrett Bader (second team 2017, first team 2018). Bader is one of three Ravens to win the Rimington Award as the NAIA's top center. He earned the honor in 2018 to join Ashby (2007) and David Stochlin (2014).

NAIA First-team All-Americans
Name	Position	Season
Bill Daletski	E	1954
Cary Shaw	K	1977
Jeff Pirog	OL	1985
Larry Minner	DL	1987
Marty Kobza	LB	1989
Don Brown	RB	1992
Don Brown	RB	1993
Shawn Conner	DL	1994
Dan Ruch	K	1995
Mike Federico	DL	1998
Shem Johnson	DB	1998
Cory Schrick	RS	1999
Larry Nations	OL	2000
Matt Fowler	WR	2001
Guido Trinidad	LB	2002
Byron Mitchell-Hughley	DB	2003
Truman Ashby	C	2006
Truman Ashby	C	2007
Conor Walsh	WR	2008
Ron Fontenot	OL	2011
Cameron Fore	RB	2013
David Stochlin	OL	2014
Ejay Johnson	RB	2017
Garrett Bader	OL	2018
Marquis Stewart	RB	2019
Ja'Kobe Hinton	OG	2023
Jacob Gathright	WR	2024
Harry Balke	K	2024
Isaiah Hasten (AP, Victory Sports, NAIA)	DB	2025
Christian Klobe (Victory Sports)	K	2025
Rashad Beckham (AP)	OT	2025

AP Little All-Americans
Name	Position	Season
Leo Deutsch	E	1936
Leo Danahaer	HB	1937
Larry Visnic	G	1942 (2nd team)
Don O'Connor	FB	1942 (Collier's)
Richard Rzeszut	C	1953 (Honorable mention)
Pat Carroll	B	1953 (Honorable mention)
Jerry Mohlman	B	1956 (Honorable mention)
Jerry Jurczak	C	1957 (2nd team)
George Worley	G	1958 (3rd team)
Larry Muff	DE	1960 (Honorable mention)
Allen Lewis	RB	1960 (Honorable mention)
Keith Hertling	RB	1976 (Honorable mention)
Jamie Mueller	RB	1986 (Honorable mention)

Central Intercollegiate Conference Player of the Year
Name	Honor	Season
HB Gerald Mohlman	Back of the Year	1956
E Don Schmidt	Lineman of the Year	1956
HB Gerald Mohlman	Back of the Year	1957
QB Mark Flynn	Back of the Year	1958
G George Worley	Lineman of the Year	1958

First-team All-CIC
Name	Position	Season
Bill Maus	C	1962
Larry Muff	E	1960
Bob Frazier	G	1960
Bill Maus	C	1960
Bernard Figiel	QB	1960
Allen Lewis	HB	1960
Tom Waller	E	1959
Jim O'Brien	QB	1959
Jerry Allen	G	1959
Leroy Brungardt	T	1959
Francis Leikam	E	1958
Tom Waller	E	1958
George Tardiff	T	1958
Ed Oswald	T	1958
George Worley	G	1958
Jerry Jurczak	C	1958
Mark Flynn	QB	1958
Gerald Mohlman	B	1958
Fred Finder	B	1958
Jim Purslow	B	1958
Francis Leikam	E	1957
Jerry Jurczak	E	1957
Gerald Mohlman	B	1957
Mark Flynn	QB	1957
Mark Flynn	QB	1956
Don Schmidt	E	1956
Dick Senecal	C	1956
Gerald Mohlman	B	1956
Fred Finder	B	1956
Mark Flynn	QB	1955
Mike Collins	G	1954
Bill Daletski	E	1954
Doug Heaton	B	1954
Jerry Gadja	B	1954
Dick Rzeszut	C	1953
Pat Carroll	B	1953
Thad Zurawski	E	1953
Clarence Rzeszut	C	1952
Pat Carroll	B	1952
Joe Young	B	1952
George Wendell	E	1946
George Wendell	E	1942
Bill Loika	T	1942
Steve Gergeni	E	1940
Larry Visnic	G	1940
Nick Foran	T	1940
Irv Comp	HB	1940
Don O'Connor	FB	1940
Joe Ziemba	E	1939
Nick Foran	T	1939
Francis Lynch	FB	1939

Heart of America Conference Player of the Year
Name	Honor	Season
LB Ken McGibney	Defensive POY	1992
TE Dan Neil	Offensive POY	1995
TE Dan Neil	Offensive POY	1996
DB Shem Johnson	Defensive POY	1998
LB Guido Trinidad	Defensive POY	2002
RB John Willits	Offensive POY	2004
DL Atonio Lolesio	Defensive POY	2005
DE Robbie Schultz	Defensive POY	2008
DL Jordan Ancar	Defensive POY	2011
RB Cameron Fore	Offensive POY	2013
QB Shaefer Schutz	North Division Offensive POY	2018
RB Marquis Stewart	South Division POY	2019
RB Marquis Stewart	South Division Offensive POY	2019
LB Brett Shepardson	South Division Defensive POY	2020
LB Brett Shepardson	South Division Co-POY	2020
LB Jalen James	South Division Co-Defensive POY	2021
QB Garrett Kettle	South Division POY	2022
QB Garrett Kettle	South Division Offensive POY	2022
WR Jacob Gathright	South Division POY	2024
QB Jackson Dooley	South Division Offensive POY	2024
QB Jackson Dooley	South Division POY	2025
RB Xavier Ugorji	South Division Offensive POY	2025
S Isaiah Hasten	South Division Defensive POY	2025

== Women's basketball grows into consistent winner ==
Benedictine College started varsity women's basketball in 1973–74 and the program muddled its way to two winning seasons over the next 21 seasons.

Then Benedictine found the right two coaches, both of whom made the Ravens consistent winners.

In 1994, Benedictine hired Steve Huber, an assistant coach at Bradley University and a man with a passion for recruiting. Huber changed the program quickly and its success continued under current coach Chad Folsom, an Atchison native who played at Maur Hill Prep.

Huber's first team went 11–20, followed by 16–15. In 1996–97, the Ravens went 25–6 to start a string of three 25-win seasons under Huber. The Ravens won Heart of America Conference titles in 1998 and 1999 and advanced to the NAIA Division II national tournament in 1997, 1998 and 1999.

In 1998, eighth-seeded Benedictine won its first national tournament game, 68–47 over Illinois-Springfield. The 1999 Ravens made 42.6 percent of their three-point shots to lead NAIA Division II for the second time under Huber.

Women's basketball NAIA Tournament appearances
Season	Tournament	Coach
1997	NAIA Division II (0–1)	Huber
1998	NAIA Division II (1–1)	Huber
1999	NAIA Division II (0–1)	Huber
2006	NAIA Division II (2–1))	Folsom
2008	NAIA Division II (1–1)	Folsom
2013	NAIA Division I (1–1)	Folsom
2015	NAIA Division I (1–1)	Folsom
2016	NAIA Division I Final Four (3–1)	Folsom
2017	NAIA Division I (0–1)	Folsom
2018	NAIA Division I (1–1)	Folsom
2021	NAIA (0–1)	Folsom
2022	NAIA (1–1)	Folsom
2024	NAIA (0–1)	Folsom
2025	NAIA (1–1)	Folsom
2026	NAIA (0–1)	Folsom

Women's basketball conference titles
Season/Conference	Overall record	Coach
1997–98 Heart of America	28–7	Huber
1998–99 Heart of America	26–7	Huber
2005–06 Heart of America	30–5	Folsom
2007–08 Heart of America	29–6	Folsom

Huber left Benedictine after the 1998–99 season to continue a career that included stops as an assistant at Central Missouri, Louisville, San Diego State and Creighton and the head coaching job at Drury.

In 2001, Chad Folsom left his job as men's coach at Lamar (Colo.) Community College to come to Benedictine. He guided the Ravens to a 22–10 record in his third season (2003–04).

In 2005–06, the Ravens went 30–5 to set a program record for wins and won the conference title. They advanced to the NAIA Division II Elite Eight. BC entered the national tournament seeded second and defeated Daeman 73–60 and Doane 56–55 before losing to College of the Ozarks 73–64 in double overtime in the quarterfinals.

NAIA All-Americans
Name	Position	Season
Mary DeGroot (1st team)	G	1997
Danielle Bagbey (3rd)	F	1998
Jessi Vercande (1st)	F	1999
Abby Winder (3rd)	F	2008
Chayla Rutledge (2nd)	F	2015
Chayla Rutledge (2nd)	F	2016
Kristen Murphy (2nd)	F	2017
Kristen Murphy (2nd)	F	2018

In 2007–08, Benedictine won another conference title and returned to the national tournament as the No. 3 seed. It defeated Aquinas 79–57 in the opener before losing to Hastings 70–62 to finish 29–6.

In 2009, the Heart moved to NAIA Division I. Benedictine qualified for the national tournament in 2013, 2015, 2016, 2017 and 2018.

In 2016, the Ravens advanced to the NAIA Final Four before losing to conference rival Baker 50–34 in the semifinals.

== Football rivalries with Pittsburg State, William Jewell and Baker ==
In 1960, St. Benedict's defeated Pittsburg State 41–19 in Atchison on its way to a CIC title. Quarterback Chris Tabor, now special teams coordinator for the Chicago Bears, led the Ravens to a 1992 NAIA playoff win over Baker at Amelia Earhart Stadium. Benedictine fans celebrate a 1985 win at William Jewell that clinched a 10–0 regular season. Running back Jamie Mueller, who played for the Buffalo Bills, helped the Ravens defeat William Jewell 35–17 in 1985 and clinch the program's first NAIA playoff berth since 1958.

Those three schools, in different eras, often marked pivotal dates on the schedule. Pittsburg State was an NAIA power in the 1950s, often battling with St. Benedict's for the CIC crown. Jewell also enjoyed great success in that time as a member of the MCAU and the schools often met in the regular-season finale.

Baker and Benedictine heated up as rivals in 1992 when the Ravens joined the Heart of America Conference. While Benedictine no longer plays Pitt State and Jewell (both are NCAA Division II schools), the series with Baker continues as a high point on the schedule.

In the 1950s, games against Pittsburg State often decided the CIC title. From 1955–61, the Ravens and Gorillas combined to win all seven championships. In 1953, the Ravens shared the CIC crown with Washburn. A year later, Fort Hays State won the title to interrupt the SBC/Pitt State dominance.

In 1957, Pitt State handed the Ravens their lone loss (17–13 in Pittsburg), and the Gorillas went 11–0 to win the NAIA title. In 1958, St. Benedict's defeated the Gorillas 26–19 on its way to the NAIA playoffs. In 1959, St. Benedict's won 13–12, Pitt State's lone CIC loss. In 1960, the Ravens won again (41–19) to hand the Gorillas their lone defeat in an 8–1 season.[22]

The Ravens did not lose a CIC game in 1958, 1959 and 1960.

William Jewell, which won seven MCAU titles from 1950 to 1960 also served as an important rival during those days. The 1958 Ravens completed an unbeaten regular season and clinched the NAIA playoff spot with a 21–20 win over Jewell. A year later, the Ravens again won the season finale over the Cardinals (25–21) to ruin Jewell's run at an unbeaten season. Again in 1960, the Ravens handed Jewell its lone defeat in the season finale, this time 34–13.

BC's move to the Heart in 1992 helped scheduling and added importance to rivalry games against Jewell and Baker.

The Ravens shared the Heart title in its first year as a member, going 7–1 in the Heart and 11–2 overall. It avenged a regular-season loss to Baker with a 21–14 win in the NAIA playoff quarterfinals at Amelia Earhart Stadium in Atchison.

The rivalry with William Jewell returned to prominence in the 1980s. The Cardinals dominated the Heart early in the decade and made NAIA playoff appearances in 1980, 1981, 1982 and 1983. They finished as NAIA runner-up in 1982.

In 1985, Jewell won the Heart title and played host to the unbeaten Ravens in the regular-season finale. Benedictine won 35–17 to improve to 10–0 and wrap up its first NAIA berth since 1958. The win snapped a five-game losing streak to Jewell and signaled a shift in the series. Benedictine went 19–6 against Jewell since that 1985 game until 2010, when Jewell left the Heart. The series ended with three straight wins by the Ravens by scores of 47–3, 24–7 and 21–0.

The rivalry with Baker continues.

Like Jewell, Baker was an NAIA power in the early 1980s and presented an obstacle as Benedictine built its program. Either Baker or Jewell (or both) won 12 of 13 Heart of America titles from 1979 to 1991. While Jewell played BC regularly, Baker and Benedictine did not become consistent opponents until the Ravens joined the Heart.

The series with Baker hit a high point early with the two meetings in 1992. In 2025, No. 3 BC defeated Baker 31–10 to win its fourth straight in the rivalry and narrow the Wildcat lead in the series to 22–19–1.

== Conference affiliations ==
St. Benedict's College joined the Central Intercollegiate Conference in 1938. It left the CIC in 1963 after dropping football in 1962. The CIC existed from 1928 to 1968 with members such as Pittsburg State, Fort Hays State, Emporia, Omaha and Washburn.

The basketball team continued to play a round robin schedule against its former CIC rivals into the 1980s.

From 1902 to 1928, St. Benedict's was a member of the Kansas College Athletic Conference. In 1933, according to a Kansas City Star report, St. Benedict's and Rockhurst were informally considered for membership in the MIAA (then known as the Missouri Intercollegiate Athletic Association).

In 1988, Benedictine joined the four-team Tri-State Conference, a football-only affiliation that lasted three seasons.

For most of the 1960s, 1970s and 1980s, the Ravens competed as an independent in NAIA District 10, which provided post-season competition and individual honors.

In 1992, Benedictine joined the Heart of America Athletic Conference for all sports, a group that the school had long targeted for its geographic and institutional fit.

Men's basketball conference/district titles
Season/Conference	Overall (Conference)	Coach
1952–53 CIC	21–8 (7–3)	Nolan
1952–53 NAIA District 10	21–8	Nolan
1953–54 CIC	24–5 (8–2)	Nolan
1953–54 NAIA District 10	24–5	Nolan
1957–58 CIC	20–6 (8–2)	Nolan
1957–58 NAIA District 10	20–6	Nolan
1964–65 NAIA District 10	26–3	Nolan
1966–67 NAIA District 10	27–2	Nolan
1969–70 NAIA District 10	17–9	Nolan
2013–14 Heart of America	23–9 (14–4)	Moody
2018–19 Heart of America	31–4 (24–0)	Moody

Football conference titles
Season/Conference	Overall (Conference)	Coach
1940 CIC (co-champions)	6–4 (4–0)	Peters
1953 CIC (co-champions)	7–3 (4–1)	Schottel
1956 CIC	7–3 (4–1)	Schottel
1958 CIC	10–1 (4–0)	Schottel
1959 CIC	7–3 (5–0)	Schottel
1960 CIC	7–1 (5–0)	Schottel
1992 Heart (co-champions)	11–2 (7–1)	Wilcox
1995 Heart	9–1 (9–0)	Wilcox
1997 Heart	9–2 (8–1)	Wilcox
1998 Heart	9–2 (8–1)	Wilcox
2000 Heart	10–1 (10–0)	Wilcox
2013 Heart (tri-champions)	10–2 (8–1)	Wilcox
2017 Heart (North Division co-champions)	9–3 (4–1)	Wilcox
2018 Heart (North Division)	13–2 (5–0)	Wilcox
2022 Heart (South Division)	11–2 (5–0)	Osborn
2023 Heart (South Division tri-champions)	8–3 (4–1)	Osborn
2024 Heart (South Division tri-champions)	9–2 (5–1)	Osborn
2025 Heart (South Division)	12–2 (6–0)	Osborn
2026 Heart (South Division)	TBD (6-0)	Osborn

== Moon Mullins starts a connection with Notre Dame ==
St. Benedict's College leaned on Notre Dame for several of its early athletic leaders.

In 1932, the college hired Larry "Moon" Mullins as football and basketball coach and athletic director. Mullins played fullback on two national champions under coach Knute Rockne with the Irish.

Mullins quickly turned those teams into winners. He went 37–5–1 in five seasons as football coach, with the University of Kansas responsible for two of those losses. Mullins finished his time in Atchison with strong seasons in both sports. The football team finished with an 8–0 record in 1936. The 1936–37 basketball team went 17–3 and played in the first NAIA Tournament.

Marty Peters, a football and basketball player at Notre Dame, replaced Mullins. Robert Walsh, who played offensive guard at Notre Dame, coached St. Benedict's in 1948 and 1949.

Mullins' influence continued in 1950 when St. Benedict's hired Leo Deutsch as football coach. Deustch played for Mullins at St. Benedict's and earned Associated Press Little All-America honors in 1936 at end. He served as Mullins' assistant coach at St. Ambrose (Iowa) before returning to Atchison to coach.

== Sports ==
Men's sports

- Baseball
- Basketball
- Cross country
- Football
- Soccer
- Field Lacrosse
- Track and Field
- Wrestling

Women's sports

- Basketball
- Cheerleading
- Cross country
- Dance Team
- Soccer
- Softball
- Track and Field
- Volleyball
- Women's Lacrosse

== Facilities ==
- The Ballpark at Benedictine: Baseball
- BC Softball Field: Softball
- The Haverty Center: Practice facilities, Cheer offices
- John Casey Soccer Center: Soccer, Lacrosse
- Laughlin Track at Larry Wilcox Stadium: Track and Field
- Mother Teresa Center: Athletic Training Facility
- O'Malley Field at Larry Wilcox Stadium: Football
- Ralph Nolan Gymnasium: Basketball and Volleyball

== Mascot ==
The mascot "Rocky" is associated with St. Benedict, as legend has it a raven would bring the sixth-century saint food during his time as a hermit in the mountains near Subiaco, Italy. The legend also has the raven saving St. Benedict from eating poisoned bread.

== Notable alumni ==
- Irv Comp, starting quarterback of the Green Bay Packers, member of the 1944 NFL Championship team
- Kyle Greig, professional soccer player having played in Major League Soccer and the United Soccer League, played at Benedictine from 2008 through 2011
- Terry Hanson, athlete and coach in Ravens Hall of Fame who went on to a successful career in pro sports and the media
- Darryl Jones, athlete led 1967 basketball team to NAIA National Championship, NAIA All-American and All-Decade team selection. drafted by NBA's San Diego Rockets prior their move to Houston
- Jamie Mueller, professional running back for the Buffalo Bills (1987–1990)
- Chris Tabor, Special teams coordinator for the Cleveland Browns (2011–2017) and the Chicago Bears (2018–present)
- Lindon Victor, bronze medalist in the decathlon at the 2024 Paris Olympics
