= Benedictine College =

Catholic college in Atchison, Kansas, U.S.

- Motto: Forward. Always Forward.
- Type: Private liberal arts college
- Established: 1971 by the merger of Mount St. Scholastica College (1923) and St. Benedict's College (1858)
- Religious affiliation: Catholic (Benedictines)
- Academic affiliations: ACCU, NAICU, CIC
- Endowment: $68.3 million (2025)
- President: Stephen D. Minnis
- Dean: Kimberly C. Shankman
- Students: 2,536 (fall 2024)
- Undergraduates: 2,404 (fall 2024)
- Postgraduates: 132 (fall 2024)
- Location: Atchison, Kansas, U.S. 39.5739°N 95.1147°W
- Campus: Rural
- Colors: Black, white, and red
- Nickname: Ravens
- Sporting affiliations: NAIA – HAAC
- Website: benedictine.edu
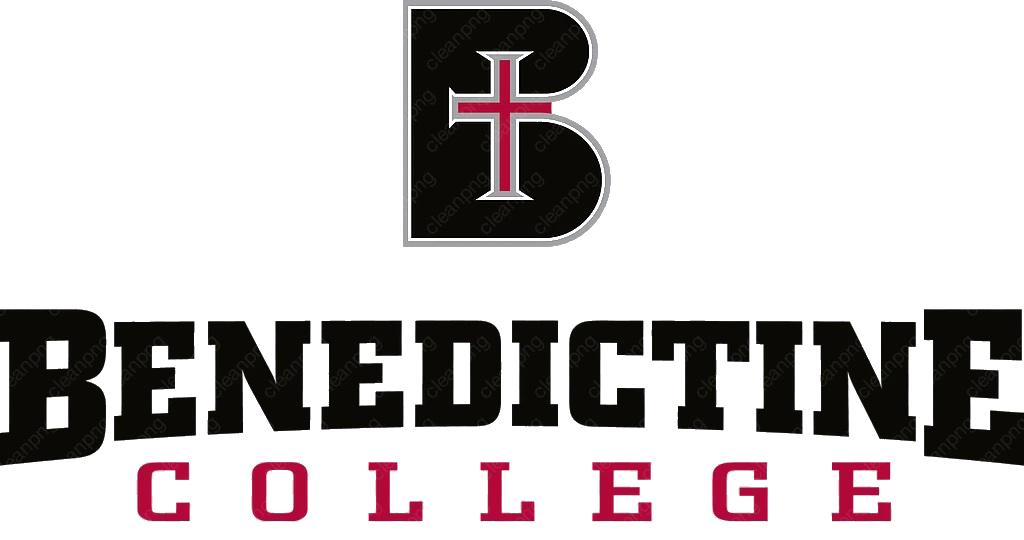

Benedictine College is a private Benedictine liberal arts college in Atchison, Kansas, United States. It was established in 1971 by the merger of St. Benedict's College (founded 1858) for men and Mount St. Scholastica College (founded 1923) for women.

Benedictine is one of a number of U.S. Benedictine colleges and is sponsored by St. Benedict's Abbey and Mount St. Scholastica Monastery.

== History ==
Benedictine College celebrated its 150th anniversary in 2008. The present-day college was formed in 1971 by the merger of "St. Benedict's College", a men's college, and "Mount St. Scholastica College", a women's college.

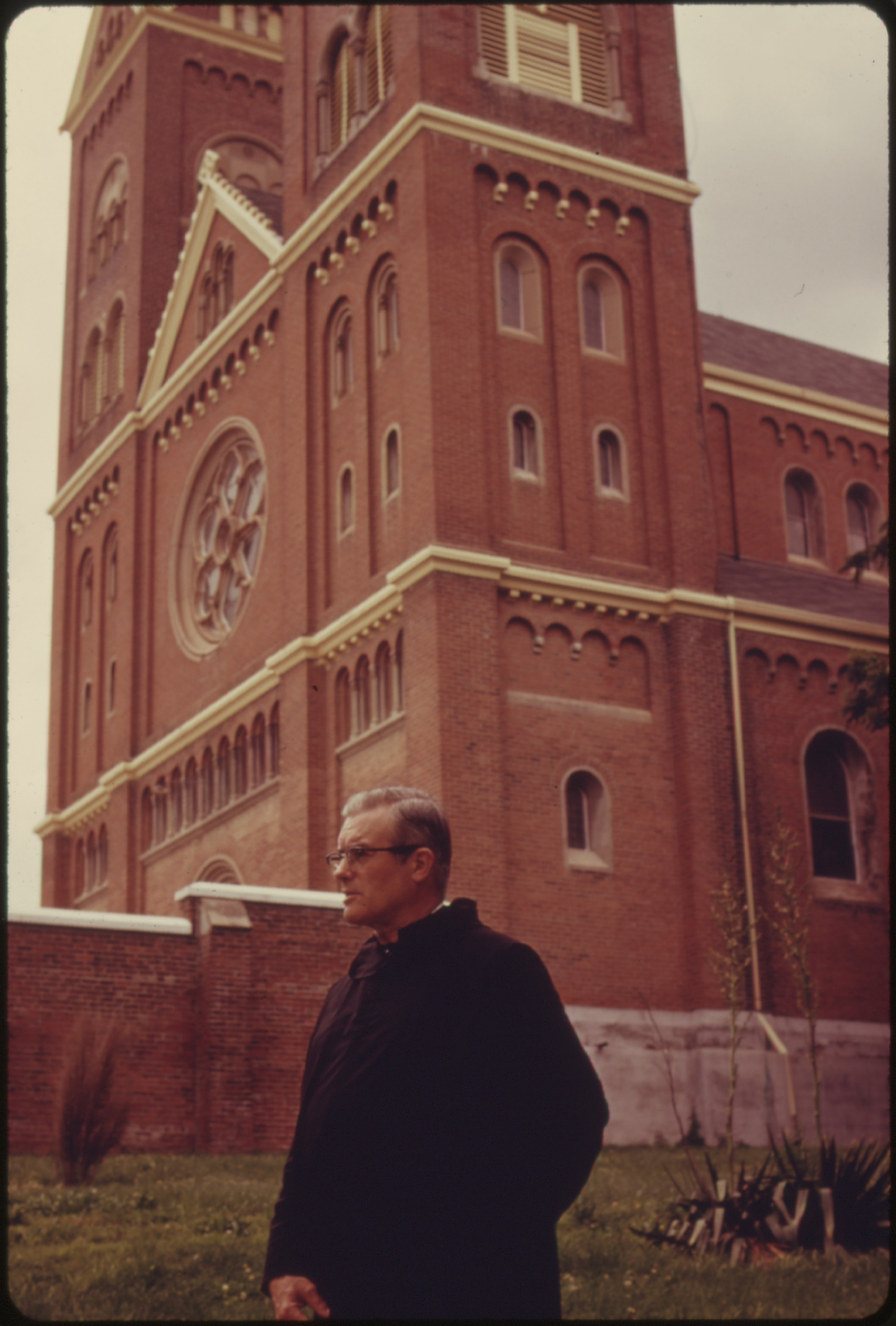
Father Eugene Dehner, professor of biology, 1974

At the request of John Baptist Miège, Vicar Apostolic of Leavenworth, two Benedictine monks arrived in Atchison from Doniphan and opened St. Benedict's College, a boarding school, in 1858. It was named for Benedict of Nursia, founder of modern western monasticism. The mainly classical school curriculum was intended to prepare students for the priesthood. The monks, who had recently arrived in the Kansas Territory, then moved their community to Atchison and founded the present-day St. Benedict's Abbey. It expanded to include commerce subjects to cater to the needs of the local population, which was primarily pioneers and settlers. Over the years the college continued to expand and by 1927 it was an accredited four-year liberal arts college.

In 1863, the Benedictine Sisters of Mount St. Scholastica, whose namesake is Benedict of Nursia's twin sister Scholastica, arrived in Atchison and founded St. Scholastica's Academy (now Maur Hill–Mount Academy) for local young women. In 1924, Mount St. Scholastica's Junior College was opened so these young women could continue their tertiary education. It became a senior college in 1932 and was authorized to confer bachelor degrees.

In 1970, Alcuin Hemmen, president of St. Benedict's College, announced that St. Benedict's would become a co-educational college. Mary Noel Walter, president of Mount St. Scholastica College, had been proposing a merger of the two colleges for over a year. Following Alcuin's announcement, Walter organized discussion of a merger. It was agreed upon, and the universities merged on July 1, 1971, to form the current Benedictine College. The separate colleges' corporations remain in existence for scholarships and land ownership purposes and allowed the newly formed college a free 50-year lease of the separate colleges' facilities on their campuses. Benedictine College terminated the lease of the facilities from Mount St. Scholastica College on October 1, 1989, amidst financial hardship. It continues to lease property from St. Benedict's College.

=== Presidents ===
- Mary Noel Walter (Acting, July 1, 1971, to February 12, 1972)
- Gerard Senecal (February 12, 1972, to May 29, 1987)
- Katherine Delaney (Acting, May 29, 1987, to 1988)
- Thomas O. James (1988 to 1995)
- Daniel J. Carey (1995 to 2003)
- Stephen D. Minnis (2004 to present)

== Academics ==
The most popular majors at Benedictine are Business, Education, and Theology. Commerce, teaching, and the faith are historically significant interests of both the college and the Benedictine order.

The School of Business offers bachelor's degrees and an MBA degree. Similarly, the Education Department offers undergraduate licensure programs and a Master of Arts.

The college's theology department grew out of St. Benedict's Abbey School of Theology and is the result of a 2007 shift from a Religious Studies program to a Catholic Theology program. All Theology professors are to have signed the canon-law mandatum as implemented by the U.S. bishops, and to take the oath of fidelity. The National Catholic Register's Catholic Identity College Guide notes that the president has made a public profession of faith and taken the oath of fidelity; the majority of the board of trustees are Catholic and the school's mandatum requirement is public. According to the Cardinal Newman Society's "The Newman Guide to Choosing a Catholic College" guide, the theology department shares the college's institutional commitment to the magisterium of the Catholic Church.

In 2010, Benedictine College added an Engineering Department in which students earn ABET-accredited degrees. The following year, the college added a nursing program dedicated to Mother Teresa of Calcutta who once visited Mount St. Scholastica in Atchison. The college's architecture major, stressing classical styles, debuted in 2016.

The college's Discovery Program gives students the opportunity to create and present original projects in any discipline. In 2010, Discovery Day included 80 presentations featuring the works of 145 students, 40 faculty/staff members, and 18 academic departments; "more than 1800 students have participated in Benedictine’s Discovery Day events since its inception in 1996. In that time, most faculty members and academic departments have taken an active role in sponsoring student projects."

=== Performing arts ===
The college offers programs in the performing arts, including theatre, dance, and music. The college features two performance spaces: the Mabee Theatre seats approximately 130 and the O'Malley-McAllister Auditorium seats around 545 people. The Abbey Church and St. Scholastica chapel at Mount St. Scholastica Monastery are also utilized for organ recitals, orchestra, and choral performances.

The college's music department traces its roots to Mount St. Scholastica Academy, now Maur Hill–Mount Academy, when in 1863 the Benedictine sisters were said to have first purchased a house and then a piano. The music department of the college was one of the first cooperative departments between the former two colleges, having been formed in 1964.

== Faith life ==
Mass is offered to students three times daily in several places, including St. Benedict's Abbey in its Abbey Church, St. Benedict's Church (a parish connected to one of the campus dorms, Elizabeth Hall), and Guadalupe chapel (located in the Abbey Crypt under the main church). The Fellowship of Catholic University Students (FOCUS), a Catholic collegiate leadership apostolate, was founded at Benedictine College by Curtis Martin. Other active religious groups on campus include Communion and Liberation, Pax Christi, Ravens Respect Life, a Knights of Columbus council, Partners in Prayer (in conjunction with Mount St. Scholastica), Great Adventure Bible Timeline, Fellowship of Christian Athletes, Households and Varsity Catholic.

The college hosts pilgrimages to Rome and the Holy Land as well as local pilgrimage sites.

Campus worship opportunities including Life of Prayer, adoration of the Blessed Sacrament, traditional Catholic processions and Guadalupe Day. Many students participate in perpetual adoration at St. Benedict's Parish on the edge of campus. The Chaplet of Divine Mercy is recited weekly. A daily rosary was added at the campus grotto to commemorate the 100th anniversary of the Marian apparitions at Fatima. The president leads the rosary weekly in the chapel.

Students are invited to pray the Divine Office with the monks in St. Benedict's Abbey or the sisters of Mount St. Scholastica Monastery. Lectio Divina is also offered at the Mount.

There are several places of prayer on or adjacent to campus: St. Martin's Chapel, St. Benedict's Abbey Church, Outdoor Stations of the Cross, Guadalupe Chapel, and St. Joseph Chapel in the Abbey. Retreats, conferences, and performances that college ministry offers to students includes "Jam for the Lamb", and BC Koinonia.

The school built Mary's Grotto, located in the center of campus, and Archbishop Joseph Naumann dedicated it in 2009. It is one of three outdoor devotional spaces dedicated to Mary located on the campus. The grotto is the site of the May Crowning "send-off" of student vocations to the priesthood and religious life. The college is located within the Archdiocese of Kansas City in Kansas, though it is not operated by the Archdiocese.

In 2014, the school renamed its student union the St. John Paul II Student Center on the day of Canonization of Pope John XXIII and Pope John Paul II.

== Campus ==
It is located on bluffs overlooking the Missouri River.

== Athletics ==
The Benedictine athletic teams are called the Ravens. The university is a member of the National Association of Intercollegiate Athletics (NAIA), primarily competing in the Heart of America Athletic Conference (HAAC) since the 1991–92 academic year. The Ravens previously competed as an NAIA Independent from 1962–63 to 1990–91; in the Central Intercollegiate Athletic Conference (CIC) from 1937–38 to 1961–62; as an Independent from January 1929 (during the 1928–29 school year) to 1936–37; and in the Kansas Collegiate Athletic Conference (KCAC) from 1902–03 to 1927–28.

Benedictine competes in 20 intercollegiate varsity sports. Men's sports include baseball, basketball, cross country, football, lacrosse, soccer, track & field (indoor and outdoor), and wrestling; women's sports include basketball, cross country, lacrosse, soccer, softball, track & field (indoor and outdoor), and volleyball; and co-ed sports include cheerleading, dance, Athletic Band, and spirit squad.

=== Mascot ===
The mascot "Rocky the Raven" is associated with St. Benedict, as legend has it a raven would bring the sixth-century saint food during his time as a hermit in the mountains near Subiaco, Italy. The legend also has the raven saving St. Benedict from eating poisoned bread.

== Notable alumni ==
- John Brungardt (1980) – 6th Bishop of Dodge City, Kansas
- Irv Comp (1942) – professional football player
- Andrew Cozzens (1996) – Catholic bishop
- Cyril Fountain (1953) – Chief Justice of the Bahamas from 1995 to 1996
- Terrance Gainer (1969) – Sergeant-at-Arms of the U.S. Senate for the 110th United States Congress (January 4, 2007 – May 2, 2014)
- Patrick Gallagher (1981) – 16th Chancellor of the University of Pittsburgh, formerly 13th Director of NIST, and acting Deputy Secretary of Commerce
- Lt. General Arthur Gregg (1964) – first African-American lieutenant general
- Terry Hanson (1969) – college athlete and coach
- Thomas Hoenig (1968?) – president, Federal Reserve Bank of Kansas City
- David Koechner – actor
- Wangari Maathai (1964) – Nobel Peace Prize winner (2004)
- Kyle Marquart – politician
- Jamie Mueller (1987) – professional football player
- Donn Murphy (1952) – professor of theatre at Georgetown University and president of The National Theatre in Washington, DC
- Chris Rutt (1881) – inventor of Aunt Jemima pancake mix
- Joseph Teasdale (1954) – Governor of Missouri (1977–1981), member of 1954 NAIA National Championship basketball team
- Bob Veale (1958) – professional baseball player
- Frank Wilcox (1933) – film and television actor, later Benedictine trustee
- Kate Zackary (2011) – rugby sevens player
