= College flag football =

Form of flag football

- Governing body: NCAA; NAIA; NJCAA
- First played: 2021

College flag football is the sport of flag football played by student-athletes at colleges and universities. The National Association of Intercollegiate Athletics (NAIA) was the first college governing body in the U.S. to sanction flag football as a varsity women's sport in 2021.

== History ==
The CONADEIP began crowning a national champion in flag football in 2011. The sport made its debut on the Universiada Nacional programme in 2018, alongside rugby sevens and sport climbing.

The National Association of Intercollegiate Athletics (NAIA) partnered with the National Football League (NFL) to become the first college governing body in the U.S. to sanction flag football for female student-athletes at the varsity level. Ten teams took part in the inaugural NAIA tournament in the spring of 2021.

On September 8, 2023, the ITESM Santa Fe Campus Borregos, led by quarterback Diana Flores, defeated the three-time defending NAIA national champion Ottawa Braves by a score of 27–6 at NRG Stadium in Houston; the historic exhibition was held as part of the Mexican College Football Showcase.

The National Junior College Athletic Association (NJCAA) added the sport in the spring of 2023. The Atlantic East Conference of NCAA Division III became the first National Collegiate Athletic Association (NCAA) conference to sponsor the sport in the spring of 2025. Conference Carolinas, a member of NCAA Division II, added flag football in spring 2026. Following an NCAA recommendation, all three of its divisions voted at the January 2026 NCAA convention to add flag football to the organization's Emerging Sports for Women program, effective immediately. Similarly, U Sports will add women's flag football as a pilot sport beginning the 2027-28 season; it has been a varsity sport in Quebec's RSEQ since 2021.

== Champions ==
=== Mexico ===
==== CONADEIP ====
- 2011: ITESM Toluca
- 2012: UANL
- 2013: UANL (2)
- 2014: ITESM Toluca (2)
- 2015: ITESM Santa Fe
- 2016: ITESM Santa Fe (2)
- 2017: CETYS Tijuana
- 2018: ITESM Santa Fe (3)
- 2019: ITESM Santa Fe (4) MVP: Diana Flores
- 2020–21: Cancelled due to the COVID-19 pandemic
- 2022: ITESM Santa Fe (5)
- 2023: UVM Tlalpan
- 2024: ITESM Santa Fe (6)
- 2025: ITESM Santa Fe (7)

==== Universiada Nacional ====
List of Universiada Nacional flag football champions
| Ed. | Season | Date | Champion | Score | Runner-up | Location | Ref. |
|---|---|---|---|---|---|---|---|
| 1 | 2018 | May 2, 2018 | UANL | 33–19 | CETYS | Toluca | |
| 2 | 2019 | May 16, 2019 | UANL (2) | 27–7 | UABC | Mérida | |
| N/A | 2020–21 | Cancelled due to the COVID-19 pandemic | | | | | |
| 3 | 2022 | May 27, 2022 | UNAM | 32–26 | CETYS | Ciudad Juárez | |
| 4 | 2023 | June 14, 2023 | UNAM (2) | 38–7 | Anáhuac Cancún | Hermosillo | |
| 5 | 2024 | May 25, 2024 | ITESM Santa Fe | 21–20 | Anáhuac Cancún | Aguascalientes | |
| 6 | 2025 | June 6, 2025 | Anáhuac Querétaro | 25–6 | Anáhuac Cancún | Puebla | |

=== United States ===
==== NAIA ====
List of National Association of Intercollegiate Athletics flag football champions
| Ed. | Season | Date | Champion | Score | Runner-up | Location | Winning head coach | Ref. |
|---|---|---|---|---|---|---|---|---|
| 1 | 2021 | May 8, 2021 | Ottawa (KS) | 7–6 | Keiser | Atlanta, GA | Liz Sowers | |
| 2 | 2022 | May 14, 2022 | Ottawa (KS) (2) | 24–20 | Thomas | Atlanta, GA | Liz Sowers (2) | |
| 3 | 2023 | May 20, 2023 | Ottawa (KS) (3) | 18–13 | Thomas | Atlanta, GA | Liz Sowers (3) | |
| 4 | 2024 | May 10, 2024 | Ottawa (KS) (4) | 21–13 | Keiser | Atlanta, GA | Liz Sowers (4) | |
| 5 | 2025 | May 8, 2025 | Ottawa (KS) (5) | 34–20 | Keiser | Riverside, MO | Liz Sowers (5) | |
| 6 | 2026 | May 9, 2026 | Warner | 13–6 | Keiser | Bradenton, FL | Tim Mimbs | |

==== NJCAA ====
List of National Junior College Athletic Association flag football champions
| Ed. | Season | Date | Champion | Score | Runner-up | Location | Winning head coach | Ref. |
|---|---|---|---|---|---|---|---|---|
| 1 | 2023 | May 20, 2023 | Florida Gateway | 20–0 | Hesston | Atlanta, GA | Ricky Hufty | |
| 2 | 2024 | May 9, 2024 | Florida Gateway (2) | 26–13, 45–6 (Note: Best-of-three series) | Hesston | Atlanta, GA | Ricky Hufty (2) | |
| 3 | 2025 | May 8, 2025 | Florida Gateway (3) | 68–13 | Daytona State | Kansas City, KS | Ricky Hufty (3) | |
| 5 | 2026 | May 9, 2026 | Florida Gateway (4) | 53–13 | Daytona State | Glen Ellyn, IL | Ricky Hufty (4) | |

== See also ==
- College athletics in the United States
