= List of NAIA football seasons =

This is a list of NAIA (National Association of Intercollegiate Athletics) Division I football seasons from when the NAIA split its football championship into two divisions in 1970 until it consolidated back into a single championship in 1996. The NAIA added flag football as a women's varsity sport in 2021.

== Single division (1956–1969) ==
Year	National Champions	Coach of the Year
1956	Montana State & Saint Joseph's (IN)	
1957	Pittsburg State	
1958	Northwestern State (OK)	
1959	Texas A&I	
1960	Lenoir–Rhyne	
1961	Pittsburg State (2)	
1962	Central State (OK)	
1963	Saint John's (MN)	
1964	Concordia–Moorhead & Sam Houston State	
1965	Saint John's (MN) (2)	
1966	Waynesburg	
1967	Fairmont State	
1968	Troy State	
1969	Texas A&I (2)	

== Division I (1970–1996) ==
Year	NAIA Division I Champion	Coach of the Year
1970	Texas A&I (3)	
1971	Livingston	
1972	East Texas State	
1973	Abilene Christian	
1974	Texas A&I (4)	
1975	Texas A&I (5)	
1976	Texas A&I (6)	
1977	Abilene Christian (2)	
1978	Angelo State	
1979	Texas A&I (7)	Dick Strahm
1980	Elon	
1981	Elon (2)	
1982	Central State (OK) (2)	
1983	Carson–Newman	
1984	Carson–Newman (2) & Central Arkansas	
1985	Central Arkansas (2) & Hillsdale	
1986	Carson–Newman (3)	
1987	Cameron	
1988	Carson–Newman (4)	
1989	Carson–Newman (5)	
1990	Central State (OH)	
1991	Central Arkansas (3)	
1992	Findlay (OH) (2)	
1993	East Central (OK)	
1994	Northeastern State (OK) (2)	
1995	Central State (OH) (3)	Dick Strahm (2)
1996	Southwestern Oklahoma	

== Single division (1997–present) ==
Year	National Champions	Player of the Year	Coach of the Year
1997	Findlay (OH) (4)	Bo Hurley (QB), Findlay (OH)	Dick Strahm (3)
1998	Azusa Pacific	Jack Williams (RB), Azusa Pacific	Vic Shealy
1999	Northwestern Oklahoma	Eddie Eviston (QB), Georgetown (KY)	Tim Albin
2000	Georgetown (KY) (2)	Eddie Eviston (QB), Georgetown (KY) (2)	Bill Cronin
2001	Georgetown (KY) (3)	Eddie Eviston (QB), Georgetown (KY) (3)	Bill Cronin (2)
2002	Carroll	Nick Kortan (RB), Sioux Falls	Carl Poelker
2003	Carroll (2)	Tyler Emmert (QB), Carroll	Mike Van Diest
2004	Carroll (3)	Cory Jacquay (RB), Saint Francis (IN)	Kevin Donley (2)
2005	Carroll (4)	Tyler Emmert (QB), Carroll (2)	Mike Van Diest (2)
2006	Sioux Falls (2)	Brian Kurtz (LB), Saint Francis (IN)	Kalen DeBoer
2007	Carroll (5)	Chad Cavender (QB), Sioux Falls	Mike Van Diest (3)
2008	Sioux Falls (3)	Owen Koeppen (LB), Carroll	Kalen DeBoer (2)
2009	Sioux Falls (4)	Lorenzo Brown (QB), Sioux Falls	Kalen DeBoer (3)
2010	Carroll (6)	Jon Ryan (WR), Sioux Falls	Mike Van Diest (4)
2011	Saint Xavier	Chance Demarais (RB), Carroll	Mike Feminis
2012	Marian	Jimmy Coy (QB), Saint Xavier	Steve Ryan
2013	Grand View	Kyle Schuck (WR), Morningside	Mike Woodley
2014	Southern Oregon	Austin Dodge (QB), Southern Oregon	Mark Henninger
2015	Marian (2)	Ryan Kasdorf (QB), Morningside	Mark Henninger (2)
2016	Saint Francis (IN)	Logan Brettell (QB), Baker	Kevin Donley (3)
2017	Saint Francis (IN) (2)	Nick Ferrer (QB), Saint Francis (IN)	Kevin Donley (4)
2018	Morningside	Trent Solsma (QB), Morningside	Steve Ryan (2)
2019	Morningside (2)	Charles Salary (RB), Marian (IN)	Steve Ryan (3)
2020	Lindsey Wilson	Tyson Kooima (QB), Northwestern (IA)	Chris Oliver
2021	Morningside (3)	Joe Dolincheck (QB), Morningside	Steve Ryan (4)
2022	Northwestern (IA)	Joe Dolincheck (QB), Morningside (2)	Matt McCarty
2023	Keiser	Jalyn Gramstad (QB), Northwestern (IA)	Doug Socha
2024	Grand View (2)	Jackson Waring (QB), Grand View	Myles Russ
2025	Grand View (3)	Jackson Waring (QB), Grand View	Joel Osborn
2026			

== Women's flag football (2021–present) ==
Year	National Champions
2021	Ottawa (KS)
2022	Ottawa (KS) (2)
2023	Ottawa (KS) (3)
2024	Ottawa (KS) (4)
2025	Ottawa (KS) (5)
2026	Warner

== See also ==
- List of NCAA Division I-A/FBS football seasons
- List of NCAA Division I-AA/FCS football seasons
- List of NCAA Division II football seasons
- List of NCAA Division III football seasons
