= Addison Orsborn =

American flag football player (born 2003)

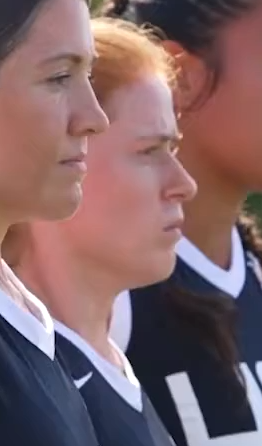
- Orsborn in 2023

Personal information
- Born: 2003 (age 22–23)
- Home town: Round Rock, Texas, U.S.
- Height: 5 ft 5 in (165 cm)

Sport
- Country: United States
- Sport: Flag football
- Position: Rusher, wide receiver
Medal record
Women's flag football
Representing United States
World Games
| Silver medal – second place | 2025 Chengdu | Team |
IFAF World Championship
| Gold medal – first place | 2024 Lahti | Team |
IFAF Americas Continental Championship
| Gold medal – first place | 2023 Charlotte | Team |
| Bronze medal – third place | 2025 Penonomé | Team |

Addison Orsborn (born 2003) is an American international flag football player. She has represented the United States national team since 2023, winning the 2024 IFAF Women's Flag Football World Championship. She plays college flag football for the Ottawa Braves, winning four consecutive NAIA national championships.

== Early life ==
Orsborn grew up in Round Rock, Texas, the daughter of Steve Orsborn and Michele Fox. She began playing flag football with boys when she was eight years old and also played soccer and basketball growing up. With flag football not yet a varsity sport in Texas, she played basketball and baseball at Meridian High School. She played club flag football for Texas Fury alongside future US teammate Ashlea Klam. She was recruited to play college flag football for the Ottawa Braves under head coach Liz Sowers.

== College career ==
Orsborn jointly led the Ottawa Braves in receptions as a freshman in 2022, catching eight touchdowns while running for five more. She was named first-team All-KCAC as a screen blocker and second-team All-KCAC as a running back. She led the team in combined rushing/receiving yards in the 2022 NAIA championship, helping Ottawa win 24–20 against Thomas University to claim their second consecutive national title, and was named championship MVP. She was named first-team All-KCAC as a utility player as a sophomore in 2023, recording four touchdown catches and one rushing. She was Ottawa's leading receiver in the two-game 2023 NAIA championship series, catching the winning touchdown in the decisive 18–13 rematch win over Thomas to earn her second national title.

Orsborn was named first-team All-KCAC at running back while she caught three touchdowns as a junior in 2024. She had one touchdown in the 21–13 win against Keiser University in the 2024 NAIA championship, winning her third title and being named in the all-tournament team. She caught a career-high ten touchdowns and added three rushing as a senior in 2025, earning first-team All-KCAC honors for the fourth time in four years. After posting two touchdowns in the semifinals against Thomas, she had another two in the 34–20 rematch win over Keiser in the 2025 NAIA championship, helping Ottawa win their fifth straight title and conclude the season with a perfect 23–0 record.

== National team career ==
Orsborn made her debut for the United States national team at the 2023 IFAF Americas Continental Flag Football Championship in Charlotte, North Carolina, defeating Mexico 26–21 in the final. Her college coach Liz Sowers was a national team assistant coach at the time. She then helped the United States to their third consecutive world title at the 2024 IFAF Women's Flag Football World Championship in Finland, winning 31–18 against Mexico in the final. Playing as a blitzer, she earned a silver medal at the 2025 World Games in China after losing 26–21 to Mexico in the final. Later that year, she suffered an anterior cruciate ligament injury during the 2025 IFAF Americas Continental Flag Football Championship in Panama, where the US settled for bronze after another loss to Mexico.
