= John D. Marshall =

John D. Marshall may refer to:

- John Marshall (entrepreneur), American entrepreneur and inventor
- John D. Marshall (American football) (1930–2008), American football and tennis coach, college athletics administrator
