= Orsborn =

Orsborn is a surname. Notable people with the surname include:

- Addison Orsborn (born 2003), American flag football player
- Albert Orsborn (1886–1967), British Salvationist
- Chuck Orsborn (1917–2017), American basketball player, head coach, and athletic director
