= Arthur Willis =

Arthur Willis may refer to:

- Arthur Willis (footballer) (1920–1987), English footballer
- Arthur J. Willis, American college football coach
- Arthur Willis (athlete) (1893–1979), British athlete and Anglican clergyman

== See also ==
- Arthur Jones (American football) (Arthur Willis Jones III, 1986–2025), American football player
- Frederick Willis (British Army officer) (Frederick Arthur Willis, 1827–1899), British Army general
