= Two Roosters Ice Cream =

Ice cream parlor in North Carolina

Coordinates: 35.9519°N 78.5274°W

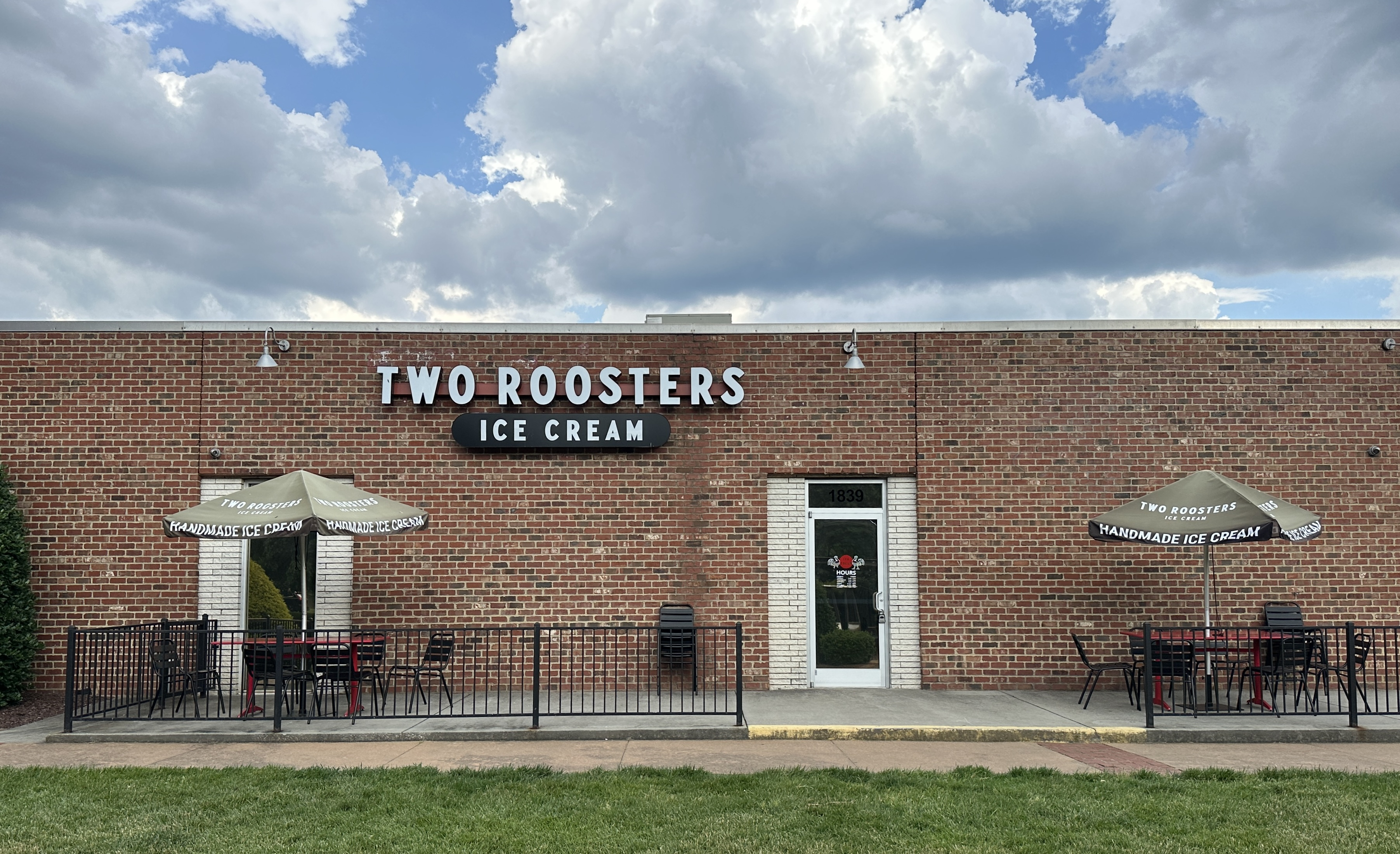
- Two Roosters Ice Cream parlor location at The Factory in Wake Forest, North Carolina
- Company type: Ice cream parlor
- Industry: Ice cream
- Founded: March 2015; 11 years ago in Raleigh, North Carolina, U.S.
- Founder: Jared Plummer
- Number of locations: 6 (2024)
- Area served: Raleigh; Durham; Wake Forest; Cary
- Website: tworoosters.com

Two Roosters Ice Cream is an ice cream parlor founded in Raleigh, North Carolina, United States, with six locations located around The Research Triangle. Founded by NC State alumnus Jared Plummer, the parlor began operations in March 2015 out of a travel trailer-turned ice cream truck. By serving non-traditional flavors like grilled cheese and pizza, Plummer gained the public support and funds to open his first brick and mortar location in Raleigh in 2017. In subsequent years, other locations have been opened as recently as October 2024 in Durham, Wake Forest, and Cary.

Alongside eleven permanent flavors, the parlor rotates through several seasonal flavors of ice cream, which are either picked by the parlor or decided in guest collaborations. The parlor has won the award for "best local ice cream" four times in the annual WRAL Voter's Choice Awards and was named one of the best ice cream parlors in the nation by USA Today in 2019 and 2023.

== Menu ==
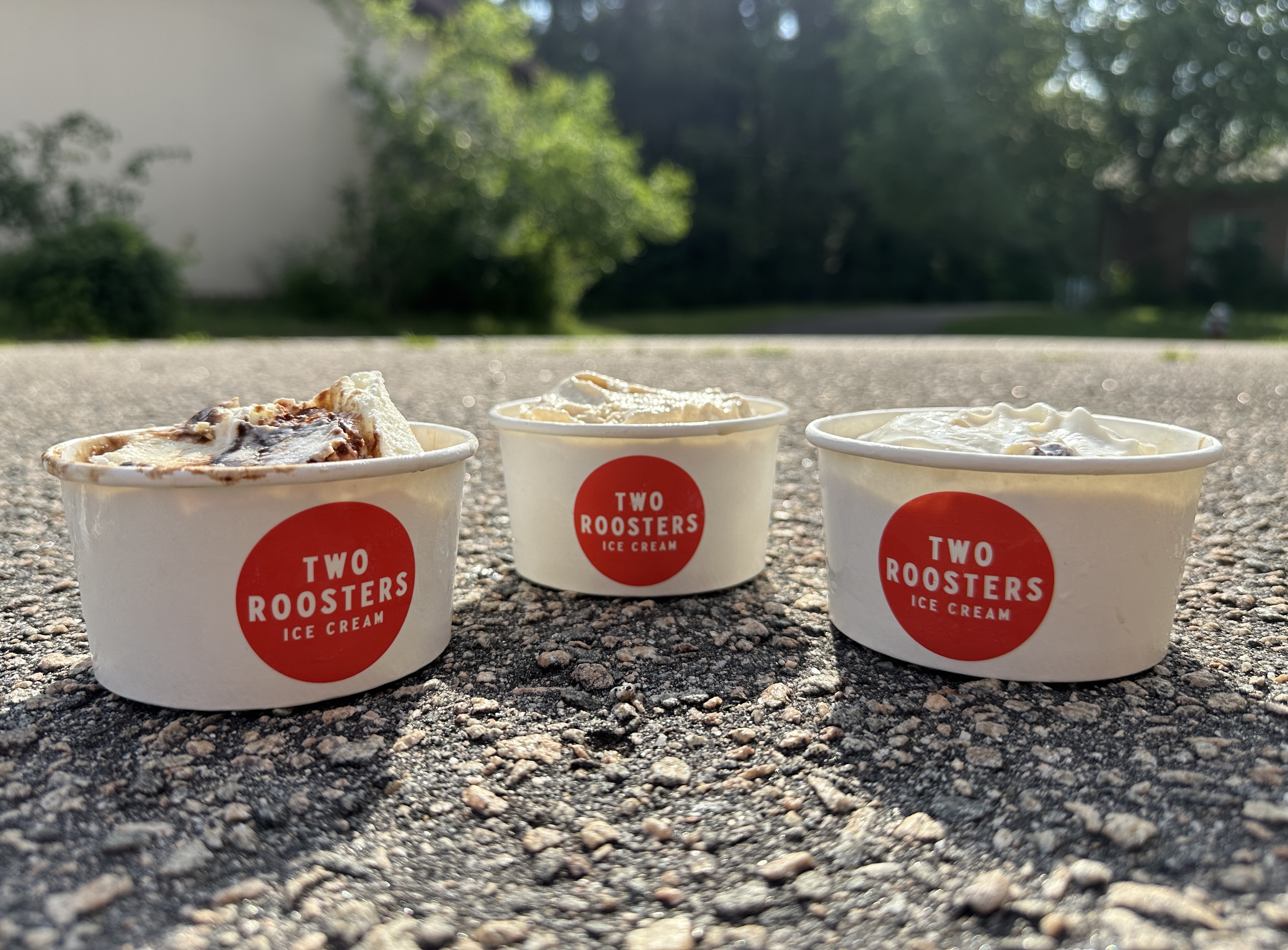
Cups of Two Roosters Ice Cream: Tiramisu (left), Coffee Bourbon (middle), and Sea Salt Chip Cookie Dough (right)

The parlor has eleven "forever flavors" of ice cream that do not change seasonally, some of which have dairy-free options. On top of these, a series of new ice cream flavors is released monthly, which are either chosen by the parlor or in guest collaborations. An annually recurring collaboration is the "kid chef" contest, where children submit ideas for ice cream flavors, with the top six making up the next monthly series. These flavors are chosen to celebrate specific seasons or themes, such as Ice Cream for Breakfast Day in February or Cracker Jacks-flavored ice cream for baseball season.

Flavors including 'cobbler', 'doughnuts', 'sea salt chip cookie dough', 'strawberry shortbread', and more exotic flavors including 'blackberry hibiscus', 'bourbon peach cookie', 'coffee bourbon', 'grilled cheese', 'margarita', and 'pizza', have historically been served. Some flavors came from collaborations with local restaurants, including 'bananas foster' with the Indian and Asian cuisine restaurant Garland, 'malted chocolate, ginger, and sorghum' with the pop-up diner Snap Pea Underground, and 'SOLA Coffee mini doughnuts with homemade cinnamon syrup', with the coffee shop SOLA Coffee. The parlor has also run promotions with the Carolina Hurricanes and NC State Wolfpack men's basketball.

== History ==
=== Founding ===
"To me, it's like, 'How can we take these classic things that people are used to and tweak them just slightly, so they're still familiar, but yet different from the next person down the street?'"

— Founder Jared Plummer, from an interview with The News & Observer about how the business began to grow with new flavors

Founder Jared Plummer was inspired to start an ice cream parlor from his childhood experience churning ice cream with his neighbors at his grandmother's house. Both sides of the house's doorway had black wooden roosters, which inspired the parlor's name. Plummer attended North Carolina State University, where he studied at the Poole College of Management. At college, he received a Bachelor of Science in accounting and business in 2005 and a Master of Accounting in 2007. After earning his Masters, Plummer worked as a public accountant for eight years before he rediscovered his passion for ice cream. In a 2021 Poole College interview, Plummer stated that working as an accountant helped him feel confident starting his own business.

Beginning operations in March 2015, Plummer first used a turquoise and white travel trailer-turned-ice cream truck attached to a Ford F-100. Plummer drove the truck to festivals and outside breweries to promote the business but often remained parked outside The Cookery restaurant in Durham. The business grew in popularity by offering non-traditional flavors like grilled cheese and pizza, allowing Plummer to move the business in 2017 into its first brick and mortar location at the Greystone Village Shopping Center in North Raleigh. After the first location was opened, the ice cream truck catered for events like weddings around The Research Triangle. The parlor's first menu consisted of what Plummer considered the most popular flavors when operating the truck.

=== Growth and expansion ===
In 2018, the parlor opened a pop-up location on Person Street Plaza in downtown Raleigh, which became a permanent location after becoming locally popular. In 2020, the parlor opened its third location at the Golden Belt Campus in Durham. On July 6, 2021, the parlor opened its fourth location in Raleigh, and on August 12, 2023, it opened its fifth location in total, being the first in Wake Forest at The Factory off South Main Street.

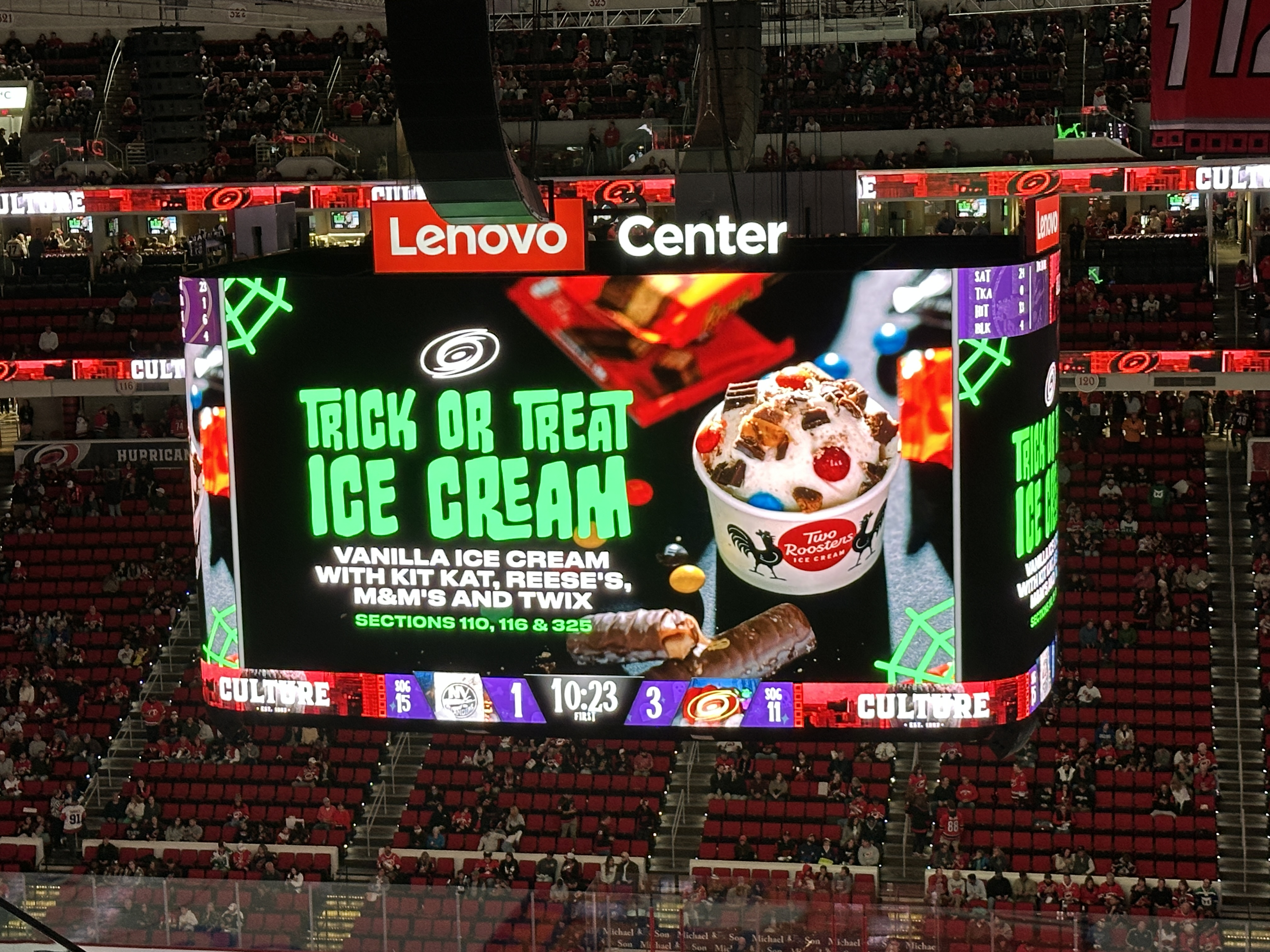
An advertisement for their three booths at Lenovo Center during a Carolina Hurricanes game

Between late 2023 and early 2024, the parlor began to operate two small locations inside the PNC Arena in Raleigh, with a stand located at Section 116 and a cart at Section 110. Around the time PNC Arena was rebranded to Lenovo Center in October 2024, the an additional location was opened at Section 325. In June 2024, the parlor announced plans to open a sixth location at the Waverly Place Shopping Center in Cary. The location opened on October 5, 2024, with the first 100 customers getting free ice cream. For the 2025 football season, a pair of stands were opened at Wallace Wade Stadium offering Duke University-specific flavors, and for the same year's baseball season, another stand was opened at Durham Bulls Athletic Park. Despite recent expansions, Plummer stated he had no intention of making the business national, opting to stay in the Raleigh metro area where he started and embracing the friendly rivalry against other local parlors, including Andia's Ice Cream and FRESH. Local Ice Cream.

== Reception ==
The parlor won the WRAL annual Voter's Choice Awards category for the best local ice cream or frozen yogurt in 2019, 2020, 2021, 2023, and 2024, and won second place in 2022 and 2025. During CONECON 2024, an annual conference hosted by the North American Ice Cream Association, the parlor won two second place awards in the regular ice cream and non-dairy frozen dessert categories for their 'Earl Grey and lemon cookie dough' and 'non-dairy cookie butter' flavors respectively. The parlor was named one of the best ice cream parlors in the nation in the USA Today 10Best Readers' Choice Awards in 2019 and 2023, placing eighth in 2023.
