= 2026 NAIA flag football season =

- Total No. of teams: 34
- Regular season: January 21 – April 23, 2026
- National championship: IMG Academy; Bradenton, FL; May 7–9, 2026
- Champion: Warner

The 2026 NAIA flag football season was the component of the 2026 college football season organized by the National Association of Intercollegiate Athletics (NAIA) in the United States. It was the sixth season of the NAIA sponsoring flag football as a varsity women's sport, in contrast with traditional, full-contact college football which is played almost exclusively by men. With 34 schools playing in this season, it remained classified as an "emerging" sport by the NAIA. The postseason tournament was moved to the IMG Academy for this season. The Warner Royals won their first championship with a 13–6 victory over the Keiser Seahawks, completing an undefeated season. This was the first season that Ottawa (KS) failed to win the championship, having won the inaugural five championships.

During this season, Warner quarterback Kathryn Hutchinson set NAIA single season records for touchdown passes, completions and passing yards.

== Standings ==
School	Record
Warner	24–0
Milligan	23–1
Ottawa (KS)	17–3
Hope International	13–4
Lindsey Wilson (KY)	13–4
Keiser	16–5
Baker	15–5
Kansas Wesleyan	14–5
Saint Francis	15–6
La Sierra	10–5
Life	11–6
Midland	11–6
Webber International	11–6
St. Thomas (FL)	11–7
Thomas	10–7
Siena Heights	18–15
Southwestern (KS)	7–6
Graceland	10–10
Arizona Christian	7–7
Campbellsville	8–11
Cottey	6–9
Point	6–9
Texas Wesleyan	4–6
Cumberland (TN)	8–15
William Woods	4–8
Reinhardt	6–13
St. Mary (KS)	4–9
Simpson	3–8
Benedictine Mesa	3–9
Hesston College	3–10
Brewton–Parker	3–13
Florida Memorial	2–13
OUAZ	1–14
Bethel (KS)	0–11

== Rankings ==
The top 10 from the NAIA Coaches' Poll

=== Preseason poll ===
Ranking	Team
1	Ottawa (KS) (7)
2	Keiser (1)
3	Warner
4	Baker
5	St. Thomas (FL)
6	Kansas Wesleyan
7	Webber International
8	Thomas
9	Milligan
10	Life

== Postseason ==
=== NAIA Women's Flag Football Invitational ===
==== Playoff participants ====
Team	Conference	Record	Qualification method
Baker	Kansas Collegiate Athletic Conference	14–3 (8–2)	At-large
Hope International	Great Southwest Athletic Conference	13–2 (10–0)	Automatic qualifier
Kansas Wesleyan	Kansas Collegiate Athletic Conference	11–3 (8–2)	At-large
Keiser	Sun Conference	13–3 (8–1)	At-large
Ottawa (KS)	Kansas Collegiate Athletic Conference	15–1 (10–0)	Automatic qualifier
Saint Francis	NAIA East Region	13–4	Automatic qualifier
St. Thomas (FL)	Sun Conference	11–5 (7–3)	At-large
Warner	Sun Conference	20–0 (10–0)	Automatic qualifier

==== Bracket ====
Upper round 1	Upper round 2	Upper final	Final
1	Warner	46
8	Saint Francis	6
1	Warner	33
5	Baker	19
4	Hope International	13
5	Baker	43
1	Warner	13
3	Keiser	7
2	Ottawa (KS)	20
7	St. Thomas (FL)	15
2	Ottawa (KS)	13
3	Keiser	20
3	Keiser	34	May 9 – IMG Academy
6	Kansas Wesleyan	26	1	Warner	13
3	Keiser	6
Lower round 1	Lower round 2	Lower round 3	Lower final
2	Ottawa (KS)	35
8	Saint Francis	38	8	Saint Francis	13	3	Keiser	47
4	Hope International	32	2	Ottawa (KS)	13	6	Kansas Wesleyan	28
6	Kansas Wesleyan	19
5	Baker	35
7	St. Thomas (FL)	26	6	Kansas Wesleyan	53
6	Kansas Wesleyan	34
