= Livingstone Blue Bears football =

- First season: 1892; 134 years ago
- Athletic director: Clifton Huff
- Head coach: Sean Gilbert; 4th season, 15–24 (.385)
- Location: Salisbury, North Carolina, U.S.
- Stadium: Alumni Memorial Stadium (capacity: 6,000)
- NCAA division: Division II
- Conference: CIAA
- Colors: Columbia blue and black

Conference championships
- 3 (1960, 1997, 1998)
- Mascot: Blue Bear
- Marching band: Marching Blue Bear Band
- Outfitter: Under Armour
- Website: bluebearathletics.com

The Livingstone Blue Bears football program is an intercollegiate American football team for Livingstone College located in Salisbury, North Carolina. The team competes in NCAA Division II as a member of the Central Intercollegiate Athletic Association (CIAA). The school's first team was fielded in 1892 as the first historically black college to play football. The team plays its home games at Alumni Memorial Stadium.

== History ==
=== 1892: founding ===
The Livingstone Blue Bears football team was founded in the fall of 1892. The members of the team all chipped in and purchased the first uniforms. They played their first game against Biddle on their front lawn, marking the first time two historically black colleges and universities (HBCUs) faced off for a football game. They played two 45-minute halves with Biddle winning 5–0. They have since made a rivalry named the "Commemorative Classic" which is played every year.

=== 1883–1930: early years ===
In 1903, the Blue Bears were featured in The Charlotte Observer, which stated: "Livingstone has defeated all comers this year, and claims the championship of the colored colleges of the state". They finished that season with a known record of 3–0, defeating Bennett College twice and Y.M.I. once.

In 1906, the Livingstone self-proclaimed themselves "The Colored College Champions" under head coach Benjamin Butler Church.

In 1913, Livingstone finished the season with a 5–0 record, their second and final undefeated season in school history.

In 1926, the Blue Bears finished the season with a 2–5 record. This would be their last season under Church before James Meeks took over in 1927. Church finished with a 42–20–9 during his 16 seasons with Livingstone.

=== 1931–1973: reclassification ===
The Blue Bears were Southern Independents from 1892 to 1930, joining the Colored Intercollegiate Athletic Association (now the Central Intercollegiate Athletic Association) in 1931, finishing that season 0–5–3 (0–3–2).

In 1973, Livingstone College reclassified from the National Association of Intercollegiate Athletics (NAIA) to the National Collegiate Athletic Association (NCAA) Division II along with the CIAA. They would finish the season 7–2–1.

=== 1974–present ===
In 1992, the 1892 football team was inducted into the Livingstone College Athletics Hall of Fame.

In 1994, the Blue Bears hired Rudy Abrams, a Livingstone alumni, as their head coach. In 1997, he led them to an 8–2 (6–2) regular season record and a CIAA co-championship before losing in the inaugural Pioneer Bowl to Kentucky State, 30–26. In 1998, he led them to another CIAA co-championship with a 7–3 (6–2) regular season record before again losing in the Pioneer Bowl, this time to Tuckegee, 23–9. After the 1998 season, Abrams was hired to be the head football coach of the North Carolina Central Eagles, where he coached for four seasons before retiring in 2002. He finished his tenure at Livingstone with a 33–18–1 record. In 2005, Abrams was inducted into the Livingstone College Athletics Hall of Fame.

In 2006, Tony Veal was inducted into the Livingstone College Athletics Hall of Fame.

In 2019, Charles Cooley and Michael Posey were inducted into the Livingstone College Athletics Hall of Fame.

In 2020, Livingstone hired 1992 third overall pick, Sean Gilbert, as their new head football coach. His first season would be cancelled after the 2020 COVID-19 pandemic. In his second season (first full) as head coach, Gilbert finished with a 1–8 (1–5) record.

== Affiliations ==
=== Classifications ===
- 1892–1962: NCAA College Division – Small College
- 1963–1972: NAIA Division I
- 1973–present: NCAA Division II

=== Conference memberships ===
- 1892–1930: independent
- 1931: Colored Intercollegiate Athletic Association
- 1946–1961: Eastern Intercollegiate Athletic Conference
- 1962–present: Central Intercollegiate Athletic Association

== Championships ==
=== Conference ===
Season	Conference	Coach	Overall record	Conference record
1960†	Eastern Intercollegiate Athletic Conference	Charles R. Cox	7–2–2	5–0–1
1997†	Central Intercollegiate Athletic Association	Rudy Abrams	8–3	5–2
1998†	Central Intercollegiate Athletic Association	Rudy Abrams	7–4	5–2

† Co-champion

== Season-by-season records ==
= National champions
= Conference champions
= Conference co-champions
= Conference division champions and championship game berth
= Undefeated season

Year	Coach	Overall	Conference	Standing
1892	Unknown	0–1	N/A	N/A
1893	No team			
1894	No team			
1895	No team			
1896	No team			
1897	No team			
1898	No team			
1899	No team			
1900	No team			
1901	Unknown	3–0	N/A	N/A
1902	No team			
1903	Unknown	3–0	N/A	N/A
1904	No team			
1905	Unknown	1–0	N/A	N/A
1906	Benjamin Butler Church	4–0–1	N/A	N/A
1907	Benjamin Butler Church	0–1	N/A	N/A
1908	Benjamin Butler Church	1–0	N/A	N/A
1909	Benjamin Butler Church	0–1	N/A	N/A
1910	No team			
1911	No team			
1912	Benjamin Butler Church	3–1–1	N/A	N/A
1913	Benjamin Butler Church	5–0	N/A	N/A
1914	Benjamin Butler Church	5–1	N/A	N/A
1915	Benjamin Butler Church	3–0–2	N/A	N/A
1916	Benjamin Butler Church	2–2	N/A	N/A
1917	No team			
1918	No team			
1919	No team			
1920	Benjamin Butler Church	1–0	N/A	N/A
1921	Benjamin Butler Church	1–0–1	N/A	N/A
1922	Benjamin Butler Church	5–1–1	N/A	N/A
1923	Benjamin Butler Church	3–2–2	N/A	N/A
1924	Benjamin Butler Church	3–3–1	N/A	N/A
1925	Benjamin Butler Church	4–3–1	N/A	N/A
1926	Benjamin Butler Church	2–5	N/A	N/A
1927	James Meeks	3–3–1	N/A	N/A
1928	James Meeks	3–3–1	N/A	N/A
1929	James Meeks	3–3–3	N/A	N/A
1930	Arthur J. Willis	0–7–2	N/A	N/A
Colored Intercollegiate Athletic Association (1931)
1931	Bertrand C. Jacobs	0–5–3	0–3–2	11th
1932	William Reid	0–4	---	---
1933	Unknown	0–1	---	---
1934	Harry Parker	1–5	---	---
1935	Robert Gill	0–4	---	---
1936	Samuel E. Barnes	2–6–1	---	---
1937	Samuel E. Barnes	2–5	---	---
1938	Samuel E. Barnes	3–4–1	---	---
1939	Samuel E. Barnes	3–5–1	---	---
1940	Samuel E. Barnes	4–2–2	---	---
1941	Benjamin Hargroves	2–6	---	---
1942	No team			
1943	Unknown	0–3	---	---
1944	Unknown	0–2	---	---
1945	No team			
Eastern Intercollegiate Athletic Conference (1946–1961)
1946	William Goodrum	0–5	---	---
1947	William Goodrum	2–5	---	---
1948	Maurice Sneed	2–7	2–3	5th
1949	Edward L. Mitchell	2–4	1–4	T–6th
1950	Edward L. Mitchell	0–6–1	0–4	T–7th
1951	Luther Green	0–4–2	---	---
1952	Edward L. Mitchell	3–4	2–3	4th
1953	Edward L. Mitchell	3–4	1–3	4th
1954	Edward L. Mitchell	5–2	2–1	2nd
1955	Edward L. Mitchell	2–6	1–4	T–4th
1956	Edward L. Mitchell	4–4	2–4	5th
1957	Edward L. Mitchell	6–2–1	4–1	2nd
1958	Edward L. Mitchell	6–2	3–1	2nd
1959	Ted Browne	5–3–1	3–1–1	3rd
1960	Charles R. Cox	7–2–2	5–0–1	T–1st
1961	Charles R. Cox	5–4	1–0	NA
Central Intercollegiate Athletic Association (1962–present)
1962	Charles R. Cox	2–8	---	---
1963	Charles R. Cox	0–8–1	---	---
1964	Elijah Johnson	2–8	---	---
1965	John D. Marshall	3–5	3–5	13th
1966	John D. Marshall	6–3–1	5–1–1	3rd
1967	John D. Marshall	3–6	2–4	13th
1968	John D. Marshall	4–4	4–3	8th
1969	John D. Marshall	5–3	4–3	8th
1970	John D. Marshall	2–7	1–4	6th (Southern)
1971	John D. Marshall	4–6	3–3	T–3rd (Southern)
1972	John D. Marshall	2–8	0–4	5th (Southern)
1973	Baxter Holman	7–2–1	---	---
1974	Baxter Holman	9–2	---	---
1975	Baxter Holman	7–3–1	---	---
1976	Baxter Holman	6–5	---	---
1977	Baxter Holman	4–7	---	---
1978	Andrew Littlejohn	5–4–1	---	---
1979	Andrew Littlejohn	3–8	---	---
1980	Andrew Littlejohn	0–10	---	---
1981	Mel Rose	3–7	---	---
1982	Mel Rose	5–5	---	---
1983	Mel Rose	5–4	---	---
1984	Mel Rose	3–7	2–5	5th (Southern)
1985	David Corley	7–3	5–2	2nd (Southern)
1986	David Corley	3–5–2	2–4–1	4th (Southern)
1987	William M. Spencer	2–8	2–5	6th (Southern)
1988	Fletcher Jones	3–6	1–5	5th (Southern)
1989	Fletcher Jones	1–8	1–5	4th (Southern)
1990	Delano Tucker	3–6	2–4	3rd (Southern)
1991	Delano Tucker	5–5	3–3	5th
1992	Delano Tucker	3–7	2–4	8th
1993	Delano Tucker	1–10	1–7	11th
1994	Rudy Abrams	5–5	5–3	T–3rd
1995	Rudy Abrams	5–4–1	4–3–1	4th
1996	Rudy Abrams	8–2	7–1	2nd
1997	Rudy Abrams	8–3	5–2	T–1st
1998	Rudy Abrams	7–4	5–2	T–1st
1999	Gregory Richardson	4–7	2–5	6th
2000	Gregory Richardson	2–8	1–5	5th (Western)
2001	Gregory Richardson	1–8	0–6	5th (Western)
2002	George Johnson	3–7	2–5	4th (Western)
2003	George Johnson	3–7	3–4	3rd (Western)
2004	George Johnson	2–8	2–5	4th (Western)
2005	Lamonte J. Massie	1–9	1–6	4th (Western)
2006	Lamonte J. Massie	1–9	1–6	5th (Western)
2007	Lamonte J. Massie	0–10	0–7	5th (Western)
2008	Lamonte J. Massie	2–8	2–5	5th (Western)
2009	Lamonte J. Massie; Eric Brown (Interim)	0–10	0–7	6th (Western)
2010	Elvin James	0–11	0–7	6th (Southern)
2011	Elvin James	1–9	0–7	6th (Southern)
2012	Elvin James	2–8	2–5	5th (Southern)
2013	Daryl Williams	3–7	1–6	6th (Southern)
2014	Daryl Williams	5–5	2–5	4th (Southern)
2015	Daryl Williams	5–3	4–3	2nd (Southern)
2016	Daryl Williams	2–8	1–6	6th (Southern)
2017	Daryl Williams	0–10	0–7	6th (Southern)
2018	Daryl Williams	3–6	1–5	6th (Southern)
2019	Daryl Williams	4–6	1–6	6th (Southern)
2020	No team			
2021	Sean Gilbert	1–8	1–5	5th (Southern)
2022	Sean Gilbert	4–6	3–5	4th (Southern)
2023	Sean Gilbert	4–6	4–4	3rd (Southern)
2024	Sean Gilbert	6–4	4–3	5th

== Rivalries ==
- Johnson C. Smith
- Elizabeth City State

== Head coaches ==
No.	Years	Name
1	1892	William J. Trent
2	1901	Unknown
3	1903	Unknown
4	1906–1909; 1912–1916; 1920–1926	Benjamin Butler Church
5	1927–1929	James Meeks
6	1930	Arthur J. Willis
7	1931	Bertrand C. Jacobs
8	1932	William Reid
9	1933	Unknown
10	1934	Harry Parker
11	1935	Robert Gill
12	1936–1940	Samuel E. Barnes
13	1941	Benjamin Hargrave
	1943–1944	Unknown
	1946–1947	William Goodrum
	1948	Maurice Sneed
	1949 –1958	Edward L. Mitchell
	1959	Ted Browne
	1960–1963	Charles R. Cox
	1964	Elijah Johnson
	1965–1972	John D. Marshall
	1973–1977	Baxter D. Holman Jr.
	1978–1980	Andrew Littlejohn
	1981–1984	Mel Rose
	1985–1986	David Corley
	1987–1989	Bill Spencer
	1990–1993	Delano Tucker
	1994–1998	Rudy Abrams
	1999–2001	Gregory Richardson
	2002–2004	George Johnson Jr.
	2005	Ben Coates
#	2005–2006	Robert Massey
	2007–2009	Lamonte J. Massie
#	2009	Eric Brown
	2010–2012	Elvin J. James
	2013–2019	Daryl Williams
	2020–present	Sean Gilbert

# Interim head coach

== Individual accomplishments ==
=== All-Americans ===
Year	Player	Organization
2022	Kevin Larkins Jr.	BTR

BTR = BOXTOROW

=== Award winners ===
- CIAA Offensive Player of the Year
  Joseph White – 1982
  Joseph White – 1983
  Joseph White – 1984
  Rob Clodfelter – 1992
  Wilmont Perry – 1996
  Wilmont Perry – 1997
  Jalen Hendricks – 2014
  Drew Powell – 2015
- CIAA Rookie of the Year
  Chris Williams – 1997
  Jason Ocean – 2000
- CIAA Defensive Player of the Year
  Ronnie Washburn – 1998
  Jason Ocean – 2003
- CIAA Defensive Rookie of the Year
  Robert Massey-Brice – 2008
  Kevin Larkins Jr. – 2022
- CIAA Offensive Rookie of the Year
  Drew Powell – 2012

=== Black College Football Hall of Fame members ===
Name	Position	Years	Inducted	Ref.
Ben Coates	TE	1987–1990	2022	

=== CIAA Hall of Fame members ===
Name	Position	Years	Inducted	Ref.
George Johnson	HC	-	1985	
Alfred Tyler	QB	-	1989	
Ben Coates	TE	1987–1990	2018	
Johnny Stoutamire Jr.	DB	1974–1978	2021	

=== Livingstone Athletics Hall of Fame members ===
Name	Position	Years	Inducted	Ref.
1892 Livingstone football team			1992	
Rudy Abrams	HC	1960–1963, 1994–1998	2005	
Tony Veal	-	-	2006	
Charles Cooley	G, C, K	1995–1998	2019	
Michael Posey	DB	1997–2001	2019	

== Notable former players ==
Player	Pos.	Years
Rudy Abrams		1960–1963
Sherman Simmons	LB	1972–1973
Ben Coates	TE	1987–1990
John Terry	OL	1990–1991
Wilmont Perry	RB	1994–1998
Drew Powell	QB	2012–2015

- Rudy Abrams, head coach, 1960–1963, 1994–1998
  - Abrams was a four-year letterman for Livingstone before becoming the assistant coach at York Road Junior High School in 1964. He didn't coach again until 1969, where he became the running backs and wide receivers coach at Myers Park High School in Charlotte, North Carolina. In 1972, he was named the head coach of West Charlotte High School and held that position for eight seasons, compiling a record of 49–33–1 with two Southwestern 4-A Conference titles in 1976 and 1978 and a state runner-up finish in the latter year. In 1980, he led Garinger High School to a 2–8 record before resigning. He held the position assistant at Johnson C. Smith from 1981 to 1982 before returning to the high school ranks in 1983 as the head coach of East Mecklenburg High School. In 1994, after ten seasons with East Mecklenburg, Abrams joined his alma mater as their head football coach. In 1997, he led Livingstone to their first CIAA championship in program history with an 8–3 (5–2) record. In 1998, he again led the Bears to a CIAA championship, this time being co-champions, with a 7–4 (5–2) record. Both seasons would be capped off with a loss in the Pioneer Bowl. He was named CIAA Coach of the Year from 1996 to 1998. Abrams would finish his coaching career with the North Carolina Central Eagles from 1999 to 2002. He compiled a 51–39–1 record in the college ranks and a 124–81–1 record in the high school ranks.
- Ben Coates, tight end, 1987–1990
  - Coates finished his four-year college career with 103 receptions for 1,268 receiving yards and 18 touchdowns. He won Livingstone's MVP award from 1988 to 1990 while earning a first-team All-CIAA nod in his final college season. He also earned a Black College Sports All-American nod in that season. Coates was drafted in the fifth round (124th overall) of the 1991 NFL draft by the New England Patriots. Coates would play for the Patriots from 1991 to 1999 before signing with the Baltimore Ravens in 2000 and winning Super Bowl XXXV in the process before retiring following the season. Coates was a five-time Pro Bowler (1994–1998), three-time All-Pro (1994, 1995, 1998), and a Super Bowl champion. He was subsequently selected to the CIAA Hall of Fame, National Football League 1990s All-Decade Team, New England Patriots All-1990s Team, New England Patriots 50th Anniversary Team, and the New England Patriots Hall of Fame.
