= Meridian High School (Texas) =

Location
- 500 East County Road 2513; Meridian, Bosque County, Texas 76665-0349; United States; 31.941711°N 97.662001°W

Information
- School type: Public, high school
- Locale: Rural: Remote
- School district: Meridian ISD
- NCES School ID: 483030003394
- Principal: Dana Davis
- Teaching staff: 23.71 (on an FTE basis)
- Grades: 6‍–‍12
- Enrollment: 182 (2023‍–‍2024)
- Student to teacher ratio: 7.68
- Colors: Black and gold
- Athletics conference: UIL Class 2A
- Mascot: Yellow Jackets/Lady Jackets
- Yearbook: Yellow Jacket
- Website: Meridian High School

Meridian High School is a public high school located on the north edge of Meridian, Texas and classified as a 2A school by the University Interscholastic League. It is part of the Meridian Independent School District located in central Bosque County. During 2022‍–‍2023, Meridian High School had an enrollment of 187 students and a student to teacher ratio of 7.26. The school received an overall rating of "D" from the Texas Education Agency for the 2024‍–‍2025 school year

== Athletics ==
The Meridian Yellow Jackets compete in these sports -

- Baseball
- Basketball
- Cross Country
- Football
- Golf
- Powerlifting
- Softball
- Tennis
- Track and Field

=== State Titles ===
- Boys Golf -
  - 1997(1A)
- Boys Track -
  - 1977(B)
- Girls Track -
  - 1977(B)

==== State Finalists ====
- Volleyball -
  - 1968(1A)

== Notable alumni ==
- Addison Orsborn (2022), flag football player
