= Dora Dougherty Strother =

American aviator

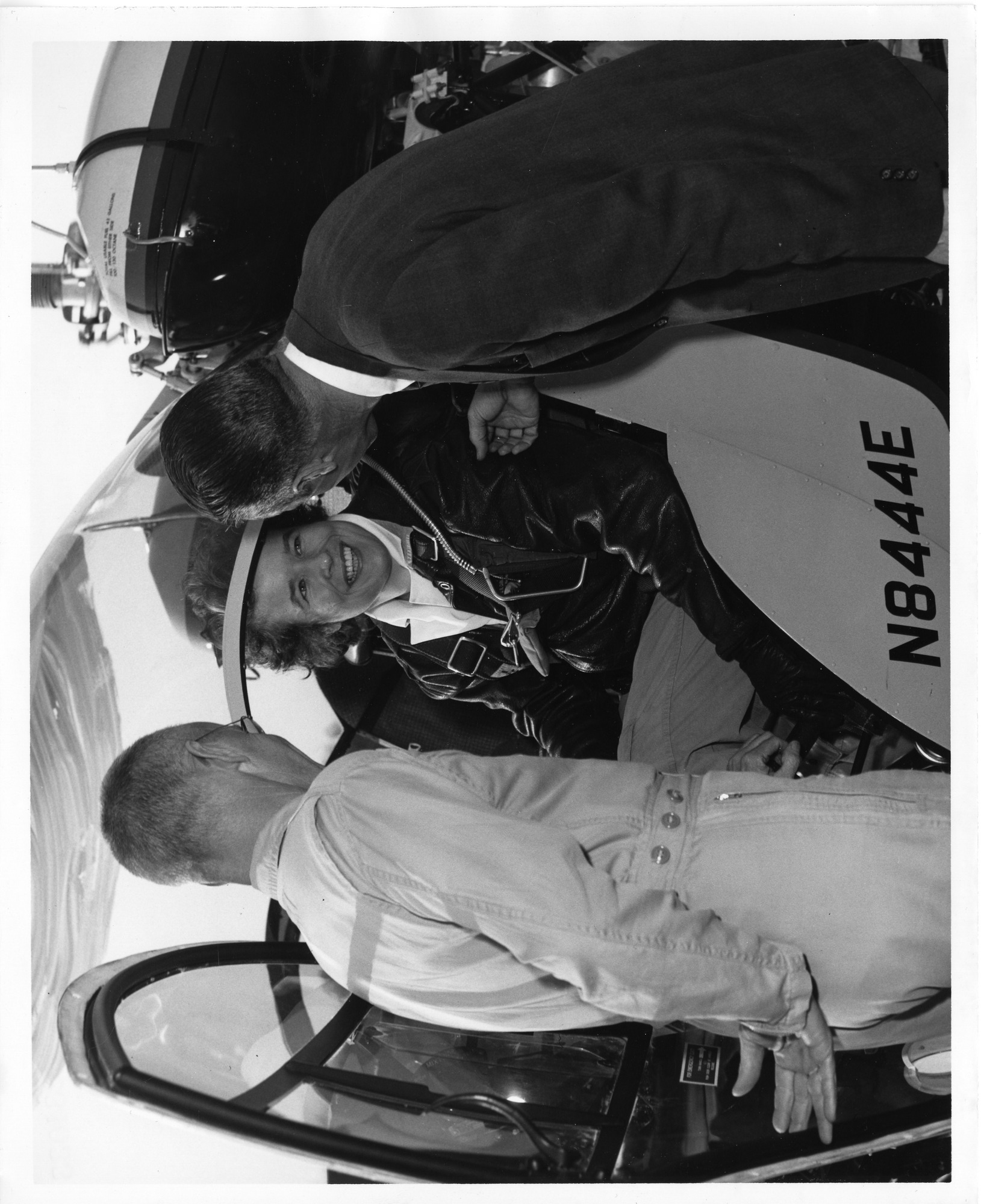
- Jean Dougherty Strother, with E.J. Ducayet (right) and R.C. Buyers (left)
- Born: Dora Jean Dougherty Strother McKeown; November 27, 1921; St. Paul, Minnesota, U.S.
- Died: November 19, 2013 (aged 91)
- Resting place: Arlington National Cemetery
- Education: Cottey College (1941); New York University (PhD, Aviation Education; 1955)
- Awards: Amelia Earhart Award; Military Aviation Hall of Fame; Texas Women's Hall of Fame
- Aviation career
- Air force: U.S. Army Air Forces
- Rank: Lieutenant Colonel

Dora Jean Dougherty Strother (also known as Dora Dougherty McKeown or Dora Strother McKeown; November 27, 1921 – November 19, 2013) was an American aviator best known as a Woman Airforce Service Pilots (WASP) and B-29 Superfortress demonstration pilot. She was a U.S. military pilot, human factors engineer with Bell Aircraft, instructor at the University of Illinois and helicopter test pilot for Bell Aircraft.

Strother held a PhD in Aviation Education (NYU, 1955). She was a recipient of the Amelia Earhart Award for academic achievement and was an inductee in the Military Aviation Hall of Fame. In 1966, she was awarded the Achievement Award by the American Association of University Women. Strother was a 1987 inductee to the Texas Women's Hall of Fame. Strother was also a Whirly-Girl, serving as President of the organization from 1979 to 1981, and a member of the Ninety-Nines.

== Career as a WASP ==
In 1940, Strother earned her pilot certificate via the Civilian Pilot Training Program, sponsored by the Civil Aeronautics Authority. She then became the sixth woman in the United States to earn an airline transport pilot license. The demand for male pilots in World War II opened doors for pilot training programs for women. Initially, two separate training programs were run: the Women's Auxiliary Ferrying Squadron (WAFS) was headed by Nancy Harkness Love and the 319th Women's Flying Training Detachment (WFTD) organized by Jacqueline Cochran out of Houston. The programs were merged in 1943 as Women's Airforce Service Pilots (WASP) and helmed by Cochran. Dora Jean Dougherty Strother volunteered and was selected in the third class of WASP program (43-3).

Strother's piloting jobs in the WASP program included flight training, target towing for antiaircraft gunnery, ferrying, and radio control piloting. WASPs like Strother flew almost every type of plane used by Army Air Forces such as liaison, training, and cargo aircraft. They also flew and trained other pilots to fly fighters, dive bombers, attack bombers, and very heavy bombers like the B-29. In 1944, she and fellow WASP Dorothea Johnson Moorman were selected by Lt. Col. Paul W. Tibbets to learn to fly the Boeing B-29 Superfortress heavy bomber. The plane was considered dangerous and cumbersome, and Tibbets believed the two women could learn to fly the four-engine plane to showcase its reliability. After four days of flight training, Tibbets certified Strother and Moorman for the B-29, some of the few women to fly the type for decades. They flew the B-29 from Birmingham, Alabama, to Clovis, New Mexico. There they took male crews on flights and further trained them, demonstrating the feasibility of flying the B-29 for a few days, and the crews' attitude towards the B-29 improved. Then Air Staff Major General Barney Giles stopped the program.

Strother was honorably discharged from the U.S. Army Air Forces on December 20, 1944, having commanded 23 different aircraft.

== Teaching, engineering, and helicopters ==
After the WASP service was disbanded, Strother began work at the University of Illinois and taught flight courses; these included primary, advanced, and instrument flight courses. Before that, from 1944 to 1949, she worked in airfields across the United States, teaching pilots and ferrying aircraft. At the start of the 1950s, Strother studied Aviation Education, earning her doctorate from New York University in 1955. She resumed her teaching at the University of Illinois in the role of Chief Research Pilot through 1957.

Starting in 1958, Strother worked for Bell Aircraft as a human factors engineer, where she designed helicopter cockpits. Though a highly skilled fixed-wing pilot, Strother developed expertise in helicopter flight and became a test pilot for Bell Helicopter company. In thirty-four hours of helicopter flight time, she set two world records for altitude (19,406 feet) and distance (straight line 404.36 miles). The record for altitude was set in a Bell 47G-3 helicopter. Strother held these rotorcraft records from 1961 to 1966.

== Legacy ==
Following her retirement from Bell Helicopter as Chief of Human Factors Engineering and Cockpit Arrangement, she began serving as a member of the U.S. Army Science Board.

Strother helped build the reputation of the human factor engineering design group at Bell Helicopter/Textron over 28 years at the company. She was recognized for her work by three technical professional societies, where Strother was elected as a fellow in the American Psychological Association, the American Helicopter Society, and the Human Factors Society of America.

Strother's (43-W-3) testimony helped to legally validate WASP service as active duty military service, allowing women pilots from World War II to gain veteran's status and benefits.

On Thanksgiving Day, November 23, 1977, President Jimmy Carter signed WASP militarization into law with PL 95-202, which was applied to all WASP participants.

== External links and primary sources ==
- Fly Girls. PBS Resource Center. Transcripts and Primary Source documents.
- Ahmann, Neil. Dora Jean Dougherty Strother (1991). United States Air Force Oral History Program: Interview of Dr. Dora Dougherty Strother. Ed. Faye Davis. Maxwell Air Force Base, Alabama: Air Force Historical Research Agency.
