= 1929 Wiley Wildcats football team =

American college football season

1929 Wiley Wildcats football

SWAC champion
- Conference: Southwestern Athletic Conference
- Record: 6–1–1 (3–0–1 SWAC)
- Head coach: Fred T. Long (7th season)
- Home stadium: Wiley Field

1929 Southwestern Athletic Conference football standings
	Conf.					Overall
Team	W		L		T	W		L		T
Wiley $	3	–	0	–	1	6	–	1	–	1
Bishop	2	–	1	–	1	4	–	3	–	1
Prairie View	1	–	1	–	2	6	–	2	–	2
Samuel Huston	0	–	2	–	2	?	–	?	–	?
Texas College	0	–	2	–	2	?	–	?	–	?
$ – Conference champion

The 1929 Wiley Wildcats football team represented Wiley College as a member of the Southwestern Athletic Conference (SWAC) during the 1929 college football season. Led by seventh-year head coach Fred T. Long, the Wildcats compiled an overall record of 6–1–1, with a conference record of 3–0–1, and finished as SWAC champion.

== Schedule ==
Date	Opponent	Site	Result	Source
September 27	Jarvis*	Fair Park; Marshall, TX	W 46–0	
October 12	Straight*	Wiley Field; Marshall, TX	W 81–0	
October 21	vs. Prairie View	Fair Park; Dallas, TX	T 0–0	
October 27	Texas College	Wiley Field; Marshall, TX	W 21–0	
November 1	at Samuel Huston	Samuel Huston Field; Austin, TX	W 3–2	
November 11	at Southern*	University Field; Baton Rouge, LA	L 4–7	
November 16	at Philander Smith*	Little Rock, AR	W 39–7	
November 28	Bishop	Wiley Field; Marshall, TX	W 10–8	
*Non-conference game
