= Rudy Abrams =

American football player and coach (born 1942)

Biographical details
- Born: January 14, 1942 (age 83)

Playing career
- 1960–1963: Livingstone

Coaching career (HC unless noted)
- 1964: York Road JHS (NC) (assistant)
- 1969–1971: Myers Park HS (NC) (RB/WR)
- 1972–1979: West Charlotte HS (NC)
- 1980: Garinger HS (NC)
- 1981–1982: Johnson C. Smith (assistant)
- 1983–1993: East Mecklenburg HS (NC)
- 1994–1998: Livingstone
- 1999–2002: North Carolina Central

Head coaching record
- Overall: 51–39–1 (college)
- Bowls: 0–2

Accomplishments and honors

Championships
- 2 CIAA (1997–1998)

Awards
- 3× CIAA Coach of the Year (1996–1998)

Thomas "Rudy" Abrams (born January 14, 1942) is an American former football coach. He served as the head football coach at Livingstone College in Salisbury, North Carolina from 1994 to 1998 and North Carolina Central University in Durham, North Carolina from 1999 to 2002.

Abrams lettered in football for four years at Livingstone before graduating in 1964 with a Bachelor of Science degree in business education. He began his coaching career in 1964 as an assistant at York Road Junior High school in Charlotte, North Carolina. From 1969 to 1971, he was an assistant at Myers Park High School, also in Charlotte, mentoring the running backs and wide receivers under head coach Gus Purcell. In 1972, Abrams was appointed as the head football coach at West Charlotte High School. He led West Charlotte to a record of 49–33–1 in eight seasons, highlighted by Southwestern 4-A Conference titles in 1976 and 1978, and a second-place finish in the state in 1978. He left West Charlotte in 1980 to become head coach at cross-town rival Garinger High School, leading Garginer to a record of 2–8 in one season before resigning.

After two years as an assistant coach at Johnson C. Smith University, Abrams was named head football coach at East Mecklenburg High School, also in Charlotte, in 1983.

== Head coaching record ==
=== College ===
Year	Team	Overall	Conference	Standing	Bowl/playoffs
Livingstone Blue Bears (Central Intercollegiate Athletic Association) (1994–1998)
1994	Livingstone	5–5	5–3	T–3rd	
1995	Livingstone	5–4–1	4–3–1	4th	
1996	Livingstone	8–2	7–1	2nd	
1997	Livingstone	8–3	5–2	1st	L Pioneer
1998	Livingstone	7–4	5–2	T–1st	L Pioneer
Livingstone:		33–18–1	26–11–1		
North Carolina Central Eagles (Central Intercollegiate Athletic Association) (1999–2002)
1999	North Carolina Central	5–5	4–3	T–4th	
2000	North Carolina Central	4–6	3–3	2nd (Western)	
2001	North Carolina Central	5–4	3–3	3rd (Western)	
2002	North Carolina Central	4–6	2–5	T–3rd (Western)	
Virginia Union:		18–21	12–14		
Total:		51–39–1			
National championship Conference title Conference division title or championship game berth
