= 2023 NAIA flag football season =

- Total No. of teams: 13
- Regular season: February 15 – April 29, 2023
- National championship: Mercedes-Benz Stadium; Atlanta, GA; May 18–20, 2023
- Champion(s): Ottawa (KS)

The 2023 NAIA flag football season was the component of the 2023 college football season organized by the National Association of Intercollegiate Athletics (NAIA) in the United States. It was the third season of the NAIA sponsoring flag football as a varsity women's sport, in contrast with traditional, full-contact college football which is played almost exclusively by men. With 13 schools playing in this season, it remained classified an "emerging" sport by the NAIA. A postseason tournament was held at Mercedes-Benz Stadium with the Ottawa Braves retaining their champions title, their third in the only three years of NAIA flag football.

== Standings ==
Rank	School	Record
1	Ottawa (KS)	17–1
2	Thomas	18–2
3	St. Thomas (FL)	19–5
4	Kansas Wesleyan	14–5
5	Midland	15–7
6	Webber International	10–8
7	Keiser	9–6
8	Warner	9–11
9	Cottey	6–14
10	Reinhardt	3–12
11	Florida Memorial	2–12
12	St. Mary (KS)	1–10
13	Bethel (KS)	1–9
