= 2021 NAIA flag football season =

- Total No. of teams: 15
- Regular season: February 20 – April 17, 2021
- National championship: Mercedes-Benz Stadium; Atlanta, GA; May 5–8, 2021
- Champion: Ottawa (KS)

The 2021 NAIA flag football season was the component of the 2021 college football season organized by the National Association of Intercollegiate Athletics (NAIA) in the United States. It was the first season of the NAIA sponsoring flag football as a varsity women's sport, in contrast with traditional, full-contact college football which is played almost exclusively by men. With 15 initial schools announced, it was classified an "emerging" sport by the NAIA. A 10-team postseason tournament was held at Mercedes-Benz Stadium with the Ottawa Braves claiming their first title.

== Standings ==
Rank	School	Record
1	Ottawa (KS)	14–1
2	Keiser	13–1
3	Kansas Wesleyan	15–6
4	St. Thomas (FL)	14–6
5	Webber International	10–4
6	Midland	7–12
7	St. Mary (KS)	6–5
8	Warner	2–9
9	Milligan	1–7
10	Cottey	0–4
11	Florida Memorial	0–2
12	Xavier (LA)	???
13	Tougaloo	???
14	Reinhardt	0–0
15	La Sierra	???
