= 2022 NAIA flag football season =

- Total No. of teams: 13
- Regular season: February 12 – April 23, 2022
- National championship: Mercedes-Benz Stadium; Atlanta, GA; May 12–14, 2022
- Champion(s): Ottawa (KS)

The 2022 NAIA flag football season was the component of the 2022 college football season organized by the National Association of Intercollegiate Athletics (NAIA) in the United States. It was the second season of the NAIA sponsoring flag football as a varsity women's sport, in contrast with traditional, full-contact college football which is played almost exclusively by men. Contracting from 15 to 13 schools playing in this season, it remained classified an "emerging" sport by the NAIA. A postseason tournament was held at Mercedes-Benz Stadium with the Ottawa Braves claiming their second title.

== Standings ==
Rank	School	Record
1	Ottawa (KS)	16-2
2	Keiser	13-4
3	Thomas	11-2
4	Kansas Wesleyan	10-5
5	St. Mary (KS)	7-9
6	St. Thomas (FL)	6-4
7	Webber International	5-5
8	Midland	4-11
9	Florida Memorial	2-7
10	Warner	2-9
11	Milligan	1-8
12	Cottey	1-13
13	Xavier (LA)	0-1
