= Warner University =

Christian university in Lake Wales, Florida, US

Coordinates: 27.8263°N 81.6022°W

- Former name: Warner Southern College (1968–2008)
- Type: Private
- Established: 1968; 58 years ago
- Religious affiliation: Church of God
- Endowment: $3.2 million
- President: Gentry Sutton
- Students: 1,200
- Location: Lake Wales, Florida, United States
- Campus: Rural
- Colors: Navy & Gold
- Nickname: Royals
- Sporting affiliations: NAIA – The Sun
- Mascot: Duke
- Website: warner.edu
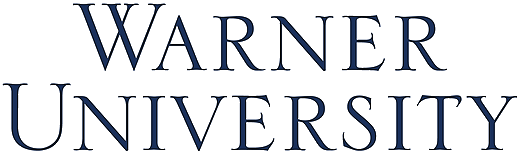

Warner University is a private Christian university in Lake Wales, Florida, United States. It is affiliated with the Church of God.

== History ==
"Warner Southern College" was founded in 1968 by the Southeastern Association of the Church of God in Anderson, Indiana. The first freshman class of 27 students entered in the fall of 1968. In 2008, the name was changed to "Warner University".

== Campus ==
Warner's 360-acre (1,456,868.3 m^{2}) campus is located 5 miles (8 km) south of Lake Wales, Florida, in the geographic center of the state between Tampa and Orlando.

== Student enrollment ==
Enrollment reached 1,215 students in the fall of 2017; the university had a student-to-faculty ratio of 16:1 in that year. 43% of undergraduates at Warner University are first-generation college students. In 2019–2020, gender distribution was 54 percent male students and 46 percent female students.

== Awards and recognition ==
Warner University was ranked #103-135 in Regional Universities South by U.S. News & World Report in 2022-23.

Warner University was ranked #63 the Regional Colleges South category of U.S. News & World Report's "Best Colleges."

Warner University's ranking in the 2020 edition of U.S. News & World Report's "Best Colleges" is #58 in the Regional Colleges South category. Schools are ranked according to their performance across a set of widely accepted indicators of excellence.

== Academics ==
According to US News and World Report, in 2024 only 25% of the students at Warner graduated within four years.

Warner is accredited by the Commission on Colleges of the Southern Association of Colleges and Schools and offers over 30 undergraduate degree programs for traditional students. For working adults, Warner offers a Master of Business Administration, a Master of Arts in education, a Master of Science in management, a Bachelor of Science in Transformational Church Ministry, a Bachelor of Arts in Educational Studies, a Bachelor of Arts in Healthcare Management, and a Bachelor of Arts in Business Administration. These degrees are available in either an online or site-based format. In recent years, Warner added a Bachelor of Arts in Agricultural Studies.

Warner also supports a unique training facility known as the H.E.A.R.T. (Hunger Education and Resources Training) Institute. The HEART Institute is a simulated developing country village which trains students in missionary fieldwork while giving them an opportunity to live in an environment similar to many underdeveloped parts of the world.

== Library ==
The Pontious Learning Resource Center serves as the academic library at Warner University. Its collection includes approximately over 50,000 books and 10,000 periodical subscriptions. The Pioneer Room houses the Church of God and Warner University archival materials.

== Athletics ==
The Warner athletic teams are called the Royals. The university is a member of the National Association of Intercollegiate Athletics (NAIA), primarily competing in the Sun Conference (formerly known as the Florida Sun Conference (FSC) until 2008) for most of its sports since the 1990–91 academic year; while its men's volleyball team competes in the Mid-South Conference (MSC). They are also a member of the National Christian College Athletic Association (NCCAA), primarily competing as an independent in the South Region of the Division I level.

Warner competes in 21 intercollegiate varsity sports: Men's sports include baseball, basketball, cross country, football, soccer, tennis, track & field and volleyball; women's sports include basketball, beach volleyball, cheerleading, cross country, dance, flag football, lacrosse, soccer, softball, tennis, track & field and volleyball; and co-ed sports include clay target. Former sports included men's & women's golf.

=== Volleyball ===
Warner was the first college/university to offer a varsity men's volleyball program in the state of Florida. The men's volleyball program participates in the Mid-South Conference (MSC). The program initially competed in the Mid-America Men's Volleyball Intercollegiate Conference (MAMVIC). The program made back-to-back appearances in the NAIA Men's Volleyball National Invitational Tournament in 2011 and 2012.

== See also ==
- Independent Colleges and Universities of Florida
