= Gregory Richardson (American football) =

American football coach

Biographical details
- Born: July 10, 1951; Charlotte, North Carolina, U.S.
- Died: November 5, 2023 (aged 72); Charlotte, North Carolina, U.S.
- Education: North Carolina Central (1974)

Playing career

Football
- 1969–1971: North Carolina Central

Coaching career (HC unless noted)

Football
- 1981–1982: Johnson C. Smith (DB)
- 1986–1987: Johnson C. Smith (DC)
- 1988–1990: Norfolk State (DC)
- 1991: North Carolina Central (DC)
- 1992–1993: Buffalo (AHC/DC)
- 1994–1996: Livingstone (DC)
- 1997–1998: Virginia Union (DC)
- 1999–2001: Livingstone
- 2002–2004: Winston-Salem State (DC)
- 2005–?: Johnson C. Smith (DC)
- 2008: Virginia Union
- 2015–2017: Winston-Salem State (ILB)

Track and field
- 1986–1987: Johnson C. Smith

Head coaching record
- Overall: 12–28 (football)

Gregory Richardson (July 10, 1951 – November 5, 2023) was an American football coach. He served as the head football coach at Livingstone College in Salisbury, North Carolina from 1999 to 2001 and at Virginia Union University in Richmond, Virginia in 2008.

== Early life and education ==
Richardson graduated from Harry P. Harding High School in Charlotte, North Carolina in 1969 and then attended North Carolina Central University in Durham, North Carolina, where he lettered in football for three seasons, from 1969 to 1971.

== Head coaching record ==
Year	Team	Overall	Conference	Standing	Bowl/playoffs
Livingstone Blue Bears (Central Intercollegiate Athletic Association) (1999–2001)
1999	Livingstone	4–7	2–5	6th	
2000	Livingstone	2–8	1–5	5th (Western)	
2001	Livingstone	1–8	0–6	5th (Western)	
Livingstone:		7–23	3–16		
Virginia Union Panthers (Central Intercollegiate Athletic Association) (2008)
2008	Virginia Union	5–5	3–4	T–4th (Eastern)	
Virginia Union:		5–5	3–4		
Total:		12–28			
