= Meridian, Texas =

City in and county seat of Bosque County, Texas, United States

- City
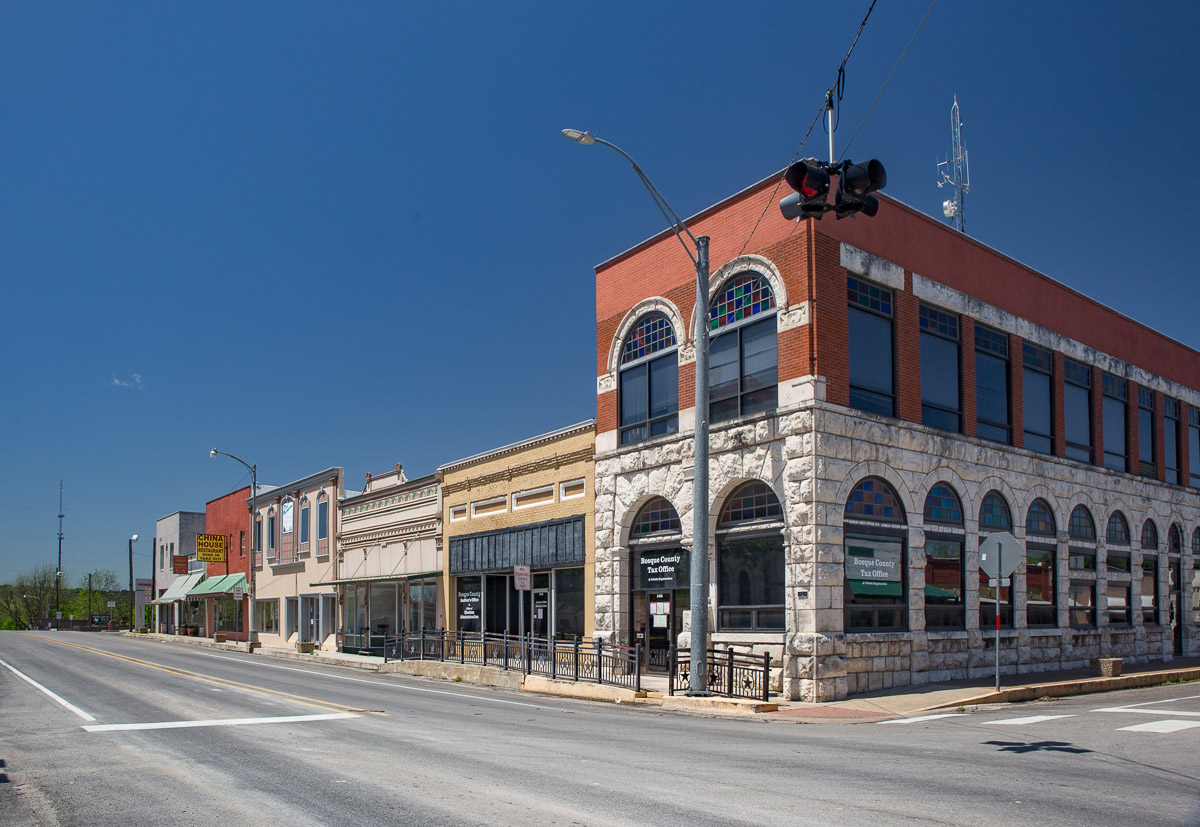
- Downtown Meridian, Texas

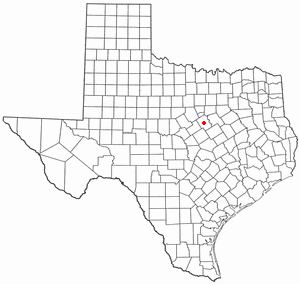
- Location of Meridian, Texas

- Coordinates: 31°55′34″N 97°39′01″W
- Country: United States
- State: Texas
- County: Bosque

Area
  - Total: 2.10 sq mi (5.45 km^{2})
  - Land: 2.08 sq mi (5.40 km^{2})
  - Water: 0.019 sq mi (0.05 km^{2})
- Elevation: 758 ft (231 m)

Population (2020)
  - Total: 1,396
  - Density: 670/sq mi (259/km^{2})
- Time zone: UTC-6 (Central (CST))
  - Summer (DST): UTC-5 (CDT)
- ZIP code: 76665
- Area code: 254
- FIPS code: 48-47760
- GNIS feature ID: 2411084
- Website: www.meridiantexas.us

Meridian (pronounced muh-REE-dee-uhn by locals) is a city in and the county seat of Bosque County in Texas, United States. It is 47 miles northwest of Waco. Its population was 1,396 at the 2020 census.

== Geography ==
According to the United States Census Bureau, the city has a total area of 2.0 square miles (5.1 km^{2}), of which 0.015 square miles (0.04 km^{2}), or 0.85%, is covered by water.

=== Climate ===
The climate in this area is characterized by hot, humid summers and generally mild to cool winters. According to the Köppen climate classification, Meridian has a humid subtropical climate, Cfa on climate maps.

== Demographics ==
Historical population
Census	Pop.	Note	%±
1900	923		—
1910	718		−22.2%
1920	1,024		42.6%
1930	759		−25.9%
1940	1,016		33.9%
1950	1,146		12.8%
1960	993		−13.4%
1970	1,162		17.0%
1980	1,330		14.5%
1990	1,390		4.5%
2000	1,491		7.3%
2010	1,493		0.1%
2020	1,396		−6.5%
U.S. Decennial Census

=== 2020 census ===
As of the 2020 census, Meridian had a population of 1,396. The median age was 39.5 years; 25.1% of the residents were under 18 and 19.8% were 65 or older. For every 100 females, there were 93.9 males, and for every 100 females 18 and over, there were 89.5 males 18 and over.

None of the residents lived in urban areas, while 100.0% lived in rural areas.

Of the 531 households in Meridian, 33.1% had children under 18 living in them, 41.8% were married-couple households, 19.4% were households with a male householder and no spouse or partner present, and 31.3% were households with a female householder and no spouse or partner present. About 30.3% of all households were made up of individuals, and 15.2% had someone living alone who was 65 or older.

The city had 613 housing units, of which 13.4% were vacant. The homeowner vacancy rate was 1.2% and the rental vacancy rate was 10.8%.

Racial composition as of the 2020 census
Race	Number	Percentage
White	940	67.3%
Black or African American	75	5.4%
American Indian and Alaska Native	8	0.6%
Asian	23	1.6%
Native Hawaiian and other Pacific Islander	0	0.0%
Some other race	188	13.5%
Two or more races	162	11.6%
Hispanics or Latinos (of any race)	390	27.9%

Meridian racial composition (NH = Non-Hispanic) (Note: Note: the US Census treats Hispanic/Latino as an ethnic category. This table excludes Latinos from the racial categories and assigns them to a separate category. Hispanics/Latinos can be of any race.)
Race	Number	Percentage
White (NH)	854	61.17%
Black or African American (NH)	65	4.66%
Native American or Alaska Native (NH)	8	0.57%
Asian (NH)	23	1.65%
Multiracial (NH)	56	4.01%
Hispanics or Latinos	390	27.94%
Total	1,396	

=== 2000 census ===
As of the 2000 census, 1,491 people, 515 households, and 358 families were living in the city. The population density was 689.3 inhabitants per square mile (266.1/km^{2}). The 600 housing units had an average density of 277.4 per square mile (107.1/km^{2}). The racial makeup of the city was 83.43% White, 5.37% African American, 0.27% Native American, 0.07% Asian, 8.18% from other races, and 2.68% from two or more races. Hispanics or Latinos of any race were 23.00% of the population.

Of yhe 515 households, 36.9% had children under 18 living with them, 52.0% were married couples living together, 13.2% had a female householder with no husband present, and 30.3% were not families. About 28.3% of all households were made up of individuals, and 16.9% had someone living alone who was 65 or older. The average household size was 2.66, and the average family size was 3.27.

In the city, the age distribution was 28.7% under 18, 7.7% from 18 to 24, 26.3% from 25 to 44, 17.4% from 45 to 64, and 19.9% who were 65 or older. The median age was 36 years. For every 100 females, there were 87.5 males. For every 100 females 18 and over, there were 83.9 males.

The median income in the city for a household was $32,750 and for a family was $40,625. Males had a median income of $30,179 versus $20,227 for females. The per capita income for the city was $17,258. About 10.8% of families and 14.4% of the population were below the poverty line, including 13.5% of those under 18 and 27.4% of those 65 or over.

== Education ==
Meridian is served by the Meridian Independent School District and is home to Meridian High School.

== Notable people ==
- Torrence Allen, NFL player for the San Diego Chargers from 2014 to 2016
- Earle Bradford Mayfield, U.S. senator from Texas from 1923 to 1929, practiced law in Meridian early in his career
- Frank Pollard, NFL running back for nine seasons with the Pittsburgh Steelers in the 1980s
- Dan Campbell, former NFL tight end for 11 seasons, head coach of the Detroit Lions

== Photo gallery ==
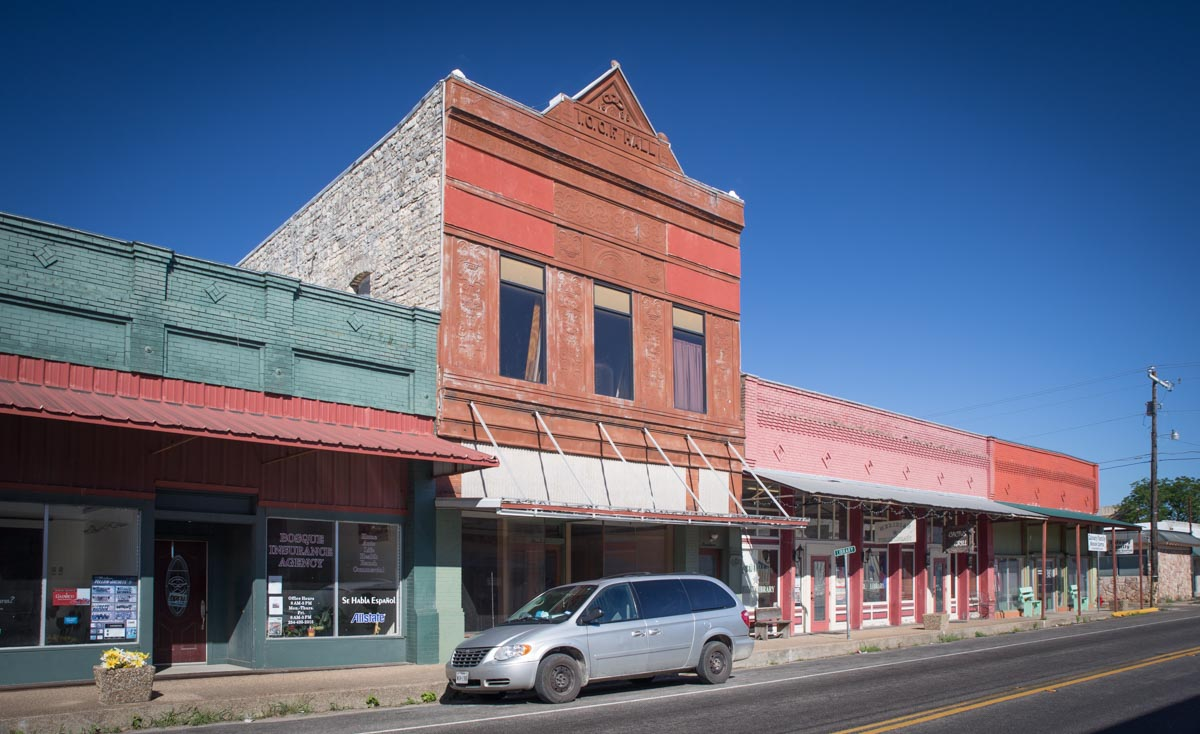
Downtown Meridian

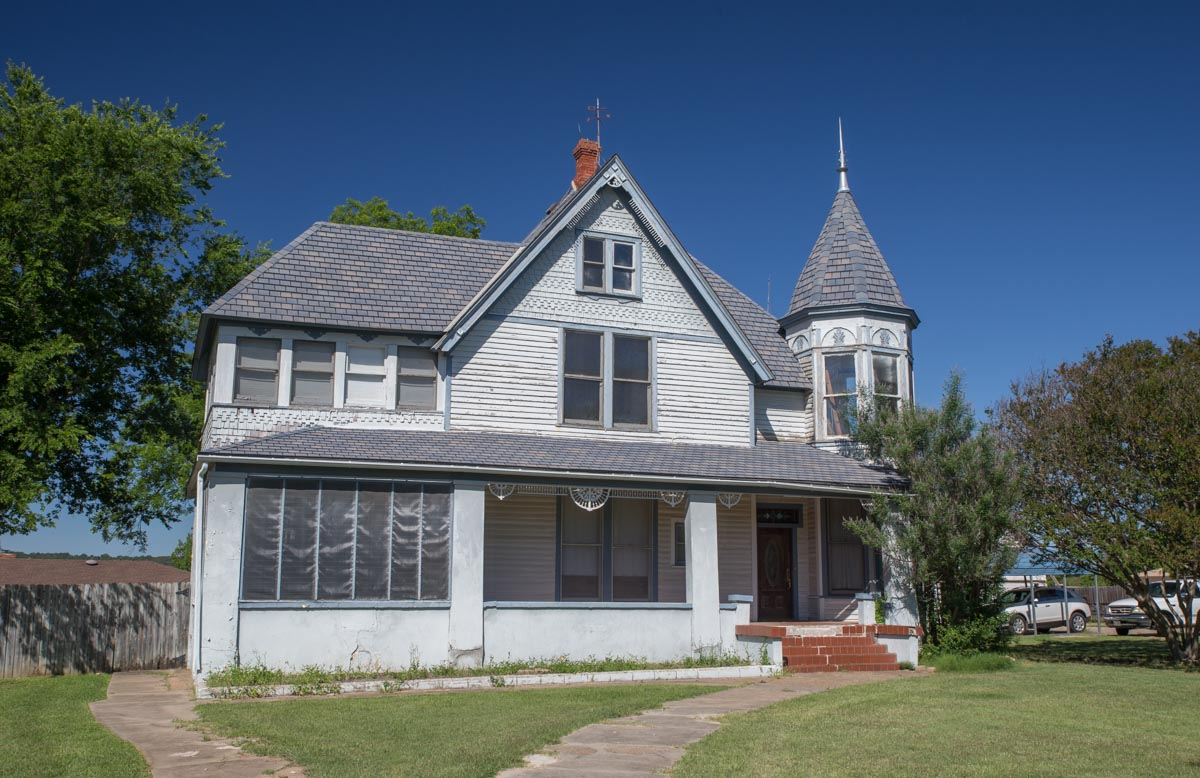
Lumpkin-Woodruff House

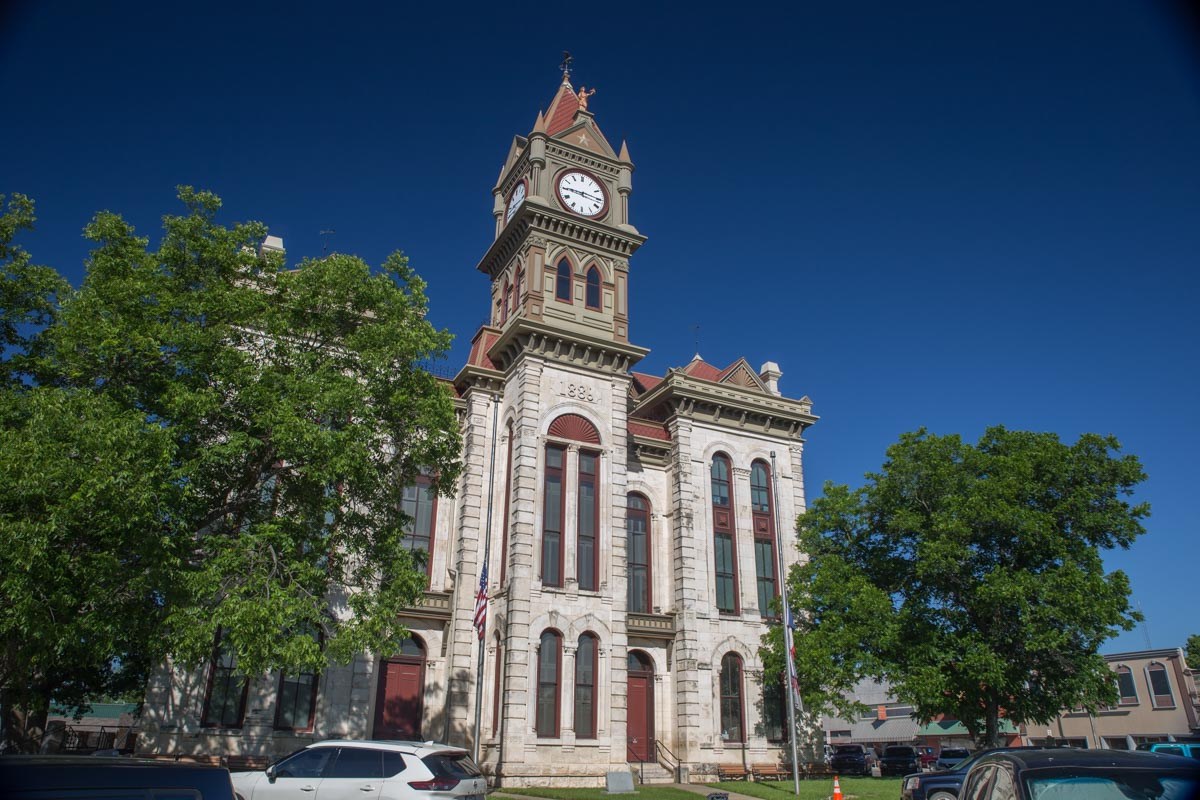
Bosque County Courthouse

== See also ==
- List of municipalities in Texas
