= Judith McCulloh =

American folklorist and editor (1935–2014)

- Born: Judith Marie Binkele; August 16, 1935; Spring Valley, Illinois, U.S.
- Died: July 13, 2014 (aged 78); Urbana, Illinois, U.S.
- Education: Cottey College, general diploma; Ohio Wesleyan University, B.A. in English; Ohio State University, M.A. in English; Indiana University Bloomington, Ph.D. in Folklore (1970)
- Occupations: Folklorist; ethnomusicologist; editor
- Years active: 1972–2011
- Employer: University of Illinois Press
- Awards: National Heritage Fellowship (2010)

Judith McCulloh (August 16, 1935 – July 13, 2014) was an American folklorist, ethnomusicologist, and university press editor.

== Early life and education ==
McCulloh was born in Spring Valley, Illinois, on August 16, 1935 to Henry and Edna Binkele. All four of her grandparents were from Germany. She was the 100th baby to have been born at the Spring Valley Hospital. Her father worked for the railroad in Spring Valley, and the family later moved to Peoria, Illinois where her father got a job working for Caterpillar Tractor. She grew up at Northmoor Orchard, not far from Peoria, where her parents had bought an apple orchard and sold apples and cider. She graduated from Peoria Central High School.

She first became interested in folk music in 1954 while attending the National Folk Festival in St. Louis. She studied at Cottey College, Ohio Wesleyan University, and Ohio State University. The summer before she was to travel to Europe on a Fulbright Fellowship, she attended a Folklore Institute at Indiana University for several weeks. That event was "the most exhilarating experience" she had ever had, and influenced her decision to not continue her studies at Ohio State University but instead to enroll in Indiana's folklore program. In 1970, she earned her Ph.D. in folklore from Indiana University Bloomington, with minors in anthropology and linguistics. The title of her dissertation was 'In the Pines': The Melodic-Textual Identity of an American Lyric Folksong Cluster, which was a text tune study of the lyric folk song "In the Pines" and the 160 variants and arrangements of the song created up to that time. While at Indiana University, she worked as an assistant in the Archives of Traditional Music and was an assistant to the editor of the journal Folklore and Folk Music Archivist.

== Career ==
She moved to Urbana, Illinois in the 1960s when her husband accepted a job at the University of Illinois Urbana-Champaign. In the early 1960s, she edited two recordings for the University of Illinois Campus Folksong Club: a collection of cowboy and rodeo songs titled The Hell-Bound Train performed by Glenn Ohrlin and a collection of field recordings from central and southern Illinois titled Green Fields of Illinois.

In 1972, she began working as an assistant editor at the University of Illinois Press, where she continued to work for 35 years until her retirement in 2007. Her positions at the Press also included executive editor, assistant director, and director of development.

In her first year at the Press, she launched and was the editor of the acclaimed Music in American Life book series. She also created the UI Press series Folklore and Society, and was instrumental in the 1983 launching of the scholarly journal American Music, published by the UI Press in conjunction with the Sonneck Society and edited by Allen Britton.

Music in American Life was the first book series devoted to the study of music in the United States. It "began issuing path-breaking studies shaped by the fields of folklore, English literature, and labor history, before American music had become a subject in the academic curriculum, and it had a profound effect on shaping the emergent field". The first book in the series was Archie Green's Only a Miner: Studies in Recorded Coal-Mining Songs. Under McCulloh's editorship, 130 titles were published in the series and 20 of them earned American Society of Composers, Authors and Publishers Awards.

In the earlier years of her career, in addition to her work as an editor, McCulloh also wrote book chapters and articles for scholarly journals, as well as many book reviews in her areas of expertise.

Over the course of her career, she was a member of many scholarly organizations, including serving on the board of trustees of the American Folklife Center at the Library of Congress from 1986–2004. She served two terms as the AFC chair (1990–92 and 1996–98) and was named trustee emerita in 2004. She served as president of the American Folklore Society (1986–87) and worked for almost 20 years on the American Musicological Society's Music of the United States of America series. For the Society for American Music, she was the first vice-president (1989–93) and served on numerous committees from 1991–2011.

== Personal life ==
She was married for 52 years to Leon McCulloh, a professor of Mathematics at the University of Illinois Urbana-Champaign. When not pursuing academic interests, she was an avid gardener, and enjoyed sewing and quilting.

McCulloh died of cancer in Urbana, Illinois, on July 13, 2014, aged 78. Several memorials in her name were posthumously established, among them the Judith McCulloh Fellowship by the Society for American Music, the Judith McCulloh Fund for American Music at the University of Illinois Press, and the Judith McCulloh Public Sector Award, distributed by the Society for Ethnomusicology.

== Published works ==
=== Books ===
- 1975: Stars of Country Music: Uncle Dave Macon to Johnny Rodriquez, edited by Bill C. Malone and Judith McCulloh
- 1982: Ethnic Recordings in America: A Neglected Heritage, edited by Judith McCulloh
- 1984: Folklore/Folklife, edited by Bruce Jackson, Judith McCulloh, and Marta Weigle

=== Selected journal articles and book chapters ===
- 1965: Traditional Music of America by Ira W. Ford; reprint of the 1940 edition with an introduction by McCulloh
- 1966: "Some Child Ballads on Hillbilly Records" in Folklore & Society: Essays in Honor of Benj. A. Botkin
- 1967: "Hillbilly Records and Tune Transcriptions" in Western Folklore
- 1970: "Indiana's Treasure Store is a Wealth of Good Old Hoosier Lore" in Folklore Forum
- 1975: "Uncle Absie Morrison's Historical Tunes" in Mid-South Folklore
- 1976: "More of Uncle Absie Morrison's Historical Tunes" in Mid-South Folklore
- 1978: "What is 'The Tune' " in Essays in Honor of George List
- 1983: "The Problem of Identity in Lyric Folksong" in The Ballad Image: Essays Presented to Bertrand Harris Bronson
- 1988: "Writing for the World" in Journal of American Folklore

== Awards and honors ==
- 1958–59: Fulbright Fellowship to study Indo-European philology at the Free University of Brussels
- 2001: Society for American Music Distinguished Service citation
- 2002: International Bluegrass Music Association Distinguished Service Award
- 2003: International Country Music Conference Lifetime Achievement Award
- 2005: Society for Ethnomusicology Honorary Member
- 2010: National Endowment for the Arts, National Heritage Fellowship, which is the United States government's highest honor in the folk and traditional arts
- 2011: Association for Recorded Sound Collections Distinguished Service Award
- University of Illinois Chancellor's Academic Professional Excellence Award (year unknown)
- Ohio Wesleyan University Distinguished Achievement Citation (year unknown)
