= 2025 in American football =

This article lists the American football events for 2025.

== Club competitions ==
=== Professional football ===
==== National Football League ====
- February 2: 2025 Pro Bowl Games in Orlando, Florida
  - National Football Conference defeated American Football Conference, 76–63
- February 9: Super Bowl LIX in New Orleans
  - (Pennsylvania) Philadelphia Eagles defeated (Missouri) Kansas City Chiefs, 40–22
- April 24–26: 2025 NFL draft in Green Bay, Wisconsin
  - #1 pick: (Florida) Cam Ward
- September 4, 2025 – January 4, 2026: 2025 NFL season

==== United Football League ====
- March 28 – June 1: 2025 UFL season
- June 14: 2025 UFL championship game in St. Louis
  - (Washington, D.C.) DC Defenders defeated Michigan Panthers, 58–34
- TBD: 2025 UFL draft

==== Indoor American football ====
- Indoor Football League
  - March 21 – August 23: 2025 Indoor Football League season
  - August 23: 2025 IFL National Championship in Tucson, Arizona
    - (Nevada) Vegas Knight Hawks defeated (Wisconsin) Green Bay Blizzard, 64–61
- National Arena League
  - 2025 National Arena League season
  - 2025 NAL Championship Game in Beaumont, Texas
    - (Texas) Beaumont Renegades defeated (Nebraska) Omaha Beef, 37–29
- The Arena League
  - May 30 – August 9: 2025 The Arena League season
  - August 9: ArenaMania II in Duluth, Minnesota
    - (Minnesota) Duluth Harbor Monsters defeated (Arkansas) Hot Springs Wiseguys, 56–27

==== European League of Football ====
- May 17 – September 7: 2025 European League of Football season
- September 7: 2025 ELF Championship in Stuttgart
  - (Germany) Stuttgart Surge defeated (Austria) Vienna Vikings, 24–17

=== College football ===
==== 2024–25 NCAA football bowl games ====
- January 1–2: College Football Playoff Quarterfinals
  - 2025 Rose Bowl in Pasadena, California
    - The Ohio State Buckeyes defeated the Oregon Ducks, 41–21
  - 2025 Peach Bowl in Atlanta
    - The Texas Longhorns defeated the Arizona State Sun Devils, 39–31
  - 2025 Sugar Bowl in New Orleans
    - The Notre Dame Fighting Irish defeated the Georgia Bulldogs, 23–10
- January 9–10: College Football Playoff Semifinals
  - 2025 Orange Bowl in Miami Gardens, Florida
    - The Notre Dame Fighting Irish defeated the Penn State Nittany Lions, 27–24
  - 2025 Cotton Bowl Classic in Arlington, Texas
    - The Ohio State Buckeyes defeated the Texas Longhorns, 28–14
- January 20: 2025 CFP National Championship in Atlanta
  - The Ohio State Buckeyes defeated the Notre Dame Fighting Irish, 34–23

==== 2025–26 NCAA football bowl games ====
- December 31: College Football Playoff Quarterfinals
  - 2025 Cotton Bowl Classic in Arlington, Texas
    - The Miami Hurricanes defeated the Ohio State Buckeyes, 24–14

==== 2025 college football seasons ====
- 2025 NCAA Division I FBS football season
- 2025 NCAA Division I FCS football season
- 2025 NCAA Division II football season
- 2025 NCAA Division III football season
- 2025 NAIA football season
- 2025 NAIA flag football season
- 2025 junior college football season

== International competitions ==
=== National team tournaments ===
- World Games Flag Football (August 14–17): Mexico defeated United States, 26–21
- European Championship of American football (October 12, 2024 – October 26, 2025): Austria defeated Finland, 27–0
