= 2024 NAIA flag football season =

- Total No. of teams: 19
- Regular season: February 14 – April 27, 2024
- National championship: Mercedes-Benz Stadium; Atlanta, GA; May 7–10, 2024
- Champion(s): Ottawa (KS)

The 2024 NAIA flag football season was the component of the 2024 college football season organized by the National Association of Intercollegiate Athletics (NAIA) in the United States. It was the fourth season of the NAIA sponsoring flag football as a varsity women's sport, in contrast with traditional, full-contact college football which is played almost exclusively by men. With 19 schools playing in this season, up from 13 in 2023, it remained classified an "emerging" sport by the NAIA. For the fourth straight season, a postseason tournament was held in Atlanta, with the finals taking place at Mercedes-Benz Stadium. The Ottawa Braves outscored their opponents by a combined total of 114-25 en route to retaining their title for the fourth consecutive season.

== Standings ==
Rank	School	Record
1	Keiser	18–2
2	Ottawa (KS)	17–4
3	Kansas Wesleyan	17–4–1
4	Thomas	16–4
5	Baker	13–7
6	Midland	11–9
7	Warner	6–3
8	Cottey	6–13
9	Webber International	5–4
10	Southwestern (KS)	5–8
11	St. Thomas (FL)	4–5
11	Milligan	4–7–1
12	Reinhardt	3–11
13	St. Mary (KS)	3–12
14	Point	3–13
15	Campbellsville	2–5
16	Life	1–5
17	Florida Memorial	0–5
18	Graceland	0–4
19	Bethel (KS)	0–11
