= 1929 Prairie View Panthers football team =

American college football season

1929 Prairie View Panthers football

Prairie View Bowl, L 0–20 vs. Fisk
- Conference: Southwestern Athletic Conference
- Record: 6–2–2 (1–1–2 SWAC)
- Head coach: Arthur J. Willis (1st season)
- Captain: Prince
- Home stadium: Blackshear Field

1929 Southwestern Athletic Conference football standings
	Conf.					Overall
Team	W		L		T	W		L		T
Wiley $	3	–	0	–	1	6	–	1	–	1
Bishop	2	–	1	–	1	4	–	3	–	1
Prairie View	1	–	1	–	2	6	–	2	–	2
Samuel Huston	0	–	2	–	2	?	–	?	–	?
Texas College	0	–	2	–	2	?	–	?	–	?
$ – Conference champion

The 1929 Prairie View Panthers football team was an American football team that represented Prairie View State Normal & Industrial College (now known as Prairie View A&M University) as a member of the Southwestern Athletic Conference (SWAC) during the 1929 college football season. In their first and only season under head coach Arthur J. Willis, the Panthers compiled an overall record of 6–2–2, with a mark of 1–1–2 in conference play, and finished third in the SWAC.

== Schedule ==
Date	Opponent	Site	Result	Attendance	Source
September 27	Bryan Baptist Academy*	Blackshear Field; Prairie View, TX	W 28–0		
October 5	Beaumont YMCA*	Blackshear Field; Prairie View, TX	W 6–0		
October 12	Houston Junior College*	Blackshear Field; Prairie View, TX (rivalry)	W 32–0		
October 21	vs. Wiley	Fair Park; Dallas, TX	T 0–0		
November 2	Jarvis*	Blackshear Field; Prairie View, TX	W 73–0		
November 11	at Bishop	Bishop Field; Marshall, TX	L 6–14		
November 28	at Texas College	Tyler, TX	T 6–6		
December 7	Samuel Huston	Blackshear Field; Prairie View, TX	W 7–0		
December 13	vs. Alcorn A&M*	Municipal Stadium; Jackson, MS	W 6–0		
January 1	vs. Fisk*	West End Park; Houston, TX (Prairie View Bowl)	L 0–20	6,000–10,000	
*Non-conference game
