= Emmanuel University =

University in Franklin Springs, Georgia, US

- Former name: Franklin Springs Institute (1919–1939) Emmanuel College (1939–2023)
- Motto: Deus Nobiscum (Latin)
- Motto in English: God With Us
- Type: Private college
- Established: 1919
- Religious affiliation: International Pentecostal Holiness Church
- President: Greg Hearn
- Faculty: 41 full-time, 41 part-time
- Students: 850 (fall 2022)
- Undergraduates: 840
- Postgraduates: 10
- Location: Franklin Springs, Georgia, United States; 34.282°N 83.148°W
- Campus: Rural
- Colors: Navy, cardinal, and gold
- Nickname: Lions
- Sporting affiliations: NCAA Division II – Carolinas
- Mascot: The Lion
- Website: eu.edu
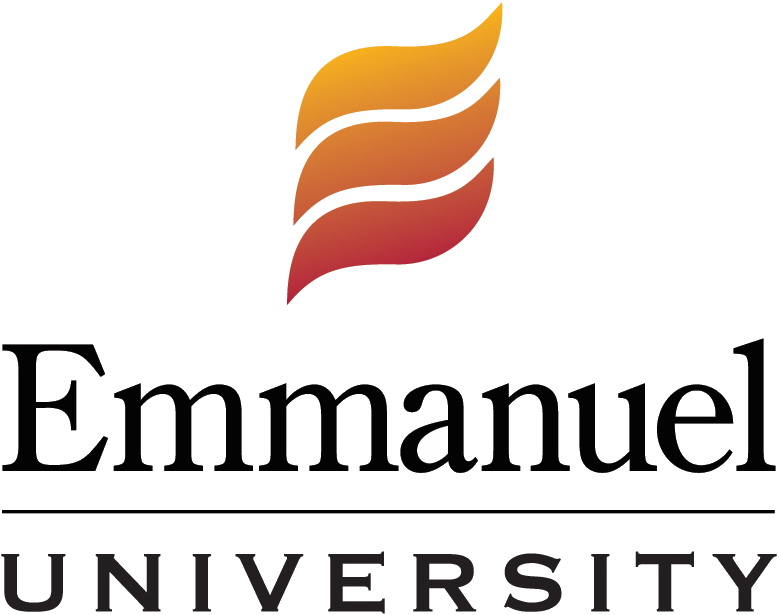

Emmanuel University is a private Christian college in Franklin Springs, Georgia, United States. It is affiliated with the International Pentecostal Holiness Church and enrolls more than 800 students. The college offers both associate and bachelor's degrees.

== History ==
Emmanuel University was founded in 1919 as the Franklin Springs Institute in Franklin Springs, Georgia. In its first years it taught high school courses for grades eight through eleven and three college-level courses. The first buildings were two hotels and a skating rink. In 1931, the college was forced to close for two years during the Great Depression. When it reopened, the new president, Thomas Aaron, began to refocus the institute's priorities from being a high school to a college. In 1939, the name was changed to Emmanuel College and the high school was called Emmanuel Academy.

The year 1967 saw the Southern Association of Colleges and Schools grant the two-year college full accreditation. During the 1970s, a four-year School of Christian Ministries was established and accredited by the American Association of Bible Colleges and in 1991, major changes to curricular offerings also accompanied accreditation as a four-year institution from the Southern Association of Colleges and Schools Commission on Colleges. In 2023, its name changed to Emmanuel University.

== Academics ==
Academic rankings

Baccalaureate
- Washington Monthly: 171 of 259

Regional
- U.S. News & World Report: 41 (tie) of 76

The institution offers over 30 areas of study and confers associate degrees, bachelor's degrees and graduate degrees.

== Athletics ==
Jack and Jane Shaw Athletic Center

The Emmanuel athletic teams are called the Lions. The college is a member of the Division II level of the National Collegiate Athletic Association (NCAA), primarily competing in the Conference Carolinas as a provisional member since the 2014–15 academic year (with NCAA D-II full member status since 2018–19), while its men's lacrosse team competes in the SouthEastern Lacrosse Conference (SELC). Its men's volleyball team competed in the Mid-America Men's Volleyball Intercollegiate Conference (MAMVIC). The Lions were also a member of the National Christian College Athletic Association (NCCAA), primarily competing as an independent in the South Region of the Division I level. The Lions formerly competed in the Southern States Athletic Conference (SSAC; formerly known as Georgia–Alabama–Carolina Conference (GACC) until after the 2003–04 school year) of the National Association of Intercollegiate Athletics (NAIA) from 1999–2000 to 2013–14.

Emmanuel competes in 32 intercollegiate varsity sports: Men's sports include archery, baseball, basketball, bowling, cross country, golf, lacrosse, soccer, swimming, tennis, track & field, triathlon, volleyball and wrestling; while women's sports include acrobatics & tumbling, archery, basketball, bowling, cross country, golf, lacrosse, soccer, softball, swimming, tennis, track & field, triathlon, volleyball and wrestling; and co-ed sports include bass fishing, cheerleading and clay target shooting.

=== Club sports/intramurals ===
For men and women, Emmanuel also offers a wide variety of intramural sports including basketball, football, golf, soccer, tennis, track and field, volleyball, and weightlifting.

=== Athletics expansion ===
In recent years, the college has expanded its athletic department. In 2012 Emmanuel College added men's and women's lacrosse, men's volleyball, and clay target shooting along with opening its 76,000-square-foot (7,100 m^{2}) athletic center that contains a basketball arena, volleyball court, a fitness center, an aerobics room, a swimming pool, a bowling alley, and a Papa John’s. The men's basketball team finished runners up in the NAIA national championship game in 2014, and the cross country team finished third at Nationals in Fall of 2013. The college also announced that men's and women's swimming and men's and women's bowling will be added for the 2013–14 academic year. Wrestling has also been added and will start competing in the 2015–16 school year.

== See also ==
- International Pentecostal Holiness Church
