= Mid-America Men's Volleyball Intercollegiate Conference =

- Conference: NAIA
- Founded: 1994
- Folded: 2015
- Sports fielded: Men's volleyball
- No. of teams: 18
- Website: mamvic.com

The Mid-America Men's Volleyball Intercollegiate Conference (MAMVIC) was an NAIA men's volleyball-only conference. At its largest, the MAMVIC was divided into four conferences: Great Lakes, National, North, and South. It was formerly the NAIA division of MIVA.

== Members at dissolution ==
=== Great Lakes Division ===
Institution	Location	Founded	Type	Enrollment	Nickname	Joined	Left	Current conference
Calumet College of St. Joseph	Whiting, Indiana	1951	Private (Catholic)	1,292	Crimson Wave	????, 2015	2015	Chicagoland
Cardinal Stritch University	Milwaukee, Wisconsin	1931	Private (Catholic)	4,407	Wolves	????	2015	Chicagoland
Cincinnati Christian University	Cincinnati, Ohio	1924	Private (Churches of Christ)	NA	Eagles	2014	2015	Closed in 2019
Lourdes University	Sylvania, Ohio	1958	Private (Catholic)	1,500	Gray Wolves	2012	2015	Wolverine–Hoosier
Robert Morris University	Chicago, Illinois	1913	Private (Nonsectarian)	1,934	Eagles	2012	2015	Chicagoland
Saint Xavier University	Chicago, Illinois	1846	Private (Catholic)	4,252	Cougars	2010	2015	Chicagoland
Siena Heights University	Adrian, Michigan	1919	Private (Catholic)	2,500	Saints	2010	2015	Wolverine–Hoosier
Trinity International University	Deerfield, Illinois	1897	Private (Evangelical Christian)	2,688	Trojans	2015	2015	Dropped athletics

=== National Division ===
Institution	Location	Founded	Type	Enrollment	Nickname	Joined	Left	Current conference
Bluefield College	Bluefield, Virginia	1922	Private (Baptist)	793	Rams	2015	2015	Mid-South
University of California, Merced	Merced, California	2005	Public (University of California system)	7,400	Golden Bobcats	2015	2015	Golden State
Concordia University–Irvine	Irvine, California	1976	Private (Lutheran LCMS)	2,564	Eagles	2013	2015	MPSF (NCAA)
Hope International University	Fullerton, California	1928	Private (Christian)	987	Royals	2012	2015	Golden State
Warner University	Lake Wales, Florida	1968	Private (Church of God)	1,037	Royals	2009	2015	Mid-South

=== North Division ===
Institution	Location	Founded	Type	Enrollment	Nickname	Joined	Left	Current conference
Clarke University	Dubuque, Iowa	1843	Private (Catholic)	1,075	Pride	2008	2015	Heart of America
Culver–Stockton College	Canton, Missouri	1853	Private (Disciples of Christ)	1,066	Wildcats	2014	2015	Heart of America
Graceland University	Lamoni, Iowa	1895	Private (Community of Christ)	2,301	Yellowjackets	1994	2015	Heart of America
Grand View University	Des Moines, Iowa	1896	Private (Lutheran ELCA)	1,988	Vikings	2012	2015	Heart of America
Morningside College	Sioux City, Iowa	1894	Private (United Methodist)	2,824	Mustangs	2015	2015	Great Plains
St. Ambrose University	Davenport, Iowa	1882	Private (Catholic)	3,343	Fighting Bees	2007	2015	Chicagoland

=== South Division ===
Institution	Location	Founded	Type	Enrollment	Nickname	Joined	Left	Current conference
Hannibal–LaGrange University	Hannibal, Missouri	1858	Private (Southern Baptist)	1,200	Trojans	2009	2015	American Midwest
Lindenwood University – Belleville	Belleville, Illinois	2003	Private (Presbyterian)	1,900	Lynx	2014	2015	Closed in 2020
Missouri Baptist University	St. Louis, Missouri	1828	Private (Southern Baptist)	2,800	Spartans	2006	2015	American Midwest
Missouri Valley College	Marshall, Missouri	1889	Private (Presbyterian)	1,728	Vikings	????	2015	Heart of America
Park University	Parkville, Missouri	1875	Private (Nonsectarian)	2,340	Pirates	1994	2015	Heart of America

== Former members ==
Institution	Location	Founded	Type	Enrollment	Nickname	Joined	Left	Current conference
Ambassador College	Big Sandy, Texas	1947	Private (Worldwide Church of God)	NA	??	1994	1997	Closed 1997
Calumet College of St. Joseph	Whiting, Indiana	1951	Private (Catholic)	1,292	Crimson Wave	????	2006	Chicagoland
Columbia College	Columbia, Missouri	1851	Private (Nonsectarian)	4,000	Cougars	1997	200?	Folded Team
Emmanuel College	Franklin Springs, Georgia	1919	Private (Pentecostal)	760	Lions	2013	2014	Conference Carolinas (D-II)
Johnson & Wales University	Denver, Colorado	1914	Private (Nonsectarian)	1,291	Wildcats	2006	2014	Folded Team
Lindenwood University	Saint Charles, Missouri	1827	Private (Presbyterian)	11,904	Lions	????	2015	MIVA (D-II)
Marycrest International University	Davenport, Iowa	1939	Private (Catholic)	NA	Eagles	1994	2002	Closed 2002
Moody Bible Institute	Chicago, Illinois	1886	Private (Christian revival)	3,442	Archers	2007	2011	Folded Team
Newman University	Wichita, Kansas	1933	Private (Catholic)	3,170	Jets	????	2007	Folded Team
Peru State College	Peru, Nebraska	1865	Public	2,422	Bobcats	????	2007	Folded Team
Tri-State University	Angola, Indiana	1884	Private (Nonsectarian)	5,074	Thunder	1993	2002	MIAA (D-III)
William Woods University	Fulton, Missouri	1870	Private/Disciples of Christ	2,300	Owls	1997	200?	Folded Team
