= Sherman Simmons =

American football coach

Biographical details
- Born: Winston-Salem, North Carolina, U.S.
- Education: Winston-Salem State University (1982); Northwestern State University

Playing career
- 1972–1973: Livingstone
- Position: Linebacker

Coaching career (HC unless noted)
- 1979–1981: Alabama A&M (DB)
- 1982–1984: Albany State (DB)
- 1985–1988: Northwestern State (DB)
- 1989–1994: Southern (DC)
- 1995–1996: Johnson C. Smith (DC)
- 1997–1998: North Carolina A&T (DC)
- 1999–2002: Morehouse (DC)
- 2003–2005: Allen
- 2007–2009: Winston-Salem State (DC)
- 2010–2011: Shaw (DL)
- 2012: Livingstone (DC)

Head coaching record
- Overall: 10–16

Sherman Simmons is an American former college football coach. He was the head football coach at Allen University from 2003 to 2005. He also coached for Alabama A&M, Albany State, Northwestern State, Southern, Johnson C. Smith, North Carolina A&T, Morehouse, Winston-Salem State, Shaw, and Livingstone. He played college football at Livingstone as a linebacker.

== Head coaching record ==
Year	Team	Overall	Conference	Standing	Bowl/playoffs
Allen Yellow Jackets (NAIA independent) (2003–2005)
2003	Allen	4–6			
2004	Allen	2–6			
2005	Allen	4–4			
Allen:		10–16			
Total:		10–16			
