= Mary B. Edelen =

American politician

Member of the South Dakota House of Representatives
- In office 1973–1980
- In office 1983–1992

Personal details
- Born: December 9, 1944 (age 81) Vermillion, South Dakota, U.S.
- Party: Republican
- Spouse: Joseph
- Children: 3
- Education: Cottey College; University of South Dakota; Trinity University

Mary Beaty Edelen (born December 9, 1944) is an American politician. She served as a Republican member of the South Dakota House of Representatives.

== Life and career ==
Edelen was born in Vermillion, South Dakota. She attended Vermillion High School and Cottey College. She received a B.A. from the University of South Dakota in 1967 and an M.A. from Trinity University.

Edelen served in the South Dakota House of Representatives from 1973 to 1980 and again from 1983 to 1992, representing Clay and Union counties and becoming the first woman elected from her district. She served as the president of the National Order of Women Legislators in 1986.
