= Arthur J. Willis =

American football coach, athletics administrator

Coaching career (HC unless noted)
- 1924: Western University (KS)
- 1925: Langston
- 1926: Liberty semipro
- 1928: Fisk (assistant)
- 1929: Prairie View A&M
- 1930: Livingstone
- 1931: Claflin

Administrative career (AD unless noted)
- 1931: Claflin

Head coaching record
- Bowls: 0–1

Arthur J. Willis was an American college football coach and athletics administrator. He reportedly began coaching college football at least as early as 1914, and in 1924, he was the head football coach at Western University in Kansas. The following year, he coached the football team at Oklahoma Colored Agricultural and Normal University—now known as Langston University. In 1926, he coached a semi-professional football team in Liberty, Missouri. Willis was the director of physical education and assistant coach at Fisk University in Nashville, Tennessee before moving on to Prairie View Normal and Industrial College—now known as Prairie View A&M University—in Prairie View, Texas, where he was head football coach in 1929. At the time of his debut at Prairie View, it was reported that: "He has coached for the past 15 years, playing practically all of the leading schools of every conference, and during that time various teams have played 142 games in football, winning 120, losing six and tying seven others".

In 1930, Willis was hired as the head football coach at Livingstone College in Salisbury, North Carolina. The following year, he went to Claflin College—now known as Claflin University—in Orangeburg, South Carolina, as head football coach and athletic director.

== Head coaching record ==
=== College ===
Year	Team	Overall	Conference	Standing	Bowl/playoffs
Western University Bulldogs () (1924)
1924	Western				
Western:					
Langston Lions (Independent) (1925)
1925	Langston	2–1–1			
Langston:		2–1–1			
Prairie View Panthers (Southwestern Athletic Conference) (1929)
1929	Prairie View	6–2–2	1–1–2	3rd	L Prairie View
Prairie View:		6–2–2	1–1–2		
Livingstone Blue Bears (Independent) (1930)
1930	Livingstone	0–7–2			
Livingstone:		0–7–2			
Claflin Panthers (South Atlantic Intercollegiate Athletic Association) (1931)
1931	Claflin	6–4			
Claflin:		6–4			
Total:					
