= John D. Marshall (American football) =

American football and tennis coach (1930–2008)

Biographical details
- Born: April 26, 1930; Bowling Green, Virginia, U.S.
- Died: April 29, 2008 (aged 78); Fayetteville, North Carolina, U.S.
- Education: South Carolina State University (1952)

Coaching career (HC unless noted)

Football
- ?: Hillside HS (SC)
- 1961–?: Elizabeth City State (assistant)
- 1964: Langston (assistant)
- 1965–1972: Livingstone
- 1973: Johnson C. Smith (assistant)
- 1974–1976: Virginia State

Tennis
- 1961–?: Elizabeth City State

Administrative career (AD unless noted)
- 1970–?: Livingstone
- 1977–1978: South Carolina State (assistant AD)
- 1979–1980: Virginia Union
- 1980–1989: Fayetteville State

Head coaching record
- Overall: 38–64–1 (college football)

John D. Marshall Jr. (April 26, 1930 – April 29, 2008) was an American football and tennis coach and college athletics administrator. He served as the head coach at Livingstone College in Salisbury, North Carolina from 1965 to 1972 and at Virginia State University in Petersburg, Virginia from 1974 to 1976, compiling a career college football coaching record of 38–64–1.

Marshall graduated from South Carolina State College—now known as South Carolina State University—and earned a master's degree from Indiana University. He began his coach career at Hillside High School in Heath Springs, South Carolina. In 1961 he moved to Elizabeth City State College—now known as Elizabeth City State University—in Elizabeth City, North Carolina as assistant football coach and head tennis coach. After spending a year as an assistant football coach and a professor of physical education at Langston University in Langston, Oklahoma, Marshall was hired as the head football coach at Livingstone in 1965. In 1973, he was hired as assistant professor of physical education and assistant football coach at Johnson C. Smith University in Charlotte, North Carolina.

In July 1979, Marshall became the athletic director at Virginia Union University in Richmond, Virginia. A year later he resign to take the same post at Fayetteville State University in Fayetteville, North Carolina.

== Head coaching record ==
Year	Team	Overall	Conference	Standing	Bowl/playoffs
Livingstone Blue Bears (Central Intercollegiate Athletic Association) (1965–1972)
1965	Livingstone	3–5	3–5	13th	
1966	Livingstone	6–3–1	5–1–1	3rd	
1967	Livingstone	3–6	2–4	13th	
1968	Livingstone	4–4	4–3	8th	
1969	Livingstone	5–3	4–3	8th	
1970	Livingstone	2–7	1–4	6th (Southern)	
1971	Livingstone	4–6	3–3	T–3rd (Southern)	
1972	Livingstone	2–8	0–4	5th (Southern)	
Livingstone:		29–42–1	22–27–1		
Virginia State Trojans (Central Intercollegiate Athletic Association) (1974–1976)
1974	Virginia State	3–7	2–4	8th	
1975	Virginia State	2–8	2–5	8th	
1976	Virginia State	4–7	3–5	T–7th	
Virginia State:		9–22	7–14		
Total:		38–64–1			
