= Meridian Independent School District =

School district in Texas

Meridian Independent School District is a public school district based in Meridian, Texas, United States. In 2009, the school district was rated "academically acceptable" by the Texas Education Agency.

== Schools ==
- Meridian High School (Grades 6-12)

During 2022‍–‍2023, Meridian High School had an enrollment of 187 students in grades 6‍–‍12 and a student to teacher ratio of 7.26.

- Meridian Elementary School (Grades PK-5)

During 2022‍–‍2023, Meridian Elementary School had an enrollment of 170 students in grades PK‍–‍5 and a student to teacher ratio of 8.29.
