= 2025 NAIA flag football season =

- Total No. of teams: 21
- Regular season: February 1 – April 26, 2025
- National championship: The University of Kansas Health System Training Facility; Riverside, MO; May 5–7, 2025
- Champion(s): Ottawa (KS)

The 2025 NAIA flag football season was the component of the 2025 college football season organized by the National Association of Intercollegiate Athletics (NAIA) in the United States. It was the fifth season of the NAIA sponsoring flag football as a varsity women's sport, in contrast with traditional, full-contact college football which is played almost exclusively by men. With 21 schools playing in this season, it remained classified as an "emerging" sport by the NAIA. After the previous four championships had been held in Atlanta, the postseason tournament was moved to the Kansas City metropolitan area for this season, with the finals taking place at The University of Kansas Health System Training Facility in Riverside, Missouri. The Ottawa Braves won their fifth consecutive championship with a 34–20 victory over the Keiser Seahawks, completing an undefeated season.
