= Cottey College =

Private women's college in Nevada, Missouri, US

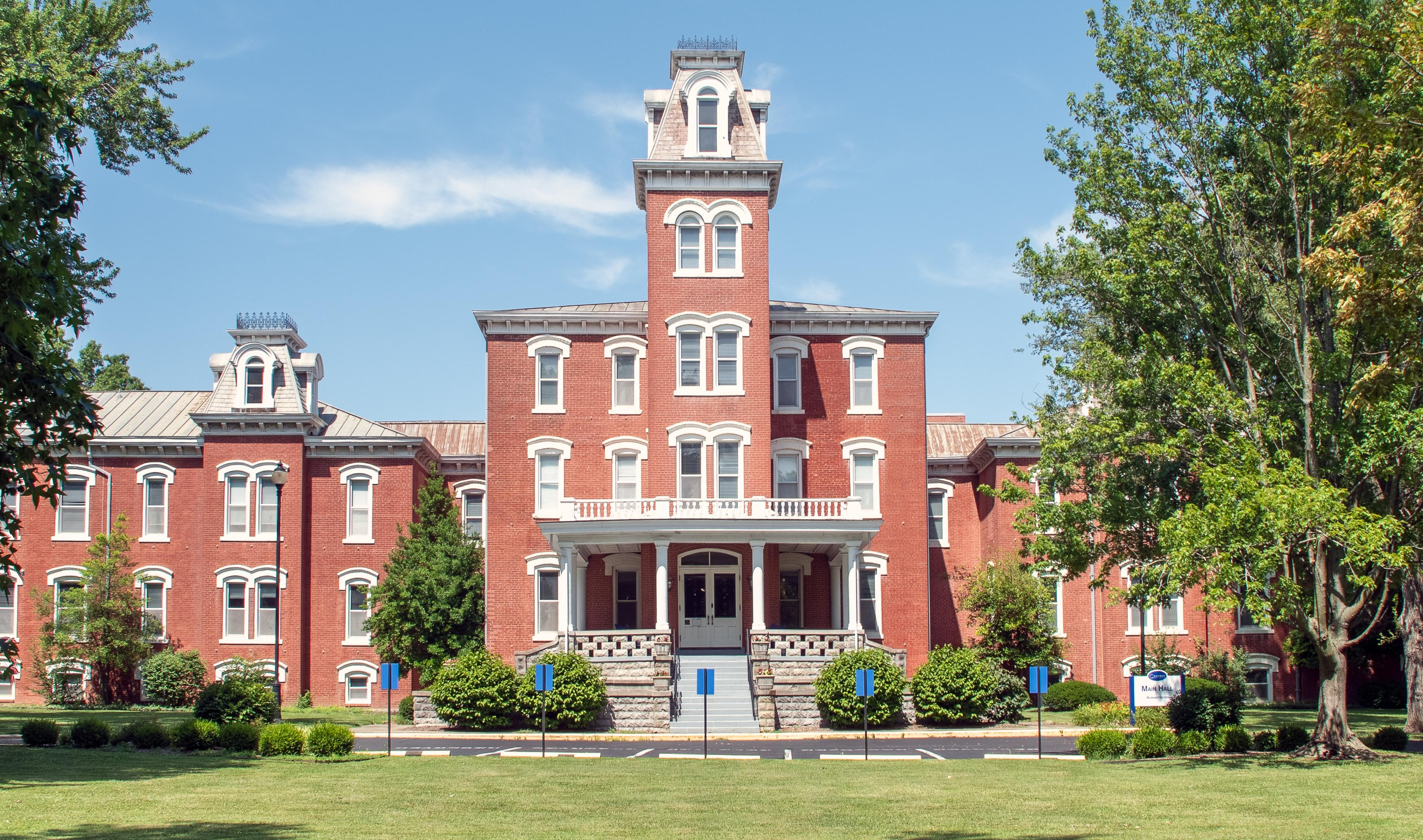
- Former name: Vernon Seminary (1884–1886)
- Motto: Creators of Incredible Futures
- Type: Private women's college
- Established: 1884; 142 years ago
- Affiliations: P.E.O. Sisterhood
- Endowment: $115.6 million (2024)
- President: Stefanie Niles
- Faculty: 46
- Administrative staff: 61
- Students: 266
- Location: Nevada, Missouri, U.S. 37.8381°N 94.3704°W
- Campus: Small town
- Colors: Blue, yellow and white
- Nickname: Comets
- Sporting affiliations: NAIA – American Midwest
- Mascots: Comet (The mascot of Cottey sports teams), The Duck (The "Senior Class" mascot)
- Website: www.cottey.edu

Cottey College is a private women's college in Nevada, Missouri. It was founded by Virginia Alice (Cottey) Stockard in 1884. Since 1927, it has been supported by the P.E.O. Sisterhood, a philanthropic women's organization based in Des Moines, Iowa. For most of its history, Cottey was a two-year liberal arts college, and in 2011 it achieved accreditation as a four-year baccalaureate-granting college. It had 266 students enrolled in 2023.

Cottey is situated on 66 acres (26.7 ha) of land in Nevada, Missouri, the Vernon County seat and a rural town of 8,198 people (by the 2020 estimate). The main campus occupies 11 city blocks. Five blocks south is B.I.L. Hill, a private lodge that rests above a public park which includes a walking trail, gazebo, and small lake. BIL Hill is used by Cottey students, faculty, and staff for recreation, concerts, bonfires, picnics, suite nights, and other traditions.

== History ==
=== Beginnings ===
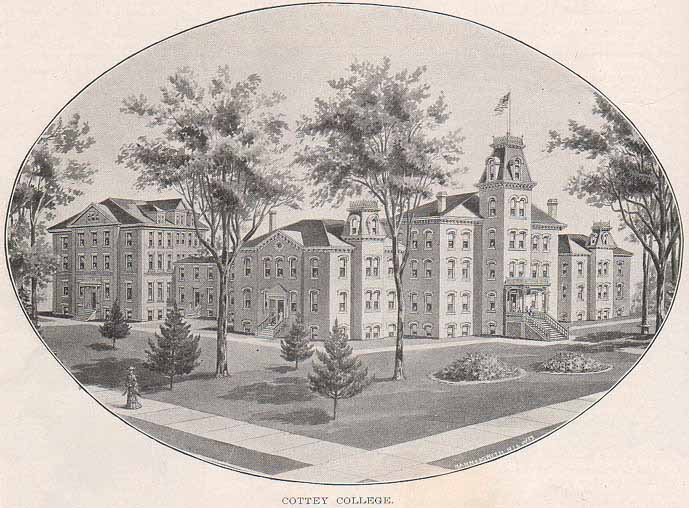
Cottey College, circa 1910

Cottey College was founded by Virginia Alice Cottey (known as Alice Cottey) in 1884; she originally called it Vernon Seminary, based on the county. After teaching at Central College in Lexington, Missouri, since 1875, Cottey decided she wanted to establish her own school. She had saved $3,000, and her sisters Dora and Mary lent her nearly $3,000 of their savings to begin the school.

Several towns bid for the opportunity to host the new girls' school, including Fort Worth, Texas, and several towns in Missouri. After much thought, Cottey accepted the offer of Nevada in Vernon County, although it was not the most generous. Residents donated 6 acres (2.428 ha) of land upon which Cottey had a three-story brick building constructed. After the college expanded, this building came to be known as Main Hall.

Vernon Seminary opened in 1884 as a primary, intermediate, and collegiate preparatory school. In those early years, before educational standardization in the U.S., placement of students depended more upon their accomplishments than age.

In 1886, the school's name was officially changed to Cottey College. By 1932, the college consisted only of the higher education part, offering a two-year program.

In 1927, Cottey offered the college to the P.E.O. Sisterhood (Philanthropic Educational Organization), an international organization based in Des Moines, Iowa, that supports women's education. She made a condition that they raise a $200,000 endowment for the college (about $2.9 million in 2018 dollars), in order to maintain and operate it for the long term. The P.E.O. accepted, and has since owned and operated the private Cottey College.

=== Enrollment ===
Enrollment grew from 28 to 72 students during the first year, and by 1910 there were 250 students. Attendance dropped during the 1930s and '40s, but rose to maximum capacity of 350 by the 1970s.

With more two-year local community colleges opening in the later 20th century, Cottey had a slow decline in enrollment during the 1990s and into the 2000s. It was also a period when some young women preferred co-ed institutions in larger communities. The college worked to restore enrollment and to expand its offerings to a full, four-year curriculum, which it achieved in 2011. By 2017, the number of students totaled 307.

== Student life ==
=== Residential life ===
Blanche Skiff Ross Memorial Library

Students come from more than 40 states and in the 2018–19 school year, international students came from 20 different countries.

Cottey students live in one of three campus halls (P.E.O., Reeves, and Robertson), each having between 10 and 14 suites. These include a few bedrooms, a bathroom, and a kitchenette arranged around a living room. Student rooms have typical college furnishings. Suites are occupied by between 8 and 12 students. Most suites are sponsored by a P.E.O. chapter, and suite members usually receive several care packages from these P.E.O.s during the year. Sponsorship of some suites has changed over time, their names changing as well.

=== Residence halls ===
P.E.O. Hall is the oldest of the existing dormitories, and was erected in 1939. It has 10 suites, housing about 100 students. It was the first building to be paid by the P.E.O. Sisterhood after it acquired the college.

Reeves Hall was built in 1949 on the site where a prior Cottey dormitory, Missouri Hall, had burned down in 1940. Like P.E.O., it houses 10 suites and about 100 students. It is noted for having the largest basement of the three halls, and a foyer reminiscent of a classic hotel lobby.

Robertson (Robbie) Hall

Robertson Hall (Robbie) was the last Cottey dormitory to be built, being erected in 1959. It houses 14 suites (about 150 students) as well as the college's dining facility, Raney Dining Hall and the Centennial Room. It is noted for being the only hall with air conditioning and an elevator, and for having the smallest basement.

Each hall has recreational rooms, computer suites, laundry facilities, and quiet study rooms elsewhere in each building.

Cottey has had several prior dormitories, including Rosemary Hall (est. 1903) and Missouri Hall (1928–1940). Main Hall was also used as a dormitory from 1884 to 1939.

In 2000, the college established a spring trip abroad for second-year students and other eligible students.

== Athletics ==
The Cottey athletic teams are called the Comets. The college is a member of the National Association of Intercollegiate Athletics (NAIA), primarily competing in the American Midwest Conference (AMC) since the 2022–23 academic year. When intercollegiate athletics were re-introduced to the college in the 1998–99 academic year, the Comets competed in the National Junior College Athletic Association (NJCAA). The Comets also previously competed as an NAIA Independent within the Continental Athletic Conference from 2018–19 to 2021–22.

Cottey competes in nine intercollegiate varsity sports: basketball, cross country, eSports, flag football (added in 2020), golf, softball, track and field (indoor and outdoor) and volleyball.

== Notable alumnae ==
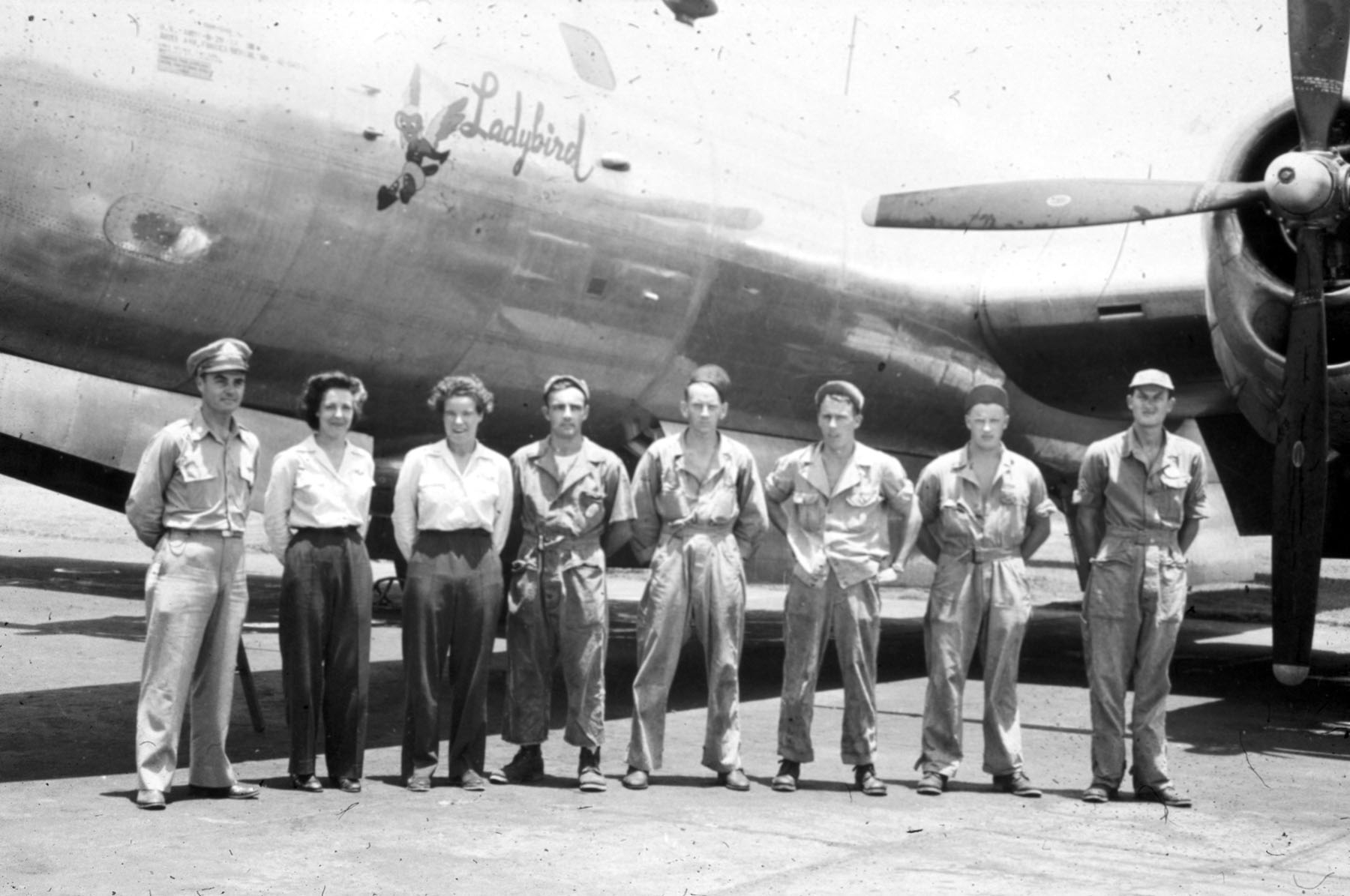
Dora Dougherty Strother (third from left) in front of B-29 "Ladybird"

- Jetta Carleton '33 – writer of The Moonflower Vine (1962), a New York Times Bestseller
- Dora Dougherty Strother '41 – Women Airforce Service Pilot, one of the first two women to pilot a B-29
- Mary Edelen '65 – former member of the South Dakota House of Representatives
- Marilyn Harris Springer '51 – best-selling writer of the Eden series and Hatter Fox
- Ruby Kless Sondock '44 – first woman justice on the Texas Supreme Court
- Carol Littleton '62 – film editor, nominated for an Academy Award for E.T. The Extra-Terrestrial
- Judith McCulloh – folklorist, ethnomusicologist, and university press editor
- Judith P. Morgan – painter
- Francine I. Neff '46 – Treasurer of the United States, 1974–1977
