= Thomas Night Hawks =

Coordinates: 30.8160°N 83.9686°W

- University: Thomas University
- Nickname: Night Hawks
- Association: NAIA
- Conference: Southern States (primary); The Sun (football)
- Athletic director: Jessica Sanders
- Location: Thomasville, Georgia
- Varsity teams: 14 (7 men's, 7 women's)
- Football stadium: Veteran's Memorial Stadium
- Basketball arena: TU Gymnasium
- Baseball stadium: Varnedoe Stadium
- Softball stadium: Armory Field
- Soccer stadium: TU Soccer Complex
- Colors: Hunter Green and White
- Website: tunighthawks.com
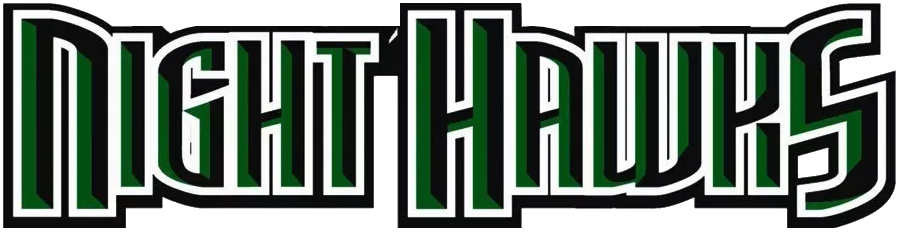

The Thomas Night Hawks are the athletic teams that represent Thomas University, located in Thomasville, Georgia, in intercollegiate sports as a member of the National Association of Intercollegiate Athletics (NAIA), primarily competing in the Southern States Athletic Conference (SSAC).

In the 2013–14 season, basketball returned to Thomas after a 13-year hiatus. In the inaugural game, the Nighthawks men were victorious over visiting Florida National University by a score of 82–71. In 2014, the school added a competitive dance team. In 2022, football was added.

On July 1, 2022, Thomas announced that they would leave the Sun Conference to join the Southern States Athletic Conference (SSAC), starting in the 2023–24 academic year.

== Conference affiliations ==
NAIA

- Sun Conference (2012–2023)
- Southern States Athletic Conference (2023–present)

== Varsity teams ==
Thomas competes in 14 intercollegiate varsity sports:

Men's sports	Women's sports
Baseball	Basketball
Basketball	Cross country
Cross country	Flag football
Football	Soccer
Soccer	Softball
Swimming	Swimming
Track and field	Track and field

== Achievements ==
In 2004, the Softball team won the NAIA national championship. The Men's Soccer team have won the Sun Conference Tournament in 2013 and 2014, as well as The Sun Conference Regular Season championship in 2018.
