= Warner Royals =

Coordinates: 27.8263°N 81.6022°W

- University: Warner University
- Association: NAIA
- Conference: The Sun (primary); Mid-South (men's volleyball)
- Athletic director: Chrissy Moskovits
- Location: Lake Wales, Florida
- First season: 1973; 53 years ago
- Varsity teams: 19 (7 men's, 9 women's, 3 co-ed)
- Football stadium: Tye Athletic Field
- Basketball arena: Turner Athletic Center
- Baseball stadium: Royals Baseball Field
- Softball stadium: Daly Field
- Soccer stadium: Royals Soccer Field
- Lacrosse stadium: Tye Athletic Field
- Nickname: Royals
- Colors: Blue and Gold
- Website: warnerroyals.com

The Warner Royals are the athletic teams for Warner University in Lake Wales, Florida, in intercollegiate sports as a member of the National Association of Intercollegiate Athletics (NAIA), primarily competing in the Sun Conference (formerly known as the Florida Sun Conference (FSC) until after the 2007–08 school year) for most of its sports since the 1990–91 academic year; while its men's volleyball team competes in the Mid-South Conference (MSC). They are also a member of the National Christian College Athletic Association (NCCAA), primarily competing as an independent in the South Region of the Division I level. Their rivals are the Webber Warriors.

== Varsity teams ==
Warner competes in 19 intercollegiate varsity sports

Men's sports	Women's sports
Baseball	Basketball
Basketball	Beach volleyball
Cross country	Cross country
Football	Flag football
Soccer	Lacrosse
Track and field	Soccer
Volleyball	Softball
	Track and field
	Volleyball
Co-ed sports
Clay target
eSports
Strength sports

=== Football ===
The university added football for the 2013 season. The team initially played as an NAIA Independent program with a mixed schedule of NAIA, NCAA Division II and NCAA Division I FCS competition. The Royals left independent status after the inaugural season when The Sun Conference announced football as a conference sport starting in the 2014 season. After two seasons, the conference announced a football merger with the Mid-South Conference in 2016. Warner and the other conference rivals became affiliate members in the Mid-South, participating in the Sun Division for football. Their football team gained national recognition after losing 98–0 to Stephen F. Austin on September 24, 2022.

=== Men's volleyball ===
Warner University was the first college/university to offer a varsity men's volleyball program in the state of Florida. The men's volleyball program participates in the SEC conference. The program initially competed in the Mid-America Men's Volleyball Intercollegiate Conference (MAMVIC). The program made back-to-back appearances in the NAIA Men's Volleyball National Invitational Tournament in 2011 and 2012.
