= List of Mid-South Conference football standings =

This is a list of yearly Mid-South Conference football standings.

== Mid-South Conference football standings ==
=== NAIA Division II (1989–1996) ===
1989 Mid-South Conference football standings
	Conf.					Overall
Team	W		L		T	W		L		T
No. 18 Georgetown (KY) $^	6	–	0	–	0	7	–	3	–	1
Cumberland (KY)	5	–	1	–	0	7	–	3	–	0
Union (KY)	3	–	3	–	0	4	–	5	–	1
Evansville	3	–	3	–	0	4	–	6	–	0
Campbellsville	2	–	3	–	1	2	–	7	–	1
Kentucky Wesleyan	1	–	4	–	1	3	–	6	–	1
Tennessee Wesleyan	0	–	6	–	0	0	–	10	–	0
$ – Conference champion; ^ – NAIA Division II playoff participant; Rankings from NAIA Division II poll

1990 Mid-South Conference football standings
	Conf.					Overall
Team	W		L		T	W		L		T
No. 8 Georgetown (KY) $^	5	–	0	–	0	9	–	2	–	0
No. 24 Cumberland (KY)	4	–	1	–	0	7	–	2	–	1
Campbellsville	3	–	2	–	0	8	–	2	–	0
Union (KY)	1	–	4	–	0	5	–	5	–	0
Evansville	1	–	4	–	0	3	–	7	–	0
Tennessee Wesleyan	1	–	4	–	0	3	–	7	–	0
Lambuth *	0	–	0	–	0	2	–	7	–	0
Cumberland (TN) *	0	–	0	–	0	0	–	8	–	0
$ – Conference champion; ^ – NAIA Division II playoff participant * – ineligible for conference title; Rankings from NAIA Division II poll

1991 Mid-South Conference football standings
	Conf.					Overall
Team	W		L		T	W		L		T
No. 2 Georgetown (KY) $^	6	–	0	–	0	13	–	1	–	0
No. 21 Campbellsville	4	–	2	–	0	9	–	2	–	0
Union (KY)	3	–	3	–	0	6	–	4	–	0
Evansville	3	–	3	–	0	5	–	5	–	0
Cumberland (KY)	3	–	3	–	0	4	–	5	–	0
Lambuth	2	–	4	–	0	3	–	7	–	0
Tusculum	0	–	6	–	0	0	–	10	–	0
$ – Conference champion; ^ – NAIA Division II playoff participant; Rankings from NAIA Division II poll

1992 Mid-South Conference football standings
	Conf.					Overall
Team	W		L		T	W		L		T
No. 17 Union (KY) +	4	–	1	–	0	8	–	2	–	0
No. 11 Georgetown (KY) +^	4	–	1	–	0	8	–	3	–	0
No. 20 Campbellsville +	4	–	1	–	0	7	–	3	–	0
Tusculum	2	–	3	–	0	4	–	6	–	0
Cumberland (KY)	1	–	4	–	0	3	–	7	–	0
Lambuth	0	–	5	–	0	3	–	7	–	0
+ – Conference co-champions; ^ – NAIA Division II playoff participant; Rankings from NAIA Division II poll

1993 Mid-South Conference football standings
	Conf.					Overall
Team	W		L		T	W		L		T
No. 17 Georgetown (KY) $^	4	–	1	–	0	7	–	4	–	0
Lambuth	3	–	2	–	0	6	–	4	–	0
Tusculum	2	–	3	–	0	5	–	5	–	0
Union (KY)	2	–	3	–	0	5	–	5	–	0
Cumberland (KY)	2	–	3	–	0	2	–	9	–	0
Campbellsville	1	–	4	–	0	2	–	9	–	0
$ – Conference champion; ^ – NAIA Division II playoff participant; Rankings from NAIA Division II poll

1994 Mid-South Conference football standings
	Conf.					Overall
Team	W		L		T	W		L		T
No. 7 Lambuth $^	4	–	1	–	0	10	–	3	–	0
Tusculum	3	–	2	–	0	7	–	3	–	0
Union (KY)	3	–	2	–	0	7	–	3	–	0
Georgetown (KY)	3	–	2	–	0	3	–	6	–	0
Cumberland (KY)	1	–	4	–	0	5	–	5	–	0
Campbellsville	1	–	4	–	0	3	–	7	–	0
$ – Conference champion; ^ – NAIA Division II playoff participant; Rankings from NAIA Division II poll

1995 Mid-South Conference football standings
	Conf.					Overall
Team	W		L		T	W		L		T
No. 4 Lambuth $^	7	–	0	–	1	10	–	1	–	1
No. 16 Union (KY)	6	–	1	–	1	7	–	2	–	1
Georgetown (KY)	6	–	2	–	0	6	–	4	–	0
Cumberland (KY)	5	–	3	–	0	6	–	4	–	0
Cumberland (TN)	4	–	4	–	0	4	–	6	–	0
Tusculum	3	–	5	–	0	3	–	6	–	0
Campbellsville	2	–	6	–	0	3	–	8	–	0
North Greenville	2	–	6	–	0	5	–	6	–	0
Bethel (TN)	0	–	8	–	0	0	–	10	–	0
$ – Conference champion; ^ – NAIA Division II playoff participant; Rankings from NAIA Division II poll

1996 Mid-South Conference football standings
	Conf.			Overall
Team	W		L	W		L
No. 3 Lambuth $^	7	–	0	9	–	2
No. 18 Cumberland (TN)	6	–	1	8	–	2
Campbellsville	4	–	3	6	–	4
North Greenville	3	–	4	6	–	4
Georgetown (KY)	3	–	4	4	–	5
Union (KY)	3	–	4	4	–	6
Cumberland (KY)	1	–	6	2	–	7
Bethel (TN)	1	–	6	2	–	9
$ – Conference champion; ^ – NAIA playoff participant; Rankings from NAIA Division II poll

=== NAIA (1997–present) ===
1997 Mid-South Conference football standings
	Conf.			Overall
Team	W		L	W		L
No. 11 Campbellsville +^	5	–	1	7	–	3
Georgetown (KY) +	5	–	1	5	–	4
Cumberland (TN)	4	–	2	5	–	4
Cumberland (KY)	3	–	3	5	–	5
Lambuth	2	–	4	4	–	6
Union (KY)	2	–	4	2	–	8
North Greenville	0	–	6	1	–	8
+ – Conference co-champions; ^ – NAIA playoff participant; Rankings from NAIA poll

1998 Mid-South Conference football standings
	Conf.			Overall
Team	W		L	W		L
No. 9 Georgetown (KY) +^	6	–	1	9	–	3
No. 20 North Greenville +	6	–	1	7	–	3
No. 18 Lambuth	5	–	2	7	–	3
No. 24 Campbellsville	4	–	3	7	–	4
Cumberland (TN)	4	–	3	6	–	5
Belhaven	2	–	5	4	–	6
Cumberland (KY)	1	–	6	3	–	7
Union (KY)	0	–	7	0	–	10
+ – Conference co-champions; ^ – NAIA playoff participant; Rankings from NAIA poll

1999 Mid-South Conference football standings
	Conf.			Overall
Team	W		L	W		L
No. 1 Georgetown (KY) $^	7	–	0	13	–	1
No. 14 Lambuth ^	6	–	1	8	–	4
North Greenville	5	–	2	5	–	6
Belhaven	4	–	3	7	–	4
Campbellsville	2	–	5	2	–	8
Cumberland (KY)	2	–	5	3	–	8
Cumberland (TN)	2	–	5	2	–	8
Union (KY)	0	–	7	0	–	11
$ – Conference champion; ^ – NAIA playoff participant; Rankings from NAIA Coaches' Poll

2000 Mid-South Conference football standings
	Conf.			Overall
Team	W		L	W		L
No. 1 Georgetown (KY) $^	8	–	0	14	–	0
No. 11 Lambuth ^	6	–	1	7	–	4
No. 17 Campbellsville	5	–	2	7	–	4
Belhaven	4	–	3	5	–	5
Cumberland (TN)	3	–	5	5	–	5
Union (KY)	2	–	5	3	–	7
Cumberland (KY)	1	–	6	2	–	8
North Greenville	0	–	8	0	–	10
$ – Conference champion; ^ – NAIA playoff participant; Rankings from NAIA Coaches' Poll

2001 Mid-South Conference football standings
	Conf.			Overall
Team	W		L	W		L
No. 1 Georgetown (KY) $^	7	–	0	14	–	0
No. 10 Campbellsville ^	5	–	2	10	–	3
No. 23 Cumberland (TN)	4	–	2	6	–	3
Belhaven	3	–	4	4	–	6
Lambuth	3	–	4	3	–	6
Union (KY)	2	–	4	2	–	7
Pikeville	2	–	5	3	–	7
Cumberland (KY)	1	–	6	3	–	6
$ – Conference champion; ^ – NAIA playoff participant; Rankings from NAIA Coaches' Poll

2002 Mid-South Conference football standings
	Conf.			Overall
Team	W		L	W		L
No. 2 Georgetown (KY) $^	8	–	0	12	–	2
No. 23 Cumberland (TN)	6	–	2	6	–	4
Lambuth	5	–	3	6	–	4
Pikeville	4	–	4	6	–	4
Belhaven	4	–	4	5	–	5
Campbellsville	3	–	5	4	–	6
Cumberland (KY)	3	–	5	4	–	6
Virginia–Wise	2	–	6	3	–	7
Union (KY)	1	–	7	2	–	8
$ – Conference champion; ^ – NAIA playoff participant; Rankings from NAIA Coaches' Poll

2003 Mid-South Conference football standings
	Conf.			Overall
Team	W		L	W		L
No. 11 Georgetown (KY) +^	8	–	1	9	–	3
No. 10 Lambuth +^	8	–	1	9	–	3
No. 16 Campbellsville	7	–	2	9	–	2
No. 20 Cumberland (KY)	7	–	2	8	–	2
Pikeville	3	–	6	4	–	6
Union (KY)	3	–	6	4	–	7
Cumberland (TN)	3	–	6	3	–	7
Belhaven	2	–	7	4	–	7
Virginia–Wise	2	–	7	3	–	8
Bethel (TN)	2	–	7	2	–	9
+ – Conference co-champions; ^ – NAIA playoff participant; Rankings from NAIA Coaches' Poll

2004 Mid-South Conference football standings
	Conf.			Overall
Team	W		L	W		L
No. 3 Georgetown (KY) $^	10	–	0	12	–	1
No. 23 Pikeville	8	–	2	8	–	3
No. 16 Cumberland (KY)	7	–	3	8	–	3
Lambuth	6	–	4	6	–	4
Campbellsville	5	–	5	6	–	5
Bethel (TN)	5	–	5	5	–	7
Kentucky Wesleyan	4	–	6	4	–	7
Union (KY)	4	–	6	4	–	7
Belhaven	3	–	7	4	–	7
Virginia–Wise	3	–	7	3	–	8
Cumberland (TN)	0	–	10	0	–	10
$ – Conference champion; ^ – NAIA playoff participant; Rankings from NAIA Coaches' Poll

2005 Mid-South Conference football standings
	Conf.			Overall
Team	W		L	W		L
East Division
No. 5 Georgetown (KY) x^	5	–	0	9	–	3
No. 21 Cumberlands (KY)	3	–	2	8	–	3
No. 15 Pikeville ^	3	–	2	7	–	3
Union (KY)	3	–	2	4	–	6
Virginia–Wise	1	–	4	4	–	7
Shorter	0	–	5	2	–	8
West Division
No. 23 Bethel (TN) x	5	–	0	7	–	4
Belhaven	3	–	2	5	–	6
Lambuth	3	–	2	5	–	6
Kentucky Wesleyan	2	–	3	3	–	7
Campbellsville	2	–	3	2	–	8
Cumberland (TN)	0	–	5	2	–	8
x – Division champion/co-champions; ^ – NAIA playoff participant; Rankings from NAIA Coaches' Poll

2006 Mid-South Conference football standings
	Conf.			Overall
Team	W		L	W		L
East Division
No. 10 Georgetown (KY) x^	5	–	0	9	–	2
No. 24 Virginia–Wise	3	–	2	8	–	3
Cumberlands (KY)	3	–	2	6	–	4
Pikeville	2	–	3	4	–	6
Union (KY)	1	–	4	2	–	8
West Virginia Tech	1	–	4	1	–	10
West Division
No. 7 Bethel (TN) x^†	5	–	0	10	–	3
Belhaven	4	–	1	6	–	5
Shorter	3	–	2	6	–	5
Lambuth	1	–	4	4	–	7
Cumberland (TN)	1	–	4	3	–	7
Campbellsville	1	–	4	2	–	8
x – Division champion/co-champions; ^ – NAIA playoff participant † – Bethel forfeited all ten wins, including games against seven Mid-South teams.; Rankings from NAIA Coaches' Poll

2007 Mid-South Conference football standings
	Conf.			Overall
Team	W		L	W		L
East Division
No. 14 Virginia–Wise x	4	–	1	10	–	2
No. 16 Cumberlands (KY) x^	4	–	1	8	–	3
No. 24 Georgetown (KY)	3	–	2	6	–	4
Pikeville	2	–	3	4	–	7
Union (KY)	2	–	3	4	–	7
West Virginia Tech	0	–	5	1	–	10
West Division
No. 5 Bethel (TN) x^	5	–	0	11	–	2
Shorter	3	–	2	7	–	4
Belhaven	3	–	2	5	–	6
Cumberland (TN)	2	–	3	3	–	7
Lambuth	2	–	3	3	–	8
Campbellsville	0	–	5	0	–	10
x – Division champion/co-champions; ^ – NAIA playoff participant; Rankings from NAIA Coaches' Poll

2008 Mid-South Conference football standings
	Conf.			Overall
Team	W		L	W		L
East Division
No. 6 Cumberlands (KY) x^	6	–	0	10	–	2
No. 10 Union (KY) ^	5	–	1	9	–	3
No. 19 Virginia–Wise	4	–	2	8	–	3
Georgetown (KY)	3	–	3	5	–	5
Campbellsville	2	–	4	3	–	8
Pikeville	1	–	5	2	–	9
West Virginia Tech	0	–	6	0	–	11
West Division
No. 11 Shorter x^	4	–	1	9	–	3
No. 15 Lambuth x^	4	–	1	8	–	4
Cumberland (TN) x	4	–	1	6	–	5
Belhaven	2	–	3	4	–	6
Bethel (TN)	1	–	4	2	–	9
Faulkner	0	–	5	2	–	9
x – Division champion/co-champions; ^ – NAIA playoff participant; Rankings from NAIA Coaches' Poll

2009 Mid-South Conference football standings
	Conf.			Overall
Team	W		L	W		L
East Division
No. 11 Cumberlands (KY) x^	5	–	1	9	–	2
Campbellsville	4	–	2	7	–	4
Georgetown (KY)	4	–	2	7	–	4
Virginia–Wise	4	–	2	5	–	6
Union (KY)	3	–	3	4	–	6
Pikeville	1	–	5	3	–	8
West Virginia Tech	0	–	6	3	–	8
West Division
No. 7 Lambuth x^	6	–	0	12	–	1
Belhaven	4	–	2	6	–	5
Bethel (TN)	4	–	2	5	–	6
Shorter	3	–	3	6	–	5
Cumberland (TN)	3	–	3	5	–	6
Kentucky Christian	1	–	5	1	–	9
Faulkner	0	–	6	2	–	9
x – Division champion/co-champions; ^ – NAIA playoff participant; Rankings from NAIA Coaches' Poll

2010 Mid-South Conference football standings
	Conf.			Overall
Team	W		L	W		L
East Division
No. 14 Georgetown (KY) x^	6	–	0	8	–	3
Campbellsville	5	–	1	7	–	5
Lindsey Wilson	4	–	2	5	–	6
Virginia–Wise	3	–	3	3	–	8
Pikeville	2	–	4	2	–	8
West Virginia Tech	1	–	5	2	–	9
Kentucky Christian	0	–	6	0	–	11
West Division
No. 19 Cumberlands (KY) x^	5	–	1	7	–	4
No. 23 Cumberland (TN)	4	–	2	8	–	3
Union (KY)	4	–	2	7	–	4
Bethel (TN)	3	–	3	5	–	5
Shorter	2	–	4	5	–	6
Faulkner	2	–	4	3	–	7
Belhaven	1	–	5	4	–	7
x – Division champion/co-champions; ^ – NAIA playoff participant; Rankings from NAIA Coaches' Poll

2011 Mid-South Conference football standings
	Conf.			Overall
Team	W		L	W		L
East Division
No. 4 Georgetown (KY) x^	5	–	0	12	–	1
Lindsey Wilson	3	–	2	7	–	3
Campbellsville	3	–	2	7	–	5
Kentucky Christian	2	–	3	4	–	7
Virginia–Wise	1	–	4	5	–	6
Pikeville	1	–	4	4	–	6
West Division
No. 14 Bethel (TN) x^	5	–	1	8	–	3
No. 25 Cumberland (TN)	4	–	2	7	–	3
No. 24 Cumberlands (KY)	4	–	2	7	–	3
Shorter	3	–	3	6	–	4
Belhaven	3	–	3	5	–	6
Faulkner	1	–	5	3	–	7
Union (KY)	1	–	5	2	–	9
x – Division champion/co-champions; ^ – NAIA playoff participant; Rankings from NAIA Coaches' Poll

2012 Mid-South Conference football standings
	Conf.			Overall
Team	W		L	W		L
East Division
No. 8 Georgetown (KY) x^	5	–	0	10	–	1
No. 7 Cumberlands (KY) ^	4	–	1	10	–	2
No. 25 Kentucky Christian	3	–	2	7	–	4
Union (KY)	1	–	4	4	–	7
Pikeville	1	–	4	3	–	8
Virginia–Wise	1	–	4	3	–	8
West Division
No. 9 Bethel (TN) x^	6	–	0	9	–	4
No. 19 Cumberland (TN)	4	–	2	8	–	3
Belhaven	4	–	2	6	–	5
Faulkner	4	–	2	6	–	5
Campbellsville	2	–	4	3	–	8
Lindsey Wilson	1	–	5	3	–	8
Bluefield	0	–	6	0	–	11
x – Division champion/co-champions; ^ – NAIA playoff participant; Rankings from NAIA Coaches' Poll

2013 Mid-South Conference football standings
	Conf.			Overall
Team	W		L	W		L
East Division
No. 2 Cumberlands (KY) x^	6	–	0	13	–	1
No. 12 Georgetown (KY) ^	5	–	1	7	–	4
No. 19 Lindsey Wilson	3	–	3	8	–	3
Pikeville	3	–	3	7	–	4
Kentucky Christian	2	–	4	3	–	8
Union (KY)	2	–	4	3	–	8
Bluefield	0	–	6	0	–	11
West Division
No. 10 Faulkner x^	4	–	1	9	–	3
Reinhardt x	4	–	1	6	–	4
No. 23 Cumberland (TN)	3	–	2	7	–	4
Campbellsville	3	–	2	4	–	6
Belhaven	1	–	4	3	–	8
Bethel (TN)	0	–	5	2	–	9
x – Division champion/co-champions; ^ – NAIA playoff participant; Rankings from NAIA Coaches' Poll

2014 Mid-South Conference football standings
	Conf.			Overall
Team	W		L	W		L
East Division
No. 7 Lindsey Wilson x^	6	–	0	10	–	3
No. 11 Georgetown (KY) ^	5	–	1	8	–	3
Pikeville	4	–	2	5	–	6
Kentucky Christian	2	–	4	5	–	6
Cumberlands (KY)	2	–	4	3	–	7
Bluefield	1	–	5	3	–	8
Union (KY)	1	–	5	1	–	9
West Division
No. 10 Faulkner x^	4	–	1	9	–	3
No. 14 Campbellsville x^	4	–	1	7	–	4
Reinhardt	3	–	2	6	–	4
Cumberland (TN)	2	–	3	6	–	5
Bethel (TN)	2	–	3	5	–	6
Belhaven	0	–	5	2	–	9
x – Division champion/co-champions; ^ – NAIA playoff participant; Rankings from NAIA Coaches' Poll

2015 Mid-South Conference football standings
	Conf.			Overall
Team	W		L	W		L
East Division
No. 25 Georgetown (KY) x	5	–	0	6	–	4
Cumberlands (KY)	4	–	1	7	–	3
Pikeville	3	–	2	4	–	7
Kentucky Christian	2	–	3	2	–	9
Union (KY)	1	–	4	1	–	9
Bluefield	0	–	5	1	–	10
West Division
No. 11 Campbellsville x^	5	–	0	8	–	3
No. 10 Reinhardt ^	4	–	1	9	–	2
No. 13 Lindsey Wilson ^	3	–	2	8	–	3
No. 23 Faulkner	2	–	3	7	–	3
Bethel (TN)	1	–	4	4	–	7
Cumberland (TN)	0	–	5	3	–	8
x – Division champion/co-champions; ^ – NAIA playoff participant; Rankings from NAIA Coaches' Poll

2016 Mid-South Conference football standings
	Conf.			Overall
Team	W		L	W		L
East Division
No. 25 Georgetown (KY) x	5	–	1	7	–	4
Pikeville x	5	–	1	6	–	5
Union (KY)	4	–	2	5	–	6
Cumberlands (KY)	3	–	3	4	–	6
Kentucky Christian	3	–	3	3	–	8
Bluefield	1	–	5	1	–	10
Cincinnati Christian	0	–	6	0	–	11
West Division
No. 3 Reinhardt x^	5	–	0	13	–	1
No. 8 Lindsey Wilson ^	4	–	1	11	–	2
Faulkner	3	–	2	6	–	4
Cumberland (TN)	2	–	3	5	–	6
Bethel (TN)	1	–	4	7	–	4
Campbellsville	0	–	5	2	–	8
x – Division champion/co-champions; ^ – NAIA playoff participant; Rankings from NAIA Coaches' Poll

2017 Mid-South Conference football standings
	Conf.			Overall
Team	W		L	W		L
Appalachian Division
No. 2 Reinhardt x^	6	–	0	12	–	1
Bluefield	4	–	2	6	–	5
Cumberlands (KY)	3	–	3	6	–	4
Union (KY)	3	–	3	5	–	5
Pikeville	3	–	3	5	–	6
Point	1	–	5	3	–	8
St. Andrews	1	–	5	2	–	8
Bluegrass Division
No. 5 Lindsey Wilson x^	6	–	0	11	–	1
No. 7 Georgetown (KY) ^	5	–	1	9	–	2
No. 20 Campbellsville	4	–	2	8	–	2
Cumberland (TN)	3	–	3	7	–	4
Bethel (TN)	2	–	4	3	–	7
Kentucky Christian	1	–	5	1	–	10
Cincinnati Christian	0	–	6	0	–	11
Sun Division
No. 10 Southeastern x^	5	–	0	8	–	2
No. 22 Faulkner	4	–	1	7	–	3
Webber International	3	–	2	5	–	4
Warner	2	–	3	4	–	6
Ave Maria	1	–	4	2	–	8
Edward Waters	0	–	5	0	–	10
x – Division champion/co-champions; ^ – NAIA playoff participant; Rankings from NAIA Coaches' Poll

2018 Mid-South Conference football standings
	Conf.			Overall
Team	W		L	W		L
Appalachian Division
No. 11 Reinhardt x^	6	–	0	9	–	2
No. 12 Cumberlands (KY) ^	5	–	1	10	–	2
Pikeville	4	–	2	6	–	5
Point	2	–	4	3	–	8
Bluefield	1	–	4	4	–	7
St. Andrews	1	–	4	2	–	7
Union (KY)	1	–	5	2	–	8
Bluegrass Division
No. 10 Bethel (TN) x^	6	–	0	10	–	1
No. 19 Georgetown (KY)	4	–	2	7	–	3
No. 18 Lindsey Wilson	4	–	2	7	–	3
Cumberland (TN)	3	–	3	5	–	6
Campbellsville	3	–	3	4	–	6
Kentucky Christian	1	–	5	2	–	9
Cincinnati Christian	0	–	6	0	–	11
Sun Division
No. 21 Southeastern x	5	–	1	7	–	3
Ave Maria x	5	–	1	6	–	4
Keiser	4	–	2	6	–	4
Webber International	3	–	3	7	–	3
Edward Waters	2	–	4	4	–	7
Faulkner	1	–	5	4	–	6
Warner	1	–	5	1	–	9
x – Division champion/co-champions; ^ – NAIA playoff participant; Rankings from NAIA Coaches' Poll

2019 Mid-South Conference football standings
	Conf.			Overall
Team	W		L	W		L
Appalachian Division
No. 13 Reinhardt x^	6	–	0	9	–	3
St. Andrews	5	–	1	5	–	5
Point	4	–	2	5	–	7
Bluefield	3	–	3	4	–	7
Kentucky Christian	2	–	4	3	–	8
Cincinnati Christian *	1	–	5	2	–	9
Union (KY)	0	–	6	0	–	11
Bluegrass Division
No. 4 Lindsey Wilson x^	7	–	0	12	–	1
No. 7 Cumberlands (KY) ^	6	–	1	10	–	2
Pikeville	4	–	3	6	–	5
Georgetown (KY)	4	–	3	5	–	5
Cumberland (TN)	3	–	4	5	–	5
Bethel (TN)	2	–	5	5	–	6
Thomas More	2	–	5	4	–	7
Campbellsville	0	–	7	1	–	9
Sun Division
No. 9 Keiser x^	6	–	0	9	–	1
No. 15 Southeastern	5	–	1	8	–	1
Ave Maria	3	–	3	5	–	5
St. Thomas (FL)	2	–	4	4	–	6
Webber International	2	–	4	3	–	6
Warner	2	–	4	3	–	7
Faulkner	1	–	5	3	–	6
x – Division champion/co-champions; ^ – NAIA playoff participant * – Cincinnati Christian announced its closure mid-season and forfeited its three remaining games.; Rankings from NAIA Coaches' Poll

2020 Mid-South Conference football standings
	Conf.			Overall
Team	W		L	W		L
Appalachian Division
No. 8 Reinhardt x^	6	–	0	9	–	1
Faulkner	5	–	1	6	–	2
Kentucky Christian	4	–	2	6	–	2
St. Andrews	2	–	3	3	–	3
Union (KY)	1	–	4	1	–	6
Bluefield	1	–	5	2	–	7
Point	1	–	5	1	–	7
Bluegrass Division
No. 1 Lindsey Wilson x^	7	–	0	11	–	0
No. 13 Georgetown (KY) ^	6	–	1	6	–	2
Cumberlands (KY)	4	–	3	4	–	3
Bethel (TN)	3	–	4	3	–	4
Pikeville	3	–	4	3	–	4
Cumberland (TN)	2	–	5	2	–	5
Thomas More	2	–	5	2	–	5
Campbellsville	1	–	6	1	–	6
Sun Division
No. 4 Keiser x^	5	–	0	9	–	1
Southeastern	3	–	1	5	–	1
St. Thomas (FL)	3	–	2	4	–	3
Ave Maria	2	–	3	3	–	4
Warner	1	–	3	2	–	4
Webber International	1	–	5	1	–	7
Florida Memorial	0	–	1	0	–	3
x – Division champion/co-champions; ^ – NAIA playoff participant; Rankings from NAIA Coaches' Poll

2021 Mid-South Conference football standings
	Conf.			Overall
Team	W		L	W		L
Appalachian Division
No. 6 Reinhardt x^	6	–	0	9	–	3
No. 24 Faulkner	5	–	1	8	–	2
Bluefield	4	–	2	6	–	5
Kentucky Christian	2	–	4	3	–	8
Point	2	–	4	2	–	8
St. Andrews	2	–	4	2	–	9
Union (KY)	0	–	6	1	–	9
Bluegrass Division
No. 1 Lindsey Wilson x^	7	–	0	12	–	1
No. 15 Georgetown (KY)	5	–	2	8	–	2
Bethel (TN)	4	–	3	7	–	4
Thomas More	4	–	3	5	–	5
Cumberlands (KY)	3	–	4	6	–	4
Pikeville	2	–	5	4	–	6
Cumberland (TN)	2	–	5	3	–	7
Campbellsville	1	–	6	1	–	8
Sun Division
No. 11 Keiser x^	5	–	1	9	–	3
Southeastern x	5	–	1	8	–	3
St. Thomas (FL)	4	–	2	9	–	2
Ave Maria	4	–	2	5	–	6
Warner	1	–	5	3	–	8
Webber International	1	–	5	2	–	8
Florida Memorial	1	–	5	2	–	9
x – Division champion/co-champions; ^ – NAIA playoff participant; Rankings from NAIA Coaches' Poll

2022 Mid-South Conference football standings
	Conf.			Overall
Team	W		L	W		L
No. 4 Bethel (TN) $^	8	–	0	11	–	1
No. 8 Lindsey Wilson ^	7	–	1	10	–	2
No. 21 Georgetown (KY)	5	–	3	7	–	3
Pikeville	5	–	3	6	–	4
Thomas More	4	–	4	5	–	6
Cumberlands (KY)	3	–	5	5	–	5
Faulkner	3	–	5	4	–	7
Cumberland (TN)	1	–	7	3	–	7
Campbellsville	0	–	8	2	–	8
$ – Conference champion; ^ – NAIA playoff participant; Rankings from NAIA Coaches' Poll
