= 2020–21 NAIA football national championship =

2020 NAIA Football National Championship
Northwestern Red Raiders	Lindsey Wilson Blue Raiders
(11–1)	(10–0)
GPAC	MSC (Bluegrass)
13	45
Head coach: Matt McCarty	Head coach: Chris Oliver
Seed 6	Seed 3
	1	2	3	4	Total
Northwestern	0	7	6	0	13
Lindsey Wilson	7	10	14	14	45
- Date: May 10 (Note: Game was played on May 10, 2021, due to COVID-19.), 2020
- Season: 2020–21
- Stadium: Eddie Robinson Stadium
- Location: Grambling, Louisiana
- MVP: Cameron Dukes (QB, Lindsey Wilson) (Offensive); Michael Leslie (DB, Lindsey Wilson) (Defensive)
- Referee: Craig Demaree
- Attendance: 1,241

The 2020–21 NAIA football national championship was a four-round, sixteen team tournament played between April 17 and May 10, 2021. The tournament concluded with a single game, played as the 65th Annual NAIA Football National Championship.

The championship game was played at Eddie Robinson Stadium in Grambling, Louisiana, between the 11–1 No. 6 Northwestern Red Raiders, representing Northwestern College from Orange City, Iowa, and the undefeated No. 3 Lindsey Wilson Blue Raiders, representing Lindsey Wilson College from Columbia, Kentucky. This was the second time the championship game was played at this venue with the previous year's game also taking place there. The game was played on May 10, 2021, with kickoff at 6:00 p.m. EST (5:00 p.m. local CST).

== Teams ==
=== Northwestern (IA) ===
The Northwestern Red Raiders, led by 5th-year head coach Matt McCarty, entered the national championship game as the No. 6 seed. They were seeking to win their third national championship overall and first non-NAIA Division II national championship, having won in 1973 and 1983. They entered the game 11–1, 8–1 in GPAC play.

2020 Northwestern (IA) Football
Sep. 12	at No. 1 Morningside*	L 31–45
Sep. 19	Dakota Wesleyan*	W 50–16
Sep. 3	at No. 18 Dordt*	W 49–7
Oct. 17	Concordia (NE)*	W 31–17
Oct. 24	at Doane*	W 35–14
Oct. 31	Midland*	W 43–14
Nov. 7	at Hastins*	W 62–10
Nov. 14	Briar Cliff*	W 38–21
Nov. 23	Jamestown*	W 49–0
NAIA Playoffs (No. 6 seed)
Apr. 17	No. 10 Dickinson State	W 31–7
Apr. 24	at No. 2 Grand View	W 27–24
May 10	at No. 1 Morningside	W 44–41

=== Lindsey Wilson ===
The Lindsey Wilson Blue Raiders, led by 11th-year head coach Chris Oliver, entered the national championship game as the No. 3 seed and were looking to win the program's first-ever NAIA National Championship. They entered the game 10–0, 7–0 in MSC Bluegrass Division play.

2020 Lindsey Wilson Football
Feb. 12	Pikeville*	W 49–0
Feb. 26	No. 17 Cumberlands (KY)*	W 45–10
Mar. 5	at No. 19 Georgetown (KY)*	W 35–14
Mar. 12	at Cumberland (TN)*	W 56–22
Mar. 19	Thomas More*	W 52–20
Apr. 1	at Campbellsville*	W 49–21
Apr. 9	Bethel (TN)*	W 49–7
NAIA Playoffs (No. 3 seed)
Apr. 17	No. 14 Bethel (KS)	W 42–10
Apr. 24	No. 5 Concordia (MI)	W 49–27
May 1	No. 4 Keiser	W 38–14

=== Series history ===
This game was both teams' first time playing each other.

== Game summary ==
2020 NAIA Football National Championship Game

Quarter	1	2	3	4	Total
No. 6 Northwestern (IA)	0	7	6	0	13
No. 3 Lindsey Wilson	7	10	14	14	45

at Eddie Robinson Stadium • Grambling, Louisiana

- Date: Saturday, May 10, 2023
- Game time: 6:00 p.m. EST (5:00 p.m. CST)
- Game weather: • Temperature: 63 °F (17 °C) • Wind: Calm
- Game attendance: 1,241
- Referee: Craig Demaree

Game information

First Quarter

- (4:48) LWC – Cameron Dukes 1-yard run, Ian Sauter kick (Drive: 13 plays, 75 yards, 5:38; Lindsey Wilson 7–0)

Second Quarter

- (12:21) LWC – Ian Sauter 33-yard kick (Drive: 4 plays, 2 yards, 1:48; Lindsey Wilson 10–0)
- (7:13) LWC – Noel Patterson 41-yard run, Ian Sauter kick (Drive: 7 plays, 73 yards, 3:11; Lindsey Wilson 17–0)
- (0:11) NWC – Blake Fryar 1-yard pass to Konner McQuillan, Eli Sader kick (Drive: 17 plays, 75 yards, 7:02; Lindsey Wilson 17–7)

Third Quarter

- (11:26) LWC – Cameron Dukes 2-yard run, Eli Sader kick (Drive: 8 plays, 61 yards, 3:34; Lindsey Wilson 24–7)
- (8:20) LWC – Kobe Belcher 1-yard run, Eli Sader kick (Drive: 3 plays, 47 yards, 0:39; Lindsey Wilson 31–7)
- (0:38) NWC – Blake Fryar 11-yard pass to Shane Solberg, Michael Storey 2-point pass failed (Drive: 11 plays, 99 yards, 5:03; Lindsey Wilson 31–13)

Fourth Quarter

- (7:53) LWC – Cameron Dukes 3-yard run, Ian Sauter kick (Drive: 14 plays, 45 yards, 7:45; Lindsey Wilson 38–13)
- (4:09) LWC – Cameron Evans 6-yard run, Ian Sauter kick (Drive: 3 plays, 15 yards, 1:36; Lindsey Wilson 45–13)

=== Statistics ===
Statistics	NWC	LWC
First downs	16	17
Total yards	231	347
Rushes–yards	32–74	40–190
Passing yards	157	157
Passing: Comp–Att–Int	22–32–0	18–24–0
Time of possession	28:50	31:10

Team	Category	Player	Statistics
Northwestern (IA)	Passing	Blake Fryar	22/32, 157 yards, 2 TD
Northwestern (IA)	Rushing	Blake Fryar	18 carries, 38 yards
Northwestern (IA)	Receiving	Cade Moser	6 receptions, 54 yards
Lindsey Wilson	Passing	Cameron Dukes	18/24, 157 yards
Lindsey Wilson	Rushing	Darius Clark	4 carries, 70 yards
Lindsey Wilson	Receiving	Jaylen Boyd	4 receptions, 50 yards

== Postseason playoffs ==
A total of sixteen teams were selected to participate in the single-elimination tournament from across the country, with invitations that were revealed on Sunday, November 17, 2019. The field included twelve conference champions who received automatic bids. The field was then filled with at-large selections that were awarded to the highest ranked teams that were not conference champions. First-round seedings were based on the final regular-season edition of the 2020 NAIA Coaches' Poll, with certain minor modifications given based on travel and geographic considerations. Each subsequent round also saw minor modifications based on travel and the geography of the remaining teams.

Quarterfinal pairings were announced by the NAIA on November 23, after the first round results were known.

Semifinal pairings were announced by the NAIA on November 30, soon after completion of the day's quarterfinal games.

1st Round; April 17, 2021
3	Lindsey Wilson	42
14	Bethel (KS)	10
5	Concordia (MI)	21
12	Georgetown	7
4	Keiser	63
15	Arizona Christian	21
8	Reinhardt	40
9	Marian (IN)	29
1	Morningside	55
16	Carroll	0
7	Baker	59
10	Olivet Nazarene	54
2	Grand View	38
13	Dordt	10
6	Northwestern (IA)	31
11	Dickinson State	7

Quarterfinals; April 24, 2021
3	Lindsey Wilson	49
5	Concordia (MI)	27
4	Keiser	42
8	Reinhardt	14
1	Morningside	45
7	Baker	29
2	Grand View	24
6	Northwestern (IA)	27

Semifinals; May 1, 2021
3	Lindsey Wilson	38
4	Keiser	14
1	Morningside	41
6	Northwestern (IA)	44

Championship; May 10, 2021
3	Lindsey Wilson	45
6	Northwestern (IA)	13
