= List of Football Academic All-America Team Members of the Year =

Student athlete award

Football Academic All-America Team Members of the Year
- Awarded for: the yearly outstanding men's American football Academic All-America team member
- Country: United States & Canada
- Presented by: College Sports Communicators

History
- Most recent: Blake Horvath, Navy; Jack Strand, Minnesota State Moorhead; Robby Ballentine, DePauw; Zach Myers, Evangel
- Next ceremony: January 2027
- Website: academicallamerica.com

The annually-awarded Football Academic All-America Team Member of the Year is the most outstanding singular college football athlete selected for the Academic All-America Teams in a given year. Selected by the College Sports Communicators (formerly known as College Sports Information Directors of America, or CoSIDA), the Academic All-America program recognizes combined athletic performance and academic achievement excellence of the nation's top student-athletes.

Formerly, an Academic All-District team of honorees based on CSC member nominations and voting was chosen in each of eight geographic districts across the United States and Canada. Academic All-District and All-America teams were chosen separately for various levels of collegiate athletic competition (known as divisions). For each division, a set of eight districts was delineated. For the NCAA Division I-level teams for the seasons up to the 2021–22 academic year, districts were as follows: – District 1 (CT, MA, ME, NH, NY, RI, VT), District 2 (DC, DE, KY, MD, NJ, PA, WV), District 3 (NC, TN, VA), District 4 (AL, FL, GA, PR, SC), District 5 (IL, IN, MI, OH), District 6 (AR, IA, LA, MN, MO, MS, MT, ND, SD, WI, WY), – District 7 (CO, ID, KS, NE, NM, NV, OK, TX), District 8 (AK, AZ, CA, HI, OR, UT, WA, Canada). Other divisions use other district groupings. Formerly, only first team All-District honorees made the All-America team ballots. In 2022, the All-District selection process was eliminated, with all eligible nominees being included on the Academic All-America final ballot. In addition, tennis and swimming & diving were added as separate sports from the at-large set of sports. Also, the qualifying grade point average was raised from 3.3 to 3.5.

From 1996 to 2010, this team selection process was held separately for the College and University Divisions. The University Division Academic All-America and Academic All-District teams included eligible participants from National Collegiate Athletic Association (NCAA) Division I member schools, while the College Division team included scholar-athletes from all of the following: NCAA Division II, NCAA Division III, National Association of Intercollegiate Athletics (NAIA), Canadian universities and colleges and two-year colleges. From each team one winner for each sport was chosen from both the College and University Divisions for all twelve Academic All-America teams including football to be the team member of the year. Thus, all twelve Academic All-American teams (men's and women's basketball, men's and women's soccer, men's and women's track & field/cross country, men's baseball, women's softball, men's football, women's volleyball, men's and women's swimming & diving, men's and women's tennis and all remaining sanctioned men's and women's sports as at-large teams) had one Academic All-American of the Year per division. One of these twelve sport-by-sport Academic All-Americans of the year is selected as the Academic All-America Team Member of the Year for each division. The most recent football player to win the all-sports honor is Brayden Long of Slippery Rock University, who received the Division II award for the 2024–25 academic year. (Note: Football awards are normally presented in the fall and overall awards in spring. The only exception to date was in 2020–21, when COVID-19 disruptions caused the announcement of the football awards to be delayed until summer 2021.)

In 2011, the Academic All-America program was expanded from two to four divisions. NCAA Divisions II and III were separated into their own divisions, while the College Division was then restricted to non-NCAA institutions. Most recently, effective with the 2018–19 school year, the College Division was split, with NAIA members now receiving their own set of awards, while in some sports two-year college, Canadian institutions and any other institution not affiliated with the NCAA or NAIA also get a set of rewards under the College Division. However, the football selection process has incorporated Canada into the districts for the other four sets.

== History ==
Two-time Winners

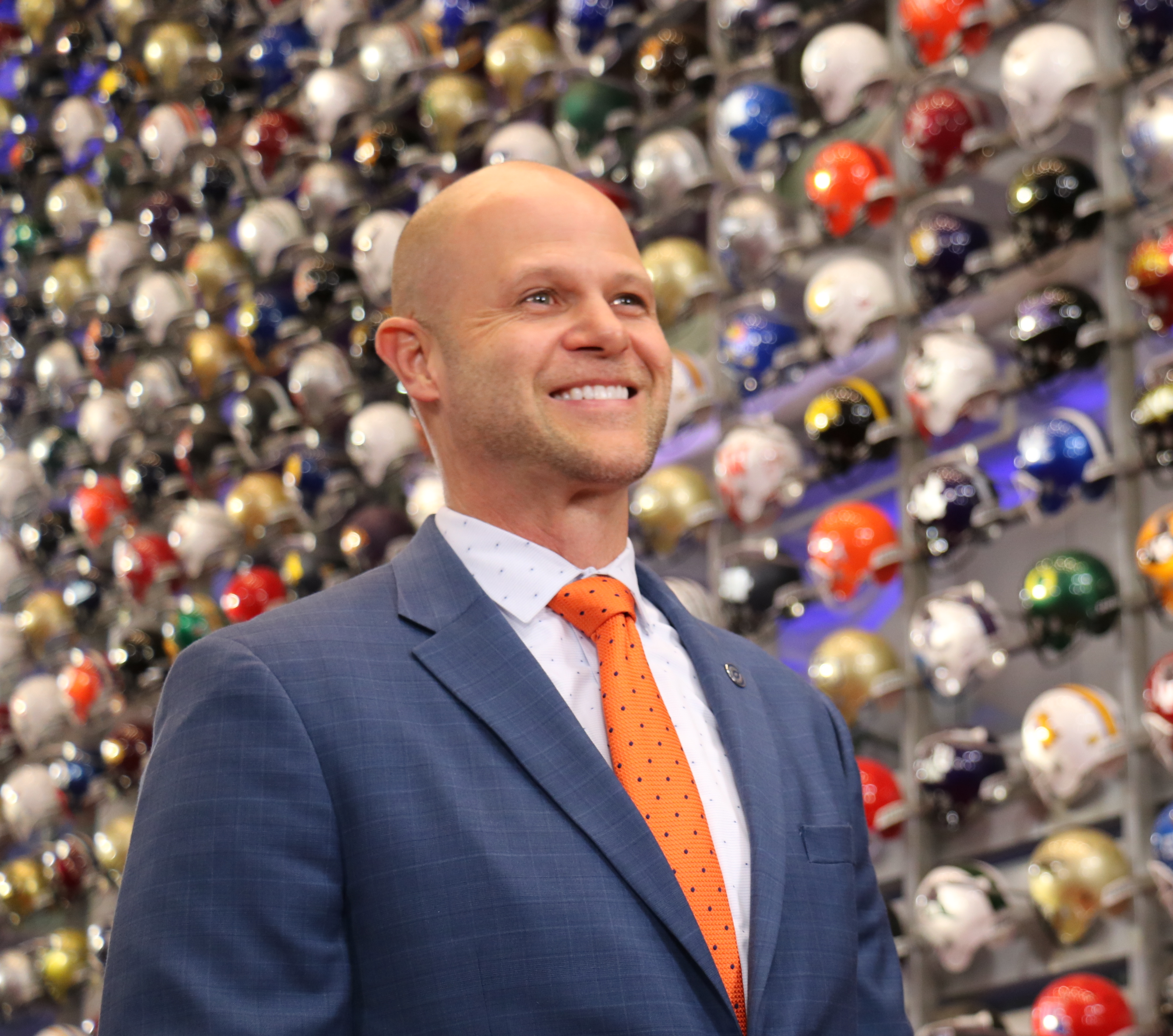
Danny Wuerffel in 2019
1995 and 1996 winner

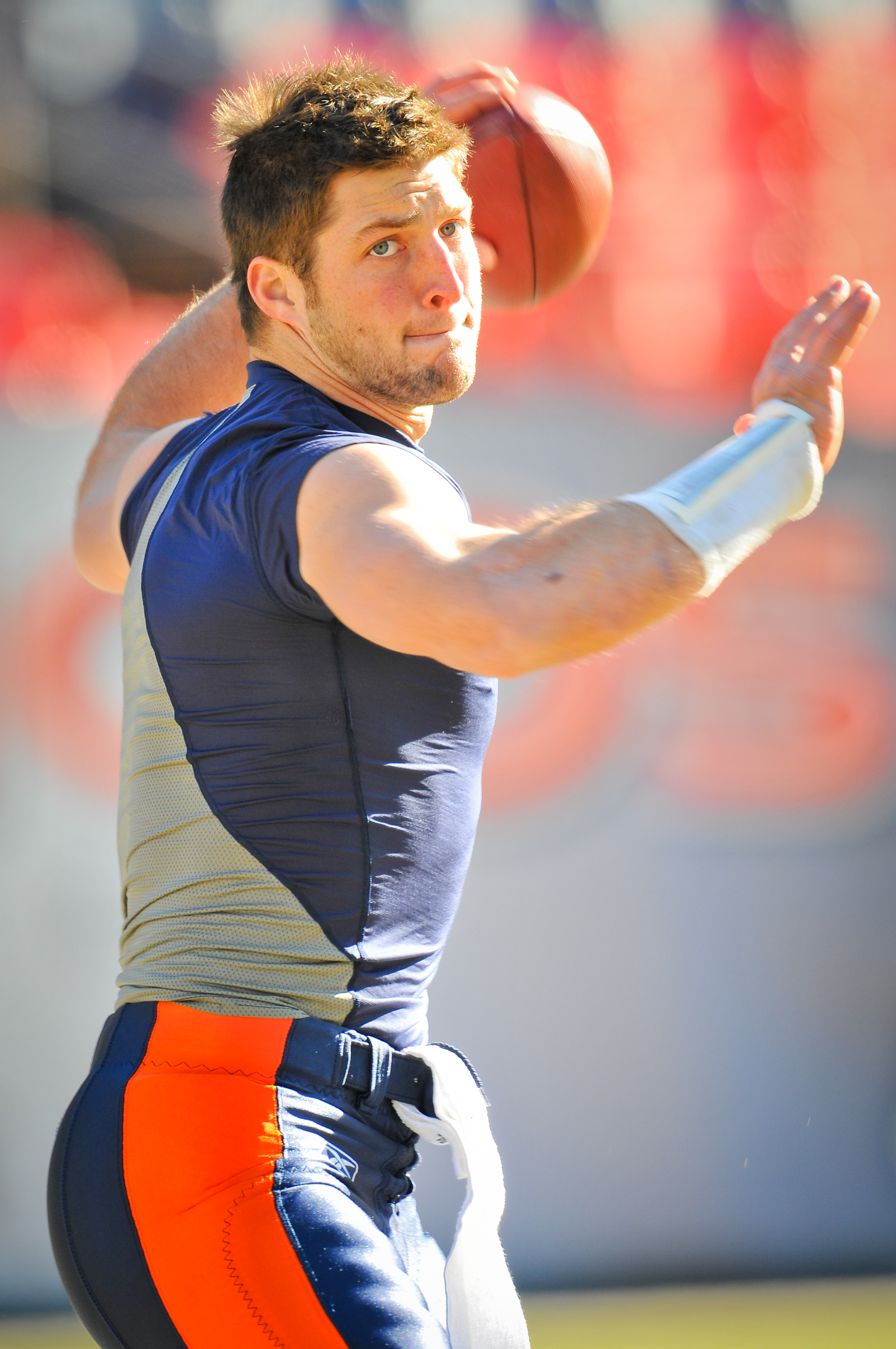
Tim Tebow in 2012
2008 and 2009 winner

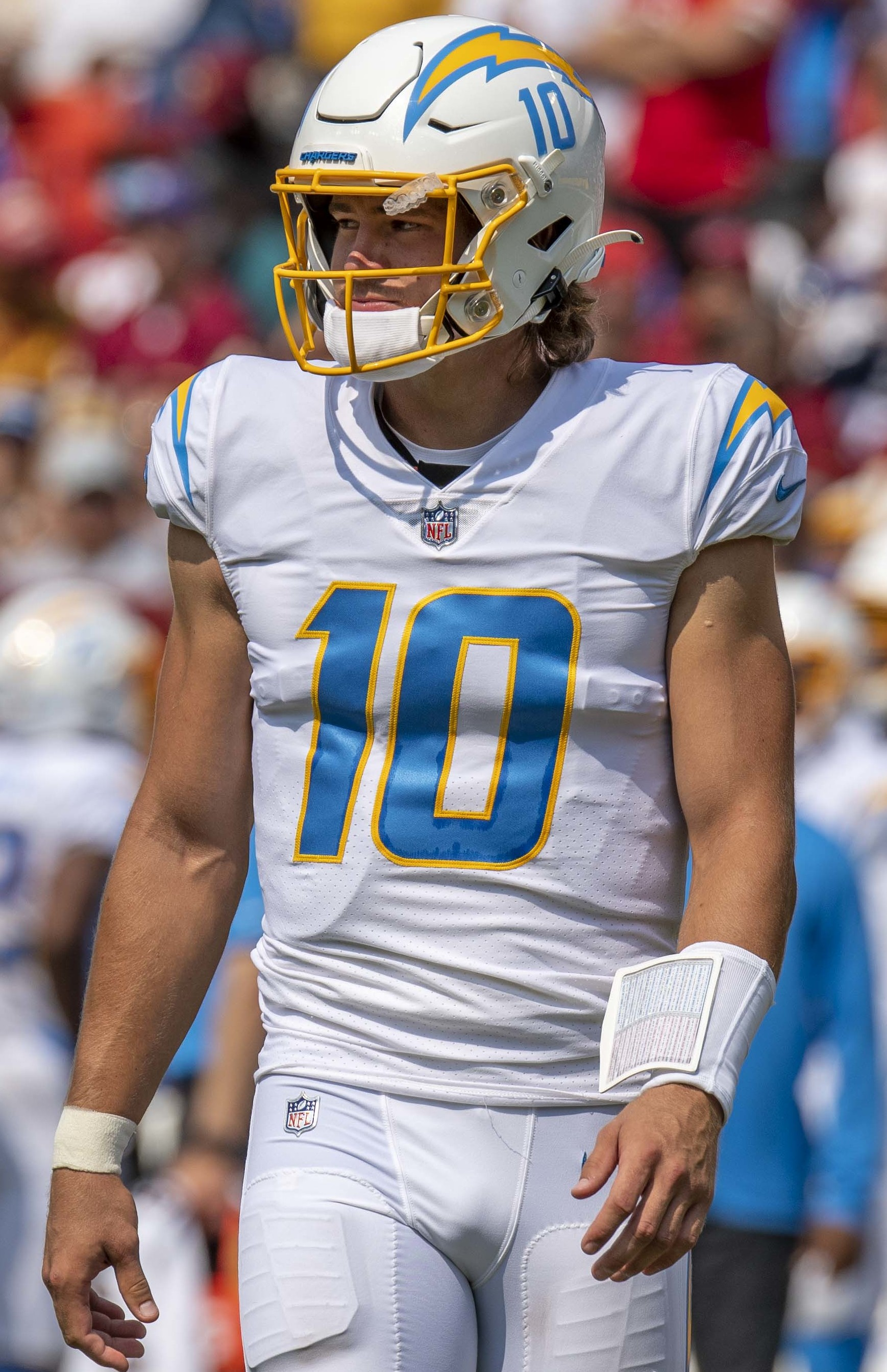
Justin Herbert in 2021
2018 and 2019 winner

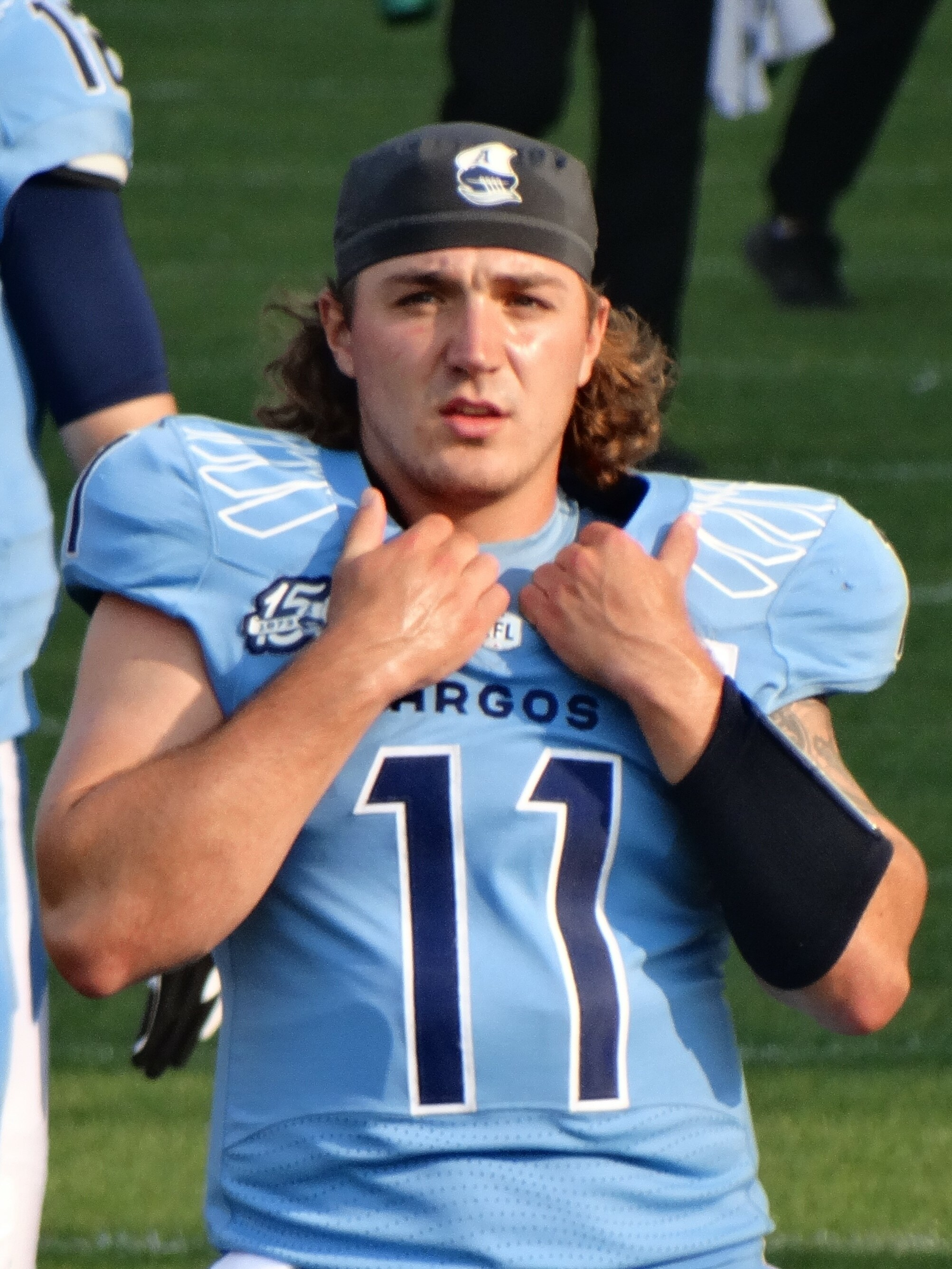
Cameron Dukes in 2023
2020–21 and 2021 winner

Although Nebraska Cornhuskers football has the most Football Academic All-America selections, only Rob Zatechka has earned this award for Nebraska.

Several of the Football Academic All-America of the Year winners have gone on to win the overall Academic All-America of the Year. For Division I, Tommy Vardell (1991), Jim Hansen (1992), Rob Zatechka (1994), Danny Wuerffel (1996), Peyton Manning (1997), Matt Stinchcomb (1998), Chad Pennington (1999), Alex Smith (2004), Barrett Jones (2012), Carson Wentz (2015), Justin Herbert (2019), and Mac Jones (2020–21) all earned the overall award. Before the split, College Division selectees Chris Palmer (1995), T.J. Hess (2001), Josh Lamberson (2005) and Greg Micheli (2008) were overall winners. Since the split, Division II honorees Jason Vander Laan (2015), John Matocha (2022), and Brayden Long (2024), as well as Division III winner Owen Grover (2023), have won the overall award. No NAIA honoree has won the all-sports award since the split.

Several have been repeat winners of this award.Justin Herbert is the most recent repeat Division I winner. He was preceded by Tim Tebow and Danny Wuerffel. Before the College Division was divided, its repeat winners included David Gubbrud, Chris Hatcher and Corte McGuffey. Since the split, Ugdam Goya has repeated in Division III and Jake Snodgrass and Cameron Dukes have repeated in the NAIA.

== Tables of winners ==
Overall Team Members of the Year

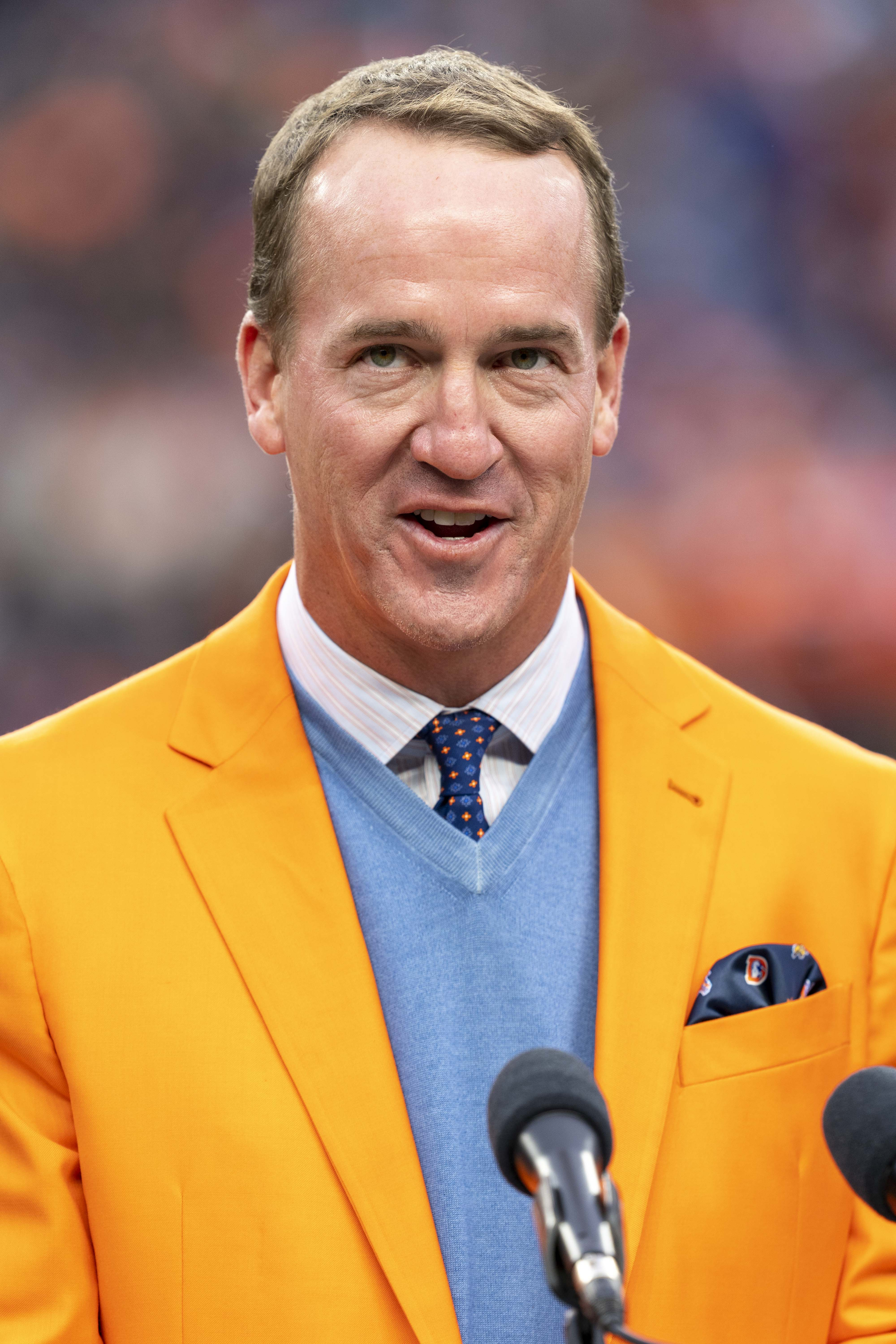
Peyton Manning in 2021
1997 winner

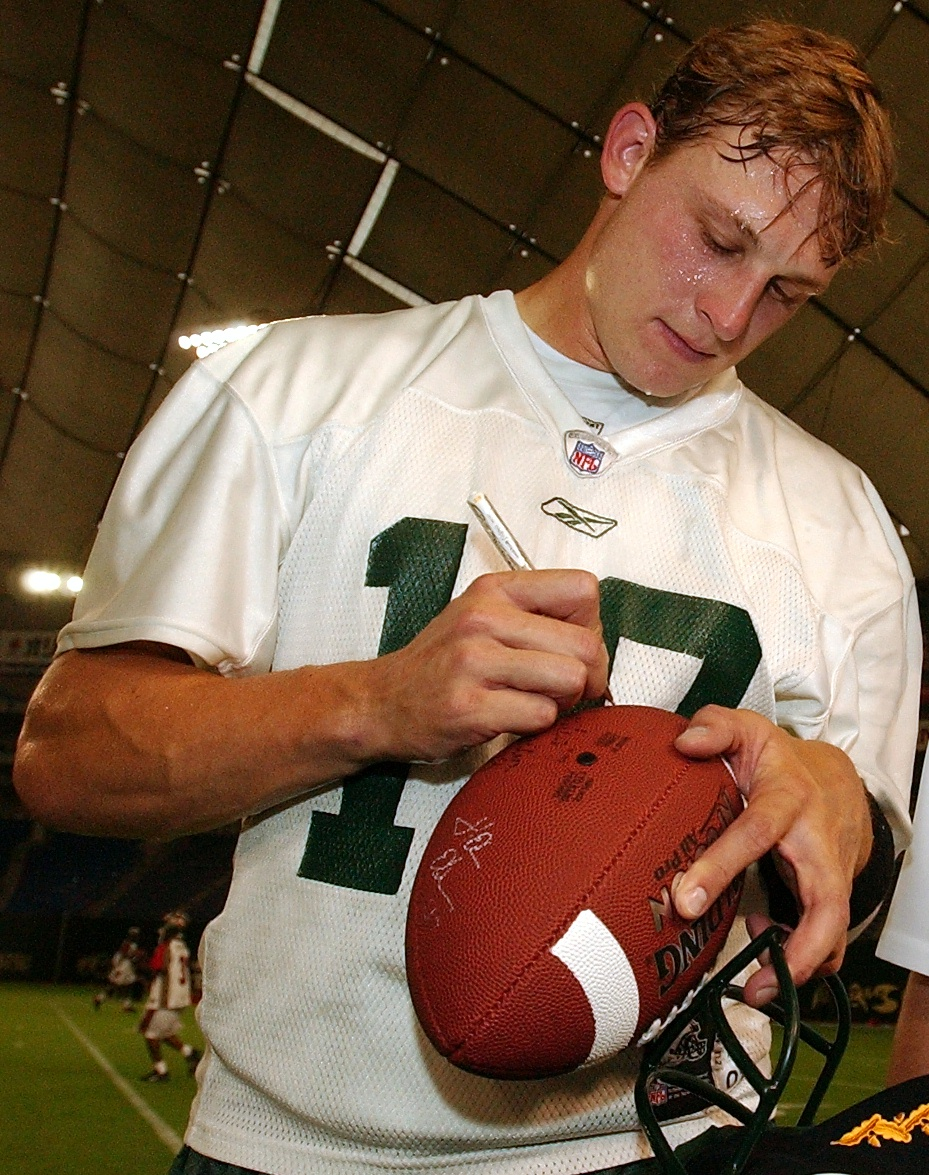
Chad Pennington in 2003
1999 winner

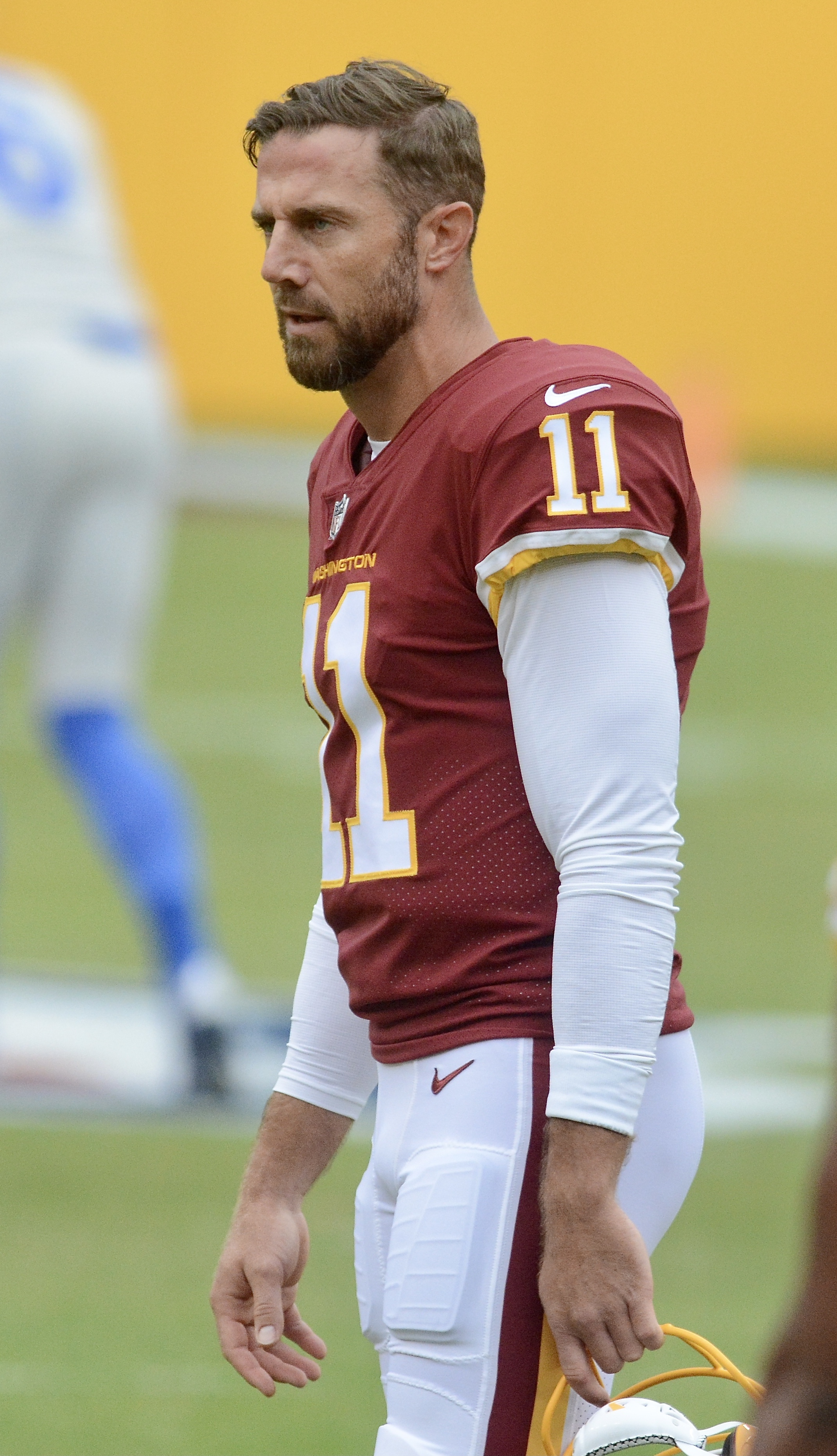
Alex Smith in 2020
2004 winner

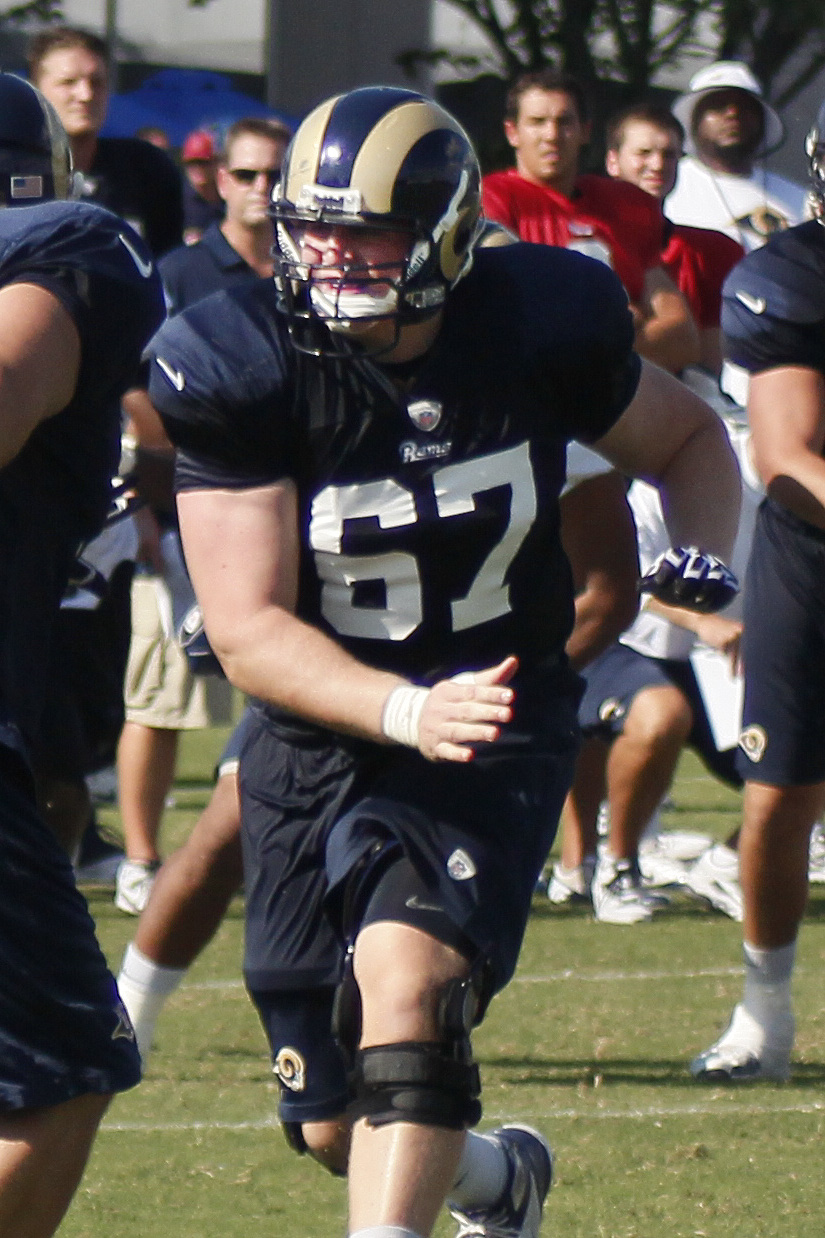
Barrett Jones in 2013
2012 winner

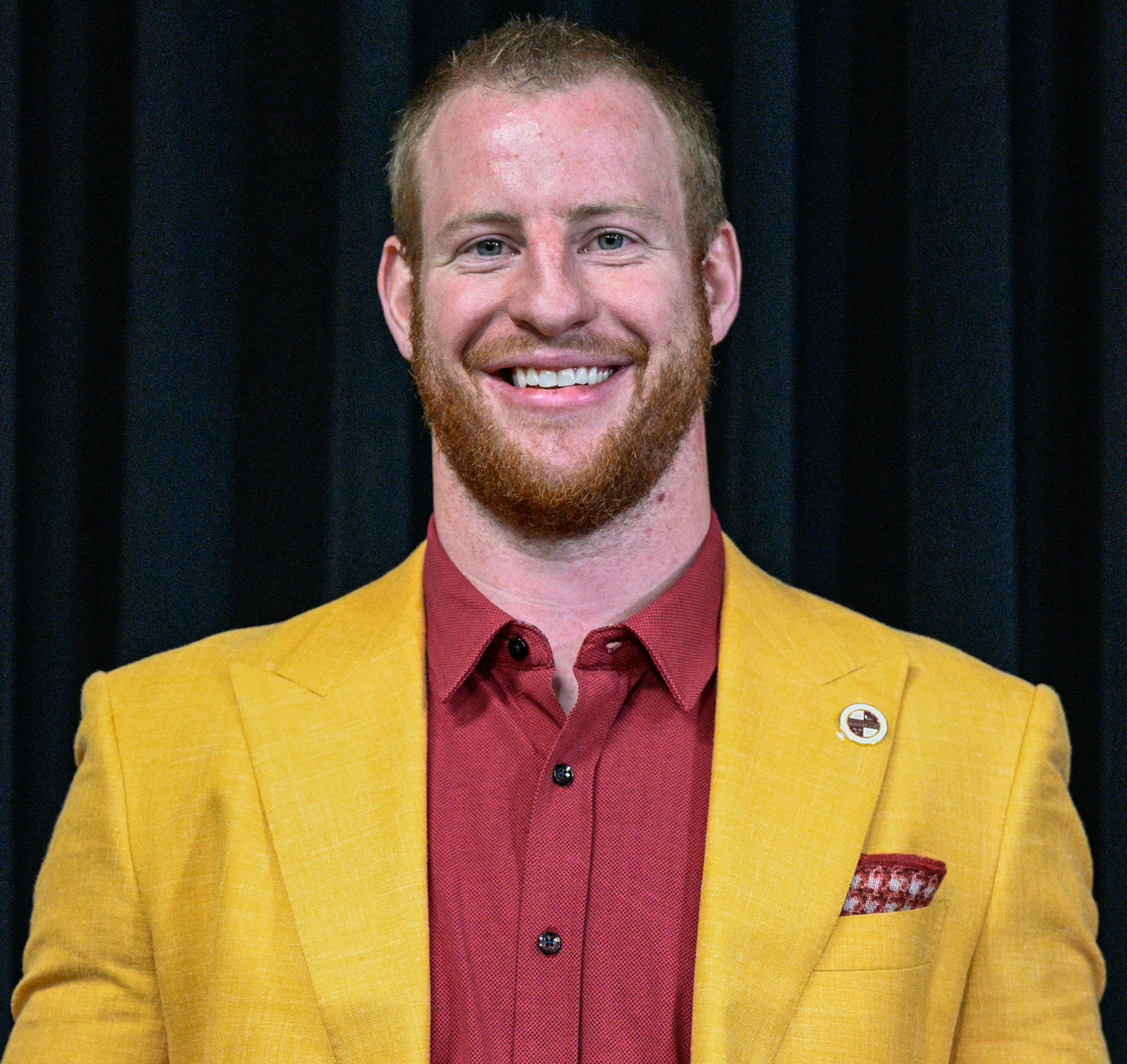
Carson Wentz in 2022
2015 winner

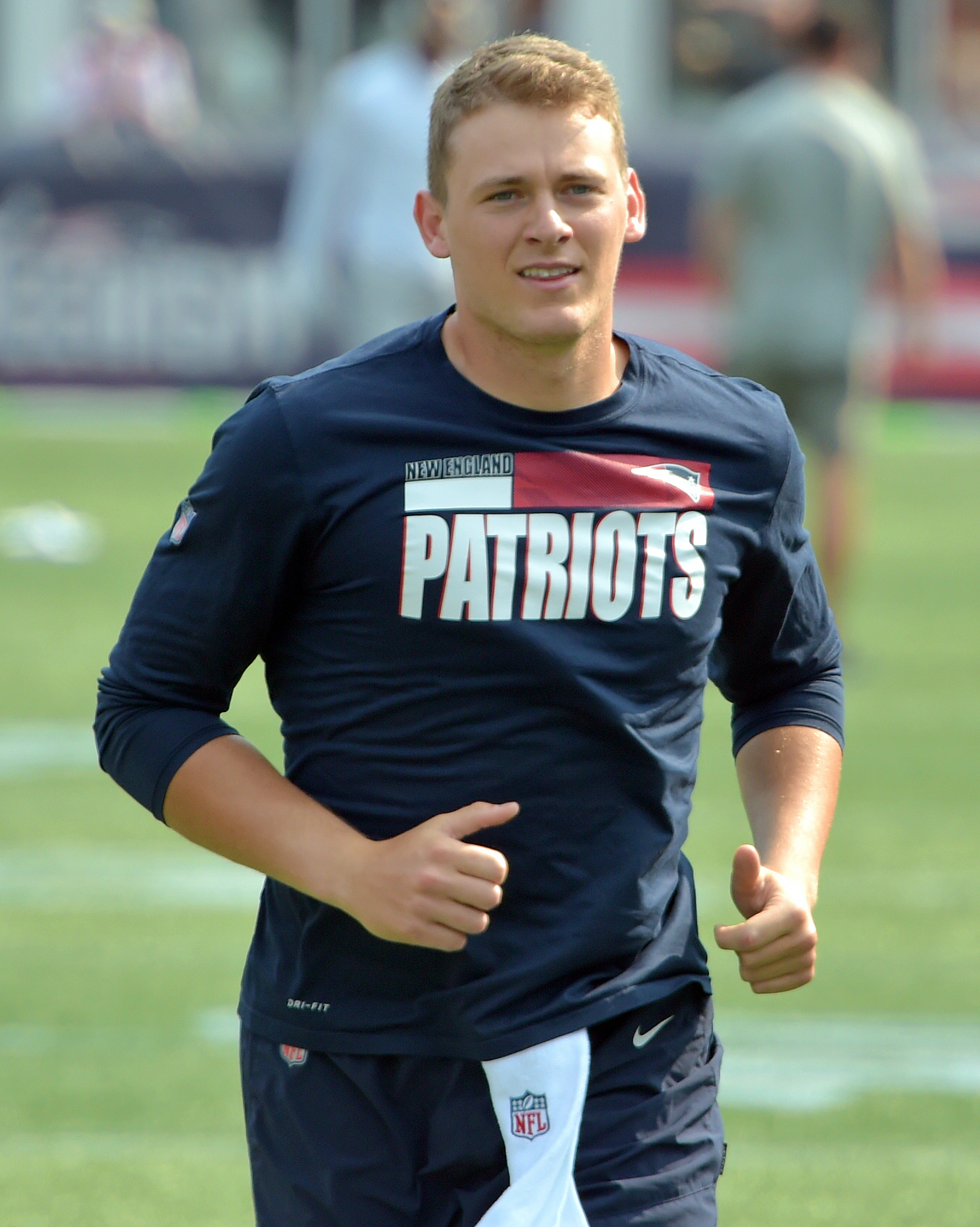
Mac Jones in 2021
2020–21 winner

Key
†	Indicates winners of the all-sports Academic All-America award.

=== Two-division era (1987–2010) ===
Football Academic All-America Team Members of the Year (1987–2010)
Year	University Division		College Division	
Year	Winner	School	Winner	School
1987	Kip Corrington	Texas A&M	Grant Jones	Denison
1988	Paul Sorenson	Dartmouth	David Gubbrud	Augustana (SD)
1989	Michael Thorson	Army	David Gubbrud	Augustana (SD)
1990	Bill Musgrave	Oregon	Robert O'Toole	Carnegie Mellon
1991	Tommy Vardell†	Stanford	Karl Kuhn	Arkansas Tech
1992	Jim Hansen†	Colorado	Roderick Tranum	MIT
1993	Tim Ruddy	Notre Dame	Chris Hatcher	Valdosta State
1994	Rob Zatechka†	Nebraska	Chris Hatcher	Valdosta State
1995	Danny Wuerffel	Florida	Chris Palmer†	Saint John's (MN)
1996	Danny Wuerffel†	Florida	Lon Erickson	Illinois Wesleyan
1997	Peyton Manning†	Tennessee	Brad Gray	MIT
1998	Matt Stinchcomb†	Georgia	Corte McGuffey	Northern Colorado
1999	Chad Pennington†	Marshall	Corte McGuffey	Northern Colorado
2000	Drew Brees	Purdue	Dave Wonderlick	Susquehanna
2001	Ryan Johnson	Montana State	T.J. Hess†	Widener
2002	Kliff Kingsbury	Texas Tech	Mike Bowman	Susquehanna
2003	Craig Krenzel	Ohio State	Tyler Paul	Emporia State
2004	Alex Smith†	Utah	Ty Touchstone	Eastern New Mexico
2005	Nick Hartigan	Brown	Josh Lamberson †	Northwest Missouri State
2006	Paul Posluszny	Penn State	Ryan Meredith	Pittsburg State
2007	Brandon Cramer	Dayton	Danny Woodhead	Chadron State
2008	Tim Tebow	Florida	Greg Micheli†	Mount Union
2009	Tim Tebow	Florida	Beau Kildow	Morningside
2010	Greg McElroy	Alabama	Isaac Odim	Minnesota–Duluth

=== Four-division era (2011–present) ===
Football Academic All-America Team Members of the Year (2011–present)
Year	Division I		Division II		Division III		College/NAIA (Note: College Division, 2011–2017; NAIA, 2018–present)	
Year	Winner	School	Winner	School	Winner	School	Winner	School
2011	Andrew Luck	Stanford	Clay Garcia	Colorado Mines	Michael Zweifel	Dubuque	Jake Snodgrass	McPherson
2012	Barrett Jones†	Alabama	Dustin Vaughan	West Texas A&M	Nick Driskill	Mount Union	Jake Snodgrass	McPherson
2013	Gabe Ikard	Oklahoma	Trent Adams	Northwest Missouri State	John Arena	Johns Hopkins	Lamont Wims	Robert Morris (IL)
2014	Zach Zenner	South Dakota State	Kevin Rodgers	Henderson State	Michael Bates	Illinois College	Connor Zumpfe	Nebraska Wesleyan
2015	Carson Wentz†	North Dakota State	Jason Vander Laan†	Ferris State	Hank Spencer	Mount Union	Logan Paben	Peru State
2016	Christian McCaffrey	Stanford	Kyle Zimmerman	Northwest Missouri State	Ryan Anderson	Olivet	Logan Brettell	Baker
2017	Marlon Walls	Stephen F. Austin	Ty Reasnor	Arkansas Tech	Ugdam Goyal	MIT	Gunnar Orcutt	Peru State
2018	Justin Herbert	Oregon	Kirby Hora	Augustana (SD)	Ugdam Goyal	MIT	Trent Solsma	Morningside
2019	Justin Herbert†	Oregon	Brant Grisel	Charleston (WV)	Matt Anderson	UW–Whitewater	Hilton Joseph	Waldorf
2020–21 (Note: Officially designated as "2020–21" awards; Division I FBS played in fall 2020, while most teams at other levels either did not play at all or played in spring 2021.)	Mac Jones†	Alabama	Evan Ernst	Ohio Dominican	Steven Sellers	Mary Hardin–Baylor	Cameron Dukes	Lindsey Wilson
2021	Charlie Kolar	Iowa State	Henry Litwin	Slippery Rock	Matt Anderson	Grove City	Cameron Dukes	Lindsey Wilson
2022	Will Levis	Kentucky	John Matocha†	Colorado Mines	Cormac Madigan	Ripon	Ryan Cole	Morningside
2023	Rome Odunze	Washington	Nolan Reeve	Colorado Mines	Owen Grover†	Wartburg	Jaden Meizinger	Keiser
2024	Travis Hunter	Colorado	Brayden Long†	Slippery Rock	Aaron Syverson	Saint John's (MN)	Jameson Chesser	Taylor
2025	Blake Horvath	Navy	Jack Strand	Minnesota State–Moorhead	Robby Ballentine	DePauw	Zach Myers	Evangel

== Schools with multiple awards ==
School	Awards
Florida	4 (Note: Four awards won by two individuals)
MIT	4 (Note: Four awards won by three individuals)
Alabama	3
Colorado Mines	3
Augustana (SD)	3 (Note: Three awards won by two individuals)
Morningside	3
Mount Union	3
Northwest Missouri State	3
Stanford	3
Arkansas Tech	2
Colorado	2
Lindsey Wilson	2 (Note: Two awards won by the same individual)
McPherson	2
Oregon	3
Peru State	2
Saint John's (MN)	2
Slippery Rock	2
Susquehanna	2
Valdosta State	2
