= Chris Oliver (American football) =

American football player and coach

Coaching career (HC unless noted)
- 2001–2002: Ohio State (SA)
- 2003–2005: Ohio Dominican (OL)
- 2006–2008: Ohio Dominican (OC)
- 2009–2021: Lindsey Wilson
- 2022–2024: Georgetown (KY)

Head coaching record
- Overall: 131–42
- Tournaments: 14–8 (NAIA playoffs)

Accomplishments and honors

Championships
- 1 NAIA (2020); 1 MSC East Division (2014); 4 MSC Bluegrass Division (2017, 2019–2021); 2 MSC (2023–2024)

Awards
- NAIA AFCA Coach of the Year Award (2020)

Chris Oliver is an American college football coach. He was the head football coach for Georgetown College from 2022 to 2024. Oliver was the head football coach at Lindsey Wilson College in Columbia, Kentucky from the inception of the school's football program, which began play in 2010, through the 2021 season. Oliver led the Lindsey Wilson Blue Raiders to the NAIA Football National Championship in the spring of 2021.

== Head coaching record ==
Year	Team	Overall	Conference	Standing	Bowl/playoffs	NAIA^{#}
Lindsey Wilson Blue Raiders (Mid-South Conference) (2010–2021)
2010	Lindsey Wilson	5–6	4–2	3rd (East)		
2011	Lindsey Wilson	7–3	3–2	T–2nd (East)		
2012	Lindsey Wilson	3–8	1–5	6th (West)		
2013	Lindsey Wilson	8–3	3–3	T–3rd (East)		19
2014	Lindsey Wilson	10–3	6–0	1st (East)	L NAIA Quarterfinal	7
2015	Lindsey Wilson	8–3	3–2	3rd (West)	L NAIA First Round	13
2016	Lindsey Wilson	11–2	4–1	2nd (West)	L NAIA Quarterfinal	8
2017	Lindsey Wilson	11–1	6–0	1st (Bluegrass)	L NAIA Quarterfinal	5
2018	Lindsey Wilson	7–3	4–2	T–2nd (Bluegrass)		18
2019	Lindsey Wilson	12–1	7–0	1st (Bluegrass)	L NAIA Semifinal	4
2020	Lindsey Wilson	11–0	7–0	1st (Bluegrass)	W NAIA Championship	1
2021	Lindsey Wilson	12–1	7–0	1st (Bluegrass)	L NAIA Semifinal	
Lindsey Wilson:		105–34	55–17			
Georgetown Tigers (Mid-South Conference) (2022–present)
2022	Georgetown	7–3	5–3	3rd		
2023	Georgetown	10–2	6–0	1st	L NAIA Semifinal	4
2024	Georgetown	9–3	6–0	1st	L NAIA Quarterfinal	11
Georgetown:		26–8	14–3			
Total:		131–42				
National championship Conference title Conference division title or championship game berth
^{#}Rankings from final NAIA Coaches' Poll.
