= 2020 college football season =

2020 college football season may refer to:

== American leagues ==
- 2020 NCAA Division I FBS football season
- 2020–21 NCAA Division I FCS football season
- 2020–21 NCAA Division II football season
- 2020–21 NCAA Division III football season
- 2020 NAIA football season

== Non-American leagues ==
- 2020 U Sports football season
