= Cameron Dukes =

American gridiron football player (born 1998)

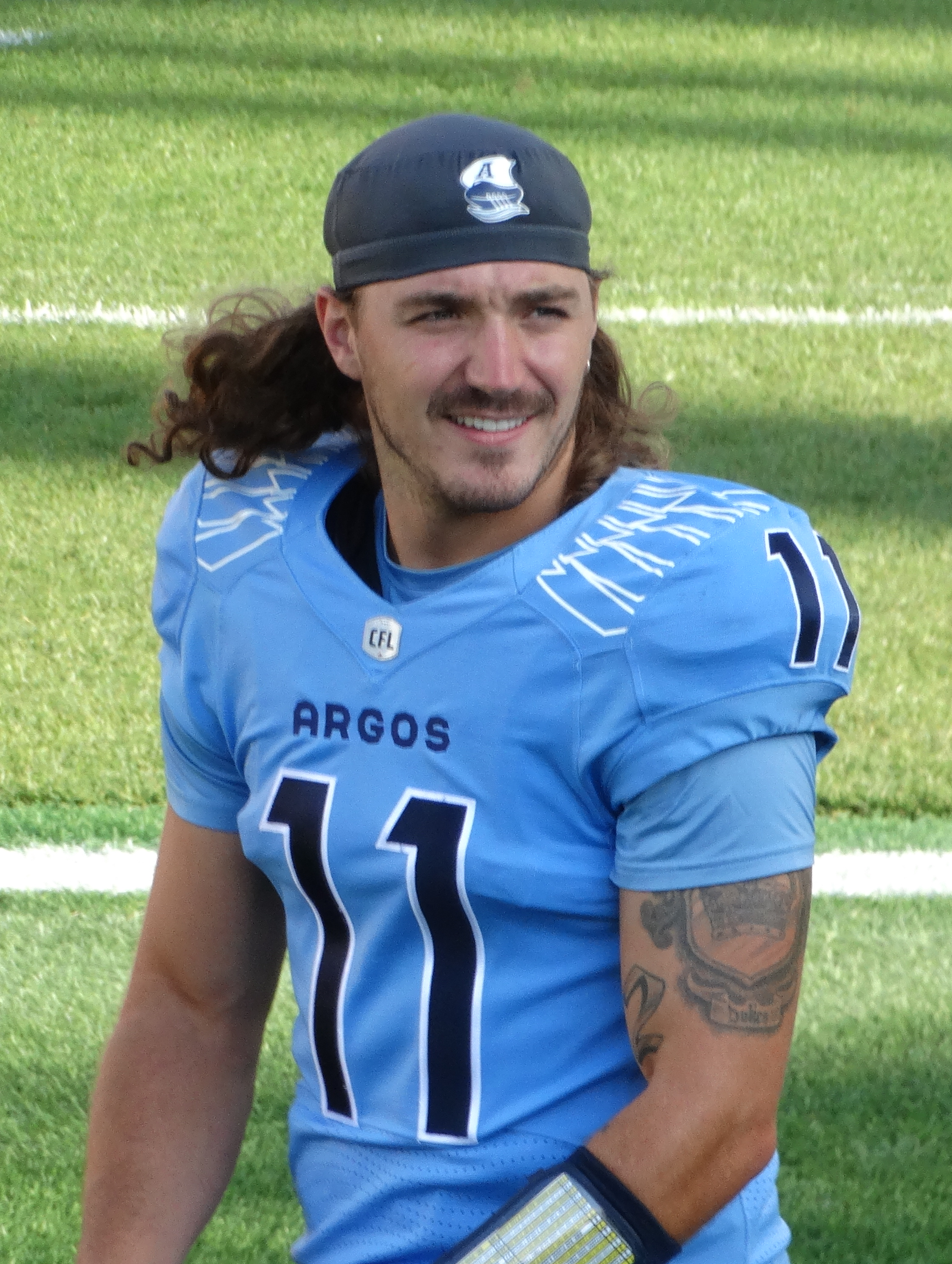
- Dukes with the Toronto Argonauts in 2024

Vegas Knight Hawks
- Position: Quarterback
- Roster status: Active

Personal information
- Born: August 13, 1998 (age 28); Shepherdsville, Kentucky, U.S.
- Listed height: 6 ft 0 in (1.83 m)
- Listed weight: 210 lb (95 kg)

Career information
- High school: Shepherdsville (KY) Bullitt Central
- College: Lindsey Wilson (2016–2021)
- NFL draft: 2021: undrafted

Career history
- Vegas Knight Hawks (2022); Toronto Argonauts (2023–2024); Montreal Alouettes (2025); Vegas Knight Hawks (2027-present)

Awards and highlights
- Grey Cup champion (2024); NAIA national champion (2020)

Career CFL statistics as of 2024
- Rushing attempts: 92
- Rushing yards: 447
- Touchdowns: 12 rushing / 9 passing
- Passing attempts: 206/295 (69.8%)
- Passing yards: 2,204
- Stats at CFL.ca

Cameron Dukes (born August 13, 1998) is an American professional football quarterback who plays for the Vegas Knight Hawks of the Indoor Football League.

== College career ==
Dukes played college football for the Lindsey Wilson Blue Raiders from 2016 to 2021. He played in 49 games, starting in 45, where he threw for 10,439 yards and 114 touchdowns. In the 2020–21 season, Dukes led the Blue Raiders to a NAIA national championship victory over the Northwestern Red Raiders.

== Professional career ==
=== Vegas Knight Hawks ===
Dukes signed with the Vegas Knight Hawks of the Indoor Football League (IFL) on May 17, 2022. During the 2022 IFL season, which was the inaugural season for the Knight Hawks, he passed for 1,100 yards and 27 touchdowns in eight games.

=== Toronto Argonauts ===
On March 9, 2023, Dukes signed with the Toronto Argonauts of the CFL. During the 2023 CFL season, Dukes acted as a backup for starter Chad Kelly and as a short yardage quarterback sneak specialist, scoring his first CFL rushing touchdown on July 3, 2023, against the BC Lions. Dukes saw his first action leading the Argonauts offence on August 4, 2023, taking over for an injured Kelly in a 20–7 loss to the Calgary Stampeders. Dukes dressed in all 18 regular season games, starting in two, where he completed 63 of 96 pass attempts for 760 yards with two touchdown passes and three interceptions. He also had 35 carries for 126 yards and eight touchdowns, primarily in short-yardage situations. He also dressed in the East Final loss to the Montreal Alouettes where he had two carries for two yards and one touchdown on his post-season debut.

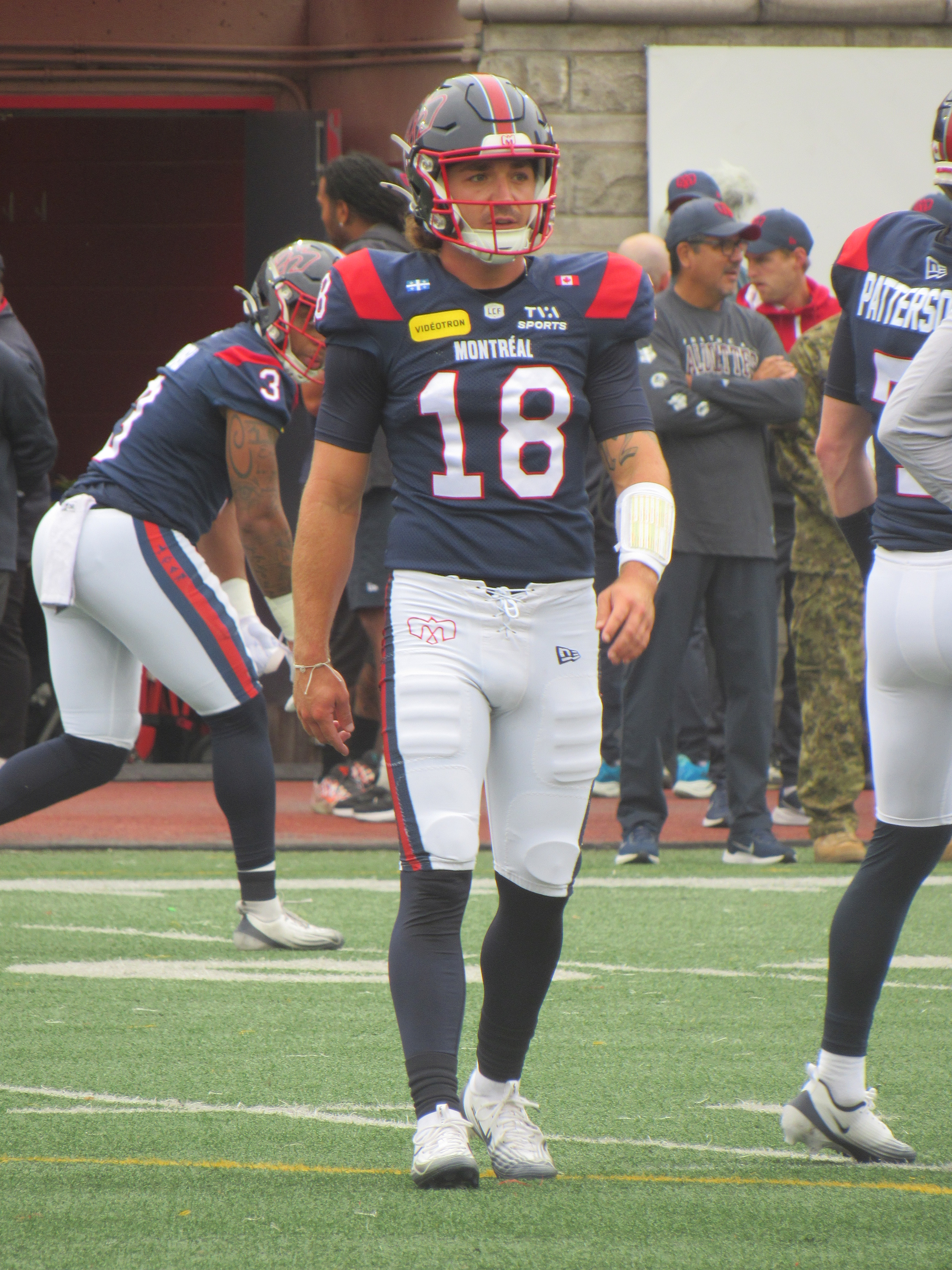
Dukes with the Montreal Alouettes in 2025

On May 7, 2024, Kelly was suspended for at least nine games after an investigation into allegations made against him and the Argonauts by a former strength and conditioning coach. Consequently, Dukes was elevated to the starting role for 2024 that he won during training camp. After winning his first two starts of the season, he won just two of the next six, leading the Argonauts to turn to Nick Arbuckle for their ninth game of the season, which he won. Kelly then returned from suspension and Dukes was his backup. With their season standing decided, the Argonauts started Dukes for their final game of the season, but he left due to injury and Arbuckle took over.

In total, Dukes dressed for 18 regular season games, starting in nine, where he completed 143 out of 199 pass attempts for 1,444 yards and seven touchdown passes and six interceptions. In the East Final, Kelly was injured and Arbuckle replaced him, eventually being named the starter for the 111th Grey Cup. In his first Grey Cup game, Dukes was the primary backup quarterback, but only entered the game in the final minute to kneel down in victory formation as the Argonauts defeated the Winnipeg Blue Bombers 41–24. In 2025, he played in both preseason games, but was part of the final cuts on June 1, 2025.

=== Montreal Alouettes ===
On August 13, 2025, it was announced that Dukes had signed with the Montreal Alouettes on the same day that McLeod Bethel-Thompson was moved to the six-game injured list. He dressed in three regular season games where he had one completion for eight yards. Dukes was later released on October 7.

=== Vegas Knight Hawks (second stint) ===
On November 6, 2026, Dukes signed with the Vegas Knight Hawks of the Indoor Football League.
