= 2020 NAIA football rankings =

The 2020 NAIA football rankings reports the poll results conducted during the 2020 NAIA football season. Each season, one poll evaluates the various National Association of Intercollegiate Athletics (NAIA) football teams and ranks them. Coaches from each of the football conferences are members of a selection panel, with conferences receiving one vote for every four member teams. Sometimes referred to as the football ratings or the NAIA Coaches' Poll, the poll is generally conducted once during the preseason and after each week of play during the regular season.

Once the regular season is completed, the NAIA will conduct a playoff to determine the year's national champion. A final poll will be taken after completion of the series of playoff games, collectively referred to as the 2020 NAIA Football National Championship.

The Top 25 was determined by compiling points for each vote. A team received 25 points for each first-place vote, 24 for second-place and so on through the list. The highest and lowest ranking for each team (counting zero for ballots with no votes for a team) were disregarded. To obtain the final tally, each team's ranking was recalculated with an additional point added to each team for every ballot (including discounted ballots) that includes the team.

As an example, if there were 17 voting panelists, and one team is a unanimous choice for the highest ranking, then that team would receive 25 points * 15 ballots (disregard 2 ballots) + 17 points (one for each ballot cast) = 392 points.

Teams that received only one point in the ballot were not considered “receiving votes.”

== Poll release dates ==
Due to the COVID-19 pandemic, modifications to the playing season and associated polls and release dates were made. Some teams were able to compete and complete their seasons in the fall of 2020; however, a large portion of the NAIA season was delayed until the spring of 2021.

No spring or preseason polls were released for the 2020 season; the first poll was released after the spring playing season was underway.

Following is a complete schedule of 2020 poll release dates.

2020 poll release dates
Spring	None
Preseason	None
Poll 1	February 22, 2021
Poll 2	March 22, 2021
Poll 3	March 29, 2021
Poll 4	April 5, 2021
Poll 5	April 11, 2021
Postseason	May 17, 2021

== Week by week poll ==
	Week 1 Feb 22	Week 2 Mar 22	Week 3 Mar 29	Week 4 Apr 5	Week 5 Apr 11	Week Postseason May 17	
1.	Morningside (IA) (8–0) (17)	Morningside (IA) (8–0) (17)	Morningside (IA) (8–0) (17)	Morningside (IA) (8–0) (17)	Morningside (IA) (8–0) (17)	Lindsey Wilson (11–0)	1.
2.	Marian (IN) (1–0)	Grand View (IA) (6–0) (1)	Grand View (IA) (6–0) (1)	Grand View (IA) (6–0) (1)	Grand View (IA) (6–0) (1)	Northwestern (IA) (11–2)	2.
3.	Grand View (IA) (6–0) (1)	Lindsey Wilson (KY) (5–0)	Lindsey Wilson (KY) (5–0)	Lindsey Wilson (KY) (6–0)	Lindsey Wilson (KY) (7–0)	Morningside (10–1)	3.
4.	Lindsey Wilson (KY) (1–0)	Keiser (FL) (6–0)	Keiser (FL) (7–0)	Keiser (FL) (7–0)	Keiser (FL) (7–0)	Keiser (9–1)	4.
5.	College of Idaho (0–0)	College of Idaho (2–0)	Concordia (MI) (5–0)	Concordia (MI) (5–0)	Concordia (MI) (5–0)	Grand View (7–1)	5.
6.	Keiser (FL) (6–0)	Concordia (MI) (4–0)	College of Idaho (2–0)	College of Idaho (3–0)	Northwestern (IA) (8–1)	Concordia (MI) (6–1)	6.
7.	Northwestern (IA) (8–1)	Northwestern (IA) (8–1)	Northwestern (IA) (8–1)	Northwestern (IA) (8–1)	Baker (KS) (6–0)	Baker (7–1)	7.
8.	Baker (KS) (6–0)	Baker (KS) (6–0)	Baker (KS) (6–0)	Baker (KS) (6–0)	Reinhardt (GA) (8–0)	Reinhardt (9–1)	8.
9.	Saint Francis (IN) (0–0)	Marian (IN) (3–1)	Reinhardt (GA) (7–0)	Reinhardt (GA) (8–0)	Marian (IN) (5–1)	Olivet Nazarene (8–1)	9.
10.	Reinhardt (GA) (2–0)	Reinhardt (GA) (6–0)	Marian (IN) (3–1)	Marian (IN) (4–1)	Dickinson State (ND) (9–0)	Marian (IN) (5–2)	10.
11.	Bethel (KS) (8–0)	Bethel (KS) (9–0)	Saint Francis (IN) (2–1)	Saint Francis (IN) (2–1)	Olivet Nazarene (IL) (8–0)	Dickinson State (9–1)	11.
12.	Dickinson State (ND) (9–0)	Saint Francis (IN) (2–1)	Dickinson State (ND) (9–0)	Dickinson State (ND) (9–0)	Arizona Christian (9–1)	Bethel (KS) (9–2)	12.
13.	Concordia (MI) (0–0)	Dickinson State (ND) (9–0)	Olivet Nazarene (IL) (6–0)	Olivet Nazarene (IL) (7–0)	Bethel (KS) (9–1)	Georgetown (KY) (6–2)	13.
14.	Saint Xavier (IL) (1–1)	Olivet Nazarene (IL) (6–0)	Arizona Christian (8–1)	Arizona Christian (8–1)	Georgetown (KY) (6–1)	Arizona Christian (9–2)	14.
15.	Benedictine (KS) (7–2)	Benedictine (KS) (7–2)	Bethel (KS) (9–1)	Bethel (KS) (9–1)	College of Idaho (3–1)	Dordt (8–3)	15.
16.	Ottawa (AZ) (0–0)	Arizona Christian (7–1)	Georgetown (KY) (4–1)	Georgetown (KY) (5–1)	Benedictine (KS) (8–2)	Benedictine (KS) (8–2)	16.
17.	Cumberlands (KY) (1–1)	Georgetown (KY) (4–1)	Benedictine (KS) (7–2)	Dordt (IA) (8–2)	Saint Francis (IN) (2–2)	Saint Francis (IN) (2–2)	17.
18.	Dordt (IA) (7–2)	(T) Saint Xavier (IL) (4–1)	Dordt (IA) (8–2)	Benedictine (KS) (7–2)	Dordt (IA) (8–2)	College of Idaho (3–1)	18.
19.	Georgetown (KY) (1–0)	(T) Dordt (IA) (7–2)	Avila (MO) (7–1)	Avila (MO) (8–1)	Avila (MO) (8–1)	Avila (8–1)	19.
20.	Roosevelt (IL) (2–0)	Avila (MO) (6–1)	Eastern Oregon (2–0)	Roosevelt (IL) (5–1)	(T) Roosevelt (IL) (6–1)	Roosevelt (6–1)	20.
21.	Southwestern (KS) (4–1)	Eastern Oregon (1–0)	Roosevelt (IL) (4–1)	Eastern Oregon (2–1)	(T) Eastern Oregon (3–1)	Eastern Oregon (3–1)	21.
22.	Siena Heights (MI) (0–0)	Roosevelt (IL) (3–1)	Southwestern (KS) (6–2)	Ottawa (AZ) (3–1)	Carroll (MT) (3–1)	Carroll (MT) (3–2)	22.
23.	Avila (MO) (5–1)	Southwestern (KS) (5–2)	Ottawa (AZ) (2–1)	Kansas Wesleyan (8–2)	Ottawa (AZ) (4–1)	Ottawa (AZ) (4–1)	23.
24.	Arizona Christian (4–1)	Ottawa (AZ) (1–1)	Kansas Wesleyan (7–2)	Southwestern (KS) (6–2)	Southwestern (KS) (6–2)	Southwestern (KS) (6–2)	24.
25.	Olivet Nazarene (IL) (5–1)	Bethel (TN) (3–1)	Valley City State (ND) (5–2)	Valley City State (ND) (5–2)	Kansas Wesleyan (8–2)	Kansas Wesleyan (8–2)	25.
	Week 1 Feb 22	Week 2 Mar 22	Week 3 Mar 29	Week 4 Apr 5	Week 5 Apr 11	Week Postseason May 17	
		Dropped: Cumberlands (KY); Siena Heights (MI)	Dropped: Saint Xavier (IL); Bethel (TN)	None	Dropped: Valley City State (ND)	None	

Legend
	No change in ranking
	Increase in ranking
	Decrease in ranking
	Not ranked previous week
	NAIA National Champion
(#-#)	Win–loss record
Italics	Number of first place votes
(т)	Tied with team above or below also with this symbol

== The postseason tournament ==
A 16-team tournament is being contested to determine the winner of the 2020 NAIA Football National Championship. Teams were selected to the field of participants through a two-tiered selection process.

First, any conference champion ranked in the final regular-season Coaches' Poll received an automatic bid into the tourney field. This was a modification (due to the COVID-19 pandemic) to the normal requirement that a champion needed to finish in the top 20 positions to receive an automatic invitation.

After the automatic bids were granted, any open positions in the field were filled with at-large invitations. These at-large entries were granted to the highest ranked teams who were not conference champions, with some ranked teams omitted due to lack of playing a minimum number of conference games.

In 2020, there were 12 NAIA conferences (or divisions within large conferences) who had champions that were part of the selection process for the automatic invitations. The 12 eligible conferences for the 2020 season were:

Conference	Division
Frontier Conference	
Great Plains Athletic Conference	
Heart of America Athletic Conference	North
Heart of America Athletic Conference	South
Kansas Collegiate Athletic Conference	
Mid-South Conference	Appalachian
Mid-South Conference	Bluegrass
Mid-South Conference	Sun
Mid-States Football Association	Mideast
Mid-States Football Association	Midwest
North Star Athletic Association	
Sooner Athletic Conference	

Based on the Poll 5 (April 11) Coaches' Poll, the following teams (12 champions and 4 at-large teams) made up the 2020 playoff field:

Rank	Team	Conference/division	Invitation type
1	Morningside (IA)	Great Plains	Automatic - 1
2	Grand View (IA)	Heart of America / North	Automatic - 2
3	Lindsey Wilson (KY)	Mid-South / Bluegrass	Automatic - 3
4	Keiser (FL)	Mid-South / Sun	Automatic - 4
5	Concordia (MI)	Mid-States / Mideast	Automatic - 5
6	Northwestern (IA)	Great Plains	At-large - 1
7	Baker (KS)	Heart of America / South	Automatic - 6
8	Reinhardt (GA)	Mid-South / Appalachian	Automatic - 7
9	Marian (IN)	Mid-States / Mideast	At-large - 2
10	Dickinson State (ND)	North Star	Automatic - 8
11	Olivet Nazarene (IL)	Mid-States / Midwest	Automatic - 9
12	Arizona Christian	Sooner	Automatic - 10
13	Bethel (KS)	Kansas Collegiate	Automatic - 11
14	Georgetown (KY)	Mid-South / Bluegrass	At-large - 3
15	College of Idaho	Frontier	(Not enough games)
16	Benedictine (KS)	Heart of America / South	(Not enough games)
17	Saint Francis (IN)	Mid-States / Mideast	(Not enough games)
18	Dordt (IA)	Great Plains	At-large - 4
19	Avila (MO)	Kansas Collegiate	(No bids available)
20	Roosevelt (IL)	Mid-States / Midwest	(No bids available)
21	Eastern Oregon	Frontier	(Did not qualify)
22	Carroll (MT)	Frontier	Automatic - 12
23	Ottawa (AZ)	Sooner	(Did not qualify)
24	Southwestern (KS)	Kansas Collegiate	(Did not qualify)
25	Kansas Wesleyan	Kansas Collegiate	(Did not qualify)

After the tournament participants were determined, the top 8 seeds were granted first round home games. The lone exception was #5 Concordia (MI), who played an away game due to restrictions in Michigan caused by the COVID-19 pandemic. Opponents were generally determined based on the oft-used tournament protocol that pairs highest seeds with lowest seeds: #1 vs. the lowest seeded entry (usually #16), #2 vs. the second-lowest seeded entry (usually #15), #3 vs. the third-lowest seeded entry (usually #14), etc. This alignment was then tweaked, for geographic and travel considerations, by the tournament selection officials to determine the announced first-round pairings.

The first round tournament match-ups, finalized and announced on Sunday, April 11 , were:

Rank	Visitor		Rank	Home
#22	Carroll (MT)	at	#1	Morningside (IA)
#18	Dordt (IA)	at	#2	Grand View (IA)
#13	Bethel (KS)	at	#3	Lindsey Wilson (KY)
#12	Arizona Christian	at	#4	Keiser (FL)
#5	Concordia (MI)	at	#14	Georgetown (KY)
#10	Dickinson State (ND)	at	#6	Northwestern (IA)
#11	Olivet Nazarene (IL)	at	#7	Baker (KS)
#9	Marian (IN)	at	#8	Reinhardt (GA)

== Leading vote-getters ==
Since the inception of the Coaches' Poll in 1999, the #1 ranking in the various weekly polls has been held by only a select group of teams. Through Poll 5 of the 2020 season, the teams and the number of times they have held the #1 weekly ranking are shown below. The number of times a team has been ranked #1 in the postseason poll (the national champion) is shown in parentheses.

There has been only one tie for the leading vote-getter in a weekly poll. In 2015, Southern Oregon was tied with Marian (IN) in the preseason poll.

In 1999, the results of a postseason poll, if one was conducted, are not known. Therefore, an additional poll has been presumed, and the #1 postseason ranking has been credited to the postseason tournament champion, the Northwestern Oklahoma State Rangers.

Team	Total #1 rankings
Carroll (MT)	57 (6)
Sioux Falls (SD)	55 (3)
Morningside (IA)	45 (2)
Georgetown (KY)	25 (2)
Marian (IN)	24 (2)
Saint Francis (IN)	21 (2)
Saint Xavier (IL)	14 (1)
Northwestern Oklahoma State	12 (1)
Southern Oregon	5 (1)
Grand View (IA)	4 (1)
Lindsey Wilson (KY)	4
Azusa Pacific (CA)	3
Cumberlands (KY)	2
