= 2020–21 NAIA football season =

American college football season

2020 NAIA football season
- Regular season: Fall 2020 – Spring 2021
- Postseason: April 17 – May 10, 2021
- National Championship: Eddie Robinson Stadium; Grambing, LA; May 10, 2021
- Champion: Lindsey Wilson
- Player of the Year: Tyson Kooima (quarterback, Northwestern (IA))

The 2020–21 NAIA football season was the component of the 2020 college football season organized by the National Association of Intercollegiate Athletics (NAIA) in the United States. The regular season for many teams was moved to spring 2021 in light of the COVID-19 pandemic-related measures and protocols. The season's playoffs, known as the NAIA Football National Championship, culminated with the championship game on May 10, 2021, at Eddie Robinson Stadium in Grambling, Louisiana. It was originally scheduled for December 19, 2020. The Lindsey Wilson Blue Raiders defeated the Northwestern Red Raiders, 45–13, in the title game to win the program's first NAIA championship.

== Conference changes and new programs ==
=== Membership changes ===
School	Former conference	New conference
Florida Memorial Lions	Revived program	Mid-South Sun
Madonna Crusaders	New program	MSFA Mideast
Roosevelt Lakers	New program	MSFA Midwest

Roosevelt acquired Robert Morris University's football team in April 2020 after merging with Robert Morris.

== Conference standings ==
2020 Frontier Conference football standings
	Conf.			Overall
Team	W		L	W		L
No. 19 College of Idaho +	3	–	1	3	–	1
No. 21 Eastern Oregon +	3	–	1	3	–	1
No. 22 Carroll (MT) +^	3	–	1	3	–	2
Rocky Mountain	1	–	3	1	–	3
Montana State–Northern	0	–	4	0	–	4
+ – Conference co-champions; ^ – NAIA playoff participant; Rankings from NAIA Coaches' Poll

2020 Great Plains Athletic Conference football standings
	Conf.			Overall
Team	W		L	W		L
No. 3 Morningside $^	8	–	0	10	–	1
No. 2 Northwestern (IA) ^	8	–	1	11	–	2
No. 15 Dordt ^	7	–	2	7	–	3
Midland	5	–	3	5	–	3
Concordia (NE)	4	–	4	4	–	4
Dakota Wesleyan	4	–	5	4	–	5
Doane	2	–	5	2	–	5
Hastings	2	–	7	2	–	8
Jamestown	1	–	7	1	–	7
Briar Cliff	1	–	8	1	–	8
$ – Conference champion; ^ – NAIA playoff participant; Rankings from NAIA Coaches' Poll

2020 Heart of America Athletic Conference football standings
	Conf.			Overall
Team	W		L	W		L
North
No. 4 Grand View x^	3	–	0	7	–	1
Clarke	1	–	0	2	–	3
William Penn	2	–	1	4	–	3
Peru State	0	–	0	1	–	2
Culver–Stockton	0	–	2	1	–	3
Graceland	0	–	3	0	–	5
South
No. 7 Baker x^	4	–	0	7	–	1
No. 16 Benedictine (KS)	4	–	1	8	–	2
Central Methodist	3	–	2	5	–	4
MidAmerica Nazarene	2	–	3	2	–	6
Evangel	1	–	3	2	–	5
Missouri Valley	0	–	5	1	–	6
x – Division champion/co-champions; ^ – NAIA playoff participant; Rankings from NAIA Coaches' Poll

2020 Kansas Collegiate Athletic Conference football standings
	Conf.			Overall
Team	W		L	W		L
No. 19 Avila +	6	–	1	8	–	1
No. 12 Bethel (KS) +^	6	–	1	9	–	2
No. 25 Kansas Wesleyan	5	–	2	8	–	2
No. 24 Southwestern (KS)	5	–	2	7	–	2
Ottawa (KS)	2	–	5	5	–	5
Friends	2	–	5	2	–	6
Tabor	1	–	6	3	–	7
Sterling	1	–	6	1	–	8
McPherson	0	–	0	3	–	4
Bethany (KS)	0	–	0	1	–	4
Saint Mary (KS)	0	–	0	0	–	4
$ – Conference champion; ^ – NAIA playoff participant; Rankings from NAIA Coaches' Poll

2020 Mid-South Conference football standings
	Conf.			Overall
Team	W		L	W		L
Appalachian Division
No. 8 Reinhardt x^	6	–	0	9	–	1
Faulkner	5	–	1	6	–	2
Kentucky Christian	4	–	2	6	–	2
St. Andrews	2	–	3	3	–	3
Union (KY)	1	–	4	1	–	6
Bluefield	1	–	5	2	–	7
Point	1	–	5	1	–	7
Bluegrass Division
No. 1 Lindsey Wilson x^	7	–	0	11	–	0
No. 13 Georgetown (KY) ^	6	–	1	6	–	2
Cumberlands (KY)	4	–	3	4	–	3
Bethel (TN)	3	–	4	3	–	4
Pikeville	3	–	4	3	–	4
Cumberland (TN)	2	–	5	2	–	5
Thomas More	2	–	5	2	–	5
Campbellsville	1	–	6	1	–	6
Sun Division
No. 4 Keiser x^	5	–	0	9	–	1
Southeastern	3	–	1	5	–	1
St. Thomas (FL)	3	–	2	4	–	3
Ave Maria	2	–	3	3	–	4
Warner	1	–	3	2	–	4
Webber International	1	–	5	1	–	7
Florida Memorial	0	–	1	0	–	3
x – Division champion/co-champions; ^ – NAIA playoff participant; Rankings from NAIA Coaches' Poll

2020 Mid-States Football Association standings
	Conf.			Overall
Team	W		L	W		L
Mideast League
No. 6 Concordia (MI) x^	4	–	0	6	–	1
No. 10 Marian (IN) ^	3	–	1	5	–	2
No. 17 Saint Francis (IN)	2	–	2	2	–	2
Indiana Wesleyan	2	–	3	2	–	3
Siena Heights	1	–	2	2	–	2
Lawrence Tech	0	–	1	0	–	2
Taylor	0	–	4	0	–	4
Midwest League
No. 9 Olivet Nazarene x^	8	–	0	8	–	1
No. 20 Roosevelt	5	–	1	6	–	1
St. Ambrose	4	–	2	5	–	3
Saint Xavier	3	–	3	5	–	3
St. Francis (IL)	2	–	4	2	–	6
Missouri Baptist	1	–	6	1	–	6
Trinity International	0	–	6	0	–	7
x – League champion/co-champions ^ – NAIA playoff participant; Rankings from NAIA Coaches' Poll

2020 North Star Athletic Association football standings
	Conf.			Overall
Team	W		L	W		L
No. 11 Dickinson State $^	9	–	0	9	–	1
Valley City State	5	–	2	5	–	2
Waldorf	6	–	3	6	–	3
Dakota State	4	–	5	4	–	5
Mayville State	1	–	6	2	–	7
Presentation	0	–	9	0	–	10
$ – Conference champion; ^ – NAIA playoff participant; Rankings from NAIA Coaches' Poll

2020 Sooner Athletic Conference football standings
	Conf.			Overall
Team	W		L	W		L
No. 14 Arizona Christian $^	6	–	0	9	–	2
No. 23 Ottawa (AZ)	4	–	1	4	–	1
SAGU	3	–	2	4	–	3
Langston	2	–	3	2	–	3
OK Panhandle State	2	–	3	2	–	8
Wayland Baptist	1	–	4	2	–	5
Texas Wesleyan	0	–	0	1	–	1
Texas College	0	–	0	0	–	0
Lyon	0	–	5	0	–	5
$ – Conference champion; ^ – NAIA playoff participant; Rankings from NAIA Coaches' Poll

2020 NAIA independents football records
	Conf.			Overall
Team	W		L	W		L
Edward Waters		–		1	–	2
Madonna		–		0	–	4

== Postseason ==
=== Bracket ===
1st Round; April 17, 2021
3	Lindsey Wilson	42
14	Bethel (KS)	10
5	Concordia (MI)	21
12	Georgetown (KY)	7
4	Keiser	63
15	Arizona Christian	21
8	Reinhardt	40
9	Marian (IN)	29
1	Morningside	55
16	Carroll (MT)	0
7	Baker	59
10	Olivet Nazarene	54
2	Grand View	38
13	Dordt	10
6	Northwestern (IA)	31
11	Dickinson State	7

Quarterfinals; April 24, 2021
3	Lindsey Wilson	49
5	Concordia (MI)	27
4	Keiser	42
8	Reinhardt	14
1	Morningside	45
7	Baker	29
2	Grand View	24
6	Northwestern (IA)	27

Semifinals; May 1, 2021
3	Lindsey Wilson	38
4	Keiser	14
1	Morningside	41
6	Northwestern (IA)	44

Championship; May 10, 2021
3	Lindsey Wilson	45
6	Northwestern (IA)	13

== See also ==
- 2020 NCAA Division I FBS football season
- 2020–21 NCAA Division I FCS football season
- 2020–21 NCAA Division II football season
- 2020–21 NCAA Division III football season
