= 2020 Lindsey Wilson Blue Raiders football team =

American college football season

2020 Lindsey Wilson Blue Raiders football

NAIA national champion MSC Bluegrass Division champion

NAIA National Championship Game, W 45–13 vs. Northwestern (IA)
- Conference: Mid-South Conference
- Bluegrass Division
- Record: 11–0 (7–0 MSC)
- Head coach: Chris Oliver (11th season)
- Defensive coordinator: Phil Kleckler (4th season)

2020 Mid-South Conference football standings
	Conf.			Overall
Team	W		L	W		L
Appalachian Division
No. 8 Reinhardt x^	6	–	0	9	–	1
Faulkner	5	–	1	6	–	2
Kentucky Christian	4	–	2	6	–	2
St. Andrews	2	–	3	3	–	3
Union (KY)	1	–	4	1	–	6
Bluefield	1	–	5	2	–	7
Point	1	–	5	1	–	7
Bluegrass Division
No. 1 Lindsey Wilson x^	7	–	0	11	–	0
No. 13 Georgetown (KY) ^	6	–	1	6	–	2
Cumberlands (KY)	4	–	3	4	–	3
Bethel (TN)	3	–	4	3	–	4
Pikeville	3	–	4	3	–	4
Cumberland (TN)	2	–	5	2	–	5
Thomas More	2	–	5	2	–	5
Campbellsville	1	–	6	1	–	6
Sun Division
No. 4 Keiser x^	5	–	0	9	–	1
Southeastern	3	–	1	5	–	1
St. Thomas (FL)	3	–	2	4	–	3
Ave Maria	2	–	3	3	–	4
Warner	1	–	3	2	–	4
Webber International	1	–	5	1	–	7
Florida Memorial	0	–	1	0	–	3
x – Division champion/co-champions; ^ – NAIA playoff participant; Rankings from NAIA Coaches' Poll

The 2020 Lindsey Wilson Blue Raiders football team was an American football team that represented Lindsey Wilson College as a member of the Mid-South Conference during the 2020 NAIA football season. In their 11th season under head coach Chris Oliver, the Blue Raiders compiled an 11–0 record (7–0 against conference opponents) and won the NAIA national championship, defeating the Northwestern Red Raiders, 45–13, in the NAIA National Championship Game. Due to the COVID-19 pandemic, the 2020 season was delayed until the winter and spring of 2021.

== Schedule ==
Date	Time	Opponent	Rank	Site	Result	Attendance	Source
February 12, 2021	1:30 p.m.	Pikeville		Blue Raider Stadium; Columbia, KY	W 49–0	468	
February 26, 2021	2:30 p.m.	No. 17 Cumberlands (KY)	No. 4	Blue Raider Stadium; Columbia, KY	W 45–10	1,359	
March 5, 2021	2:30 p.m.	at No. 19 Georgetown (KY)	No. 4	Toyota Stadium; Georgetown, KY	W 35–14	415	
March 12, 2021	6:00 p.m.	at Cumberland (TN)	No. 4	Nokes-Lasater Field; Lebanon, TN	W 56–22	850	
March 19, 2021	6:00 p.m.	Thomas More	No. 4	Blue Raider Stadium; Columbia, KY	W 52–20	485	
April 1, 2021	6:00 p.m.	at Campbellsville	No. 3	Ron Finley Stadium; Campbellsville, KY	W 49–21		
April 9, 2021	6:00 p.m.	Bethel (TN)	No. 3	Blue Raider Stadium; Columbia, KY	W 49–7	465	
April 17, 2021	12:30 p.m.	No. 14 Bethel (KS)*	No. 3	Blue Raider Stadium; Columbia, KY (NAIA first round)	W 42–10	541	
April 24, 2021	12:30 p.m.	No. 5 Concordia (MI)*	No. 3	Blue Raider Stadium; Columbia, KY (NAIA quarterfinal)	W 49–27	453	
May 1, 2021	12:30 p.m.	No. 4 Keiser*	No. 3	Blue Raider Stadium; Columbia, KY (NAIA semifinal)	W 38–14	568	
May 10, 2021	6:05 p.m.	vs. No. 6 Northwestern (IA)*	No. 3	Eddie Robinson Stadium; Grambling, LA (NAIA Championship Game)	W 45–13	1,241	
*Non-conference game; Rankings from NAIA Poll released prior to the game; All times are in Central time
