= Point Skyhawks football =

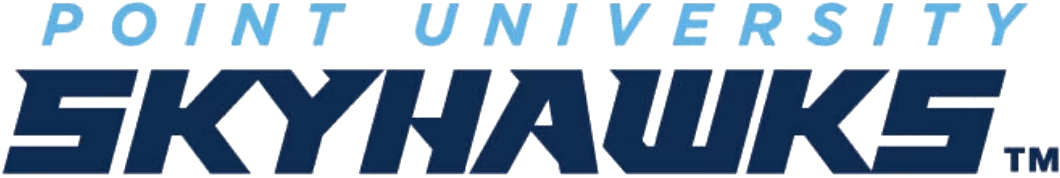
- First season: 2012; 14 years ago
- Head coach: Nigel Lawrence; 1st season, 4–6 (.400)
- Location: West Point, Georgia
- Conference: Appalachian Athletic Conference
- Division: Appalachian
- Colors: Navy blue and gold
- Outfitter: Nike
- Website: skyhawkathletics.com/football

The Point Skyhawks football program represents Point University in college football. They are football-only members of the Appalachian Athletic Conference and compete at the National Association of Intercollegiate Athletics (NAIA) level. The Skyhawks field their home games at Ram Stadium in nearby Valley, Alabama a venue with a grass surface and seating for approximately 6,000 spectators . Established in 2012, the football program first competed as an NAIA independent before joining The Sun Conference for the 2014–2015 seasons, then transitioning to the Mid-South Conference’s Appalachian Division from 2017 to 2021. In 2022, football reestablished its affiliation with the Appalachian Athletic Conference as a football-only member, while the university’s other sports began competing in the Southern States Athletic Conference starting in the 2023–24 academic year. Point University’s football program achieved its first winning season in 2015, finishing with a school-best 9–3 record and capturing the NCCAA Victory Bowl championship. Over the years, the Skyhawks have produced numerous All-Conference selections, including First-Team honorees in both the Mid-South Conference and the Appalachian Athletic Conference. In 2021, wide receiver Chase Turner became the program’s first NAIA First-Team All-American, followed in 2022 by linebacker Aaron Anderson, who earned Associated Press First-Team All-America honors and an AFCA Honorable Mention All-America selection—marking two of the highest individual accolades in program history.
