= St. Andrews Knights football =

- First season: 2017
- Last season: 2024
- Location: Laurinburg, North Carolina
- Conference: Appalachian Athletic Conference
- Division: Appalachian
- Colors: Blue and White
- Outfitter: Under Armour
- Website: SAUKnights.com

The St. Andrews Knights football program were affiliated with St. Andrews University of Laurinburg, North Carolina in college football. They were members of the Appalachian Athletic Conference and competed at the National Association of Intercollegiate Athletics (NAIA) level. They were previously football-only members of the Mid-South Conference. 2017 was the first season for the football program.
