= Lindsey Wilson University =

United Methodist college in Columbia, Kentucky, US

- Former names: Lindsey Wilson Training School (1903–1923); Lindsey Wilson Junior College (1923–1985); Lindsey Wilson College (1985–2025)
- Motto: Every Student, Every Day
- Type: Private university
- Established: 1903; 123 years ago
- Religious affiliation: United Methodist Church
- Endowment: $64 million (2017)
- Chancellor: John B. Begley
- President: William T. Luckey Jr.
- Students: 2,590
- Undergraduates: 2,144
- Postgraduates: 446
- Location: Columbia, Kentucky, United States; 37.1028°N 85.3015°W
- Colors: Lindsey Blue & White
- Nickname: Blue Raiders
- Sporting affiliations: NAIA – Mid-South
- Mascot: Blue Raider Bob
- Website: lindsey.edu

Lindsey Wilson University is a private, United Methodist-related university in Columbia, Kentucky. Founded in 1903 as a training school, the university now offers in-person and online degree programs, offered at the associate, bachelor's, master's, and doctoral levels.

== History ==
Lindsey Wilson University was founded in 1903 as a training school by the Louisville Conference of the Methodist Episcopal Church, South. Named in memory after the late nephew and stepson of Catherine Wilson of Lebanon, Kentucky, who died in 1902, the school was originally called "Lindsey Wilson Training School" to prepare young people of the area for coursework at Vanderbilt University and training students to become educators.

Lindsey Wilson's first day of classes was held on January 3, 1904, attended by 222 students. The college ended its relationship with Vanderbilt in 1914 and in 1923 Lindsey Wilson became "Lindsey Wilson Junior College" when it expanded its curriculum to offer a two-year liberal arts program. In 1951, the college received accreditation from the Southern Association of Colleges and Schools. The training school remained on campus until 1979.

At its 1985 April meeting, the Lindsey Wilson Board of Trustees voted to transform the college into a four-year liberal arts college and gained its present name. The bachelor's degree was the highest degree attainable at the college until 1993 when a master of education in counseling and human development was launched. A doctorate of philosophy in counselor education and supervision began in 2014.

At homecoming 1991, the college's main campus was named the A.P. White Campus, in honor of the college's second president, who shepherded the school through the Great Depression.

Among the first buildings on campus were the current L.R. McDonald Administration Building (funded in part by Catherine Wilson's estate gift) and Phillip's Hall (funded by Mrs. James Phillips and Mrs. Kizzie Russell, both of Russell County, Kentucky). Many photographs can be found in the Katie Murrell Library of the Holloway Building that depict the early years of the institution. The Holloway Building also includes the Thomas D. Clark Reading Room, named in honor of the late Kentucky historian laureate who donated his personal library to the college.

In the 2000s, Lindsey Wilson's A.P. White Campus underwent a transformation, thanks to more than $100 million in capital projects: the Jim and Helen Lee Fugitte Science Center, funded by the biggest single gift in college history, was completed in fall 2007; Lindsey Wilson Sports Park – which includes a football and track & field stadium, Egnew Park baseball field and Marilyn D. Sparks Park softball field – opened in 2009; the Doris and Robert Holloway Health & Wellness Center opened in February 2010; Dr. Robert and Carol Goodin Nursing and Counseling Center opened in fall 2011; and four residence halls were added to the campus between 2001 and 2014: Richardson Hall, Harold D. Smith Hall, McCandless Hall and Keefe Hall.

Among former LWU administrators include the late Methodist clergyman and former Kentucky State Sen. Doug Moseley. Sen. Moseley also donated his personal library to the college's Clark Reading Room. A former trustee was the late Robert L. Miller, the mayor of Campbellsville from 1966 to 1998. The historian Betty Jane Gorin-Smith, before her retirement from education, taught occasional courses at Lindsey Wilson.

In August 2014, Lindsey Wilson launched several online programs with plans to add more in subsequent semesters.

In April 2025, the college announced that it would be changing its name from "Lindsey Wilson College" to Lindsey Wilson University on July 1 due to changing dynamics at the school and to provide clarity to international students.

== Campus ==
The 200 acre A.P. White Campus consists of 28 administrative buildings, 19 dormitories and apartment complexes, 12 athletic facilities, and 4 facilities for maintenance.

- The Roberta D. Cranmer Dining and Conference Center (1993) serves Lindsey Wilson students, faculty and staff. In addition, the dining and conference center is utilized by citizens and groups throughout south central Kentucky.
- A 10,000-square-foot addition to the Holloway Building, which houses the Katie Murrell Library, was opened in August 2002, doubling the size of library space.
- The W.W. Slider Humanities Center opened during the 1996‑97 school year. The center houses an arts center, classrooms and faculty offices, and it enhanced the region's cultural and artistic offerings.
- The John B. Begley Chapel (1997) was designed by architect E. Fay Jones, an American Institute of Architects Gold Medal recipient and disciple of Frank Lloyd Wright. The $2 million chapel was the first building placed on the LWC A.P. White Campus whose sole purpose was worship.
- The Walter S. Reuling Stadium (1998) is a European-style soccer field.
- Dr. Shilpan M. Patel Amphitheater (2003) includes a 150-seat amphitheater and park area.
- The Jim and Helen Lee Fugitte Science Center (2006) features eight laboratories and spacious study areas. The center is home to LWC's baccalaureate programs in biology, mathematics and psychophysiology.
- The Sumner Center for Campus Ministries (2005) and the Norma and Glen Hodge Center for Discipleship (2009) are home to the university's campus ministry program.
- The Lindsey Wilson Sports Park (2010) includes Blue Raider Stadium for football, and track and field; Egnew Park for baseball; and Marilyn D. Sparks Park for softball.
- The 73,232-square-foot Doris and Bob Holloway Health & Wellness Center (2010) amenities include an indoor, eight-lane swimming pool; recreation pool; indoor walking track; aerobic and dance studio; cardiovascular area/equipment; basketball and volleyball courts; and a weight-lifting room.
- Ten residence halls provide students a living-learning environment at Lindsey Wilson university: Henry and Mary Ellen Lilly Residence Hall (1996), Richardson Hall (2000), Harold J. Smith Hall (2010), Jerry and Kendrick McCandless Hall (2011), and Keefe Hall (2014).
- Dr. Robert and Carol Goodin Nursing and Counseling Center (2011) is a 27,100-square-foot, two-story building and is home to LWC's baccalaureate nursing program and features a state-of-the-art simulated hospital area which allows nursing students to prepare for real-life clinical experiences in a safe learning environment. It is also home to the School of Professional Counseling.
- The Pines at Lindsey Wilson (2009) is an 18-hole golf course located less than five miles from the A.P. White Campus, the Pines at Lindsey Wilson is open to members.
- The Blue Raider Band Building (2009) is home of the university's marching and concert bands.
- The six-court Henry Baughman Tennis Complex opened in fall 2010.

== Academics ==
Lindsey Wilson University offers a graduate certificate program in substance abuse counseling as well as six associate (A.A.) degrees, 21 bachelor's (B.A., B.S., and B.S.N.) degrees, two master's (M.B.A. and M.Ed.) degrees, and one doctoral (Ph.D.) degree.

=== Online and extended programs ===
Lindsey Wilson University was granted approval to offer distance education on August 25, 2010. The university offers programs using asynchronous technology where 50% or more of the credit hours are delivered online.

Lindsey Wilson University offers 50% or more of its credit hours for a diploma, certificate or degree at extended campus locations. The Bachelor of Arts (B.A.) in Human Services & Counseling and the Master of Education (M.Ed.) in Counseling & Human Development are offered at more than 20 sites throughout Kentucky, Tennessee, Ohio, Virginia and West Virginia

=== Service learning ===
The Lindsey Wilson Bonner Scholars Program served 24,719.25 total hours in the local community and received the 2018 Kentucky Governor's Service Award. Collectively, the LWC community logged more than 30,000 hours of service to the region.

The university holds its annual Malvina Farkle Day during the fall semester. Classes are cancelled for the day in order for students to perform community service at local businesses, non-profits and schools in the local community.

== Athletics ==
The Lindsey Wilson athletic teams are called the Blue Raiders. The university is a member of the National Association of Intercollegiate Athletics (NAIA), primarily competing in the Mid-South Conference (MSC) since the 2000–01 academic year. The Blue Raiders previously competed in the Kentucky Intercollegiate Athletic Conference (KIAC; now currently known as the River States Conference (RSC) since the 2016–17 school year) from 1984–85 to 1999–2000.

Lindsey Wilson competes in 25 intercollegiate varsity sports: Men's sports include baseball, basketball, bowling, cross country, football, golf, soccer, swimming, tennis, track and field and wrestling; while women's sports include basketball, bowling, cross country, dance, flag football, golf, soccer, softball, swimming, tennis, track and field and volleyball; and co-ed sports include archery, cheerleading and cycling.

=== Baseball ===
Started in 1987, Lindsey Wilson's baseball team boasts five NAIA All-American players and four honorable mentions.

=== Basketball ===
The men's basketball team has made eleven National Championship appearances in its history, and boasts three Mid-South Conference Championship wins in 2005, 2012, and 2013. In the 2012–2013 season, the men's basketball team reached the highest ranking in team history at number 3, won the regular season conference title, and hoisted a 26–4 record.

The men's head coach Paul Peck was awarded NAIA National Coach of the Year for his 2011–2012 season. Peck has also been named Mid-South Conference Coach of the Year five times in his career at Lindsey Wilson University. The men's team has produced ten NAIA All-American athletes, and five honorable mentions.

Since its start in 1987 Lindsey Wilson's women's basketball team has made ten National Championship appearances, and has won two Mid-South Conference Championship titles. In its history the women's team boasts seven NAIA All-Americans, and seven honorable mentions.

=== Cheerleading and dance ===
Lindsey Wilson's cheer team has produced multiple athletes who have earned Mid-South Conference Honors, and other have been named to the Mid-South All-Conference Cheerleading team.

In 2013 the Lindsey Wilson Dance team competed in their first NAIA East Regional Dance Championships and won their way to compete at the NAIA Invitational. Two of the dancers earned All-American bids during their performance. Damon Hicks coaches both the cheer and dance teams. Hicks is a certified coach by the American Association of Cheerleading Coaches & Administrators (AACCA) and is a certified tumbling coach by the United States Tumbling Association (USTA) and the Amateur Athletic Union (AAU).

=== Cycling ===
The cycling team won the National Cyclo-cross Championships in 2000 and 2001, and have accumulated another 15 individual national championships.

Finished in 2010, the Lindsey Wilson cycling team has its own BMX track a few miles outside the university's campus. The course offers multiple large jumps, a pair of straight-aways and a rhythm section, offering the university's cyclist a place to practice Also on the property is a competition dual slalom and downhill course.

Lindsey Wilson's cycling team has produced several notable athletes. 2014 Lindsey Wilson graduate athlete Danny Caluag competed at the 2012 London Olympics for the Philippines. He was the only active collegiate cyclist to compete at the London games In 2015, Caluag was named the Philippines Athlete of the Year by the Philippines Sportswriters Association (PSA).

Chase Hines represented Team USA at the 2011 world championships in Copenhagen, Denmark where he earned the UCI BMX World Championship.

Weston Pope captured three world titles over the course of two years. Pope won the UCI BMX men's 17–24 World Championship two consecutive years (2007 and 2008) and the BMX men's 17–24 Cruiser title at the 2008 world championships in British Columbia.

Tim Johnson won the U.S. cyclo-cross national championship on six occasions, and has been inducted into the Lindsey Wilson University Athletic Hall of Fame.

=== Cross-country ===
The Blue Raiders' men's cross-country team won first place in the regional championship in 1996, and the Mid-South Conference Championship in 2007. With over 35 total runners qualifying to compete in the NAIA National Championships. The men's team has produced seven NAIA All-American athletes. In 1997 Danny Wilcoxsen, who was coach at the time, was awarded the NAIA National Coach if the Year.

The women's team won the Mid-South Conference Championship in both 2006 and 2007. With over 35 total athletes qualifying to compete in the NAIA National Championships. The women's team has produced four NAIA All-Americans.

Past coaches Stu Melby (2000–2004) and Edwin Hagans (2005–2013) were each awarded Mid-South Conference Coach of the Year and Mid-South Conference Co-Coach of the Year.

=== Football ===
Lindsey Wilson had dropped football at the end of the 1935 season, but trustees voted to re-institute the football program in 2008. After a 75-year hiatus, the revived football team opened its season on September 4, 2010, as they played Notre Dame College (Ohio) at Blue Raider Stadium. Notre Dame defeated Lindsey Wilson, 14–10. The Blue Raiders closed their football season with an overall record of 5–6. In their 2011 season, the Lindsey Wilson University football team had a record of 7–3. The Lindsey Wilson University football team concluded its 2012 season with a record of 3–8. In just their 11th season since reviving the football program, the Blue Raiders won the NAIA 2020 National Championship (delayed until the spring of 2021 because of COVID-19).

=== Golf ===
The men's golf team has won one NAIA championship in 2025, three Regional Championships, and seven Mid-South Conference Regular Season Championships. And two athletes have been awarded NAIA Honorable Mention All-American.

Men's coach Jeff Lambert was named NAIA Region Coach of the Year in 2004 and 2006, and Mid-South Conference Coach of the Year in 2003 and 2014. Coach Chris Starks was awarded NAIA Region Coach of the Year in 2007.

The women's golf team has won Regional Championships, and seven Mid-South Conference Regular Season Championships. In 2007 Krista Burton became the first NAIA National Champion in the program's history. The team also boasts seven NAIA All-Americans, and eight NAIA Honorable Mentions.

Women's coach Chris Wells was named NAIA Region Coach of the Year in 2004, and then three consecutive years from 2006 to 2008. He was awarded Mid-South Conference Coach (or Co-Coach) of the year every season from 2006 to 2010. In 2012 Shaun Cozart was awarded Mid-South Conference Coach of the Year.

=== Soccer ===
The men's soccer team won the NAIA championship in 1995, 1996, 1998, 1999, 2000, 2001, 2005, 2009 and in 2011 with records of 23–0–0. They have also won a total of twelve Mid-South Conference Championships. The team boasts a whopping 68 NAIA All-Americans and 23 Honorable Mentions. With 43 players making the NAIA National Tournament Team, and eight being awarded NAIA National Tournament MVP.

Men's coach, Ray Wells, has received eight NAIA National Coach of the Year awards, and six NAIA Region Coach of the Year awards

The women's soccer team won the 2004, 2006, 2012 and 2014 NAIA championship titles, and fifteen Mid-South Conference Championships. In its history, the women's team has produced two NAIA National Player of the Year recipients, 58 NAIA All-Americans, and 37 Honorable Mentions. The team has seen 32 of its athletes selected for the NAIA All National Tournament Team, with four being awarded as NAIA National Tournament MVP.

Women's coach, Willis Pooler was twice awarded Mid-South Conference Coach of the Year, once NAIA Region Coach of the Year before he went on to become Lindsey Wilson's athletic director. His predecessor, Coach Drew Burwash, received Mid-South Conference Coach (or Co-Coach) of the Year a total of seven times, and NAIA Region Coach of the Year three times.

=== Softball ===
The Blue Raiders have won a total of five Mid-South Conference Championships in softball. With eight athletes awarded NAIA All-American and five Honorable Mentions.

=== Swimming ===
Swimming was added to Lindsey Wilson's athletic program in the fall of 2009. Since then two men and one woman's athlete have been named NAIA All-American.

Alicia Kemnitz was awarded Mid-South Conference Coach of the Year for the 2014–2015 season.

=== Tennis ===
The men's tennis team has won eleven Mid-South Conference Championships, with twenty athletes named NAIA All-American, and five Honorable Mentions.

The women's team has won eleven Mid-South Conference Championships, with twenty-two athletes awarded NAIA All-American, and six Honorable Mentions.

=== Track and field ===
The Blue Raider Track and Field team participates in both indoor and outdoor seasons.

Men's team won the Outdoor Mid-South Conference Championship in 2015. The men's team also boasts thirty-three NAIA Indoor All-Americans and twenty-two NAIA Outdoor All-Americans.

The women won the Outdoor Mid-south Conference Championship in 2014. The women's team has produced sixteen Indoor NAIA All-Americans and eleven Outdoor NAIA All-Americans. In 2005 Anine Stanley earned the national championship in the 3,000-meter Race Walk.

=== Volleyball ===
The Blue Raider volleyball team has won three Mid-South Conference Championships, with five women awarded NAIA All-American, and six Honorable Mentions. The team also won the 2017 NAIA National Championship defeating Dordt College in four sets.

Volleyball coach Andy Cavins, was awarded Mid-South Conference Coach of the Year in 2014 and 2015.

=== Wrestling ===
Wrestling was added to Lindsey Wilson's athletic program in the fall of 2009. The wrestling team finished second in the NAIA national championship in the 2016 season. The team is currently coached by Jameel Bryant who won 2 Individual NAIA National Championships while he was an athlete at Lindsey.

== Alumni ==
Since its founding in 1903, the university has had several notable alumni:

- Walter Arnold Baker, state legislator and member of the Kentucky Supreme Court
- Cameron Dukes, professional football player
- Albert Edward, professional soccer player
- Shaun Francis, professional soccer player
- Tim Johnson, professional racing cyclist
- Lebogang Moloto, professional soccer player
- Nathan Opoku, professional soccer player
- Ty Shipalane, professional soccer player
