= Kentucky Route 92 =

State highway in Kentucky, USA

Kentucky Route 92
- KY 92 highlighted in red

Route information
- Maintained by KYTC
- Length: 112.485 mi (181.027 km)
- Existed: 1929–present

Western segment
- Length: 17.221 mi (27.715 km)
- West end: KY 55 near Joppa
- Major intersections: US 127 near Jamestown US 127 Bus. in Jamestown
- East end: Dead end on Lake Cumberland

Eastern segment
- Length: 95.264 mi (153.313 km)
- West end: Boat ramp on Lake Cumberland
- Major intersections: KY 90 in Monticello US 27 in Stearns; I-75 in Williamsburg US 25W in Williamsburg
- East end: US 25E near Fourmile

Location
- Country: United States
- State: Kentucky
- Counties: Adair, Russell, Bell, Whitley, McCreary, Wayne

Highway system
- Kentucky State Highway System; Interstate; US; State; Parkways
| ← KY 91 | → KY 93 |

Kentucky Route 92 (KY 92) is a 112.485-mile-long (181.027 km) state highway Kentucky. The route is split into two segments by Lake Cumberland and is one of a few state routes in Kentucky with two discontinuous segments on both sides of a body of water. The western segment, which is 17.221-mile-long (27.715 km), runs from Kentucky Route 55 west of Joppa to a dead end on Lake Cumberland south of Jamestown via Joppa, Montpelier, Esto, and Jamestown. The eastern segment, which is 95.264-mile-long (153.313 km), runs from a boat ramp on Lake Cumberland northwest of Monticello to U.S. Route 25E west of Fourmile via Monticello, Barrier, Stearns, Carpenter, Timsley, and Ingram.

The building of Wolf Creek Dam and the subsequent creation of Lake Cumberland divided the two portions of the road, as it did several other state highways in this portion of the state.

== Route description ==
=== Western segment ===
In Adair County, KY 92 begins at a junction with KY 55 just southeast of Columbia. KY 92 goes into an east-southeasterly path into Russell County, and enters the city of Jamestown. it crosses US 127 outside of town, and runs concurrently with US 127 Business within city limits up to the Russell County Courthouse. KY 92 continues southeastward to a boat ramp on the shore of Lake Cumberland. This segment runs for a total of 17.221 miles (27.715 km).

=== Eastern segment ===
KY 92 resumes at a dead end on the Beaver Creek shore of Lake Cumberland in western Wayne County. it then goes through the city of Monticello, and then goes further southeast into McCreary County and into the Daniel Boone National Forest. The route provides road access to portions of the Big South Fork National River and Recreation Area before reaching Stearns. it runs concurrently with US 27 for a few miles. KY 92 then turns eastward to go into Whitley County, where it provides access to Interstate 75 and U.S. Route 25W at Williamsburg. KY 92 goes further east, almost running into Knox County, but instead crosses into Bell County and meets its eastern terminus at U.S. Route 25E just northwest of Pineville. This segment runs for 95.264 miles (153.313 km).

== History ==
Route 92 roughly follows an old railroad bed on its eastern approach to Williamsburg. The communities of Siler, Packard, Gausdale, Nevisdale and Gatliff all are along the route between the Bell County line and Williamsburg. All of these communities were originally mining and or timber camps. In the timber years logs were floated down the Cumberland River which runs along the route to Williamsburg where they were picked up and sawed into lumber in mills. When the timber companies converted to coal production in the 1900s, railroads replaced the river in getting the product to market and as the truck began to invade the train's territory Route 92 took shape.

=== Relocation project ===
A particularly curvy section of Route 92 was replaced by a new road in November 2009 . Milepoints 4 to 11 in western Whitley County were superseded by the new road, which is designated Route 92. Portions of the old road that remain in service have been re-designated Route 2792, although maintenance is neglected and portions of the road are a danger to the general public. The project, begun in 2003, was completed by the Kentucky Transportation Cabinet with the aid of the American Recovery and Reinvestment Act of 2009. The project will eventually replace the road all the way to U.S. Route 27 in McCreary County. In 2012, the second phase was completed that relocated a new portion from U.S. Route 27 to Kentucky 592 on the western end of the project area. The final middle section is expected to be completed by 2015.

== Major intersections ==
=== Western segment ===
| County | Location | mi | km | Destinations | Notes |
|---|---|---|---|---|---|
| Adair | | 0.000 | 0.000 | KY 55 | Western terminus |
| Adair | | 3.980 | 6.405 | KY 768 west | Eastern terminus of KY 768 |
| Russell | | 5.864 | 9.437 | KY 619 east | Western terminus of KY 619 |
| Russell | | 8.917 | 14.351 | KY 379 | |
| Russell | | 11.558 | 18.601 | US 127 | |
| Russell | Jamestown | 12.437 | 20.015 | US 127 Bus. north (North Main Street) / Clayton Road | West end of US 127 Bus. overlap |
| Russell | Jamestown | 12.962– 12.976 | 20.860– 20.883 | US 127 Bus. south / KY 619 (Cumberland Avenue) | East end of US 127 Bus. overlap |
| Russell | | 17.221 | 27.715 | Dead end | Eastern terminus; on Lake Cumberland |
1.000 mi = 1.609 km; 1.000 km = 0.621 mi: Concurrency terminus

=== Eastern segment ===
| County | Location | mi | km | Destinations | Notes |
|---|---|---|---|---|---|
| Wayne | | 0.000 | 0.000 | End of state maintenance | Western terminus; boat ramp on Lake Cumberland |
| Wayne | | 1.997 | 3.214 | KY 674 west | Eastern terminus of KY 674 |
| Wayne | | 4.830 | 7.773 | KY 1720 north | Southern terminus of KY 1720 |
| Wayne | | 6.068 | 9.765 | KY 789 north | Southern terminus of KY 789 |
| Wayne | | 6.340 | 10.203 | KY 3284 south | Northern terminus of KY 3284 |
| Wayne | | 6.923 | 11.141 | KY 833 north | Southern terminus of KY 833 |
| Wayne | Monticello | 7.536 | 12.128 | KY 90 | |
| Wayne | Monticello | 8.922 | 14.359 | KY 90 Bus. west (South Main Street) / Columbia Avenue | West end of KY 90 Bus. overlap |
| Wayne | Monticello | 8.985 | 14.460 | KY 90 Bus. east (North Main Street) / Court Street | East end of KY 90 Bus. overlap |
| Wayne | | 11.358 | 18.279 | KY 776 east | Western terminus of KY 776 |
| Wayne | | 12.448 | 20.033 | KY 1258 south | Northern terminus of KY 1258 |
| Wayne | Barrier | 16.080 | 25.878 | KY 1479 south | Northern terminus of KY 1479 |
| Wayne | | 19.189 | 30.882 | KY 1756 south | Northern terminus of KY 1756 |
| Wayne | | 21.738 | 34.984 | KY 3286 east (Kidd Crossing-Ritner Road) | Western terminus of KY 3286 |
| McCreary | | 32.305 | 51.990 | KY 1363 west | Eastern terminus of KY 1363 |
| McCreary | | 35.795 | 57.606 | KY 791 south (Worley Road) | Northern terminus of KY 791 |
| McCreary | Stearns | 36.493 | 58.730 | KY 701 north (Poplar Springs Road) | Southern terminus of KY 701 |
| McCreary | Stearns | 36.865 | 59.328 | KY 3259 east (Winchester Road) | Western terminus of KY 3259 |
| McCreary | Stearns | 37.551 | 60.432 | KY 1651 south | West end of KY 1651 overlap |
| McCreary | Stearns | 37.726 | 60.714 | KY 1651 north | East end of KY 1651 overlap |
| McCreary | Stearns | 38.802 | 62.446 | US 27 north | West end of US 27 overlap |
| McCreary | Stearns | 39.570 | 63.682 | KY 1567 south (Valley Road) / Pigskin Road | Northern terminus of KY 1567 |
| McCreary | Pine Knot | 41.953 | 67.517 | KY 2792 east / KY 1651 north (Old U.S. 27) | Western terminus of KY 2792; southern terminus of KY 1651 |
| McCreary | Pine Knot | 42.273 | 68.032 | US 27 south | East end of US 27 overlap |
| McCreary | | 42.672 | 68.674 | KY 3252 south | Northern terminus of KY 3252 |
| McCreary | | 43.128 | 69.408 | KY 592 east / Bob Musgrove Road | Western terminus of KY 592 |
| McCreary | | 46.193 | 74.340 | KY 2792 west | Eastern terminus of KY 2792 |
| McCreary | | 46.271 | 74.466 | KY 592 west | Eastern terminus of KY 592 |
| McCreary | | 47.825 | 76.967 | KY 1470 west (Osborn Creek Road) | Eastern terminus of KY 1470 |
| McCreary | | 48.976 | 78.819 | KY 1044 west | Eastern terminus of KY 1044 |
| Whitley | | 50.747 | 81.669 | KY 1673 north | Southern terminus of KY 1673 |
| Whitley | | 55.102 | 88.678 | KY 2792 east | Western terminus of KY 2792 |
| Whitley | | 58.441 | 94.052 | KY 2792 | |
| Whitley | | 59.892 | 96.387 | KY 2792 west | Eastern terminus of KY 2792 |
| Whitley | | 59.947 | 96.475 | KY 296 east | Western terminus of KY 296 |
| Whitley | Williamsburg | 61.082– 61.116 | 98.302– 98.357 | I-75 – Lexington, Knoxville | I-75 exit 11 |
| Whitley | Williamsburg | 61.232 | 98.543 | KY 2386 north (South 10th Street) | Southern terminus of KY 2386 |
| Whitley | Williamsburg | 61.430 | 98.862 | US 25W south | West end of US 25W overlap |
| Whitley | Williamsburg | 62.040 | 99.844 | US 25W north (Cumberland Falls Highway) | East end of US 25W overlap |
| Whitley | | 67.289 | 108.291 | KY 904 east | Western terminus of KY 904 |
| Whitley | | 71.994 | 115.863 | KY 1064 (Louden Road / Whetstone Road) | |
| Whitley | | 75.381 | 121.314 | KY 11 north | Southern terminus of KY 11 |
| Whitley | | 77.480 | 124.692 | KY 1809 north | Southern terminus of KY 1809 |
| Whitley | | 78.702 | 126.659 | KY 904 west | Eastern terminus of KY 904 |
| Whitley | | 79.682 | 128.236 | KY 1595 south (Pearl-Siler Road) | Northern terminus of KY 1595 |
| Bell | | 87.698 | 141.136 | KY 225 north | Southern terminus of KY 225 |
| Bell | | 91.555 | 147.343 | KY 2398 east | Western terminus of KY 2398 |
| Bell | | 9.669 | 15.561 | KY 2077 west (East Jellico Road) | Eastern terminus of KY 2077 |
| Bell | | 94.864 | 152.669 | KY 3085 north | West end of KY 3085 overlap |
| Bell | | 95.039 | 152.950 | KY 3085 south | East end of KY 3085 overlap |
| Bell | | 95.264 | 153.313 | US 25E | Eastern terminus |
1.000 mi = 1.609 km; 1.000 km = 0.621 mi: Concurrency terminus
