= Kentucky Route 2386 =

State highway in Kentucky, United States

Kentucky Route 2386
- South 10th Street
- KY 2386 highlighted in red

Route information
- Maintained by KYTC
- Length: 0.776 mi (1,249 m)
- Existed: c. 1981–present

Major junctions
- South end: KY 92 in Williamsburg
- North end: KY 296 in Williamsburg

Location
- Country: United States
- State: Kentucky
- Counties: Whitley

Highway system
- Kentucky State Highway System; Interstate; US; State; Parkways
← KY 2385	→ KY 2387

Kentucky Route 2386 (KY 2386) is a state highway in the city of Williamsburg in Whitley County, Kentucky. The highway runs 0.776 miles (1.249 km) along South 10th Street from KY 92 north to KY 296. KY 2386 connects Interstate 75 (I-75) and U.S. Route 25W (US 25W) with the University of the Cumberlands. The highway was established by 1981.

== Route description ==
KY 2836 begins at KY 92 between that highway's single-point urban interchange with I-75 and its junction with US 25W. The highway heads north along South 10th Street, which passes the Cumberland Inn & Museum south of Brier Creek, which flows into the Cumberland River to the east. North of the creek, KY 2836 passes by the University of the Cumberlands athletic facilities. The highway reaches its northern terminus at KY 296 (Main Street) next to the historic J.B. Gatliff House and southwest of the main university campus and downtown Williamsburg. The Kentucky Transportation Cabinet classifies KY 2386 as a state secondary highway.

== History ==
The Kentucky Transportation Cabinet transferred KY 2386 from its unclassified system to the rural secondary system through an October 14, 1981, official order. However, the route may have been assigned to South 10th Street before that 1981 action. The agency reclassified KY 2386 as a state secondary highway via a February 21, 2011 official order. KY 2386's length was reduced slightly after the reconstruction of the highway through the university athletic area in 2016.

== Major intersections ==
The entire route is in Williamsburg, Whitley County.

mi	km	Destinations	Notes
0.000	0.000	KY 92 to I-75 / US 25W	Southern terminus
0.776	1.249	KY 296 (Main Street)	Northern terminus
1.000 mi = 1.609 km; 1.000 km = 0.621 mi
