= 2013 NAIA football season =

American college football season

- National Championship: Barron Stadium; Rome, GA; December 21, 2013
- Champion: Grand View
- Player of the Year: Kyle Schuck (wide receiver, Morningside)

The 2013 NAIA football season was the component of the 2013 college football season organized by the National Association of Intercollegiate Athletics (NAIA) in the United States. The season's playoffs, known as the NAIA Football National Championship, culminated with the championship game on December 21, at Barron Stadium in Rome, Georgia. The Grand View Vikings defeated the Cumberlands Patriots, 35–23, in the title game to win the program's first NAIA championship.

== Conference standings ==
2013 Central States Football League standings
	Conf.			Overall
Team	W		L	W		L
No. 22 Langston $*	5	–	0	6	–	4
SAGU	4	–	1	6	–	4
Bacone	3	–	2	7	–	4
Oklahoma Baptist	2	–	3	3	–	8
Texas College	1	–	4	1	–	9
Wayland Baptist	0	–	5	0	–	10
$ – Conference champion; * – Langston later forfeited three wins.; Rankings from NAIA Coaches' Poll

2013 Frontier Conference football standings
	Conf.			Overall
Team	W		L	W		L
No. 3 Carroll (MT) $^	9	–	1	12	–	2
No. 11 Rocky Mountain ^	7	–	3	8	–	4
Southern Oregon	7	–	3	7	–	4
No. 25 Eastern Oregon	6	–	4	6	–	5
Montana Western	4	–	6	4	–	6
Montana State–Northern	4	–	6	4	–	6
Montana Tech	3	–	7	3	–	7
Dickinson State	0	–	10	1	–	10
$ – Conference champion; ^ – NAIA playoff participant; Rankings from NAIA Coaches' Poll

2013 Great Plains Athletic Conference football standings
	Conf.			Overall
Team	W		L	W		L
No. 4 Morningside $^	8	–	1	11	–	2
No. 20 Dakota Wesleyan	7	–	2	8	–	3
No. 13 Northwestern (IA) ^	7	–	2	8	–	3
Nebraska Wesleyan	6	–	3	6	–	4
Concordia (NE)	5	–	4	7	–	4
Doane	5	–	4	5	–	5
Midland	3	–	6	4	–	6
Briar Cliff	3	–	6	4	–	7
Hastings	1	–	8	2	–	8
Dordt	0	–	9	2	–	9
$ – Conference champion; ^ – NAIA playoff participant; Rankings from NAIA Coaches' Poll

2013 Heart of America Athletic Conference football standings
	Conf.			Overall
Team	W		L	W		L
No. 5 Baker +^	8	–	1	11	–	2
No. 11 Benedictine (KS) +^	8	–	1	10	–	2
No. 7 Missouri Valley +^	8	–	1	9	–	3
No. 23 Peru State	5	–	4	7	–	4
MidAmerica Nazarene	5	–	4	5	–	5
Evangel	4	–	5	4	–	6
Central Methodist	3	–	6	4	–	7
Avila	2	–	7	4	–	7
Culver–Stockton	2	–	7	2	–	9
Graceland	0	–	9	1	–	10
+ – Conference co-champions; ^ – NAIA playoff participant; Rankings from NAIA Coaches' Poll

2013 Kansas Collegiate Athletic Conference football standings
	Conf.			Overall
Team	W		L	W		L
No. 14 Sterling $^	8	–	1	9	–	3
No. 8 Tabor ^	7	–	2	10	–	3
No. 17 Friends	7	–	2	8	–	3
No. 15 Ottawa ^	7	–	2	8	–	4
McPherson	4	–	5	5	–	6
Southwestern (KS)	4	–	5	5	–	6
Kansas Wesleyan	3	–	6	4	–	7
Saint Mary (KS)	3	–	6	4	–	7
Bethany (KS)	1	–	8	2	–	9
Bethel (KS)	1	–	8	2	–	9
$ – Conference champion; ^ – NAIA playoff participant; Rankings from NAIA Coaches' Poll

2013 Mid-South Conference football standings
	Conf.			Overall
Team	W		L	W		L
East Division
No. 2 Cumberlands (KY) x^	6	–	0	13	–	1
No. 12 Georgetown (KY) ^	5	–	1	7	–	4
No. 19 Lindsey Wilson	3	–	3	8	–	3
Pikeville	3	–	3	7	–	4
Kentucky Christian	2	–	4	3	–	8
Union (KY)	2	–	4	3	–	8
Bluefield	0	–	6	0	–	11
West Division
No. 10 Faulkner x^	4	–	1	9	–	3
Reinhardt x	4	–	1	6	–	4
No. 23 Cumberland (TN)	3	–	2	7	–	4
Campbellsville	3	–	2	4	–	6
Belhaven	1	–	4	3	–	8
Bethel (TN)	0	–	5	2	–	9
x – Division champion/co-champions; ^ – NAIA playoff participant; Rankings from NAIA Coaches' Poll

2013 Mid-States Football Association standings
	Conf.			Overall
Team	W		L	W		L
Mideast League
No. 6 St. Francis (IN) x^	5	–	1	9	–	3
No. 21 St. Francis (IL)	4	–	2	7	–	4
Marian (IN)	4	–	2	6	–	5
Robert Morris (IL)	3	–	3	7	–	4
Taylor	3	–	3	5	–	5
Siena Heights	2	–	4	5	–	5
Concordia (MI)	0	–	6	1	–	9
Midwest League
No. 1 Grand View x^	6	–	0	14	–	0
No. 16 St. Ambrose ^	5	–	1	7	–	4
No. 18 Saint Xavier	4	–	2	7	–	4
William Penn	3	–	3	5	–	6
Trinity International	2	–	4	5	–	5
Olivet Nazarene	1	–	5	3	–	8
Waldorf	0	–	6	1	–	10
x – League champion/co-champions ^ – NAIA playoff participant; Rankings from NAIA Coaches' Poll

2013 North Star Athletic Association football standings
	Conf.			Overall
Team	W		L	W		L
Valley City State +	3	–	1	5	–	5
Jamestown +	3	–	1	3	–	7
Mayville State	2	–	2	7	–	4
Dakota State	2	–	2	3	–	8
Presentation	0	–	4	5	–	5
+ – Conference co-champions

2013 NAIA independents football records
	Conf.			Overall
Team	W		L	W		L
Ave Maria		–		8	–	2
Menlo		–		5	–	5
Webber International		–		5	–	5
Lindenwood–Belleville		–		4	–	7
Point		–		3	–	7
Edward Waters		–		2	–	9
Haskell		–		1	–	7
Warner		–		1	–	10
