= Hal Rogers =

American politician (born 1937)

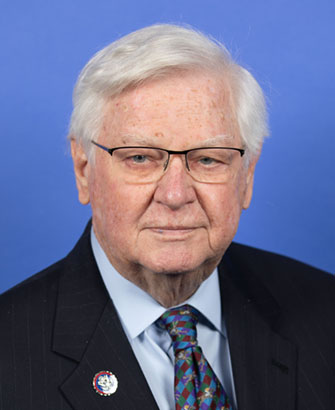
- Official portrait, 2022

46th Dean of the United States House of Representatives
- Incumbent
- Assumed office March 18, 2022
- Preceded by: Don Young

Chair of the House Appropriations Committee
- In office January 3, 2011 – January 3, 2017
- Preceded by: Dave Obey
- Succeeded by: Rodney Frelinghuysen

Member of the U.S. House of Representatives from Kentucky's 5th district
- Incumbent
- Assumed office January 3, 1981
- Preceded by: Tim Lee Carter

Commonwealth's Attorney of the 28th Kentucky Circuit Court
- In office September 12, 1969 – January 3, 1981
- Preceded by: Charles Neikirk
- Succeeded by: Lester Burns

Personal details
- Born: Harold Dallas Rogers; December 31, 1937 (age 88) Barrier, Kentucky, U.S.
- Party: Republican
- Spouses: Shirley McDowell (m. 1958; died 1995); Cynthia Doyle (m. 1999)
- Children: 3
- Education: Western Kentucky University (attended); University of Kentucky (BA, LLB)
- Website: House website Campaign website

Military service
- Branch/service: United States Army
- Years of service: 1956–1963
- Rank: Staff Sergeant
- Unit: Kentucky Army National Guard; North Carolina Army National Guard
- Rogers's voice Rogers on the conference report for the 2006 Department of Homeland Security Appropriations Act. Recorded October 6, 2005

Harold Dallas Rogers (born December 31, 1937) is an American lawyer and politician serving as the U.S. representative for Kentucky's 5th congressional district since 1981. He is a member of the Republican Party. Upon Don Young's death in 2022, Rogers became the dean of the House of Representatives.

Born in Barrier, Kentucky, Rogers graduated from the University of Kentucky with a Bachelor of Arts and Bachelor of Laws degree. He entered private practice after serving in the National Guard for the states of Kentucky and North Carolina. In 1969, he became the commonwealth's attorney for the counties of Pulaski and Rockcastle, an office he would hold until his election to Congress. In 1979, he was the Republican nominee for lieutenant governor.

After incumbent U.S. representative Tim Lee Carter announced his retirement in 1980, Rogers launched a campaign for Kentucky's 5th congressional district. He won the primary with a plurality of the vote and went on to easily win the general election. As his district is considered a Republican stronghold, Rogers has won reelection with over 65% of the vote in every election since 1980, with the sole exception of 1992. He is serving his 23rd term in Congress.

== Early life and education ==
Rogers was born in Barrier, Kentucky. After attending Western Kentucky University in Bowling Green, he earned a Bachelor of Arts and Bachelor of Laws from the University of Kentucky. Rogers served in the Kentucky Army National Guard and North Carolina Army National Guard.

== Early career ==
As a lawyer, Rogers was in private practice and was elected to serve as commonwealth's attorney for Pulaski and Rockcastle counties in Kentucky, an office he held from 1969 to his election to Congress in 1980.

Rogers was the Republican nominee for lieutenant governor of Kentucky in 1979. He lost to Democratic nominee Martha Layne Collins 63%–37%. The following year, Rogers won election to Congress.

== U.S. House of Representatives ==
=== Elections ===
In 1980, incumbent Republican U.S. congressman Tim Lee Carter of Kentucky's 5th congressional district decided to retire. Rogers won the Republican primary with a plurality of 23 percent. The losing candidates included the 1971 gubernatorial nominee, Tom Emberton. He won the general election with 67% of the vote. He has won reelection with at least 65% of the vote since then, except in 1992, when he defeated Democratic candidate John Doug Hays, a former member of the Kentucky State Senate, with 55% of the vote to Hays's 45% of the vote.

=== Tenure ===
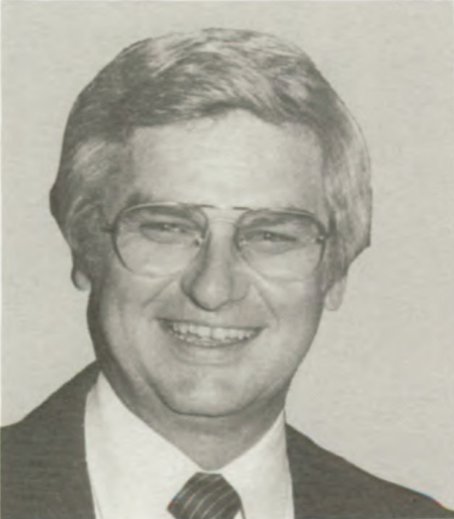
Rogers during the 97th Congress

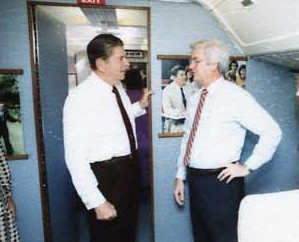
Rogers meeting with President Ronald Reagan

Rogers is the longest-serving Kentucky Republican ever elected to federal office. He represents one of the few ancestrally Republican districts south of the Ohio River. South-central Kentucky, historically the heart of the district, is very similar demographically to East Tennessee. Its voters identified with the Republicans after the Civil War and have supported the GOP ever since. Rogers served as a delegate to nine Republican National Conventions from 1976 to 2008.

The Center for Rural Development––a 501c(3) nonprofit organization established in Somerset, Kentucky, in March 1996––was Rogers's idea.

In 2001, the City of Williamsburg, Kentucky named their new water park and miniature-golf facility the Hal Rogers Family Entertainment Center as a "thank-you for the federal money he has brought back to Whitley County, the City of Williamsburg, and the other 40 counties he represents".

On the House/Senate conference decision to bolster the Department of Commerce and support the Clinton Administration's priorities, President Clinton remarked, "I commend the congressional leadership, Senator Ernest Hollings, Senator Pete Domenici, Congressman Neal Smith, and Congressman Harold Rogers, for their foresight and support in revitalizing this country through these programs. It is a dramatic step forward for the United States toward a solid economic future."

Kentucky state biographer Amy Witherbee commented: "Rogers's multiple roles on the Appropriations Committee have honed his skills as a bipartisan negotiator, and his economically challenged district often prompts him to stray from hard-line conservative stances. Although voting with his party against raising environmental standards on sports utility vehicles and against a controversial amendment that would have prohibited oil drilling in the Arctic National Wildlife Refuge, Rogers has been the creator and leading proponent of large environmental protection and clean-up programs throughout the Appalachian region. ... [His] reluctance to involve the federal government in local issues has not deterred him from supporting a multitude of economic development programs aimed at creating new job bases in economically disadvantaged areas, and particularly in Appalachia. In 1993, Rogers was one of only three Republicans to vote for then-President Bill Clinton's economic stimulus package. In March 2003, Rogers's ability to work through the bipartisan tangles of the Appropriations Committee won him the chairmanship on the subcommittee designated to control funding for the new Department of Homeland Security."

Ready evidence is found on March 20, 2008, when the invitation to testify in support of environmental legislation by Democratic House Majority Leader Rocky Adkins, and, on the same day, a rare invitation to speak from the Senate floor was afforded by Republican Senate majority leader David L. Williams of Cumberland County as part of the Senate's unanimously passed bipartisan resolution honoring Rogers for his service.

Rogers called a bill to reduce funding for law enforcement "the result of this new Republican majority's commitment to bring about real change in the way Washington spends the people's money".

In 2011, Rogers voted for the National Defense Authorization Act for Fiscal Year 2012, which included a controversial provision that allowed the government and the military to indefinitely detain American citizens and others without trial.

In December, 2017 Rogers voted for the Tax Cuts and Jobs Act of 2017.

Rogers, along with all other congressional Republicans, voted against the American Rescue Plan Act of 2021.

Following Grace Napolitano's retirement in 2024, Rogers became the oldest voting member of the House (Washington, D.C.; only delegate Eleanor Holmes Norton, who cannot vote on the House floor, is older).

In November 2025, Rogers used social media to publicize the disappearance of Rockcastle County teenager Wynter Wagoner after her family contacted his office for help finding her.

=== Allegations of pork-barrel appropriations ===
On May 14, 2006, The New York Times reported that Rogers had used his legislative position, as chair of the House subcommittee that controls the Homeland Security budget, to create "jobs in his home district and profits for companies that are donors to his political causes". The Lexington Herald-Leader in 2005 called Rogers the "Prince of Pork". The Times article reported that Rogers had inserted language ("existing government card issuance centers") into appropriations bills that effectively pushed the federal government into testing – at a cost of $4 million – older, inappropriate technology for a new fraud-resistant green card for permanent legal immigrants, at a production plant in Corbin, Kentucky, within Rogers's district. The study concluded that the smart card approach was far superior. The New York Times found that Rogers had received about $100,000 in contributions from parties with at least some ties to the identification card effort.

In response to these critics, Rogers said, "It should surprise no one that this article from Rolling Stone regarding my activity in connection with the Transportation Worker Identity Card (TWIC) is grossly incorrect, and highly slanderous ... A true and honest analysis would reveal that my sole interest in TWIC is simply to protect America's seaports, airports, and other transportation facilities from terrorist penetration. To purport that my actions have compromised national security in an effort to bring jobs to Kentucky or for personal gain is an absolute lie."

After Iran objected to the interim deployment of an Afloat Forward Staging Base to counter their threats to close the Persian Gulf, Rogers cut the funding for the project.

=== MilCon/VA Bill ===
On June 12, 2013, the White House threatened to veto the MilCon/VA spending bill because Republicans did not agree with the Senate's number of $1.058 trillion intended for military operations and research, after the MilCon/VA bill received 421 bipartisan votes in House. "We're marking up to $967 billion, the top line under current law," said Rogers, as chair of United States House Committee on Appropriations.

=== Legislation ===
On January 15, 2013, Rogers introduced H.R. 298, officially titled "To direct the Secretary of the Interior to conduct a special resource study to evaluate the significance of the Mill Springs Battlefield located in Pulaski and Wayne Counties, Kentucky, and the feasibility of its inclusion in the National Park System, and for other purposes". The bill would direct the Secretary of the Interior to conduct a special resource study to evaluate the significance of the Mill Springs Battlefield in Kentucky (relating to the Battle of Mill Springs fought on January 19, 1862, in Pulaski and Wayne Counties during the Civil War) and the feasibility of its inclusion in the National Park System (NPS). Rogers said, "the Battle of Mill Springs is a source of great pride and interest to the people I serve." Rogers argued that the Battlefield was a "jewel" and would be "an excellent addition to the National Park Service".

On March 5, 2014, Rogers introduced the To provide for the costs of loan guarantees for Ukraine (H.R. 4152; 113th Congress) into the House. The bill would provide loan guarantees to Ukraine of up to $1 billion, part of the American response to the 2014 Russian military intervention in Ukraine. The bill passed in the House on March 6, 2014.

In 2014, Rogers's committee called for cuts in the National Nuclear Security Administration budget that cast doubt on the Navy's ability to provide an Ohio Replacement Submarine class.

On July 29, 2014, Rogers introduced the Making supplemental appropriations for the fiscal year ending September 30, 2014 (H.R. 5230; 113th Congress), a bill that would provide supplemental FY2014 appropriations to several federal agencies for expenses related to the rise in unaccompanied alien children and alien adults accompanied by an alien minor at the southwest border. The bill would also change the procedures for screening and processing unaccompanied alien children who arrive at the border from certain countries. The bill would provide $659 million in supplemental funding. Rogers urged members to pass the bill, arguing that "more and more immigrants will continue to flood across the border if you fail to act" because resources were running out.

=== Committee assignments ===
For the 118th Congress:

- Committee on Appropriations
  - Subcommittee on Commerce, Justice, Science, and Related Agencies (Chair)
  - Subcommittee on Defense
  - Subcommittee on State, Foreign Operations, and Related Programs

=== Caucus memberships ===
- Congressional Coal Caucus
- Congressional Prescription Drug Abuse Caucus (co-chair)
- United States Congressional International Conservation Caucus
- Sportsmen's Caucus
- Tennessee Valley Authority Caucus
- House Republican Steering Committee

== Political positions ==
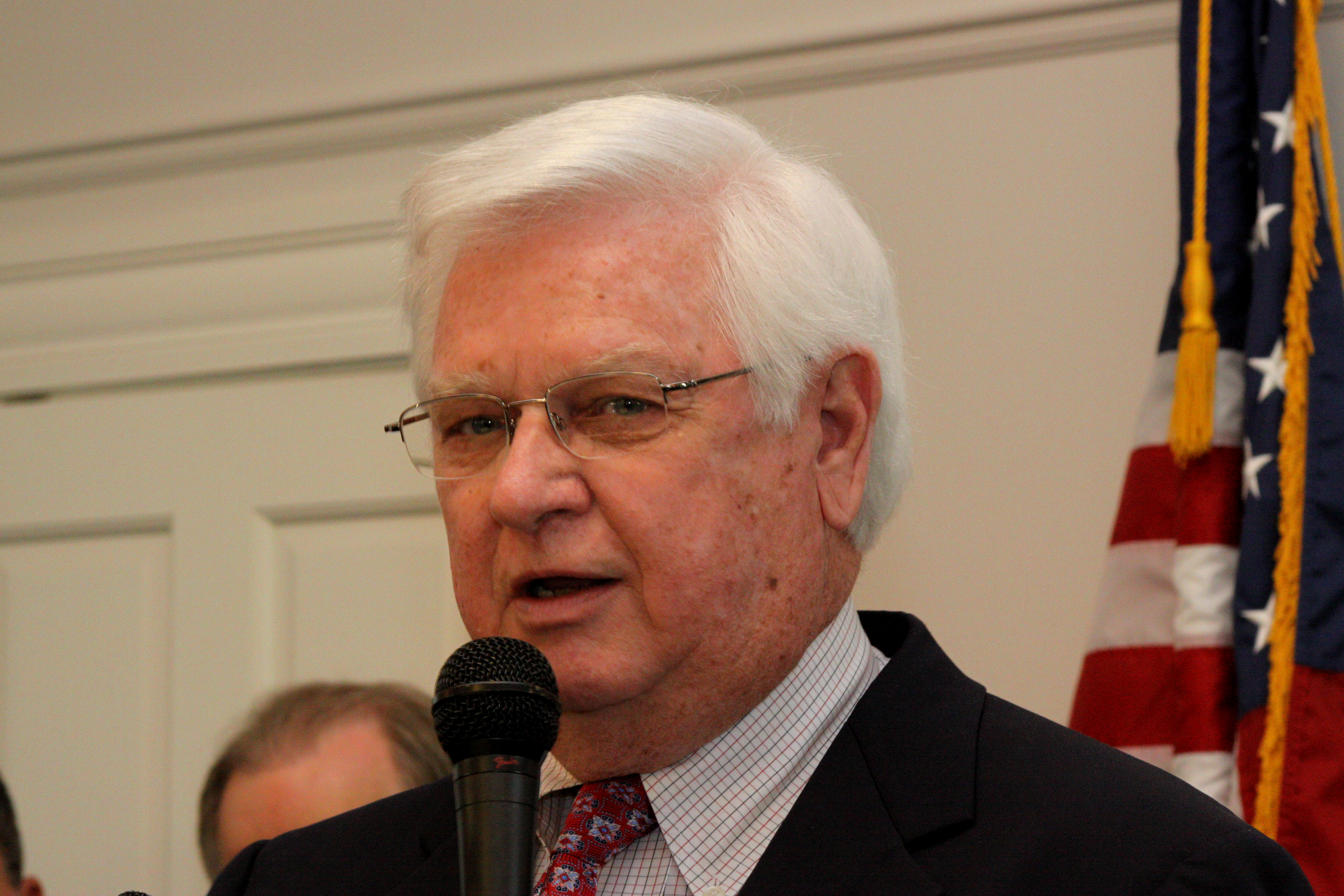
Rogers speaking at a 2010 Republican unity rally in Frankfort, Kentucky

Throughout his congressional tenure, Rogers has sometimes been regarded as a bipartisan negotiator, although his views are staunchly conservative. He is anti-abortion, scoring a 100 percent rating from the National Right to Life Committee, opposes LGBT rights, and supports a balanced budget amendment for the United States. Nonetheless, a FiveThirtyEight analysis of the voting records of members of the 118th Congress deemed him a moderate Republican, indicating unusually high support for bipartisan spending legislation and unusually low support for Republican "messaging" amendments. Currently in his 23rd term in Congress, Rogers is the longest-serving Republican from Kentucky ever elected to federal office.

=== Budget and economy ===
Rogers voted for the Economic Recovery Tax Act of 1981. The Act aimed to stimulate economic growth by significantly reducing income tax rates. It passed the House of Representatives in a 323–107 vote, the Senate via a voice vote, and it was signed into law by President Ronald Reagan on August 13, 1981. Rogers also voted for the Omnibus Budget Reconciliation Act of 1981. The Act decreased federal spending and increased military funding. It passed the House of Representatives in a 232–193 vote, the Senate via a voice vote, and it was signed into law by President Ronald Reagan the same day.

Rogers is in favor of dismantling the Home Affordable Modification Program. He opposed the GM and Chrysler bailout in 2009. He opposes regulating the subprime mortgage industry. He supports a balanced budget amendment.

=== Domestic issues ===
==== Gun control ====
In 2018, Rogers co-sponsored a bill to "strengthen school safety and security", which required a two-thirds vote for passage, given it was brought up under an expedited process. The House voted 407–10 to approve the bill, which would "provide $50 million a year for a new federal grant program to train students, teachers and law enforcement on how to spot and report signs of gun violence". Named STOP (Students, Teachers, and Officers Preventing) School Violence Act, it would "develop anonymous telephone and online systems where people could report threats of violence". At the same time, it would authorize $25 million for schools to improve and harden their security, such as installing new locks, lights, metal detectors and panic buttons. A separate spending bill would be required to provide money for the grant program.

==== Crime ====
Rogers supports expanding the juvenile-justice system, including renovating and hiring additional prosecutors. Rogers supports the death penalty.

==== Environment ====
Rogers has a 13 percent rating from the Humane Society for his anti-animal-welfare voting record.

==== Technology ====
Rogers is in favor of ending federal funding for National Public Radio. He opposes net neutrality.

=== International issues ===
==== Immigration ====
Rogers supports efforts to make the English language the official language of the United States. He supports building a fence along the Mexico–United States border.

==== Russian interference ====
In July 2018, while serving temporarily as chair of the House Rules committee, Rogers rejected requests to increase federal funding for election security. The U.S. intelligence community had concluded that Russia interfered in the 2016 election and that it was continuing to interfere in election systems as of July 2018.

=== Social issues ===
==== Abortion ====
Rogers is anti-abortion. He has a 100 percent rating from the National Right to Life Committee and a zero percent rating from NARAL Pro-Choice America for his abortion-related voting record. He is in favor of banning federal funding from supporting organizations that provide abortions, as well as federal health insurance covering abortions, unless the pregnancy is the result of rape, incest, or threatens the mother's life. He opposes embryonic-stem-cell research. He opposes human cloning.

==== Civil rights ====
Rogers has a 28 percent rating from the NAACP for his civil-rights voting record. He opposes affirmative action.

==== LGBT rights ====
Rogers has a 92 percent rating from the Christian Coalition for his socially conservative voting record. He has a zero percent rating from the Human Rights Campaign regarding his voting record on LGBT rights. Rogers opposes same-sex marriage. He opposes prohibiting job discrimination based on sexual orientation. He opposes single people and same-sex couples being allowed to adopt children. Rogers opposes classifying crimes motivated by the victim's sexual orientation as hate crimes.

=== Maritime law ===
Rogers voted against the Abandoned Shipwrecks Act of 1987. The Act asserts United States title to certain abandoned shipwrecks located on or embedded in submerged lands under state jurisdiction, and transfers title to the respective state, thereby empowering states to manage these cultural and historical resources more efficiently, with the goal of preventing treasure hunters and salvagers from damaging them. Despite his vote against it, President Ronald Reagan signed it into law on April 28, 1988.

== Personal life ==
Rogers had three children with his first wife, Shirley Rogers. She died of cancer in 1995. Rogers has since remarried, to Cynthia Doyle.

In January 2024, Rogers was involved in a car crash in the Washington, D.C., area. According to a statement released by his office, he was in "good condition” after he was admitted to a nearby hospital. By the next month, Rogers was expected to return to Capitol Hill and resume his duties.

== Electoral history ==
Kentucky's 5th congressional district: Results 1980–2024
Year	Republican	Votes	%	Democratic	Votes	%	Third Party	Party	Votes	%
1980	Hal Rogers	112,093	67%	Ted Marcum	54,027	33%				
1982	Hal Rogers	52,928	65%	Doye Davenport	28,285	35%				
1984	Hal Rogers	125,164	76%	Sherman McIntosh	39,783	24%				
1986	Hal Rogers	56,760	100%	No candidate						
1988	Hal Rogers	104,467	100%	No candidate						
1990	Hal Rogers	64,660	100%	No candidate						
1992	Hal Rogers	115,255	55%	John Hays	95,760	45%				
1994	Hal Rogers	82,291	79%	Walter Blevins	21,318	21%				
1996	Hal Rogers	117,842	100%	No candidate						
1998	Hal Rogers	142,215	78%	Sidney Jane Bailey	39,585	22%				
2000	Hal Rogers	145,980	74%	Sidney Jane Bailey	52,495	26%				
2002	Hal Rogers	137,986	78%	Sidney Jane Bailey	38,254	22%				
2004	Hal Rogers	177,579	100%	No candidate						
2006	Hal Rogers	147,201	74%	Kenneth Stepp	52,367	26%				
2008	Hal Rogers	177,024	84%	No candidate			Jim Holbert	Independent	33,444	16%
2010	Hal Rogers	151,019	77%	Jim Holbert	44,034	23%				
2012	Hal Rogers	195,408	78%	Kenneth Stepp	55,447	22%				
2014	Hal Rogers	171,350	78%	Kenneth Stepp	47,617	22%				
2016	Hal Rogers	221,242	100%	No candidate						
2018	Hal Rogers	172,093	78%	Kenneth Stepp	45,890	21%	Billy Ray Wilson	Independent	34	1%
2020	Hal Rogers	250,914	84%	Matthew Best	47,056	16%				
2022	Hal Rogers	177,714	82%	Conor Halbleib	38,549	18%				
2024	Hal Rogers	261,407	100%	No candidate						

Party political offices
Preceded by Shirley Palmer-Ball	Republican nominee for Lieutenant Governor of Kentucky; 1979	Succeeded by Eugene Stuart
U.S. House of Representatives
Preceded by Tim Carter	Member of the U.S. House of Representatives from Kentucky's 5th congressional district 1981–present	Incumbent
Preceded by Dave Obey	Chair of the House Appropriations Committee; 2011–2017	Succeeded by Rodney Frelinghuysen
Honorary titles
Preceded by Don Young	Dean of the United States House of Representatives; 2022–present	Incumbent
Preceded by Don Young	Most senior Republican in the U.S. House of Representatives; 2022–present	Incumbent
Preceded by Grace Napolitano	Oldest Member of the U.S. House of Representatives; Representative; 2025–present Served alongside: Eleanor Holmes Norton (Delegate)	Incumbent
U.S. order of precedence (ceremonial)
Preceded by Katherine Clark as House Minority Whip	Order of precedence of the United States	Succeeded by Chris Smith
First	Seniority in the U.S. House of Representatives; 1st	Succeeded by Chris Smith
