= Kentucky Route 296 =

Highway in Kentucky, United States

Kentucky Route 296
- KY 296 highlighted in red

Route information
- Maintained by KYTC
- Length: 2.075 mi (3.339 km)

Major junctions
- West end: KY 92 near Williamsburg
- East end: US 25W in Williamsburg

Location
- Country: United States
- State: Kentucky
- Counties: Whitley

Highway system
- Kentucky State Highway System; Interstate; US; State; Parkways
| ← KY 295 | → KY 297 |

Kentucky Route 296 (KY 296) is a 2.075-mile-long (3.339 km) state highway in Whitley County, Kentucky that runs from KY 92 immediately west of the Williamsburg city line to U.S. Route 25W (US 25W) on the east side of Williamsburg via Williamsburg.

== History ==
KY 296 was formed in the 1960s when KY 92 was rerouted to bypass Williamsburg.

The original KY 296 ran from KY 107 in La Fayette west via Canton Road and Red Diamond Road. This was removed by 1950 when Fort Campbell was extended to include most of the road, causing it to be closed off.

== Major intersections ==
The entire route is in Whitley County.

| Location | mi | km | Destinations | Notes |
|---|---|---|---|---|
| | 0.000 | 0.000 | KY 92 | Western terminus |
| | 0.114 | 0.183 | KY 3422 north (Becks Creek Road) | Southern terminus of KY 3422 |
| Williamsburg | 0.764 | 1.230 | KY 204 north (Red Bird Road) | Southern terminus of KY 204 |
| Williamsburg | 1.158 | 1.864 | KY 2386 south (South 10th Street) | Northern terminus of KY 2386 |
| Williamsburg | 2.075 | 3.339 | US 25W (Cumberland Falls Highway) | Eastern terminus |
1.000 mi = 1.609 km; 1.000 km = 0.621 mi
