= 2013 NAIA football national championship =

2013 Russell Athletic NAIA Football National Championship
Grand View Vikings	Cumberlands Patriots
(13–0)	(13–0)
35	23
Head coach: Mike Woodley	Head coach: John Bland
Coaches 2	Coaches 1
	1	2	3	4	Total
Grand View	14	7	0	14	35
Cumberlands	3	14	0	6	23
- Date: December 21, 2013
- Season: 2013
- Stadium: Barron Stadium
- Location: Rome, Georgia
- MVP: Derek Fulton, Grand View (Offense); Jason Gladfelder, Grand View (Defense)
- Attendance: 5,295

The 2013 NAIA football national championship was a four-round sixteen team tournament played between November 23 through December 21 of 2013. The tournament concluded on December 21 with a single game played as the 58th Annual Russell Athletic NAIA Football National Championship. The game matched two undefeated teams: #1 Cumberlands Patriots (13-0) against #2 Grand View Vikings.

The championship game was played at Barron Stadium in Rome, Georgia. A total of sixteen teams participated in the single-elimination tournament from across the country. Placement in the tournament was based on the final edition of the 2013 NAIA Coaches' Poll. This year's field included the top 16 teams from the final poll.

== Scoring summary ==
Scoring summary

Quarter	Time	Drive			Team	Scoring information	Score	
Quarter	Time	Plays	Yards	TOP	Team	Scoring information	Grand View Vikings	Cumberlands Patriots
1	11:49	8	60	1:03	Grand View Vikings	Keonte White 59-yard touchdown reception from Derek Fulton, Kody Wilkie kick Good	7	0
1	6:37	9	54	5:12	Cumberlands Patriots	22-yard field goal by Al Merrick	7	3
1	3:08	9	75	3:29	Grand View Vikings	Taylor Goebel 7-yard touchdown reception from Derek Fulton, Kody Wilkie kick Good	14	3
2	14:26	6	61	1:31	Grand View Vikings	Davion Hurst 2-yard touchdown reception from Derek Fulton, Kody Wilkie kick Good	21	3
2	11:32	8	77	2:54	Cumberlands Patriots	D'Angelo Jordan 45-yard touchdown run, Al Merrick kick Good	21	10
2	6:34	11	69	4:33	Cumberlands Patriots	Adam Craig 1-yard touchdown run, Al Merrick kick Good	21	17
4	12:44	3	27	1:17	Grand View Vikings	Brady Roland 4-yard touchdown reception from Derek Fulton, Kody Wilkie kick Good	28	17
4	7:28	10	63	5:16	Cumberlands Patriots	Adam Craig 1-yard touchdown run, 2-point Jonathan Morrell Rush Failed	28	23
4	4:53	5	56	2:35	Grand View Vikings	Derek Fulton 1-yard touchdown run, Kody Wilkie kick Good	35	23
"TOP" = time of possession. For other American football terms, see Glossary of American football.							Grand View Vikings	Cumberlands Patriots

== Tournament bracket ==
Round of 16
1	Cumberlands (KY) (10–0)	56
16	St. Ambrose (IA) (7–3)	28
6	Saint Francis (IN) (8–2)	20
9	Faulkner (AL) (9–2)	13
3	Carroll (MT) (10–1)	38
13(T)	Georgetown (KY) (7–3)	28
7	Missouri Valley (MO) (8–2)	38
12	Northwestern (IA) (8–2)	13
2	Grand View (IA) (10–0)	38
15	Ottawa (KS) (8–3)	13
8	Benedictine (KS) (10–1)	13
11	Tabor (KS) (9–2)	14
4	Baker (KS) (10–1)	10
13(T)	Sterling (KS) (9–2)	7
5	Morningside (IA) (9–1)	40
10	Rocky Mountain (MT) (8–3)	21

Quarterfinals
1	Cumberlands (KY) (11–0)	28
6	Saint Francis (IN) (9–2)	14
3	Carroll (MT) (11–1)	27
7	Missouri Valley (MO) (9–2)	3
2	Grand View (IA) (11–0)	44
11	11 Tabor (KS) (10–2)	24
4	Baker (KS) (11–1)	28
5	Morningside (IA) (10–1)	36

Semifinals; December 7
1	Cumberlands (KY) (12–0)	34*
3	Carroll (MT) (12–1)	27
2	Grand View (IA) (12–0)	35
5	Morningside (IA) (10–2)	0

Finals
1	Cumberlands (KY) (13–0)	23
2	Grand View (IA) (13–0)	35

- * denotes OT.
