= Mike Woodley =

American football player and coach

Playing career

Football
- 1970–1973: Northern Iowa

Basketball
- 1972–1973: Northern Iowa
- Position: Free safety (football)

Coaching career (HC unless noted)

Football
- 1974–1975: Iowa (GA)
- 1976: Alamogordo HS (NM)
- 1977–1978: Waterloo East HS (IA)
- 1979–1982: Osage HS (IA)
- 1983–1988: Fort Dodge Senior HS (IA)
- 1989–1990: St. Ambrose (OC)
- 1991–1993: St. Ambrose
- 1994–2003: Iowa State (assistant)
- 2004–2007: Sam Rayburn HS (TX)
- 2008–2018: Grand View
- 2019–2020: Mount Marty

Baseball
- 1977: Alamogordo HS (NM)
- 1977–1979: Waterloo East HS (IA)

Head coaching record
- Overall: 107–53 (college football)
- Tournaments: 6–5 (NAIA playoffs)

Accomplishments and honors

Championships
- 1 NAIA (2013); 4 MSFA Midwest (2011–2014); 3 HAAC North Division (2015–2017)

Awards
- As a player: Second-team Little All-American (1973); As a coach: NAIA Coach of the Year (2013)

Mike Woodley is an American former football coach. He served as the head football coach at St. Ambrose University in Davenport, Iowa from 1991 to 1993 and Grand View University in Des Moines, Iowa from the program's inception in 2008 through the 2018 season, compiling a career college football coaching record of 107–53. Woodley left Grand View in June 2019 to become the first head football coach at Mount Marty College in Yankton, South Dakota. He retired in August 2021 before Mount Marty played its first game.

At Grand View, Woodley coached his 2013 team to a NAIA Football National Championship title. He was named the NAIA Football Coach of the Year Award that same season, voted the Mid-States Football Association Midwest League Coach of the Year in 2009, 2011, 2013, and 2014, and the Heart of America Conference Coach of the Year in 2015 and 2017. Woodley's coaching record with the Grand View Vikings was 93–35. His record with the St. Ambrose Fighting Bees was 14–18.

A four-year letter winner in football at the University of Northern Iowa, Woodley was a three-time all-conference first team player (1971–1973) and a second-team selection to the 1973 Little All-America college football team as a senior. The UNI Athletics Hall of Fame inducted Woodley in its Class of 2005.

As a high school football coach, Woodley coached in New Mexico, Iowa and Texas.

== Head coaching record ==
=== College football ===
Year	Team	Overall	Conference	Standing	Bowl/playoffs	NAIA^{#}
St. Ambrose Fighting Bees (NAIA Division II independent) (1991–1993)
1991	St. Ambrose	4–7				
1992	St. Ambrose	4–6				
1993	St. Ambrose	6–5				
St. Ambrose:		14–18				
Grand View Vikings (NAIA independent) (2008)
2008	Grand View	2–8				
Grand View Vikings (Mid-States Football Association) (2009–2014)
2009	Grand View	8–3	6–1	2nd (MWL)		21
2010	Grand View	6–4	4–3	4th (MWL)		
2011	Grand View	8–4	6–1	T–1st (MWL)	L NAIA First Round	18
2012	Grand View	8–3	5–1	T–1st (MWL)		16
2013	Grand View	14–0	6–0	1st (MWL)	W NAIA Championship	1
2014	Grand View	10–2	5–0	1st (MWL)	L NAIA Quarterfinal	6
Grand View Vikings (Heart of America Athletic Conference) (2015–2018)
2015	Grand View	11–2	5–0	1st (North)	L NAIA Quarterfinal	6
2016	Grand View	9–3	4–1	T–1st (North)	L NAIA First Round	9
2017	Grand View	9–3	4–1	1st (North)	L NAIA First Round	11
2018	Grand View	8–3	4–1	2nd (North)	L NAIA First Round	15
Grand View:		93–35	49–9			
Total:		107–53				
National championship Conference title Conference division title or championship game berth
^{#}Rankings from final NAIA Coaches' Poll.
