= Siler, Whitley County, Kentucky =

Unincorporated community in Kentucky, United States

Siler, Kentucky
- Unincorporated community
- Location within Kentucky Location within the United States
- Coordinates: 36°41′40″N 83°57′32″W
- Country: United States
- State: Kentucky
- County: Whitley
- Elevation: 978 ft (298 m)

Population (2020)
  - Total: 443
- Time zone: UTC-5 (Eastern (EST))
  - Summer (DST): UTC-4 (EDT)
- ZIP code: 40763
- Area code: 606
- GNIS feature ID: 503497

Siler is an unincorporated community in Whitley County, Kentucky, United States. The community is located along Kentucky Route 92 11.6 miles (18.7 km) east-southeast of Williamsburg. Siler has a post office with ZIP code 40763, which opened on October 5, 1904. It is located within the Bell, Knox, and Whitley tri-county area.

== History ==
The community was established in the late 19th century, likely taking its name from a local family of early settlers. Its development was tied to the broader expansion of rural settlements throughout southeastern Kentucky during that period.

In the early 20th century, Siler served as a small local hub supporting nearby coal operations in the region. While not a major mining center itself, the community provided housing and basic services for workers involved in coal extraction and transportation in surrounding areas. The establishment of a post office in 1904 marked Siler's emergence as a recognized settlement.

Throughout the mid-20th century, Siler remained a small, rural community, with its economy connected to agriculture and the declining coal industry. Today, it continues to exist as a quiet residential area within Whitley County.
