= 2013 college football season =

The 2013 college football season may refer to:

- 2013 NCAA Division I FBS football season
- 2013 NCAA Division I FCS football season
- 2013 NCAA Division II football season
- 2013 NCAA Division III football season
- 2013 NAIA Football National Championship
