= 1979 Kentucky lieutenant gubernatorial election =

- November 6, 1979
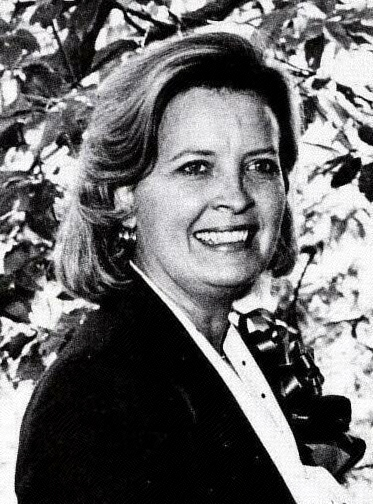

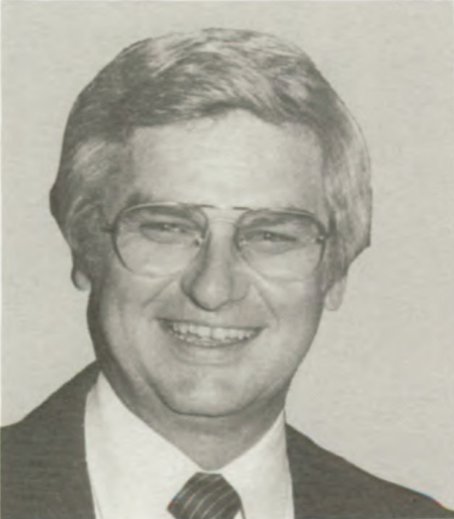
Nominee	Martha Layne Collins	Harold Rogers
Party	Democratic	Republican
Popular vote	543,176	316,718
Percentage	63.17%	36.83%
- County results Collins: 50–60% 60–70% 70–80% 80–90% Rogers: 50–60% 60–70% 70–80% 80–90%
Lieutenant Governor before election
Thelma Stovall
Democratic
Elected Lieutenant Governor
Martha Layne Collins
Democratic

The 1979 Kentucky lieutenant gubernatorial election took place on November 6, 1979, to elect the lieutenant governor of Kentucky. Incumbent Democratic lieutenant governor Thelma Stovall chose not to seek re-election to a second term, instead choosing to run for governor.

Kentucky Court of Appeals clerk Martha Layne Collins beat Republican nominee and commonwealth attorney for Pulaski and Rockcastle counties Harold Rogers. Just one year later, Rogers was elected to the United States House of Representatives for the state's fifth district.

== Democratic primary ==
Throughout the primary, Bill Cox was generally seen as the favorite to win the Democratic nomination for lieutenant governor. This changed however when Julian Carroll, the governor of Kentucky, began to be investigated by federal prosecutors over charges of being connected to a federal insurance kickback scandal. Jim Vernon, one of the candidates in the Democratic primary, accused Cox on a T.V. debate alleging that he was involved in the probe. Vernon said he was told by Frankfort FBI agent Jim Huggins that Cox was involved in the case, although Huggins disputed what was said in the conversation. Cox denied the allegations and repeatedly threatened to file suit against Vernon, then said he would not because he would have little chance of prevailing. On election day, Cox lost to Martha Layne Collins by a margin of 3,338 votes.

Terry McBrayer, the Carroll administration's favored candidate to win the Democratic primary in the gubernatorial election, also suffered criticism over being associated with the probe. He went on to lose the gubernatorial primary as well.

=== Candidates ===
==== Nominee ====
- Martha Layne Collins, Kentucky Court of Appeals clerk.

==== Eliminated in primary ====
- Bill Cox, administrator of the Federal Highway Administration.
- Joe Prather, State Senator from the 8th district.
- Richard Lewis, former aide to governor Julian Carroll.
- Todd Hollenbach, former Jefferson County Judge-Executive, candidate for governor in 1975, and father of Todd Hollenbach IV.
- Jim Vernon, former state public information commissioner.
- Chalrey T. Rowland.

=== Results ===
May 29, Democratic primary
Party	Candidate	Votes	%
Democratic	Martha Layne Collins	109,031	23.15%
Democratic	William M. Cox	105,693	22.44%
Democratic	Todd Hollenbach	96,019	20.39%
Democratic	Joe Prather	91,583	19.45%
Democratic	Richard Lewis	42,533	9.03%
Democratic	Jim Vernon	19,122	4.06%
Democratic	Chalrey T. Rowland	6,944	1.48%
Total votes		470,925	100.00%

== Republican primary ==
=== Candidates ===
==== Nominee ====
- Harold Rogers, commonwealth attorney for Pulaski and Rockcastle counties. (1969–1980)

==== Eliminated in primary ====
- Granville Thomas, perennial candidate.
- Bob Bersky, candidate for this seat in 1975.

=== Results ===
May 29, Republican primary
Party	Candidate	Votes	%
Republican	Harold Rogers	58,266	68.52%
Republican	Granville Thomas	16,977	19.96%
Republican	Bob Bersky	9,798	11.52%
Total votes		85,041	100.00%

== General election ==
=== Results ===
1979 Kentucky lieutenant gubernatorial election
Party	Candidate	Votes	%
Democratic	Martha Layne Collins	543,176	63.17%
Republican	Harold Rogers	316,718	36.83%
Total votes		859,894	100.00%
Democratic hold			
