= 1973 Little All-America college football team =

American college football all-star team

The 1973 Little All-America college football team, also known as the Small College All-America football team, is composed of college football players from small colleges and universities who were selected by the Associated Press (AP) as the best players at each position. For 1973, the AP selected three teams, each team having separate offensive and defensive platoons.

Walter Payton of Jackson State was named to the second-team at running back. The first-team running backs were Billy "White Shoes" Johnson of Widener (1,496 rushing yards, 23 touchdowns), freshman Wilbert Montgomery of Abilene Christian (compiling a record 31 touchdowns in the regular season, 37 including post-season), and Mike Thomas of UNLV (1,741 rushing yards).

Kim McQuilken of Lehigh was the first-team quarterback. He completed 62.5% of his passes for 2,603 yards and 19 touchdowns.

Defensive end Ed "Too Tall" Jones from Tennessee State stood out on the defensive squad and was the first overall pick of the 1974 NFL draft.

== First team ==
| Position | Player | Team |
|---|---|---|
Offense
| QB | Kim McQuilken | Lehigh |
| RB | Billy "White Shoes" Johnson | Widener |
| RB | Wilbert Montgomery | Abilene Christian |
| RB | Mike Thomas | UNLV |
| WR | Don Hutt | Boise State |
| TE | Scott Garske | Eastern Washington |
| T | Steve Drongowski | Wittenberg |
| T | Henry Lawrence | Florida A&M |
| G | Joe Kotval | Buena Vista |
| G | Herbert Scott | Virginia Union |
| C | Mark King | Troy State |
Defense
| DE | Ed "Too Tall" Jones | Tennessee State |
| DE | Thomas Henderson | Langston |
| DT | Gary "Big Hands" Johnson | Grambling |
| DT | Bill Kollar | Montana State |
| MG | Glenn Fleming | Northeast Louisiana |
| LB | Waymond Bryant | Tennessee State |
| LB | Eugene Simms | Morgan State |
| LB | Godwin Turk | Southern |
| DB | Autry Beamon | East Texas State |
| DB | Leonard Fairley | Alcorn A&M |
| DB | Marty Kranz | Mankato State |

== Second team ==
| Position | Player | Team |
|---|---|---|
Offense
| QB | Clint Longley | Abilene Christian |
| RB | Boyce Callahan | Jacksonville State |
| RB | Walter Payton | Jackson State |
| RB | Jimmy Smith | Northern Arizona |
| WR | Roger Carr | Louisiana Tech |
| TE | Bill Schlegel | Lehigh |
| T | Gregory Kindle | Tennessee State |
| T | John Passananti | Western Illinois |
| G | Phil Gustafson | Kearney State |
| G | Doug Lowrey | Arkansas State |
| C | Ed Paradis | IUP |
Defense
| DE | Jay Buse | Linfield |
| DE | Adrian Gant | Livingstone |
| DT | Fred Dean | Louisiana Tech |
| DT | Levi Stanley | Hawaii |
| MG | Alan Klein | Southeastern Louisiana |
| LB | Terry Factor | Slippery Rock |
| LB | Greg Lee | Cal Poly |
| LB | Steve Nelson | North Dakota State |
| DB | Ralph Gebhardt | Rochester |
| DB | Jim Muir | Elon |
| DB | Mike Woodley | Northern Iowa |

== Third team ==
| Position | Player | Team |
|---|---|---|
Offense
| QB | Prinson Poindexter | Livingstone |
| RB | Nate Anderson | Eastern Illinois |
| RB | Tony Giglio | Lafayette |
| RB | Saul Ravanell | Nebraska–Omaha |
| WR | John Holland | Tennessee State |
| TE | Bernie Peterson | Linfield |
| T | Dave Clapham | Nevada |
| T | Jim Pietrzak | Eastern Michigan |
| G | Coy Gibson | Wofford |
| G | Thomas Saxson | North Carolina Central |
| C | R. W. Hicks | Humboldt State |
Defense
| DE | Ed McAleny | UMass |
| DE | Lawrence Pillers | Alcorn A&M |
| DT | Glenn Ellis | Elon |
| DT | John Teerlinck | Western Illinois |
| MG | Sam Moser | Sioux Falls |
| LB | Greg Blankenship | Hayward State |
| LB | Joe McNeely | Louisiana Tech |
| LB | Charles Battle | Grambling |
| DB | William Bryant | Grambling |
| DB | Keith Krebsbach | North Dakota State |
| DB | Anthony Leonard | Virginia Union |

== See also ==
- 1973 College Football All-America Team
