= Boyce Callahan =

American football player (born 1942)

No. 33
- Position: Running back

Personal information
- Born: c. 1942
- Listed height: 5 ft 7 in (1.70 m)
- Listed weight: 155 lb (70 kg)

Career information
- High school: Saks
- College: Jacksonville State (1970–1973)

Awards and highlights
- Second-team Little All-American (1973)

Boyce Callahan (born c. 1942) is an American former football running back who played college football at Jacksonville State from 1970 to 1973. He rushed for 4,227 yards and 40 touchdowns. He was five-feet-seven inches and 155 pounds during his playing career. He was selected by the Associated Press as a second-team running back on the 1973 Little All-America college football team. Alabama Governor George Wallace proclaimed February 2, 1974, as "Boyce Callahan Day" in the State of Alabama. He was inducted into the Jacksonville State Athletic Hall of Fame in 1987. His jersey number 33 is one of two numbers that Jacksonville State has retired.
