= Joppa, Kentucky =

Unincorporated community in Kentucky, United States

Joppa
- Unincorporated community
- Location within the state of Kentucky Joppa (the United States)
- Coordinates: 37°3′6″N 85°14′32″W
- Country: United States
- State: Kentucky
- County: Adair
- Elevation: 837 ft (255 m)
- Time zone: UTC-6 (Central (CST))
  - Summer (DST): UTC-5 (CDT)
- GNIS feature ID: 508357

Joppa is an unincorporated community in Adair County, Kentucky, United States. Its elevation is 837 feet (255 m). The community is on Kentucky Route 92 and Kentucky Route 55 near a dead end on Lake Cumberland south of Jamestown.
