= 2013 Saint Francis Cougars football team =

American college football season

2013 Saint Francis Cougars football

NAIA Quarterfinalist MSFA (MEL) champion
- Conference: Mid-States Football Association
- Mideast League
- Record: 9–3 (5–1 MSFA (MEL))
- Head coach: Kevin Donley (16th season)
- Offensive coordinator: Patrick Donley, Trevor Miller (10th, 8th season)
- Defensive coordinator: Joey Didier, Eric Wagoner (4th, 6th season)
- Home stadium: Bishop John M. D'Arcy Stadium

2013 Mid-States Football Association standings
	Conf.			Overall
Team	W		L	W		L
Mideast League
No. 6 St. Francis (IN) x^	5	–	1	9	–	3
No. 21 St. Francis (IL)	4	–	2	7	–	4
Marian (IN)	4	–	2	6	–	5
Robert Morris (IL)	3	–	3	7	–	4
Taylor	3	–	3	5	–	5
Siena Heights	2	–	4	5	–	5
Concordia (MI)	0	–	6	1	–	9
Midwest League
No. 1 Grand View x^	6	–	0	14	–	0
No. 16 St. Ambrose ^	5	–	1	7	–	4
No. 18 Saint Xavier	4	–	2	7	–	4
William Penn	3	–	3	5	–	6
Trinity International	2	–	4	5	–	5
Olivet Nazarene	1	–	5	3	–	8
Waldorf	0	–	6	1	–	10
x – League champion/co-champions ^ – NAIA playoff participant; Rankings from NAIA Coaches' Poll

The 2013 Saint Francis Cougars football team represented the University of Saint Francis, located in Fort Wayne, Indiana, in the 2013 NAIA football season. They were led by head coach Kevin Donley, who served his 16th year as the first and only head coach in the history of Saint Francis football. The Cougars played their home games at Bishop John D'Arcy Stadium and were members of the Mid-States Football Association (MSFA) Mideast League (MEL). The Cougars finished 1st in the MSFA MEL division and received an automatic bid to participate in the postseason NAIA playoffs.

== Schedule ==
(9–3 overall, 5–1 conference)

Date	Time	Opponent	Rank	Site	Result	Attendance
September 14	2:00pm	at No. 16 William Penn (IA)*	No. 5	Lacey Complex; Oskaloosa, IA	W 31–13	1,000
September 21	7:00pm	No. 7 St. Ambrose (IA)*	No. 2	Bishop D'Arcy Stadium; Fort Wayne, IN	W 38–37	4,011
September 28	2:00pm	at No. 7 Grand View (IA)*	No. 2	Williams Stadium; Des Moines, IA	L 7–23	973
October 5	1:00pm	at No. 25 Siena Heights (MI)	No. 6	O'Laughlin Stadium; Adrian, MI	W 28–17	2,517
October 12	7:00pm	No. 10 Saint Xavier (IL)*^{†}	No. 4	Bishop D'Arcy Stadium; Fort Wayne, IN	W 45–20	4,100
October 19	5:00pm	at No. 20 St. Francis (IL)	No. 4	ATI Field at Joliet Memorial Stadium; Joliet, IL	W 37–28	1,150
October 26	12:00pm	Robert Morris (IL)	No. 4	Bishop D'Arcy Stadium; Fort Wayne, IN	L 24–28	3,175
November 2	12:00pm	Concordia (MI)	No. 10	Bishop D'Arcy Stadium; Fort Wayne, IN	W 54–0	2,300
November 9	1:00pm	at Taylor (IN)	No. 8	Turner Stadium; Upland, IN	W 20–12	2,886
November 16	12:00pm	Marian (IN)	No. 6	Bishop D'Arcy Stadium; Fort Wayne, IN	W 41–24	3,163
November 23	12:00pm	No. 9 Faulkner (AL)*	No. 6	Bishop D'Arcy Stadium; Fort Wayne, IN (NAIA First Round)	W 20–13	1,613
November 30	12:00pm	at No. 1 Cumberlands (KY)*	No. 6	James H. Taylor, II Stadium; Williamsburg, KY (NAIA Quarterfinal)	L 14–28	1,400
*Non-conference game; ^{†}Homecoming; Rankings from Coaches' Poll released prior to the game; All times are in Eastern time

== Game summaries ==
9/14/2013 - The Cougars opened the season against a formidable opponent in William Penn. The week prior, the Statesmen had opened their season with a convincing victory over then 9th-ranked Bethel (TN). The lack of a poll after that week kept the Statesmen from a higher national ranking. This game was tied 10–10 at the half. But USF took control in the second half, aided by a game-ending injury to the Statesmen's starting quarterback. The Cougars scored the last 21 points in the game. For their effort on the week, the Cougars were elevated to #2 in the NAIA Coaches Poll.

9/21/2013 - The Cougars home opener was against St. Ambrose, a tough 7th-ranked team that gave the Cougars a 1-point loss last season. The game's outcome wasn't certain until all time had expired from the clock. After scoring a late 4th quarter touchdown, the Bees had a chance to kick for 1 point to tie the score at 38–38. But the Bees opted instead to attempt a 2-point conversion. An incomplete pass denied the Bees the lead at that time. Later in the quarter, as time was running out, The Bees attempted a game-winning field goal. But the kick sailed wide as the clock struck :00, and Saint Francis came away with a 1-point victory of their own, 38–37. Next week, the Cougars return to the road to face their 3rd ranked opponent in 3 weeks when they visit #7 Grand View (IA).

9/28/2013 - The Cougars went on the road and fell to defeat against an impressive Grand View team, 23–7. For their win, Grand View improved to #4 in the national polls, while Saint Francis dropped 4 places to #6. The Cougars next opponent, Siena Heights (Mich.), entered the national polls for the first time, appearing at #25 in this week's rankings.

10/5/2013 - The Cougars went on the road to another tough ranked opponent. The Cougars trailed 17–14 at halftime. Under the leadership of quarterback David Yoder, who replaced an injured Josh Miller, the Cougars scored two touchdowns in the second half while holding Siena Heights scoreless to give them a 28–17 victory. This was their first conference win of the season.

== Ranking movements ==
Ranking movements Legend: ██ Increase in ranking ██ Decrease in ranking
	Week											
Poll	Pre	1	2	3	4	5	6	7	8	9	10	Final
NAIA Coaches' Poll	5	2	2	6	4	4	4	10	8	6	6	6
