= 2013 Grand View Vikings football team =

American college football season

2013 Grand View Vikings football

NAIA national champion MSFA Midwest League champion

NAIA national championship game, W 35–23 vs. Cumberlands (KY)
- Conference: Mid-States Football Association
- Midwest League
- Record: 14–0 (6–0 MSFA)
- Head coach: Mike Woodley (6th season)
- Defensive coordinator: Joe Woodley (6th season)

2013 Mid-States Football Association standings
	Conf.			Overall
Team	W		L	W		L
Mideast League
No. 6 St. Francis (IN) x^	5	–	1	9	–	3
No. 21 St. Francis (IL)	4	–	2	7	–	4
Marian (IN)	4	–	2	6	–	5
Robert Morris (IL)	3	–	3	7	–	4
Taylor	3	–	3	5	–	5
Siena Heights	2	–	4	5	–	5
Concordia (MI)	0	–	6	1	–	9
Midwest League
No. 1 Grand View x^	6	–	0	14	–	0
No. 16 St. Ambrose ^	5	–	1	7	–	4
No. 18 Saint Xavier	4	–	2	7	–	4
William Penn	3	–	3	5	–	6
Trinity International	2	–	4	5	–	5
Olivet Nazarene	1	–	5	3	–	8
Waldorf	0	–	6	1	–	10
x – League champion/co-champions ^ – NAIA playoff participant; Rankings from NAIA Coaches' Poll

The 2013 Grand View Vikings football team was an American football team that represented Grand View University as a member of the Mid-States Football Association (MSFA) during the 2013 NAIA football season. In Grand View's sixth season of collete football, all under head coach Mike Woodley, the Vikings compiled a perfect 14–0 record (6–0 against MSFA opponents) and won the NAIA national championship, defeating Cumberlands (Kentucky), 35–23, in the championship game.

Key players included quarterback Derek Fulton who passed for four touchdowns and ran for another in the NAIA national championship game.

The team played its home games at Williams Stadium in Des Moines, Iowa.

== Schedule ==
Date	Opponent	Site	Result	Attendance	Source
August 29	at Drake*	Drake Stadium; Des Moines, IA	W 21–16	5,068	
September 7	at Siena Heights	O'Laughlin Stadium; Adrian, MI	W 24–21	1,236	
September 21	at Marian	St.V Health Field; Indianapolis, IN	W 30–7	2,730	
September 28	Saint Francis	Williams Stadium; Des Moines, IA	W 23–7	973	
October 5	at Saint Xavier	Deaton Field; Chicago, IL	W 48–21	3,000	
October 12	at Olivet Nazarene	Ward Field; Bourbonnais, IL	W 48–17	1,374	
October 19	Trinity International	Willims Stadium; Des Moines, IA	W 47–14	2,000	
October 26	Saint Ambrose	Williams Stadium; Des Moines, IA	W 35–21		
November 2	at Waldorf	Bolstorff Field; Forest City, IA	W 70–14	316	
November 9	William Penn	Williams Stadium; Des Moines, IA	W 25–17		
November 23	Ottawa	Williams Stadium; Des Moines, IA (NAIA first round)	W 38–13		
November 30	Tabor	Williams Stadium; Des Moines, IA (NAIA quarterfinal)	W 44–24		
December 7	Morningside	Williams Stadium; Des Moines, IA (NAIA semifinal)	W 35–0	3,500	
December 21	vs. Cumberlands (KY)	Barron Stadium; Rome, GA (NAIA Championship Game)	W 35–23	5,295	
*Non-conference game
