= 2013 NAIA football rankings =

One human poll makes up the 2013 National Association of Intercollegiate Athletics (NAIA) football rankings, sometimes called the NAIA Coaches' Poll or the football ratings. When the regular season is complete, the NAIA plans to sponsor a playoff to determine the year's national champion. A final poll will be taken after completion of the 2013 NAIA Football National Championship.

== Poll release dates ==
The poll release dates are scheduled to be:

2013 poll release dates
Spring	April 18
Preseason	August 12
Week 1	September 16
Week 2	September 23
Week 3	September 30
Week 4	October 7
Week 5	October 14
Week 6	October 21
Week 7	October 28
Week 8	November 4
Week 9	November 11
Week 10 (Final Regular Season)	November 17
Postseason	December 24

== Week by week rankings ==
	Week 0-Spring Apr 18	Week 0-Preseason Aug 12	Week 1-Poll 1 Sep 16	Week 2-Poll 2 Sep 23	Week 3-Poll 3 Sep 30	Week 4-Poll 4 Oct 7	Week 5-Poll 5 Oct 14	Week 6-Poll 6 Oct 21	Week 7-Poll 7 Oct 28	Week 8-Poll 8 Nov 4	Week 9-Poll 9 Nov 11	Week 10-Final Nov 17	Week 11-Postseason Dec 23	
1.	Marian (IN) (10)	Morningside (IA) (4)	Morningside (IA) (14)	Morningside (IA) (14)	Morningside (IA) (14)	Morningside (IA)	Morningside (IA)	Morningside (IA)	Morningside (IA)	Morningside (IA)	Cumberlands (KY)	Cumberlands (KY)	Grand View (IA)	1.
2.	Morningside (IA) (3)	(T) Marian (IN) (8)	Saint Francis (IN)	Saint Francis (IN)	Cumberlands (KY)	Cumberlands (KY)	Cumberlands (KY)	Cumberlands (KY)	Cumberlands (KY)	Cumberlands (KY)	Grand View (IA)	Grand View (IA)	Cumberlands (KY)	2.
3.	Missouri Valley (MO)	(T) Missouri Valley (MO) (1)	Cumberlands (KY)	Carroll (MT)	Saint Xavier (IL)	Grand View (IA)	Grand View (IA)	Grand View (IA)	Grand View (IA)	Grand View (IA)	Carroll (MT)	Carroll (MT)	Carroll (MT)	3.
4.	Saint Xavier (IL)	Saint Xavier (IL)	Carroll (MT)	Cumberlands (KY)	Grand View (IA)	Saint Francis (IN)	Saint Francis (IN)	Saint Francis (IN)	Benedictine (KS)	Benedictine (KS)	Baker (KS)	Baker (KS)	Morningside (IA)	4.
5.	Southern Oregon	Saint Francis (IN)	Saint Xavier (IL)	Saint Xavier (IL)	Georgetown (KY)	Benedictine (KS)	Benedictine (KS)	Benedictine (KS)	Carroll (MT)	Carroll (MT)	Morningside (IA)	Morningside (IA)	Baker (KS)	5.
6.	Saint Francis (IN)	Georgetown (KY)	Georgetown (KY)	Georgetown (KY)	Saint Francis (IN)	Missouri Valley (MO)	Missouri Valley (MO)	Missouri Valley (MO)	Baker (KS)	Baker (KS)	Saint Francis (IN)	Saint Francis (IN)	Saint Francis (IN)	6.
7.	Cumberlands (KY)	Montana Tech	St. Ambrose (IA)	Grand View (IA)	Benedictine (KS)	Carroll (MT)	Carroll (MT)	Carroll (MT)	Tabor (KS)	Rocky Mountain (MT)	Missouri Valley (MO)	Missouri Valley (MO)	Missouri Valley (MO)	7.
8.	Georgetown (KY)	Cumberlands (KY)	Baker (KS)	Tabor (KS)	Missouri Valley (MO)	Ottawa (KS)	Ottawa (KS)	St. Ambrose (IA)	Rocky Mountain (MT)	Saint Francis (IN)	Ottawa (KS)	Benedictine (KS)	Tabor (KS)	8.
9.	Bethel (TN)	Bethel (TN)	Grand View (IA)	Missouri Valley (MO)	Carroll (MT)	St. Ambrose (IA)	St. Ambrose (IA)	Baker (KS)	Peru State (NE)	Ottawa (KS)	Benedictine (KS)	Faulkner (AL)	Benedictine (KS)	9.
10.	St. Ambrose (IA)	MidAmerica Nazarene (KS)	Tabor (KS)	Benedictine (KS)	Ottawa (KS)	Saint Xavier (IL)	Baker (KS)	Rocky Mountain (MT)	Saint Francis (IN)	Missouri Valley (MO)	Faulkner (AL)	Rocky Mountain (MT)	Faulkner (AL)	10.
11.	Montana Tech	St. Ambrose (IA)	Missouri Valley (MO)	St. Ambrose (IA)	St. Ambrose (IA)	Baker (KS)	Georgetown (KY)	Tabor (KS)	Ottawa (KS)	St. Ambrose (IA)	Rocky Mountain (MT)	Tabor (KS)	Rocky Mountain (MT)	11.
12.	MidAmerica Nazarene (KS)	Carroll (MT)	Montana Tech	Ottawa (KS)	Baker (KS)	Georgetown (KY)	Rocky Mountain (MT)	Peru State (NE)	Missouri Valley (MO)	Faulkner (AL)	Tabor (KS)	Northwestern (IA)	Georgetown (KY)	12.
13.	Northwestern (IA)	Northwestern (IA)	Ottawa (KS)	Baker (KS)	Doane (NE)	Rocky Mountain (MT)	Tabor (KS)	Ottawa (KS)	St. Ambrose (IA)	Peru State (NE)	Northwestern (IA)	(T) Georgetown (KY)	Northwestern (IA)	13.
14.	Baker (KS)	Southern Oregon	Benedictine (KS)	Doane (NE)	Lindsey Wilson (KY)	Tabor (KS)	Concordia (NE)	Saint Xavier (IL)	Saint Xavier (IL)	(T) Tabor (KS)	Georgetown (KY)	(T) Sterling (KS)	Sterling (KS)	14.
15.	William Penn (IA)	Baker (KS)	MidAmerica Nazarene (KS)	Montana Western	Tabor (KS)	Concordia (NE)	Friends (KS)	Faulkner (AL)	Faulkner (AL)	(T) Georgetown (KY)	Lindsey Wilson (KY)	Ottawa (KS)	Ottawa (KS)	15.
16.	Ottawa (KS)	William Penn (IA)	Marian (IN)	Lindsey Wilson (KY)	Rocky Mountain (MT)	Valley City State (ND)	Peru State (NE)	Concordia (NE)	Georgetown (KY)	Friends (KS)	Sterling (KS)	St. Ambrose (IA)	St. Ambrose (IA)	16.
17.	Grand View (IA)	Tabor (KS)	St. Francis (IL)	Northwestern (IA)	Concordia (NE)	(T) Friends (KS)	Saint Xavier (IL)	Georgetown (KY)	Friends (KS)	Lindsey Wilson (KY)	(T) St. Ambrose (IA)	Friends (KS)	Friends (KS)	17.
18.	Carroll (MT)	Ottawa (KS)	Doane (NE)	Rocky Mountain (MT)	Valley City State (ND)	(T) Lindsey Wilson (KY)	Montana State-Northern	Friends (KS)	Lindsey Wilson (KY)	Sterling (KS)	(T) St. Francis (IL)	Saint Xavier (IL)	Saint Xavier (IL)	18.
19.	Tabor (KS)	Grand View (IA)	Rocky Mountain (MT)	Valley City State (ND)	Montana State-Northern	Peru State (NE)	Faulkner (AL)	Reinhardt (GA)	Sterling (KS)	Northwestern (IA)	(T) Peru State (NE)	Lindsey Wilson (KY)	Lindsey Wilson (KY)	19.
20.	Cumberland (TN)	Doane (NE)	William Penn (IA)	Concordia (NE)	Friends (KS)	Doane (NE)	St. Francis (IL)	Lindsey Wilson (KY)	Southern Oregon	(T) Reinhardt (GA)	(T) Friends (KS)	Dakota Wesleyan (SD)	Dakota Wesleyan (SD)	20.
21.	Doane (NE)	Belhaven (MS)	Northwestern (IA)	Montana Tech	Montana Western	Trinity International (IL)	Lindsey Wilson (KY)	Sterling (KS)	Northwestern (IA)	(T) St. Francis (IL)	Saint Xavier (IL)	Langston (OK)	St. Francis (IL)	21.
22.	Benedictine (KS)	Evangel (MO)	Robert Morris (IL)	St. Francis (IL)	William Penn (IA)	Nebraska Wesleyan	Valley City State (ND)	Southern Oregon	Reinhardt (GA)	Bacone (OK)	Dakota Wesleyan (SD)	St. Francis (IL)	Langston (OK)	22.
23.	Evangel (MO)	Langston (OK)	Faulkner (AL)	Peru State (NE)	Robert Morris (IL)	Faulkner (AL)	Trinity International (IL)	Northwestern (IA)	St. Francis (IL)	Saint Xavier (IL)	Cumberland (TN)	Cumberland (TN)	Cumberland (TN)	23.
24.	Valley City State (ND)	Benedictine (KS)	Lindsey Wilson (KY)	Trinity International (IL)	Peru State (NE)	Montana State-Northern	Reinhardt (GA)	St. Francis (IL)	Bacone (OK)	Robert Morris (IL)	Langston (OK)	Peru State (NE)	Peru State (NE)	24.
25.	Robert Morris (IL)	Cumberland (TN)	Pikeville (KY)	William Penn (IA)	Siena Heights (MI)	St. Francis (IL)	Cumberland (TN)	Bacone (OK)	Concordia (NE)	Southern Oregon	Bacone (OK)	Eastern Oregon	Eastern Oregon	25.
	Week 0-Spring Apr 18	Week 0-Preseason Aug 12	Week 1-Poll 1 Sep 16	Week 2-Poll 2 Sep 23	Week 3-Poll 3 Sep 30	Week 4-Poll 4 Oct 7	Week 5-Poll 5 Oct 14	Week 6-Poll 6 Oct 21	Week 7-Poll 7 Oct 28	Week 8-Poll 8 Nov 4	Week 9-Poll 9 Nov 11	Week 10-Final Nov 17	Week 11-Postseason Dec 23	
		Dropped: Robert Morris (IL); Valley City State (ND)	Dropped: Bethel (TN); Southern Oregon; Belhaven (MS); Evangel (MO); Langston (OK); Cumberland (TN)	Dropped: MidAmerica Nazarene (KS); Marian (IN); Robert Morris (IL); Faulkner (AL); Pikeville (KY)	Dropped: Northwestern (IA); Montana Tech; St. Francis (IL); Trinity International (IL)	Dropped: Montana Western; William Penn (IA); Robert Morris (IL); Siena Heights (MI)	Dropped: Doane (NE); Nebraska Wesleyan	Dropped: Montana State-Northern; Valley City State (ND); Trinity International (IL); Cumberland (TN)	Dropped: NONE	Dropped: Concordia (NE)	Dropped: Reinhardt (GA); Robert Morris (IL); Southern Oregon	Dropped: Bacone (OK)	Dropped: NONE	

Legend
	No change in ranking
	Increase in ranking
	Decrease in ranking
	Not ranked previous week
	NAIA National Champion
(т)	Tied with team above or below also with this symbol

== Leading Vote-Getters ==
Since the inception of the Coaches' Poll in 1999, the #1 ranking in the various weekly polls has been held by only a select group of teams. Through the end of 2013, the team and the number of times they have held the #1 weekly ranking are shown below. The number of times a team has been ranked #1 in the postseason poll (the national champion) is shown in parentheses.

In 1999, the results of a postseason poll, if one was conducted, are not known. Therefore, an additional poll was presumed, and the #1 postseason ranking has been credited to the postseason tournament champion, the Northwestern Oklahoma State Rangers.

Team	Total #1 Rankings
Carroll (MT)	56 (6)
Sioux Falls (SD)	55 (3)
Georgetown (KY)	25 (2)
Saint Xavier (IL)	14 (1)
Northwestern Oklahoma State	12 (1)
Marian (IN)	9 (1)
Morningside (IA)	9
Azusa Pacific (CA)	3
Saint Francis (IN)	3
Cumberlands (KY)	2
Grand View (IA)	1 (1)
