= Barrier, Kentucky =

Unincorporated community in Kentucky, United States

Barrier
- Unincorporated community
- Location within the state of Kentucky
- Coordinates: 36°46′08″N 84°46′02″W
- Country: United States
- State: Kentucky
- County: Wayne
- Elevation: 958 ft (292 m)
- Time zone: UTC-5 (Eastern (EST))
  - Summer (DST): UTC-4 (EDT)
- GNIS feature ID: 486443

Barrier is an unincorporated community in Wayne County, in the U.S. state of Kentucky. The community is located on Kentucky Route 92.

== History ==
A post office was established at Barrier in 1902, and remained in operation until 1974. The community derives its name from Rev. Richard Barrier, an early settler.

== Notable people ==
- Hal Rogers (born 1937), U.S. representative for Kentucky
