= Cumberland Inn & Museum =

Museum In University of The Cumberlands

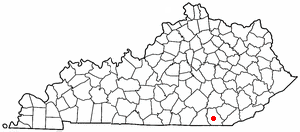
- Location: 649 South 10th Street, Williamsburg, Kentucky, United States
- Coordinates: 36.72689°N 84.16638°W
- Website: Museum website

The Cumberland Inn & Museum, located in Williamsburg, Kentucky, are owned and operated by University of the Cumberlands. The facility opened in May 1994 as a way for Cumberland College to offer its students a positive work experience while promoting the college to visitors.

The Robert O. Williams museum now contains over 7,000 crosses and crucifixes. The collection started when as a chaplain in the Air Force Williams he became aware of the special symbolism the cross had for Christians and of the variety of forms that had been used to portray this symbol.

The museum's collections were featured on Kentucky Educational Television.
