= Don Hutt =

American football player (1952–2015)

No. 81
- Position: Wide receiver

Personal information
- Born: November 24, 1952; Logan, Utah, U.S.
- Died: March 23, 2015 (aged 62); Boise, Idaho, U.S.
- Listed height: 6 ft 1 in (1.85 m)
- Listed weight: 195 lb (88 kg)

Career information
- College: Boise State
- NFL draft: 1974: 9th round, 213th overall pick

Career history
- The Hawaiians (1974); Hamilton Tiger-Cats (1975)*
- * Offseason or practice squad member only

Awards and highlights
- First-team Little All-American (1973)

Donald Oorval Hutt (November 24, 1952 – March 23, 2015) was an American football wide receiver who played college football for Boise State, and professional football in the World Football League (WFL) for The Hawaiians.

== Biography ==
A native of Logan, Utah, Hutt played college football at Boise State from 1971 to 1973. As a senior in 1973, he caught 93 passes and ranked first among college division receivers. On November 24, 1973, Hutt set Boise State's single-game records with 15 receptions for 237 yards against UC Davis. He was selected as the first-team wide receiver on the 1973 Little All-America college football team. He was also named to the All-Big Sky first team three consecutive years from 1971 to 1973. He was also selected as the Idaho amateur athlete of the year in March 1974.

Hutt was drafted by the Los Angeles Rams in the ninth round of the 1974 NFL draft but instead signed with The Hawaiians of the newly-formed WFL. He caught 11 passes for 104 yards with The Hawaiians. In May 1975, Hutt signed with the Hamilton Tiger-Cats of the Canadian Football League.

In 1976, Hutt returned to Boise State as a student assistant working with the receivers. Hutt died in March 2015.
