= Kentucky Splash Waterpark =

Amusement park in Williamsburg, Kentucky

Kentucky Splash Waterpark and Campground
- Interactive map of Kentucky Splash Waterpark and Campground
- Location: Williamsburg, Kentucky, U.S.
- Coordinates: 36.727689°N 84.175122°W
- Opened: May 2001.
- Slogan: Stay and Play!
- Operating season: May - September
- Website: http://www.kentuckysplash.com

Kentucky Splash Waterpark is an amusement park which includes a waterpark, miniature golf course, and campground in Williamsburg, Kentucky.
