= Timsley, Kentucky =

Unincorporated community in Kentucky, United States

Tinsley
- Unincorporated community
- Tinsley
- Location within the state of Kentucky Tinsley (the United States)
- Coordinates: 36°47′3″N 83°46′6″W
- Country: United States
- State: Kentucky
- County: Bell
- Elevation: 1,014 ft (309 m)
- Time zone: UTC-5 (Eastern (EST))
  - Summer (DST): UTC-4 (EDT)
- GNIS feature ID: 509213

Tinsley is an unincorporated community located in Bell County, Kentucky, United States.
