= Williamsburg, Kentucky =

- City
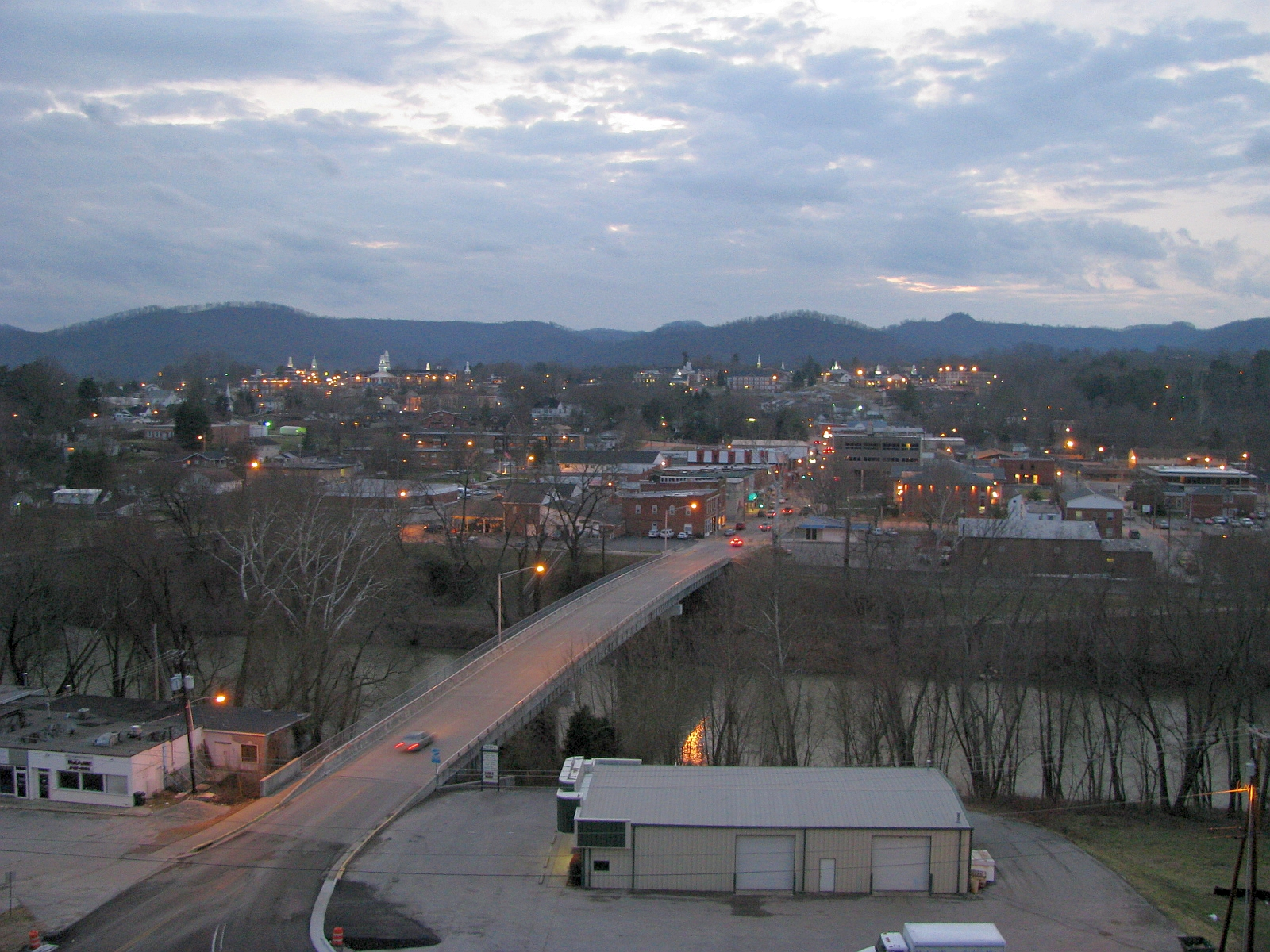
- Nicknames: The 'Burg; Gateway to the Cumberlands
- Motto: "Feels Like Home"
- Location of Williamsburg in Whitley County, Kentucky.
- Coordinates: 36°44′22″N 84°09′52″W
- Country: United States
- State: Kentucky
- County: Whitley
- Established: February 5, 1819
- Incorporated: March 3, 1851
- First meeting of city government: June 4, 1894

Government
  - Mayor: Roddy Harrison

Area
  - Total: 4.28 sq mi (11.08 km^{2})
  - Land: 4.17 sq mi (10.80 km^{2})
  - Water: 0.11 sq mi (0.28 km^{2})
- Elevation: 1,007 ft (307 m)

Population (2020)
  - Total: 5,326
  - Estimate (2024): 5,332
  - Density: 1,277.4/sq mi (493.21/km^{2})
- Time zone: UTC-5 (EST)
  - Summer (DST): UTC-4 (EDT)
- ZIP code: 40769
- Area code: 606
- FIPS code: 21-83334
- GNIS feature ID: 2405747
- Website: http://www.williamsburgky.com/

Williamsburg is a home rule-class city in and the county seat of Whitley County, on the southeastern border of Kentucky, United States. The population was 5,326 at the 2020 census. Developed along the Cumberland River, the city was founded in 1818 and named after William Whitley.

== History ==
Williamsburg was first known by early European-American settlers as the Spring Ford, after a nearby ford crossing the Cumberland River. On April 19, 1818, the first meeting of the Whitley County Court was held at Samuel Cox's dwelling. This first court appointed local officials as well as constables to work with the county militia. The town was known simply as Whitley Courthouse. In 1882, the city was renamed as Williamsburgh, and the spelling was changed in 1890 to the current Williamsburg.

The town's initial growth was fueled by three freshwater springs in the area. Settlers were attracted to this water source. They later developed coal mining and lumber industries, based on natural resources of the area.

Construction of the Louisville and Nashville Railroad (L&N) to the town in 1883 stimulated new growth. It connected the town to far-flung markets and attracted new residents and trade. Shortly thereafter in 1886, the town elected W. H. Parker as its first mayor.

This first city government enacted a number of new ordinances including:

- Prohibiting "Bawdy Houses" (brothels)
- Prohibiting Gambling
- Prohibiting Fornication
- Prohibiting Rolling Hoops on Sidewalks
- Prohibiting Barbering on Sundays
- Prohibiting Unattended Cattle on Main Street

The Williamsburg school system was established in 1909; the town residents voted to consolidate the multiple single-room schools in the area into a unified school district. The first consolidated school building was destroyed by fire in 1926. It was rebuilt for the school administration. Later the structure was adapted as the Anderson Building, which is used in the early 21st century by the University of the Cumberlands. The school district moved to its current location in 1983.

The county courthouse was destroyed by fire in 1931. It was rebuilt at the time. Forty years later, it underwent a major renovation to bring it up to standards of 1971. In 2011, the newly constructed Whitley County Judicial Center was completed adjacent to the old courthouse, and the courts moved to the new building.

== Geography ==
Williamsburg is located within the Eastern Mountain Coal Fields and the Appalachian Plateau regions. The oldest parts of the city lie in a bend of the Cumberland River just downstream of where the Clear Fork flows into it east of the city. The University of the Cumberlands occupies the heights within the river bend. The I-75 corridor runs past the west side of the city with exits 11 and 15 providing access. I-75 leads north 103 mi (166 km) to Lexington and south 70 mi (113 km) to Knoxville, Tennessee. U.S. Route 25W runs to the east of downtown from south to north, leading north 21 mi (34 km) to Corbin and south 13 mi (21 km) to Jellico, Tennessee. Kentucky Route 92 runs through the city from west to east, leading east 35 mi (56 km) to Fourmile and west 20 mi (32 km) to Pine Knot. The city has a single active rail line running north to south, with a single branch that goes east to the Gatliff Mine.

According to the United States Census Bureau, the city has a total area of 4.8 square miles (12 km^{2}), of which 4.7 square miles (12 km^{2}) is land and 0.1 square miles (0.26 km^{2}) (2.10%) is water.

Percent of U.S. within 600 miles (970 km) of Williamsburg:

- Population: 52%
- Personal Income: 50%
- Retail Sales: 49%
- Manufacturing Employment: 57%

=== Climate ===
The climate in this area is characterized by hot, humid summers and generally mild to cool winters. According to the Köppen Climate Classification system, Williamsburg has a humid subtropical climate, abbreviated "Cfa" on climate maps.

Climate data for Williamsburg, Kentucky (1991–2020)
Month	Jan	Feb	Mar	Apr	May	Jun	Jul	Aug	Sep	Oct	Nov	Dec	Year
Mean daily maximum °F (°C)	45.3 (7.4)	49.2 (9.6)	59.3 (15.2)	68.8 (20.4)	76.5 (24.7)	84.4 (29.1)	87.1 (30.6)	84.6 (29.2)	79.5 (26.4)	69.6 (20.9)	58.3 (14.6)	48.7 (9.3)	67.6 (19.8)
Daily mean °F (°C)	35.0 (1.7)	37.9 (3.3)	46.1 (7.8)	54.9 (12.7)	64.3 (17.9)	72.5 (22.5)	75.3 (24.1)	73.5 (23.1)	67.1 (19.5)	56.8 (13.8)	45.8 (7.7)	38.3 (3.5)	55.6 (13.1)
Mean daily minimum °F (°C)	24.8 (−4.0)	26.6 (−3.0)	33.0 (0.6)	41.0 (5.0)	52.1 (11.2)	60.6 (15.9)	63.4 (17.4)	62.3 (16.8)	54.7 (12.6)	44.0 (6.7)	33.3 (0.7)	27.8 (−2.3)	43.6 (6.5)
Average precipitation inches (mm)	4.20 (107)	4.54 (115)	5.06 (129)	4.96 (126)	4.89 (124)	4.67 (119)	4.57 (116)	4.19 (106)	3.96 (101)	2.53 (64)	3.23 (82)	5.17 (131)	51.97 (1,320)
Average snowfall inches (cm)	4.1 (10)	2.6 (6.6)	2.0 (5.1)	0.0 (0.0)	0.0 (0.0)	0.0 (0.0)	0.0 (0.0)	0.0 (0.0)	0.0 (0.0)	0.0 (0.0)	0.0 (0.0)	2.5 (6.4)	11.2 (28.1)
Source: NOAA

== Points of interest ==
Williamsburg is home to the Kentucky Splash Waterpark (located within the Hal Rogers Family Entertainment Center). The $5 million facility also houses a go-cart course, a miniature golf course, and a five-station batting cage. The park opened on Memorial Day weekend 2001 and is the largest family entertainment center in Kentucky with a capacity of up to 3,000 guests.

Williamsburg is located 18 miles (29 km) away Cumberland Falls State Resort Park within the Daniel Boone National Forest. The park is the home of Cumberland Falls, sometimes called the Little Niagara, the Niagara of the South or the Great Falls and is the only venue in the Western Hemisphere where a moonbow or lunar rainbow is regularly visible on a clear night with a full moon. On average the falls, which flow over a resistant sandstone bed, are 68 feet (21 m) high and 125 feet (38 m) wide, with an average water flow of 3,600 cubic feet (100 m^{3}) per second (100 m^{3}/s).Trails winding downstream from the park on either side of the river lead to the smaller Angel Falls and Dog Slaughter Falls. Angel Falls is located 1.5 miles (2.4 km) from the park on the McCreary County side and Dog Slaughter Falls is located 3.5 miles (5.6 km) from the park on the Whitley County side. The Below the Falls section of the river includes a five-mile (8 km) long class 2–3 run that is ideal for families and beginner stage white water rafters and kayakers.

Williamsburg is located 20 minutes away from the Big South Fork of the Cumberland River, a major tributary of the Cumberland River system and a class 3–4 whitewater canoeing and kayaking stream. The Big South Fork is also home to Yahoo Falls, which stand 113 feet (34.8 m) high. Further along, the trail leads to the Yahoo Arch.

Williamsburg is also home to one of the top bluegrass festivals in the state of Kentucky (the Sally Gap Bluegrass Festival). Other events are the Jeep Jamboree (an off-road sporting event), and the Border Bowl, an annual event for two teams of high school footballers representing Kentucky and Tennessee.

== Religion ==
As of the 2000 census, Whitley County, Kentucky, of which Williamsburg is the county seat, consisted of 22,645 Evangelical Christians, 1,741 Mainline Christians, 130 Catholics, and 11,394 individuals who are not members of the 188 groups included in the Churches & Church Membership Data. As of the same date, 69.4% of individuals in Whitley County were members of the Southern Baptist Convention. Williamsburg boasts 21 religious institutions or one religious institution per 243 citizens, and, as of the year 2000, the region that contains the town has been designated the second densest region of the bible belt. University of the Cumberlands, located in the town, is a private Christian college that was affiliated with the Kentucky Baptist Convention, a member of the Southern Baptist Convention, until separating from the convention in 2018.

== Economy ==
Top Employers:

1. Firestone Industrial Products
2. Whitley County School System
3. Williamsburg Plastics
4. University of The Cumberlands
5. Southeastern Kentucky Rehabilitation Industries (SEKRI)
6. Computer Sciences Corporation (CSC)
7. Walmart
8. Kentucky Consular Center

== Demographics ==
Historical population
Census	Pop.	Note	%±
1860	126		—
1870	139		10.3%
1880	208		49.6%
1890	1,376		561.5%
1900	1,495		8.6%
1910	2,004		34.0%
1920	1,767		−11.8%
1930	1,826		3.3%
1940	2,331		27.7%
1950	3,348		43.6%
1960	3,478		3.9%
1970	3,687		6.0%
1980	5,560		50.8%
1990	5,493		−1.2%
2000	5,143		−6.4%
2010	5,245		2.0%
2020	5,326		1.5%
2024 (est.)	5,332		0.1%

=== 2020 census ===
As of the 2020 census, Williamsburg had a population of 5,326. The median age was 27.7 years. 21.0% of residents were under the age of 18 and 13.6% of residents were 65 years of age or older. For every 100 females there were 116.9 males, and for every 100 females age 18 and over there were 116.3 males age 18 and over.

97.3% of residents lived in urban areas, while 2.7% lived in rural areas.

There were 1,700 households in Williamsburg, of which 31.0% had children under the age of 18 living in them. Of all households, 32.8% were married-couple households, 22.9% were households with a male householder and no spouse or partner present, and 38.1% were households with a female householder and no spouse or partner present. About 36.3% of all households were made up of individuals and 15.9% had someone living alone who was 65 years of age or older.

There were 1,932 housing units, of which 12.0% were vacant. The homeowner vacancy rate was 0.7% and the rental vacancy rate was 5.0%.

Racial composition as of the 2020 census
Race	Number	Percent
White	4,461	83.8%
Black or African American	448	8.4%
American Indian and Alaska Native	7	0.1%
Asian	86	1.6%
Native Hawaiian and Other Pacific Islander	10	0.2%
Some other race	103	1.9%
Two or more races	211	4.0%
Hispanic or Latino (of any race)	208	3.9%

=== 2000 census ===
As of the census of 2000, there were 5,143 people, 1,928 households, and 1,127 families residing in the city. The population density was 1,102.5 inhabitants per square mile (425.7/km^{2}). There were 2,118 housing units at an average density of 454.0 per square mile (175.3/km^{2}). The racial makeup of the city was 96.46% White, 1.73% African American, 0.21% Native American, 0.35% Asian, 0.02% Pacific Islander, 0.12% from other races, and 1.11% from two or more races. Hispanic or Latino of any race were 0.66% of the population.

There were 1,928 households, out of which 26.5% had children under the age of 18 living with them, 38.9% were married couples living together, 16.9% had a female householder with no husband present, and 41.5% were non-families. 35.6% of all households were made up of individuals, and 14.6% had someone living alone who was 65 years of age or older. The average household size was 2.20 and the average family size was 2.87.

In the city, the population was spread out, with 19.5% under the age of 18, 24.9% from 18 to 24, 22.2% from 25 to 44, 18.4% from 45 to 64, and 15.0% who were 65 years of age or older. The median age was 30 years. For every 100 females, there were 85.1 males. For every 100 females age 18 and over, there were 80.2 males.

The median income for a household in the city was $18,114, and the median income for a family was $25,996. Males had a median income of $31,905 versus $17,339 for females. The per capita income for the city was $11,224. About 29.3% of the population and 35.4% of the population were below the poverty line, including 49.0% of those under the age of 18 and 15.1% of those ages 65 and older.

== Education ==
=== K-12 ===
Two public school districts serve the city:

- Whitley County Schools
  - The county school district serves the county outside of the city of Williamsburg, however, its central campus is only a mile outside the city limits.
    - Whitley County High School (Grades 9–12)
    - Whitley County Middle School (Grades 7–8)
    - Whitley Central Intermediate School (Grades 3–6)
    - Whitley County Central Primary School (Grades Pre-K-2)
- Williamsburg Independent Schools
  - Serves the city of Williamsburg with a single K-12 school.
    - Williamsburg Independent School District

In addition, Corbin Education Center serves as an alternative school for students in the Corbin, Williamsburg, and Whitley County school districts.

=== Colleges and universities ===
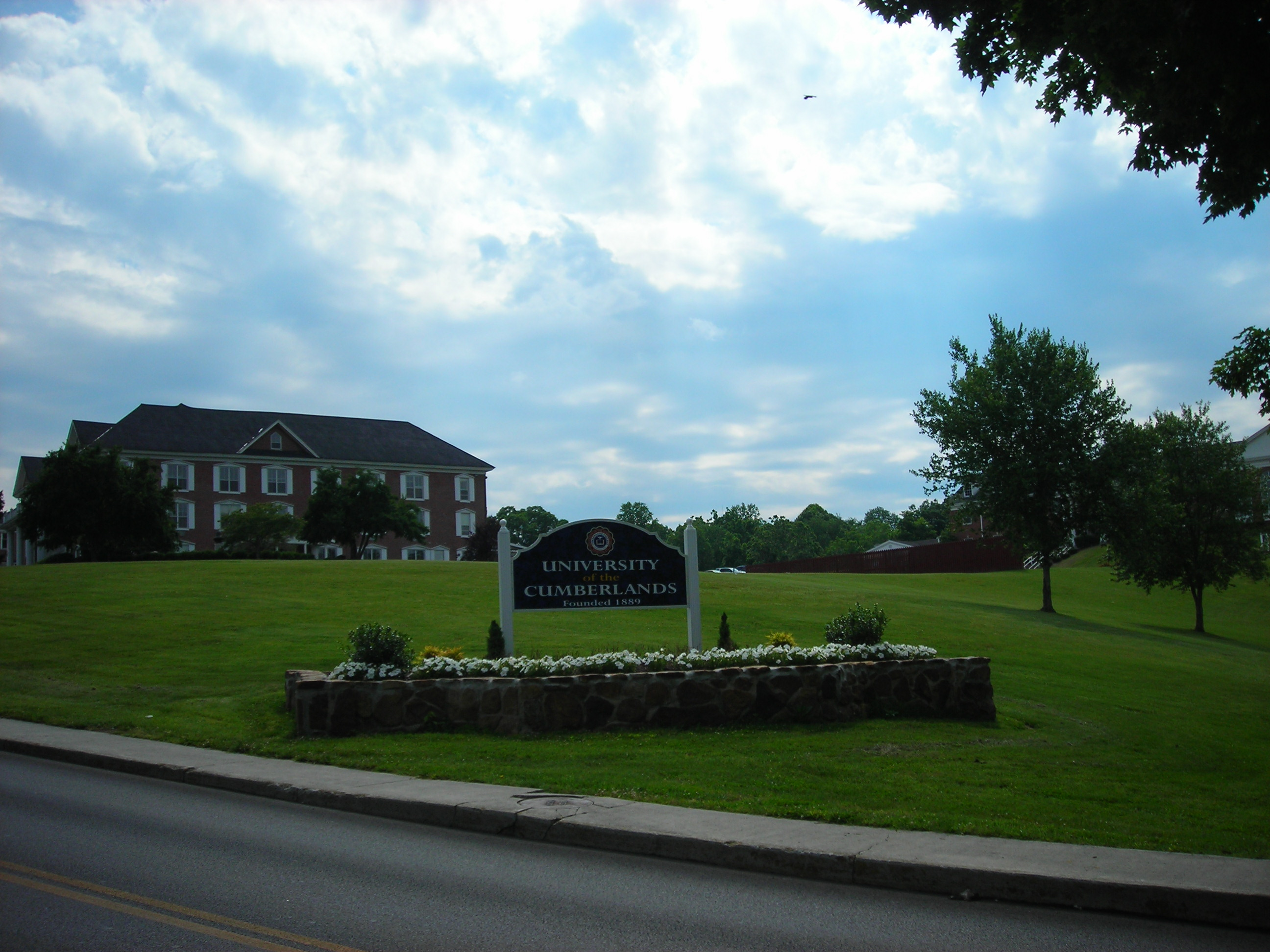
University of the Cumberlands marker off of Main Street, in Williamsburg, Kentucky

The main campus of the University of the Cumberlands (formerly Cumberland College) is located on College Hill adjacent to the downtown area of Williamsburg. UC is a private liberal arts college, with an enrollment of approximately 2,200 students. Its sports teams participate in the NAIA. The school was formerly affiliated with the Kentucky Baptist Convention (the Kentucky affiliate of the Southern Baptist Convention) and, since 2018, operates as an independent, Christian-based university.

=== Library ===
Williamsburg has a lending library, the Whitley County Public Library.

== Media ==
=== Newspapers ===
- News Journal – Weekly
- The Times-Tribune – Twice weekly
- The Patriot – College newspaper (University of the Cumberlands)

=== Radio ===
- WCCR-LP 94.5 FM (low power) – College radio (University of the Cumberlands)
- WNLW-LP 95.1 FM (low power) - Christian radio, 3ABN Radio network affiliate
- WEKX 102.7 FM – Classic Rock
- WEZJ 104.3 FM – Country
- WEKC 710 AM – Gospel
- WEZJ 1440 AM – Country

== Notable people ==
- Bert T. Combs, 50th Kentucky governor and University of the Cumberlands alumni
- Patricia Neal, stage and screen actress, born in nearby Packard Coal Camp; lived in Williamsburg's Gatliff House at one point.
- Joe C. Paul, United States Marine and Medal of Honor recipient
- Eugene Edward Siler, Jr., United States federal appellate judge
- Nick Wilson, winner of Survivor: David vs. Goliath
