= Gatliff, Kentucky =

Unincorporated community in Kentucky, United States

Gatliff
- Unincorporated community
- Location within the state of Kentucky Gatliff (the United States)
- Coordinates: 36°40′54″N 84°1′35″W
- Country: United States
- State: Kentucky
- County: Whitley
- Elevation: 1,001 ft (305 m)
- Time zone: UTC-5 (Eastern (EST))
  - Summer (DST): UTC-4 (EST)
- GNIS feature ID: 512289

Gatliff is an unincorporated community and coal town located in Whitley County, Kentucky, United States.

A post office was established in the community in 1908 and named for physician and mine proprietor Dr. Ancil Gatliff.
