= Fourmile, Kentucky =

Unincorporated community in Kentucky, United States

Fourmile
- Unincorporated community
- Location within Kentucky
- Coordinates: 36°47′33″N 83°44′34″W
- Country: United States
- State: Kentucky
- County: Bell
- Elevation: 1,001 ft (305 m)
- Time zone: UTC-5 (Eastern)
- ZIP code: 40939

Fourmile is an unincorporated community located in Bell County, Kentucky. it sits on both U.S. Route 25E and Kentucky State Route 92 where they both intersect.

Fourmile appears on the Pineville U.S. Geological Survey Map.

== Geography ==
Fourmile is located at 36°47′33″N 83°44′34″W. Fourmile is along the Cumberland River.

== History ==
A post office was established in the community in 1899. The origins of the name Fourmile are disputed: some hold it is because of hamlet's location four miles downriver from Pineville, while others believe it was named after the four-mile length of nearby Fourmile Creek.
