= University of the Cumberlands =

Christian university in Williamsburg, Kentucky, U.S.

Coordinates: 36.73713°N 84.16231°W

- Former names: Williamsburg Institute (1888–1913); Cumberland College (1913–2005)
- Motto: Vita Abundantior
- Motto in English: A Life More Abundant
- Type: Private
- Established: 1888; 138 years ago
- Religious affiliation: Christian
- Chancellor: Jerry Jackson
- President: Quentin Young
- Provost: Jennifer Simpson
- Students: 22,120 (fall 2024)
- Undergraduates: 7,612 (fall 2024)
- Postgraduates: 14,508 (fall 2024)
- Location: Williamsburg, Kentucky, United States
- Campus: Rural
- Colors: Red, White & Blue
- Nickname: Patriots
- Sporting affiliations: NAIA – Mid-South
- Mascot: Pete the Patriot
- Website: ucumberlands.edu
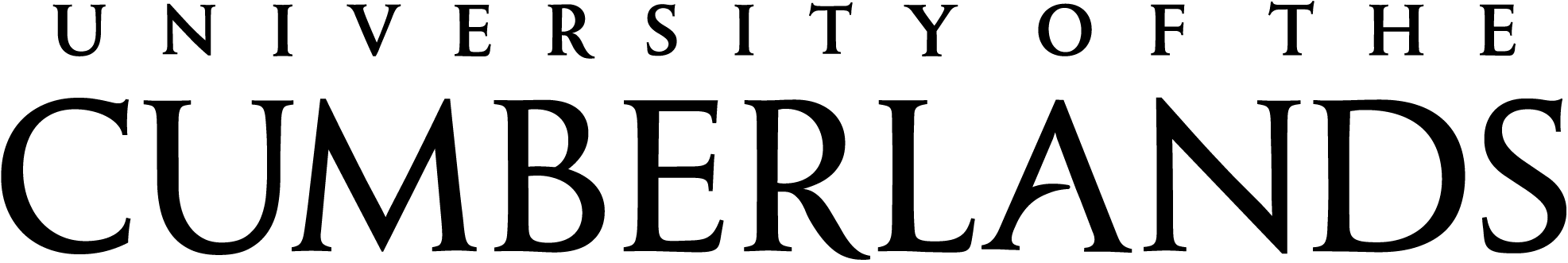

The University of the Cumberlands is a private Christian university in Williamsburg, Kentucky, United States. Over 25,000 students are currently enrolled at the university.

== History ==
University of the Cumberlands, first called "Williamsburg Institute", was founded on January 7, 1889. At the 1887 annual meeting of the Mount Zion Association, representatives from 18 eastern Kentucky Baptist churches discussed plans to provide higher education in the Kentucky mountains. The Kentucky state legislature incorporated the college on April 6, 1888. In 1907, the school bought the three buildings of "Highland College", and in 1913, Williamsburg Institute's name was changed to "Cumberland College". The name reflected the institution's location along the Cumberland River and its proximity to Cumberland Falls and the Cumberland Gap.

The institution was previously affiliated with the Southern Baptist Convention, and its mission has been to educate and prepare leaders for service to the greater community. Based on formerly being controlled by the Kentucky Baptist Convention and being bound by its policies, the university requested and received exemptions from Title IX in the areas of "admissions, recruitment, education programs or activities, and employment", allowing it to discriminate in those fields based on its views regarding "marriage, sex outside of marriage, sexual orientation, gender identity, pregnancy, and abortion." University of the Cumberlands sought, and received, a dissolution with the Kentucky Baptist Convention during the annual convention on November 12, 2018. The university described itself as a "private Baptist university" in its 2021 tax filings and marketed itself as an institution "grounded in Christian principles" as of the 2023–2024 academic year.

Although founded as a senior college, Cumberland College officially became a junior college in 1918. The college received its first accreditation from the Southern Association of Colleges and Schools (SACS) in 1931. In 1956, the college's board of trustees began restoring the college to senior college status. The junior year was added in 1959–60, and the senior year in 1960–1961. SACS granted initial accreditation to the institution as a senior college in December 1964.

Cumberland College received authority to award its first graduate degree, the Master of Arts in Education (MAED), on April 6, 1988. Graduate education has since become an integral part of the institution. In 2005, the institution received authorization from SACS to offer the Master of Arts in Teaching degree (MAT). This action was followed in 2006 with permission from the SACS Commission on Colleges to offer both the MAED and MAT degrees entirely online. More recently, in 2008, the commission also authorized granting the MBA degree, the Ed.S. degree, and the institution's first doctoral degree, an Ed.D. in Educational Leadership. Master's programs in Professional Counseling and Physician Assistant Studies were approved by SACS in 2009, and the Master of Arts in Christian Studies in 2010.

In 2004 then-president Larry Cockrum was caught in an academic scandal because he was awarded a fake degree from Crescent City Christian College. The incident occurred while Cockrum was employed at College of the Ozarks. The professor who questioned this degree was fired, while Larry Cockrum was allowed to resign. Cockrum later received a Ph.D. in higher education administration from Vanderbilt University and a post-graduate certification from Harvard University.

The following year, the American Association of University Professors (AAUP) censured the university, finding that then-President James Taylor coerced Professor Robert Day into resigning because he had opposed Taylor's proposed staff layoffs on an off-campus website. The AAUP concluded that "The policies of Cumberland College, including the grievance procedure, do not provide for faculty hearings of any kind. College policies and practices preclude any effective faculty role in academic governance and contribute to an atmosphere that stifles the freedom of faculty to question and criticize administrative decisions and actions." The AAUP noted that current and former faculty members "do not feel free to address topics of college concern in any forum" and "described a climate of fear about what faculty members may say and do, a fear based on what they know or have been told has happened to others". Those interviewed "expressed a particular fear that criticizing the administration and its operation of the college could place a faculty member's appointment in jeopardy".

On July 1, 2005, the institution's trustees changed the institution's name to the University of the Cumberlands.

Ten presidents have led the college, including William James Johnson; E. E. Wood; John Newton Prestridge; Gorman Jones, acting president; A. R. Evans, acting president; Charles William Elsey; James Lloyd Creech; J. M. Boswell; James H. Taylor; Larry L. Cockrum and Quentin Young.

Notable alumni include two governors, five military generals, and five college and university presidents.

=== Beliefs and policies on homosexuality ===
The university's beliefs about and policies on homosexuality have proven controversial on many occasions. In 2006, the Kentucky state budget included $10 million of state debt to construct a pharmacy building on the university's Whitley County campus. Additionally, $1 million for scholarships for the pharmacy program were included. The $10 million building was to be funded out of a $100 million pool of money titled the "infrastructure for economic development fund for coal-producing counties." Money to repay the bond issuance would come from coal severance taxes. The Kentucky Fairness Alliance asked Governor Ernie Fletcher to veto the $11 million that state lawmakers approved for a planned pharmacy school. A gay Kentucky State Senator, Ernesto Scorsone, has indicated that he would oppose spending the funds already allocated for a new pharmacy school for the university based on the Johnson situation, stating "We should not be budgeting bigotry." "If the University of the Cumberlands does not change its policies and practices, we will have a state benefit that is only available to heterosexuals," Scorsone said. An additional complication was that the Accreditation Council for Pharmacy Education, the accrediting agency for all American pharmacy schools, explicitly prohibits discrimination against gays. Its guideline stated that approved schools must have a policy on student affairs, including admissions and progression, that assures non-discrimination on the basis of race, religion, gender, lifestyle, national origin, or disability. As of July 1, 2007, this was revised to include the phrase "sexual orientation."

That same year, undergraduate student Jason Johnson of Lexington, Kentucky was forced to withdraw from the university after mentioning that he is gay on the social networking site MySpace.com. Then-university president James H. Taylor said in a written statement, "At University of the Cumberlands, we hold students to a higher standard than does society in general...University of the Cumberlands isn't for everyone. We tell prospective students about our high standards before they come." The student handbook, as revised in 2005, states that students can be removed from campus for participating in pre-marital sex or promoting homosexuality — a policy which Johnson's attorney alleged was added after Johnson decided to go to school at UC. A week and a half after initially withdrawing from the university, Johnson's attorney and the university reached a settlement allowing Johnson to complete his coursework for the semester and restoring his previous grades rather than downgrading them to failing. The university agreed to not report to other universities that Johnson was expelled. In addition, Johnson waived his right to sue the university, although he retained his right to file a grievance with the Department of Education or the Southern Association for Colleges and Schools.

In 2007, the pro-Gay and Lesbian rights group Soulforce brought its 2007 Equality Ride to Cumberlands' campus. According to the group's website, "through dialogue with administrators, faculty and students, the young activists of the 2007 Equality Ride will make clear the harmful effects of the false notion that homosexuality is a 'sickness and a sin.' To make public their case for equality, the young activists on the Equality Ride will hold vigils, Bible studies, class discussions, community forums, and press conferences."

According to the university, an offer was extended to the group to be located in the middle level of the Boswell Campus Center, but Soulforce rejected those terms. However, according to Soulforce, an offer from the university was quickly withdrawn because of a miscommunication and the university later refused to agree to terms in writing. Two University of the Cumberlands students were arrested by Williamsburg police on a charge of failure to disperse, along with a member of the Soulforce group, for trespassing and failure to disperse when they stopped on the sidewalk of Main Street, which runs through the campus.

The college was granted an exception to Title IX in 2015 which allows it to legally discriminate against LGBT students for religious reasons.

== Campus ==
University of the Cumberlands' campus is in the southeastern part of Kentucky, just off Interstate 75, 190 miles (310 km) south of Cincinnati, Ohio, and 70 miles (110 km) north of Knoxville, Tennessee.

=== Notable buildings ===
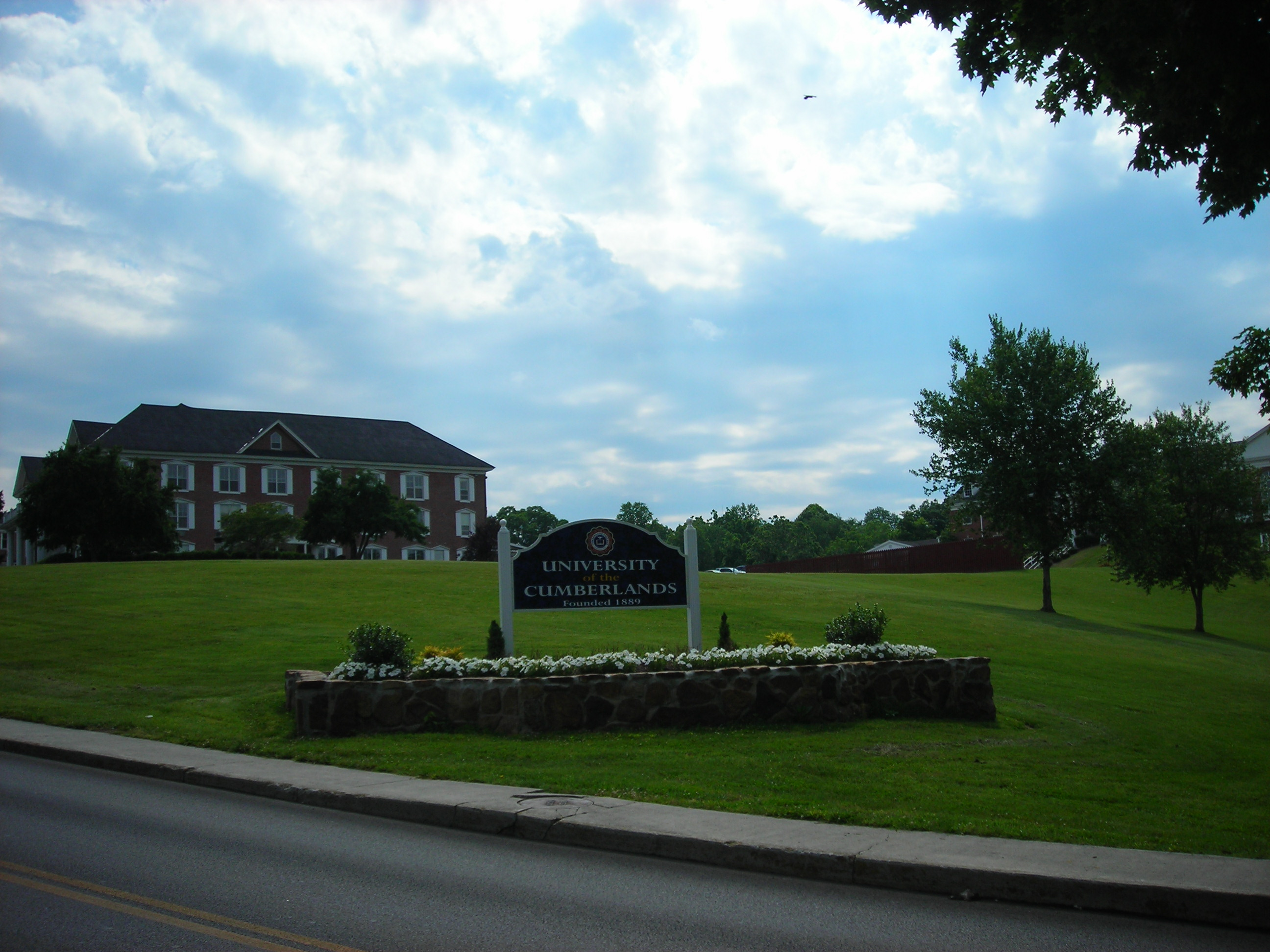
University of the Cumberlands marker off of Main Street, in Williamsburg, Kentucky

- Roburn Hall: The first building on the campus, Roburn Hall has been used as a classroom building and a women's and men's residence hall. It is now a women's residence hall.
- Gillespie Hall: Originally called Johnson Hall, the women's residence was the second building built by Williamsburg Institute.
- Mahan Hall: Built in 1907 as Felix Hall, Mahan was the first men's residence.
- Clyde V. and Patricia Bennett Building: Formerly known as the Gray Brick Building, the Bennett Building was built in 1906 by Highland College. Highland and Cumberland merged in 1907.
- Ruby Gatliff Archer President's Home: Built in 1905 as a replica of the "Kentucky Home" at the 1904 World's Fair in St. Louis. It is the residence of the president of the university.
- Edward L. Hutton School of Business: Built in 2004 as a replica of Independence Hall in Philadelphia.
- Cumberland Inn and Conference Center: Hotel and conference center run by the school. Primarily employs UC students.
  - Patriot Steakhouse, formerly the Athenaeum Restaurant: Highly rated restaurant inside the Cumberland Inn. Reviewed in Eating Your Way Across Kentucky: 101 Must Places To Eat (2006).
  - The Cumberland Inn Museum is operated by the school, located in the Cumberland Inn. It includes the Henkelmann Life Science Collection, the Carl Williams Cross Museum (one of the world's largest collections of crosses) and the University of the Cumberlands Archives.
- Ward and Regina Correll Science Complex: In May 2007, $1 million expansion of the Science Complex was started. The new addition is a replica of Thomas Jefferson's Monticello mansion. Classes began in the Correll Science Complex in January 2009.
- Lenora Fuson Harth Hall: New men's residence in the former location of Boswell Park, adjacent to Gillespie Hall. Construction began in August 2007. The hall opened in spring 2009.

Plans are also underway for an addition to the Boswell Campus Center and remodeling the current structure. These plans include a student recreation center complete with a rock wall, along with adding a thatched roof in order to blend in with the other buildings on campus. Phase 1 began in May, 2010.

== Academics ==
University of the Cumberlands is accredited by the Southern Association of Colleges and Schools Commission on Colleges to award baccalaureate, master's, and doctoral degrees. The university is divided into four colleges: Cumberland College (the university's undergraduate school), the Hutton School of Business/Management, the Hutton Center for Leadership Studies, and the Graduate/Professional Education program.

=== Undergraduate programs ===
Cumberlands offers approximately 45 major undergraduate programs as well as a variety of minor programs. UC recently began offering majors in Journalism and Public Relations, Criminal Justice, and Spanish. It also offers 12 academic national honor societies for students in several majors.

=== Graduate programs ===
The university offers several master's degrees, including programs in Education (MAEd), Psychology (MAPC), Business Administration (MBA), Physician Assistant Studies (MSPA), and Christian Studies (MACS), as well as an Educational Specialist program. It also offers several PhD programs, as well as an EdD and a DBA program.

==== Northern Kentucky Campus ====
In addition to the main campus in Williamsburg, UC operates a Northern Kentucky facility in Florence, Kentucky, just south of Cincinnati, Ohio. The location was originally secured to offer more clinical rotations in mental healthcare for doctoral psychology students. This satellite campus currently houses the School of Lifelong Learning and the Ph.D. Program in Clinical Psychology. The university has also indicated that this campus may be the eventual home of the Master's program in Physician Assistant Studies.

== Athletics ==
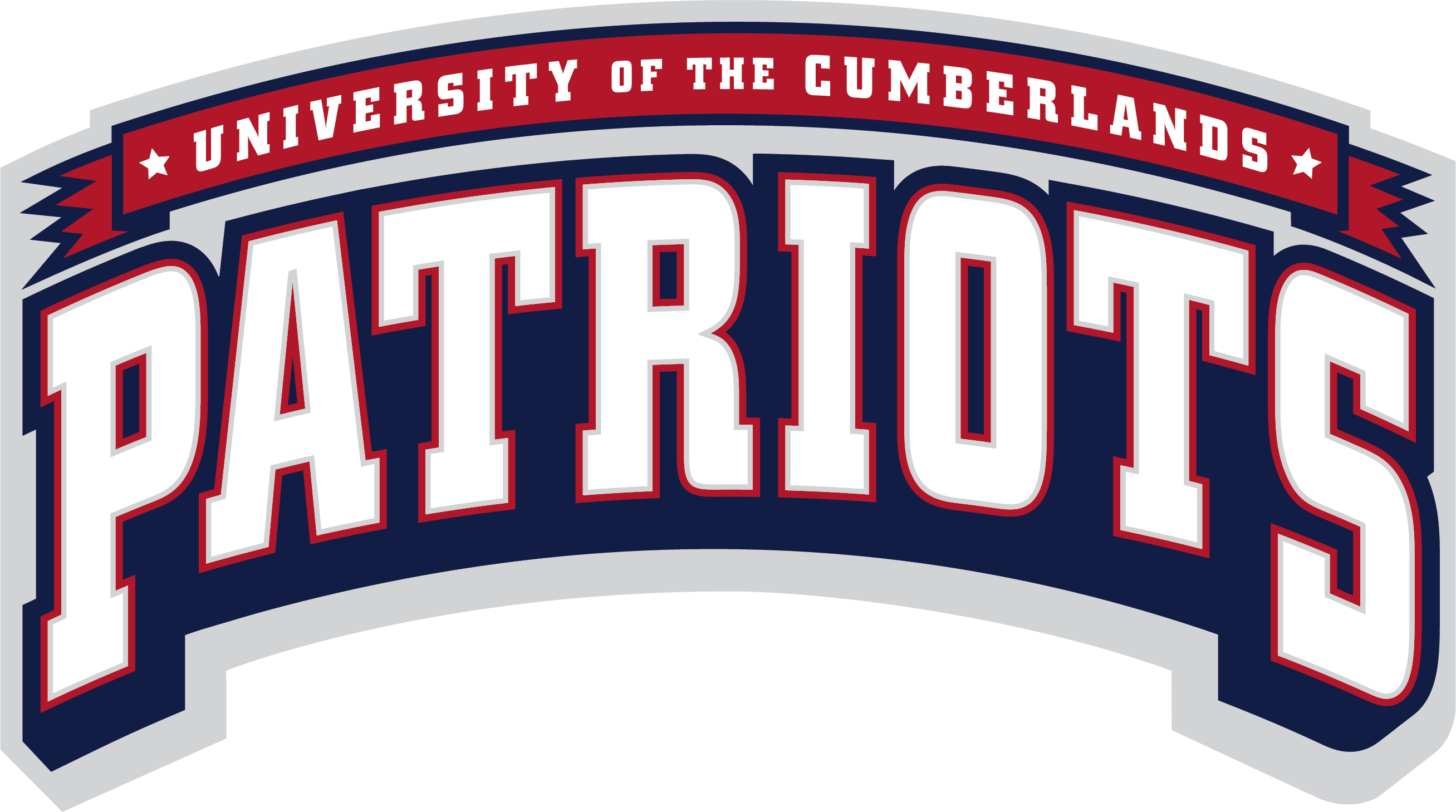
Cumberlands Patriots wordmark

The Cumberlands athletic teams are called the Patriots (after switching from their original nickname, the Indians). The university is a member of the National Association of Intercollegiate Athletics (NAIA), primarily competing in the Mid-South Conference (MSC) for most of its sports since the 1995–96 academic year; while its men's lacrosse team competes in the Appalachian Athletic Conference (AAC). The Patriots previously competed in the Kentucky Intercollegiate Athletic Conference (KIAC; currently known as the River States Conference (RSC) since the 2016–17 school year) from 1966–67 to 1994–95.

Cumberlands competes in 28 intercollegiate varsity sports: Men's sports include baseball, basketball, bowling, cross country, football, golf, lacrosse, soccer, swimming & diving, tennis, track & field and wrestling; while women's sports include basketball, bowling, cross country, golf, lacrosse, soccer, softball, swimming & diving, tennis, track & field, volleyball and wrestling; and co-ed sports include archery, cheerleading, dance, and eSports.

== Student life ==
The university has a campus newspaper, The Patriot, and a local cable television station, UCTV channel 19. The university had a low-power FM radio station, WCCR-LP, from 2004 until 2022. It also has a forensics (debate) team and an academic team.

The university typically has two theatre productions each year, one play (commonly in the spring, though reversed for the 2008 semesters) and one musical (currently in the spring, previously in the fall).

The university has other extracurricular student activities, including Campus Activity Board (CAB), chapters of College Republicans and College Democrats, Fellowship of Christian Athletes (FCA), Residence Hall Councils, Student Government Association, Baptist Campus Ministries (BCM), and many other clubs and organizations.

UC has 12 chapters of national honor societies in fields such as Biology (Beta Beta Beta), First Year Students (Alpha Lambda Delta) Theology and Religion (Theta Alpha Kappa), Business (Sigma Beta Delta and Phi Beta Lambda), and other academic fields.

University of the Cumberlands provides opportunities for campus ministry through Baptist Campus Ministries, Appalachian Ministries, Mountain Outreach, and Campus Family and Life groups.

All undergraduate students participate in community service before they graduate, developing a 40-hour community service project through their "Lead 101" class. Students who accumulate 200 or more hours of community service during their time at UC are designated "Hutton Scholars" and presented with certificates. Such students are recognized at their commencement ceremonies and can request a "leadership transcript". Many campus organizations provide opportunities for community service, including Student Government Association, the Academic Resource Center (ARC), Campus Activity Board, The Patriot campus newspaper, and Resident Assistant positions.

== Notable alumni ==
- Ergun Caner, president of Liberty Theological Seminary, part of Liberty University
- Bert T. Combs, Governor of Kentucky
- Mike Duncan, chairman of the Republican National Committee and governor of the United States Postal Service
- Juli Fulks, college basketball coach
- Derek Lewis (politician), politician
- Edward Liddie, judoka, 1984 Summer Olympics bronze medalist in judo
- Toccara Montgomery, college and Olympic wrestler
- Edwin P. Morrow, Governor of Kentucky
- Joseph F. Perugino, US Army major general
- Jean Ritchie, folk musician, singer, and songwriter who played the Appalachian dulcimer
- Betty L. Siegel, president of Kennesaw State University
- Eugene Siler, U.S. Representative from Kentucky
- Rick Stansbury, college basketball coach
- Dick Tunney, contemporary Christian artist/songwriter
- Leo White, judoka, 1984 and 1992 Summer Olympics
- Wendall Williams, professional football player
- J. Madison Wright, child actress
- Cat Zingano, college wrestler and professional mixed martial arts fighter
