= Chris Hanson (American football) =

American football player and coach (born 1976)

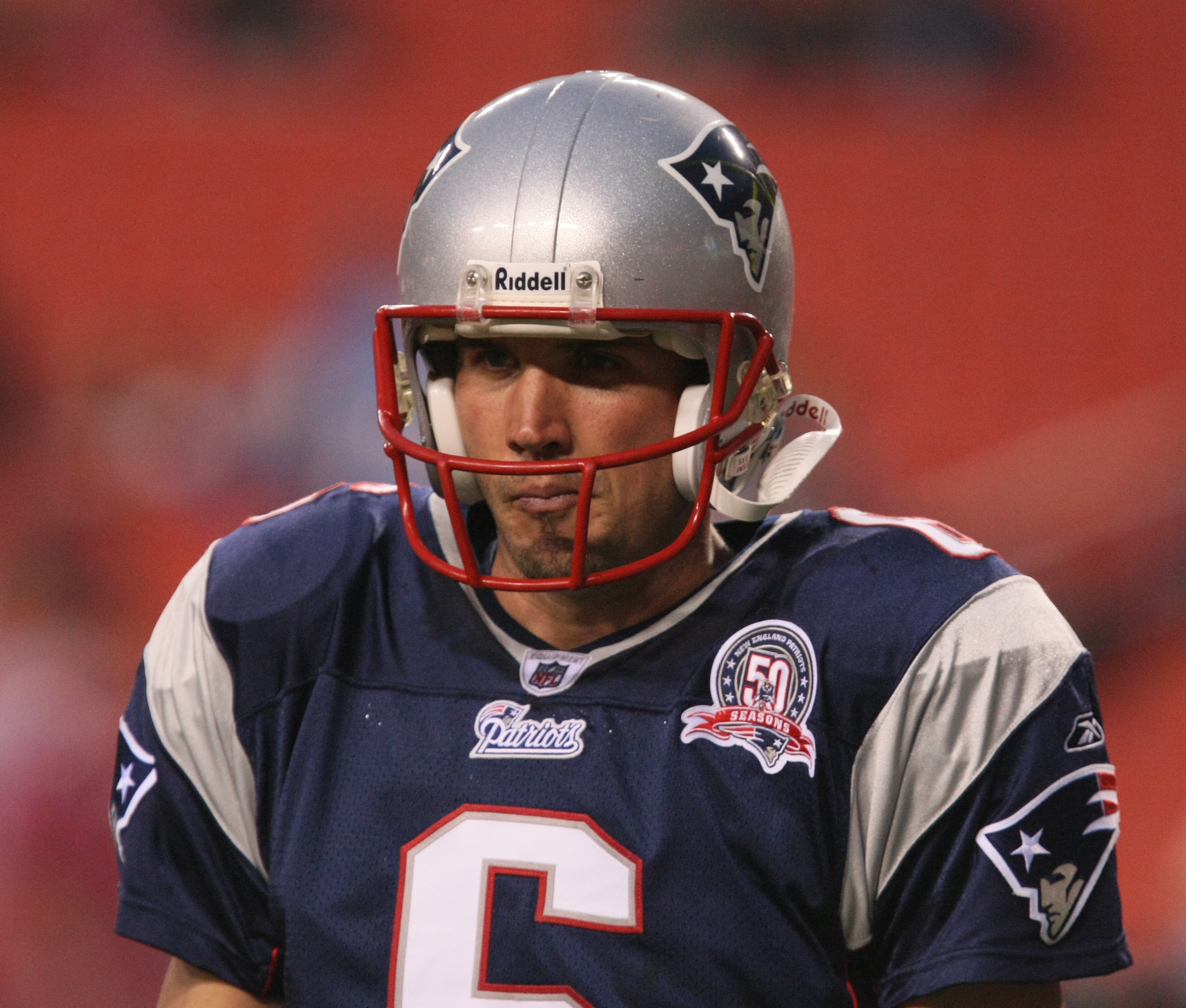
- Hanson with the New England Patriots in 2009

No. 7, 2, 6
- Position: Punter

Personal information
- Born: October 25, 1976 (age 50); Riverdale, Georgia, U.S.
- Listed height: 6 ft 2 in (1.88 m)
- Listed weight: 202 lb (92 kg)

Career information
- High school: East Coweta (Sharpsburg, Georgia)
- College: Marshall
- NFL draft: 1999: undrafted

Career history
- Cleveland Browns (1999)*; Green Bay Packers (1999); Miami Dolphins (1999)*; Barcelona Dragons (2000); Miami Dolphins (2000); Jacksonville Jaguars (2001–2006); New Orleans Saints (2007)*; New England Patriots (2007–2009)
- * Offseason or practice squad member only

Awards and highlights
- Second-team All-Pro (2002); Pro Bowl (2002); NCAA I-AA national champion (1996)

Career NFL statistics
- Punts: 577
- Punting yards: 24,532
- Punting average: 42.5
- Stats at Pro Football Reference

Christopher David Hanson (born October 25, 1976) is an American former professional football player who was a punter for 10 seasons in the National Football League (NFL). He played college football for the Marshall Thundering Herd, and was signed by the Cleveland Browns as an undrafted free agent in 1999. He also played for the Green Bay Packers, Miami Dolphins, Jacksonville Jaguars, New Orleans Saints and New England Patriots. Hanson is perhaps best known for a season-ending injury sustained while swinging a motivational axe in the Jaguars' locker room in 2003. Hanson was a switch-punter, able to effectively kick with both his left and his right leg, which he alternated to reduce fatigue.

== Early life ==
Hanson attended East Coweta High School in Sharpsburg, Georgia, where he played place kicker, punter, and receiver for head coach Danny Cronic.

== College career ==
Hanson attended Marshall University and was a four-year letterman in football as a punter. He finished his college football career with an average of 39.9 yards per punt. Hanson helped lead the Thundering Herd to the 1996 NCAA Division I-AA national championship.

== Professional career ==
=== Cleveland Browns ===
Hanson was signed as an undrafted free agent by the Cleveland Browns following the 1999 NFL draft. He was waived by the team following training camp.

=== Green Bay Packers ===
The Green Bay Packers signed Hanson on September 1, 1999. After punting for the Packers in their regular season opener, Hanson was released by the team and re-signed to the team's practice squad. He was waived from the Packers' practice squad on October 12, 1999.

=== Miami Dolphins ===
On December 29, 1999, Hanson signed to the Miami Dolphins' practice squad, but released from it the next day. He was later re-signed to a future contract for the 2000 season. He was allocated to the Barcelona Dragons of NFL Europe for the spring. After suffering an injury in the Dragons' season finale, Hanson was placed on injured reserve by the Dolphins on August 22, 2000. He was released by the Dolphins on August 14, 2001.

=== Jacksonville Jaguars ===
Four days after being waived by the Dolphins, Hanson signed for the Jacksonville Jaguars on August 18, 2001. He played in every game for the Jaguars in 2001, finishing sixth in the NFL in punt yard average. After being re-signed in the offseason, Hanson posted an NFL-best 44.2 gross punt average in 2002, earning his first Pro Bowl election. Hanson nearly matched his average during the first nine games of the 2003 season, posting a 43.5 yard average in that period. Later in the year, Jaguars coach Jack Del Rio placed a wooden stump and axe in the locker room as a symbol of his theme advising players to "keep choppin' wood". After his teammates took swings at the wood with the axe, Hanson followed and ended up seriously wounding his non-kicking foot. He was placed on injured reserve on October 10, keeping him out the rest of the season.

Hanson returned for the 2004 season, posting a 42.8 gross punting average over 16 games. Hanson was named AFC Special Teams Player of the Month in September 2005, with four punts downed inside the 20-yard line during that period. He helped the Jaguars to a 12–4 record, and a trip to the 2005 Wild-Card playoffs. However, Hanson's gross average dropped in 2006 to 40.6, and the Jaguars decided to draft a punter, Adam Podlesh, in the fourth round of the 2007 NFL draft. Hanson was released by the Jaguars shortly after the draft, on May 1, 2007.

=== New Orleans Saints ===
Hanson was signed by the New Orleans Saints on May 7, 2007, but released by the team during roster cutdowns on August 28.

=== New England Patriots ===
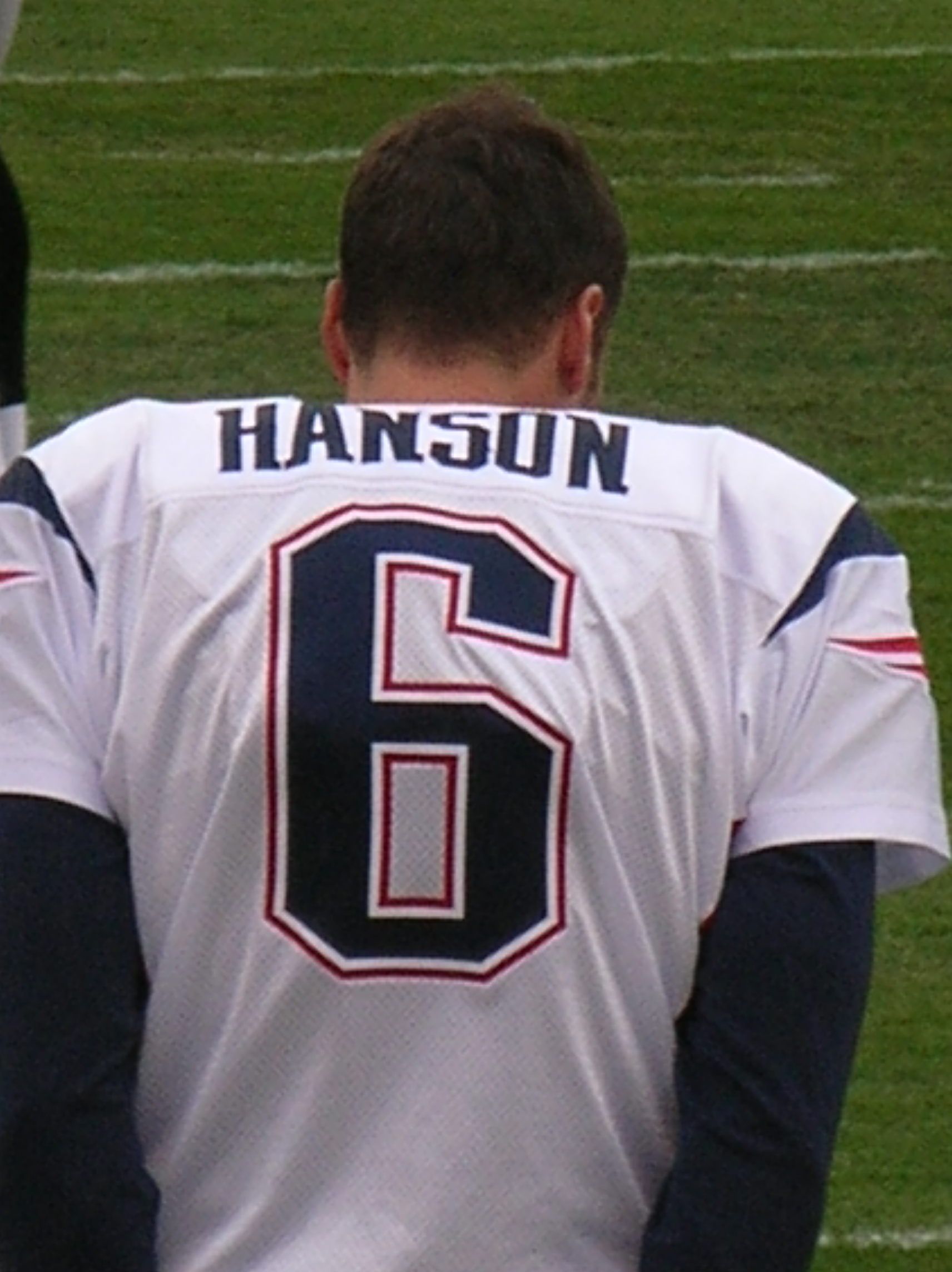
Hanson on the sidelines during a 2008 game.

In their 2007 training camp, the Patriots' punting competition appeared to be between veteran Josh Miller and first-year player Danny Baugher. By late August, the team had released Miller, leaving only Baugher on the roster. Baugher too was released days later, with the Patriots signing Hanson to replace him. Hanson had a 41.4 punting average for the Patriots in 2007. He helped lead the 2007 Patriots to a 16–0 regular season record, an AFC Championship, and a trip to Super Bowl XLII. In 2008, Hanson finished with a 43.7 punt average and was named AFC Special Teams Player of the Week in Week 17, averaging 45 yards a punt in wind gusts up to 60 mph. Hanson finished the 2009 season with a 39.7 punt average, helping the Patriots win the 2009 AFC East Division title.

New England did not re-sign Hanson for the 2010 season, leaving him as a free agent.

== Coaching career ==
Hanson was named head football coach at Trinity Christian School (Sharpsburg, Georgia) in 2011 after spending one year as an assistant under his former high school coach, Danny Cronic.
