= Wil Lutz =

American football player (born 1994)

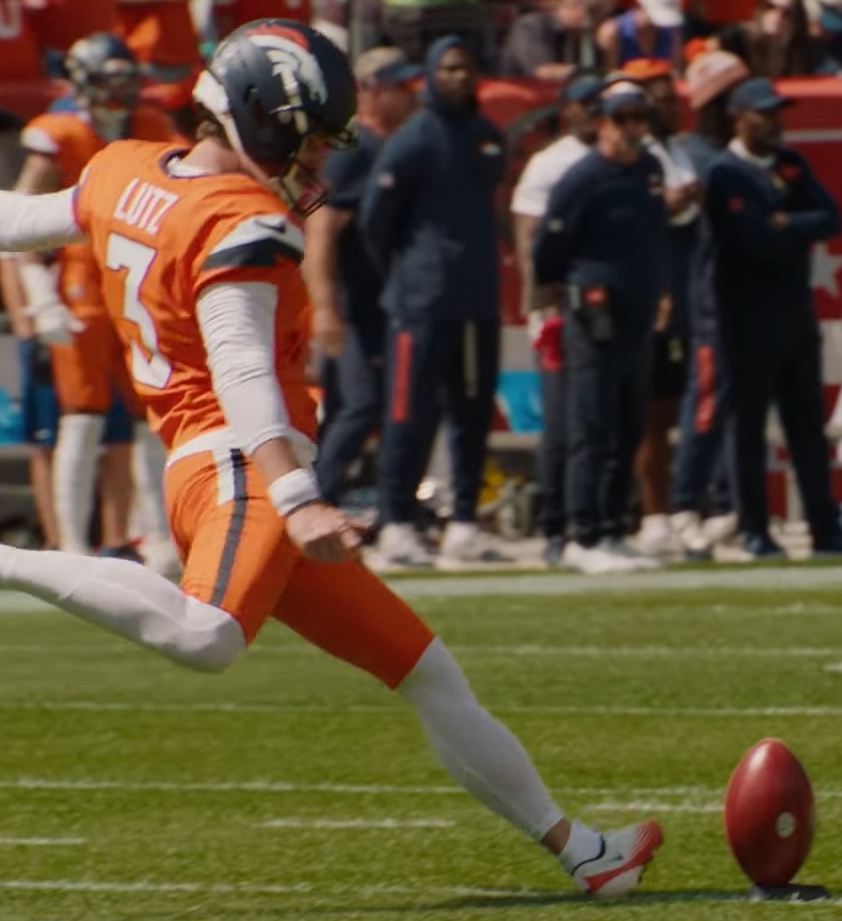
- Lutz with the Denver Broncos in 2025

No. 3 – Denver Broncos
- Position: Placekicker
- Roster status: Active

Personal information
- Born: July 7, 1994 (age 32); Newnan, Georgia, U.S.
- Listed height: 5 ft 11 in (1.80 m)
- Listed weight: 184 lb (83 kg)

Career information
- High school: Northgate (Newnan, Georgia)
- College: Georgia State (2012–2015)
- NFL draft: 2016: undrafted

Career history
- Baltimore Ravens (2016)*; New Orleans Saints (2016–2022); Denver Broncos (2023–present)
- * Offseason or practice squad member only

Awards and highlights
- Pro Bowl (2019); PFWA All-Rookie Team (2016); Second-team All-Sun Belt (2015); NFL records: Most consecutive extra point attempts converted: 117

Career NFL statistics as of Week 9, 2026
- Field goals made: 270
- Field goals attempted: 314
- Field goal %: 86.0%
- Longest field goal: 60
- Touchbacks: 533
- Stats at Pro Football Reference

William Lutz (born July 7, 1994) is an American professional football placekicker for the Denver Broncos of the National Football League (NFL). He played college football for the Georgia State Panthers and signed with the Baltimore Ravens as an undrafted free agent in 2016. Lutz has also played for the New Orleans Saints.

== Early life ==
Lutz was born on July 7, 1994, in Newnan, Georgia. Both his mother and father, Julie and Robert (Bob) Lutz, work in education and together have another son, Wesley. Julie served in various education jobs throughout Lutz's childhood, including as a principal of Canongate Elementary School in Sharpsburg, Georgia and more recently, as the Dean at Truett McConnell University in Cleveland, Georgia. Bob was a middle school science teacher at Madras Middle School in Newnan for a number of years.

Lutz attended Northgate High School in Newnan, where he competed in American football, soccer and cross country running. A two-time all-county placekicker, Lutz helped lead the Viking football team to an 11-1 record and region title during his senior season in 2011. The team defeated North Clayton High School in the first round of the Georgia AAAA football playoffs, before falling to East Paulding High School in the second round, concluding Lutz's high school football career. Lutz then enrolled at Georgia State University.

== College career ==
Lutz was the kickoff specialist during the 2012 season and became the placekicker for Georgia State after four games. At the end of the 2012 season, Lutz made 4-of-7 (57%) field goals and was a perfect 18-for-18 on extra points. Lutz attempted his first field goal against William & Mary. Lutz kicked a season-long 40-yard field goal against Rhode Island.

At the end of the 2013 season, Lutz made 8-of-12 (67%) field goals and 25-of-26 (96%) extra points for 49 points. Lutz kicked a school record 53-yard field goal against Alabama.

Lutz was named the punter as well midway through the 2014 season. Phil Steele named Lutz to the Midseason All-Sun Belt first team. Lutz finished the 2014 season kicking 7-for-8 (88%) on field goals and 35-for-35 on extra points. Lutz averaged 39.0 yards on 16 punts. Lutz kicked a 26-yard game-winning field goal with four seconds left to lift GSU to a 38–37 victory over Abilene Christian in the 2014 season-opener.

Lutz was the punter and the placekicker for the 2015 season. Lutz averaged 44.3 yards on 65 punts, the second-best season average in school history. Lutz ended the 2015 season kicking 12-for-19 (63%) on field goals and 42–43 (98%) on extra points for 78 total points. Lutz scored a career-high 11 points with two field goals and five extra points against Texas State.

== Professional career ==
Pre-draft measurables
| Height | Weight | Arm length | Hand span | Wingspan | Bench press |
|---|---|---|---|---|---|
| 5 ft 11 1/2 in (1.82 m) | 184 lb (83 kg) | 30 1/2 in (0.77 m) | 9 in (0.23 m) | 5 ft 9 1/2 in (1.77 m) | 12 reps |
All values from Pro Day

=== Baltimore Ravens ===
On May 5, 2016, Lutz signed with the Baltimore Ravens after going undrafted in the 2016 NFL draft. He was waived by the Ravens on August 29, 2016.

=== New Orleans Saints ===
On September 5, 2016, Lutz signed with the New Orleans Saints.

On September 18, 2016, against the New York Giants, Lutz had a field goal blocked by Johnathan Hankins, which was recovered by Janoris Jenkins for a Giants touchdown. On October 16, 2016, Lutz kicked a game-winning 52-yard field goal to defeat the Carolina Panthers, 41–38. On October 30, 2016, Lutz kicked a career-best four field goals against the Seattle Seahawks. Lutz earned National Football Conference (NFC) Special Teams Player of the Week honors in Week 6 and Week 8 of the 2016 season. The only other Saints rookies to win the honor twice in a season were punter Thomas Morstead and returner Reggie Bush. On December 18, 2016, Lutz made the 22nd and 23rd field goals of his rookie season, setting the record for the most field goals made by a rookie in franchise history. Lutz ended the season with 28 successful field goals. Lutz was named to the PFWA All-Rookie Team for 2016.

On September 11, 2017, Lutz tied his career high with four field goals in the season opening loss to the Minnesota Vikings on Monday Night Football.

On September 30, 2018, Lutz matched his career-high of four field goals, in a Week 4 victory over the Giants. Lutz was later named the NFC Special Teams Player of the Month for September 2018, having made 10 of 11 attempted field goals and 11 of 11 extra-point attempts.

On March 13, 2019, Lutz signed a five-year contract extension with the Saints.

In Week 1 of the 2019 season, against the Houston Texans, Lutz was a perfect 3-for-3 on extra points and 3-of-4 field goals. His 58-yard game-winning field goal was the longest game-winning field goal with no time remaining in the fourth quarter or overtime in a season opening game in NFL history. He was named NFC Special Teams Player of the Week for his performance.

In Week 2 of the 2020 season, against the Las Vegas Raiders on Monday Night Football, Lutz scored the first points in Allegiant Stadium history and the first ever points scored in the NFL in Las Vegas when he kicked a 31-yard field goal on the opening drive of the game. In Week 5 against the Los Angeles Chargers, Lutz was a perfect 3 for 3 on field goal attempts and 3 for 3 on extra point attempts (scoring a total of 12 points) during the 30–27 win. On October 14, 2020, Lutz was named the NFC Special Teams Player of the Week for his performance in Week 5.

On September 6, 2021, Lutz was placed on injured reserve.

Lutz returned from his injury for the 2022 season. He converted all 33 extra point attempts and 23 of 31 field goal attempts in 17 games.

=== Denver Broncos ===
==== 2023 season ====
On August 29, 2023, Lutz was traded to the Denver Broncos for a 2024 seventh-round pick. Lutz was named AFC Special Teams Player of the Month for November of the 2023 season. In the 2023 season, he converted 29 of 31 extra point attempts and 30 of 34 field goal attempts.

==== 2024 season ====
On March 12, 2024, Lutz signed a two-year contract extension with the Broncos. Lutz also stated he would change his number from 16 to 3, his number when he was with New Orleans after Russell Wilson was released.

In Week 3 of the 2024 season, Lutz converted four field goals and two extra points in a 26–7 win over the Tampa Bay Buccaneers, earning AFC Special Teams Player of the Week. Later that season in Week 12, Lutz earned another AFC Special Teams Player of the Week, connecting on all five field goals and both extra point tries, securing a 29–19 win over the Las Vegas Raiders.

Lutz became the fifth-fastest player in NFL history to reach the career 1,000-point mark, with an extra-point in a win against the Browns on Monday Night Football. He finished the 2024 season converting all 46 extra points and 31 of 34 field goal attempts.

==== 2025 season ====
In October 2025, Lutz was named the AFC Special Teams Player of the Month for the second time in his career after completing 100% of his field goal and extra point attempts, including a 57- and 55-yarder. He won AFC Special Teams Player of the Week for the Broncos' Week 11 win over the Kansas City Chiefs, going 5-for-5 on field goal attempts and kicking the game-winner.

On November 21, 2025, the Broncos signed Lutz to a three-year, $16.1 million contract extension. He finished the 2025 season converting all 39 extra point attempts and 28 of 32 field goal attempts.

== NFL career statistics ==
Legend
| | Led the league |
| **Bold** | Career high |

=== Regular season ===
| Year | Team | GP | Field goals | | | | Extra points | | | Points |
| Year | Team | GP | FGA | FGM | Lng | Pct | XPA | XPM | Pct | Points |
|---|---|---|---|---|---|---|---|---|---|---|
| 2016 | NO | 16 | 34 | 28 | 57 | 82.4 | 50 | 49 | 98.0 | 133 |
| 2017 | NO | 16 | **36** | 31 | 53 | 86.1 | 50 | 47 | 94.0 | 140 |
| 2018 | NO | 16 | 30 | 28 | 54 | **93.3** | 53 | 52 | 98.1 | 136 |
| 2019 | NO | 16 | **36** | **32** | 58 | 88.9 | 49 | 48 | 98.0 | **144** |
| 2020 | NO | 16 | 28 | 23 | 53 | 82.1 | **58** | **57** | 98.3 | 126 |
| 2021 | NO | 0 | Did not play due to injury | | | | | | | |
| 2022 | NO | 17 | 31 | 23 | **60** | 74.2 | 33 | 33 | **100.0** | 102 |
| 2023 | DEN | 17 | 34 | 30 | 52 | 88.2 | 31 | 29 | 93.5 | 119 |
| 2024 | DEN | 17 | 34 | 31 | 55 | 91.2 | 46 | 46 | **100.0** | 139 |
| 2025 | DEN | 17 | 32 | 28 | 57 | 87.5 | 39 | 39 | **100.0** | 123 |
| 2026 | DEN | 9 | 19 | 16 | 53 | 84.2 | 16 | 16 | **100.0** | 64 |
| Career | | 157 | 314 | 270 | 60 | 86.0 | 425 | 416 | 97.9 | 1,226 |

=== Postseason ===
| Year | Team | GP | Field goals | | | | Extra points | | | Points |
| Year | Team | GP | FGA | FGM | Lng | Pct | XPA | XPM | Pct | Points |
|---|---|---|---|---|---|---|---|---|---|---|
| 2017 | NO | 2 | 3 | 2 | **57** | 66.7 | **7** | **7** | 100.0 | 13 |
| 2018 | NO | 2 | **6** | **5** | 45 | **83.3** | 4 | 4 | 100.0 | **19** |
| 2019 | NO | 1 | 3 | 2 | 49 | 66.7 | 2 | 2 | 100.0 | 8 |
| 2020 | NO | 2 | 3 | 2 | 42 | 66.7 | 5 | 5 | 100.0 | 11 |
| 2024 | DEN | 1 | 1 | 0 | — | 0.0 | 1 | 1 | 100.0 | 1 |
| 2025 | DEN | 2 | **6** | 4 | 50 | 66.7 | 4 | 4 | 100.0 | 16 |
| Career | | 10 | 22 | 15 | 57 | 68.2 | 23 | 23 | 100.0 | 68 |
