= Danny Cronic =

American football coach (born c. 1947)

Biographical details
- Born: c. 1947 (age 78–79); Hull, Georgia, U.S.
- Education: University of Georgia (1968); Middle Tennessee State University

Playing career
- 1965–1966: Georgia
- 1970–1971: Clark Air Base
- Position: Quarterback

Coaching career (HC unless noted)
- 1969: Georgia (GA)
- 1971–1973: Cherokee HS (GA) (assistant)
- 1974–1977: Cherokee HS (GA)
- 1978–1979: Middle Tennessee (RB)
- 1980–1983: LaGrange HS (GA)
- 1984: West Georgia (OC)
- 1987–1989: Forsyth Central HS (GA)
- 1990–2007: East Coweta HS (GA)
- 2010: Heritage School (GA)
- 2011–2014: Reinhardt

Head coaching record
- Overall: 12–8 (college); 222–114–1 (high school)

Accomplishments and honors

Championships
- 1 MSC West Division (2013)

Daniel G. Cronic (born c. 1947) is an American former college football coach. He was the head football coach for Cherokee High School from 1974 to 1977, LaGrange High School from 1980 to 1983, Forsyth Central High School from 1987 to 1989, East Coweta High School from 1990 to 2007, The Heritage School in 2010, and Reinhardt University from 2011 to 2014.

== Playing career and military career ==
Cronic grew up in Hull, Georgia, and attended Madison County High School. He earned nine letters in four different sports. He graduated in 1965. After his graduation, he attended Georgia as a quarterback. He suffered a career-ending injury during his sophomore year in 1966. He earned his bachelor's degree in 1968.

After Cronic graduated from Georgia, he served in the United States Army as a lieutenant in special services. He served as the quarterback for the Clark Air Base football team while he was stationed in Okinawa. In 1971, his team made an appearance in the Bamboo Bowl.

== Coaching career ==
After Cronic's college playing career ended, he served as a graduate assistant for his alma mater, Georgia, in 1969 under his head coach Vince Dooley. After his discharge from the Army he joined Cherokee High School as an assistant to Bobby Pate. He was promoted to head football coach in 1974. His 1976 team went 7–3 which was their best record until that point.

In 1978, Cronic joined Middle Tennessee as he pursued his doctorate. He was the team's offensive backfield coach. After two seasons he was hired as the head football coach for LaGrange High School. He maintained that position for four seasons and amassed an overall record of 39–10. In his last season, 1983, he led his team to a 14–1 record with their only loss coming in the state championship against Tift County. He coached future National Football League (NFL) draft pick Nate Hill. In 1984, he rejoined the college ranks as the offensive coordinator as he rejoined Bobby Pate at West Georgia. In Cronic's lone season alongside head coach Bobby Pate, the team finished with a 3–8 record. After not coaching from 1985 to 1986 he was hired as the head football coach for Forsyth Central High School. He maintained that position for three years.

In 1990, Cronic was hired as the head football coach for East Coweta High School. In 1998, he led the team to a state championship. Two years later he led East Coweta to its second state championship under Cronic. In the following year he led the team to back-to-back state championships. He retired following the 2007 season as the school's all-time leader in wins with 149. He came out of retirement in 2010 for The Heritage School as the successor to Larry Harrison. He resigned after only one season after leading the team to a 4–6 record.

In 2011, Cronic was hired as the first head football coach for Reinhardt. After two non-varsity seasons in 2011 and 2012 he led the team to a 6–4 record in their first varsity season. They were co-Mid-South Conference (MSC) West Division champions. In 2014, he led the team to another winning record with a 6–4 record. He retired for the second time following the 2014 season. His son, Drew, was named as his successor.

== Personal life ==
Cronic married Margaret White and they had two children together. His eldest son, Drew, was the head football coach for Reinhardt, Lenoir–Rhyne, and Mercer.

During Cronic's break from coaching from 1985 to 1986, he was hired by a real estate firm.

== Head coaching record ==
=== College ===
Year	Team	Overall	Conference	Standing	Bowl/playoffs
Reinhardt Eagles (Mid-South Conference) (2013–2014)
2013	Reinhardt	6–4	4–1	T–1st (West)	
2014	Reinhardt	6–4	3–2	3rd (West)	
Reinhardt:		12–8	7–3		
Total:		12–8			

=== High school ===
Year	Team	Overall	Conference	Standing	Bowl/playoffs
Cherokee Warriors () (1974–1977)
1974	Cherokee	2–8	2–4		
1975	Cherokee	4–6	1–5		
1976	Cherokee	7–3	3–3		
1977	Cherokee	3–7	0–6		
Cherokee:		16–24	6–18		
LaGrange Grangers () (1980–1983)
1980	LaGrange	5–5	3–5		
1981	LaGrange	10–2	7–1		
1982	LaGrange	10–2	8–1		
1983	LaGrange	14–1	9–0	1st	
LaGrange:		39–10	27–7		
Forsyth Central Bulldogs () (1987–1989)
1987	Forsyth Central	4–5–1	0–0		
1988	Forsyth Central	6–4	2–4		
1989	Forsyth Central	5–5	1–5		
Forsyth Central:		15–14–1	3–9		
East Coweta Indians () (1990–2007)
1990	East Coweta	8–4	6–3		
1991	East Coweta	7–4	6–3		
1992	East Coweta	6–4	2–4		
1993	East Coweta	8–3	5–1		
1994	East Coweta	11–2	7–1		
1995	East Coweta	9–3	6–2		
1996	East Coweta	5–5	4–5		
1997	East Coweta	8–3	7–2		
1998	East Coweta	10–1	9–0	1st	
1999	East Coweta	8–3	8–1		
2000	East Coweta	12–1	7–0	1st	
2001	East Coweta	11–1	7–0	1st	
2002	East Coweta	9–5	6–1		
2003	East Coweta	7–4	5–2		
2004	East Coweta	6–5	4–2		
2005	East Coweta	7–5	4–2		
2006	East Coweta	6–5	3–3		
2007	East Coweta	10–2	5–1	2nd	
East Coweta:		148–60	101–33		
Heritage School Hawks () (2010)
2010	Heritage School	4–6	1–5	6th	
Heritage School:		4–6	1–5		
Total:		222–114–1			
National championship Conference title Conference division title or championship game berth
