= Ashley Park =

Ashley Park may refer to:

- Ashley Park (actress), American actress and musician
- Ashley Park, Surrey, private residential neighborhood in England
- West Ashley Park, park in South Carolina, US
- The Forum at Ashley Park, lifestyle center in Newnan, Georgia, US

== See also ==
- Ashley Rakahuri Regional Park
