= East Coweta School =

East Coweta School may refer to:

- East Coweta High School
- East Coweta Middle School
