= Annie R. Blount =

American writer (born 1839)

Annie R. Blount (pen names, various, including Jennie Woodbine; 1839–unknown) was a poet, short story writer, and newspaper editor of the American South. She began writing at an early age, and many of her juvenile productions appeared in print under various signatures. She received a prize offered by a literary paper published in New Bern, North Carolina, for "the best story by any American writer".

== Early life and education ==
Annie R. Blount was born in Richmond County, Virginia, on June 22, 1839. Blount's mother died after the family removed to Augusta, Georgia. She was subsequently raised by an enslaved woman, sometimes referred to as "Maumer" Rachael.

Until the age of 13, Blount was educated entirely at the country schools until the age of 13, when she joined the junior class of the Methodist Female College at Madison, Georgia. She graduated from the college at the age of 17 with the highest honors the institution could confer, the president stating to the trustees and audience that she was the most perfect scholar he had ever graduated. A satirical poem on "The Follies of the Age", which she delivered on commencement day, was extensively circulated through the Southern United States, and received honors.

== Career ==
Due to financial difficulties, Blount decided to earn a living as a writer. After her graduation, Blount assumed the editorial conduct of a literary paper, the Bainbridge Argus, which was widely circulated; she held the position for two years. In addition, she contributed to other Southern literary journals, including Southern Field and Fireside and Hygienic and Literary Magazine. In the Medical and Literary Weekly and elsewhere, she wrote under the name, "Jennie Woodbine".

Blount won several prizes for her poems and novelettes. She received a prize offered by a literary paper published in New Bern, North Carolina, for "the best story by any American writer". This story, "The Sisters", was printed in 1859, in the Newbern Gazette. Mr. T. A. Burke, then editor of the Savannah News, commented:—

"An examining committee, composed of W. Gilmore Simms, the eminent novelist, Rev. B. Craven, President of the Normal College, N. C., and John R. Thompson, editor of the 'Southern Literary Messenger,' have awarded the first prize, a one-hundred-dollar gold medal, to 'Jenny Woodbine,' alias Miss Annie R. Blount, of Augusta, Ga., 'for the best story,' to be published in a Southern paper. We know Miss Blount well, and her success as a writer, both of prose and verse, is what her decided talent induced us to expect She is young-probably the youngest writer of any reputation in the country, North or South — and, with proper study and care, she has much to expect in the future."

One summer, Blount was invited by the trustees and faculty of Le Vert College, Talbotton, Georgia, to deliver an original poem at their annual commencement. The next summer, Blount delivered a poem at the College Temple commencement, Newnan, Georgia. After the reading of the poem, the faculty of College Temple conferred on her the degree of "Mistress of Arts".

In 1860, Blount collected her poems and printed them in a book. The volume was dedicated to Alexander H. Stephens and issued by H. D. Norrell, Augusta, Georgia. The book sold well, and was highly complimented by the press.

Blount was a supporter of the Confederacy, during the American Civil War, and many of her relatives served in the Confederate Army. She reportedly wished to serve in Richmond, Virginia as a nurse, but was dissuaded by her friends, who were concerned for her health. Blount frequently visited hospitals in Augusta, along with the enslaved woman, Rachael, who had raised her.

== Personal life ==
In 1869, Blount was residing with her brother in Augusta.

Blount married John T. Perdue on July 9, 1871. He died in Georgia, October 1876.

== Awards and honors ==
- 1859, gold medal valued at a US$100, short prose sketch, "The Sisters", awarded by the Newbern Gazette.
- 1863, Best Poems not less than 60 lines, "Under the Lamp-Light", awarded by Southern Field and Fireside

== Selected works ==
- Poems, August, Georgia: H. D. Norell, 1860
