= Newnan, Georgia =

- City
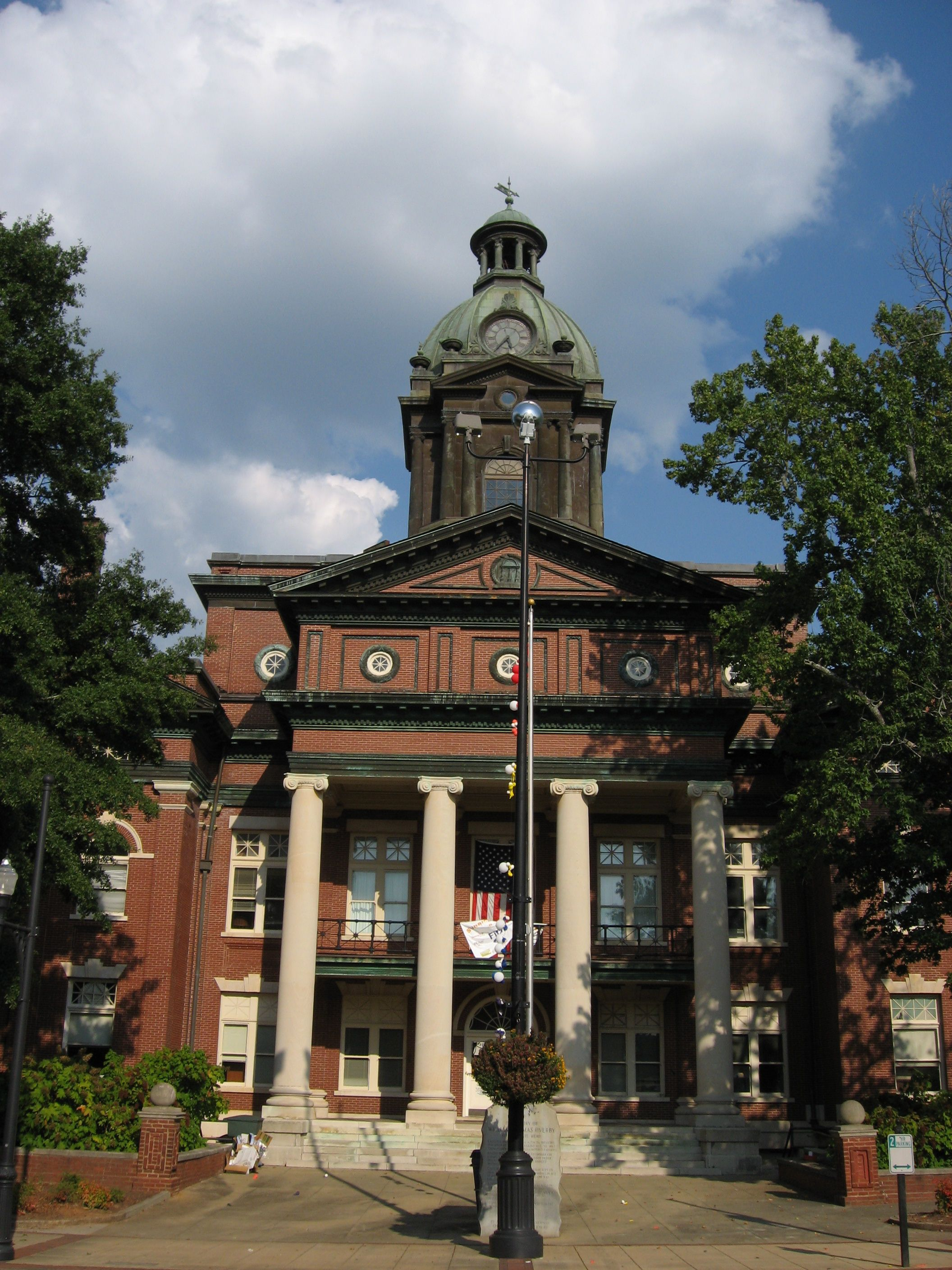
- Coweta County Courthouse

- Flag Seal Logo
- Motto: City of Homes
- Location in Coweta County and the state of Georgia

- Location of Newnan in Metro Atlanta
- Coordinates: 33°22′35″N 84°47′19″W
- Country: United States
- State: Georgia
- County: Coweta
- Incorporated (city): December 20, 1828

Area
  - Total: 19.82 sq mi (51.34 km^{2})
  - Land: 19.47 sq mi (50.44 km^{2})
  - Water: 0.35 sq mi (0.90 km^{2})
- Elevation: 971 ft (296 m)

Population (2020)
  - Total: 42,549
  - Density: 2,184.9/sq mi (843.58/km^{2})
- Time zone: UTC−5 (Eastern (EST))
  - Summer (DST): UTC−4 (EDT)
- ZIP Codes: 30263–30265, 30271
- Area codes: 770, 678
- FIPS code: 13-55020
- GNIS feature ID: 0332499
- Website: newnanga.gov

Newnan is a city in and the county seat of Coweta County, Georgia, United States, about 40 miles (64 km) southwest of Atlanta. Its population was 42,549 at the 2020 census, up from 33,039 in 2010.

== History ==
Newnan was established as county seat of Coweta County (replacing the defunct town of Bullsboro) in 1828, and was named for North Carolinian General Daniel Newnan. It quickly became a prosperous magnet for lawyers, doctors, other professionals, and merchants. Much of Newnan's prosperity was due to its thriving cotton industry, which relied on slavery.

Newnan was largely untouched by the Civil War due to its status as a hospital city (for both Union and Confederate troops), and as a result still features much antebellum architecture. During the Atlanta campaign, Confederate cavalry defeated Union forces at the nearby Battle of Brown's Mill. Subsequently, architect Kennon Perry (1890–1954) designed many of the town's early 20th-century homes.

On April 23, 1899, a lynching occurred after an African-American man by the name of Sam Hose (born Tom Wilkes) was accused of killing his boss, Alfred Cranford. Hose was abducted from police custody, paraded through Newnan, tortured, and burned alive just north of town by a lynch mob of roughly 2,000 citizens of Coweta County.

Newnan was also host to the trial in 1948 of wealthy landowner John Wallace, the first White man in the South to be condemned to death by the testimony of African Americans, two field hands who were made to help with burning the body of murdered white sharecropper Wilson Turner. These events were portrayed in the novel Murder in Coweta County.

In 1968, Kmart opened a warehouse in Newnan, which slowly established it as a major hub for distribution in the area. The International Brotherhood of Teamsters attempted to unionize the warehouse, but the attempt was defeated when the employees voted 329 to 201 in favor of remaining union-free. In 2015, the distribution center closed, resulting in a loss of 164 jobs.

=== 2021 tornado ===
In the early morning hours of March 26, 2021, Newnan was directly impacted by a violent EF4 tornado, which caused substantial structural damage and indirectly killed one person. The tornado was one of the strongest on record in Georgia since 1950, and directly impacted the historic downtown area. Newnan High School was re-built after sustaining serious damage.

== Geography ==
Newnan is located in the center of Coweta County. U.S. Route 29 passes through the center of the city, leading northeast 13 miles (21 km) to Palmetto and south 7 miles (11 km) to Moreland. Interstate 85 passes through the eastern side of the city, with access from exits 41, 44, and 47. I-85 leads northeast 40 miles (64 km) to downtown Atlanta and southwest 125 miles (201 km) to Montgomery, Alabama. U.S. Route 27A leads northwest from the center of Newnan 22 miles (35 km) to Carrollton.

According to the United States Census Bureau, Newnan has a total area of 18.6 square miles (48.3 km^{2}), of which 0.35 square miles (0.9 km^{2}), or 1.88%, is covered by water.

=== Climate ===
The climate is moderate with an average temperature of 64.3 °F (45.8° in the winter and 79.1° in the summer). The average annual rainfall is 51.84 inches.

Climate data for Newnan, Georgia
Month	Jan	Feb	Mar	Apr	May	Jun	Jul	Aug	Sep	Oct	Nov	Dec	Year
Mean daily maximum °F (°C)	52 (11)	58 (14)	65 (18)	73 (23)	80 (27)	86 (30)	89 (32)	88 (31)	83 (28)	73 (23)	64 (18)	55 (13)	72 (22)
Mean daily minimum °F (°C)	31 (−1)	33 (1)	40 (4)	47 (8)	56 (13)	64 (18)	68 (20)	67 (19)	62 (17)	49 (9)	41 (5)	33 (1)	49 (10)
Average precipitation inches (mm)	5.49 (139)	5.14 (131)	5.95 (151)	4.17 (106)	4.37 (111)	3.99 (101)	4.66 (118)	4.00 (102)	3.24 (82)	2.86 (73)	4.18 (106)	4.27 (108)	52.32 (1,329)
Average snowfall inches (cm)	0.8 (2.0)	0.5 (1.3)	0.4 (1.0)	0.1 (0.25)	0 (0)	0 (0)	0 (0)	0 (0)	0 (0)	0 (0)	0 (0)	0.2 (0.51)	2 (5.06)
Source: The Weather Channel

== Demographics ==
Historical population
Census	Pop.	Note	%±
1860	2,546		—
1870	1,917		−24.7%
1880	2,006		4.6%
1890	2,859		42.5%
1900	3,654		27.8%
1910	5,548		51.8%
1920	7,037		26.8%
1930	6,386		−9.3%
1940	7,182		12.5%
1950	8,218		14.4%
1960	12,169		48.1%
1970	11,205		−7.9%
1980	11,449		2.2%
1990	12,497		9.2%
2000	16,242		30.0%
2010	33,039		103.4%
2020	42,549		28.8%
2025 (est.)	45,867	▲	7.8%
U.S. Decennial Census

=== 2020 census ===
As of the 2020 census, Newnan had a population of 42,549. The median age was 35.7 years. 25.0% of residents were under the age of 18 and 13.1% of residents were 65 years of age or older. For every 100 females there were 87.8 males, and for every 100 females age 18 and over there were 84.1 males age 18 and over.

99.9% of residents lived in urban areas, while 0.1% lived in rural areas.

There were 16,618 households in Newnan, including 10,013 families; 35.0% had children under the age of 18 living in them. Of all households, 43.3% were married-couple households, 16.6% were households with a male householder and no spouse or partner present, and 34.1% were households with a female householder and no spouse or partner present. About 28.0% of all households were made up of individuals and 9.8% had someone living alone who was 65 years of age or older.

There were 17,771 housing units, of which 6.5% were vacant. The homeowner vacancy rate was 2.1% and the rental vacancy rate was 7.3%.

Racial composition as of the 2020 census
Race	Number	Percent
White	22,008	51.7%
Black or African American	13,226	31.1%
American Indian and Alaska Native	147	0.3%
Asian	1,898	4.5%
Native Hawaiian and Other Pacific Islander	24	0.1%
Some other race	2,080	4.9%
Two or more races	3,166	7.4%
Hispanic or Latino (of any race)	4,521	10.6%

== Arts and culture ==
The city is home to one of the few Georgia counties with a museum that focuses mainly on African-American history. The Coweta County African American Heritage Museum and Research Center, or Caswell House, was opened in July 2003 in a donated mill village house once owned by Ruby Caswell. The museum sits on Farmer Street on an old, unmarked slave cemetery. It has collected hundreds of family genealogical records by interviewing residents and going through the census records. The museum also houses the Coweta Census Indexes from 1870 to 1920.

The first black library in the county was the Sara Fisher Brown Library. Built in the 1950s, the library has since been converted into the Community Action For Improvement Center.

The Farmer Street Cemetery is the largest slave cemetery in the South. It is within the city limits of Newnan.

The song "Boots On the Ground" is strongly associated with the Boots On the Ground soul line dance created by Newnan native Jaterrious Trésean Little (a.k.a. Trè Little).

== Education ==
=== Coweta County School District ===
The Coweta County School District holds preschool to grade 12, and consists of 19 elementary schools, seven middle schools, and three high schools. The district has 1,164 full-time teachers and over 18,389 students.

==== Elementary schools ====
- Arbor Springs Elementary School
- Arnco-Sargent Elementary School
- Atkinson Elementary School
- Brooks Elementary School
- Canongate Elementary School
- Eastside Elementary School
- Elm Street Elementary School
- Glanton Elementary School
- Jefferson Parkway Elementary School
- Moreland Elementary School
- Newnan Crossing Elementary School
- Northside Elementary School
- Poplar Road Elementary School
- Ruth Hill Elementary School
- Thomas Crossroads Elementary School
- Western Elementary School
- Welch Elementary School
- White Oak Elementary School
- Willis Road Elementary School
- The Heritage School (private)
- Trinity Christian School (private)

==== Middle schools ====
- Arnall Middle School
- Blake Bass Middle School
- East Coweta Middle School
- Evans Middle School
- Lee Middle School
- Madras Middle School
- Smokey Road Middle School
- The Heritage School (private)
- Trinity Christian School (private)
- Odyssey Charter School

==== High schools ====
- Newnan High School
- East Coweta High School
- Northgate High School
- Central Educational Center (chartered Coweta County School System School)
- The Pentecostal Church of God Christian Academy (private)
- The Heritage School (private)
- Trinity Christian School (private)

=== Higher education ===
Mercer University has a regional academic center in Newnan. The center opened in 2010, and offers programs through the university's College of Continuing and Professional Studies.

The University of West Georgia has a campus located in Newnan, near downtown. This campus currently has two undergraduate programs - Bachelor of Science in nursing and early childhood education.

Newnan is also home to a campus of West Georgia Technical College.

College Temple was a non-sectarian women's school that operated from 1854 to 1888.

== Transportation ==
=== Major roads ===
- Interstate 85
- Outer Perimeter
- State Route 34
- State Route 34 Bypass
- State Route 16
- State Route 70
- Bullsboro Road
- Lower Fayetteville Road
- Newnan Crossing Boulevard East
- Newnan Crossing Bypass
- Millard Farmer Industrial Boulevard
- U.S. Route 29
- U.S. Route 27 Alternate

=== Public transit ===
The public trolley operates between downtown and The Forum at Ashley Park. In addition, the city is served by route 453 of the GRTA Xpress bus service, which operates between the Newnan Park and Ride and the Lakewood/Fort McPherson MARTA rail station.

Construction of The LINC, "a 25-mile, multi-use trail system" that would "connect the east and west sides" and "the downtown business district" was set to begin in 2018.

=== Airports ===
- Newnan–Coweta County Airport provides chartered air service and flight training.

=== Railroads ===
Until the mid-1950s the Central of Georgia operated two trains daily in each direction, through Newnan from Atlanta to Columbus, in its Man O' War service. The Central continued a single Man O' War train until 1971 when Amtrak took over most interstate passenger service. Until 1970, the city was a stop on the Southern Railway's Crescent from New Orleans to New York City, via Atlanta. Into the mid-1960s, the Southern's Crescent and Piedmont Limited made stops in both directions in Newnan.

== Notable people ==
- Ellis Arnall, governor of Georgia (1943–1947)
- William Yates Atkinson, governor of Georgia (1894–1898)
- Karsten Bailey, former National Football League (NFL) wide receiver with Seattle Seahawks and Green Bay Packers
- Enoch Marvin Banks, historian and educator
- Cam Bedrosian, Major League Baseball (MLB) pitcher for the Los Angeles Angels
- Steve Bedrosian, former MLB pitcher, winner of 1987 Cy Young Award
- Hamilton Bohannon, musician and record producer
- Keith Brooking, former linebacker with Georgia Tech and NFL's Atlanta Falcons and Dallas Cowboys
- Erskine Caldwell, novelist and short fiction writer (1903–1987)
- Jack Tarpley Camp Jr., jurist
- Lewis Grizzard, author and newspaper columnist
- Drew Hill, former NFL wide receiver with Houston Oilers, Los Angeles Rams, and Atlanta Falcons
- Alan Jackson, Country Music Hall of Fame member
- Joe M. Jackson, United States Air Force colonel, Medal of Honor recipient
- Calvin Johnson, former All-Pro NFL wide receiver with Detroit Lions, second selection of 2007 NFL draft
- John Keith, former NFL player
- Wil Lutz, NFL kicker with New Orleans Saints
- Mary Lyndon, first woman to receive degree from University of Georgia
- Monica, Grammy-winning singer, songwriter, actress, and entrepreneur
- Warren Newson, MLB player with Chicago White Sox, Texas Rangers
- Alec Ogletree, NFL linebacker
- Stephen W. Pless, Marine Corps major, Medal of Honor recipient
- Ralph Presley, airline pilot and politician
- Rocky Roquemore, international golf course designer
- Jefferson Randolph "Soapy" Smith II (1860–1898), infamous 19th century gambler, confidence man, and crime boss
- Lynn Smith, businesswoman, educator, and politician
- Will Smith, MLB pitcher for the Kansas City Royals and pitched the last inning of the World Series clinching game for the Atlanta Braves
- Doug Stone, country music singer-songwriter
- Charles Wadsworth, concert pianist, music promoter
- Jerome Walton, MLB player, 1989 Rookie of the Year
- Marie Robinson Wright (1853–1914), journalist, traveler, historian, author
- William C. Wright, congressman (1918–1933)
- Steve Young, pioneer country rock musician

== Television and movies ==
- The ABC television series October Road was filmed in Newnan, but is set in the fictional town of Knights Ridge, Massachusetts.
- The TV movie Murder in Coweta County (1983), based on the book by Margaret Anne Barnes, chronicles actual events that occurred around 1948.
- The NBC series I'll Fly Away was filmed in Newnan from 1991 to 1993.
- The 1995 movie Fluke was filmed in Newnan.
- Pet Sematary Two (1992)
- The 1979 movie The Sheriff and the Satellite Kid (Uno sceriffo extraterrestre... poco extra e molto terrestre) with Bud Spencer takes place and was filmed in Newnan.
- The Walking Dead TV series has several scenes filmed in Newnan, including Newnan High School and Sonrise Baptist Church.
- The Netflix TV series Insatiable was filmed in Newnan.
- Zombieland (2009)
- The Hunger Games: Mockingjay – Part 1 (2014)
- The Founder (2016)
- The House with a Clock in Its Walls (2018)
- Lovecraft Country (2019)
- Jumanji: The Next Level (2019) was filmed in Newnan where fake snow was sprayed all over downtown Newnan to have the effect of a winter storm. The filming of the movie occurred in the present business named Rock Salt Milk Bar which was named Nora's Diner in the movie.
