= John Keith (defensive back) =

American football player (born 1977)

No. 28
- Position: Safety

Personal information
- Born: February 4, 1977 (age 49); Newnan, Georgia, U.S.

Career information
- High school: East Coweta (Sharpsburg, Georgia)
- College: Furman (1995–1999)
- NFL draft: 2000: 4th round, 108th overall pick

Career history
- San Francisco 49ers (2000–2003)

Career NFL statistics
- Tackles: 57
- Sacks: 1
- Interceptions: 1
- Stats at Pro Football Reference

John Martin Keith (born February 4, 1977) is an American former professional football player who played safety for four seasons for the San Francisco 49ers in the National Football League (NFL). He was selected in the fourth round of the 2000 NFL draft with the 108th overall pick.
