= Chris Youngblood (basketball) =

American basketball player (born 2002)

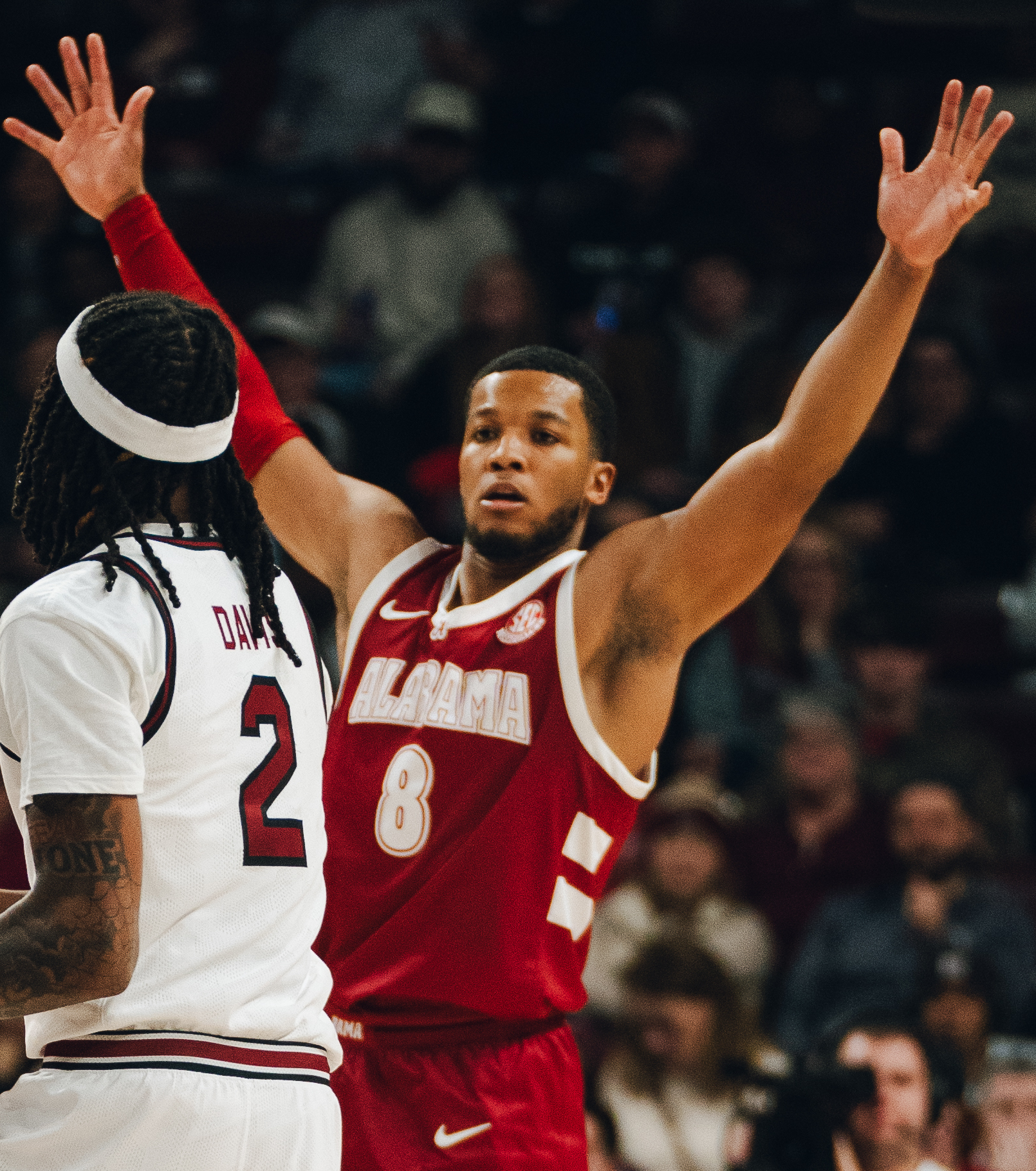
- Youngblood with Alabama in 2025

No. 11 – Portland Trail Blazers
- Position: Shooting guard
- League: NBA

Personal information
- Born: February 9, 2002 (age 24) Tuscaloosa, Alabama, U.S.
- Listed height: 6 ft 4 in (1.93 m)
- Listed weight: 221 lb (100 kg)

Career information
- High school: East Coweta (Sharpsburg, Georgia)
- College: Kennesaw State (2020–2023); South Florida (2023–2024); Alabama (2024–2025)
- NBA draft: 2025: undrafted
- Playing career: 2025–present

Career history
- 2025–2026: Oklahoma City Thunder
- 2025–2026: →Oklahoma City Blue
- 2026–present: Portland Trail Blazers
- 2026–present: →Rip City Remix

Career highlights
- AAC co-Player of the Year (2024); First-team All-AAC (2024); First-team All-Atlantic Sun (2023); Atlantic Sun All-Freshman team (2021)
- Stats at NBA.com
- Stats at Basketball Reference

Christopher Youngblood (born February 9, 2002) is an American professional basketball player for the Portland Trail Blazers of the National Basketball Association (NBA), on a two-way contract with the Rip City Remix of the NBA G League. He played college basketball for the Kennesaw State Owls, South Florida Bulls, and Alabama Crimson Tide.

== College career ==
Coming to Kennesaw State from East Coweta High School, Youngblood was a three-year starter for the Owls. He averaged double-figures and improved his scoring average in each season. As a junior in the 2022–23 season, he led the Owls to their first NCAA tournament berth, earning first-team All-Atlantic Sun Conference honors.

After three seasons at Kennesaw State, Youngblood followed coach Amir Abdur-Rahim, transferring to South Florida with Owl teammates Brandon Stroud and Kasen Jennings. The trio led the Bulls to a surprising American Athletic Conference regular season title. Youngblood averaged 15.3 points per game and was named the AAC co-Player of the Year.

Following the 2023–24 season, Youngblood entered the transfer portal again. He ultimately chose to play for coach Nate Oats at Alabama in his hometown of Tuscaloosa, Alabama.

== Professional career ==
After going undrafted in the 2025 NBA draft, Youngblood signed an NBA Summer League deal with the Oklahoma City Thunder. After an impressive preseason with the team, he signed a two-way contract with the Thunder on October 18, 2025. Youngblood made 32 appearances for Oklahoma City, recording averages of 2.0 points, 0.9 rebounds, and 0.3 assists. He was waived by the Thunder on February 6, 2026.

On March 2, 2026, Youngblood signed a two-way contract with the Portland Trail Blazers.

== Career statistics ==
Legend
GP	Games played	GS	Games started	MPG	Minutes per game
FG%	Field goal percentage	3P%	3-point field goal percentage	FT%	Free throw percentage
RPG	Rebounds per game	APG	Assists per game	SPG	Steals per game
BPG	Blocks per game	PPG	Points per game	**Bold**	Career high

=== NBA ===
Year	Team	GP	GS	MPG	FG%	3P%	FT%	RPG	APG	SPG	BPG	PPG
2025–26	Oklahoma City	**32**	0	5.4	.333	.314	**.900**	**.9**	.3	**.1**	**.1**	2.0
2025–26	Portland	2	0	**5.5**	**.667**	**.667**	—	.0	**.5**	.0	.0	**3.0**
Career		34	0	5.4	.349	.333	.900	.8	.4	.1	.1	2.1

=== College ===
Year	Team	GP	GS	MPG	FG%	3P%	FT%	RPG	APG	SPG	BPG	PPG
2020–21	Kennesaw State	24	21	**32.3**	.396	.331	**.841**	3.3	1.8	.8	.5	12.4
2021–22	Kennesaw State	30	30	30.8	**.476**	.405	.789	**5.2**	1.0	.9	.5	13.9
2022–23	Kennesaw State	**35**	**35**	31.4	.464	.415	.821	4.7	1.8	**1.1**	.4	14.7
2023–24	South Florida	33	32	29.9	.458	**.416**	.829	2.5	**2.1**	.6	**.6**	**15.3**
2024–25	Alabama	28	18	25.3	.447	.388	.804	2.3	.9	.7	.3	10.3
Career		150	136	30.0	.451	.393	.819	3.6	1.5	.8	.4	13.5
