= Northgate High School (Newnan, Georgia) =

Public high school in Newnan, Georgia, United States

Location
- 3220 Fischer Road; Newnan, Georgia 30265; United States; 33.46877°N 84.66638°W

Information
- Type: Public
- Established: 1996
- School district: Coweta County School System
- Principal: Ashley Wilkes
- Teaching staff: 117.00 (FTE)
- Grades: 9-12
- Enrollment: 2,054 (2023-2024)
- Student to teacher ratio: 17.56
- Colors: Crimson, white and gray
- Mascot: Viking
- Website: nghs.cowetaschools.net

Northgate High School (NGHS) is a public high school located in northeastern Coweta County near Newnan, Georgia, United States. Founded in 1996, Northgate is the newest of the three Coweta County School System high schools.

Northgate offers four diploma choices: College Prep with Distinction, College Prep, Career/Technical with Distinction, and Career/Technical. Students may also choose a dual diploma program with both college prep and career/tech seals.

Feeder schools include Blake Bass Middle School, Madras Middle School and Arnall Middle School. Madras also feeds into the nearby Newnan High School.

== Athletics ==
Northgate has achieved a few state champions in classes AAAA and AAAAA. In 2009, the school's baseball team compiled a 32–5 record and an all-region championship game with Starr's Mill, and defeated them in three games.

Their competition cheerleading won state in 2007, 2008, 2009, 2010, 2011, 2015, 2016 and 2017. Competition cheerleading finished runner-up in 2006 and 2012. They finished third in 2005.

The girls' soccer team won the AAAAA title in 2013 by defeating conference rival Whitewater. In 2014, they appeared again in the Final Four. In 2015, they were region champions and advanced to the state championship game where they were 5A state runner-up, losing to Starr's Mill.

The boys' soccer team finished 5A state runner-up in 2016, producing a county-best 19-2-1 record and scoring 98 goals along the way.

Northgate's softball team won their first championship in 2007 and won again in 2011.

The first state championship in school history was earned by the wrestling squad in 2002. Tyler Askey won his fourth state wrestling championship in 2013, with a perfect record of 194–0.

== Band program ==
In 20 years as a competitive unit, the band has earned 112 Class Championship awards, 39 Divisional Championship awards and 9 Grand Championship awards. The band has also performed in several notable events, including the Children's Healthcare of Atlanta Christmas Parade, the New York City St. Patrick's Day parade, the Hollywood Christmas Parade, the Hollywood Bowl, and the National Cherry Blossom Parade.

== Notable alumni ==
- Brandon Facyson, professional National Football League cornerback for the Las Vegas Raiders
- Wil Lutz, professional National Football League kicker for the Denver Broncos
- Will Smith, professional Major League Baseball pitcher for the Kansas City Royals
- James Skalski, collegiate linebacker for the Clemson Tigers
