= Reinhardt Eagles football =

College football team

- First season: 2013; 13 years ago
- Athletic director: Jeffrey Pourchier
- Head coach: James Miller; 9th season, 78–23 (.772)
- Location: Waleska, Georgia
- Stadium: University Stadium (capacity: 1,000)
- Field: Ken White Field
- Conference: AAC
- Colors: Navy and gold
- All-time record: 112–34 (.767)
- Playoff record: 6–10 (.375)

Conference championships
- 4 AAC (2022–2025)

Conference division championships
- 5 MSC Appalachian Division (2017–2021); 2 MSC West Division (2013, 2016)
- Mascot: Eagles
- Website: reinhardteagles.com

The Reinhardt Eagles football team represents Reinhardt University in college football in the National Association of Intercollegiate Athletics (NAIA). The Eagles are members of the Appalachian Athletic Conference (AAC), fielding its team in the AAC since 2022. The Eagles play their home games at University Stadium in Waleska, Georgia.

Their head coach is James Miller, who took over the position for the 2017 season.

== Conference affiliations ==
- Mid-South Conference (2013–2021)
- Appalachian Athletic Conference (2022–present)

== List of head coaches ==
=== Key ===
Key to symbols in coaches list
General		Overall		Conference		Postseason (Note: Although the first Rose Bowl Game was played in 1902, it has been continuously played since the 1916 game, and is recognized as the oldest bowl game by the NCAA. "—" indicates any season prior to 1916 when postseason games were not played.)	
No.	Order of coaches (Note: A running total of the number of head coaches, with coaches who served separate tenures being counted only once. Interim head coaches are represented with "Int" and are not counted in the running total. "—" indicates the team played but either without a coach or no coach is on record. "X" indicates an interim year without play.)	GC	Games coached	CW	Conference wins	PW	Postseason wins
DC	Division championships	OW	Overall wins	CL	Conference losses	PL	Postseason losses
CC	Conference championships	OL	Overall losses	CT	Conference ties	PT	Postseason ties
NC	National championships	OT	Overall ties (Note: Overtime rules in college football were introduced in 1996, making ties impossible in the period since.)	C%	Conference winning percentage		
†	Elected to the College Football Hall of Fame	O%	Overall winning percentage (Note: When computing the win–loss percentage, a tie counts as half a win and half a loss.)				

=== Coaches ===
List of head football coaches showing season(s) coached, overall records and conference records
No.	Name	Season(s)	GC	OW	OL	OT	O%	CW	CL	CT	C%
1	Danny Cronic	2013–2014	20	12	8	0	0.600	7	3	0	0.700
2	Drew Cronic	2015–2016	25	22	3	0	0.893	9	1	0	0.900
3	James Miller	2017–present	101	78	23	0	0.772	52	1	0	0.981

== Year-by-year results ==
National champions	Conference champions	Division champions	Playoff berth

Season	Year	Head coach	Association	Conference	Division	Record					Postseason	Final ranking
Season	Year	Head coach	Association	Conference	Division	Overall		Conference			Postseason	Final ranking
Season	Year	Head coach	Association	Conference	Division	Win	Loss	Finish	Win	Loss	Postseason	Final ranking
Reinhardt Eagles
2013	2013	Danny Cronic	NAIA	MSC	West Division	6	4	T–1st (West)	4	1	—	—
2014	2014	Danny Cronic	NAIA	MSC	West Division	6	4	3rd (West)	3	2	—	—
2015	2015	Drew Cronic	NAIA	MSC	West Division	9	2	2nd (West)	4	1	L NAIA First Round	10
2016	2016	Drew Cronic	NAIA	MSC	West Division	13	1	1st (West)	5	0	L NAIA Semifinal	3
2017	2017	James Miller	NAIA	MSC	Appalachian Division	12	1	1st (Appalachian)	6	0	L NAIA Championship	2
2018	2018	James Miller	NAIA	MSC	Appalachian Division	9	2	1st (Appalachian)	6	0	L NAIA First Round	11
2019	2019	James Miller	NAIA	MSC	Appalachian Division	9	3	1st (Appalachian)	6	0	L NAIA First Round	13
2020–21	2020	James Miller	NAIA	MSC	Appalachian Division	9	1	1st (Appalachian)	6	0	L NAIA Second Round	8
2021	2021	James Miller	NAIA	MSC	Appalachian Division	9	3	1st (Appalachian)	6	0	L NAIA First Round	6
2022	2022	James Miller	NAIA	AAC	—	8	2	1st	5	0	L NAIA First Round	9
2023	2023	James Miller	NAIA	AAC	—	8	3	1st	6	0	L NAIA First Round	18
2024	2024	James Miller	NAIA	AAC	—	7	4	T–1st	5	1	—	—
2025	2025	James Miller	NAIA	AAC	—	7	4	1st	6	0	L NAIA First Round	23
