= Newnan High School =

Public high school in Coweta County, Georgia, United States

Location
- 190 Lagrange Street; Newnan, Georgia 30263-2999; United States; 33°21′46″N 84°48′53″W

Information
- Type: Public high school
- Founded: 1918
- School district: Coweta County School System
- Principal: Gamal Kemp
- Teaching staff: 137.00 FTE
- Grades: 9–12
- Enrollment: 2,246 (2023–2024)
- Student to teacher ratio: 16.39
- Colors: Gold and navy
- Mascot: Cougar
- Accreditations: Southern Association of Colleges and Schools; Georgia Accrediting Commission
- Website: nhs.cowetaschools.net

Newnan High School (NHS) is a public high school in southwestern Coweta County, Georgia, United States. It is located south of Newnan's historic downtown district. Feeder schools include Evans Middle School, Smokey Road Middle School, and Madras Middle School. Madras also feeds into the nearby Northgate High School.

== History ==
Founded in 1918 as the first high school in Newnan, NHS was a Southern Accredited School by 1919.

In 1952, a new school building was built, eventually expanding to fill an entire city block.

On March 26, 2021, an EF4 tornado seriously damaged many buildings on the school campus. In 2022, it was proposed to demolish 13 buildings on the school campus, and replace them with 5 new buildings.

On July 28, 2024 an opening ceremony to the public commenced with a tour of the new school. On August 2, 2024 Newnan High School opened to a fully completed campus to its students and staff with a state of the art building which features a large auditorium, library with noise cancelling rooms, and much more and a tornado shelter along with the first floor which is partially underground and updated technology against school security and safety.

== Athletics ==
NHS' athletic programs include football, soccer, baseball, gymnastics, cheerleading, track, volleyball, wrestling, tennis, swimming, softball, lacrosse, basketball, golf, cross country and marching band.

NHS' football team has competed in many region championships in the AAAAA class. The most recent was their varsity football team reaching the State Semi-Finals, losing to Northside High School from Warner Robins, Georgia.

The Cougars have won many basketball championships and are a constant Elite 8 competitor in baseball.

== Notable alumni ==
- Alan Bonner (class of 2009), football player (Jacksonville State, Houston Texans)
- Mike Cheever (class of 1991), football player (Georgia Tech, Jacksonville Jaguars)
- Brogan Finlay (class of 2020), professional wrestler
- David Finlay (class of 2011), professional wrestler
- Drew Hill (class of 1975), football player (Georgia Tech, Los Angeles Rams, Houston Oilers, Atlanta Falcons)
- Alan Jackson (class of 1977), country music artist
- Warren Newson, former professional baseball player (Chicago White Sox, Seattle Mariners, Texas Rangers)
- Alec Ogletree (class of 2010), football player (University of Georgia, St. Louis/Los Angeles Rams, New York Giants, New York Jets)
- Sergio Render (class of 2005), football player (Virginia Tech, Tampa Bay Buccaneers)
- Jerome Walton, former professional baseball player (Chicago Cubs, California Angels, Cincinnati Reds, Atlanta Braves, Baltimore Orioles, Tampa Bay Devil Rays)

== In popular culture ==
Some scenes in The Walking Dead episode "Save The Last One" (season 2, episode 3), were filmed in and near the NHS campus.

The High School scene of the Christmas themed Slasher film Santa's Slay was filmed on campus.
