= James Miller (American football) =

American football coach (born 1981)

Current position
- Title: Head coach
- Team: Reinhardt
- Conference: AAC
- Record: 78–23

Biographical details
- Born: August 13, 1981 (age 45); Sylva, North Carolina, U.S.
- Education: Virginia Tech (2004)

Playing career
- 2000–2004: Virginia Tech
- Position: Guard

Coaching career (HC unless noted)
- 2005: Fort Lauderdale HS (FL) (RGC)
- 2006–2007: Virginia Tech (GA)
- 2008–2012: UNC Pembroke (DL)
- 2013: Clark Atlanta (OL)
- 2014–2016: Reinhardt (OL)
- 2017–present: Reinhardt

Administrative career (AD unless noted)
- 2005: UNC Pembroke (assistant AD)

Head coaching record
- Overall: 78–23
- Tournaments: 4–8 (NAIA playoffs)

Accomplishments and honors

Championships
- 5 MSC Appalachian Division (2017–2021); 4 AAC (2022–2025)

James E. Miller (born August 13, 1981) is an American college football coach. He is the head football coach for Reinhardt University, a position he has held since 2017. He also coached for Fort Lauderdale High School, Virginia Tech, UNC Pembroke, and Clark Atlanta. He played college football as a guard for Virginia Tech.

== Head coaching record ==
| Year | Team | Overall | Conference | Standing | Bowl/playoffs | NAIA Coaches'^{#} |
|---|---|---|---|---|---|---|
Reinhardt Eagles (Mid-South Conference) (2017–2021)
| 2017 | Reinhardt | 12–1 | 6–0 | 1st (Appalachian) | L NAIA Championship | 2 |
| 2018 | Reinhardt | 9–2 | 6–0 | 1st (Appalachian) | L NAIA First Round | 11 |
| 2019 | Reinhardt | 9–3 | 6–0 | 1st (Appalachian) | L NAIA First Round | 13 |
| 2020 | Reinhardt | 9–1 | 6–0 | 1st (Appalachian) | L NAIA Second Round | 8 |
| 2021 | Reinhardt | 9–3 | 6–0 | 1st (Appalachian) | L NAIA First Round | 6 |
Reinhardt Eagles (Appalachian Athletic Conference) (2022–present)
| 2022 | Reinhardt | 8–2 | 5–0 | 1st | L NAIA First Round | 9 |
| 2023 | Reinhardt | 8–3 | 6–0 | 1st | L NAIA First Round | 18 |
| 2024 | Reinhardt | 7–4 | 5–1 | T–1st | | |
| 2025 | Reinhardt | 7–4 | 6–0 | 1st | L NAIA First Round | 23 |
| 2026 | Reinhardt | 0–0 | 0–0 | | | |
| Reinhardt: | | 78–23 | 52–1 | | | |
| Total: | | 78–23 | | | | |
National championship Conference title Conference division title or championship game berth
