= College Temple =

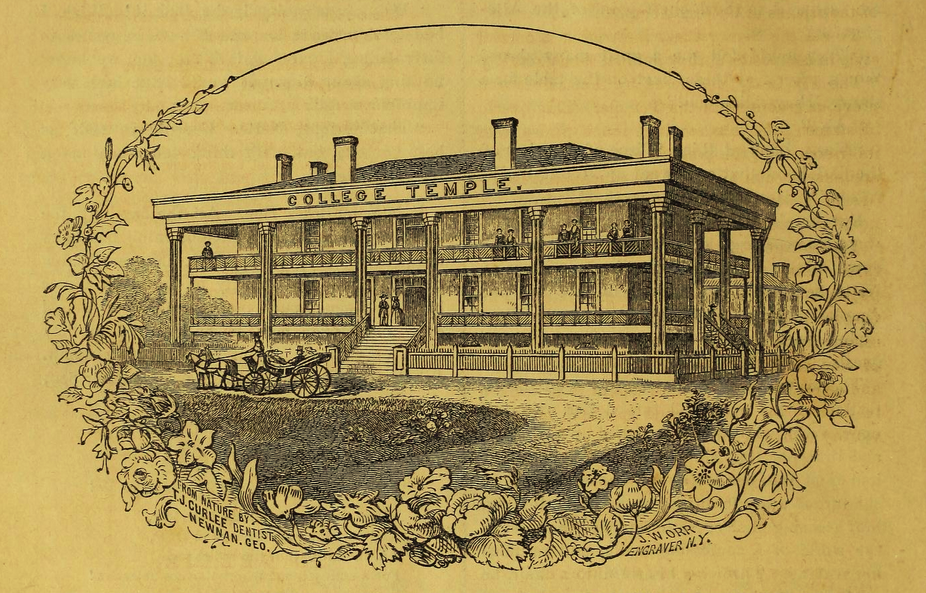
- Newnan, Georgia; United States

Information
- Type: non-sectarian
- Motto: Femina, Divinum Donum
- Established: 1854
- Founder: M. P. Kellogg
- Closed: 1888
- Gender: women-only
- Newspaper: The Fly-Leaf

College Temple was a 19th-century non-sectarian American female college located at Newnan, Georgia, 40 miles (64 km) from Atlanta. Founded in 1854, it closed in 1888, and its founder, Professor M. P. Kellogg, died the following year.

== History ==
Chartered in 1854, its goals were to educate young women to prepare them for the able discharge of their numerous and arduous duties in the domestic circle and society, and to qualify them for writing in defence of right, morals, and the Christian religion. The school was founded, constructed, and supported by M. P. Kellogg, M. A., President and sole proprietor, who built and furnished it at his own expense. His career as an educator lasted 44 years before his death Kellogg on November 1, 1889, age 66 years.

Kellogg never denied admission to an orphan or impecunious pupil. After three years of operation, there were one hundred pupils in attendance, and six graduates. The founder was determined to make this a model school for educating young women. The motto of her seal was Femina, Divinum Donum, and as such, young women were trained in physical, mental, and spiritual harmony.

During the civil war, the institution was repurposed as a hospital. In 1888, Kellogg discontinued the school.

In May 1890, a movement was started by the citizens of Newnan to purchase the College Temple property and establish a first-class female college. Six thousand dollars were subscribed in a few hours time. In the following month, an offer was considered, made by the Board of Trade, of Newnan, to give to the diocese the school buildings and grounds on condition that the diocese would establish and maintain there a female college. After some discussion, this was refused because, in the opinion of the committee, a denominational school of this character could not be successfully maintained under existing state school laws, and because the diocese at the time was unable to endow such an institution.

== Buildings and grounds ==
Erected in 1852 were three large buildings. The improvements cost originally about US$20,000.

The boarding house was three stories high, 100 feet (30 m) long. The laboratory building was two stories high, 40 by 40 feet (12 m × 12 m), and contained rooms for Music, a Preparatory Department, and Philosophical and Chemical Laboratory, well supplied with the best of instruments. There were numerous annexes to the main buildings. The college building proper was one of the most commodious and imposing of its kind in the state. The chapel seated 600-700 persons. A large audience hall was situated in a grove of 3 acres (1.2 ha), surrounded by four streets.

The grounds totalled 8 acres (3.2 ha).

== Student life ==
To secure the most rigid mental discipline in each pupil, no specified time was assigned for a young woman to complete her education at College Temple, but she was allowed to advance as rapidly as her mental and physical abilities would permit. Graduates were conferred an M.A. degree, Magistra in Artibus, accompanied with a diploma in Latin, when she thoroughly mastered the extensive course of study adopted by the institution.

To aid the Senior Class in forming a correct style in composition, they published semi-annually The Fly-Leaf, composed by themselves and previous graduates of College Temple. This quarto at sixteen pages received praise from its friends, and the press in many places.

Its alumnae were scattered from Maine to Texas. No less than 300 alumni from the state of Georgia alone were students at one time.

== Notable alumni ==
- Marie Robinson Wright (1853-1914), writer
