= Drew Cronic =

American football coach (born 1974)

Current position
- Title: Offensive coordinator
- Team: Navy
- Conference: AAC

Biographical details
- Born: January 24, 1974 (age 52); Canton, Georgia, U.S.

Playing career
- 1995–1997: Georgia
- Position: Wide receiver

Coaching career (HC unless noted)
- 1998: West Georgia (GA)
- 1999–2001: James Madison (WR / asst. RC)
- 2002–2007: Furman (WR/RC)
- 2008–2010: Furman (TE/RC)
- 2012–2014: Reinhardt (AHC/OC/QB/RC)
- 2015–2016: Reinhardt
- 2017: Furman (OC)
- 2018–2019: Lenoir–Rhyne
- 2020–2023: Mercer
- 2024–present: Navy (OC)

Head coaching record
- Overall: 75–23
- Tournaments: 2–2 (NAIA playoffs); 4–2 (NCAA D-II playoffs); 1–1 (NCAA D-I playoffs)

Accomplishments and honors

Championships
- 2 SAC (2018–2019); 1 MSC West Division (2016)

Awards
- AFCA NCAA Division II COY (2018)

Andrew Danny Cronic (born January 24, 1974) is an American college football coach. He is the offensive coordinator for the United States Naval Academy, a position he has held since 2024. He was the head football coach for Reinhardt University from 2015 to 2016, Lenoir–Rhyne University from 2018 to 2019, and Mercer University from 2020 to 2023. He also coached for West Georgia, James Madison, and Furman. He played college football for Georgia as a wide receiver.

== Head coaching record ==
Year	Team	Overall	Conference	Standing	Bowl/playoffs	NAIA/STATS^{#}	AFCA/Coaches^{°}
Reinhardt Eagles (Mid-South Conference) (2015–2016)
2015	Reinhardt	9–2	4–1	2nd (West)	L NAIA First Round	10	
2016	Reinhardt	13–1	5–0	1st (West)	L NAIA Semifinal	3	
Reinhardt:		22–3	9–1				
Lenoir–Rhyne Bears (South Atlantic Conference) (2018–2019)
2018	Lenoir–Rhyne	12–2	7–0	1st	L NCAA Division II Quarterfinal		8
2019	Lenoir–Rhyne	13–1	8–0	1st	L NCAA Division II Semifinal		4
Lenoir–Rhyne:		25–3	15–0				
Mercer Bears (Southern Conference) (2020–2023)
2020–21	Mercer	5–6	5–3	4th			
2021	Mercer	7–3	6–2	2nd			
2022	Mercer	7–4	5–3	T–3rd		24	21
2023	Mercer	9–4	6–2	T–2nd	L NCAA Division I Second Round	17	20
Mercer:		28–17	22–10				
Total:		75–23					
National championship Conference title Conference division title or championship game berth
