= Keith Brooking =

American football player (born 1975)

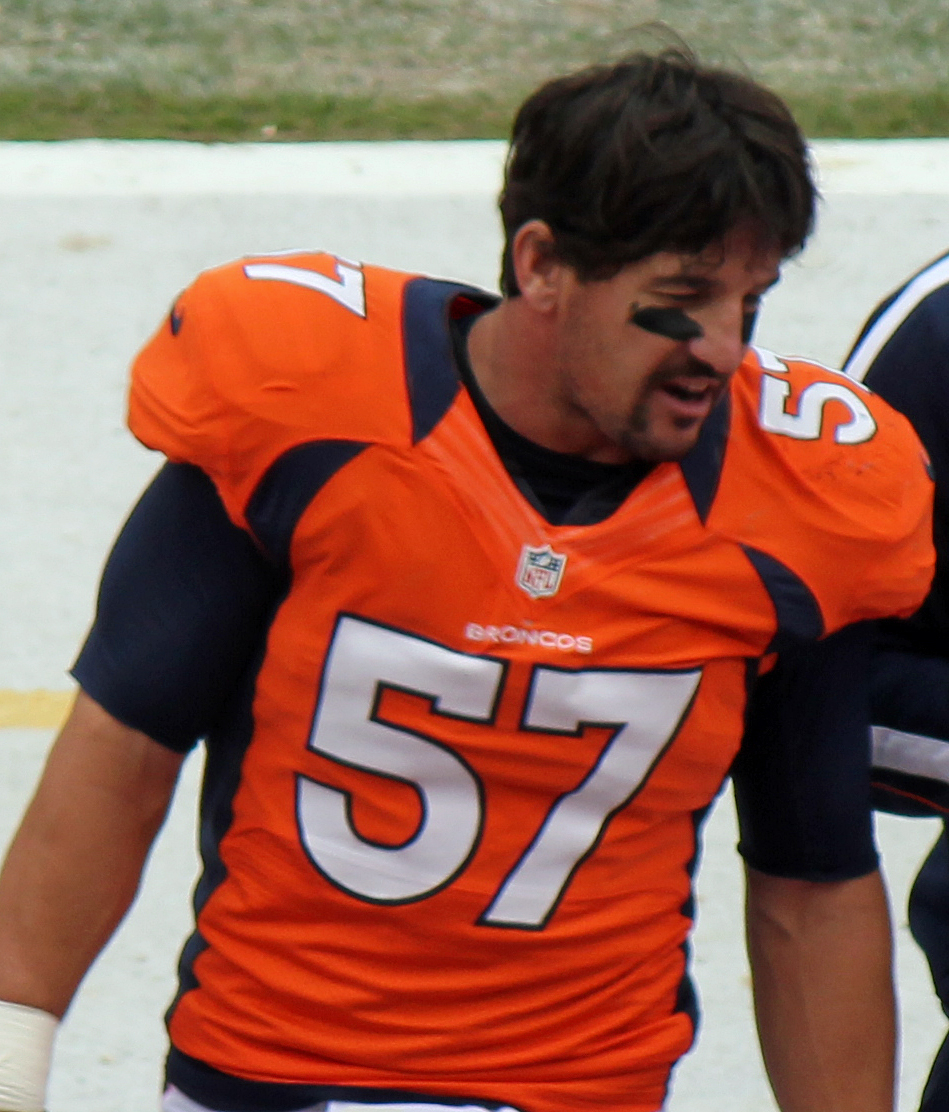
- Brooking with the Denver Broncos in 2012

No. 56, 51, 57
- Position: Linebacker

Personal information
- Born: October 30, 1975 (age 51); Senoia, Georgia, U.S.
- Listed height: 6 ft 2 in (1.88 m)
- Listed weight: 240 lb (109 kg)

Career information
- High school: East Coweta (Sharpsburg, Georgia)
- College: Georgia Tech (1994–1997)
- NFL draft: 1998: 1st round, 12th overall pick

Career history
- Atlanta Falcons (1998–2008); Dallas Cowboys (2009–2011); Denver Broncos (2012)

Awards and highlights
- 2× Second-team All-Pro (2002, 2004); 5× Pro Bowl (2001–2005); NFL solo tackles leader (2003); Second-team All-ACC (1997)

Career NFL statistics
- Tackles: 1,440
- Sacks: 22
- Forced fumbles: 9
- Fumble recoveries: 10
- Interceptions: 13
- Stats at Pro Football Reference

Keith Howard Brooking (born October 30, 1975) is an American former professional football player who was a linebacker in the National Football League (NFL). He played college football for the Georgia Tech Yellow Jackets and was selected by the Atlanta Falcons in the first round of the 1998 NFL draft. Brooking was a five-time Pro Bowl selection with the Falcons. He also played for the Dallas Cowboys and Denver Broncos.

== Early life ==
Brooking graduated from East Coweta High School in Sharpsburg, Georgia in 1994. He played both offense and defense as #35, was a member of the Key Club and was also voted Mr. ECHS. He was recruited to play college football by the Georgia Tech Yellow Jackets.

== College career ==
He started 34 straight games to end his college career as he led the team in tackles during his final three seasons at Georgia Tech and became the leading tackler in Georgia Tech history (467). He had two of the best tackle seasons in school history with 147 and 146, respectively, as a junior and sophomore.

Brooking had 131 tackles, two sacks, two interceptions, three passes defensed, one fumble recovery and one blocked field goal to lead Tech to a Bowl game as a senior. Voted a permanent team captain by his teammates and a finalist for the Dick Butkus Award. He was the top tackler in the ACC in 1995 after averaging 13.3 stops a game and ranked second in the conference in 1996 with 13.4 tackles a game. Brooking finished his collegiate career with 15 tackles and one interception to help the Yellow Jackets defeat West Virginia in the 1997 Carquest Bowl. He is remembered one of the greatest players to ever play at Georgia Tech.

== Professional career ==
Pre-draft measurables
Height	Weight	Arm length	Hand span	Bench press
6 ft 2 3/8 in (1.89 m)	244 lb (111 kg)	32 3/8 in (0.82 m)	10 1/8 in (0.26 m)	24 reps

=== Atlanta Falcons ===
After being the 12th overall selection in the first round by the Falcons in the 1998 NFL draft, Brooking quickly became the foundation of their defense. In his rookie season, he played in 15 games and posted 32 tackles, 1 interception, 2 forced fumbles, and 5 passes defensed as he served as the team nickel linebacker in passing situations throughout the season. He recorded 8 tackles in the NFC Championship game vs Minnesota Vikings, when the Falcons reached the Super Bowl XXXIII, but Atlanta fell to the Broncos 34–19. After that season, in 1999, he started 13 games, finished with 95 tackles (4th in the team), and he added 2 sacks and 2 passes defended. His first career start was against the Vikings, recording 8 tackles, and his first career sack was against Baltimore, sacking Stoney Case.

During the 2000 season, Brooking was placed in the Injury Reserve after suffering a sprained foot in a game vs Philadelphia. He finished with 39 tackles, 1 sack and 1 forced fumble. In 2001, he started all the games and did not miss a play on defense in 957 total snaps as he made the transition to middle linebacker, registered 15 tackles and a sack in his first game as a Middle linebacker. He led the Falcons with 167 tackles and registered 2 interceptions, 2 forced fumbles, 2 fumble recoveries, 9 passes defended and 3.5 sacks. He was named Defensive Player of the Week for the first time in his career at New Orleans (October 21) after recording 12 tackles, one sack and two passes defensed, also he had a key interception vs. Dallas Cowboys to seal a 20–13 win with 0:16 remaining on Atlanta 30-yard line. This season he was named to the Pro Bowl, becoming the first Falcon Pro Bowler since 1998, when six falcons made the trip to Hawaii. In 2002, Brooking became the fifth Falcons player to total 200 tackles in a season, following Tommy Nobis (296 in 1966), Fulton Kuykendall (284 in 1978), Buddy Curry (229 in 1983) and Jessie Tuggle (201 in 1990, 207 in 1991).

He also established a new career-high with 22 tackles vs Green Bay Packers. The 22 tackles were the most by a Falcons player since Jessie Tuggle had 22 vs. New Orleans on September 29, 1991, was named NFC Defensive Player of the Week for his efforts vs. New Orleans Saints (September 17) when he collected 15 stops and one fumble recovery. He blocked his first career blocked field goal against the Vikings to Veteran kicker Gary Anderson. He earned second straight Pro Bowl after leading the team with a career-high 212 tackles, also added 2 interceptions, 2 fumble recoveries and 1 forced fumble. In 2003, was named to his third consecutive Pro Bowl after registering a team-high 207 total tackles and career-high 130 solo stops in 16 starts and posting two fumble recoveries. During the season, Brooking posted a season high 18 tackles at New Orleans, the second highest total since he recorded 22 stops at Green Bay ( August 9, 2002 ). He registered 17 tackles apiece vs. New York Giants, at Tampa Bay and vs. Jacksonville . In 2004, recorded a team-high 10 tackles along with one forced fumble at Carolina in a defensive effort that limited the Panthers to 10 points, registered 10 tackles and one interception vs. San Diego Chargers, helped limit LaDainian Tomlinson to 64 yards on 23 carries worth a 2.8 avg, recorded 9 tackles and his first sack since the 2001 season vs. Tampa Bay, he registered two forced fumbles, one sack and a season-high with 12 tackles against Carolina. This season, Falcons reached the NFC championship game but were defeated by Philadelphia Eagles 10–27. Although, Brooking was named with Pro Bowl honors for the fourth straight year after totaling a team-high 144 tackles. He finished with 2.5 sacks, two forced fumbles, one fumble recovery and three interceptions as he led the team in tackles 10 times.

In 2005 finished the season with a team-high 150 tackles in addition to establishing career-highs in interceptions (4) and passes defensed (10), also recorded one fumble recovery and tied a career-high with 3.5 sacks. He started his first game of the season at middle linebacker in place of an injured Ed Hartwell (Achilles) at New Orleans and led the linebacker corps with eight tackles in addition to posting his second interception of the season, he recorded 12 tackles and his first sack of the season vs Seattle . Brooking established a career-high with his fourth interception of the season at Tampa Bay in addition to tallying a team-high 12 tackles. He posted 8 tackles, 1 sack and 1 interception vs. Minnesota in his 100th career game, he became the first Falcons player to record a sack and interception in the same game since 2000 vs St. Louis Rams, also tallied one sack, one pass defensed and a team-high 10 tackles vs. Carolina in the season finale. He tied a team record when he was named to his fifth consecutive Pro Bowl appearance.

In 2006, Brooking led the team with 165 tackles for the sixth year in a row, he added 2.5 sacks, one fumble recovery and one pass defensed. He led the team in tackles with 12 vs. Tampa Bay in addition to assisting a defense that did not allow a touchdown for the second consecutive game, collected a team-high 13 tackles at Detroit Lions in addition to his first sack of the season, tallied his fourth straight double-digit tackle game with 15 at Baltimore Ravens . Again vs Tampa Bay, he led the team in tackles with a season-high 18, also posted 9 tackles and one sack (9 yards) vs. New Orleans Saints . In 2007, finished with 127 tackles ( 82 solo ), 2 sacks for a loss of 13 yards, one fumble recovery and 4 passes defensed in 16 starts. He posted a team-high 11 tackles and one pass defensed at Jacksonville, also he led the team with 10 tackles, including 9 solo tackles at New Orleans and logged six tackles and one sack (8 yards) vs. San Francisco 49ers . Notched a team-high 10 tackles in the Thursday night game vs. Indianapolis Colts, in addition to recording one sack (5 yards). He had a season-high 15 tackles vs the Buccaneers for a defense that allowed a season-low 109 passing yards. Brooking became a free agent on February 27, 2009.

=== Dallas Cowboys ===
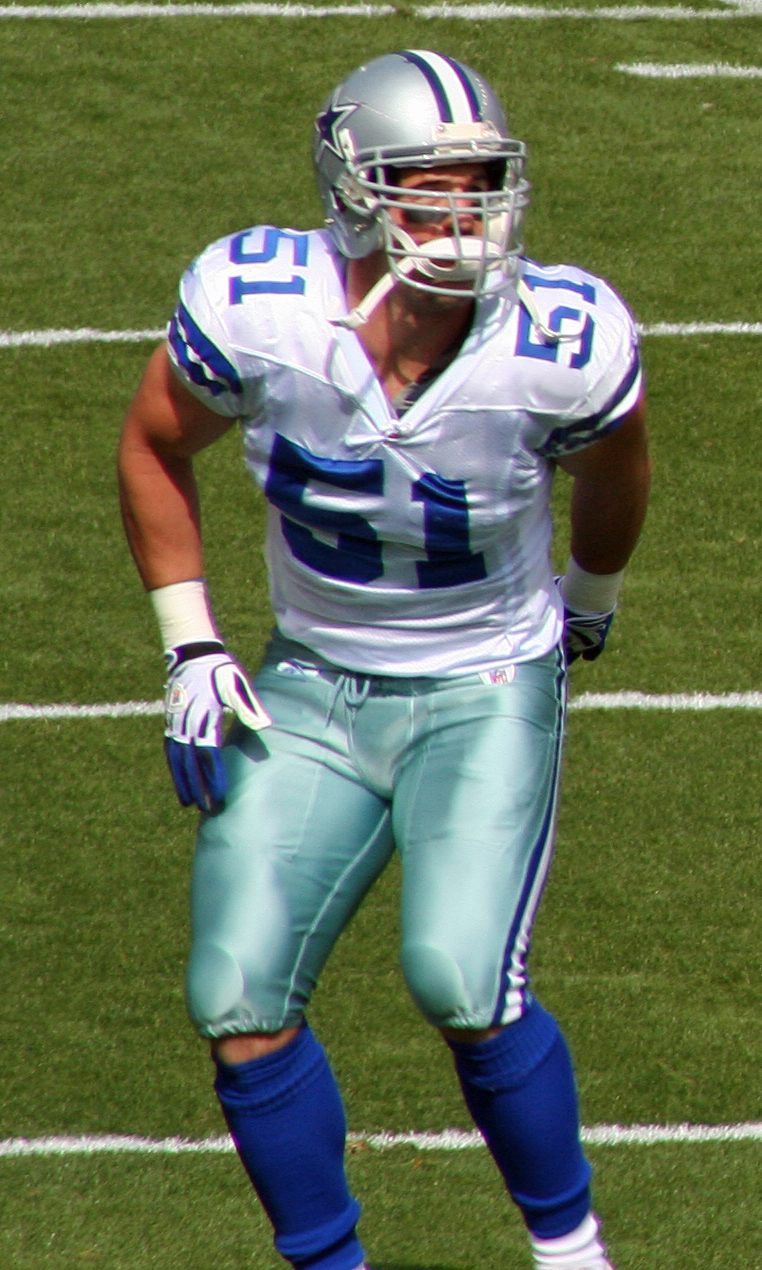
Brooking during a game in Denver on October 4, 2009.

Brooking signed a three-year, $6 million contract ($2.5 million guaranteed) with the Dallas Cowboys on February 28, 2009, after he and the Falcons did not reach an agreement. In 2009, he started at inside linebacker beside Bradie James, posting 156 tackles (second on the team) and 3 sacks (fourth on the team). In 2010, he registered 151 tackles (second on the team), 2 tackles for loss, one sack, 6 quarterback pressures, one interception and 9 passes defensed. In 2011, with the emergence of Sean Lee, he split snaps with James at the other inside linebacker spot and finished with 50 tackles. At the end of the season, the club decided not to re-sign him.

Brooking's pregame on-field speeches are credited for motivating the team to reach the playoffs and contend for an NFC East championship in his first season with the team. An article was written in The Dallas Morning News about Brooking's motivational speeches. The article featured this speech from an earlier game:

Before the Washington game, as players gather around, Brooking screams, "We're gonna keep hitting 'em, we're gonna keep hitting 'em!" Players shout, "Yeah!" after both lines.

Brooking, wide-eyed and picking up speed, says, "They might get back up. Then we're gonna hit 'em again! And when they're barely hanging on ..."

At this point Choice cuts in, "What're we gonna do?"

Brooking concludes: "We're gonna hit 'em in the mouth! We're gonna bloody their nose! We're gonna knock 'em to the ground!"

=== Denver Broncos ===
On August 6, 2012, Brooking signed a one-year contract with the Denver Broncos. At 37 years of age, he was not re-signed at the end of the season.

=== NFL statistics ===
Year	Team	GP	COMB	TOTAL	AST	SACK	FF	FR	FR YDS	INT	IR YDS	AVG IR	LNG	TD	PD
1998	ATL	15	26	19	7	0.0	2	0	0	1	12	12	12	0	5
1999	ATL	13	94	73	21	2.0	0	0	0	0	0	0	0	0	2
2000	ATL	5	35	27	8	1.0	1	0	0	0	0	0	0	0	2
2001	ATL	16	125	100	25	3.5	2	2	0	2	17	9	9	0	8
2002	ATL	16	139	110	29	0.0	1	2	0	2	24	12	22	0	2
2003	ATL	16	144	126	18	0.0	0	2	0	0	0	0	0	0	3
2004	ATL	16	101	86	15	2.5	2	1	0	3	41	14	27	0	6
2005	ATL	16	115	88	27	3.5	0	1	0	4	50	13	22	0	10
2006	ATL	16	136	95	41	2.5	0	1	0	0	0	0	0	0	1
2007	ATL	16	110	84	26	2.0	0	1	0	0	0	0	0	0	4
2008	ATL	16	102	71	31	0.0	0	0	0	0	0	0	0	0	3
2009	DAL	16	106	75	31	3.0	0	0	0	0	0	0	0	0	7
2010	DAL	16	97	73	24	1.0	0	0	0	1	41	41	41	0	7
2011	DAL	16	50	34	16	0.0	0	0	0	0	0	0	0	0	2
2012	DEN	16	54	33	21	1.0	1	0	0	0	0	0	0	0	0
Career		225	1,434	1,094	340	22.0	9	10	0	13	185	14	41	0	62

== Personal life ==
In 2003, Brooking founded The Keith Brooking Children's Foundation. He was inspired by his mother, who was a foster parent while he was growing up, to create the foundation to serve the needs of foster children in metro Atlanta. There are four programs within the foundation, including the Locker 56 Shoe Program; Be a Leader, Become a Reader; the Keith Brooking Scholarship Program; and the Keith Brooking Children's Foundation Grant Program. He was named Falcons 2002 “Man of the Year” for his extensive community involvement. He spent much of his off seasons as a player raising awareness of his foundation, visiting local schools, businesses and organizations that serve and support children. The foundation programs and services are supported by financial contributions from corporate sponsors and loyal donors, in addition, funds are raised through two yearly events as well as through grants that are awarded to the foundation by other organizations. By his actions, he was named a nominee to the Home Depot NFL Neighborhood MVP.

Brooking was named to the Georgia Tech Athletic Hall of Fame in 2007. He was inducted into the Georgia Sports Hall of Fame, in Macon, Georgia, as a member of the 2017 class.

He and his wife, Holly, have two sons, Logan and Jonah, and daughters Ella and Willa.
