= West Ashley Park =

Park in South Carolina, US

Coordinates: 32.8187°N 80.0587°W

- Interactive map of West Ashley Park
- Location: 3601 Mary Ader Drive, Charleston, South Carolina 29414
- Area: 260 acres (110 ha)
- Created: 2000
- Operator: City of Charleston

West Ashley Park is the largest municipal park in Charleston, South Carolina. It is located in the West Ashley area of the city.

The city originally bought a 99.8-acre parcel, including a lake created from an old phosphate mine, in 1985. In 1997, a neighboring property owner, Ross Development Corp., offered to deed the city six adjoining parcels in exchange for the city's constructing a road from the Glenn McConnell Parkway to the park. The estimated cost of the road was $421,100, and the appraised value of the new 161 acres being offered (a 95-acre park addition and a 66-acre wetland preserve) was $429,590.

Work on the park began in 1998 after the city was permitted to remove several large trees at the site. In 1998, Anson Construction Co. was awarded a $2.3 million contract for the park's initial development.

The park opened on April 8, 2000, to the public, but progress on new features at the park continued. By 2001, the park included four baseball fields and four soccer fields. Bicycle and pedestrian trails crisscrossed the property down to Church Creek. Although the public had been given access to the park as features were added, the formal opening of the park did not occur until 2001.

On Sundays adult recreation soccer games are held at West Ashley Park during both the Spring and the Fall seasons of the CSL.

In 2007, a disc golf course was planned, the only free course within an hour of Charleston.
