= The Forum at Ashley Park =

Regional lifestyle center in Newnan, Georgia

Coordinates: 33°23′20″N 84°45′52″W

Ashley Park
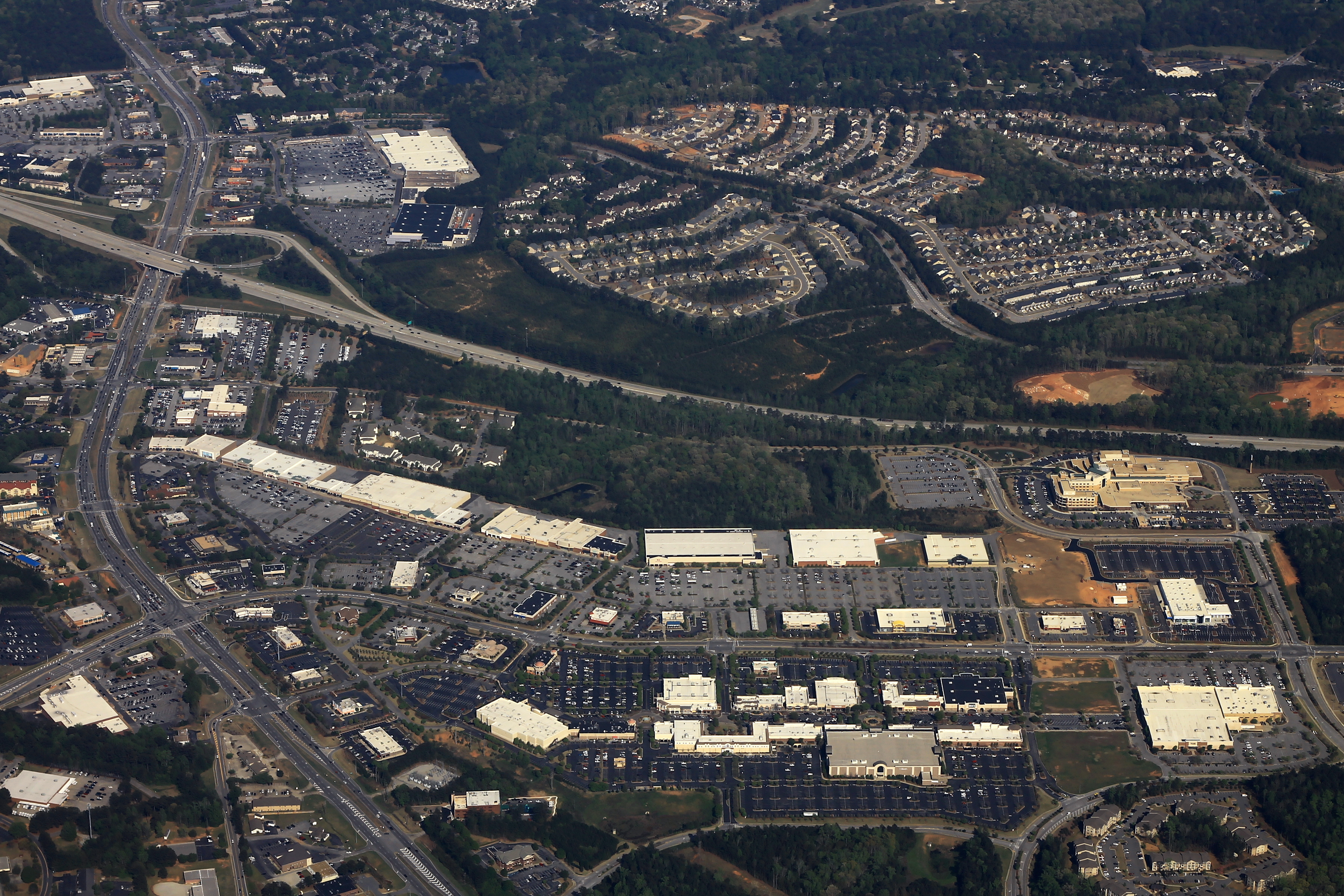
- Aerial view of the retail complex
- Location: Newnan, Georgia, United States
- Opened: 2006
- Developer: Thomas Land & Development
- Manager: Bayer Properties
- Owner: Ashley Park Property Owner, LLC Newnan, Georgia
- Num. of stores: 56
- Num. of anchor tenants: 9
- Floor area: 554,221 sq ft
- Floors: Most businesses on the first floor and a few with 2 floors.
- Parking: 1957
- Website: http://www.ashleyparknewnan.com/

Ashley Park is a regional lifestyle center in Newnan, Georgia, United States. The anchor stores are Georgian Cinemas, DSW, Best Buy, Barnes & Noble, Dick's Sporting Goods, Dillard's, Belk, and Onelife Fitness.

In 2006, the development was announced to include a 250-room hotel.

There is a strip mall across the street from the shopping center. The anchor stores at the strip mall are Rooms To Go, Hibbett Sports, Old Navy, Office Depot, Michaels, TJ Maxx, Rack Room Shoes, Target, Party City, Ashley HomeStore, Urban Air Trampoline Park, Dollar Tree, BJ's Wholesale Club, JCPenney, and At Home.

There is also a phase 3 construction project for Ashley Park which is an extension to the current shopping area and is estimated to open in 2025 which will feature multiple restaurants and stores like KPOT and Superchix.
