= Coweta County School System =

School district in Georgia (U.S. state)

Coweta County School District

Address
- 167 Werz Industrial Boulevard Newnan, Georgia, 30263-5803; United States
- Coordinates: 33.4013285°N 84.7633764°W

District information
- Grades: Pre-kindergarten – 12
- Superintendent: Evan Horton
- Accreditation(s): Southern Association of Colleges and Schools; Georgia Accrediting Commission
- NCES District ID: 1301500

Students and staff
- Enrollment: 23,200 (2022–23)
- Faculty: 1,577.30 (FTE)
- Staff: 1,563.50 (FTE)
- Student–teacher ratio: 14.71

Other information
- Telephone: (770) 254-2800
- Website: cowetaschools.net

The Coweta County School District is the primary education system in Coweta County, Georgia, United States. Its headquarters are an antebellum building on Jackson Street (US 29) at Sprayberry Road in Newnan, Georgia. Coweta County is the 9th-fastest-growing county in Georgia and the 26th-fastest-growing in the country. The school system has grown from 9,210 students in 1984 to over 22,000 students in 2007.

== Overview ==
The school system operates eighteen elementary schools, six middle schools and three high schools, serving an area of 431 square miles (1,120 km^{2}) with approximately 22,000 students and 1,200 teachers.

=== Elementary schools ===
- Arbor Springs Elementary
- Arnco-Sargent Elementary
- Atkinson Elementary
- Brooks Elementary
- Canongate Elementary
- Eastside Elementary
- Elm Street Elementary
- Grantville Elementary
- Jefferson Parkway Elementary
- Moreland Elementary
- Newnan Crossing Elementary
- Northside Elementary
- Poplar Road Elementary
- Ruth Hill Elementary
- Thomas Crossroads Elementary
- Western Elementary
- Welch Elementary
- White Oak Elementary
- Willis Road Elementary

=== Middle schools ===
- Arnall Middle School
- Blake Bass Middle School
- East Coweta Middle School
- Evans Middle School
- Lee Middle School
- Madras Middle School
- Maggie Brown Middle School
- Smokey Road Middle School
- Central Education Center (CEC) - 8th Grade Academy

=== High schools ===
- Newnan High School
- East Coweta High School
- Northgate High School
- Central Education Center (CEC)
- Winston Dowdell Academy

== Controversies ==
=== Board member's participation in Capitol insurrection ===
Roughly a week after the January 6th insurrection at the U.S. Capitol, it was revealed Coweta school board member Linda Menk had attended the rally in Washington, D.C. Menk, after facing backlash from the community, refused to resign from her position, and urged her fellow board members that October to leave the Georgia School Boards Association after its parent organization, the National School Boards Association, sent a letter to the Biden presidential administration urging an investigation into the "growing number of threats of violence and acts of intimidation occurring across the nation." Menk ended up resigning in late 2022.

== See also ==
- List of school districts in Georgia
- The Heritage School, Newnan
- Trinity Christian School (Sharpsburg, Georgia)
