= Sharpsburg, Georgia =

- Town
- Location in Coweta County and the state of Georgia
- Coordinates: 33°20′22″N 84°39′1″W
- Country: United States
- State: Georgia
- County: Coweta

Area
  - Total: 0.98 sq mi (2.53 km^{2})
  - Land: 0.97 sq mi (2.51 km^{2})
  - Water: 0.0077 sq mi (0.02 km^{2})
- Elevation: 925 ft (282 m)

Population (2020)
  - Total: 327
  - Density: 337.4/sq mi (130.29/km^{2})
- Time zone: UTC-5 (Eastern (EST))
  - Summer (DST): UTC-4 (EDT)
- ZIP code: 30277
- Area codes: 770, 678
- FIPS code: 13-69980
- GNIS feature ID: 0333018
- Website: sharpsburg-ga.gov

Sharpsburg (ˈʃɑrpsbɝg) is a town in Coweta County, Georgia, United States. It is part of the Atlanta metropolitan area. Its population was 327 at the 2020 census.

== History ==
The Georgia General Assembly incorporated Sharpsburg as a town in 1871. The community was named after Judge Elias Sharp, a local city commissioner.

== Geography ==
Sharpsburg is located in eastern Coweta County at 33°20′22″N 84°39′1″W (33.339337, -84.650155). The town of Turin is immediately to the southeast. Georgia State Route 16 runs through the southern part of Sharpsburg, leading west 10 miles (16 km) to Newnan, the county seat, and southeast 7 miles (11 km) to Senoia. GA 54 leads northeast 5 miles (8 km) to Peachtree City.

According to the United States Census Bureau, Sharpsburg has a total area of 0.60 square miles (1.55 km^{2}), of which 0.004 square miles (0.01 km^{2}), or 0.66%, is water.

== Demographics ==
Historical population
Census	Pop.	Note	%±
1880	110		—
1890	177		60.9%
1900	137		−22.6%
1910	166		21.2%
1920	170		2.4%
1930	137		−19.4%
1940	114		−16.8%
1950	133		16.7%
1960	155		16.5%
1970	161		3.9%
1980	194		20.5%
1990	224		15.5%
2000	316		41.1%
2010	341		7.9%
2020	327		−4.1%
2025 (est.)	325	▲	−0.6%
U.S. Decennial Census

In 2000, there were 316 people, 125 households, and 86 families residing in the town. In 2020, its population was 327.

== Education ==
Public education in Sharpsburg is operated by Coweta County School System, with schools including East Coweta High School.

Private schools in the town include Trinity Christian School and Central Christian School.

Faith Lutheran Preschool is a preschool of Faith Lutheran Church in Sharpsburg.

== Notable people ==
- Keith Brooking, football player
- Janet Dykman, Olympic archery champion
- Brooke Hendrix, soccer player
- Allan Kayser, actor
- Josh Andrew Koenig, actor
- Rusty Stevens, actor
- Lynn Westmoreland, politician
