= The Heritage School (Newnan, Georgia) =

Private school in Newnan, Georgia, United States

Location
- 2093 Highway 29 North; Newnan, Georgia 30263; United States
- 33.4281911°N 84.7602026°W

Information
- Type: Private school
- Motto: Think Beyond.
- Established: 1970
- NCES School ID: 00297361
- Head of school: Kristin Skelly
- Teaching staff: 55 (on an FTE basis)
- Grades: PK-12
- Gender: Co-educational
- Enrollment: 457 (including 11 Pre-K students) (2019–2020)
- Student to teacher ratio: 7.8
- Campus type: Suburban
- Colors: Red, white, blue
- Athletics conference: GHSA
- Mascot: Hawk
- Nickname: Hawks
- Accreditations: Southern Association of Independent Schools
- Website: www.heritageschool.com

The Heritage School is a co-educational private school in Newnan, Georgia, United States. Established in 1970, from its founding, the Heritage School maintained an open admissions policy, although initially no black students applied nor were enrolled. The National Association of Independent Schools, which insisted on open-admissions policies for all its member schools, admitted the Heritage School to its membership in 1970. According to historian Love Williams, the school's Federal Tax exempt status granted in 1970 was entirely conditioned upon the school having a racially inclusive enrollment policy. The school is a member of the Georgia High School Association (GHSA), and is accredited by the Southern Association of Independent Schools (SAIS). It received full re-accreditation in 2022.

== History ==
As he was being interviewed by the first Board of Trustees, the first Headmaster of the Heritage School, George H. Keller, Jr., made it a condition of his acceptance to the post that the school not be a segregation academy. The school was founded in 1970, and the school received a Federally recognized tax-exemption based on its non-discriminatory policy. Before opening, the school ran newspaper advertisements informing the community of its non-discriminatory policy.

The IRS decision to grant tax exempt status to the school was investigated by Senate Select Committee on Equal Education Opportunity. Senator Walter Mondale asked IRS commissioner Randolph W. Thrower to explain why the school had been granted tax exempt status in light of a report that the school's headmaster told an NAACP investigator that "no black applicants were expected" but the investigator's children could apply if they "had $750 in their ass pocket." Commissioner Thrower, who was himself a champion of civil rights, dismissed Mondale's allegations of racism on the grounds that "sometimes charges are inaccurate and sometimes they are recklessly made."

The following year the school's board agreed to waive the tuition for enrollment for black enrollees selected for admission.

== Athletics ==
In 2018, the school joined the Georgia High School Association in the 4-A private division. It previously competed in the Georgia Independent School Association. In the winter of 2022, the school elected to return to GISA due to the GHSA's new policy of multiplying "out of district students." The vast majority of Heritage students are what the GHSA considers "Out of district." This GHSA policy resulted in many independent schools leaving the GHSA because it would have put them at a competitive disadvantage against much larger public schools.

== Demographics ==
The demographic breakdown of the 414 K-12 students enrolled for 2019–20 was:

- Asian – 5.4%
- Black – 4%
- Hispanic – 2.6%
- White – 77.8%
- Multiracial – 3.7%

National Center for Education Statistics (NCES) does not compile demographic information for Pre-K students.
