= Trinity Christian School (Sharpsburg, Georgia) =

Private Christian school in Sharpsburg, Georgia, United States

Location
- 8817 Highway 54 West; Sharpsburg, Georgia 30263; United States; 33°24′24″N 84°38′19″W

Information
- Type: Private Christian School
- Religious affiliations: Christian, non-denominational
- Founded: 1991
- Status: Open and active
- Head of school: Dr. Mark J. Anthony
- Grades: PreK–12
- Enrollment: 1,496
- Colors: Purple and black
- Athletics conference: GHSA
- Nickname: Lions
- Yearbook: The Roar
- Website: www.tcslions.org

Trinity Christian School (TCS) is a non-denominational, preschool through 12th grade, private Christian school in Sharpsburg, GA. Bordering Fayette and Coweta counties, Trinity currently enrolls over 1,500 students as of the current school year. TCS is ranked as one of the top private Christian Schools in Georgia according to Niche.com.

== Credentials ==
Trinity Christian School is accredited by Cognia (formerly AdvancEd). In addition, TCS is a member of the International League of Christian Schools (ILCS). These affiliations qualify our students to be eligible for state scholarships and ensures credit recognition to any college or school in the country. TCS is also a member of the Georgia High School Association.

== History ==
In the fall of 1991, Fayette Fellowship (now Trinity Church) began a Christian preschool. By 1994, an elementary school offering kindergarten through third grade was offered.

The present elementary building was constructed and occupied in 1999. It quickly reached capacity, leading to the 2004 construction of the Newton Center, a building which included 12 new classrooms, a large gymnasium, fellowship hall/cafeteria, and facilities for the growing music, sports, drama and P.E. programs. This expansion also accommodated the first high school class in the fall of 2005.

In August 2009, grades 8–12 were relocated to the original campus of Crossroads Church to accommodate increased high school growth. High school classrooms were housed in the sanctuary building while The Hanger provided space for lunch and P.E. classes. Modular units were utilized for special meeting rooms and additional classroom space.

In August 2012, a new middle school building was completed at TCS’ main campus and now houses 6th–8th grades, which allowed for expanded growth in the elementary school.

In 2022, TCS expanded its reach by joining forces with Griffin Christian School in Griffin, GA to form Trinity Christian School Griffin (TCSG). Combined with a student enrollment of more than 300 students at TCSG, the total enrollment across both campuses is over 1,900.
