= East Coweta High School =

Public high school in Coweta County, Georgia, United States

Location
- 400 McCollum-Sharpsburg Road; Sharpsburg, Georgia 30276; United States; 33.347°N 84.656°W

Information
- Type: Public
- Established: 1946
- School district: Coweta County School System
- Principal: Stephen Allen
- Staff: 169.50 (on FTE basis)
- Grades: 9 to 12
- Enrollment: 3,001 (2024-2025)
- Student to teacher ratio: 17.71
- Colors: Purple and gold
- Mascot: Indian
- Website: echs.cowetaschools.net

East Coweta High School (ECHS) is a public high school located in Coweta County, Georgia, United States. It serves about 3,300 students in grades 9 to 12 in the Coweta County School System. Founded in 1946, it is the second oldest high school in the county.

== History ==
East Coweta High School was founded on April 17, 1946 when the Coweta County School Board ordered that the Haralson, Raymond, Starr, and Senoia school operate East Coweta High School at Starr School for the ensuing year. This resulted from a series of consolidations begun years earlier. In the fall of 1988, the high school students of Moreland, East Newnan, White Oak, Major, the traditional East Coweta area, and all parts in between merged to culminate the consolidation efforts begun so long ago.

=== Other consolidations ===
These major consolidated schools ultimately resulted in the present East Coweta High School.

- Preston Academy - Preston Hall houses the Main Office, Guidance Office, and Attendance Office. Preston Academy was the oldest documented school in East Coweta County (1827?-1884).
- Brantley Institute - Brantley Halls, East and West, house the English, and Social Studies. Brantley Institute of Senoia was recognized as the leading school of its day in a multiple county area.
- Longstreet Institute of the Ebenezer/Coke's Chapel community - Longstreet Institute was the major antebellum school in a multi-county area, producing a host of outstanding alumni. Longstreet Hall is the main hall of the school, running the length of the building.
- Starr High School of Sharpsburg - Starr Hall is the history and business education hall. Starr High School was the first consolidated high school in Coweta County.
- Moreland High School - Moreland Hall is the science hall. Moreland High School was the major consolidated high school for south central Coweta County.
- Haralson High School - Haralson High School was the major consolidated high school for extreme southeastern Coweta County. Haralson Hall is the fine arts hall.
- Rock Springs Academy/School - Located in the community of Major, Rock Springs Academy/School was the most significant school in northeastern Coweta County. Rock Springs is the name of the greenhouse at ECHS.

=== Notable educators ===
Educational leaders who founded and strengthened the school system include:

- Radford Edward Pitman (1835–1880) was Coweta County's first public school superintendent (1871–1880). He was a settler on the land on which East Coweta High School is currently located. He was the great-grandfather of Eddie Hewlette Pitman, who provided the land for the school. Pitman Hall is now known as the Media Center.
- Hoke Smith was a lawyer, publisher, politician, educator and crusader for improving education in rural schools of Georgia. In 1901, Smith donated to Coweta County Schools its first library. Hoke Smith Reading Room is now referred to as the Career Center.
- Sarah Fisher Brown - Brown High School of Moreland was the major black high school of its era; it was founded by and named for Brown, an innovative educator. Brown Hall is the Technology/Career Education (Vocation) hall.
- Walter B. Hill - Walter B. Hill Industrial School was a major black area school. Walter Hill was named for the long-time state supervisor of black schools. It closed in 1954 when it was consolidated into Eastside School. Walter B. Hill Courts is the name of the school's tennis courts.

== Notable alumni ==
- Tim Van Egmond (1987), baseball player
- Keith Brooking (1994), football player
- Karsten Bailey (1995), football player
- Chris Hanson (1995), football player
- John Keith (1995), football player
- Ashley Martin (1999), first woman to play and score in an NCAA Division I American football game and police officer
- Chris Young (1999), football player
- Brad Emaus (2004), baseball player
- Nate Novarro (2004), drummer for the band Cobra Starship
- Joe Fraser (2008), football & baseball player
- Cam Bedrosian (2010), baseball player
- Madarious Gibbs (2011), basketball player
- Conner Antley (2014), soccer player
- Chris Youngblood (2020), basketball player
