= List of Tri-State Conference (1960–1981) football standings =

This is a list of yearly Tri-State Conference football standings.

== Tri-State Conference football standings ==
=== NAIA (1960–1969) ===
1960 Tri-State Conference football standings
	Conf.					Overall
Team	W		L		T	W		L		T
Concordia (NE) $	5	–	0	–	1	7	–	1	–	1
Midland	5	–	1	–	0	7	–	1	–	0
Sioux Falls	4	–	2	–	0	6	–	2	–	0
Westmar	3	–	2	–	1	3	–	4	–	1
Dana	2	–	4	–	0	2	–	6	–	0
Yankton	1	–	5	–	0	1	–	7	–	0
Northwestern (IA)	0	–	6	–	0	0	–	6	–	0
$ – Conference champion

1961 Tri-State Conference football standings
	Conf.					Overall
Team	W		L		T	W		L		T
Midland $	5	–	1	–	0	6	–	2	–	0
Dana	4	–	2	–	0	5	–	3	–	0
Westmar	4	–	2	–	0	4	–	4	–	0
Northwestern (IA)	3	–	3	–	0	3	–	4	–	1
Concordia (NE)	2	–	4	–	0	3	–	6	–	0
Yankton	2	–	4	–	0	5	–	4	–	0
Sioux Falls	1	–	5	–	0	1	–	8	–	0
$ – Conference champion

1962 Tri-State Conference football standings
	Conf.					Overall
Team	W		L		T	W		L		T
Dana +	5	–	1	–	0	6	–	3	–	0
Concordia (NE) +	5	–	1	–	0	7	–	2	–	0
Midland	4	–	2	–	0	6	–	2	–	0
Westmar	4	–	2	–	0	5	–	4	–	0
Yankton	2	–	4	–	0	3	–	6	–	0
Sioux Falls	1	–	5	–	0	1	–	8	–	0
Northwestern (IA)	0	–	6	–	0	0	–	8	–	0
+ – Conference co-champions

1963 Tri-State Conference football standings
	Conf.					Overall
Team	W		L		T	W		L		T
Midland $	5	–	0	–	1	6	–	1	–	1
Concordia (NE)	5	–	1	–	0	6	–	3	–	0
Westmar	4	–	1	–	1	6	–	1	–	2
Northwestern (IA)	3	–	3	–	0	4	–	4	–	0
Dana	2	–	4	–	0	2	–	6	–	0
Yankton	1	–	5	–	0	1	–	8	–	0
Sioux Falls	0	–	6	–	0	1	–	7	–	0
$ – Conference champion

1964 Tri-State Conference football standings
	Conf.					Overall
Team	W		L		T	W		L		T
Westmar $	5	–	1	–	0	8	–	1	–	0
Northwestern (IA)	4	–	2	–	0	6	–	2	–	0
Yankton	4	–	2	–	0	5	–	4	–	0
Midland	4	–	2	–	0	4	–	4	–	0
Concordia (NE)	3	–	3	–	0	5	–	4	–	0
Dana	1	–	5	–	0	2	–	6	–	0
Sioux Falls	0	–	6	–	0	0	–	9	–	0
$ – Conference champion

1965 Tri-State Conference football standings
	Conf.					Overall
Team	W		L		T	W		L		T
Westmar +	5	–	1	–	0	7	–	1	–	1
Midland +	5	–	1	–	0	6	–	2	–	0
Yankton	4	–	2	–	0	7	–	2	–	0
Concordia (NE)	3	–	3	–	0	6	–	3	–	0
Dana	2	–	4	–	0	2	–	6	–	0
Northwestern (IA)	1	–	5	–	0	2	–	6	–	0
Sioux Falls	1	–	5	–	0	2	–	7	–	0
+ – Conference co-champions

1966 Tri-State Conference football standings
	Conf.					Overall
Team	W		L		T	W		L		T
Yankton +	5	–	1	–	0	8	–	1	–	0
Westmar +	5	–	1	–	0	7	–	2	–	0
Sioux Falls	4	–	2	–	0	6	–	3	–	0
Dana	2	–	4	–	0	3	–	5	–	0
Concordia (NE)	2	–	4	–	0	2	–	5	–	2
Midland	2	–	4	–	0	2	–	6	–	0
Northwestern (IA)	1	–	5	–	0	2	–	6	–	0
+ – Conference co-champions

1967 Tri-State Conference football standings
	Conf.					Overall
Team	W		L		T	W		L		T
Westmar $	6	–	0	–	0	8	–	1	–	0
Yankton	5	–	1	–	0	8	–	1	–	0
Sioux Falls	4	–	2	–	0	7	–	2	–	0
Dana	2	–	3	–	1	2	–	4	–	2
Midland	1	–	3	–	2	2	–	6	–	0
Concordia (NE)	1	–	5	–	0	2	–	7	–	0
Northwestern (IA)	0	–	5	–	1	0	–	7	–	1
$ – Conference champion

1968 Tri-State Conference football standings
	Conf.					Overall
Team	W		L		T	W		L		T
Westmar $	6	–	0	–	0	9	–	0	–	0
Concordia (NE)	5	–	1	–	0	6	–	3	–	0
Northwestern (IA)	4	–	2	–	0	7	–	2	–	0
Dana	2	–	4	–	0	3	–	6	–	0
Sioux Falls	2	–	4	–	0	3	–	6	–	0
Yankton	1	–	4	–	1	1	–	7	–	1
Midland	0	–	5	–	1	0	–	8	–	1
$ – Conference champion

1969 Tri-State Conference football standings
	Conf.					Overall
Team	W		L		T	W		L		T
Yankton $	5	–	1	–	0	8	–	1	–	0
Concordia (NE)	4	–	1	–	1	4	–	5	–	1
Northwestern (IA)	4	–	2	–	0	7	–	2	–	0
Westmar	3	–	3	–	0	5	–	4	–	0
Dana	2	–	3	–	1	2	–	6	–	1
Midland	1	–	5	–	0	1	–	7	–	0
Sioux Falls	1	–	5	–	0	1	–	8	–	0
$ – Conference champion

=== NAIA Division II (1970–1980) ===
1970 Tri-State Conference football standings
	Conf.					Overall
Team	W		L		T	W		L		T
No. 14 Yankton $	6	–	0	–	0	8	–	2	–	0
No. 13 Concordia (NE)	5	–	1	–	0	8	–	1	–	0
Northwestern (IA)	4	–	2	–	0	6	–	3	–	0
Westmar	3	–	3	–	0	5	–	4	–	0
Dana	2	–	4	–	0	3	–	6	–	0
Midland	1	–	5	–	0	1	–	8	–	0
Sioux Falls	0	–	6	–	0	0	–	9	–	0
$ – Conference champion; Rankings from NAIA Division II poll

1971 Tri-State Conference football standings
	Conf.					Overall
Team	W		L		T	W		L		T
Northwestern (IA) $	4	–	1	–	0	6	–	3	–	0
Westmar	3	–	2	–	0	4	–	4	–	1
Concordia-St. Paul	3	–	2	–	0	4	–	5	–	0
Yankton	2	–	3	–	0	5	–	3	–	1
Bethel (MN)	1	–	4	–	0	1	–	8	–	0
Sioux Falls	0	–	5	–	0	0	–	8	–	1
$ – Conference champion

1972 Tri-State Conference football standings
	Conf.					Overall
Team	W		L		T	W		L		T
No. 2 Northwestern (IA) $^	5	–	0	–	0	10	–	1	–	0
Westmar	4	–	1	–	0	5	–	4	–	0
Concordia (MN)	2	–	3	–	0	4	–	4	–	0
Bethel (MN)	2	–	3	–	0	3	–	6	–	0
Sioux Falls	1	–	4	–	0	5	–	4	–	0
Yankton	1	–	4	–	0	2	–	7	–	0
$ – Conference champion; ^ – NAIA Division II playoff participant; Rankings from NAIA Division II poll

1973 Tri-State Conference football standings
	Conf.					Overall
Team	W		L		T	W		L		T
No. 1 Northwestern (IA) $^	5	–	0	–	0	12	–	0	–	0
No. 14 Yankton	4	–	1	–	0	7	–	2	–	0
Sioux Falls	2	–	3	–	0	5	–	5	–	0
Westmar	2	–	3	–	0	3	–	5	–	0
Bethel (MN)	2	–	3	–	0	3	–	6	–	0
Concordia (MN)	0	–	5	–	0	2	–	7	–	0
$ – Conference champion; ^ – NAIA Division II playoff participant; Rankings from NAIA Division II poll

1974 Tri-State Conference football standings
	Conf.					Overall
Team	W		L		T	W		L		T
No. 10 Northwestern (IA) $	5	–	0	–	0	8	–	2	–	0
No. 20 Yankton	4	–	1	–	0	7	–	2	–	0
Bethel (MN)	2	–	3	–	0	5	–	4	–	0
Sioux Falls	2	–	3	–	0	4	–	5	–	0
Westmar	2	–	3	–	0	3	–	5	–	0
Concordia (MN)	0	–	5	–	0	2	–	7	–	0
$ – Conference champion; Rankings from NAIA Division II poll

1975 Tri-State Conference football standings
	Conf.					Overall
Team	W		L		T	W		L		T
Bethel (MN) +	3	–	1	–	0	7	–	2	–	0
No. 19 Northwestern (IA) +	3	–	1	–	0	7	–	2	–	1
Yankton +	3	–	1	–	0	6	–	4	–	0
Westmar	1	–	3	–	0	2	–	6	–	0
Sioux Falls	0	–	4	–	0	2	–	7	–	0
+ – Conference co-champions; Rankings from NAIA Division II poll

1976 Tri-State Conference football standings
	Conf.					Overall
Team	W		L		T	W		L		T
Northwestern (IA) $	4	–	0	–	0	5	–	5	–	0
Bethel (MN)	3	–	1	–	0	7	–	2	–	0
Yankton	2	–	2	–	0	0	–	6	–	4
Sioux Falls	1	–	3	–	0	1	–	8	–	0
Westmar	0	–	4	–	0	0	–	9	–	0
$ – Conference champion

1977 Tri-State Conference football standings
	Conf.					Overall
Team	W		L		T	W		L		T
Northwestern (IA) $	2	–	0	–	0	6	–	4	–	0
Westmar	1	–	1	–	0	2	–	8	–	0
Sioux Falls	0	–	2	–	0	0	–	9	–	0
$ – Conference champion; Northwestern (IA) and Sioux Falls played twice, but only the first meeting counted in the conference standings.

1978 Tri-State Conference football standings
	Conf.					Overall
Team	W		L		T	W		L		T
No. 7 Northwestern (IA) $^	2	–	0	–	0	9	–	2	–	0
Westmar	2	–	1	–	0	8	–	2	–	0
Yankton	0	–	3	–	0	1	–	8	–	1
$ – Conference champion; ^ – NAIA Division II playoff participant; Rankings from NAIA Division II poll

1979 Tri-State Conference football standings
	Conf.					Overall
Team	W		L		T	W		L		T
No. 3 Northwestern (IA) $^	2	–	0	–	0	10	–	2	–	0
No. 20 Westmar	2	–	1	–	0	7	–	3	–	0
Yankton	0	–	3	–	0	5	–	6	–	0
$ – Conference champion; ^ – NAIA Division II playoff participant; Rankings from NAIA Division II poll

1980 Tri-State Conference football standings
	Conf.					Overall
Team	W		L		T	W		L		T
Northwestern (IA)	2	–	0	–	0	6	–	3	–	0
Westmar	1	–	1	–	0	7	–	3	–	0
Yankton	0	–	2	–	0	3	–	7	–	0
$ – Conference champion
