= 1983 NAIA Division II football season =

American college football season

- Regular season: August–November 1983
- Postseason: November–December 1983
- National Championship: Lincoln Bowl; Tacoma, WA
- Champions: Northwestern (IA)

The 1983 NAIA Division II football season, as part of the 1983 college football season in the United States and the 28th season of college football sponsored by the NAIA, was the 14th season of play of the NAIA's lower division for football.

The season was played from August to November 1983 and culminated in the 1983 NAIA Division II Football National Championship, played at the Lincoln Bowl near the campus of Pacific Lutheran University in Tacoma, Washington.

The Northwestern Red Raiders defeated the Pacific Lutheran Lutes in the championship game, 25–21, to win their second NAIA national title (and first since 1973).

== Conference standings ==
1983 Frontier Conference football standings
| | Conf. | | | | | Overall |
| Team | W | | L | | T | W | | L | | T |
|---|---|---|---|---|---|---|---|---|---|---|
| No. 11 Montana Tech $ | 6 | – | 0 | – | 0 | 7 | – | 3 | – | 0 |
| Western Montana | 3 | – | 3 | – | 0 | 3 | – | 7 | – | 0 |
| Carroll (MT) | 2 | – | 4 | – | 0 | 2 | – | 7 | – | 0 |
| Rocky Mountain | 1 | – | 5 | – | 0 | 2 | – | 6 | – | 0 |
$ – Conference champion; Rankings from NAIA Division II poll

1983 Heart of America Athletic Conference football standings
| | Conf. | | | | | Overall |
| Team | W | | L | | T | W | | L | | T |
|---|---|---|---|---|---|---|---|---|---|---|
| No. 2 Baker $^ | 7 | – | 0 | – | 0 | 10 | – | 1 | – | 0 |
| No. 7 William Jewell ^ | 5 | – | 1 | – | 1 | 9 | – | 2 | – | 1 |
| No. 13 Missouri Valley | 5 | – | 1 | – | 1 | 7 | – | 2 | – | 1 |
| Graceland | 4 | – | 3 | – | 0 | 7 | – | 3 | – | 0 |
| MidAmerica Nazarene | 3 | – | 4 | – | 0 | 5 | – | 5 | – | 0 |
| Tarkio | 2 | – | 5 | – | 0 | 3 | – | 7 | – | 0 |
| Central Methodist | 1 | – | 6 | – | 0 | 1 | – | 9 | – | 0 |
| Culver–Stockton | 0 | – | 7 | – | 0 | 1 | – | 9 | – | 0 |
+ – Conference co-champions; ^ – NAIA Division II playoff participant; Rankings from NAIA Division II poll

1983 Hoosier–Buckeye Conference football standings
| | Conf. | | | | | Overall |
| Team | W | | L | | T | W | | L | | T |
|---|---|---|---|---|---|---|---|---|---|---|
| No. 6 Findlay +^ | 6 | – | 1 | – | 0 | 8 | – | 2 | – | 0 |
| No. 3 Wilmington (OH) +^ | 6 | – | 1 | – | 0 | 8 | – | 2 | – | 0 |
| No. 18 Anderson (IN) | 5 | – | 2 | – | 0 | 6 | – | 3 | – | 0 |
| Earlham | 4 | – | 3 | – | 0 | 6 | – | 3 | – | 0 |
| Hanover | 3 | – | 4 | – | 0 | 5 | – | 4 | – | 0 |
| Defiance | 3 | – | 4 | – | 0 | 5 | – | 4 | – | 0 |
| Manchester (IN) | 1 | – | 6 | – | 0 | 2 | – | 7 | – | 0 |
| Bluffton | 0 | – | 7 | – | 0 | 0 | – | 9 | – | 0 |
+ – Conference co-champions; ^ – NAIA Division II playoff participant; Rankings from NAIA Division II poll

1983 Kansas Collegiate Athletic Conference football standings
| | Conf. | | | | | Overall |
| Team | W | | L | | T | W | | L | | T |
|---|---|---|---|---|---|---|---|---|---|---|
| No. 9 Southwestern (KS) $ | 8 | – | 0 | – | 1 | 8 | – | 2 | – | 1 |
| No. 10 Bethany (KS) | 7 | – | 2 | – | 0 | 8 | – | 2 | – | 0 |
| No. 19 Sterling | 6 | – | 2 | – | 1 | 6 | – | 2 | – | 1 |
| Bethel (KS) | 6 | – | 3 | – | 0 | 6 | – | 3 | – | 0 |
| St. Mary of the Plains | 4 | – | 5 | – | 0 | 4 | – | 6 | – | 0 |
| Kansas Wesleyan | 3 | – | 6 | – | 0 | 3 | – | 7 | – | 0 |
| Ottawa | 3 | – | 6 | – | 0 | 3 | – | 7 | – | 0 |
| McPherson | 2 | – | 6 | – | 1 | 2 | – | 6 | – | 1 |
| Tabor | 2 | – | 6 | – | 1 | 2 | – | 6 | – | 1 |
| Friends | 2 | – | 7 | – | 0 | 2 | – | 7 | – | 0 |
$ – Conference champion; Rankings from NAIA Division II poll

1983 Minnesota Intercollegiate Athletic Conference football standings
| | Conf. | | | | | Overall |
| Team | W | | L | | T | W | | L | | T |
|---|---|---|---|---|---|---|---|---|---|---|
| No. 4 St. Thomas (MN) $^ | 9 | – | 0 | – | 0 | 9 | – | 2 | – | 0 |
| Saint John's (MN) | 7 | – | 2 | – | 0 | 7 | – | 4 | – | 0 |
| Hamline | 6 | – | 3 | – | 0 | 6 | – | 4 | – | 0 |
| Gustavus Adolphus | 5 | – | 4 | – | 0 | 6 | – | 4 | – | 0 |
| Macalester | 5 | – | 4 | – | 0 | 6 | – | 4 | – | 0 |
| Concordia–Moorhead | 4 | – | 5 | – | 0 | 5 | – | 6 | – | 0 |
| Augsburg | 3 | – | 6 | – | 0 | 4 | – | 7 | – | 0 |
| St. Olaf | 3 | – | 6 | – | 0 | 3 | – | 7 | – | 0 |
| Bethel (MN) | 2 | – | 7 | – | 0 | 2 | – | 8 | – | 0 |
| Carleton | 1 | – | 8 | – | 0 | 2 | – | 8 | – | 0 |
$ – Conference champion; ^ – NAIA Division II playoff participant; Rankings from NAIA Division II poll

1983 Nebraska Intercollegiate Athletic Conference football standings
| | Conf. | | | | | Overall |
| Team | W | | L | | T | W | | L | | T |
|---|---|---|---|---|---|---|---|---|---|---|
| Nebraska Wesleyan + | 4 | – | 1 | – | 0 | 7 | – | 3 | – | 0 |
| Doane + | 4 | – | 1 | – | 0 | 7 | – | 3 | – | 0 |
| Concordia (NE) | 3 | – | 2 | – | 0 | 7 | – | 3 | – | 0 |
| No. 17 Midland | 3 | – | 2 | – | 0 | 6 | – | 3 | – | 0 |
| Hastings | 1 | – | 4 | – | 0 | 5 | – | 5 | – | 0 |
| Dana | 0 | – | 5 | – | 0 | 1 | – | 8 | – | 0 |
+ – Conference co-champions; Rankings from NAIA Division II poll

1983 North Dakota College Athletic Conference football standings
| | Conf. | | | | | Overall |
| Team | W | | L | | T | W | | L | | T |
|---|---|---|---|---|---|---|---|---|---|---|
| No. 15 Minot State + | 5 | – | 1 | – | 0 | 7 | – | 2 | – | 0 |
| Valley City State + | 5 | – | 1 | – | 0 | 6 | – | 3 | – | 0 |
| No. 20 Dickinson State | 4 | – | 2 | – | 0 | 7 | – | 2 | – | 0 |
| Jamestown | 4 | – | 2 | – | 0 | 7 | – | 2 | – | 0 |
| Mayville State | 2 | – | 4 | – | 0 | 4 | – | 5 | – | 0 |
| Bismarck JC | 1 | – | 5 | – | 0 | 3 | – | 5 | – | 0 |
| North Dakota Science | 0 | – | 6 | – | 0 | 1 | – | 8 | – | 0 |
+ – Conference co-champions; Rankings from NAIA Division II poll

1983 Northwest Conference football standings
| | Conf. | | | | | Overall |
| Team | W | | L | | T | W | | L | | T |
|---|---|---|---|---|---|---|---|---|---|---|
| No. 8 Pacific Lutheran $^ | 4 | – | 1 | – | 0 | 9 | – | 3 | – | 0 |
| No. 14 Linfield | 3 | – | 1 | – | 1 | 6 | – | 2 | – | 1 |
| Whitworth | 3 | – | 1 | – | 1 | 5 | – | 3 | – | 1 |
| Lewis & Clark | 2 | – | 3 | – | 0 | 4 | – | 5 | – | 0 |
| Pacific (OR) | 1 | – | 4 | – | 0 | 4 | – | 5 | – | 0 |
| Willamette | 1 | – | 4 | – | 0 | 1 | – | 8 | – | 0 |
$ – Conference champion; ^ – NAIA Division II playoff participant; Rankings from NAIA Division II poll

1983 South Dakota Intercollegiate Conference football standings
| | Conf. | | | | | Overall |
| Team | W | | L | | T | W | | L | | T |
|---|---|---|---|---|---|---|---|---|---|---|
| Black Hills State $ | 5 | – | 0 | – | 2 | 5 | – | 2 | – | 2 |
| Dakota State | 5 | – | 1 | – | 1 | 5 | – | 4 | – | 1 |
| South Dakota Tech | 5 | – | 2 | – | 0 | 5 | – | 4 | – | 0 |
| Yankton | 4 | – | 2 | – | 1 | 5 | – | 3 | – | 2 |
| Sioux Falls | 3 | – | 3 | – | 1 | 5 | – | 4 | – | 1 |
| Huron | 1 | – | 4 | – | 2 | 1 | – | 7 | – | 2 |
| Dakota Wesleyan | 1 | – | 6 | – | 0 | 1 | – | 9 | – | 0 |
| South Dakota–Springfield | 0 | – | 6 | – | 1 | 1 | – | 8 | – | 1 |
$ – Conference champion

1983 Texas Intercollegiate Athletic Association football standings
| | Conf. | | | | | Overall |
| Team | W | | L | | T | W | | L | | T |
|---|---|---|---|---|---|---|---|---|---|---|
| McMurry + | 4 | – | 2 | – | 0 | 6 | – | 3 | – | 0 |
| Sul Ross + | 4 | – | 2 | – | 0 | 5 | – | 3 | – | 0 |
| Austin | 3 | – | 3 | – | 0 | 6 | – | 4 | – | 0 |
| Tarleton State | 1 | – | 5 | – | 0 | 2 | – | 7 | – | 0 |
+ – Conference co-champions

1983 NAIA Division II independents football records
| | Conf. | | | Overall |
| Team | W | L | T | W | | L | | T |
|---|---|---|---|---|---|---|---|---|
| No. 1 Northwestern (IA) ^ | | – | | 14 | – | 0 | – | 0 |
| No. 5 Westminster (PA) ^ | | – | | 9 | – | 2 | – | 0 |
| No. 12 Loras | | – | | 8 | – | 2 | – | 1 |
| No. 16 Iowa Wesleyan | | – | | 7 | – | 2 | – | 1 |
| Texas Lutheran | | – | | 7 | – | 3 | – | 0 |
| Azusa Pacific | | – | | 6 | – | 3 | – | 0 |
| Waynesburg | | – | | 6 | – | 3 | – | 1 |
| Benedictine (KS) | | – | | 6 | – | 4 | – | 0 |
| Geneva | | – | | 5 | – | 4 | – | 0 |
| Peru State | | – | | 4 | – | 5 | – | 0 |
| Cal Lutheran | | – | | 4 | – | 6 | – | 0 |
| Chadron State | | – | | 4 | – | 6 | – | 0 |
| Oklahoma Panhandle State | | – | | 3 | – | 7 | – | 0 |
| Westmar | | – | | 2 | – | 7 | – | 1 |
| Evangel | | – | | 2 | – | 8 | – | 0 |
^ – NAIA Division II playoff participant; Rankings from NAIA Division II poll

== Conference champions ==
| Conference | Champion | Record |
|---|---|---|
| Frontier | Montana Tech | 6–0 |
| Heart of America | Baker | 7–0 |
| Hoosier-Buckeye | Findlay; Wilmington (OH) | 6–1 |
| Kansas | Southwestern (KS) | 8–0–1 |
| Nebraska | Doane; Nebraska Wesleyan | 4–1 |
| North Dakota | Valley City State; Minot State | 5–1 |
| Northwest | Pacific Lutheran | 4–1 |
| South Dakota | Black Hills State | 5–0–2 |
| Texas | McMurry (TX); Sul Ross | 4–2 |

== Postseason ==
Quarterfinals; Campus sites
Baker (KS) | 3
Pacific Lutheran* | 35
Westminster (PA) | 28
Findlay* | 0
Wilmington (OH) | 7
William Jewell* | 51
St. Thomas (MN) | 10
Northwestern (IA)* | 17

Semifinals; Campus sites
Pacific Lutheran* | 16
Westminster (PA) | 13
William Jewell* | 12
Northwestern (IA) | 30

Championship; Tacoma, WA
Pacific Lutheran* | 21
Northwestern (IA) | 25

== See also ==
- 1983 NAIA Division I football season
- 1983 NCAA Division I-A football season
- 1983 NCAA Division I-AA football season
- 1983 NCAA Division II football season
- 1983 NCAA Division III football season
