= Larry Korver =

American football coach (born 1936)

Biographical details
- Born: February 27, 1936 (age 90); Orange City, Iowa, U.S.

Playing career

Football
- 1952–1953: Northwestern (IA)
- 1954–1955: South Dakota State

Basketball
- 1955–1956: South Dakota State
- Position: Halfback (football)

Coaching career (HC unless noted)

Football
- c. 1957: Walnut Grove HS (MN)
- 1960–1961: Maurice-Orange City HS (IA) (assistant)
- 1962–1966: Luverne HS (MN)
- 1967–1994: Northwestern (IA)

Head coaching record
- Overall: 212–77–6 (college)
- Tournaments: 15–9 (NAIA D-II playoffs)

Accomplishments and honors

Championships
- 2 NAIA Division II National (1973, 1983); 10 Tri-State (1971–1980); 1 Tri-State Athletic (1988); 1 Nebraska-Iowa (1994)

Awards
- NAIA Coach of the Year (1973); NAIA Division II Coach of the Year (1985); NAIA Hall of Fame (1990)
- College Football Hall of Fame; Inducted in 2025 (profile)

Lawrence "Bubb" Korver (born February 27, 1936) is a retired American football coach. He served as the head coach at Northwestern College in Orange City, Iowa from 1967 to 1994, compiling a record of 212–77–6. Korver led Northwestern to two NAIA Division II Football National Championships, in 1973 and 1983. He was inducted into the NAIA Hall of Fame in 1990. He was inducted into the College Football Hall of Fame in 2025.

A native of Orange City, he attended Northwestern when it was a junior college and then South Dakota State University. He played football at both schools. Korver coached at Walnut Grove High School in Walnut Grove, Minnesota and Maurice-Orange City High School in his hometown. He was the head football coach for five seasons, from 1962 to 1966, at Luverne High School in Luverne, Minnesota, leading his teams to record of 21–20–1.

== Head coaching record ==
=== College ===
Year	Team	Overall	Conference	Standing	Bowl/playoffs
Northwestern Red Raiders (Tri-State Conference) (1968–1980)
1967	Northwestern	0–7–1	0–5–1	7th	
1968	Northwestern	7–2	4–2	3rd	
1969	Northwestern	7–2	4–2	3rd	
1970	Northwestern	6–3	4–2	3rd	
1971	Northwestern	6–3	4–1	1st	
1972	Northwestern	10–1	5–0	1st	L NAIA Division II Championship
1973	Northwestern	12–0	5–0	1st	W NAIA Division II Championship
1974	Northwestern	8–2	5–0	1st	
1975	Northwestern	7–2–1	3–1	T–1st	
1976	Northwestern	5–5	4–0	1st	
1977	Northwestern	6–4	2–0	1st	
1978	Northwestern	9–2	2–0	1st	L NAIA Division II Quarterfinal
1979	Northwestern	10–2	2–0	1st	L NAIA Division II Championship
1980	Northwestern	6–3	2–0	1st	
Northwestern Red Raiders (NAIA Division II independent) (1981–1987)
1981	Northwestern	6–2–1			
1982	Northwestern	12–1			L NAIA Division II Semifinal
1983	Northwestern	14–0			W NAIA Division II Championship
1984	Northwestern	11–2			L NAIA Division II Championship
1985	Northwestern	9–1–1			L NAIA Division II Semifinal
1986	Northwestern	8–2			
1987	Northwestern	3–7			
Northwestern Red Raiders (Tri-State Athletic Conference) (1988–1990)
1988	Northwestern	12–1	3–0	1st	L NAIA Division II Quarterfinal
1989	Northwestern	6–4–1	2–1	2nd	
1990	Northwestern	5–5	2–1	2nd	
Northwestern Red Raiders (NAIA Division II independent) (1991)
1991	Northwestern	4–5			
Northwestern Red Raiders (Nebraska-Iowa Athletic Conference) (1992–1994)
1992	Northwestern	8–2–1	4–1–1	2nd	L NAIA Division II First Round
1993	Northwestern	5–5	2–4	5th	
1994	Northwestern	10–2	6–0	1st	L NAIA Division II Semifinal
Northwestern:		212–77–6	65–20–2		
Total:		212–77–6			
National championship Conference title Conference division title or championship game berth

== See also ==
- List of college football career coaching wins leaders
