= 1968 Westmar Eagles football team =

American college football season

1968 Westmar Eagles football

Tri-State champion
- Conference: Tri-State Conference
- Record: 9–0 (6–0 Tri-State)
- Head coach: Jack Scott (8th season)

1968 Tri-State Conference football standings
	Conf.					Overall
Team	W		L		T	W		L		T
Westmar $	6	–	0	–	0	9	–	0	–	0
Concordia (NE)	5	–	1	–	0	6	–	3	–	0
Northwestern (IA)	4	–	2	–	0	7	–	2	–	0
Dana	2	–	4	–	0	3	–	6	–	0
Sioux Falls	2	–	4	–	0	3	–	6	–	0
Yankton	1	–	4	–	1	1	–	7	–	1
Midland	0	–	5	–	1	0	–	8	–	1
$ – Conference champion

The 1968 Westmar Eagles football team was an American football team that represented Westmar College—later known as Westmar University—as a member of the Tri-State Conference during the 1968 NAIA football season . Led by Jack Scott in his eighth season as head coach, the team compiled a perfect record of 9–0, winning the Tri-State Conference title with a 6–0 mark. It was the fifth straight Tri-State championship for the Eagles and the program's first perfect season since 1911.

== Schedule ==
Date	Time	Opponent	Site	Result	Source
September 14		Buena Vista*	Le Mars, IA	W 34–16	
September 21		North Central (IL)*	Le Mars, IA	W 39–12	
September 28	2:00 p.m.	at Dana	Blair, NE	W 7–3	
October 5		Yankton	Le Mars, IA	W 23–0	
October 12	2:00 p.m.	at Sioux Falls	Howard Wood Stadium; Sioux Falls, SD	W 33–6	
October 19		Northwestern (IA)	Le Mars, IA	W 21–3	
October 26		at Concordia (NE)	Seward, NE	W 7–6	
November 2		Midland	Le Mars, IA	W 28–20	
November 9		at Wartburg*	Waverly, IA	W 23–14	
*Non-conference game; All times are in Central time
