= 1983 Northwestern Red Raiders football team =

American college football season

1983 Northwestern Red Raiders football

NAIA Division II champion

NAIA Division II championship, W 25–21 vs. Pacific Lutheran
- Conference: Independent
- Record: 14–0
- Head coach: Larry Korver (17th season)
- Home stadium: DeValois Field

1983 NAIA Division II independents football records
	Conf.			Overall
Team	W	L	T	W		L		T
No. 1 Northwestern (IA) ^		–		14	–	0	–	0
No. 5 Westminster (PA) ^		–		9	–	2	–	0
No. 12 Loras		–		8	–	2	–	1
No. 16 Iowa Wesleyan		–		7	–	2	–	1
Texas Lutheran		–		7	–	3	–	0
Azusa Pacific		–		6	–	3	–	0
Waynesburg		–		6	–	3	–	1
Benedictine (KS)		–		6	–	4	–	0
Geneva		–		5	–	4	–	0
Peru State		–		4	–	5	–	0
Cal Lutheran		–		4	–	6	–	0
Chadron State		–		4	–	6	–	0
Oklahoma Panhandle State		–		3	–	7	–	0
Westmar		–		2	–	7	–	1
Evangel		–		2	–	8	–	0
^ – NAIA Division II playoff participant; Rankings from NAIA Division II poll

The 1983 Northwestern Red Raiders football team was an American football team that represented Northwestern College of Orange City, Iowa, as an independent during the 1983 NAIA Division II football season. In their 17th year under head coach Larry Korver, the Red Raiders compiled a perfect 14–0 record and won the NAIA Division II Football National Championship with a 25–21 victory over Pacific Lutheran.

The team was led on offense by quarterback Lee McKinstrey.

== Schedule ==
Date	Opponent	Site	Result	Attendance	Source
September 3	at Dakota State	Madison, SD	W 42–0		
September 10	Central (IA)	DeValois Field; Orange City, IA	W 45–27		
September 17	at Buena Vista	Storm Lake, IA	W 41–24		
September 24	Doane	DeValois Field; Orange City, IA	W 26–18		
October 1	at Dana	Blair, NE	W 45–0		
October 8	at Peru State	Peru, NE	W 51–7		
October 15	Westmar	DeValois Field; Orange City, IA	W 45–7	3,000	
October 22	at Bemidji State	Bemidji, MN	W 42–28		
October 29	Chadron State	DeValois Field; Orange City, IA	W 35–13		
November 5	Southwest State (MN)	DeValois Field; Orange City, IA	W 34–30		
November 12	at Midland Lutheran	Fremont, NE	W 53–24		
November 19	St. Thomas (MN)	DeValois Field; Orange City, IA (NAIA Division II quarterfinal)	W 17–10		
December 3	at William Jewell	Greene Stadium; Liberty, MO (NAIA Division II semifinal)	W 30–12		
December 10	at Pacific Lutheran	Tacoma Dome; Tacoma, WA (NAIA Division II championship game)	W 25–21	8,357	
