= Milt Martin =

American football and wrestling coach (1931–2017)

Biographical details
- Born: March 2, 1931; Forbes, North Dakota, U.S.
- Died: May 4, 2017 (aged 86); Le Mars, Iowa, U.S.

Coaching career (HC unless noted)

Football
- 1955–1956: Hazel HS (SD)
- 1957: Morton HS (MN)
- 1958–1961: Sibley HS (IA)
- 1962–1969: Westmar (assistant)
- 1970–1976: Westmar

Wrestling
- 1962–1997: Westmar

Head coaching record
- Overall: 22–37–1 (college football); 462–139 (wrestling)

Milton August Martin (March 2, 1931 – May 4, 2017) was an American football and wrestling coach and college athletics administrator. He served as the head football coach Westmar College—later known as Westmar University—in Le Mars, Iowa from 1970 to 1976, compiling a record of 22–37–1. Martin was also the head wrestling coach at Westmar from 1962 until the school's closing in 1997, leading his teams to a record of 462–139 in dual meets.

Martin was born on March 2, 1931, in Forbes, North Dakota to Henry and Helena (Vossler) Martin. He attended high school in Forbes, graduated from Westmar College in 1953, and earned a master's degree in physical education from Colorado State College—now known as the University of Northern Colorado—in 1958. After serving in the United States Army during the Korean War, Martin began his coaching career as the head football coach at Hazel High School in Hazel, South Dakota, in 1955. He moved to Morton High School in Morton, Minnesota in 1957 for a year and then to Sibley High School in Sibley, Iowa, where was head football coach for four seasons.

Martin died on May 4, 2017, at Good Samaritan Society-Le Mars in Le Mars.

== Head coaching record ==
=== College football ===
Year	Team	Overall	Conference	Standing	Bowl/playoffs
Westmar Eagles (Tri-State Conference) (1970–1976)
1970	Westmar	5–4	3–3	4th	
1971	Westmar	4–4–1	3–2	T–2nd	
1972	Westmar	5–4	4–1	2nd	
1973	Westmar	3–5	2–3	T–3rd	
1974	Westmar	3–5	2–3	T–3rd	
1975	Westmar	2–6	1–3	4th	
1976	Westmar	0–9	0–4	5th	
Westmar:		22–37–1	15–19		
Total:		22–37–1			
