= Jack Scott (American football) =

American football and basketball coach (1928–2014)

Biographical details
- Born: December 20, 1928; Omaha, Nebraska, U.S.
- Died: December 3, 2014 (aged 85); Lubbock, Texas, U.S.

Playing career
- 1947–1950: Graceland
- Position: Running back

Coaching career (HC unless noted)
- 1961–1969: Westmar
- 1970–1977: Eastern New Mexico

Head coaching record
- Overall: 100–58–5 (college football)

Accomplishments and honors

Championships
- 5 Tri-State (1964–1968)

William Jack Scott (December 20, 1928 – December 3, 2014) was an American football and basketball coach. He served as the head football coach at Westmar College—later known as Westmar University—in Le Mars, Iowa from 1961 to 1969 and Eastern New Mexico University in Portales, New Mexico from 1970 to 1977, compiling a career college football coaching record of 100–58–5.

== Coaching career ==
Scott began his coaching career at the high school level at Willow Lake, South Dakota. His high school teams had a two-year 18–1–1 record in football and a 52–30 record in basketball.

=== Westmar ===
From 1961 to 1969 he was head football coach at Westmar College in Le Mars, Iowa where he compiled a 60–17–3 record. His 1968 team was undefeated. He won five consecutive conference championships and remains the winningest football coach in Westmar history. The Iowa United Methodist Foundation maintains a scholarship in his name to this day.

=== Eastern New Mexico ===
Scott was the ninth head football coach for Eastern New Mexico University in Portales, New Mexico and he held that position for eight seasons, from 1970 until 1977. His overall coaching record at Eastern New Mexico was 40–41–2. In 2008, he was one of several honorees awarded "The Distinguished Faculty Emeriti" award by The Friends of Eastern Foundation.

=== Other information ===
Scott attended Dana College. He played professional baseball briefly, in 1950 for the Geneva Red Birds. He died at 85 years old in 2014.

== Head coaching record ==
=== College football ===
Year	Team	Overall	Conference	Standing	Bowl/playoffs
Westmar Eagles (Tri-State Conference) (1961–1969)
1961	Westmar	4–4	4–2	T–2nd	
1962	Westmar	5–4	4–2	T–3rd	
1963	Westmar	6–1–2	4–1–1	3rd	
1964	Westmar	8–1	5–1	1st	
1965	Westmar	7–1–1	5–1	T–1st	
1966	Westmar	7–2	5–1	T–1st	
1967	Westmar	8–1	6–0	1st	
1968	Westmar	9–0	6–0	1st	
1969	Westmar	6–3	3–3	4th	
Westmar:		60–17–3	42–11–1		
Eastern New Mexico Greyhounds (NAIA Division I independent) (1970–1977)
1970	Eastern New Mexico	2–8			
1971	Eastern New Mexico	4–5–1			
1972	Eastern New Mexico	2–8			
1973	Eastern New Mexico	6–4			
1974	Eastern New Mexico	7–4			
1975	Eastern New Mexico	8–3			
1976	Eastern New Mexico	7–3–1			
1977	Eastern New Mexico	4–6			
Eastern New Mexico:		40–41–2			
Total:		100–58–5			
National championship Conference title Conference division title or championship game berth
