= Peter Sørensen Vig =

Danish American pastor, educator and historian

Peter Sørensen Vig (7 November 1854 – 21 March 1929), commonly known as P. S. Vig, was a Danish American pastor, educator, and historian in the Lutheran church. He was integral to the formation of the Danish Evangelical Lutheran Church in North America (the North Church) and the United Danish Evangelical Lutheran Church (United Church).

== Background ==
Peter Sørensen Vig was born in Bøgvad, Egtved Sogn, Vejle Municipality, in South Jutland, Denmark. He attended Askov High School (Danish: Askov Højskole) from 1872 to 1877 and went on to study under the Rev. H. F. Feiberg. He also served as an educator at the Missionary Institute in Copenhagen.

== Ministry ==
Led by Vig and C. X. Hansen, one of the United Church's first priorities was to establish an educational system. Dana College in Blair, Nebraska, was begun as a preparatory school. Vig was the president of Trinity Seminary at Dana College and the president of Dana College from 1897 to 1899. By the early 1910s – in cooperation with the University of Nebraska – Dana College was awarding associate degrees.

== Memorial ==
At the suggestion of United Evangelical Lutheran Church president Dr. N.C. Carlsen, the Pioneer Memorial at Dana College was dedicated to the founders of Dana College. Outside the office of the President of Dana College, is a plaque that reads: "This building is named Pioneer Memorial in memory of A. M. Andersen, Kr. Anker, C. X. Hansen, P. S. Vig, G. B. Christiansen, and many other faithful men and women who contributed to the development and influence of Dana College and Trinity Seminary."

== Historian ==
In addition to his roles as a church leader and educator, Vig was one of the key early chroniclers of the life of Danish immigrants in America. His focus was primarily on the role of the Lutheran church in the lives of Danish-American immigrants, but his work included Danish-Americans from all walks of life.

He published the following works (all in Danish):

- Danske i Amerika ("Danish in America")
- Elk Horn i Iowa ("Elk Horn, Iowa")
- Nordboerne finder vej til Amerika ("The Norse find a way to America")
- Trinitatis Seminarium ("Trinity Seminary"). Blair, NE, 1911. A history of the United Church seminary.
- Den forenede danske Ev. Luth. Kirke i Amerika ("The United Danish Evangelical Lutheran Church in America")
- Den Danske Udvandring til Amerika ("The Danish Immigration to America")
- Dens Aarsager og Veie ("Its Aarsager and Veie")
- Danske i Kamp i og for Amerika ("Danish in Action in and for America"). Omaha, NE: Axel H. Andersen, inc., 1917. A history of Danish soldiers who fought in and for America, covering the years 1640 through 1865.
