= Rubén Mendoza =

Rubén Mendoza may refer to

- Rubén Mendoza Ayala (1961–2016), Mexican politician
- Ruben Mendoza (Ruben Michael Mendoza, 1931–2010), U.S. soccer player
- Ruben Mendoza (American football), a coach and a former guard in the National Football League
- Rubén Mendoza (director) (born 1980), Colombian film director, known for the film Wandering Girl
