= C. X. Hansen =

American educator and historian

Christian Hansen (November 8, 1869 – August 15, 1941), commonly known as C. X. Hansen, was an American educator and historian in the Lutheran church. He was integral to the formation of the Danish Evangelical Lutheran Church in North America (the North Church) and the United Danish Evangelical Lutheran Church (United Church).

C. X. Hansen and Peter Sørensen Vig led the United Church to establish an educational system as a fulfilment of one of its top priorities. Elk Horn Højskole in Elk Horn, Iowa, had been founded in 1878 as the first Danish folk school in America. In 1894, Pastor Kristian Anker, then owner and principal of the Elk Horn Højskole, sold it to the newly formed Danish Evangelical Lutheran Church in North America for use as a seminary and college. Dana College in Blair, Nebraska, was begun as a preparatory school. When the North Church merged with the Blair Church in 1896, the seminary was consolidated with Trinity Seminary in Blair, Nebraska.[1]

== Background and education ==
C. X. Hansen was born on a farm near Lyons, Nebraska where he graduated from Lyons High School. The reason he referred to himself as C. X. Hansen was because there were quite a few men in the area named Chris Hansen. So to distinguish himself from the other Chris Hansens, since he was not given a middle name, he put an 'X' for his middle initial and was always referred to as C. X. Hansen.

In the school year 1886-1887, C. X. was a member of the first student body at Trinity Seminary, Blair, Nebraska. Later on, he entered Midland College, Atchison, Kansas, where he graduated in 1897 with a Bachelor of Arts degree. In 1921, he received the honorary degree Doctor of Humane Letters (L.H.D.) from Augustana College, Rock Island, Illinois and in 1937, C. X. received the honorary degree Doctor of Law (L.L.D.) from Midland College.

== Family ==
C. X. was born November 8, 1869, to Niels Hansen (1838–1912) and Marie Cecilia Christensen (1841–1923) who were Danish immigrants. On December 25, 1898, C.X married Ida Hultberg. Ida Hultberg (September 18, 1872- April 7, 1954) was born to John P. Hultberg (July 4, 1841-Oct 26, 1929) and Hannad Sophia. C.X. and Ida had seven children. Lillian (April 13, 1900-February 1968), Harold (May 18, 1902-November 1991), Paul (March 7, 1904 – August 29, 1971), Elliott (July 3, 1905 – August 26, 1987), Lois (December 11, 1906 – December 19, 1998), Winston (February 21, 1909 – January 16, 1995), Ernest (January 4, 1911-unknown)

== President - Professor ==
In 1894, he joined the faculty of Trinity Seminary as a teacher of secular subjects and, with the exception of the year 1896–1897 (the seminary functioned in Elk Horn that year, and Professor Hansen used this time to complete his work at Midland), he remained most of his life on the faculty. C. X. was the first American-born president of Dana College. He served as president three various times; 1908–1914, 1919–1925, and 1936–1938. By the early 1910s – in cooperation with the University of Nebraska – Dana College was awarding associate degrees.

The accounts which many former students give of his teaching indicate that he was a dedicated and effective teacher who managed to retain the human touch. His concentration allowed him to hold a piece of chalk in each hand and work two separate problems on the blackboard simultaneously. On one occasion, when he was in Omaha and a heavy snow had cut off train service back to Blair, he walked back (a distance of thirty miles) in order not to miss his classes. And to illustrate the human touch and sense of humor which helped endear him to his associates, the incident of the lazy student many well be cited. The student in question had a habit of sleeping late in the mornings and finally C. X. went to his room to remedy the situation. There was no scolding or raging involved. Dr. Hansen simply asked the boy if he were ill. This looked like as good an excuse as any, so the student said yes. Before he realized what had happened, C. X. had given him a large dose of castor oil. It is reported that the cure was effective.

== The Grand Old Man of Dana ==
At the suggestion of United Evangelical Lutheran Church president Dr. N.C. Carlsen, Pioneer Memorial at Dana College was dedicated to the founders of Dana College. Outside the office of the president of Dana College is a plaque that reads: “This building is named Pioneer Memorial in memory of A. M. Andersen, Kr. Anker, C. X. Hansen, P. S. Vig, G. B. Christiansen, and many other faithful men and women who contributed to the development and influence of Dana College and Trinity Seminary.” [5] On August 15, 1941, as head of Department of Education, Dr. C. X. Hansen died suddenly of a heart attack. Probably few if any happenings in Dana's history have carried with them the shock which all those in the college community felt at this, for Dr. Hansen had continued in active teaching and was planning on carrying his usual full load that fall. He had taught for 45 years.
