= KDCV-FM =

Radio station in Blair, Nebraska (1972–2010)

Blair, Nebraska; United States
- Frequency: 91.1 MHz
- Branding: The Jam

Programming
- Format: Defunct (formerly Variety)

Ownership
- Owner: Dana College

History
- First air date: September 11, 1972
- Call sign meaning: Dana College Voice

Technical information
- Facility ID: 15376
- Class: D
- ERP: 6 watts
- HAAT: 27.0 meters
- Transmitter coordinates: 41°33′7″N 96°9′20″W

KDCV-FM (91.1 FM) was a radio station broadcasting a Variety format. Formerly licensed to Blair, Nebraska, United States, the station was owned by Dana College.

== History ==
KDCV-FM began broadcasts on September 11, 1972. In 1992, the station was known as Renegade Radio. The college received a $60,000 grant in 1993 from the Robert H. Storz Foundation to build the Storz Radio Broadcasting Center in a new campus building, with new studios, offices and instructional facilities.

The station shut down in 2010 along with the remainder of Dana College, which experienced declining enrollment and donor support. After being transferred to the college's receiver, KDCV-FM's license was surrendered to the Federal Communications Commission (FCC) by the licensee on February 27, 2013, and the license was then cancelled by the FCC on February 28, 2013.
