= 1973 college football season =

1973 college football season may refer to:

- 1973 NCAA Division I football season
- 1973 NCAA Division II football season
- 1973 NCAA Division III football season
- 1973 NAIA Division I football season
- 1973 NAIA Division II football season
