= 1973 Northwestern Red Raiders football team =

American college football season

1973 Northwestern Red Raiders football

NAIA Division II champion Tri-State champion

NAIA Division II Championship, W 10–3 vs. Glenville State
- Conference: Tri-State Conference
- Record: 12–0 (5–0 Tri-State)
- Head coach: Larry Korver (7th season)
- Home stadium: DeValois Field

1973 Tri-State Conference football standings
	Conf.					Overall
Team	W		L		T	W		L		T
No. 1 Northwestern (IA) $^	5	–	0	–	0	12	–	0	–	0
No. 14 Yankton	4	–	1	–	0	7	–	2	–	0
Sioux Falls	2	–	3	–	0	5	–	5	–	0
Westmar	2	–	3	–	0	3	–	5	–	0
Bethel (MN)	2	–	3	–	0	3	–	6	–	0
Concordia (MN)	0	–	5	–	0	2	–	7	–	0
$ – Conference champion; ^ – NAIA Division II playoff participant; Rankings from NAIA Division II poll

The 1973 Northwestern Red Raiders football team was an American football team that represented Northwestern College of Orange City, Iowa, as a member of the Tri-State Conference during the 1973 NAIA Division II football season. Led by Larry Korver in his seventh season as head coach, the team compiled a perfect record of 12–0, winning the Tri-State Conference title with a 5–0 mark and the NAIA Division II Football National Championship with a 10–3 victory Glenville State in the championship game.

Korver was selected as the 1973 NAIA Football Coach of the Year based on a vote of the NAIA Football Coaches' Association. Defensive tackle Tom Rieck was selected as a first-team player on the All-NAIA All-Star team. Eight Northwestern players received first-team honors on the 1973 all-Tri-State Conference football team: Rieck; quarterback Curt Krull; halfback Mitch Bengard; receivers Dave Hector and Gary Vetter; offensive lineman Jay DeZeeuw; linebacker Doug Van Steenwyk; and defensive back Daryl Hoogeven.

== Schedule ==
Date	Opponent	Site	Result	Attendance	Source
September 1	at South Dakota State*	Coughlin–Alumni Stadium; Brookings, SD	W 38–28		
September 8	at Dakota State*	Madison, SD	W 16–13		
September 15	Central (IA)*	DeValois Field; Orange City, IA	W 22–10		
September 22	at Buena Vista*	Bradford Field; Storm Lake, IA	W 28–15	4,500	
September 29	Yankton	DeValois Field; Orange City, IA	W 21–14		
October 6	Concordia (MN)	DeValois Field; Orange City, IA	W 55–7		
October 13	Westmar	DeValois Field; Orange City, IA	W 50–0		
October 20	at Bethel (MN)	Saint Paul, MN	W 34–7		
October 27	at Sioux Falls	Sioux Falls, SD	W 45–8		
November 3	Southwest Minnesota State*	DeValois Field; Orange City, IA	W 34–14		
November 24	William Jewell*	DeValois Field; Orange City, IA (NAIA Division II Semifinal)	W 28–2	2,957	
December 1	at Glenville State*	Huntington, WV (NAIA Division II Championship)	W 10–3		
*Non-conference game
