= Statue of Joseph Ward =

Joseph Ward
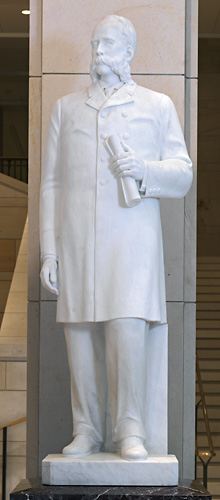
- Artist: Bruno Beghé
- Year: 1963
- Medium: Marble sculpture
- Subject: Joseph Ward
- Location: Washington, D.C., United States

Joseph Ward is a marble sculpture depicting the American educator of the same name by Bruno Beghé, installed United States Capitol Visitor Center's Emancipation Hall, in Washington, D.C., as part of the National Statuary Hall Collection. The statue was donated by the U.S. state of South Dakota in 1963.
