= Agnes Fenenga =

American educator

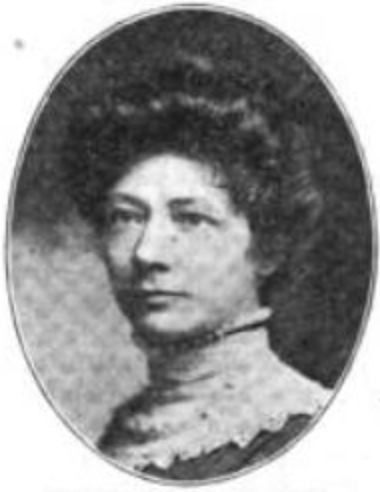
- Agnes Fenenga, from a 1911 publication
- Born: Aukje Fenenga; April 5, 1874; Schiermonnikoog, The Netherlands
- Died: April 4, 1949 (aged 74); Gregory, South Dakota, U.S.
- Occupation(s): Educator, missionary

Agnes E. Fenenga (April 5, 1874 – April 4, 1949) was a Dutch-born American missionary and teacher based in Turkey and Syria for over forty years, from 1901 to 1944.

== Early life and education ==
Aukje Fenenga was born in Schiermonnikoog in Friesland, the Netherlands, one of the ten children of Jacob Oelsen Gerrit Ruurds Fenenga and Lollina Cornelis Visser Fenenga. She moved to the United States with her family in 1881, and settled in South Dakota. Her mother died in 1886. She graduated from Yankton College in 1901.

== Career ==
Fenenga ran a Congregational girls' school at Mardin in Turkey. Her students made lace, which Fenenga sent to the United States to raise funds for the school's work. In 1913, she was arrested and detained for eight months, along with two other missionaries. In 1916, she and other foreign missionaries were forced to leave Mardin. She gave lectures in the United States during World War I, sometimes wearing folk costumes from Eastern Turkey. "She knows all of the awfulness of the war in Turkey by having passed through the most terrible experiences that ever come to a man or woman," explained a Montana newspaper in 1918. "But she is not pessimistic nor bitter."

Fenenga returned to Mardin, and was the city's only American resident during a period of martial law after the Kurdish revolt in 1925. In 1933 she left Mardin and began working in Aleppo. She retired from missionary work in 1944, but continued giving talks about her time in the Middle East until her death five years later.

== Publications ==
- "Letter from Miss Agnes Fenenga" (1902)

== Personal life ==
Fenenga adopted a daughter, Prisca Lois Fenenga, who was born in 1924. Fenenga died in 1949, in Gregory, South Dakota, at the age of 74.
