= Joseph Ward (1838–1889) =

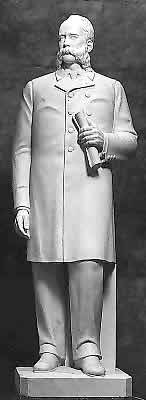

Joseph Ward
(NSHC statue)

Joseph Ward (May 5, 1838 – December 11, 1889) was an American educator.

== Biography ==
Joseph Ward was born at Perry Center, New York. After attending public schools, he taught and worked on a farm before entering Phillips Academy in Andover, Massachusetts. He graduated from Brown University and Andover Theological Seminary. After accepting a missionary appointment, he was ordained and directed church efforts in Yankton, capital of the Dakota Territory in 1869. Because there were no public school funds, Ward opened a private school, which became Yankton Academy. Later given over to public control, it became the earliest high school in Dakota.

He was instrumental in the founding of Yankton College, the first collegiate-rank institution of the upper Missouri River Valley, and served as its president. He also played an important role in keeping school lands out of the control of eastern speculators, and was the first president of the Yankton Board of Education. He also helped establish in 1879 the Dakota Hospital for the Insane.

Ward was a leader in the movement for South Dakota statehood, serving as a delegate to the various conventions and as a member of the 1885 committee to present the petition for statehood to Congress. He drafted much of the constitution and was chairman of the committee charged with keeping the convention records. He composed the state motto ("Under God the People Rule"), and wrote the description for the Great Seal of the State of South Dakota. Bedridden and unable to attend the final constitutional convention in 1889, he died on December 11, 1889, a few weeks after South Dakota was admitted as a state.

In 1963, the State of South Dakota donated a marble statue of Ward to the United States Capitol's National Statuary Hall Collection.
