= Clyde A. Drury =

American college football coach, athletics administrator, and boxer (1906–1987)

Biographical details
- Born: November 27, 1906; Marshalltown, Iowa, U.S.
- Died: January 28, 1987 (aged 80); Des Moines, Iowa, U.S.

Playing career

Football
- 1925: Iowa State Teachers
- Position: End

Coaching career (HC unless noted)

Football
- 1929–1930: Vinton HS (IA)
- 1934–1935: Kimball HS (NE)
- 1936–1938: Western Union
- 1939–1941: Buena Vista

Basketball
- 1929–1931: Vinton HS (IA)
- c. 1932: Trinity School (NY)
- 1934–1936: Kimball HS (NE)
- 1936–1939: Western Union
- 1939–1942: Buena Vista

Baseball
- 1940–1942: Buena Vista

Track and field
- c. 1930: Vinton HS (IA)

Administrative career (AD unless noted)
- 1936–1939: Western Union
- 1939–1942: Buena Vista

Head coaching record
- Overall: 16–28–3 (college football)

Clyde Albert Drury (November 27, 1906 – January 28, 1987) was an American college football coach, athletics administrator, and professional boxer. He served as the head football coach at Western Union College (later known as Westmar University) in Le Mars, Iowa, from 1936 to 1938 and Buena Vista College (now known as Buena Vista University) in Storm Lake, Iowa, from 1939 to 1941.

== Biography ==
Drury was born in Marshalltown, Iowa. He attended Iowa State Teachers College—now known as University of Northern Iowa, where he played football as an end in 1925.

Drury graduated from Iowa State Teachers in June 1929. That summer, he married Madelyn Peterson, in Cedar Rapids, Iowa. In the fall of 1929, he began coaching at in the high school in Vinton, Iowa. Drury then received a master's degree in physical education at Columbia University. While studying at Columbia, he coached the basketball team at Trinity School in Manhattan. Drury later coached football and basketball at Kimball High School in Kimball, Nebraska, for two years, leading his teams to a record of 9–5 in football and 32–2 in basketball. He also coached at his alma mater, Iowa State Teachers, as freshman football coach, assistant coach in football and basketball, and boxing instructor. Drury was hired as athletic director and coach at Western Union in July 1936. He resigned from his post at Western Union in March 1939 to go to Buena Vista. Drury also served as athletic director, basketball coach, and baseball coach at Buena Vista before leaving in 1942, when he volunteered as a physical director for the United States Navy.

Drury lived in Clinton, Iowa, from 1949 onward, retiring in 1975 as a farmer and recreational director. He died of pneumonia, on January 28, 1987, at Veterans Administration Medical Center in Des Moines, Iowa.

== Head coaching record ==
=== College football ===
| Year | Team | Overall | Conference | Standing | Bowl/playoffs |
|---|---|---|---|---|---|
Western Union Eagles (Iowa Conference) (1936–1938)
| 1936 | Western Union | 2–6 | 0–2 | 10th | |
| 1937 | Western Union | 4–4 | 1–2 | 9th | |
| 1938 | Western Union | 5–3 | 1–2 | T–9th | |
| Western Union: | | 11–13 | 2–6 | | |
Buena Vista Beavers (Iowa Conference) (1939–1941)
| 1939 | Buena Vista | 1–5–1 | 0–4–1 | T–12th | |
| 1940 | Buena Vista | 4–3–1 | 2–2 | 6th | |
| 1941 | Buena Vista | 0–7–1 | 0–4–1 | 13th | |
| Buena Vista: | | 5–15–3 | 2–10–2 | | |
| Total: | | 16–28–3 | | | |
