= Kyle Achterhoff =

American football coach

Biographical details
- Education: Northwestern (IA)

Coaching career (HC unless noted)
- 1998–2008: Northwestern (IA) (assistant)
- 2009–2015: Northwestern (IA)

Head coaching record
- Overall: 56–19
- Tournaments: 0–3 (NAIA playoffs)

Accomplishments and honors

Championships
- 1 GPAC (2014)

Kyle Achterhoff is an American former football coach. He served as the head football coach at Northwestern College in Orange City, Iowa from 2009 to 2015, compiling a record of 56–19.

== Head coaching record ==
Year	Team	Overall	Conference	Standing	Bowl/playoffs	NAIA^{#}
Northwestern Red Raiders (Great Plains Athletic Conference) (2009–2015)
2009	Northwestern	7–3	7–3	4th		25
2010	Northwestern	8–2	8–2	3rd		18
2011	Northwestern	9–2	7–2	T–2nd		17
2012	Northwestern	9–3	7–2	2nd	L NAIA First Round	12
2013	Northwestern	8–3	7–2	T–2nd	L NAIA First Round	13
2014	Northwestern	9–2	8–1	T–1st	L NAIA First Round	12
2015	Northwestern	6–4	5–4	T–4th		
Northwestern:		56–19	49–16			
Total:		56–19				
National championship Conference title Conference division title or championship game berth
