= Amanda Clement =

American baseball umpire

- Born: March 20, 1888; Hudson, Dakota Territory (present day South Dakota)
- Died: July 20, 1971 (aged 83); Sioux Falls, South Dakota, U.S.
- Education: University of Nebraska
- Known for: First paid female baseball umpire

Amanda E. Clement (March 20, 1888 – July 20, 1971) was an American baseball umpire who was the first woman paid to referee a game, and may have also been the first woman to referee a high school basketball game. Clement served as an umpire on a regular basis for six years, and served occasionally for several decades afterwards. An accomplished athlete in multiple disciplines, Clement competed in baseball, basketball, track, gymnastics, and tennis, and has been attributed world records in shot put, sprinting, hurdling, and baseball.

== Early life and umpiring career ==
Amanda Clement was born in Hudson, South Dakota, then part of the Dakota Territory, on March 20, 1888, to Harriet Clement (1849–1932), one of the original settlers of Eden, South Dakota, and her husband Phillip (1847–1895), who died when Amanda was very young. In 1904, Clement traveled to Hawarden, Iowa, to watch her brother Hank pitch in a semi-professional game. The umpire for the amateur game taking place before Hank's did not show, and Hank suggested that Amanda, who had played baseball with her brothers and was knowledgeable about the game, serve as the umpire. In so doing, Clement became the first woman paid to umpire a baseball game. Her performance was so well received that she was hired to umpire further semi-professional games. (Note: Sources differ on the year in which Clement umpired her first game. The Schenectady Gazette obituary of Clements places it in 1903, the South Dakota Sports Hall of Fame and the National Baseball Hall of Fame place it in 1904, and Sports Illustrated places it in 1905. Clements would have been either 15, 16, or 17 at the time.)

Now, if women were umpiring, none of this would happen. Do you suppose any ball player in the country would step up to a good-looking girl and say to her: "You color-blind, pickle-brained, cross-eyed idiot, if you don't stop throwing the soup into me, I will distribute your feature all over this ground until the janitor will be compelled to soak you up with gasoline?" Of course, he wouldn't. Ball players aren't a bad lot. In fact, my experience is that they have more than the usual allowance of chivalry. And I don't believe there's anybody in the country that would speak rudely to a woman umpire, even if he thought his drive was 'safe by a mile' instead of a foul.

— Amanda Clement, interview with The Pittsburgh Press, 17 September 1906

Clement's umpiring career lasted six years, during which she officiated games in North Dakota, South Dakota, Minnesota, Iowa, and Nebraska. Unlike in modern games, during Clement's time games only had one umpire, who stood behind the pitcher and was responsible for calling strikes and balls, whether balls were fair or foul, and whether runners reached bases safely. Despite the danger umpires faced during this era Clement was treated respectfully by both players and fans, and became respected for her serious style and because she was insusceptible to bribery. Her popularity was so high that baseball marketers emphasized her officiating of games to bring in crowds. In 1906 Clement wrote an editorial for the Cincinnati Enquirer arguing that women made better umpires than men because men would not speak abusively towards female umpires. She would repeat this idea in interviews with other newspapers. Clement, a Congregationalist, refused to umpire on Sundays and stayed in the homes of clergymen while umpiring on the road.

Clement earned between $15 and $25 per game, which she used to fund her college education, attending Yankton College for two years followed by two years at the University of Nebraska. While at Yankton, she refereed high school basketball games, possibly the first woman to do so, captained the college's women's basketball team, ran track, was a gymnast, and was by her own approximation the state's best tennis player.

A number of additional accomplishments in sports have been attributed to Clement, but cannot be confirmed because of poor record keeping at the time. These claims include winning tennis championships in Iowa and South Dakota and setting world records in shot put, sprinting, hurdling, and baseball, where it is claimed that Clement threw a baseball 275 feet.

== After umpiring ==
Although Clement spent only six years serving as an umpire on a regular basis, she continued to serve intermittently until her forties. Following her time as a regular umpire, Clement spent several years teaching physical education at the University of Wyoming, the Jamestown, North Dakota high school, and other schools in North Dakota and South Dakota. Clement also managed several YWCAs, including one in La Crosse, Wisconsin. Clement also served as the coach of Hudson Independent basketball team, organized tennis tournaments, and served as a newspaper reporter, police matron, typesetter, justice of the peace, and as the city assessor for the town of Hudson. In 1929, Clement moved back to South Dakota to care for her mother, who was ill. Following her mother's death in 1932, Clement moved to Sioux Falls, South Dakota, where she spent twenty-five years as a social worker before retiring in 1966. Clement died in Sioux Falls on July 20, 1971.

== National Baseball Hall of Fame and Museum ==
The National Baseball Hall of Fame and Museum contains artifacts from women associated with baseball, including Clement.
