= Orv Otten =

American football coach

Playing career
- 1975–1978: Northwestern (IA)

Coaching career (HC unless noted)
- 1984–1989: Monmouth (IL) (DC)
- 1990–1994: Northwestern (IA) (DC)
- 1995–2008: Northwestern (IA)
- 2009–2010: Iowa State (QC)
- 2011–2014: Upper Iowa (AHC/DC)

Head coaching record
- Overall: 105–45
- Tournaments: 1–1 (NAIA D-II playoffs); 4–3 (NAIA playoffs)

Accomplishments and honors

Championships
- 2 Nebraska-Iowa/GPAC (1996, 2000)

Orv Otten is an American retired college football coach. He served as the head coach at Northwestern College in Orange City, Iowa from 1995 to 2008, compiling a record of 105–45.

== Head coaching record ==
Year	Team	Overall	Conference	Standing	Bowl/playoffs	NAIA^{#}
Northwestern Red Raiders (Nebraska-Iowa Athletic Conference / Great Plains Athletic Conference) (1995–2008)
1995	Northwestern	7–3	4–2	2nd		
1996	Northwestern	10–2	5–1	1st	L NAIA Division II Quarterfinal	
1997	Northwestern	5–5	3–3	T–3rd		
1998	Northwestern	7–3	3–3	T–3rd		
1999	Northwestern	5–4	3–3	T–3rd		
2000	Northwestern	9–4	6–2	T–1st	L NAIA Semifinal	4
2001	Northwestern	5–5	3–5	T–5th		
2002	Northwestern	6–4	4–4	T–5th		
2003	Northwestern	10–2	9–1	2nd	L NAIA Quarterfinal	7
2004	Northwestern	7–3	7–3	4th		17
2005	Northwestern	8–3	7–3	3rd		17
2006	Northwestern	11–2	9–1	2nd	L NAIA Quarterfinal	6
2007	Northwestern	8–2	8–2	T–2nd		15
2008	Northwestern	7–3	7–3	T–3rd		19
Northwestern:		105–45	78–36			
Total:		105–45				
National championship Conference title Conference division title or championship game berth
