= Rueben Philip Job =

American bishop

Rueben Philip Job (February 7, 1928 – January 3, 2015) was an American bishop of the United Methodist Church. Elected in 1984, he served the Iowa episcopal area and retired in 1992.

== Birth and family ==
Job was born in Jamestown, North Dakota. On August 20, 1953, he married Beverly Nadine Ellerbeck of George, Iowa. They were the parents of four children: Deborah, Ann, Philip, and David, and had seven grandchildren. Job died in Brentwood, Tennessee, a suburb of Nashville.

== Education ==
Job earned the B.A. degree from Westmar College in 1954 (as did his wife, a member of the same class). He earned the Bachelor of Divinity degree from Garrett-Evangelical Theological Seminary in May 1957. Bishop Job holds honorary doctorates from Westmar College (1975), Dakota Wesleyan University (1980), Asbury Theological Seminary (1984), the University of Dubuque Theological School (1989), Rust College (1991), Simpson College (1992), and Iowa Wesleyan College (1992).

== Ordained ministry ==
On May 24, 1952, Job received a License to Preach in the Evangelical United Brethren Church (E.U.B.) from Bishop E. W. Pretorius. Job received a Student Appointment that summer. He was ordained an Elder by Bishop H. R. Heininger in 1957.

Job served several pastorates in North Dakota: Tuttle (1957–1960); Minot (1960–1961); Calvary Church, Fargo (1962–1965). In 1961–1962 he served in Europe as a chaplain in the U.S. Air Force. He served on the staff of the General Board of Evangelism of the E.U.B. Church from 1965 to 1968, and on the general staff of the U.M. Board of Evangelism and Discipleship from 1968 to 1977, following the 1968 merger of the E.U.B. and Methodist Churches that formed the United Methodist Church. In 1977 Job was appointed District Superintendent of the Northern District of the South Dakota Annual Conference. He held this position until he became the World Editor of The Upper Room devotional publication, a highly popular United Methodist ministry. For years he had also been active in the development of spiritual enrichment programs and materials, the author or co-author of numerous works.

== Episcopal ministry ==
The 1984 North Central Jurisdictional Conference of the UMC elected Job a bishop and assigned him to the Iowa Episcopal Area. He served on the UM General Commission on Communications as a bishop. He was also chairperson of the Hymnal Revision Committee of the church, resulting in the 1989 United Methodist Hymnal. Bishop Job retired from the episcopacy in 1992.

== Selected writings ==
- Three Simple Rules: A Wesleyan Way of Living
- Living Fully, Dying Well
- A Journey Toward Solitude and Community
- A Guide to Prayer for Ministers and Other Servants
- A Guide to Prayer for All Who Seek God
- A Wesleyan Spiritual Reader
- Spiritual Life in the Congregation
- A Guide to Prayer for All God's People
- How to Conduct a Spiritual Life Retreat

== See also ==
- Wikipedia List of United Methodist bishops
