= 1973 NAIA Division II football season =

American college football season

- Regular season: August–November 1973
- Postseason: December 1–8, 1973
- National Championship: Huntington, WV
- Champions: Northwestern (IA)

The 1973 NAIA Division II football season was the 18th season of college football sponsored by the NAIA and the fourth season of play of the NAIA's lower division for football.

The season was played from August to November 1973 and culminated in the 1973 NAIA Division II Football National Championship, played on December 8, 1973 in Huntington, West Virginia near the campus of Glenville State College.

The Northwestern Red Raiders defeated the Glenville State Pioneers in the championship game, 10–3, to win their first NAIA national title. As of 2015, this is the earliest NAIA championship won by a team that remains at the NAIA level.

== Conference standings ==
1973 College Conference of Illinois and Wisconsin football standings
	Conf.					Overall
Team	W		L		T	W		L		T
No. 4 Carthage $^	8	–	0	–	0	8	–	2	–	0
No. 12 Millikin	6	–	2	–	0	8	–	2	–	0
No. 15 Augustana (IL)	6	–	2	–	0	7	–	2	–	0
Illinois Wesleyan	5	–	3	–	0	5	–	4	–	0
Carroll (WI)	3	–	5	–	0	4	–	5	–	0
Elmhurst	3	–	5	–	0	4	–	5	–	0
North Park	2	–	6	–	0	3	–	6	–	0
Wheaton (IL)	2	–	6	–	0	2	–	7	–	0
North Central (IL)	1	–	7	–	0	2	–	7	–	0
$ – Conference champion; ^ – NAIA Division II playoff participant; Rankings from NAIA Division II poll

1973 Frontier Conference football standings
	Conf.					Overall
Team	W		L		T	W		L		T
No. 8 Carroll (MT) $	4	–	0	–	0	7	–	0	–	0
Montana Tech	2	–	2	–	0	6	–	2	–	0
Eastern Montana	2	–	2	–	0	3	–	5	–	0
Rocky Mountain	1	–	3	–	0	2	–	6	–	0
Western Montana	1	–	3	–	0	1	–	6	–	0
$ – Conference champion; Rankings from NAIA Division II poll

1973 Gateway Conference football standings
	Conf.					Overall
Team	W		L		T	W		L		T
Northland $	3	–	0	–	0	7	–	2	–	0
Lakeland	2	–	1	–	0	6	–	3	–	0
Milton	1	–	2	–	0	3	–	5	–	0
Northwestern (WI)	0	–	3	–	0	2	–	6	–	0
$ – Conference champion

1973 Great Lakes Intercollegiate Athletic Conference football standings
	Conf.					Overall
Team	W		L		T	W		L		T
Northwood $	2	–	0	–	0	6	–	2	–	0
Ferris State	1	–	1	–	0	4	–	4	–	1
Grand Valley State	0	–	2	–	0	6	–	3	–	0
+ – Conference co-champions

1973 Heart of America Athletic Conference football standings
	Conf.					Overall
Team	W		L		T	W		L		T
No. 3 William Jewell $^	7	–	0	–	0	11	–	1	–	0
No. 5 Missouri Valley	6	–	1	–	0	9	–	1	–	0
Central Methodist	5	–	2	–	0	6	–	3	–	1
Tarkio	4	–	3	–	0	4	–	5	–	0
Graceland	3	–	4	–	0	6	–	4	–	0
College of Emporia	2	–	5	–	0	3	–	7	–	0
Ottawa	1	–	6	–	0	3	–	6	–	0
Baker	0	–	7	–	0	0	–	10	–	0
$ – Conference champion; ^ – NAIA Division II playoff participant; Rankings from NAIA Division II poll

1973 Hoosier–Buckeye Conference football standings
	Conf.					Overall
Team	W		L		T	W		L		T
No. 13 Hanover $	6	–	0	–	0	8	–	1	–	0
No. 19 Defiance	5	–	2	–	0	7	–	2	–	0
Taylor	4	–	2	–	1	4	–	4	–	1
Bluffton	4	–	3	–	0	4	–	5	–	0
Wilmington (OH)	4	–	3	–	0	5	–	3	–	0
Earlham	3	–	4	–	0	4	–	6	–	0
Anderson (IN)	2	–	5	–	0	3	–	6	–	0
Findlay	1	–	6	–	0	3	–	7	–	0
Manchester (IN)	0	–	6	–	1	1	–	7	–	1
$ – Conference champion; Rankings from NAIA Division II poll

1973 Iowa Conference football standings
	Conf.					Overall
Team	W		L		T	W		L		T
No. 9 Buena Vista $	7	–	0	–	0	8	–	1	–	0
Central (IA)	6	–	1	–	0	7	–	2	–	0
Wartburg	4	–	3	–	0	5	–	4	–	0
Dubuque	3	–	3	–	1	5	–	4	–	1
William Penn	3	–	4	–	0	6	–	4	–	0
Luther	2	–	4	–	1	2	–	6	–	1
Simpson (IA)	1	–	5	–	1	2	–	6	–	1
Upper Iowa	0	–	6	–	1	1	–	7	–	1
$ – Conference champion; Rankings from NAIA Division II poll

1973 Minnesota Intercollegiate Athletic Conference football standings
	Conf.					Overall
Team	W		L		T	W		L		T
No. 11 St. Thomas (MN) +	6	–	1	–	0	9	–	1	–	0
No. 9 Minnesota–Duluth +	6	–	1	–	0	8	–	1	–	0
Augsburg	5	–	2	–	0	7	–	2	–	0
Gustavus Adolphus	4	–	3	–	0	5	–	5	–	0
Concordia–Moorhead	3	–	4	–	0	5	–	5	–	0
Saint John's (MN)	3	–	4	–	0	4	–	4	–	0
Hamline	1	–	6	–	0	3	–	6	–	0
Macalester	0	–	7	–	0	1	–	9	–	0
+ – Conference co-champions; Rankings from NAIA Division I poll

1973 Kansas Collegiate Athletic Conference football standings
	Conf.					Overall
Team	W		L		T	W		L		T
St. Mary of the Plains +	7	–	1	–	0	7	–	3	–	0
Bethany (KS) +	7	–	1	–	0	7	–	4	–	0
Sterling	5	–	3	–	0	6	–	3	–	0
Friends	5	–	3	–	0	5	–	4	–	0
Tabor	4	–	4	–	0	4	–	5	–	0
Bethel (KS)	3	–	5	–	0	3	–	6	–	0
McPherson	2	–	6	–	0	2	–	8	–	0
Southwestern (KS)	2	–	6	–	0	2	–	7	–	0
Kansas Wesleyan	1	–	7	–	0	2	–	8	–	0
+ – Conference co-champions

1973 Nebraska Intercollegiate Athletic Conference football standings
	Conf.					Overall
Team	W		L		T	W		L		T
No. 20 Doane $	4	–	0	–	1	7	–	2	–	1
Nebraska Wesleyan	3	–	1	–	1	4	–	3	–	1
Hastings	3	–	2	–	0	5	–	4	–	0
Midland	3	–	2	–	0	5	–	5	–	0
Concordia (NE)	1	–	4	–	0	4	–	6	–	0
Dana	0	–	5	–	0	0	–	8	–	0
$ – Conference champion; Rankings from NAIA Division II poll

1973 North Dakota College Athletic Conference football standings
	Conf.					Overall
Team	W		L		T	W		L		T
Minot State $	5	–	0	–	0	6	–	3	–	0
Valley City State	4	–	1	–	0	6	–	3	–	0
Dickinson State	3	–	2	–	0	5	–	3	–	1
Jamestown	2	–	3	–	0	5	–	4	–	1
Mayville State	1	–	4	–	0	2	–	6	–	0
Wahpeton Science	0	–	5	–	0	1	–	5	–	0
$ – Conference champion

1973 Northwest Conference football standings
	Conf.					Overall
Team	W		L		T	W		L		T
Pacific Lutheran $	6	–	1	–	0	6	–	3	–	0
No. 11 Linfield	5	–	2	–	0	7	–	2	–	0
Whitworth	4	–	2	–	0	4	–	5	–	0
Willamette	4	–	3	–	0	5	–	4	–	0
Whitman	3	–	4	–	0	3	–	5	–	1
Lewis & Clark	3	–	4	–	0	3	–	6	–	0
College of Idaho	2	–	4	–	0	2	–	7	–	0
Pacific (OR)	0	–	7	–	0	0	–	9	–	0
$ – Conference champion; Rankings from NAIA Division II poll

1973 South Dakota Intercollegiate Conference football standings
	Conf.					Overall
Team	W		L		T	W		L		T
No. 17 Dakota State $	5	–	0	–	0	6	–	3	–	0
South Dakota Tech	3	–	1	–	1	4	–	3	–	2
Black Hills State	3	–	2	–	0	4	–	5	–	1
Huron	2	–	2	–	1	?	–	?	–	?
Dakota Wesleyan	1	–	4	–	0	1	–	8	–	0
South Dakota–Springfield	0	–	5	–	0	?	–	?	–	?
$ – Conference champion; Rankings from NAIA Division II poll

1973 Southern California Intercollegiate Athletic Conference football standings
	Conf.					Overall
Team	W		L		T	W		L		T
No. 10 Redlands $	5	–	0	–	0	8	–	1	–	0
Whittier	3	–	2	–	0	6	–	3	–	0
La Verne	3	–	2	–	0	4	–	5	–	0
Claremont-Mudd	2	–	3	–	0	3	–	5	–	0
Occidental	2	–	3	–	0	2	–	6	–	0
Pomona-Pitzer	0	–	5	–	0	1	–	7	–	1
$ – Conference champion; Rankings from NAIA Division II poll

1973 Southern Intercollegiate Athletic Conference football standings
	Conf.					Overall
Team	W		L		T	W		L		T
Division I
Bethune–Cookman x	5	–	0	–	0	9	–	2	–	0
Florida A&M	4	–	1	–	0	5	–	6	–	0
No. 16 Albany State	3	–	2	–	0	6	–	3	–	1
Alabama A&M	3	–	2	–	0	5	–	5	–	0
Tuskegee	2	–	3	–	0	7	–	4	–	0
Morris Brown	1	–	4	–	0	1	–	8	–	1
Alabama State	0	–	5	–	0	3	–	8	–	0
Division II
No. 7 Fisk x	5	–	0	–	0	9	–	0	–	0
Fort Valley State	4	–	1	–	0	7	–	1	–	1
Clark (GA)	4	–	1	–	0	4	–	3	–	1
Morehouse	3	–	2	–	0	4	–	3	–	1
Savannah State	2	–	3	–	0	3	–	6	–	0
Lane	1	–	4	–	0	3	–	6	–	0
Miles	1	–	4	–	0	1	–	8	–	0
Knoxville	0	–	5	–	0	0	–	8	–	0
x – Division champion/co-champions; Rankings from NAIA Division II poll

1973 Tri-State Conference football standings
	Conf.					Overall
Team	W		L		T	W		L		T
No. 1 Northwestern (IA) $^	5	–	0	–	0	12	–	0	–	0
No. 14 Yankton	4	–	1	–	0	7	–	2	–	0
Sioux Falls	2	–	3	–	0	5	–	5	–	0
Westmar	2	–	3	–	0	3	–	5	–	0
Bethel (MN)	2	–	3	–	0	3	–	6	–	0
Concordia (MN)	0	–	5	–	0	2	–	7	–	0
$ – Conference champion; ^ – NAIA Division II playoff participant; Rankings from NAIA Division II poll

1973 West Virginia Intercollegiate Athletic Conference football standings
	Conf.					Overall
Team	W		L		T	W		L		T
Northern Division
Fairmont State xy$	3	–	0	–	0	6	–	3	–	1
West Liberty State	2	–	1	–	1	3	–	5	–	1
Salem	2	–	2	–	0	6	–	4	–	0
Shepherd	1	–	2	–	0	6	–	4	–	0
West Virginia Wesleyan	0	–	3	–	1	2	–	6	–	1
Southern Division
No. 2 Glenville State xy^	4	–	0	–	0	10	–	2	–	0
Bluefield State	3	–	1	–	0	4	–	5	–	0
West Virginia State	2	–	2	–	0	5	–	5	–	0
West Virginia Tech	1	–	3	–	0	4	–	5	–	0
Concord	0	–	4	–	0	0	–	9	–	0
Championship: Fairmont State 21, Glenville State 7
$ – Conference champion; x – Division champion/co-champions; y – Championship game participant; ^ – NAIA Division II playoff participant Conference standings based on power ratings; Rankings from NAIA Division II poll

1973 NAIA Division II independents football records
	Conf.			Overall
Team	W	L	T	W		L		T
No. 6 Westminster (PA)		–		7	–	1	–	0
No. 18 Simon Fraser		–		6	–	2	–	0
Texas Lutheran		–		7	–	3	–	0
Cal Lutheran		–		6	–	4	–	0
Azusa Pacific		–		5	–	4	–	0
Franklin (IN)		–		5	–	4	–	0
Missouri Western		–		4	–	5	–	1
Geneva		–		4	–	5	–	0
Missouri Southern		–		4	–	6	–	0
Austin		–		3	–	5	–	1
Iowa Wesleyan		–		3	–	5	–	0
Waynesburg		–		3	–	5	–	0
Benedictine (KS)		–		3	–	6	–	0
Eureka		–		3	–	6	–	0
Georgetown (KY)		–		3	–	6	–	0
Oklahoma Panhandle State		–		3	–	7	–	1
Rankings from NAIA Division II poll

== Postseason ==
Semifinals; December 1, 1973
William Jewell	2
Northwestern (IA)*	28
Carthage	7
Glenville State*	14

Championship; December 8, 1973; Huntington, WV
Northwestern (IA)	10
Glenville State*	3

== See also ==
- 1973 NAIA Division I football season
- 1973 NCAA Division I football season
- 1973 NCAA Division II football season
- 1973 NCAA Division III football season
