= Northwestern Red Raiders football =

College football team

| 2024 Northwestern Red Raiders football team |
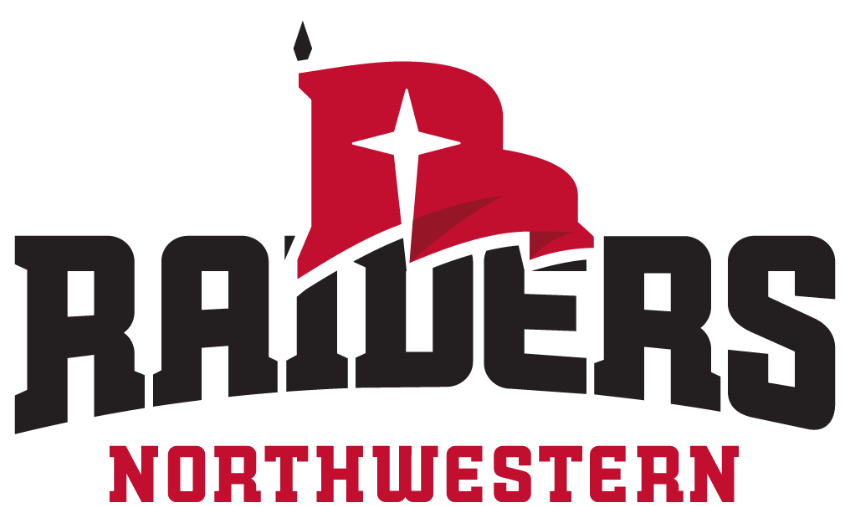
- First season: 1950; 76 years ago
- Athletic director: Tony Hoops
- Head coach: Matt McCarty; 10th season, 96–26 (.787)
- Location: Orange City, Iowa
- Stadium: De Valois Stadium (capacity: 3,100)
- Field: Korver Field
- Conference: GPAC
- Colors: Red and white
- All-time record: 486–203–7 (.703)

NAIA national championships
- NAIA: 2022 NAIA Division II: 1973, 1983

Conference championships
- Tri-State: 1971, 1972, 1973, 1974, 1975, 1976, 1977, 1978, 1979, 1980 Tri-State Athletic: 1988 Nebraska-Iowa / GPAC: 1994, 1996, 2000, 2014, 2022, 2023
- Heisman winners: NAIA: 1 (2020)
- Rivalries: Dordt University
- Mascot: Red Raiders
- Website: nwcraiders.com

The Northwestern Red Raiders football team represents Northwestern College in college football in the National Association of Intercollegiate Athletics (NAIA). The Red Raiders are members of the Great Plains Athletic Conference (GPAC), fielding its team in the GPAC since 1992 when it was known as the Nebraska–Iowa Athletic Conference (NIAC). The Red Raiders play their home games at Korver Field at De Valois Stadium in Orange City, Iowa.

The school's head coach is Matt McCarty, who took over the position for the 2016 season.

== Conference affiliations ==
- Two-year college (1950–1954)
- Tri-State Conference (1960–1980)
- NAIA Division II independent (1981–1987, 1991)
- Tri-State Athletic Conference (1988–1990)
- Nebraska–Iowa Athletic Conference / Great Plains Athletic Conference (1992–present)

== List of head coaches ==
=== Key ===
Key to symbols in coaches list
| General | | Overall | | Conference | | Postseason (Note: Although the first Rose Bowl Game was played in 1902, it has been continuously played since the 1916 game, and is recognized as the oldest bowl game by the NCAA. "—" indicates any season prior to 1916 when postseason games were not played.) | |
|---|---|---|---|---|---|---|---|
| No. | Order of coaches (Note: A running total of the number of head coaches, with coaches who served separate tenures being counted only once. Interim head coaches are represented with "Int" and are not counted in the running total. "—" indicates the team played but either without a coach or no coach is on record. "X" indicates an interim year without play.) | GC | Games coached | CW | Conference wins | PW | Postseason wins |
| DC | Division championships | OW | Overall wins | CL | Conference losses | PL | Postseason losses |
| CC | Conference championships | OL | Overall losses | CT | Conference ties | PT | Postseason ties |
| NC | National championships | OT | Overall ties (Note: Overtime rules in college football were introduced in 1996, making ties impossible in the period since.) | C% | Conference winning percentage | | |
| † | Elected to the College Football Hall of Fame | O% | Overall winning percentage (Note: When computing the win–loss percentage, a tie counts as half a win and half a loss.) | | | | |

=== Coaches ===
List of head football coaches showing season(s) coached, overall records and conference records
| No. | Name | Season(s) | GC | OW | OL | OT | O% | CW | CL | CT | C% |
|---|---|---|---|---|---|---|---|---|---|---|---|
| 1 | Jim Welton | 1960–1966 | 54 | 17 | 36 | 1 | 0.324 | 12 | 30 | 0 | 0.286 |
| 2 | Larry Korver | 1967–1994 | 295 | 212 | 77 | 6 | 0.729 | 65 | 20 | 2 | 0.759 |
| 3 | Orv Otten | 1995–2008 | 150 | 105 | 45 | 0 | 0.700 | 78 | 36 | 0 | 0.684 |
| 4 | Kyle Achterhoff | 2009–2015 | 75 | 56 | 19 | 0 | 0.747 | 49 | 16 | 0 | 0.754 |
| 5 | Matt McCarty | 2016–present | 122 | 96 | 26 | 0 | 0.787 | 76 | 17 | 0 | 0.817 |

== Year-by-year results ==
| National champions | Conference champions | Bowl game berth | Playoff berth |

| Season | Year | Head coach | Association | Division | Conference | Record | | | | | | | Postseason | Final ranking |
| Season | Year | Head coach | Association | Division | Conference | Overall | | | Conference | | | | Postseason | Final ranking |
| Season | Year | Head coach | Association | Division | Conference | Win | Loss | Tie | Finish | Win | Loss | Tie | Postseason | Final ranking |
|---|---|---|---|---|---|---|---|---|---|---|---|---|---|---|
| 1950 | 1950 | Two year college (does not reflect in overall record) | | | | 3 | 3 | 1 | | | | | — | — |
| 1951 | 1951 | Two year college (does not reflect in overall record) | | | | 4 | 2 | 1 | | | | | — | — |
| 1952 | 1952 | Two year college (does not reflect in overall record) | | | | 2 | 4 | 1 | | | | | — | — |
| 1953 | 1953 | Two year college (does not reflect in overall record) | | | | 8 | 0 | 0 | | | | | — | — |
| 1954 | 1954 | Two year college (does not reflect in overall record) | | | | 7 | 1 | 0 | | | | | — | — |
| 1960 | 1960 | Joe Welton | NAIA | — | Tri-State | 0 | 6 | 0 | 7th | 0 | 6 | 0 | — | — |
| 1961 | 1961 | Joe Welton | NAIA | — | Tri-State | 3 | 4 | 1 | 4th | 3 | 3 | 0 | — | — |
| 1962 | 1962 | Joe Welton | NAIA | — | Tri-State | 0 | 8 | 0 | 7th | 0 | 6 | 0 | — | — |
| 1963 | 1963 | Joe Welton | NAIA | — | Tri-State | 4 | 4 | 0 | 4th | 3 | 3 | 0 | — | — |
| 1964 | 1964 | Joe Welton | NAIA | — | Tri-State | 6 | 2 | 0 | T–2nd | 4 | 2 | 0 | — | — |
| 1965 | 1965 | Joe Welton | NAIA | — | Tri-State | 2 | 6 | 0 | T–6th | 1 | 5 | 0 | — | — |
| 1966 | 1966 | Joe Welton | NAIA | — | Tri-State | 2 | 6 | 0 | 7th | 1 | 5 | 0 | — | — |
| 1967 | 1967 | Larry Korver | NAIA | — | Tri-State | 0 | 7 | 1 | 7th | 0 | 5 | 1 | — | — |
| 1968 | 1968 | Larry Korver | NAIA | — | Tri-State | 7 | 2 | 0 | 3rd | 4 | 2 | 0 | — | — |
| 1969 | 1969 | Larry Korver | NAIA | — | Tri-State | 7 | 2 | 0 | 3rd | 4 | 2 | 0 | — | — |
| 1970 | 1970 | Larry Korver | NAIA | Division II | Tri-State | 6 | 3 | 0 | 3rd | 4 | 2 | 0 | — | — |
| 1971 | 1971 | Larry Korver | NAIA | Division II | Tri-State | 6 | 3 | 0 | 1st | 4 | 1 | 0 | Conference champions | — |
| 1972 | 1972 | Larry Korver | NAIA | Division II | Tri-State | 10 | 1 | 0 | 1st | 5 | 0 | 0 | L NAIA Division II Championship | — |
| 1973 | 1973 | Larry Korver | NAIA | Division II | Tri-State | 12 | 0 | 0 | 1st | 5 | 0 | 0 | W NAIA Division II Championship | — |
| 1974 | 1974 | Larry Korver | NAIA | Division II | Tri-State | 8 | 2 | 0 | 1st | 5 | 0 | 0 | Conference champions | — |
| 1975 | 1975 | Larry Korver | NAIA | Division II | Tri-State | 7 | 2 | 1 | T–1st | 3 | 1 | 0 | Conference co-champions | — |
| 1976 | 1976 | Larry Korver | NAIA | Division II | Tri-State | 5 | 5 | 0 | 1st | 4 | 0 | 0 | Conference champions | — |
| 1977 | 1977 | Larry Korver | NAIA | Division II | Tri-State | 6 | 4 | 0 | 1st | 2 | 0 | 0 | Conference champions | — |
| 1978 | 1978 | Larry Korver | NAIA | Division II | Tri-State | 9 | 2 | 0 | 1st | 2 | 0 | 0 | L NAIA Division II Quarterfinal | — |
| 1979 | 1979 | Larry Korver | NAIA | Division II | Tri-State | 10 | 2 | 0 | 1st | 2 | 0 | 0 | L NAIA Division II Championship | — |
| 1980 | 1980 | Larry Korver | NAIA | Division II | Tri-State | 6 | 3 | 0 | 1st | 2 | 0 | 0 | Conference champions | — |
| 1981 | 1981 | Larry Korver | NAIA | Division II | Independent | 6 | 2 | 1 | | | | | — | — |
| 1982 | 1982 | Larry Korver | NAIA | Division II | Independent | 12 | 1 | 0 | | | | | L NAIA Division II Semifinal | — |
| 1983 | 1983 | Larry Korver | NAIA | Division II | Independent | 14 | 0 | 0 | | | | | W NAIA Division II Championship | — |
| 1984 | 1984 | Larry Korver | NAIA | Division II | Independent | 11 | 2 | 0 | | | | | L NAIA Division II Championship | — |
| 1985 | 1985 | Larry Korver | NAIA | Division II | Independent | 9 | 1 | 1 | | | | | L NAIA Division II Semifinal | — |
| 1986 | 1986 | Larry Korver | NAIA | Division II | Independent | 8 | 2 | 0 | | | | | — | — |
| 1987 | 1987 | Larry Korver | NAIA | Division II | Independent | 3 | 7 | 0 | | | | | — | — |
| 1988 | 1988 | Larry Korver | NAIA | Division II | Tri-State Athletic | 12 | 1 | 0 | 1st | 4 | 0 | 0 | L NAIA Division II Quarterfinal | — |
| 1989 | 1989 | Larry Korver | NAIA | Division II | Tri-State Athletic | 6 | 4 | 1 | 2nd | 2 | 1 | 0 | — | — |
| 1990 | 1990 | Larry Korver | NAIA | Division II | Tri-State Athletic | 5 | 5 | 0 | 2nd | 2 | 1 | 0 | — | — |
| 1991 | 1991 | Larry Korver | NAIA | Division II | Independent | 4 | 5 | 0 | | | | | — | — |
| 1992 | 1992 | Larry Korver | NAIA | Division II | NIAC | 8 | 2 | 1 | 2nd | 4 | 1 | 1 | L NAIA Division II First Round | — |
| 1993 | 1993 | Larry Korver | NAIA | Division II | NIAC | 5 | 5 | 0 | 5th | 2 | 4 | 0 | — | — |
| 1994 | 1994 | Larry Korver | NAIA | Division II | NIAC | 10 | 2 | 0 | 1st | 6 | 0 | 0 | L NAIA Division II Semifinal | — |
| 1995 | 1995 | Orv Otten | NAIA | Division II | NIAC | 7 | 3 | 0 | 2nd | 4 | 2 | 0 | — | — |
| 1996 | 1996 | Orv Otten | NAIA | Division II | NIAC | 10 | 2 | 0 | 1st | 5 | 1 | 0 | L NAIA Division II Quarterfinal | — |
| 1997 | 1997 | Orv Otten | NAIA | — | NIAC | 5 | 5 | 0 | T–3rd | 3 | 3 | 0 | — | — |
| 1998 | 1998 | Orv Otten | NAIA | — | NIAC | 7 | 3 | 0 | T–3rd | 3 | 3 | 0 | — | — |
| 1999 | 1999 | Orv Otten | NAIA | — | NIAC | 5 | 4 | 0 | T–3rd | 3 | 3 | 0 | — | — |
| 2000 | 2000 | Orv Otten | NAIA | — | GPAC | 9 | 4 | 0 | T–1st | 6 | 2 | 0 | L NAIA Semifinal | 4 |
| 2001 | 2001 | Orv Otten | NAIA | — | GPAC | 5 | 5 | 0 | T–5th | 3 | 5 | 0 | — | — |
| 2002 | 2002 | Orv Otten | NAIA | — | GPAC | 6 | 4 | 0 | T–5th | 4 | 4 | 0 | — | — |
| 2003 | 2003 | Orv Otten | NAIA | — | GPAC | 10 | 2 | 0 | 2nd | 9 | 1 | 0 | L NAIA Quarterfinal | 7 |
| 2004 | 2004 | Orv Otten | NAIA | — | GPAC | 7 | 3 | 0 | 4th | 7 | 3 | 0 | — | 17 |
| 2005 | 2005 | Orv Otten | NAIA | — | GPAC | 8 | 3 | 0 | 3rd | 7 | 3 | 0 | — | 17 |
| 2006 | 2006 | Orv Otten | NAIA | — | GPAC | 11 | 2 | 0 | 2nd | 9 | 1 | 0 | L NAIA Quarterfinal | 6 |
| 2007 | 2007 | Orv Otten | NAIA | — | GPAC | 8 | 2 | 0 | T–2nd | 8 | 2 | 0 | — | 15 |
| 2008 | 2008 | Orv Otten | NAIA | — | GPAC | 7 | 3 | 0 | T–3rd | 7 | 3 | 0 | — | 19 |
| 2009 | 2009 | Kyle Achterhoff | NAIA | — | GPAC | 7 | 3 | 0 | 4th | 7 | 3 | 0 | — | 25 |
| 2010 | 2010 | Kyle Achterhoff | NAIA | — | GPAC | 8 | 2 | 0 | 3rd | 8 | 2 | 0 | — | 18 |
| 2011 | 2011 | Kyle Achterhoff | NAIA | — | GPAC | 9 | 2 | 0 | T–2nd | 7 | 2 | 0 | — | 17 |
| 2012 | 2012 | Kyle Achterhoff | NAIA | — | GPAC | 9 | 3 | 0 | 2nd | 7 | 2 | 0 | L NAIA First Round | 12 |
| 2013 | 2013 | Kyle Achterhoff | NAIA | — | GPAC | 8 | 3 | 0 | T–2nd | 7 | 2 | 0 | L NAIA First Round | 13 |
| 2014 | 2014 | Kyle Achterhoff | NAIA | — | GPAC | 9 | 2 | 0 | T–1st | 8 | 1 | 0 | L NAIA First Round | 12 |
| 2015 | 2015 | Kyle Achterhoff | NAIA | — | GPAC | 6 | 4 | 0 | T–4th | 5 | 4 | 0 | — | — |
| 2016 | 2016 | Matt McCarty | NAIA | — | GPAC | 3 | 7 | 0 | 6th | 3 | 5 | 0 | — | — |
| 2017 | 2017 | Matt McCarty | NAIA | — | GPAC | 10 | 2 | 0 | 2nd | 7 | 1 | 0 | L NAIA Quarterfinal | 8 |
| 2018 | 2018 | Matt McCarty | NAIA | — | GPAC | 9 | 2 | 0 | 2nd | 8 | 1 | 0 | L NAIA First Round | 12 |
| 2019 | 2019 | Matt McCarty | NAIA | — | GPAC | 9 | 2 | 0 | 2nd | 8 | 1 | 0 | L NAIA First Round | 10 |
| 2020 | 2020 | Matt McCarty | NAIA | — | GPAC | 11 | 2 | 0 | 2nd | 8 | 1 | 0 | L NAIA Championship | 2 |
| 2021 | 2021 | Matt McCarty | NAIA | — | GPAC | 12 | 2 | 0 | 2nd | 9 | 1 | 0 | L NAIA Semifinal | 4 |
| 2022 | 2022 | Matt McCarty | NAIA | — | GPAC | 13 | 1 | 0 | T–1st | 9 | 1 | 0 | W NAIA Championship | 1 |
| 2023 | 2023 | Matt McCarty | NAIA | — | GPAC | 14 | 1 | 0 | 1st | 10 | 0 | 0 | L NAIA Championship | 1 |
| 2024 | 2024 | Matt McCarty | NAIA | — | GPAC | 9 | 3 | 0 | T–2nd | 8 | 2 | 0 | L NAIA Quarterfinal | 10 |
| 2025 | 2025 | Matt McCarty | NAIA | — | GPAC | 6 | 4 | 0 | T–4th | 6 | 4 | 0 | — | — |
