= Graduate placement =

The term graduate placement is a statistic used by colleges, universities, and other schools to statistically report the successfulness of their graduated students to find a job in the student's chosen field of study.

It is generally used to indicate the efficacy of the teaching methods and educational opportunities for prospective students looking for a good school to spend their tuition money.
