= Ruben Mendoza (American football) =

American football player and coach (born 1963)

No. 62
- Position: Guard

Personal information
- Born: May 10, 1963 (age 63); Crystal City, Texas, U.S.
- Listed height: 6 ft 4 in (1.93 m)
- Listed weight: 290 lb (132 kg)

Career information
- College: Wayne State
- NFL draft: 1986: undrafted

Career history
- Green Bay Packers (1986)
- Stats at Pro Football Reference

Ruben Mendoza (born May 10, 1963) is a strength and conditioning coach and a former guard in the National Football League (NFL).

== Biography ==
Mendoza was born Ruben Edward Mendoza on May 10, 1963 in Crystal City, Texas. He is married with five children.

== Playing career ==
Mendoza played at the collegiate level at Wayne State College and the now-defunct Yankton College. He played with the Green Bay Packers during the 1986 NFL season.

== Coaching career ==
Mendoza's first coaching experience was as a graduate assistant at the University of South Carolina. Following his time there he spent a season at Presbyterian College, where he was an assistant strength coach and also coached the defensive line on the school's football team. Four years as the Coordinator of Strength and Conditioning at the University of Tennessee Chattanooga before moving to Clemson University to serve as Assistant Director of Strength and Conditioning. Mendoza later spent four years as Director of Strength and Conditioning at the University of Mississippi before being named Strength and Conditioning Coordinator at the University of Notre Dame. He is now the head strength and conditioning coach at Wayne State University in Detroit.
