= Tri-State Conference (1960–1981) =

American collegiate athletics conference

- Founded: 1960
- Folded: 1981
- No. of teams: 7
- Region: Midwest

The Tri-State Conference was an intercollegiate athletic conference associated with National Association of Intercollegiate Athletics (NAIA) the that existed from 1960 to 1981 and one of two conferences to share this name. The league had members in the Midwestern states of Iowa, Nebraska, South Dakota, and Minnesota.

The Tri-State Conference began operations in 1960 with seven members: Concordia College (now known as Concordia University Nebraska) in Seward, Nebraska, Dana College (closed in 2010) in Blair, Nebraska, Midland College (now known as Midland University) in Fremont, Nebraska, Northwestern College in Orange City, Iowa, Sioux Falls College (now known as the University of Sioux Falls) in Sioux Falls, South Dakota, Westmar University (closed in 1997) in Le Mars, Iowa, and Yankton College (closed in 1984) in Yankton, South Dakota. In 1971, the three Nebraska schools (Concordia, Dana, and Midland) withdrew; they joined the Nebraska Intercollegiate Athletic Conference (now known as the Great Plains Athletic Conference) in 1969 and had been members of both conferences. The same year, 1971, Bethel College (now known as Bethel University) in Arden Hills, Minnesota and Concordia University in Saint Paul, Minnesota joined the Tri-State Conference. Concordia of St. Paul left in 1975 as did Bethel in 1977. Dordt College (now known as Dordt University) joined in 1976. Sioux Falls left in 1977 to join the South Dakota Intercollegiate Conference.

== Football champions ==
- 1960 – Concordia (NE)
- 1961 – Midland
- 1962 – Concordia (NE) and Dana
- 1963 – Midland
- 1964 – Westmar
- 1965 – Midland and Westmar
- 1966 – Westmar and Yankton
- 1967 – Westmar
- 1968 – Westmar
- 1969 – Yankton
- 1970 – Yankton
- 1971 – Northwestern (IA)
- 1972 – Northwestern (IA)
- 1973 – Northwestern (IA)
- 1974 – Northwestern (IA)
- 1975 – Bethel (MN), Northwestern (IA), and Yankton
- 1976 – Northwestern (IA)
- 1977 – Northwestern (IA)
- 1978 – Northwestern (IA)
- 1979 – Northwestern (IA)
- 1980 – Northwestern (IA)

== Yearly football standings ==
1960 Tri-State Conference football standings
	Conf.					Overall
Team	W		L		T	W		L		T
Concordia (NE) $	5	–	0	–	1	7	–	1	–	1
Midland	5	–	1	–	0	7	–	1	–	0
Sioux Falls	4	–	2	–	0	6	–	2	–	0
Westmar	3	–	2	–	1	3	–	4	–	1
Dana	2	–	4	–	0	2	–	6	–	0
Yankton	1	–	5	–	0	1	–	7	–	0
Northwestern (IA)	0	–	6	–	0	0	–	6	–	0
$ – Conference champion

1961 Tri-State Conference football standings
	Conf.					Overall
Team	W		L		T	W		L		T
Midland $	5	–	1	–	0	6	–	2	–	0
Dana	4	–	2	–	0	5	–	3	–	0
Westmar	4	–	2	–	0	4	–	4	–	0
Northwestern (IA)	3	–	3	–	0	3	–	4	–	1
Concordia (NE)	2	–	4	–	0	3	–	6	–	0
Yankton	2	–	4	–	0	5	–	4	–	0
Sioux Falls	1	–	5	–	0	1	–	8	–	0
$ – Conference champion

1962 Tri-State Conference football standings
	Conf.					Overall
Team	W		L		T	W		L		T
Dana +	5	–	1	–	0	6	–	3	–	0
Concordia (NE) +	5	–	1	–	0	7	–	2	–	0
Midland	4	–	2	–	0	6	–	2	–	0
Westmar	4	–	2	–	0	5	–	4	–	0
Yankton	2	–	4	–	0	3	–	6	–	0
Sioux Falls	1	–	5	–	0	1	–	8	–	0
Northwestern (IA)	0	–	6	–	0	0	–	8	–	0
+ – Conference co-champions

1963 Tri-State Conference football standings
	Conf.					Overall
Team	W		L		T	W		L		T
Midland $	5	–	0	–	1	6	–	1	–	1
Concordia (NE)	5	–	1	–	0	6	–	3	–	0
Westmar	4	–	1	–	1	6	–	1	–	2
Northwestern (IA)	3	–	3	–	0	4	–	4	–	0
Dana	2	–	4	–	0	2	–	6	–	0
Yankton	1	–	5	–	0	1	–	8	–	0
Sioux Falls	0	–	6	–	0	1	–	7	–	0
$ – Conference champion

1964 Tri-State Conference football standings
	Conf.					Overall
Team	W		L		T	W		L		T
Westmar $	5	–	1	–	0	8	–	1	–	0
Northwestern (IA)	4	–	2	–	0	6	–	2	–	0
Yankton	4	–	2	–	0	5	–	4	–	0
Midland	4	–	2	–	0	4	–	4	–	0
Concordia (NE)	3	–	3	–	0	5	–	4	–	0
Dana	1	–	5	–	0	2	–	6	–	0
Sioux Falls	0	–	6	–	0	0	–	9	–	0
$ – Conference champion

1965 Tri-State Conference football standings
	Conf.					Overall
Team	W		L		T	W		L		T
Westmar +	5	–	1	–	0	7	–	1	–	1
Midland +	5	–	1	–	0	6	–	2	–	0
Yankton	4	–	2	–	0	7	–	2	–	0
Concordia (NE)	3	–	3	–	0	6	–	3	–	0
Dana	2	–	4	–	0	2	–	6	–	0
Northwestern (IA)	1	–	5	–	0	2	–	6	–	0
Sioux Falls	1	–	5	–	0	2	–	7	–	0
+ – Conference co-champions

1966 Tri-State Conference football standings
	Conf.					Overall
Team	W		L		T	W		L		T
Yankton +	5	–	1	–	0	8	–	1	–	0
Westmar +	5	–	1	–	0	7	–	2	–	0
Sioux Falls	4	–	2	–	0	6	–	3	–	0
Dana	2	–	4	–	0	3	–	5	–	0
Concordia (NE)	2	–	4	–	0	2	–	5	–	2
Midland	2	–	4	–	0	2	–	6	–	0
Northwestern (IA)	1	–	5	–	0	2	–	6	–	0
+ – Conference co-champions

1967 Tri-State Conference football standings
	Conf.					Overall
Team	W		L		T	W		L		T
Westmar $	6	–	0	–	0	8	–	1	–	0
Yankton	5	–	1	–	0	8	–	1	–	0
Sioux Falls	4	–	2	–	0	7	–	2	–	0
Dana	2	–	3	–	1	2	–	4	–	2
Midland	1	–	3	–	2	2	–	6	–	0
Concordia (NE)	1	–	5	–	0	2	–	7	–	0
Northwestern (IA)	0	–	5	–	1	0	–	7	–	1
$ – Conference champion

1968 Tri-State Conference football standings
	Conf.					Overall
Team	W		L		T	W		L		T
Westmar $	6	–	0	–	0	9	–	0	–	0
Concordia (NE)	5	–	1	–	0	6	–	3	–	0
Northwestern (IA)	4	–	2	–	0	7	–	2	–	0
Dana	2	–	4	–	0	3	–	6	–	0
Sioux Falls	2	–	4	–	0	3	–	6	–	0
Yankton	1	–	4	–	1	1	–	7	–	1
Midland	0	–	5	–	1	0	–	8	–	1
$ – Conference champion

1969 Tri-State Conference football standings
	Conf.					Overall
Team	W		L		T	W		L		T
Yankton $	5	–	1	–	0	8	–	1	–	0
Concordia (NE)	4	–	1	–	1	4	–	5	–	1
Northwestern (IA)	4	–	2	–	0	7	–	2	–	0
Westmar	3	–	3	–	0	5	–	4	–	0
Dana	2	–	3	–	1	2	–	6	–	1
Midland	1	–	5	–	0	1	–	7	–	0
Sioux Falls	1	–	5	–	0	1	–	8	–	0
$ – Conference champion

1970 Tri-State Conference football standings
	Conf.					Overall
Team	W		L		T	W		L		T
No. 14 Yankton $	6	–	0	–	0	8	–	2	–	0
No. 13 Concordia (NE)	5	–	1	–	0	8	–	1	–	0
Northwestern (IA)	4	–	2	–	0	6	–	3	–	0
Westmar	3	–	3	–	0	5	–	4	–	0
Dana	2	–	4	–	0	3	–	6	–	0
Midland	1	–	5	–	0	1	–	8	–	0
Sioux Falls	0	–	6	–	0	0	–	9	–	0
$ – Conference champion; Rankings from NAIA Division II poll

1971 Tri-State Conference football standings
	Conf.					Overall
Team	W		L		T	W		L		T
Northwestern (IA) $	4	–	1	–	0	6	–	3	–	0
Westmar	3	–	2	–	0	4	–	4	–	1
Concordia-St. Paul	3	–	2	–	0	4	–	5	–	0
Yankton	2	–	3	–	0	5	–	3	–	1
Bethel (MN)	1	–	4	–	0	1	–	8	–	0
Sioux Falls	0	–	5	–	0	0	–	8	–	1
$ – Conference champion

1972 Tri-State Conference football standings
	Conf.					Overall
Team	W		L		T	W		L		T
No. 2 Northwestern (IA) $^	5	–	0	–	0	10	–	1	–	0
Westmar	4	–	1	–	0	5	–	4	–	0
Concordia (MN)	2	–	3	–	0	4	–	4	–	0
Bethel (MN)	2	–	3	–	0	3	–	6	–	0
Sioux Falls	1	–	4	–	0	5	–	4	–	0
Yankton	1	–	4	–	0	2	–	7	–	0
$ – Conference champion; ^ – NAIA Division II playoff participant; Rankings from NAIA Division II poll

1973 Tri-State Conference football standings
	Conf.					Overall
Team	W		L		T	W		L		T
No. 1 Northwestern (IA) $^	5	–	0	–	0	12	–	0	–	0
No. 14 Yankton	4	–	1	–	0	7	–	2	–	0
Sioux Falls	2	–	3	–	0	5	–	5	–	0
Westmar	2	–	3	–	0	3	–	5	–	0
Bethel (MN)	2	–	3	–	0	3	–	6	–	0
Concordia (MN)	0	–	5	–	0	2	–	7	–	0
$ – Conference champion; ^ – NAIA Division II playoff participant; Rankings from NAIA Division II poll

1974 Tri-State Conference football standings
	Conf.					Overall
Team	W		L		T	W		L		T
No. 10 Northwestern (IA) $	5	–	0	–	0	8	–	2	–	0
No. 20 Yankton	4	–	1	–	0	7	–	2	–	0
Bethel (MN)	2	–	3	–	0	5	–	4	–	0
Sioux Falls	2	–	3	–	0	4	–	5	–	0
Westmar	2	–	3	–	0	3	–	5	–	0
Concordia (MN)	0	–	5	–	0	2	–	7	–	0
$ – Conference champion; Rankings from NAIA Division II poll

1975 Tri-State Conference football standings
	Conf.					Overall
Team	W		L		T	W		L		T
Bethel (MN) +	3	–	1	–	0	7	–	2	–	0
No. 19 Northwestern (IA) +	3	–	1	–	0	7	–	2	–	1
Yankton +	3	–	1	–	0	6	–	4	–	0
Westmar	1	–	3	–	0	2	–	6	–	0
Sioux Falls	0	–	4	–	0	2	–	7	–	0
+ – Conference co-champions; Rankings from NAIA Division II poll

1976 Tri-State Conference football standings
	Conf.					Overall
Team	W		L		T	W		L		T
Northwestern (IA) $	4	–	0	–	0	5	–	5	–	0
Bethel (MN)	3	–	1	–	0	7	–	2	–	0
Yankton	2	–	2	–	0	0	–	6	–	4
Sioux Falls	1	–	3	–	0	1	–	8	–	0
Westmar	0	–	4	–	0	0	–	9	–	0
$ – Conference champion

1977 Tri-State Conference football standings
	Conf.					Overall
Team	W		L		T	W		L		T
Northwestern (IA) $	2	–	0	–	0	6	–	4	–	0
Westmar	1	–	1	–	0	2	–	8	–	0
Sioux Falls	0	–	2	–	0	0	–	9	–	0
$ – Conference champion; Northwestern (IA) and Sioux Falls played twice, but only the first meeting counted in the conference standings.

1978 Tri-State Conference football standings
	Conf.					Overall
Team	W		L		T	W		L		T
No. 7 Northwestern (IA) $^	2	–	0	–	0	9	–	2	–	0
Westmar	2	–	1	–	0	8	–	2	–	0
Yankton	0	–	3	–	0	1	–	8	–	1
$ – Conference champion; ^ – NAIA Division II playoff participant; Rankings from NAIA Division II poll

1979 Tri-State Conference football standings
	Conf.					Overall
Team	W		L		T	W		L		T
No. 3 Northwestern (IA) $^	2	–	0	–	0	10	–	2	–	0
No. 20 Westmar	2	–	1	–	0	7	–	3	–	0
Yankton	0	–	3	–	0	5	–	6	–	0
$ – Conference champion; ^ – NAIA Division II playoff participant; Rankings from NAIA Division II poll

1980 Tri-State Conference football standings
	Conf.					Overall
Team	W		L		T	W		L		T
Northwestern (IA)	2	–	0	–	0	6	–	3	–	0
Westmar	1	–	1	–	0	7	–	3	–	0
Yankton	0	–	2	–	0	3	–	7	–	0
$ – Conference champion

== See also ==
- List of defunct college football conferences
