= Westmar University =

Private university in Le Mars, Iowa, U.S. (1887–1997)

Coordinates: 42.779632°N 96.162763°W

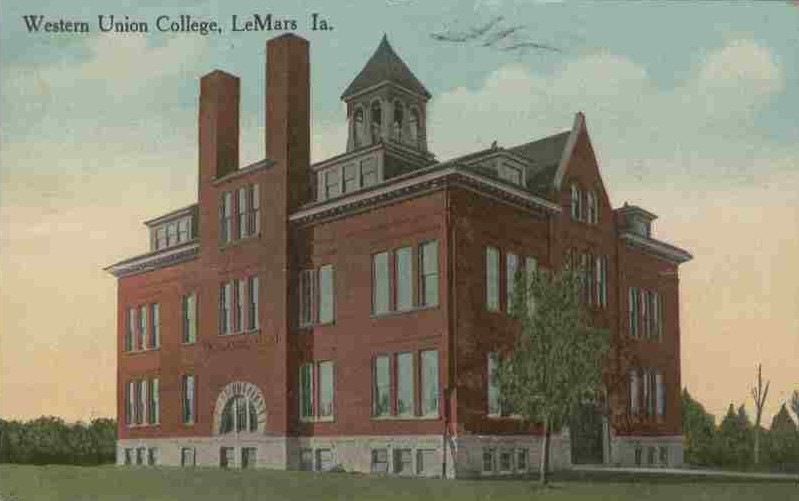
Postcard picture of Western Union College, mailed in 1922

Westmar University was a private four-year liberal arts college in Le Mars, Iowa, United States. It was founded in 1887 as the Northwestern Normal School and Business College. In 1948, the college was renamed as Westmar College. In March 1990, Westmar merged with Teikyo University to form Teikyo Westmar University. It became Westmar University in 1995 and closed in 1997.

== History ==
Westmar University was founded in 1887 as the Northwestern Normal School and Business College by Jacob Wernli, the Plymouth County Superintendent of Schools. Wernli severed his direct association with the school in 1891. In 1892 it was taken over by the Le Mars Normal Association, an organization of local businessmen who saw value in having a college in the town, and renamed as Le Mars Normal School. It emphasized the training of teachers for public schools. In 1900, ownership of the college was transferred to the United Evangelical Church, renaming it Western Union College. During World War II, Western Union College trained Naval Air Cadets in primary flight, at first with three bi-planes and later in Piper Cub aircraft.

Over the decades, the Westmar Eagles fielded NAIA varsity teams in football, baseball, volleyball, basketball, cross country, track and field and wrestling as a charter member of the Iowa Intercollegiate Athletic Conference, and then transferring in the 1960s to the Tri-State Conference (1960–1981). In the mid and late 1960s, the Eagles football team won a few conference titles, including the 1968 Westmar Eagles football team.

In 1948, the college was renamed as Westmar College. In 1954, Westmar merged with York College of Nebraska, making it the only college west of the Mississippi River affiliated with the Evangelical United Brethren Church, the successor institution to the United Evangelical Church. As such, it attracted students from a wide geographical area and expanded to an enrollment of more than 1,000 students. It lost this distinction when the Evangelical United Brethren Church merged with The Methodist Church to form the United Methodist Church in 1968. Given other social changes in those years, Westmar found it increasingly difficult to attract students and began to accumulate debt.

In March 1990, Westmar merged with Teikyo University to form Teikyo Westmar University. Teikyo agreed to send 500 Japanese students to the Iowa campus, at a cost of $15,000 each, and to give an additional $4 million for debt reduction. Accordingly, the need to create a substantial English as a Second Language program became urgent since almost none of the 500 Japanese students were proficient in English to be capable of completing academic work in the English language. The efforts to integrate Japanese students into the academic classes largely failed. The next few years were tumultuous ones for the college.

The United Methodist Church severed its ties with the college two months after the merger with Teikyo. In 1994, the school was threatened with revocation of its accreditation by the North Central Association of Colleges and Schools; it was placed on a two-year probation in August of that year. The probation was renewed in 1996. In 1995, Robert Driscoll, a private investor from California, purchased the college from Teikyo University. With the addition of graduate classes, he renamed it Westmar University. Less than a year later, the city of Le Mars extended a $40,000 loan to the school to keep it afloat, and in 1996 it bought the school outright.

On October 9, 1997, Westmar University announced that, barring a merger with another college, the college would close on November 21. The final classes were held on that date, and on November 22, 1997, following its last commencement, Westmar officially closed.

== Presidents ==
	Name	Tenure	Notes
1st	Jacob Wernli	1887–92	Establishment of a Normal School
2nd	Jacob Wernli (as head of Le Mars Normal Association)	1892–1900	
3rd	Rev. "H. H." (Herman Henry) Thoren	1900–06	named Western Union College in 1900; rebuilt campus buildings after a huge fire
4th	M. T. Maze	1906–09	
5th	Dr. Rev. Charles C. Poling	1909–11	
6th	Dr. Rev. Charles Adolphus Mock	1911–30	
7th	Dr. David Orion Kime	1930–56	Named Westmar College in 1948; merged with York College in 1954 (York College was est. in 1890)
8th	Harry H. Kalas ('25)	1956–68	
9th	Dr. John Forrest Courter	1970–79	
10th	Dr. Benjamin Wade	1979–81	
11th	Dr. Arthur Richardson	1982–91	Merged with Teikyo University, renamed Teikyo Westmar University in 1990
12th	Dr. Joseph David Olander	1992–94	North Central Association puts Teikyo Westmar U on probation in 1994
13th	Dr. David E. Hannie (interim president)	1994–95	
14th	Dr. George J. Hagerty	1995	Advanced Worldwide Education buys campus from Teikyo University, April 1995; renamed Westmar University
15th	Dr. Glenn M. Balch, Jr.	1995–96	
16th	John Harty	1996–97	Westmar University closes operations November 21, 1997

== Notable people ==
=== Notable alumni ===
- Don Birmingham (B.A. '62), head football coach at Yankton College in the 60s and University of Dubuque in the '70s & '80s
- Ardie Davis (Ph.B.), Barbeque Hall of Fame member, author of eleven books.
- Dennis Eckhoff (B.A. '67), head football coach at New Mexico Highlands University
- Lynn Evans (B.A. '86), state Senator of Iowa since 2023.
- Glenn Jagodzinske (B.A. '69), coach at Huron College in SD and Washburn University in Kansas
- Rueben Job (B.A., '54), Bishop of the United Methodist Church.
- Dan Johnston, (B.A. '60) Iowa lawyer who won a case before the U.S. Supreme Court; state legislator of Iowa; director of GMHC
- Milt Martin, (B.A. '53), athletic director and wrestling coach at Westmar from 1962 until it closed in 1997. He also was head football coach for seven seasons.
- Frederick Messmore, Justice of the Nebraska Supreme Court.
- Daniel L. Overmyer FRSC (B.A. '57), professor of the history of religion at University of British Columbia in Canada
- Donald Paulin went to Westmar for three years, Le Mars mayor and state legislator from 1983 to 1989.
- Gloria Shillingford (B.A., '93), member of the House of Assembly of Dominica.
- Chuck Soderberg (B.A., '79), state legislator of Iowa from 2005 to 2015.
- Phyllis Thede (B.A., '77), state legislator of Iowa from 2009 to 2023.
- Jenny Town (B.A. '95), senior fellow of the think tank, the Stimson Center

=== Honorary degree recipients ===
- Edsel Albert Ammons, bishop and minister in the African Methodist Episcopal Church - 1975
- Wayne K. Clymer, scholar, bishop of the United Methodist Church
- Charles B. Hoeven, U.S. Congressman from 1943 to 1965 - 1956
- Rueben Philip Job, bishop of the United Methodist Church - 1975
- Paul W. Milhouse, bishop of the United Methodist Church - 1965
- W. Robert Parks, President of Iowa State University - 1968
- Clark Terry, jazz trumpet legend - 1995

=== Notable faculty and staff ===
- Darrell Bevell, football coach (later Seattle Seahawks asst coach)
- Dick Crayne, football coach (1939–1951)
- Clyde A. Drury, basketball & football coach (1936–1939)
- John Harty, last president
- Jack Scott, football coach of Westmar's multi-conference championship teams (1961–1969) [coaching record of 60-17-3]
