= Yankton College =

Private college in South Dakota, US (1881–1984)

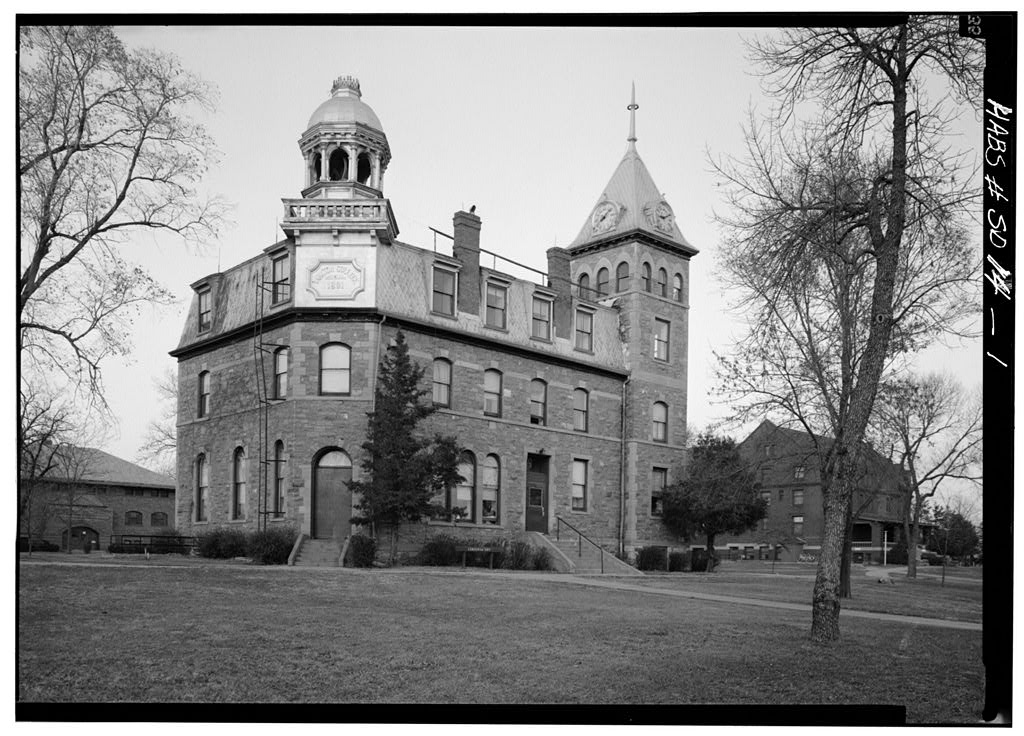
- The Yankton College Conservatory in 1912
- Motto: Christ for the World
- Active: 1881; 145 years ago – 1984; 42 years ago
- Founder: Joseph Ward
- Religious affiliation: United Church of Christ
- Students: 240 (final)
- Mascot: Greyhounds
- Website: www.yanktoncollege.org

- Yankton College Historic District
- U.S. National Register of Historic Places
- U.S. Historic district
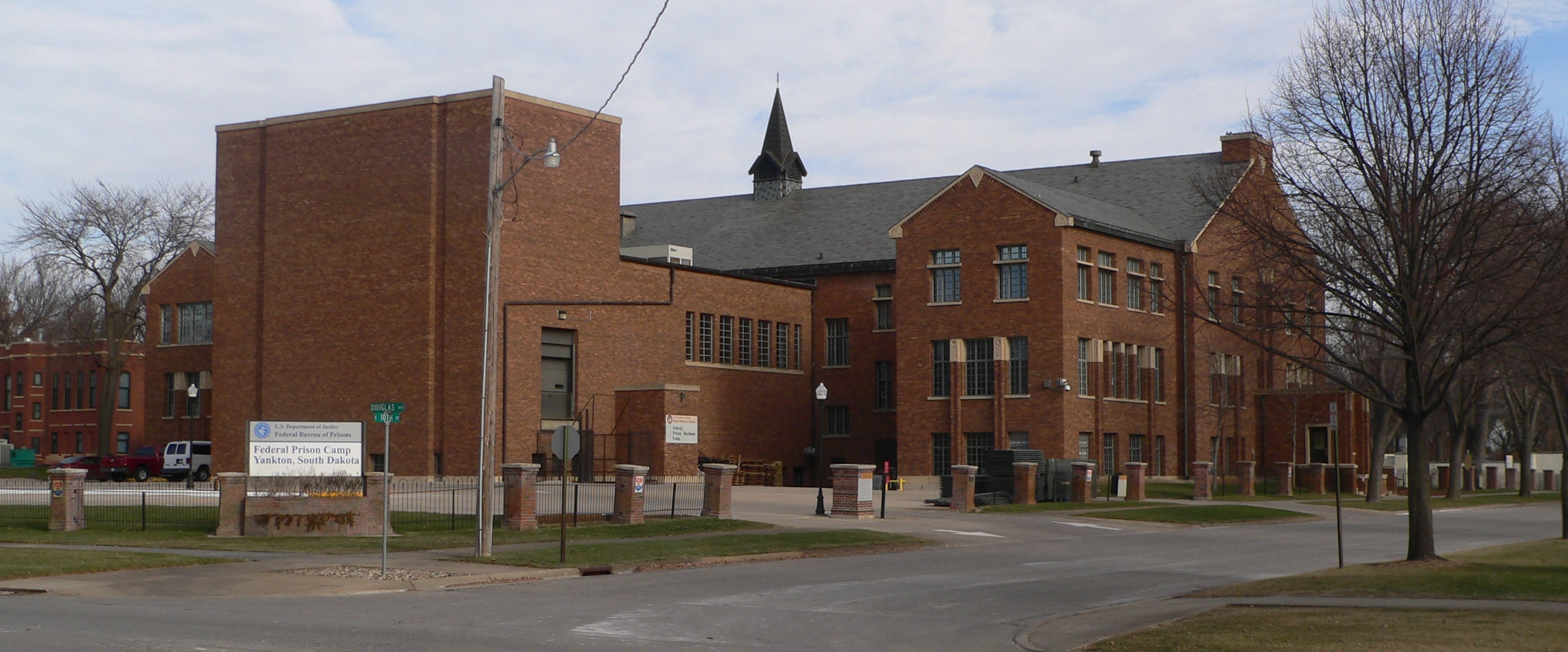

- Location within South Dakota Location within the United States
- Location: Yankton, South Dakota
- Coordinates: 42°52′49″N 97°23′25″W
- Built: 1894
- Architect: Elmslie, George
- Architectural style: Romanesque
- NRHP reference No.: 82003949
- Added to NRHP: March 22, 1982

Yankton College was a private liberal arts college in Yankton, South Dakota, United States, affiliated with the Congregational Christian Churches (later the United Church of Christ). Yankton College produced nine Rhodes Scholars, more than any other South Dakota higher education institution, and a United States Senator. According to the following list published by the Rhodes Trust, Yankton College produced more Rhodes Scholars per capita than most large universities in the U.S.

== History ==
Founded in 1881, it was the first institution of higher learning in the Dakota Territory. The man primarily responsible for the college's establishment was Joseph Ward, a local pastor and educator who is one of the two South Dakotans represented in the National Statuary Hall.

Yankton College closed in December 1984, and its campus became the site of Federal Prison Camp, Yankton, which opened four years later.

== Campus ==
The campus was declared the Yankton College Historic District in 1982 due to the presence of a group of buildings designed by architect George Grant Elmslie. Between 1927 and 1932, Elmslie designed seven structures for the college, of which several were built:

- Campus Library (1927/1928)
- Forbes Hall of Science (1929)
- Look Chapel, project (1929)
- Power plant (1930)
- Look Dormitory for Men (1931)
- Conservatory of Music (1932)
- Gymnasium, project (1932)

== Athletics ==
The college's athletic teams were known as the Greyhounds. The football stadium (Crane–Youngworth Field) is now used as the home field for the Yankton High School Bucks and Mount Marty University Lancers football teams.

Yankton College began football in 1894. In 1917 they became one of the charter members of the South Dakota Intercollegiate Athletic Conference. From 1960 to 1980 Yankton competed in the Tri-State Conference with private schools in Iowa and Nebraska. Yankton returned to the SDIAC in 1981, remaining until the school closed. The most successful seasons were as members of the Tri-State.

== Notable alumni ==
- Lyle Alzado, former National Football League All-Pro defensive lineman.
- Rich Bisaccia, former interim head coach of the Las Vegas Raiders of the National Football League.
- Gabor Boritt, the Robert Fluhrer Professor of Civil War Studies and Director of the Civil War Institute at Gettysburg College
- Joseph H. Bottum, 27th Lieutenant Governor of South Dakota and a member of the United States Senate
- Amanda Clement (1888–1971), first paid female umpire
- Amy Ellerman (1887–1960), contralto and voice teacher
- Agnes Fenenga (1874–1949), American missionary in Turkiye and Syria
- Riley Gardner, psychologist
- Les Goodman, former running back in the National Football League
- Alvin Hansen, Harvard College economics professor
- David P. Hardy, co-founder Boys’ Latin of Philadelphia Charter School, President, Girard College, Distinguished Senior Fellow, Commonwealth Foundation
- Michael Jaffe, TV and film producer
- Fred Kirschenmann, professor and leader in the sustainable agriculture movement.
- Nancy Lenehan, American actress
- Ruben Mendoza, strength and conditioning coach and a former guard in the National Football League
- Earl Rose, Dallas County medical examiner at the time of the assassination of John F. Kennedy
- Dean Wink, former defensive end in the National Football League and member of the South Dakota House of Representatives
