= Midland University =

Private university in Fremont, Nebraska, US

- Former names: Luther Academy (1883–1962); Midland College (1919–1962); Midland Lutheran College (1962–2010)
- Type: Private university
- Established: 1883
- Religious affiliation: Evangelical Lutheran Church in America
- President: Aly Williams
- Students: 1,724 (2024)
- Location: Fremont, Nebraska, U.S. 41.438°N 96.488°W
- Campus: 33 acres (13 ha)
- Colors: Navy blue and orange
- Nickname: Warriors
- Sporting affiliations: NAIA – GPAC
- Website: midlandu.edu
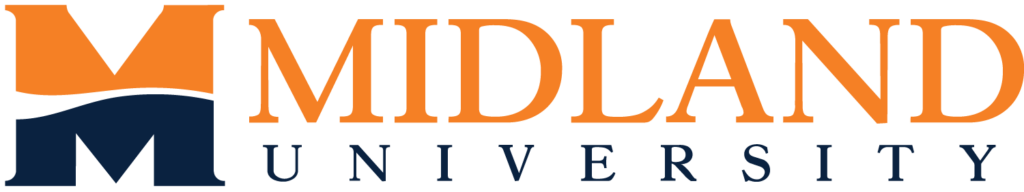

Midland University is a private Lutheran university in Fremont, Nebraska, United States. It has an approximate enrollment of 1,600 students on 33-acre (13 ha) campus. Known as Midland Lutheran College from 1962 to 2010, the college is affiliated with the Evangelical Lutheran Church in America.

== History ==
Midland University was founded as an educational institution in 1883 as Luther Academy. The original building, located in Wahoo, Nebraska, was dedicated on November 10, 1883, the 400th anniversary of Martin Luther’s birth. The current college is also a product of Midland College, founded in 1887 by the Evangelical Lutheran General Synod of the United States of America. Midland College, originally located in Atchison, Kansas, moved to the college's current location in Fremont, Nebraska in 1919. Luther Academy, later named Luther College, combined with Midland College as Midland Lutheran College in 1962.

In October 1924, the Gymnasium-Commons building, now known as the Olson Student Center, was dedicated.

Men's Memorial Hall was officially dedicated in the fall of 1947. It was a new all-men dormitory honoring the students who served during World War II.

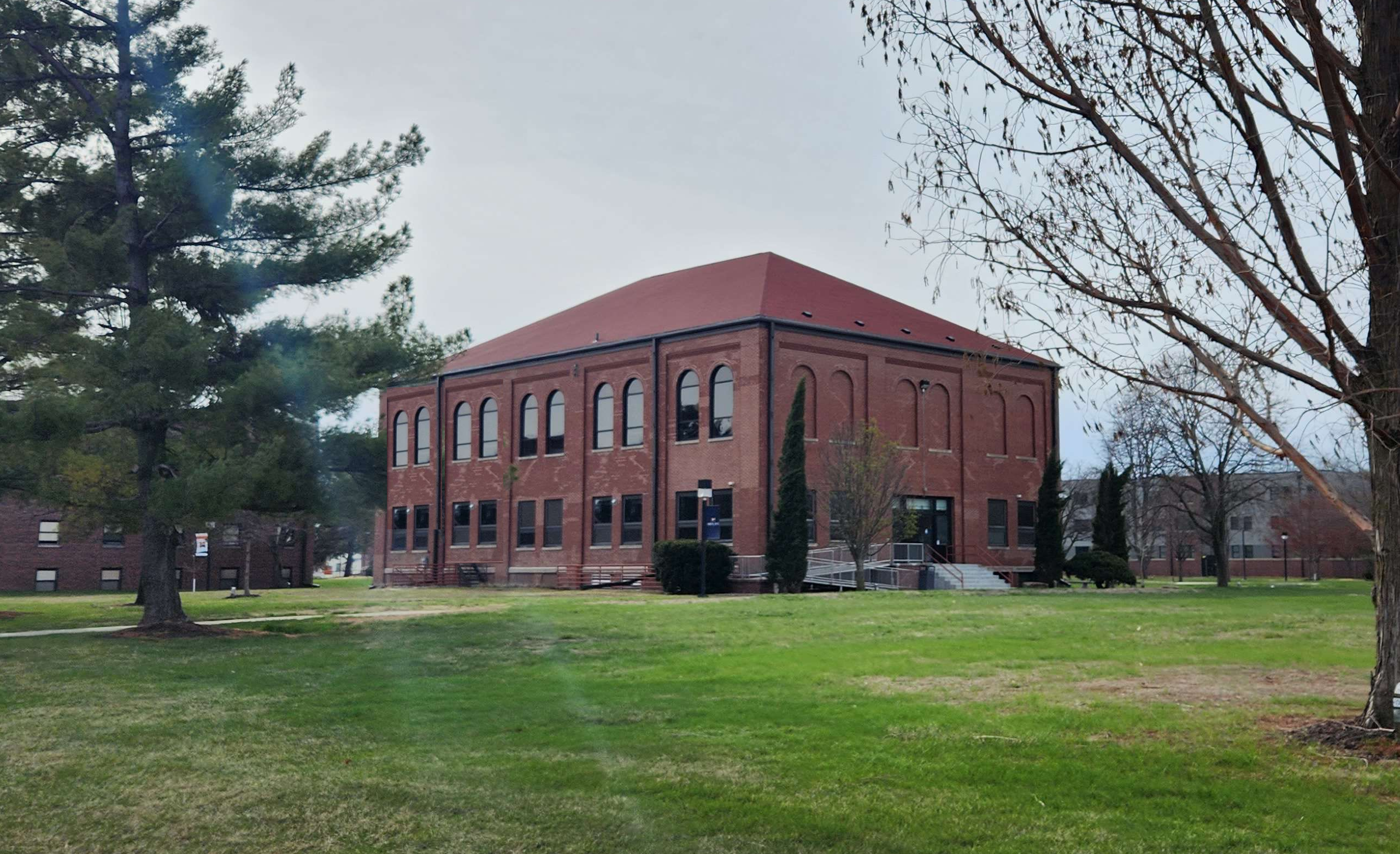
Clemmons Hall, the oldest building in Midland, built in 1907

In 2009, Midland Lutheran College had a seven-figure financial deficit and its lowest enrollment since the Second World War, at 598.

Following the closure of nearby Dana College in 2010, Midland Lutheran College allowed former Dana students to transfer all Dana credits, honored all Dana academic, athletic and need-based scholarships and grants and waived enrollment deposits for Dana students. Of the roughly 600 Dana students, approximately 275 enrolled at Midland in the fall of 2010.

Midland Lutheran College was renamed Midland University in 2010. Along with the name change, the institution also changed its official colors from black and orange to navy blue and orange.

In 2011, Midland introduced a program guaranteeing that participating students would graduate in four years. The school's freshman enrollment increased by 32% from fall 2011 to fall 2012; then-president Ben Sasse (who went on to serve as United States senator from Nebraska from 2015 to 2023, and was the 13th President of the University of Florida, Gainesville) attributed this growth, in part, to the new policy.

From the fall of 2009 to the fall of 2013, Midland's enrollment more than doubled from a low of 590 in 2009 to 1,288 in 2013. During the same time, Midland went “from a seven-figure deficit to seven-figure surpluses.”

In 2018, plans were announced to replace Men's Memorial Hall with a new 98-bed facility known as the Miller Hall. Groundbreaking was held on April 2, 2019 and the Miller Hall officially opened in August 2020.

== Academics ==
Midland University offers bachelor's degrees in more than thirty fields of study as well as three master's degrees.

In 2010, the school claimed to have a graduate placement rate of 100% for nursing students and 90% for education students.

In addition to offering Master of Education in Leadership and Master of Professional Accounting degrees, the junior college announced the offering of an MBA program in 2012.

== Student activities ==
Midland University offers over 60 student clubs and organizations and several intramural sports offerings, including basketball, sand volleyball, dodgeball, ultimate frisbee, and softball. The university has six social fraternities and sororities: Beta Sigma Psi fraternity; Sigma Rho fraternity; Kappa Phi fraternity; Phi Omega sorority; Pi Epsilon sorority; and Tri Phi sorority. Other student organizations include Phi Beta Lambda – Students in Free Enterprise (PBL- SIFE), Student Art Association, Campus Crusades for Christ, Student Education Association, Blue Key, Cardinal Key, Anderson Scholar Leaders, Student Ambassadors, and Short Attention Span.

In 2017, Midland revived its speech and debate team. In its early days, Midland had been a member of the Pi Kappa Delta national forensics honor society. The team is regionally successful and took third place in individual events at the 2024 national Pi Kappa Delta tournament.

== Athletics ==
The Midland athletic teams are called the Warriors. The university is a member of the National Association of Intercollegiate Athletics (NAIA), primarily competing in the Great Plains Athletic Conference (GPAC) for most of its sports since the 1969–1970 academic year. The university's official colors are navy blue and orange.

Midland competes in 32 intercollegiate varsity sports: Men's sports include baseball, basketball, bowling, cross country, football, golf, ice hockey, lacrosse, powerlifting, soccer, swimming & diving, tennis, track and field (indoor and outdoor) and wrestling; while women's sports include basketball, bowling, cross country, flag football, golf, ice hockey, lacrosse, powerlifting, soccer, softball, swimming & diving, tennis, track and field (indoor and outdoor), volleyball and wrestling; and co-ed sports include cheerleading, dance, eSports and shotgun sports.

=== History ===
Midland has expanded the athletic department since 2010. Midland has added men's and women's lacrosse, men's and women's bowling, men's and women's wrestling, shotgun sports, men's and women's ice hockey, women's flag football, powerlifting, and men's and women's swimming.

=== Accomplishments ===
The Warriors softball team appeared in two Women's College World Series (WCWS) in 1970 and 1971. The Midland Wildfire dance team has won the Great Plains Athletic Conference title from 2014 to 2019, plus the 2017, 2019, and 2025 NAIA national titles.

== Notable alumni ==
- Jim Buchanan, baseball player
- Jon Christensen, politician
- Clifton Hillegass, publisher, creator of CliffsNotes
- Gwen Howard, politician
- Toni Jeričević, actor, TV host
- Henry Margenau, physicist
- George Mendenhall, professor, Lutheran theologian
- Raymond S. Miller, soldier
- Paul Norris, comic book artist, creator of Aquaman
- Kai Kamaka III, MMA
