= Dana College =

Private college in Blair, Nebraska, US (1896–2010)

Coordinates: 41°33′01″N 96°09′22″W

- Motto: Veritas Vincit
- Type: Private college
- Active: 1896–2010
- Location: Blair, Nebraska, U.S.
- Campus: Rural
- Colors: Red and white
- Nickname: Vikings
- Sporting affiliations: NAIA – GPAC
- Mascot: Viking
- Website: http://www.dana.edu

Dana College was a private college in Blair, Nebraska, United States. The college was founded from a merger of Trinity Seminary and Blair College in 1896. The college changed its name to Dana College in 1902. The name "Dana" is the poetic variant of "Denmark". Its rural 150-acre (607,000 m^{2}) campus is approximately 26 miles (40 km) northwest of Omaha and overlooks a portion of the Missouri River Valley. It closed in 2010.

== History ==
Dana College's earliest predecessor, Trinity Seminary, was formed in 1884 to train pastors for the Danish Evangelical Lutheran Church Association in America. In 1896, DELCA merged with the Danish Evangelical Church in North America to create the United Danish Evangelical Lutheran Church. As a result of the merger Trinity Seminary merged with Blair College. The combined college became known as Dana College in 1902.

On August 25, 1988, an electrical fire severely damaged Old Main, the oldest building on campus. The fire injured one fireman and cancelled renovations of the building. After the fire, the building was rendered unusable and was demolished later that month. In 1989, Dana College announced replacement to Old Main, which included expanding other buildings. Old Main's replacement, now known as Trinity Chapel, was completed in 1993.

=== Closure ===
The institution faced significant financial challenges in the 2000s. Dana College reported that its deficit rose from US$7,170,000 in 2005 to more than US$12,550,000 in 2009. The Dana College Board of Regents attempted to convince major donors to make contributions to the college. Yet Dana College was unable to attract the donations to erase the deficit and fund on-going operations.

In 2010, a private equity company announced its intent to purchase Dana College. The sale would have caused Dana to lose its not-for-profit status and would turn Dana into a for-profit college. However, the accreditation committee refused to transfer the accreditation to the new owners, causing Dana to close.

Midland University of Fremont, Nebraska, allowed all former Dana College students to transfer all Dana college credits, honored all Dana academic, athletic and need-based scholarships and grants, and waived enrollment deposits for Dana students. Of the roughly 600 Dana students, approximately 275 enrolled at Midland in the fall of 2010.

=== Post-closure activity ===
In 2013, Midland University, experiencing increasing enrollment and considering expansion, leased the Dana campus with the option of purchasing it; the land was purchased instead by Frank Krejci, an Omaha developer, for $3.5 million, who then donated it to Ed Shada, an Omaha banker, to lead redevelopment of the campus. In 2016, Midland announced that it would not re-open the Dana campus, but would concentrate its expansion efforts in Fremont and Omaha. According to a Midland press release, high maintenance costs and "a complicated path to accreditation" dissuaded them from carrying through their plans for the Blair site.

The land was to become the new home of Omaha's Grace University in 2018, after the school sold a large part of its campus to Omaha Public Schools. However, Grace too announced its folding at the end of the 2017–18 academic year, and the move to Blair did not occur. In 2018, alumni and friends of Grace founded Charis University with the intent of occupying the Dana campus and becoming a spiritual successor to Grace.

In 2018 Angels Share, a nonprofit organization, acquired the land. In cooperation in with The Metro Area Planning Agency and the City of Blair, portions of the campus have been sold off, while others have been redeveloped. The former residence halls have been converted into housing for young adults who have aged out of the foster care system. The former Dana Campus was converted into apartments, which opened in February 2024.

=== Presidents ===
The Presidents of Dana College were:

- Kristian Anker (1902–1905)
- C. X. Hansen (1908–1914, 1919–1925, 1936–1938)
- Erland Nelson (1931–1936)
- Lawrence Siersbeck (1938–1944)
- R. E. Morton (1944–1956)
- C. C. Madsen (1956–1971)
- Earl R. Mezoff (1971–1978)
- James Kallas (1978–1985)
- Myrvin Christopherson (1986–2005)
- Janet Philipp (2005–2010)

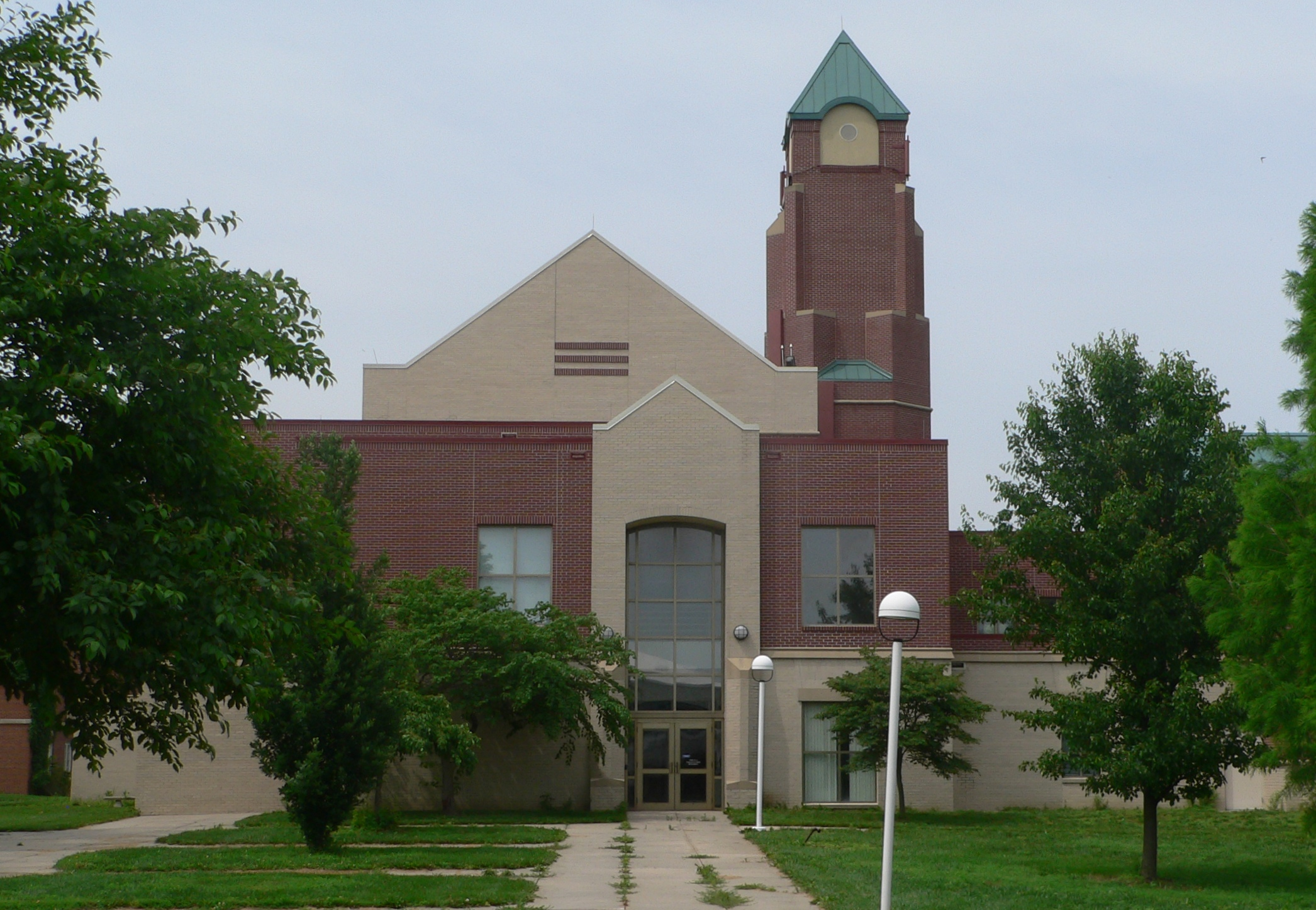
Trinity Chapel

== Campus ==
The campus has 151 acres (61 ha) of space. It is about 26 miles (42 km) northwest of Omaha. Rasmussen Hall housed first and second year students. It was coed, with each wing or each floor housing a sex. Holling Hall housed first and second year students.

Blair Hall housed upperclassmen, and first year students were not eligible to live there. Previously Mickelsen Hall housed both men and women on different floors. In the summer of 2007 Mickelsen was renovated so it housed upperclassmen women. In the fall of 2006 the school opened the Suite-Style Apartments for third and fourth year students.

The university maintained Omaha Village Apartments, for married and non-traditional students. Omaha Village had one and two bedroom apartments. Dana College expected its students to live on campus for all of their years. Any students wishing to live off campus were required to gain approval. The campus was listed on the National Register of Historic Places in 2021.

== Notable alumni ==
- Matty Lewis (1998), co-lead singer of the La Habra, CA based punk rock band Zebrahead
- Benson Henderson (2006), current mixed martial artist, former Bellator MMA and UFC Lightweight Champion
- Richard A. Jensen, theologian, professor and author
- Paul Simon, U.S. Senator from Illinois. He attended but did not graduate.
- Megan Hunt, Member of the Nebraska Legislature from the 8th district. Hunt earned a Bachelors of Arts in Intercultural communication and German from Dana College in Blair in 2008.

== Athletics ==
The Dana athletic teams were called the Vikings. The college was a member of the National Association of Intercollegiate Athletics (NAIA), primarily competing in the Great Plains Athletic Conference (GPAC) from 1969–70 to 2009–10. Dana competed in 18 intercollegiate varsity sports: Men's sports included baseball, basketball, cross country, football, golf, soccer, track & field and wrestling; while women's sports included basketball, cheerleading, cross country, dance, golf, lacrosse, soccer, softball, track & field and volleyball.

In January 2009, college administrators considered changing conference affiliations; however, outcry from alumni caused the school to rethink its position. The college also had a number of intramural and club sports programs below the varsity level, operating independently of the athletic department.
