= Deaths in January 1980 =

The following is a list of notable deaths in January 1980. Entries for each day are listed alphabetically by surname. A typical entry lists information in the following sequence:

- Name, age, country of citizenship at birth, subsequent country of citizenship (if applicable), reason for notability, cause of death (if known), and reference.

== January 1980 ==
=== 1 ===
- Alfréd von Adda, 91, Hungarian Olympic equestrian (1928).
- Aldo Aimi, 73, Italian footballer.
- Irene Aloisi, 54, Italian actress.
- John L. Brunner, 50, American politician, member of the Pennsylvania House of Representatives (since 1965).
- Thomas Cameron, 85, Canadian parasitologist.
- Ernest Cormier, 94, Canadian architect.
- Adolph Deutsch, 82, British-American composer, heart failure.
- Alberto Duñabeitia, 79, Spanish footballer.
- Harriet Whitney Frishmuth, 99, American sculptor.
- James Wilfred Jefford, 78, British naval admiral.
- Bill McCoy, 73, New Zealand cricketer.
- Pierre Mony, 83, French footballer.
- Pietro Nenni, 88, Italian politician, deputy prime minister (1945–1946, 1963–1968).
- Stepan Shchipachev, 81, Soviet poet.
- Charles Sirato, 74, Hungarian poet and translator.
- Nils Skoglund, 73, Swedish Olympic diver (1920).
- Gilbert E. Smith, 76, American college sports coach.
- Anne Burnett Tandy, 79, American rancher, art collector and philanthropist, cancer.
- Gerard Tap, 79, Dutch footballer.
- George Wardrope, 80, Canadian politician.
- Frank Wykoff, 70, American Olympic sprinter (1928, 1932, 1936), three-time gold medalist.

=== 2 ===
- Erik Andersen, 77, Danish Olympic racing cyclist (1924).
- Phyllis Barclay-Smith, 77, British ornithologist, stroke.
- Walter O. Bigby, 52, American politician and judge, member of the Louisiana House of Representatives (1968–1979), lung cancer.
- Alessandro Bruschetti, 69, Italian artist.
- Rhys Carpenter, 90, American art historian and archaeologist.
- Irene Crespin, 83, Australian geologist.
- Alexandra Illmer Forsythe, 61, American computer scientist.
- Kenny Hogan, 77, American baseball player.
- Torleiv Hytten, 89, Norwegian-Australian economist and academic administrator.
- George Lees, 84, American baseball player.
- Cecylia Vetulani, 71, Polish art historian.
- J. Mayo Williams, 85, American record producer.

=== 3 ===
- Joy Adamson, 69, Austrian conservationist and writer (Born Free), murdered.
- Lucien Buysse, 87, Belgian racing cyclist.
- George Sutherland Fraser, 64, Scottish poet and literary critic.
- Bob Geary, 88, American baseball player.
- Patrick Hutber, 51, British journalist, injuries sustained in a traffic collision.
- Bernhard Kaun, 80, American film composer.
- Colin Keith-Johnston, 83, British actor.
- Amos Milburn, 52, American singer and pianist, stroke.
- Harald Heide Steen, 68, Norwegian actor.
- Ivan Triesault, 81, Estonian-American actor, heart failure.

=== 4 ===
- Richard Bradford, 66, British Anglican prelate.
- Foster Edwards, 76, American baseball player.
- Ruth Garver Gagliardo, 84, American educator and literacy advocate.
- Tobie Goedewaagen, 84, Dutch philosopher, politician and Nazi collaborator.
- Axel Henry Hansen, 92, Norwegian Olympic gymnast (1912).
- Shohachi Ishii, 53, Japanese Olympic wrestler (1952), kidney cancer.
- Mariana Beauchamp Jodoin, 98, Canadian politician.
- Cole Lesley, 69, English writer and biographer.
- Rurie Morgan, 67, New Zealand cricketer.
- Michele Racco, 66, Italian-Canadian mobster (Siderno Group), cancer.
- Herbert Rollwage, 63, German flying ace.
- Cecil Sheridan, 69, Irish comedian and actor.
- Uncle Homer Walker, 81, American banjoist.

=== 5 ===
- Olav Berkaak, 64, Norwegian novelist.
- Klas Böök, 70, Swedish diplomat.
- Sir Roy Bucher, 84, British general.
- Bert Cronin, 77, British Olympic gymnast (1928).
- Glenn Frey, 67, American football player.
- Walther Gruner, 74, German-English opera singer and teacher.
- Giovanni Migliorini, 48, Italian footballer.
- Uno Naissoo, 51, Estonian jazz musician.
- George J. Richardson, 86, American trade unionist, cardiac arrest.

=== 6 ===
- Antonio Bilbao La Vieja, 87–88, Argentine rugby player and architect.
- Frank Fane, 82, Canadian politician, MP (1958–1968).
- June Gilmore, 57, American baseball player.
- Sir Francis Hill, 80, British historian.
- John Hoffman, 75, Hungarian-born American film editor.
- Jo Mendi II, 40, American chimpanzee.
- William Kay, 85, British Anglican prelate.
- Piersanti Mattarella, 44, Italian politician, president of Sicily (since 1978), shot.
- Raymond Mays, 80, English racing driver.
- Leonard Mitchell, 54, New Zealand artist.
- Boje Postel, 89, German-British painter.
- Dilipkumar Roy, 82, Indian musician and musicologist.
- Georgeanna Tillman, 35, American singer (The Marvelettes), sickle cell disease.
- Victor Tolgesy, 51, Hungarian-born Canadian sculptor.

=== 7 ===
- Yocheved Bat-Miriam, 78, Russian-born Israeli poet.
- Irene Beasley, 75, American singer, pneumonia.
- Kenneth S. Fagg, 78, American commercial artist.
- Cyril Mann, 68, British painter and sculptor.
- Simonne Mathieu, 71, French tennis player.
- Eddie Scarf, 71, Australian Olympic wrestler (1932, 1936).
- Sarah Selby, 74, American actress, cancer.
- Carl White, 47, American singer (The Rivingtons) and songwriter ("Papa-Oom-Mow-Mow").
- Larry Williams, 44, American singer and songwriter, suicide by gunshot.
- Dov Yosef, 80, Canadian-born Israeli politician.

=== 8 ===
- Günther Benecke, 56, German Olympic sailor (1960).
- Herb Cobb, 75, American baseball player.
- Oscar R. Ewing, 90, American lawyer and politician, pmeumonia.
- John Fahay, 77, American football player.
- Fred Geary, 92, English cricketer.
- Tryggve Gran, 91, Norwegian aviator and polar explorer.
- Gilbert C. Hoover, 85, American naval admiral.
- John Mauchly, 72, American physicist and computer designer (ENIAC), complications during heart surgery.
- Nureddine El-Rifai, 80, Lebanese politician, prime minister (1975).
- Harvey Russell, 92, American baseball player.
- Logan Sloane, 61, New Zealand politician.
- Władysław Turowicz, 71, Polish-Pakistani pilot and aeronautical engineer.

=== 9 ===
- Gaetano Belloni, 87, Italian racing cyclist.
- Stanley Bradshaw, 81, English cricketer.
- Sir Charles Curran, 58, Irish-born British television executive, heart attack.
- Hans Hoffmeister, 78, German Olympic discus thrower (1928).
- David Paver Mellor, 76, Australian chemist.
- Raymond Mortimer, 84, British writer and literary critic.
- Juhayman al-Otaybi, 43, Saudi religious dissident, leader of the Grand Mosque seizure, execution by beheading.
- Aleksander Tupalski, 79, Polish footballer and ice hockey player.
- Bull Wesley, 78, American football player.

=== 10 ===
- Javad Ameri, 88–89, Iranian politician.
- Ercole Carzino, 78, Italian footballer.
- Hughie Critz, 79, American baseball player.
- Louis Doedel, 74, Surinamese trade unionist.
- Charles Drummond Ellis, 84, English physicist.
- Eugene D. Lujan, 92, American judge.
- St. Clair McKelway, 74, American journalist.
- George Meany, 85, American trade unionist (AFL-CIO), cardiac arrest.
- Lilias Torrance Newton, 83, Canadian painter.
- Manuel Passos, 57, Portuguese footballer.
- Bo Rein, 34, American football coach, plane crash.
- Tan Yubao, 80–81, Chinese politician.
- Uno Willers, 68, Swedish historian and librarian.

=== 11 ===
- Valentine Blomfield, 81, British general.
- Einar Maynard Gunderson, 80, American-born Canadian politician.
- Richard Huschke, 86, German racing cyclist.
- Barbara Pym, 66, English novelist, cancer.
- Maurice Reckitt, 91, English writer.
- Celia Sánchez, 59, Cuban politician and revolutionary, lung cancer.
- Bruce Schultz, 66, Australian footballer.
- Jack Sykes, 68, English footballer.
- Lon Tinkle, 73, American writer and historian.
- Norris Whitney, 71, Canadian politician.

=== 12 ===
- Frederico de Freitas, 77, Portuguese composer.
- Hans Ebeling, 75, Australian cricketer.
- Saul Hayes, 73, Canadian lawyer.
- Max Kielbasa, 58, American football player.
- Hirdaya Behari Mathur, 51, Indian chemist.
- Edgardo Moltoni, 83, Italian ornithologist.
- Procopio Ortíz, 75, Mexican Olympic equestrian (1932).
- Antonio Pons, 82, Ecuadorian politician, president (1935).
- Finn Ronne, 80, Norwegian-born American polar explorer.
- John Joe Sheehy, 82, Irish footballer and political activist.
- Howel Williams, 81, British-American geologist and volcanologist.
- Tim Williamson, 23, American racing driver, racing crash.

=== 13 ===
- Eric Aldwinckle, 70, English-born Canadian illustrator.
- Gloria Jahoda, 53, American author.
- Andre Kostelanetz, 78, Russian-American conductor, pneumonia.
- Mario Mylius, 77, Swiss Olympic equestrian (1936).
- Charlie Sproull, 61, American baseball player.
- Monroe Swartz, 83, American baseball player.
- Warren L. Wood, 69, American politician and businessman, complications from a fall.

=== 14 ===
- Robert Ardrey, 71, American playwright (Thunder Rock), author (African Genesis) and screenwriter (Khartoum), lung cancer.
- Franciszek Białous, 78, Polish microbiologist.
- Rachel Fuller Brown, 81, American chemist.
- George S. Champlin, 97–98, American businessman.
- Pierre Devambez, 77, French archaeologist.
- Ernest Alexander Payne, 77, British historian and theologian.
- Po Par Gyi, 62, Burmese actor and opera singer.
- Denis Stairs, 90, Canadian engineer.

=== 15 ===
- Alan Breeze, 70, English singer and entertainer.
- Kim Bruce-Lockhart, 33, British squash player, heart attack.
- Lester Charlesworth, 63, Australian cricketer.
- Anne Fogarty, 60, American fashion designer, heart attack.
- Leszek Herdegen, 50, Polish actor.
- Jerzy Musiałek, 37, Polish footballer.
- Gary Sain, 48, American racing driver.
- Albert Staton, 80, American football and basketball player and businessman.
- Sir Winton Turnbull, 80, Australian politician, MP (1946–1972).
- David Whitfield, 53, British singer ("Answer Me"), stroke.

=== 16 ===
- Louis Brunhart, 77, Liechtensteiner politician.
- Leslie Curtis, 84, Canadian politician.
- Marien Oulton Dreyer, 68, Australian journalist and playwright.
- Max W. Kimmich, 86, German filmmaker.
- Naum Sorkin, 80, Soviet general and diplomat.
- Charles Henry Thompson, 84, American educational psychologist.

=== 17 ===
- Barbara Britton, 59, American actress, pancreatic cancer.
- Carr Collins Sr., 87, American insurance executive.
- Joseph Desmedt, 67, Belgian footballer.
- Sir Reginald Goff, 72, British judge.
- Nelson López, 38, Argentine footballer.
- Arieh Lubin, 82, American-born Israeli artist.
- Alexander Nesmeyanov, 80, Soviet chemist.
- Đorđije Pajković, 62, Yugoslav Montenegrin politician.
- Maurice Parish, 89, Australian politician.
- Maria Quisling, 79, Russian-Norwegian socialite, wife of Vidkun Quisling.
- Karla Schramm, 88, American actress.
- Emanuel Sejr, 88, Danish librarian and historian.
- Agustín Yáñez, 75, Mexican politician and writer, lung disease.

=== 18 ===
- Sir Cecil Beaton, 76, English photographer.
- Luis Cuadrado, 45, Spanish cinematographer, suicide.
- Fred Dewey, 81, Welsh footballer.
- Lisa Ekedahl, 84, Swedish lawyer and suffragist.
- L. Francis Griffin, 62, American civil rights activist, heart attack.
- George Evan Howell, 74, American politician and judge, member of the U.S. House of Representatives (1941–1947).
- Walter W. Wood, 85, American football player and coach.

=== 19 ===
- Dana X. Bible, 88, American football player and coach.
- Roy Burmister, 74, Canadian ice hockey player, heart attack.
- Desmond Code, 67, Canadian politician, MP (1965–1972).
- Lise Deharme, 81, French writer.
- William O. Douglas, 81, American judge, U.S. Supreme Court associate justice (1939–1975), kidney failure.
- J. Ebb Duncan, 70, American politician, member of the Georgia Senate (since 1973) and Georgia House of Representatives (1949–1964).
- Richard Franko Goldman, 69, American composer, bandleader and musicologist.
- Edward O. Hendricks, 50, American Anglo-Catholic prelate, liver failure.
- Kwak Sang-hoon, 83, South Korean politician, acting president (1960).
- Frederick Augustus Muhlenberg, 92, American architect and politician, member of the U.S. House of Representatives (1947–1949).
- Roy White, 62, New Zealand rugby player.

=== 20 ===
- Dietrich von Bausznern, 51, German composer.
- Rudolf Bürger, 71, Romanian football player and coach.
- George Colliflower, 93, American basketball player and coach.
- André Dubonnet, 82, French racing driver and flying ace.
- Henry Lee Johnson, 15, American child, shot.
- Kasturbhai Lalbhai, 85, Indian businessman and philanthropist.
- Howard Lebengood, 77, American football player.
- Waddy MacPhee, 80, American baseball player.
- Don Mason, 50, Canadian actor.
- Russell McDonald, 66, Australian politician.
- William Roberts, 84, British painter.
- Ed Schrom, 68, American politician.
- Russell Scott, 62, American boxer.
- Oliver Weerasinghe, 72, Sri Lankan diplomat, heart attack.

=== 21 ===
- Michel Adlen, 81, Russian-born French painter.
- Clyde Barnhart, 84, American baseball player.
- Frank Booth, 72, English cricketer.
- Violet Bowring, 89, New Zealand-Australian artist.
- Avery Craven, 94, American historian.
- Elvira de Hidalgo, 88, Spanish opera singer.
- Georges Painvin, 93, French cryptanalyst and geologist.
- Sir George Pirie, 83, British air marshal.
- Irene Rathbone, 87, English novelist.
- Gene Rye, 73, American baseball player.
- Philip von Saltza, 94, Swedish-born American artist.

=== 22 ===
- Carl G. Bachmann, 89, American politician, member of the U.S. House of Representatives (1925–1933).
- Yitzhak Baer, 91, German-Israeli historian.
- Madeleine Braun, 72, French politician and publisher.
- Eric Burhop, 68, Australian physicist, stomach cancer.
- Mustapha Choukri, 35, Moroccan footballer.
- Ernest R. Fatland, 83, American politician, member of the Oregon Senate (1945–1948) and House of Representatives (1935–1940).
- Ed Garland, 85, American jazz bassist.
- Walter Hall, 88, Australian-born English politician, MP (1924–1929, 1931–1935).
- Antal Hidas, 80, Hungarian writer and poet, cancer.
- Maud Isaacks, 94, American politician, member of the Texas House of Representatives (1954–1967).
- Alexandra Lublinskaya, 77, Soviet historian.
- Iris Meredith, 64, American actress, oral cancer.
- Teresa Noce, 79, Italian politician, journalist and trade unionist.
- Walter Pym, 74, Australian actor.
- Klas Särner, 88, Swedish Olympic gymnast (1920).
- Peter Schmidt, 48, German-born British artist, heart attack.
- Joseph Stanley Snowden, 78, British barrister and politician.
- Klaus Sunnanå, 74, Norwegian economist and fisheries director.
- Cyril Toulouse, 56, English footballer.
- Martti Viitanen, 67, Finnish politician.
- Tom Voyce, 82, English rugby player.

=== 23 ===
- George Arthur Buttrick, 87, English-born American preacher and author.
- Lil Dagover, 92, German actress.
- Fred Dick, 81, Australian footballer.
- Babs Gonzales, 60, American bebop musician, cancer.
- Frank A. Hoare, 85, English film producer.
- Shōjirō Iida, 91, Japanese general.
- Donald S. McGill, 73, American politician, member of the Iowa Senate (1965–1971).
- Giovanni Michelotti, 58, Italian automobile designer.
- Jacques Millot, 82, French arachnologist.
- Ernst Ocwirk, 53, Austrian football player and manager, multiple sclerosis.
- Leonard Strong, 71, American actor.
- A. M. Tariq, 56, Indian politician.
- Fred van der Poel, 77, Dutch footballer.
- Paul R. Williams, 85, American architect.
- Dušan Žanko, 75, Croatian writer and diplomat.

=== 24 ===
- Terry Anderson, 35, English footballer, drowned. (disappeared on this date)
- Fay Britt, 89, American politician, member of the Nebraska Legislature (1954–1955).
- Heikki Castrén, 50, Finnish architect.
- Buck Etchison, 64, American baseball player, heart attack.
- Frank Gabrielson, 69, American screenwriter.
- Sam Leitch, 52, Scottish journalist and sports presenter, heart attack.
- Mudigonda Lingamurthy, 71, Indian actor.
- Stanislav Neuhaus, 52, Soviet pianist.
- James Poe, 58, American screenwriter.
- Elkin Umbagai, 58, Australian educationalist.
- Nils Westermark, 87, Swedish Olympic sailor (1912).

=== 25 ===
- John Callagher, 81, Scottish footballer.
- Irma Hannah Gross, 87, American educator.
- Peter Haughton, 25, American harness racing driver, traffic collision.
- Amir Kumar, 56, Indian Olympic field hockey player (1948, 1956).
- David Newell, 75, American actor.
- Vincent Nolan, 43, Irish police officer.
- Albert M. Ottenheimer, 75, American actor.
- Hunter Poon, 85, Australian cricketer.
- Joseph Servella, 83, French Olympic runner (1920).
- Silvio Treleani, 73, Italian Olympic sailor (1932).
- Queenie Watts, 56, English actress, cancer.
- Frans Wildenhain, 74, German-American sculptor, cancer.

=== 26 ===
- Lavo Čermelj, 90, Slovene physicist and journalist.
- John Doherty, 80, Irish fiddler.
- James E. Gill, 79, Canadian geologist.
- Napoleon Hairston, 67, American baseball player.
- Tom Hopkins, 77, Welsh rugby player.
- Willy Huybrechts, 58, Belgian Olympic sailor (1948).
- Simon Kapwepwe, 57, Zambian politician, vice president (1967–1970).
- Georgi Karaslavov, 76, Bulgarian writer.
- Gustaf Nilsson, 80, Swedish Olympic wrestler (1920).
- Justas Paleckis, 81, Lithuanian politician and journalist, acting president (1940).
- Lynn Patrick, 67, Canadian ice hockey player and executive, heart attack.
- William Peden, 73, Canadian racing cyclist, cancer.
- Harry Hemley Plaskett, 86, Canadian astronomer.
- Cecilio Putong, 88, Filipino educator and politician.
- Juan Quintero Muñoz, 76, Spanish film composer.
- Frank Rosso, 58, American baseball player.
- Dolly Rudeman, 77, Dutch graphic designer.
- Massimo Scaligero, 73, Italian writer and occultist.
- Martin F. Scanlon, 90, American general, heart failure.

=== 27 ===
- Hans Aeschbacher, 74, Swiss sculptor.
- Paul Blanshard, 87, American author, lawyer and journalist.
- Peppino De Filippo, 76, Italian actor.
- Rudolf-Christoph von Gersdorff, 74, German general and World War II resistance member.
- Walter Jewell, 83, American football player and coach.
- Tore Ljungqvist, 74, Swedish Olympic water polo player (1936).
- Michael Mosoeu Moerane, 75, South African composer.
- Herbert J. Muller, 74, American historian.
- Francis John Nugan, 37, Australian banker and lawyer, suicide by gunshot.
- LaVern W. Parmley, 80, American Mormon leader.
- Helga Pedersen, 68, Danish judge and politician.
- Vladimir Shelkov, 84, Soviet preacher.
- Sidney Styler, 71, English cricketer.
- Stratis Tsirkas, 68, Greek poet and novelist.
- Maria Vega, 81, Soviet poet and artist.
- Omer Vermeulen, 84, Belgian racing cyclist.
- Llorenç Villalonga i Pons, 82, Spanish psychiatrist and writer.

=== 28 ===
- Kroger Babb, 73, American film producer, heart failure.
- Jimmy Crawford, 70, American jazz drummer.
- Tom Edwards, 80, American football player.
- Franco Evangelisti, 54, Italian composer.
- William Flores, 18, American Coast Guard seaman, drowned.
- Pat Griffith, 53, English racing driver.
- Erle C. Kenton, 83, American film director (Island of Lost Souls), complications from Parkinson's disease.
- Ciril Kosmač, 69, Slovenian novelist and screenwriter.
- Maxie Lambright, 55, American football coach, stroke.
- Bahman Nassim, 39, Iranian swimmer, water polo player and police officer, execution by firing squad.
- Bill O'Donnell, 68, Irish hurler.
- Antoine Rebetez, 82–83, Swiss Olympic gymnast (1924).
- James J. Saxon, 65, American banking executive and government official.
- Harry Thayer, 72, American football executive.
- Georgios Xenopoulos, 81, Greek Roman Catholic prelate.

=== 29 ===
- Ali Abdo, 51, Iranian boxer and football executive.
- Thierry Agullo, 34–35, French artist, traffic collision.
- Charlie Bates, 72, American baseball player.
- Henry Baynard, 75, American politician, member of the Florida Senate (1945–1951).
- Sir Thomas Bennett, 92, English architect.
- Bruce Bromley, 86, American lawyer and politician.
- Jimmy Durante, 86, American comedian, singer ("Inka Dinka Doo") and actor (Frosty the Snowman), pneumonia.
- Innes Finlayson, 80, New Zealand rugby player.
- Sir Edward Lewis, 79, English record producer (Decca Records).
- Gordon Manley, 78, British climatologist.
- Jessie McVey, 66, Scottish swimmer.
- Antonio Molina, 85, Filipino composer, heart failure.
- Paul J. Rogan, 61, American politician.

=== 30 ===
- Maria Bolognesi, 55, Italian Christian mystic, heart attack.
- Frank Gough, 81, Australian cricketer.
- Frank C. Hoyt, 81, American physicist.
- Ambadi Ikkavamma, 82, Indian writer, translator and educator.
- Merrill Jensen, 74, American historian.
- Francesco Lardone, 93, Italian-American Roman Catholic prelate.
- LeRoy Lutes, 89, American general.
- Alfredo Melão, 58, Portuguese footballer.
- Mary G. Phillips, 76, American nurse, stroke.
- Professor Longhair, 61, American blues musician, heart attack.
- Triloki Singh, 71, Indian politician, MP (1967–1968, since 1970).
- Warren Smith, 47, American country singer, heart attack.
- Reginald H. Sullivan, 103, American politician, mayor of Indianapolis (1930–1934, 1938–1942) and member of the Indiana Senate (1910–1914).
- Paul D. Waldorf, 72, American football and basketball coach.

=== 31 ===
- Jose Vasquez Aguilar, 79, Filipino educator and community activist.
- André Barthélémy, 83, French politician.
- Lady Evelyn Beauchamp, 78, British socialite, first woman to enter the Tomb of Tutankhamun in modern times.
- Arthur Mainwaring Bowen, 57, Welsh philanthropist.
- Eduardo Cáceres, 73, Guatemalan politician, vice president (1970–1974), fire.
- John Crabbe Cunningham, 52, Scottish mountaineer, drowned.
- Jacobus Duminy, 82, South African academic administrator and cricketer.
- Walt Ellis, 81, American football player.
- Gumercindo Gómez, 73, Bolivian footballer.
- Ed Head, 62, American baseball player.
- Phil Joslin, 63, English footballer.
- Donal McCarthy, 71, Irish hurler and academic administrator.
- Colin Pearson, Baron Pearson, 80, Canadian-born English judge.
- Les Pithie, 71, New Zealand rower.
- Charles Coleman Sellers, 76, American historian.
- Emanuel Sperner, 74, German mathematician.
- Vincent Thomas, 72, American politician, member of the California State Assembly (1941–1978).
