= Boje =

Boje is a surname. Notable people with this surname include:

- Alexandra Bøje (born 1999), Danish badminton player
- Boje Skovhus (born 1962), Danish baritone
- Boje Postel (1890–1980), German-British painter
- Christian Due-Boje (born 1966), Swedish ice hockey player
- David Boje, American professor
- Eduard Boje (born 1969), South African cricketer
- Emil Boje Jensen (1911–1964), Danish rower
- Gabriella Bøje (born 1997), Danish badminton player
- Nicky Boje (born 1973), South African cricketer
