= Pertinent (magazine) =

Leon Batt (born as Leonard Singleton Batt, Cardiff, Wales, 1902) was a leading contributor to the 1930s magazine Yesterday and Most of Today. He arrived in Australia in 1910. He also wrote under the pseudonyms of Hugh Llewellyn, Rowan McKay, Leon du Bois and E. Forrester.

== Career ==
Batt established his own monthly magazine, Pertinent in July 1940. Designed as a 'medium of expression for all who have something constructive, interesting, entertaining, and pertinent to say', the first issue included articles by Norman Lindsay, Lennie Lower and Vance Palmer taken from The Australian Writers' Annual. Later issues encouraged contributions from 'amateur' writers, but Pertinent also published contributions from Mary Finnin, Rex Ingamells, Will Lawson, Victor Kennedy and Garry Lyle. The editor declared that 'pornographic or introspective writing is not required', but some readers objected to the frequent publication of nude studies and the suggestiveness of some of the cartoons. Due to war-time paper shortages issues were sometimes late.

Contributors included Ian Mudie, Kylie Tennant, William Hart-Smith, the artist and witch Rosaleen Norton and the poet Gavin Greenlees, Dulcie Deamer (the 'Queen of Bohemia'), Yvonne Webb, George Farwell, Marjorie Quinn, Marien Dreyer, and Robert Crossland

After a three-month stoppage at the end of 1945 due to Batt's ill-health, Pete Rowe acquired the magazine and introduced a smaller format in January 1946. The magazine had a small circulation and could not manage to reach mainstream audience. The magazine continued for another year, ceasing production in May 1947.
