= Carzino =

Carzino is an Italian surname. Notable people with the surname include:

- Enrico Carzino (1897–1965), Italian footballer
- Ercole Carzino (1901–1980), Italian footballer, son of Enrico
- Luigi Carzino (1926–2010), Italian footballer
