= Willers =

Willers is a surname. Notable people with the surname include:

- Celine Willers (born 1993), German beauty pageant titleholder
- Diedrich Willers Jr. (1833–1908), American politician
- Marc Willers (born 1985), New Zealand racing cyclist
- Terry Willers (1935–2011), Irish cartoonist and animator
- Tobias Willers (born 1987), German footballer
- Uno Willers (1911–1980), Swedish historian and librarian
