= William McCoy =

William McCoy or MacCoy may refer to:

- W. F. McCoy (1886–1976), Speaker of the Northern Ireland House of Commons
- William McCoy (rum runner) (1877–1948), American rum-runner during Prohibition
- William McCoy (congressman) (died 1864), American politician and member of Congress
- William McCoy (mutineer) (c. 1763–1798), Scottish mutineer on HMS Bounty
- William McCoy (Oregon politician) (1921–1996), American politician and member of the Oregon Legislative Assembly
- William D. McCoy (1853–1893), American diplomat
- William F. MacCoy (1840–1914), lawyer and politician in Nova Scotia, Canada
- William J. McCoy (composer) (1848–1926), American composer
- William J. McCoy (Mississippi politician) (1942–2019), American politician and Speaker of the Mississippi House of Representatives
- William John McCoy (1834–1897), American politician and member of the Wisconsin State Assembly
- Willie McCoy (rapper) (died 2019), rapper
- Bill McCoy (cricketer) (1906–1980), New Zealand cricketer
