= Dave Dick (Australian footballer) =

Australian rules footballer, born 1901

Personal information
- Full name: David George Dick
- Born: 8 January 1901; Brunswick East, Victoria
- Died: 19 June 1982 (aged 81); Broadmeadows, Victoria
- Original team: Hampton Rovers
- Height: 173 cm (5 ft 8 in)
- Weight: 66 kg (146 lb)

Playing career^{1}
Years	Club	Games (Goals)
1921	St Kilda	1 (0)
1925	Essendon	3 (7)
1926	Footscray	4 (5)
Total		8 (12)
- ^{1} Playing statistics correct to the end of 1926.

David George Dick (8 January 1901 – 19 June 1982) was an Australian rules footballer who played with St Kilda, Essendon and Footscray in the Victorian Football League (VFL).

== Family ==
The second son and fifth of the nine children of Alexander Elphinstone "Alick" Dick (1866–1948), a VFA Essendon player (1888–1894), who captained the club to four premierships, and Ada Neil Dick (1865–1943), née Hardham, David George Dick was born in East Brunswick on 8 January 1901.

His older brother, Frederick John Dick, played for Melbourne. His uncle, William John "Billy" Dick played for Brighton and Brunswick in the Victorian Football Association (VFA), and Fitzroy and Carlton in the Victorian Football League (VFL).

== Football ==
Dick, a full-forward, kicked 104 goals for Hampton Rovers in 1920. The following year he joined St Kilda, where he would make a single appearance, in round 17 against Richmond.

He then returned to Hampton Rovers and remained there until 1925, when he was cleared to Essendon. In just his second game for Essendon, against Carlton at Windy Hill, Dick kicked six goals.

Dick was at a third club in 1926, Footscray, for which he played four games.

Later in the decade he played with Sandringham.

== Military service ==
He served in the Second AIF.
