= Rosaleen Norton =

New Zealand artist (1917–1979)

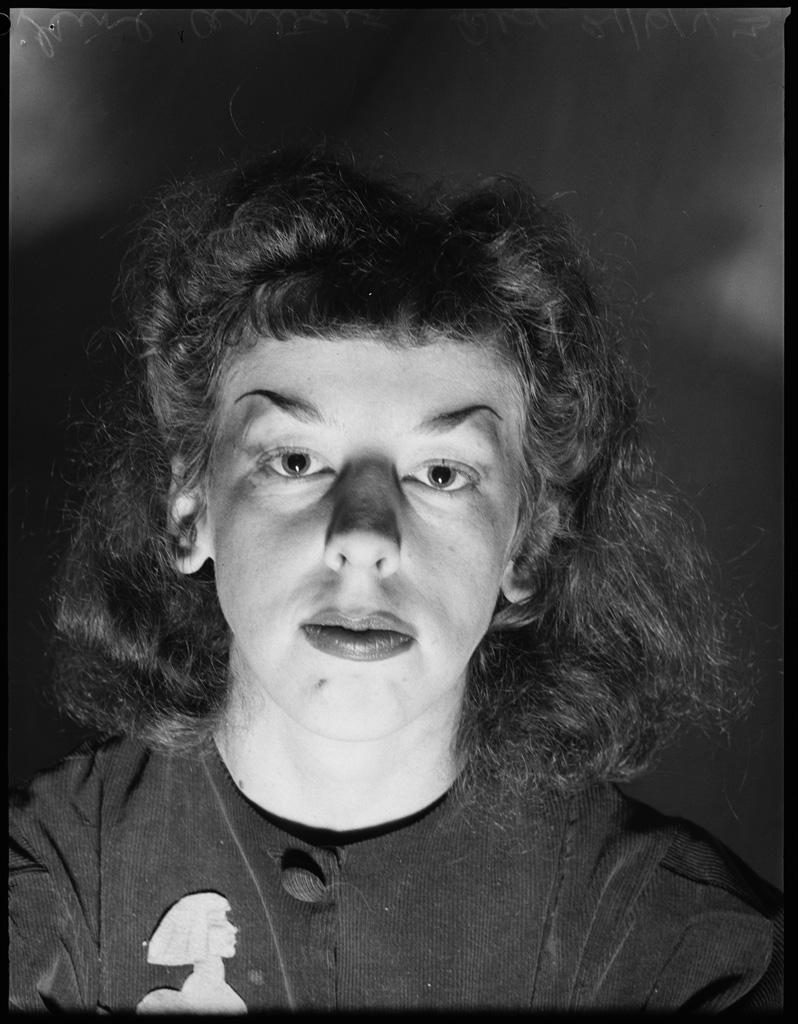
- Rosaleen Norton, Kings Cross, Sydney, 21 June 1943, by Ivan, for PIX Magazine, State Library of New South Wales
- Born: 2 October 1917; Dunedin, New Zealand
- Died: 5 December 1979 (aged 62); Sydney, Australia
- Other names: Thorn, The Witch of Kings Cross
- Occupations: Witch; Artist

Rosaleen Miriam Norton (2 October 1917 – 5 December 1979), who used the name of "Thorn", was an Australian artist and occultist, in the latter capacity adhering to a form of pantheistic / Neopagan Witchcraft largely devoted to the Greek god Pan. She lived much of her later life in the bohemian area of Kings Cross, Sydney, leading her to be termed the "Witch of Kings Cross" in some of the tabloids, and from where she led her own coven of witches.

Her paintings, which have been compared to those of British occult artist Austin Osman Spare, often depicted images of supernatural entities such as pagan gods and demons, sometimes involved in sexual acts. These caused particular controversy in Australia during the 1940s and 1950s, when the country "was both socially and politically conservative" with Christianity as the dominant faith and at a time when the government "promoted a harsh stance on censorship." For this reason the authorities dealt with her work harshly, with the police removing some of her work from exhibitions, confiscating books that contained her images, and attempting to prosecute her for public obscenity on a number of occasions.

According to her later biographer, Nevill Drury, "Norton's esoteric beliefs, cosmology and visionary art are all closely intertwined – and reflect her unique approach to the magical universe." She was inspired by "the 'night' side of magic", emphasising darkness and studying the qlippoth, alongside forms of sex magic which she had learned from the writings of English occultist Aleister Crowley.

== Biography ==
=== Early life: 1917–1934 ===
Norton was born in Dunedin, New Zealand, during a thunderstorm at about 4:30 in the morning, to an English middle class, Anglican family who had moved to the country a number of years before. She was the third of three sisters and her siblings, Cecily and Phyllis, were each over a decade older than her. In later life, she would claim that she had been born a witch, with certain biological features to mark her out as such, including pointed ears, blue markings on her left knee and a strand of flesh that hung on her body. When she herself was eight, in June 1925, her family emigrated to Sydney. There they settled in Wolseley Street, in the wealthy northern suburb of Lindfield.

As a child, Rosaleen never liked being conventional, and disliked most other children, as well as authority figures, including her mother Beena, with whom her relationship was very strained. Her father Albert, who was a sailor, was regularly away from home, although provided enough of an income so that the Nortons were able to live comfortably. Nonetheless, she would later describe her life at this time as being "a generally wearisome period of senseless shibboleths, prying adults, detestable or depressing children whom I was supposed to like, and parental reproaches." Due to this, she kept to herself, sleeping not in the house, but in a tent which she pitched in the garden for three years, and kept a pet spider at the entrance which she named Horatius, as well as other pets including cats, lizards, tortoises, toads, dogs and a goat.

Norton was enrolled at a Church of England girls' school, where she was eventually expelled for being disruptive and drawing images of demons, vampires and other such beings which the teachers claimed had a corrupting influence on other pupils. She subsequently began attending East Sydney Technical College, studying art under the sculptor Rayner Hoff, a man who encouraged her artistic talent and whom she greatly admired.

=== Early career: 1935–1948 ===
Fohat, one of Norton's most controversial images, displaying a demon with a serpentine phallus. Describing this work, she stated that "The goat is the symbol of energy and creativity: the serpent of elemental force and eternity."

Following her art college studies, Norton set herself up to become a professional writer, with the newspaper Smith's Weekly publishing a number of her horror stories in 1934, when she was sixteen, after which they gave her the job as a cadet journalist and then as an illustrator. However, her graphic illustrations were deemed too controversial, and she lost her job at the paper. Leaving Smith's Weekly, Norton moved out of her family home following the death of her mother, and sought employment as an artists' model, working for such painters as Norman Lindsay. To supplement this income, she also took up other forms of work, including as a hospital's kitchen maid, a waitress and a toy designer. Meanwhile, she had taken up a room in the Ship and Mermaid Inn, which overlooked Circular Quay, Sydney, where she began reading various books on the subject of the Western Esoteric Tradition, including those on demonology, the Qabalah and comparative religion.

In 1935, Rosaleen met a man named Beresford Lionel Conroy and they married on 14 December 1940, before going on a hitch-hiking trip across Australia, from Sydney to Melbourne, and on through to Brisbane and Cairns. Returning to Sydney, Conroy enlisted as a commando and went off to serve in New Guinea during the Second World War, and upon his return, Norton, who had been forced to live in a stable during this period, demanded a divorce, which was finally settled in 1951. During their marriage, the couple lived at 46 Bayswater Road, Kings Cross in 1943.

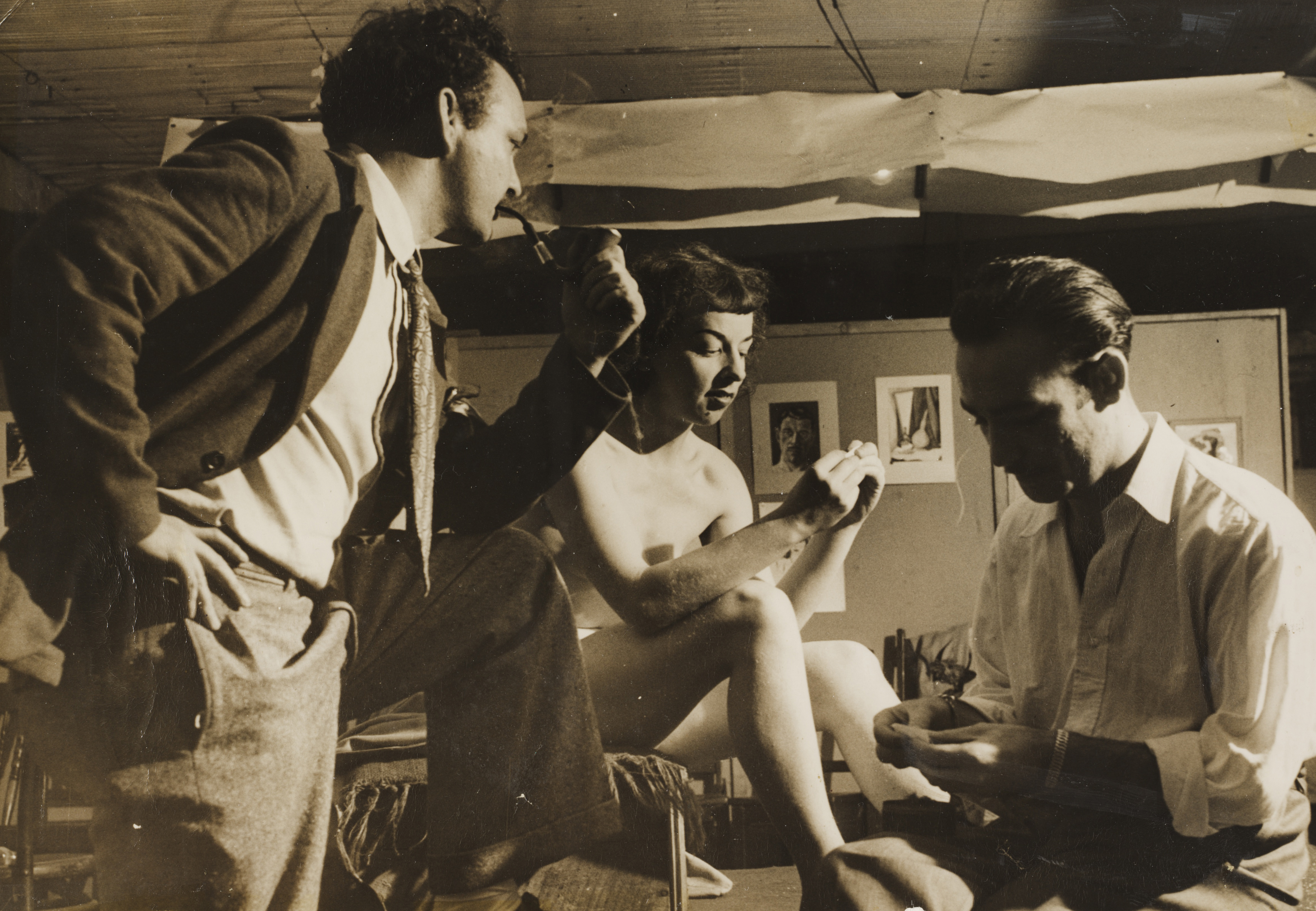
Rosaleen Norton modelling at Sydney's Studio of Realist Art (SORA), 1948, by Ted Hood

Now single once more, Norton took up residence in a boarding house known as the Merangaroo in the Rocks area, which she enjoyed for its "eccentric, communal living." She began looking for illustration work once more, being employed by a monthly free-thinking magazine known as Pertinent, which had been founded in 1940 and which was edited by the poet Leon Batt. Batt admired Norton's work, which was being increasingly influenced by pagan themes, describing her as "an artist worthy of comparison with some of the best Continental, American and English contemporaries." Norton contributed poetry and a cover illustration to Batt's anthology Not for Fools: A Collection of Pertinent Verse (1941). In 1943 Norton exhibited her work with fellow artist Selina Muller in Sydney. Her work at this period was covered in a PIX magazine article in which she described how her paintings were 'psychic experiments' which drew heavily on her unconscious.

=== Gavin Greenlees and the Melbourne exhibition: 1949–1950 ===
It was at Pertinent that she met a younger man named Gavin Greenlees (1930–1983). Greenlees had grown up in a middle-class family where he had developed an early interest in surrealism, and had become a relatively successful poet, having his work published in such newspapers as ABC Weekly and Australia Monthly. By mid-1949, the two had become good friends, and hitchhiked together to Melbourne, searching for a venue where Norton could hold an exhibition of her art. They settled on the University of Melbourne's Rowden White Library, where forty-six of her paintings, including Timeless Worlds, Merlin, Lucifer and The Initiate were put on public exhibition. However, the exhibition did not go well, and only two days after it had opened, police officers had surveyed the gallery and removed four paintings – Witches' Sabbath, Lucifer, Triumph and Individuation – which they deemed to be obscene. Norton was subsequently charged under the Police Offences Act of 1928. At the court case, held in Melbourne's Carlton Court, she was defended by A.L. Abrahams, who argued that the images in the recently published The History of Sexual Magic, a book that the Australian censors permitted, were of a far more obscene nature than Norton's paintings. She won the case, and was awarded £4/4/- in compensation from the police department.

=== Kings Cross and Walter Glover: 1951–1954 ===
With the legal hassle in Melbourne over, Norton and Greenlees, who had become lovers, returned to Sydney, where they moved into the house at 179 Brougham Street. This was in the area known as Kings Cross, which at the time was renowned for being a red light district and for people living bohemian lifestyles, particularly artists, writers and poets. Here Norton associated with many of the locals, including Dulcie Deamer, the "Queen of Bohemia", whose book of poetry, The Silver Branch, included one of Norton's pictures. Several of the local cafes in the area, such as the Arabian, the Apollyon and the Kashmir, displayed some of her artworks, and she became a relatively well known figure in Kings Cross.

Norton's The Seance.

Increasingly, many curious visitors came to see Norton and Greenlees at their home, which she had decorated with her own occult murals and a placard on the door stating "Welcome to the house of ghosts, goblins, werewolves, vampires, witches, wizards and poltergeists." The couple, widely seen as local eccentrics, even befriended several sympathetic police officers, although many in the police force disapproved of their activities, and searched for criminal charges that could be levelled at them. In September 1951, they arrested Norton and Greenlees, accusing them of vagrancy (an accusation that could be levelled at anyone without a steady job, whether or not they were actually committing vagrancy). However, publisher Walter Glover came to their aid, offering them employment as his assistants. After seeing examples of the pair's work, he decided to publish a book containing a combination of Norton's artwork and Greenlees' poetry.

The result was published as The Art of Rosaleen Norton in 1952, and contained such paintings as Black Magic, Rites of Baron Samedi and an image depicting the horned demon Fohat, with a snake for his phallus, whilst Greenlees' poems featured in the work included The Angel of Twizzari and Esoteric Study. Restricted to a limited edition of 500 copies, The Art of Rosaleen Norton had been produced to a high quality, with each edition being bound in red leather with gold blocking, illustrated endpapers, and ribbon marker. It contained 31 black-and-white reproductions of artworks by Norton (29 of which were full-page or near full-page plates). This work was banned in New South Wales on the grounds of obscenity, and subsequently its import into the US was forbidden. The publisher, Walter Glover, had intended an edition of 1000 copies (so stated in the book), 650 to be bound in cloth (ordinary edition) and 350 in leather (the edition deluxe), with the first 20 copies of the leather edition to include a colour artwork by Norton. Only a small number – probably less than 20 – were issued in leather due to the prohibitive cost and it is also certain that far fewer than the intended 650 copies were bound in cloth, although the exact number that were distributed is unknown. Copies numbered up to 505 are known to exist.

After the book's release, Glover was charged by police with the production of an obscene publication, and Norton was called into court to explain her artwork. The judge ruled that two of the images in the book, The Adversary and Fohat, did qualify as being obscene under Australian law, and that they had to be removed from all existing copies of the book. Glover "blacked out" the two "obscene" plates in a few copies, but most were unaltered. The authorities in the United States were even stricter, with customs actively destroying any copies of the book that were imported into their country. The controversy had helped gain publicity for Norton's work, but left Glover bankrupted. Alan Cross, the book's binder, realizing that he would never get paid, was instead given his choice of Norton work, of which he chose Fohat.

=== Tabloid sensationalism and Sir Eugene Goossens: 1955–1959 ===
In 1955, a mentally ill adolescent vagrant named Anna Karina Hoffman swore at a police officer, and was subsequently charged, but at her trial claimed that her life had fallen apart after taking part in a Satanic Black Mass run by Rosaleen Norton, a claim which was picked up in by the sensationalist tabloids. Norton, who did not consider herself to be a Satanist but a pagan, denied these claims, and Hoffman later admitted that she had made them up. However, by this time, the press had published stories accusing Norton of being a devil worshipper and even engaging in animal sacrifice, a practice which Norton abhorred.

With this public outcry against her work, the police once more began to act against her and those who supported her. In 1955, they successfully took the proprietor of a local restaurant, the Kashmir, to court, for displaying some of her works publicly. That same year, the police raided Norton and Greenlees' home, and accused them of performing "an unnatural sexual act", evidence for which they had obtained in a photograph displaying Greenlees in ritual garb flagellating Norton's buttocks. It was subsequently revealed that the photos had been taken at Norton's birthday party, and stolen by two members of their coven, Francis Honer and Raymond Ager, who planned to sell it to The Sun newspaper for £200.

Meanwhile, the successful English classical music composer and conductor Sir Eugene Goossens (1893–1962), who was then in Australia and who had an interest in the occult, read a copy of The Art of Rosaleen Norton and decided to write to the artist herself. She invited him to meet her, and the two, alongside Gavin Greenlees, became friends and lovers. In March 1956, Goossens was arrested attempting to bring 800 erotic photographs, some film and ritual masks into Australia from London, and was charged under Section 233 of the Customs Act. In court, he pleaded guilty to bringing "blasphemous, indecent or obscene works" into the country and was fined £100. He resigned his positions at both the Sydney Symphony Orchestra and New South Wales Conservatorium of Music and returned to Britain, his international career ending in disgrace. Norton's relationship with Goossens ended.

Soon the life that Norton had with Greenlees also collapsed, as he was admitted to Callan Park Hospital in 1955. In 1957 he was diagnosed with schizophrenia. Norton continued to visit and support him through his temporary release in 1964 and afterward, but Greenlees was re-admitted after attempting to kill Norton with a knife during a schizophrenic episode. He was discharged permanently in 1983, approximately four years after her death.

=== Later life: 1960–1979 ===
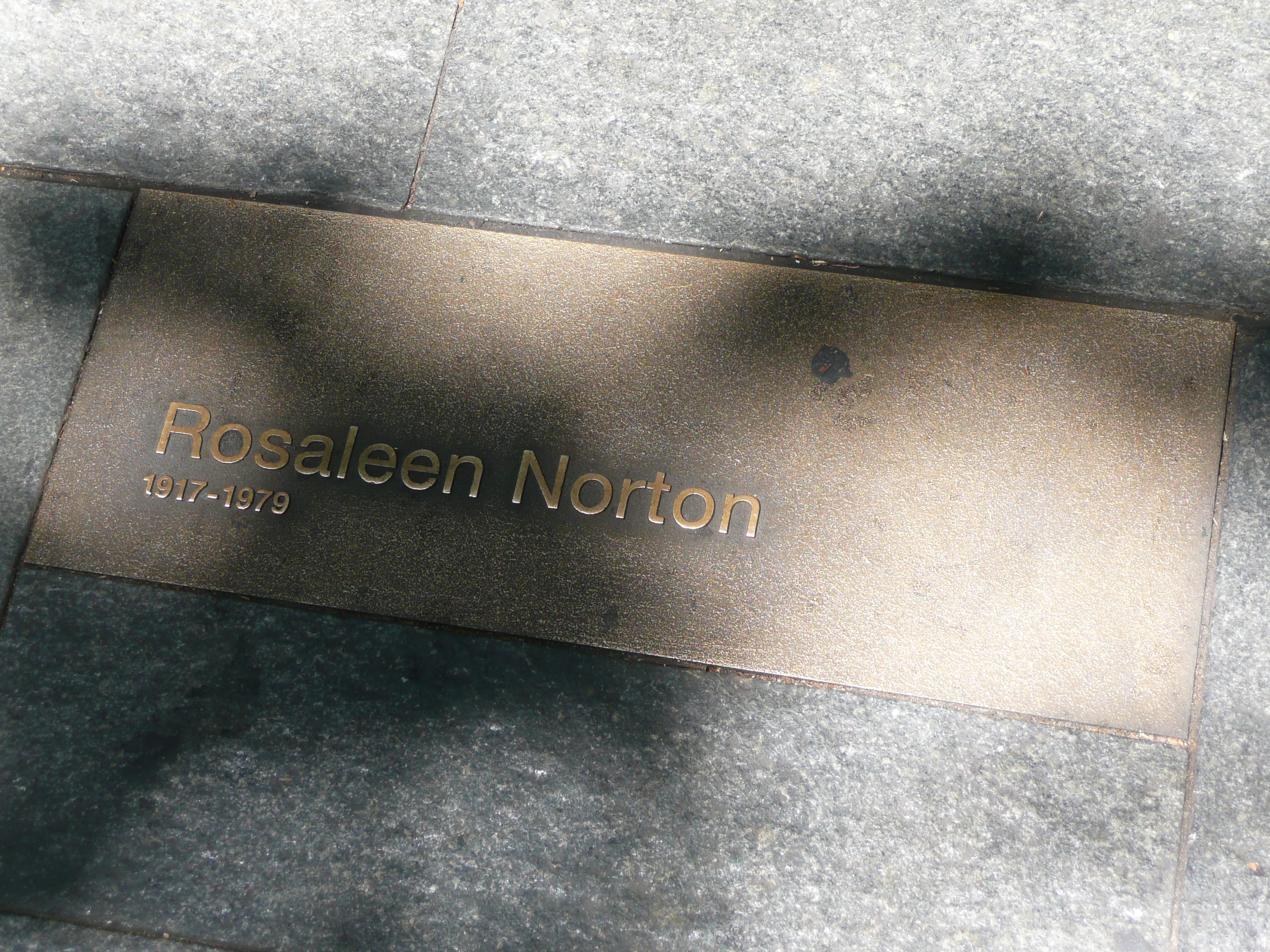
Rosaleen Norton plaque, Darlinghurst Road, Kings Cross

The tabloid attention surrounding Norton had intensified in the late 1950s, leading tourists to come into the area in search of her. Despite the fact that at the time witchcraft was still illegal in New South Wales (the British Witchcraft Act 1735 had been repealed in England in 1951, but would not be repealed in New South Wales until 1971), Norton openly declared herself to be a witch. She tried to explain her beliefs to interviewers, emphasizing her faith in pantheism. Along with selling her paintings, she was using witchcraft to supplement her income by making charms and casting hexes for people.

Norton temporarily moved into her sister Cecily's flat in Kirribilli, one of the few family members Rosaleen got along with. But in 1967, Rosaleen moved back to Kings Cross, taking up residence in a derelict house in Bourke Street, Darlinghurst. She later moved into a ground floor apartment in Whitby flats in the Roslyn Gardens area, Elizabeth Bay, accompanied by her pets. Here, Norton began to live a more reclusive and private existence, avoiding the media attention of previous decades.

Norton was a worshipper of Pan until her death in 1979; she died from colon cancer at the Sacred Heart Hospice for the Dying, in Darlinghurst, Sydney. Shortly before she died she is reported as saying: "I came into the world bravely; I'll go out bravely." A plaque dedicated to her has since been installed in Darlinghurst Road, Kings Cross.

== Legacy ==
Following her death, Norton's many paintings, which were owned by Don Deaton, a local printer and pub owner, were sold at auction to a single collector, Jack Parker, for £5000, who displayed them at his Southern Cross Hotel in St Peters, Sydney.

Meanwhile, Walter Glover gained the rights to republish The Art of Rosaleen Norton, re-releasing it in a facsimile edition in 1982 with a new introduction by Nevill Drury and four colour plates that did not appear in the first edition. There was an 'edition deluxe' of the 1982 reprint, housed in an ivory slipcase and signed by the publisher; approximately 50 copies of this were printed. Following this, in 1984, he published A Supplement to the Art of Rosaleen Norton, which contained colour prints of nineteen of the works which had been featured in her 1949 Melbourne exhibition.

In December 1982, a play opened at the Tom Mann Theatre in Sydney entitled Rosaleen – Wicked Witch of the Cross, by Barry Lowe. It starred Jane Parker as Norton, Peter Laurence as Glover, Christopher Lyons as Greenlees and Alan Archer as Pan, and was attended by both Wally Glover and Gavin Greenlees themselves. However, according to Nevill Drury, who was invited to the show by Glover, "the play itself had most of the weaknesses of an amateur production – it was unconvincingly acted and was not acclaimed a critical success."

In 1988, the anthropologist Nevill Drury, who had published books on the subject of witchcraft and magic, released a biography of Norton entitled Pan's Daughter: The Strange World of Rosaleen Norton. This volume was subsequently re-released under the title The Witch of Kings Cross. He later "substantially expanded and reworked" this into a new book titled Homage to Pan: The Life, Art and Sex-Magic of Rosaleen Norton, which was published in 2009. Drury had himself met her only on one occasion, at her apartment in 1977, at a time when she had become somewhat of a recluse.

In 2000, an exhibition of Norton's paintings was held in Kings Cross, Sydney, organised by various enthusiasts including Keith Richmond, and Barry William Hale of the Australian Ordo Templi Orientis. A full-colour catalogue, The Occult Visions of Rosaleen Norton was published to accompany this exhibition.

In 2009, Teitan Press published Thorn in the Flesh: A Grim-memoir by Norton, with an introduction by Australian Norton scholar Keith Richmond. The volume comprises (often humorous) poetry, reminiscences, and various occult jottings by Rosaleen Norton, with reproductions of two photographs of Norton, as well as some half-a-dozen examples of her art, mainly in colour.

In 2012 Norton's work was included in the major exhibition "Windows to the Sacred", which was curated by Robert Buratti and toured Australian museums until 2016. The exhibition drew together drawings and paintings alongside work by Aleister Crowley, Austin Osman Spare, surrealist James Gleeson and many others.

In 2017 an exhibition of Norton's artwork, curated by Robert Buratti and Aaron Lister, was exhibited as part of "Occulture: The Dark Arts" at City Gallery in Wellington, New Zealand. This was the first major showing of the artist in her country of birth.

Several filmmakers have expressed interest in making films about Norton's life. In a 1993 interview given to Black and White magazine, Kenneth Anger said that he was putting finishing touches to a film treatment he had written about Norton's life, but the film was never realised. In addition, Australian filmmaker Sonia Bible worked on a documentary about Norton, featuring interviews with many living people who knew Norton. This documentary, titled The Witch of Kings Cross, was released in 2021 via Amazon, iTunes, Vimeo, GooglePlay, and in selected theatres.

== Personal life ==
Although her two main sexual relationships in her life were with men (Gavin Greenlees and Sir Eugene Goossens), Norton was bisexual, and allegedly enjoyed all forms of sexual activity with both men and women, including bondage and sado-masochism. She was also known to enjoy sexual intercourse with gay men, believing that in such situations she could play the active role. She also actively engaged in sex magic among her coven, having learned much about it from the writings of Aleister Crowley and from Goossens, who himself had been very much interested in Crowley's work.

=== Religious beliefs ===
Norton devised her own variety of neopagan witchcraft, establishing a Wicca tradition that, according to English witch Doreen Valiente, became known as "The Goat Fold".

== Selected publications ==
- The Art of Rosaleen Norton with poems by Gavin Greenlees. Walter Glover, Sydney. 1952. 2nd edition: Walter Glover, Bondi Beach. 1982. ISBN 0-9593077-0-2. US edition: The Teitan Press, 2013 (with new introduction by Keith Richmond).
- Supplement to: The Art of Rosaleen Norton (1982 Edition) with poems by Gavin Greenlees. Walter Glover, Bondi Beach, N.S.W. 1984. ISBN 0-9593077-1-0.
- Three Macabre Stories (US: Typographeum Press, 1996; revised edition: US: Teitan Press, 2010). Three rare Lovecraftian stories originally published by Norton in the periodical Smith's Weekly. (The Teitan Press 2010 edition includes additional material and reprints three satirical illustrations by Norton originally published in Smith's Weekly.)
- Thorn in the Flesh: A Grim-Memoire (US: Teitan Press, 2009). ISBN 978-0-933429-16-1 Limited to 880 numbered copies. Poetry, magical writings and miscellanea. Note: The first 300 copies (only) of this publication included a CD of some readings by Norton, made from reel-to-reel tapes recorded by Norton.
