= Gavin Greenlees =

Australian poet

Gavin Greenlees (15 April 1930 – 5 December 1983) was an Australian poet. He was born in Melbourne, Victoria, but later spent most of his time in Sydney, where he became known as a bohemian figure.

== Life ==
As early as 1943, Greenlees had poems published in the periodical Pertinent. He won three successive poetry competitions sponsored by the Australian Broadcasting Corporation and his poems later were widely published, notably in the 'Australian Weekend Book'. He experimented with Surrealism and studied Freud, Lautreamont, Rimbaud and James Joyce for several years. In 1949 he began studying Jung, Dostoyevsky and Ouspensky and the works of Aleister Crowley and the Hermetic Order of the Golden Dawn.

Greenlees became the lover of the occultist and artist Rosaleen Norton, almost thirteen years his senior, and they published together The Art of Rosaleen Norton. The sexually explicit nature of some of the artwork, led to the publisher being charged with producing an obscene publication, and continued distribution within Australia was only permitted if some of the offending images were obliterated with black ink. U.S.A. customs officers burned imported copies.

From 1955 onwards, Greenlees had many prolonged admissions to psychiatric hospitals in Sydney suffering from hallucinations and paranoia, possibly made worse by his regular use of drugs including amphetamines and LSD. He died aged 53, on 5 December 1983.
