= Nevill Drury =

Australian editor and publisher (1947–2013)

- Born: 1 October 1947; Hastings, England, UK
- Died: 15 October 2013 (aged 66); New South Wales, Australia
- Education: Sydney University (BA), Macquarie University (MA), University of Newcastle (PhD)
- Occupation: Pagan studies scholar

Nevill Drury (1 October 1947 – 15 October 2013) was an English and Australian editor and publisher, as well as the author of over 40 books on subjects ranging from shamanism and western magical traditions to art, music, and anthropology. His books have been published in 26 countries and in 19 languages.

== Early life ==
Born in Hastings, England in 1947, Drury moved to Australia at the age of nine. He attended Sydney University in the late 1960s and later earned his Master of Arts (honours) degree in anthropology from Macquarie University. He received his PhD from the School of Humanities and Social Research, University of Newcastle in 2008 for a dissertation on the visionary art and magical beliefs of Rosaleen Norton.

== Career ==
In 1970, Drury was an English teacher at West Wyalong High School in the Riverina District of NSW. In 1976, he began working in the Australian book industry. He was a former managing editor for the holistic journal Nature and Health. A former managing editor for Harper and Row and Doubleday in Australia, he helped found the specialist visual arts publishing company Craftsman House in 1981, which became Australia's leading art book imprint.

Drury worked full-time as publishing director of this company from 1989 to January 2000. He also co-edited Australian Painting Now, which was published in the UK and US by Thames & Hudson. He was briefly the manager of Adyar Bookshop in Sydney (2008-2012).

=== Writing and lecturing ===
Drury was a prolific author of books on shamanism, spirituality, and different forms of magical practice. His many books include the first serious overview of occultism in Australia: Other Temples, Other Gods (co-written with Gregory Tillet). Others include Don Juan, Mescalito and Modern Magic, The Occult Experience (the book of an award-winning documentary he co-produced and narrated released in 1985 featuring, among others, Margot Adler, Selena Fox, Alex Sanders, Janet and Stewart Farrar, and H. R. Giger), and Pan's Daughter: the first biography of Australian artist and witch Rosaleen Norton.

He authored several books on Australian art, including the three-volume Images series. Artist Matthew Tobin (Creative Director, Urban Arts Projects ) described Drury as

...one of those most responsible for Aboriginal art's growth (he discovered Rover Thomas, Clifford Possum and Emily Kame Kngwarreye)

His books have been translated into 19 languages. Since 1980 he was a speaker and workshop facilitator on subjects such as magical visualization and shamanic drumming. He was both an interviewer and a guest on several programs on Australian television, including the ABC Television shows The Ark and Compass, as a spokesperson for the New Spirituality. He has also lectured at the University of Queensland, Australia.

== Awards ==
- Bronze Award for documentary The Occult Experience at the 1985 International Film and Television Festival of New York
- Silver Award in ForeWord Magazine's Book of the Year Awards, New York (2004) for The New Age : Searching for the Spiritual Self (In the USA: The New Age: The History of a Movement) Thames & Hudson UK / Thames & Hudson Inc. Category: "Mind Body Spirit".
- Best PhD in the School of Humanities, University of Newcastle 2008
- Most Significant Publication Arising from a Research PhD, (chapter on the 'Modern Magical Revival' published in M. Pizza and J.R. Lewis [ed], Handbook of Contemporary Paganism, Brill, Leiden 2009), University of Newcastle 2008

== Personal life ==
Nevill married three times – to Susan Pinchin (their three children being: Rebecca, Megan and Ben), to writer Anna Voigt, and to Lesley Andrews-Buffard. From 2008 onwards he lived in and around the small rural town of Milton, on the New South Wales south coast. In retirement his interests included drawing in pastels, gardening, lecturing for the U3A organization, learning how to play slide guitar on a dobro, and singing in a local gospel choir.

== Death ==
Drury suffered various cancers and complications and was found to have advanced liver failure. He died at home on 15 October 2013 aged 66. He was survived by his wife Lesley, his three children, Rebecca, Megan and Ben, and his grandchildren Jethro, Isabella, Madeleine, Archie and Zara.

== Bibliography ==
- Australian Painting Now (with Laura Murray Cree) (2000)
- Bodywork Book (1984)
- Creating Good Karma: Release Your Karmic Burdens and Change Your Life (2003)
- Creative Visualization - To Attain Your Goals and Improve Your Well-Being (2001)
- Dark Spirits: The Magical Art of Rosaleen Norton and Austin Osman Spare (2012) Salamander & Sons ISBN 9780980409987
- Dictionary of Mysticism and the Esoteric Traditions (1992) ABC Clio, (1992) Prism Press, (1994) Ferenczy Konyvkiado, (2002) Watkins (republication of Dictionary of Mysticism and the Occult) ISBN 0-87436-699-2
- Dictionary of Mysticism and the Occult (1985) Harper & Row ISBN 0-06-062093-5, (1988) Droemer Knaur
- The Dictionary of the Esoteric: Over 3,000 Entries on the Mystical and Occult Traditions (2002) Simon & Schuster (Australia) Pty Ltd ISBN 1-84293-041-9, Sterling Publishing Company, Inc. ISBN 1-84293-108-3
- Don Juan, Mescalito and Modern Magic: The Mythology of Inner Space (1988) Arkana, Penguin (Non-Classics) (1 November 1988) ISBN 0-14-019016-3, ISBN 978-0-14-019016-8
- Echoes From the Void: Writings on Magic, Visionary Art and the New Consciousness (1994)
- The Elements of Human Potential (1989) Element, (1993) Edizione Crisalide, (1994) Xenia, (1995) Zysk, (1996) Votobia
- The Elements of Shamanism (1989) Element, (1991) Tirion, (1991) Jouvence, (1994) Karisto Oy, (1994) Edesviz Kiado, (1994) Rebis, (1995) Xenia, (1996) Forum, (1996) Okyanus, (1997) Floros (republished 2000 by Element as New Perspectives: Shamanism)
- Everyday Magic (9 April 2002) Simon & Schuster, Australia ISBN 0-7432-2919-3
- Exploring the Labyrinth: Making Sense of the New Spirituality (1999) Continuum, 1999 Allen & Unwin (Sydney), 1999 Gill & Macmillan / Newleaf ISBN 1-86448-644-9
- Fire & Shadow: Spirituality in Contemporary Australian Art (with Anna Voigt) (1996)
- The Gods of Rebirth (1988)
- Healing Music: The Harmonic Path to Inner Wholeness (with Andrew Watson) (1987)
- The Healing Power: A Handbook of Alternative Medicine and Natural Health (1981)
- The History of Magic in the Modern Age (2000) Carroll & Graf, 2000 Constable, 2000 Simon & Schuster Australia
- The Illustrated Dictionary of Natural Health (with Susan Drury) (1988) David & Charles ISBN 0-7153-9313-8
- Images in Contemporary Australian Painting (1992)
- Images 2: Contemporary Australian Painting (1995)
- Images 3: Contemporary Australian Painting (1998)
- Inner Health: The Health Benefits of Relaxation, Meditation and Visualization (1985)
- Inner Visions: Explorations in Magical Consciousness (1995) Arkana, (1995) Penguin Group (US) Incorporated ISBN 0-14-019283-2
- Magic and Witchcraft: From Shamanism to the Technopagans (2004)
- Merlin's Book of Magick and Enchantment (with Linda Garland) (2001) Barnes and Noble, (1997) Lansdowne, (1998) Raincoast, (2002) Edaf
- The New Age: The History of a Movement (2004)
- New Art (1990)
- New Art One (1987)
- New Art Two: New Directions in Contemporary Australian Art (1980)
- New Art Four: Profiles in Contemporary Australian Art (1990)
- New Art 5: Profiles in Contemporary Australian Art (1991)
- New Art Six: Profiles in Contemporary Australian Art (1992)
- New Art Seven (1992)
- New Art Eight: Profiles in Contemporary Australian Art (1993)
- New Perspectives: Shamanism (2000)
- New Sculpture: Profiles in Contemporary Australian Sculpture (1994)
- Occult Experience (1989)
- The Occult Sourcebook (with Gregory Tillett) (1978) Routledge & K. Paul ISBN 0-7100-8875-2
- Other Temples, Other Gods: the Occult in Australia (1980)
- Pan's Daughter: the Strange World of Rosaleen Norton (1988)
- The Path of the Chameleon: Man's Encounter with the Gods and Magic (1973)
- Reincarnation: Exploring the Concept of Reincarnation in Religion, Philosophy and Traditional Cultures (2002) Barnes & Noble, New York ISBN 0-7607-3234-5
- Sacred Encounters: Shamanism and Magical Journeys of the Spirit (2003)
- The Search for Abraxas (with Stephen Skinner, Introduction by Colin Wilson) (1972)
- The Shaman and the Magician: Journeys Between the Worlds (1988) Arkana, Penguin (Non-Classics); New Ed edition (1 November 1988) ISBN 0-14-019056-2, ISBN 978-0-14-019056-4
- The Shaman's Quest: Journeys in an Ancient Spiritual Practice (with Tom Cowan) (2002)
- Stealing Fire From Heaven: The Rise of Modern Western Magic (February 2011) New York: Oxford University Press ISBN 0-19-975100-5
- The Tarot Workbook: A Step-by-Step Guide to Discovering the Wisdom of the Cards (Divination and Energy Workbooks) (2004)
- Vision Quest: A Personal Journey Through Magic and Shamanism (1989)
- The Visionary Human: Mystical Consciousness and Paranormal Perspectives (1991)
- The Watkins Dictionary of Magic: Over 3,000 Entries on the World of Magical Formulas, Secret Symbols, and the Occult (28 July 2006) Watkins ISBN 1-84293-152-0, ISBN 978-1-84293-152-3
- A Way Forward: Spiritual Guidance for Our Troubled Times (with Anna Voigt) (2003)
- Wisdom from the Earth: the Living Legacy of the Aboriginal Dreamtime (with Anna Voigt) (1998) Shambhala, (1997) Simon & Schuster Australia, (1998) Droemer / Delphi (Germany)

== Filmography ==
- Healers, Quacks or Mystics? (1983) ABC TV Series
- The Occult Experience (1985) Sony Home Video (won a Bronze Award at the 1985 International Film and Television Festival of New York)

== Discography ==
- Shaman Journey by Nevill Drury & Japetus (CD) (Released 18 November 2005) Japetus
