= Pierre Molinier =

French painter and photographer (1900–1976)

- Molinier, date unknown
- Born: 13 April 1900; Agen, France
- Died: 3 March 1976 (aged 75); Bordeaux, France
- Known for: Painting, photography
- Notable work: Cent photographies érotiques; Le chaman et ses créatures
- Movement: Surrealism
- Spouse: Andrea Lafaye (m. 1931)
- Children: 2

Pierre Molinier (13 April 1900 – 3 March 1976) was a French painter, photographer and "maker of objects". He joined the Surrealist movement in 1955 through André Breton and became known for erotic imagery drawing on sexuality, fetishism, and religious ritual. In the final decade of his life, he made photomontages in which he appeared as a transvestite figure, combining his body with mannequins.

== Early life and education ==
Pierre Molinier was born in Agen, France, and spent most of his life in Bordeaux. He began his artistic career as a landscape painter and took up photography at the age of 18. Before this, he had apprenticed with his father and with Pierre Augustin de Fumadelles, a sculptor.

Following his military service from 1921 to 1922, Molinier traveled to Paris to study and copy masterworks. In Paris, Molinier reportedly avoided overexposure to major works of art, regarding it as part of a personal philosophy on "how to create a work of art."

Molinier's interests in esotericism developed after World War I, when he joined a masonic order known as the Brotherhood. During this period, he became fascinated with ancient Egyptian and Indian religions, as well as Satanism.

== Career ==
=== Surrealist period ===
Molinier's work moved from landscape painting to erotic imagery with fetishistic themes. In 1955, he made contact with leading surrealist André Breton and sent him photographs of his paintings. He was subsequently brought into the Surrealist group, and by 1959 his work was included in the International Surrealist Exhibition. The Surrealists described the purpose of his art as "for my own stimulation", a sentiment later reflected in a provocative contribution to the 1965 exhibition: a dildo.

=== Photographic work ===
La Poupée et jambes devant le paravent, photomontage, c. 1960s

Between 1965 and his death in 1976, Molinier worked on transgressive and transsexual themes in the photo series Cent photographies érotiques. These black-and-white images often depicted scenes of pain and pleasure, and featured Molinier himself, either with female models or lifelike mannequins. Using a remote control shutter, he posed as a transvestite figure dressed in fishnet stockings, suspender belts, stiletto heels, masks, and corsets. Many compositions used photomontage to combine limbs and bodies into surreal forms.

During the final 11 years of his life, Molinier staged many of his most intimate and provocative works in the "theatre" of his Bordeaux boudoir–atelier. He intended these photographs to shock, and wanted viewers to respond with either excitement or disgust.

=== Artistic philosophy ===
He stated that his erotic work was created for personal stimulation: "In painting, I was able to satisfy my leg and nipple fetishism." He claimed that his sexual attraction focused not on gender but on specific features, especially hairless legs in black stockings. Regarding his use of dolls, Molinier remarked: "While a doll can function as a substitute for a woman, there is no movement, no life. This has a certain charm if one is before a beautiful corpse. The doll can, but does not have to become the substitute for a woman."

Molinier frequently explored connections between religious ritual and sexuality, which he believed had been repressed by post-Renaissance moral codes. He styled himself as a transvestite Baudelaire who expressed his ideas through objects—corsets, masks, and chains—rather than words. He wanted to subvert conventional morality and aesthetic norms, and likened himself to a jester. He also referenced ancient shamanic traditions in his work. His experimentation with sexual transformation was, in his view, an attempt to reclaim a primordial androgynous ideal. His planned autobiography was to have been titled The Shaman and His Creatures.

== Personal life ==
Molinier married Andrea Lafaye on 7 July 1931 in Bordeaux. They had two children, a daughter and a son.

== Death ==
In the 1970s, his health began to decline. Molinier died by suicide on 3 March 1976, shooting himself in his Bordeaux apartment where he had lived for over forty years.

His epitaph reads: "Here lies Pierre Molinier. He was a man without morals."

== See also ==
- Thierry Agullo
- Hans Bellmer
