= Frank Gough =

Australian cricketer

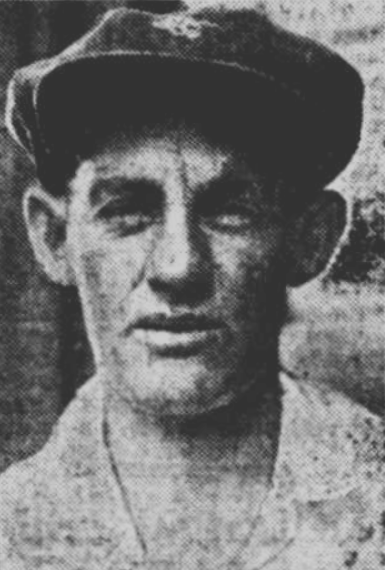

Personal information
- Full name: Francis Joseph Gough
- Born: 26 July 1898; Sandgate, Brisbane, Queensland, Australia
- Died: 30 January 1980 (aged 81); Sandgate, Brisbane, Queensland, Australia
- Batting: Right-handed
- Bowling: Right-arm leg-spin

Domestic team information
- Years: Team
- 1924-25 to 1932-33: Queensland

Career statistics
Competition	First-class
Matches	40
Runs scored	1779
Batting average	24.70
100s/50s	2/11
Top score	137
Balls bowled	1413
Wickets	10
Bowling average	92.30
5 wickets in innings	0
10 wickets in match	0
Best bowling	3/100
Catches/stumpings	23/–
- Source: Cricinfo, 18 January 2020

Francis Joseph Gough (26 July 1898 – 30 January 1980) was an Australian cricketer who played first-class cricket for Queensland from 1924 to 1933.

== Life and career ==
Frank Gough was a batsman and leg-spin bowler. In 1926–27 he played in Queensland's inaugural Sheffield Shield match, taking three wickets, including that of Archie Jackson, who was making his first-class debut. In 1927–28, he was the first bowler to dismiss Don Bradman for a duck in first-class cricket.

After 1927–28 he played for Queensland as a batsman, although he continued to bowl effectively in Brisbane Grade Cricket, where he set a record for Norths of 242 wickets, which stood until 1950–51 when it was surpassed by Bert McGinn. He made 52 and 104 when Queensland beat the touring MCC in 1929–30. His other century was the 137 he scored against New South Wales in 1930–31. He captained Queensland from 1930–31 to 1932–33.

Gough married Lottie Phillips in Sydney in April 1933. In World War II he served as a flying officer in the Royal Australian Air Force from September 1942 to December 1945.
