= Saul Hayes =

Canadian lawyer and public servant

- Born: May 28, 1906; Montreal, Quebec
- Died: January 12, 1980 (aged 73); Sainte-Adèle, Quebec
- Known for: Involvement with the Canadian Jewish Congress

Saul Hayes, OC QC (May 28, 1906 – January 12, 1980) was a Canadian lawyer and public servant in the Canadian Jewish community.

Born in Montreal, Quebec, Hayes studied at McGill University where he received a Bachelor of Arts degree in 1927, a Master of Arts degree in 1928, and a Bachelor of Civil Law degree in 1932. He was called to the Quebec Bar in 1932 and was created a King's Counsel in 1940. He was a lecturer at the School of Social Work at McGill University.

Hayes practiced law until being appointed national Executive Director of the Canadian Jewish Congress in 1940, a post he would hold until 1959. From 1959 to 1974, he was national executive vice-president. He was also executive director of the United Jewish Relief Agencies of Canada from 1938 to 1942. He had spearheaded the community's effort to have immigration restrictions relaxed during and after World War II and served on a myriad of committees, especially those devoted to human rights.

Hayes was a representative to the United Jewry Delegations, Second Conference of UNRRA in 1944, the San Francisco Conference on International Security in 1945, and the Paris Conference on Peace Treaties in 1946.

Hayes was one of the leading voices of the Canadian Jewish community in Canada and the world. He played an important a role in explaining the needs of the Jewish community. He remained active with CJC until his death in Sainte-Adèle, Quebec in 1980.

== Honours ==
Hayes was a Fellow of the Royal Society of Arts. He was awarded the Queen Elizabeth II Coronation Medal in 1953 and the Canadian Centennial Medal in 1967. In 1973, he was made an Officer of the Order of Canada "for his dedicated work in the betterment of human relations". He received honorary degrees from Sir George Williams University, which later became Concordia University, in 1970 and from McGill University in 1974.
