= Emanuel Sejr =

Danish librarian

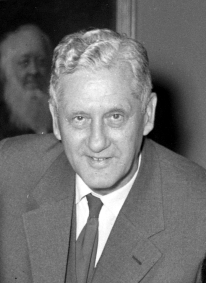
- Emanuel Sejr in 1957
- Born: 29 September 1891; Odder, Denmark
- Died: 17 January 1980 (aged 88); Aarhus, Denmark

Emanuel Sejr (Danish pronunciation: [ˈsɑjˀɐ]; 29 September 1891 – 17 January 1980) was a Danish librarian, author and local historian who was the head librarian of the Danish State and University Library. Sejr was hired by the State and University Library in 1913 and became the head librarian in 1936 to 1957. In the 1920s he played a key role in the negotiations to have the library serve double functions as both a state library and the university library for Aarhus University. He also secured development and construction of the new building ("Bogtårnet") (English: Book tower) on the university campus. During retirement Sejr dedicated himself to local history and published a number of book about local subjects such as the university, theatre and people from the city. Sejr through his life accumulated a large archive of 110,000 of mainly newspaper clippings which is still used today for historical research.

== Books ==
- Fra Smakke til Hurtigfærg – 1900
- Gamle Århusgader 1.-2 – 1900
- århus mosaik – 1967
- Århus mosaik. Personer og begivenheder i den lille by – 1967
- Århus-profiler – 1974
- Biblioteks- og kulturliv i Århus – 1977
