= Dulcie Deamer =

New Zealand-born Australian-based writer

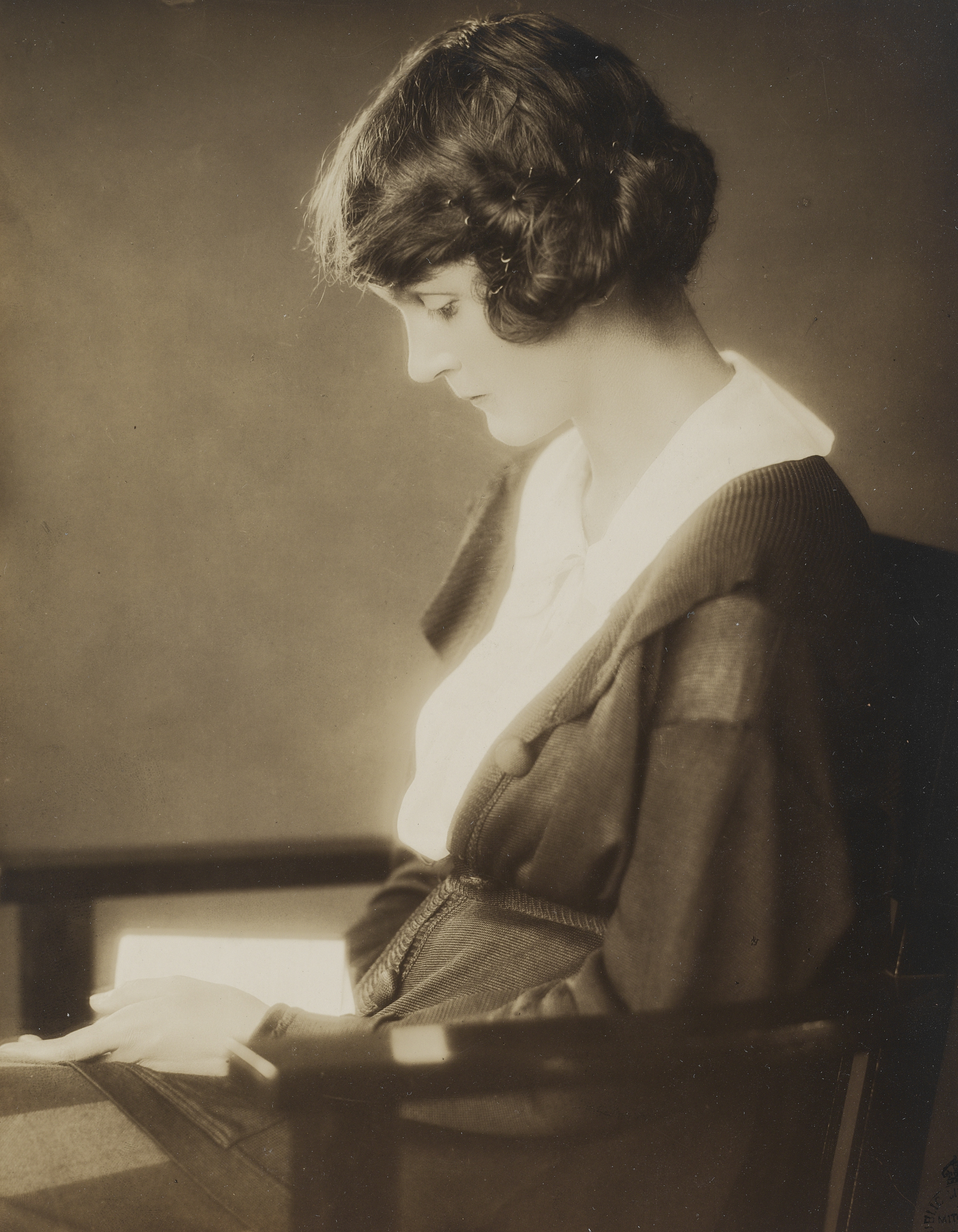
- Portrait photo (1920s)
- Born: Mary Elizabeth Kathleen Dulcie Deamer; 13 December 1890; Christchurch, New Zealand
- Died: 16 August 1972 (aged 81); Randwick, New South Wales, Australia
- Occupations: Novelist; poet; journalist; actress
- Known for: founder of the Fellowship of Australian Writers

Mary Elizabeth Kathleen Dulcie Deamer (13 December 1890 – 16 August 1972) was a New Zealand-born Australian novelist, poet, journalist, and actress. She was a founder and committee member of the Fellowship of Australian Writers.

== Life ==
Deamer was born in Christchurch, New Zealand, daughter of George Edwin Deamer, a physician from Lincolnshire, and his New Zealand-born wife, Mable Reader. She was taught at home by her mother, who had been a governess. She married Albert Goldie, a theatrical agent, in Perth, Australia, on 27 August 1908. She bore six children, but separated from Goldie in 1922.

== Career ==
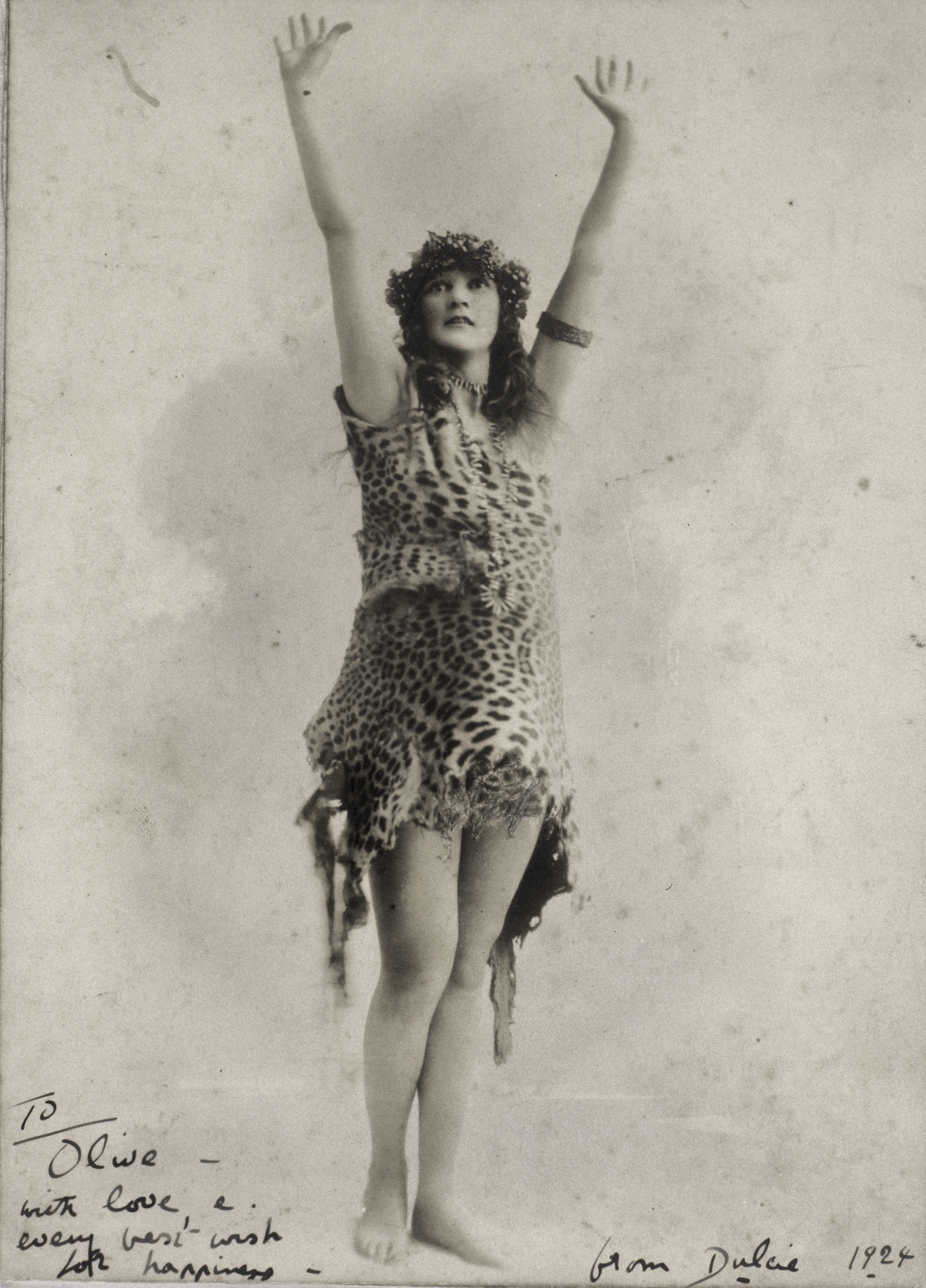
Deamer in leopard-skin costume (1924)

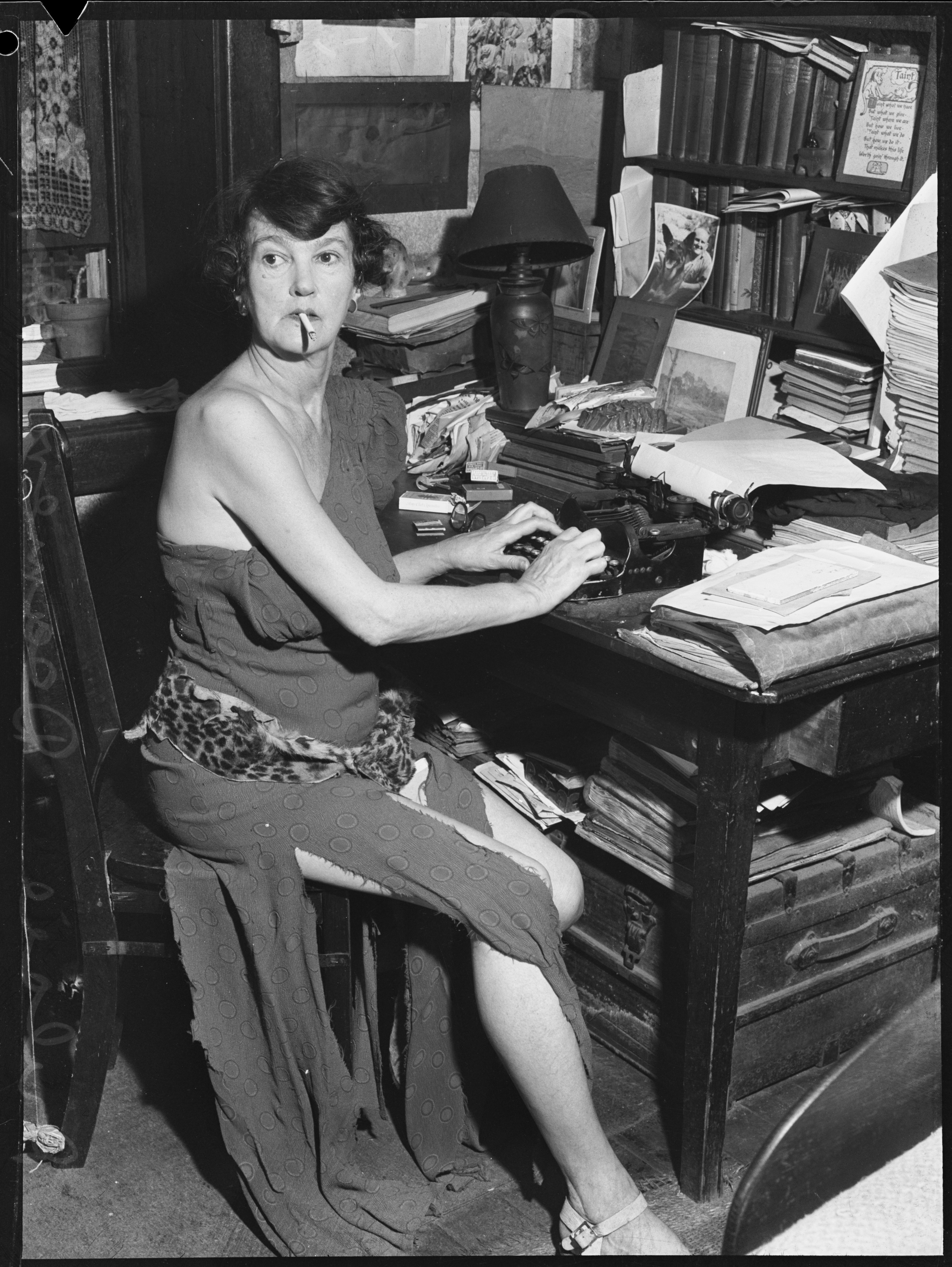
Dulcie Deamer, Kings Cross, Sydney, 1 April 1950

In the 1920–30s Dulcie Deamer was a poet, playwright and author in Sydney, where she was Australia's first female boxing reporter.

Deamer was known as the "Queen of Bohemia" due to her involvement with Norman Lindsay's literary and artistic circle, the Bohemian world of Kings Cross, Sydney, and vaudeville. During the inter-war years, many balls were held in Sydney, including those known as the "Artists' Balls" which had been held as far back as the 1880s. Dulcie Deamer attended every Artists' Ball for 30 years. The leopard-skin costume with dog-tooth necklace that she wore to the 1923 Artists' Ball in Sydney "has come to symbolise the joie de vivre of the decade, despite Deamer's own protest regarding its relevance."

The balls regularly made the newspapers and behaviour at the 1924 Ball, which Dulcie referred to as "The Night of the Great Scandal", resulted in the introduction of restrictions on alcohol and a greater police presence for subsequent events.

Hooligans took control of Sydney Town Hall basement during the progress of the Artists' Ball on Friday night, and had to be ejected by the police. Prior to this two persons had to be arrested for drunkenness, and two as being suspected persons. Several free fights developed, and many persons were injured when beer bottles were thrown. The Inspector-General of Police agrees that there were many instances of unseemly conduct. He attributes them to unlimited supplies of liquor and lack of efficient control.

Queanbeyan Age and Queanbeyan Observer
2 September 1924

A modern critic has noted that Deamer's work "demonstrates a fascination with religion, mythology and classical literature (typical of associates such as Norman Lindsay, Rosaleen Norton and Hugh McCrae) and is characteristically ornamental in style." Poems written by Deamer appeared in the souvenir program of the 1924 ball along with those of Kenneth Slessor.

== Literary works ==
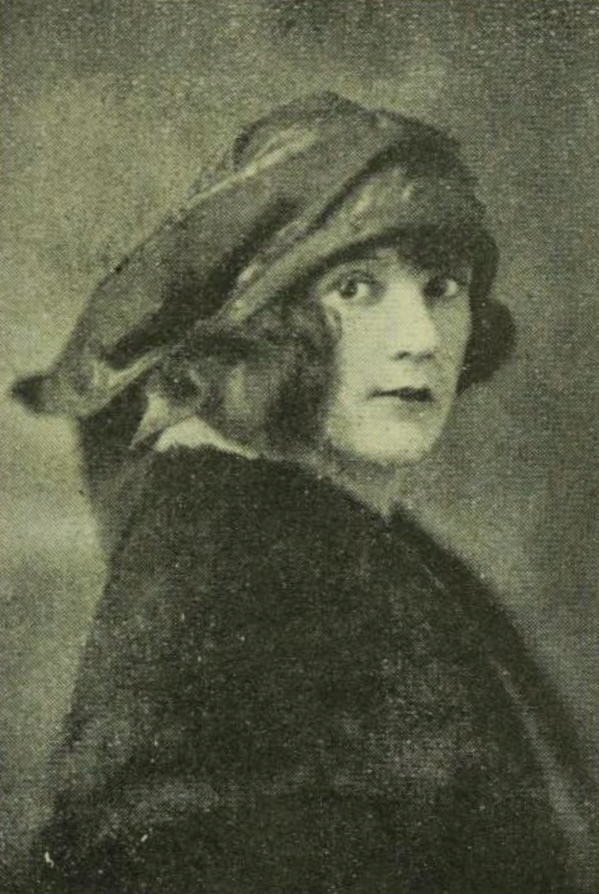
Dulcie Deamer in 1928

Novels

- The Suttee of Safa (New York, 1913)
- Revelation (London, 1921)
- The Street of the Gazelle (London, 1922)
- The Devil's Saint (London, 1924)
- Holiday (1940)

Short Stories

- As It Was in the Beginning (Melbourne, 1929)

Plays

- That by which Men Live (1936)
- Victory (1938)

Poetry

- Messalina (1932)
- The Silver Branch (1948)

== Oral History ==
Deamer was interviewed in 1965 by Hazel de Berg. The interview can be found at the National Library of Australia.

== Death ==
Deamer died at the Little Sisters of the Poor, Randwick, New South Wales, aged 81. She had written an unpublished autobiography in the 1960s, later published in 1998. Her daughter, the theologian Rosemary Goldie, died at Randwick as well, three decades later.

== Sources ==
- Adelaide, Debra (1988). Australian Women Writers: A Bibliographic Guide. London, Sydney: Pandora. ISBN 9780863581496.
- Creswell, Toby (2008). Notorious Australians: The Mad, the Bad and the Dangerous. Sydney: ABC Books. ISBN 9780733317170. See p. 15.
