= Charles Sirato =

Hungarian poet, art theorist, and translator (1905–1980)

- Born: 26 January 1905; Újvidék, Serbia
- Died: 1 January 1980 (aged 74–75); Budapest, Hungary
- Occupations: Poet; art theorist; translator

Charles Sirato (26 January 1905, in Újvidék – 1 January 1980, in Budapest) was a Hungarian poet, art theorist, and translator. He most famously authored the Dimensionist manifesto.

== Life ==
=== Dimensionist manifesto ===
In 1936 in Paris, Charles Tamkó Sirató published his Manifeste Dimensioniste, which described how

the Dimensionist tendency has led to:

1. Literature leaving the line and entering the plane.
2. Painting leaving the plane and entering space.
3. Sculpture stepping out of closed, immobile forms.
4. …The artistic conquest of four-dimensional space, which to date has been completely art-free.

The manifesto was signed by many prominent modern artists worldwide. Yervand Kochar, Hans Arp, Francis Picabia, Kandinsky, Robert Delaunay and Marcel Duchamp amongst others added their names in Paris, then a short while later it was endorsed by artists abroad including László Moholy-Nagy, Joan Miró, David Kakabadze, Alexander Calder, and Ben Nicholson.

== List of works ==
=== Literature ===
- Manifeste Dimensioniste, 1936
- Az Élet tavaszán, 1921
- Le Planisme, 1936
- Kiáltás, 1942
- A három űrsziget, 1969
- A Vízöntő-kor hajnalán, 1969
- Tengereczki Pál, 1970
- A hegedű vőlegénye, 1971
- Pinty és Ponty, 1972
- Kozmogrammok, 1975
- Tengereczki hazaszáll, 1975
- Szélkiáltó, 1977
- Jövőbúvárok, 1980
- Összegyűjtött versei I., 1993
