= Stanley Bradshaw =

English cricketer

Personal information
- Full name: Stanley William Bradshaw
- Born: 16 January 1898; Leicester, Leicestershire, England
- Died: 9 January 1980 (aged 81); Oadby, Leicestershire, England
- Batting: Right-handed

Domestic team information
- Years: Team
- 1923: Leicestershire

Career statistics
Competition	First-class
Matches	3
Runs scored	9
Batting average	1.50
100s/50s	–/–
Top score	5
Balls bowled	–
Wickets	–
Bowling average	–
5 wickets in innings	–
10 wickets in match	–
Best bowling	–
Catches/stumpings	2/–
- Source: Cricinfo, 7 February 2013

Stanley William Bradshaw (16 January 1898 – 9 January 1980) was an English cricketer. Bradshaw was a right-handed batsman. He was born at Leicester, Leicestershire.

Bradshaw made his first-class debut for Leicestershire against Lancashire in the 1923 County Championship at Old Trafford. He made two further first-class appearances in that season's County Championship, against Gloucestershire and Sussex. He scored just 9 runs in his three matches with a high score of 5.

He died at Oadby, Leicestershire on 9 January 1980.
