= Fred Geary (cricketer) =

English cricketer (1887–1980)

Frederick William Geary (9 December 1887 – 8 January 1980) was an English cricketer active in 1923 who played for Glamorgan. He was born and died in Hinckley. He appeared in two first-class matches as a righthanded batsman who bowled right arm medium pace. He scored three runs and took no wickets.
