= Thierry Agullo =

French artist

Thierry Agullo (1945 in Bordeaux – 29 January 1980 in Poitiers), was a French artist.

He is best known for his collections of irons, shoes, and other objects (Note: A collection of irons and shoes named 94 pointes lancées à bouts tronqués is exhibited at the Musée d'art moderne de Saint-Étienne. Other collections are held at the Musée de l'objet of Blois.) in the sociological art movement of the 1970s.

== Biography ==
Thierry Agullo was interested in typography and publishing as a youth and had an apprenticeship under Robert Morel at Soleil Noir.

In 1965, he began to collect used irons, which he exhibited for the first time in December 1972 – as well as wallets, purses, and gloves.

In 1971, he also produced typographical compositions, collages, and cut-up texts.

In 1974, he met the artist Pierre Molinier, who became a colleague as well as a close friend.
Their friendship resulted in two series of photographs: L'Indécence, 110 black and white photographs produced as a limited edition book by the À l'Enseigne des Oudins gallery in 1975, and Thérèse Agullo on the theme of androgyny, created in 1976 just before the suicide of Pierre Molinier.

In 1975, he joined the Collectif d'Art Sociologique which was founded in 1974 by Fred Forest.

In 1979, he was editor of a posthumous collection of poems by Pierre Molinier, Les Orphéons magiques, written between 1946 and 1950.

== Written works ==
- Robinet d'amour (Poems of 1977), Al Dante, 2000 ISBN 978-2-911073-61-8
- Tracts hétéroclite, Al Dante, 2000 ISBN 978-2-911073-62-5

== Recent exhibitions ==
- Thierry Agullo, À l'Enseigne des Oudins Gallery, Paris, 1 July-30 September 2000.
- François Pluchart – l'art, un acte de participation au monde, Fonds régional d'art contemporain in Bourgogne, 16 November 2002 – 4 January 2003.
