= Eduard Boje =

South African cricketer

Personal information
- Full name: Eduard Herman Louis Boje
- Born: 16 April 1969 (age 57); Bloemfontein, Orange Free State, South Africa
- Batting: Right-handed
- Bowling: Right-arm fast-medium
- Role: Bowler
- Relatives: N Boje (brother)

Domestic team information
- Years: Team
- 1989–1991: Orange Free State "B"

Career statistics
Competition	FC
Matches	6
Runs scored	49
Batting average	9.80
100s/50s	0/0
Top score	23
Balls bowled	672
Wickets	8
Bowling average	46.12
5 wickets in innings	0
10 wickets in match	0
Best bowling	2/46
Catches/stumpings	3/-
- Source: CricketArchive, 28 December 2012

Eduard Herman Louis Boje (/ˌbɔɪˈjeɪ/ boy-YAY; born 16 April 1969) is a former South African cricketer. The older brother of Nicky Boje, who played international cricket for South Africa, Boje was born in Bloemfontein, the capital of the province of Orange Free State (now Free State). All of his matches at first-class level were played for Orange Free State "B". Orange Free State "B" played in the Castle Bowl (effectively the second division of the Currie Cup), with the competition including the "B" teams of the major cricketing regions, as well as less successful teams such as Border, Boland, and Griqualand West. Boje debuted for the team in the 1989–90 competition, playing four matches as a right-arm fast bowler. He played a further two matches the following season, but was largely unsuccessful, failing to take more than two wickets in an innings. Boje's last first-class match, against Eastern Province "B" at Goodyear Park in January 1991, was played alongside his brother, who scored 77 runs and took four wickets.
