= Sidney Styler =

English cricketer

Sidney William Styler (26 August 1908 – 27 January 1980) was an English first-class cricketer. He was a right-handed batsman and wicket-keeper who played 18 times for Worcestershire between 1929 and 1931. He made three stumpings and took 23 catches, but his batting was very poor: he averaged a mere 5.36 from his 31 innings. In 1944 he played twice in minor matches for the National Fire Service team against Glamorgan.

Styler was born in Cotteridge, Warwickshire, and died in Worcester at the age of 71.
