= Fred van der Poel =

Dutch footballer

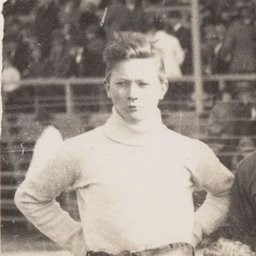
- Van der Poel (1923)

Personal information
- Birth name: Franciscus Cornelis Gerardus van der Poel
- Date of birth: 5 February 1902
- Place of birth: Surakarta, Java, Dutch East Indies (nowadays: Indonesia)
- Date of death: 23 January 1980 (aged 77)
- Place of death: Rotterdam, Netherlands
- Position: Goalkeeper

Senior career*
Years	Team	Apps	(Gls)
1922–1923	Velocitas Breda		

International career
1923	Netherlands	1	(0)
- * Club domestic league appearances and goals

Franciscus Cornelis Gerardus "Fred" van der Poel (5 February 1902 – 23 January 1980) was a Dutch military officer, and a football goalkeeper. He played one match for the Netherlands national football team in 1923. During World War II, he was taken prisoner of war by Japan and worked on the Burma Railway. He survived and fought in the Indonesian National Revolution on the Dutch side.

== Biography ==
Van der Poel was born on 5 February 1902 in Surakarta, Java, Dutch East Indies. Between 1922 and 1923, he played for Velocitas Breda. He played in one match for the Netherlands national football team in 1923 which was a 8–1 victory against France.

In 1921, van der Poel joined the Royal Netherlands East Indies Army. On 14 February 1925, he left for the Dutch East Indies as second lieutenant in the infantry. On 15 August 1942, Captain van der Poel was taken prisoner of war by Japan. He was first sent to No.4 Branch Camp in Batavia. On 25 January 1943, he was shipped from Batavia by Tacoma Maru 2, and arrived in Changi Prison in Singapore on 28 January. On 18 April, he was transferred by train 58 to Camp Nong Pladuk near Ban Pong, Thailand. Camp Nong Pladuk was a transit camp from which prisoners were put to work on the Burma Railway.

Van der Poel survived World War II, however the Indonesian National Revolution started. In 1946, he was promoted Major and stationed at Semarang, Java. In April 1948, he became vice-chairman of the Voetbalbond Batavia. In 1949, the Netherlands recognised Indonesian independence. Therefore, van der Poel was honourably discharged on 25 July 1950, due to the dissolution of the Royal Netherlands East Indies Army.

Van der Poel died on 23 January 1980 in Rotterdam, Netherlands, at the age of 77.
