= George S. Champlin =

American philanthropist

George Stanton Champlin (1882 – January 14, 1980) was a Rhode Island businessman who bequeathed his family fortune to the Champlin Foundation, which makes grants to tax exempt organizations in the state.

He was the son of George Byron Champlin, and the grandson of Stanton Byron Champlin, who founded the S.B. Champlin Company in Providence, Rhode Island in 1872.

Today, the foundation gives to causes which George S. Champlin championed, including libraries.

He is buried near his father and grandfather in Swan Point Cemetery.
