= Enrico Carzino =

Italian footballer (1897-1965)

Personal information
- Date of birth: 27 September 1897
- Place of birth: Sampierdarena, Italy
- Date of death: 8 February 1965 (aged 67)
- Position: Goalkeeper

Senior career*
| Years | Team | Apps | (Gls) |
| 1919–1925 | Sampierdarenese | - | (-) |
| 1925–1931 | Genoa | 18 | (0) |
| 1931–1933 | Imperia | - | (-) |
- * Club domestic league appearances and goals

Enrico Carzino (27 September 1897 in Sampierdarena – 8 February 1965) was an Italian professional footballer who played as a goalkeeper.

His brother Ercole Carzino also played football professionally. To distinguish them, Enrico was referred to as Carzino I and Ercole as Carzino II.
