= Pierre Mony =

French footballer (1896–1980)

Personal information
- Date of birth: 23 March 1896
- Place of birth: Paris, France
- Date of death: 1 January 1980 (aged 83)
- Place of death: Boulogne-Billancourt, France
- Position: Defender

Senior career*
Years	Team	Apps	(Gls)
–1921	Boulogne		
1921–1923	CASG		
1923–1926	OSC Boulogne		
1926–	Boulogne		

International career
1920–1923	France	5	(0)
- * Club domestic league appearances and goals

Pierre Mony (23 March 1896 – 1 January 1980) was a French footballer who played as a defender. He was chosen for the France national team at the 1920 Summer Olympics but did not play. He shot his friend Jean Delpierre, whom he suspected of having an affair with his wife. Mony was later acquitted of murder in court. He was the older brother of Alexis Mony, another former French international footballer.

== Sources ==
- Pierre Mony at the French Football Federation (archived) (in French)
