= André Barthélémy =

French politician

André Barthélémy (16 June 1896, Dole, Jura – 31 January 1980) was a French politician. He represented the French Communist Party in the Constituent Assembly elected in 1945, Constituent Assembly elected in 1946 and in the National Assembly from 1946 to 1958. Later on he joined the Unified Socialist Party (PSU).
