= Nicky Boje =

South African cricketer (born 1973)

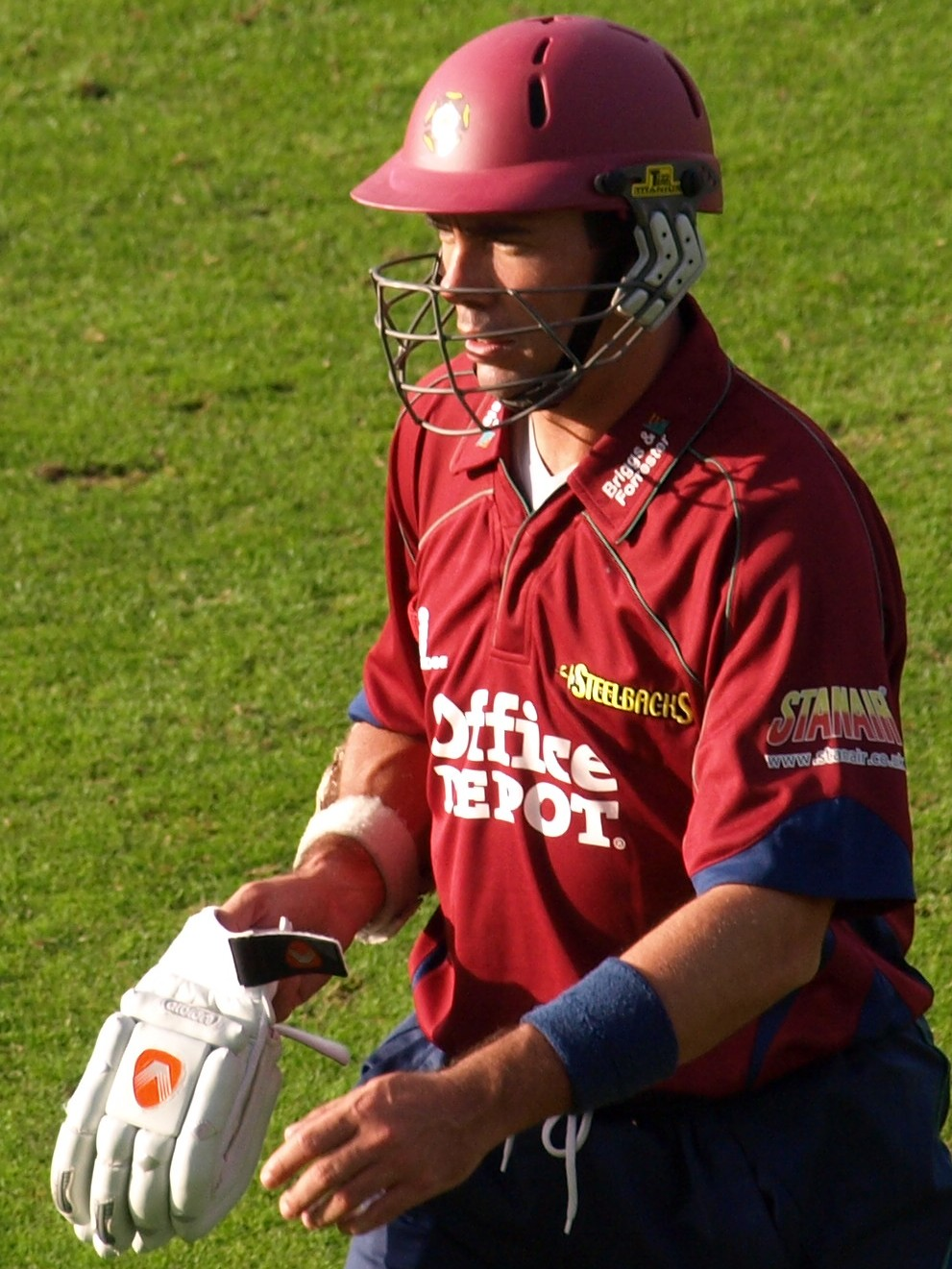

Personal information
- Full name: Nico Boje
- Born: 20 March 1973 (age 53); Bloemfontein, Orange Free State Province, South Africa
- Nickname: Godfrey Boje
- Height: 173 cm (5 ft 8 in)
- Batting: Left-handed
- Bowling: Slow left-arm orthodox
- Role: All-rounder
- Relatives: Eduard Boje (brother)

International information
- National side: South Africa (1995–2006)
- Test debut (cap 276): 24 February 2000 v India
- Last Test: 4 August 2006 v Sri Lanka
- ODI debut (cap 34): 21 October 1995 v Zimbabwe
- Last ODI: 30 October 2005 v New Zealand
- Only T20I (cap 1): 21 October 2005 v New Zealand

Domestic team information
- Years: Team
- 1990/91–2012/13: Free State
- 2002: Nottinghamshire
- 2003/04–2006/07: Eagles
- 2007–2010: Northamptonshire (squad no. 17)
- 2009/10–2011/12: Warriors
- 2012/13–2013/14: Knights

Career statistics
Competition	Test	ODI	FC	LA
Matches	43	115	216	321
Runs scored	1,312	1,414	9087	4,423
Batting average	25.23	26.67	34.42	24.70
100s/50s	0/4	2/4	8/56	2/17
Top score	85	129	226*	129
Balls bowled	8620	4541	43,135	13,490
Wickets	100	96	585	305
Bowling average	42.65	35.57	32.70	32.36
5 wickets in innings	3	1	22	1
10 wickets in match	0	0	2	0
Best bowling	5/62	5/21	8/93	5/21
Catches/stumpings	18/–	33/–	125/-	95/–
Medal record
Representing South Africa
Men's Cricket
Commonwealth Games
Gold medal – first place	1998 Kuala Lumpur	List-A cricket
- Source: ESPNcricinfo, 31 October 2021

Nico Boje (/ˌbɔɪˈjeɪ/ boy-YAY; born 20 March 1973) is a South African former cricketer who played in 43 Tests, 115 One Day Internationals and single Twenty20 International for South Africa. Boje was a member of the South Africa team that won the 1998 ICC KnockOut Trophy.

Boje was a member of Africa XI team for 2005 Afro-Asia Cup. He is the first cap of Twenty20 Internationals for South Africa as well.

He attended Grey College in Bloemfontein. He is currently coaching the Knights cricket team in the Free State, South Africa. His brother, Eduard Boje, also played first-class cricket.

== Domestic career ==
=== Northamptonshire ===
Boje joined English team Northamptonshire CCC for the last few weeks of the 2007 season as a replacement overseas player for Johan Van der Wath. A few days later it was announced that he would be joining the breakaway Indian Cricket League. In 2008, the captain of Northamptonshire, David Sales, resigned and Boje took over the role as captain for Northamptonshire. In that season, he scored his highest ever First class cricket score of 226*. He signed a new one-year contract on 3 September 2009 which saw him lead the club through the 2010 season.

== International career ==
Boje's international career began in 1995 against Zimbabwe, and although he was in and out of the team due to injuries he established himself as South Africa's first choice spin bowler. Due to the amount of all-rounders in the South African team, Boje usually batted at eight or nine in the batting order, despite a first class batting average of 32 and both Test and ODI averages around 26, which was the highest for a regular number nine in Test cricket in the 2000s. However, despite the reasonably high average he never hit a Test century, although did make two ODI centuries against New Zealand in 2000–01. And also in that 6 match ODI series, he amassed 355 runs in 6 innings and broke the record for scoring the most runs in a 6 match bilateral ODI series

In December 2006, Boje announced his retirement from international cricket, effective immediately. He finished his career with exactly 100 Test wickets, the wicket of Mahela Jayawardene in his final Test brought up his milestone.
