= Gilbert E. Smith =

American sports coach (1903–1980)

Biographical details
- Born: September 22, 1903; Defiance, Ohio, U.S.
- Died: January 1, 1980 (aged 76)

Playing career

Football
- 1924–1927: Defiance

Coaching career (HC unless noted)

Football
- 1933–1935: Defiance

Basketball
- 1933–1936: Defiance

Baseball
- 1934–1936: Defiance

Head coaching record
- Overall: 11–11–2 (football); 27–16 (basketball); 12–18 (baseball)

Gilbert Emerson Smith (September 22, 1903 – January 1, 1980) was an American football, basketball, and baseball coach at Defiance College in Defiance, Ohio.
