= Albert McGinn =

Australian cricketer

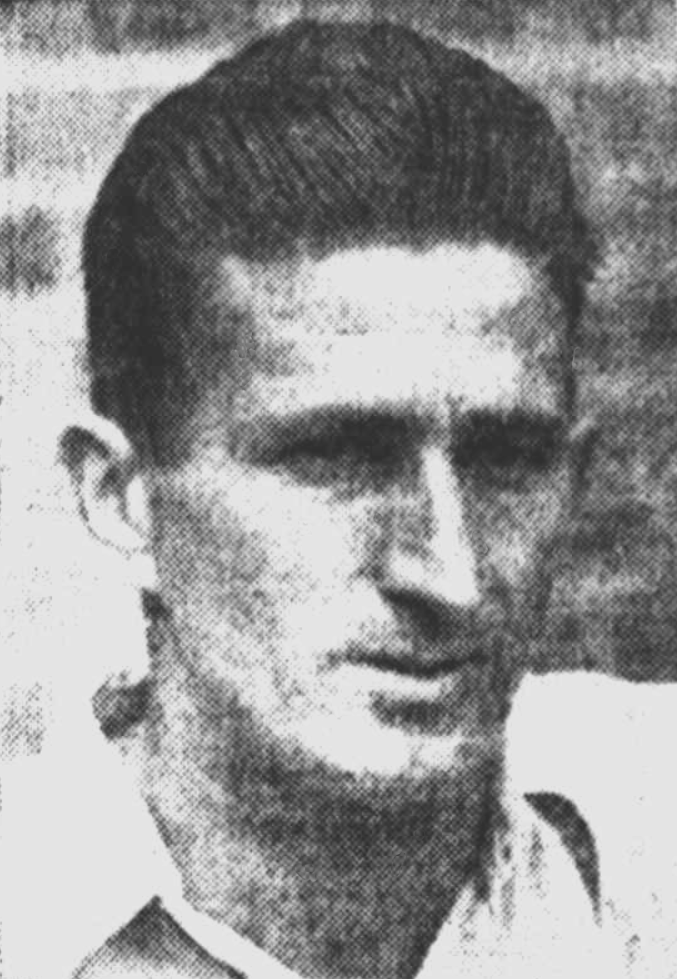

Personal information
- Born: 11 November 1913; Brisbane, Queensland, Australia
- Died: 20 August 2006 (aged 92); Brisbane, Queensland, Australia
- Source: Cricinfo, 5 October 2020

Albert McGinn (11 November 1913 – 20 August 2006) was an Australian cricketer. He played in four first-class matches for Queensland between 1941 and 1948. He also played for Northern Suburbs District Cricket Club (Norths).

== See also ==
- List of Queensland first-class cricketers
