= Ambadi Ikkavamma =

Indian writer and translator of Malayalam literature

- Born: Ambadi Ikkavamma; 12 January 1898; Thrippunithura, Kingdom of Cochin (present-day Kerala), British India
- Died: 30 January 1980 (aged 82)
- Education: St. Teresa's Convent, Thrippunithura
- Occupations: Writer, translator, teacher
- Spouse: Vellattu Karunakaran Nair
- Parent(s): Naniamma and Kochu Govinda Menon (of Ambadi house)
- Writing career
- Language: Malayalam, English, Hindi, Sanskrit
- Period: 1925–1980
- Genres: Children's literature, translation, philosophy
- Notable works: Tolstoy Kathakal, Anasakti Yogam, Matham Pourasthya Paschathya Rajyangalil
- Notable awards: Children's Literature Award by the President of India (1956), Kerala Sahitya Akademi Award (1978)

Ambadi Ikkavamma (12 January 1898 – 30 January 1980) was an Indian Malayalam language writer, translator, and educator, known for her pioneering translations of Leo Tolstoy's moral stories into Malayalam and for translating Mahatma Gandhi's Anasakti Yoga (commentary on the Bhagavad Gita). She was among the earliest women translators in Malayalam literature to bring Western literary works to Kerala readers, and her translations played a significant role in introducing Tolstoy's ethical philosophy to Malayalam-speaking audiences. Apart from Malayalam, she was also well versed in English, Hindi and Sanskrit language literature.

== Early life and education ==
Ikkavamma was born on 12 January 1898 in Thrippunithura, in the erstwhile Kingdom of Cochin, as the daughter of Naniamma and Kochu Govinda Menon of the Thekke Ambadi house. She completed her primary education in Thrippunithura and her high school education at St. Teresa's Convent. She went on to serve as a teacher for many years, initially at a government school in Thrippunithura. She was also recognised as a musical virtuoso.

== Personal life ==
Ikkavamma married Vellattu Karunakaran Nair, a literary figure who was a follower of Annie Besant, a colleague of Mancheri Ramayyar, and a leader of the Brahmavidya Sangham (Theosophical Society branch). Karunakaran Nair's deep knowledge of spirituality and Indian philosophy broadened Ikkavamma's own intellectual horizons and supported her literary pursuits.

== Literary career ==
=== Tolstoy translations ===
Ikkavamma's literary career was primarily devoted to translation. Her reverence for Leo Tolstoy was inspired by Mahatma Gandhi, who regarded Tolstoy as one of his principal intellectual guides. Although A. Gopala Menon was the first to translate some Tolstoy stories for children into Malayalam, it was Ikkavamma's translations that gained wide circulation and lasting popularity.

In 1925, Gandhi wrote a brief letter to Ikkavamma approving the list of Tolstoy stories she had selected for translation, making her the first writer to receive Gandhi's endorsement for translating Tolstoy's works into an Indian language. Her collection of twenty-three Tolstoy stories, adapted for children and general readers, was published in 1926 with a notable foreword by K. P. Kesava Menon, the founding editor of Mathrubhumi. The work marked one of the earliest instances of Western literary influence enriching Malayalam literature, and was particularly significant as an early example of Western literary engagement in women's writing in Malayalam.

The Tolstoy stories were reprinted in 1967 by the Indo-Soviet Cultural Association, Ernakulam, on the occasion of the fiftieth anniversary of the October Revolution.

=== Anasakti Yogam ===
During the Indian independence movement, Gandhi composed Anasakti Yoga, his personal commentary on the Bhagavad Gita, as a guide for freedom fighters advocating non-attachment and righteous action. Ikkavamma translated this work from Hindi into Malayalam without, as contemporary accounts noted, any loss of the original's philosophical depth. The first edition was published in 1931 and was followed by numerous reprints.

=== Meeting with Gandhi (1934) ===
In 1934, when Gandhi visited Ernakulam, Ikkavamma, then a teacher at the government school in Thrippunithura, travelled to meet him along with a group of women. She intended to present her Malayalam translation of Anasakti Yogam to him. All the women arrived wearing khadi garments. When Gandhi asked whether they wore khadi regularly, Ikkavamma replied honestly that they had worn it only for the occasion of meeting him. Gandhi was not offended, responding that open confession is good for the soul.

=== Translation of Radhakrishnan's work ===
In 1965, Ikkavamma visited New Delhi with her youngest son and sought an audience with President Radhakrishnan, who was a distinguished philosopher. She presented her published works to him and also brought a copy of his book East and West in Religion (1933) for his autograph. Impressed by Ikkavamma's intellectual calibre and philosophical inclination, Radhakrishnan personally asked her to translate the book into Malayalam. The resulting translation, titled Matham Pourasthya Paschathya Rajyangalil (Religion in Eastern and Western Countries), remains a notable work in the comparative study of religions in Malayalam. The foreword for this work was also written by K. P. Kesava Menon.

=== Other works ===
Ikkavamma's literary output spanned multiple genres including philosophy, biography, and children's literature. Her notable works include:

- Asokante Dharmalipikal – a translation and study of the Edicts of Ashoka
- Translations of Oscar Wilde's stories for children
- Kuttikalude Vivekanandan (Children's Vivekananda) – a biography of Swami Vivekananda for young readers
- Oru Achan Makalkkayacha Kathukal – a Malayalam translation of Jawaharlal Nehru's Letters from a Father to His Daughter
- Balakathagal (Children's stories)

== Awards and recognition ==
- 1956 – Children's Literature Award from the President of India for Balakathagal
- 1978 – Award from the Kerala Sahitya Akademi

== Death ==
Ikkavamma died on 30 January 1980, having lived for eighty-two years. Over the course of her career spanning more than five decades, she made significant contributions to Malayalam literature, particularly in making philosophical and literary works from other languages accessible to Malayalam readers.

== Selected bibliography ==
=== Translations ===
- Tolstoy Kathakal (Tolstoy Stories, 3 volumes, 1926; reprinted 1967)
- Anasakti Yogam (translation of Gandhi's Anasakti Yoga, 1931)
- Oru Achan Makalkkayacha Kathukal (translation of Nehru's Letters from a Father to His Daughter)
- Matham Pourasthya Paschathya Rajyangalil (translation of Radhakrishnan's East and West in Religion)
- Asokante Dharmalipikal (translation of the Edicts of Ashoka)
- Translations of Oscar Wilde's stories for children

=== Original works ===
- Kuttikalude Vivekanandan (Children's Vivekananda)
- Balakathagal (Children's stories)

== See also ==
- Malayalam literature
- Leo Tolstoy
- Anasakti Yoga
- K. P. Kesava Menon
- Kerala Sahitya Akademi
