= Maud Isaacks =

American politician (1885–1980)

Member of the Texas House of Representatives from district 74-1
- In office January 8, 1963 – January 10, 1967
- Preceded by: District created
- Succeeded by: Walter L. Knapp

Member of the Texas House of Representatives from district 105-1
- In office March 15, 1954 – January 8, 1963
- Preceded by: Samuel Jackson Isaacks
- Succeeded by: District abolished

Personal details
- Born: October 26, 1885 Austin, Texas
- Died: January 22, 1980 (aged 94) El Paso, Texas
- Party: Democratic

Maud Isaacks (October 26, 1885 – January 22, 1980) was an American politician who served in the Texas House of Representatives from 1954 to 1967.
