= Bill McCoy (cricketer) =

New Zealand cricketer

Personal information
- Full name: Alan Winston McCoy
- Born: 13 January 1906; Geraldine, New Zealand
- Died: 1 January 1980 (aged 73); Auckland, New Zealand
- Nickname: Bill
- Batting: Left-handed
- Bowling: Right-arm leg-spin

Domestic team information
- Years: Team
- 1929/30–1936/37: Auckland

Career statistics
Competition	First-class
Matches	10
Runs scored	228
Batting average	15.20
100s/50s	0/1
Top score	68*
Balls bowled	1,004
Wickets	18
Bowling average	31.88
5 wickets in innings	0
10 wickets in match	0
Best bowling	3/43
Catches/stumpings	6/–
- Source: ESPNcricinfo, 16 June 2023

Alan Winston "Bill" McCoy (13 January 1906 – 1 January 1980) was a New Zealand cricketer. He played ten first-class matches for Auckland between 1929 and 1937.

McCoy was a lower-order batsman and leg-spin bowler. His highest first-class score was 68 not out against Wellington in the Plunket Shield in 1929–30, when he add 100 for the ninth wicket with Mal Matheson. His best bowling figures were 3 for 43 against Wellington in December 1931.

McCoy was educated at Auckland Grammar School. He served as a sergeant with the New Zealand Army in the Second World War, and was taken prisoner by the Germans. He became a bank manager in Auckland.
