= Uno Willers =

Swedish historian and librarian

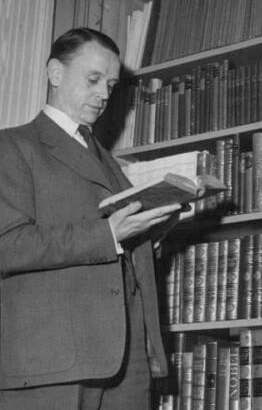
- Willers in 1947
- Born: 20 October 1911; Stockholm, Sweden
- Died: 10 January 1980 (aged 68)
- Occupations: Historian, librarian
- Spouse: Greta Bellinder (m. 1939)
- Awards: Order of the Polar Star; Order of Merit of the Federal Republic of Germany; Order of the Falcon; Order of St. Olav; Legion of Honour; Illis quorum

Uno Erik Wilhelm Willers (20 October 1911 – 10 January 1980) was a Swedish historian and librarian. He served as National Librarian (Riksbibliotekarie) of Sweden from 1952 to 1977.

== Early life ==
Willers was born on 20 October 1911 in Stockholm, Sweden, the son of Einar Willers, a police judge, and his wife Malin (née Dahlgren). He passed studentexamen in 1931 and worked at the Karolinska Institute's library from 1931 to 1936. Willers attended the University of Marburg in 1933 and earned a Bachelor of Arts degree in 1936 and studied history and library science in Geneva in 1937 and 1938 and in Berlin from 1938 to 1939 when he earned a Licentiate degree.

== Career ==
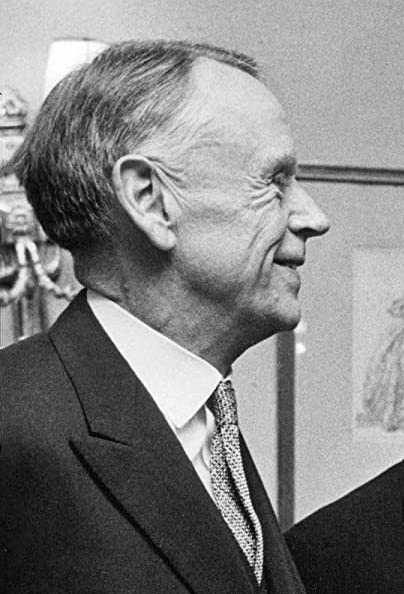
Willers in 1965

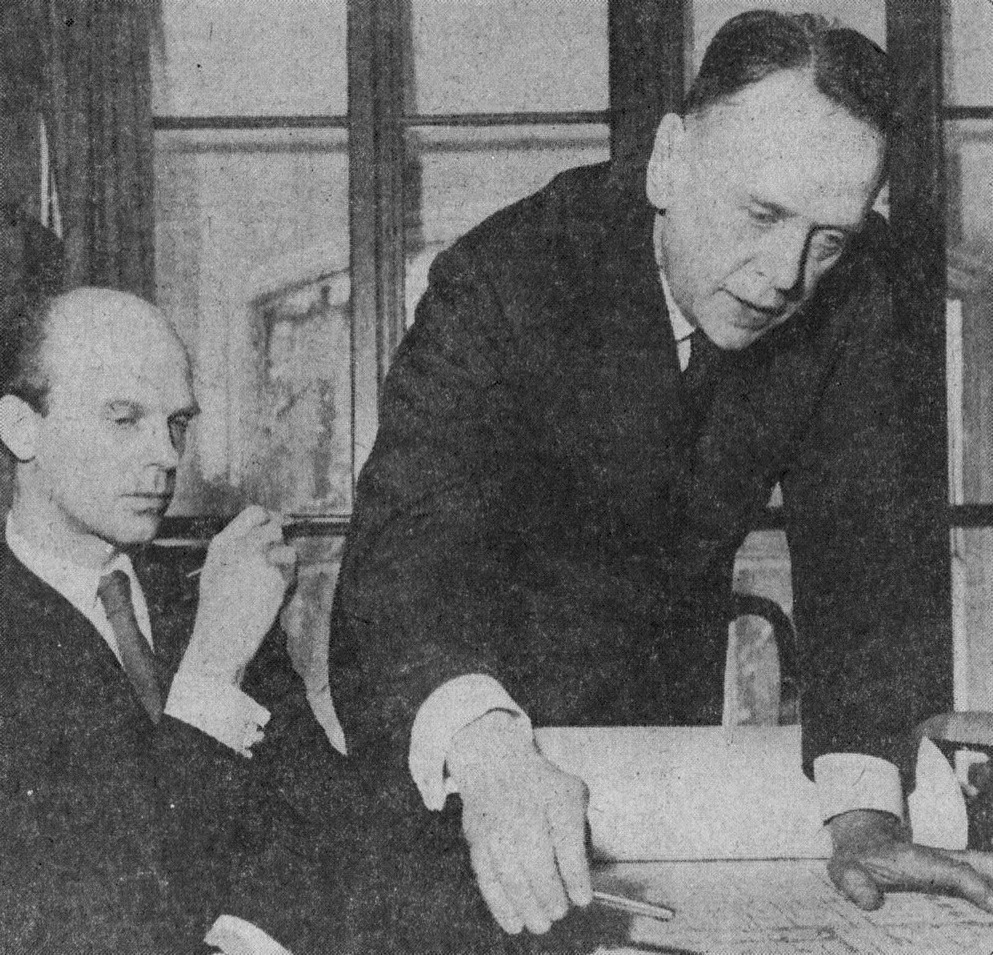
Willers (right) and architect Carl Hampus Bergman with drawings for the National Library of Sweden's rebuilding

Willers worked at the Riksdag Library from 1941 to 1942 and the National Library of Sweden from 1942. Willers was editor of the Svensk studentkalender ("Swedish Student Calendar") from 1937 to 1944 and served as secretary of the Stockholm Federation of Student Unions in 1938. He was also a member of the Swedish Society for Personal History (Personhistoriska samfundet) from 1943. Willers was a member of the Swedish intelligence agency C-byrån during World War II.

Willers earned a Doctor of Philosophy degree in 1945 was director of the Svenska studenthemmet i Paris ("the Swedish Student Home in Paris") at Cité Internationale Universitaire de Paris from 1946 to 1947. He then served as docent in history at Stockholm University College from 1945 to 1950 and from 1946 to 1947 Willers served as librarian at the Sainte-Geneviève Library in Paris. He was director of the Nobel Library of the Swedish Academy from 1946 to 1950 and was deputy director (kansliråd) and head of the Ministry for Foreign Affairs' archives from 1950 to 1952. Willers was appointed National Librarian (Riksbibliotekarie) of Sweden and head of the National Library of Sweden in 1952.

Willers became a reserve officer in 1938 and lieutenant of the Swedish Army Quartermaster Corps' reserve in 1938 and captain of the same in 1946. In 1947, he was appointed secretary in the Swedish Academy's Nobel Committee, a position he held until 1967. He was secretary in the Utredningen rörande Stockholms högskolas framtida ställning ("Investigation concerning Stockholm University College's future position") in 1948 and in the Stockholmsbibliotekens samarbetsnämnd ("Stockholm Library's Cooperation Committee") from 1949 to 1953, serving as its chairman in 1954. Willers was a substitute for the chairman of the Längmanska kulturfondens nämnd ("Council of the Längman Culture Fund") in 1959 and board member of the Arbetarrörelsens arkiv ("Archive of the Swedish Labour Movement") from 1953 to 1971. He was a member of the working committee of the Swedish National Commission for UNESCO (Svenska Unescorådet) from 1954 to 1959 and its vice chairman from 1954 to 1959. Willers was chairman of the board of the Grafiska institutet ("Graphic Institute") from 1959 to 1974 and of the Stockholm City Theatre from 1961 to 1970 as well the Swedish Tourist Association from 1961 to 1967. He was board member of the Office of the Chancellor of the Swedish Universities (Universitetskanslersämbetet) from 1964 and chairman of the board of the Research Library Council (Forskningsbiblioteksrådet) from 1964.

== Personal life ==
In 1939, he married Greta Bellinder (born 1917), the daughter of the Justice of the Supreme Court of Sweden, Sven Bellinder and Karin (née Gustafsson). He was the father of Catharina (born 1939), Erik (born 1942), Margareta (born 1944) and Ulric (born 1948).

== Awards and decorations ==
- (Sweden) Commander of the Order of the Polar Star
- (West Germany) Grand Officer of the Order of Merit of the Federal Republic of Germany
- (Iceland) Grand Knight's Cross of the Order of the Falcon (18 March 1953)
- (Norway) Commander of the Order of St. Olav (1 July 1952)
- (France) Knight of the Legion of Honour
- (Sweden) Illis quorum

== Honors ==
- Member of the Royal Society for Publication of Manuscripts on Scandinavian History (1952)
- Member of the Royal Swedish Academy of Sciences
- Member of the Royal Skyttean Society
- Honorary member of the Royal Swedish Society of Naval Sciences

Government offices
Preceded by Oscar Wieselgren	National Librarian (Riksbibliotekarie) of Sweden; 1952–1977	Succeeded by Lars Tynell
