= Fred Dick =

Australian rules footballer

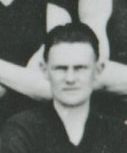

Personal information
- Full name: Frederick John Dick
- Born: 18 November 1898; Brunswick East, Victoria
- Died: 23 January 1980 (aged 81); Hampton, Victoria
- Original team: Hampton

Playing career^{1}
Years	Club	Games (Goals)
1926–27	Melbourne	6 (1)
- ^{1} Playing statistics correct to the end of 1927.

Frederick John Dick (18 November 1898 – 23 January 1980) was an Australian rules footballer who played with Melbourne in the Victorian Football League (VFL).
