= Ercole Carzino =

Italian footballer (1901-1980)

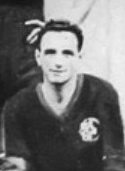

Personal information
- Date of birth: 9 October 1901
- Place of birth: Sampierdarena, Italy
- Date of death: 10 January 1980 (aged 78)
- Place of death: Genoa, Italy
- Position: Midfielder

Senior career*
Years	Team	Apps	(Gls)
1917–1929	Sampierdarenese	178	(14)
1929–1931	Imperia	38	(12)
1931–1933	Sampierdarenese	6	(0)

International career
1921-1924	Italy	1	(0)

Managerial career
- 1929–1931: Imperia
- 1931–1933: Sampierdarenese
- 1933–1934: Rapallo Ruentes
- 1936–1938: Sestrese
- * Club domestic league appearances and goals

Ercole Carzino (Italian pronunciation: [ˈɛrkole karˈtsiːno]; 9 October 1901 – 10 January 1980) was an Italian professional footballer who played as a midfielder.

== International career ==
Carzino made his only appearance for the Italy national football team on 6 November 1921 in a game against Switzerland.

== Personal life ==
Carzino's older brother Enrico Carzino also played football professionally. To distinguish them, Enrico was referred to as Carzino I and Ercole as Carzino II.

== Bibliography ==
- Dellachà, Ginno (2016). Una Storia Biancorossonera "Il calcio a San Pier d'Arena dal tempo dei pionieri del Liguria alla Sampdoria".

Sporting positions
Preceded by Sebastiano Ramasso	Sampierdarenese captain 1921–1932	Succeeded by Giuseppe Raggio
