= Boje Postel =

German painter

- Born: April 8, 1890; Hemme, Kingdom of Prussia, German Empire
- Died: January 6, 1980 (aged 89); Purley, Surrey, United Kingdom
- Education: Max Liebermann
- Known for: Painting
- Notable work: Painting of Maximilian Harden (in the Harvard collection)

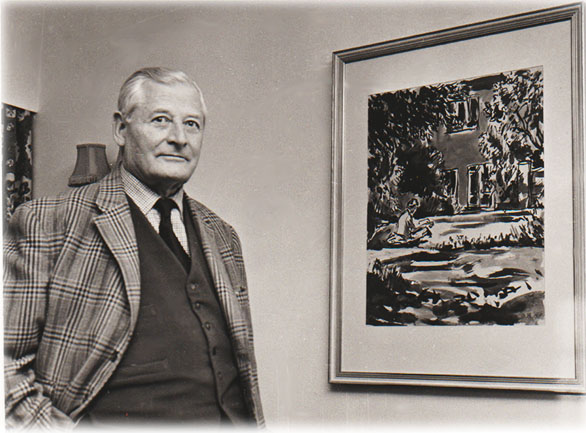
Boje Postel. Undated photograph, with permission of the owner

Boje Postel (8 April 1890 – 6 January 1980) was a German-born painter and pupil of Max Liebermann.

== Early life ==
Boje Postel was born on 8 April 1890 in Hemmerwurth in the rural west of Schleswig-Holstein in the north of Germany. He was the son of a farmer.

== Training as an artist and early professional life ==
At the age of 14 Postel discovered his love for the arts after he had seen paintings by Édouard Manet and Max Liebermann. At this age he started spending his time in the countryside painting and drawing. When he finished school in 1908, he left the countryside to go to Hamburg to study with various painters including Arthur Siebelist.

Postel avoided the First World War due to the fact that he suffered from tuberculosis. It took him quite a bit of time to recover. Towards the end of the war he moved on to study in Munich. A 1918 drawing shows a rural scene in Schwabing/Munich.

Postel then moved onto Berlin and undertook private studies with Wilhelm Mueller-Schoenfeld. He was also taught by Martin Brandenburg and Lovis Corinth. He then met Max Liebermann. It is understood that Postel brought a drawing of horses to their first meeting and that Lieberman liked it a lot and said “Die Pferde bewegen sich ja! [These horses are moving!]”. Postel was taught and also very much influenced by Liebermann's art and the surrounding artist movement, the Berlin Secession.

Postel was able to exhibit his work quite early. He was able to exhibit his work within this movement in 1912 in Berlin at the Fünfundzwanzigste Ausstellung der Berliner Secession Zeichnende Künste (25th exhibition of the Berlin Secession movement). He also exhibited in August 1913 at an exhibition organised by another group of Berlin artists the Juryfreie Kunstschau 4. Ausstellung (4th Exhibition without judging panel). Both exhibitions occurred at Ausstellungshaus am Kurfuerstendamm in Berlin, Germany. Although Postel was close to the ideas and protagonists of the Secession movement he was not a member in 1913 according to the list of members at the subsequent 26th exhibition.

== Travel 1924-1936 ==
Beginning in 1922, Postel travelled extensively to England, Spain the Netherlands, Italy and France. He received further influences from Fauvism and Cubism. Both influences led to a step-by-step move away from impressionist art. In 1924 Postel settled in London but still had a room in Berlin. It is documented that in 1927 he had a room in Nr 213 Kurfuerstendamm in Berlin, suggesting some wealth or income given the fact that this was a prestigious and expensive address in 1920s Berlin. After 1933, Postel's mentor Max Liebermann fell in disgrace with the National Socialist regime and resigned as president of the Prussian Academy of Arts in 1933. Postel left Germany together with his Jewish girlfriend Nina, a pianist, and spent the following years with travel to the Netherlands, Majorca and Maribor in present-day Slovenia. It is unclear why he chose this particular destination but it is assumed that his girlfriend Nina's Viennese family may have had a summer house there as this was not uncommon for wealthy Viennese families at the time. In Maribor he acquired a stray dog by the name of Chuta who became the subject of many black and white sketches at the time. A good number of aquarell paintings still exist from his time in Mallorca. It is believed that he left Mallorca for London at the start of the Spanish Civil War in 1936. The fate of German artists in exile during the years 1933-1945 has been described in detail elsewhere. At some stage during this time he married Nina but later divorced her. The fact that they remained in a relationship and lived together for many years even after the divorce could suggest that they divorced due to the worsening situation for them as a couple given that Nina was Jewish.

== Permanent exile and subsequent internment on the Isle of Man 1936-1945 ==
In 1936, Postel and his ex-wife Nina still lived together and settled in London. Postel made a living with teaching and freelance painting. He spent the years between 1941 and 1944 in an internment camp for Germans in exile on the Isle of Man. Owing to the relatively benign conditions there, Postel was able to continue drawing and painting, both landscapes and portrait work. However he and Nina were in different camps due to the fact that they were no longer married. A number of his portraits from this period have survived although many of the sitters remain unknown to the present day. It is assumed that they were mainly fellow camp inmates many of them presumably German intellectuals, artists and scientists in exile.

== 1945-1960 ==
Back in London since 1944 he continued his teaching as well as freelance painting to make a living. These activities continued in the post-war years. He would often spend his time in parks in London teaching children basic drawing and sketching techniques. Numerous landscapes from this period depict landscapes in London such as Hyde Park.

== 1960-1980 ==
Postel's first wife Nina died in 1960 in Genoa. The following years saw him alternating between Germany and Britain. He had a number of exhibitions in Germany, France and the UK. In 1972, he married his second wife Marjorie in Surrey. Boje Postel died on 6 January 1980 in Purley, Surrey.

== Scope of work ==
Boje Postel's work focuses on portraits as well as nature and scenes from city life. Most of his works are drawings in black and white and portraits. A good example, a print of a portrait drawing of German journalist Maximilian Harden, is in the Harvard Art Collection. There are also quite a few Watercolor paintings such as park landscapes. Postel also left behind a large number of sketches both landscape and portrait. He also enjoyed sketching his dog Chuta who he had picked up during his travels near Maribor in present day Slovenia. The catalogue of the 1996 exhibition in Wilhelmshaven in Germany gives a good overview of his career with photos of many of his key works, as does a private website on his life and work.
