= Marien Oulton Dreyer =

Australian writer and journalist (1911–1980)

- Born: 24 September 1911; Mornington, Victoria, Australia
- Died: 16 January 1980 (aged 68); Darlinghurst, Australia
- Other names: Marien Cooper, "Gallery Girl"
- Occupations: Journalist, Playwright, Short-story writer, Activist
- Employers: New Idea Magazine; Australian Broadcasting Corporation; Sydney Morning Herald
- Organizations: Kings Cross Protection Association; Australian Journalists' Association
- Notable work: "The Day I Wiggled My Big Toe" (1959); Bandicoot on a Burnt Ridge (1962/3); Without Fear or Favour (1966)
- Spouse: Rodney Beaumont Lovell Cooper
- Children: 2
- Awards: Walkley Award

Marien Oulton Dreyer (24 September 1911 – 16 January 1980), also known as Marien Cooper, was an Australian journalist, playwright and short-story writer. She wrote a weekly column for New Idea magazine as well as numerous scripts for radio. In 1959 she was joint winner of the Walkley Award for best magazine feature article.

== Early life ==
Marien Dreyer was born on 24 September 1911 at Mornington, Victoria. Her parents were Mary Oulton, née Rosson, and Joseph Dreyer, a journalist from New Zealand. During childhood she lost a leg; she nicknamed its wooden replacement "Annabella" and in later life held it an annual party. She attended a convent school in Melbourne before leaving at age 14 to work as a stenographer.

Dreyer lived in Sydney between 1937 and 1939. During the Second World War she returned to Melbourne, where she worked as a telephonist for the Australian Imperial Force. She returned to Sydney in 1940 and settled in Darlinghurst.

== Journalism ==
Under the nom de plume "Gallery Girl," Dreyer began writing theatre reviews for women's magazines. From the 1940s she published many short stories and serials. Between 1955 and 1962 she wrote a weekly column for New Idea magazine, "This Week with Marien Dreyer."

She also wrote frequently for radio for the Australian Broadcasting Corporation. Her scripts included "Story of a Lame Duck" (1951), an autobiographical account of living with a disability, and "Hard Way Back" (1953), which described the challenges faced by a recovering tuberculosis patient. The latter attracted controversy when it was denied permission to be broadcast after the Commonwealth Department of Health objected that it "over-emphasise[d] ... past the bounds of reality" the challenges experienced by patients (tuberculosis was considered a sensitive subject; a 1948 report by Maxwell Dunn had been suppressed on similar grounds). Deyer appealed but her appeal was dismissed, a decision she described as "a slur on her reputation and contrary to free speech."

In 1959 she was joint winner (with Harry Fox) of the Walkley Award for Best Magazine Feature Story (Non-Fiction) for her article "The Day I Wiggled My Big Toe," published in New Idea.

In the 1960s she co-authored three books with retired magistrate Arthur Debenham: Without Fear or Favour, All Manner of People and The Innocent Victims.

== Theatre ==
Dreyer's plays included a series of one-act plays produced at the Pocket Playhouse Theatre in St Peters, Sydney, and Wish No More, a fairytale for adults. Her satirical play Bandicoot on a Burnt Ridge won the Journalist's Club Award for 1962–3.

== Community activism ==
Dreyer lived in the Darlinghurst and Kings Cross area for 40 years and in the 1960s and 1970s became a leading voice of community opposition to the construction of the Kings Cross Tunnel at the top of William Street. She was the publicity officer for the Kings Cross Protection Association and organised visits to politicians and protest marches.

== Personal life ==
Dreyer married fellow journalist Rodney Beaumont Lovell Cooper in the late 1930s in Melbourne. They moved to Sydney in 1940 and had two sons. She died on 16 January 1980 in Darlinghurst.
