= List of Buena Vista Beavers head football coaches =

The Buena Vista Beavers football team represents Buena Vista University in college football. The team competes at the NCAA Division III level as a member of the American Rivers Conference (ARC). The program has had 33 head coaches since it began to play during the 1898 college football season. Since the start of the 2023 season, Austin Dickinson has served as head coach of the Beavers.

== Key ==
Key to symbols in coaches list
General		Overall		Conference		Postseason (Note: Although the first Rose Bowl Game was played in 1902, it has been continuously played since the 1916 game, and is recognized as the oldest bowl game by the NCAA. "—" indicates any season prior to 1916 when postseason games were not played.)	
No.	Order of coaches (Note: A running total of the number of head coaches, with coaches who served separate tenures being counted only once. Interim head coaches are represented with "Int" and are not counted in the running total. "—" indicates the team played but either without a coach or no coach is on record. "X" indicates an interim year without play.)	GC	Games coached	CW	Conference wins	PW	Postseason wins
DC	Division championships	OW	Overall wins	CL	Conference losses	PL	Postseason losses
CC	Conference championships	OL	Overall losses	CT	Conference ties	PT	Postseason ties
NC	National championships	OT	Overall ties (Note: Overtime rules in college football were introduced in 1996, making ties impossible in the period since.)	C%	Conference winning percentage		
†	Elected to the College Football Hall of Fame	O%	Overall winning percentage (Note: When computing the win–loss percentage, a tie counts as half a win and half a loss.)				

== Coaches ==
List of head football coaches showing season(s) coached, overall records, conference records, and championships
No.	Name	Season(s)	GC	OW	OL	OT	O%	CW	CL	CT	C%	CC
–	Unknown	1898–1901	12	8	4	0	0.667	–	–	–	–	–
1	Billy Edson (Note: The Buena Vista all-time record erroneously lists no coach for the 1902–1905 and 1907 seasons, though Billy Edson, coached the team.)	1902–1905, 1907	25	14	9	2	0.600	–	–	–	–	–
2	Marion Blankenhorn (Note: The Buena Vista all-time record erroneously lists no coach for the 1909 season, though professor "M. Blankernhorn", coached the team.)	1909	5	2	2	1	0.500	–	–	–	–	–
3	Frank Harrison (Note: The Buena Vista all-time record erroneously lists that there was no season played in 1910 when five games were played under "Professor Harrison" according to the school's yearbook.) (Note: The Buena Vista all-time record erroneously lists Lloyd D. Crouch as head coach for 1911 and 1912 when there is no record of him ever being a part of the Buena Vista staff whereas Newspapers and the school yearbook mention "Coach Harrison" and Reyburn Rutledge in 1911 and 1912 respectively.)	1910–1911	12	1	10	1	0.125	–	–	–	–	–
4	Reyburn Rutledge	1912	6	1	5	0	0.167	–	–	–	–	–
5	Arthur Hammond (Note: The Buena Vista all-time record erroneously lists no coach for 1914 when Hammond still served as head coach.)	1913–1914	10	3	7	0	0.300	–	–	–	–	–
6	Edward Ball	1915	7	4	2	1	0.643	–	–	–	–	–
7	Robert Preston	1916	8	5	3	0	0.625	–	–	–	–	–
8	A. A. Gilmore (Note: Erranously referred to as C. E. Gilmore in Buena Vista yearbook despite being correctly referred to on earlier pages.)	1917	4	1	3	0	0.250	–	–	–	–	–
9	C. White (Note: The Buena Vista all-time record erroneously lists no coach for 1918 when "C. White" is referred to as head coach in newspapers.)	1918	4	3	0	0	1.000	–	–	–	–	–
10	V. A. Woodworth (Note: The Buena Vista all-time record erroneously lists A. A. Gilmore as head coach in 1919 instead of Woodworth.)	1919	5 (Note: Includes two wins and two losses erroneously left out of the Buena Vista all-time record.)	3	2	0	0.600	–	–	–	–	–
11	George Wanner	1920–1921	14	7	6 (Note: Includes one loss erroneously left out of the Buena Vista all-time record.)	1	0.536	–	–	–	–	–
12	Jim Kelly (Note: The Buena Vista all-time record erroneously lists Jim Kelly as "J. D. Kelley" while newspapers often referred to him as "J. D. Kelly.")	1922–1925	31	23	5	3	0.790	6	1	0	0.857	–
13	Burton North	1926	8	0	7	1	0.063	0	5	1	0.083	–
14	Francis Casey (Note: The Buena Vista all-time record lists him as Francis L. Casey.)	1927–1934	70	28	36	6	0.443	13	25	2	0.350	–
15	Albert Dallagher	1935–1938	33	19	13	1	0.591	11	7	0	0.611	–
16	Clyde A. Drury (Note: The Buena Vista all-time record erroneously lists that no seasons were played from 1939 to 1941.)	1939–1941	33	5	15	3	0.283	2	10	2	0.214	–
17	Jake LaFoy (Note: The Buena Vista all-time record erroneously lists that no season was played in 1942.)	1942	6	1	4	1	0.250	1	3	1	0.300	–
18	Harland Riebe	1946	7	1	6	0	0.143	Iowa Conference/DIAC 1/1	4/2	0/0	0.200/0.333	–
19	Kenny Blackman	1947	9	3	5	1	0.389	0/3	5/1	0/1	.000/0.700	1 Dakota-Iowa (1947)
20	Bob Otto (Note: The Buena Vista all-time record lists him as James R. 'Bob" Otto.)	1948–1952	45	24	19	2	0.556	10/3	10/0	0/1	0.500/0.875	1 Iowa Conference (1952)
21	Chester Anderson	1953–1954	18	7	9	2	0.444	3	5	1	0.389	–
22	Dean Laun (Note: The Buena Vista all-time record lists him as Dean C. Laun.)	1955–1959	44	24	18	2	0.568	20	16	1	0.554	–
23	Wayne Barham (Note: The Buena Vista all-time record lists him as D. Wayne Barnham.)	1960	9	4	5	0	0.444	3	4	0	0.429	–
24	John H. Jennett (Note: The Buena Vista all-time record lists him as J. H. Jennett.)	1961–1962	9	4	5	0	0.444	4	5	0	0.444	–
25	John Naughton	1963–1969	70	28	42	1	0.401	22	37	1	0.375	–
26	Jim Hershberger	1970–1982, 1984–1989	178	117	60	1	0.660	90	46	1	0.661	3 Iowa Conference (1972–1973, 1978)
27	Al Lewis (interim)	1983	10	6	4	0	0.600	5	2	0	0.714	–
28	Kevin Twait	1990–1995	56	12	44	0	0.214	12	36	0	0.250	–
29	Joe Hadachek	1996–1999	40	22	18	0	0.550	21	15	0	0.583	–
30	Steve Osterberger	2000–2005	60	32	28	0	0.533	27	26	0	0.509	–
31	Jay Anderson	2006–2016	110	42	68	0	0.382	35	49	0	0.417	–
32	Grant Mollring	2017–2022	50	16	34	0	0.320	10	30	0	0.250	–
33	Austin Dickinson	2023–present	30	7	23	0	0.233	6	18	0	0.250	–

== Bios ==
=== Reyburn Rutledge ===
Reyburn Rutledge
Biographical details
- Born: June 29, 1888; Fort Dodge, Iowa, U.S.
- Died: August 26, 1939 (aged 51); Fort Dodge, Iowa, U.S.

Playing career
- 1908–1911: Iowa State
- Position: Tackle

Coaching career (HC unless noted)
- 1912: Buena Vista

Head coaching record
- Overall: 1–5

Reyburn Lorenzo Rutledge (June 29, 1888 – August 26, 1939) was an American college football coach. He was the head football coach for Buena Vista College—now known as Buena Vista University—in 1912.

Head coaching record

Year	Team	Overall	Conference	Standing	Bowl/playoffs
Buena Vista BVers (Independent) (1912)
1912	Buena Vista	1–5			
Buena Vista:		1–5			
Total:		1–5			

=== Arthur Hammond ===
Arthur Hammond
Biographical details
- Education: Lafayette College

Coaching career (HC unless noted)
- 1913–1914: Buena Vista

Head coaching record
- Overall: 3–7

Arthur B. Hammond Jr. was an American college football coach. He was the head football coach for Buena Vista College—now known as Buena Vista University—from 1913 to 1914.

Head coaching record

Year	Team	Overall	Conference	Standing	Bowl/playoffs
Buena Vista BVers (Independent) (1913–1914)
1913	Buena Vista	3–3			
1914	Buena Vista	0–4			
Buena Vista:		3–7			
Total:		3–7			

=== Robert Preston ===
Robert Preston
Coaching career (HC unless noted)
- 1916: Buena Vista

Head coaching record
- Overall: 5–3

Robert Preston was an American college football coach. He was the head football coach for Buena Vista College—now known as Buena Vista University—in 1916.

Head coaching record

Year	Team	Overall	Conference	Standing	Bowl/playoffs
Buena Vista BVers (Independent) (1916)
1916	Buena Vista	5–3			
Buena Vista:		5–3			
Total:		5–3			

=== A. A. Gilmore ===
A. A. Gilmore
Coaching career (HC unless noted)
- 1917: Buena Vista

Head coaching record
- Overall: 1–3

A. A. Gilmore was an American college football coach. He was the head football coach for Buena Vista College—now known as Buena Vista University—in 1917.

Head coaching record

Year	Team	Overall	Conference	Standing	Bowl/playoffs
Buena Vista BVers (Independent) (1917)
1917	Buena Vista	1–3			
Buena Vista:		1–3			
Total:		1–3			

=== V. A. Woodworth ===
V. A. Woodworth
Biographical details
- Born: April 7, 1887; Rensselaer, Indiana, U.S.
- Died: February 10, 1971 (aged 83); Lakeland, Florida, U.S.

Coaching career (HC unless noted)
- 1919: Buena Vista

Head coaching record
- Overall: 3–2

Vaughn Ansel Woodworth (April 7, 1887 – February 10, 1971) was an American college football coach. He was the head football coach for Buena Vista College—now known as Buena Vista University—in 1919.

Head coaching record

Year	Team	Overall	Conference	Standing	Bowl/playoffs
Buena Vista BVers (Independent) (1919)
1919	Buena Vista	3–2			
Buena Vista:		3–2			
Total:		3–2			

=== George Wanner ===
George Wanner
Coaching career (HC unless noted)
- 1920–1921: Buena Vista

Head coaching record
- Overall: 7–6–1

George Wanner was an American college football coach. He was the head football coach for Buena Vista College—now known as Buena Vista University—from 1920 to 1921.

Head coaching record

Year	Team	Overall	Conference	Standing	Bowl/playoffs
Buena Vista BVers / Beavers (Independent) (1920–1921)
1920	Buena Vista	4–2			
1921	Buena Vista	3–4–1			
Buena Vista:		7–6–1			
Total:		7–6–1			

=== Burton North ===
Burton North
Coaching career (HC unless noted)
- 1926: Buena Vista

Head coaching record
- Overall: 0–7–1

Burton North was an American college football coach. He was the head football coach for Buena Vista College—now known as Buena Vista University—in 1926.

Head coaching record

Year	Team	Overall	Conference	Standing	Bowl/playoffs
Buena Vista Beavers (Iowa Conference) (1926)
1926	Buena Vista	0–7–1	0–5–1	14th	
Buena Vista:		0–7–1	0–5–1		
Total:		0–7–1			

=== Francis Casey ===
Francis Casey
Coaching career (HC unless noted)
- 1927–1934: Buena Vista

Head coaching record
- Overall: 28–36–6

Francis Casey was an American college football coach. He was the head football coach for Buena Vista College—now known as Buena Vista University—from 1927 to 1934.

Head coaching record

Year	Team	Overall	Conference	Standing	Bowl/playoffs
Buena Vista Beavers (Iowa Conference) (1927–1934)
1927	Buena Vista	3–5–1	0–4–1	13th	
1928	Buena Vista	5–3–1	3–2	T–5th	
1929	Buena Vista	6–1–2	3–1–1	T–2nd	
1930	Buena Vista	4–5	2–3	9th	
1931	Buena Vista	1–7–1	0–5	14th	
1932	Buena Vista	1–7	1–4	13th	
1933	Buena Vista	2–6–1	1–4	12th	
1934	Buena Vista	6–2	3–2	5th	
Buena Vista:		28–36–6	13–25–2		
Total:		28–36–6			

=== Albert Dallagher ===
Albert Dallagher
Coaching career (HC unless noted)
- 1935–1938: Buena Vista

Head coaching record
- Overall: 19–13–1

Albert Dallagher was an American college football coach. He was the head football coach for Buena Vista College—now known as Buena Vista University—from 1935 to 1938.

Head coaching record

Year	Team	Overall	Conference	Standing	Bowl/playoffs
Buena Vista Beavers (Iowa Conference) (1935–1938)
1935	Buena Vista	4–4–1	2–2	8th	
1936	Buena Vista	7–2	4–1	T–3rd	
1937	Buena Vista	5–3	3–2	5th	
1938	Buena Vista	3–4	2–2	6th	
Buena Vista:		19–13–1	12–7		
Total:		19–13–1			

=== Jake LaFoy ===
Jake LaFoy
Coaching career (HC unless noted)
- 1942: Buena Vista

Head coaching record
- Overall: 1–4–1

Jake LaFoy was an American college football coach. He was the head football coach for Buena Vista College—now known as Buena Vista University—in 1942.

Head coaching record

Year	Team	Overall	Conference	Standing	Bowl/playoffs
Buena Vista Beavers (Iowa Conference) (1942)
1942	Buena Vista	1–4–1	1–3–1	9th	
Buena Vista:		1–4–1	1–3–1		
Total:		1–4–1			

=== Harland Riebe ===
Harland Riebe
Coaching career (HC unless noted)
- 1946–1947: Buena Vista

Head coaching record
- Overall: 2–10–1

Harland Riebe was an American college football coach. He was the head football coach for Buena Vista College—now known as Buena Vista University—from 1946 to 1947.

Head coaching record

Year	Team	Overall	Conference	Standing	Bowl/playoffs
Buena Vista Beavers (Iowa Conference / Dakota-Iowa Athletic Conference) (1946–1947)
1946	Buena Vista	1–6	1–4 / 1–2	T–8th / 4th	
1947	Buena Vista	1–4–1	0–5 / 1–0–1		
Buena Vista:		2–10–1	1–9 / 2–2–1		
Total:		2–10–1			

=== Kenny Blackman ===
Kenny Blackman
Coaching career (HC unless noted)
- 1947: Buena Vista (interim HC)

Head coaching record
- Overall: 2–1

Accomplishments and honors

Championships
- 1 DIAC (1947)

Kenny Blackman was an American college football coach. He was the interim head football coach for Buena Vista College—now known as Buena Vista University—in 1947.

Head coaching record

Year	Team	Overall	Conference	Standing	Bowl/playoffs
Buena Vista Beavers (Iowa Conference / Dakota-Iowa Athletic Conference) (1947)
1947	Buena Vista	2–1	0–0 / 2–1	T–12th / T–1st	
Buena Vista:		2–1	0–0 / 2–1		
Total:		2–1			
National championship Conference title Conference division title or championship game berth

=== Wayne Barham ===
Wayne Barham
Coaching career (HC unless noted)

Football
- 1960: Buena Vista

Basketball
- 1961–?: Fergus Falls

Track and field
- 1960: Buena Vista

Head coaching record
- Overall: 4–5 (college football)

Delbert Wayne Barham was an American college football coach. He was the head football coach for Buena Vista College—now known as Buena Vista University—in 1960.

Head coaching record
College football

Year	Team	Overall	Conference	Standing	Bowl/playoffs
Buena Vista Beavers (Iowa Conference) (1960)
1960	Buena Vista	4–5	3–4	T–6th	
Buena Vista:		4–5	3–4		
Total:		4–5			

=== John H. Jennett ===
John H. Jennett
Biographical details
- Born: February 6, 1930; Breda, Iowa, U.S.
- Died: October 20, 2019 (aged 89); Cedar Falls, Iowa, U.S.
- Education: Drake University (1953, 1959)

Coaching career (HC unless noted)

Football
- 1953: Drake (freshman)
- 1954: Lake City HS (IA)
- 1955–1960: Morningside (line)
- 1961–1962: Buena Vista

Basketball
- 1955–1960: Morningside (freshman)

Track and field
- 1954: Lake City HS (IA)
- 1955–1960: Morningside
- 1961: Buena Vista
- 1962–1975: State College of Iowa / Northern Iowa

Cross country
- 1962–1975: State College of Iowa / Northern Iowa

Head coaching record
- Overall: 7–11 (college football)

John Howard Jennett (February 6, 1930 – October 20, 2019) was an American college football coach. He was the head football coach for Buena Vista College—now known as Buena Vista University—in 1961.

Head coaching record
College football

Year	Team	Overall	Conference	Standing	Bowl/playoffs
Buena Vista Beavers (Iowa Conference) (1961)
1961	Buena Vista	4–5	3–5	T–6th	
Buena Vista:		4–5	3–5		
Total:		4–5			

=== John Naughton ===
John Naughton
Biographical details
- Education: Buena Vista College (1950)

Coaching career (HC unless noted)

Football
- 1952–1953: Marathon HS (IA) (assistant)
- 1954–1955: Mankato State (backfield)
- 1956–1960: St. Edmond HS (IA)
- 1961: Fort Dodge
- 1962–1969: Buena Vista

Baseball
- 1954–1955: Mankato State

Head coaching record
- Overall: 28–42–1 (college football)

John Naughton was an American college football coach. He was the head football coach for Buena Vista College—now known as Buena Vista University—from 1962 to 1969.

Head coaching record
College football

Year	Team	Overall	Conference	Standing	Bowl/playoffs
Buena Vista Beavers (Iowa Conference) (1962–1969)
1962	Buena Vista	3–6	3–6	7th	
1963	Buena Vista	4–5	3–5	T–6th	
1964	Buena Vista	3–5–1	2–5–1	T–7th	
1965	Buena Vista	6–3	4–3	T–4th	
1966	Buena Vista	6–3	4–3	T–4th	
1967	Buena Vista	2–6	2–5	6th	
1968	Buena Vista	2–7	2–5	T–6th	
1969	Buena Vista	2–7	2–5	7th	
Buena Vista:		28–42–1	22–37–1		
Total:		28–42–1			

=== Al Lewis ===
Al Lewis
Playing career

Football
- 1957–1960: Ottawa (KS)

Basketball
- 1957–1960: Ottawa (KS)

Track and field
- 1957–1960: Ottawa (KS)

Coaching career (HC unless noted)

Football
- 1961–1962: Plains HS (KS)
- 1963–1982: Buena Vista (DC)
- 1983: Buena Vista (interim HC)
- 1984–1988: Buena Vista (DC)

Administrative career (AD unless noted)
- ?: Buena Vista

Head coaching record
- Overall: 6–4 (college)

Albert Lester "Butch" Lewis was an American college football coach. He was the interim head football coach for Buena Vista College—now known as Buena Vista University—in 1983.

Head coaching record
College

Year	Team	Overall	Conference	Standing	Bowl/playoffs
Buena Vista Beavers (Iowa Conference) (1983)
1983	Buena Vista	6–4	5–2	3rd	
Buena Vista:		6–4	5–2		
Total:		6–4			
