= 1973 Buena Vista Beavers football team =

American college football season

1973 Buena Vista Beavers football

Iowa Conference champion
- Conference: Iowa Conference
- Record: 8–1 (7–0 Iowa)
- Head coach: Jim Hershberger (4th season)
- Defensive coordinator: Al Lewis (11th season)
- Home stadium: Bradford Field

1973 Iowa Conference football standings
	Conf.					Overall
Team	W		L		T	W		L		T
No. 9 Buena Vista $	7	–	0	–	0	8	–	1	–	0
Central (IA)	6	–	1	–	0	7	–	2	–	0
Wartburg	4	–	3	–	0	5	–	4	–	0
Dubuque	3	–	3	–	1	5	–	4	–	1
William Penn	3	–	4	–	0	6	–	4	–	0
Luther	2	–	4	–	1	2	–	6	–	1
Simpson (IA)	1	–	5	–	1	2	–	6	–	1
Upper Iowa	0	–	6	–	1	1	–	7	–	1
$ – Conference champion; Rankings from NAIA Division II poll

The 1973 Buena Vista Beavers football team was an American football team that represented Buena Vista College as a member of the Iowa Conference (now known as the American Rivers Conference) during the 1973 NAIA Division II football season. In their fourth year under head coach Jim Hershberger, the Beavers compiled an 8–1 record (7–0 in conference games), won the Iowa Conference championship, and outscored opponents by a total of 208 to 106. The team's only loss was to the eventual NAIA Division II national champion Northwestern Red Raiders. It was Buena Vista's first outright conference championship since 1952.

Guard Joe Kotal was selected as a first-team All-American. Quarterback Charlie Mullligan was selected as the Iowa Conference Most Valuable Player, and Hershberger received the conference's Coach of the Year award.

The team played its home games at Bradford Field in Storm Lake, Iowa.

== Schedule ==
Date	Opponent	Site	Result	Attendance	Source
September 15	at Westmar*	Le Mars, IA	W 48–0		
September 22	Northwestern (IA)*	Bradford Field; Storm Lake, IA	L 15–28	4,500	
September 29	at Wartburg	Schield Stadium; Waverly, IA	W 21–12		
October 6	Dubuque	Bradford Field; Storm Lake, IA	W 20–16		
October 13	at Central (IA)	Pella, IA	W 8–2		
October 20	at Luther	Carlson Stadium; Decorah, IA	W 21–7		
October 27	Simpson (IA)^{†}	Bradford Field; Storm Lake, IA	W 33–21		
November 3	at Upper Iowa	Fayette, IA	W 27–13		
November 10	William Penn	Bradford Field; Storm Lake, IA	W 17–7		
*Non-conference game; ^{†}Homecoming

== Awards and honors ==
Buena Vista personnel received multiple honors at the end of the 1973 season, including the following:

- Guard Joe Kotval, a 6-foot-3, 250-pound senior, was selected by the Associated Press (AP) as a first-team player on the 1973 Little All-America college football team. It was Kotval's second consecutive year winning All-America honors.
- Senior quarterback Charlie Mulligan, who passed for 907 yards and six touchdowns, was unanimously selected as the Most Valuable Player in the Iowa Conference.
- Head coach Jim Hershberger was selected as the Iowa Conference Coach of the Year.

In addition to Mulligan and Kotval, six other Buena Vista players were selected as first-team players on the 1973 All-Iowa Conference football team: tight end Steve McPherson; interior offensive lineman Lyle Karsten; defensive linemen Tom Rouse and Kent Livermore; linebacker Tom McGrain; and defensive back Mike Pertzborn.
