= Blankenhorn =

Blankenhorn is a surname. Notable people with the surname include:

- David Blankenhorn (born 1955), American same-sex marriage opponent turned advocate
- Heber Blankenhorn (1884–1956), American journalist and union activist
- Herbert Blankenhorn (1904–1991), German diplomat
- Marion Blankenhorn (1885–1957), American college football coach and physician
- Travis Blankenhorn (born 1996), American baseball player
