= Buena Vista football, 1898–1909 =

American college football seasons

The Buena Vista football program from 1898 to 1909 represented Buena Vista College—now known as Buena Vista University—in its first years of college football competition. Buena Vista did not play intercollegiate games in 1906 or 1908.

== 1898 ==
1898 Buena Vista football
- Conference: Independent
- Record: 2–1
- Head coach: Unknown

The 1898 Buena Vista football team represented Buena Vista College of Storm Lake, Iowa. The team compiled a 2–1 record as an independent.

Against Morningside University, Buena Vista scored and went up 6–0, but the referee deemed it after time and negated the score after halftime. After the intermission, Buena Vista's players refused to take the field because the score was announced as 0–0 instead of 6–0 in Buena Vista's favor. The referee ultimately gave the game to Morningside which caused a brawl to ensue.

Date	Opponent	Site	Result	Attendance	Source
	vs. Storm Lake High School (IA)		W 11–0		
November 11	at Fonda Town Team	Fonda, IA	W 26–0		
November 24	Morningside	Storm, IA	L 0–0 (forfeit)		

== 1899 ==
1899 Buena Vista football
- Conference: Independent
- Record: 2–1
- Head coach: Unknown

The 1899 Buena Vista football team represented Buena Vista College of Storm Lake, Iowa. The team compiled a 2–1 record as an independent.

Date	Opponent	Site	Result	Attendance	Source
	vs. Denison Normal and Business		W 28–0		
October 9	at South Dakota	Vermillion, SD	L 5–26		
October 10	at Sioux City High School (IA)	Sioux City, IA; Riverside Park	W 28–5		

== 1900 ==
1900 Buena Vista football
- Conference: Independent
- Record: 4–1
- Head coach: A. W. Miller (1st season)

The 1900 Buena Vista football team represented Buena Vista College of Storm Lake, Iowa. The team compiled a 4–1 record as an independent. A. W. Miller, an older Buena Vista player served as the team's head coach; leading the team through practices throughout the season.

Date	Opponent	Site	Result	Attendance	Source
October 6	vs. South Dakota	Sioux Falls, IA	W 11–0		
	at Alta	Alta, IA	W 28–0		
	Sac City Institute	Storm Lake, IA	W 100–0		
November 10	at Sioux City High School (IA)	Sioux City, IA			
November 28	vs. Des Moines	Sac City, IA	L 0–40		
November 29	Des Moines	Storm Lake, IA	W 5–0		

== 1901 ==
1901 Buena Vista football
- Conference: Independent
- Record: 0–1
- Head coach: Unknown

The 1901 Buena Vista football team represented Buena Vista College of Storm Lake, Iowa. The team compiled a 0–1 record as an independent.

Date	Opponent	Site	Result	Attendance	Source
November 9	vs. Dakota University	Sioux City, IA	L 0–11		

== 1902 ==
1902 Buena Vista football
- Conference: Independent
- Record: 2–3
- Head coach: Billy Edson (1st season)

The 1902 Buena Vista football team represented Buena Vista College of Storm Lake, Iowa. In the team's first year under head coach Billy Edson, the team compiled a 2–3 record as an independent.

Date	Opponent	Site	Result	Attendance	Source
	at Alta	Alta, IA	L 0–6		
October 3	Des Moines	Storm Lake, IA	W 6–0		
October 17	Morningside	Storm Lake, IA	L 0–12		
November 8	at Morningside	Sioux City, IA	L 5–12		
November 27	Alta	Storm Lake, IA	W 16–0		

== 1903 ==
1903 Buena Vista football
- Conference: Independent
- Record: 3–3
- Head coach: Billy Edson (2nd season)

The 1903 Buena Vista football team represented Buena Vista College of Storm Lake, Iowa. In the team's second year under head coach Billy Edson, the team compiled a 3–3 record as an independent.

Date	Opponent	Site	Result	Attendance	Source
September 26	at Alta	Alta, IA	L 0–5		
October 3	Western Union	Storm Lake, IA	W 17–0		
October 9	at South Dakota	Vermillion, SD	L 0–5		
October 24	vs. Des Moines	Jefferson, IA	W 22–12		
October 31	Western Union	Le Mars, IA	Cancelled		
November 9	Highland Park (IA)	Storm Lake, IA	Cancelled		
November 14	at Iowa State "B" Team	Ames, IA	W 6–0		
November 26	Alta	Storm Lake, IA	L 0–5		

== 1904 ==
1904 Buena Vista football
- Conference: Independent
- Record: 5–2–1
- Head coach: Billy Edson (3rd season)
- Captain: Willcut

The 1904 Buena Vista football team represented Buena Vista College of Storm Lake, Iowa. In the team's third year under head coach Billy Edson, the team compiled a 5–2–1 record as an independent.

Date	Opponent	Site	Result	Attendance	Source
	at Morningside	Sioux City, IA	T 0–0		
October 1	at Drake	Des Moines, IA	L 0–18		
October 8	South Dakota	Storm Lake, IA	L 0–18		
October 14	Morningside	Storm Lake, IA	W 5–0		
	State Normal		W 56–6		
October 22	at Western Union	Le Mars, IA	W 21–0		
November 12	at Sac City Institute	Sac City, IA	W 29–0		
November 19	Western Union	Storm Lake, IA	W 52–0		

== 1905 ==
1905 Buena Vista football
- Conference: Independent
- Record: 0–1
- Head coach: Billy Edson (Note: Incorrectly referred to as Sam Edson) (4th season)

The 1905 Buena Vista football team represented Buena Vista College of Storm Lake, Iowa. In the team's fourth year under head coach Billy Edson, the team compiled a 0–1 record as an independent.

Date	Opponent	Site	Result	Attendance	Source
September 23	Drake	Storm Lake, IA	Scrimmage		
October 2	at Morningside	Sioux City, IA; Mizzou Park	Postponed		
October 7	at Morningside	Sioux City, IA; Mizzou Park	L 0–16		

== 1907 ==
1907 Buena Vista football
- Conference: Independent
- Record: 4–1–1
- Head coach: Billy Edson (5th season)

The 1907 Buena Vista football team represented Buena Vista College of Storm Lake, Iowa. In the team's fifth year under head coach Billy Edson, the team compiled a 4–1–1 record as an independent.

Date	Opponent	Site	Result	Attendance	Source
October 12	Sac City Institute	Storm Lake, IA	W 65–0		
October 19	vs. Humboldt College	Fort Dodge, IA	W 15–0		
October 26	Ellsworth	Storm Lake, IA	W 45–0		
November 2	at Highland Park (IA)	Des Moines, IA	L 12–16		
November 16	Drake		Cancelled		
November 22	Storm Lake Town Team		T 0–0		
November 28	Newell Indies		W 39–6		

Players

Buena Vista 1907 roster
Guards: Lloyd G. Crouch; Victor Hanson; Tackles: C. C. Sullivan; Allan O'Banion	Center: John Miller; Ends: Guy Joray; Treno Miller	Backs: Byrhl Carlton; Ben McCleery; Rollin Wheat

== 1909 ==
1909 Buena Vista football
- Conference: Independent
- Record: 2–2–1
- Head coach: Marion Blankenhorn (1st season)

The 1909 Buena Vista football team represented Buena Vista College of Storm Lake, Iowa. In the team's first year under head coach Marion Blankenhorn, the team compiled a 2–2–1 record as an independent.

Date	Opponent	Site	Result	Attendance	Source
October 4	Morningside	Storm Lake, IA	L 0–116		
October 30	Ellsworth	Storm Lake, IA	W 17–0		
November 5	Highland Park (IA)	Storm Lake, IA	T 0–0		
November 12	at Correctionville High School (IA)	Correctionville, IA	L 3–6		
November 25	Sac City High School (IA)	Storm Lake, IA	W 8–0		
