= Billy Edson =

American football player, coach, lawyer, and politician (1874–1965)

Biographical details
- Born: September 25, 1874; Wilton, Illinois, U.S.
- Died: March 5, 1965 (aged 90); Storm Lake, Iowa, U.S.
- Education: Buena Vista College (1896); Iowa State Normal School (1898, 1901)

Playing career
- 1894–1896: Buena Vista
- 1899–1900: Iowa
- Position: Halfback

Coaching career (HC unless noted)
- 1901: Iowa State Normals (assistant)
- 1902–1905: Buena Vista
- 1907: Buena Vista

Head coaching record
- Overall: 14–9–2

Willis Charles "Billy" Edson (September 25, 1874 – March 5, 1965) was an American college football player, coach, lawyer, and politician in Iowa. He was the head football coach for Buena Vista College—now known as Buena Vista University—from 1902 to 1904. He was a halfback on the University of Iowa's Big Ten championship team in 1900 and was the Speaker of the Iowa House of Representatives from 1925 to 1926.

== Playing career ==
Edson learned football while attending Buena Vista College from 1894 to 1896. He transferred to the University of Iowa, where he played two seasons on the football team and earned his bachelor's degree. Edson attended law school at the University of Iowa, earning his law degree in 1901.

Edson starred on two undefeated Hawkeye teams, in 1899 and 1900. As a junior in 1899, he helped Iowa to an 8–0–1 record, with the tie being a 5–5 draw against Amos Alonzo Stagg's Chicago Maroons team. Edson scored the game's only touchdown in the contest against Chicago. In the final game of the season, he scored five touchdowns for Iowa in a 58–0 victory over Illinois. At the end of the season, Iowa was admitted into the Western Conference, beginning in 1900.

As a senior in 1900, Edson helped lead Iowa to a Western Conference championship in its first year in the conference. He scored one touchdown in Iowa's first ever Western Conference, a 17–0 victory over Chicago, and he scored another touchdown the following week in a 28–5 victory over Michigan. In two years at Iowa, Edson scored 23 touchdowns, including seven of 50 yards or more.

== Legal and political career ==
After obtaining his law degree in 1901, Edson spent one season as an assistant football coach at the University of Northern Iowa before beginning a long and successful legal and political career. He practiced law in Storm Lake, Iowa, for over sixty years and was a member of the Iowa House of Representatives from 1919 to 1927. Edson served as the Speaker of the Iowa House of Representatives from 1925 to 1926 and was the Republican candidate for lieutenant governor of Iowa in 1936.

== Honors ==
Edson served for decades on the Board of Trustees at Buena Vista College. For his long-standing support of the college, Buena Vista renamed their gymnasium, Victory Hall, in his honor. Edson Hall is now used by Buena Vista's music department. For his athletic career, Billy Edson was inducted into the Iowa Sports Hall of Fame in 1959.

== Head coaching record ==
Year	Team	Overall	Conference	Standing	Bowl/playoffs
Buena Vista (Independent) (1902–1905)
1902	Buena Vista	2–3			
1903	Buena Vista	3–2			
1904	Buena Vista	5–2–1			
1905	Buena Vista	0–1			
Buena Vista (Independent) (1907)
1907	Buena Vista	4–1–1			
Buena Vista:		14–9–2			
Total:		14–9–2			
