= 1963 Luther Norse football team =

American college football season

1963 Luther Norse football

Iowa Conference champion
- Conference: Iowa Conference
- Record: 9–0 (8–0 Iowa)
- Head coach: Edsel Schweizer (12th season)

1963 Iowa Conference football standings
| | Conf. | | | | | Overall |
| Team | W | | L | | T | W | | L | | T |
|---|---|---|---|---|---|---|---|---|---|---|
| Luther $ | 8 | – | 0 | – | 0 | 9 | – | 0 | – | 0 |
| Central (IA) | 6 | – | 1 | – | 1 | 7 | – | 1 | – | 1 |
| Upper Iowa | 5 | – | 3 | – | 0 | 6 | – | 3 | – | 0 |
| Simpson (IA) | 5 | – | 3 | – | 0 | 5 | – | 4 | – | 0 |
| Dubuque | 3 | – | 4 | – | 1 | 3 | – | 4 | – | 1 |
| Buena Vista | 3 | – | 5 | – | 0 | 4 | – | 5 | – | 0 |
| Wartburg | 3 | – | 5 | – | 0 | 3 | – | 5 | – | 0 |
| Iowa Wesleyan | 2 | – | 6 | – | 0 | 2 | – | 7 | – | 0 |
| William Penn | 0 | – | 8 | – | 0 | 0 | – | 9 | – | 0 |
$ – Conference champion

The 1963 Luther Norse football team was an American football team that represented Luther College as a member of the Iowa Conference during the 1963 NAIA football season. In their 12th year under head coach Edsel Schweizer, the Norse compiled a perfect 9–0 record (8–0 against conference opponents), won the IC championship, and outscored opponents by a total of 315 to 53.

Fullback Jerry Wonders ranked second among the country's small-college players with 1,017 rushing yards. Wonders was selected as a second-team back on the Associated Press' 1963 Little All-America college football team.

Seven Luther players were selected to the 1963 All-Iowa Conference football team: bacs Jerry Wonders and Bob Naslund; ends Richard Ashland, Gary Lowmiller and Claude Jacobson; and tackles Charles Stern and Earl Jensen.

== Schedule ==
| Date | Opponent | Site | Result | Attendance | Source |
|---|---|---|---|---|---|
| September 14 | at Dubuque | Dubuque, IA | W 32–0 | | |
| September 21 | Wartburg | Decorah, IA | W 34–7 | 4,200 | |
| September 28 | at Upper Iowa | Fayette, IA | W 27–0 | 4,000 | |
| October 5 | William Penn | Decorah, IA | W 54–6 | | |
| October 12 | at Central (IA) | Pella, IA | W 14–7 | | |
| October 19 | Buena Vista | Decorah, IA | W 27–7 | | |
| October 26 | at Parsons* | Fairfield, IA | W 34–14 | | |
| November 2 | at Iowa Wesleyan | Mount Pleasant, IA | W 45–6 | | |
| November 9 | Simpson | Decorah, IA | W 48–6 | | |
*Non-conference game

== Personnel ==
The following players won varsity letters:

1. Tom Altmeler
2. Mel Ashland
3. Richard Ashland
4. Kenneth Belanger
5. Harold Bendicsen
6. John Benn
7. James Boyce
8. David Chellevold
9. John Cutting
10. Howard Dettloff
11. Dean Ellingson
12. Joseph Fillman
13. Harold Fish
14. Jay Geerdes
15. Dale Halverson
16. Richard Hemp
17. Gerald Holmmes
18. Dennis Ibbotson
19. George Indestad
20. Claude Jacobson
21. Earl Jensen
22. Peter Johnson
23. Steven Johnson
24. Francis Koch
25. John Lee
26. Gary Lowmiller
27. Robert Melcher
28. Steven Messer
29. Darryl Meyer
30. David Miller
31. Dennis Mitchell
32. Robert Naslund
33. David Nesset
34. Lowell Olsen
35. Paul Olsen
36. Steven Olson
37. Thomas Precious
38. David Sandeno
39. Stephen Schach
40. Russ Schneider
41. David Schreiber
42. Robert Schroeder
43. Ronald Schultz
44. David Solberg
45. Larry Staffon
46. John Stark
47. Charles Stern
48. Robert Thompson
49. Leallyn Turvold
50. Craig Williams
51. Jerry Wonders
