= Jay Anderson (American football, born 1970s) =

American football coach (born c. 1973)

Biographical details
- Born: c. 1973 (age 52–53); St. Charles, Iowa, U.S.
- Education: Drake University; Buena Vista University

Playing career
- 1991–1994: Drake
- Position: Quarterback

Coaching career (HC unless noted)
- 1995: Simpson (assistant)
- 1996: Simpson (PGC)
- 1997–1999: Buena Vista (GA)
- 2000–2005: Buena Vista (OC)
- 2006–2016: Buena Vista

Head coaching record
- Overall: 42–68

Accomplishments and honors

Awards
- IIAC Coach of the Year (2008)

Jay Anderson (born c. 1973) is an American former college football coach. He was the head football coach for Buena Vista University from 2006 to 2016.

== Career ==
Anderson was native of St. Charles, Iowa, and graduated from Interstate 35 High School. He played college football for Drake as a quarterback.

Anderson began his coaching career as an assistant for Simpson. He served as the passing game coordinator for their 1996 team that went 10–1. In 1997, he was joined Buena Vista as a graduate assistant working with wide receivers and defensive backs under head coach Joe Hadacheck. In 2000, he was promoted to offensive coordinator under first-year head coach Steve Osterberger. In 2006, following Osterberger being hired as the Loras head coach, Anderson was promoted to head football coach for Buena Vista. In eleven years as head coach he led the team to a 42–68 record and was named Iowa Conference Coach of the Year in 2008 after finishing the season 7–3 overall. He resigned following the 2016 season.

== Head coaching record ==
Year	Team	Overall	Conference	Standing	Bowl/playoffs
Buena Vista Beavers (Iowa Conference / Iowa Intercollegiate Athletic Conference) (2006–2016)
2006	Buena Vista	4–6	4–4	T–5th	
2007	Buena Vista	5–5	3–5	T–6th	
2008	Buena Vista	7–3	6–2	2nd	
2009	Buena Vista	4–6	3–5	6th	
2010	Buena Vista	3–7	2–6	T–7th	
2011	Buena Vista	2–8	2–6	7th	
2012	Buena Vista	4–6	4–3	T–2nd	
2013	Buena Vista	4–6	4–3	T–3rd	
2014	Buena Vista	5–5	4–3	T–3rd	
2015	Buena Vista	1–9	0–7	8th	
2016	Buena Vista	3–7	3–5	T–5th	
Buena Vista:		42–68	35–49		
Total:		42–68			
