= Joe Hadachek =

American football coach (born c. 1963)

Current position
- Title: Head coach
- Team: Vinton-Shellsburg HS (IA)
- Record: 0–10

Biographical details
- Born: c. 1963 (age 62–63); Dysart, Iowa, U.S.
- Education: University of Northern Iowa (1985)

Coaching career (HC unless noted)
- 1986–1987: Drake (GA)
- 1988–1989: Drake (OL)
- 1990–1995: Drake (OC)
- 1996–1999: Buena Vista
- 2007–2018: Union HS (IA)
- 2023: Union HS (IA) (assistant)
- 2024–present: Vinton-Shellsburg HS (IA)

Head coaching record
- Overall: 22–18 (college); 93–48 (high school)

Joseph Hadachek (born c. 1963) is an American college football coach. He is the head football coach for Vinton-Shellsburg High School, a position he has held since 2024. He was the head football coach for Buena Vista University from 1996 to 1999 and Union High School from 2007 to 2018. He also coached for Drake.

== Head coaching record ==
=== College ===
Year	Team	Overall	Conference	Standing	Bowl/playoffs
Buena Vista Beavers (Iowa Conference) (1996–1999)
1996	Buena Vista	5–5	4–4	5th	
1997	Buena Vista	3–7	3–5	T–6th	
1998	Buena Vista	7–3	7–3	T–3rd	
1999	Buena Vista	7–3	7–3	3rd	
Buena Vista:		22–18	21–15		
Total:		22–18			

=== High school ===
Year	Team	Overall	Conference	Standing	Bowl/playoffs
Union Knights () (2007–2018)
2007	Union	6–3	4–3	3rd	
2008	Union	7–3	5–2	3rd	
2009	Union	8–3	5–2	2nd	
2010	Union	9–1	9–0	1st	
2011	Union	12–2	5–2	2nd	
2012	Union	9–2	6–0	1st	
2013	Union	5–5	3–3	3rd	
2014	Union	8–3	6–0	1st	
2015	Union	4–6	4–2	3rd	
2016	Union	11–2	6–1	2nd	
2017	Union	8–4	5–2	3rd	
2018	Union	6–4	4–1	2nd	
Union:		93–38	62–18		
Vinton-Shellsburg Vikings () (2024–present)
2024	Vinton-Shellsburg	0–8	0–5	6th	
Vinton-Shellsburg:		0–8	0–5		
Total:		93–46			
National championship Conference title Conference division title or championship game berth
