= 1954 Luther Norse football team =

American college football season

1954 Luther Norse football

Iowa Conference champion
- Conference: Iowa Conference
- Record: 9–0 (6–0 Iowa)
- Head coach: Edsel Schweizer (3rd season)

1954 Iowa Conference football standings
	Conf.					Overall
Team	W		L		T	W		L		T
Luther $	6	–	0	–	0	9	–	0	–	0
Wartburg	5	–	1	–	0	5	–	2	–	1
Dubuque	4	–	1	–	1	4	–	3	–	1
Iowa Wesleyan	4	–	2	–	0	4	–	4	–	0
Buena Vista	3	–	2	–	1	5	–	3	–	1
Parsons	1	–	4	–	1	2	–	4	–	2
Central (IA)	1	–	5	–	0	3	–	5	–	0
Simpson (IA)	0	–	4	–	2	1	–	5	–	2
Upper Iowa	0	–	5	–	1	1	–	5	–	1
$ – Conference champion

The 1954 Luther Norse football team was an American football team that represented Luther College as a member of the Iowa Conference during the 1954 college football season. In their third year under head coach Edsel Schweizer, the Norse compiled a perfect 9–0 record (6–0 in conference games), won the conference championship, and outscored opponents by a total of 312 to 78.

Luther ranked fifth in the NAIA with an average of 395.5 yards of total offense (350 rushing, 45 passing) per game. On defense, Luther ranked third in the NAIA, limited opponents to an average of 66 rushing yards and 79 passing yards per game.

Six Luther players were selected as first-team players on the 1954 All-Iowa Conference football team: quarterback Dick Rundle; fullback Jack Schultz; halfback Don Nesheim; guards Bob Lee and Bob Pederson; tackle and Charles Engen. Two others received second-team honors: center Bill Losen and end Ken Vinge. Tackle Gene Ersland received honorable mention. Rundle and Schultz were selected as team captains for 1955. Nesheim led the team with 808 rushing yards and an average of 8.8 yards per carry. Schultz led the team in scoring with 72 points on 12 touchdowns. Rundle led in passing, completing 16 of 40 passes for 268 yards, three interceptions, and three touchdowns.

== Schedule ==
Date	Opponent	Site	Result	Attendance	Source
September 17	at Simpson	Indianola, IA	W 26–0		
September 25	Northland*	Decorah, IA	W 40–18		
October 2	at Buena Vista	Storm Lake, IA	W 19–0		
October 9	at Upper Iowa	Fayette, IA	W 32–13		
October 16	Wartburg^{†}	Decorah, IA	W 28–7		
October 23	Iowa Wesleyan	Decorah, IA	W 42–14	4,000	
October 30	at Augustana (IL)*	Ericson Field; Rock Island, IL	W 48–13		
November 6	Central (IA)	Decorah, IA	W 32–7		
November 13	Loras*	Decorah, IA	W 45–6		
*Non-conference game; ^{†}Homecoming
