= Wally Johnson =

Wally Johnson may refer to:

- Wally Johnson (footballer)
- Wally Johnson (coach)
