= Johnny Holm =

American singer

- Origin: Brainerd, Minnesota
- Occupation: Singer

Johnny Holm is an American singer. He is best known for his performances, both solo and as head of his eponymous band, in the Midwest. He is primarily a singer of cover songs, but has recorded his own albums and singles as well. His single "Lightnin' Bar Blues" charted at No. 100 on the Billboard Hot Country Songs chart.

== Biography ==
Holm was born in Fargo, North Dakota. KARE states he was born in the 1940s, while the North Dakota Music Hall of Fame lists him as having been born in 1951. He grew up in Brainerd, Minnesota, which he left after high school. He subsequently attended the Minnesota State University Moorhead, where he played basketball and studied special education. Starting in college, he began performing music, at first at parties, then at a bar and then at the local holiday inn. He recounted that one night, the state's governor Wendell Anderson, who was in attendance, instructed him to play an additional hour.

He continued performing, soon becoming, per the Associated Press, a "minor-league rock star". He primarily began playing covers, and was known for changing genre rapidly based on the mood of the crowd. He emphasized "work(ing) the crowd". He also began playing with a band, known as the Johnny Holm Band.

In the 1970s and 1980s, he also recorded five albums and some cassettes. Most notable of these singles and albums was his single "Lightnin' Bar Blues", a regional hit which made it to No. 100 on the Billboard Hot Country Songs chart. Another of his songs also charted nationally during the same period.

His performances were considered a campus tradition at Buena Vista University, which, as of 2013, he had performed at for 22 years. His missing a performance in 2012 due to health concerns was considered "unsettling" by some seniors.

As of 2026, at the age of 76, he continued to play 120 shows per year. His performances, still primarily of cover songs, continued to garner attention, including from the younger generation: many fans were young enough that, per KARE11, Holm "may well be older than... (their) grandparents".

In 2026, he released another album, which he described as "very personal", called Pam's Cafe. The album's title track is about a cafe of the same name he frequently visited on road trips. He subsequently performed the song for the cafe's owner, who had since suffered a brain injury, at her senior home in Battle Lake, Minnesota.

He was inducted into the Minnesota Music Hall of Fame in 1995 and into the North Dakota Music Hall of Fame in 2026. He performs songs from "all genres, all eras, all hits". He has gone through more than 65 band members, and also often invites member of the audience up to perform.
