= Bob Otto (coach) =

American football coach (1919–1993)

Biographical details
- Born: August 23, 1919; Wesley, Iowa, U.S.
- Died: November 7, 1993 (aged 74); Mankato, Minnesota, U.S.

Playing career

Football
- 1939–1941: Iowa
- Position: Tackle

Coaching career (HC unless noted)

Football
- 1947: Iowa (assistant freshmen)
- 1948–1952: Buena Vista
- 1953–1969: Mankato State

Basketball
- 1954–1955: Mankato State

Administrative career (AD unless noted)
- 1948–1953: Buena Vista
- 1953–1983: Mankato State

Head coaching record
- Overall: 97–90–9 (football); 18–4 (basketball)

Accomplishments and honors

Championships
- Football; 1 Iowa Conference (1952); 1 Iowa Conference North Division (1952); 5 MSCC/NIC (1958–1961, 1968) Basketball; 1 MSCC regular season (1955)

Awards
- MSU Hall of Fame (1981)

James Robert Otto (August 23, 1919 – November 7, 1993) was an American college football and college basketball coach and athletics administrator. He served as the head football coach at Buena Vista College—now known as Buena Vista University—in Storm Lake, Iowa from 1948 to 1952 and Mankato State College—now known as the Minnesota State University, Mankato—from 1953 to 1969.

A native of Fort Dodge, Iowa, Otto played football at the University of Iowa as a tackle from 1939 to 1941. Otto died from lung cancer, on November 7, 1993, at his home in Mankato, Minnesota.

== Head coaching record ==
=== Football ===
Year	Team	Overall	Conference	Standing	Bowl/playoffs
Buena Vista Beavers (Iowa Conference) (1948–1952)
1948	Buena Vista	4–3–1	1–2	7th	
1949	Buena Vista	4–4–1	1–3	T–8th	
1950	Buena Vista	6–3	3–2	3rd (Northern)	
1951	Buena Vista	5–4	3–2	3rd (Northern)	
1952	Buena Vista	5–5	2–1	1st (Northern)	
Buena Vista:		24–19–2	10—10		
Mankato State Indians (Minnesota State College Conference / Northern State College Conference / Northern Intercollegiate Conference) (1953–1968)
1953	Mankato State	1–7	1–3	T–4th	
1954	Mankato State	2–7	1–3	T–4th	
1955	Mankato State	4–5	3–1	2nd	
1956	Mankato State	6–2–1	1–2–1	4th	
1957	Mankato State	2–6–1	1–2–1	4th	
1958	Mankato State	7–2	5–0	1st	
1959	Mankato State	6–3	4–1	T–1st	
1960	Mankato State	5–3–1	4–0–1	1st	
1961	Mankato State	6–3	5–0	1st	
1962	Mankato State	4–4	3–2	2nd	
1963	Mankato State	4–4–1	3–2	T–3rd	
1964	Mankato State	2–7	1–4	5th	
1965	Mankato State	5–3–1	3–2	T–2nd	
1966	Mankato State	3–4–2	2–2–1	T–2nd	
1967	Mankato State	5–4	3–2	3rd	
1968	Mankato State	5–4	4–1	T–1st	
Mankato State Indians (NCAA College Division independent) (1969)
1969	Mankato State	6–3			
Mankato State:		73–71–7	44–27–4		
Total:		97–90–9			
National championship Conference title Conference division title or championship game berth
