= Hamlet Peterson =

American sports coach (1897–1973)

Biographical details
- Born: April 6, 1897; Scarville, Iowa, U.S.
- Died: October 2, 1973 (aged 76); Rochester, Minnesota, U.S.

Playing career

Football
- 1918–1922: Luther (IA)

Coaching career (HC unless noted)

Football
- 1925–1945: Luther (IA)

Basketball
- 1922–1965: Luther (IA)

Baseball
- 1967: Luther (IA)

Head coaching record
- Overall: 79–76–9 (football); 481–356 (basketball); 11–7 (baseball)

Accomplishments and honors

Championships
- Football; 4 Iowa Conference (1932, 1935, 1938, 1941)

Hamlet Edwin Peterson (April 6, 1897 – October 2, 1973) was an American football, basketball, and baseball coach. He served as the head football coach at Luther College in Decorah, Iowa from 1925 to 1945. Peterson was also the head basketball coach at Luther from 1922 to 1965 and the school's baseball coach in 1967.

Peterson died October 2, 1973, at a hospital in Rochester, Minnesota following treatment for cancer.

== Head coaching record ==
=== Football ===
| Year | Team | Overall | Conference | Standing | Bowl/playoffs |
|---|---|---|---|---|---|
Luther Norse (Iowa Conference) (1925–1945)
| 1925 | Luther | 3–4 | 0–2 | T–12th | |
| 1926 | Luther | 4–4 | 1–2 | 10th | |
| 1927 | Luther | 0–8 | 0–4 | T–13th | |
| 1928 | Luther | 6–2 | 5–2 | 3rd | |
| 1929 | Luther | 6–3 | 6–2 | T–2nd | |
| 1930 | Luther | 5–3 | 5–1 | 5th | |
| 1931 | Luther | 5–4 | 5–2 | 5th | |
| 1932 | Luther | 6–2 | 4–1 | 1st | |
| 1933 | Luther | 4–3 | 3–2 | T–8th | |
| 1934 | Luther | 3–3–2 | 2–1–2 | T–7th | |
| 1935 | Luther | 7–1 | 4–0 | 1st | |
| 1936 | Luther | 5–4 | 4–1 | T–3rd | |
| 1937 | Luther | 4–1–3 | 2–1–3 | 4th | |
| 1938 | Luther | 5–2–1 | 4–0–1 | 1st | |
| 1939 | Luther | 3–5 | 2–3 | 10th | |
| 1940 | Luther | 3–4–1 | 1–3 | 10th | |
| 1941 | Luther | 6–1–1 | 4–0–1 | 1st | |
| 1942 | Luther | 2–4–1 | 1–4 | T–11th | |
| 1943 | Luther | 0–2 | | | |
| 1944 | Luther | 0–4 | | | |
| 1945 | Luther | 2–5 | 1–3 | 7th | |
| Luther: | | 79–69–9 | 54–34–7 | | |
| Total: | | 79–69–9 | | | |
National championship Conference title Conference division title or championship game berth
