= Marion Blankenhorn =

American football coach and physician (1885–1957)

- Blankenhorn in 1939

Biographical details
- Born: November 13, 1885; Orrville, Ohio, U.S.
- Died: September 3, 1957 (aged 71); Clifton, Ohio, U.S.
- Education: College of Wooster (1909); Western Reserve University (1914)

Coaching career (HC unless noted)
- 1909: Buena Vista

Head coaching record
- Overall: 2–2–1

Marion Arthur Blankenhorn (November 13, 1885 – September 3, 1957) was an American college football coach and physician. He was the director of internal medicine for the University of Cincinnati Hospital and served as a physician in World War I and World War II. He was the head football coach for Buena Vista College—now known as Buena Vista University—in 1909.

== Coaching career ==
In 1909, right after graduating from the College of Wooster, Blankenhorn was hired as the head football coach for Buena Vista. In his lone season, he led the team to a 2–2–1 record including a 116 to 0 loss to Morningside.

== Medical and military career ==
While serving as head coach for Buena Vista, Blankenhorn also was a professor. After his brief stint with Buena Vista and after he earned his doctorate, he was named an associate professor for Western Reserve. In 1929, he was promoted to professor and right-hand man for Charles Franklin Hoover, where he served until he went to the University of Cincinnati in 1935. In, 1935 he was named director of the Medical Department at Cincinnati General Hospital—now known as University of Cincinnati Health. His primary focus was on liver and blood diseases. In 1936, he was chosen to study hospital standards in medicine for the American College of Physicians.

Before enlisting in World War I, Blankenhorn was an intern and resident physician for Lakeside Hospital. During the war, he served as a first lieutenant and was listed as a staff physician for the Medical Officers Reserve Corps under director George Washington Crile and assistant director Charles Franklin Hoover. He enlisted in World War II and worked on aviation medicine for the United States Army and later as an investigator in Europe while teaching for the Surgeon General's Office in the Far East.

Blankenhorn was known for developing the University of Cincinnati's Department of Internal Medicine and his twenty-year tenure as the department's director.

== Personal life, education, and honors ==
Blankenhorn was born on November 13, 1885, in Orrville, Ohio, to Henry Blankenhorn, who was a physician, and Emma Amstutz. He grew up in Cincinnati. Blankenhorn had four siblings, including journalist, psychological warfare innovator, and union activist Heber Blankenhorn. In 1909, he graduated from the College of Wooster. In 1914, he earned his Doctor of Medicine from Western Reserve University. He and his wife, Martha, had two daughters and a son.

In 1939, Blankenhorn was nominated for a Nobel Prize in Physiology or Medicine by Primo Dorello and Osvaldo Polimanti.

Blankenhorn was a member of the Association of American Physicians and Surgeons (AAPS), American Medical Association (AMA), and a diplomate of the American Board of Internal Medicine (ABIM).

Blankenhorn retired in 1955 from the University of Cincinnati with the title of professor emeritus. In May 1957, shortly before his death, he received an honorary doctorate of humane letters.

Blankenhorn died on September 3, 1957, in his home in Clifton, Ohio, after a several-month-long battle with an illness. At the time of his death, he left behind his wife, three children, and ten grandchildren. His memorial services were held in the Seventh Presbyterian Church.

== Head coaching record ==
Year	Team	Overall	Conference	Standing	Bowl/playoffs
Buena Vista (Independent) (1909)
1909	Buena Vista	2–2–1			
Buena Vista:		2–2–1			
Total:		2–2–1			
