= Jim Hershberger =

American athletic director and football coach (1934–2002)

Biographical details
- Born: May 13, 1934; Kalona, Iowa, U.S.
- Died: January 25, 2002 (aged 67); Des Moines, Iowa, U.S.
- Education: Northeast Missouri State

Playing career
- 1953–1956: Iowa State Teachers
- Positions: Back, end, tackle

Coaching career (HC unless noted)
- 1957–1958: Janesville HS (WI)
- 1959–1965: Algona HS (IA)
- 1966: Northeast Missouri State (GA)
- 1967–1968: Illinois State (OL)
- 1969: Illinois State (OC/OL)
- 1970–1982: Buena Vista
- 1984–1989: Buena Vista

Administrative career (AD unless noted)
- 1989–1994: Buena Vista

Head coaching record
- Overall: 118–61–1 (college); 37–21–6 (high school)
- Bowls: 1–0
- Tournaments: 1–2 (NCAA D-III playoffs)

Accomplishments and honors

Championships
- 3 Iowa Conference (1972–1973, 1978)

Awards
- Buena Vista Hall of Fame (2001); 5× Iowa Conference Coach of the Year (1971, 1973, 1976, 1983, 1986)

James Monroe Hershberger (May 13, 1934 – January 25, 2002) was an American athletic director and college football coach. He was the head football coach for Buena Vista College—now known as Buena Vista University—from 1970 to 1982 and from 1984 to 1989.

== Early life and playing career ==
Hershberger was born on May 13, 1934, in Kalona, Iowa, to Edward and Edna Hershberger. He attended Kalona High School. He lettered in football, basketball, and track and field. He played college football for Iowa State Teachers—now known as Northern Iowa—as a back, end, and tackle.

== Coaching career ==
Following Hershberger's college graduation, he was named head football coach for Janesville High School—now known as Joseph A. Craig High School. In two seasons as head coach, he led the team to a 12–3–1 record. In 1959, he was hired to be the head football coach for Algona High School. In seven seasons as head coach, he led the team to a 25–19–5 record including a conference title and a 7–0–1 record in 1961. He joined Northeast Missouri State—now known as Truman—as a graduate assistant while he worked on his master's degree. In 1967, Hershberger was named the offensive line coach for Illinois State. In 1969, he was promoted to offensive coordinator while maintaining his role as offensive line coach.

In 1970, Hershberger was named the head football coach for Buena Vista. After finishing his first season 1–8, he led the school to eleven consecutive winning seasons, which included three Iowa Conference titles, in 1972, 1973, and 1978. In 1975, Buena Vista finished with an overall record of 8–2 and won the Boot Hill Bowl. The following year the team finished 8–2–1 and reached the NCAA Division III Semifinal for the school's first-ever Division III playoff appearance. He retired from coaching following the 1989 season. In twenty seasons with Buena Vista he led them to an overall record of 118–61–1 and won Iowa Conference Coach of the Year honors five times.

Following Hershberger's retirement from coaching, he was named athletic director for Buena Vista. He served in the role until his complete retirement in 1994.

== Personal life and honors ==
In 2001, Hershberger was inducted into the Buena Vista Hall of Fame.

On June 16, 1957, Hershberger married Floy Baumgartner. They had three sons together.

== Health and death ==
In 1983, during a game against Dubuque, Hershberger suffered a heart attack. He was treated at Mercy Hospital and was in critical condition. He died on January 25, 2002, at the Iowa Methodist Medical Center in Des Moines, Iowa from cancer and heart disease.

== Head coaching record ==
=== College ===
Year	Team	Overall	Conference	Standing	Bowl/playoffs	NAIA D2^{#}	D3^{°}
Buena Vista Beavers (Iowa Conference) (1970–1982)
1970	Buena Vista	1–8	1–6	T–7th			
1971	Buena Vista	6–2	5–2	T–2nd			
1972	Buena Vista	7–2	6–1	T–1st		T–14	
1973	Buena Vista	8–1	7–0	1st		9	
1974	Buena Vista	5–4	4–3	T–3rd			
1975	Buena Vista	8–2	6–1	2nd	W Boot Hill	9	
1976	Buena Vista	8–2–1	5–1–1	2nd	L NCAA Division III Semifinal		
1977	Buena Vista	7–2	5–2	3rd			
1978	Buena Vista	7–2	5–2	T–1st			
1979	Buena Vista	7–2	6–1	2nd			
1980	Buena Vista	6–3	5–2	T–2nd			
1981	Buena Vista	7–2	5–2	2nd			
1982	Buena Vista	4–5	3–4	5th			
Buena Vista Beavers (Iowa Conference) (1984–1989)
1984	Buena Vista	7–3	5–2	T–2nd			
1985	Buena Vista	4–6	2–5	T–5th			
1986	Buena Vista	9–2	7–1	2nd	L NCAA Division III First Round		T–15
1987	Buena Vista	5–5	5–3	3rd			
1988	Buena Vista	7–3	5–3	3rd			
1989	Buena Vista	5–5	3–5	T–6th			
Buena Vista:		118–61–1	90–46–1				
Total:		118–61–1					
National championship Conference title Conference division title or championship game berth

=== High school ===
Year	Team	Overall	Conference	Standing	Bowl/playoffs
Janesville Cougars () (1957–1958)
Janesville:		12–3–1			
Algona Bulldogs () (1959–1965)
1959	Algona	2–4–2			
1960	Algona	5–3			
1961	Algona	7–0–1		1st	
1962	Algona	1–6–1			
1963	Algona	4–3–1			
1964	Algona	6–2			
Algona:		25–19–5			
Total:		37–21–6			
National championship Conference title Conference division title or championship game berth
