= Walter Jewell =

American football player and coach (1896–1980)

Biographical details
- Born: February 24, 1896; Iowa, U.S.
- Died: January 27, 1980 (aged 83); Decorah, Iowa, U.S.
- Education: Iowa (JD, 1919)

Playing career
- 1917: Iowa
- Position: Tackle

Coaching career (HC unless noted)
- 1919: Luther
- 1921: Allerton HS (IA)

Walter W. Jewell (February 24, 1896 – January 27, 1980) was an American football player and coach.

Jewell played college football as a tackle at the University of Iowa, lettering in 1917. He graduated from the University of Iowa with a J.D. degree in 1919.

In the fall of 1919, he was hired as the head football coach at Luther College in Decorah, Iowa. The program had been discontinued, and Jewell was charged with building a football team out of students who had "practically no experience". On October 11, 1919, Jewell led the team to a 29 to 6 victory in Luther's first college football game in 20 years. Jewell was the head coach at Luther for three months from September to November 1919.

Jewell taught and coached at a high school in Allerton, Iowa from 1921 to 1922 and practiced law in Decorah starting in 1919. Jewell died at Winneshiek County Memorial Hospital in Decorah, on January 27, 1980.
