= Andre D. Wagner =

American photographer

Andre D. Wagner (born 1983) is an American photographer, living in Bushwick, Brooklyn, New York. His black and white street and documentary style photographs primarily depict African Americans living in Brooklyn.

== Life and work ==
Wagner was born in Omaha, Nebraska in 1986. He gained a BA in Social Work from Buena Vista University, Storm Lake, Iowa in 2010. In 2011 he moved from Omaha to Bushwick, Brooklyn, New York to study for a master's degree in social work.

A review by Leah Ollman in the Los Angeles Times described Wagner as practising "a quiet, lyrical kind of humanism that comes straight out of the traditions of mid-20th-century street photography and the social documentary photo-essay." He primarily photographs African Americans living in Brooklyn, but also elsewhere in New York City. His book Here For The Ride (2017) documents people on the New York City Subway, between 2013 and 2016.

Wagner has undertaken commissions for Vogue, ESPN, New York magazine and The New York Times, and created the promotional images for the film Queen & Slim (2019). In August 2020 he was made one of four Public Artists in Residence (PAIR) with the New York City Department of Cultural Affairs, a year long civic art program that enables artists "to propose and implement creative solutions to pressing civic challenges."

He uses a Leica M6 camera with a 28 mm wide-angle lens and Kodak Tri-X black and white film, and makes his own prints.

== Publications ==
=== Books of work by Wagner ===
- Black Boys. Copenhagen: Creative Future, 2013.
- The Purist Vol. 1. New York City: self-published, 2014.
- Here For The Ride. Copenhagen: Creative Future, 2017. With an introduction by Miles Hodges. Contains an insert with an essay by Zun Lee ("The Quiet Power of the Quotidian"), an interview with Wagner, and photographs. Edition of 750 copies.

=== Other publications by Wagner ===
- The Purist – Parades Vol. 2. New York City: self-published, 2015. Newspaper format.

== Exhibitions ==
=== Solo exhibitions ===
- American Survey Pt. 2 Tell It Like It Is, Papillion Art, Los Angeles, California, 2015

=== Group exhibitions ===
- Men of Change: Power. Triumph. Truth., Smithsonian Institution, Washington, D.C., 2019
