= Kevin Twait =

American football coach, athletics administrator

Playing career
- 1981–1984: Buena Vista

Coaching career (HC unless noted)
- 1985–1986: Southwest Missouri State (GA)
- 1987: Greenwood Lab (MO) (DC)
- 1988: Benton HS (IA) (DC)
- 1989: Storm Lake HS (IA)
- 1990–1995: Buena Vista
- 1996–2017: Iowa Central

Administrative career (AD unless noted)
- 2017–2025: Iowa Central

Head coaching record
- Overall: 12–44 (college); 140–94 (junior college)
- Bowls: 11–5 (junior college)
- Tournaments: 4 ICCAC (1997, 2002–2004); 1 MFC (2005)<nr>3 MFC West Division (2006–2008)

Kevin Twait is an American former football coach and college athletics administrator. He served as the head football coach for Buena Vista University in Storm Lake, Iowa from 1990 to 1995 and Iowa Central Community College in Fort Dodge, Iowa from 1996 to 2017. Twait was also the athletic director at Iowa Central from 2017 to 2025.

Twait attended Emmetsburg High School in Emmetsburg, Iowa, where he played football on teams coached by his father, Duane.

== Head coaching record ==
=== College ===
Year	Team	Overall	Conference	Standing	Bowl/playoffs
Buena Vista Beavers (Iowa Conference) (1990–1995)
1990	Buena Vista	1–9	1–7	8th	
1991	Buena Vista	1–9	1–7	T–8th	
1992	Buena Vista	2–7	2–6	7th	
1993	Buena Vista	3–6	3–5	T–5th	
1994	Buena Vista	3–6	3–5	6th	
1995	Buena Vista	2–7	2–6	T–6th	
Buena Vista:		12–44	12–36		
Total:		12–44			

== Head coaching record ==
Year	Team	Overall	Conference	Standing	Bowl/playoffs	NJCAA^{#}
Iowa Central Tritons (Iowa Junior College Conference / Iowa Community College Athletic Conference) (1996–2004)
1996	Iowa Central	5–5	2–3	4th		
1997	Iowa Central	7–2	4–0	1st	W Pepsi Cola Bowl	
1998	Iowa Central	8–3	6–2	1st	L Pepsi Cola Bowl	
1999	Iowa Central	8–3	5–3	2nd	W Pepsi Cola Bowl	
2000	Iowa Central	6–5	4–4	2nd	W Pepsi Cola Bowl	
2001	Iowa Central	7–3	6–2	2nd		
2002	Iowa Central	8–3	7–1	1st	L Graphic Edge Bowl	
2003	Iowa Central	10–1	6–0	1st	L Graphic Edge Bowl	
2004	Iowa Central	7–4	4–2	T–1st	L Graphic Edge Bowl	
Iowa Central Tritons (Midwest Football Conference) (2005–2013)
2005	Iowa Central	9–2	6–2	2nd	W Graphic Edge Bowl	
2006	Iowa Central	9–2	7–1	1st (West)	W Graphic Edge Bowl	
2007	Iowa Central	9–2	7–1	1st (West)	W Graphic Edge Bowl	
2008	Iowa Central	8–3	5–3	2nd (West)	W Graphic Edge Bowl	8
2009	Iowa Central	6–3	5–3	2nd (West)		
2010	Iowa Central	7–3	4–3	3rd (West)	W North Star Bowl	
2011	Iowa Central	6–4	3–4	T–2nd	W Graph Edge Bowl	
2012	Iowa Central	6–5	1–3	4th	L Salt City Bowl	
2013	Iowa Central	6–5	3–5	3rd	W Graphic Edge Bowl	
Iowa Central Tritons (Iowa Community College Athletic Conference) (2014–2017)
2014	Iowa Central	5–7	1–1	2nd	W Graphic Edge Bowl	
2015	Iowa Central	2–8	0–2	3rd		
2016	Iowa Central	0–11	0–2	3rd		
2017	Iowa Central	1–10	0–2	3rd		
Iowa Central:		140–94	86–49			
Total:		140–94				
National championship Conference title Conference division title or championship game berth
