= Edsel Schweizer =

American football coach and administrator (1923–2003)

Biographical details
- Born: February 5, 1923; Chester, Illinois, U.S.
- Died: February 22, 2003 (aged 80); Decorah, Iowa, U.S.

Playing career

Football
- 1941–1942: Iowa

Basketball
- 1943–1944: Purdue

Coaching career (HC unless noted)

Football
- 1946–1949: St. Louis Lutheran HS (MO)
- 1950: Luther (backfield)
- 1952–1977: Luther

Basketball
- 1950–1961: Luther (assistant)

Administrative career (AD unless noted)
- 1966–1984: Luther

Head coaching record
- Overall: 150–70–6 (college)
- Bowls: 1–1

Accomplishments and honors

Championships
- 6 Iowa Conference (1954, 1957, 1960, 1963, 1970–1971)

Awards
- 2× Iowa Conference Coach of the Year (1970–1971)

Edsel K. Schweizer (February 5, 1923 – April 22, 2003) was an American football coach and college athletics administrator. He served as the head football coach at Luther College in Decorah, Iowa from 1952 to 1977, compiling a record of 150–70–6.

Schweizer came to Luther College in 1950, when he was hired as backfield coach for the football team, assistant basketball coach, track coach, dean of students, and instructor in the education department. After a recall to active duty in the United States Marine Corp in 1951, Schweizer returned to Luther in 1952 as head coach in football and track, assistant coach in basketball, and professor of psychology. He also served as the school's athletic director from 1966 until he retired in 1984. Schweizer died of cancer on April 22, 2003.

== Head coaching record ==
=== College ===
Year	Team	Overall	Conference	Standing	Bowl/playoffs
Luther Norse (Iowa Conference) (1952–1955)
1952	Luther	3–5	2–1	2nd (Northern)	
1953	Luther	5–3	3–1	2nd (Northern)	
1954	Luther	9–0	6–0	1st	
1955	Luther	9–0–1	5–0–1	2nd	W Corn
1956	Luther	5–3–1	5–2–1	T–2nd	
1957	Luther	8–1	7–1	1st	
1958	Luther	7–1–1	6–1–1	2nd	
1959	Luther	6–3	6–2	3rd	
1960	Luther	8–1	7–1	T–1st	
1961	Luther	6–3	6–2	2nd	
1962	Luther	6–2–1	6–2–1	3rd	
1963	Luther	9–0	8–0	1st	
1964	Luther	6–3	6–2	3rd	
1965	Luther	6–3	6–1	2nd	
1966	Luther	7–2	6–1	2nd	
1967	Luther	4–4–1	4–2–1	3rd	
1968	Luther	2–7	1–6	8th	
1969	Luther	7–2	5–2	2nd	
1970	Luther	8–2	6–1	1st	L Stagg
1971	Luther	8–1	6–1	1st	
1972	Luther	3–6	3–4	5th	
1973	Luther	2–6–1	2–4–1	6th	
1974	Luther	3–6	3–4	5th	
1975	Luther	4–5	4–3	T–3rd	
1976	Luther	4–5	4–3	4th	
1977	Luther	5–5	3–4	T–4th	
Luther:		150–70–6	126–51–6		
Total:		150–70–6			
National championship Conference title Conference division title or championship game berth
