= Austin Dickinson (American football) =

American football coach (born c. 1988)

Current position
- Title: Head coach
- Team: Buena Vista
- Conference: ARC
- Record: 9–31

Biographical details
- Born: c. 1988 (age 37–38); Woodbine, Iowa, U.S.
- Education: Buena Vista University (2010); Minot State University (2019)

Playing career
- 2006–2009: Buena Vista
- Position: Defensive tackle

Coaching career (HC unless noted)
- 2010–2011: Minot State (GA/OL/TE)
- 2012–2013: Buena Vista (OL)
- 2014–2016: Buena Vista (DL)
- 2017: North Dakota (OQC)
- 2018–2019: Minnesota State (DL)
- 2020–2022: Wisconsin–Eau Claire (DC/LB)
- 2023–present: Buena Vista

Head coaching record
- Overall: 9–31

Austin Dickinson (born c. 1988) is an American college football coach. He is the head football coach for Buena Vista University, a position he has held since 2023.

== Playing career ==
Dickinson played college football for Buena Vista from 2006 to 2009. During his four-year career he was a four-time letterwinner at defensive tackle while registering 123 total tackles and fourteen tackles for loss. As a senior in 2009 he had 45 total tackles and a career-high 6.5 tackles for loss.

== Coaching career ==
Dickinson began his coaching career on the offensive side of the ball as a graduate assistant, offensive line, and tight ends coach for Minot State. He returned to his alma mater in 2012 as the team's offensive line coach before transitioning into the defensive line coach for the 2014 season. For a single season in 2017 he was an assistant coach with North Dakota before joining Minnesota State for his second stint as a defensive line coach. In 2020 he was hired by Wisconsin–Eau Claire where he was the defensive coordinator.

On December 21, 2022, Dickinson was hired by Buena Vista as their head coach.

== Head coaching record ==
Year	Team	Overall	Conference	Standing	Bowl/playoffs
Buena Vista Beavers (American Rivers Conference) (2023–present)
2023	Buena Vista	2–8	2–6	T–6th	
2024	Buena Vista	2–8	2–6	T–6th	
2025	Buena Vista	3–7	2–6	7th	
2026	Buena Vista	2–8	1–6	7th	
Buena Vista:		9–31	7–24		
Total:		8–30			

== See also ==
- List of current NCAA Division III football coaches
