= Priscillah Ruzibuka =

Rwandan female entrepreneur (born 1991)

- Born: 1991 (age 34–35); Rwanda
- Education: Buena Vista University (Bachelor of Arts in Visual Communication and Graphic Design)
- Occupation: Entrepreneur
- Years active: 1999 — present
- Known for: Women empowerment and Ki-pepeo Kids Clothing
- Title: Founder & Chief executive of Ki-pepeo Kids Clothing

Priscillah Umutashya Ruzibuka (born 1991) is a Rwandan female entrepreneur who founded Ki-pepeo Kids Clothing, a social enterprise with the aim to help underprivileged women.

== Early life and education ==
Priscillah Ruzibuka was the third child born to a Catholic family. She was born in Rwanda, but at a young age she and her family relocated to the neighboring country, Tanzania. They later returned to Rwanda.

Ruzibuka holds a Bachelor of Science in Information Technology Engineering from Multimedia University in Malaysia and a master's degree in Project management from Oklahoma Christian University in the United States.

== Career ==
Priscillah Ruzibuka worked in the private sector for two years before becoming an entrepreneur in January 2016. She currently works with former female street vendors, former housemaids and other women from underprivileged communities to help them through her social enterprise, Ki-pepeo Kids Clothing. Ruzibuka trains the women in tailoring and lets them profit from the sale of the clothes by paying fair salaries.

Ruzibuka was inspired by her family's former housemaid, who received tailoring training from Ruzibuka's mother and later used those skills as an entrepreneur in Tanzania.

Ruzibuka believes that many women are still in poverty not because they don't have the capacity to work, but because they didn't get the education and materials they needed. Some lack simple tailoring machines, others don't have the capital to start small businesses. This is the reason behind the name Ki-pepeo (a Kiswahili word meaning "butterfly" in English), referring to the process of transformation from an rather unattractive caterpillar to a beautiful butterfly.

== Grants and awards ==
- Startup grant of $800 from Akili Dada programs
- Africa Business Idea Cup: Best business idea award
- 5th place at the East Africa Regional Competition
- Participant in the Business and Entrepreneurship Track of YALI Regional Leadership Center East Africa
- Pollination Project grant of $1000
- Fund of $10,000 from the United States African Development Foundation
- Queens Young Leaders 2018 winner

== Role models ==
Ruzibuka has said her biggest role model is her mother. Other role models include Strive Masiyiwam, a London-based Zimbabwe businessman, entrepreneur and philanthropist, and Paul Kagame, the president of Rwanda.
