= Dakota-Iowa Athletic Conference =

The Dakota-Iowa Athletic Conference was a short-lived intercollegiate athletic conference that existed from 1946 to 1949. The league had members in Iowa and South Dakota.

== Champions ==
- 1946 – Westmar and Yankton
- 1947 – Buena Vista and Western Union
- 1948 – Buena Vista

== See also ==
- List of defunct college football conferences
