= Wally Johnson (coach) =

American football and wrestling coach (1915–2007)

Biographical details
- Born: 1915; Detroit Lakes, Minnesota, U.S.
- Died: January 27, 2007; Minneapolis, Minnesota, U.S.

Playing career

Football
- 1937: Minnesota

Wrestling
- 1941–1942: Minnesota

Coaching career (HC unless noted)

Football
- 1950–1951: Luther (IA)
- 1952–1971: Minnesota (assistant)

Wrestling
- 1947–1950: South Dakota State
- 1950–1952: Luther (IA)
- 1952–1986: Minnesota

Head coaching record
- Overall: 8–10 (football); 392–209–11 (Minnesota wrestling duals)

Accomplishments and honors

Championships
- Wrestling; 2 Big Ten (1957, 1959)

Awards
- NCAA Wrestling Coach of the Year (1976); Minnesota Wrestling Hall of Fame (1977); National Wrestling Hall of Fame (1985)

Wallace T. Johnson (1915 – January 27, 2007) was an American football and wrestling coach.

== Playing career ==
Johnson played football for one year in 1937 at the University of Minnesota before a broken leg ended his career. He instead turned to wrestling where he excelled.

== Coaching career ==
Johnson served as a wrestling coach at South Dakota State in Brookings, South Dakota, before starting the wrestling program at Luther College in Decorah, Iowa where he was also the head football coach.

Johnson left Luther in 1952 to become the head wrestling coach at the University of Minnesota, where he would serve until his retirement in 1986. He was also an assistant football coach for the first 20 years he coach at U of M.

== Head coaching record ==
=== Football ===
Year	Team	Overall	Conference	Standing	Bowl/playoffs
Luther Norse (Iowa Conference) (1950–1951)
1950	Luther	1–7	1–4	5th (Northern)	
1951	Luther	6–3	4–1	2nd (Northern)	
Luther:		8–10	5–5		
Total:		8–10			
