= Grant Mollring =

American football coach (born 1979)

Biographical details
- Born: c. 1979 (age 46–47); Cambridge, Nebraska, U.S.
- Education: University of Nebraska at Kearney (2003, 2010)

Coaching career (HC unless noted)
- 2004–2006: Eustis–Farnam HS (NE) (assistant)
- 2007: Nebraska–Kearney (GA)
- 2008–2009: Nebraska–Kearney (WR)
- 2010–2013: Doane (OC/QB)
- 2014–2016: Hastings (AHC/OC/QB)
- 2017–2022: Buena Vista

Head coaching record
- Overall: 16–34

Grant Mollring (born c. 1979) is an American football coach. He was the head coach for the Buena Vista Beavers football team from 2017 to 2022. He was previously an assistant for Hastings, Doane, Nebraska–Kearney, and Eustis–Farnam High School.

== Head coaching record ==
Year	Team	Overall	Conference	Standing	Bowl/playoffs
Buena Vista Beavers (Iowa Intercollegiate Athletic Conference / American Rivers Conference) (2017–2022)
2017	Buena Vista	3–7	2–6	T–7th	
2018	Buena Vista	1–9	0–8	T–9th	
2019	Buena Vista	3–7	1–7	T–7th	
2020–21	No team—COVID-19				
2021	Buena Vista	5–5	4–4	T–4th	
2022	Buena Vista	4–6	3–5	6th	
Buena Vista:		16–34	10–30		
Total:		16–34			
