= Steve Osterberger =

American football coach (born 1969)

Biographical details
- Born: c. 1969 (age 56–57); Dubuque, Iowa, U.S.
- Education: Drake University (1990); Buena Vista University (2000)

Coaching career (HC unless noted)
- 1992–1993: Drake (GA)
- 1994–1995: Simpson (QB/LB)
- 1996–1999: Buena Vista (OC)
- 2000–2005: Buena Vista
- 2006–2010: Loras
- 2016–2018: Wahlert Catholic HS (IA) (OC)

Head coaching record
- Overall: 51–59

Steven J. Osterberger (born c. 1969) is an American former college football coach. He was the head football coach for Buena Vista University from 2000 to 2005 and Loras College from 2006 to 2010. He also coached for Drake, Simpson, and Wahlert Catholic High School.

== Head coaching record ==
| Year | Team | Overall | Conference | Standing | Bowl/playoffs |
|---|---|---|---|---|---|
Buena Vista Beavers (Iowa Conference) (2000–2005)
| 2000 | Buena Vista | 7–3 | 7–3 | 3rd | |
| 2001 | Buena Vista | 5–5 | 4–5 | T–5th | |
| 2002 | Buena Vista | 3–7 | 3–6 | T–6th | |
| 2003 | Buena Vista | 6–4 | 4–4 | T–4th | |
| 2004 | Buena Vista | 6–4 | 5–3 | T–3rd | |
| 2005 | Buena Vista | 5–5 | 4–5 | 5th | |
| Buena Vista: | | 32–28 | 27–26 | | |
Loras Duhawks (Iowa Conference) (2006–2010)
| 2006 | Loras | 4–6 | 4–4 | T–5th | |
| 2007 | Loras | 2–8 | 1–7 | 8th | |
| 2008 | Loras | 6–4 | 5–3 | T–3rd | |
| 2009 | Loras | 2–8 | 2–6 | T–6th | |
| 2010 | Loras | 5–5 | 4–4 | T–4th | |
| Loras: | | 19–31 | 16–24 | | |
| Total: | | 51–59 | | | |
