= Highland Park College =

College in Des Moines, Iowa, USA

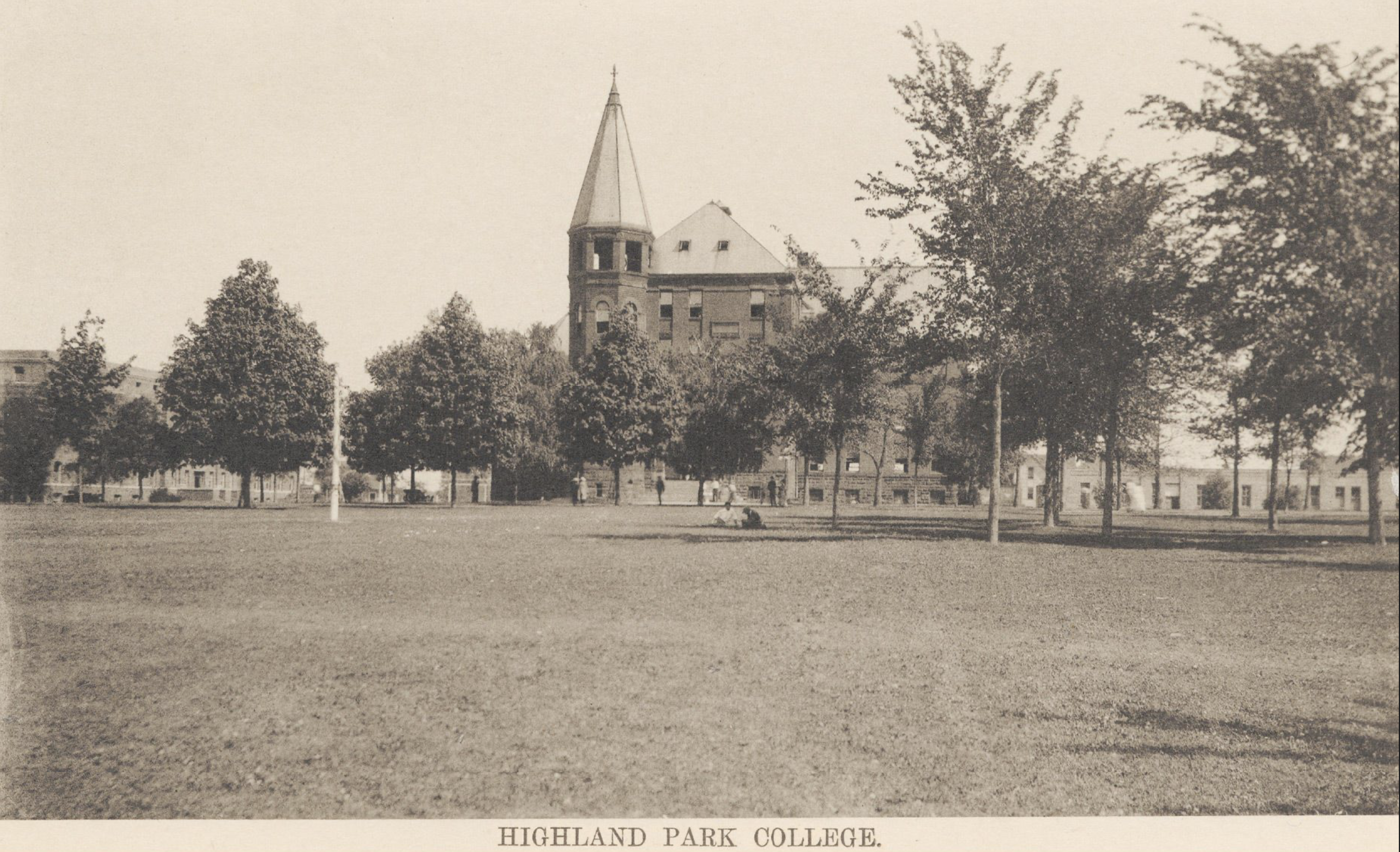
- Type: Not-for-profit Private University
- Active: 1890–1918
- Location: Des Moines, Iowa, United States
- Campus: Urban

Highland Park College was a college located in Des Moines, Iowa.

== History ==
Founded by a local business syndicate, Highland Park opened its doors in 1890. At the time, Highland Park was an emerging northern suburb of the capital city. Enrollment climbed in its early years before a dip following the Panic of 1893; enrollment later stabilized around 2,000 students.

In 1911, the previously independent college was sold to the Presbyterian Church.

In 1918, the college merged with Des Moines College and Central University of Iowa to form a new Des Moines University on the Highland Park campus. That successor institute closed in 1929; today, the campus site has a shopping mall.
