= Union High School (Iowa) =

Public secondary school in La Porte City, Iowa, United States

Coordinates: 42.314°N 92.199°W

Location
- 200 Adams Street; La Porte City, Iowa 50651; United States

Information
- Type: Public Secondary School
- Superintendent: John Howard
- Principal: Jason Toenges
- Staff: 26.87 (FTE)
- Grades: 9-12
- Enrollment: 315 (2023-2024)
- Student to teacher ratio: 11.72
- Colors: Red, Black, Silver
- Athletics conference: North Iowa Cedar-East Conference
- Mascot: Knight
- Website: www.union.k12.ia.us

Union High School is a small rural public high school in La Porte City, Iowa part of the Union Community School District. Union High School enrolled 324 students in the 2021-22 school year. The school day is divided into six periods while the school year functions on three twelve-week trimesters. Drew Hemesath, bassist for American hardcore band Method, graduated from Union High School in 2008.

There are a wide variety of extra-curricular activities at Union including Fine Arts Programs and Varsity Athletics. The Union Speech Team has distinguished itself by winning multiple Speech Banners at the All-State level.

== Athletics ==
The Knights compete in the North Iowa Cedar League Conference in the following sports:

- Bowling
- Cross Country
  - Girls' 5-time Class 2A State Champions (2001, 2007, 2008, 2009, 2010)
- Volleyball
- Football
  - 2011 Class 3A State Champions
- Basketball
- Wrestling
  - 2-time Class 2A State Duals Champions (2004, 2015)
- Track and Field
- Golf
- Baseball
- Softball
- Soccer
- Tennis

== See also ==
- List of high schools in Iowa
