= Heber Blankenhorn =

American journalist (1884–1956)

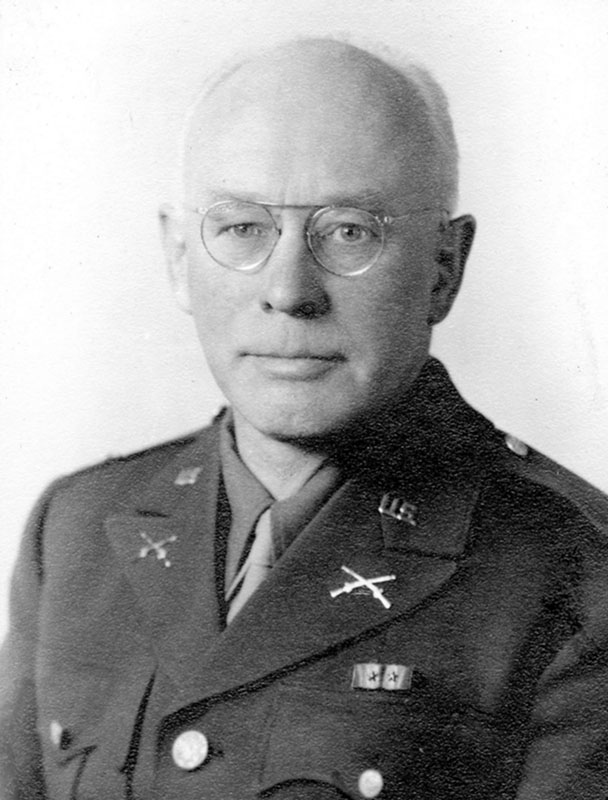
- Blankenhorn as a Colonel during WW2
- Born: March 26, 1884; Orrville, OH
- Died: January 1, 1956 (aged 71); Alexandria, VA
- Burial place: Arlington National Cemetery, Arlington, VA
- Education: College of Wooster; Columbia University
- Spouse(s): Mary Dewhurst (m. 1913) Ann Washington (m. 1936)
- Military career
- Allegiance: United States of America
- Branch: United States Army
- Service years: 1917-1919 A.E.F. 1942-1946 (U.S. Army)
- Rank: Colonel
- Units: American Expeditionary Forces; Morale Operations Branch; Ninth U.S. Army
- Conflicts: World War I World War II
- Awards: Legion of Merit (2)

Heber Blankenhorn (March 26, 1884 – January 1, 1956) was an American journalist, labor investigator, and United States Army officer. He served in psychological warfare roles in both world wars, leading the Army's Psychologic Subsection and the American Expeditionary Forces Propaganda Section during World War I, and later serving with the Office of Strategic Services, Allied Force Headquarters, the Psychological Warfare Division at SHAEF, and Ninth United States Army during World War II.

== Background ==
Heber Holbrook Blankenhorn was born in Orrville, Ohio, on March 26, 1884. In 1905, he obtained a BA from the College of Wooster. In 1910, he received an MA in history from Columbia University.

== Career ==
=== Journalism ===
In 1910, Blankenhorn joined the staff of the New York Evening Sun. By 1914, he had become assistant city editor. He followed labor issues, unions, and strikes.

He served as a propaganda expert in France during World War I.

=== Labor activist ===
In 1919, he became co-director of the Bureau of Industrial Research. He worked directly with the Interchurch World Movement and, through it, the Steel Strike of 1919. In 1921, he also served as acting publicity director for the Amalgamated Clothing Workers' Union, where he helped establish the New York Leader.

By the early 1920s the Socialist Party was in severe membership decline and funding of the New York Call became correspondingly tenuous. In a last-ditch effort to save the paper, it was reorganized in the fall of 1923 to include non-Socialists in its management. On October 1, 1923, the name of the paper was formally changed to the New York Leader as a reflection of this new orientation. Pacifist minister Norman Thomas, formerly of The World Tomorrow, was named as editor of the publication. Heber Blankenhorn became managing editor, Evans Clark business manager, and Ed Sullivan sportswriter. This effort to stabilize the daily newspaper's funding was unsuccessful, however, and the New York Leader was terminated just six weeks later.

From 1921 to 1924, he wrote two books on steel unions and contributed to labor journals. In 1924, he joined the staff of Labor magazine.

=== Federal service ===
In 1935, he accepted a position on the public relations staff for the National Recovery Act. He became an assistant to Senator Robert F. Wagner and helped pass the National Labor Relations Act. He went on to serve as industrial economist to chairmen of the National Labor Relations Board and the La Follette Committee for its hearings on the Ford Motor Company.

He returned to service for the U.S. Army during World War II (1942–1946) on a psychological warfare team and reached the rank of colonel.

In 1946, he returned to service on the National Labor Relations Board and resigned in 1947.

=== Return to federal service ===
In 1949, he directed a UAW investigation into attempted assassinations of Victor and Walter Reuther.

=== Return to journalism ===
In the 1950s, he returned to journalism, based in Europe on staff to Labor magazine, then retired to Alexandria, Virginia, to write his memoirs.

== Personal life and death ==
In 1936, Blankenhorn married Ann Washington. Blankenhorn's brother, Marion Blankenhorn, also served in both World Wars and served as a physician in Ohio.

He died on January 1, 1956, at home in Alexandria, Virginia.

== Awards ==
Blankenhorn received the Legion of Merit for service during World War II.

In 2014, he received posthumous recognition as a Distinguished Member of the PSYOP Regiment (DMOR).

In 2015, he received posthumous recognition from U.S. Army's John F. Kennedy Special Warfare Center and School as the "original Silver Knight" of the PSYOP Regiment.

== Legacy: Psychological Warfare ==
Blankenhorn served as captain of the Psychologic Subsection (a.k.a. "Propaganda Subsection") (February–July 1918) in Military Intelligence Branch and then Propaganda Section (August–November 1918) during World War I. They had no directions or instructions. He led by improvisation 28 men to produce three million copies of 21 separate leaflets. He returned for similar service during World War II.

== Works ==
Books: Blankenhorn had not finished memoirs at his death in 1956:

- Adventures in Propaganda (Boston: Houghton Mifflin, 1919)
- The Strike for Union New York, 1923

Articles:

- "Newspapers in Wartime" (1918)
- "Marching Through West Virginia" (1921)
- "After West Virginia - Somerset" (1922)
- "Industrial Munitions: Report on Labor Policing Equipment in Industrial Plants" (1937)

== See also ==
- Psychological Operations (United States)
- Psychological warfare
- Special Operations Command

== Sources ==
- "The Heber Blankenhorn Collection" (PDF). Wayne State University. April 1971.
- Gall, Gilbert J. (August 2007). "Heber Blankenhorn: The Publicist as Reformer". Historian.
- Gall, Gilbert J. (3 July 2008). "Heber Blankenhorn, the La Follette committee, and the Irony of Industrial Repression". Labor History. pp. 246–253.
- Harper's Magazine
- Social Networks and Archival Index
