= Luther Norse football =

College football team

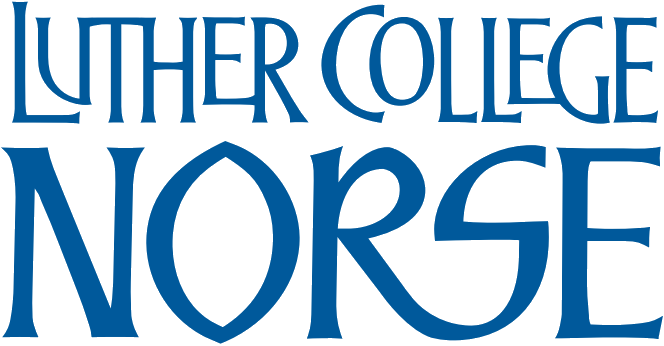
- First season: 1892; 134 years ago
- Athletic director: Renae Hartl
- Head coach: Joe Troche; 4th season, 4–38 (.095)
- Location: Decorah, Iowa
- Stadium: Carlson Stadium (capacity: 5,000)
- Field: Legacy Field
- NCAA division: Division III
- Conference: MWC
- Colors: Blue and Black
- All-time record: 448–444–21 (.502)

Conference championships
- 11
- Mascot: Norse
- Website: luthernorse.com

The Luther Norse football team represents Luther College in college football at the NCAA Division III level. The Norse are former members of the American Rivers Conference (ARC) from 1922 when it was the Iowa Intercollegiate Athletic Conference (IIAC) to 2026. On July 1, 2026, Luther College joined the Midwest Conference (MWC). The Norse play their home games at Carlson Stadium in Decorah, Iowa.

The team's head coach is Joe Troche, who took over the position for the 2022 season.

== Conference affiliations ==
- Club team (1892–1894, 1896)
- Army training corps (1918)
- Independent (1919–1921)
- Iowa Intercollegiate Athletic Conference (1922–2017; rebranded)
- American Rivers Conference (2018–2026)
- Midwest Conference (2026-Present)

== Championships ==
=== Conference championships ===
Luther claims 11 conference titles, the most recent of which came in 1978.

Year	Conference	Overall Record	Conference Record	Coach
1932	Iowa Conference	6–2	4–1	Hamlet Peterson
1935	Iowa Conference	7–1	4–0	Hamlet Peterson
1938	Iowa Conference	5–2–1	4–0–1	Hamlet Peterson
1941	Iowa Conference	6–1–1	4–0–1	Hamlet Peterson
1954	Iowa Conference	9–0	6–0	Edsel Schweizer
1957	Iowa Conference	8–1	7–1	Edsel Schweizer
1960†	Iowa Conference	8–1	7–1	Edsel Schweizer
1963	Iowa Conference	9–0	8–0	Edsel Schweizer
1970	Iowa Conference	8–2	6–1	Edsel Schweizer
1971	Iowa Conference	8–1	6–1	Edsel Schweizer
1978†	Iowa Conference	6–3	5–2	Bob Naslund

† Co-champions

== Bowl games ==
Luther has participated in two bowl games, and has a record of 1–1.

Season	Coach	Bowl	Opponent	Result
1955	Edsel Schweizer	Corn Bowl	Western Illinois	W 24–21
1970	Edsel Schweizer	Stagg Bowl	Capital	L 21–34

== List of head coaches ==
=== Key ===
Key to symbols in coaches list
General		Overall		Conference		Postseason (Note: Although the first Rose Bowl Game was played in 1902, it has been continuously played since the 1916 game, and is recognized as the oldest bowl game by the NCAA. "—" indicates any season prior to 1916 when postseason games were not played.)	
No.	Order of coaches (Note: A running total of the number of head coaches, with coaches who served separate tenures being counted only once. Interim head coaches are represented with "Int" and are not counted in the running total. "—" indicates the team played but either without a coach or no coach is on record. "X" indicates an interim year without play.)	GC	Games coached	CW	Conference wins	PW	Postseason wins
DC	Division championships	OW	Overall wins	CL	Conference losses	PL	Postseason losses
CC	Conference championships	OL	Overall losses	CT	Conference ties	PT	Postseason ties
NC	National championships	OT	Overall ties (Note: Overtime rules in college football were introduced in 1996, making ties impossible in the period since.)	C%	Conference winning percentage		
†	Elected to the College Football Hall of Fame	O%	Overall winning percentage (Note: When computing the win–loss percentage, a tie counts as half a win and half a loss.)				

=== Coaches ===
List of head football coaches showing season(s) coached, overall records, conference records, postseason records, championships and selected awards
No.	Name	Season(s)	GC	OW	OL	OT	O%	CW	CL	CT	C%	PW	PL	PT	DC	CC	NC	Awards
1	Walter Jewell	1919	6	2	4	0	0.333	–	–	–	–	–	–	–	–	–	–	–
2	Oscar Solem	1920	7	5	1	1	0.786	–	–	–	–	–	–	–	–	–	–	–
3	Ivan Doseff	1921	6	2	4	0	0.333	–	–	–	–	–	–	–	–	–	–	–
4	Franklin Cappon	1922–1924	22	11	8	3	0.568	–	–	–	–	–	–	–	–	–	–	–
5	Hamlet Peterson	1925–1945	156	80	67	9	0.542	–	–	–	–	–	–	–	–	–	–	–
6	Robert Bungum	1946–1949	34	9	23	2	0.294	–	–	–	–	–	–	–	–	–	–	–
7	Wally Johnson	1950–1951	17	7	10	0	0.412	–	–	–	–	–	–	–	–	–	–	–
8	Edsel Schweizer	1952–1977	234	150	78	6	0.654	–	–	–	–	–	–	–	–	–	–	–
9	Bob Nashlund	1978–1995	169	90	79	0	0.533	–	–	–	–	–	–	–	–	–	–	–
10	Brad Pole	1996–2001	60	20	40	0	0.333	–	–	–	–	–	–	–	–	–	–	–
11	Paul Hefty	2002–2007	60	29	31	0	0.483	–	–	–	–	–	–	–	–	–	–	–
12	Mike Durnin	2008–2012	50	18	32	0	0.360	–	–	–	–	–	–	–	–	–	–	–
13	Aaron Hafber	2013–2017	50	20	30	0	0.400	–	–	–	–	–	–	–	–	–	–	–
14	Caleb Padilla	2018–2021	31	2	29	0	0.065	–	–	–	–	–	–	–	–	–	–	–
15	Joe Troche	2022–present	42	4	38	0	0.095	2	30	0	0.0625	–	–	–	–	–	–	–

== Year-by-year results ==
National champions	Conference champions	Bowl game berth	Playoff berth

Season	Year	Head coach	Association	Division	Conference	Record							Postseason	Final ranking
Season	Year	Head coach	Association	Division	Conference	Overall			Conference				Postseason	Final ranking
Season	Year	Head coach	Association	Division	Conference	Win	Loss	Tie	Finish	Win	Loss	Tie	Postseason	Final ranking
Luther Norse
1892	1892	Club team												
1893	1893	Club team												
1894	1894	Club team												
No team in 1895
1896	1896	Club team												
No team from 1897 to 1917
Army training corps 1918
1919	1919	Walter Jewell	NCAA		Independent	2	4	0					—	—
1920	1920	Oscar Solem	NCAA		Independent	5	1	1					—	—
1921	1921	Ivan Doseff	NCAA		Independent	2	4	0					—	—
1922	1922	Franklin Cappon	NCAA		IIAC	3	4	0					—	—
1923	1923	Franklin Cappon	NCAA		IIAC	4	1	2					—	—
1924	1924	Franklin Cappon	NCAA		IIAC	4	3	1					—	—
1925	1925	Hamlet Peterson	NCAA		IIAC	3	4	0					—	—
1926	1926	Hamlet Peterson	NCAA		IIAC	4	4	0					—	—
1927	1927	Hamlet Peterson	NCAA		IIAC	0	8	0					—	—
1928	1928	Hamlet Peterson	NCAA		IIAC	6	2	0					—	—
1929	1929	Hamlet Peterson	NCAA		IIAC	6	3	0					—	—
1930	1930	Hamlet Peterson	NCAA		IIAC	5	3	0					—	—
1931	1931	Hamlet Peterson	NCAA		IIAC	5	4	0					—	—
1932	1932	Hamlet Peterson	NCAA		IIAC	6	2	0					Conference champions	—
1933	1933	Hamlet Peterson	NCAA		IIAC	4	3	0					—	—
1934	1934	Hamlet Peterson	NCAA		IIAC	3	3	2					—	—
1935	1935	Hamlet Peterson	NCAA		IIAC	7	1	0					Conference champions	—
1936	1936	Hamlet Peterson	NCAA		IIAC	5	4	0					—	—
1937	1937	Hamlet Peterson	NCAA		IIAC	4	1	3					—	—
1938	1938	Hamlet Peterson	NCAA		IIAC	5	2	1					Conference champions	—
1939	1939	Hamlet Peterson	NCAA		IIAC	3	5	0					—	—
1940	1940	Hamlet Peterson	NCAA		IIAC	3	4	1					—	—
1941	1941	Hamlet Peterson	NCAA		IIAC	6	1	1					Conference champions	—
1942	1942	Hamlet Peterson	NCAA		IIAC	3	3	1					—	—
1943	1943	Hamlet Peterson	NCAA		IIAC	0	2	0					—	—
1944	1944	Hamlet Peterson	NCAA		IIAC	0	4	0					—	—
1945	1945	Hamlet Peterson	NCAA		IIAC	2	4	0					—	—
1946	1946	Robert Bungum	NCAA		IIAC	3	6	0					—	—
1947	1947	Robert Bungum	NCAA		IIAC	1	7	1					—	—
1948	1948	Robert Bungum	NCAA		IIAC	3	5	0					—	—
1949	1949	Robert Bungum	NCAA		IIAC	2	5	1					—	—
1950	1950	Wally Johnson	NCAA		IIAC	1	7	0					—	—
1951	1951	Wally Johnson	NCAA		IIAC	6	3	0					—	—
1952	1952	Edsel Schweizer	NCAA		IIAC	3	5	0					—	—
1953	1953	Edsel Schweizer	NCAA		IIAC	5	3	0					—	—
1954	1954	Edsel Schweizer	NCAA		IIAC	9	0	0					Conference champions	—
1955	1955	Edsel Schweizer	NCAA		IIAC	9	0	1					—	—
1956	1956	Edsel Schweizer	NCAA	College Division	IIAC	5	3	1					—	—
1957	1957	Edsel Schweizer	NCAA	College Division	IIAC	8	1	0					Conference champions	—
1958	1958	Edsel Schweizer	NCAA	College Division	IIAC	7	1	1					—	—
1959	1959	Edsel Schweizer	NCAA	College Division	IIAC	6	3	0					—	—
1960	1960	Edsel Schweizer	NCAA	College Division	IIAC	8	1	0					Conference champions	—
1961	1961	Edsel Schweizer	NCAA	College Division	IIAC	6	3	0					—	—
1962	1962	Edsel Schweizer	NCAA	College Division	IIAC	6	2	1					—	—
1963	1963	Edsel Schweizer	NCAA	College Division	IIAC	9	0	0					Conference champions	—
1964	1964	Edsel Schweizer	NCAA	College Division	IIAC	6	3	0					—	—
1965	1965	Edsel Schweizer	NCAA	College Division	IIAC	6	3	0					—	—
1966	1966	Edsel Schweizer	NCAA	College Division	IIAC	7	2	0					—	—
1967	1967	Edsel Schweizer	NCAA	College Division	IIAC	4	4	1					—	—
1968	1968	Edsel Schweizer	NCAA	College Division	IIAC	2	7	0					—	—
1969	1969	Edsel Schweizer	NCAA	College Division	IIAC	7	2	0					—	—
1970	1970	Edsel Schweizer	NCAA	College Division	IIAC	8	2	0					Conference champions	—
1971	1971	Edsel Schweizer	NCAA	College Division	IIAC	8	1	0					Conference champions	—
1972	1972	Edsel Schweizer	NCAA	College Division	IIAC	3	6	0					—	—
1973	1973	Edsel Schweizer	NCAA	Division III	IIAC	2	5	1					—	—
1974	1974	Edsel Schweizer	NCAA	Division III	IIAC	3	6	0					—	—
1975	1975	Edsel Schweizer	NCAA	Division III	IIAC	4	5	0					—	—
1976	1976	Edsel Schweizer	NCAA	Division III	IIAC	4	5	0					—	—
1977	1977	Edsel Schweizer	NCAA	Division III	IIAC	5	5	0					—	—
1978	1978	Bob Naslund	NCAA	Division III	IIAC	6	3	0					Conference champions	—
1979	1979	Bob Naslund	NCAA	Division III	IIAC	3	6	0					—	—
1980	1980	Bob Naslund	NCAA	Division III	IIAC	6	3	0					—	—
1981	1981	Bob Naslund	NCAA	Division III	IIAC	4	5	0					—	—
1982	1982	Bob Naslund	NCAA	Division III	IIAC	6	3	0					—	—
1983	1983	Bob Naslund	NCAA	Division III	IIAC	5	4	0					—	—
1984	1984	Bob Naslund	NCAA	Division III	IIAC	5	4	0					—	—
1985	1985	Bob Naslund	NCAA	Division III	IIAC	5	5	0					—	—
1986	1986	Bob Naslund	NCAA	Division III	IIAC	7	3	0					—	—
1987	1987	Bob Naslund	NCAA	Division III	IIAC	8	2	0					—	—
1988	1988	Bob Naslund	NCAA	Division III	IIAC	4	6	0					—	—
1989	1989	Bob Naslund	NCAA	Division III	IIAC	4	6	0					—	—
1990	1990	Bob Naslund	NCAA	Division III	IIAC	4	5	0					—	—
1991	1991	Bob Naslund	NCAA	Division III	IIAC	6	3	0					—	—
1992	1992	Bob Naslund	NCAA	Division III	IIAC	6	4	0					—	—
1993	1993	Bob Naslund	NCAA	Division III	IIAC	5	5	0					—	—
1994	1994	Bob Naslund	NCAA	Division III	IIAC	4	6	0					—	—
1995	1995	Bob Naslund	NCAA	Division III	IIAC	2	6	0					—	—
1996	1996	Brad Pole	NCAA	Division III	IIAC	3	7	0					—	—
1997	1997	Brad Pole	NCAA	Division III	IIAC	4	6	0					—	—
1998	1998	Brad Pole	NCAA	Division III	IIAC	3	7	0					—	—
1999	1999	Brad Pole	NCAA	Division III	IIAC	2	8	0					—	—
2000	2000	Brad Pole	NCAA	Division III	IIAC	5	5	0					—	—
2001	2001	Brad Pole	NCAA	Division III	IIAC	3	7	0					—	—
2002	2002	Paul Hefty	NCAA	Division III	IIAC	4	6	0					—	—
2003	2003	Paul Hefty	NCAA	Division III	IIAC	6	4	0					—	—
2004	2004	Paul Hefty	NCAA	Division III	IIAC	6	4	0					—	—
2005	2005	Paul Hefty	NCAA	Division III	IIAC	6	4	0					—	—
2006	2006	Paul Hefty	NCAA	Division III	IIAC	2	8	0					—	—
2007	2007	Paul Hefty	NCAA	Division III	IIAC	5	5	0					—	—
2008	2008	Mike Durnin	NCAA	Division III	IIAC	5	5	0					—	—
2009	2009	Mike Durnin	NCAA	Division III	IIAC	5	5	0					—	—
2010	2010	Mike Durnin	NCAA	Division III	IIAC	5	5	0					—	—
2011	2011	Mike Durnin	NCAA	Division III	IIAC	3	7	0					—	—
2012	2012	Mike Durnin	NCAA	Division III	IIAC	0	10	0					—	—
2013	2013	Aaron Hafner	NCAA	Division III	IIAC	2	8	0					—	—
2014	2014	Aaron Hafner	NCAA	Division III	IIAC	5	5	0					—	—
2015	2015	Aaron Hafner	NCAA	Division III	IIAC	4	6	0					—	—
2016	2016	Aaron Hafner	NCAA	Division III	IIAC	3	7	0					—	—
2017	2017	Aaron Hafner	NCAA	Division III	IIAC	6	4	0					—	—
2018	2018	Caleb Padilla	NCAA	Division III	A-R-C	1	9	0					—	—
2019	2019	Caleb Padilla	NCAA	Division III	A-R-C	1	9	0					—	—
2020–21	2020–21	Caleb Padilla	NCAA	Division III	A-R-C	0	1	0					—	—
2021	2021	Caleb Padilla	NCAA	Division III	A-R-C	0	10	0					—	—
2022	2022	Joe Troche	NCAA	Division III	A-R-C	2	8	0					—	—
2023	2023	Joe Troche	NCAA	Division III	A-R-C	0	10	0					—	—
2024	2024	Joe Troche	NCAA	Division III	A-R-C	1	9	0					—	—
2025	2025	Joe Troche	NCAA	Division III	A-R-C	0	10	0					—	—
2026	2026	Joe Troche	NCAA	Division III	MWC	1	1	0					—	—
