= Buena Vista Beavers football =

College football team

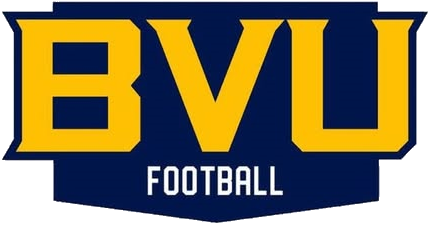
- First season: 1898; 128 years ago
- Athletic director: Amy Maier
- Head coach: Austin Dickinson; 3rd season, 7–23 (.233)
- Location: Storm Lake, Iowa
- Stadium: J. Leslie Rollins Stadium (capacity: 3,000)
- NCAA division: Division III
- Conference: ARC
- Colors: Navy and gold
- All-time record: 474–510–30 (.482)
- Bowl record: 1–0 (1.000)

Conference championships
- DIAC: 1947 Iowa Conference: 1952, 1972, 1973, 1978
- Mascot: Beaver
- Website: bvuathletics.com

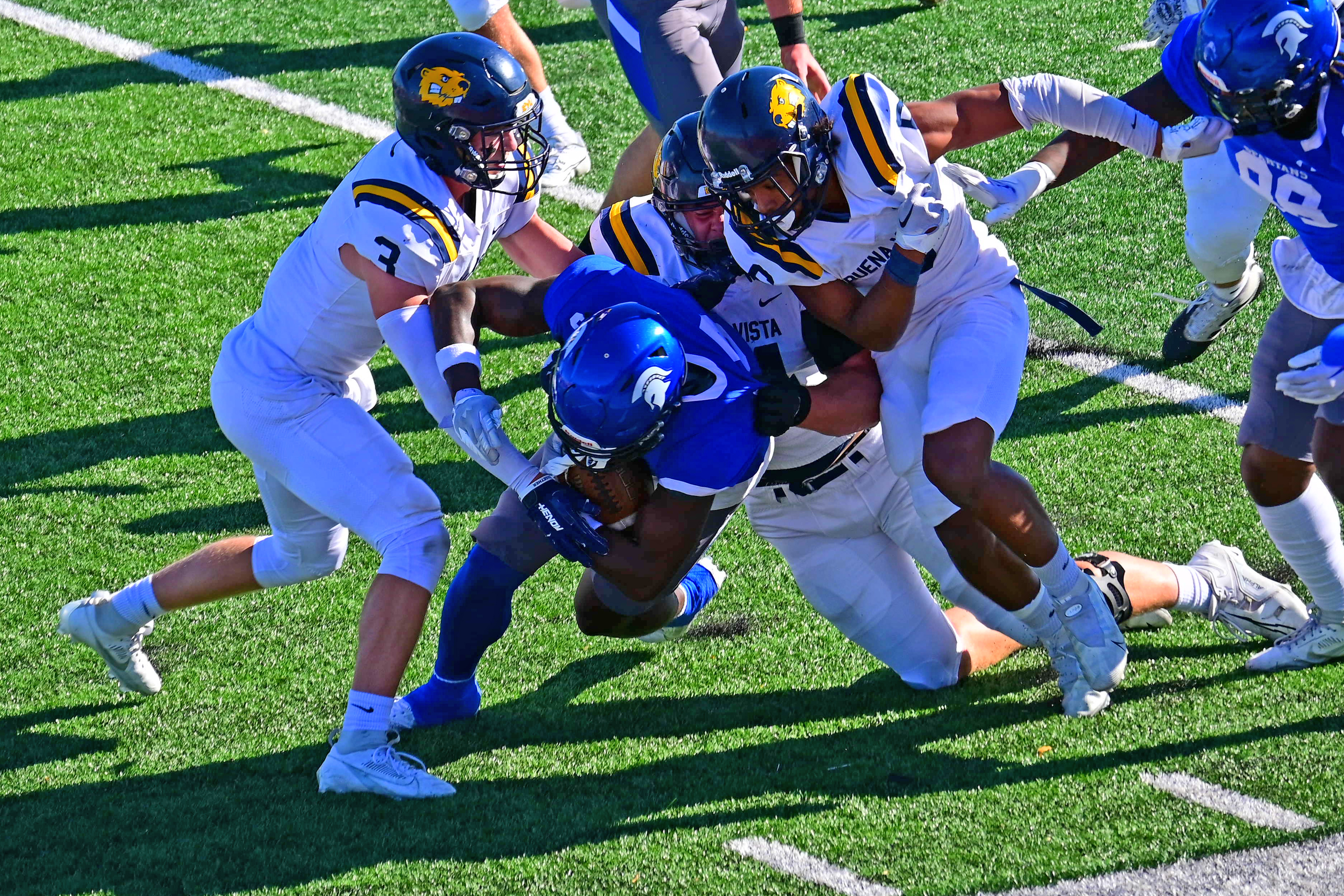
Beavers defenders tackle a Dubuque player during a 2023 game

The Buena Vista Beavers football team represents Buena Vista University in college football at the NCAA Division III level. The Beavers are members of the American Rivers Conference (ARC), fielding its team in the A-R-C since 1923 when the conference was branded as the Iowa Intercollegiate Athletic Conference (IIAC). The Beavers play their home games at J. Leslie Rollins Stadium in Storm Lake, Iowa.

The team's head coach is Austin Dickinson, who took over the position for the 2023 season.

== Conference affiliations ==
- Iowa Intercollegiate Athletic Conference (1923–2017; rebranded)
- American Rivers Conference (2018–present)

== Championships ==
=== Conference championships ===
Buena Vista claims 4 conference titles, the most recent of which came in 1978.

Year	Conference	Overall Record	Conference Record	Coach
1952	Iowa Conference	5–5	2–1	Bob Otto
1972†	Iowa Conference	7–2	6–1	Jim Hershberger
1973†	Iowa Conference	8–1	7–0	Jim Hershberger
1978	Iowa Conference	7–2	5–2	Jim Hershberger

† Co-champions

=== Division championships ===
Year	Division	Coach	Overall Record	Conference Record	Opponent	CG result
1952	IIAC Northern Division	Bob Otto	5–5	2–1	Iowa Wesleyan	W 13–7

== Postseason games ==
=== NCAA Division III playoff games ===
The Beavers have appeared in the Division III playoffs two times with an overall record of 1–2.

Season	Coach	Playoff	Opponent	Result
1976	Jim Hershberger	Quarterfinals; Semifinals	Carroll; Saint John's	W 20–14^{OT} L 0–61
1986	Jim Hershberger	Quarterfinals	Central	L 0–37

== Year-by-year results since 1976 ==
National champions	Conference champions	Bowl game berth	Playoff berth

Season	Year	Head coach	Association	Division	Conference	Record							Postseason	Final ranking
Season	Year	Head coach	Association	Division	Conference	Overall			Conference				Postseason	Final ranking
Season	Year	Head coach	Association	Division	Conference	Win	Loss	Tie	Finish	Win	Loss	Tie	Postseason	Final ranking
Buena Vista Beavers
1976	1976	Jim Hershberger	NCAA	Division III	IIAC	7	1	1	2nd	5	1	1	Playoff berth	—
1977	1977	Jim Hershberger	NCAA	Division III	IIAC	7	2	0	3rd	5	2	0	—	—
1978	1978	Jim Hershberger	NCAA	Division III	IIAC	7	2	0	T–1st	5	2	0	Conference co-champions	—
1979	1979	Jim Hershberger	NCAA	Division III	IIAC	7	2	0	2nd	6	1	0	—	—
1980	1980	Jim Hershberger	NCAA	Division III	IIAC	6	3	0	T–2nd	5	2	0	—	—
1981	1981	Jim Hershberger	NCAA	Division III	IIAC	7	2	0	T–2nd	5	2	0	—	—
1982	1982	Jim Hershberger	NCAA	Division III	IIAC	4	5	0	5th	3	4	0	—	—
1983	1983	Jim Hershberger	NCAA	Division III	IIAC	6	4	0	3rd	5	2	0	—	—
1984	1984	Jim Hershberger	NCAA	Division III	IIAC	7	3	0	T–2nd	5	2	0	—	—
1985	1985	Jim Hershberger	NCAA	Division III	IIAC	4	6	0	T–5th	2	5	0	—	—
1986	1986	Jim Hershberger	NCAA	Division III	IIAC	9	1	0	2nd	7	1	0	Playoff berth	15
1987	1987	Jim Hershberger	NCAA	Division III	IIAC	5	5	0	3rd	5	3	0	—	—
1988	1988	Jim Hershberger	NCAA	Division III	IIAC	7	3	0	3rd	5	3	0	—	—
1989	1989	Jim Hershberger	NCAA	Division III	IIAC	5	5	0	T–6th	4	5	0	—	—
1990	1990	Kevin Twait	NCAA	Division III	IIAC	1	9	0	8th	1	7	0	—	—
1991	1991	Kevin Twait	NCAA	Division III	IIAC	1	9	0	T–8th	1	7	0	—	—
1992	1992	Kevin Twait	NCAA	Division III	IIAC	2	7	0	7th	2	6	0	—	—
1993	1993	Kevin Twait	NCAA	Division III	IIAC	3	6	0	T–5th	3	5	0	—	—
1994	1994	Kevin Twait	NCAA	Division III	IIAC	3	6	0	6th	3	5	0	—	—
1995	1995	Kevin Twait	NCAA	Division III	IIAC	2	7	0	T–6th	2	6	0	—	—
1996	1996	Joe Hadachek	NCAA	Division III	IIAC	5	5	0	5th	4	4	0	—	—
1997	1997	Joe Hadachek	NCAA	Division III	IIAC	3	7	0	T–6th	3	5	0	—	—
1998	1998	Joe Hadachek	NCAA	Division III	IIAC	7	3	0	T–3rd	7	3	0	—	—
1999	1999	Joe Hadachek	NCAA	Division III	IIAC	7	3	0	3rd	7	3	0	—	—
2000	2000	Steve Osterberger	NCAA	Division III	IIAC	7	3	0	3rd	7	3	0	—	—
2001	2001	Steve Osterberger	NCAA	Division III	IIAC	5	5	0	T–5th	4	5	0	—	—
2002	2002	Steve Osterberger	NCAA	Division III	IIAC	3	7	0	T–6th	3	6	0	—	—
2003	2003	Steve Osterberger	NCAA	Division III	IIAC	6	4	0	T–4th	4	4	0	—	—
2004	2004	Steve Osterberger	NCAA	Division III	IIAC	6	4	0	T–3rd	5	3	0	—	—
2005	2005	Steve Osterberger	NCAA	Division III	IIAC	5	5	0	5th	4	5	0	—	—
2006	2006	Jay Anderson	NCAA	Division III	IIAC	4	6	0	5th	4	4	0	—	—
2007	2007	Jay Anderson	NCAA	Division III	IIAC	5	5	0	T–6th	3	5	0	—	—
2008	2008	Jay Anderson	NCAA	Division III	IIAC	7	3	0	2nd	6	2	0	—	—
2009	2009	Jay Anderson	NCAA	Division III	IIAC	4	6	0	6th	3	5	0	—	—
2010	2010	Jay Anderson	NCAA	Division III	IIAC	3	7	0	T–7th	2	6	0	—	—
2011	2011	Jay Anderson	NCAA	Division III	IIAC	2	8	0	7th	2	6	0	—	—
2012	2012	Jay Anderson	NCAA	Division III	IIAC	5	4	0	T–2nd	4	3	0	—	—
2013	2013	Jay Anderson	NCAA	Division III	IIAC	4	6	0	T–3rd	4	3	0	—	—
2014	2014	Jay Anderson	NCAA	Division III	IIAC	5	5	0	T–3rd	4	3	0	—	—
2015	2015	Jay Anderson	NCAA	Division III	IIAC	1	9	0	8th	0	7	0	—	—
2016	2016	Jay Anderson	NCAA	Division III	IIAC	3	7	0	T–5th	3	5	0	—	—
2017	2017	Grant Mollring	NCAA	Division III	IIAC	3	7	0	T–7th	2	6	0	—	—
2018	2018	Grant Mollring	NCAA	Division III	A-R-C	1	9	0	9th	0	8	0	—	—
2019	2019	Grant Mollring	NCAA	Division III	A-R-C	3	7	0	T–7th	1	7	0	—	—
Season canceled due to COVID-19
2021	2021	Grant Mollring	NCAA	Division III	A-R-C	5	5	0	T–4th	4	4	0	—	—
2022	2022	Grant Mollring	NCAA	Division III	A-R-C	4	6	0	6th	3	5	0	—	—
2023	2023	Austin Dickinson	NCAA	Division III	A-R-C	2	8	0	T–6th	2	6	0	—	—
2024	2024	Austin Dickinson	NCAA	Division III	A-R-C	2	8	0	T–6th	2	6	0	—	—
2025	2025	Austin Dickinson	NCAA	Division III	A-R-C	3	7	0	7th	2	6	0	—	—
