= Buena Vista University =

Private university in Iowa, US

- Former name: Buena Vista College (1891–1995)
- Type: Private university
- Established: 1891; 135 years ago
- Religious affiliation: Presbyterian Church (USA)
- Endowment: $166.4 million (2025)
- President: Brian Lenzmeier
- Students: 1,973
- Undergraduates: 1,474
- Postgraduates: 499
- Location: Storm Lake, Iowa, United States; 42.642588°N 95.207875°W
- Campus: Rural, 60 acres (0.25 km^{2})
- Colors: Navy Blue and Gold
- Mascot: Beavers
- Website: bvu.edu/

Buena Vista University is a private university in Storm Lake, Iowa, United States. Founded in 1891 as Buena Vista College, it is affiliated with the Presbyterian Church. The university's 60-acre (240,000 m^{2}) campus is situated on the shores of Storm Lake, a 3,200-acre (13 km^{2}) natural lake.

Buena Vista University offers 42 undergraduate majors at its Storm Lake campus. Seventeen additional locations throughout Iowa and online serve working adult and graduate students.

== History ==
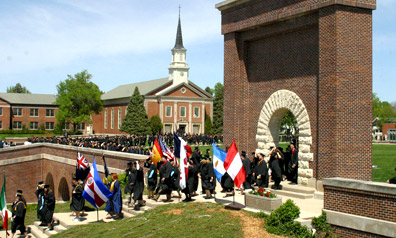
Graduates walking through the Victory Arch during Buena Vista University's commencement ceremony

At its inception, the college was housed in the Storm Lake Opera House, where it remained for only a year. Old Main, the college's first building, opened in 1892, and was occupied by faculty and students until it burned down in 1956. Major construction projects in the 1950s and 1960s extended the college, which soon included three dormitories, a library, and a number of classroom buildings. Johnny Holm's performances were considered a campus tradition.

== Academics ==
The various major study areas of Buena Vista University are grouped within four schools, each of which is administered by a dean.

- Harold Walter Siebens School of Business
- School of Education
- School of Liberal Arts
- School of Science

Buena Vista University also offers pre-professional programs. Specific course requirements vary with each particular professional and school area and are worked out in detail with the faculty advisor.

The William W. Siebens American Heritage Lecture Series addresses American freedoms. Speakers have included former U.S. Presidents George H.W. Bush and Jimmy Carter; former Prime Ministers Benazir Bhutto of Pakistan, Shimon Peres of Israel, F. W. de Klerk of South Africa, Margaret Thatcher and John Major of Britain; Madeleine Albright, Gen. Colin L. Powell, Walter Cronkite, Carl Sagan, Sir John Marks Templeton, Michael Gartner, Harry Blackmun, Bob Woodward, David Gergen, Jehan Sadat, Vicente Fox, and Paul Volcker.

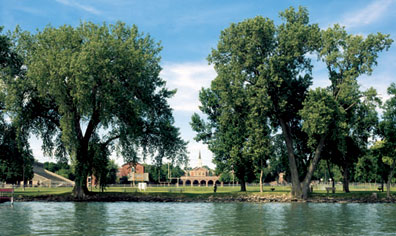
Buena Vista University's campus on the shores of Storm Lake

In 2009, the military science program began at BVU, the only such program in Western Iowa. The mission of the program is derived directly from the regulations governing the Army Reserve Officers Training Corps (AROTC) which are issued by the Army Cadet Command and Army Training and Doctrine Command. Army ROTC is an elective curriculum students take along with their major program of study. The program is designed to give students tools, training and experiences that will help them succeed in any competitive environment.

Buena Vista University's degree completion programs offer educational opportunities across the state of Iowa at its off-campus locations. These sites are on the campuses of community colleges with which BVU has established partnerships. Locations include sites in Carroll, Council Bluffs, Creston, Denison, Fort Dodge, Emmetsburg, Estherville, Spencer, Spirit Lake, LeMars, Marshalltown, Mason City, Newton, Ottumwa, and West Burlington.

== Athletics ==
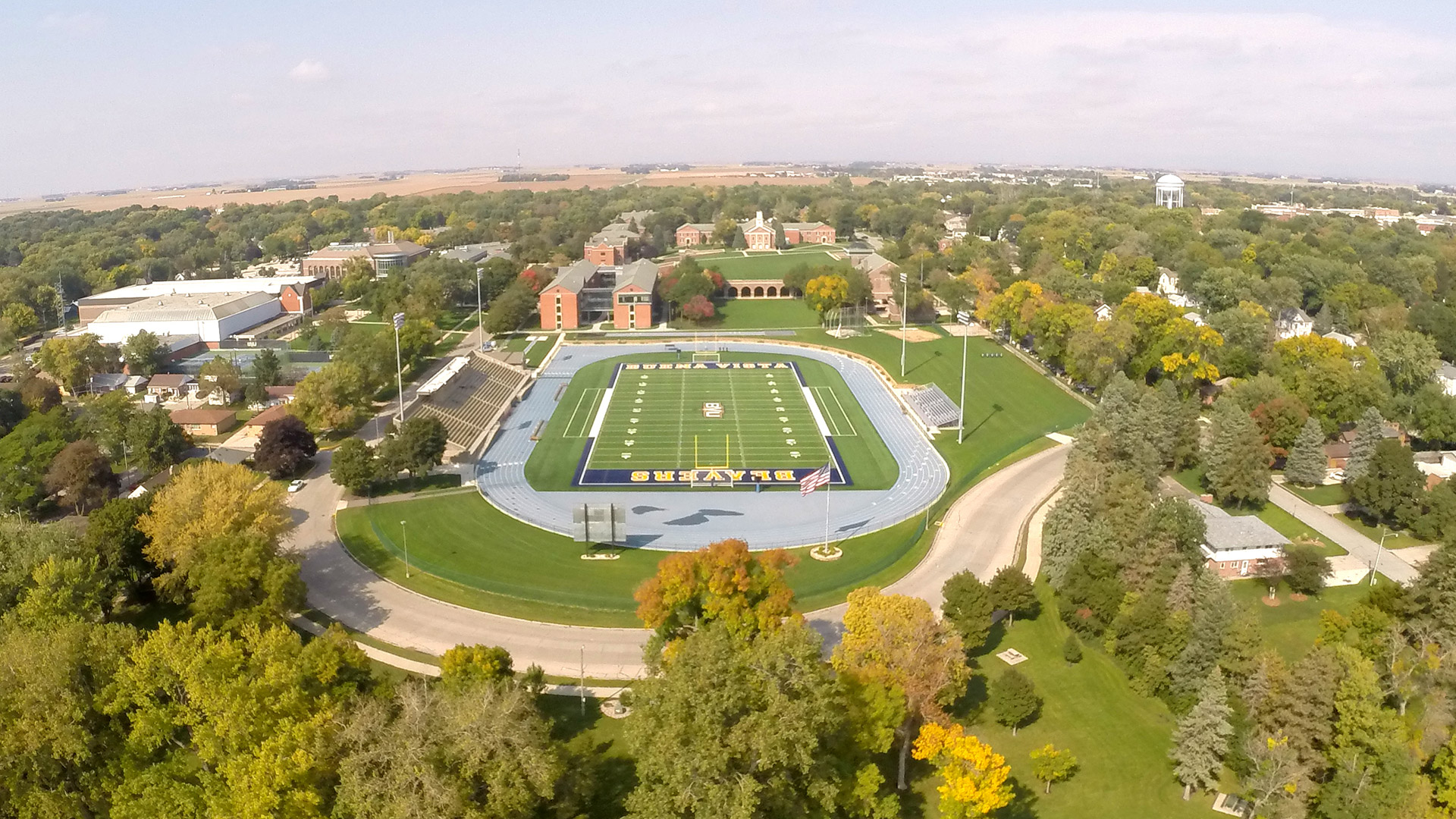
J. Leslie Rollins Stadium and Peterson Field

Buena Vista University competes in 21 intercollegiate sports at the varsity level. The university is an NCAA Division III institution and a member of the American Rivers Conference (formerly the Iowa Intercollegiate Athletic Conference). Teams that compete at BVU include baseball, men's and women's basketball, cross country, football, men's and women's golf, men's and women's soccer, men's and women's tennis, track & field, volleyball, and wrestling. Roughly one out of every four BVU students participate in intercollegiate athletics.

Buena Vista's mascot is the Beaver. The origins of the Beaver as the Buena Vista mascot go back to the early 1900s, when the football team was called the BVers. In the spring of 1921, a Buena Vista student combined that nickname with the name of the then-popular soft drink Bevo to create the nickname the Beavers.

Buena Vista's softball team appeared in one Women's College World Series in 1971, and won the NCAA Division III softball national championship in 1984, one year after being national runners-up in 1983.

== Notable alumni ==
- Bob Amsberry, college women's basketball coach
- Nate Bjorkgren, professional basketball coach
- Ken Carlson, member of the Iowa House of Representatives
- Jim Doran, professional football player
- Jim Fanning, professional baseball player and manager
- Ryan Grubb, college football coach
- Carlos Martinez, professional football player
- Nelle Peters, architect
- Randy Rahe, college football coach
- Priscillah Ruzibuka, Rwandan entrepreneur
- Jesse Schmidt, professional football player
- Shelly M. Shelton, Republican member of the Nevada Assembly
- Mark Thompson, politician
- Andre D. Wagner, photographer
- Lindsay Peoples Wagner, journalist
