= 1978 Baldwin–Wallace Yellow Jackets football team =

American college football season

1978 Baldwin–Wallace Yellow Jackets football

NCAA Division III champion OAC co-champion OAC Red Division champion

OAC championship game, T 17–17 vs. Wittenberg

Stagg Bowl, W 24–10 vs. Wittenberg
- Conference: Ohio Athletic Conference
- Red Division
- Record: 11–0–1 (5–0 OAC)
- Head coach: Lee Tressel (21st season)
- Offensive coordinator: Bob Packard (5th season)
- Home stadium: George Finnie Stadium

1978 Ohio Athletic Conference football standings
	Conf.					Overall
Team	W		L		T	W		L		T
Blue Division
Wittenberg xy+^	5	–	0	–	0	10	–	1	–	1
Capital	3	–	2	–	0	6	–	3	–	0
Wooster	3	–	2	–	0	6	–	3	–	0
Marietta	2	–	3	–	0	5	–	4	–	0
Muskingum	1	–	4	–	0	3	–	5	–	1
Otterbein	1	–	4	–	0	2	–	6	–	1
Red Division
Baldwin–Wallace xy+^	5	–	0	–	0	11	–	0	–	1
Ohio Northern	3	–	2	–	0	5	–	4	–	0
Denison	3	–	2	–	0	4	–	4	–	1
Mount Union	2	–	3	–	0	4	–	4	–	1
Ohio Wesleyan	2	–	3	–	0	3	–	5	–	1
Heidelberg	0	–	5	–	0	0	–	9	–	0
Not competing for championship
Kenyon			–			3	–	6	–	0
Oberlin			–			0	–	9	–	0
Championship: Baldwin–Wallace 17, Wittenberg 17
+ – Conference co-champions; x – Division champion/co-champions; y – Championship game participant; ^ – NCAA Division III playoff participant

The 1978 Baldwin–Wallace Yellow Jackets football team was an American football team that represented Baldwin–Wallace University as a member of the Ohio Athletic Conference (OAC) during the 1978 NCAA Division III football season. In their 21st season under head coach Lee Tressel, the Yellow Jackets compiled an 11–0–1 record, the tie (17–17) coming in the OAC championship game at B-W's George Finnie Stadium against Wittenberg.

The Yellow Jackets participated in the NCAA Division III playoffs where they defeated St. Lawrence (71–7) in the quarterfinals and Carnegie Mellon (31–10) in the semifinals. The Division III championship was decided in the 1978 Amos Alonzo Stagg Bowl featuring a rematch of OAC co-champions Baldwin-Wallace and Wittenberg. After playing to a tie in the conference championship game, Baldwin-Wallace dominated in the Stagg Bowl, winning by a 24–10 score.

The team played its home games at George Finnie Stadium in Berea, Ohio.

== Schedule ==
Date	Opponent	Site	Result	Attendance	Source
September 16	at Ashland*	Ashland, OH	W 30–12	4,300–4,351	
September 23	Capital*	George Finnie Stadium; Berea, OH	W 31–6	4,851	
September 30	at Muskingum*	McConagha Stadium; New Concord, OH	W 17–6	3,000	
October 7	Denison	George Finnie Stadium; Berea, OH	W 49–0	3,184	
October 14	Mount Union	George Finnie Stadium; Berea, OH	W 32–13	4,584	
October 21	at Ohio Wesleyan	Delaware, OH	W 48–14	4,300	
October 28	at Ohio Northern	Ada, OH	W 7–3	5,321	
November 4	Heidelberg	George Finnie Stadium; Berea, OH	W 63–6	3,841	
November 11	Wittenberg*	George Finnie Stadium; Berea, OH (OAC championship game)	T 17–17	7,351	
November 18	St. Lawrence*	George Finnie Stadium; Berea, OH (NCAA Division III quarterfinal)	W 71–7	4,184	
November 25	Carnegie Mellon*	George Finnie Stadium; Berea, OH (NCAA Division III semifinal)	W 31–10	4,285	
December 2	vs. Wittenberg*	Phenix Municipal Stadium; Phenix City, AL (Stagg Bowl—NCAA Division III championship game)	W 24–10	6,100	
*Non-conference game

== Awards and honors ==
In voting by the OAC coaches, Baldwin Wallace tackle Paul Petrella won the Hank Critchfield Award as the best defensive lineman in the conference. Fullback Roger "Amtrak" Andrachik (a Yale transfer) tied with Wittenberg's Dave Merritt in the balloting for the Mike Gregory Award as the OAC's best offensive back.

Nine Baldwin-Wallace players received first-team honors on the All-OAC team: quarterback Joe Surniak; fullback Roger Andrachik; offensive tackle Jeff Jenkins; punter Doug Schiefer; linebacker Bill Rickert; defensive down linemen Bill Davis and Paul Petrella; linebacker Gary Monda; and defensive back Gary Stelter.

After the season, coach Tressel was honored by the American Football Coaches Association (AFCA) as the college division coach of the year. Tressel was inducted into the College Football Hall of Fame in 1996.

In October 2018, the 1978 team was inducted as a group into the Baldwin Wallace Athletics Hall of Fame.
