= Bob Packard =

Bob Packard may refer to:

- Bob Packard (sprinter)
- Bob Packard (American football)
