= Baldwin Wallace Yellow Jackets football =

Baldwin Wallace Yellow Jackets
- First season: 1893
- Head coach: Jim Hilvert; 9th season, 57–25 (.695)
- Location: Berea, Ohio
- Stadium: George Finnie Stadium (capacity: 7,800)
- Field: Tressel Field
- NCAA division: Division III
- Conference: OAC
- Colors: Brown and gold

NCAA Division III championships
- 1978
- Website: BW Yellow Jackets

The Baldwin Wallace Yellow Jackets football team represents Baldwin Wallace University, located in Berea, Ohio, in NCAA Division III college football competition.

The Yellow Jackets, who began playing football in 1893, are members of the Ohio Athletic Conference.

Baldwin Wallace have won more games than any other team in the OAC.

The team was coached by Lee Tressel for 23 seasons between 1958 and 1980, a period that included a national championship and undefeated record in 1978.

== History ==
=== Conferences ===
- 1893–1914, 1949–1960: Independent
- 1915–1919, 1924–1948, 1961–present: Ohio Athletic Conference

== Championships ==
=== National championships ===
Year	Association	Division	Head coach	Record	Opponent	Result
1978	NCAA (1)	Division III (1)	Lee Tressel	11–0–1 (5–0 OAC)	Wittenberg	W, 24–10

== Postseason appearances ==
=== NCAA Division III playoffs ===
The Yellow Jackets have made seven appearances in the NCAA Division III playoffs, with a combined record of 4–5.

Year	Round	Opponent	Result
1978	Quarterfinals; Semifinals; Stagg Bowl	St. Lawrence; Carnegie Mellon; Wittenberg	W, 71–7; W, 31–6; W, 24–10
1979	Quarterfinals	Widener	L, 8–29
1980	Quarterfinals	Dayton	L, 0–34
1982	Quarterfinals	Augustana (IL)	L, 22–28
1991	First Round	Dayton	L, 10–27
2003	First Round; Second Round	Hanover; Wheaton (IL)	W, 54–32; L, 12–16
2026	Second Round	TBD	11/28/2026
