= Lee Tressel =

American football player and coach (1925–1981)

Biographical details
- Born: February 12, 1925; Ada, Ohio, U.S.
- Died: April 16, 1981 (aged 56); Berea, Ohio, U.S.

Playing career
- 1943–1944: Baldwin–Wallace
- 1946–1947: Baldwin–Wallace
- Position: Fullback

Coaching career (HC unless noted)
- 1950–1955: Mentor HS (OH)
- 1956–1957: Massillon Washington HS (OH)
- 1958–1980: Baldwin–Wallace

Head coaching record
- Overall: 155–52–6 (college); 70–20 (high school)
- Tournaments: 3–2 (D-III playoffs)

Accomplishments and honors

Championships
- 1 NCAA Division III (1978); 4 OAC (1968, 1977–1978, 1980)

Awards
- AFCA College Division Coach of the Year (1978); 5× OAC Coach of the Year (1968, 1974, 1977–1978, 1980)
- College Football Hall of Fame; Inducted in 1996 (profile)

Lee Tressel (February 12, 1925 – April 16, 1981) was a football coach and athletic director at Baldwin–Wallace College in Berea, Ohio. Tressel accumulated the most winning record as the head football coach at Baldwin–Wallace. His 1978 team won the NCAA Division III Football Championship, achieved National Coach of that year, and in 1996 was inducted into the College Football Hall of Fame.

== Career ==
Tressel served as football coach and athletic director at Baldwin–Wallace College in Berea, Ohio. Tressel accumulated a 155–52–6 record in 23 seasons (1958–1980) as the head football coach at Baldwin–Wallace. His 1978 team won the NCAA Division III Football Championship and for his efforts, Tressel was named National Coach of the Year that championship season.

Before coaching at Baldwin–Wallace, Tressel was a successful high school head coach in Ohio, with stops at Ada High School, Massillon Washington High School, and Mentor High School. At Mentor, Tressel put together a 34-game winning streak, while compiling a 16–3 mark in two seasons at Massillon.

Tressel was married to Eloise Tressel, who worked as the athletic historian at Baldwin–Wallace. Tressel is the father of Jim Tressel, who was the head football coach at Ohio State University from 2001 through the 2010 season. Another son, Dick, was the head football coach at Hamline University in Saint Paul, Minnesota for 23 seasons (1978–2000) and was later an assistant at Ohio State. Tressel was 56 at the time of his death from lung cancer.

== Legacy ==
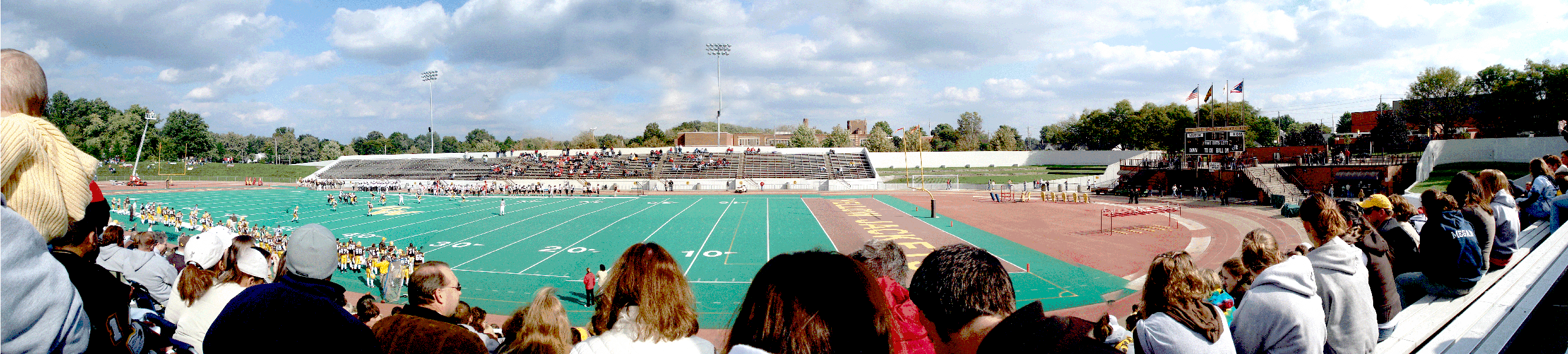
Panorama view of The George Finnie Stadium & Tressel Field

After Tressel's death in 1981 he was posthumously inducted into the College Football Hall of Fame. On the south side of the Baldwin–Wallace campus in Berea, there is a "Tressel Street" named in his honor. At the corners where Tressel Street starts and ends, at Bagley Road and E. Center Street, lay decorative street signs in honor of Lee and Eloise Tressel for their contributions to the Baldwin-Wallace campus. In 2012, the Football Field at George Finnie Stadium was dedicated to the Tressel Family.

== Head coaching record ==
=== College ===
| Year | Team | Overall | Conference | Standing | Bowl/playoffs | AP^{#} | UPI^{°} |
|---|---|---|---|---|---|---|---|
Baldwin–Wallace Yellow Jackets (Independent) (1958–1961)
| 1958 | Baldwin–Wallace | 4–4–1 | | | | | |
| 1959 | Baldwin–Wallace | 4–4 | | | | | |
| 1960 | Baldwin–Wallace | 4–3–1 | | | | | |
| 1961 | Baldwin–Wallace | 9–0 | | | | 2 | 2 |
Baldwin–Wallace Yellow Jackets (Ohio Athletic Conference) (1962–1980)
| 1962 | Baldwin–Wallace | 6–2 | 3–1 | 5th | | | |
| 1963 | Baldwin–Wallace | 6–3 | 3–2 | 7th | | | |
| 1964 | Baldwin–Wallace | 5–4 | 3–2 | 6th | | | |
| 1965 | Baldwin–Wallace | 4–3–1 | 2–3 | 10th | | | |
| 1966 | Baldwin–Wallace | 3–5 | 2–3 | T–8th | | | |
| 1967 | Baldwin–Wallace | 5–3–1 | 1–2 | 9th | | | |
| 1968 | Baldwin–Wallace | 8–1 | 4–0 | 1st | | | |
| 1969 | Baldwin–Wallace | 7–1–1 | 4–1–1 | 3rd | | | |
| 1970 | Baldwin–Wallace | 6–3 | 2–3 | 8th | | | |
| 1971 | Baldwin–Wallace | 9–1 | 4–1 | 2nd | | | |
| 1972 | Baldwin–Wallace | 7–2 | 3–2 | T–2nd (Red) | | | |
| 1973 | Baldwin–Wallace | 6–3 | 4–1 | 2nd (Red) | | | |
| 1974 | Baldwin–Wallace | 8–2 | 5–0 | 1st (Red) | | | |
| 1975 | Baldwin–Wallace | 7–2 | 4–1 | T–1st (Red) | | | |
| 1976 | Baldwin–Wallace | 7–2 | 5–0 | 1st (Blue) | | | |
| 1977 | Baldwin–Wallace | 9–1 | 5–0 | 1st (Blue) | | | |
| 1978 | Baldwin–Wallace | 11–0–1 | 5–0 | 1st (Red) | W NCAA Division III Championship | | |
| 1979 | Baldwin–Wallace | 8–2 | 4–1 | T–1st (Red) | L NCAA Division III Quarterfinal | | |
| 1980 | Baldwin–Wallace | 10–1 | 5–0 | T–1st (Red) | L NCAA Division III Quarterfinal | | |
| Baldwin–Wallace: | | 155–52–6 | | | | | |
| Total: | | 155–52–6 | | | | | |
National championship Conference title Conference division title or championship game berth
