= Baldwin Wallace Yellow Jackets =

Athletic teams representing Baldwin Wallace University

- University: Baldwin Wallace University
- Nickname: Yellow Jackets
- NCAA: Division III
- Conference: OAC (primary); MCVL (men's volleyball)
- Athletic director: Steve Thompson
- Location: Berea, Ohio
- Varsity teams: 26 (13 men's, 13 women's)
- Football stadium: George Finnie Stadium
- Basketball arena: Rudolph Ursprung Gymnasium
- Baseball stadium: Fisher Field
- Softball stadium: BW Softball Field
- Soccer stadium: George Finnie Stadium
- Aquatics center: BW Natatorium
- Lacrosse stadium: George Finnie Stadium
- Tennis venue: Pop Collins Courts
- Outdoor track and field venue: Harrison Dillard Indoor Track
- Volleyball arena: Rudolph Ursprung Gymnasium
- Colors: Brown and Gold
- Mascot: Stinger
- Website: bwyellowjackets.com
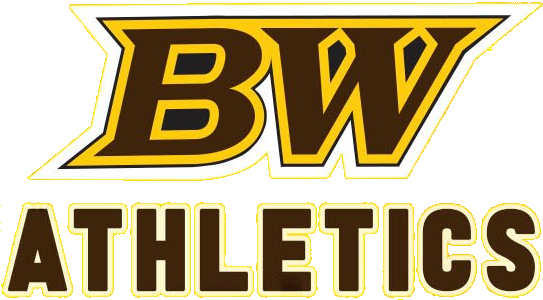

The Baldwin Wallace Yellow Jackets are the athletic teams for Baldwin Wallace University. The Yellow Jackets participate in Division III of the NCAA in the Ohio Athletic Conference. BW's rivalries include John Carroll University and University of Mount Union. BW's most successful athletic programs include cross country and swimming and diving. BW's athletic alumni include Harrison Dillard, Lee Tressel, and Jim Tressel.

== History ==
The university has long rivalries with John Carroll University and University of Mount Union. A notable BW athlete from the 20th century was Harrison Dillard, who won Olympic titles in both sprinting and hurdling events, in the 1948 Summer Olympics. The teams' colors are officially brown and gold. During the 1990s and early 2000s, the school used burgundy and teal as well as maroon and gold for its marketing literature. Since the mid-2000s, BW returned to its roots with using brown and gold. In 2009 after almost 20 years of use, BW adopted a new logo and modified the university's mascot for the athletic teams. The teams of the Sidney High School were named Yellow Jackets after Baldwin Wallace graduate Granville Robinson became Head Coach at Sidney High School.

== Varsity sports ==
The Baldwin Wallace Yellow Jackets varsity sports participate in Division III of the NCAA in the Ohio Athletic Conference. BW has 13 men's varsity teams and 13 women's varsity teams. Men's and women's lacrosse were added for the 2012–13 season. The school added men's volleyball for the 2021 season (2020–21 school year). Since the OAC sponsors volleyball only for women, the new team competes in the single-sport Midwest Collegiate Volleyball League.

Men's sports	Women's sports
Baseball	Basketball
Basketball	Bowling
Bowling	Cross country
Cross country	Golf
Football	Lacrosse
Golf	Soccer
Lacrosse	Softball
Soccer	Stunt
Swimming and diving (Note: The NCAA considers swimming and diving to be a single sport.)	Swimming and diving
Tennis	Tennis
Track and Field (Note: The NCAA considers indoor and outdoor track & field to be two separate sports. Its indoor track national championships are held in its winter season, with outdoor championships in its spring season.)	Track and field
Volleyball	Volleyball
Wrestling	Wrestling

=== Football ===
BW holds the title for Most Wins in the OAC. In the 106-year history of football at the university, the Yellow Jackets have compiled an all-time record of 546–319–30. The 546 wins are the most of any current OAC member school. Baldwin Wallace's football team was coached by Lee Tressel, who led the team to an undefeated record in 1978, and subsequently the NCAA Division III Championship.

=== Basketball ===
The women's Basketball team hold the records of 19 berths to the NCAA Division III National Tournament, Four "Elite Eight" finishes (1999–2000, 2000–2001 and 2005–2006, 2024–2025), Four "Sweet Sixteen finishes (2013-2014, 2019-2020, 2021-2022, 2023-2024), Thirteen OAC regular season titles and Nine OAC Tournament crowns.

The men's Basketball team hold the record of Five OAC Regular Season Championships, Five OAC Tournament Titles, Seven trips to the NCAA Tournament and Seven All-Americans.

=== Cross country ===
The Women's Cross Country record has 16 OAC cross country titles for the years of 1986, 1987, 1988, 1989, 1992, 1993, 1994, 1995, 1996, 1997, 1999, 2000, 2001, 2007 and 2009. The Men's Cross Country record has 5 OAC cross country titles for the years of 1973, 1979, 1981, 1982 and 1983.

=== Track and field ===
BW's Women's team won the 2016 Indoor Track and Field National Championship and were Runner's Up at the Outdoor National Championship. BW also holds the record for 2008 OAC Indoor Champions. The women's indoor and outdoor track & field teams have won 17 Ohio Athletic Conference indoor titles, including 15 straight from 1988 through 2002, and 16 OAC outdoor crowns, including a pair of OAC-record streaks of seven straight years. Add that success to 16 OAC cross country titles.

=== Wrestling ===
BW Wrestling has the record of Two NCAA National Champions, Two NCAA Runners-Up, 10 Division III All-Americans and 18 OAC champions.

== National championships ==
=== Team ===
Sport	Association	Division	Year	Opponent/Runner-up	Score
Football (1)	NCAA	Division III	1978	Wittenberg	24–10
Women's indoor track and field (1)	NCAA	Division III	2016	Illinois Wesleyan	42.5–36

== Club sports ==
BW club sports include Running Club, Men's Club Volleyball, Racquetball, Paintball and Archery. In 2012 BW moved its club Lacrosse to an official sport, and men's volleyball became a varsity sport in the 2020–21 school year.

=== Racquetball ===
Baldwin Wallace has a history in racquetball, including two USAR men's team intercollegiate titles in 2001 & 2002 and an overall Division II team title in 2006. Shane Vanderson won the USAR Intercollegiate racquetball men's championship in 2001, and three Baldwin Wallace players have won the women's title. Sheryl Lotts won it in 2009, Kristen Walsh in 2001 and Krystal Csuk won in 2002. Baldwin-Wallace players won the doubles title four times. Vanderson and Andy Hawthorne won the men's doubles title in 2002 and 2003, and Elle Summers won the women's title with Walsh in 2001 and with Csuk in 2002.

Of those champions, Vanderson and Hawthorne have gone on to be top 10 players on the International Racquetball Tour while Walsh and Csuk have been top 10 players on the Women's Professional Racquetball Organization tour. All four of these players have also represented the USA internationally.

== Facilities ==
Baldwin Wallace University participates in NCAA Division III athletics. Facilities include The Lou Higgins Center, The George Finnie Stadium, Heritage Field and the "Pop" Collins Tennis Complex.

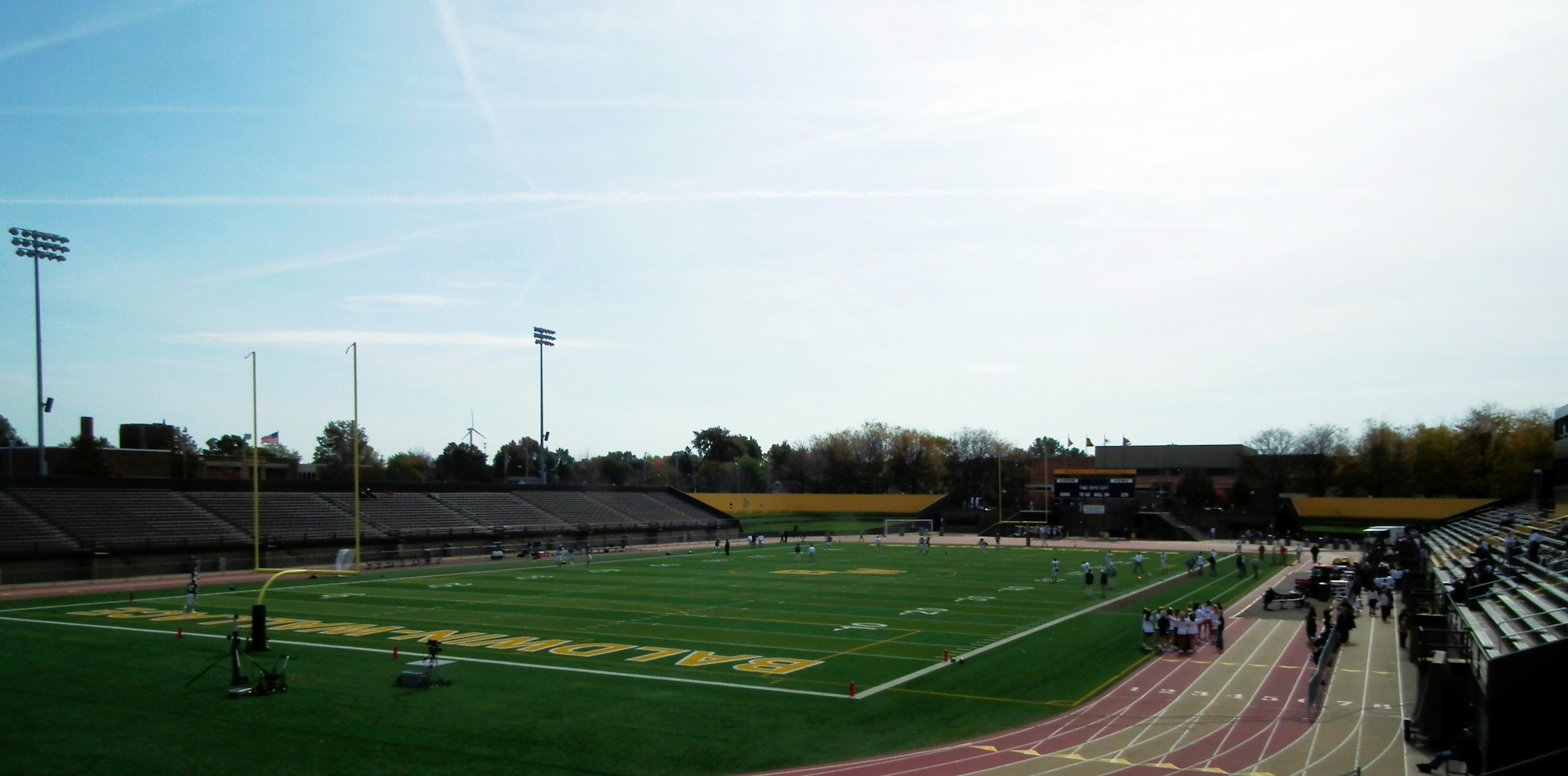
George Finnie Stadium

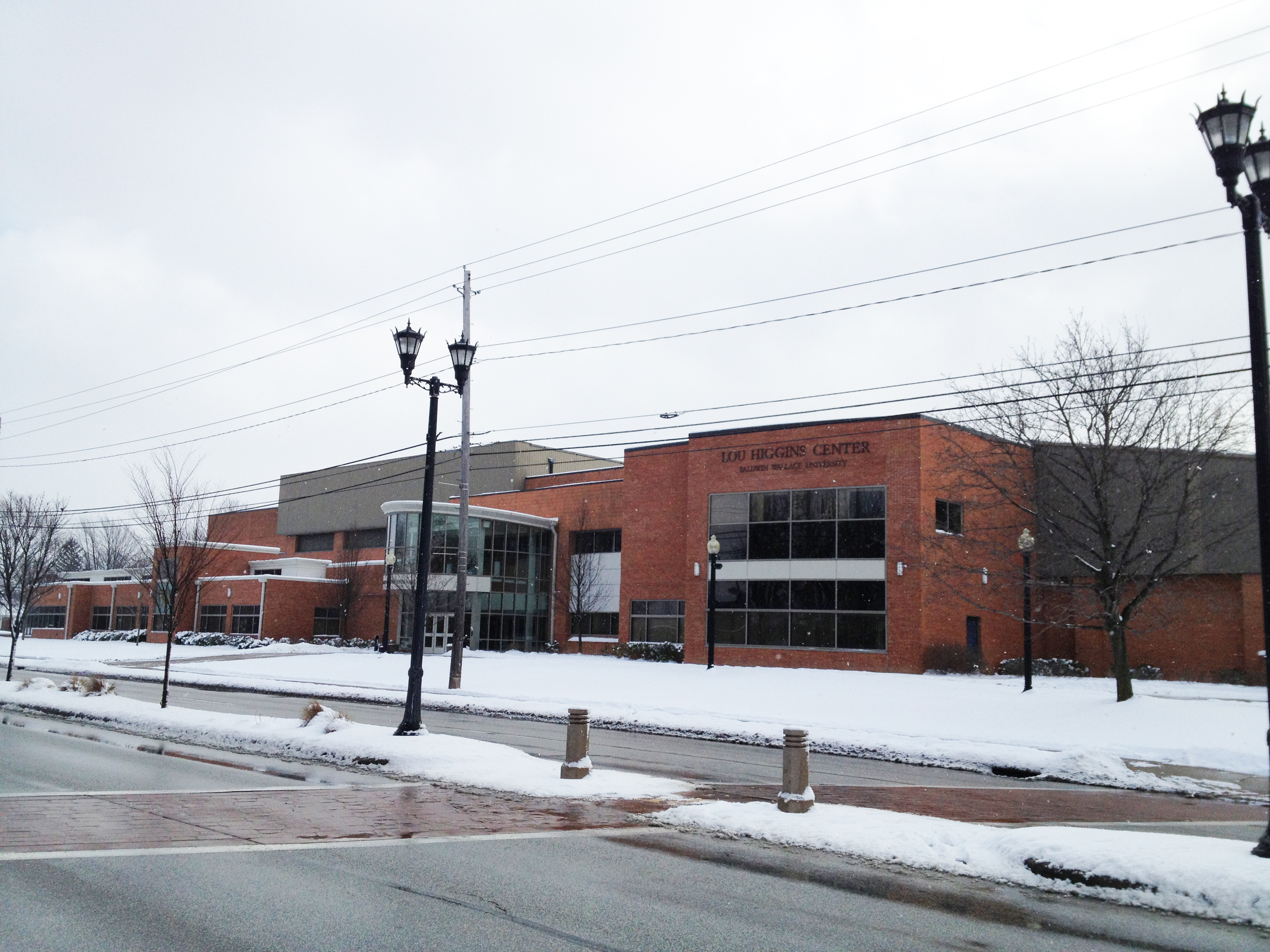
Lou Higgins Center

Venue	Sport(s)	Ref.
George Finnie Stadium	Football; Soccer; Lacrosse; Track and field	
Fisher Field	Baseball	
BW Softball Field	Softball	
Pop Collins Courts	Tennis	
BW Natatorium	Swimming	
Ursprung Gymnasium	Basketball; Volleyball; Wrestling; Stunt	
Harrison Dillard Indoor Track	Track and field (indoor)	
Lou Higgins Center	(various) (Note: For recreation purposes.)	

== Mascot ==
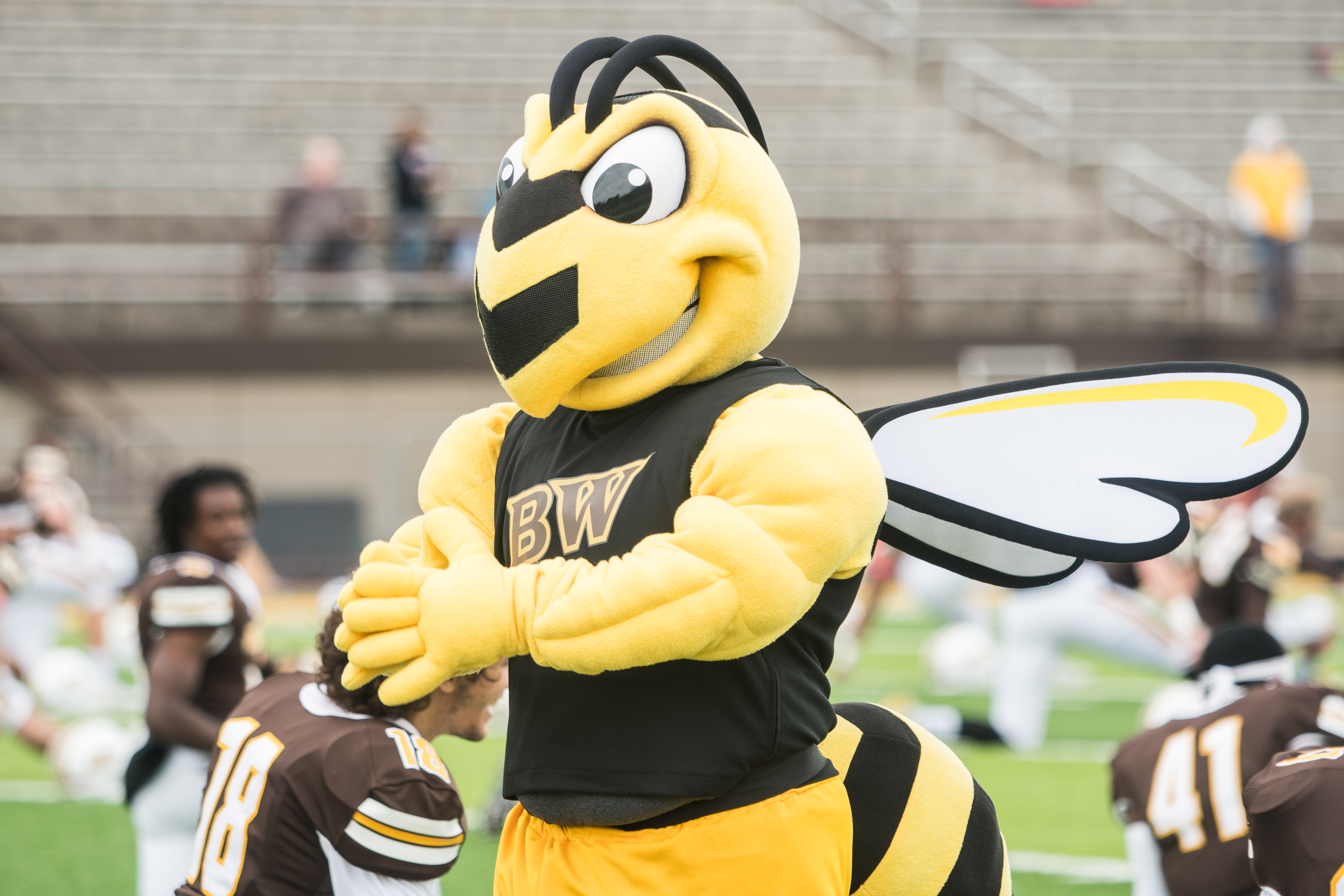
BW's mascot "Stinger"

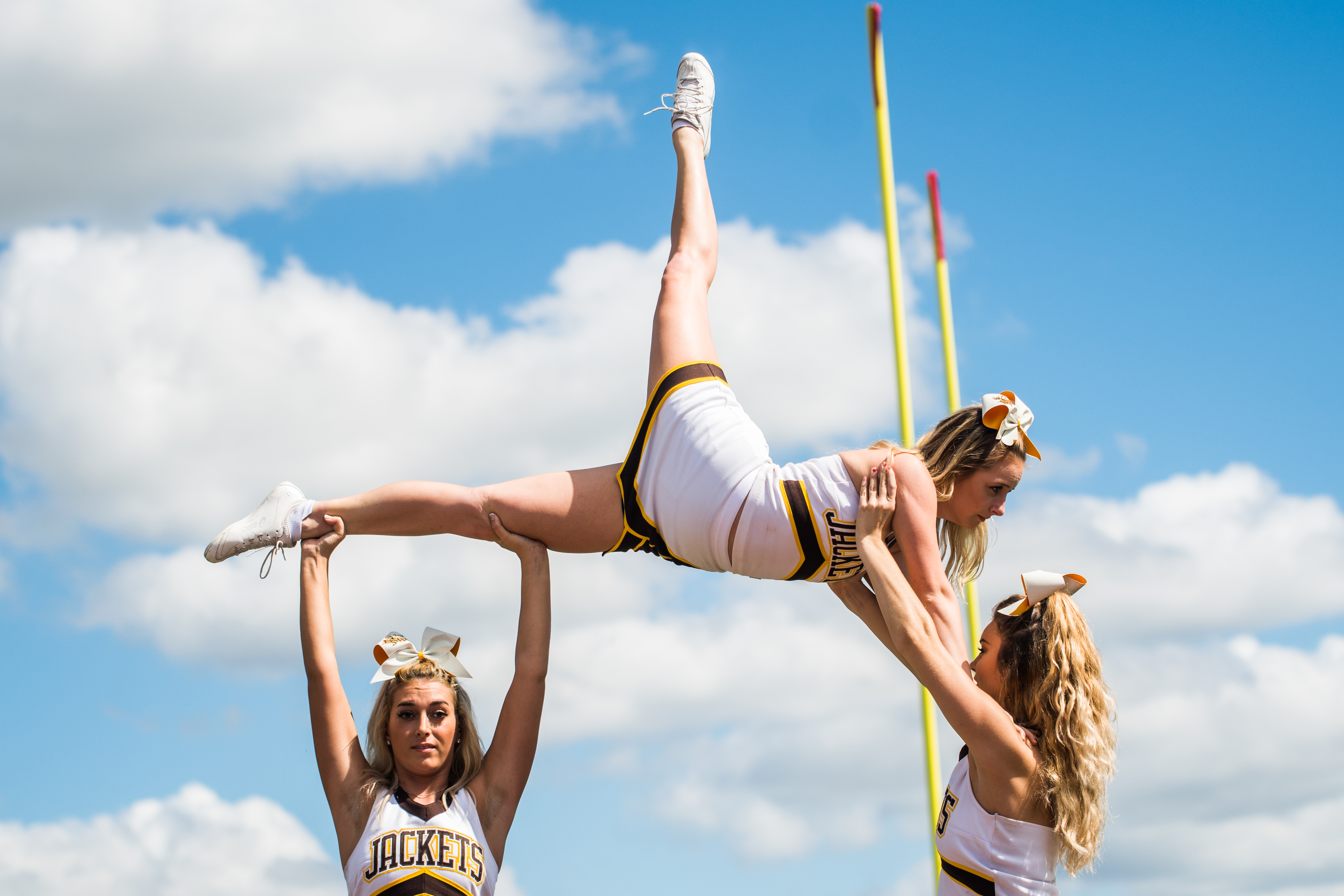
Cheerleaders performing at Homecoming, 2018

The official mascot of Baldwin Wallace University is Stinger. Stinger is depicted as a Yellow Jacket, specifically after the Eastern yellowjacket found throughout North America. Stinger is seen at many athletic events and university functions. In 2009, after almost 20 years of use, BW adopted a new logo and modified the mascot for the university's athletic teams.

== Fight song ==
BW Fight Song Fight, Baldwin Wallace
Fight, Baldwin Wallace
Fight and win this game;

We're cheering for you,
There's glory for you,
We're on the road to fame;

And in the battle,
We'll prove our mettle,
We're loyal, square, and brave.

Vict'ry will crown our might,
And in the breeze tonight
Our Brown and Gold shall wave!

Awww... JACKETS!

Written by Katherin Olderman in 1928

== People ==
=== Notable athletes ===
Baldwin Wallace University has over 41,000 alumni living throughout the United States. BW has many alumni that still reside throughout Ohio. Sports Alumni include former OSU Football coach Jim Tressel and his father Lee Tressel, former NFL player and first Atlanta Falcons head coach Norb Hecker, CBS announcer Bud Collins, and Olympian Harrison Dillard. Lance Yandell who was a star Wide receiver setting records for Baldwin Wallace football.

== Gallery ==
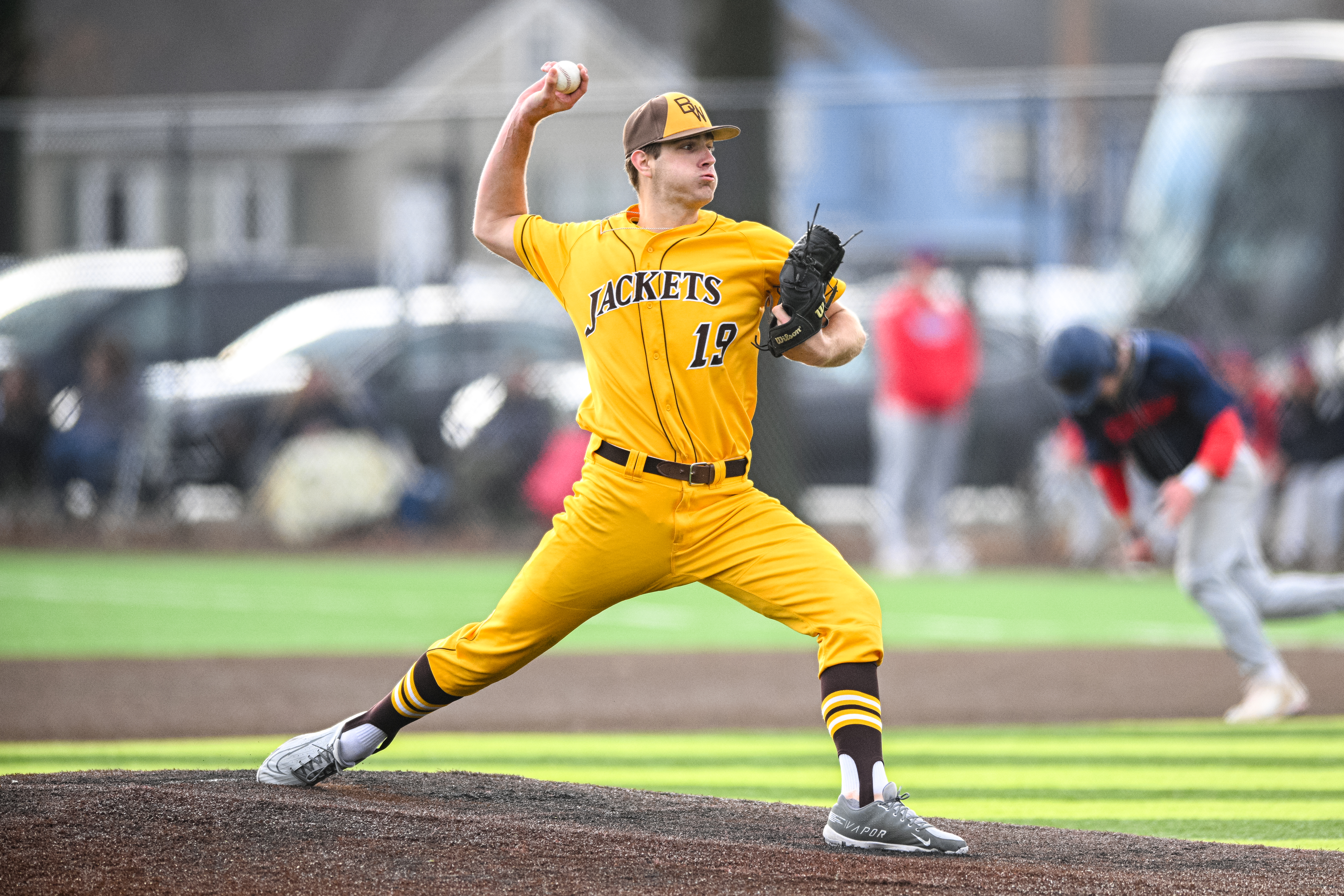
A Yellow Jackets baseball game in 2022

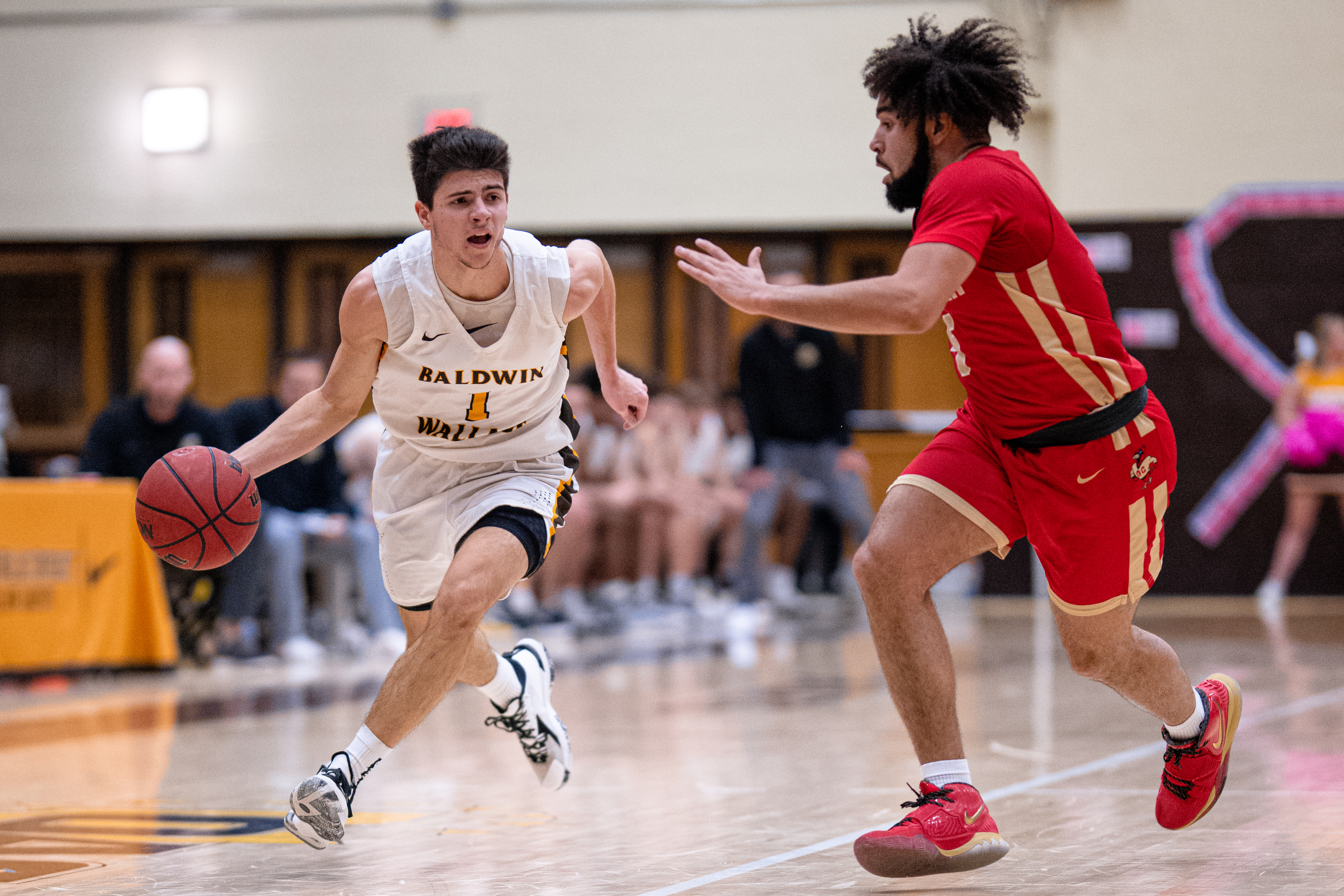
A Yellow Jackets men's basketball game in 2022

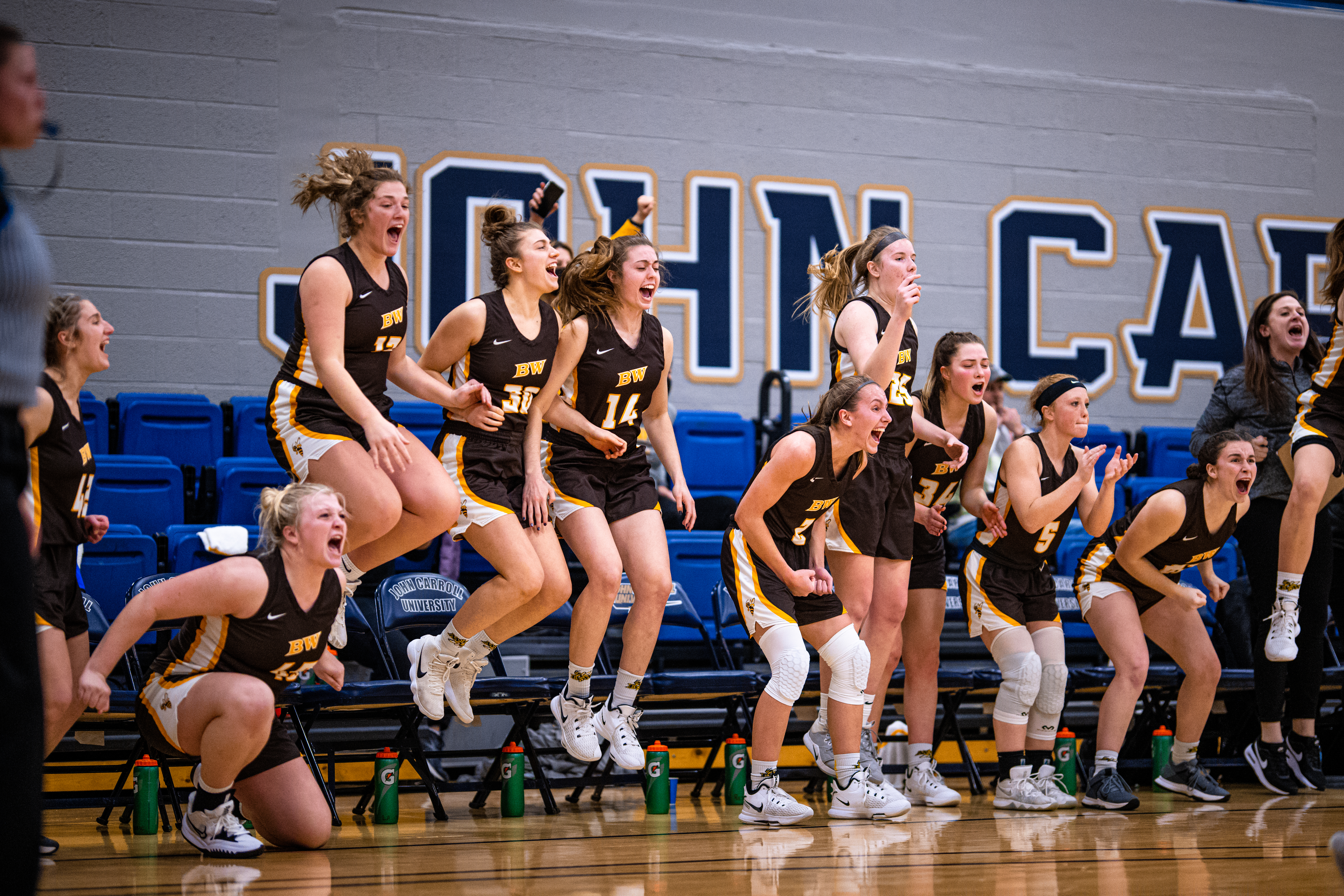
A Yellow Jackets women's basketball game in 2022

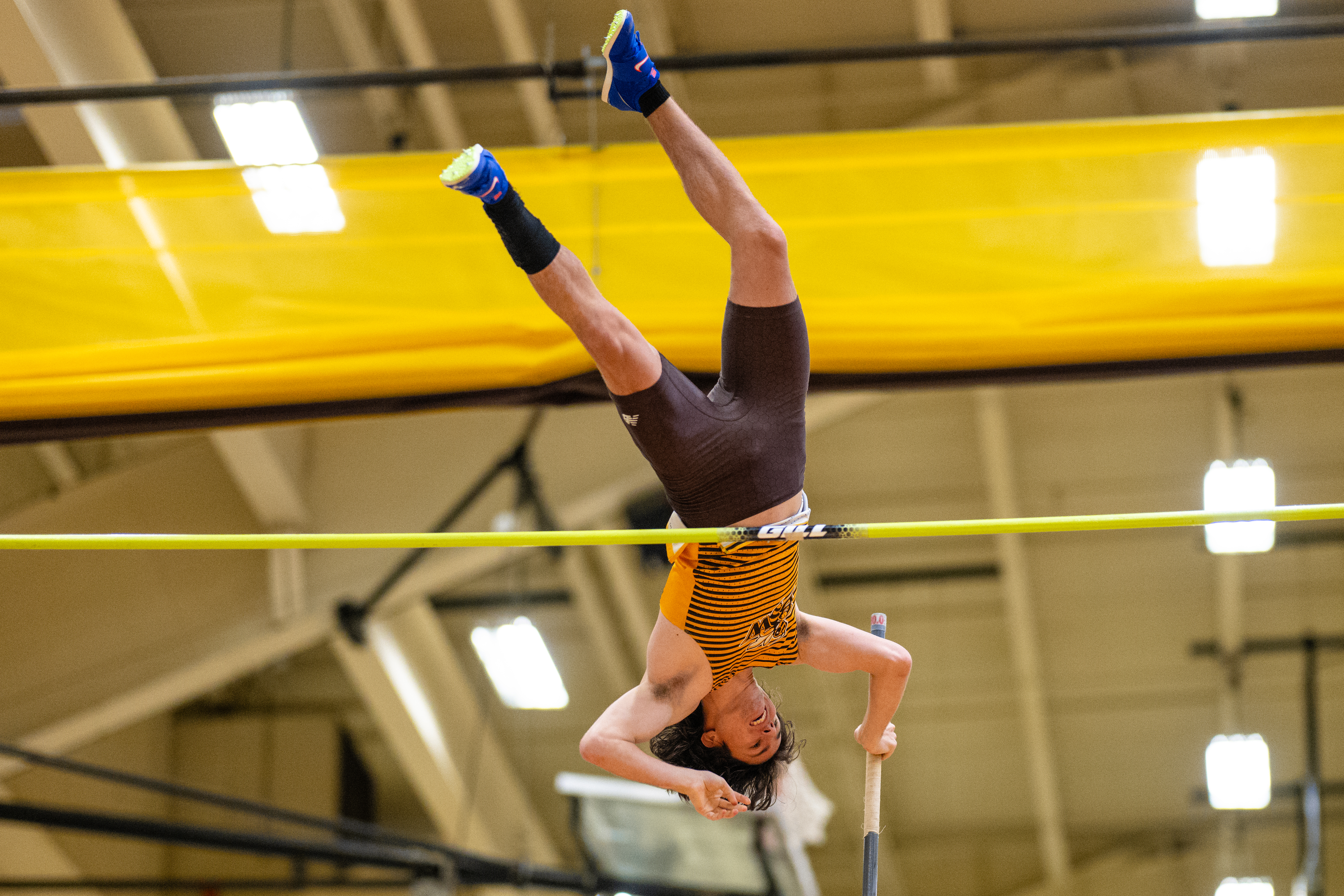
A Yellow Jackets men's indoor track and field meet in 2025

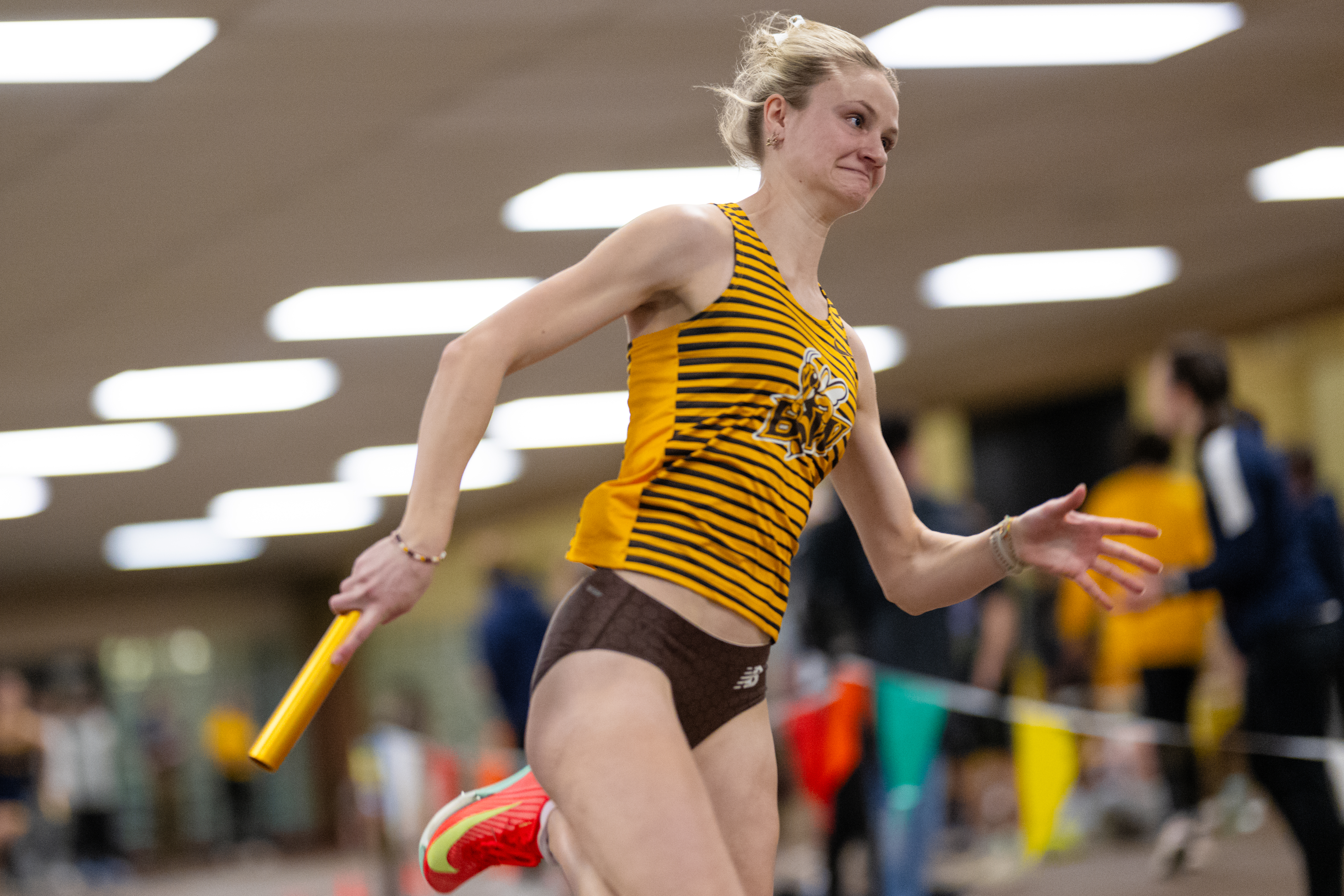
A Yellow Jackets women's indoor track and field meet in 2025

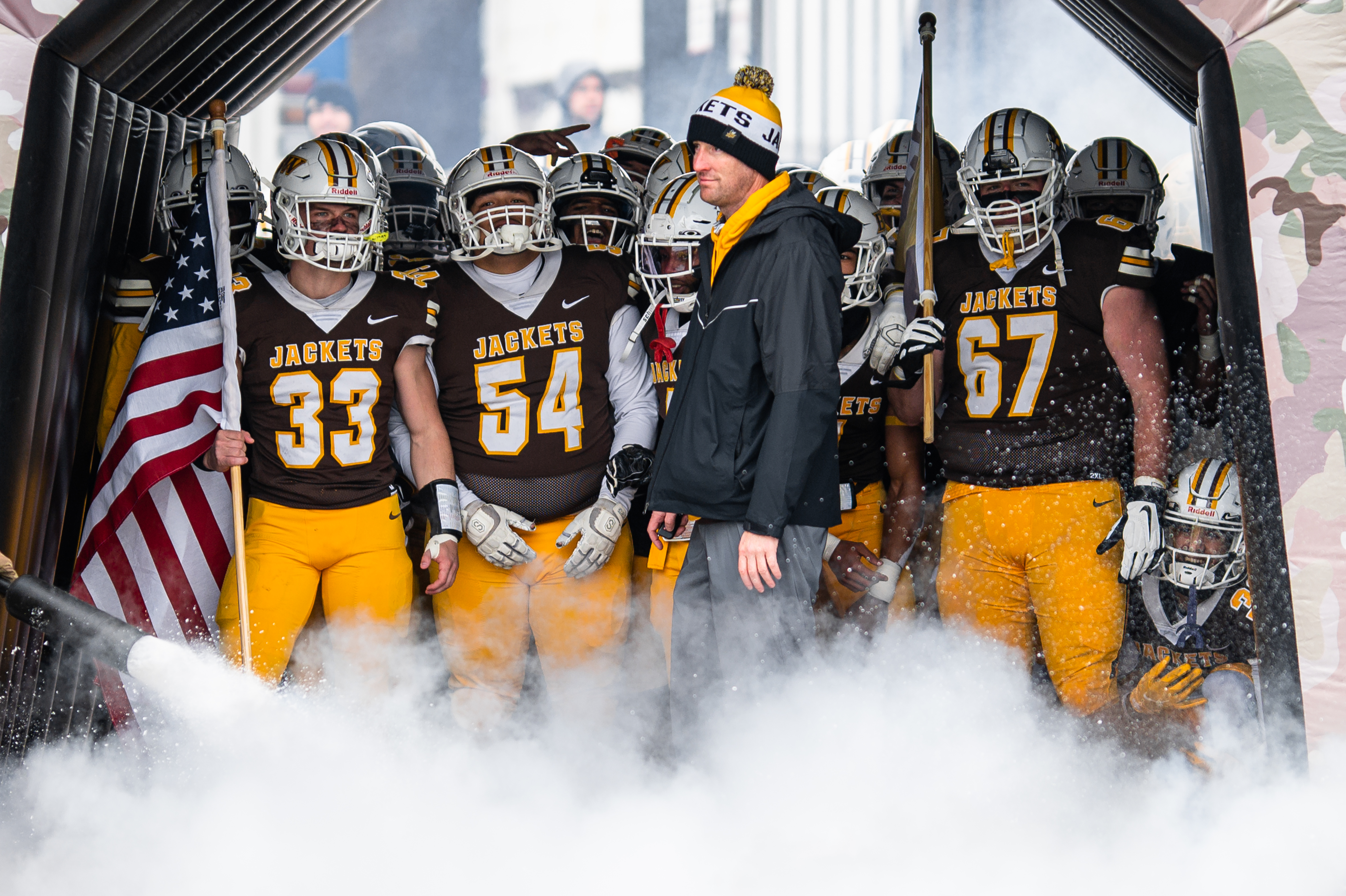
A Yellow Jackets football game in 2021

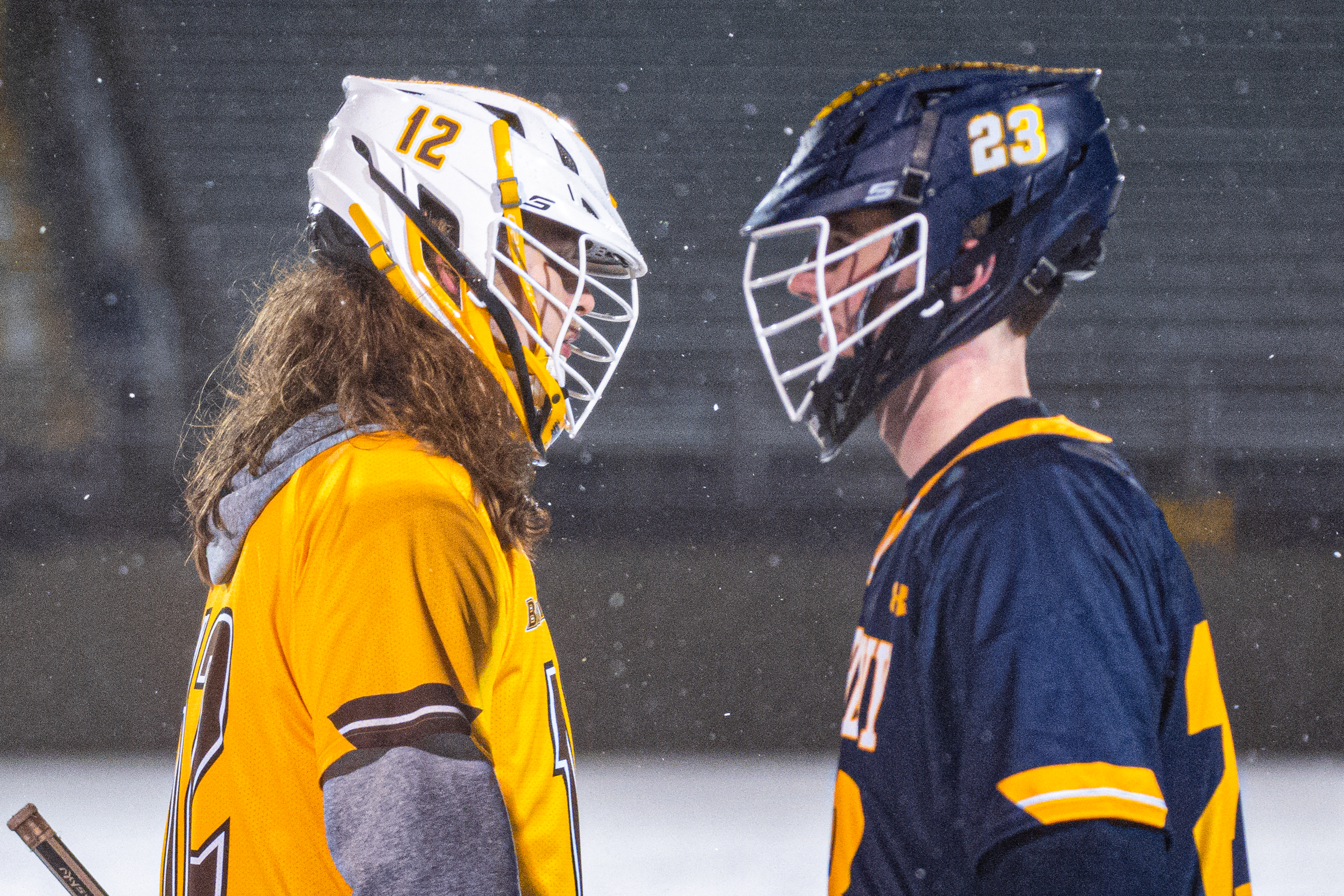
A Yellow Jackets men's lacrosse game in 2020

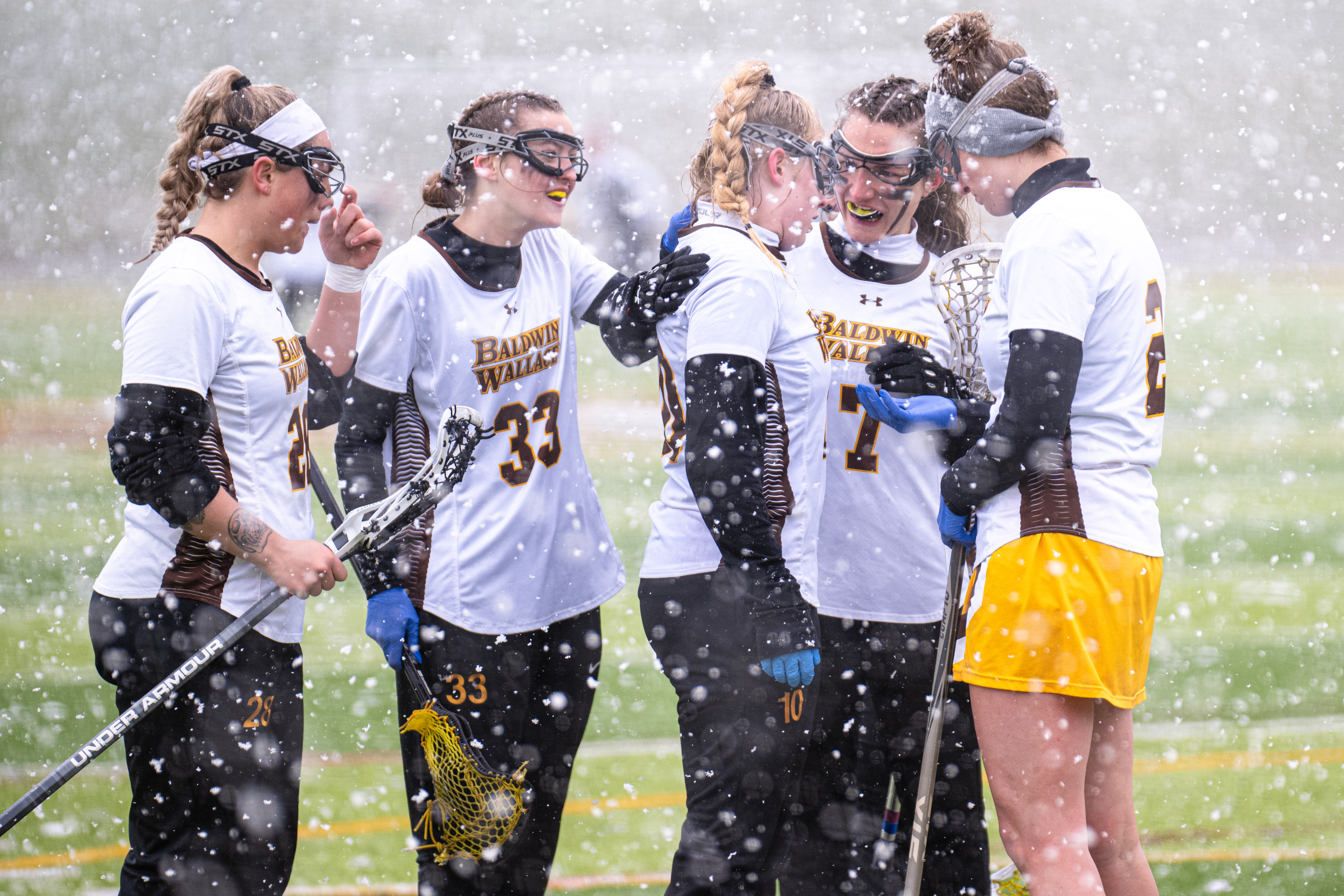
A Yellow Jackets women's lacrosse game in 2022

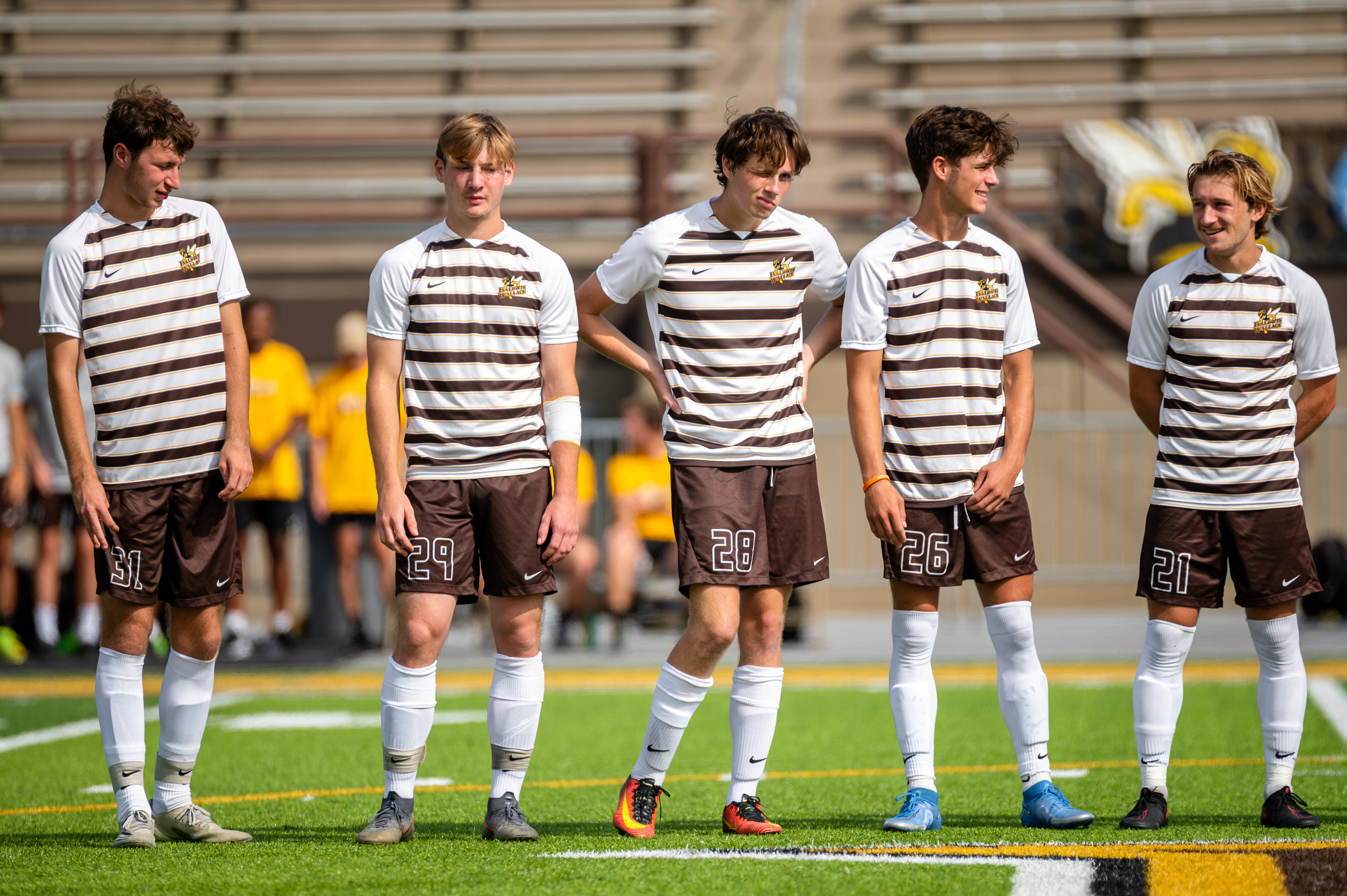
A Yellow Jackets men's soccer game in 2021

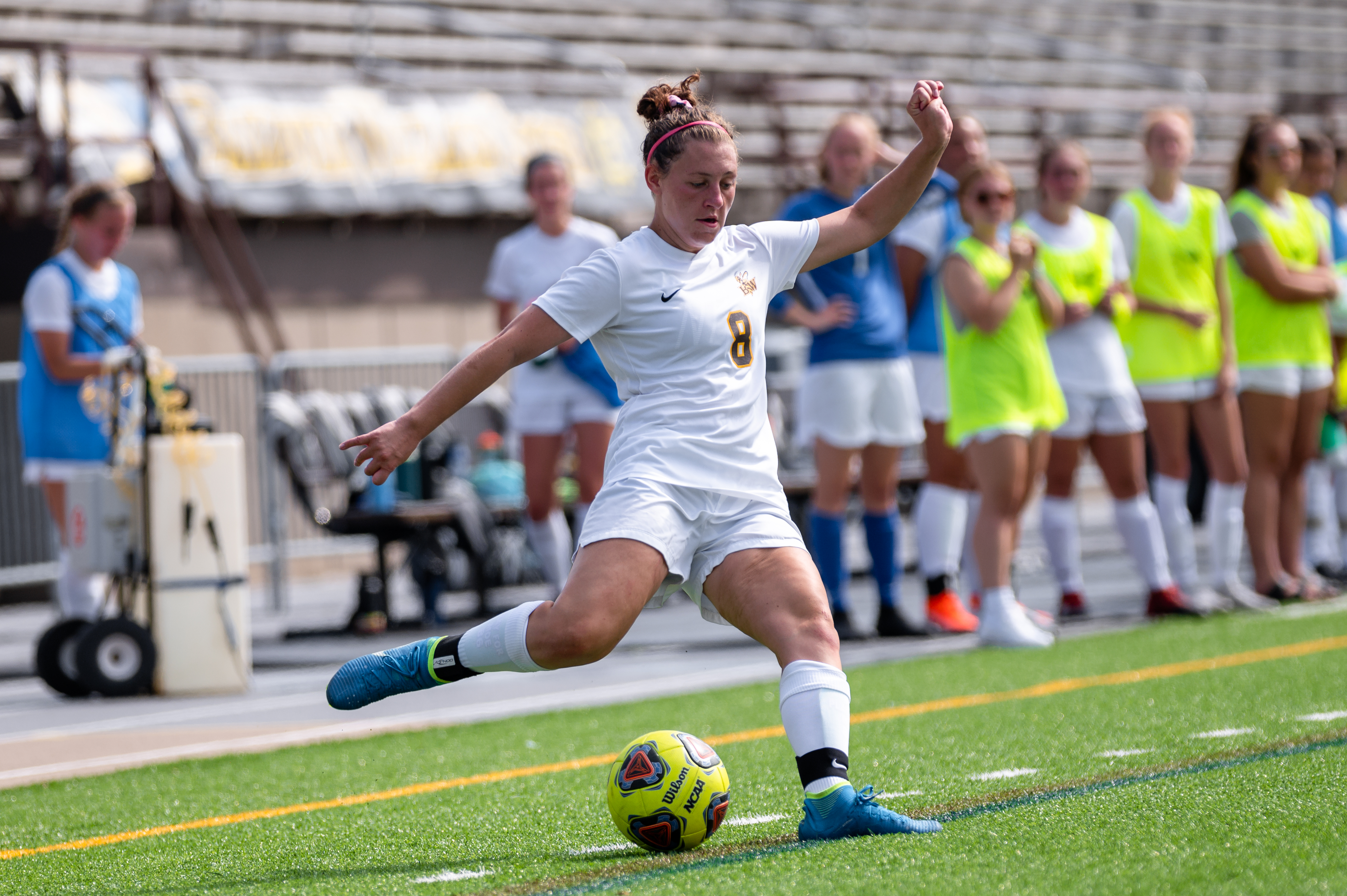
A Yellow Jackets women's soccer game in 2021

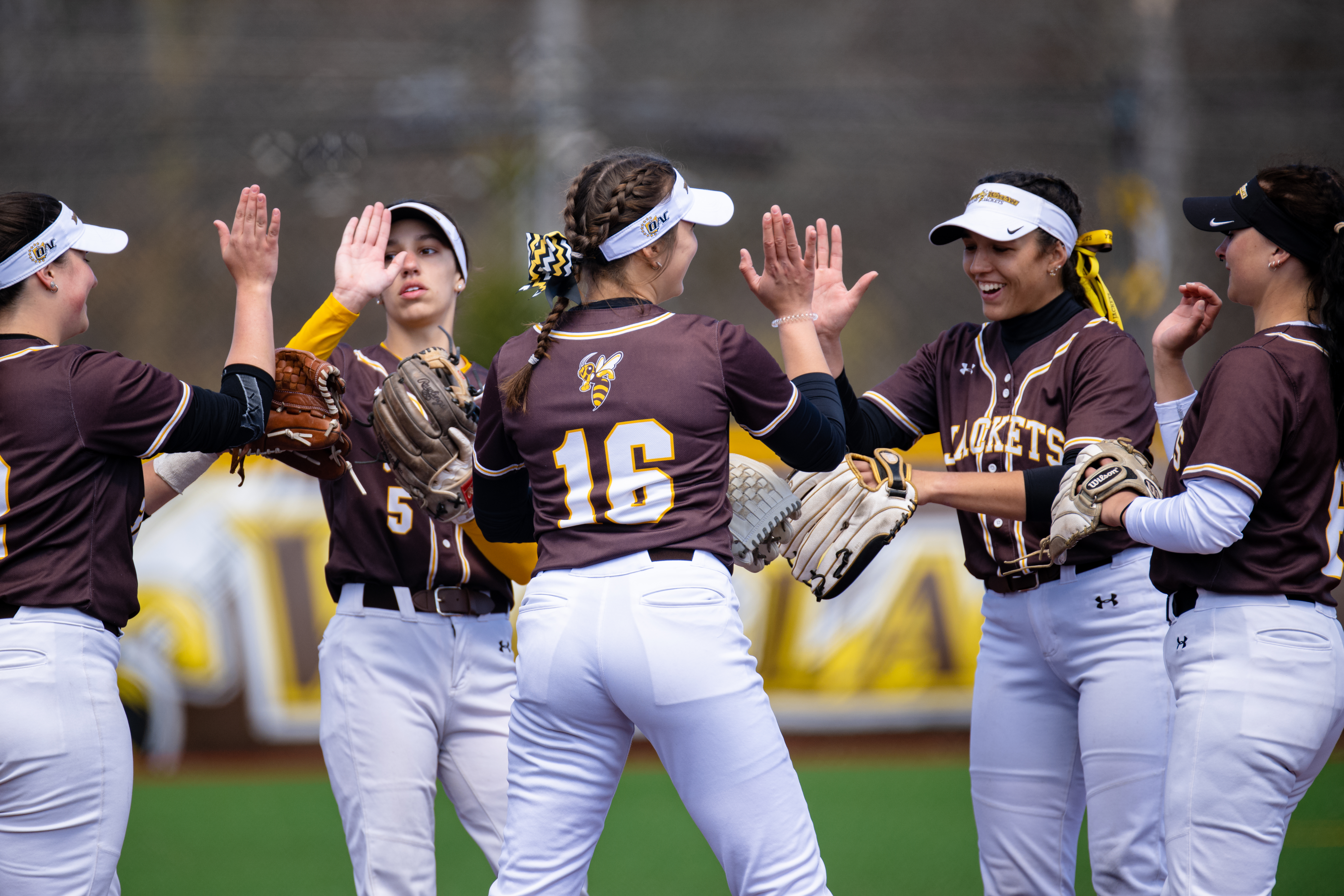
A Yellow Jackets softball game in 2022

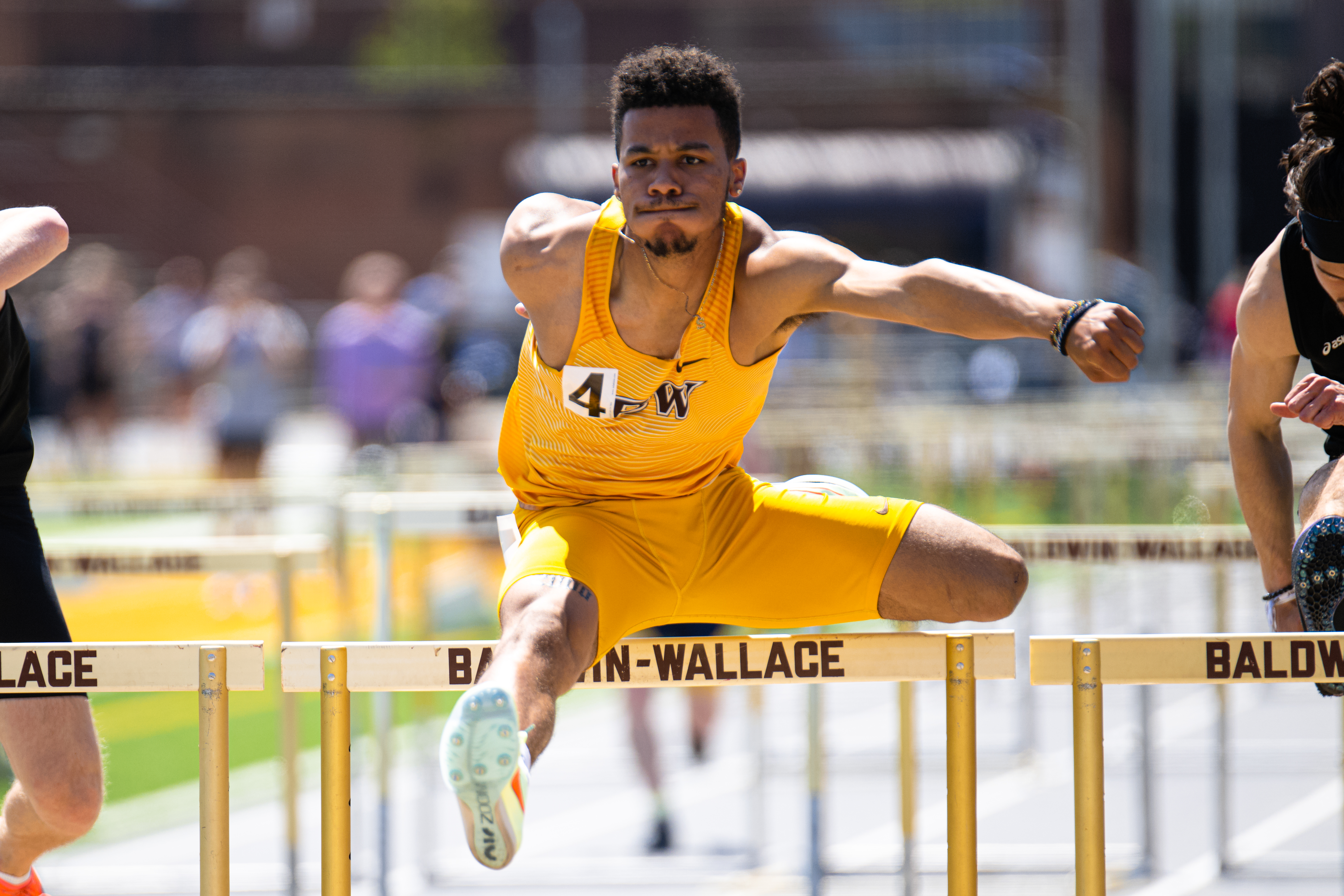
A Yellow Jackets men's track and field meet in 2022

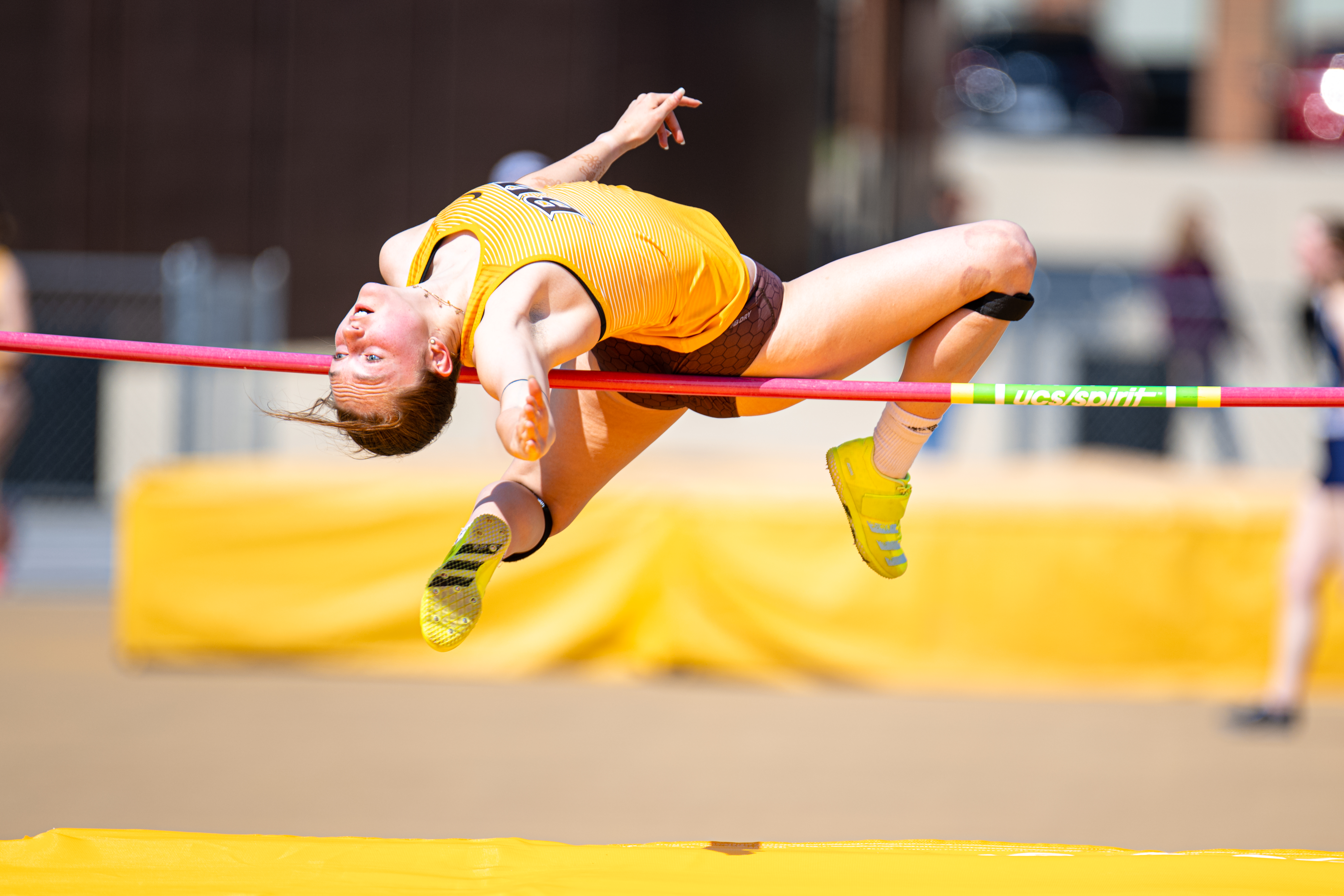
A Yellow Jackets women's track and field meet in 2022

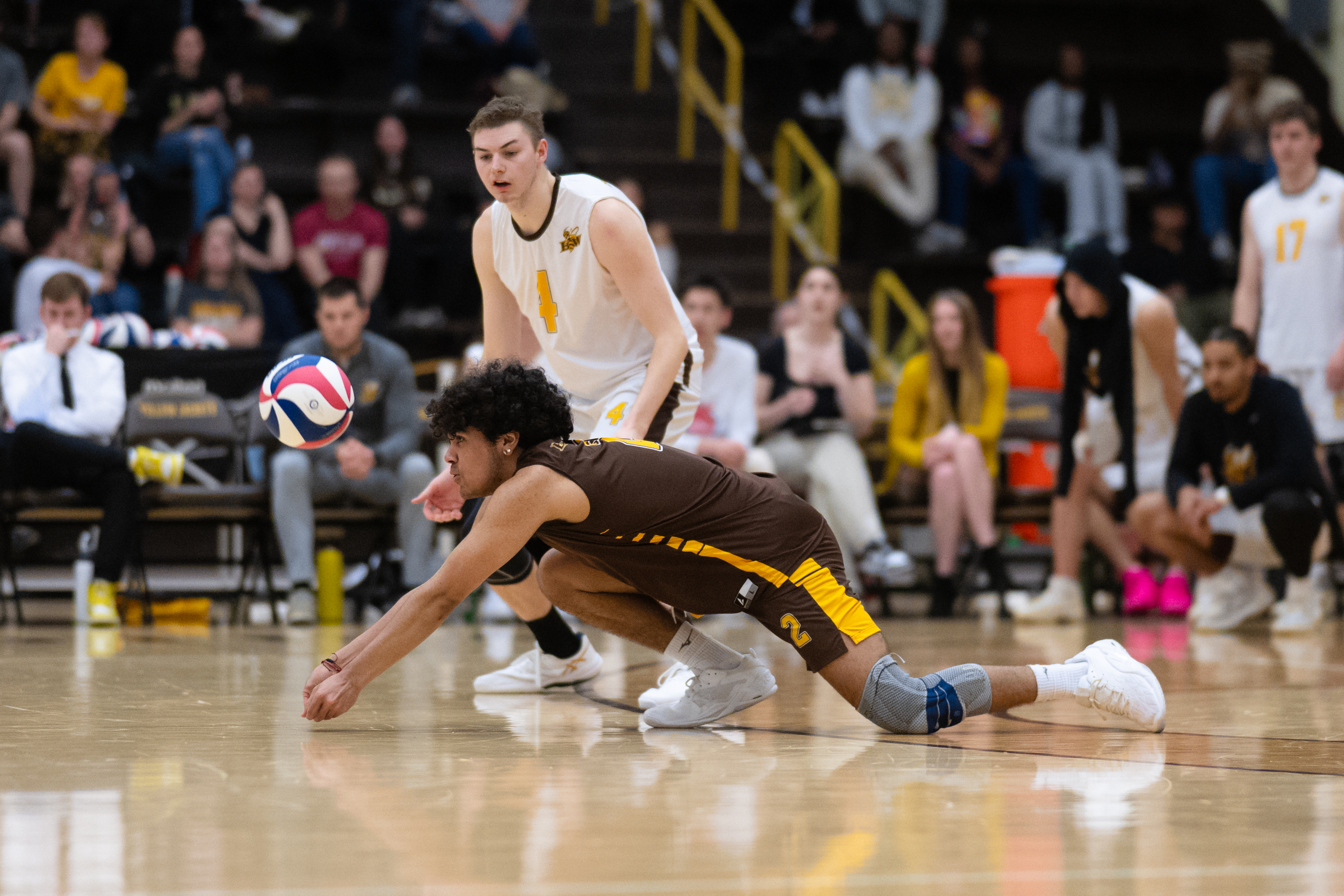
A Yellow Jackets men's volleyball match in 2025

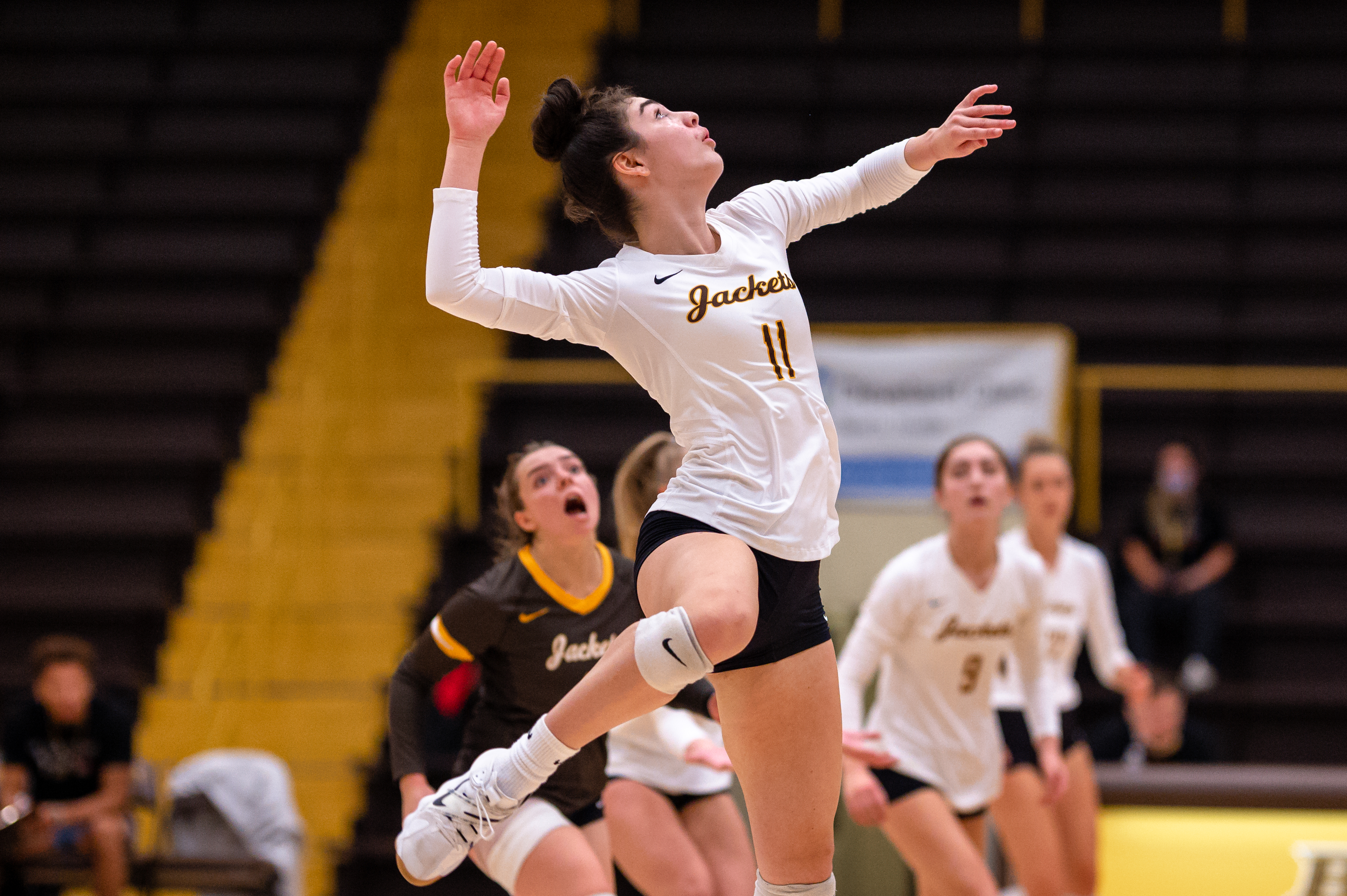
A Yellow Jackets women's volleyball match in 2021

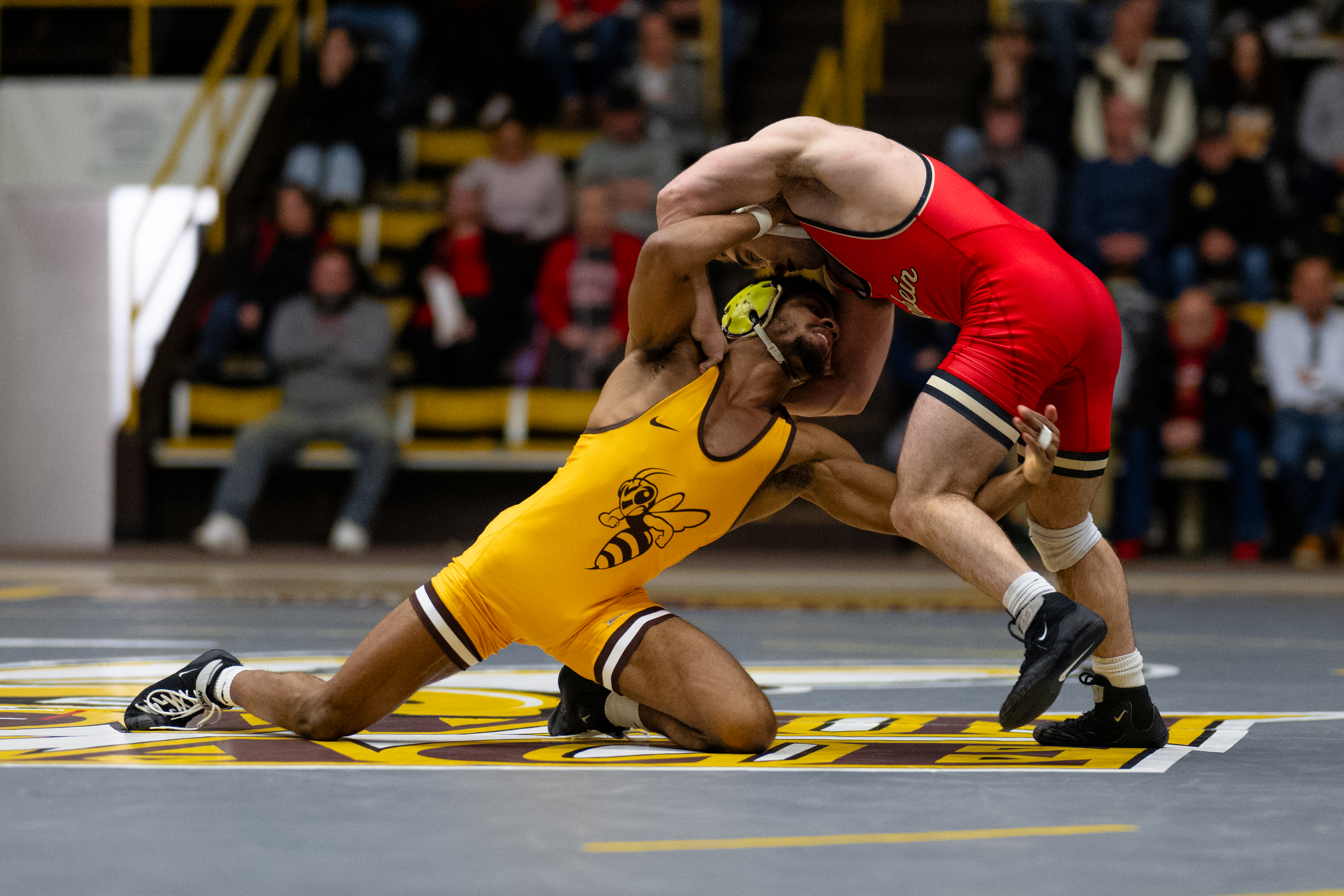
A Yellow Jackets wrestling match in 2025

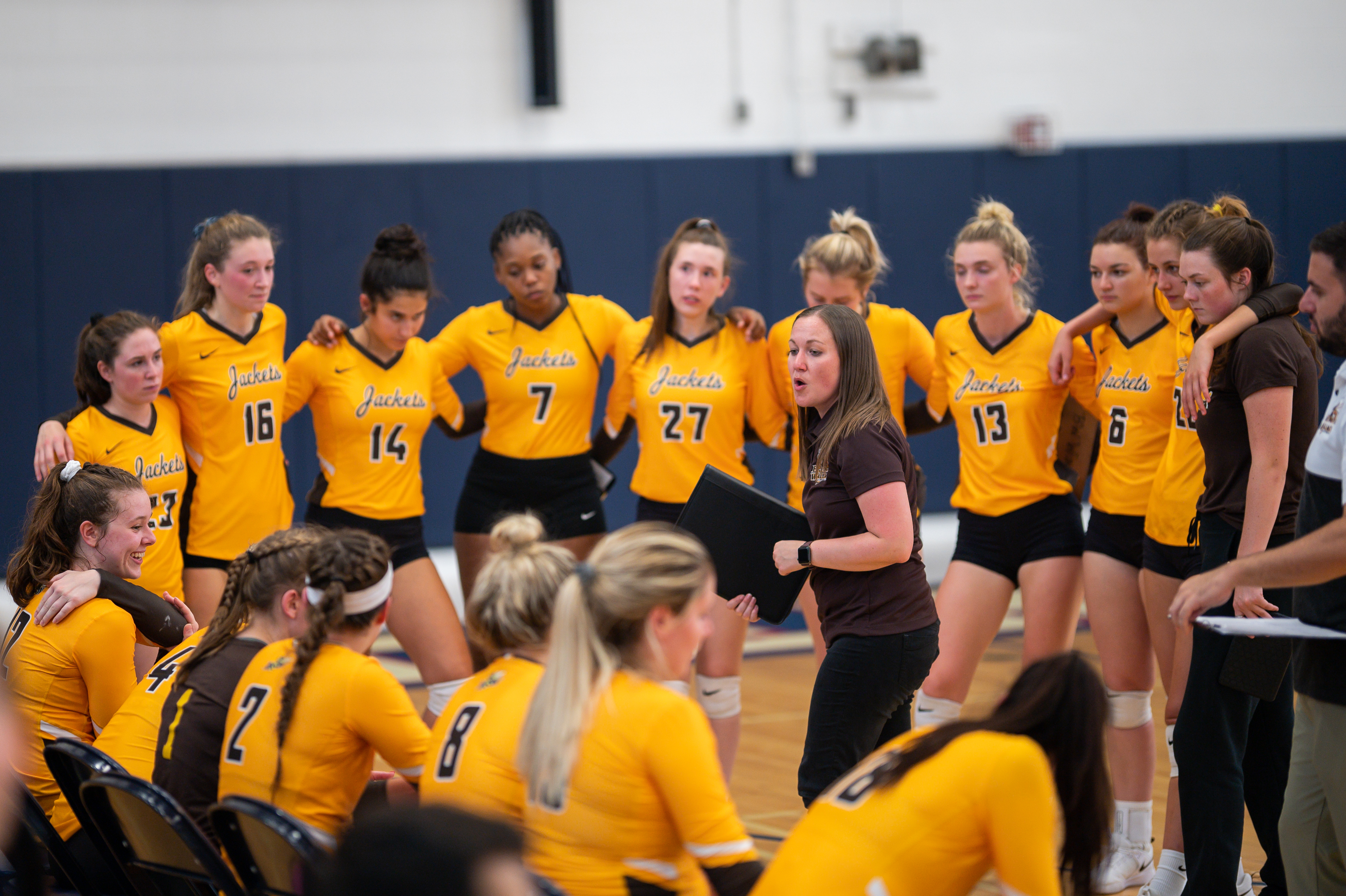
The Yellow Jackets women's volleyball team in 2019
