= Bob Packard (American football) =

American football coach (1943–2007)

Biographical details
- Born: c. 1943
- Died: October 20, 2007 (aged 63–64)
- Education: Baldwin–Wallace College (1965)

Playing career
- 1961–1964: Baldwin–Wallace
- Position: Quarterback

Coaching career (HC unless noted)
- 1965: Colorado (GA)
- 1966–1967: Orrville HS (OH) (assistant)
- 1968–1973: Baldwin–Wallace (assistant)
- 1974–1980: Baldwin–Wallace (OC)
- 1981–2001: Baldwin–Wallace

Head coaching record
- Overall: 154–56–2
- Tournaments: 0–2 (NCAA D-III playoffs)

Accomplishments and honors

Championships
- 6 OAC (1982–1984, 1988, 1991, 1994); 2 OAC Red Division (1982–1983); 1 OAC Blue Division (1984)

Robert D. Packard (c. 1943 – October 20, 2007) was an American college football coach. He was the head football coach for Baldwin–Wallace College—now known as Baldwin Wallace University—from 1981 to 2001. he also coached for Colorado and Orrville High School. He played college football for Baldwin–Wallace as a quarterback.

Packard died of a heart attack on October 20, 2007.

== Head coaching record ==
Year	Team	Overall	Conference	Standing	Bowl/playoffs
Baldwin–Wallace Yellow Jackets (Ohio Athletic Conference) (1981–2001)
1981	Baldwin–Wallace	8–2	5–0	1st (Red)	
1982	Baldwin–Wallace	10–1	5–0	1st (Red)	L NCAA Division III Quarterfinal
1983	Baldwin–Wallace	6–4	5–0	1st (Blue)	
1984	Baldwin–Wallace	9–1	8–0	1st	
1985	Baldwin–Wallace	8–2	7–1	2nd	
1986	Baldwin–Wallace	7–3	6–2	T–2nd	
1987	Baldwin–Wallace	7–3	6–2	T–2nd	
1988	Baldwin–Wallace	8–2	7–1	T–1st	
1989	Baldwin–Wallace	5–4–1	5–2–1	4th	
1990	Baldwin–Wallace	7–2–1	6–2–1	3rd	
1991	Baldwin–Wallace	10–1	9–0	1st	L NCAA Division III First Round
1992	Baldwin–Wallace	8–2	7–2	T–2nd	
1993	Baldwin–Wallace	9–1	8–1	2nd	
1994	Baldwin–Wallace	9–1	8–1	T–1st	
1995	Baldwin–Wallace	6–4	6–3	4th	
1996	Baldwin–Wallace	6–4	6–3	T–3rd	
1997	Baldwin–Wallace	7–3	6–3	4th	
1998	Baldwin–Wallace	8–2	8–1	2nd	
1999	Baldwin–Wallace	6–4	6–3	T–3rd	
2000	Baldwin–Wallace	6–4	5–4	5th	
2001	Baldwin–Wallace	6–4	5–4	5th	
Baldwin–Wallace:		156–54–2	134–35–2		
Total:		154–56–2			
National championship Conference title Conference division title or championship game berth
