= 1978 NCAA Division III football season =

American college football season

- Regular season: August – November 1978
- Playoffs: November – December 1978
- National championship: Garrett–Harrison Stadium; Phenix City, AL
- Champion: Baldwin–Wallace

The 1978 NCAA Division III football season, part of college football in the United States organized by the National Collegiate Athletic Association at the Division III level, began in August 1978, and concluded with the NCAA Division III Football Championship in December 1978 at Garrett–Harrison Stadium in Phenix City, Alabama. The Baldwin–Wallace Yellow Jackets won their first Division III championship, defeating the Wittenberg Tigers by a score of 24−10.

== Conference standings ==
1978 College Athletic Conference football standings
	Conf.					Overall
Team	W		L		T	W		L		T
Southwestern (TN) +	3	–	1	–	0	6	–	3	–	0
Sewanee +	3	–	1	–	0	4	–	4	–	0
Rose–Hulman	2	–	2	–	0	5	–	4	–	1
Centre	2	–	2	–	0	3	–	6	–	0
Principia	0	–	4	–	0	0	–	9	–	0
+ – Conference co-champions

1978 College Conference of Illinois and Wisconsin football standings
	Conf.					Overall
Team	W		L		T	W		L		T
No. 11 Elmhurst +	7	–	1	–	0	8	–	1	–	0
Millikin +	7	–	1	–	0	8	–	1	–	0
North Central (IL)	5	–	3	–	0	6	–	3	–	0
Carroll (WI)	5	–	3	–	0	6	–	3	–	0
Wheaton (IL)	5	–	3	–	0	6	–	3	–	0
Augustana (IL)	3	–	5	–	0	4	–	5	–	0
Illinois Wesleyan	3	–	5	–	0	4	–	5	–	0
Carthage	1	–	7	–	0	1	–	8	–	0
North Park	0	–	8	–	0	0	–	9	–	0
+ – Conference co-champions; Rankings from NAIA Division II poll

1978 Iowa Conference football standings
	Conf.					Overall
Team	W		L		T	W		L		T
Buena Vista +	5	–	2	–	0	7	–	2	–	0
Dubuque +	5	–	2	–	0	7	–	2	–	0
Luther +	5	–	2	–	0	6	–	3	–	0
Central (IA) +	5	–	2	–	0	5	–	4	–	0
Wartburg	3	–	4	–	0	4	–	5	–	0
Simpson (IA)	2	–	5	–	0	4	–	5	–	0
Upper Iowa	2	–	5	–	0	4	–	6	–	0
William Penn	1	–	6	–	0	1	–	9	–	0
+ – Conference co-champions

1978 Independent College Athletic Conference football standings
	Conf.					Overall
Team	W		L		T	W		L		T
Ithaca $^	3	–	0	–	0	9	–	2	–	0
St. Lawrence ^	3	–	1	–	0	8	–	2	–	0
Alfred	1	–	2	–	0	5	–	4	–	0
Hobart	1	–	3	–	0	2	–	6	–	0
RPI	0	–	2	–	0	1	–	8	–	0
$ – Conference champion; ^ – NCAA Division III playoff participant

1978 Metropolitan Intercollegiate Conference football standings
	Conf.					Overall
Team	W		L		T	W		L		T
Pace $	5	–	0	–	0	6	–	2	–	0
Brooklyn	3	–	2	–	0	5	–	4	–	0
Iona	2	–	2	–	0	5	–	4	–	0
Saint Peter's	2	–	2	–	0	5	–	4	–	0
St. John's	2	–	3	–	0	5	–	5	–	0
Marist	0	–	5	–	0	1	–	8	–	0
$ – Conference champion

1978 Michigan Intercollegiate Athletic Association football standings
	Conf.					Overall
Team	W		L		T	W		L		T
Hope $	5	–	0	–	0	8	–	1	–	0
Adrian	4	–	1	–	0	6	–	3	–	0
Kalamazoo	3	–	2	–	0	6	–	2	–	0
Albion	2	–	3	–	0	3	–	5	–	0
Olivet	1	–	4	–	0	2	–	7	–	0
Alma	0	–	5	–	0	4	–	5	–	0
$ – Conference champion

1978 Middle Atlantic Conference football standings
	Conf.					Overall
Team	W		L		T	W		L		T
Northern Division
Lycoming x	5	–	1	–	0	7	–	2	–	0
Upsala x	5	–	1	–	0	7	–	2	–	0
Juniata	4	–	2	–	0	5	–	4	–	0
Wilkes	3	–	3	–	0	4	–	5	–	0
Albright	3	–	3	–	0	3	–	6	–	0
Susquehanna	1	–	5	–	0	1	–	8	–	0
Delaware Valley	0	–	6	–	0	1	–	8	–	0
Southern Division
Widener x	5	–	1	–	0	8	–	1	–	0
Western Maryland	5	–	1	–	1	7	–	1	–	1
Franklin & Marshall	6	–	2	–	0	7	–	2	–	0
Muhlenberg	5	–	2	–	1	6	–	2	–	1
Gettysburg	3	–	3	–	0	5	–	5	–	0
Dickinson	3	–	4	–	1	3	–	5	–	1
Lebanon Valley	3	–	4	–	0	5	–	4	–	0
Swarthmore	3	–	5	–	0	4	–	5	–	0
Moravian	2	–	5	–	1	3	–	5	–	1
Johns Hopkins	2	–	5	–	0	3	–	6	–	0
Ursinus	1	–	6	–	0	2	–	7	–	0
x – Division champion/co-champions

1978 Midwest Conference football standings
	Conf.					Overall
Team	W		L		T	W		L		T
Red Division
Ripon xy$	4	–	1	–	0	8	–	2	–	0
Cornell (IA) x	4	–	1	–	0	7	–	2	–	0
Lawrence	3	–	2	–	0	7	–	2	–	0
Monmouth (IL)	2	–	3	–	0	5	–	3	–	0
Coe	2	–	3	–	0	4	–	5	–	0
Knox	0	–	5	–	0	2	–	6	–	0
Blue Division
Lake Forest xy	4	–	0	–	0	5	–	4	–	0
Beloit	3	–	1	–	0	4	–	4	–	0
Carleton	2	–	2	–	0	3	–	5	–	0
Chicago	1	–	3	–	0	3	–	5	–	0
Grinnell	0	–	4	–	0	2	–	6	–	0
Championship: Ripon 25, Lake Forest 7
$ – Conference champion; x – Division champion/co-champions; y – Championship game participant

1978 Minnesota Intercollegiate Athletic Conference football standings
	Conf.					Overall
Team	W		L		T	W		L		T
No. 1 Concordia–Moorhead * +	7	–	1	–	0	11	–	1	–	0
St. Olaf +^	7	–	1	–	0	9	–	2	–	0
No. 15 Gustavus Adolphus	6	–	2	–	0	8	–	2	–	0
No. T–20 Saint John's (MN)	5	–	3	–	0	6	–	3	–	0
St. Thomas (MN)	4	–	4	–	0	5	–	4	–	0
Hamline	3	–	4	–	1	5	–	4	–	1
Augsburg	2	–	5	–	1	3	–	6	–	1
Bethel (MN)	1	–	7	–	0	2	–	8	–	0
Macalester	0	–	8	–	0	0	–	9	–	0
+ – Conference co-champions; ^ – NCAA Division III playoff participant; * – NAIA Division II playoff participant; Rankings from NAIA Division II poll

1978 New England Football Conference standings
	Conf.					Overall
Team	W		L		T	W		L		T
Nichols +	6	–	2	–	0	6	–	2	–	0
Boston State +	6	–	2	–	0	6	–	3	–	0
Massachusetts Maritime	5	–	3	–	0	6	–	3	–	0
New Haven	5	–	3	–	0	6	–	3	–	0
Curry	4	–	3	–	1	5	–	3	–	1
Framingham State	4	–	4	–	0	5	–	4	–	0
Bridgewater State	3	–	5	–	0	3	–	6	–	0
Plymouth State	2	–	6	–	0	3	–	6	–	0
Maine Maritime	0	–	7	–	1	0	–	7	–	1
+ – Conference co-champions

1978 New England Small College Athletic Conference football standings
	Conf.					Overall
Team	W		L		T	W		L		T
Trinity (CT)	6	–	1	–	0	7	–	1	–	0
Tufts	5	–	2	–	0	5	–	3	–	0
Wesleyan	4	–	2	–	0	6	–	2	–	0
Bates	4	–	2	–	0	6	–	2	–	0
Williams	4	–	3	–	0	5	–	3	–	0
Middlebury	3	–	3	–	0	5	–	3	–	0
Amherst	2	–	4	–	0	3	–	5	–	0
Bowdoin	2	–	5	–	0	3	–	5	–	0
Hamilton	1	–	4	–	0	1	–	7	–	0
Colby	1	–	6	–	0	2	–	6	–	0
The NESCAC did not recognize an official conference champion until 2000

1978 New Jersey State Athletic Conference football standings
	Conf.					Overall
Team	W		L		T	W		L		T
Montclair State $	5	–	0	–	0	8	–	2	–	0
Glassboro State	4	–	1	–	0	7	–	3	–	0
Trenton State	3	–	2	–	0	6	–	3	–	0
William Paterson	2	–	3	–	0	3	–	7	–	0
Jersey City State	1	–	4	–	0	2	–	7	–	0
Kean	0	–	5	–	0	3	–	7	–	0
$ – Conference champion

1978 Northern Intercollegiate Conference football standings
	Conf.					Overall
Team	W		L		T	W		L		T
Minnesota Morris $^	8	–	0	–	0	11	–	1	–	0
Minnesota Duluth	6	–	2	–	0	7	–	3	–	0
St. Cloud State	6	–	2	–	0	6	–	5	–	0
Moorhead State	5	–	3	–	0	6	–	5	–	0
Mankato State	4	–	4	–	0	7	–	4	–	0
Michigan Tech	4	–	4	–	0	4	–	6	–	0
Winona State	2	–	6	–	0	2	–	9	–	0
Southwest State (MN)	1	–	7	–	0	2	–	8	–	0
Bemidji State	0	–	8	–	0	0	–	9	–	0
$ – Conference champion; ^ – NCAA Division III playoff participant

1978 Ohio Athletic Conference football standings
	Conf.					Overall
Team	W		L		T	W		L		T
Blue Division
Wittenberg xy+^	5	–	0	–	0	10	–	1	–	1
Capital	3	–	2	–	0	6	–	3	–	0
Wooster	3	–	2	–	0	6	–	3	–	0
Marietta	2	–	3	–	0	5	–	4	–	0
Muskingum	1	–	4	–	0	3	–	5	–	1
Otterbein	1	–	4	–	0	2	–	6	–	1
Red Division
Baldwin–Wallace xy+^	5	–	0	–	0	11	–	0	–	1
Ohio Northern	3	–	2	–	0	5	–	4	–	0
Denison	3	–	2	–	0	4	–	4	–	1
Mount Union	2	–	3	–	0	4	–	4	–	1
Ohio Wesleyan	2	–	3	–	0	3	–	5	–	1
Heidelberg	0	–	5	–	0	0	–	9	–	0
Not competing for championship
Kenyon			–			3	–	6	–	0
Oberlin			–			0	–	9	–	0
Championship: Baldwin–Wallace 17, Wittenberg 17
+ – Conference co-champions; x – Division champion/co-champions; y – Championship game participant; ^ – NCAA Division III playoff participant

1978 Old Dominion Athletic Conference football standings
	Conf.					Overall
Team	W		L		T	W		L		T
Randolph–Macon $	4	–	0	–	0	5	–	4	–	0
Hampden–Sydney	2	–	2	–	0	5	–	5	–	0
Emory & Henry	2	–	2	–	0	2	–	7	–	0
Bridgewater	1	–	3	–	0	3	–	6	–	0
Washington and Lee	1	–	3	–	0	2	–	8	–	0
$ – Conference champion

1978 Pennsylvania State Athletic Conference football standings
	Conf.					Overall
Team	W		L		T	W		L		T
East Division
East Stroudsburg xy$	5	–	0	–	0	10	–	1	–	0
Cheyney	4	–	1	–	0	6	–	3	–	0
Bloomsburg	3	–	2	–	0	6	–	4	–	0
Millersville	2	–	3	–	0	6	–	3	–	0
Kutztown	1	–	4	–	0	2	–	7	–	0
Mansfield	0	–	5	–	0	2	–	8	–	0
West Division
No. 17 Clarion xy	5	–	1	–	0	8	–	3	–	0
Shippensburg x	5	–	1	–	0	7	–	3	–	0
Slippery Rock	4	–	2	–	0	6	–	3	–	0
Edinboro	3	–	3	–	0	3	–	6	–	1
Indiana (PA)	2	–	4	–	0	4	–	5	–	1
California (PA)	1	–	4	–	1	2	–	7	–	1
Lock Haven	0	–	5	–	1	1	–	8	–	1
Championship: East Stroudsburg 49, Clarion 4
$ – Conference champion; x – Division champion/co-champions; y – Championship game participant; Shippensburg was ineligible for conference title game.; Rankings from NAIA Division I poll

1978 Presidents' Athletic Conference football standings
	Conf.					Overall
Team	W		L		T	W		L		T
Carnegie Mellon $^	6	–	1	–	0	9	–	2	–	0
Hiram	5	–	2	–	0	6	–	2	–	0
John Carroll	4	–	3	–	0	5	–	4	–	0
Washington & Jefferson	4	–	3	–	0	5	–	4	–	0
Allegheny	3	–	3	–	1	4	–	3	–	1
Thiel	3	–	3	–	1	4	–	4	–	1
Bethany (WV)	2	–	5	–	0	2	–	6	–	0
Case Western Reserve	0	–	7	–	0	2	–	7	–	0
$ – Conference champion; ^ – NCAA Division III playoff participant

1978 Southern Intercollegiate Athletic Conference football standings
	Conf.					Overall
Team	W		L		T	W		L		T
Division I
No. 3 Florida A&M x^	5	–	0	–	0	12	–	1	–	0
Bethune–Cookman	3	–	2	–	0	7	–	3	–	1
Alabama A&M	4	–	1	–	0	7	–	4	–	0
Morris Brown	4	–	4	–	0	5	–	5	–	0
Albany State	3	–	3	–	1	4	–	5	–	1
Tuskegee	3	–	3	–	0	3	–	7	–	0
Division II
Clark x	7	–	2	–	0	7	–	2	–	0
Fort Valley State	4	–	3	–	2	6	–	3	–	2
Knoxville	5	–	2	–	0	6	–	4	–	0
Morehouse	4	–	5	–	0	4	–	5	–	0
Savannah State	4	–	5	–	0	4	–	6	–	0
Miles	2	–	5	–	1	2	–	6	–	1
Lane	1	–	4	–	2	1	–	5	–	2
x – Division champion/co-champions; ^ – NCAA Division I-AA playoff participant; Rankings from Associated Press poll

1978 Southern California Intercollegiate Athletic Conference football standings
	Conf.					Overall
Team	W		L		T	W		L		T
Redlands $	5	–	0	–	0	9	–	1	–	0
Claremont-Mudd	4	–	1	–	0	6	–	3	–	0
Whittier	3	–	2	–	0	6	–	3	–	0
Occidental	2	–	3	–	0	4	–	6	–	0
La Verne	1	–	4	–	0	1	–	7	–	0
Pomona-Pitzer	0	–	5	–	0	0	–	7	–	0
$ – Conference champion

1978 Wisconsin State University Conference football standings
	Conf.					Overall
Team	W		L		T	W		L		T
No. 7 Wisconsin–La Crosse +^	7	–	1	–	0	9	–	2	–	0
Wisconsin–Whitewater +	7	–	1	–	0	7	–	4	–	0
No. 12 Wisconsin–Eau Claire	6	–	2	–	0	8	–	2	–	0
Wisconsin–Stout	5	–	3	–	0	7	–	3	–	0
Wisconsin–Oshkosh	3	–	5	–	0	4	–	6	–	0
Wisconsin–River Falls	3	–	5	–	0	4	–	6	–	0
Wisconsin–Stevens Point	2	–	6	–	0	4	–	6	–	0
Wisconsin–Platteville	2	–	5	–	0	3	–	7	–	0
Wisconsin–Superior	1	–	7	–	0	2	–	9	–	0
+ – Conference co-champions; ^ – NAIA Division I playoff participant; Rankings from NAIA Division I poll

1978 NCAA Division III independents football records
	Conf.			Overall
Team	W	L	T	W		L		T
Maryville (TN)		–		8	–	1	–	0
Wabash		–		8	–	1	–	0
Georgetown		–		7	–	1	–	0
James Madison		–		8	–	2	–	0
Dayton ^		–		9	–	2	–	1
Albany		–		7	–	3	–	0
Catholic University		–		7	–	3	–	0
Fordham		–		7	–	3	–	0
Saint Mary's		–		7	–	3	–	0
San Diego		–		7	–	3	–	0
Towson State		–		7	–	3	–	0
Colorado College		–		6	–	3	–	0
Merchant Marine		–		5	–	5	–	0
Bowie State		–		5	–	4	–	0
Brockport		–		5	–	4	–	0
Millsaps		–		5	–	4	–	0
Norwich		–		5	–	4	–	0
Rochester (NY)		–		5	–	4	–	0
Cortland		–		5	–	5	–	0
Grove City		–		4	–	4	–	1
Salisbury State		–		5	–	5	–	0
Canisius		–		4	–	5	–	0
Hofstra		–		4	–	5	–	0
Saint Francis (PA)		–		4	–	5	–	0
Union (NY)		–		3	–	5	–	0
Buffalo		–		3	–	6	–	0
Frostburg State		–		3	–	7	–	0
St. Norbert		–		3	–	7	–	0
Plattsburgh		–		2	–	6	–	0
DePauw		–		2	–	7	–	0
Wagner		–		2	–	8	–	0
Fairleigh Dickinson–Florham		–		1	–	8	–	0
^ – NCAA Division III playoff participant

== Conference champions ==
Conference champions
- College Athletic Conference – Southwestern at Memphis and Sewanee
- College Conference of Illinois and Wisconsin – Elmhurst and Millikin
- Independent College Athletic Conference – Ithaca
- Iowa Intercollegiate Athletic Conference – Buena Vista, Central (IA), Dubuque, and Luther
- Michigan Intercollegiate Athletic Association – Hope
- Middle Atlantic Conference – Lycoming (North), Widener (South)
- Midwest Collegiate Athletic Conference – Cornell College and Ripon
- Minnesota Intercollegiate Athletic Conference – Concordia–Moorhead and St. Olaf
- New England Football Conference – Boston State and Nichols
- New Jersey State Athletic Conference – Montclair State
- Northwest Conference – Linfield
- Old Dominion Athletic Conference – Randolph-Macon
- Pennsylvania State Athletic Conference – East Stroudsburg
- Southern Intercollegiate Athletic Conference - Clark
- Southern California Intercollegiate Athletic Conference – Redlands
- Texas Intercollegiate Athletic Association – Tarleton State
- Twin Rivers Conference – Northwestern (WI)
- Wisconsin Intercollegiate Athletic Conference – Wisconsin–La Crosse and Wisconsin–Whitewater

== Postseason ==
The 1978 NCAA Division III Football Championship playoffs were the sixth annual single-elimination tournament to determine the national champion of men's NCAA Division III college football. The championship game was held at Garrett-Harrison Stadium in Phenix City, Alabama for the sixth consecutive year. Like the previous three championships, eight teams competed in this edition.

=== Playoff bracket ===
Quarterfinals; Campus sites
Minnesota–Morris	23
St. Olaf	10
Wittenberg	6
Ithaca	3
Carnegie Mellon	24
Dayton	21
Baldwin–Wallace	71
St. Lawrence	7

Semifinals; Campus sites
Minnesota–Morris	14
Wittenberg	35
Carnegie Mellon	6
Baldwin–Wallace	31

National Championship Game; Garrett–Harrison Stadium; Phenix City, AL
Wittenberg	10
Baldwin–Wallace	24

== See also ==
- 1978 NCAA Division I-A football season
- 1978 NCAA Division I-AA football season
- 1978 NCAA Division II football season
- 1978 NAIA Division I football season
- 1978 NAIA Division II football season
