= Mike Van Diest =

American football coach (born 1950s)

Biographical details
- Born: c. 1951 or 1952 (age 73–74); Helena, Montana, U.S.

Playing career
- 1971–1972: Wyoming
- 1974: Wyoming
- 1975: Washington Redskins*
- Positions: Guard, linebacker

Coaching career (HC unless noted)
- 1977: Wyoming (GA)
- 1978: Wyoming (DT)
- 1979: Wyoming (co-JV)
- 1980–1985: Montana (DL)
- 1986: UMass (DL)
- 1987–1990: Northwestern (DL)
- 1991–1998: Wyoming (DL)
- 1999–2018: Carroll (MT)
- 2020 (spring): Mary (assistant)
- 2020: Helena HS (MT) (volunteer)
- 2021: Montana State–Northern (DC)

Head coaching record
- Overall: 203–54
- Tournaments: 35–8 (NAIA playoffs)

Accomplishments and honors

Championships
- 6 NAIA (2002–2005, 2007, 2010); 14 Frontier (2000–2011, 2013–2014)

Awards
- 4× NAIA Coach of the Year (2003, 2005, 2007, 2010); 2× AFCA NAIA Coach of the Year (2007, 2010)

Mike Van Diest (born c. 1951 or 1952) is an American college football coach. He was the head football coach at Carroll College in Helena, Montana from 1999 to 2018, compiling a record of 203–54. Van Diest's Carroll Fighting Saints won six NAIA National Championships, four consecutively from 2002 to 2005, a fifth in 2007, and a sixth in 2010.

== Playing career ==
Van Diest played college football for Wyoming between 1971 and 1974. He was listed as a tight end and offensive guard throughout his career. Following his graduation in 1975, he signed with the Washington Redskins of the National Football League (NFL) as a linebacker.

== Coaching career ==
Van Diest began his coaching career in 1977 as a graduate assistant for his alma mater, Wyoming. In 1978, he was promoted to the defensive tackles coach position. In 1979, he served as the co-head coach of the junior varsity team for Wyoming. In that same year he was hired as the head strength and conditioning coach.

In 1980, Van Diest was hired as the defensive line coach for Montana. He maintained that position for six years before being hired in the same position for UMass. After only one season with UMass, he was hired as the defensive line coach for Northwestern. In 1991, he rejoined his alma mater as the defensive line coach.

In 1999, Van Diest took his first head coaching position as the head football coach for Carroll College. He maintained the position for twenty seasons and led the team to an overall record of 203–54 and six NAIA National Championships. He retired after the 2018 season.

In the spring of 2020, Van Diest came out of retirement to coach for Mary. The season was ultimately cancelled due to COVID-19 before he coached a game for the Marauders. He spent the fall of 2020 as a volunteer assistant for Helena High School. In 2021, he joined Montana State–Northern as the team's defensive coordinator—his first coordinator position of his entire career. He retired after one season.

== Head coaching record ==
Year	Team	Overall	Conference	Standing	Bowl/playoffs	NAIA^{#}
Carroll Fighting Saints (Frontier Conference) (1999–2018)
1999	Carroll	5–6	5–3	3rd		
2000	Carroll	10–4	6–2	1st	L NAIA Semifinal	3
2001	Carroll	10–2	7–1	1st	L NAIA Semifinal	3
2002	Carroll	12–2	7–1	1st	W NAIA Championship	1
2003	Carroll	15–0	8–0	1st	W NAIA Championship	1
2004	Carroll	12–2	6–2	T–1st	W NAIA Championship	1
2005	Carroll	14–0	8–0	1st	W NAIA Championship	1
2006	Carroll	11–2	9–1	1st	L NAIA Quarterfinal	5
2007	Carroll	15–0	10–0	1st	W NAIA Championship	1
2008	Carroll	13–1	10–0	1st	L NAIA Championship	2
2009	Carroll	13–1	8–1	1st	L NAIA Semifinal	3
2010	Carroll	14–0	10–0	1st	W NAIA Championship	1
2011	Carroll	13–2	9–1	1st	L NAIA Championship	2
2012	Carroll	7–4	7–3	3rd		21
2013	Carroll	12–2	9–1	1st	L NAIA Seminfinal	3
2014	Carroll	10–2	9–1	1st	L NAIA Quarterfinal	5
2015	Carroll	4–6	4–6	T–4th		
2016	Carroll	4–6	4–6	T–5th		
2017	Carroll	4–6	4–6	T–5th		
2018	Carroll	5–6	4–6	7th		
Carroll:		203–54	144–41			
Total:		203–54				
National championship Conference title Conference division title or championship game berth
^{#}Rankings from final NAIA Coaches' Poll.

== See also ==
- List of college football career coaching wins leaders
- List of college football career coaching winning percentage leaders
