= Carl Poelker =

American athletics coach (1944–2026)

Biographical details
- Born: February 6, 1944; Elgin, Illinois, U.S.
- Died: March 17, 2026 (aged 82); Forsyth, Illinois, U.S.

Playing career

Football
- c. 1967: Millikin
- Position: Defensive lineman

Coaching career (HC unless noted)

Football
- 1973–1981: Millikin (DC)
- 1982–1995: Millikin
- 1996–2012: McKendree

Head coaching record
- Overall: 205–100–1 (football)
- Tournaments: Football; 1–1 (NCAA D-III playoffs); 3–9 (NAIA playoffs)

Accomplishments and honors

Championships
- Football; 2 CCIW (1989–1990); 7 MSFA Midwest (1999, 2002–2005, 2009–2010)

Awards
- NAIA Coach of the Year (2002); 2× CCIW Coach of the Year (1984, 1989)

Carl R. Poelker (February 6, 1944 – March 17, 2026) was an American football, wrestling, and track and field coach. He served as head football coach at Millikin University from 1982 to 1995 and at McKendree University from 1996 to 2012, compiling a career college football coaching record of 205–100–1. Poelker graduated from Millikin in 1968. There he lettered on the football team for three seasons as a defensive lineman. He also played basketball for two years and ran track for one. In 1973 he was a named an instructor in physical education, defensive coordinator for the football team, and head wrestling coach at his alma mater.

Poelker died on March 17, 2026, at the Arc at Hickory Point in Forsyth, Illinois, at the age of 82.

== Head coaching record ==
=== Football ===
Year	Team	Overall	Conference	Standing	Bowl/playoffs	NAIA^{#}
Millikin Big Blue (College Conference of Illinois and Wisconsin) (1982–1995)
1982	Millikin	5–3–1	5–2–1	3rd		
1983	Millikin	4–5	4–4	4th		
1984	Millikin	8–1	7–1	2nd		
1985	Millikin	7–2	6–2	T–2nd		
1986	Millikin	7–2	6–2	2nd		
1987	Millikin	6–3	6–2	2nd		
1988	Millikin	7–2	6–2	T–3rd		
1989	Millikin	10–1	8–0	1st	L NCAA Division III Quarterfinal	
1990	Millikin	7–2	7–1	T–1st		
1991	Millikin	6–3	5–3	5th		
1992	Millikin	4–5	4–3	4th		
1993	Millikin	6–3	5–2	3rd		
1994	Millikin	6–3	5–2	T–3rd		
1995	Millikin	5–4	3–4	4th		
Millikin:		88–39–1	77–30–1			
McKendree Bearcats (NAIA independent) (1996–1997)
1996	McKendree	3–5				
1997	McKendree	8–2			L NAIA First Round	14
McKendree Bearcats (Mid-States Football Association) (1998–2010)
1998	McKendree	6–4	3–3	3rd (MWL)		
1999	McKendree	9–2	5–1	T–1st (MWL)	L NAIA First Round	6
2000	McKendree	7–3	5–2	3rd (MWL)		19
2001	McKendree	8–3	6–1	2nd (MWL)	L NAIA First Round	15
2002	McKendree	11–2	6–1	T–1st (MWL)	L NAIA Semifinal	4
2003	McKendree	8–3	5–2	T–1st (MWL)	L NAIA First Round	15
2004	McKendree	9–2	7–0	1st (MWL)	L NAIA First Round	12
2005	McKendree	8–3	6–1	T–1st (MWL)	L NAIA First Round	10
2006	McKendree	5–4	5–3	T–3rd (MWL)		
2007	McKendree	6–4	5–2	T–2nd (MWL)		
2008	McKendree	6–4	5–2	T–2nd (MWL)		
2009	McKendree	9–2	7–0	1st (MWL)	L NAIA First Round	9
2010	McKendree	9–3	6–1	T–1st (MWL)	L NAIA Quarterfinal	23
McKendree Bearcats (NCAA Division II independent) (2011)
2011	McKendree	2–8				
McKendree Bearcats (Great Lakes Valley Conference) (2012)
2012	McKendree	3–7	3–5	6th		
McKendree:		117–61	74–24			
Total:		205–100–1				
National championship Conference title Conference division title or championship game berth

== See also ==
- List of college football career coaching wins leaders
