= NAIA Football Coach of the Year Award =

American football award

- Awarded for: Best college football coach in the NAIA
- Country: United States
- First award: 1956
- Currently held by: Joel Osborn, Benedictine (KS)

The NAIA Football Coach of the Year is awarded annually to the best college football coach in the National Association of Intercollegiate Athletics. From 1979 to 1996, a separate award was given to the best coach in each of the NAIA's two football divisions.

== Winners ==
=== Single award (1956–1978) ===
- Note: Even though the NAIA split its football championship into two divisions in 1970, only a single Coach of the Year award was given out until 1979.

Season(s)	Winner	Team
1956	Dewey Halford	Morningside
1957	Muddy Waters	Hillsdale
1958	Volney Ashford	Missouri Valley
1959	Clarence Stasavich	Lenoir–Rhyne
1960	Phil Sarboe	Humboldt State
1961	Carnie Smith	Pittsburg State
1962	Paul Durham	Linfield
1963	Billy Nicks	Prairie View A&M
1964	Jake Christiansen	Concordia–Moorhead
1965	John Gagliardi	Saint John's (MN)
1966	Forrest Perkins	Wisconsin State–Whitewater
1967	Harold "Deacon" Duvall	Fairmont State
1968	Billy Atkins	Troy State
1969	Jake Gaither	Florida A&M
1970 (DI & DII)	Gil Steinke	Texas A&I
1971 (DI & DII)	Bob Shoup	Cal Lutheran
1972 (DI & DII)	Jim Frazier	Missouri Southern State
1973 (DI & DII)	Larry Korver	Northwestern (IA)
1974 (DI & DII)	Gil Steinke (2)	Texas A&I
1975 (DI & DII)	Gil Steinke (3)	Texas A&I
1976 (DI & DII)	Gil Steinke (4)	Texas A&I
1977 (DI & DII)	DeWitt Jones	Abilene Christian
1978 (DI & DII)	Jim Hess	Angelo State

=== Separate awards (1979–1996) ===
==== Division I ====
Season	Winner	Team
1979	Ron Harms	Texas A&I
1980	Jerry Tolley	Elon
1981	Ron Randleman	Pittsburg State
1982	Dick Lowry	Hillsdale
1983	Harold Horton	Central Arkansas
1984	Ken Sparks	Carson–Newman
1985	Ralph Carpenter	Henderson State
1986	Dennis Franchione	Pittsburg State
1987	Dennis Franchione (2)	Pittsburg State
1988	Jon Lantz	Southeastern Oklahoma State
1989	Jeff Geiser	Adams State
1990	Mike Isom	Central Arkansas
1991	Carl Iverson	Western State (CO)
1992	Billy Joe	Central State (OH)
1993	Rich Rodriguez	Glenville State
1994	Tom Eckert	Northeastern State (OK)
1995	Rick Comegy	Central State (OH)
1996	Paul Sharp	Southwestern Oklahoma State

==== Division II ====
Season	Winner	Team
1979	Dick Strahm	Findlay
1980	Stan McGarvey	William Jewell
1981	Jim Christopherson	Concordia–Moorhead
1982	Ad Rutschman	Linfield
1983	Frosty Westering	Pacific Lutheran
1984	Ad Rutschman (2)	Linfield
1985	Larry Korver (2)	Northwestern (IA)
1986	Ad Rutschman (3)	Linfield
1987	Vacated	—
1988	Joe Fusco	Westminster (PA)
1989	Joe Fusco (2)	Westminster (PA)
1990	Tom Shea	Peru State
1991	Kevin Donley	Georgetown (KY)
1992	Dick Strahm	Findlay
1993	Frosty Westering (2)	Pacific Lutheran
1994	Gene Nicholson	Westminster (PA)
1995	Dick Strahm (2)	Findlay
1996	Bob Young	Sioux Falls

=== Single award (1997–present) ===
Year	Winner	Team	Source
1997	Dick Strahm (3)	Findlay	
1998	Vic Shealy	Azusa Pacific	
1999	Tim Albin	Northwestern Oklahoma State	
2000	Bill Cronin	Georgetown (KY)	
2001	Bill Cronin (2)	Georgetown (KY)	
2002	Carl Poelker	McKendree	
2003	Mike Van Diest	Carroll (MT)	
2004	Kevin Donley (2)	Saint Francis (IN)	
2005	Mike Van Diest (2)	Carroll (MT)	
2006	Kalen DeBoer	Sioux Falls	
2007	Mike Van Diest (3)	Carroll (MT)	
2008	Kalen DeBoer (2)	Sioux Falls	
2009	Kalen DeBoer (3)	Sioux Falls	
2010	Mike Van Diest (4)	Carroll (MT)	
2011	Mike Feminis	Saint Xavier (IL)	
2012	Steve Ryan	Morningside	
2013	Mike Woodley	Grand View	
2014	Mark Henninger	Marian	
2015	Mark Henninger (2)	Marian	
2016	Kevin Donley (3)	Saint Francis (IN)	
2017	Kevin Donley (4)	Saint Francis (IN)	
2018	Steve Ryan (2)	Morningside	
2019	Steve Ryan (3)	Morningside	
2020–21	Chris Oliver	Lindsey Wilson	
2021	Steve Ryan (4)	Morningside	
2022	Matt McCarty	Northwestern (IA)	
2023	Doug Socha	Keiser	
2024	Myles Russ	Keiser	
2025	Joel Osborn	Benedictine (KS)	

== Coaches with multiple wins ==
Coach	School	Total	Winning years
Gil Steinke	Texas A&I; (Texas A&M–Kingsville)	4	1970, 1974, 1975, 1976
Mike Van Diest	Carroll (MT)	4	2003, 2005, 2007, 2010
Kevin Donley	Georgetown (KY); Saint Francis (IN)	4	1991, 2004, 2016, 2017
Steve Ryan	Morningside	4	2012, 2018, 2019, 2021
Ad Rutschman	Linfield	3	1982, 1984, 1986
Dick Strahm	Findlay	3	1992, 1995, 1997
Kalen DeBoer	Sioux Falls	3	2006, 2008, 2009
Larry Korver	Northwestern (IA)	2	1973, 1985
Dennis Franchione	Pittsburg State	2	1986, 1987
Joe Fusco	Westminster (PA)	2	1988, 1989
Frosty Westering	Pacific Lutheran	2	1983, 1993
Bill Cronin	Georgetown (KY)	2	2000, 2001
Mark Henninger	Marian (IN)	2	2014, 2015

== Schools with multiple wins ==
School	Total	Winning years
Texas A&I; (Texas A&M–Kingsville)	5	1970, 1974, 1975, 1976, 1979
Morningside (IA)	5	1956, 2012, 2018, 2019, 2021
Linfield	4	1962, 1982, 1984, 1986
Pittsburg State	4	1961, 1981, 1986, 1987
Findlay	4	1979, 1992, 1995, 1997
Sioux Falls	4	1996, 2006, 2008, 2009
Carroll (MT)	4	2003, 2005, 2007, 2010
Westminster (PA)	3	1988, 1989, 1994
Georgetown (KY)	3	1991, 2000, 2001
Northwestern (IA)	3	1973, 1985, 2022
Hillsdale	2	1957, 1982
Concordia–Moorhead	2	1964, 1982
Central Arkansas	2	1983, 1990
Pacific Lutheran	2	1983, 1993
Central State (OH)	2	1992, 1995
Marian (IN)	2	2014, 2015
Saint Francis (IN)	2	2004, 2016
Keiser	2	2023, 2024
