= 1973 Carroll Fighting Saints football team =

American college football season

1973 Carroll Fighting Saints football

Frontier champion
- Conference: Frontier Conference
- Record: 7–0 (4–0 Frontier)
- Head coach: Bob Petrino Sr. (3rd season)
- Captains: Jim Kelly; Dick Canty; Dan Rambo; Armando Barragan
- Home stadium: Vigilante Stadium

1973 Frontier Conference football standings
	Conf.					Overall
Team	W		L		T	W		L		T
No. 8 Carroll (MT) $	4	–	0	–	0	7	–	0	–	0
Montana Tech	2	–	2	–	0	6	–	2	–	0
Eastern Montana	2	–	2	–	0	3	–	5	–	0
Rocky Mountain	1	–	3	–	0	2	–	6	–	0
Western Montana	1	–	3	–	0	1	–	6	–	0
$ – Conference champion; Rankings from NAIA Division II poll

The 1973 Carroll Fighting Saints football team represented Carroll College as a member of the Frontier Conference during the 1973 NAIA Division II football season. In their third season under head coach Bob Petrino Sr., the Fighting Saints compiled a 7–0 record (4–0 against conference opponents), outscored opponents by a total of 186 to 93, and won the Frontier Conference championship. The team was ranked No. 8 in the final NAIA Division II poll.

The 1973 season was the second perfect season in Carroll College football history, a feat also accomplished by the 1931, 2003, 2005, and 2007 teams.

== Schedule ==
Date	Opponent	Site	Result	Source
September 8	Ricks*	Vigilante Stadium; Helena, MT	W 26–6	
September 15	at Minot State*	Minot, ND	W 13–6	
September 29	at Eastern Montana	Billings, MT	W 20–19	
October 6	Rocky Mountain	Vigilante Stadium; Helena, MT	W 48–35	
October 13	Dickinson State*	Vigilante Stadium; Helena, MT	W 12–7	
October 20	at Montana Tech	Butte, MT	W 28–14	
October 27	Western Montana	Vigilante Stadium; Helena, MT	W 39–6	
*Non-conference game

== Players ==
Eleven Carroll players were selected as first-team players on the 1973 all-Frontier Conference football team. The honorees were:

- Mike Malloch, center, junior, 6'4", 245 pounds
- Armando Barragan, guard, junior, 6'3", 230 pounds
- Ed Robinson, offensive tackle, junior, 6'3", 235 pounds
- Dan English, tight end, junior, 6'1", 220 pounds
- Dan Rambo, running back, junior, 5'10", 200 pounds
- Walt Chancy, wide receiver, junior, 6'3", 185 pounds
- Randy Triplett, defensive tackle, junior, 5'11" 200 pounds
- Dick Canty, defensive end, senior, 6'4" 225 pounds
- Jim Kelly, linebacker, senior, 5'9", 196 pounds
- Rich McElmurry, defensive back, junior, 5'9", 196 pounds
- Bob Applegate, defensive back, senior, 5'10", 190 pounds

The team had four captains: senior linebacker Jim Kelly; senior defensive end Dick Canty; junior running back Dan Rambo; and junior guard Armando Barragan.
