= Tom Rethman =

American football player and coach

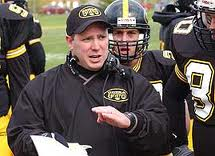

Current position
- Title: Offensive coordinator & quarterbacks coach
- Team: Buena Vista
- Conference: ARC

Playing career
- 1988–1991: Knox (IL)
- Position: Defensive back

Coaching career (HC unless noted)
- 1992: Knox (IL) (WR/TE)
- c. 1993: Southern Illinois (GA)
- c. 1995: Illinois State (assistant)
- 1996–1999: Knox (IL) (OC)
- 1999–2000: Carroll (WI) (OC)
- 2001–2007: Wisconsin–Oshkosh (OC)
- 2008–2016: Briar Cliff
- 2022–2023: Buena Vista (RB)
- 2024–present: Buena Vista (OC/QB)

Head coaching record
- Overall: 21–78

Tom Rethman is an American college football coach. He is the offensive coordinator and quarterbacks coach for Buena Vista University, positions he has held since 2024. He served as the head football coach at Briar Cliff University from 2008 to 2016, compiling a record of 21–78. He was the second head coach in the history of the Briar Cliff Chargers football program, succeeding Dick Strittmatter. A native of El Dorado, Kansas, Rethman graduated from Knox College in Galesburg, Illinois in 1992.

== Head coaching record ==
Year	Team	Overall	Conference	Standing	Bowl/playoffs
Briar Cliff Chargers (Great Plains Athletic Conference) (2008–2016)
2008	Briar Cliff	2–9	2–8	T–9th	
2009	Briar Cliff	4–7	4–6	T–7th	
2010	Briar Cliff	2–9	1–9	10th	
2011	Briar Cliff	2–9	1–8	9th	
2012	Briar Cliff	1–10	1–8	9th	
2013	Briar Cliff	4–7	3–6	T–7th	
2014	Briar Cliff	2–9	2–7	8th	
2015	Briar Cliff	3–8	2–7	8th	
2016	Briar Cliff	1–10	0–8	9th	
Briar Cliff:		21–78	16–67		
Total:		21–78			
