= 2004 Saint Francis Cougars football team =

American college football season

2004 Saint Francis Cougars football

NAIA national runner-up MSFA (MEL) champion
- Conference: Mid-States Football Association
- Mideast League
- Record: 13–1 (7–0 MSFA (MEL))
- Head coach: Kevin Donley (7th season)
- Offensive coordinator: Patrick Donley (1st season)
- Home stadium: Bishop John M. D'Arcy Stadium

2004 Mid-States Football Association standings
	Conf.			Overall
Team	W		L	W		L
Mideast League
No. 2 St. Francis (IN) x^	7	–	0	13	–	1
No. 21 Walsh	6	–	1	8	–	3
Urbana	5	–	2	5	–	6
Geneva	4	–	3	5	–	5
Malone	2	–	5	4	–	6
Quincy	2	–	5	4	–	7
Taylor	2	–	5	2	–	8
Ohio Dominican	0	–	7	0	–	10
Midwest League
No. 12 McKendree x^	7	–	0	9	–	2
No. 14 Trinity International ^	5	–	2	8	–	3
No. 22 Saint Xavier	5	–	2	7	–	4
No. 19 St. Ambrose	4	–	3	7	–	3
Olivet Nazarene	4	–	3	7	–	5
William Penn	2	–	5	3	–	8
Iowa Wesleyan	1	–	6	2	–	9
St. Francis (IL)	0	–	7	1	–	10
x – League champion/co-champions ^ – NAIA playoff participant; Rankings from NAIA Coaches' Poll

The 2004 Saint Francis Cougars football team represented the University of Saint Francis, located in Fort Wayne, Indiana, in the 2004 NAIA football season. They were led by head coach Kevin Donley, who served his 7th year as the first and only head coach in the history of Saint Francis football. The Cougars played their home games at Bishop John M. D'Arcy Stadium and were members of the Mid-States Football Association (MSFA) Mideast League (MEL). The Cougars finished in 1st place in the MSFA MEL division, and they received an automatic bid to the 2004 postseason NAIA playoffs.

The 2004 Cougars finished the regular season undefeated. In the postseason playoffs, the Cougars advanced to the national championship game where they lost to the Fighting Saints of Carroll, 15–13 in double overtime.

== Schedule ==
(13–1 overall, 7–0 conference)
The 2004 season was the first of three consecutive trips to the NAIA championship game in Savannah, TN. The Cougars finished as runner-up in the nation with its 2-point loss to Carroll (MT). As a tribute to this team's success, Donley was named the NAIA National Coach of the Year for the second time.

Date	Opponent	Rank	Site	Result	Attendance
September 11	Ohio Dominican	No. 4	Bishop D'Arcy Stadium; Fort Wayne, IN	W 55–3	4,000
September 18	at No. 10 McKendree*	No. 4	Lebanon, IL	W 33–10	1,800
September 25	Iowa Wesleyan*	No. 3	Bishop D'Arcy Stadium; Fort Wayne, IN	W 62–8	3,500
October 2	at Geneva	No. 3	Reeves Field; Beaver Falls, PA	W 30–24	6,455
October 9	Butler*	No. 3	Bishop D'Arcy Stadium; Fort Wayne, IN	W 35–7	5,000
October 16	Urbana	No. 2	Bishop D'Arcy Stadium; Fort Wayne, IN	W 37–20	3,500
October 23	at Taylor	No. 2	Jim Wheeler Memorial Stadium; Upland, IN	W 46–0	NA
October 30	Malone	No. 2	Bishop D'Arcy Stadium; Fort Wayne, IN	W 40–6	4,000
November 6	at Quincy	No. 2	QU Stadium; Quincy, IL	W 49–13	761
November 13	No. 15 Walsh	No. 2	Bishop D'Arcy Stadium; Fort Wayne, IN	W 42–14	5,000
November 20	No. 12 Morningside*	No. 2	Bishop D'Arcy Stadium; Fort Wayne, IN (NAIA First Round)	W 53–3	
November 27	No. 16 Hastings*	No. 2	Bishop D'Arcy Stadium; Fort Wayne, IN (NAIA Quarterfinal)	W 48–17	
December 4	No. 3 Georgetown*	No. 2	Bishop D'Arcy Stadium; Fort Wayne, IN (NAIA Semifinal)	W 12–7	2,700
December 18	vs. No. 1 Carroll*	No. 2	Jim Carroll Stadium; Savannah, TN (NAIA Championship)	L 13–15	5,276
*Non-conference game; Rankings from Coaches' Poll released prior to the game

== National awards and honors ==
- Senior running back Cory Jacquay was named as the 2004 NAIA Football Player of the Year. This was the first time in Cougar football history that one of their players received the award.

== Ranking movements ==
Ranking movements Legend: ██ Increase in ranking ██ Decrease in ranking
	Week											
Poll	Pre	1	2	3	4	5	6	7	8	9	10	Final
NAIA Coaches' Poll	4	4	3	3	3	2	2	2	2	2	2	2
