= DeGraffenreid =

DeGraffenreid is a surname. Notable people with the surname include:

- Allen DeGraffenreid (wide receiver) (born 1970), American football player
- Allen DeGraffenreid (offensive lineman) (born 1974), American football player
- Emma DeGraffenreid, plaintiff of a 1976 employment discrimination lawsuit cited in the development of the theory of intersectionality
- Gordon DeGraffenreid, American football coach
- James DeGraffenreid, Nevada Republican Party Executive Board member and defendant in State of Nevada v. Michael J. McDonald, et al.
- Kenneth E. deGraffenreid, American university professor
- Reese C. De Graffenreid (1859–1902), American politician from Texas
- Veronica Degraffenreid, Secretary of the Commonwealth of Pennsylvania beginning in 2021
