= Dick Strittmatter =

American football coach

Biographical details
- Born: 07/10/1949; Atlantic, Iowa, U.S.
- Education: Western Illinois

Coaching career (HC unless noted)
- 1974–1975: Gibbs HS (FL)
- 1976–1986: Dexfield High School (Redfield, Iowa)
- 1987–1994: Auburn High School Nebraska
- 1995–2001: Peru State
- 2002–2007: Briar Cliff
- 2010: Atlantic HS (IA) (assistant)

Head coaching record
- Overall: 49–70–1 (college); 153–112 (high school)

Dick Strittmatter is an American former football coach. He served as the head football coach at Peru State College from 1995 to 2000 and at Briar Cliff College from 2002 to 2007, compiling a career college football record of 49–70.

== Coaching career ==
Strittmatter was the first head football coach at Briar Cliff College in Sioux City, Iowa and he held that position for six seasons, from 2002 until 2007. His coaching record at Briar Cliff was 18–44.

== Head coaching record ==
=== College ===
Year	Team	Overall	Conference	Standing	Bowl/playoffs	NAIA^{#}
Peru State Bobcats (NAIA Division II independent) (1995–2000)
1995	Peru State	3–5–1				
1996	Peru State	7–3				
1997	Peru State	6–4				
1998	Peru State	4–5				
1999	Peru State	3–7				
Peru State Bobcats (Central States Football League) (2000)
2000	Peru State	8–2	4–1	2nd		20
Peru State:		31–26–1	4–1			
Briar Cliff Chargers (NAIA independent) (2002)
2002	Briar Cliff	6–3				
Briar Cliff Chargers (Great Plains Athletic Conference) (2003–2007)
2003	Briar Cliff	0–10	0–10	11th		
2004	Briar Cliff	3–7	3–7	8th		
2005	Briar Cliff	4–7	3–7	9th		
2006	Briar Cliff	5–6	4–6	T–6th		
2007	Briar Cliff	0–11	0–10	10th		
Briar Cliff:		18–44	10–40			
Total:		49–70–1				
