= 2010 NAIA football rankings =

Legend
	Increase in ranking
	Decrease in ranking
	Not ranked previous week
*	NAIA National Champion
т	Tied with team above or below also with this symbol

One human poll made up the 2010 National Association of Intercollegiate Athletics (NAIA) football rankings, sometimes called the NAIA Coaches' Poll or the football ratings. Once the regular season was complete, the NAIA sponsored a 16-team playoff to determine the year's national champion. A final poll was then taken after completion of the 2010 NAIA Football National Championship.

== Poll release dates ==
The poll release dates were:

- April 19, 2010 (Spring)
- August 9, 2010 (Preseason)
- September 13, 2010
- September 20, 2010
- September 27, 2010
- October 4, 2010
- October 11, 2010
- October 18, 2010
- October 25, 2010
- November 1, 2010
- November 8, 2010
- November 14, 2010 (Final)
- January 10, 2011 (Postseason)

== Week by week poll ==
	Week 0-Spring Apr 19	Week 0-Preseason Aug 09	Week Poll 1 Sep 13	Week Poll 2 Sep 20	Week Poll 3 Sep 27	Week Poll 4 Oct 04	Week Poll 5 Oct 11	Week Poll 6 Oct 18	Week Poll 7 Oct 25	Week Poll 8 Nov 01	Week Poll 9 Nov 08	Week Final Nov 14	Week Postseason Jan 10	
1.	Sioux Falls (SD)	Sioux Falls (SD)	Sioux Falls (SD)	Sioux Falls (SD)	Sioux Falls (SD)	Sioux Falls (SD)	Sioux Falls (SD)	Sioux Falls (SD)	Sioux Falls (SD)	Sioux Falls (SD)	Sioux Falls (SD)	Sioux Falls (SD)	*Carroll (MT)	1.
2.	Lindenwood (MO)	Lindenwood (MO)	Lindenwood (MO)	Lindenwood (MO)	Carroll (MT)	Carroll (MT)	Carroll (MT)	Carroll (MT)	Carroll (MT)	Carroll (MT)	Carroll (MT)	Carroll (MT)	Sioux Falls (SD)	2.
3.	Carroll (MT)	Carroll (MT)	Carroll (MT)	Carroll (MT)	Saint Xavier (IL)	Saint Xavier (IL)	Saint Xavier (IL)	Saint Xavier (IL)	Saint Xavier (IL)	Saint Xavier (IL)	Saint Xavier (IL)	Saint Xavier (IL)	Saint Xavier (IL)	3.
4.	Saint Xavier (IL)	Saint Xavier (IL)	Saint Xavier (IL)	Saint Xavier (IL)	Morningside (IA)	Morningside (IA)	Morningside (IA)	MidAmerica Nazarene (KS)	MidAmerica Nazarene (KS)	MidAmerica Nazarene (KS)	MidAmerica Nazarene (KS)	MidAmerica Nazarene (KS)	MidAmerica Nazarene (KS)	4.
5.	Morningside (IA)	Morningside (IA)	Morningside (IA)	Morningside (IA)	MidAmerica Nazarene (KS)	MidAmerica Nazarene (KS)	MidAmerica Nazarene (KS)	Lindenwood (MO)	Lindenwood (MO)	Lindenwood (MO)	Lindenwood (MO)	Lindenwood (MO)	Saint Francis (IN)	5.
6.	(T) Lambuth (TN)	MidAmerica Nazarene (KS)	MidAmerica Nazarene (KS)	MidAmerica Nazarene (KS)	Lindenwood (MO)	Lindenwood (MO)	Lindenwood (MO)	McPherson (KS)	McPherson (KS)	McPherson (KS)	McPherson (KS)	McPherson (KS)	Morningside (IA)	6.
7.	(T) MidAmerica Nazarene (KS)	Lambuth (TN)	Ottawa (KS)	McPherson (KS)	McPherson (KS)	McPherson (KS)	McPherson (KS)	Saint Francis (IN)	Saint Francis (IN)	Saint Francis (IN)	Morningside (IA)	Morningside (IA)	Marian (IN)	7.
8.	Ottawa (KS)	McKendree (IL)	Missouri Valley	Walsh (OH)	Walsh (OH)	Walsh (OH)	Saint Francis (IN)	Morningside (IA)	Morningside (IA)	Morningside (IA)	Ottawa (KS)	Ottawa (KS)	McKendree (IL)	8.
9.	McKendree (IL)	Ottawa (KS)	McPherson (KS)	Saint Francis (IN)	Saint Francis (IN)	Saint Francis (IN)	Dickinson State (SD)	Missouri Valley	Missouri Valley	Missouri Valley	Dickinson State (SD)	Dickinson State (SD)	Lindenwood (MO)	9.
10.	Missouri Valley	Missouri Valley	Walsh (OH)	Lambuth (TN)	Dickinson State (SD)	Dickinson State (SD)	Missouri Valley	Ottawa (KS)	Ottawa (KS)	Ottawa (KS)	Saint Francis (IN)	Saint Francis (IN)	Dickinson State (SD)	10.
11.	Cumberlands (KY)	Cumberlands (KY)	(T) Lambuth (TN)	Dickinson State (SD)	Missouri Valley	Missouri Valley	Ottawa (KS)	William Penn (IA)	Dickinson State (SD)	Dickinson State (SD)	Marian (IN)	Marian (IN)	McPherson (KS)	11.
12.	McPherson (KS)	McPherson (KS)	(T) Saint Francis (IN)	Missouri Valley	McKendree (IL)	McKendree (IL)	William Penn (IA)	South Dakota M&T	Marian (IN)	Marian (IN)	McKendree (IL)	McKendree (IL)	William Penn (IA)	12.
13.	Hastings (NB)	Hastings (NB)	Dickinson State (SD)	Marian (IN)	Ottawa (KS)	Ottawa (KS)	Walsh (OH)	Dickinson State (SD)	McKendree (IL)	McKendree (IL)	William Penn (IA)	William Penn (IA)	Ottawa (KS)	13.
14.	Minot State (ND)	Minot State (ND)	McKendree (IL)	McKendree (IL)	Azusa Pacific (CA)	Marian (IN)	Kansas Wesleyan	Marian (IN)	Northwestern (IA)	William Penn (IA)	Missouri Valley	Missouri Valley	Georgetown (KY)	14.
15.	Friends (KS)	Friends (KS)	Marian (IN)	Ottawa (KS)	Marian (IN)	William Penn (IA)	South Dakota M&T	Northwestern (IA)	William Penn (IA)	Northwestern (IA)	Northwestern (IA)	Northwestern (IA)	(T) Northwestern Oklahoma State	15.
16.	Walsh (OH)	Walsh (OH)	Cumberlands (KY)	Benedictine (KS)	William Penn (IA)	Langston (OK)	Cumberland (TN)	McKendree (IL)	Walsh (OH)	South Dakota M&T	Northwestern Oklahoma State	Northwestern Oklahoma State	(T) Azusa Pacific (CA)	16.
17.	Saint Francis (IN)	Saint Francis (IN)	(T) Benedictine (KS)	Azusa Pacific (CA)	Northwestern (IA)	Kansas Wesleyan	Northwestern (IA)	Webber International (FL)	Northwestern Oklahoma State	Northwestern Oklahoma State	Cumberland (TN)	Georgetown (KY)	Missouri Valley	17.
18.	Dickinson State (SD)	Dickinson State (SD)	(T) St. Ambrose (IA)	Northwestern (IA)	Langston (OK)	South Dakota M&T	Marian (IN)	Kansas Wesleyan	South Dakota M&T	Cumberland (TN)	Georgetown (KY)	Azusa Pacific (CA)	Northwestern (IA)	18.
19.	Langston (OK)	Langston (OK)	Azusa Pacific (CA)	William Penn (IA)	Lambuth (TN)	Azusa Pacific (CA)	McKendree (IL)	Walsh (OH)	Friends (KS)	Georgetown (KY)	Midland (NB)	South Dakota M&T	Cumberlands (KY)	19.
20.	Grand View (IA)	Grand View (IA)	William Penn (IA)	Langston (OK)	Benedictine (KS)	Northwestern (IA)	Benedictine (KS)	Black Hills State (SD)	Cumberland (TN)	Midland (NB)	Walsh (OH)	Cumberlands (KY)	South Dakota M&T	20.
21.	Eastern Oregon	Eastern Oregon	Northwestern (IA)	Montana Tech	Dakota Wesleyan (SD)	Cumberland (TN)	(T) Montana Tech	Langston (OK)	Georgetown (KY)	Walsh (OH)	(T) Azusa Pacific (CA)	Kansas Wesleyan	Midland (NB)	21.
22.	Taylor (IN)	Taylor (IN)	Langston (OK)	Hastings (NB)	Kansas Wesleyan	Montana Tech	(T) Webber International (FL)	Friends (KS)	Webber International (FL)	Azusa Pacific (CA)	(T) St. Francis (IL)	Midland (NB)	Kansas Wesleyan	22.
23.	Northwestern (IA)	Northwestern (IA)	Hastings (NB)	St. Ambrose (IA)	South Dakota M&T	Benedictine (KS)	Langston (OK)	Northwestern Oklahoma State	Kansas Wesleyan	St. Francis (IL)	Langston (OK)	Cumberland (TN)	Cumberland (TN)	23.
24.	Baker (KS)	Baker (KS)	Southern Oregon	Southern Nazarene (OK)	Menlo (CA)	Webber International (FL)	Azusa Pacific (CA)	Azusa Pacific (CA)	Black Hills State (SD)	Langston (OK)	South Dakota M&T	Southern Nazarene (OK)	Southern Nazarene (OK)	24.
25.	Northwestern Oklahoma State	Northwestern Oklahoma State	Montana Tech	Sterling (KS)	Cumberland (TN)	(T) Dakota Wesleyan (SD); (T) Campbellsville (KY); (T) Hastings (NB)	Friends (KS)	Cumberland (TN)	Midland (NB)	Friends (KS)	Kansas Wesleyan	Webber International (FL)	Webber International (FL)	25.
	Week 0-Spring Apr 19	Week 0-Preseason Aug 09	Week Poll 1 Sep 13	Week Poll 2 Sep 20	Week Poll 3 Sep 27	Week Poll 4 Oct 04	Week Poll 5 Oct 11	Week Poll 6 Oct 18	Week Poll 7 Oct 25	Week Poll 8 Nov 01	Week Poll 9 Nov 08	Week Final Nov 14	Week Postseason Jan 10	
		None	Dropped: Baker (KS); Eastern Oregon; Friends (KS); Grand View (IA); Minot State (ND); Northwestern Oklahoma State; Taylor (IN)	Dropped: Cumberlands (KY); Southern Oregon	Dropped: Hastings (NB); Montana Tech; St. Ambrose (IA); Southern Nazarene (OK); Sterling (KS)	Dropped: Lambuth (TN); Menlo (CA)	Dropped: Campbellsville (KY); Dakota Wesleyan (SD); Hastings (NB)	Dropped: Benedictine (KS); Montana Tech	Dropped: Azusa Pacific (CA); Langston (OK)	Dropped: Black Hills State (SD); Kansas Wesleyan; Webber International (FL)	Dropped: Friends (KS)	Dropped: Langston (OK); St. Francis (IL); Walsh (OH)	None	

== Leading vote-getters ==
Since the inception of the Coaches' Poll in 1999, the #1 ranking in the various weekly polls has been held by only a select group of teams. Through the postseason poll of the 2010 season, the teams and the number of times they have held the #1 weekly ranking are shown below. The number of times a team has been ranked #1 in the postseason poll (the national champion) is shown in parentheses.

In 1999, the results of a postseason poll, if one was conducted, are not known. Therefore, an additional poll has been presumed, and the #1 postseason ranking has been credited to the postseason tournament champion, the Northwestern Oklahoma State Rangers.

Team	Total #1 Rankings
Sioux Falls (SD)	55 (3)
Carroll (MT)	54 (6)
Georgetown (KY)	23 (2)
Northwestern Oklahoma State	12 (1)
Azusa Pacific (CA)	3
Saint Francis (IN)	3
