= Poelker =

Poelker is a surname. Notable people with the surname include:

- Carl Poelker (1944–2026), American football, wrestling, and track and field coach
- John Poelker (1913–1990), American mayor
