= 2005 Saint Francis Cougars football team =

American college football season

2005 Saint Francis Cougars football

NAIA national runner-up MSFA (MEL) champion
- Conference: Mid-States Football Association
- Mideast League
- Record: 13–1 (7–0 MSFA (MEL))
- Head coach: Kevin Donley (8th season)
- Offensive coordinator: Patrick Donley (2nd season)
- Home stadium: Bishop John M. D'Arcy Stadium

2005 Mid-States Football Association standings
	Conf.			Overall
Team	W		L	W		L
Mideast League
No. 2 St. Francis (IN) x^	7	–	0	13	–	1
No. 18 Walsh	5	–	2	8	–	3
No. 14 Geneva ^	5	–	2	8	–	4
Quincy	4	–	3	5	–	6
Urbana	3	–	4	6	–	5
Malone	2	–	5	3	–	7
Ohio Dominican	2	–	5	3	–	7
Taylor	0	–	7	0	–	10
Midwest League
No. 9 Saint Xavier x^	6	–	1	9	–	3
No. 10 McKendree x^	6	–	1	8	–	3
No. 16 St. Ambrose ^	5	–	2	8	–	3
William Penn	4	–	3	6	–	5
Olivet Nazarene	3	–	4	6	–	6
Trinity International	2	–	5	3	–	7
Iowa Wesleyan	2	–	5	3	–	8
St. Francis (IL)	0	–	7	2	–	9
x – League champion/co-champions ^ – NAIA playoff participant; Rankings from NAIA Coaches' Poll

The 2005 Saint Francis Cougars football team represented the University of Saint Francis, located in Fort Wayne, Indiana, in the 2005 NAIA football season. They were led by head coach Kevin Donley, who served his 8th year as the first and only head coach in the history of Saint Francis football. The Cougars played their home games at Bishop John M. D'Arcy Stadium and were members of the Mid-States Football Association (MSFA) Mideast League (MEL). The Cougars finished in 1st place in the MSFA MEL division, and they received an automatic bid to the 2005 postseason NAIA playoffs.

The 2005 Cougars finished the regular season undefeated. In the postseason playoffs, the Cougars advanced to the national championship game where they lost to the Fighting Saints of Carroll, 27–10.

== Schedule ==
(13–1 overall, 7–0 conference)
The 2005 season saw a rematch of the 2004 NAIA championship game. Once again, the Cougars finished as runner-up to Carroll (MT). For the three seasons 2003–2005, the USF record was 38–3, with all 3 losses coming as season-ending losses to Carroll (MT).

Date	Time	Opponent	Rank	Site	Result	Attendance
September 10		at Indiana State*	No. 2	Memorial Stadium; Terre Haute, IN	W 42–10	3,160
September 17		No. 6 McKendree*	No. 2	Bishop D'Arcy Stadium; Fort Wayne, IN	W 28–21	4,000
September 24		Wisconsin – Eau Claire*	No. 2	Bishop D'Arcy Stadium; Fort Wayne, IN	W 35–10	3,000
October 1		No. 19 Geneva	No. 2	Bishop D'Arcy Stadium; Fort Wayne, IN	W 50–22	3,700
October 8		at Ohio Dominican	No. 2	Panther Field; Columbus, OH	W 49–7	1,277
October 15		at No. 16 Urbana	No. 2	Wood Street Stadium; Urbana, OH	W 35–3	4,000
October 22		Taylor	No. 2	Bishop D'Arcy Stadium; Fort Wayne, IN	W 55–0	3,900
October 29		at Malone	No. 2	Fawcett Stadium; Canton, OH	W 28–7	2,000
November 5		Quincy	No. 2	Bishop D'Arcy Stadium; Fort Wayne, IN	W 53–19	3,000
November 12		at No. 11 Walsh	No. 2	Fawcett Stadium; Canton, OH	W 21–7	2,493
November 19		No. 13 Pikeville*	No. 2	Bishop D'Arcy Stadium; Fort Wayne, IN (NAIA First Round)	W 41–7	3,500
November 26		No. 5 Georgetown*	No. 2	Bishop D'Arcy Stadium; Fort Wayne, IN (NAIA Quarterfinal)	W 44–14	2,000
December 3		No. 3 Morningside*	No. 2	Bishop D'Arcy Stadium; Fort Wayne, IN (NAIA Semifinal)	W 42–14	3,300
December 17	1:05pm (FW time)	vs. No. 1 Carroll*	No. 2	Jim Carroll Stadium; Savannah, TN (NAIA Championship)	L 10–27	6,313
*Non-conference game; Rankings from Coaches' Poll released prior to the game; All times are in Eastern time

== Ranking movements ==
Ranking movements
	Week											
Poll	Pre	1	2	3	4	5	6	7	8	9	10	Final
NAIA Coaches' Poll	2	2	2	2	2	2	2	2	2	2	2	2
