= 2005 NAIA football rankings =

Legend
	Increase in ranking
	Decrease in ranking
	Not ranked previous week
*	NAIA National Champion
т	Tied with team above or below also with this symbol

One human poll made up the 2005 National Association of Intercollegiate Athletics (NAIA) football rankings, sometimes called the NAIA Coaches' Poll or the football ratings. Once the regular season was complete, the NAIA sponsored a playoff to determine the year's national champion. A final poll was then taken after completion of the 2005 NAIA Football National Championship.

== Poll release dates ==
The poll release dates were:

- August 16, 2005 (Preseason)
- September 12, 2005
- September 19, 2005
- September 26, 2005
- October 3, 2005
- October 10, 2005
- October 17, 2005
- October 24, 2005
- October 31, 2005
- November 7, 2005
- November 14, 2005 (Final)
- January 18, 2006 (Postseason)

== Week by week poll ==
	Week 0-Preseason Aug 16	Week Poll 1 Sep 12	Week Poll 2 Sep 19	Week Poll 3 Sep 26	Week Poll 4 Oct 03	Week Poll 5 Oct 10	Week Poll 6 Oct 17	Week Poll 7 Oct 24	Week Poll 8 Oct 31	Week Poll 9 Nov 07	Week Final Nov 14	Week Postseason Jan 18	
1.	Carroll (MT)	Carroll (MT)	Carroll (MT)	Carroll (MT)	Carroll (MT)	Carroll (MT)	Carroll (MT)	Carroll (MT)	Carroll (MT)	Carroll (MT)	Carroll (MT)	*Carroll (MT)	1.
2.	Saint Francis (IN)	Saint Francis (IN)	Saint Francis (IN)	Saint Francis (IN)	Saint Francis (IN)	Saint Francis (IN)	Saint Francis (IN)	Saint Francis (IN)	Saint Francis (IN)	Saint Francis (IN)	Saint Francis (IN)	Saint Francis (IN)	2.
3.	Georgetown (KY)	Sioux Falls (SD)	Sioux Falls (SD)	Sioux Falls (SD)	Sioux Falls (SD)	Sioux Falls (SD)	Morningside (IA)	Morningside (IA)	Morningside (IA)	Morningside (IA)	Morningside (IA)	Morningside (IA)	3.
4.	Azusa Pacific (CA)	Georgetown (KY)	MidAmerica Nazarene (KS)	Morningside (IA)	Morningside (IA)	Morningside (IA)	(T) Sioux Falls (SD)	Sioux Falls (SD)	Sioux Falls (SD)	Sioux Falls (SD)	Sioux Falls (SD)	Sioux Falls (SD)	4.
5.	Sioux Falls (SD)	MidAmerica Nazarene (KS)	Georgetown (KY)	McKendree (IL)	McKendree (IL)	Saint Xavier (IL)	(T) St. Ambrose (IA)	MidAmerica Nazarene (KS)	Cumberlands (KY)	Georgetown (KY)	Georgetown (KY)	Georgetown (KY)	5.
6.	Dickinson State (SD)	McKendree (IL)	Morningside (IA)	Saint Xavier (IL)	Saint Xavier (IL)	MidAmerica Nazarene (KS)	MidAmerica Nazarene (KS)	Cumberlands (KY)	Georgetown (KY)	Tabor (KS)	Tabor (KS)	Tabor (KS)	6.
7.	Lindenwood (MO)	Morningside (IA)	Montana Tech	St. Ambrose (IA)	(T) St. Ambrose (IA)	St. Ambrose (IA)	Pikeville (KY)	Georgetown (KY)	Tabor (KS)	Saint Xavier (IL)	Saint Xavier (IL)	Montana Tech	7.
8.	Northwestern Oklahoma State	Montana Tech	Graceland (IA)	MidAmerica Nazarene (KS)	(T) MidAmerica Nazarene (KS)	Pikeville (KY)	Cumberlands (KY)	Tabor (KS)	Saint Xavier (IL)	McKendree (IL)	McKendree (IL)	Evangel (MO)	8.
9.	McKendree (IL)	Cumberlands (KY)	McKendree (IL)	Pikeville (KY)	Pikeville (KY)	Montana Tech	Georgetown (KY)	Saint Xavier (IL)	St. Ambrose (IA)	MidAmerica Nazarene (KS)	Azusa Pacific (CA)	Saint Xavier (IL)	9.
10.	MidAmerica Nazarene (KS)	Dickinson State (SD)	Saint Xavier (IL)	Montana Tech	Montana Tech	Cumberlands (KY)	Tabor (KS)	St. Ambrose (IA)	McKendree (IL)	Azusa Pacific (CA)	Evangel (MO)	McKendree (IL)	10.
11.	Montana Tech	Graceland (IA)	Geneva (PA)	(T) Cumberlands (KY)	Cumberlands (KY)	Tabor (KS)	Walsh (OH)	McKendree (IL)	Montana Tech	Walsh (OH)	Montana Tech	Dickinson State (SD)	11.
12.	Morningside (IA)	Trinity International (IL)	Pikeville (KY)	(T) Tabor (KS)	Tabor (KS)	Georgetown (KY)	Graceland (IA)	Pikeville (KY)	MidAmerica Nazarene (KS)	Cumberlands (KY)	Graceland (IA)	Azusa Pacific (CA)	12.
13.	Hastings (NB)	Benedictine (KS)	St. Ambrose (IA)	Georgetown (KY)	Graceland (IA)	Graceland (IA)	McKendree (IL)	Montana Tech	Azusa Pacific (CA)	Evangel (MO)	Pikeville (KY)	Graceland (IA)	13.
14.	Cumberlands (KY)	Saint Xavier (IL)	Northwestern Oklahoma State	Northwestern Oklahoma State	Georgetown (KY)	McKendree (IL)	Saint Xavier (IL)	Azusa Pacific (CA)	Walsh (OH)	Pikeville (KY)	St. Ambrose (IA)	Geneva (PA)	14.
15.	Lambuth (TN)	Northwestern Oklahoma State	Nebraska Wesleyan	Graceland (IA)	Walsh (OH)	Walsh (OH)	Valley City State (ND)	Walsh (OH)	Evangel (MO)	Montana Tech	Dickinson State (SD)	Pikeville (KY)	15.
16.	Trinity International (IL)	(T) Pikeville (KY)	Cumberlands (KY)	Azusa Pacific (CA)	Azusa Pacific (CA)	Urbana (OH)	Montana Tech	Webber International (FL)	Pikeville (KY)	Graceland (IA)	Geneva (PA)	St. Ambrose (IA)	16.
17.	Saint Xavier (IL)	(T) Geneva (PA)	Tabor (KS)	Valley City State (ND)	Missouri Valley	Eastern Oregon	Azusa Pacific (CA)	Urbana (OH)	Graceland (IA)	St. Ambrose (IA)	Northwestern (IA)	Northwestern (IA)	17.
18.	Pikeville (KY)	St. Ambrose (IA)	Azusa Pacific (CA)	Walsh (OH)	Urbana (OH)	Valley City State (ND)	Webber International (FL)	Evangel (MO)	Kansas Wesleyan	Valley City State (ND)	Walsh (OH)	Walsh (OH)	18.
19.	Tabor (KS)	Tabor (KS)	Valley City State (ND)	Geneva (PA)	Eastern Oregon	Evangel (MO)	Northwestern Oklahoma State	Kansas Wesleyan	Valley City State (ND)	Dickinson State (SD)	MidAmerica Nazarene (KS)	MidAmerica Nazarene (KS)	19.
20.	Northwestern (IA)	Azusa Pacific (CA)	Walsh (OH)	Missouri Valley	Sterling (KS)	Azusa Pacific (CA)	Urbana (OH)	Graceland (IA)	Dickinson State (SD)	Geneva (PA)	Cumberlands (KY)	Kansas Wesleyan	20.
21.	Walsh (OH)	Hastings (NB)	Dickinson State (SD)	Nebraska Wesleyan	Valley City State (ND)	Northwestern Oklahoma State	Kansas Wesleyan	Valley City State (ND)	Geneva (PA)	Northwestern (IA)	Kansas Wesleyan	Cumberlands (KY)	21.
22.	St. Ambrose (IA)	(T) Nebraska Wesleyan	Virginia-Wise	Benedictine (KS)	Evangel (MO)	Webber International (FL)	Missouri Valley	Dickinson State (SD)	Northwestern (IA)	Webber International (FL)	Valley City State (ND)	Valley City State (ND)	22.
23.	Graceland (IA)	(T) Olivet Nazarene (IL)	Benedictine (KS)	Urbana (OH)	Northwestern Oklahoma State	Black Hills State (SD)	Evangel (MO)	Eastern Oregon	Webber International (FL)	Kansas Wesleyan	Bethel (TN)	Bethel (TN)	23.
24.	Minot State (ND)	Walsh (OH)	Trinity International (IL)	Sterling (KS)	Webber International (FL)	Bacone (OK)	Dickinson State (SD)	Geneva (PA)	Urbana (OH)	Bethel (TN)	Black Hills State (SD)	Black Hills State (SD)	24.
25.	Montana State-Northern	Valley City State (ND)	Sterling (KS)	Eastern Oregon	Geneva (PA)	Kansas Wesleyan	Eastern Oregon	(T) Nebraska Wesleyan; (T) Northwestern (IA)	Benedictine (KS)	Midland Lutheran (NB)	Texas College	Texas College	25.
	Week 0-Preseason Aug 16	Week Poll 1 Sep 12	Week Poll 2 Sep 19	Week Poll 3 Sep 26	Week Poll 4 Oct 03	Week Poll 5 Oct 10	Week Poll 6 Oct 17	Week Poll 7 Oct 24	Week Poll 8 Oct 31	Week Poll 9 Nov 07	Week Final Nov 14	Week Postseason Jan 18	
		Dropped: Lambuth (TN); Lindenwood (MO); Minot State (ND); Montana State-Northern; Northwestern (IA)	Dropped: Hastings (NB); Olivet Nazarene (IL)	Dropped: Dickinson State (SD); Trinity International (IL); Virginia-Wise	Dropped: Benedictine (KS); Nebraska Wesleyan	Dropped: Geneva (PA); Missouri Valley; Sterling (KS)	Dropped: Bacone (OK); Black Hills State (SD)	Dropped: Missouri Valley; Northwestern Oklahoma State	Dropped: Eastern Oregon; Nebraska Wesleyan	Dropped: Benedictine (KS); Urbana (OH)	Dropped: Midland Lutheran (NB); Webber International (FL)	None	

== Leading vote-getters ==
Since the inception of the Coaches' Poll in 1999, the #1 ranking in the various weekly polls has been held by only a select group of teams. Through the postseason poll of the 2005 season, the teams and the number of times they have held the #1 weekly ranking are shown below. The number of times a team has been ranked #1 in the postseason poll (the national champion) is shown in parentheses.

In 1999, the results of a postseason poll, if one was conducted, are not known. Therefore, an additional poll has been presumed, and the #1 postseason ranking has been credited to the postseason tournament champion, the Northwestern Oklahoma State Rangers.

Team	Total #1 Rankings
Carroll (MT)	32 (4)
Georgetown (KY)	23 (2)
Sioux Falls (SD)	16
Northwestern Oklahoma State	12 (1)
Azusa Pacific (CA)	3
