= Ed Simonich =

American football player and coach (1916–1965)

Biographical details
- Born: January 11, 1916; Ironwood, Michigan, U.S.
- Died: August 22, 1965 (aged 49); Butte, Montana, U.S.

Playing career

Football
- 1935–1938: Notre Dame
- Position: Fullback

Coaching career (HC unless noted)

Football
- 1939–1941: Carroll (MT)
- 1945–1946: Butte Central Catholic HS (MT)
- 1947–1949: Trinity HS (IA)
- 1950–1954: Bishop Heelan Catholic HS (IA)
- 1955–1956: Butte Central Catholic HS (MT)
- 1957–1964: Montana Mines

Basketball
- 1939–1944: Carroll (MT)
- 1944–1947: Butte Central Catholic HS (MT)
- 1957–1965: Montana Mines

Track and field
- 1939–1944: Carroll (MT)

Administrative career (AD unless noted)
- 1944–1947: Butte Central Catholic HS (MT)
- 1947–1950: Trinity HS (IA)
- 1950–1955: Bishop Heelan Catholic HS (IA)
- 1957–1965: Montana Mines

Accomplishments and honors

Championships
- Football; 2 MCC (1940–1941); 1 MCC Lower Division (1964) Basketball; 2 MCC (1942–1943) Track and field 2 MCC (1940)

Edward F. "Big Ed" Simonich (January 11, 1916 – August 22, 1965) was an American college football player and coach, college basketball coach, track and field coach, athletics administrator, and educator. He served as the head football coach at Carroll College in Helena, Montana from 1939 to 1941 and the Montana State School of Mines—now known as Montana Technological University—from 1957 to 1964. Simonich played football at the University of Notre Dame under coach Elmer Layden. He was selected in the 19th round of the 1939 NFL draft.

Simonich led the Carroll Fighting Saints football team to consecutive Montana Collegiate Conference (MCC) titles, in 1940 and 1941. He also coached basketball and track at Carroll, leading his track team to a MCC championship in 1940 and his basketball teams to back-to-back MCC titles, in 1942 and 1943. In November 1944, Simonich was hired as the athletic director at Boy's Central High School—now known as Butte Central Catholic High School—in Butte, Montana. In 1947, he left Montana to become the athletic director head football coach at Trinity High School in Sioux City, Iowa.

Three years later, when the all-boys Trinity High School merged with the all-girls Cathedral High School in 1950, he took on the same role at the newly-opened Bishop Heelan Catholic High School. It was Simonich who made the school colors navy and old gold to match his alma mater, Notre Dame, as well as creating the monogram "CH" logo for "Catholic High", the original name of Bishop Heelan Catholic High School. In 1955, he returned to Butte Central Catholic High School as head football coach. In 1957, Simonich was hired as athletic director, coach, and assistant professor at Montana Mines, succeeding Ralph Olsen. At Montana Mines, Simonich also coached basketball, baseball, track, wrestling, ice hockey, tennis, and golf and was director of intramural sports.

Simonich was born on January 11, 1916, in Ironwood, Michigan. He died on August 22, 1965, after suffering from cancer.

== Head coaching record ==
=== College football ===
Year	Team	Overall	Conference	Standing	Bowl/playoffs
Carroll Fighting Saints (Montana Collegiate Conference) (1939–1941)
1939	Carroll	3–4	2–1	2nd	
1940	Carroll	5–2		1st	
1941	Carroll	5–0–1		1st	
Carroll:		13–6–1			
Montana Mines Orediggers (Montana Collegiate Conference) (1957–1964)
1957	Montana Mines	0–6	0–1	5th	
1958	Montana Mines		0–5	6th	
1959	Montana Mines		0–5	6th	
1960	Montana Mines		0–5	6th	
1961	Montana Mines		0–4–1	6th	
1962	Montana Mines		1–4	5th	
1963	Montana Mines		1–4	T–2nd (Lower)	
1964	Montana Mines		2–2–1	1st (Lower)	
Montana Mines:			4–30–2		
Total:					
National championship Conference title Conference division title or championship game berth

=== College basketball ===
Record table
Season	Team	Overall	Conference	Standing	Postseason
Carroll Fighting Saints (Montana Collegiate Conference) (1939–1944)
1939–40	Carroll	8–11	7–8		
1940–41	Carroll	3–14	3–12		
1941–42	Carroll	15–2	13–2	1st	
1942–43	Carroll	9–3	9–3		
1943–44	Carroll	11–2			
Carroll:		46–32	32–25		
Total:					
National champion Postseason invitational champion Conference regular season champion Conference regular season and conference tournament champion Division regular season champion Division regular season and conference tournament champion Conference tournament champion
