= 2004 NAIA football rankings =

Legend
	Increase in ranking
	Decrease in ranking
	Not ranked previous week
*	NAIA National Champion
т	Tied with team above or below also with this symbol

One human poll made up the 2004 National Association of Intercollegiate Athletics (NAIA) football rankings, sometimes called the NAIA Coaches' Poll or the football ratings. Once the regular season was complete, the NAIA sponsored a playoff to determine the year's national champion. A final poll was then taken after completion of the 2004 NAIA Football National Championship.

== Poll release dates ==
The poll release dates were:

- August 17, 2004 (Preseason)
- September 14, 2004
- September 21, 2004
- September 28, 2004
- October 5, 2004
- October 12, 2004
- October 19, 2004
- October 26, 2004
- November 2, 2004
- November 9, 2004
- November 14, 2004 (Final)
- January 17, 2005 (Postseason)

== Week by week poll ==
	Week 0-Preseason Aug 17	Week Poll 1 Sep 14	Week Poll 2 Sep 21	Week Poll 3 Sep 28	Week Poll 4 Oct 05	Week Poll 5 Oct 12	Week Poll 6 Oct 19	Week Poll 7 Oct 26	Week Poll 8 Nov 02	Week Poll 9 Nov 09	Week Final Nov 14	Week Postseason Jan 17	
1.	Carroll (MT)	Carroll (MT)	Carroll (MT)	Carroll (MT)	Carroll (MT)	Sioux Falls (SD)	Sioux Falls (SD)	Sioux Falls (SD)	Sioux Falls (SD)	Sioux Falls (SD)	Sioux Falls (SD)	*Carroll (MT)	1.
2.	Northwestern Oklahoma State	Northwestern Oklahoma State	Sioux Falls (SD)	Sioux Falls (SD)	Sioux Falls (SD)	Saint Francis (IN)	Saint Francis (IN)	Saint Francis (IN)	Saint Francis (IN)	Saint Francis (IN)	Saint Francis (IN)	Saint Francis (IN)	2.
3.	Sioux Falls (SD)	Sioux Falls (SD)	Saint Francis (IN)	Saint Francis (IN)	Saint Francis (IN)	Georgetown (KY)	Georgetown (KY)	Georgetown (KY)	Georgetown (KY)	Georgetown (KY)	Georgetown (KY)	Georgetown (KY)	3.
4.	Saint Francis (IN)	Saint Francis (IN)	Georgetown (KY)	Georgetown (KY)	Georgetown (KY)	St. Ambrose (IA)	St. Ambrose (IA)	Northwestern Oklahoma State	Northwestern Oklahoma State	Northwestern Oklahoma State	Northwestern Oklahoma State	Azusa Pacific (CA)	4.
5.	Dickinson State (SD)	Dickinson State (SD)	Mary (ND)	Mary (ND)	Mary (ND)	Carroll (MT)	Northwestern Oklahoma State	Dickinson State (SD)	Dickinson State (SD)	Dickinson State (SD)	Dickinson State (SD)	Sioux Falls (SD)	5.
6.	MidAmerica Nazarene (KS)	Georgetown (KY)	St. Ambrose (IA)	St. Ambrose (IA)	St. Ambrose (IA)	Northwestern Oklahoma State	Dickinson State (SD)	Azusa Pacific (CA)	Lindenwood (MO)	Lindenwood (MO)	Lindenwood (MO)	Dickinson State (SD)	6.
7.	Georgetown (KY)	St. Ambrose (IA)	Azusa Pacific (CA)	Azusa Pacific (CA)	Northwestern Oklahoma State	Dickinson State (SD)	Azusa Pacific (CA)	Lindenwood (MO)	Mary (ND)	Mary (ND)	Mary (ND)	MidAmerica Nazarene (KS)	7.
8.	St. Ambrose (IA)	Mary (ND)	Northwestern Oklahoma State	Northwestern Oklahoma State	Dickinson State (SD)	Azusa Pacific (CA)	Lindenwood (MO)	Mary (ND)	St. Ambrose (IA)	McKendree (IL)	McKendree (IL)	Hastings (NB)	8.
9.	Northwestern (IA)	Azusa Pacific (CA)	Dickinson State (SD)	Dickinson State (SD)	Azusa Pacific (CA)	Lindenwood (MO)	Mary (ND)	St. Ambrose (IA)	McKendree (IL)	Montana Tech	Carroll (MT)	Northwestern Oklahoma State	9.
10.	Mary (ND)	McKendree (IL)	Walsh (OH)	Northwestern (IA)	Northwestern (IA)	Mary (ND)	McKendree (IL)	McKendree (IL)	Montana Tech	Carroll (MT)	Azusa Pacific (CA)	Mary (ND)	10.
11.	Azusa Pacific (CA)	Walsh (OH)	Northwestern (IA)	Lindenwood (MO)	Lindenwood (MO)	McKendree (IL)	Walsh (OH)	Walsh (OH)	Carroll (MT)	Azusa Pacific (CA)	MidAmerica Nazarene (KS)	Lindenwood (MO)	11.
12.	McKendree (IL)	Lambuth (TN)	MidAmerica Nazarene (KS)	MidAmerica Nazarene (KS)	MidAmerica Nazarene (KS)	Walsh (OH)	Cumberlands (KY)	Carroll (MT)	Tabor (KS)	MidAmerica Nazarene (KS)	Morningside (IA)	McKendree (IL)	12.
13.	Benedictine (KS)	Midland Lutheran (NB)	McKendree (IL)	McKendree (IL)	McKendree (IL)	Cumberlands (KY)	Carroll (MT)	Montana Tech	Morningside (IA)	(T) St. Ambrose (IA)	Montana Tech	Montana Tech	13.
14.	Lambuth (TN)	Northwestern (IA)	Morningside (IA)	Trinity International (IL)	Trinity International (IL)	Northwestern (IA)	Northwestern (IA)	Tabor (KS)	Azusa Pacific (CA)	(T) Trinity International (IL)	Trinity International (IL)	Trinity International (IL)	14.
15.	Walsh (OH)	MidAmerica Nazarene (KS)	Lindenwood (MO)	Walsh (OH)	Walsh (OH)	Tabor (KS)	Montana Tech	Morningside (IA)	MidAmerica Nazarene (KS)	Walsh (OH)	Tabor (KS)	Morningside (IA)	15.
16.	???	Cumberlands (KY)	Cumberlands (KY)	Pikeville (KY)	Pikeville (KY)	Morningside (IA)	Tabor (KS)	MidAmerica Nazarene (KS)	Trinity International (IL)	Cumberlands (KY)	Hastings (NB)	Cumberlands (KY)	16.
17.	Campbellsville (KY)	Montana Western	Southern Oregon	Lambuth (TN)	Cumberlands (KY)	MidAmerica Nazarene (KS)	Morningside (IA)	Trinity International (IL)	Walsh (OH)	Morningside (IA)	Cumberlands (KY)	Northwestern (IA)	17.
18.	Saint Xavier (IL)	Southern Oregon	Lambuth (TN)	Cumberlands (KY)	Midland Lutheran (NB)	Montana Tech	MidAmerica Nazarene (KS)	Pikeville (KY)	Cumberlands (KY)	Hastings (NB)	Northwestern (IA)	Graceland (IA)	18.
19.	McPherson (KS)	Minot State (ND)	Pikeville (KY)	Midland Lutheran (NB)	Morningside (IA)	Trinity International (IL)	Montana Western	Bacone (OK)	Hastings (NB)	Tabor (KS)	Graceland (IA)	(T) Tabor (KS)	19.
20.	Montana Western	Morningside (IA)	Trinity International (IL)	Morningside (IA)	Tabor (KS)	Montana Western	Trinity International (IL)	Cumberlands (KY)	Pikeville (KY)	Northwestern (IA)	St. Ambrose (IA)	(T) St. Ambrose (IA)	20.
21.	Minot State (ND)	(T) Central Methodist (MO)	Campbellsville (KY)	Tabor (KS)	Saint Xavier (IL)	Pikeville (KY)	Pikeville (KY)	Saint Xavier (IL)	Northwestern (IA)	Graceland (IA)	Walsh (OH)	Walsh (OH)	21.
22.	Midland Lutheran (NB)	(T) Lindenwood (MO)	Midland Lutheran (NB)	Hastings (NB)	Belhaven (MS)	Lambuth (TN)	Graceland (IA)	Hastings (NB)	Graceland (IA)	Bacone (OK)	Pikeville (KY)	Saint Xavier (IL)	22.
23.	Geneva (PA)	Campbellsville (KY)	Eastern Oregon	Southern Oregon	Montana Western	Bethel (KS)	Bacone (OK)	Campbellsville (KY)	Bacone (OK)	Saint Xavier (IL)	Saint Xavier (IL)	Pikeville (KY)	23.
24.	Cumberlands (KY)	Trinity International (IL)	Tabor (KS)	Montana Tech	Bethel (TN)	Graceland (IA)	Midland Lutheran (NB)	Northwestern (IA)	Campbellsville (KY)	Pikeville (KY)	Bacone (OK)	Montana Western	24.
25.	Friends (KS)	Friends (KS)	Montana Western	Saint Xavier (IL)	Lambuth (TN)	Bacone (OK)	Campbellsville (KY)	Montana Western	Saint Xavier (IL)	Eastern Oregon	Montana Western	Bacone (OK)	25.
	Week 0-Preseason Aug 17	Week Poll 1 Sep 14	Week Poll 2 Sep 21	Week Poll 3 Sep 28	Week Poll 4 Oct 05	Week Poll 5 Oct 12	Week Poll 6 Oct 19	Week Poll 7 Oct 26	Week Poll 8 Nov 02	Week Poll 9 Nov 09	Week Final Nov 14	Week Postseason Jan 17	
		Dropped: Benedictine (KS); Geneva (PA); McPherson (KS); Saint Xavier (IL)	Dropped: Central Methodist (MO); Friends (KS); Minot State (ND)	Dropped: Campbellsville (KY); Eastern Oregon; Montana Western	Dropped: Hastings (NB); Montana Tech; Southern Oregon	Dropped: Belhaven (MS); Bethel (TN); Midland Lutheran (NB); Saint Xavier (IL)	Dropped: Bethel (KS); Lambuth (TN)	Dropped: Graceland (IA); Midland Lutheran (NB)	Dropped: Montana Western	Dropped: Campbellsville (KY)	Dropped: Eastern Oregon	None	

== Leading vote-getters ==
Since the inception of the Coaches' Poll in 1999, the #1 ranking in the various weekly polls has been held by only a select group of teams. Through the postseason poll of the 2004 season, the teams and the number of times they have held the #1 weekly ranking are shown below. The number of times a team has been ranked #1 in the postseason poll (the national champion) is shown in parentheses.

In 1999, the results of a postseason poll, if one was conducted, are not known. Therefore, an additional poll has been presumed, and the #1 postseason ranking has been credited to the postseason tournament champion, the Northwestern Oklahoma State Rangers.

Team	Total #1 Rankings
Georgetown (KY)	23 (2)
Carroll (MT)	20 (3)
Sioux Falls (SD)	16
Northwestern Oklahoma State	12 (1)
Azusa Pacific (CA)	3
