= Bob Petrino Sr. =

American football player and coach (1937–2018)

Biographical details
- Born: April 18, 1937; Butte, Montana, U.S.
- Died: July 26, 2018 (aged 81); Helena, Montana, U.S.

Playing career

Football
- c. 1955–1958: Western Montana
- Position: Halfback

Coaching career (HC unless noted)

Football
- 1959–1961: Grass Range HS (MT)
- 1962: Moore HS (MT)
- 1963–1964: Harlowton HS (MT) (assistant)
- 1965–1970: Butte Central Catholic HS (MT)
- 1971–1998: Carroll (MT)

Basketball
- 1962–1963: Moore HS (MT)
- 1963–1965: Harlowton HS (MT)

Head coaching record
- Overall: 163–90–2 (college football)
- Tournaments: 3–6 (NAIA D-I playoffs); 0–2 (NAIA D-II playoffs)

Accomplishments and honors

Championships
- 14 Frontier (1972–1974, 1978, 1980–1982, 1985–1990, 1993)

Vincent Robert "Putter" Petrino (April 18, 1937 – July 26, 2018) was an American football coach. He served as the head football coach at Carroll College in Helena, Montana from 1971 to 1998, compiling record of 163–90–2.

A native of Butte, Montana, Petrino graduated from Butte Central Catholic High School in 1955. He then attended Western Montana College—now known as University of Montana Western—in Dillon, Montana, where played college football as a halfback, before graduating with bachelor's degree in physical education in 1959. Petrino began his coaching career at Grass Range High School in Grass Range, Montana, where as head football coach he led his team to two district championships in three years.

Petrino's sons, Bobby and Paul Petrino, each played college football as a quarterback for their father at Carroll and went on to coaching careers. Petrino died on July 26, 2018, at his home in Helena.

== Head coaching record ==
=== College football ===
Year	Team	Overall	Conference	Standing	Bowl/playoffs
Carroll Fighting Saints (Frontier Conference) (1971–1998)
1971	Carroll	2–5–1	2–2–1	4th	
1972	Carroll	4–3	3–1	T–1st	
1973	Carroll	7–0	4–0	1st	
1974	Carroll	6–2	4–0	1st	
1975	Carroll	3–5	2–2	T–2nd	
1976	Carroll	7–1	4–0	1st	
1977	Carroll	4–4	3–1	2nd	
1978	Carroll	9–1	4–0	1st	L NAIA Division II Quarterfinal
1979	Carroll	6–2	4–1	2nd	
1980	Carroll	6–4	4–2	T–1st	
1981	Carroll	6–3	5–1	1st	
1982	Carroll	5–5	4–2	T–1st	
1983	Carroll	2–7	2–4	3rd	
1984	Carroll	3–5–1	2–3–1	3rd	
1985	Carroll	8–2	5–1	T–1st	L NAIA Division II Quarterfinal
1986	Carroll	9–1	6–0	1st	L NAIA Division II Semifinal
1987	Carroll	8–2	5–0	1st	L NAIA Division II Quarterfinal
1988	Carroll	10–1	6–0	1st	L NAIA Division II Quarterfinal
1989	Carroll	9–2	6–0	1st	L NAIA Division II First Round
1990	Carroll	6–3	5–1	1st	
1991	Carroll	5–4	3–3	T–2nd	
1992	Carroll	4–5	2–4	T–3rd	
1993	Carroll	8–2	5–1	T–1st	L NAIA Division I Quarterfinal
1994	Carroll	4–5	2–4	3rd	
1995	Carroll	5–4	4–2	2nd	
1996	Carroll	6–4	3–3	T–2nd	L NAIA Division I Semifinal
1997	Carroll	4–5	2–4	3rd	
1998	Carroll	1–8	1–5	4th	
Carroll:		163–90–2	102–47–2		
Total:		163–90–2			
National championship Conference title Conference division title or championship game berth
