= 2004 college football season =

The 2004 college football season may refer to:

- 2004 NCAA Division I-A football season
- 2004 NCAA Division I-AA football season
- 2004 NCAA Division II football season
- 2004 NCAA Division III football season
- 2004 NAIA Football National Championship
