= 2004 Carroll Fighting Saints football team =

American college football season

2004 Carroll Fighting Saints football

NAIA national champion Frontier co-champion

NAIA National Championship Game, W 15–13 vs. Saint Francis (IN)
- Conference: Frontier Conference
- Record: 12–2 (6–2 Frontier)
- Head coach: Mike Van Diest (6th season)
- Home stadium: Nelson Stadium

2004 Frontier Conference football standings
	Conf.			Overall
Team	W		L	W		L
No. 1 Carroll (MT) +^	6	–	2	12	–	2
No. 13 Montana Tech +^	6	–	2	8	–	4
No. 24 Montana Western +	6	–	2	7	–	4
Montana State–Northern	1	–	7	1	–	10
Rocky Mountain	1	–	7	1	–	10
+ – Conference co-champions; ^ – NAIA playoff participant; Rankings from NAIA Coaches' Poll

The 2004 Carroll Fighting Saints football team was an American football team that represented Carroll College as a member of the Frontier Conference during the 2004 NAIA football season. In their sixth season under head coach Mike Van Diest, the Saints compiled a perfect 12–2 record (6–2 against conference opponents) and won the NAIA national championship, defeating Saint Francis (Indiana), 15–13, in the NAIA National Championship Game.

The team was led on offense by junior quarterback Tyler Emmert. Emmert received the NAIA Football Player of the Year Award in both 2003 and 2005.

== Schedule ==
Date	Opponent	Site	Result	Attendance	Source
August 28	Central Washington*	Nelson Stadium; Helena, MT	W 27–21	4,857	
September 11	at MSU Northern	Tilleman Field; Havre, MT	W 65–3	1,000	
September 18	at Montana Western	Bulldog Stadium; Dillon, MT	W 28–3	300	
September 25	Rocky Mountain*	Nelson Stadium; Helena, MT	W 35–9	5,417	
October 2	at Azusa Pacific	Cougar Athletic Stadium; Azusa, CA	W 12–0	3,121	
October 9	at Montana Tech	Alumni Coliseum; Butte, MT	L 14–17	3,500	
October 16	Montana Western	Nelson Stadium; Helena, MT	L 17–26	3,387	
October 23	MSU Northern	Nelson Stadium; Helena, MT	W 29–6	3,167	
October 30	at Rocky Mountain	Community Stadium; Billings, MT	W 31–0		
November 13	Montana Tech	Nelson Stadium; Helena, MT	W 34–6	5,687	
November 20	at Mary (ND)*	MDU Resources Community Bowl; Bismarck, ND	W 24–14		
November 27	at Dickinson State (ND)*	Henry Biesiot Activities Center; Dickinson, ND (NAIA quarterfinal)	W 56–17	3,000	
December 4	Azusa Pacific*	Nelson Stadium; Helena, MT (NAIA semifinal)	W 14–10	4,237	
December 18	vs. Saint Francis (IN)*	Jim Carroll Stadium; Savannah, TN (NAIA Championship Game)	W 15–13	5,376	
*Non-conference game
