= Troy Purcell =

American football coach (born 1967)

Current position
- Title: Head coach
- Team: Carroll (MT)
- Conference: Frontier
- Record: 53–25

Biographical details
- Born: c. 1966 or 1967 (age 58–59); Helena, Montana, U.S.
- Education: Carroll College (1990); Montana State University–Northern (2010)

Playing career
- 1986–1989: Carroll (MT)
- Position: Running back / linebacker

Coaching career (HC unless noted)
- 1991–1993: Regis HS (OR)
- 1994–1999: Lincoln County HS (MT)
- 2000–2004: Havre HS (MT)
- 2005–2015: Bozeman HS (MT)
- 2016: Idaho (ILB)
- 2017: Idaho (TE)
- 2018: Idaho (ST/TE)
- 2019–present: Carroll (MT)

Head coaching record
- Overall: 53–25 (college); 169–86 (high school)
- Tournaments: 1–3 (NAIA playoffs)

Accomplishments and honors

Championships
- 2 Frontier Conference (2020, 2022)

Troy Purcell (born c. 1967) is an American college football coach. He is the head football coach for Carroll College, a position he has held since 2019. He also was the head football coach for Regis High School, Lincoln County High School, Havre High School, and Bozeman High School. He also coached for Idaho. He played college football for Carroll (MT) as a running back and linebacker.

== Head coaching record ==
=== College ===
Year	Team	Overall	Conference	Standing	Bowl/playoffs	NAIA Coaches'^{#}
Carroll Fighting Saints (Frontier Conference) (2019–present)
2019	Carroll	6–4	6–4	T–3rd		25
2020–21	Carroll	3–2	3–1	T–1st	L NAIA First Round	22
2021	Carroll	6–4	6–4	4th		
2022	Carroll	8–3	8–2	T–1st	L NAIA First Round	16
2023	Carroll	7–3	5–3	T–4th		24
2024	Carroll	7–3	6–2	T–2nd		
2025	Carroll	9–3	5–1	2nd (West)	L NAIA Second Round	13
2026	Carroll	7–3	4–2	3rd (West)		
Carroll:		53–25	43–19			
Total:		53–25				
National championship Conference title Conference division title or championship game berth

=== High school ===
Year	Team	Overall	Conference	Standing	Bowl/playoffs
Regis Rams () (1991–1993)
Regis:		22–9			
Lincoln County Lions () (1994–1999)
Lincoln County:		32–23			
Havre Blue Ponies () (2000–2004)
Havre:		40–13			
Bozeman Hawks () (2005–2015)
2005	Bozeman	3–7	2–7	11th	
2006	Bozeman	4–6	4–5	8th	
2007	Bozeman	4–6	4–6	8th	
2008	Bozeman	3–7	3–7	10th	
2009	Bozeman	6–4	6–4	6th	
2010	Bozeman	12–0	9–0	1st	
2011	Bozeman	3–7	3–7	11th	
2012	Bozeman	9–4	7–3	5th	
2013	Bozeman	13–0	10–0	1st	
2014	Bozeman	5–6	5–5	7th	
2015	Bozeman	13–1	9–1	1st	
Bozeman:		75–48	62–45		
Total:		169–86			
National championship Conference title Conference division title or championship game berth
