= 2005 Carroll Fighting Saints football team =

American college football season

2005 Carroll Fighting Saints football

NAIA national champion Frontier champion

NAIA National Championship Game, W 27–10 vs. Saint Francis (IN)
- Conference: Frontier Conference
- Record: 14–0 (8–0 Frontier)
- Head coach: Mike Van Diest (7th season)
- Home stadium: Nelson Stadium

2005 Frontier Conference football standings
	Conf.			Overall
Team	W		L	W		L
No. 1 Carroll (MT) $^	8	–	0	14	–	0
No. 7 Montana Tech ^	6	–	2	9	–	4
Montana State–Northern	3	–	5	5	–	5
Montana Western	2	–	6	2	–	9
Rocky Mountain	1	–	7	1	–	10
$ – Conference champion; ^ – NAIA playoff participant; Rankings from NAIA Coaches' Poll

The 2005 Carroll Fighting Saints football team was an American football team that represented Carroll College as a member of the Frontier Conference during the 2005 NAIA football season. In their seventh season under head coach Mike Van Diest, the Saints compiled a perfect 14–0 record (8–0 against conference opponents) and won the NAIA national championship, defeating Saint Francis (Indiana), 27–10, in the NAIA National Championship Game.

The team was led on offense by junior quarterback Tyler Emmert. Emmert received the NAIA Football Player of the Year Award in both 2003 and 2005.

The team played its home games at Nelson Stadium in Helena, Montana.

== Schedule ==
Date	Opponent	Site	Result	Attendance	Source
September 2	at Eastern Oregon*	Community Stadium; La Grande, OR	W 44–14	726	
September 10	Azusa Pacific*	Nelson Stadium; Helena, MT	W 27–7	5,385	
September 17	MSU Northern	Nelson Stadium; Helena, MT	W 31–14	5,573	
September 24	at Montana Western	Bulldog Stadium; Dillon, MT	W 37–7		
October 1	at Rocky Mountain	Community Stadium; Billings, MT	W 49–14		
October 15	Montana Tech	Nelson Stadium; Helena, MT	W 45–3	6,187	
October 22	at MSU Northern	Tilleman Field; Havre, MT	W 47–21		
October 29	Montana Western	Nelson Stadium; Helena, MT	W 45–0	4,734	
November 5	at Montana Tech	Alumni Coliseum; Butte, MT	W 21–16		
November 12	Rocky Mountain	Nelson Stadium; Helena, MT	W 66–13	4,532	
November 19	Dickinson State*	Nelson Stadium; Helena, MT (NAIA first round)	W 23–13	4,834	
November 26	Montana Tech	Nelson Stadium; Helena, MT (NAIA quarterfinal)	W 24–0	5,396	
December 3	Sioux Falls (SD)*	Nelson Stadium; Helena, MT (NAIA semifinal)	W 55–0	4,437	
December 17	vs. Saint Francis (IN)*	Jim Carroll Stadium; Savannah, TN (NAIA Championship Game)	W 27–10	6,313	
*Non-conference game
