= Dewey Halford =

American football coach and administrator (1919–1994)

Biographical details
- Born: March 28, 1919; Manning, Iowa, U.S.
- Died: October 16, 1994 (aged 75); Spirit Lake, Iowa, U.S.

Playing career

Football
- 1938–1940: Morningside

Basketball
- 1938–1941: Morningside
- Positions: Halfback, quarterback (football)

Coaching career (HC unless noted)

Football
- 1941: Linn Grove HS (IA)
- 1946–1947: Rock Rapids HS (IA)
- 1948–1954: Sac City HS (IA)
- 1955–1973: Morningside

Administrative career (AD unless noted)
- 1969–1973: Morningside
- 1977–1994: NCC (commissioner)

Head coaching record
- Overall: 72–93–3 (college)

Accomplishments and honors

Championships
- 1 NCC (1956)

Awards
- NAIA Coach of the Year (1956)

Robert Duane "Dewey" Halford (March 28, 1919 – October 16, 1994) was an American football coach and college athletic administrator. He was the head football coach at Morningside College in Sioux City, Iowa, serving for 19 seasons, from 1955 to 1973, and compiling a record of 72–93–3. Halford was also the athletic director at Morningside from 1969 to 1973 and the commissioner of the North Central Conference (NCC) from 1977 to 1984.

Halford was born on March 28, 1919, in Manning, Iowa. He died on October 16, 1994, at Dickinson Country Memorial Hospital in Spirit Lake, Iowa.

== Head coaching record ==
=== College ===
Year	Team	Overall	Conference	Standing	Bowl/playoffs
Morningside Maroons / Maroon Chiefs / Chiefs (North Central Conference) (1955–1973)
1955	Morningside	4–3–1	3–2–1	3rd	
1956	Morningside	6–1–1	4–1–1	1st	
1957	Morningside	6–2–1	4–1–1	2nd	
1958	Morningside	4–4	3–3	T–3rd	
1959	Morningside	5–4	3–3	T–4th	
1960	Morningside	4–5	2–4	6th	
1961	Morningside	3–6	2–4	5th	
1962	Morningside	2–7	2–4	5th	
1963	Morningside	3–5	1–5	T–6th	
1964	Morningside	4–5	2–4	T–4th	
1965	Morningside	5–4	3–3	4th	
1966	Morningside	3–6	1–5	7th	
1967	Morningside	4–5	2–4	T–4th	
1968	Morningside	4–5	2–4	T–5th	
1969	Morningside	4–5	2–4	T–5th	
1970	Morningside	3–5	2–4	5th	
1971	Morningside	6–4	3–3	T–4th	
1972	Morningside	2–8	1–6	T–7th	
1973	Morningside	0–9	0–7	8th	
Morningside:		72–93–3	42–71–3		
Total:		72–93–3			
National championship Conference title Conference division title or championship game berth
