= Briar Cliff Chargers football =

College football team

Briar Cliff Chargers Football
- First season: 2003; 23 years ago
- Athletic director: Dan McDermott
- Head coach: Nathan Koziol; 1st season, 1–10 (.091)
- Location: Sioux City, Iowa
- Stadium: Bishop Heelan Memorial Field (capacity: 1,600)
- Conference: GPAC
- Colors: Blue and gold
- All-time record: 62–198 (.238)
- Rivalries: Morningside University Mount Marty University
- Mascot: Bolt the Charger
- Website: bcuchargers.com

The Briar Cliff Chargers football team represents Briar Cliff University in college football in the National Association of Intercollegiate Athletics (NAIA). The Chargers are members of the Great Plains Athletic Conference (GPAC), fielding its team in the GPAC since 2003. The Chargers play their home games at Bishop Heelan Memorial Field in Sioux City, Iowa.

Their head coach is Nathan Koziol, who took over the position in 2026.

== Conference affiliations ==
- Club team (2001–2002)
- Great Plains Athletic Conference (2003–present)

== List of head coaches ==
=== Key ===
Key to symbols in coaches list
General		Overall		Conference		Postseason (Note: Although the first Rose Bowl Game was played in 1902, it has been continuously played since the 1916 game, and is recognized as the oldest bowl game by the NCAA. "—" indicates any season prior to 1916 when postseason games were not played.)	
No.	Order of coaches (Note: A running total of the number of head coaches, with coaches who served separate tenures being counted only once. Interim head coaches are represented with "Int" and are not counted in the running total. "—" indicates the team played but either without a coach or no coach is on record. "X" indicates an interim year without play.)	GC	Games coached	CW	Conference wins	PW	Postseason wins
DC	Division championships	OW	Overall wins	CL	Conference losses	PL	Postseason losses
CC	Conference championships	OL	Overall losses	CT	Conference ties	PT	Postseason ties
NC	National championships	OT	Overall ties (Note: Overtime rules in college football were introduced in 1996, making ties impossible in the period since.)	C%	Conference winning percentage		
†	Elected to the College Football Hall of Fame	O%	Overall winning percentage (Note: When computing the win–loss percentage, a tie counts as half a win and half a loss.)				

=== Coaches ===
List of head football coaches showing season(s) coached, overall records and conference records
No.	Name	Season(s)	GC	OW	OL	OT	O%	CW	CL	CT	C%
1	Dick Strittmatter	2001–2007	53	12	41	0	0.226	10	40	0	0.200
2	Tom Rethman	2008–2016	99	21	78	0	0.212	16	67	0	0.193
3	Dennis Wagner	2017–2020	42	12	30	0	0.286	9	26	0	0.257
4	Shane LaDage	2021–2025	55	16	39	0	0.262	15	35	0	0.300
5	Nathan Koziol	2026–present	11	1	10	0	0.090	1	9	0	0.100

== Year-by-year results ==
National champions	Conference champions	Bowl game berth	Playoff berth

Season	Year	Head coach	Association	Division	Conference	Record							Postseason	Final ranking
Season	Year	Head coach	Association	Division	Conference	Overall			Conference				Postseason	Final ranking
Season	Year	Head coach	Association	Division	Conference	Win	Loss	Tie	Finish	Win	Loss	Tie	Postseason	Final ranking
Briar Cliff Chargers
2001	2001	Dick Strittmatter	Club team										—	—
2002	2002	Dick Strittmatter	Club team										—	—
2003	2003	Dick Strittmatter	NAIA	—	GPAC	0	10	0	11th	0	10	0	—	—
2004	2004	Dick Strittmatter	NAIA	—	GPAC	3	7	0	8th	3	7	0	—	—
2005	2005	Dick Strittmatter	NAIA	—	GPAC	4	7	0	9th	3	7	0	—	—
2006	2006	Dick Strittmatter	NAIA	—	GPAC	5	6	0	T–6th	4	6	0	—	—
2007	2007	Dick Strittmatter	NAIA	—	GPAC	0	11	0	11th	0	10	0	—	—
2008	2008	Tom Rethman	NAIA	—	GPAC	2	9	0	T–9th	2	8	0	—	—
2009	2009	Tom Rethman	NAIA	—	GPAC	4	7	0	T–7th	4	6	0	—	—
2010	2010	Tom Rethman	NAIA	—	GPAC	2	9	0	10th	1	9	0	—	—
2011	2011	Tom Rethman	NAIA	—	GPAC	2	9	0	9th	1	8	0	—	
2012	2012	Tom Rethman	NAIA	—	GPAC	1	10	0	9th	1	8	0	—	—
2013	2013	Tom Rethman	NAIA	—	GPAC	4	7	0	T–7th	3	6	0	—	—
2014	2014	Tom Rethman	NAIA	—	GPAC	2	9	0	8th	2	7	0	—	—
2015	2015	Tom Rethman	NAIA	—	GPAC	3	8	0	8th	2	7	0	—	—
2016	2016	Tom Rethman	NAIA	—	GPAC	1	10	0	9th	0	8	0	—	—
2017	2017	Dennis Wagner	NAIA	—	GPAC	0	11	0	9th	0	8	0	—	—
2018	2018	Dennis Wagner	NAIA	—	GPAC	6	5	0	6th	4	5	0	—	—
2019	2019	Dennis Wagner	NAIA	—	GPAC	5	6	0	T–5th	4	5	0	—	—
2020	2020	Dennis Wagner	NAIA	—	GPAC	1	8	0	10th	1	8	0	—	—
2021	2021	Shane LaDage	NAIA	—	GPAC	3	8	0	8th	3	7	0	—	—
2022	2022	Shane LaDage	NAIA	—	GPAC	1	10	0	11th	1	9	0	—	—
2023	2023	Shane LaDage	NAIA	—	GPAC	4	7	0	T–7th	4	6	0	—	—
2024	2024	Shane LaDage	NAIA	—	GPAC	2	9	0	T–9th	2	8	0	—	—
2025	2025	Shane LaDage	NAIA	—	GPAC	6	5	0	T–6th	5	5	0	—	—
2026	2026	Nathan Koziol	NAIA	—	GPAC	1	10	0	10th	1	9	0	—	—
