= Carl Iverson =

American football coach (1940–2021)

Biographical details
- Born: June 18, 1940; Seattle, Washington, U.S.
- Died: February 11, 2021 (aged 80); Monmouth, Oregon, U.S.
- Education: Whitman College; University of Wisconsin

Coaching career (HC unless noted)
- 1967: Western State (CO) (ends)
- 1968–1972: Northern State (assistant)
- 1973: Flathead HS (MT)
- 1974–1978: Western State (CO) (assistant)
- 1979: BYU (assistant)
- 1980–1982: Gateway HS (CO)
- 1983–1984: Black Hills State
- 1985–1987: Western Oregon
- 1988–1995: Western State (CO)
- 1997–2000: Western State (CO)
- 2001–2004: Western Oregon
- 2006–2007: Western State (CO) (OC)

Head coaching record
- Overall: 126–85–3 (college); 25–17 (high school)
- Tournaments: 1–2 (NAIA D-I playoffs); 0–3 (NCAA D-II playoffs)

Accomplishments and honors

Championships
- 2 SDIC (1983–1984); 6 RMAC (1991–1992, 1994–1995, 1997–1998)

Awards
- NAIA Division I Coach of the Year (1991); 2× RMAC Coach of the Year (1996–1997)

Carl "Duke" Iverson (June 18, 1940 – February 11, 2021) was an American football coach. He served as the head football coach at Black Hills State University from 1983 to 1984, Western Oregon University from 1985 to 1987 and again from 2001 to 2004, and Western State College of Colorado—now known as Western Colorado University—from 1988 to 1995 and again from 1997 to 2000, compiling a career college football coaching record of 126–85–3. Prior to his retirement in 2008, Iverson returned to Western State Colorado for two seasons as offensive coordinator.

Iverson graduated from Pe Ell High School in Pe Ell, Washington before earning his B.A. in chemistry from Whitman College in 1962 and his Ph.D. in biological science from the University of Wisconsin in 1967. In the fall of 1967, he began his coaching career as an assistant at Western State College of Colorado.

Iverson died on February 11, 2021, at his home in Monmouth, Oregon.

== Head coaching record ==
=== College ===
Year	Team	Overall	Conference	Standing	Bowl/playoffs	NAIA/NCAA^{#}
Black Hills State Yellow Jackets (South Dakota Intercollegiate Conference) (1983–1984)
1983	Black Hills State	5–2–2	5–0–2	1st		
1984	Black Hills State	8–2	5–1	T–1st		
Black Hills State:		13–4–2	10–1–2			
Western Oregon Wolves (Columbia Football League) (1985–1987)
1985	Western Oregon	8–2	5–1	2nd (Southern)	L NAIA Division I Quarterfinal	8
1986	Western Oregon	7–2	5–1	2nd (Southern)		13
1987	Western Oregon	5–4	3–3	5th (Southern)		
Western State Mountaineers (Rocky Mountain Athletic Conference) (1988–1995)
1988	Western State	4–5	2–3	T–4th		
1989	Western State	3–7	2–5	4th		
1990	Western State	3–7	1–3	T–3rd		
1991	Western State	10–2	6–0	1st	L NAIA Division I Semifinal	5
1992	Western State	9–2	7–0	1st	L NCAA Division II First Round	T–7
1993	Western State	8–3	5–2	T–2nd		
1994	Western State	8–3	6–1	1st	L NCAA Division II First Round	14
1995	Western State	7–2–1	6–0–1	T–1st		
Western State Mountaineers (Rocky Mountain Athletic Conference) (1997–2000)
1997	Western State	9–3	7–1	1st	L NCAA Division II First Round	9
1998	Western State	7–3	7–1	T–1st		
1999	Western State	5–6	4–4	T–4th		
2000	Western State	6–5	5–3	4th		
Western State:		79–48–1	58–23–1			
Western Oregon Wolves (Great Northwest Athletic Conference) (2001–2004)
2001	Western Oregon	6–5	1–2	T–2nd		
2002	Western Oregon	5–5	1–2	3rd		
2003	Western Oregon	4–6	1–2	3rd		
2004	Western Oregon	1–9	1–5	4th		
Western Oregon:		34–33	17–16			
Total:		126–85–3				
National championship Conference title Conference division title or championship game berth
^{#}Rankings from final NCAA Division I poll from 1985 to 1981 and final NCAA Division II Football Committee poll from 1992 to 1997.
