= 2010 Saint Francis Cougars football team =

American college football season

2010 Saint Francis Cougars football

NAIA Playoff Quarterfinalist
- Conference: Mid-States Football Association
- Mideast League
- Record: 10–2 (6–1 MSFA (MEL))
- Head coach: Kevin Donley (13th season)
- Offensive coordinator: Patrick Donley, Trevor Miller (7th, 5th season)
- Defensive coordinator: Joey Didier, Eric Wagoner (1st, 3rd season)
- Home stadium: Bishop John M. D'Arcy Stadium

2010 Mid-States Football Association standings
	Conf.			Overall
Team	W		L	W		L
Mideast League
No. 3 Saint Xavier x^	7	–	0	13	–	1
No. 5 Saint Francis (IN) ^	6	–	1	10	–	2
No. 7 Marian (IN) ^	5	–	2	10	–	3
Taylor	4	–	3	6	–	5
Walsh	3	–	4	7	–	4
Malone	2	–	5	3	–	7
Trinity International	1	–	6	3	–	8
Olivet Nazarene	0	–	7	0	–	11
Midwest League
No. 12 William Penn x	6	–	1	10	–	1
No. 8 McKendree x^	6	–	1	9	–	3
St. Francis (IL)	5	–	2	7	–	4
Grand View	4	–	3	6	–	4
St. Ambrose	3	–	4	5	–	5
Iowa Wesleyan	3	–	4	3	–	8
Waldorf	1	–	6	3	–	8
Quincy	0	–	7	0	–	11
x – League champion/co-champions ^ – NAIA playoff participant; Rankings from NAIA Coaches' Poll

The 2010 Saint Francis Cougars football team represented the University of Saint Francis, located in Fort Wayne, Indiana, in the 2010 NAIA football season. They were led by head coach Kevin Donley, who served his 13th year as the first and only head coach in the history of Saint Francis football. The Cougars played their home games at Bishop John D'Arcy Stadium and were members of the Mid-States Football Association (MSFA) Mideast League (MEL). The Cougars finished in 2nd place in the MSFA MEL division, but they received an at-large bid to participate in the postseason NAIA playoffs.

== Schedule ==
(10–2 overall, 6–1 conference)

Date	Time	Opponent	Rank	Site	Result	Attendance
September 11	2:00pm	at Iowa Wesleyan*	No. 17	Mapleleaf Stadium; Mt. Pleasant, IA	W 70–7	921
September 18	Noon	No. 17 St. Ambrose*	No. 11	Bishop D'Arcy Stadium; Fort Wayne, IN	W 31–20	3,000
September 25	1:00pm	at No. 13 Marian	No. 9	St.V Health Field; Indianapolis, IN	W 28–25	3,273
October 2	Noon	Malone^{†}	No. 9	Bishop D'Arcy Stadium; Fort Wayne, IN	W 42–14	3,000
October 9	Noon	No. 8 Walsh	No. 9	Bishop D'Arcy Stadium; Fort Wayne, IN	W 20–14	3,100
October 16	2:00pm	at Trinity International	No. 8	Leslie Frasier Field; Deerfield, IL	W 33–6	563
October 23	Noon	Missouri U of S&T*	No. 7	Bishop D'Arcy Stadium; Fort Wayne, IN	W 41–14	2,300
October 30	1:00pm	at Olivet Nazarene	No. 7	Ward Field; Bourbonnais, IL	W 63–7	2,102
November 6	2:00pm	at No. 3 Saint Xavier	No. 7	Deaton Field; Chicago, IL	L 6–30	3,300
November 13	Noon	Taylor	No. 10	Bishop D'Arcy Stadium; Fort Wayne, IN	W 33–21	3,350
November 20	1:30pm	at No. 5 Lindenwood*	No. 10	Harlen C. Hunter Stadium; St. Charles, Mo. (NAIA First Round)	W 44–38	1,392
November 27	2:00pm	at No. 3 Saint Xavier*	No. 10	Deaton Field; Chicago, IL (NAIA Quarterfinal)	L 21–40	3,500
*Non-conference game; ^{†}Homecoming; Rankings from Coaches' Poll released prior to the game; All times are in Eastern time

== Game summaries ==
The 2010 season began explosively as the 17th-ranked Cougars won impressively on the road, 70–7.
9/18/2010 - Week #2 saw the Cougars elevated to 11th in the national rankings. The opponent for the home-opener was another ranked team, 17th-ranked St. Ambrose. Trailing 17–0 at the half, the Cougars showed some maturity by rebounding in the second half for a 31–20 win. For their victory, the Cougars were rewarded with a rise in the rankings to the 9th-best team in the country.

9/25/2010 - Leading 28–3 at the half, USF held on for a hard-fought road victory against a highly regarded Marian. The road win was the first game for Marian in their new St. Vincent Health Field.

10/9/2010 - The win over Walsh was an upset in the national rankings that listed Walsh as #8 and USF as the #9 team in the nation.

10/23/2010 - With a 41–14 home win over Missouri U S&T, the 7th-ranked Cougars remained undefeated and avenged a 2-point loss on the road against last year's Miners.

10/30/2010 - With their 63–0 win over Olivet Nazarene, USF record moved to 8-0 for the season. Next week's game at #3 St. Xavier will match two undefeated, NAIA top-10 Cougar teams to decide the conference and division championships.

11/6/2010 - St. Xavier dominated this game in a 30–6 victory for the home team. The six point offensive output was the lowest points scored by a USF team in a regular season game since the 11th game of their program, the opening game of the 1999 season. For the second time in two years, this victory gave the MSFA conference and league title to St. Xavier.

11/13/2010 - With their 33–21 win over Taylor University, USF avenged the season-ending loss from a year ago. The win guarantees the 10th-ranked USF an appearance next week in the opening round of the 16-team NAIA Championship tournament.

11/20/2010 - Ranked #10 in the final NAIA regular-season poll, USF drew a road trip to Lindenwood for the first round of the playoffs. The 5th-ranked Lions, 9–1 on the regular season, entered the game with the nation's highest scoring offense. The Cougars pulled off the upset win, 44–38, with an offense that efficiently controlled the football for over 40 minutes of the 60-minute game. For the win, the Cougars earned a rematch in the second round against MSFA foe St. Xavier.

11/27/2010 - The Cougars return visit to St. Xavier ended with the same results as the first meeting of the year, a 40–21 loss. Thus, the USF season ended with a 10–2 record, with both losses coming on the St. Xavier home field.

1/10/2011 - The Cougars were recognized for their successful season by voters in the postseason NAIA football polls. The Cougars improved 5 spots in the polls, behind only the four semifinalists in the national tournament. The 5th-place ranking gave the Cougars their best poll position of the season.

== Ranking movements ==
Ranking movements Legend: ██ Increase in ranking ██ Decrease in ranking т = Tied with team above or below
	Week											
Poll	Pre	1	2	3	4	5	6	7	8	9	10	Final
NAIA Coaches' Poll	17	T-11	9	9	9	8	7	7	7	10	10	5
