= Oredigger =

Oredigger may refer to:

- Montana Tech Orediggers
- Colorado Mines Orediggers
