= 2010 Carroll Fighting Saints football team =

American college football season

2010 Carroll Fighting Saints football

NAIA national champion Frontier champion

NAIA National Championship Game, W 10–7 vs. Sioux Falls
- Conference: Frontier Conference
- Record: 14–0 (10–0 Frontier)
- Head coach: Mike Van Diest (12th season)

2010 Frontier Conference football standings
	Conf.			Overall
Team	W		L	W		L
No. 1 Carroll (MT) $^	10	–	0	14	–	0
Rocky Mountain	6	–	4	6	–	5
Eastern Oregon	5	–	5	5	–	6
Montana Tech	5	–	5	5	–	6
Montana State–Northern	3	–	7	3	–	7
Montana Western	1	–	9	1	–	10
$ – Conference champion; ^ – NAIA playoff participant; Rankings from NAIA Coaches' Poll

The 2010 Carroll Fighting Saints football team was an American football team that represented Carroll College as a member of the Frontier Conference during the 2010 NAIA football season. In their 12th season under head coach Mike Van Diest, the Saints compiled a 14–0 record (10–0 against conference opponents) and won the NAIA national championship, defeating Sioux Falls, 10–7, in the NAIA National Championship Game.

== Schedule ==
Date	Opponent	Site	Result	Attendance	Source
September 4	Rocky Mountain	Nelson Stadium; Helena, MT	W 24–20	6,437	
September 11	at Eastern Oregon	Community Stadium; La Grande, OR	W 49–12		
September 18	at Montana Western	Bulldog Stadium; Dillon, MT	W 28–12		
September 25	Montana Tech	Nelson Stadium; Helena, MT	W 31–13	8,817	
October 2	at MSU Northern	Tilleman Field; Havre, MT	W 65–13		
October 16	at Rocky Mountain	Community Stadium; Billings, MT	W 42–37		
October 23	Eastern Oregon	Nelson Stadium; Helena, MT	W 61–34	4,337	
October 30	Montana Western	Nelson Stadium; Helena, MT	W 42–3	4,091	
November 6	at Montana Tech	Alumni Coliseum; Butte, MT	W 46–10		
November 13	MSU Northern	Nelson Stadium; Helena, MT	W 35–10	3,222	
November 20	Azusa Pacific*	Nelson Stadium; Helena, MT (NAIA first round)	W 35–21	1,800	
November 27	Marian*	Nelson Stadium; Helena, MT (NAIA quarterfinal)	W 38–6	3,200	
December 4	St. Xavier (IL)*	Nelson Stadium; Helena, MT (NAIA semifinal)	W 27–5	3,827	
December 18	vs. Sioux Falls*	Barron Stadium Rome, GA; (NAIA Championship Game)	W 10–7	6,000	
*Non-conference game
