= 2005 NAIA football national championship =

College football championships

2005 NAIA Football Championship
	1st	2nd	3rd	4th	Total
Saint Francis (IN)	3	0	7	0	10
Carroll (MT)	7	10	7	3	27
- Date: December 17, 2005
- Stadium: Jim Carroll Stadium
- City: Savannah, Tennessee
- MOP (Offense): Tyler Emmert, Carroll
- MOP (Defense): Matt Thomas, Carroll
- Officials: Brian Keeling; Jim Boer; Ken Zelmanski; Bob Mahnic; John Wagner; Paul Stout; Jeff Garvin
- Attendance: 6,313

== Tournament bracket ==
The 2005 NAIA Football Championship Series concluded on December 17, 2005, with the championship game played at Jim Carroll Stadium in Savannah, Tennessee. In a battle between two unbeaten teams, the game was won by the Carroll Fighting Saints over the Saint Francis Cougars by a score of 27–10.

=== Scoring Summary ===
Scoring summary

Quarter	Time	Drive			Team	Scoring information	Score	
Quarter	Time	Plays	Yards	TOP	Team	Scoring information	Saint Francis Cougars	Carroll Fighting Saints
1	6:20	17	68	8:40	Saint Francis Cougars	30-yard field goal by Cale Grzych	3	0
1	3:13	8	65	3:07	Carroll Fighting Saints	Tyler Peterson 18-yard touchdown reception from Tyler Emmert, Marcus Miller kick Good	3	7
2	2:29	14	78	4:52	Carroll Fighting Saints	26-yard field goal by Marcus Miller	3	10
2	0:00	6	64	3:16	Carroll Fighting Saints	Bryce Doak 32-yard touchdown reception from Tyler Emmert, Marcus Miller kick Good	3	17
3	6:57	13	66	5:49	Saint Francis Cougars	Bo Thompson 18-yard touchdown reception from Chris Bramell, Cale Grzych kick Good	10	17
3	0:48	5	40	2:19	Carroll Fighting Saints	Marshall McEwen 17-yard touchdown reception from Tyler Emmert, Marcus Miller kick Good	10	24
4	4:34	18	74	9:22	Carroll Fighting Saints	33-yard field goal by Marcus Miller	10	27
"TOP" = time of possession. For other American football terms, see Glossary of American football.							Saint Francis Cougars	Carroll Fighting Saints

1st Round; November 19
1	Carroll (MT) (10–0)	23
15	Dickinson State (7–3)	13
9	Azusa Pacific (6–3)	17
11	Montana Tech (8–3)	24
4	Sioux Falls (SD) (9–1)	31
7	Saint Xavier (IL) (9–2)	28
6	Tabor (KS) (10–0)	17
12	Graceland (IA) (9–2)	14
2	Saint Francis (IN) (10–0)	41
13	Pikeville (KY) (7–2)	7
5	Georgetown (KY) (9–2)	36
16	Geneva (PA) (8–3)	35
3	Morningside (IA) (10–0)	58
14	Saint Ambrose (IA) (8–2)	7
8	McKendree (IL) (8–2)	31
10	Evangel (MO) (8–2)	34

Quarterfinals; November 26
1	Carroll (MT)	24
11	Montana Tech	0
4	Sioux Falls (SD)	48
6	Tabor (KS)	13
2	Saint Francis (IN)	44
5	Georgetown (KY)	14
3	Morningside (IA)	54
10	Evangel (MO)	21

Semifinals; December 3
1	Carroll (MT)	55
4	Sioux Falls (SD)	0
2	Saint Francis (IN)	42
3	Morningside (IA)	14

Championship; December 17
1	Carroll (MT)	27
2	Saint Francis (IN)	10

- * denotes OT.
