= 2005 NAIA football season =

American college football season

- National Championship: Jim Carroll Stadium; Savannah, TN; December 17, 2005
- Champion: Carroll (MT)
- Player of the Year: Tyler Emmert (quarterback, Carroll (MT))

The 2005 NAIA football season was the component of the 2005 college football season organized by the National Association of Intercollegiate Athletics (NAIA) in the United States. The season's playoffs, known as the NAIA Football National Championship, culminated with the championship game on December 17, at Jim Carroll Stadium in Savannah, Tennessee. The Carroll Fighting Saints defeated the Saint Francis Cougars, 27–10, in the title game to win the program's fourth consecutive NAIA championship.

== Conference standings ==
2005 Central States Football League standings
	Conf.			Overall
Team	W		L	W		L
Langston +	5	–	1	7	–	3
No. 25 Texas College +	5	–	1	6	–	4
Southern Nazarene	4	–	2	6	–	4
NW Oklahoma State	4	–	2	4	–	5
Bacone	2	–	4	4	–	6
Haskell	1	–	5	4	–	7
Peru State	0	–	6	1	–	10
+ – Conference co-champions; Rankings from NAIA Coaches' Poll

2005 Dakota Athletic Conference football standings
	Conf.			Overall
Team	W		L	W		L
No. 22 Valley City State +	6	–	1	7	–	3
No. 11 Dickinson State +^	6	–	1	7	–	4
No. 24 Black Hills State	5	–	2	7	–	3
Dakota State	3	–	4	4	–	6
Minot State	3	–	4	4	–	6
Jamestown	3	–	4	3	–	7
Mayville State	1	–	6	2	–	8
South Dakota Mines	1	–	6	1	–	9
+ – Conference co-champions; ^ – NAIA playoff participant; Rankings from NAIA Coaches' Poll

2005 Frontier Conference football standings
	Conf.			Overall
Team	W		L	W		L
No. 1 Carroll (MT) $^	8	–	0	14	–	0
No. 7 Montana Tech ^	6	–	2	9	–	4
Montana State–Northern	3	–	5	5	–	5
Montana Western	2	–	6	2	–	9
Rocky Mountain	1	–	7	1	–	10
$ – Conference champion; ^ – NAIA playoff participant; Rankings from NAIA Coaches' Poll

2005 Great Plains Athletic Conference football standings
	Conf.			Overall
Team	W		L	W		L
No. 3 Morningside $^	10	–	0	12	–	1
No. 4 Sioux Falls ^	9	–	1	11	–	2
No. 17 Northwestern (IA)	7	–	3	8	–	3
Midland Lutheran	6	–	4	6	–	4
Nebraska Wesleyan	5	–	5	5	–	5
Dana	4	–	6	5	–	6
Concordia (NE)	4	–	6	4	–	6
Hastings	4	–	6	4	–	6
Briar Cliff	3	–	7	4	–	7
Doane	2	–	8	2	–	8
Dakota Wesleyan	1	–	9	1	–	9
$ – Conference champion; ^ – NAIA playoff participant; Rankings from NAIA Coaches' Poll

2005 Heart of America Athletic Conference football standings
	Conf.			Overall
Team	W		L	W		L
No. 8 Evangel +^	8	–	2	9	–	3
No. 13 Graceland +^	8	–	2	9	–	3
No. 19 MidAmerica Nazarene	7	–	3	7	–	3
Lindenwood	7	–	3	7	–	4
Benedictine (KS)	6	–	4	6	–	4
William Jewell	6	–	4	6	–	4
Missouri Valley	4	–	6	5	–	6
Culver–Stockton	3	–	7	3	–	7
Baker	3	–	7	3	–	8
Central Methodist	3	–	7	3	–	8
Avila	0	–	10	0	–	10
+ – Conference co-champions; ^ – NAIA playoff participant; Rankings from NAIA Coaches' Poll

2005 Kansas Collegiate Athletic Conference football standings
	Conf.			Overall
Team	W		L	W		L
No. 6 Tabor $^	9	–	0	11	–	1
No. 20 Kansas Wesleyan	7	–	2	8	–	2
Friends	6	–	3	7	–	3
Sterling	5	–	4	5	–	4
McPherson	4	–	5	5	–	5
Ottawa	4	–	5	5	–	5
Saint Mary (KS)	4	–	5	5	–	5
Bethel (KS)	2	–	7	3	–	7
Southwestern (KS)	2	–	7	3	–	7
Bethany (KS)	2	–	7	2	–	8
$ – Conference champion; ^ – NAIA playoff participant; Rankings from NAIA Coaches' Poll

2005 Mid-South Conference football standings
	Conf.			Overall
Team	W		L	W		L
East Division
No. 5 Georgetown (KY) x^	5	–	0	9	–	3
No. 21 Cumberlands (KY)	3	–	2	8	–	3
No. 15 Pikeville ^	3	–	2	7	–	3
Union (KY)	3	–	2	4	–	6
Virginia–Wise	1	–	4	4	–	7
Shorter	0	–	5	2	–	8
West Division
No. 23 Bethel (TN) x	5	–	0	7	–	4
Belhaven	3	–	2	5	–	6
Lambuth	3	–	2	5	–	6
Kentucky Wesleyan	2	–	3	3	–	7
Campbellsville	2	–	3	2	–	8
Cumberland (TN)	0	–	5	2	–	8
x – Division champion/co-champions; ^ – NAIA playoff participant; Rankings from NAIA Coaches' Poll

2005 Mid-States Football Association standings
	Conf.			Overall
Team	W		L	W		L
Mideast League
No. 2 St. Francis (IN) x^	7	–	0	13	–	1
No. 18 Walsh	5	–	2	8	–	3
No. 14 Geneva ^	5	–	2	8	–	4
Quincy	4	–	3	5	–	6
Urbana	3	–	4	6	–	5
Malone	2	–	5	3	–	7
Ohio Dominican	2	–	5	3	–	7
Taylor	0	–	7	0	–	10
Midwest League
No. 9 Saint Xavier x^	6	–	1	9	–	3
No. 10 McKendree x^	6	–	1	8	–	3
No. 16 St. Ambrose ^	5	–	2	8	–	3
William Penn	4	–	3	6	–	5
Olivet Nazarene	3	–	4	6	–	6
Trinity International	2	–	5	3	–	7
Iowa Wesleyan	2	–	5	3	–	8
St. Francis (IL)	0	–	7	2	–	9
x – League champion/co-champions ^ – NAIA playoff participant; Rankings from NAIA Coaches' Poll

2005 NAIA independents football records
	Conf.			Overall
Team	W		L	W		L
Webber International *		–		6	–	2
Eastern Oregon		–		6	–	3
No. 12 Azusa Pacific ^		–		6	–	4
Allen		–		4	–	4
Southern Virginia *		–		3	–	5
Paul Quinn		–		3	–	6
Edward Waters		–		2	–	7
SAGU		–		2	–	8
Waldorf		–		2	–	9
Seton Hill		–		1	–	9
Southern Oregon		–		1	–	9
^ – NAIA playoff participant * – Webber International later forfeited two wins and Southern Virginia forfeited three.; Rankings from NAIA Coaches' Poll
