= 2004 NAIA football national championship =

2004 NAIA Football Championship
	1st	2nd	3rd	4th	Total
Carroll (MT)	0	6	0	9	15
Saint Francis (IN)	7	0	0	6	13
- Date: December 18, 2004
- Stadium: Jim Carroll Stadium
- City: Savannah, Tennessee
- MOP (Offense): Tyler Emmert, Carroll
- MOP (Defense): Marty Starks, Saint Francis
- Officials: Scott Cooper
- Attendance: 5,376

The 2004 NAIA football championship series concluded on December 18, 2004, with the championship game played at Jim Carroll Stadium in Savannah, Tennessee. The game was won by the Carroll Fighting Saints over the Saint Francis Cougars by a score of 15–13.

== Scoring Summary ==
Scoring summary

Quarter	Time	Drive			Team	Scoring information	Score	
Quarter	Time	Plays	Yards	TOP	Team	Scoring information	Carroll Fighting Saints	Saint Francis Cougars
1	9:40	-	-	-	Saint Francis Cougars	48 Yard Blocked Punt return Touchdown by Zach Rainey, Michael Zoller Kick Good	0	7
2	4:49	10	45	-	Carroll Fighting Saints	Kevin McCutcheon 14-yard touchdown reception from Tyler Emmert, Marcus Miller kick Blocked	6	7
4	6:56	7	46	-	Carroll Fighting Saints	Ryan Grosulak 5-yard touchdown run, 2-point Tyler Emmert Pass Failed	12	7
4	1:13	17	89	-	Saint Francis Cougars	Chris Bramell 1-yard touchdown run, 2-point Chris Bramell Pass Failed	12	13
4	0:10	8	59	-	Carroll Fighting Saints	32-yard field goal by Marcus Miller	15	13
"TOP" = time of possession. For other American football terms, see Glossary of American football.							Carroll Fighting Saints	Saint Francis Cougars

== Tournament bracket ==
1st Round; November 20
2	Saint Francis (IN)	53
12	Morningside	3
6	Lindenwood	19
16	Hastings	20
3	Georgetown (KY)	35
14	Trinity International	21
8	McKendree	20
11	MidAmerica Nazarene	21
5	Dickinson State	30
13	Montana Tech	13
7	Mary	14
9	Carroll (MT)	24
1	Sioux Falls	72
15	Tabor	11
4	NW Oklahoma State	0
10	Azusa Pacific	16

Quarterfinals; November 27
2	Saint Francis (IN)	48
16	Hastings	17
3	Georgetown (KY)	46
11	MidAmerica Nazarene	27
5	Dickinson State	17
9	Carroll (MT)	56
1	Sioux Falls	3
10	Azusa Pacific	24

Semifinals; December 4
2	Saint Francis (IN)	12
3	Georgetown (KY)	7
9	Carroll (MT)	14
10	Azusa Pacific	10

Championship; December 18
2	Saint Francis (IN)	13
9	Carroll (MT)	15
