= Gordon DeGraffenreid =

American football coach (1943–2020)

Biographical details
- Born: June 21, 1943; Lake Ozark, Missouri, U.S.
- Died: August 8, 2020 (aged 77); Olathe, Kansas, U.S.

Playing career
- 1962–1964: Missouri Valley
- Positions: Guard, linebacker

Coaching career (HC unless noted)

Football
- ?–1970: Pacific HS (MO)
- 1971–1974: Richmond HS (MO)
- 1978–1990: MidAmerica Nazarene

Women's basketball
- 1975–1977: MidAmerica Nazarene

Track and field
- ?–1970: Pacific HS (MO)
- 1971–1974: Richmond HS (MO)

Cross country
- 1975–?: MidAmerica Nazarene

Head coaching record
- Overall: 44–71 (college football)

Accomplishments and honors

Championships
- 1 HAAC (1985)

Gordon Dean DeGraffenreid (June 21, 1943 – August 8, 2020) was an American athletics coach. He was the first head football coach at MidAmerica Nazarene College—now known as MidAmerica Nazarene University—from 1979 to 1990 and compiled an overall record of 41–53.

DeGraffenreid also coached football and track and field for Pacific High School and Richmond High School.

DeGraffenreid was born on June 21, 1943, in Lake Ozark, Missouri. He attended and played college football for Missouri Valley as a guard and linebacker. He died on August 8, 2020, in Olathe, Kansas.

== Head coaching record ==
=== College football ===
Year	Team	Overall	Conference	Standing	Bowl/playoffs	NAIA D2^{#}
MidAmerica Nazarene Pioneers (NAIA Division II independent) (1979)
1979	MidAmerica Nazarene	3–5				
MidAmerica Nazarene Pioneers (Heart of America Athletic Conference) (1980–1990)
1980	MidAmerica Nazarene	4–7	2–6	7th		
1981	MidAmerica Nazarene	4–6	3–5	6th		
1982	MidAmerica Nazarene	5–5	3–4	T–5th		
1983	MidAmerica Nazarene	5–5	3–4	5th		
1984	MidAmerica Nazarene	5–5	3–4	5th		
1985	MidAmerica Nazarene	7–2	6–1	T–1st		16
1986	MidAmerica Nazarene	4–5	2–5	T–6th		
1987	MidAmerica Nazarene	1–8	1–5	7th		
1988	MidAmerica Nazarene	4–6	2–5	6th		
1989	MidAmerica Nazarene	0–9	0–7	8th		
1990	MidAmerica Nazarene	2–8	1–6	T–7th		
MidAmerica Nazarene:		44–71	26–52			
Total:		44–71				
National championship Conference title Conference division title or championship game berth
