= 2004 NAIA football season =

American college football season

- National Championship: Jim Carroll Stadium; Savannah, TN; December 18, 2004
- Champion: Carroll (MT)
- Player of the Year: Cory Jacquay (running back, Saint Francis (IN))

The 2004 NAIA football season was the component of the 2004 college football season organized by the National Association of Intercollegiate Athletics (NAIA) in the United States. The season's playoffs, known as the NAIA Football National Championship, culminated with the championship game on December 18, at Jim Carroll Stadium in Savannah, Tennessee. The Carroll Fighting Saints defeated the Saint Francis Cougars, 15–13, in the title game to win the program's third consecutive NAIA championship.

== Conference standings ==
2004 Central States Football League standings
	Conf.			Overall
Team	W		L	W		L
No. 9 NW Oklahoma State $^	6	–	0	9	–	2
No. 25 Bacone	5	–	1	7	–	3
Southern Nazarene	4	–	2	6	–	4
Langston	3	–	3	6	–	5
Haskell	2	–	4	4	–	7
Peru State	1	–	5	1	–	9
SAGU	0	–	6	1	–	10
$ – Conference champion; ^ – NAIA playoff participant; Rankings from NAIA Coaches' Poll

2004 Dakota Athletic Conference football standings
	Conf.			Overall
Team	W		L	W		L
No. 6 Dickinson State +^	8	–	1	10	–	2
No. 10 Mary +^	8	–	1	9	–	2
Minot State	6	–	3	6	–	4
Jamestown	5	–	4	5	–	5
Valley City State	5	–	4	5	–	5
Black Hills State	4	–	5	4	–	6
Si Tanka	4	–	5	4	–	6
Dakota State	3	–	6	4	–	6
South Dakota Mines	2	–	7	3	–	7
Mayville State	0	–	9	0	–	10
+ – Conference co-champions; ^ – NAIA playoff participant; Rankings from NAIA Coaches' Poll

2004 Frontier Conference football standings
	Conf.			Overall
Team	W		L	W		L
No. 1 Carroll (MT) +^	6	–	2	12	–	2
No. 13 Montana Tech +^	6	–	2	8	–	4
No. 24 Montana Western +	6	–	2	7	–	4
Montana State–Northern	1	–	7	1	–	10
Rocky Mountain	1	–	7	1	–	10
+ – Conference co-champions; ^ – NAIA playoff participant; Rankings from NAIA Coaches' Poll

2004 Great Plains Athletic Conference football standings
	Conf.			Overall
Team	W		L	W		L
No. 5 Sioux Falls $^	10	–	0	11	–	1
No. 8 Hastings ^	8	–	2	9	–	3
No. 15 Morningside ^	8	–	2	8	–	3
No. 17 Northwestern (IA)	7	–	3	7	–	3
Nebraska Wesleyan	6	–	4	6	–	4
Concordia (NE)	5	–	5	5	–	5
Midland Lutheran	4	–	6	5	–	6
Briar Cliff	3	–	7	3	–	7
Doane	2	–	8	2	–	8
Dana	1	–	9	2	–	9
Dakota Wesleyan	1	–	9	1	–	10
$ – Conference champion; ^ – NAIA playoff participant; Rankings from NAIA Coaches' Poll

2004 Heart of America Athletic Conference football standings
	Conf.			Overall
Team	W		L	W		L
No. 11 Lindenwood $^	10	–	0	11	–	1
No. 18 Graceland	8	–	2	8	–	2
No. 7 MidAmerica Nazarene ^	8	–	2	10	–	3
William Jewell	5	–	5	5	–	5
Benedictine (KS)	5	–	5	5	–	6
Baker	4	–	6	4	–	6
Evangel	4	–	6	4	–	6
Missouri Valley	4	–	6	4	–	6
Central Methodist	3	–	7	4	–	7
Culver–Stockton	2	–	8	2	–	8
Avila	2	–	8	2	–	9
$ – Conference champion; ^ – NAIA playoff participant; Rankings from NAIA Coaches' Poll

2004 Kansas Collegiate Athletic Conference football standings
	Conf.			Overall
Team	W		L	W		L
No. 19 Tabor $^	8	–	1	9	–	2
Friends	5	–	4	5	–	4
Kansas Wesleyan	5	–	4	5	–	5
Southwestern (KS)	5	–	4	5	–	5
Sterling	5	–	4	5	–	5
Bethel (KS)	4	–	5	4	–	5
McPherson	4	–	5	4	–	6
Bethany (KS)	3	–	6	3	–	6
Saint Mary (KS)	3	–	6	3	–	6
Ottawa	3	–	6	3	–	7
$ – Conference champion; ^ – NAIA playoff participant; Rankings from NAIA Coaches' Poll

2004 Mid-South Conference football standings
	Conf.			Overall
Team	W		L	W		L
No. 3 Georgetown (KY) $^	10	–	0	12	–	1
No. 23 Pikeville	8	–	2	8	–	3
No. 16 Cumberland (KY)	7	–	3	8	–	3
Lambuth	6	–	4	6	–	4
Campbellsville	5	–	5	6	–	5
Bethel (TN)	5	–	5	5	–	7
Kentucky Wesleyan	4	–	6	4	–	7
Union (KY)	4	–	6	4	–	7
Belhaven	3	–	7	4	–	7
Virginia–Wise	3	–	7	3	–	8
Cumberland (TN)	0	–	10	0	–	10
$ – Conference champion; ^ – NAIA playoff participant; Rankings from NAIA Coaches' Poll

2004 Mid-States Football Association standings
	Conf.			Overall
Team	W		L	W		L
Mideast League
No. 2 St. Francis (IN) x^	7	–	0	13	–	1
No. 21 Walsh	6	–	1	8	–	3
Urbana	5	–	2	5	–	6
Geneva	4	–	3	5	–	5
Malone	2	–	5	4	–	6
Quincy	2	–	5	4	–	7
Taylor	2	–	5	2	–	8
Ohio Dominican	0	–	7	0	–	10
Midwest League
No. 12 McKendree x^	7	–	0	9	–	2
No. 14 Trinity International ^	5	–	2	8	–	3
No. 22 Saint Xavier	5	–	2	7	–	4
No. 19 St. Ambrose	4	–	3	7	–	3
Olivet Nazarene	4	–	3	7	–	5
William Penn	2	–	5	3	–	8
Iowa Wesleyan	1	–	6	2	–	9
St. Francis (IL)	0	–	7	1	–	10
x – League champion/co-champions ^ – NAIA playoff participant; Rankings from NAIA Coaches' Poll

2004 NAIA independents football records
	Conf.			Overall
Team	W		L	W		L
No. 4 Azusa Pacific ^		–		11	–	3
Edward Waters		–		7	–	3
Eastern Oregon		–		6	–	4
Texas College		–		5	–	6
Webber International		–		4	–	5
Southern Oregon		–		3	–	6
Waldorf		–		3	–	7
Allen		–		2	–	6
Paul Quinn		–		1	–	7
Southern Virginia		–		0	–	8
^ – NAIA playoff participant; Rankings from NAIA Coaches' Poll
