= Butte Central Catholic High School =

Private, coeducational school in Butte, Montana, United States

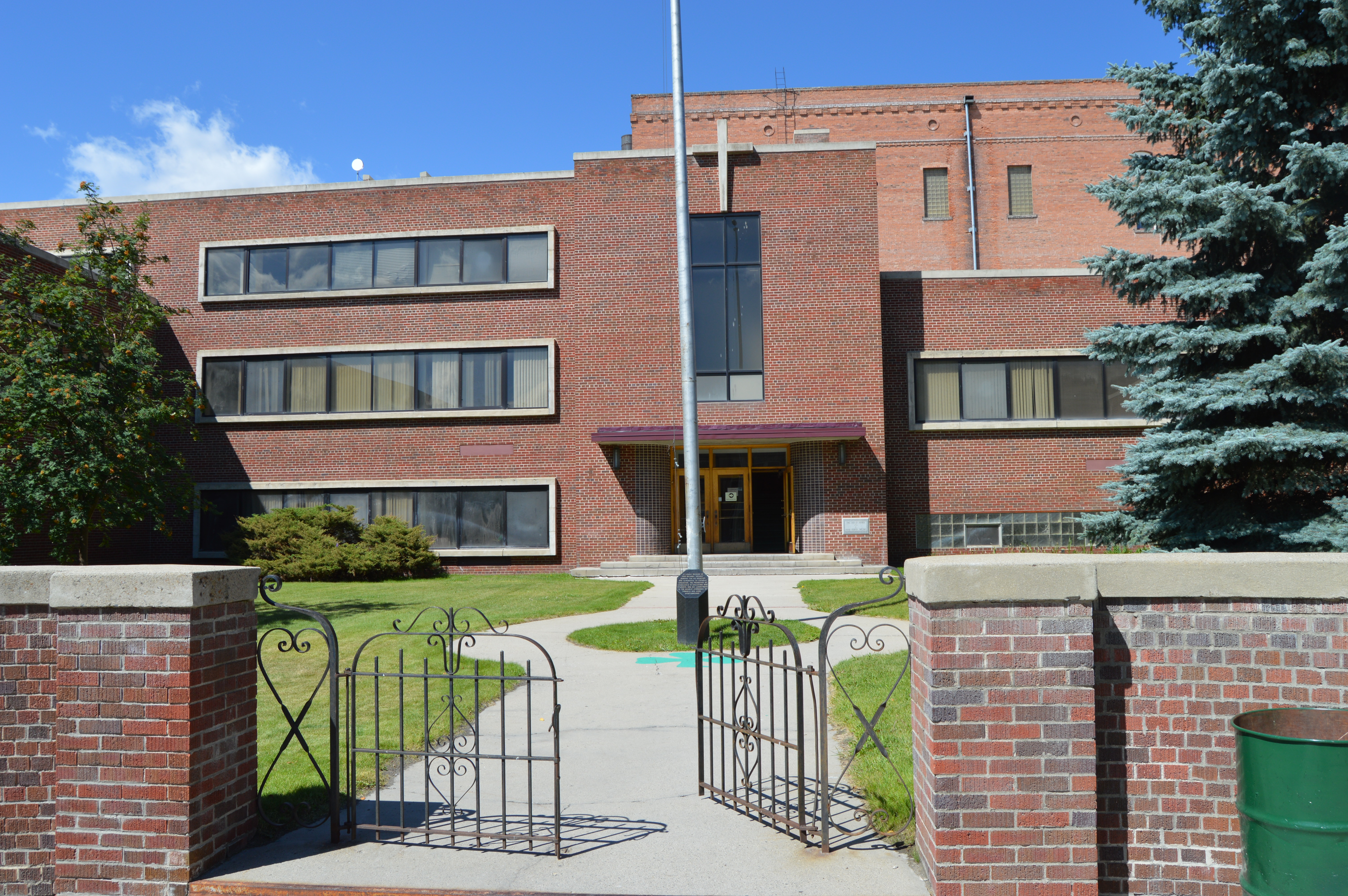

Location
- 9 South Idaho Street; Butte, (Silver Bow County), Montana 59701; United States; 46°0′44″N 112°32′28″W

Information
- Type: Private, Coeducational
- Religious affiliation: Roman Catholic
- Established: 1892
- Superintendent: Timothy Uhl
- Principal: J. P. Williams
- Teaching staff: 30
- Grades: 9–12
- Enrollment: 132 (2007–2008)
- Student to teacher ratio: 15:1
- Colors: Maroon and White
- Slogan: Where Faith and Science Meet
- Fight song: "Notre Dame Victory March"
- Athletics: Go BC
- Athletics conference: Montana Southwest A
- Team name: Maroons
- Accreditation: Northwest Accreditation Commission
- USNWR ranking: A
- Affiliation: Roman Catholic Diocese of Helena
- Website: Official school website

Butte Central Catholic High School is a private, Roman Catholic high school in Butte, Montana. It is one of two high schools in the Roman Catholic Diocese of Helena, the other being Loyola Sacred Heart in Missoula. Their mascot is the Maroons.

== Montana High School Association State Championships ==
List of state championships attained by the school:

- Boys Basketball – 1950, 1956, 1978, 1984, 1992, 2020, 2022
- Boys Football – 1945, 1948, 1952, 1969, 1971, 1972, 1973
- Boys Swimming – 1996, 2003
- Boys Golf – 1978, 1989
- Boys Cross Country – 1968, 1971, 1972, 1973, 1980
- Boys Track and Field – 1982
- Boys Wrestling – 1983
- Girls Basketball – 1981, 1982, 2011, 2016
- Girls Softball – 1997, 1999, 2000
- Girls Track and Field – 1981, 1982, 1983

== Notable alumni and faculty ==
- Amanda Curtis, math and physics teacher from 2004 to 2006, member of Montana House of Representatives, Democratic candidate for U.S. Senate in 2014
- Rob "Robbie" Johnson, MLB catcher for Seattle Mariners, San Diego Padres, New York Mets, and St. Louis Cardinals, graduated 2001
- Jerry J. O'Connell, former member of United States House of Representatives
- Robert O'Neill, decorated Navy SEAL; revealed in November 2014 to be Navy SEAL who killed Osama bin Laden during raid on Bin Laden's compound in Pakistan on May 1, 2011
- Jim Sweeney, college and pro football coach, head coach at Washington State, Montana State and Fresno State, class of 1947
- George Leo Thomas, Bishop of the Diocese of Helena
- Brian Morris, Stanford University football player, Montana Supreme Court Judge
