= 2010 NAIA football season =

American college football season

- National Championship: Barron Stadium; Rome, GA; December 18, 2010
- Champion: Carroll (MT)
- Player of the Year: Jon Ryan (wide receiver, Sioux Falls)

The 2010 NAIA football season was the component of the 2010 college football season organized by the National Association of Intercollegiate Athletics (NAIA) in the United States. The season's playoffs, known as the NAIA Football National Championship, culminated with the championship game on December 18, at Barron Stadium in Rome, Georgia. The Carroll Fighting Saints defeated the Sioux Falls Cougars, 10–7, in the title game to win the program's sixth NAIA championship.

== Conference standings ==
2010 Central States Football League standings
	Conf.			Overall
Team	W		L	W		L
No. 15 NW Oklahoma State $^	5	–	0	8	–	3
No. 24 Southern Nazarene	4	–	1	7	–	4
Langston	3	–	2	6	–	4
Bacone	2	–	3	3	–	8
Texas College	1	–	4	1	–	9
SAGU	0	–	5	2	–	8
$ – Conference champion; ^ – NAIA playoff participant; Rankings from NAIA Coaches' Poll

2010 Dakota Athletic Conference football standings
	Conf.			Overall
Team	W		L	W		L
No. 10 Dickinson State $^	7	–	1	9	–	2
No. 20 South Dakota Mines	6	–	2	7	–	3
Minot State	6	–	2	6	–	4
Black Hills State	5	–	3	6	–	4
Jamestown	4	–	4	5	–	5
Valley City State	3	–	5	4	–	6
Mayville State	1	–	7	2	–	8
Dakota State	0	–	8	0	–	10
$ – Conference champion; ^ – NAIA playoff participant; Rankings from NAIA Coaches' Poll

2010 Frontier Conference football standings
	Conf.			Overall
Team	W		L	W		L
No. 1 Carroll (MT) $^	10	–	0	14	–	0
Rocky Mountain	6	–	4	6	–	5
Eastern Oregon	5	–	5	5	–	6
Montana Tech	5	–	5	5	–	6
Montana State–Northern	3	–	7	3	–	7
Montana Western	1	–	9	1	–	10
$ – Conference champion; ^ – NAIA playoff participant; Rankings from NAIA Coaches' Poll

2010 Great Plains Athletic Conference football standings
	Conf.			Overall
Team	W		L	W		L
No. 2 Sioux Falls $^	10	–	0	13	–	1
No. 6 Morningside ^	9	–	1	10	–	2
No. 18 Northwestern (IA)	8	–	2	8	–	2
No. 21 Midland	7	–	3	8	–	3
Dakota Wesleyan	5	–	5	5	–	5
Hastings	5	–	5	5	–	5
Nebraska Wesleyan	4	–	6	4	–	6
Concordia (NE)	3	–	7	4	–	7
Doane	3	–	7	3	–	7
Briar Cliff	1	–	9	2	–	9
Dordt	0	–	10	0	–	10
$ – Conference champion; ^ – NAIA playoff participant; Rankings from NAIA Coaches' Poll

2010 Heart of America Athletic Conference football standings
	Conf.			Overall
Team	W		L	W		L
No. 4 MidAmerica Nazarene $^	10	–	0	12	–	1
No. 9 Lindenwood ^	9	–	1	9	–	2
No. 17 Missouri Valley	8	–	2	8	–	2
Baker	7	–	3	7	–	4
Benedictine (KS)	6	–	4	7	–	4
Evangel	4	–	6	4	–	6
William Jewell	4	–	6	4	–	7
Central Methodist	3	–	7	3	–	7
Avila	2	–	8	2	–	8
Culver–Stockton	1	–	9	1	–	10
Graceland	1	–	9	1	–	10
$ – Conference champion; ^ – NAIA playoff participant; Rankings from NAIA Coaches' Poll

2010 Kansas Collegiate Athletic Conference football standings
	Conf.			Overall
Team	W		L	W		L
No. 11 McPherson $^	9	–	0	10	–	1
No. 13 Ottawa ^	8	–	1	9	–	2
No. 22 Kansas Wesleyan	6	–	3	7	–	3
Sterling	6	–	3	7	–	3
Friends	5	–	4	6	–	4
Tabor	4	–	5	4	–	6
Bethany (KS)	3	–	6	4	–	6
Saint Mary (KS)	2	–	7	2	–	8
Southwestern (KS)	2	–	7	2	–	8
Bethel (KS)	0	–	9	0	–	10
$ – Conference champion; ^ – NAIA playoff participant; Rankings from NAIA Coaches' Poll

2010 Mid-South Conference football standings
	Conf.			Overall
Team	W		L	W		L
East Division
No. 14 Georgetown (KY) x^	6	–	0	8	–	3
Campbellsville	5	–	1	7	–	5
Lindsey Wilson	4	–	2	5	–	6
Virginia–Wise	3	–	3	3	–	8
Pikeville	2	–	4	2	–	8
West Virginia Tech	1	–	5	2	–	9
Kentucky Christian	0	–	6	0	–	11
West Division
No. 19 Cumberlands (KY) x^	5	–	1	7	–	4
No. 23 Cumberland (TN)	4	–	2	8	–	3
Union (KY)	4	–	2	7	–	4
Bethel (TN)	3	–	3	5	–	5
Shorter	2	–	4	5	–	6
Faulkner	2	–	4	3	–	7
Belhaven	1	–	5	4	–	7
x – Division champion/co-champions; ^ – NAIA playoff participant; Rankings from NAIA Coaches' Poll

2010 Mid-States Football Association standings
	Conf.			Overall
Team	W		L	W		L
Mideast League
No. 3 Saint Xavier x^	7	–	0	13	–	1
No. 5 Saint Francis (IN) ^	6	–	1	10	–	2
No. 7 Marian (IN) ^	5	–	2	10	–	3
Taylor	4	–	3	6	–	5
Walsh	3	–	4	7	–	4
Malone	2	–	5	3	–	7
Trinity International	1	–	6	3	–	8
Olivet Nazarene	0	–	7	0	–	11
Midwest League
No. 12 William Penn x	6	–	1	10	–	1
No. 8 McKendree x^	6	–	1	9	–	3
St. Francis (IL)	5	–	2	7	–	4
Grand View	4	–	3	6	–	4
St. Ambrose	3	–	4	5	–	5
Iowa Wesleyan	3	–	4	3	–	8
Waldorf	1	–	6	3	–	8
Quincy	0	–	7	0	–	11
x – League champion/co-champions ^ – NAIA playoff participant; Rankings from NAIA Coaches' Poll

2010 NAIA independents football records
	Conf.			Overall
Team	W		L	W		L
No. 15 Azusa Pacific ^		–		7	–	3
No. 25 Webber International		–		7	–	4
Menlo		–		4	–	7
Peru State		–		4	–	7
Southern Oregon		–		3	–	7
Southern Virginia		–		3	–	7
Haskell		–		1	–	9
Edward Waters		–		0	–	8
^ – NAIA playoff participant; Rankings from NAIA Coaches' Poll
