= Carroll Fighting Saints football =

Football team for Carroll College

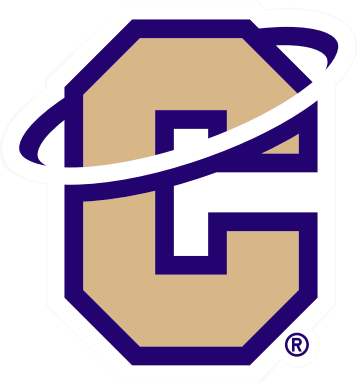
- First season: 1920; 106 years ago
- Athletic director: Charlie Gross
- Head coach: Troy Purcell; 7th season, 46–22 (.676)
- Location: Helena, Montana
- Stadium: Nelson Stadium (capacity: 7,000)
- Conference: Frontier Conference
- Colors: Purple and gold
- All-time record: 428–244–16 (.634)

NAIA national championships
- 2002, 2003, 2004, 2005, 2007, 2010

Conference championships
- 43
- Mascot: Fighting Saints (Halo)
- Website: carrollathletics.com/football

The Carroll Fighting Saint football program represents Carroll College of Helena, Montana, in college football. The team competes in the Frontier Conference, which is affiliated with the National Association of Intercollegiate Athletics (NAIA). The Carroll Fighting Saints football team began playing in 1920 and is one of the most successful programs in the NAIA division of college football.

The team is currently coached by Troy Purcell who is in his fifth season at Carroll. The Carroll College Fighting Saints play their home games on campus at Nelson Stadium.

== History ==
The 1931 football team was undefeated, untied, and unscored upon and finished the season as state champions. The Fighting Saints were also the first collegiate coaching home for John Gagliardi, known as the winningest coach in all of college football (regardless of division). Gagliardi coached at Carroll for four years before moving to St. John's University in Minnesota, where he coached them for 60 seasons.

== Notable alumni ==
In addition, the Carroll program has developed many well known talents either as a coach or a player, including the winningest coach in college football history, John Gagliardi, former Detroit Lions tight end, Casey FitzSimmons, and former Louisville head coach, Bobby Petrino. The team is currently coached by Troy Purcell and plays its home games on campus at Nelson Stadium.

== Championships ==
=== National Championship game appearances ===
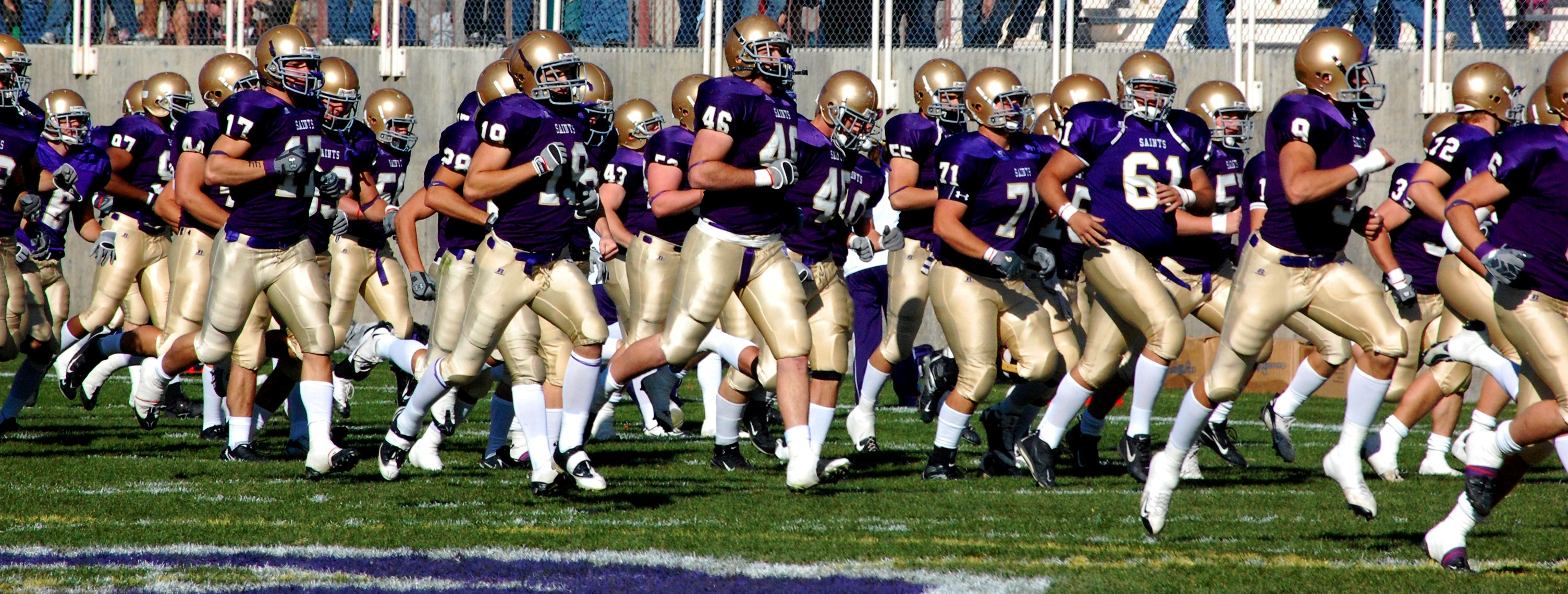
The football team entering the field for a game on October 25, 2008

Year	Coach	Result	Score	Opponent
2002	Mike Van Diest	Won	28–7	Georgetown (KY)
2003	Mike Van Diest	Won	41–28	Northwestern Oklahoma State
2004	Mike Van Diest	Won	15–13	St. Francis (IN)
2005	Mike Van Diest	Won	27–10	St. Francis (IN)
2007	Mike Van Diest	Won	17–9	Sioux Falls
2008	Mike Van Diest	Lost	23–7	Sioux Falls
2010	Mike Van Diest	Won	10–7	Sioux Falls
2011	Mike Van Diest	lost	24–20	St. Xavier

=== Conference championships ===
Year	Conference	Coach	Postseason result
1926	Montana Collegiate Conference	Wilbur Eaton	
1927	Montana Collegiate Conference	Wilbur Eaton	
1928	Montana Collegiate Conference	Wilbur Eaton	
1931	Montana Collegiate Conference	Bill Jones	
1940	Montana Collegiate Conference	Ed Simonich	
1941	Montana Collegiate Conference	Ed Simonich	
1950	Montana Collegiate Conference	John Gagliardi	
1951	Montana Collegiate Conference	John Gagliardi	
1952	Montana Collegiate Conference	John Gagliardi	
1953	Montana Collegiate Conference	Raymond Hunthausen	
1954	Montana Collegiate Conference	Raymond Hunthausen	
1955	Montana Collegiate Conference	Raymond Hunthausen	
1956	Montana Collegiate Conference	Raymond Hunthausen	
1960	Montana Collegiate Conference	John Hunthausen	
1972	Frontier Conference	Bob Petrino Sr.	
1973	Frontier Conference	Bob Petrino Sr.	
1974	Frontier Conference	Bob Petrino Sr.	
1976	Frontier Conference	Bob Petrino Sr.	
1978	Frontier Conference	Bob Petrino Sr.	NAIA Quarterfinal
1980	Frontier Conference	Bob Petrino Sr.	
1981	Frontier Conference	Bob Petrino Sr.	
1982	Frontier Conference	Bob Petrino Sr.	
1985	Frontier Conference	Bob Petrino Sr.	NAIA Semifinal
1986	Frontier Conference	Bob Petrino Sr.	NAIA Semifinal
1987	Frontier Conference	Bob Petrino Sr.	NAIA First Round
1988	Frontier Conference	Bob Petrino Sr.	NAIA Semifinal
1989	Frontier Conference	Bob Petrino Sr.	NAIA First Round
1990	Frontier Conference	Bob Petrino Sr.	
1993	Frontier Conference	Bob Petrino Sr.	NAIA First Round
2000	Frontier Conference	Mike Van Diest	NAIA Semifinal
2001	Frontier Conference	Mike Van Diest	NAIA Semifinal
2002	Frontier Conference	Mike Van Diest	NAIA National Champion
2003	Frontier Conference	Mike Van Diest	NAIA National Champion
2004	Frontier Conference	Mike Van Diest	NAIA National Champion
2005	Frontier Conference	Mike Van Diest	NAIA National Champion
2006	Frontier Conference	Mike Van Diest	NAIA Quarterfinal
2007	Frontier Conference	Mike Van Diest	NAIA National Champion
2008	Frontier Conference	Mike Van Diest	NAIA Finalist
2009	Frontier Conference	Mike Van Diest	NAIA Semifinal
2010	Frontier Conference	Mike Van Diest	NAIA National Champion
2011	Frontier Conference	Mike Van Diest	NAIA Final
2013	Frontier Conference	Mike Van Diest	NAIA Semifinal
2014	Frontier Conference	Mike Van Diest	NAIA Quarterfinal
2021	Frontier Conference	Troy Purcell	NAIA First Round
