= MidAmerica Nazarene Pioneers =

Athletic teams representing MidAmerica Nazarene University

- University: MidAmerica Nazarene University
- Conference: HAAC (primary)
- NAIA: Region IV
- Athletic director: Todd Garrett
- Location: Olathe, Kansas
- Varsity teams: 18
- Football stadium: Olathe District Activities Center
- Basketball arena: Bell Family Arena
- Baseball stadium: Robbie Jones Field at Dixon Stadium
- Mascot: Pioneer Pete
- Colors: Blue, white, and red
- Website: mnusports.com

The MidAmerica Nazarene Pioneers are the athletic teams that represent MidAmerica Nazarene University, located in Olathe, Kansas, in intercollegiate sports as a member of the National Association of Intercollegiate Athletics (NAIA), primarily competing in the Heart of America Athletic Conference (HAAC) since the 1980–81 academic year.

== Varsity teams ==
MidAmerica Nazarene (MNU) competes in 18 intercollegiate varsity sports: Men's sports include baseball, basketball, cross country, football, golf, soccer and track & field (indoor and outdoor); while women's sports include basketball, cross country, golf, soccer, softball, track & field (indoor and outdoor) and volleyball; and co-ed sports include cheerleading, and weightlifting.

== National championships ==
=== Team ===
| Sport | Association | Division | Year | Opponent/Runner-up | Score |
|---|---|---|---|---|---|
| Men's soccer (1) | NAIA | Single | 2023 | Milligan | 2–1 |

== Individual programs ==
=== Football ===
See 2012 Heart of America Athletic Conference football season

The current head football coach is Paul Hansen, who started with the Pioneers in the 2021 season.

College football began at MidAmerica Nazarene in 1979 under head coach Gordon DeGraffenreid. The program has managed 17 post-season appearances in various bowl games and national championship playoff games.

=== Men's basketball ===
The Pioneers are coached by Adam Hepker ('08), who took over the team after Rocky Lamar. Under the leadership of head coach Rocky Lamar, the MNU Pioneers have become one of the NAIA's most competitive programs. Highlighted by the Pioneers 2007 NAIA Division II Championship, Coach Lamar's teams consistently finish at or near the top of the Heart of America Athletic Conference year in and year out.
