= Jim Carroll Stadium =

Stadium in Savannah, Tennessee, US

Coordinates: 35.209660°N 88.247552°W

- Interactive map of Jim Carroll Stadium
- Location: Savannah, Tennessee
- Capacity: 5,000

Tenant
- NAIA Football National Championship (1996–2007)

Jim Carroll Stadium is a stadium in Savannah, Tennessee. It is primarily used for American football as the home of the Hardin County High School Tigers and hosted the NAIA Football National Championship title game from 1996 to 2007. It has a seating capacity of 5,000 people.
