= Saint Francis Cougars football =

- First season: 1998; 28 years ago
- Head coach: Adam Sherman; 1st season, 10–3 (.769)
- Location: Fort Wayne, Indiana
- Stadium: Bishop John M. D'Arcy Stadium (capacity: 3,500)
- Conference: Mid-States Football Association
- Colors
- All-time record: 250–75 (.769)

NAIA national championships
- 2016, 2017

Conference division championships
- 15
- Rivalries: Marian (IN) (rivalry)
- Website: saintfranciscougars.com/football

The Saint Francis Cougars football program represents the University of Saint Francis in college football. The team competes in the Mideast League (MEL) of the Mid-States Football Association (MSFA), which is affiliated with the National Association of Intercollegiate Athletics (NAIA). Adam Sherman is the current head coach. Kevin Donley served as head coach from the inception of the program in 1998 through the 2024 season. Saint Francis plays its home game at Bishop John M. D'Arcy Stadium in Fort Wayne, Indiana.

Under Donley, the Saint Francis won consecutive NAIA Football National Championship in 2016 and 2017. The Cougars have won the MSFA's Mideast League 15 times and have made 21 appearances in the NAIA playoffs.

== Season-by-season record ==
Year	Team	Overall	Conference	Standing	Bowl/playoffs	NAIA^{#}
Saint Francis Cougars (Mid-States Football Association) (1998–present)
1998	Saint Francis	2–8	1–5	7th (MEL)		
1999	Saint Francis	8–3	6–0	1st (MEL)	L NAIA First Round	12
2000	Saint Francis	10–2	6–0	1st (MEL)	L NAIA Quarterfinal	6
2001	Saint Francis	9–2	5–1	T–1st (MEL)	L NAIA First Round	14
2002	Saint Francis	11–1	6–0	1st (MEL)	L NAIA Quarterfinal	8
2003	Saint Francis	12–1	6–0	1st (MEL)	L NAIA Semifinal	4
2004	Saint Francis	13–1	7–0	1st (MEL)	L NAIA Championship	2
2005	Saint Francis	13–1	7–0	1st (MEL)	L NAIA Championship	2
2006	Saint Francis	13–1	6–0	1st (MEL)	L NAIA Championship	2
2007	Saint Francis	11–2	6–1	2nd (MEL)	L NAIA Semifinal	4
2008	Saint Francis	12–1	6–0	1st (MEL)	L NAIA Semifinal	4
2009	Saint Francis	7–3	5–2	T–2nd (MEL)		17
2010	Saint Francis	10–2	6–1	2nd (MEL)	L NAIA Quarterfinal	5
2011	Saint Francis	9–3	3–2	3rd (MEL)	L NAIA Quarterfinal	7
2012	Saint Francis	9–3	4–1	T–1st (MEL)	L NAIA Quarterfinal	6
2013	Saint Francis	9–3	5–1	1st (MEL)	L NAIA Quarterfinal	6
2014	Saint Francis	6–5	4–2	3rd (MEL)		
2015	Saint Francis	11–1	6–0	1st (MEL)	L NAIA Semifinal	4
2016	Saint Francis	13–1	5–1	2nd (MEL)	W NAIA Championship	1
2017	Saint Francis	14–0	6–0	1st (MEL)	W NAIA Championship	1
2018	Saint Francis	10–3	4–2	3rd (MEL)	L NAIA Semifinal	3
2019	Saint Francis	7–3	4–2	T–2nd (MEL)	L NAIA First Round	11
2020	Saint Francis	2–2	2–2	3rd (MEL)		17
2021	Saint Francis	3–6	2–5	6th (MEL)		
2022	Saint Francis	4–6	2–6	7th (MEL)		
2023	Saint Francis	6–4	5–2	3rd (MEL)		
2024	Saint Francis	8–4	4–1	T–1st (MEL)	L NAIA First Round	23
2025	Saint Francis	10–3	4–1	T–1st (MEL)	L NAIA Second Round	16
Saint Francis:		250–75	133–38			
Total:		250–75				
National championship Conference title Conference division title or championship game berth
^{#}Rankings from NAIA Coaches' Poll.

== Program statistics ==
Statistic	Saint Francis	[Opponents]
Games played	271	
Wins	220	51
Ties	0	
Wins in championship game appearances	2	3
Home wins	123	28
Road wins	95	20
Neutral site wins	2	3
Home regular season wins	96	15
Road regular season wins	91	19
Home playoff wins	27	13
Road playoff wins	4	1
Neutral site playoff wins	2	3
Most consecutive wins	27 (2016–2018)	7 (1998)
Most consecutive regular season wins	54 (2001–2007)	7 (1998)
Most consecutive playoff wins	10 (2016–2018)	2 (2000–2001) (2018–present)
Most consecutive home wins	56 (2002–2009)	3 (1998)
Most consecutive road/neutral wins	20 (2015–2018)	4 (1998)
Most points scored in a game by one team	84 (2000 - USF 84, Iowa Wesleyan 9)	71 (1998 - Tri-State 71, USF 27)
Most points scored in a game by one team in a loss	41 (1998 - Walsh 44, USF 41)	42 (2015 - USF 48, Taylor 42) (2015 - USF 45, Marian 42)
Fewest points scored in a game by one team in a win	12 (2004 - USF 12, Georgetown 7)	7 (2018 – Concordia 7, USF 3)
Fewest points scored in a regular season game by one team	3 (2018 – Concordia 7, USF 3)	0 (Done 13 times, most recently in 2017)
Fewest points scored in a playoff game by one team	0 (1999 - Georgetown 38, USF 0) (2002 - Georgetown 24, USF 0)	3 (Done 5 times, most recently in 2018)
Most points scored in a game by both teams	98 (1998 - Tri-State 71, USF 27) (2002 - USF 77, Quincy 21) (2007 - USF 69, Taylor 29)	
Fewest points scored in a game by both teams	10 (2018 – Concordia 7, USF 3)	
Largest margin of victory	75 (2000 - USF 84, Iowa Wesleyan 9)	44 (1998 - Tri-State 71, USF 27)
