= Kevin Donley =

American football player and coach (born 1951)

Biographical details
- Born: July 4, 1951 (age 75); Springfield, Ohio, U.S.

Playing career
- 1969–1972: Anderson (IN)
- Positions: Linebacker, fullback

Coaching career (HC unless noted)
- 1973–1975: Washington HS (IN)
- 1976: Anderson (IN) (LB/DL)
- 1977: Anderson (IN) (DC)
- 1978–1981: Anderson (IN)
- 1982–1992: Georgetown (KY)
- 1993–1996: California (PA)
- 1997–2024: Saint Francis (IN)

Head coaching record
- Overall: 356–157–1 (college); 25–5 (high school)
- Tournaments: 38–23 (NAIA playoffs)

Accomplishments and honors

Championships
- 1 NAIA Division II (1991); 2 NAIA (2016–2017); 2 Hoosier–Buckeye (1980–1981); 5 Mid-South Conference (1987, 1989–1992); 13 MSFA Mideast (1999–2006, 2008, 2012–2013, 2015, 2017)

Awards
- NAIA Division II Coach of the Year (1991); 3× NAIA Coach of the Year (2004, 2016, 2017)

William Kevin Donley (born July 4, 1951) is an American former college football coach. He served as the head football coach at Anderson University in Anderson, Indiana from 1978 to 1981, Georgetown College in Georgetown, Kentucky from 1982 to 1992, California University of Pennsylvania from 1993 to 1996, and the University of Saint Francis in Fort Wayne, Indiana from the program's inception in 1997 through the 2024 season.

Donley holds the record for most wins by a National Association of Intercollegiate Athletics (NAIA) football coach. His 2016 and 2017 Saint Francis Cougars football teams won back-to-back NAIA championships, and his 1991 Georgetown Tigers team won the NAIA Division II Football National Championship. In addition to the 2016 and 2017 championships, Donley led Saint Francis to three consecutive NAIA title game appearances from 2004 to 2006. Donley has been named ACFA National Coach of the Year four times, after each of his three national championship seasons, and once more after the 2004 season. when his team also appeared in the championship game. For his coaching achievements, Donley has been inducted into several local, state and national halls of fame.

== Early life and playing career ==
Donley is a native of Springfield, Ohio where he graduated from Shawnee High School in 1969. His playing career continued in college as a linebacker and fullback at Anderson College.

== Coaching career ==
Donley served three seasons as the head football coach for Washington High School and amassed an overall record of 25–5.

=== Anderson (IN) ===
After graduating from Anderson University in 1973 with a bachelor's degree in physical education, Donley returned to his alma mater in 1976 to serve as the linebackers coach and defensive line coach. After one season he was promoted to defensive coordinator. In 1978, at the age of 26, Donley was named the youngest head football coach in the country. Over the next four years, Donley's teams compiled an overall record of 28–9 (.757), winning the conference title in 1980 and 1981. Through the 2017 season, which marked 71 years of Anderson Ravens football, Donley's winning percentage stands as the best among all head coaches in program history. In 1980, Donley earned a master's degree in education from Ball State University.

=== Georgetown (KY) ===
Donley joined the Georgetown College staff as head coach in 1982. The high point of his tenure there came in 1991 when the Tigers went 13–1 and won the NAIA Division II Football National Championship. In the 14 games that season, the Tigers scored 744 points, among the most of all college football teams at all levels of play. For his team's achievements, Donley earned his first NAIA National Coach of the Year award.

=== California (PA) ===
Donley served as the head coach at California University of Pennsylvania from 1993 to 1996. In four seasons, Donley's teams compiled an uncharacteristic record of 11–33.

=== Saint Francis (IN) ===
In 1997, Donley became the first head football coach at the University of Saint Francis. After a year of preparation, the Cougars began play in the 1998 season. In his first campaign, Donley led Saint Francis to a record of 2–8, their only losing season to date. Since 1999, his teams have lost more than three games only one time, in the 2014 season. Seven of Donley's squads have completed undefeated regular seasons (2002–2006, 2008, 2015), and three consecutive teams finished as national runners-up (2004–2006).

Donley led the Cougars to their first national championship win to end the 2016 season, coming 25 years after his initial championship at Georgetown. He then led the Cougars to their second national championship win in 2017. Their achievement of back-to-back championships was only the fifth time in NAIA football history that this feat has been accomplished. The achievement also resulted in the naming of Donley as national Coach of the Year for both seasons, the third and fourth time he has received this honor. Donley was also named Coach of the Year after his 2004 team appeared in but lost the championship game.

Donley retired from coaching in May 2025, and was succeeded as head football coach at Saint Francis by Adam Sherman.

== Family ==
Donley has two children with Mary Mulford Donley, whom he married at Devington Baptist Church, Indianapolis when he was a senior in college at Anderson University (m. January 7, 1972):. His son, Patrick, served as Co-Offensive Coordinator and his step-son, Joey Didier, served as Co-Defensive Coordinator for Donley's USF football team.

== Awards and honors ==
- 4-time NAIA National Coach of the Year (2017, 2016, 2004, 1991)
- 4-time AFCA Region 2 (NAIA) Coach of the Year (2017, 2016, 2015, 2008)
- NAIA District 32 Coach of the Year (1991)
- 10-time MSFA MEL Conference Coach of the Year (2015, 2013, 2012, 2008, 2006, 2004, 2003, 2002, 2000, 1999)
- 2-time Mid-South Conference Coach of the Year (1991, 1989)
- 2-time Hoosier-Buckeye Conference Coach of the Year (1981, 1980)
- 20 conference titles in 39 seasons of coaching through 2017
- 8 undefeated regular seasons (2017, 2015, 2008, 2002-2006) through 2017
- first coach in MSFA history to reach the 100-win plateau
- Inductee, NAIA Hall of Fame (2014)
- Inductee, University of Saint Francis Athletics Hall of Fame (Class of 2008)
- Inductee, Indiana Football Hall of Fame (2005)
- Inductee, Georgetown College Athletics Hall of Fame (Class of 2004)
- Red coat recipient, Mad Anthonys (2007)

== NAIA career wins leader, milestone wins ==
Donley has more wins than any other NAIA head coach. Donley has attained this record while coaching three different NAIA football programs.

On November 26, 2016, Donley attained a milestone win in his career. With his team's victory in the quarterfinal round of the NAIA playoffs, Donley recorded his 300th victory as a head coach. Donley became only the 13th coach in college football history, at all levels of play, to have reached this plateau.

On November 25, 2017, Donley attained another milestone win. With his team's victory in the quarterfinal round of the NAIA playoffs, Donley recorded his 200th victory as the head coach of the Saint Francis Cougars. This victory came in Donley's 20th season as their coach.

With 326 wins at the end of the 2018 football season, Donley began the 2019 season in 7th place all-time on the college football wins list.

On November 2, 2019, Donley attained milestone victory #332. With his team's conference victory on the road against Lawrence Tech, Donley moved into a 6th place tie for all-time college football wins. The following week, the Cougars defeated Taylor University to give Donley sole possession of the 6th spot.

On October 30, 2021, Donley attained milestone victory #338. This ties Ken Sparks for 5th place all-time on the College football wins list.

On September 10, 2022, Donley took sole possession of 5th place on the all-time wins list passing Ken Sparks with victory #339.

== Head coaching record ==
=== College ===
Year	Team	Overall	Conference	Standing	Bowl/playoffs	NAIA^{#}
Anderson Ravens (Hoosier–Buckeye Conference) (1978–1981)
1978	Anderson	5–4	4–4	T–4th		
1979	Anderson	7–2	6–2	3rd		
1980	Anderson	8–1	7–1	T–1st		
1981	Anderson	8–2	8–0	1st	L NAIA Division II Quarterfinal	
Anderson:		28–9	25–7			
Georgetown Tigers (Heartland Collegiate Conference) (1982)
1982	Georgetown	2–9	1–6	T–7th		
Georgetown Tigers (?) (1983–1986)
1983	Georgetown	7–3	2–3			
1984	Georgetown	4–6	0–2			
1985	Georgetown	4–6	1–2			
1986	Georgetown	6–4	1–2			
Georgetown Tigers (Mid-South Conference) (1987–1992)
1987	Georgetown	8–3	4–2	1st	L NAIA Division II First Round	
1988	Georgetown	7–3	4–1	2nd		
1989	Georgetown	7–3–1	6–0	1st	L NAIA Division II First Round	
1990	Georgetown	9–2	5–0	1st	L NAIA Division II First Round	
1991	Georgetown	13–1	6–0	1st	W NAIA Division II Championship	
1992	Georgetown	8–3	4–1	T–1st	L NAIA Division II First Round	
Georgetown:		75–43–1	34–19			
California Vulcans (Pennsylvania State Athletic Conference) (1993–1996)
1993	California	4–7	2–4	T–5th (West)		
1994	California	2–9	1–5	7th (West)		
1995	California	2–9	1–5	6th (West)		
1996	California	3–8	0–6	7th (West)		
California:		11–33	4–20			
Saint Francis Cougars (Mid-States Football Association) (1998–2024)
1998	Saint Francis	2–8	1–5	7th (MEL)		
1999	Saint Francis	8–3	6–0	1st (MEL)	L NAIA First Round	12
2000	Saint Francis	10–2	6–0	1st (MEL)	L NAIA Quarterfinal	6
2001	Saint Francis	9–2	5–1	T–1st (MEL)	L NAIA First Round	14
2002	Saint Francis	11–1	6–0	1st (MEL)	L NAIA Quarterfinal	8
2003	Saint Francis	12–1	6–0	1st (MEL)	L NAIA Semifinal	4
2004	Saint Francis	13–1	7–0	1st (MEL)	L NAIA Championship	2
2005	Saint Francis	13–1	7–0	1st (MEL)	L NAIA Championship	2
2006	Saint Francis	13–1	6–0	1st (MEL)	L NAIA Championship	2
2007	Saint Francis	11–2	6–1	2nd (MEL)	L NAIA Semifinal	4
2008	Saint Francis	12–1	6–0	1st (MEL)	L NAIA Semifinal	4
2009	Saint Francis	7–3	5–2	T–2nd (MEL)		17
2010	Saint Francis	10–2	6–1	2nd (MEL)	L NAIA Quarterfinal	5
2011	Saint Francis	9–3	3–2	3rd (MEL)	L NAIA Quarterfinal	7
2012	Saint Francis	9–3	4–1	T–1st (MEL)	L NAIA Quarterfinal	6
2013	Saint Francis	9–3	5–1	1st (MEL)	L NAIA Quarterfinal	6
2014	Saint Francis	6–5	4–2	2nd (MEL)		
2015	Saint Francis	11–1	6–0	1st (MEL)	L NAIA Semifinal	4
2016	Saint Francis	13–1	5–1	2nd (MEL)	W NAIA Championship	1
2017	Saint Francis	14–0	6–0	1st (MEL)	W NAIA Championship	1
2018	Saint Francis	10–3	4–2	3rd (MEL)	L NAIA Semifinal	3
2019	Saint Francis	7–3	4–2	T–2nd (MEL)	L NAIA First Round	13
2020–21	Saint Francis	2–2	2–2	3rd (MEL)		17
2021	Saint Francis	3–6	2–5	6th (MEL)		
2022	Saint Francis	4–6	2–6	7th (MEL)		
2023	Saint Francis	6–4	5–2	3rd (MEL)		
2024	Saint Francis	8–4	4–1	T–1st (MWL)	L NAIA First Round	
Saint Francis:		240–72	129–37			
Total:		356–157–1				
National championship Conference title Conference division title or championship game berth
^{#}Rankings from NAIA Coaches' Poll.

== See also ==
- List of college football career coaching wins leaders
- List of college football career coaching losses leaders
