= Keith Barefield =

American football coach

Biographical details
- Education: Evangel (1978)

Playing career
- 1977–1978: Evangel
- Position: Fullback

Coaching career (HC unless noted)
- 1980–1988: Evangel (assistant)
- 1989–1998: Evangel
- 2007–2011: NW Oklahoma State
- 2014–2019: Southeastern (FL)

Administrative career (AD unless noted)
- 2001–2006: Edmonton Eskimos (scout)

Head coaching record
- Overall: 144–66–2
- Tournaments: 4–9 (NAIA playoffs)

Accomplishments and honors

Championships
- 3 HAAC (1993, 1996–1997); 3 CSFL (2007, 2009–2010); 2 TSC (2015–2016); 2 MSC Sun Division (2017–2018)

Keith Barefield is an American former football coach. He served as the head coach at Evangel University in Springfield, Missouri from 1989 to 1998, Northwestern Oklahoma State University in Alva, Oklahoma from 2007 to 2011, and Southeastern University in Lakeland, Florida from 2014 to 2019, compiling a record of career college football coaching record of 144–66–2.

== Head coaching record ==
Year	Team	Overall	Conference	Standing	Bowl/playoffs	NAIA^{#}
Evangel Crusaders (Heart of America Athletic Conference) (1989–1998)
1989	Evangel	3–6	3–4	5th		
1990	Evangel	4–6	3–4	5th		
1991	Evangel	6–4	3–3	4th		
1992	Evangel	7–3	6–2	3rd		
1993	Evangel	8–2	7–1	T–1st	L NAIA Division II First Round	
1994	Evangel	7–3–1	6–2	2nd	L NAIA Division II First Round	
1995	Evangel	6–2–1	6–1–1	2nd		
1996	Evangel	11–1	9–0	1st	L NAIA Division II Semifinal	
1997	Evangel	9–2	8–1	T–1st	L NAIA Quarterfinal	
1998	Evangel	5–4	5–4	T–4th		
Evangel:		66–33–2	56–22–1			
Northwestern Oklahoma State Rangers (Central States Football League) (2007–2011)
2007	Northwestern Oklahoma State	8–4	4–0	1st	L NAIA First Round	18
2008	Northwestern Oklahoma State	7–4	3–1	2nd	L NAIA Quarterfinal	
2009	Northwestern Oklahoma State	7–3	5–0	1st		
2010	Northwestern Oklahoma State	8–3	5–0	1st	L NAIA Quarterfinal	T–15
2011	Northwestern Oklahoma State	4–6	3–2	T–3rd		
Northwestern Oklahoma State:		34–20	20–3			
Southeastern Fire (Sun Conference) (2014–2016)
2014	Southeastern	7–3	3–2	T–2nd		
2015	Southeastern	7–1	5–0	1st		
2016	Southeastern	7–3	5–0	1st	L NAIA First Round	18
Southeastern Fire (Mid-South Conference) (2017–2019)
2017	Southeastern	8–2	5–0	1st (Sun)	L NAIA First Round	10
2018	Southeastern	7–3	5–1	T–1st (Sun)		21
2019	Southeastern	8–1	5–1	2nd (Sun)		14
Southeastern:		44–13	28–4			
Total:		144–66–2				
