= 1999 college football season =

The 1999 college football season may refer to:

- 1999 NCAA Division I-A football season
- 1999 NCAA Division I-AA football season
- 1999 NCAA Division II football season
- 1999 NCAA Division III football season
- 1999 NAIA Football National Championship
