= MSFA =

- Mid-States Football Association
- Minnesota Sports Facilities Authority
- Manipur State Film Awards
  - Manipur State Film Awards 2022
  - Manipur State Film Awards 2023
  - Manipur State Film Awards 2024
  - Manipur State Film Awards 2025
