= Barefield (surname) =

Barefield may refer to:

- Eddie Barefield (1909–1991), American jazz saxophonist, clarinetist and arranger
- John Barefield (born 1955), former American football linebacker
- Keith Barefield, American football coach
- Sedrick Barefield (born 1996), Filipino–American professional basketball player
