= 1999 NAIA football rankings =

Legend
	Increase in ranking
	Decrease in ranking
	Not ranked previous week
*	NAIA National Champion
т	Tied with team above or below also with this symbol

One human poll made up the 1999 National Association of Intercollegiate Athletics (NAIA) football rankings, sometimes called the NAIA Coaches' Poll or the football ratings. Once the regular season was complete, the NAIA sponsored a playoff to determine the year's national champion. It is not known whether a final poll was taken after completion of the 1999 NAIA Football National Championship, won by Northwestern Oklahoma State.

== Poll release dates ==
The poll release dates were:

- August 24, 1999 (Preseason)
- September 7, 1999 (Week 1)
- September 14, 1999 (Week 2)
- September 21, 1999 (Week 3)
- September 28, 1999 (Week 4)
- October 5, 1999 (Week 5)
- October 12, 1999 (Week 6)
- October 19, 1999 (Week 7)
- October 26, 1999 (Week 8)
- November 2, 1999 (Week 9)
- November 9, 1999 (Week 10)
- November 14, 1999 (Final Regular-Season)

== Week by week poll ==
	Week 0-Preseason Aug 24	Week Poll 1 Sep 7	Week Poll 2 Sep 14	Week Poll 3 Sep 21	Week Poll 4 Sep 28	Week Poll 5 Oct 5	Week Poll 6 Oct 12	Week Poll 7 Oct 19	Week Poll 8 Oct 26	Week Poll 9 Nov 2	Week Poll 10 Nov 9	Final Nov 14	
1.	Azusa Pacific (CA)	Azusa Pacific (CA)	Azusa Pacific (CA)	Georgetown (KY)	Georgetown (KY)	Georgetown (KY)	Georgetown (KY)	Georgetown (KY)	Georgetown (KY)	Georgetown (KY)	Georgetown (KY)	Georgetown (KY)	1.
2.	Olivet Nazarene (IL)	Olivet Nazarene (IL)	Malone (OH)	Hastings (NE)	Hastings (NE)	Northwestern Oklahoma State	Northwestern Oklahoma State	Northwestern Oklahoma State	Northwestern Oklahoma State	Northwestern Oklahoma State	Northwestern Oklahoma State	Northwestern Oklahoma State	2.
3.	Benedictine (KS)	Malone (OH)	Georgetown (KY)	Northwestern Oklahoma State	Northwestern Oklahoma State	Hastings (NE)	Hastings (NE)	Hastings (NE)	Hastings (NE)	Hastings (NE)	Hastings (NE)	Hastings (NE)	3.
4.	Malone (OH)	Georgetown (KY)	Benedictine (KS)	Taylor (IN)	Taylor (IN)	Taylor (IN)	Taylor (IN)	Taylor (IN)	McKendree (IL)	McKendree (IL)	Mary (ND)	Mary (ND)	4.
5.	Rocky Mountain (MT)	Benedictine (KS)	Hastings (NE)	Azusa Pacific (CA)	Azusa Pacific (CA)	Azusa Pacific (CA)	Azusa Pacific (CA)	Azusa Pacific (CA)	Azusa Pacific (CA)	Mary (ND)	Southern Oregon	Taylor (IN)	5.
6.	Hastings (NE)	Hastings (NE)	Mary (ND)	Dickinson State (ND)	Malone (OH)	Doane (NE)	McKendree (IL)	McKendree (IL)	Mary (ND)	Southwestern (KS)	Taylor (IN)	McKendree (IL)	6.
7.	Georgetown (KY)	Mary (ND)	Tri-State (IN)	Southwestern (KS)	Doane (NE)	McKendree (IL)	Mary (ND)	Mary (ND)	Dickinson State (ND)	Southern Oregon	Southwestern (KS)	Azusa Pacific (CA)	7.
8.	Mary (ND)	Tri-State (IN)	Northwestern Oklahoma State	Malone (OH)	McKendree (IL)	Mary (ND)	Walsh (OH)	Dickinson State (ND)	Southwestern (KS)	Taylor (IN)	Azusa Pacific (CA)	Dickinson State (ND)	8.
9.	Tri-State (IN)	Northwestern Oklahoma State	Olivet Nazarene (IL)	Doane (NE)	Mary (ND)	MidAmerica Nazarene (KS)	Dickinson State (ND)	Bethany (KS)	Taylor (IN)	Azusa Pacific (CA)	McKendree (IL)	Missouri Valley (MO)	9.
10.	Southwestern (KS)	Taylor (IN)	Taylor (IN)	McKendree (IL)	MidAmerica Nazarene (KS)	Benedictine (KS)	Virginia-Wise	Southwestern (KS)	Missouri Valley (MO)	MidAmerica Nazarene (KS)	Dickinson State (ND)	Rocky Mountain (MT)	10.
11.	Taylor (IN)	Lindenwood (MO)	Lindenwood (MO)	Mary (ND)	Benedictine (KS)	Tri-State (IN)	Bethany (KS)	MidAmerica Nazarene (KS)	Southern Oregon	Dickinson State (ND)	Bethany (KS)	Huron (SD)	11.
12.	Northwestern Oklahoma State	Southwestern (KS)	Southwestern (KS)	Benedictine (KS)	Tri-State (IN)	Valley City State (ND)	Southwestern (KS)	Walsh (OH)	Virginia-Wise	Bethany (KS)	Doane (NE)	Saint Francis (IN)	12.
13.	Lindenwood (MO)	Dickinson State (ND)	Dickinson State (ND)	Tri-State (IN)	Dickinson State (ND)	Dickinson State (ND)	Doane (NE)	Missouri Valley (MO)	Belhaven (MS)	Sioux Falls (SD)	Missouri Valley (MO)	Bethany (KS)	13.
14.	Sioux Falls (SD)	Lambuth (TN)	Doane (NE)	MidAmerica Nazarene (KS)	Huron (SD)	Walsh (OH)	Northwestern (IA)	Southern Oregon	Bethany (KS)	Doane (NE)	Rocky Mountain (MT)	Lambuth (TN)	14.
15.	Huron (SD)	Doane (NE)	McKendree (IL)	Lambuth (TN)	Valley City State (ND)	Virginia-Wise	MidAmerica Nazarene (KS)	Virginia-Wise	Sioux Falls (SD)	Huron (SD)	Huron (SD)	Doane (NE)	15.
16.	Geneva (PA)	Jamestown (ND)	Northwestern (IA)	Huron (SD)	Virginia-Wise	Southwestern (KS)	Missouri Valley (MO)	Belhaven (MS)	Doane (NE)	(T) Missouri Valley (MO)	Lambuth (TN)	Southern Oregon	16.
17.	Dickinson State (ND)	Rocky Mountain (MT)	Lambuth (TN)	Virginia-Wise	Southwestern (KS)	Bethany (KS)	Southern Oregon	Lambuth (TN)	MidAmerica Nazarene (KS)	(T) Rocky Mountain (MT)	Saint Francis (IN)	Southwestern (KS)	17.
18.	Lambuth (TN)	McKendree (IL)	Tiffin (OH)	Southern Oregon	Bethany (KS)	Tiffin (OH)	Tri-State (IN)	Valley City State (ND)	Huron (SD)	(T) Virginia-Wise	Virginia-Wise	Virginia-Wise	18.
19.	Jamestown (ND)	Ottawa (KS)	Ottawa (KS)	Valley City State (ND)	Walsh (OH)	Northwestern (IA)	Belhaven (MS)	Sioux Falls (SD)	Rocky Mountain (MT)	(T) Walsh (OH)	Walsh (OH)	Geneva (PA)	19.
20.	Doane (NE)	Northwestern (IA)	MidAmerica Nazarene (KS)	Lindenwood (MO)	Tiffin (OH)	Missouri Valley (MO)	Lambuth (TN)	Doane (NE)	Walsh (OH)	Belhaven (MS)	Geneva (PA)	Evangel (MO)	20.
21.	Ottawa (KS)	Sioux Falls (SD)	Carroll (MT)	Bethany (KS)	Northwestern (IA)	Malone (OH)	Benedictine (KS)	Huron (SD)	Geneva (PA)	Saint Francis (IN)	Evangel (MO)	Sioux Falls (SD)	21.
22.	Northwestern (IA)	Tiffin (OH)	Concordia (NE)	Montana Tech	Missouri Valley (MO)	Baker (KS)	Valley City State (ND)	Rocky Mountain (MT)	Lindenwood (MO)	Geneva (PA)	MidAmerica Nazarene (KS)	MidAmerica Nazarene (KS)	22.
23.	Campbellsville (KY)	Virginia-Wise	Jamestown (ND)	Walsh (OH)	Baker (KS)	Belhaven (MS)	Evangel (MO)	Tiffin (OH)	Tri-State (IN)	Lambuth (TN)	Sioux Falls (SD)	Valley City State (ND)	23.
24.	McKendree (IL)	MidAmerica Nazarene (KS)	Huron (SD)	Tiffin (OH)	Lambuth (TN)	Montana Tech	Sioux Falls (SD)	Tri-State (IN)	Northwestern (IA)	Tri-State (IN)	Baker (KS)	Walsh (OH)	24.
25.	Montana Tech	Concordia (NE)	Virginia-Wise	Northwestern (IA)	Belhaven (MS)	(T) Lambuth (TN); (T) Southern Oregon	Huron (SD)	Northwestern (IA)	Saint Francis (IN)	Evangel (MO)	Valley City State (ND)	Olivet Nazarene (IL)	25.
	Week 0-Preseason Aug 24	Week Poll 1 Sep 7	Week Poll 2 Sep 14	Week Poll 3 Sep 21	Week Poll 4 Sep 28	Week Poll 5 Oct 5	Week Poll 6 Oct 12	Week Poll 7 Oct 19	Week Poll 8 Oct 26	Week Poll 9 Nov 2	Week Poll 10 Nov 9	Final Nov 14	
		Dropped: Huron (SD); Geneva (PA); Campbellsville (KY); Montana Tech	Dropped: Rocky Mountain (MT); Sioux Falls (SD)	Dropped: Olivet Nazarene (IL); Ottawa (KS); Carroll (MT); Concordia (NE); Jamestown (ND)	Dropped: Southern Oregon; Lindenwood (MO); Montana Tech	Dropped: Huron (SD)	Dropped: Tiffin (OH); Malone (OH); Montana Tech	Dropped: Benedictine (KS); Evangel (MO)	Dropped: Lambuth (TN); Valley City State (ND); Tiffin (OH)	Dropped: Lindenwood (MO); Northwestern (IA)	Dropped: Belhaven (MS); Tri-State (IN)	Dropped: Baker (KS)	

== Leading vote-getters ==
Since the inception of the Coaches' Poll in 1999, the #1 ranking in the various weekly polls has been held by only a select group of teams. Through the postseason poll of the 1999 season, the teams and the number of times they have held the #1 weekly ranking are shown below. The number of times a team has been ranked #1 in the postseason poll (the national champion) is shown in parentheses.

There has been only one tie for the leading vote-getter in a weekly poll. In 2015, Southern Oregon was tied with Marian (IN) in the preseason poll.

In 1999, the results of a postseason poll, if one was conducted, are not known. Therefore, an additional poll has been presumed, and the #1 postseason ranking has been credited to the postseason tournament champion, the Northwestern Oklahoma State Rangers.

Team	Total #1 Rankings
Georgetown (KY)	9
Azusa Pacific (CA)	3
Northwestern Oklahoma State	1 (1)
