= 2016 Saint Francis Cougars football team =

American college football season

2016 Saint Francis Cougars football

NAIA national champion
- Conference: Mid-States Football Association
- Mideast League
- Record: 13–1 (5–1 MSFA (MEL))
- Head coach: Kevin Donley (19th season)
- Offensive coordinator: Patrick Donley, Trevor Miller (13th, 11th season)
- Defensive coordinator: Joey Didier, Eric Wagoner (7th, 9th season)
- Home stadium: Bishop John M. D'Arcy Stadium

2016 Mid-States Football Association standings
	Conf.			Overall
Team	W		L	W		L
Mideast League
No. 5 Marian (IN) x^	6	–	0	11	–	1
No. 1 Saint Francis (IN) ^	5	–	1	13	–	1
Concordia (MI)	4	–	2	7	–	4
Siena Heights	2	–	4	5	–	5
Taylor	2	–	4	4	–	7
Missouri Baptist	2	–	4	3	–	8
Lindenwood–Belleville	0	–	6	0	–	10
Midwest League
No. 15 Robert Morris (IL) x^	5	–	0	7	–	4
Saint Xavier	3	–	2	6	–	4
St. Francis (IL)	2	–	3	5	–	6
Saint Ambrose	2	–	3	4	–	6
Olivet Nazarene	2	–	3	4	–	7
Trinity International	1	–	4	4	–	7
x – League champion/co-champions ^ – NAIA playoff participant; Rankings from NAIA Coaches' Poll

The 2016 Saint Francis Cougars football team represented the University of Saint Francis, located in Fort Wayne, Indiana, in the 2016 NAIA football season. They were led by head coach Kevin Donley, who served his 19th year as the head football coach at Saint Francis. The Cougars played their home games at Bishop John D'Arcy Stadium and were members of the Mid-States Football Association (MSFA) Mideast League (MEL). The Cougars finished 2nd in the MSFA MEL division and received an at-large bid to the NAIA playoffs.

The team went on to win the first football national championship in the school's history. In the 2016 NAIA Football National Championship, the Cougars defeated the Baker Wildcats, 38–17.

Kevin Donley was voted by the American Football Coaches Association as the 2016 NAIA National Coach of the Year. Donley was also granted a five-year contract extension after the 2016 season.

== Schedule ==
(13–1 overall, 5–1 conference)

Date	Time	Opponent	Rank	Site	TV	Result	Attendance	Source
August 27	2:00pm	at Trinity International (IL)*	No. 4	O'Shaughnessy Stadium; Deerfield, IL		W 34–20	523	
September 3	7:00pm	at Olivet Nazarene (IL)*	No. 4	Ward Field; Bourbonnais, IL		W 58–14	1,563	
September 10	12:00pm	Taylor (IN)	No. 4	Bishop D'Arcy Stadium; Fort Wayne, IN		W 37–6	3,277	
September 24	12:00pm	Lindenwood-Belleville (IL)^{†}	No. 3	Bishop D'Arcy Stadium; Fort Wayne, IN		W 63–7	3,591	
October 1	12:00pm	No. 1 Marian (IN)	No. 2	Bishop D'Arcy Stadium; Fort Wayne, IN (Franciscan Bowl)		L 21–35	4,300	
October 8	1:00pm	at No. 29 Siena Heights (MI)	No. 5	O'Laughlin Stadium; Adrian, MI		W 24–22	2,132	
October 15	1:00pm	at No. 26 Concordia (MI)	No. 4	Ferry Field at Cardinal Stadium; Ann Arbor, MI		W 44–6	1,650	
October 22	12:00pm	No. 24 Robert Morris (IL)*	No. 4	Bishop D'Arcy Stadium; Fort Wayne, IN		W 28–21	1,759	
October 29	12:00pm	Missouri Baptist	No. 4	Bishop D'Arcy Stadium; Fort Wayne, IN		W 56–24	1,677	
November 5	12:00pm	at Davenport (MI)*	No. 4	Farmers Insurance Athletic Complex; Caledonia Township, MI		W 35–6	1,213	
November 19	12:00pm	No. 11 Missouri Valley (MO)*	No. 4	Bishop D'Arcy Stadium; Fort Wayne, IN (NAIA First Round)		W 79–20	1,495	
November 26	12:00pm	No. 5 Morningside (IA)*	No. 4	Bishop D'Arcy Stadium; Fort Wayne, IN (NAIA Quarterfinal)		W 42–35	1,579	
December 3	1:30pm	at No. 3 Reinhardt (GA)*	No. 4	Ken White Field; Waleska, GA (NAIA Semifinal)		W 42–24	1,567	
December 17	6:00pm	vs. No. 2 Baker (KS)*	No. 4	Municipal Stadium; Daytona Beach, FL (NAIA Championship)	ESPN3	W 38–17	2,500	
*Non-conference game; ^{†}Homecoming; Rankings from Coaches' Poll released prior to the game; All times are in Eastern time

== Game summaries ==
10/1/2016 - The #2-ranked Cougars played another historic game vs. the #1-ranked Marian Knights, undefeated conference rivals and defending NAIA national champions. Saint Francis matched up well, and they took a 21–14 lead into the half. However, USF's second-half mistakes allowed the Knights to take control of the game, and the Knights prevailed 35–21. This year's game began a new tradition between the two Indiana perennial powers. The regular season contest will now be referred to as the Franciscan Bowl. A traveling trophy will reside with the winner until the next contest. With this year's win, Marian takes a 1–0 lead in the series.

10/8/2016 - The Cougars only fell 3 places to 5th after last week's loss to Marian. This week, Saint Francis traveled to Siena Heights to face another tough conference opponent. The Cougars led 21–10 at the half. However, a strong effort by the Saints defense in the second half made the game close. In the end, Saint Francis returned home with a victory by a score of 24–22.

10/22/2016 - The Cougars returned home after a 2-game road trip to face the 24th-ranked Eagles from Robert Morris University. The match between two Top-25 teams certainly lived up to expectations. Robert Morris took the opening kick-off and scored to take an early 7–0 lead. That score held until just before halftime when the Cougars scored to tie the game. The Cougars took the second half kick-off and scored to take the lead, 14–7, a lead that never would be surrendered. Late in the game, the Cougar defense put up a defining goal line stand. Facing 1st and goal from inside the 1-yard line, The Cougars beat back the Eagles' offense on four consecutive plays to preserve the victory. For their strong performances, each team retained their position in the weekly polls. Saint Francis broke a tie to take 4th place outright, and Robert Morris retained the 24th position in the poll.

11/19/2016 - The game started out as a shoot-out as each team scored on their first 3 possessions, resulting in a 21–20 Saint Francis lead. From that point, it was all USF. The Cougars scored on each of their 7 first-half possessions, taking a 44–20 lead into the half. Their scoring continued into the second half with 35 unanswered points to arrive at the final score of 79–20. The game was played under adverse weather conditions. A clear field was quickly covered with snow at the start of the game, and neither defense was able to react to the potent offenses. Cougar quarterback Nick Ferrer threw for over 350 yards as the Cougars amassed over 600 yards of total offense. Ferrer completed 5 touchdown passes, 3 of them going to Seth Coate, who had over 150 yards of receptions for the game. For their efforts, Ferrer and Coate were named the game's offensive co-MVPs. The defensive MVP award went to Lucas Sparks.

11/26/2016 - With two teams that combined to score 145 points in the first round, this game was expected to be a high-scoring affair. This game matched the #4 Saint Francis Cougars vs the #5 Morningside Mustangs, and the two teams were expected to be evenly matched. The game started with Morningside breaking out to a 20–0 lead. Saint Francis got on the scoreboard in the 2nd quarter, and the halftime lead favored Morningside by that 20–7 score. In the second half, the Cougars finally got their offense rolling, scoring the next 14 points to set the lead at 21–20. Morningside immediately responded with a touchdown of their own. Their two-point try was good, and Morningside regained the lead, 28–21. But Saint Francis scored to tie the game again, 28–28. Then, late in the 4th quarter, Saint Francis took control of the game by scoring the next two touchdowns to generate a 14-point lead, 42–28. Once again, Morningside countered with a quick touchdown, and the gap was closed to the final score of 42–35. Saint Francis controlled the ball at the end of the game to run the Mustangs out of time-outs, and the Cougars advanced to the semifinal round. The USF offense had multiple stars in the contest. For the second straight game, QB Nick Ferrer threw for 5 TD's, 3 of them once again going to Seth Coate. But the offensive Player of the Game was awarded to Justin Green, who ran for 296 yards and 1 TD on 25 carries. The defensive award went to Eric Hemmelgarn. Of special note: The win was a milestone victory for USF head coach Kevin Donley. The win was the 300th victory in his long and illustrious career as the all-time leader in wins in the NAIA division of football. After the game, Donley was presented with an encased football to commemorate the achievement.

12/03/2016 - With the upset loss by #1 Marian last week, USF missed the anticipated rematch with the Knights. Instead, the Cougars hit the road to make the 600 mile road trip to Waleska, GA to face the undefeated and #3 ranked Reinhardt Eagles. The Cougars were the last team to beat Reinhardt, in last season's FCS opening round at Saint Francis. The potent offense of the Eagles proved once again to be a tough challenge to stop. But the Cougars prevailed 42–24 due largely to big plays and turnovers. Highlights of the game include a second half 98-yard touchdown run by Justin Green on the first play after the Cougars had just completed a strong goal line stand to prevent an Eagles first down and likely score; two interceptions on back to back possessions by Saint Francis, the first being a pick-6 touchdown return and the second setting up another quick score by the Cougars; three touchdown runs by Justin Green and two touchdown catches by Seth Coate. A score in the first quarter put the Eagles in front 7–0. But Saint Francis responded quickly to tie the game, and two additional scores led to a 21–7 Saint Francis lead. This was the Eagles' largest deficit of the season and only the third time they had trailed in a ball game all season. The Eagles ended the half by kicking a field goal with zero time on the clock, an untimed down granted due to a pass interference call against USF. Each team scored once in the third quarter to take the score to 28–17. The two interceptions pushed the score to 42–17, and Reinhardt scored once again to create the final margin of victory. The Cougars will be playing in two weeks in the title game for the 4th time in their history, hoping this time to gain their first national championship. The offensive Player of the Game was once again Seth Coate, and the defensive Player of the Game was awarded to Spencer Cowherd.

12/17/2016 - For the first time in team history, the Saint Francis Cougars won their last game of the season. With their 38–17 victory over #2 Baker Wildcats, the Cougars attained their first NAIA football national championship. The win was the second for head coach Kevin Donley, having won a first title 25 years earlier while coaching the Georgetown Tigers.

== Ranking movements ==
Ranking movements Legend: ██ Increase in ranking ██ Decrease in ranking
	Week											
Poll	Pre	1	2	3	4	5	6	7	8	9	10	Final
NAIA Coaches' Poll	4	3	3	2	5	4	4	4	4	4	4	1
