= 2017 college football season =

2017 college football season may refer to:

== American leagues ==
- 2017 NCAA Division I FBS football season
- 2017 NCAA Division I FCS football season
- 2017 NCAA Division II football season
- 2017 NCAA Division III football season
- 2017 NAIA football season

== Non-American leagues ==
- 2017 Japan college football season
- 2017 CIS football season
