= 2017 Saint Francis Cougars football team =

American college football season

2017 Saint Francis Cougars football

NAIA national champion MSFA MEL champion

NAIA Championship, W 24–13 vs. Reinhardt
- Conference: Mid-States Football Association
- Mideast League
- Record: 14–0 (6–0 MSFA MEL)
- Head coach: Kevin Donley (20th season)
- Co-offensive coordinators: Patrick Donley (14th season); Trevor Miller (12th season)
- Co-defensive coordinators: Joey Didier (8th season); Eric Wagoner (10th season)
- Home stadium: Bishop John M. D'Arcy Stadium

2017 Mid-States Football Association standings
	Conf.			Overall
Team	W		L	W		L
Mideast League
No. 1 Saint Francis (IN) x^	6	–	0	14	–	0
No. 15 Concordia (MI) ^	5	–	1	9	–	2
No. 18 Marian (IN)	4	–	2	7	–	3
Siena Heights	3	–	3	5	–	5
Taylor	2	–	4	4	–	6
Missouri Baptist	1	–	5	3	–	8
Lindenwood–Belleville	0	–	6	0	–	10
Midwest League
No. 6 Saint Xavier x^	5	–	0	10	–	2
St. Francis (IL)	4	–	1	5	–	5
Olivet Nazarene	2	–	3	6	–	5
St. Ambrose	2	–	3	4	–	6
Trinity International	1	–	4	2	–	7
Robert Morris (IL)	1	–	4	2	–	9
x – League champion/co-champions ^ – NAIA playoff participant; Rankings from NAIA Coaches' Poll

The 2017 Saint Francis Cougars football team represented the University of Saint Francis, located in Fort Wayne, Indiana, in the 2017 NAIA football season. They were led by head coach Kevin Donley, who served his 20th year as the first and only head coach in the history of Saint Francis football. The Cougars played their home games at Bishop John D'Arcy Stadium and were members of the Mid-States Football Association (MSFA) Mideast League (MEL). The Cougars finished an undefeated regular season as the defending national champions. They finished 1st in the MSFA MEL division and received an automatic bid to the NAIA playoffs.

The 2017 postseason saw the Cougars return to the national championship game. They successfully defended their national title with a 24–13 victory over Reinhardt (GA). The back-to-back championships is a feat that was completed for only the 5th time in NAIA football history. The undefeated season was the first in the Cougars' 20-year history.

== Schedule ==
Date	Time	Opponent	Rank	Site	TV	Result	Attendance	Source
September 2	1:00 p.m.	at Jamestown*	No. 1	Jack Brown Stadium; Jamestown, ND		W 55–7		
September 9	12:00 p.m.	St. Francis (IL)*	No. 1	Bishop D'Arcy Stadium; Fort Wayne, IN		W 68–23	3,697	
September 16	2:00 p.m.	at No. 23 St. Ambrose*	No. 1	Brady Street Stadium; Davenport, IA		W 49–21	2,317	
September 23	6:00 p.m.	No. 11 Saint Xavier*^{†}	No. 1	Bishop D'Arcy Stadium; Fort Wayne, IN		W 48–23	4,013	
September 30	6:00 p.m.	at No. 8 Marian (IN)	No. 1	St. Vincent Health Field; Indianapolis, IN (Franciscan Bowl)		W 31–24	4,500	
October 7	12:00 p.m.	No. 20 Concordia (MI)	No. 1	Bishop D'Arcy Stadium; Fort Wayne, IN		W 35–18	3,887	
October 14	7:00 p.m.	at Siena Heights	No. 1	O'Laughlin Stadium; Adrian, MI		W 36–9	2,143	
October 21	1:00 p.m.	at Missouri Baptist	No. 1	Spartan Field; St. Louis, MO		W 56–23	1,560	
October 28	12:00 p.m.	Lindenwood–Belleville	No. 1	Bishop D'Arcy Stadium; Fort Wayne, IN		W 70–0	2,877	
November 4	12:00 p.m.	Taylor	No. 1	Bishop D'Arcy Stadium; Fort Wayne, IN		W 40–20	3,687	
November 18	6:00 p.m.	No. 15 Benedictine (KS)*	No. 1	Bishop D'Arcy Stadium; Fort Wayne, IN (NAIA First Round)		W 26–21	671	
November 25	12:00 p.m.	No. 10 Northwestern (IA)*	No. 1	Bishop D'Arcy Stadium; Fort Wayne, IN (NAIA Quarterfinal)		W 30–3	3,191	
December 2	12:00 p.m.	No. 3 Morningside*	No. 1	Bishop D'Arcy Stadium; Fort Wayne, IN (NAIA Semifinal)		W 43–36	3,780	
December 16	6:00 p.m.	vs. No. 2 Reinhardt*	No. 1	Municipal Stadium; Daytona Beach, FL (NAIA Championship)	ESPN3	W 24–13	4,432	
*Non-conference game; ^{†}Homecoming; Rankings from NAIA Poll released prior to the game; All times are in Eastern time

== Game summaries ==
9/2/2017 - The #1-ranked Cougars opened their title defense with a road victory over Jamestown (ND). Saint Francis scored the first four times the offense touched the ball on their way to a 55–7 victory.

9/9/2017 - The Cougars returned home to defend their national championship against the like-named St. Francis Fighting Saints. Saint Francis (IN) won the game over St. Francis (IL), 68–23. The Cougars' clicked for 574 yards of total offense, including 301 net passing yards by Nick Ferrer, 120 yards rushing by Justin Green, and 111 receiving yards by Rocky James. Ferrer threw for 5 touchdowns, including 3 to James. Green rushed for 2 touchdowns in a game that also featured a blocked field goal that was returned for a Cougar touchdown. The Cougars took the opening kickoff and marched downfield to score and open a 7–0 lead. The Fighting Saints responded with a field goal to cut the lead to 7–3. But from that point, the home team controlled the game as their lead expanded to 48–9 at the half and 61–9 early in the fourth quarter. With second- and third-team players on the field, the Fighting Saints scored twice in the final quarter. After they returned a pass for 39 yards and a score, they successfully completed an on-side kick. Two plays later, the Saints' quarterback tossed a 49-yard pass to score for the second time in only 36 seconds.

9/16/2017 - The Cougars took to the road for their first game of the season against a ranked opponent. Saint Francis prevailed over St. Ambrose, 49–21, in a game highlighted by a record-setting performance by QB Nick Ferrer. Ferrer threw for six touchdowns to become the all-time leader in career TD passes thrown by a USF quarterback. He finished the game with a career-best 508 yards passing, completing 31 of 43 passes to ten different receivers without throwing an interception. Justin Green added 162 yards rushing to a total offensive effort of 686 yards.

9/23/2017 - A rare football oddity was witnessed by the fans who attended the Saint Francis homecoming game. Three different punt snaps went out of the end zone. The tree safeties gave the Cougars the equivalent of another touchdown, points not needed as the Cougars won the game, 48–23, over the visiting 11th-ranked Cougars from Saint Xavier. The game was never in doubt as Saint Francis raced to a 25–0 lead to start the scoring.

9/30/2017 - The Cougars faced their stiffest challenge this year as they went on the road to visit conference rival Marian University. Marian opened the game with a challenge to the Cougars, scoring on their first 3 possessions to take early leads of 14–0 and 17–3. Each of the Knights' drives included a quick-striking offense, with plays of 45+ yards highlighting each drive. But the Cougar defense steadied itself, holding Marian to 7 points the rest of the way, including a scoreless second half. Saint Francis scored the last points of the game to give them their only lead with less than 7 minutes to play in the final quarter. When the scoreboard finally reached zero, Saint Francis had emerged with a 31–24 victory. The score was tied at 17, and then again at 24 before USF scored the decisive points. The Saint Francis offense tallied 530 yards of total offense, including 403 yards and 3 TDs passing by Nick Ferrer. Ferrer completed 33 of 38 attempts without an interception. Favored targets were Rocky James, with 12 receptions for 163 yards, and Dan Ricksy, with 10 receptions for 146 yards. Justin Green added 138 yards of rushing. The Cougars won the time-of-possession battle, 41 minutes to 19, due in part to the quick strikes of the Marian offense in the first half. With the victory, the Cougars set a new team record for their 14th consecutive victory. The victory also sent the Franciscan Bowl trophy to Fort Wayne for the next year, with the series becoming tied, 1-1.

10/7/2017 - Something had to give. Unbeaten Concordia was visiting unbeaten Saint Francis, and the conference lead was on the line. Concordia brought one of the top defenses, and they brought one of the nation's leading rushers too. The game lived up to expectations as Saint Francis won, 35–18, in a game that was much closer than the final score indicated. Concordia won the total yardage game, 375–367, out-rushing USF 243–157. Concordia's Joe Conner outgained Justin Green, 189–154. USF won the passing, 210–132. Concordia scored first, and the game was back and forth before the Cougars pulled away in the 4th quarter to seal the victory. USF scored 4 touchdowns: 3 by Green rushes, and one via a 46-yard fumble recovery by Ryan Johnson, in addition to 3 field goals. The no passing-TD game ended a streak of consecutive games with 2 or more TD passes by QB Nick Ferrer, who left the game briefly in the second half with a hand injury.

10/14/2017 - The Cougars continued their mid-season playoff-like schedule with their fourth game in a row against a ranked or tough opponent. The Cougars went on the road to face another conference unbeaten, the Siena Heights Saints, winners of their previous four games. It was Homecoming and Senior Night for the Saints. But the Cougars served notice early when Justin Green broke a 57-yard TD run on the first drive of the game. For the night, Green would end up with three scores and 142 net yards rushing. A strong defensive effort by the Cougars contributed to a Saint Francis victory. The final score was 36–9. A steady drizzle made for messy play in the first half, and the Cougars' defense held Siena Heights to a safety earned when the Saints blocked a punt attempt that sent the ball out of the back of the end zone. A halftime lead of 20–2 was expanded to the final score as the Cougars scored two touchdowns and a matching safety of their own.

10/21/2017 - After a series of ranked and tough opponents, the Cougars finally caught a breather with a road trip to St. Louis to meet conference opponent Missouri Baptist. The Cougars looked erratic at times but came away with a victory, by a final score of 56–23. At one point in the first half, Saint Francis led by a single point, 21–20, after Missouri Baptist failed an attempted two-point conversion. The Cougars scored 35 of the final 38 points in the contest. USF quarterback Nick Ferrer threw for six touchdowns to move into first place for career touchdown passes by a quarterback in the MidStates Football Association. In this game, Ferrer completed 33 of 49 passes with one interception and 446 yards. Justin Green rushed for 169 yards as the Cougars accumulated 686 yards of total offense. Ferrer threw pass completions of 27 yards or more to 5 different receivers, with 5 different targets hauling in the 6 touchdown passes. On defense, the Cougars held Mo. Baptist to a net gain of 5 yards rushing on 25 carries, derived from gains of 49 yards offset by rushes resulting in 44 yards of losses.

10/28/2017 - Today's game matched the undefeated and #1-ranked USF Cougars against the winless conference foes from Lindenwood-Belleville. The Cougars boasted the top-ranked offense in the MSFA, and the Lynx brought the worst-ranked defense to town. Also, the Cougars placed their top-ranked defense against the MSFA's worst-rated offense. The outcome was predictable; the only thing in doubt was the final score. In hindsight, the Cougars needed only 13 seconds to settle the matter. Matt Kominkiewicz ran back the opening kickoff for a touchdown and a quick 7–0 lead. When the final seconds had ticked off the clock, USF won with a 70–0 shutout over the visitors. In addition to the opening play, highlights in the game were: 3 touchdown passes by Nick Ferrer, 3 touchdown runs by Justin Green, and 2 pick-6 interceptions returned for a score (the first being a goal-line to goal-line return of 100 yards by Spencer Cowherd, and the second being a 45-yard return by Kaleb Summers). Kominkiewicz also had a 2-touchdown game as he was on the receiving end of a TD pass from Clay Senerius. During the game, Ferrer became #2 on the career yardage list for MSFA quarterbacks. He passed former Cougar QB Jeremy Hibbeln as he became the all-time leader in yardage by a Saint Francis QB.

11/04/2017 - Today was Senior Day for the class of 2017. Playing a home game against their rivals from just down interstate I-69, USF prevailed 40–20 over the Taylor University Crusaders. The game opened with USF's Justin Green returning the opening kick 96 yards for a touchdown. This was the second consecutive game where a USF returner scored on the opening kick. But Taylor quickly responded with an 80-yard drive of their own. Taylor actually took a 7–6 lead because USF failed to convert the kick after their score. From that point, the Cougars took over. The lead swelled to 40–7 as Green scored three more times. With the four touchdowns, Green established a new Cougar single-season record for touchdowns: it was his 22nd of the year. Two 4th-quarter scores by Taylor created the final score. Saint Francis was in control the whole way, though their offense was stopped by 4 turnovers - 3 fumbles lost and 1 interception. With the win today, USF reached one goal for the season: completing an undefeated season and carrying their #1 ranking from preseason and into the playoffs. With a bye week next week, USF will be the #1 seed in the playoffs.

11/18/2017 - The Cougars opened the playoff season with a rain-soaked game against the Benedictine Ravens. This was the first match-up between the two winningest active coaches in NAIA football. Because of lightning and solid heavy rainfall, the start of the game was pushed back from a 12:00 noon intended kickoff to a 6:00 p.m. game played under the lights. The weather impacted the high-powered offense of both teams; the game saw a total of 8 fumbles and 1 interception. The game was close throughout, and in the end Saint Francis prevailed 26–21. The Cougars took the opening kick-off and drove for a quick 6–0 lead. The extra point attempt was blocked. That was the only score for the Cougars in the first half. The Ravens scored twice in the 2nd quarter, including a 51-yard pass that set up the second score with only 10 seconds remaining in the half. Saint Francis responded quickly and explosively, taking the opening kick and returning it for an 86-yard touchdown by Justin Green. The TD return was the third by the Cougars in the last 3 games. In addition to the kick-off return, Green scored 1 TD as he rushed for 191 yards. For his effort, Green was named the Offensive Player of the Game. Defensive honors went to Ryan Johnson, whose solid play included breaking up 3 pass plays.

11/25/2017 - The Cougars returned to the playing field in a quarterfinal match vs. the 10th-ranked Red Raiders from Northwestern College (IA). The visitors came in with only 1 loss, at the hands of perennial playoff power Morningside College. Both teams sported highly ranked defenses and offenses that were capable of scoring plenty of points. In the end, the Cougars rose to the occasion. The Cougars won the coin toss and elected to receive. The opening kickoff sailed through the end zone for a touchback. The USF offense then patiently and methodically possessed the ball as they drove the ball 75 yards for a score that would prove to be all the points they would need. The defense had three pass interceptions and 1 fumble recovery. The final score was 30–3. Justin Green scored twice, one by pass and one by run. Dan Ricksy caught 2 touchdown passes. For his effort, Ricksy was named the Offensive Player of the Game. The defensive honor went to Eric Dunten. The game marked another milestone victory for Cougars and their head coach Kevin Donley. The win was the 200th victory in the 20th season of the program, all under the leadership of Donley as head coach.

12/02/2017 - The Cougars were home to host the #3-ranked Morningside Mustangs for the right to travel to Daytona Beach and the NAIA Football National Championship. The two undefeateds were similar in makeup, with each sporting a passing quarterback, a leading rusher, and a stingy defense. The contest was hard-fought, and the Cougars emerged with a 43–36 win. The two teams traded punts before Saint Francis marched the field for the first of three consecutive TD drives that gave them a 19–3 advantage at the end of the 1st quarter. The extra-point kick was good, and the Cougars led 7–0. Ironically, that was the only PAT the Cougars were to score on the day. Throughout the afternoon, USF would score 6 additional TDs. But injured kicker Gavin Gardner was unable to return to the game, and Saint Francis missed 5 straight 2-point conversions before trying a failed kick attempt after their final score. On the other hand, Morningside converted 2 field goal attempts and 2 2-point conversions to give them a decided advantage in the kicking output. Saint Francis led the entire game except for a brief point in the 4th quarter when the Mustangs took a 28–25 lead. The lead reverted to USF when Justin Green broke through the line for a 61-yard TD run just 3 plays and 1:08 later. For the second straight game, USF QB Nick Ferrer was outgained in passing yardage. Morningside QB Trent Solsma was 28 for 53, for a total of 406 yards. He had 1 interception that was returned for a TD. Ferrer threw less frequently, going 19 for 31 for 267 yards. Cougar rusher Justin Green was the game's leading rusher, netting 234 yards on 244 yards of gains offset by 10 yards of losses. This effort outperformed the NAIA's leading rusher, the Mustangs' RB Bubba Jenkins, who gained a net of 73 yards on 24 rushing attempts, or just over 3.0 yards/attempt. Both QBs threw for 3 TDs, and Green added 3 rushing TDs. For this contribution, Green was once again named the Offensive Player of the Game. The Defensive award had two recipients, Wilmer Cole and Eric Hemmelgarn. On an unrelated note, it was Hemmelgarn who took over the kickoff duties after Gardner was unable to perform.

12/16/2017 - The Cougars returned to the national championship title game with an undefeated record of 13–0. Their opponent was Reinhardt (GA), a team they had faced and defeated in each of the previous two postseasons. Led by the NAIA Player of the Year, quarterback Nick Ferrer, the Cougars completed the undefeated season by defeating the Eagles 24–13. The completion of back-to-back national championships was only the 5th time that feat had been performed in NAIA football history. The Cougars broke out early, leading 17–0 after the 1st quarter. They extended the lead to 24–0 in the 2nd quarter before Rhinehardt scored to set the halftime score at 24–7. The second half was a defensive battle, with Rhinehardt tallying the only points on a TD and blocked extra point attempt. Highlights of the game were Justin Green rushed for 144 yards on 24 carries, with 2 TDs scored including one on an 80-yard dash in the first quarter; Nick Ferrer passed for 270 yards and 1 TD on 19 of 30 passes without an interception; Duke Blackwell received 5 passes for 96 yards and a TD before leaving the game with an injury; Eric Dunten with 17 tackles, 10 of them unassisted; and Piercen Harnish with 16 tackles, 6 of them unassisted. From these performers, Justin Green was named Offensive Player of the Game, and Eric Dunten was named the Defensive Player of the Game.

== National awards and honors ==
- Senior quarterback Nick Ferrer was named as the 2018 NAIA Football Player of the Year. This was the third time in Cougar football history that one of their players received the award.

== Ranking movements ==
Ranking movements
	Week											
Poll	Pre	1	2	3	4	5	6	7	8	9	10	Final
NAIA Coaches' Poll	1	1	1	1	1	1	1	1	1	1	1	1
