= 1999 Saint Francis Cougars football team =

American college football season

1999 Saint Francis Cougars football

NAIA Playoff Participant MSFA (MEL) champion
- Conference: Mid-States Football Association
- Mideast League
- Record: 8–3 (6–0 MSFA (MEL))
- Head coach: Kevin Donley (2nd season)
- Home stadium: Cougar Stadium

1999 Mid-States Football Association standings
	Conf.			Overall
Team	W		L	W		L
Mideast League
No. 12 Saint Francis (IN) x^	6	–	0	8	–	3
No. 19 Geneva	5	–	1	8	–	3
No. 24 Walsh	4	–	2	7	–	3
Tri-State	3	–	3	6	–	4
Tiffin	2	–	4	5	–	6
Malone	1	–	5	4	–	6
Urbana	0	–	6	1	–	10
Midwest League
No. 5 Taylor x^	5	–	1	10	–	2
No. 6 McKendree x^	5	–	1	9	–	2
No. 25 Olivet Nazarene x	5	–	1	6	–	4
Saint Xavier	3	–	3	4	–	6
St. Ambrose	2	–	4	4	–	6
Iowa Wesleyan	1	–	5	1	–	9
Trinity International	0	–	6	1	–	9
St. Francis (IL)	0	–	0	3	–	7
x – League champion/co-champions ^ – NAIA playoff participant; Rankings from NAIA Coaches' Poll

The 1999 Saint Francis Cougars football team represented the University of Saint Francis, located in Fort Wayne, Indiana, in the 1999 NAIA football season. They were led by head coach Kevin Donley, who served his 2nd year as the first and only head coach in the history of Saint Francis football. The Cougars played their home games at Cougar Stadium and were members of the Mid-States Football Association (MSFA) Mideast League (MEL). The Cougars finished in 1st place in the MSFA MEL division, receiving an automatic bid to the 1999 postseason NAIA playoffs.

The Cougars completed the season with an overall record of 8–3, the first winning season in school history. The three losses were at the hands of a Division-I program and against two NAIA ranked opponents. With their success in the regular season, the Cougars participated in their first-ever NAIA postseason playoff. They traveled to then #1-ranked Georgetown, where a 38–0 loss to the Tigers ended the Cougars' playoffs and season.

== Schedule ==
(8–3 overall, 6–0 conference)

Date	Opponent	Rank	Site	Result	Attendance
September 4	at Valparaiso*		Brown Field; Valparaiso, IN	L 6–35	
September 11	Saint Xavier*		Cougar Stadium; Fort Wayne, IN	W 42–38	
September 25	No. 21 McKendree*		Cougar Stadium; Fort Wayne, IN	L 21–27	
October 2	Geneva		Cougar Stadium; Fort Wayne, IN	W 56–26	
October 9	at No. 18 Tiffin		Tiffin, OH	W 21–14	
October 16	Urbana		Cougar Stadium; Fort Wayne, IN	W 35–12	
October 23	Trinity International*		Cougar Stadium; Fort Wayne, IN	W 54–36	
October 30	at Malone	No. 25	Fawcett Stadium; Canton, OH	W 30–14	
November 6	No. 24 Tri-State	No. 21	Cougar Stadium; Fort Wayne, IN	W 61–14	
November 13	at No. 19 Walsh	No. 17	Fawcett Stadium; Canton, OH	W 40–21	
November 20	at No. 1 Georgetown*	No. 12	Applebee's Field; Georgetown, KY (NAIA First Round)	L 0–38	1,250
*Non-conference game; Rankings from Coaches' Poll released prior to the game

== Game summaries ==
09/11/1999 - With a 42–38 victory over Saint Xavier, the Cougars picked up their first home win in program history today.

10/9/1999 - The Cougars traveled to Tiffin, OH to play the 18th-ranked Tiffin Dragons. The Cougars returned home with a 21–14 victory. It was the first time in Cougars' football history that they defeated a ranked opponent.

10/23/1999 - A 54–36 victory at home against the Trinity International Trojans marked the 4th consecutive win for the Cougars. Their success was noted in the 10/26/1999 Coaches Poll. The Cougars were ranked 25th, marking the first time a Cougars football team had appeared in the NAIA football polls.

11/13/1999 - The Cougars traveled to North Canton, OH to play the 19th-ranked Walsh Cavaliers. The Cougars returned home with a 40–21 victory. It was the Cougars' second consecutive win over a ranked team. The victory completed a perfect 6-0 conference schedule and brought the Cougars their first-ever MSFA MEL title.

== Ranking movements ==
Ranking movements Legend: ██ Increase in ranking ██ Decrease in ranking — = Not ranked
	Week												
Poll	Pre	1	2	3	4	5	6	7	8	9	10	11	Final
NAIA Coaches' Poll	—	—	—	—	—	—	—	—	25	21	17	12	
