= Adam Sherman =

American football coach (born c. 1982)

Current position
- Title: Head coach
- Team: Saint Francis (IN)
- Conference: MSFA
- Record: 10–3

Biographical details
- Born: c. 1982 (age 43–44); Indianapolis, Indiana, U.S.
- Education: University of Saint Francis (2005)

Playing career
- 2000–2004: Saint Francis (IN)
- Position: Offensive lineman

Coaching career (HC unless noted)
- 2005: Perry Meridian HS (IN) (OL)
- 2006: Kathleen HS (FL)
- 2007: Warren Central HS (IN) (OL)
- 2008–2012: Marian (IN) (OC/OL)
- 2013–2015: Walsh (AHC/OC/OL)
- 2016–2018: Greenfield-Central HS (IN)
- 2019–2021: ? HS (FL) (Note: Mentioned as coaching high school football in Florida before returning to Saint Francis (IN), but no source exists for which school.)
- 2022–2024: Saint Francis (IN) (OC/OL)
- 2025–present: Saint Francis (IN)

Head coaching record
- Overall: 10–3 (college)
- Tournaments: 1–1 (NAIA playoffs)

Accomplishments and honors

Championships
- 1 MEL (2025)

Awards
- 3× All-MEL (2002–2004)

Adam Sherman (born c. 1982) is an American college football coach. He is the head football coach for the University of Saint Francis, a position he has held since 2025. He was the head football coach for Kathleen High School in 2006 and Greenfield-Central High School from 2016 to 2018.

Sherman was a three-time All-Mid-States Football Association (MSFL) Mideast League offensive lineman at Saint Francis (IN). He began his coaching career as a high school football coach in Florida and Indiana before coaching for Marian (IN) and Walsh, including an NAIA football national championship with the former in 2012.

== Head coaching record ==
=== College ===
| Year | Team | Overall | Conference | Standing | Bowl/playoffs | NAIA^{#} |
|---|---|---|---|---|---|---|
Saint Francis Cougars (Mid-States Football Association) (2025–present)
| 2025 | Saint Francis | 10–3 | 4–1 | T–1st (MWL) | L NAIA Second Round | 16 |
| 2026 | Saint Francis | 0–0 | 0–0 | (MWL) | | |
| Saint Francis: | | 10–3 | 4–1 | | | |
| Total: | | 10–3 | | | | |
National championship Conference title Conference division title or championship game berth
