= Brad Christenson =

American football player (born 1977)

No. 88, 48
- Position: Tight end

Personal information
- Born: May 10, 1977 (age 49); Garland, Texas, U.S.
- Listed height: 6 ft 1 in (1.85 m)
- Listed weight: 256 lb (116 kg)

Career information
- High school: Clinton (Clinton, Oklahoma)
- College: Northwestern Oklahoma State (1995–1999)
- NFL draft: 2000: undrafted

Career history
- Jacksonville Jaguars (2000)*; Barcelona Dragons (2001); Oakland Raiders (2002)*; → Barcelona Dragons (2002); Baltimore Ravens (2002); Oakland Raiders (2002)
- * Offseason or practice squad member only

Awards and highlights
- NAIA national champion (1999); NAIA Second-team All-American (1999)

Career NFL statistics
- Games played: 1
- Stats at Pro Football Reference

Brandon "Brad" Wade Christenson (born May 10, 1977) is an American former professional football tight end who played in the National Football League (NFL) for the Jacksonville Jaguars, Oakland Raiders and Baltimore Ravens. He played college football for the Northwestern Oklahoma State Rangers. Christenson also had a stint with the Barcelona Dragons in NFL Europe.

== Early life ==
Christenson was born on May 10, 1977, in Garland, Texas. He attended Clinton High School in Clinton, Oklahoma.

== College career ==
Christenson played college football for the Northwestern Oklahoma State Rangers from 1995 to 1999. He played in 44 games at punter and tight end, placing in many top 10 school records at those positions. In 1999, Christenson was a second-team All-American and won the NAIA national championship, scoring the first touchdown of the game.

== Professional career ==
=== Jacksonville Jaguars ===
After going undrafted in the 2000 NFL draft, Christenson signed with the Jacksonville Jaguars as an undrafted free agent. On August 22, he was waived by the team.

=== Barcelona Dragons (first stint) ===
In 2001, Christenson played for the Barcelona Dragons of NFL Europe. He had nine receptions for 141 yards.

=== Oakland Raiders (first stint) ===
On January 30, 2002, he was signed by the Oakland Raiders. On September 1, he was released by the team.

=== Barcelona Dragons (second stint) ===
On February 12, 2002, Christenson was allocated to the Barcelona Dragons. In four games, he had 11 receptions for 105 yards and four touchdowns.

=== Baltimore Ravens ===
On September 4, 2002, Christenson was signed to the practice squad of the Baltimore Ravens.

=== Oakland Raiders (second stint) ===
On January 8, 2003, Christenson was signed to the Raider's practice squad. On January 11, he was promoted to the active roster. Christenson made his only game appearance in the AFC Championship game against the Tennessee Titans with no statistics. He was injured during the game and placed on injured reserve on January 21. Christenson became a free agent at the end of the season.
