= 1999 NAIA football season =

American college football season

- National Championship: Jim Carroll Stadium; Savannah, TN; December 18, 1999
- Champion: Northwestern Oklahoma State
- Player of the Year: Eddie Eviston (quarterback, Georgetown (KY))

The 1999 NAIA football season was the component of the 1999 college football season organized by the National Association of Intercollegiate Athletics (NAIA) in the United States. The season's playoffs, known as the NAIA Football National Championship, culminated with the championship game on December 18, at Jim Carroll Stadium in Savannah, Tennessee. The Northwestern Oklahoma State Rangers defeated the Georgetown Tigers, 34–26, in the title game to win the program's first NAIA championship.

== Conference and membership changes ==
=== Conference changes ===
- This was the final season for the North Dakota College Athletic Conference. The conference's six remaining members, all from North Dakota, would join with four South Dakota–based members of the South Dakota-Iowa Intercollegiate Conference to form the Dakota Athletic Conference for the 2000 season. At its dissolution, the NDCAC had sponsored football for seventy-seven seasons, beginning in 1922.
- This was also the final season for the South Dakota-Iowa Intercollegiate Conference. After the end of play, the SDIIC's remaining members joined either the new Dakota Athletic Conference (with former members of the NDCAC) or the existing Nebraska-Iowa Athletic Conference (which would subsequently rebrand as the Great Plains Athletic Conference). The SDIIC and its predecessor, the South Dakota Intercollegiate Conference, had sponsored football for eighty-two seasons, beginning in 1917.

== Conference standings ==
1999 Columbia Football Association standings
| | Conf. | | | Overall |
| Team | W | | L | W | | L |
|---|---|---|---|---|---|---|
| Western Washington $ | 4 | – | 0 | 8 | – | 3 |
| Western Oregon | 3 | – | 1 | 5 | – | 5 |
| Central Washington | 2 | – | 2 | 4 | – | 5 |
| Simon Fraser | 1 | – | 3 | 4 | – | 6 |
| Humboldt State | 0 | – | 4 | 3 | – | 7 |
$ – Conference champion

1999 Frontier Conference football standings
| | Conf. | | | Overall |
| Team | W | | L | W | | L |
|---|---|---|---|---|---|---|
| No. 10 Rocky Mountain $^ | 7 | – | 1 | 9 | – | 3 |
| Montana Tech | 6 | – | 2 | 7 | – | 4 |
| Carroll (MT) | 5 | – | 3 | 5 | – | 6 |
| Montana State–Northern | 1 | – | 7 | 3 | – | 8 |
| Western Montana | 1 | – | 7 | 1 | – | 8 |
+ – Conference co-champions; ^ – NAIA playoff participant; Rankings from NAIA Coaches' Poll

1999 Heart of America Athletic Conference football standings
| | Conf. | | | Overall |
| Team | W | | L | W | | L |
|---|---|---|---|---|---|---|
| No. 9 Missouri Valley $^ | 8 | – | 1 | 9 | – | 3 |
| No. 20 Evangel | 7 | – | 2 | 7 | – | 2 |
| No. 22 MidAmerica Nazarene | 6 | – | 3 | 7 | – | 4 |
| Baker | 6 | – | 3 | 6 | – | 4 |
| William Jewell | 5 | – | 4 | 5 | – | 4 |
| Lindenwood | 5 | – | 4 | 5 | – | 5 |
| Benedictine (KS) | 4 | – | 5 | 5 | – | 5 |
| Graceland | 3 | – | 6 | 4 | – | 6 |
| Culver–Stockton | 1 | – | 8 | 1 | – | 9 |
| Central Methodist | 0 | – | 9 | 0 | – | 10 |
$ – Conference champion; ^ – NAIA playoff participant; Rankings from NAIA Coaches' Poll

1999 Kansas Collegiate Athletic Conference football standings
| | Conf. | | | Overall |
| Team | W | | L | W | | L |
|---|---|---|---|---|---|---|
| No. 13 Bethany (KS) +^ | 7 | – | 1 | 8 | – | 2 |
| No. 17 Southwestern (KS) + | 7 | – | 1 | 8 | – | 3 |
| McPherson | 5 | – | 3 | 7 | – | 3 |
| Ottawa | 5 | – | 3 | 6 | – | 3 |
| Sterling | 4 | – | 4 | 5 | – | 5 |
| Friends | 4 | – | 4 | 4 | – | 6 |
| Bethel (KS) | 2 | – | 6 | 3 | – | 7 |
| Kansas Wesleyan | 2 | – | 6 | 2 | – | 7 |
| Tabor | 0 | – | 8 | 0 | – | 10 |
+ – Conference co-champions; ^ – NAIA playoff participant; Rankings from NAIA Coaches' Poll

1999 Mid-South Conference football standings
| | Conf. | | | Overall |
| Team | W | | L | W | | L |
|---|---|---|---|---|---|---|
| No. 1 Georgetown (KY) $^ | 7 | – | 0 | 13 | – | 1 |
| No. 14 Lambuth ^ | 6 | – | 1 | 8 | – | 4 |
| North Greenville | 5 | – | 2 | 5 | – | 6 |
| Belhaven | 4 | – | 3 | 7 | – | 4 |
| Campbellsville | 2 | – | 5 | 2 | – | 8 |
| Cumberland (KY) | 2 | – | 5 | 3 | – | 8 |
| Cumberland (TN) | 2 | – | 5 | 2 | – | 8 |
| Union (KY) | 0 | – | 7 | 0 | – | 11 |
$ – Conference champion; ^ – NAIA playoff participant; Rankings from NAIA Coaches' Poll

1999 Mid-States Football Association standings
| | Conf. | | | Overall |
| Team | W | | L | W | | L |
|---|---|---|---|---|---|---|
Mideast League
| No. 12 Saint Francis (IN) x^ | 6 | – | 0 | 8 | – | 3 |
| No. 19 Geneva | 5 | – | 1 | 8 | – | 3 |
| No. 24 Walsh | 4 | – | 2 | 7 | – | 3 |
| Tri-State | 3 | – | 3 | 6 | – | 4 |
| Tiffin | 2 | – | 4 | 5 | – | 6 |
| Malone | 1 | – | 5 | 4 | – | 6 |
| Urbana | 0 | – | 6 | 1 | – | 10 |
Midwest League
| No. 5 Taylor x^ | 5 | – | 1 | 10 | – | 2 |
| No. 6 McKendree x^ | 5 | – | 1 | 9 | – | 2 |
| No. 25 Olivet Nazarene x | 5 | – | 1 | 6 | – | 4 |
| Saint Xavier | 3 | – | 3 | 4 | – | 6 |
| St. Ambrose | 2 | – | 4 | 4 | – | 6 |
| Iowa Wesleyan | 1 | – | 5 | 1 | – | 9 |
| Trinity International | 0 | – | 6 | 1 | – | 9 |
| St. Francis (IL) | 0 | – | 0 | 3 | – | 7 |
x – League champion/co-champions ^ – NAIA playoff participant; Rankings from NAIA Coaches' Poll

1999 Nebraska-Iowa Athletic Conference football standings
| | Conf. | | | Overall |
| Team | W | | L | W | | L |
|---|---|---|---|---|---|---|
| No. 3 Hastings $^ | 6 | – | 0 | 11 | – | 1 |
| No. 15 Doane ^ | 4 | – | 2 | 7 | – | 3 |
| Concordia (NE) | 3 | – | 3 | 5 | – | 4 |
| Northwestern (IA) | 3 | – | 3 | 5 | – | 4 |
| Dana | 2 | – | 4 | 4 | – | 6 |
| Midland | 2 | – | 4 | 4 | – | 6 |
| Nebraska Wesleyan | 1 | – | 5 | 4 | – | 6 |
$ – Conference champion; ^ – NAIA playoff participant; Rankings from NAIA Coaches' Poll

1999 North Dakota College Athletic Conference football standings
| | Conf. | | | Overall |
| Team | W | | L | W | | L |
|---|---|---|---|---|---|---|
| No. 4 Mary $^ | 5 | – | 0 | 11 | – | 2 |
| No. 23 Valley City State | 3 | – | 2 | 7 | – | 2 |
| No. 8 Dickinson State ^ | 3 | – | 2 | 7 | – | 3 |
| Minot State | 3 | – | 2 | 4 | – | 4 |
| Mayville State | 1 | – | 4 | 2 | – | 7 |
| Jamestown | 0 | – | 5 | 1 | – | 8 |
$ – Conference champion; ^ – NAIA playoff participant; Rankings from NAIA Coaches' Poll

1999 NAIA independents football records
| | Conf. | | | Overall |
| Team | W | | L | W | | L |
|---|---|---|---|---|---|---|
| No. 1 NW Oklahoma State ^ | | – | | 13 | – | 0 |
| No. 7 Azusa Pacific ^ | | – | | 9 | – | 3 |
| Southern Oregon | | – | | 7 | – | 2 |
| Virginia–Wise | | – | | 6 | – | 3 |
| Peru State | | – | | 3 | – | 7 |
^ – NAIA playoff participant
