= 2017 NAIA football rankings =

One human poll made up the 2017 National Association of Intercollegiate Athletics (NAIA) football rankings, sometimes called the NAIA Coaches' Poll or the football ratings. When the regular season was complete, the NAIA conducted a playoff to determine the year's national champion. A final poll was taken after completion of the 2017 NAIA Football National Championship.

== Poll release dates ==
The poll released a spring edition of the rankings on April 10, 2017. A complete schedule of poll release dates will be:

2017 Poll Release Dates
Spring	April 10
Preseason	August 7
Week 1	September 11
Week 2	September 18
Week 3	September 25
Week 4	October 2
Week 5	October 9
Week 6	October 16
Week 7	October 23
Week 8	October 30
Week 9	November 6
Week 10 (Final Regular Season)	November 12
Postseason	December 19

== Week by week poll ==
	Week 0-Spring Apr 10	Week 0-Preseason Aug 7	Week 1-Poll 1 Sep 11	Week 2-Poll 2 Sep 18	Week 3-Poll 3 Sep 25	Week 4-Poll 4 Oct 2	Week 5-Poll 5 Oct 9	Week 6-Poll 6 Oct 16	Week 7-Poll 7 Oct 23	Week 8-Poll 8 Oct 30	Week 9-Poll 9 Nov 6	Week 10-Final Nov 12	Week 11-Postseason Dec 19	
1.	Saint Francis (IN)	Saint Francis (IN)	Saint Francis (IN)	Saint Francis (IN)	Saint Francis (IN)	Saint Francis (IN)	Saint Francis (IN)	Saint Francis (IN)	Saint Francis (IN)	Saint Francis (IN)	Saint Francis (IN)	Saint Francis (IN)	Saint Francis (IN)	1.
2.	Baker (KS)	Baker (KS)	Baker (KS)	Baker (KS)	Baker (KS)	Baker (KS)	Baker (KS)	Baker (KS)	Baker (KS)	Baker (KS)	Reinhardt (GA)	Reinhardt (GA)	Reinhardt (GA)	2.
3.	Reinhardt (GA)	Reinhardt (GA)	Reinhardt (GA)	Reinhardt (GA)	Reinhardt (GA)	Reinhardt (GA)	Reinhardt (GA)	Reinhardt (GA)	Reinhardt (GA)	Reinhardt (GA)	Morningside (IA)	Morningside (IA)	Morningside (IA)	3.
4.	Eastern Oregon	Morningside (IA)	Morningside (IA)	Morningside (IA)	Morningside (IA)	Morningside (IA)	Morningside (IA)	Morningside (IA)	Morningside (IA)	Morningside (IA)	Lindsey Wilson (KY)	Lindsey Wilson (KY)	Southern Oregon	4.
5.	Marian (IN)	Marian (IN)	Montana Tech	Montana Tech	Montana Tech	Montana Tech	Lindsey Wilson (KY)	Lindsey Wilson (KY)	Lindsey Wilson (KY)	Lindsey Wilson (KY)	Southern Oregon	Southern Oregon	Lindsey Wilson (KY)	5.
6.	Morningside (IA)	Montana Tech	Lindsey Wilson (KY)	Lindsey Wilson (KY)	Lindsey Wilson (KY)	Lindsey Wilson (KY)	Grand View (IA)	Grand View (IA)	Grand View (IA)	Grand View (IA)	Grand View (IA)	Baker (KS)	Saint Xavier (IL)	6.
7.	Montana Tech	Eastern Oregon	Doane (NE)	Doane (NE)	Grand View (IA)	Grand View (IA)	Southern Oregon	Southern Oregon	Southern Oregon	Southern Oregon	Baker (KS)	Langston (OK)	Georgetown (KY)	7.
8.	Lindsey Wilson (KY)	Lindsey Wilson (KY)	Marian (IN)	Grand View (IA)	Marian (IN)	Southern Oregon	Langston (OK)	Langston (OK)	Langston (OK)	Langston (OK)	Langston (OK)	Saint Xavier (IL)	Northwestern (IA)	8.
9.	Grand View (IA)	Grand View (IA)	Grand View (IA)	Marian (IN)	Southern Oregon	Langston (OK)	Georgetown (KY)	Georgetown (KY)	Georgetown (KY)	Georgetown (KY)	Saint Xavier (IL)	Southeastern (FL)	Baker (KS)	9.
10.	Doane (NE)	Tabor (KS)	Southeastern (FL)	Southeastern (FL)	Arizona Christian	Georgetown (KY)	Saint Xavier (IL)	Saint Xavier (IL)	Saint Xavier (IL)	Saint Xavier (IL)	Southeastern (FL)	Northwestern (IA)	Southeastern (FL)	10.
11.	Missouri Valley (MO)	Doane (NE)	Eastern Oregon	Saint Xavier (IL)	Langston (OK)	Saint Xavier (IL)	Montana Tech	Montana Tech	Montana Tech	Benedictine (KS)	Northwestern (IA)	Grand View (IA)	Grand View (IA)	11.
12.	Tabor (KS)	Missouri Valley (MO)	Arizona Christian	Arizona Christian	Georgetown (KY)	Doane (NE)	Benedictine (KS)	Benedictine (KS)	Benedictine (KS)	Southeastern (FL)	(T) Georgetown (KY)	(T) Georgetown (KY)	Benedictine (KS)	12.
13.	Sterling (KS)	Robert Morris (IL)	Saint Xavier (IL)	Southern Oregon	Saint Xavier (IL)	Marian (IN)	Marian (IN)	Marian (IN)	Southeastern (FL)	Northwestern (IA)	(T) Dickinson State (ND)	(T) Dickinson State (ND)	Langston (OK)	13.
14.	Dickinson State (ND)	Sterling (KS)	Southern Oregon	Benedictine (KS)	Doane (NE)	Benedictine (KS)	Southeastern (FL)	Southeastern (FL)	Northwestern (IA)	Dickinson State (ND)	Concordia (MI)	Concordia (MI)	Dickinson State (ND)	14.
15.	Robert Morris (IL)	Dickinson State (ND)	Langston (OK)	Langston (OK)	Northwestern (IA)	Southeastern (FL)	Sterling (KS)	Northwestern (IA)	Dickinson State (ND)	Concordia (MI)	Benedictine (KS)	Benedictine (KS)	Concordia (MI)	15.
16.	Dakota Wesleyan (SD)	Southeastern (FL)	(T) Georgetown (KY)	Georgetown (KY)	Southeastern (FL)	Tabor (KS)	Arizona Christian	Dickinson State (ND)	Concordia (MI)	SAGU	Sterling (KS)	Sterling (KS)	Sterling (KS)	16.
17.	Kansas Wesleyan	Dakota Wesleyan (SD)	(T) Benedictine (KS)	Tabor (KS)	Tabor (KS)	Sterling (KS)	Northwestern (IA)	Concordia (MI)	SAGU	Montana Tech	Tabor (KS)	Tabor (KS)	Tabor (KS)	17.
18.	Southeastern (FL)	Arizona Christian	Tabor (KS)	Sterling (KS)	Benedictine (KS)	Arizona Christian	Dickinson State (ND)	SAGU	Sterling (KS)	Sterling (KS)	Campbellsville (KY)	SAGU	Marian (IN)	18.
19.	Montana Western	Montana Western	MidAmerica Nazarene (KS)	Northwestern (IA)	Sterling (KS)	Northwestern (IA)	(T) Doane (NE)	Doane (NE)	Tabor (KS)	Tabor (KS)	Marian (IN)	Marian (IN)	SAGU	19.
20.	Concordia (NE)	Kansas Wesleyan	Sterling (KS)	Dickinson State (ND)	Dickinson State (ND)	Concordia (MI)	(T) Hastings (NE)	(T) Sterling (KS)	Campbellsville (KY)	Marian (IN)	SAGU	Campbellsville (KY)	Campbellsville (KY)	20.
21.	Langston (OK)	Georgetown (KY)	Dickinson State (ND)	Cumberland (TN)	Concordia (MI)	Dickinson State (ND)	Concordia (MI)	(T) Tabor (KS)	Marian (IN)	Campbellsville (KY)	Arizona Christian	Kansas Wesleyan	Kansas Wesleyan	21.
22.	Arizona Christian	Langston (OK)	Dakota Wesleyan (SD)	MidAmerica Nazarene (KS)	Cumberland (TN)	Dakota Wesleyan (SD)	SAGU	Cumberland (TN)	Cumberland (TN)	Cumberland (TN)	Montana Tech	Faulkner (AL)	Faulkner (AL)	22.
23.	Georgetown (KY)	William Penn (IA)	St. Ambrose (IA)	Eastern Oregon	Peru State (NE)	SAGU	Tabor (KS)	Arizona Christian	Arizona Christian	Arizona Christian	Evangel (MO)	Dakota State (SD)	Dakota State (SD)	23.
24.	Benedictine (KS)	Saint Xavier (IL)	Northwestern (IA)	Kansas Wesleyan	Midland (NE)	Hastings (NE)	Cumberland (TN)	Kansas Wesleyan	Doane (NE)	Doane (NE)	Kansas Wesleyan	Oklahoma Panhandle State	Oklahoma Panhandle State	24.
25.	William Penn (IA)	Southern Oregon	Kansas Wesleyan	(T) Concordia (MI); (T) Hastings (NE)	Dakota Wesleyan (SD)	Kansas Wesleyan	Kansas Wesleyan	Campbellsville (KY)	Dakota State (SD)	Evangel (MO)	Concordia (NE)	Evangel (MO)	Evangel (MO)	25.
	Week 0-Spring Apr 10	Week 0-Preseason Aug 7	Week 1-Poll 1 Sep 11	Week 2-Poll 2 Sep 18	Week 3-Poll 3 Sep 25	Week 4-Poll 4 Oct 2	Week 5-Poll 5 Oct 9	Week 6-Poll 6 Oct 16	Week 7-Poll 7 Oct 23	Week 8-Poll 8 Oct 30	Week 9-Poll 9 Nov 6	Week 10-Final Nov 12	Week 11-Postseason Dec 19	
		Dropped: Concordia (NE); Benedictine (KS)	Dropped: Missouri Valley (MO); Robert Morris (IL); Montana Western; William Penn (IA)	Dropped: Dakota Wesleyan (SD); St. Ambrose (IA)	Dropped: MidAmerica Nazarene (KS); Eastern Oregon; Kansas Wesleyan; Hastings (NE)	Dropped: Peru State (NE); Midland (NE); Cumberland (TN)	Dropped: Dakota Wesleyan (SD)	Dropped: Hastings (NE)	Dropped: Kansas Wesleyan	Dropped: Dakota State (SD)	Dropped: Cumberland (TN); Doane (NE)	Dropped: Arizona Christian; Montana Tech; Concordia (NE)	Dropped: NONE	

Legend
	No change in ranking
	Increase in ranking
	Decrease in ranking
	Not ranked previous week
	NAIA National Champion
(т)	Tied with team above or below also with this symbol

== Leading vote-getters ==
Since the inception of the Coaches' Poll in 1999, the #1 ranking in the various weekly polls has been held by only a select group of teams. Through the last (postseason) poll of the 2017 season, the teams and the number of times they have held the #1 weekly ranking are shown below. The number of times a team has been ranked #1 in the postseason poll (the national champion) is shown in parentheses.

There has been only one tie for the leading vote-getter in a weekly poll. In 2015, Southern Oregon was tied with Marian (IN) in the preseason poll.

In 1999, the results of a postseason poll, if one was conducted, are not known. Therefore, an additional poll has been presumed, and the #1 postseason ranking has been credited to the postseason tournament champion, the Northwestern Oklahoma State Rangers.

Team	Total #1 Rankings
Carroll (MT)	57 (6)
Sioux Falls (SD)	55 (3)
Georgetown (KY)	25 (2)
Marian (IN)	24 (2)
Morningside (IA)	20
Saint Francis (IN)	17 (2)
Saint Xavier (IL)	14 (1)
Northwestern Oklahoma State	12 (1)
Southern Oregon	5 (1)
Grand View (IA)	4 (1)
Lindsey Wilson (KY)	4
Azusa Pacific (CA)	3
Cumberlands (KY)	2
