= 2016 NAIA football rankings =

One human poll made up the 2016 National Association of Intercollegiate Athletics (NAIA) football rankings, sometimes called the NAIA Coaches' Poll or the football ratings. When the regular season was complete, the NAIA conducted a playoff to determine the year's national champion. A final poll was taken after completion of the 2016 NAIA Football National Championship.

== Poll release dates ==
The poll release dates were:

2016 Poll Release Dates
Spring	April 11
Preseason	August 8
Week 1	September 12
Week 2	September 19
Week 3	September 26
Week 4	October 3
Week 5	October 10
Week 6	October 17
Week 7	October 24
Week 8	October 31
Week 9	November 7
Week 10 (Final Regular Season)	November 13
Postseason	December 20

== Week by week poll ==
	Week 0-Spring Apr 11	Week 0-Preseason Aug 8	Week 1-Poll 1 Sep 12	Week 2-Poll 2 Sep 19	Week 3-Poll 3 Sep 26	Week 4-Poll 4 Oct 3	Week 5-Poll 5 Oct 10	Week 6-Poll 6 Oct 17	Week 7-Poll 7 Oct 24	Week 8-Poll 8 Oct 31	Week 9-Poll 9 Nov 7	Week 10-Final Nov 13	Week 11-Postseason Dec 20	
1.	Marian (IN)	Marian (IN)	Marian (IN)	Marian (IN)	Marian (IN)	Marian (IN)	Marian (IN)	Marian (IN)	Marian (IN)	Marian (IN)	Marian (IN)	Marian (IN)	Saint Francis (IN)	1.
2.	Southern Oregon	Southern Oregon	Morningside (IA)	Morningside (IA)	Saint Francis (IN)	Baker (KS)	Baker (KS)	Baker (KS)	Baker (KS)	Baker (KS)	Baker (KS)	Baker (KS)	Baker (KS)	2.
3.	Morningside (IA)	Morningside (IA)	Saint Francis (IN)	Saint Francis (IN)	Baker (KS)	Doane (NE)	Reinhardt (GA)	Reinhardt (GA)	Reinhardt (GA)	Reinhardt (GA)	Reinhardt (GA)	Reinhardt (GA)	Reinhardt (GA)	3.
4.	Saint Francis (IN)	Saint Francis (IN)	Baker (KS)	Baker (KS)	Doane (NE)	Reinhardt (GA)	Saint Francis (IN)	(T) Saint Francis (IN)	Saint Francis (IN)	Saint Francis (IN)	Saint Francis (IN)	Saint Francis (IN)	Eastern Oregon	4.
5.	Baker (KS)	Baker (KS)	(T) Doane (NE)	Doane (NE)	Reinhardt (GA)	Saint Francis (IN)	Morningside (IA)	(T) Morningside (IA)	Morningside (IA)	Morningside (IA)	Morningside (IA)	Morningside (IA)	Marian (IN)	5.
6.	Grand View (IA)	Grand View (IA)	(T) Reinhardt (GA)	Reinhardt (GA)	Morningside (IA)	Morningside (IA)	Lindsey Wilson (KY)	Lindsey Wilson (KY)	Grand View (IA)	Grand View (IA)	Montana Tech	Montana Tech	Morningside (IA)	6.
7.	Montana Tech	Montana Tech	Lindsey Wilson (KY)	Lindsey Wilson (KY)	Lindsey Wilson (KY)	Lindsey Wilson (KY)	Grand View (IA)	Grand View (IA)	Montana Tech	Montana Tech	Doane (NE)	Doane (NE)	Montana Tech	7.
8.	Tabor (KS)	Tabor (KS)	Grand View (IA)	Grand View (IA)	Grand View (IA)	Grand View (IA)	Southern Oregon	Montana Tech	Doane (NE)	Doane (NE)	Lindsey Wilson (KY)	Lindsey Wilson (KY)	Lindsey Wilson (KY)	8.
9.	Doane (NE)	Doane (NE)	Saint Xavier (IL)	Southern Oregon	Southern Oregon	Southern Oregon	Montana Tech	Doane (NE)	Missouri Valley (MO)	Missouri Valley (MO)	Eastern Oregon	Eastern Oregon	Grand View (IA)	9.
10.	Reinhardt (GA)	Saint Xavier (IL)	(T) Kansas Wesleyan	Montana Tech	Montana Tech	Montana Tech	Doane (NE)	Georgetown (KY)	Lindsey Wilson (KY)	Lindsey Wilson (KY)	Kansas Wesleyan	Grand View (IA)	Doane (NE)	10.
11.	Saint Xavier (IL)	Reinhardt (GA)	(T) Eastern Oregon	Missouri Valley (MO)	Georgetown (KY)	Georgetown (KY)	Georgetown (KY)	Missouri Valley (MO)	Eastern Oregon	Eastern Oregon	Grand View (IA)	Missouri Valley (MO)	Missouri Valley (MO)	11.
12.	Campbellsville (KY)	Lindsey Wilson (KY)	Southern Oregon	Benedictine (KS)	Tabor (KS)	Tabor (KS)	Tabor (KS)	(T) Dickinson State (ND)	Dickinson State (ND)	Kansas Wesleyan	Missouri Valley (MO)	Tabor (KS)	Tabor (KS)	12.
13.	Lindsey Wilson (KY)	Kansas Wesleyan	Montana Tech	Tabor (KS)	Missouri Valley (MO)	Missouri Valley (MO)	Missouri Valley (MO)	(T) Eastern Oregon	Kansas Wesleyan	Tabor (KS)	Tabor (KS)	Sterling (KS)	Sterling (KS)	13.
14.	Kansas Wesleyan	St. Francis (IL)	Dakota Wesleyan (SD)	Georgetown (KY)	Kansas Wesleyan	(T) Kansas Wesleyan	Dickinson State (ND)	Kansas Wesleyan	Dakota Wesleyan (SD)	Southeastern (FL)	Southeastern (FL)	Dickinson State (ND)	Dickinson State (ND)	14.
15.	Dakota Wesleyan (SD)	Benedictine (KS)	Benedictine (KS)	Eastern Oregon	Dickinson State (ND)	(T) Dickinson State (ND)	Kansas Wesleyan	Dakota Wesleyan (SD)	Georgetown (KY)	Sterling (KS)	(T) Sterling (KS)	Robert Morris (IL)	Robert Morris (IL)	15.
16.	Montana Western	Dakota Wesleyan (SD)	Missouri Valley (MO)	Concordia (NE)	Dakota Wesleyan (SD)	(T) Dakota Wesleyan (SD)	(T) Eastern Oregon	Bethel (TN)	Tabor (KS)	Dickinson State (ND)	(T) Dickinson State (ND)	Dakota Wesleyan (SD)	Dakota Wesleyan (SD)	16.
17.	St. Francis (IL)	Campbellsville (KY)	Tabor (KS)	Saint Xavier (IL)	Eastern Oregon	(T) Eastern Oregon	(T) Dakota Wesleyan (SD)	Southern Oregon	Southeastern (FL)	Georgetown (KY)	Georgetown (KY)	Kansas Wesleyan	Kansas Wesleyan	17.
18.	Dickinson State (ND)	Georgetown (KY)	(T) Georgetown (KY)	Sterling (KS)	(T) Benedictine (KS)	Dakota State (SD)	Bethel (TN)	Tabor (KS)	Sterling (KS)	Dakota Wesleyan (SD)	Dakota Wesleyan (SD)	Concordia (NE)	Southeastern (FL)	18.
19.	Point (GA)	Faulkner (AL)	(T) MidAmerica Nazarene (KS)	Faulkner (AL)	(T) Midland (NE)	Bethel (TN)	Dakota State (SD)	Benedictine (KS)	Bethel (TN)	Robert Morris (IL)	Robert Morris (IL)	Montana Western	Concordia (NE)	19.
20.	Benedictine (KS)	Arizona Christian	Concordia (NE)	Kansas Wesleyan	Dakota State (SD)	Benedictine (KS)	Benedictine (KS)	Southeastern (FL)	Arizona Christian	William Penn (IA)	William Penn (IA)	Southeastern (FL)	Montana Western	20.
21.	St. Ambrose (IA)	Dickinson State (ND)	Carroll (MT)	Dickinson State (ND)	Concordia (NE)	Midland (NE)	Midland (NE)	Montana Western	Concordia (NE)	Concordia (NE)	Concordia (NE)	Langston (OK)	Langston (OK)	21.
22.	Arizona Christian	Carroll (MT)	(T) Dickinson State (ND)	Dakota Wesleyan (SD)	Peru State (NE)	Montana Western	Peru State (NE)	Midland (NE)	Benedictine (KS)	Wayland Baptist (TX)	Montana Western	Arizona Christian	Arizona Christian	22.
23.	Georgetown (KY)	William Penn (IA)	(T) Montana Western	MidAmerica Nazarene (KS)	Bethel (TN)	Concordia (MI)	Southeastern (FL)	Dakota State (SD)	Southern Oregon	Bethel (TN)	Langston (OK)	(T) William Penn (IA)	Benedictine (KS)	23.
24.	Faulkner (AL)	St. Ambrose (IA)	Faulkner (AL)	Dakota State (SD)	Montana Western	Peru State (NE)	Concordia (NE)	Robert Morris (IL)	Robert Morris (IL)	Montana Western	Benedictine (KS)	(T) Benedictine (KS)	William Penn (IA)	24.
25.	William Penn (IA)	Montana Western	Rocky Mountain (MT)	(T) Midland (NE); (T) Webber International (FL)	Sterling (KS)	Rocky Mountain (MT)	Montana Western	Sterling (KS)	Dakota State (SD)	Langston (OK)	Arizona Christian	Georgetown (KY)	Georgetown (KY)	25.
	Week 0-Spring Apr 11	Week 0-Preseason Aug 8	Week 1-Poll 1 Sep 12	Week 2-Poll 2 Sep 19	Week 3-Poll 3 Sep 26	Week 4-Poll 4 Oct 3	Week 5-Poll 5 Oct 10	Week 6-Poll 6 Oct 17	Week 7-Poll 7 Oct 24	Week 8-Poll 8 Oct 31	Week 9-Poll 9 Nov 7	Week 10-Final Nov 13	Week 11-Postseason Dec 20	
		Dropped: Point (GA)	Dropped: St. Francis (IL); Campbellsville (KY); Arizona Christian; William Penn (IA); St. Ambrose (IA)	Dropped: Carroll (MT); Montana Western; Rocky Mountain (MT)	Dropped: Saint Xavier (IL); Faulkner (AL); Mid America Nazarene (KS); Webber International (FL)	Dropped: Concordia (NE); Sterling (KS)	Dropped: Concordia (MI); Rocky Mountain (MT)	Dropped: Peru State (NE); Concordia (NE)	Dropped: Montana Western; Midland (NE)	Dropped: Arizona Christian; Benedictine (KS); Southern Oregon; Dakota State (SD)	Dropped: Wayland Baptist (TX); Bethel (TN)	Dropped: NONE	Dropped: NONE	

Legend
	No change in ranking
	Increase in ranking
	Decrease in ranking
	Not ranked previous week
	NAIA National Champion
(т)	Tied with team above or below also with this symbol

== Leading vote-getters ==
Since the inception of the Coaches' Poll in 1999, the #1 ranking in the various weekly polls has been held by only a select group of teams. Through the final poll of the 2016 season, the team and the number of times they have held the #1 weekly ranking are shown below. The number of times a team has been ranked #1 in the postseason poll (the national champion) is shown in parentheses.

There has been only one tie for the leading vote-getter in a weekly poll. In 2015, Southern Oregon was tied with Marian (IN) in the preseason poll.

In 1999, the results of a postseason poll, if one was conducted, are not known. Therefore, an additional poll has been presumed, and the #1 postseason ranking has been credited to the postseason tournament champion, the Northwestern Oklahoma State Rangers.

Team	Total #1 Rankings
Carroll (MT)	57 (6)
Sioux Falls (SD)	55 (3)
Georgetown (KY)	25 (2)
Marian (IN)	24 (2)
Morningside (IA)	20
Saint Xavier (IL)	14 (1)
Northwestern Oklahoma State	12 (1)
Southern Oregon	5 (1)
Grand View (IA)	4 (1)
Saint Francis (IN)	4 (1)
Lindsey Wilson (KY)	4
Azusa Pacific (CA)	3
Cumberlands (KY)	2
