= 2016 NAIA football season =

American college football season

- Regular season: August 25 – November 12
- Postseason: November 19 – December 17
- National Championship: Daytona Beach Municipal Stadium; Daytona Beach, FL; December 17, 2016
- Champion: Saint Francis (IN)
- Player of the Year: Logan Brettell (quarterback, Baker)

The 2016 NAIA football season was the component of the 2016 college football season organized by the National Association of Intercollegiate Athletics (NAIA) in the United States. The season's playoffs, known as the NAIA Football National Championship, culminated with the championship game on December 17, at Daytona Beach Municipal Stadium in Daytona Beach, Florida. The Saint Francis Cougars defeated the Baker Wildcats, 38–17, in the title game to win the program's first NAIA championship.

== Conference standings ==
2016 Central States Football League standings
	Conf.			Overall
Team	W		L	W		L
No. 22 Arizona Christian $	6	–	0	7	–	3
No. 21 Langston	5	–	1	7	–	2
Wayland Baptist	4	–	2	7	–	3
SAGU	2	–	4	4	–	6
Lyon	2	–	4	3	–	8
Bacone	2	–	4	2	–	8
Texas College	0	–	6	0	–	9
$ – Conference champion; Rankings from NAIA Coaches' Poll

2016 Frontier Conference football standings
	Conf.			Overall
Team	W		L	W		L
No. 7 Montana Tech $^	9	–	1	10	–	2
No. 4 Eastern Oregon ^	8	–	2	10	–	3
No. 20 Montana Western	6	–	4	7	–	4
Southern Oregon	5	–	5	5	–	6
Carroll (MT)	4	–	6	4	–	6
Rocky Mountain	4	–	6	4	–	7
College of Idaho	3	–	7	4	–	7
Montana State–Northern	1	–	9	1	–	9
$ – Conference champion; ^ – NAIA playoff participant; Rankings from NAIA Coaches' Poll

2016 Great Plains Athletic Conference football standings
	Conf.			Overall
Team	W		L	W		L
No. 6 Morningside $^	8	–	0	10	–	2
No. 10 Doane ^	7	–	1	9	–	2
No. 16 Dakota Wesleyan	6	–	2	8	–	3
No. 19 Concordia (NE)	5	–	3	7	–	3
Midland	4	–	4	7	–	4
Northwestern (IA)	3	–	5	3	–	6
Dordt	2	–	6	5	–	6
Hastings	1	–	7	4	–	7
Briar Cliff	0	–	8	1	–	10
$ – Conference champion; ^ – NAIA playoff participant * – Northwestern forfeited a win over Midland.; Rankings from NAIA Coaches' Poll

2016 Heart of America Athletic Conference football standings
	Conf.			Overall
Team	W		L	W		L
North
No. 9 Grand View x^	4	–	1	9	–	3
No. 25 William Penn x	4	–	1	7	–	4
No. 24 Benedictine (KS)	3	–	2	8	–	4
Graceland	3	–	2	5	–	6
Peru State	1	–	4	5	–	6
Culver–Stockton	0	–	5	1	–	10
South
No. 2 Baker x^	5	–	0	14	–	1
No. 11 Missouri Valley ^	4	–	1	9	–	3
MidAmerica Nazarene	3	–	2	6	–	5
Evangel	2	–	3	4	–	7
Central Methodist	1	–	4	2	–	9
Avila	0	–	5	0	–	11
x – Division champion/co-champions; ^ – NAIA playoff participant; Rankings from NAIA Coaches' Poll

2016 Kansas Collegiate Athletic Conference football standings
	Conf.			Overall
Team	W		L	W		L
No. 12 Tabor $^	8	–	1	8	–	3
No. 17 Kansas Wesleyan	7	–	2	9	–	2
Saint Mary (KS)	7	–	2	8	–	3
No. 13 Sterling ^	7	–	2	8	–	3
Friends	5	–	4	6	–	5
Ottawa	4	–	5	4	–	7
Bethel (KS)	3	–	6	3	–	7
Southwestern (KS)	2	–	7	2	–	8
Bethany (KS)	1	–	8	1	–	10
McPherson	1	–	8	1	–	10
$ – Conference champion; ^ – NAIA playoff participant; Rankings from NAIA Coaches' Poll

2016 Mid-South Conference football standings
	Conf.			Overall
Team	W		L	W		L
East Division
No. 25 Georgetown (KY) x	5	–	1	7	–	4
Pikeville x	5	–	1	6	–	5
Union (KY)	4	–	2	5	–	6
Cumberlands (KY)	3	–	3	4	–	6
Kentucky Christian	3	–	3	3	–	8
Bluefield	1	–	5	1	–	10
Cincinnati Christian	0	–	6	0	–	11
West Division
No. 3 Reinhardt x^	5	–	0	13	–	1
No. 8 Lindsey Wilson ^	4	–	1	11	–	2
Faulkner	3	–	2	6	–	4
Cumberland (TN)	2	–	3	5	–	6
Bethel (TN)	1	–	4	7	–	4
Campbellsville	0	–	5	2	–	8
x – Division champion/co-champions; ^ – NAIA playoff participant; Rankings from NAIA Coaches' Poll

2016 Mid-States Football Association standings
	Conf.			Overall
Team	W		L	W		L
Mideast League
No. 5 Marian (IN) x^	6	–	0	11	–	1
No. 1 Saint Francis (IN) ^	5	–	1	13	–	1
Concordia (MI)	4	–	2	7	–	4
Siena Heights	2	–	4	5	–	5
Taylor	2	–	4	4	–	7
Missouri Baptist	2	–	4	3	–	8
Lindenwood–Belleville	0	–	6	0	–	10
Midwest League
No. 15 Robert Morris (IL) x^	5	–	0	7	–	4
Saint Xavier	3	–	2	6	–	4
St. Francis (IL)	2	–	3	5	–	6
Saint Ambrose	2	–	3	4	–	6
Olivet Nazarene	2	–	3	4	–	7
Trinity International	1	–	4	4	–	7
x – League champion/co-champions ^ – NAIA playoff participant; Rankings from NAIA Coaches' Poll

2016 North Star Athletic Association football standings
	Conf.			Overall
Team	W		L	W		L
No. 14 Dickinson State $^	6	–	0	9	–	3
Valley City State	4	–	2	6	–	4
Presentation	3	–	3	7	–	3
Dakota State	3	–	3	6	–	4
Jamestown *	3	–	3	4	–	7
Mayville State	2	–	4	4	–	6
Waldorf	0	–	6	1	–	9
$ – Conference champion; ^ – NAIA playoff participant * – Jamestown later forfeited or vacated all its wins. Valley City State and Waldorf were given wins by forfeit.; Rankings from NAIA Coaches' Poll

2016 Sun Conference football standings
	Conf.			Overall
Team	W		L	W		L
No. 18 Southeastern $^	5	–	0	7	–	3
Warner	4	–	1	8	–	2
Webber International	2	–	2	5	–	4
Point	2	–	3	4	–	6
Edward Waters	1	–	3	3	–	6
Ave Maria	0	–	5	0	–	10
$ – Conference champion; ^ – NAIA playoff participant; Rankings from NAIA Coaches' Poll

2016 NAIA independents football records
	Conf.			Overall
Team	W		L	W		L
Davenport		–		5	–	5
