= 1999 Northwestern Oklahoma State Rangers football team =

American college football season

1999 Northwestern Oklahoma State Rangers football

NAIA national champion

NAIA National Championship Game, W 34-26 vs Georgetown (KY)
- Conference: Independent
- Record: 13–0
- Head coach: Tim Albin (3rd season)
- Offensive coordinator: Garin Higgins (3rd season)

1999 NAIA independents football records
	Conf.			Overall
Team	W		L	W		L
No. 1 NW Oklahoma State ^		–		13	–	0
No. 7 Azusa Pacific ^		–		9	–	3
Southern Oregon		–		7	–	2
Virginia–Wise		–		6	–	3
Peru State		–		3	–	7
^ – NAIA playoff participant

The 1999 Northwestern Oklahoma State Rangers football team was an American football team that represented the Northwestern Oklahoma State University as an independent during the 1999 NAIA football season. In their third season under head coach Tim Albin, the Rangers compiled a perfect 13–0 record and won the NAIA national championship.

In the NAIA National Championship Game, the Rangers faced Georgetown (Kentucky), falling by a 20-0 score at halftime, then coming back for a 34-26 victory. Rangers quarterback Al Hunt tallied 129 rushing yards and 140 passing yards and was named Offensive Player of the Game. Linebacker Daryl Richardson was selected as the Defensive Player of the Game. It was the first national title in Northwestern Oklahoma State program history.

After the season, coach Albin was honored as the NAIA coach of the year by American Football Coach magazine.

The team's perfect season extended the school's winning streak to 18 games, dating back to September 1998.

== Schedule ==
Date	Opponent	Site	Result	Attendance	Source
September 24	Lambuth	Alva, OK	W 39–15		
October 2	Fort Hays State		W 35–7		
November 13	Wayne State (NE)	Ranger Field; Alva, OK	W 71–30	3,150	
November 20	Southwestern (KS)	(NAIA first round)	W 44–10		
November 27	Lambuth	(NAIA quarterfinal)	W 56–13		
December 4	Mary (ND)	(NAIA semifinal)	W 21–6		
December 18	vs. Georgetown (KY)	Jim Carroll Stadium; Savannah, TN (NAIA Championship Game)	W 34–26	6,500 (est)	
