= 2017 NAIA football season =

American college football season

- National Championship: Daytona Beach Municipal Stadium; Daytona Beach, FL; December 16, 2017
- Champion: Saint Francis (IN)
- Player of the Year: Nick Ferrer (quarterback, Saint Francis (IN))

The 2017 NAIA football season was the component of the 2017 college football season organized by the National Association of Intercollegiate Athletics (NAIA) in the United States. The season's playoffs, known as the NAIA Football National Championship, culminated with the championship game on December 17, at Daytona Beach Municipal Stadium in Daytona Beach, Florida. The Saint Francis Cougars defeated the Reinhardt Eagles, 24–13, in the title game to win the program's second consecutive NAIA championship.

== Conference standings ==
2017 Central States Football League standings
	Conf.			Overall
Team	W		L	W		L
No. 13 Langston $^	8	–	0	10	–	1
No. 19 SAGU	7	–	1	8	–	3
No. 24 OK Panhandle State	6	–	2	7	–	3
Arizona Christian	5	–	3	7	–	3
Lyon	4	–	4	6	–	5
Bacone	3	–	5	3	–	8
Texas College	2	–	6	2	–	8
Texas Wesleyan	1	–	7	1	–	10
Wayland Baptist	0	–	8	0	–	10
$ – Conference champion; ^ – NAIA playoff participant; Rankings from NAIA Coaches' Poll

2017 Frontier Conference football standings
	Conf.			Overall
Team	W		L	W		L
No. 4 Southern Oregon $^	10	–	0	12	–	1
Montana Tech	6	–	4	6	–	4
College of Idaho	6	–	4	6	–	5
Rocky Mountain	6	–	4	6	–	5
Carroll (MT)	4	–	6	4	–	6
Eastern Oregon	4	–	6	4	–	6
Montana Western	4	–	6	4	–	7
Montana State–Northern	0	–	10	1	–	10
$ – Conference champion; ^ – NAIA playoff participant; Rankings from NAIA Coaches' Poll

2017 Great Plains Athletic Conference football standings
	Conf.			Overall
Team	W		L	W		L
No. 3 Morningside $^	8	–	0	13	–	1
No. 8 Northwestern (IA) ^	7	–	1	10	–	2
Concordia (NE)	5	–	3	6	–	4
Midland	4	–	4	6	–	4
Dakota Wesleyan	4	–	4	6	–	5
Doane	3	–	5	5	–	5
Dordt	3	–	5	5	–	5
Hastings	2	–	6	5	–	6
Briar Cliff	0	–	8	0	–	11
$ – Conference champion; ^ – NAIA playoff participant; Rankings from NAIA Coaches' Poll

2017 Heart of America Athletic Conference football standings
	Conf.			Overall
Team	W		L	W		L
North
No. 12 Benedictine (KS) x^	4	–	1	9	–	3
No. 11 Grand View x^	4	–	1	9	–	3
Peru State	3	–	2	7	–	4
William Penn	3	–	2	7	–	4
Culver–Stockton	1	–	4	1	–	10
Graceland	0	–	5	1	–	10
South
No. 9 Baker x^	4	–	1	10	–	2
No. 25 Evangel	4	–	1	7	–	4
Missouri Valley	3	–	2	5	–	6
MidAmerica Nazarene	2	–	3	5	–	6
Avila	1	–	4	3	–	8
Central Methodist	1	–	4	2	–	9
x – Division champion/co-champions; ^ – NAIA playoff participant; Rankings from NAIA Coaches' Poll

2017 Kansas Collegiate Athletic Conference football standings
	Conf.			Overall
Team	W		L	W		L
No. 17 Tabor +	8	–	1	8	–	2
No. 16 Sterling +^	8	–	1	9	–	3
No. 21 Kansas Wesleyan	7	–	2	8	–	3
Southwestern (KS)	5	–	4	5	–	6
Bethany (KS)	4	–	5	5	–	5
Friends	4	–	5	4	–	7
Saint Mary (KS)	3	–	6	4	–	7
Ottawa	3	–	6	3	–	8
McPherson	2	–	7	3	–	7
Bethel (KS)	1	–	8	1	–	9
+ – Conference co-champions; ^ – NAIA playoff participant; Rankings from NAIA Coaches' Poll

2017 Mid-South Conference football standings
	Conf.			Overall
Team	W		L	W		L
Appalachian Division
No. 2 Reinhardt x^	6	–	0	12	–	1
Bluefield	4	–	2	6	–	5
Cumberlands (KY)	3	–	3	6	–	4
Union (KY)	3	–	3	5	–	5
Pikeville	3	–	3	5	–	6
Point	1	–	5	3	–	8
St. Andrews	1	–	5	2	–	8
Bluegrass Division
No. 5 Lindsey Wilson x^	6	–	0	11	–	1
No. 7 Georgetown (KY) ^	5	–	1	9	–	2
No. 20 Campbellsville	4	–	2	8	–	2
Cumberland (TN)	3	–	3	7	–	4
Bethel (TN)	2	–	4	3	–	7
Kentucky Christian	1	–	5	1	–	10
Cincinnati Christian	0	–	6	0	–	11
Sun Division
No. 10 Southeastern x^	5	–	0	8	–	2
No. 22 Faulkner	4	–	1	7	–	3
Webber International	3	–	2	5	–	4
Warner	2	–	3	4	–	6
Ave Maria	1	–	4	2	–	8
Edward Waters	0	–	5	0	–	10
x – Division champion/co-champions; ^ – NAIA playoff participant; Rankings from NAIA Coaches' Poll

2017 Mid-States Football Association standings
	Conf.			Overall
Team	W		L	W		L
Mideast League
No. 1 Saint Francis (IN) x^	6	–	0	14	–	0
No. 15 Concordia (MI) ^	5	–	1	9	–	2
No. 18 Marian (IN)	4	–	2	7	–	3
Siena Heights	3	–	3	5	–	5
Taylor	2	–	4	4	–	6
Missouri Baptist	1	–	5	3	–	8
Lindenwood–Belleville	0	–	6	0	–	10
Midwest League
No. 6 Saint Xavier x^	5	–	0	10	–	2
St. Francis (IL)	4	–	1	5	–	5
Olivet Nazarene	2	–	3	6	–	5
St. Ambrose	2	–	3	4	–	6
Trinity International	1	–	4	2	–	7
Robert Morris (IL)	1	–	4	2	–	9
x – League champion/co-champions ^ – NAIA playoff participant; Rankings from NAIA Coaches' Poll

2017 North Star Athletic Association football standings
	Conf.			Overall
Team	W		L	W		L
No. 14 Dickinson State $^	8	–	0	9	–	2
No. 23 Dakota State	6	–	2	8	–	3
Waldorf	5	–	3	7	–	4
Valley City State	4	–	4	5	–	5
Presentation	3	–	5	4	–	6
Jamestown	2	–	6	2	–	9
Mayville State	0	–	8	0	–	11
$ – Conference champion; ^ – NAIA playoff participant * – Jamestown later forfeited or vacated both its wins. Waldorf was given a win by forfeit.; Rankings from NAIA Coaches' Poll
