= 2016 NAIA football national championship =

The 2016 NAIA football national championship was a four-round, sixteen team tournament played between November 19 and December 17 of 2016. The tournament concluded on December 17 with a single game, played as the 61st Annual NAIA Football National Championship Presented by Waste Pro. Waste Pro became the newest title game sponsor in an announcement made October 31, 2015. The game featured two teams that had never before won a national championship, the undefeated #2 Baker Wildcats facing the once-beaten #4 Saint Francis Cougars.

The championship game was played at Municipal Stadium in Daytona Beach, Florida. This was the 3rd time the championship game was played at this venue after the prior six games were played at Barron Stadium in Rome, Georgia. A total of sixteen teams were selected to participate in the single-elimination tournament from across the country. The field included ten conference champions who received automatic bids. The field was filled with at-large selections that were awarded to the highest ranked teams that were not conference champions. First-round seeding was based on the final edition of the 2016 NAIA Coaches' Poll, with certain minor modifications given based on geographic considerations. Each subsequent round was re-seeded based on the rankings of all teams advancing to that round.

Quarterfinal pairings were announced by the NAIA on November 20, a day after the first round results were known.

Semifinal pairings were confirmed by the NAIA on November 26, soon after completion of the day's quarterfinal games.

Junior quarterback Logan Brettell of Baker was awarded the Rawlings Award for most valuable player in the NAIA prior to the championship. The St. Francis Cougars won the NAIA national championship, defeating Baker 38-17.

== Postseason ==
=== Playoff bracket ===
2016 Waste Pro NAIA Football National Championship
| Saint Francis Cougars | Baker Wildcats |
| (12–1) | (14–0) |
| 38 | 17 |
| Head coach: Kevin Donley | Head coach: Mike Grossner |
| Coaches 4 | Coaches 2 |
| | 1 | 2 | 3 | 4 | Total |
|---|---|---|---|---|---|
| Saint Francis | 10 | 7 | 7 | 14 | 38 |
| Baker | 3 | 0 | 7 | 7 | 17 |
- Date: December 17, 2016
- Season: 2016
- Stadium: Municipal Stadium
- Location: Daytona Beach, Florida
- MVP: Seth Coate (WR, Saint Francis) (Offensive); Lucas Sparks (DE, Saint Francis) (Defensive)
- Referee: David White
- Attendance: 2,500

United States TV coverage
- Network: ESPN3
- Announcers: Drew Fellios; Forrest Conoly

=== Scoring Summary ===
Scoring summary

| Quarter | Time | Drive | | | Team | Scoring information | Score | |
| Quarter | Time | Plays | Yards | TOP | Team | Scoring information | Saint Francis Cougars | Baker Wildcats |
|---|---|---|---|---|---|---|---|---|
| 1 | 12:18 | 12 | 67 | 2:42 | Baker Wildcats | 26-yard field goal by Clarence Clark | 0 | 3 |
| 1 | 8:22 | 7 | 56 | 3:56 | Saint Francis Cougars | Seth Coate 5-yard touchdown reception from Nick Ferrer, Ryan Nix kick Good | 7 | 3 |
| 1 | 0:49 | 13 | 36 | 6:10 | Saint Francis Cougars | 44-yard field goal by Ryan Nix | 10 | 3 |
| 2 | 1:57 | 1 | 39 | 0:07 | Saint Francis Cougars | Justin Green 39-yard touchdown run, Ryan Nix kick Good | 17 | 3 |
| 3 | 6:35 | 8 | 70 | 2:45 | Baker Wildcats | Damon Nolan 13-yard touchdown reception from Logan Brettell, Clarence Clark kick Good | 17 | 10 |
| 3 | 0:44 | 6 | 87 | 2:42 | Saint Francis Cougars | Seth Coate 59-yard touchdown reception from Nick Ferrer, Ryan Nix kick Good | 24 | 10 |
| 4 | 12:21 | 3 | 80 | 1:09 | Saint Francis Cougars | Seth Coate 36-yard touchdown reception from Nick Ferrer, Ryan Nix kick Good | 31 | 10 |
| 4 | 3:39 | 12 | 29 | 3:42 | Baker Wildcats | Cornell Brown 1-yard touchdown run, Clarence Clark kick Good | 31 | 17 |
| 4 | 2:48 | 2 | 37 | 0:51 | Saint Francis Cougars | P.J. Dean 28-yard touchdown run, Ryan Nix kick Good | 38 | 17 |
| "TOP" = time of possession. For other American football terms, see Glossary of American football. | | | | | | | Saint Francis Cougars | Baker Wildcats |

1st Round; November 19
2 | Baker (KS) (11–0) | 44
13 | Sterling (KS) (8–2) | 21
8 | Lindsey Wilson (KY) (10–1) | 34*
10 | Grand View (IA) (9–2) | 27
1 | Marian (IN) (10–0) | 32
15 | Robert Morris (IL) (7–3) | 7
7 | Doane (NE) (9–1) | 28
9 | Eastern Oregon (8–2) | 34
3 | Reinhardt (GA) (11–0) | 52
20 | Southeastern (FL) (6–2) | 22
6 | Montana Tech (9–1) | 28
14 | Dickinson State (ND) (9–2) | 21
4 | Saint Francis (IN) (9–1) | 79
11 | Missouri Valley (MO) (9–2) | 20
5 | Morningside (IA) (9–1) | 65
12 | Tabor (KS) (8–2) | 17

Quarterfinals; November 26
2 | Baker (KS) (12–0) | 42
8 | Lindsey Wilson (KY) (11–1) | 27
1 | Marian (IN) (11–0) | 0
9 | Eastern Oregon (9–2) | 17
3 | Reinhardt (GA) (12–0) | 27
6 | Montana Tech (10–1) | 0
4 | Saint Francis (IN) (10–1) | 42
5 | Morningside (IA) (10–1) | 28

Semifinals; December 3
2 | Baker (KS) (13–0) | 45
9 | Eastern Oregon (10–2) | 41
3 | Reinhardt (GA) (13–0) | 24
4 | Saint Francis (IN) (11–1) | 42

Championship; December 17
2 | Baker (KS) (14–0) | 17
4 | Saint Francis (IN) (12–1) | 38

* denotes OT

=== Bowl games ===
| Game | Date | Location | Winning Team (Record) | Losing Team (Record) | Score | Note |
|---|---|---|---|---|---|---|
| Victory Bowl | December 3 | N/A | Warner; 8-2 (4-1) | None | N/A | The NCCAA could not find a second team available to play |
