= 2017 NAIA football national championship =

The 2017 NAIA football national championship was a four-round, sixteen team tournament played between November 18 and December 16 of 2017. The tournament will conclude on December 16 with a single game, played as the 62nd Annual NAIA Football National Championship. The game featured two undefeated teams that met in the semifinal round of the 2016 tournament, including the defending national champions, the #1-ranked Saint Francis Cougars. Their opponent was the #2-ranked Reinhardt Eagles, in only the 5th year of the program's existence. In the end, it was Saint Francis that prevailed by a final score of 24–13. This was only the 5th time a team has managed back-to-back championships in the history of NAIA football.

The championship game was played at Municipal Stadium in Daytona Beach, Florida. This was the 4th consecutive time the championship game was played at this venue after the prior six games were played at Barron Stadium in Rome, Georgia. A total of sixteen teams were selected to participate in the single-elimination tournament from across the country. The field included twelve conference champions who received automatic bids. The field was filled with at-large selections that were awarded to the highest ranked teams that were not conference champions. First-round seedings were based on the final edition of the 2017 NAIA Coaches' Poll, with certain minor modifications given based on geographic considerations. Each subsequent round was re-seeded based on the rankings of all teams advancing to that round.

Quarterfinal pairings were announced by the NAIA on November 18, after the first round results were known.

Semifinal pairings were confirmed by the NAIA on November 25, soon after completion of the day's quarterfinal games.

Saint Francis senior quarterback Nick Ferrer was awarded the Rawlings Award for most valuable player in the NAIA prior to the championship.

== Postseason ==
=== Playoff bracket ===
2017 NAIA Football National Championship
Reinhardt Eagles	Saint Francis Cougars
(12–0)	(13–0)
13	24
Head coach: James Miller	Head coach: Kevin Donley
Coaches 2	Coaches 1
	1	2	3	4	Total
Reinhardt	0	7	6	0	13
Saint Francis	17	7	0	0	24
- Date: December 16, 2017
- Season: 2017
- Stadium: Municipal Stadium
- Location: Daytona Beach, Florida
- MVP: Justin Green (RB, Saint Francis)(Offensive); Eric Dunten (ILB, Saint Francis) (Defensive)
- Attendance: 4,432

United States TV coverage
- Network: ESPN3
- Announcers: Drew Fellios; Forrest Conoly; Kristen Bedard

=== Scoring Summary ===
Scoring summary

Quarter	Time	Drive			Team	Scoring information	Score	
Quarter	Time	Plays	Yards	TOP	Team	Scoring information	Reinhardt Eagles	Saint Francis Cougars
1	8:48	8	25	3:09	Saint Francis Cougars	26-yard field goal by Gavin Gardner	0	3
1	5:10	1	80	0:13	Saint Francis Cougars	Justin Green 80-yard touchdown run, Gavin Gardner kick Good	0	10
1	0:46	3	54	1:09	Saint Francis Cougars	Duke Blackwell 16-yard touchdown reception from Nick Ferrer, Gavin Gardner kick Good	0	17
2	12:20	5	59	2:21	Saint Francis Cougars	Justin Green 10-yard touchdown run, Gavin Gardner kick Good	0	24
2	8:29	9	51	3:51	Reinhardt Eagles	Trevae Cain 2-yard touchdown run, Nick Marquez kick Good	7	24
3	5:06	10	60	4:39	Reinhardt Eagles	Qua Stocks 6-yard touchdown run, Nick Marquez kick Failed	13	24
"TOP" = time of possession. For other American football terms, see Glossary of American football.							Reinhardt Eagles	Saint Francis Cougars

1st Round; November 18
1	Saint Francis (IN) (10–0)	26
15	Benedictine (KS) (9–2)	21
7	Langston (10–0)	7
10	Northwestern (IA) (9–1)	55
3	Morningside (11–0)	63
16	Sterling (9–2)	7
8	Saint Xavier (9–1)	39
11	Grand View (9–2)	23
2	Reinhardt (9–0)	39
14	Concordia (MI) (9–1)	10
6	Baker) (10–1)	33
12	Georgetown (KY) (8–1)	36
4	Lindsey Wilson (10–0)	63
9	Southeastern (8–1)	49
5	Southern Oregon (10–0)	55
13	Dickinson State (9–1)	24

Quarterfinals; November 25
1	Saint Francis (IN) (11–0)	30
10	Northwestern (IA) (10–1)	3
3	Morningside (12–0)	52
8	Saint Xavier (10–1)	7
2	Reinhardt (10–0)	17
12	Georgetown (9–1)	10
4	Lindsey Wilson (11–0)	29
5	Southern Oregon (11–0)	34

Semifinals; December 2
1	Saint Francis (IN) (12–0)	43
3	Morningside (13–0)	36
2	Reinhardt (11–0)	37*
5	Southern Oregon (12–0)	34

Championship; December 16
1	Saint Francis (IN) (13–0)	24
2	Reinhardt (12–0)	13
