= 1999 NAIA football national championship =

1999 NAIA Football Championship
	1st	2nd	3rd	4th	Total
Northwestern Oklahoma State Rangers	0	0	21	13	34
Georgetown (KY)	7	13	0	6	26
- Date: December 18, 1999
- Stadium: Jim Carroll Stadium
- City: Savannah, Tennessee
- MOP (Offense): Al Hunt, Northwestern Oklahoma State
- MOP (Defense): Daryl Richardson Hunt, Northwestern Oklahoma State
- Officials: Dwight Neibling
- Attendance: 6,500
- Network: Fox Sports Net
- Announcers: Tom Hedrick, Stan Weber

The 1999 NAIA football championship series concluded on December 18, 1999, with the championship game played at Jim Carroll Stadium in Savannah, Tennessee. The game was won by the Northwestern Oklahoma State Rangers over the Georgetown Tigers by a score of 34–26.

== Scoring Summary ==
Scoring summary

Quarter	Time	Drive			Team	Scoring information	Score	
Quarter	Time	Plays	Yards	TOP	Team	Scoring information	Northwestern Oklahoma State Rangers	Georgetown (KY) Tigers
1	10:03	10	65	4:57	Georgetown (KY) Tigers	Creed Gann 25-yard touchdown reception from Eddie Eviston, Kevin Davis kick Good	0	7
2	7:30	7	93	2:31	Georgetown (KY) Tigers	Cody Brown 51-yard touchdown reception from Eddie Eviston, Kevin Davis kick Good	0	14
2	1:17	10	20	3:38	Georgetown (KY) Tigers	29-yard field goal by Kevin Davis	0	17
2	0:00	9	46	1:00	Georgetown (KY) Tigers	23-yard field goal by Kevin Davis	0	20
3	10:40	5	41	1:48	Northwestern Oklahoma State Rangers	Brandon Christenson 7-yard touchdown reception from Al Hunt, Danny Polmounter kick Good	7	20
3	8:38	2	19	0:29	Northwestern Oklahoma State Rangers	Gary Manuel 8-yard touchdown run, Danny Polmounter kick Good	14	20
3	0:36	11	75	5:40	Northwestern Oklahoma State Rangers	Charles McBride 1-yard touchdown run, Danny Polmounter kick Good	21	20
4	7:26	5	21	2:33	Northwestern Oklahoma State Rangers	Al Hunt 4-yard touchdown run, Danny Polmounter kick Good	28	20
4	3:17	1	73	0:11	Northwestern Oklahoma State Rangers	Willie Spears 73-yard touchdown reception from Al Hunt, Danny Polmounter kick Failed	34	20
4	2:09	3	79	1:08	Georgetown (KY) Tigers	Kenan McWhorter 26-yard touchdown reception from Eddie Eviston, Kevin Davis kick Failed	34	26
"TOP" = time of possession. For other American football terms, see Glossary of American football.							Northwestern Oklahoma State Rangers	Georgetown (KY) Tigers

== Tournament bracket ==
1st Round; November 20
1	Georgetown (KY)	38
12	Saint Francis (IN)	0
5	Taylor (IN)	38
9	Missouri Valley	12
3	Hastings (NE)	45
13	Bethany (KS)	23
7	Azusa Pacific	31
15	Doane (NE)	12
2	NW Oklahoma State	44
17	Southwestern (KS)	10
6	McKendree (IL)	38
14	Lambuth (TN)	41
4	Mary (ND)	34
11	Huron (SD)	3
8	Dickinson State	32
10	Rocky Mountain (MT)	38

Quarterfinals; November 27
1	Georgetown (KY)	55
5	Taylor (IN)	3
3	Hastings (NE)	35
7	Azusa Pacific	38
2	NW Oklahoma State	56
14	Lambuth (TN)	13
4	Mary (ND)	7
10	Rocky Mountain (MT)	3

Semifinals; December 4
1	Georgetown (KY)	66
7	Azusa Pacific	35
2	NW Oklahoma State	21
4	Mary (ND)	6

Championship; December 18
1	Georgetown (KY)	26
2	NW Oklahoma State	34

- * denotes OT.
