= Mid-States Football Association =

U.S. college athletic conference

- Association: NAIA
- Founded: 1993; 33 years ago
- Commissioner: Ron Korfmacher
- Sports fielded: 1 (football only)
- No. of teams: 12 (14 in 2027)
- Region: Midwestern United States
- Website: mid-statesfootball.org

Locations
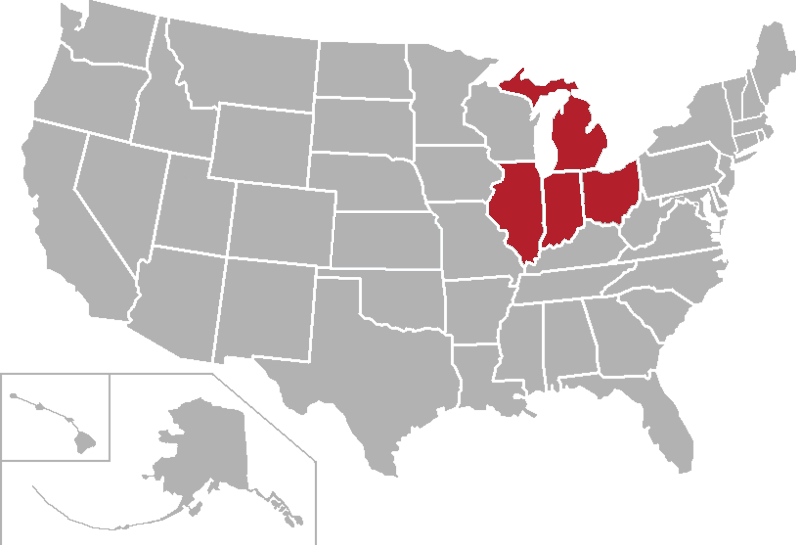

The Mid-States Football Association (MSFA) is a college athletic conference affiliated with the National Association of Intercollegiate Athletics (NAIA). The conference sponsors only football. Member institutions are located in Illinois, Indiana, Michigan, and Ohio. The MSFA was organized in 1993, and on-field competition began in 1994. The conference is divided into two leagues, the Mideast League and the Midwest League. The two MSFA league champions each earn an automatic bid to the NAIA football national championship playoffs. MSFA member schools have won eight NAIA football national championships.

For other sports, MSFA-member schools are affiliated with a variety of other conferences including the Chicagoland Collegiate Athletic Conference, the Crossroads League, the River States Conference, and the Wolverine–Hoosier Athletic Conference.

== History ==
Mid-States Football Association
Location of MSFA members:
Mideast League
Midwest League
Future

=== Chronological timeline ===
- 1994 – The Mid-States Football Association (MSFA) was founded. Charter members included the following, beginning the 1994 fall season (1994–95 academic year):
  - Geneva College, Malone College (now Malone University), Tiffin University, Urbana University, and Westminster College representing the Mideast League
  - and the University of Findlay, Lindenwood College (now Lindenwood University), Olivet Nazarene University, Saint Xavier University, Taylor University and Trinity International University representing the Midwest League
- 1996 – Lindenwood left the MSFA to move its football program with its other sports when it joined the Heart of America Athletic Conference (HAAC) after the 1995 fall season (1995–96 academic year).
- 1996 – Tri-State University (now Trine University) and Walsh University joined the MSFA to represent the Mideast League, while Iowa Wesleyan College (later Iowa Wesleyan University) and St. Ambrose University joined the MSFA to represent the Midwest League, all effective in the 1996 fall season (1996–97 academic year).
- 1998 – Findlay and Westminster (Pa.) left the MSFA to move their football programs to the Midwest Intercollegiate Football Conference (MIFC), along with their other sports when both joined the Division II ranks of the National Collegiate Athletic Association (NCAA) and the Great Lakes Intercollegiate Athletic Conference (GLIAC) after the 1997 fall season (1997–98 academic year).
- 1998 – The University of Saint Francis of Indiana joined the MSFA to represent the Mideast League, while McKendree College (now McKendree University) joined the MSFA to represent the Midwest League, both effective in the 1998 fall season (1998–99 academic year).
- 1999 – St. Ambrose opted to not compete in the MSFA for the 1999 fall season (1999–2000 academic year).
- 1999 – The University of St. Francis of Illinois joined the MSFA to represent the Mideast League in the 1999 fall season (1999–2000 academic year).
- 2000 – St. Ambrose returned to the MSFA in the 2000 fall season (2000–01 academic year).
- 2002 – Tiffin left the MSFA to join the Independent Football Alliance (IFA) after the 2001 fall season (2001–02 academic year).
- 2002 – William Penn University joined the MSFA to represent the Midwest League in the 2002 fall season (2002–03 academic year).
- 2003 – Trine left the MSFA to move its football program with its other sports when it joined the NCAA Division III ranks after the 2002 fall season (2002–03 academic year).
- 2003 – Quincy University joined the MSFA to represent the Mideast League in the 2003 fall season (2003–04 academic year).
- 2004 – Ohio Dominican University joined the MSFA to represent the Mideast League in the 2004 fall season (2004–05 academic year).
- 2006 – Quincy moved to the Midwest League in the 2006 fall season (2006–07 academic year).
- 2007 – Geneva left the MSFA to move its football program with its other sports when it joined the NCAA Division III ranks and the Presidents' Athletic Conference (PAC) after the 2006 fall season (2006–07 academic year).
- 2007 – Marian University joined the MSFA to represent the Mideast League in the 2007 fall season (2007–08 academic year).
- 2007 – Saint Xavier (Ill.) moved to the Mideast League in the 2007 fall season (2007–08 academic year).
- 2008 – Urbana left the MSFA to move its football program with its other sports when it joined the NCAA Division II ranks after the 2007 fall season (2007–08 academic year).
- 2009 – Ohio Dominican left the MSFA to move its football program with its other sports when it joined the NCAA Division II ranks after the 2008 fall season (2008–09 academic year).
- 2009 – Grand View University and Waldorf University joined the MSFA to represent the Midwest League in the 2009 fall season (2009–10 academic year).
- 2009 – Olivet Nazarene and Trinity International moved to the Mideast League in the 2009 fall season (2009–10 academic year).
- 2011 – Three institutions left the MSFA to move their football programs with their other sports when they joined the NCAA Division II ranks, all effective after the 2010 fall season (2010–11 academic year):
  - Malone and Walsh to the GLIAC
  - and McKendree to the Great Lakes Valley Conference (GLVC)
- 2011 – Concordia University Ann Arbor joined the MSFA to represent in the Mideast League in the 2011 fall season (2011–12 academic year).
- 2011 – Quincy returned to the Mideast League, while Olivet Nazarene and Trinity International went back to the Midwest League in the 2011 fall season (2011–12 academic year).
- 2012 – Two institutions left the MSFA to move their football programs with their other sports when they joined the NCAA ranks, both effective after the 2011 fall season (2011–12 academic year):
  - Quincy to D-II and the GLVC
  - and Iowa Wesleyan to D-III and eventually to the St. Louis Intercollegiate Athletic Conference (SLIAC)
- 2012 – Siena Heights University joined the MSFA to represent in the Mideast League in the 2012 fall season (2012–13 academic year).
- 2013 – Robert Morris University Illinois joined the MSFA to represent in the Mideast League in the 2013 fall season (2013–14 academic year).
- 2013 – Saint Xavier (Ill.) returned to the Mideast League, while Saint Francis (Ill.) moved to the Midwest League, both effective in the 2013 fall season (2013–14 academic year).
- 2014 – Waldorf left the MSFA to join the North Star Athletic Association (NSAA) as an affiliate member for football after the 2013 fall season (2013–14 academic year).
- 2015 – Grand View and William Penn left the MSFA to move their football programs with their other sports when both joined the HAAC after the 2014 fall season (2014–15 academic year).
- 2015 – Lindenwood University – Belleville and Missouri Baptist University joined the MSFA to represent the Mideast League in the 2015 fall season (2015–16 academic year).
- 2015 – Saint Francis (Ill.) went back to the Mideast League in the 2015 fall season (2015–16 academic year).
- 2019 – Lindenwood–Belleville left the MSFA after the 2018 fall season (2018–19 academic year).
- 2019 – Indiana Wesleyan University and Lawrence Technological University joined the MSFA to represent the Mideast League in the 2019 fall season (2019–20 academic year).
- 2019 – Missouri Baptist moved to the Midwest League in the 2019 fall season (2019–20 academic year).
- 2020 – Robert Morris (Ill.) left the MSFA after the 2019 fall season (2019–20 academic year).
- 2020 – Madonna University joined the MSFA to represent the Mideast League, while Roosevelt University joined the MSFA to represent the Midwest League, both effective in the 2020 fall season (2020–21 academic year).
- 2021 – Judson University joined the MSFA to represent the Midwest League in the 2021 fall season (2021–22 academic year).
- 2023 – Missouri Baptist left the MSFA to move their football program to the HAAC as a football associate after the 2022 fall season (2022–23 academic year).
- 2023 – Trinity International left the MSFA, coinciding with the closure of its residential campus at the end of the spring semester in favor of online undergraduate programs.
- 2024 – Two institutions left the MSFA to move their football programs, both effective after the 2023 fall season (2023–24 academic year):
  - Roosevelt to join the NCAA D-II ranks and the GLIAC
  - and St. Ambrose to join the HAAC as a football associate
- 2024 – Defiance College joined the MSFA to represent in the Mideast League in the 2024 fall season (2024–25 academic year).
- 2024 – Marian and Saint Francis (Ind.) moved to the Midwest League in the 2024 fall season (2024–25 academic year).
- 2025 – Concordia–Ann Arbor will leave the MSFA after the 2024 fall season (2024–25 academic year).
- 2026 – Siena Heights left the MSFA upon the closure of the university after the 2025–26 academic year.
- 2026 – Saint Mary-of-the-Woods College joined the MSFA to represent the Midwest League in the 2026 fall season (2026–27 academic year).
- 2026 – Saint Francis (Ind.) moved to the Mideast League in the 2026 fall season (2026–27 academic year).
- 2027 – Calumet College of St. Joseph and Midway University will join the MSFA in the 2027 fall season (2027–28 academic year).

== Member schools ==
=== Current members ===
The MSFA currently has 12 member schools, all of them are private schools.

Institution	Location	Founded	Affiliation	Enrollment	Nickname	Joined (Note: Represents the calendar year when fall sports competition begins.)	Primary conference
Mideast League
Defiance College	Defiance, Ohio	1850	United Church of Christ	511	Yellow Jackets	2024	Wolverine–Hoosier (WHAC)
Indiana Wesleyan University	Marion, Indiana	1920	Wesleyan Church	14,957	Wildcats	2019	Crossroads
Lawrence Technological University	Southfield, Michigan	1932	Nonsectarian	3,260	Blue Devils	2019	Wolverine–Hoosier (WHAC)
Madonna University	Livonia, Michigan	1930	Catholic	2,054	Crusaders	2020	Wolverine–Hoosier (WHAC)
University of Saint Francis (Ind.)	Fort Wayne, Indiana	1890	Catholic	1,852	Cougars	1998	Crossroads
Taylor University	Upland, Indiana	1846	Nondenominational	2,398	Trojans	1994	Crossroads
Midwest League
Judson University	Elgin, Illinois	1963	American Baptist	1,058	Eagles	2021	Chicagoland (CCAC)
Marian University	Indianapolis, Indiana	1851	Catholic	3,586	Knights	2007	Crossroads
Olivet Nazarene University	Bourbonnais, Illinois	1907	Nazarene	3,275	Tigers	1994	Chicagoland (CCAC)
University of St. Francis (Ill.)	Joliet, Illinois	1920	Catholic	3,185	Fighting Saints	1999	Chicagoland (CCAC)
Saint Mary-of-the-Woods College	Saint Mary-of-the-Woods, Indiana	1840	Catholic	1,227	Pomeroys	2026	River States (RSC)
Saint Xavier University	Chicago, Illinois	1846	Catholic	3,457	Cougars	1994	Chicagoland (CCAC)

=== Future members ===
Institution	Location	Founded	Affiliation	Enrollment	Nickname	Joining	Primary conference
Calumet College of St. Joseph	Whiting, Indiana	1951	Catholic (C.PP.S.)	658	Crimson Wave	2027	Chicagoland (CCAC)
Midway University	Midway, Kentucky	1847	Disciples of Christ	1,945	Eagles	2027	River States (RSC)

=== Former members ===
The MSFA has 23 former member schools, all of them were private schools.

Institution	Location	Founded	Affiliation	Enrollment	Nickname	Joined (Note: Represents the calendar year when fall sports competition begins.)	Left (Note: Represents the calendar year when spring sports competition ends.)	Primary conference when joining the MSFA	Primary conference
Concordia University (Mich.)	Ann Arbor, Michigan	1963	Lutheran LCMS	1,351	Cardinals	2011	2025	Wolverine–Hoosier (WHAC)	Discontinued athletics in 2025
University of Findlay	Findlay, Ohio	1882	Churches of God	5,057	Oilers	1994	1998	Great Lakes (GLIAC) (Note: Currently an NCAA Division II athletic conference.)	Great Midwest (G-MAC)
Geneva College	Beaver Falls, Pennsylvania	1848	Reformed	1,258	Golden; Tornadoes	1994	2007	Keystone–Empire (KECC)	Presidents' (PAC) (Note: Currently an NCAA Division III athletic conference.)
Grand View University	Des Moines, Iowa	1896	Lutheran ELCA	1,796	Vikings	2009	2015	Midwest (MCC)	Heart of America (HAAC)
Iowa Wesleyan College	Mount Pleasant, Iowa	1842	United; Methodist	N/A	Tigers	1996	2012	Midwest (MCC)	Closed in 2023
Lindenwood University	St. Charles, Missouri	1827	Presbyterian (PCUSA)	7,288	Lions	1994	1996	Heart of America (HAAC)	Ohio Valley (OVC) (Note: Currently an NCAA Division I athletic conference.)
Lindenwood University–Belleville	Belleville, Illinois	2003	Presbyterian (PCUSA)	N/A	Lynx	2015	2019	American Midwest	Closed in 2020
Malone University	Canton, Ohio	1892	Evangelical	1,205	Pioneers	1994	2011	American Mideast	Great Midwest (G-MAC)
McKendree University	Lebanon, Illinois	1828	United; Methodist	2,075	Bearcats	1998	2011	American Midwest	Great Lakes Valley (GLVC)
Missouri Baptist University	St. Louis, Missouri	1828	Southern Baptist	5,641	Spartans	2015	2023	American Midwest	Heart of America (HAAC)
Ohio Dominican University	Columbus, Ohio	1911	Catholic (OP)	1,258	Panthers	2004	2009	American Mideast	Great Midwest (G-MAC)
Quincy University	Quincy, Illinois	1860	Catholic (Franciscan)	1,280	Hawks	2003	2012	Great Lakes Valley (GLVC)	
Robert Morris University	Chicago, Illinois	1913	Nonsectarian	N/A	Eagles	2013	2020	Chicagoland (CCAC)	N/A (Note: Robert Morris (Ill.) was merged into Roosevelt University after the 2019 fall season (2019–20 school year).)
Roosevelt University	Chicago, Illinois	1945	Nonsectarian	4,015	Lakers	2020	2024	Chicagoland (CCAC)	Great Lakes (GLIAC)
St. Ambrose University	Davenport, Iowa	1882	Catholic	2,703	Fighting Bees	1996 (Note: St. Ambrose didn't compete in the MSFA during the 1999 fall season (1999–2000 school year).)	2024	Midwest (MCC)	Chicagoland (CCAC)
Siena Heights University	Adrian, Michigan	1919	Catholic	1,832	Saints	2012	2026	Wolverine–Hoosier (WHAC)	Closed in 2026
Tiffin University	Tiffin, Ohio	1888	Nonsectarian	3,598	Dragons	1994	2002	American Mideast	Great Midwest (G-MAC)
Trine University	Angola, Indiana	1884	Nonsectatian	4,471	Thunder	1996	2003	Wolverine–Hoosier (WHAC)	Michigan (MIAA)
Trinity International University	Deerfield, Illinois	1897	Evangelical	852	Trojans	1994	2023	Chicagoland (CCAC)	N/A (Note: Trinity International closed their residential campus after 2022–23 school year and now it only has online modalities.)
Urbana University	Urbana, Ohio	1850	Nonsectarian	N/A	Blue Knights	1994	2008	American Mideast	Closed in 2020
Waldorf College	Forest City, Iowa	1903	For-profit (Note: Formerly affiliated with the Evangelical Lutheran Church in America (ELCA) until 2010.)	2,657	Warriors	2009	2014	Midwest (MCC)	Great Plains (GPAC)
Walsh University	North Canton, Ohio	1960	Catholic (Diocese of Youngstown)	2,160	Cavaliers	1996	2011	American Mideast	Great Midwest (G-MAC)
Westminster College	New Wilmington, Pennsylvania	1852	Presbyterian (PCUSA)	1,203	Titans	1994	1998	Keystone–Empire (KECC)	Presidents' (PAC)
William Penn University	Oskaloosa, Iowa	1873	Quakers	1,536	Statesmen	2002	2015	Midwest (MCC)	Heart of America (HAAC)

=== Membership timeline ===
Mideast League Midwest League

== National Championship appearances ==
Year	MSFA member	Opponent	Result	Score
1995	Findlay (OH)	Central Washington	Tie	21–21
1997	Findlay (OH)	Willamette	Won	14–7
1998	Olivet Nazarene (IL)	Azusa Pacific (CA)	Lost	14–17
2004	Saint Francis (IN)	Carroll (MT)	Lost	13–15 ^{2OT}
2005	Saint Francis (IN)	Carroll (MT)	Lost	10–27
2006	Saint Francis (IN)	Sioux Falls (SD)	Lost	19–23
2011	Saint Xavier (IL)	Carroll (MT)	Won	24–20
2012	Marian (IN)	Morningside (IA)	Won	30–27 ^{OT}
2013	Grand View (IA)	Cumberlands (KY)	Won	35–23
2014	Marian (IN)	Southern Oregon	Lost	31–55
2015	Marian (IN)	Southern Oregon	Won	31–14
2016	Saint Francis (IN)	Baker (KS)	Won	38–17
2017	Saint Francis (IN)	Reinhardt (GA)	Won	24–13
2019	Marian (IN)	Morningside	Lost	38–40
