= Dennis McCulloch =

American football coach (born c. 1964)

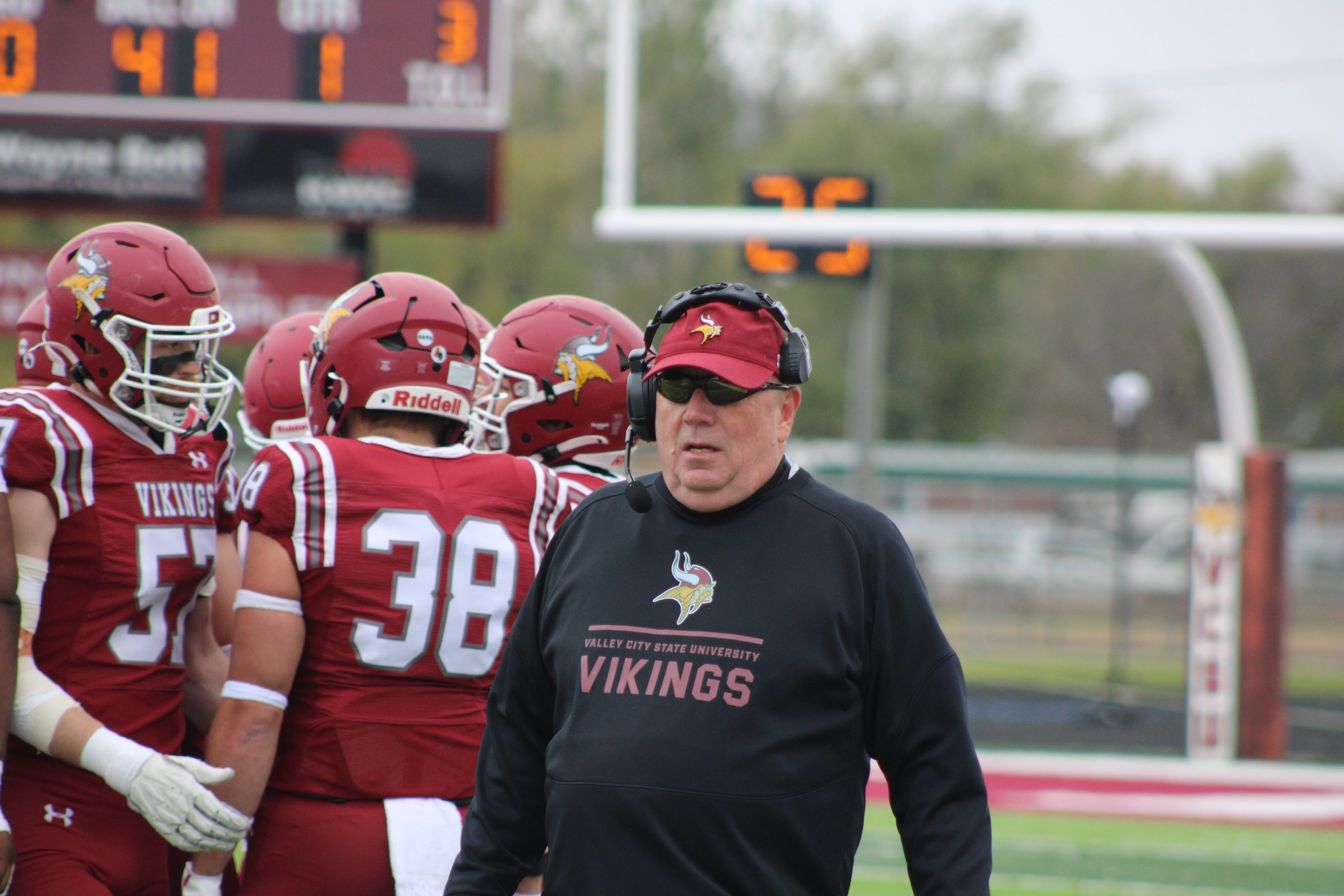

Current position
- Title: Athletic director & head coach
- Team: Valley City State
- Conference: Frontier
- Record: 173–127

Biographical details
- Born: March 8, 1963 (age 63); Milbank, South Dakota, U.S.
- Education: Northern State University (B.S. 1987) (M.S. 1989)

Coaching career (HC unless noted)
- 1988–1989: Northern State (GA)
- 1990–1992: Northern State (LB/DL/DB)
- 1993: Frazee HS (MN)
- 1994–1996: Valley City State (DC)
- 1997–present: Valley City State

Administrative career (AD unless noted)
- 2009–2016: Valley City State (assistant AD)
- 2016: Valley City State (interim AD)
- 2017–2022: Valley City State (assistant AD)
- 2022: Valley City State (interim AD)
- 2023–present: Valley City State

Head coaching record
- Overall: 173–127 (college)
- Tournaments: 0–4 (NAIA playoffs)

Accomplishments and honors

Championships
- 3 DAC (2000, 2005, 2011); 2 NSAA (2013–2014)

Awards
- 2× NSAA Coach of the Year (2013–2014)

Dennis J. McCulloch (born c. 1964) is an American college football coach and athletic director. He is the athletic director and head football coach for Valley City State University, holding the position of head football coach since 1997 and athletic director since 2023. He also coached for Northern State and was the head football coach for Frazee High School in 1993.

In 2021, McCulloch was voted as the president of the NAIA Football Coaches Association.

== Head coaching record ==
=== College ===
Year	Team	Overall	Conference	Standing	Bowl/playoffs	NAIA Coaches'^{#}
Valley City State Vikings (North Dakota College Athletic Conference) (1997–1999)
1997	Valley City State	5–5	2–4	5th		
1998	Valley City State	0–10	0–6	7th		
1999	Valley City State	7–2	3–2	T–2nd		23
Valley City State Vikings (Dakota Athletic Conference) (2000–2011)
2000	Valley City State	9–2	8–1	T–1st	L NAIA First Round	10
2001	Valley City State	9–2	8–1	2nd	L NAIA First Round	13
2002	Valley City State	7–3	6–3	4th		
2003	Valley City State	5–5	4–5	T–5th		
2004	Valley City State	5–5	5–4	T–4th		
2005	Valley City State	7–3	6–1	T–1st		22
2006	Valley City State	6–4	4–3	T–4th		
2007	Valley City State	4–6	3–4	T–4th		
2008	Valley City State	5–5	3–4	T–5th		
2009	Valley City State	3–7	3–5	T–5th		
2010	Valley City State	4–6	3–5	6th		
2011	Valley City State	9–2	6–0	1st	L NAIA First Round	16
Valley City State Vikings (NAIA independent) (2012)
2012	Valley City State	7–3				24
Valley City State Vikings (North Star Athletic Association) (2013–2024)
2013	Valley City State	5–5	3–1	T–1st		
2014	Valley City State	9–2	6–0	1st	L NAIA First Round	17
2015	Valley City State	7–3	4–2	T–2nd		
2016	Valley City State	6–4	4–2	2nd		
2017	Valley City State	5–5	4–4	4th		
2018	Valley City State	6–4	5–2	T–2nd		
2019	Valley City State	7–3	5–2	T–2nd		
2020–21	Valley City State	5–2	5–2	2nd		
2021	Valley City State	8–2	6–2	2nd		
2022	Valley City State	5–5	4–2	T–2nd		
2023	Valley City State	7–3	6–2	2nd		
2024	Valley City State	3–7	2–6	5th		
Valley City State Vikings (Frontier Conference) (2025–present)
2025	Valley City State	6–4	3–3	4th (East)		
2026	Valley City State	2–8	1–5	6th (East)		
Valley City State:		173–127	122–82			
Total:		173–127				
National championship Conference title Conference division title or championship game berth
