= Bill Cronin (American football coach) =

American football coach

Coaching career (HC unless noted)
- 1978–1980: Carmel JHS
- 1981: Anderson (IN) (assistant)
- 1982–1992: Georgetown (KY) (assistant)
- 1993–1996: Madison Central HS (KY)
- 1997–2021: Georgetown (KY)

Head coaching record
- Overall: 218–65 (college)
- Tournaments: 23–14 (NAIA playoffs)

Accomplishments and honors

Championships
- 2 NAIA (2000–2001); 8 MSC (1997–2004); 7 MSC East Division (2005–2006, 2010–2012, 2015–2016)

Awards
- 2× NAIA Coach of the Year (2000–2001)

Bill Cronin is an American former football coach. He is served as the head football coach at Georgetown College in Georgetown, Kentucky from 1997 to 2021, compiling a record of 218–65. Cronin led the Georgetown Tigers to consecutive NAIA Football National Championships in 2000 and 2001.

Cronin was an assistant football coach at Georgetown for 11 seasons, from 1982 to 1992, under Kevin Donley. He then served as the head football coach at Madison Central High School in Richmond, Kentucky from 1993 to 1996.

Cronin retired after the 2021 was season and was succeeded by Chris Oliver.

== Head coaching record ==
=== College ===
| Year | Team | Overall | Conference | Standing | Bowl/playoffs | NAIA^{#} |
|---|---|---|---|---|---|---|
Georgetown Tigers (Mid-South Conference) (1997–2021)
| 1997 | Georgetown | 5–4 | 5–1 | T–1st | | 9 |
| 1998 | Georgetown | 9–3 | 6–1 | T–1st | L NAIA Quarterfinal | |
| 1999 | Georgetown | 13–1 | 7–0 | 1st | L NAIA Championship | 1 |
| 2000 | Georgetown | 14–0 | 8–0 | 1st | W NAIA Championship | 1 |
| 2001 | Georgetown | 14–0 | 7–0 | 1st | W NAIA Championship | 1 |
| 2002 | Georgetown | 12–2 | 8–0 | 1st | L NAIA Championship | 2 |
| 2003 | Georgetown | 9–3 | 8–1 | T–1st | L NAIA First Round | 11 |
| 2004 | Georgetown | 12–1 | 10–0 | 1st | L NAIA Semifinal | 3 |
| 2005 | Georgetown | 9–3 | 8–0 | 1st (East) | L NAIA Quarterfinal | 5 |
| 2006 | Georgetown | 10–1 | 5–0 | 1st (East) | L NAIA First Round | 10 |
| 2007 | Georgetown | 6–4 | 3–2 | 3rd (East) | | 24 |
| 2008 | Georgetown | 5–5 | 3–3 | 4th (East) | | |
| 2009 | Georgetown | 7–4 | 4–2 | T–2nd (East) | | |
| 2010 | Georgetown | 8–3 | 6–0 | 1st (East) | L NAIA Semifinal | 14 |
| 2011 | Georgetown | 12–1 | 5–0 | 1st (East) | L NAIA Semifinal | 4 |
| 2012 | Georgetown | 10–1 | 5–0 | 1st (East) | L NAIA First Round | 8 |
| 2013 | Georgetown | 7–4 | 5–1 | 2nd (East) | L NAIA First Round | 12 |
| 2014 | Georgetown | 8–3 | 5–1 | 2nd (East) | L NAIA First Round | 11 |
| 2015 | Georgetown | 6–4 | 5–0 | 1st (East) | | 25 |
| 2016 | Georgetown | 7–4 | 5–1 | T–1st (East) | | 25 |
| 2017 | Georgetown | 9–2 | 5–1 | 2nd (Bluegrass) | L NAIA Quarterfinal | 7 |
| 2018 | Georgetown | 7–3 | 4–2 | T–2nd (Bluegrass) | | 19 |
| 2019 | Georgetown | 5–5 | 4–3 | T–3rd (Bluegrass) | | |
| 2020–21 | Georgetown | 6–2 | 6–1 | 2nd (Bluegrass) | L NAIA First Round | 13 |
| 2021 | Georgetown | 8–2 | 5–2 | 2nd (Bluegrass) | | 15 |
| Georgetown: | | 218–65 | 144–22 | | | |
| Total: | | 218–65 | | | | |
National championship Conference title Conference division title or championship game berth
^{#}Rankings from final NAIA Coaches' Poll.

== See also ==
- List of college football career coaching wins leaders
