= 2001 Valley City State Vikings football team =

American college football season

2001 Valley City State Vikings football
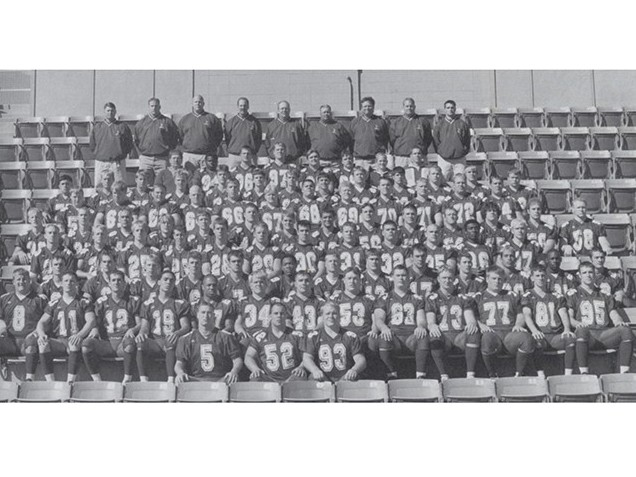

NAIA First Round, L 27–45 at Carroll (MT)
- Conference: Dakota Athletic Conference
- Record: 9–2 (8–1 DAC)
- Head coach: Dennis McCulloch (5th season)
- Offensive coordinator: Cory Anderson
- Defensive coordinator: Gregg Horner (5th season)
- MVP: Jeremy Peschel
- Home stadium: Lokken Stadium

2001 Dakota Athletic Conference football standings
	Conf.			Overall
Team	W		L	W		L
No. 8 Mary $^	9	–	0	9	–	1
No. 13 Valley City State	8	–	1	9	–	2
No. 21 Huron	7	–	2	7	–	3
Dickinson State	6	–	3	6	–	4
Jamestown	5	–	4	5	–	5
Minot State	4	–	5	4	–	6
Black Hills State	2	–	7	3	–	7
Dakota State	2	–	7	2	–	8
South Dakota Mines	2	–	7	2	–	8
Mayville State	0	–	9	0	–	10
$ – Conference champion; ^ – NAIA playoff participant; Rankings from NAIA Coaches' Poll

The 2001 Valley City State Vikings football team represented Valley City State University in the 2001 NAIA football season as a member of the Dakota Athletic Conference (DAC). Under fifth-year head coach Dennis McCulloch, the Vikings finished 9–2 overall and 8–1 in conference play, earning a second consecutive berth in the NAIA playoffs for the first time in program history. Valley City State opened the season 9–0 before falling to conference champion Mary in the regular-season finale and losing at Carroll (MT) in the NAIA First Round.

Wide receiver Steve Battle and linebacker Ben Aarestad were both named NAIA Second-Team All-Americans, while quarterback Jeremy Peschel earned conference Most Valuable Player honors for the second straight season. Eight Vikings were selected to the All-DAC First Team: Peschel, Battle, Aarestad, Justin Wieseler, Brent Miller, James Thornton, Mike Silbernagel, and David Rowe.

Valley City State dominated early in the season, posting back-to-back shutouts over Minnesota–Morris and Minot State and outscoring their first nine opponents by a wide margin. The Vikings’ 9–0 start positioned them among the top teams in the NAIA, rising as high as No. 3 in the NAIA Coaches' Poll.

A road loss at Mary in the regular-season finale left the Vikings as runners-up in the DAC standings, but they still secured an at-large bid to the NAIA playoffs for a second consecutive year. In the first round, Valley City State traveled to Helena, Montana, where they fell 45–27 to eventual national champion Carroll (MT).

== Schedule ==
Date	Opponent	Rank	Site	Result
September 1	Minnesota–Morris*	No. 8	Lokken Stadium; Valley City, ND	W 45–0
September 8	Minot State	No. 8	Lokken Stadium; Valley City, ND	W 42–0
September 15	at Dakota State	No. 7	Madison, SD	W 33–0
September 22	at Black Hills State	No. 4	Spearfish, SD	W 21–7
September 29	Jamestown	No. 4	Lokken Stadium; Valley City, ND (rivalry)	W 33–14
October 6	No. 22 Huron	No. 4	Lokken Stadium; Valley City, ND	W 31–0
October 13	at Dickinson State	No. 3	Biesiot Activities Center; Dickinson, ND (rivalry)	W 23–20
October 20	at Mayville State	No. 3	Jerome Berg Field; Mayville, ND (rivalry)	W 35–14
October 27	South Dakota Mines	No. 3	Lokken Stadium; Valley City, ND	W 51–13
November 3	at No. 4 Mary	No. 3	Bismarck, ND	L 8–40
November 17	at No. 4 Carroll (MT)*	No. 12	Helena, MT (NAIA First Round)	L 27–45
*Non-conference game; Rankings from NAIA Poll released prior to the game

== Rankings ==
Ranking movements Legend: ██ Increase in ranking ██ Decrease in ranking
	Week										
Poll	Pre	1	2	3	4	5	6	7	8	9	Final
NAIA Coaches' Poll	8	7	4	4	3	3	3	3	12	12	13

== Coaching staff ==
- Dennis McCulloch: head coach
- Cory Anderson: offensive coordinator
- Gregg Horner: defensive coordinator
- Nat Hill: assistant coach
- Dave Rausch: assistant coach
- Jamie Nelson: assistant coach

== Awards and honors ==
- Jeremy Peschel – Dakota Athletic Conference Most Valuable Player (Second Consecutive Season)
- Steve Battle – NAIA Second-Team All-American (Wide receiver)
- Ben Aarestad – NAIA Second-Team All-American (Linebacker)
- Brent Miller - NAIA Second-Team All-American (Defensive Line)

Dakota Athletic Conference All-Conference

- Jeremy Peschel
- Steve Battle
- Justin Wieseler
- Brent Miller
- Mike Silbernagel
- Ben Aarestad
- David Rowe
- James Thornton
- J.O. Thielges
- Josh Komarek
- Mike Rowe
