= 2005 Valley City State Vikings football team =

American college football season

2005 Valley City State Vikings football
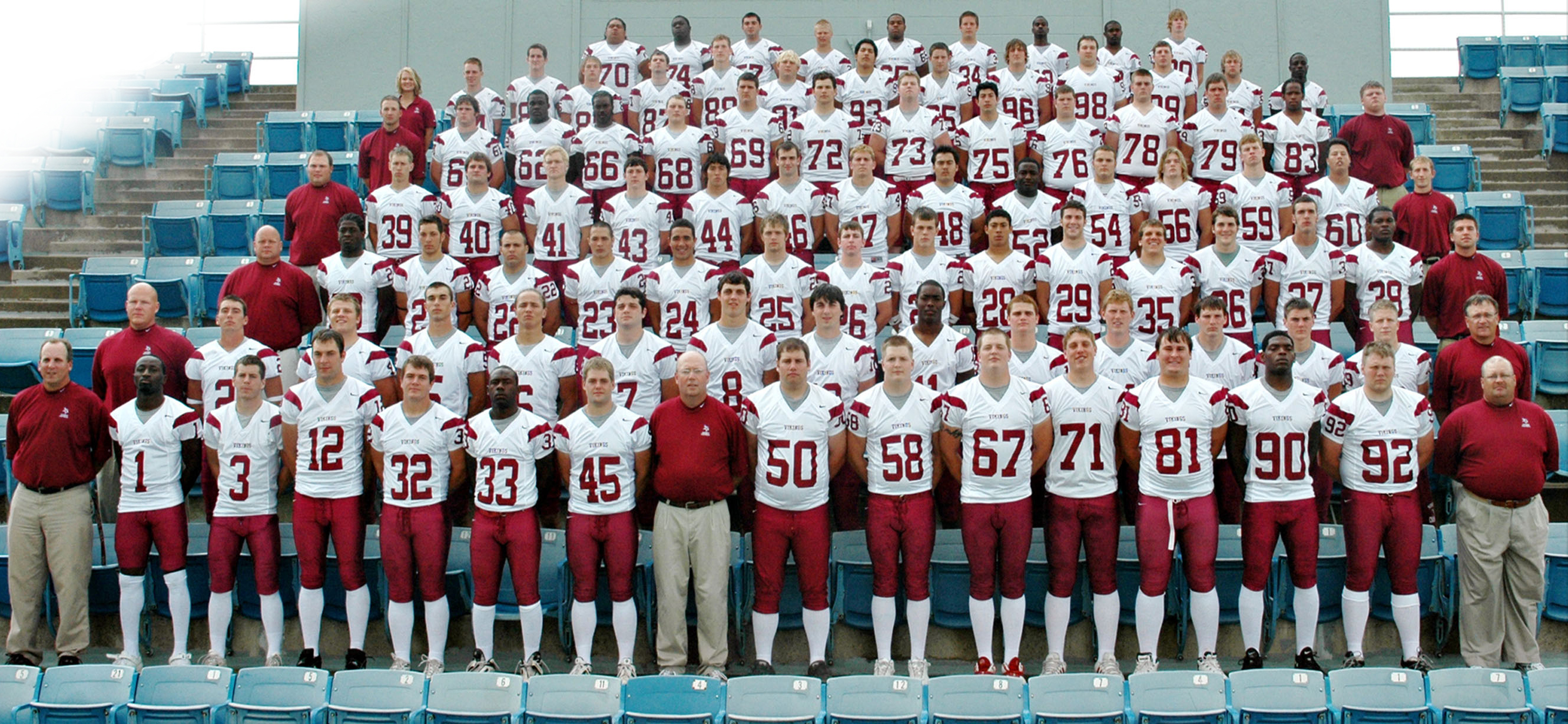

DAC co-champion
- Conference: Dakota Athletic Conference
- Record: 7–3 (6–1 DAC)
- Head coach: Dennis McCulloch (9th season)
- Offensive coordinator: Cory Anderson
- Defensive coordinator: Gregg Horner (9th season)
- Home stadium: Lokken Stadium

2005 Dakota Athletic Conference football standings
| | Conf. | | | Overall |
| Team | W | | L | W | | L |
|---|---|---|---|---|---|---|
| No. 22 Valley City State + | 6 | – | 1 | 7 | – | 3 |
| No. 11 Dickinson State +^ | 6 | – | 1 | 7 | – | 4 |
| No. 24 Black Hills State | 5 | – | 2 | 7 | – | 3 |
| Dakota State | 3 | – | 4 | 4 | – | 6 |
| Minot State | 3 | – | 4 | 4 | – | 6 |
| Jamestown | 3 | – | 4 | 3 | – | 7 |
| Mayville State | 1 | – | 6 | 2 | – | 8 |
| South Dakota Mines | 1 | – | 6 | 1 | – | 9 |
+ – Conference co-champions; ^ – NAIA playoff participant; Rankings from NAIA Coaches' Poll

The 2005 Valley City State Vikings football team represented Valley City State University in the 2005 NAIA football season as a member of the Dakota Athletic Conference (DAC). Under ninth-year head coach Dennis McCulloch, the Vikings finished the season 7–3 overall and 6–1 in conference play, earning a share of the DAC championship. NAIA Scholar-Athlete honorees were Jeremy Payne, Eric Spooner, and Michael Wagner.

== Schedule ==
| Date | Opponent | Site | Result |
|---|---|---|---|
| September 3 | Gustavus Adolphus* | Lokken Stadium; Valley City, ND | W 10–3 |
| September 10 | at Black Hills State | Spearfish, SD | W 19–14 |
| September 17 | Jamestown | Lokken Stadium; Valley City, ND (rivalry) | W 20–19 |
| October 1 | at Dickinson State | Dickinson, ND (rivalry) | L 6–13 |
| October 8 | at Mayville State | Mayville, ND (rivalry) | W 49–0 |
| October 15 | South Dakota Mines | Lokken Stadium; Valley City, ND | W 44–0 |
| October 22 | at Mary* | Bismarck, ND | L 13–17 |
| October 29 | Minot State | Lokken Stadium; Valley City, ND | W 30–21 |
| November 5 | at Dakota State | Madison, SD | W 29–21 |
| November 10 | Azusa Pacific* | Fargodome; Fargo, ND | L 31–34 |
*Non-conference game

== Rankings ==
Ranking movements Legend: ██ Increase in ranking ██ Decrease in ranking
| | Week | | | | | | | | | | |
| Poll | 1 | 2 | 3 | 4 | 5 | 6 | 7 | 8 | 9 | 10 | Final |
|---|---|---|---|---|---|---|---|---|---|---|---|
| NAIA Coaches' Poll | 25 | 19 | 17 | 21 | 18 | 15 | 21 | 19 | 18 | 22 | 22 |
