= 2001 NAIA football rankings =

Legend
	Increase in ranking
	Decrease in ranking
	Not ranked previous week
*	NAIA National Champion
т	Tied with team above or below also with this symbol

One human poll made up the 2001 National Association of Intercollegiate Athletics (NAIA) football rankings, sometimes called the NAIA Coaches' Poll or the football ratings. Once the regular season was complete, the NAIA sponsored a playoff to determine the year's national champion. A final poll was then taken after completion of the 2001 NAIA Football National Championship.

== Poll release dates ==
The poll release dates were:

- August 21, 2001 (Preseason)
- September 11, 2001 (Week 1)
- September 25, 2001 (Week 3)
- October 2, 2001 (Week 4)
- October 9, 2001 (Week 5)
- October 16, 2001 (Week 6)
- October 23, 2001 (Week 7)
- October 30, 2001 (Week 8)
- November 6, 2001 (Week 9)
- November 11, 2001 (Final)
- January 6, 2002 (Postseason)

== Week by week poll ==
	Week 0-Preseason Aug 21	Week Poll 1 Sep 11	Week Poll 2 Sep 25	Week Poll 3 Oct 2	Week Poll 4 Oct 9	Week Poll 5 Oct 16	Week Poll 6 Oct 23	Week Poll 7 Oct 30	Week Poll 8 Nov 6	Week Final Nov 11	Week Postseason Jan 6	
1.	Georgetown (KY)	Georgetown (KY)	Georgetown (KY)	Georgetown (KY)	Georgetown (KY)	Georgetown (KY)	Georgetown (KY)	Georgetown (KY)	Georgetown (KY)	Georgetown (KY)	*Georgetown (KY)	1.
2.	Northwestern Oklahoma State	Northwestern Oklahoma State	Saint Francis (IN)	Saint Francis (IN)	Saint Francis (IN)	Saint Francis (IN)	Saint Francis (IN)	Saint Francis (IN)	Mary (ND)	Mary (ND)	Sioux Falls (SD)	2.
3.	(T) Carroll (MT)	Carroll (MT)	Benedictine (KS)	Benedictine (KS)	Valley City State (ND)	Valley City State (ND)	Valley City State (ND)	Valley City State (ND)	Evangel (MO)	Evangel (MO)	Carroll (MT)	3.
4.	(T) Northwestern (IA)	Northwestern (IA)	Valley City State (ND)	Valley City State (ND)	Southern Oregon	Southern Oregon	Mary (ND)	Mary (ND)	Carroll (MT)	Carroll (MT)	Benedictine (KS)	4.
5.	Saint Francis (IN)	Saint Francis (IN)	Southern Oregon	Southern Oregon	Mary (ND)	Mary (ND)	MidAmerica Nazarene (KS)	Evangel (MO)	Sioux Falls (SD)	Sioux Falls (SD)	Southern Oregon	5.
6.	Benedictine (KS)	Benedictine (KS)	Mary (ND)	Mary (ND)	Doane (NE)	Doane (NE)	Evangel (MO)	Concordia (NE)	Benedictine (KS)	Benedictine (KS)	Evangel (MO)	6.
7.	St. Ambrose (IA)	Valley City State (ND)	Campbellsville (KY)	Doane (NE)	MidAmerica Nazarene (KS)	MidAmerica Nazarene (KS)	Sioux Falls (SD)	Sioux Falls (SD)	Southern Oregon	Southern Oregon	Concordia (NE)	7.
8.	Valley City State (ND)	Sioux Falls (SD)	Doane (NE)	MidAmerica Nazarene (KS)	Evangel (MO)	Evangel (MO)	Carroll (MT)	Carroll (MT)	McKendree (IL)	Concordia (NE)	Mary (ND)	8.
9.	Lambuth (TN)	Southern Oregon	Sioux Falls (SD)	Sioux Falls (SD)	Sioux Falls (SD)	Sioux Falls (SD)	Concordia (NE)	Benedictine (KS)	Saint Francis (IN)	Saint Francis (IN)	Northwestern Oklahoma State	9.
10.	Huron (SD)	Walsh (OH)	MidAmerica Nazarene (KS)	Carroll (MT)	Carroll (MT)	Carroll (MT)	Southern Oregon	Southern Oregon	Concordia (NE)	Tri-State (IN)	Campbellsville (KY)	10.
11.	Ottawa (KS)	Mary (ND)	Carroll (MT)	Evangel (MO)	Concordia (NE)	Concordia (NE)	McKendree (IL)	McKendree (IL)	Northwestern Oklahoma State	Northwestern Oklahoma State	Tri-State (IN)	11.
12.	Olivet Nazarene (IL)	Lambuth (TN)	Evangel (MO)	Concordia (NE)	McKendree (IL)	McKendree (IL)	Benedictine (KS)	MidAmerica Nazarene (KS)	Valley City State (ND)	Valley City State (ND)	St. Ambrose (IA)	12.
13.	Baker (KS)	Nebraska Wesleyan	Northwestern (IA)	Nebraska Wesleyan	Benedictine (KS)	Benedictine (KS)	Campbellsville (KY)	Northwestern Oklahoma State	Walsh (OH)	St. Ambrose (IA)	Valley City State (ND)	13.
14.	(T) Sioux Falls (SD)	St. Ambrose (IA)	Nebraska Wesleyan	McKendree (IL)	Campbellsville (KY)	Campbellsville (KY)	Doane (NE)	Montana Tech	Tri-State (IN)	Kansas Wesleyan	Saint Francis (IN)	14.
15.	(T) Southern Oregon	Campbellsville (KY)	Virginia-Wise	Campbellsville (KY)	Montana Tech	Montana Tech	Montana Tech	Walsh (OH)	Kansas Wesleyan	Campbellsville (KY)	McKendree (IL)	15.
16.	Montana Tech	MidAmerica Nazarene (KS)	Azusa Pacific (CA)	Northwestern Oklahoma State	Bethany (KS)	Bethany (KS)	Northwestern Oklahoma State	St. Ambrose (IA)	Hastings (NE)	McKendree (IL)	Montana Tech	16.
17.	MidAmerica Nazarene (KS)	McKendree (IL)	Northwestern Oklahoma State	Montana Tech	Northwestern Oklahoma State	Northwestern Oklahoma State	Bethany (KS)	Kansas Wesleyan	St. Ambrose (IA)	Montana Tech	Kansas Wesleyan	17.
18.	Mary (ND)	Huron (SD)	Concordia (NE)	Belhaven (MS)	Trinity International (IL)	Walsh (OH)	Walsh (OH)	Tri-State (IN)	Campbellsville (KY)	Hastings (NE)	Hastings (NE)	18.
19.	Peru State (NE)	Azusa Pacific (CA)	McKendree (IL)	Bethany (KS)	Walsh (OH)	Cumberland (TN)	St. Ambrose (IA)	Campbellsville (KY)	(T) Montana Tech	Bethany (KS)	Bethany (KS)	19.
20.	Nebraska Wesleyan	Evangel (MO)	Trinity International (IL)	Tri-State (IN)	Cumberland (TN)	St. Ambrose (IA)	Hastings (NE)	Hastings (NE)	(T) Bethany (KS)	Walsh (OH)	Walsh (OH)	20.
21.	Azusa Pacific (CA)	Doane (NE)	Montana Tech	Saint Xavier (IL)	St. Ambrose (IA)	Tri-State (IN)	Tri-State (IN)	(T) Doane (NE)	MidAmerica Nazarene (KS)	Huron (SD)	Huron (SD)	21.
22.	Campbellsville (KY)	Virginia-Wise	Belhaven (MS)	Huron (SD)	Nebraska Wesleyan	Hastings (NE)	Kansas Wesleyan	(T) Bethany (KS)	Huron (SD)	Northwestern (MN)	Doane (NE)	22.
23.	Walsh (OH)	Geneva (PA)	Huron (SD)	Trinity International (IL)	Baker (KS)	Kansas Wesleyan	Trinity International (IL)	Trinity International (IL)	Northwestern (IA)	Cumberland (TN)	Cumberland (TN)	23.
24.	McKendree (IL)	Ottawa (KS)	Bethany (KS)	Virginia-Wise	(T) Belhaven (MS)	Trinity International (IL)	Cumberland (TN)	Cumberland (TN)	Southwestern (KS)	Doane (NE)	Northwestern (MN)	24.
25.	Kansas Wesleyan	Montana Tech	Tri-State (IN)	Walsh (OH)	(T) Tri-State (IN)	Friends (KS)	Northwestern (MN)	Northwestern (MN)	Doane (NE)	Saint Xavier (IL)	Saint Xavier (IL)	25.
	Week 0-Preseason Aug 21	Week Poll 1 Sep 11	Week Poll 2 Sep 25	Week Poll 3 Oct 2	Week Poll 4 Oct 9	Week Poll 5 Oct 16	Week Poll 6 Oct 23	Week Poll 7 Oct 30	Week Poll 8 Nov 6	Week Final Nov 11	Week Postseason Jan 6	
		Dropped: Olivet Nazarene (IL); Baker (KS); Peru State (NE); Kansas Wesleyan	Dropped: Walsh (OH); Lambuth (TN); St. Ambrose (IA); Geneva (PA); Ottawa (KS)	Dropped: Northwestern (IA); Azusa Pacific (CA)	Dropped: Saint Xavier (IL); Huron (SD); Virginia-Wise	Dropped: Nebraska Wesleyan; Baker (KS); Belhaven (MS)	Dropped: Friends (KS)	Dropped: NONE	Dropped: Trinity International; Northwestern (MN); Cumberland (TN)	Dropped: MidAmerica Nazarene (KS); Northwestern (IA); Southwestern (KS)	Dropped: NONE	

== Leading vote-getters ==
Since the inception of the Coaches' Poll in 1999, the #1 ranking in the various weekly polls has been held by only a select group of teams. Through the postseason poll of the 2001 season, the teams and the number of times they have held the #1 weekly ranking are shown below. The number of times a team has been ranked #1 in the postseason poll (the national champion) is shown in parentheses.

In 1999, the results of a postseason poll, if one was conducted, are not known. Therefore, an additional poll has been presumed, and the #1 postseason ranking has been credited to the postseason tournament champion, the Northwestern Oklahoma State Rangers.

Team	Total #1 Rankings
Georgetown (KY)	21 (2)
Northwestern Oklahoma State	12 (1)
Azusa Pacific (CA)	3
