= 2000 NAIA football season =

American college football season

- National Championship: Jim Carroll Stadium; Savannah, TN; December 16, 2000
- Champion: Georgetown (KY)
- Player of the Year: Eddie Eviston (quarterback, Georgetown (KY))

The 2000 NAIA football season was the component of the 2000 college football season organized by the National Association of Intercollegiate Athletics (NAIA) in the United States. The season's playoffs, known as the NAIA Football National Championship, culminated with the championship game on December 16, at Jim Carroll Stadium in Savannah, Tennessee. The Georgetown Tigers defeated the Northwestern Oklahoma State Rangers, 20–0, in the title game to win the program's second NAIA championship.

== Conference and membership changes ==
=== Conference changes ===
- This was the first season for the Dakota Athletic Conference. The DAC was formed by former members of the newly-disbanded North Dakota College Athletic and South Dakota-Iowa Intercollegiate conferences from North Dakota and South Dakota.
- This was also the first season for the Great Plains Athletic Conference, which rebranded from the Nebraska-Iowa Athletic Conference after adding four former members of the South Dakota-Iowa Intercollegiate Conference from South Dakota and Iowa.

=== Membership changes ===
Team	1999 conference	2000 conference
Black Hills State	South Dakota-Iowa	Dakota
Dakota State	South Dakota-Iowa	Dakota
Dakota Wesleyan	South Dakota-Iowa	Great Plains
Dickinson State	North Dakota	Dakota
Dordt	South Dakota-Iowa	Great Plains
Jamestown	North Dakota	Dakota
Mary	North Dakota	Dakota
Mayville State	North Dakota	Dakota
Minot State	North Dakota	Dakota
Mount Marty	South Dakota-Iowa	Great Plains
Si Tanka	South Dakota-Iowa	Dakota
Sioux Falls	South Dakota-Iowa	Great Plains
South Dakota Mines	South Dakota-Iowa	Dakota
Valley City State	North Dakota	Dakota

== Conference standings ==
2000 Central States Football League standings
	Conf.			Overall
Team	W		L	W		L
No. 2 NW Oklahoma State $^	5	–	0	13	–	1
No. 20 Peru State	4	–	1	8	–	2
Langston	3	–	2	5	–	4
Lincoln (MO)	2	–	3	3	–	6
Haskell	1	–	4	2	–	8
SAGU	0	–	5	2	–	8
$ – Conference champion; ^ – NAIA playoff participant; Rankings from NAIA Coaches' Poll

2000 Dakota Athletic Conference football standings
	Conf.			Overall
Team	W		L	W		L
No. 10 Valley City State +^	8	–	1	9	–	2
No. 8 Huron +^	8	–	1	9	–	3
No. 12 Mary	7	–	2	7	–	2
Dickinson State	5	–	4	6	–	4
Minot State	5	–	4	5	–	5
Mayville State	4	–	5	4	–	6
Dakota State	3	–	6	3	–	7
Black Hills State	3	–	6	3	–	7
Jamestown	2	–	7	3	–	6
South Dakota Mines	0	–	9	0	–	10
+ – Conference co-champions; ^ – NAIA playoff participant; Rankings from NAIA Coaches' Poll

2000 Frontier Conference football standings
	Conf.			Overall
Team	W		L	W		L
No. 3 Carroll (MT) $^	6	–	2	10	–	4
No. 23 Montana Tech	6	–	2	7	–	4
Rocky Mountain	5	–	3	5	–	5
Montana State–Northern	2	–	6	2	–	8
Western Montana	1	–	7	1	–	9
$ – Conference champion; ^ – NAIA playoff participant; Rankings from NAIA Coaches' Poll

2000 Great Plains Athletic Conference football standings
	Conf.			Overall
Team	W		L	W		L
No. 13 Nebraska Wesleyan +^	6	–	2	8	–	3
No. 4 Northwestern (IA) +^	6	–	2	9	–	4
Hastings	5	–	3	6	–	3
Sioux Falls	5	–	3	6	–	4
Doane	5	–	3	5	–	4
Concordia (NE)	4	–	4	7	–	4
Midland Lutheran	4	–	4	5	–	5
Dakota Wesleyan	1	–	7	2	–	8
Dana	0	–	8	1	–	9
+ – Conference co-champions; ^ – NAIA playoff participant; Rankings from NAIA Coaches' Poll

2000 Heart of America Athletic Conference football standings
	Conf.			Overall
Team	W		L	W		L
No. 9 Benedictine (KS) $^	9	–	0	10	–	1
No. 5 MidAmerica Nazarene	8	–	1	11	–	2
No. 18 Baker	7	–	2	9	–	2
Evangel	5	–	4	5	–	4
Lindenwood	4	–	5	4	–	8
Missouri Valley	3	–	6	3	–	7
William Jewell	3	–	6	3	–	7
Culver–Stockton	3	–	6	3	–	8
Graceland	2	–	7	2	–	8
Central Methodist	1	–	8	3	–	8
$ – Conference champion; ^ – NAIA playoff participant; Rankings from NAIA Coaches' Poll

2000 Kansas Collegiate Athletic Conference football standings
	Conf.			Overall
Team	W		L	W		L
No. 14 Ottawa $^	9	–	0	9	–	2
No. 22 Bethel (KS)	7	–	2	8	–	2
Bethany (KS)	6	–	3	7	–	3
No. T–24 Kansas Wesleyan	6	–	3	7	–	4
Southwestern (KS)	6	–	3	6	–	4
Sterling	4	–	5	4	–	6
Friends	3	–	6	3	–	7
Tabor	3	–	6	3	–	7
McPherson	1	–	8	1	–	8
Saint Mary (KS)	0	–	9	0	–	9
$ – Conference champion; ^ – NAIA playoff participant; Rankings from NAIA Coaches' Poll

2000 Mid-South Conference football standings
	Conf.			Overall
Team	W		L	W		L
No. 1 Georgetown (KY) $^	8	–	0	14	–	0
No. 11 Lambuth ^	6	–	1	7	–	4
No. 17 Campbellsville	5	–	2	7	–	4
Belhaven	4	–	3	5	–	5
Cumberland (TN)	3	–	5	5	–	5
Union (KY)	2	–	5	3	–	7
Cumberland (KY)	1	–	6	2	–	8
North Greenville	0	–	8	0	–	10
$ – Conference champion; ^ – NAIA playoff participant; Rankings from NAIA Coaches' Poll

2000 Mid-States Football Association standings
	Conf.			Overall
Team	W		L	W		L
Mideast League
No. 6 Saint Francis (IN) x^	6	–	0	10	–	2
Walsh	4	–	2	6	–	5
No. 21 Geneva	3	–	3	7	–	3
Tri-State	3	–	3	6	–	5
Malone	2	–	4	4	–	7
Tiffin	2	–	4	3	–	7
Urbana	1	–	5	1	–	9
Midwest League
No. 7 St. Ambrose x^	7	–	0	9	–	3
No. 15 Olivet Nazarene ^	6	–	1	8	–	3
No. 19 McKendree	5	–	2	7	–	3
Saint Xavier	4	–	3	6	–	4
St. Francis (IL)	3	–	4	5	–	6
Taylor	2	–	5	3	–	7
Trinity International	1	–	6	4	–	7
Iowa Wesleyan	0	–	7	0	–	10
x – League champion/co-champions ^ – NAIA playoff participant; Rankings from NAIA Coaches' Poll

2000 NAIA independents football records
	Conf.			Overall
Team	W		L	W		L
No. 16 Azusa Pacific ^		–		6	–	4
Southern Oregon		–		5	–	4
Virginia–Wise		–		3	–	7
^ – NAIA playoff participant; Rankings from NAIA Coaches' Poll
