= 2000 Valley City State Vikings football team =

American college football season

2000 Valley City State Vikings football
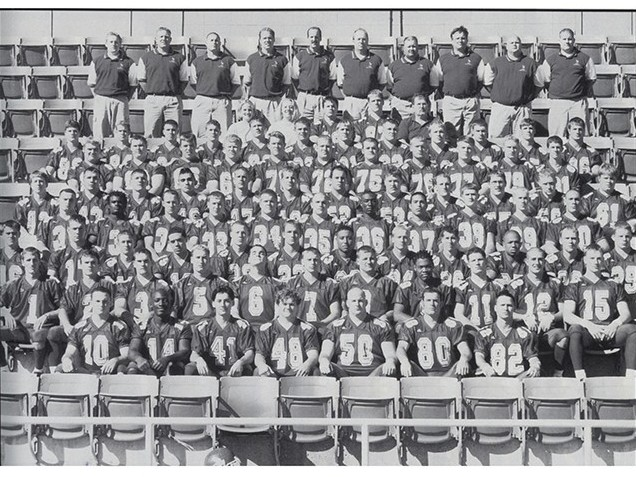

DAC co-champion

NAIA First Round, L 21–24 vs. Carroll (MT)
- Conference: Dakota Athletic Conference
- Record: 9–2 (8–1 DAC)
- Head coach: Dennis McCulloch (4th season)
- Offensive coordinator: Cory Anderson
- Defensive coordinator: Gregg Horner (4th season)
- MVP: Jeremy Peschel
- Home stadium: Lokken Stadium

2000 Dakota Athletic Conference football standings
	Conf.			Overall
Team	W		L	W		L
No. 10 Valley City State +^	8	–	1	9	–	2
No. 8 Huron +^	8	–	1	9	–	3
No. 12 Mary	7	–	2	7	–	2
Dickinson State	5	–	4	6	–	4
Minot State	5	–	4	5	–	5
Mayville State	4	–	5	4	–	6
Dakota State	3	–	6	3	–	7
Black Hills State	3	–	6	3	–	7
Jamestown	2	–	7	3	–	6
South Dakota Mines	0	–	9	0	–	10
+ – Conference co-champions; ^ – NAIA playoff participant; Rankings from NAIA Coaches' Poll

The 2000 Valley City State Vikings football team represented Valley City State University in the 2000 NAIA football season as a member of the Dakota Athletic Conference (DAC). Under fourth-year head coach Dennis McCulloch, the Vikings completed one of the most dramatic turnarounds in program history, rebounding from an 0–10 season two years prior to finish 9–2 overall and 8–1 in conference play. The Vikings tied Huron for the DAC championship, and advanced to the NAIA playoffs, hosting the Carroll Saints at the Fargodome in Fargo, North Dakota, where they narrowly lost, 24–21.

Quarterback Jeremy Peschel was named DAC Most Valuable Player, and wide receiver Steve Battle earned Second-Team NAIA All-American honors. Seven Vikings were named First-Team All-Conference: Peschel, Battle, Mark Rerick, Darin Walters, Ben Aarestad, Brent Miller, and James Thornton.

After an early loss to Minot State, the Vikings caught fire, reeling off eight consecutive victories to clinch a share of the Dakota Athletic Conference title. VCSU's high-powered offense averaged more than 33 points per game, led by quarterback Jeremy Peschel and wideout Steve Battle. The defense, anchored by linemen Brent Miller and James Thornton, limited opponents to 17.5 points per game.

The Vikings earned the right to host their first-ever playoff game in the Fargodome, where they fell to Carroll (MT), 24–21, in a back-and-forth contest decided in the final minutes.

== Schedule ==
Date	Opponent	Rank	Site	Result
September 2	Minnesota–Morris*	No. 24	Lokken Stadium; Valley City, ND	W 40–13
September 9	at Minot State	No. 24	Minot, ND	L 12–13
September 16	Dakota State		Lokken Stadium; Valley City, ND	W 34–10
September 23	Black Hills State		Lokken Stadium; Valley City, ND	W 28–7
September 30	at Jamestown	No. 24	Jamestown, ND (rivalry)	W 27–25
October 7	at No. 6 Huron	No. 22	Huron, SD	W 51–28
October 14	No. 24 Dickinson State	No. 10	Lokken Stadium; Valley City, ND (rivalry)	W 35–28
October 21	Mayville State	No. 8	Lokken Stadium; Valley City, ND (rivalry)	W 45–3
October 28	at South Dakota Mines	No. 8	Rapid City, SD	W 21–14
November 4	No. 3 Mary	No. 8	Lokken Stadium; Valley City, ND	W 35–21
November 18	No. 16 Carroll (MT)*	No. 6	Fargodome; Fargo, ND (NAIA First Round)	L 21–24
*Non-conference game; Rankings from NAIA Poll released prior to the game

== Rankings ==
Ranking movements Legend: ██ Increase in ranking ██ Decrease in ranking — = Not ranked
	Week											
Poll	Pre	1	2	3	4	5	6	7	8	9	10	Final
NAIA Coaches' Poll	24	—	—	24	22	10	8	8	8	6	6	10

== Coaching staff ==
- Dennis McCulloch: head coach
- Cory Anderson: assistant coach
- Gregg Horner: assistant coach
- Lenny Doerfler: assistant coach
- Dave Rausch: assistant coach

== Awards and honors ==
- Jeremy Peschel: Dakota Athletic Conference Most Valuable Player
- Steve Battle: NAIA Second-Team All-American
- Mark Rerick, Darin Walters, Ben Aarestad, Brent Miller, James Thornton: First-Team All-DAC
