= John Perin (American football) =

American football coach (born c. 1985)

Current position
- Title: Head coach
- Team: Georgetown (KY)
- Conference: MSC
- Record: 7–3

Biographical details
- Born: c. 1985 (age 40–41); Cincinnati, Ohio, U.S.
- Education: Centre College (2008)

Playing career
- 2003: Miami (OH)
- 2004–2007: Centre
- Position: Defensive back

Coaching career (HC unless noted)
- 2009: Muskingum (GA/CB)
- 2010–2012: Centre (DB/RC)
- 2013: Capital (DC/DB)
- 2014: Eastern Michigan (GA)
- 2015–2016: Morehead State (STC/DB)
- 2017: Birmingham–Southern (DC/LB)
- 2018–2021: Birmingham–Southern (DC/DB)
- 2022–2024: Georgetown (KY) (DC)
- 2025–present: Georgetown (KY)

Head coaching record
- Overall: 7–3

Accomplishments and honors

Awards
- Second-team All-SCAC (2007)

John Perin (born c. 1984) is an American college football coach. He is the head football coach for Georgetown College, a position he has held since 2025.

In 2022, Perin was hired as the defensive coordinator for Georgetown under Chris Oliver. Alongside Oliver, Perin helped lead the team to a 26–8 record and back-to-back Mid-South Conference (MSC) championships. After two seasons, Perin was promoted to head coach after Oliver resigned.

Perin became just the fourth head coach at Georgetown since 1982, following Kevin Donley, Bob Brush, Bill Cronin, and Oliver.

== Head coaching record ==
Year	Team	Overall	Conference	Standing	Bowl/playoffs	NAIA^{#}
Georgetown Tigers (Mid-South Conference) (2025–present)
2025	Georgetown	7–3	4–2	T–2nd		20
2026	Georgetown	0–0	0–0			
Georgetown:		7–3	4–2			
Total:		7–3				
