= 2000 Georgetown Tigers football team =

American college football season

2000 Georgetown Tigers football

NAIA national champion MSC champion

NAIA National Championship Game, W 20–0 vs. Northwestern Oklahoma State
- Conference: Mid-South Conference
- Record: 14–0 (8–0 MSC)
- Head coach: Bill Cronin (5th season)

2000 Mid-South Conference football standings
	Conf.			Overall
Team	W		L	W		L
No. 1 Georgetown (KY) $^	8	–	0	14	–	0
No. 11 Lambuth ^	6	–	1	7	–	4
No. 17 Campbellsville	5	–	2	7	–	4
Belhaven	4	–	3	5	–	5
Cumberland (TN)	3	–	5	5	–	5
Union (KY)	2	–	5	3	–	7
Cumberland (KY)	1	–	6	2	–	8
North Greenville	0	–	8	0	–	10
$ – Conference champion; ^ – NAIA playoff participant; Rankings from NAIA Coaches' Poll

The 2000 Georgetown Tigers football team was an American football team that represented Georgetown College of Georgetown, Kentucky, as a member of the Mid-South Conference (MSC) during the 2000 NAIA football season. In their fifth season under head coach Bill Cronin, the Tigers compiled a 14–0 record (8–0 against conference opponents) and won the NAIA national championship, defeating Northwestern Oklahoma State, 20–0, in the NAIA National Championship Game.

== Schedule ==
Date	Opponent	Site	Result	Attendance	Source
September 2	at St. Francis (IL)*	Joliet, IL	W 28–7	2,000	
September 16	at Virginia–Wise*	Wise, VA	W 45–17	1,500	
September 23	at Union (KY)	Barbourville, KY	W 56–12	500	
September 30	North Greenville*	Georgetown, KY	W 56–0	2,800	
October 7	at Cumberland (KY)	Williamsburg, KY	W 71–9	1,000	
October 14	Lambuth	Georgetown, KY	W 37–28	3,630	
October 21	at Belhaven	Jackson, MS	W 63–20	1,000	
October 28	Campbellsville	Georgetown, KY	W 38–28	3,550	
November 4	at Cumberland (TN)	Lebanon, TN	W 38–13	250	
November 11	St. Joseph's (IN)*	Georgetown, KY	W 55–15	2,150	
November 18	Olivet Nazarene*	Georgetown, KY (NAIA first round)	W 55–6	750	
November 25	Saint Francis (IN)*	Georgetown, KY (NAIA quarterfinal)	W 37–19	900	
December 2	Carroll*	Georgetown, KY (NAIA semifinal)	W 28–21	835	
December 16	vs. Northwestern Oklahoma State	Jim Carroll Stadium; Savannah, TN (NAIA Championship Game)	W 20–0	6,650	
*Non-conference game
