= 2000 NAIA football rankings =

Legend
	Increase in ranking
	Decrease in ranking
	Not ranked previous week
*	NAIA National Champion
т	Tied with team above or below also with this symbol

One human poll made up the 2000 National Association of Intercollegiate Athletics (NAIA) football rankings, sometimes called the NAIA Coaches' Poll or the football ratings. Once the regular season was complete, the NAIA sponsored a playoff to determine the year's national champion. A final poll was then taken after completion of the 2000 NAIA Football National Championship.

== Poll release dates ==
The poll release dates were:

- (Preseason)
- September 12, 2000 (Week 1)
- September 19, 2000 (Week 2)
- September 26, 2000 (Week 3)
- October 3, 2000 (Week 4)
- October 10, 2000 (Week 5)
- October 17, 2000 (Week 6)
- October 24, 2000 (Week 7)
- October 31, 2000 (Week 8)
- November 7, 2000 (Week 9)
- November 12, 2000 (Final)
- December 20, 2000 (Postseason)

== Week by week poll ==
	Week 0-Preseason	Week Poll 1 Sep 12	Week Poll 2 Sep 19	Week Poll 3 Sep 26	Week Poll 4 Oct 3	Week Poll 5 Oct 10	Week Poll 6 Oct 17	Week Poll 7 Oct 24	Week Poll 8 Oct 31	Week Poll 9 Nov 7	Week Final Nov 12	Week Postseason Dec 20	
1.	Northwestern Oklahoma State	Northwestern Oklahoma State	Northwestern Oklahoma State	Northwestern Oklahoma State	Northwestern Oklahoma State	Northwestern Oklahoma State	Northwestern Oklahoma State	Northwestern Oklahoma State	Northwestern Oklahoma State	Northwestern Oklahoma State	Northwestern Oklahoma State	*Georgetown (KY)	1.
2.	Georgetown (KY)	Georgetown (KY)	Georgetown (KY)	Georgetown (KY)	Georgetown (KY)	Georgetown (KY)	Georgetown (KY)	Georgetown (KY)	Georgetown (KY)	Georgetown (KY)	Georgetown (KY)	Northwestern Oklahoma State	2.
3.	Mary (ND)	Mary (ND)	Saint Francis (IN)	Geneva (PA)	McKendree (IL)	Mary (ND)	Mary (ND)	Mary (ND)	Mary (ND)	(T) Saint Francis (IN)	Benedictine (KS)	Carroll (MT)	3.
4.	Hastings (NE)	Saint Francis (IN)	Dickinson State (ND)	Dickinson State (ND)	Mary (ND)	McKendree (IL)	McKendree (IL)	McKendree (IL)	McKendree (IL)	(T) Benedictine (KS)	MidAmerica Nazarene (KS)	Northwestern (IA)	4.
5.	Azusa Pacific (CA)	Southern Oregon	Geneva (PA)	McKendree (IL)	Saint Francis (IN)	(T) Saint Francis (IN)	Saint Francis (IN)	Saint Francis (IN)	Saint Francis (IN)	MidAmerica Nazarene (KS)	Northwestern (IA)	MidAmerica Nazarene (KS)	5.
6.	McKendree (IL)	Taylor (IN)	Azusa Pacific (CA)	MidAmerica Nazarene (KS)	Huron (SD)	(T) MidAmerica Nazarene (KS)	Benedictine (KS)	Benedictine (KS)	Benedictine (KS)	Valley City State (ND)	Valley City State (ND)	Saint Francis (IN)	6.
7.	Missouri Valley (MO)	Sioux Falls (SD)	Montana Tech	Mary (ND)	MidAmerica Nazarene (KS)	Benedictine (KS)	Peru State (NE)	Peru State (NE)	MidAmerica Nazarene (KS)	Huron (SD)	Saint Francis (IN)	St. Ambrose (IA)	7.
8.	Taylor (IN)	Dickinson State (ND)	Mary (ND)	Huron (SD)	Benedictine (KS)	Peru State (NE)	Valley City State (ND)	Valley City State (ND)	Valley City State (ND)	St. Ambrose (IA)	Huron (SD)	Huron (SD)	8.
9.	Saint Francis (IN)	Geneva (PA)	McKendree (IL)	Saint Francis (IN)	Geneva (PA)	Lambuth (TN)	MidAmerica Nazarene (KS)	MidAmerica Nazarene (KS)	Huron (SD)	Ottawa (KS)	Ottawa (KS)	Benedictine (KS)	9.
10.	Lambuth (TN)	Lambuth (TN)	MidAmerica Nazarene (KS)	Evangel (MO)	Southern Oregon	Valley City State (ND)	Huron (SD)	Huron (SD)	Ottawa (KS)	Mary (ND)	Lambuth (TN)	Valley City State (ND)	10.
11.	Montana Tech	Hastings (NE)	Huron (SD)	Southern Oregon	Doane (NE)	Azusa Pacific (CA)	Azusa Pacific (CA)	Azusa Pacific (CA)	St. Ambrose (IA)	Lambuth (TN)	St. Ambrose (IA)	Lambuth (TN)	11.
12.	Southern Oregon	Virginia-Wise	Evangel (MO)	Benedictine (KS)	Dickinson State (ND)	Geneva (PA)	Rocky Mountain (MT)	Ottawa (KS)	Lambuth (TN)	McKendree (IL)	Mary (ND)	Mary (ND)	12.
13.	Southwestern (KS)	Azusa Pacific (CA)	Concordia (NE)	Montana Tech	Peru State (NE)	Bethany (KS)	Ottawa (KS)	Nebraska Wesleyan	Montana Tech	Montana Tech	Olivet Nazarene (IL)	Nebraska Wesleyan	13.
14.	Dickinson State (ND)	McKendree (IL)	Southern Oregon	Doane (NE)	Lambuth (TN)	Huron (SD)	Nebraska Wesleyan	Lambuth (TN)	Northwestern (IA)	Northwestern (IA)	Nebraska Wesleyan	Ottawa (KS)	14.
15.	Evangel (MO)	Montana Tech	Taylor (IN)	Peru State (NE)	Concordia (NE)	Sioux Falls (SD)	Lambuth (TN)	Baker (KS)	Southern Oregon	Peru State (NE)	Campbellsville (KY)	Olivet Nazarene (IL)	15.
16.	Doane (NE)	Evangel (MO)	Bethany (KS)	Lambuth (TN)	Cumberland (TN)	Rocky Mountain (MT)	Doane (NE)	St. Ambrose (IA)	Peru State (NE)	Olivet Nazarene (IL)	Carroll (MT)	Azusa Pacific (CA)	16.
17.	Huron (SD)	Huron (SD)	Rocky Mountain (MT)	Concordia (NE)	Evangel (MO)	Southern Oregon	Baker (KS)	Southern Oregon	Baker (KS)	Geneva (PA)	Baker (KS)	Campbellsville (KY)	17.
18.	Virginia-Wise	MidAmerica Nazarene (KS)	Sioux Falls (SD)	Cumberland (TN)	Azusa Pacific (CA)	Ottawa (KS)	Concordia (NE)	Campbellsville (KY)	Sioux Falls (SD)	Campbellsville (KY)	McKendree (IL)	Baker (KS)	18.
19.	Sioux Falls (SD)	Rocky Mountain (MT)	Benedictine (KS)	Bethany (KS)	Bethany (KS)	Doane (NE)	Southern Oregon	Southwestern (KS)	Tri-State (IN)	Bethany (KS)	Azusa Pacific (CA)	McKendree (IL)	19.
20.	Geneva (PA)	Bethany (KS)	Doane (NE)	Azusa Pacific (CA)	Rocky Mountain (MT)	Saint Xavier (IL)	St. Ambrose (IA)	Montana Tech	Geneva (PA)	Azusa Pacific (CA)	Bethel (KS)	Peru State (NE)	20.
21.	Tri-State (IN)	Missouri Valley (MO)	Lambuth (TN)	Rocky Mountain (MT)	Sioux Falls (SD)	Concordia (NE)	Southwestern (KS)	Geneva (PA)	Campbellsville (KY)	Nebraska Wesleyan	Peru State (NE)	Geneva (PA)	21.
22.	Bethany (KS)	Doane (NE)	Virginia-Wise	Campbellsville (KY)	Valley City State (ND)	(T) Mount Senario (WI)	Montana Tech	(T) Rocky Mountain (MT)	Azusa Pacific (CA)	Mount Senario (WI)	Geneva (PA)	Bethel (KS)	22.
23.	Rocky Mountain (MT)	Benedictine (KS)	Baker (KS)	Sioux Falls (SD)	Ottawa (KS)	(T) Nebraska Wesleyan	Campbellsville (KY)	(T) Northwestern (IA)	Bethany (KS)	Baker (KS)	Montana Tech	Montana Tech	23.
24.	Valley City State (ND)	Southwestern (KS)	Southwestern (KS)	Valley City State (ND)	Mount Senario (WI)	Dickinson State (ND)	Geneva (PA)	Tri-State (IN)	Olivet Nazarene (IL)	Carroll (MT)	(T) Kansas Wesleyan	(T) Kansas Wesleyan	24.
25.	Carroll (MT)	Concordia (NE)	Peru State (NE)	Bethel (KS)	Montana Tech	Baker (KS)	Bethany (KS)	Bethany (KS)	Mount Senario (WI)	Bethel (KS)	(T) Sioux Falls (SD)	(T) Sioux Falls (SD)	25.
	Week 0-Preseason	Week Poll 1 Sep 12	Week Poll 2 Sep 19	Week Poll 3 Sep 26	Week Poll 4 Oct 3	Week Poll 5 Oct 10	Week Poll 6 Oct 17	Week Poll 7 Oct 24	Week Poll 8 Oct 31	Week Poll 9 Nov 7	Week Final Nov 12	Week Postseason Dec 20	
		Dropped: Tri-State (IN); Valley City State (ND); Carroll (MT)	Dropped: Hastings (NE); Missouri Valley (MO)	Dropped: Taylor (IN); Virginia-Wise; Baker (KS); Southwestern (KS)	Dropped: Campbellsville (KY); Bethel (KS)	Dropped: Cumberland (TN); Evangel (MO); Montana Tech	Dropped: Sioux Falls (SD); Saint Xavier (IL); Mount Senario (WI); Dickinson State (ND)	Dropped: Doane (NE); Concordia (NE)	Dropped: Nebraska Wesleyan; Southwestern (KS); Rocky Mountain (MT)	Dropped: Southern Oregon; Sioux Falls (SD); Tri-State (IN)	Dropped: Bethany (KS); Mount Senario (WI)	Dropped: NONE	

== Leading vote-getters ==
Since the inception of the Coaches' Poll in 1999, the #1 ranking in the various weekly polls has been held by only a select group of teams. Through the postseason poll of the 2000 season, the teams and the number of times they have held the #1 weekly ranking are shown below. The number of times a team has been ranked #1 in the postseason poll (the national champion) is shown in parentheses.

There has been only one tie for the leading vote-getter in a weekly poll. In 2015, Southern Oregon was tied with Marian (IN) in the preseason poll.

In 1999, the results of a postseason poll, if one was conducted, are not known. Therefore, an additional poll has been presumed, and the #1 postseason ranking has been credited to the postseason tournament champion, the Northwestern Oklahoma State Rangers.

Team	Total #1 Rankings
Northwestern Oklahoma State	12 (1)
Georgetown (KY)	10 (1)
Azusa Pacific (CA)	3
