= 2001 Georgetown Tigers football team =

American college football season

2001 Georgetown Tigers football

NAIA national champion MSC champion

NAIA National Championship Game, W 49–27 vs. Sioux Falls
- Conference: Mid-South Conference
- Record: 14–0 (7–0 MSC)
- Head coach: Bill Cronin (6th season)

2001 Mid-South Conference football standings
	Conf.			Overall
Team	W		L	W		L
No. 1 Georgetown (KY) $^	7	–	0	14	–	0
No. 10 Campbellsville ^	5	–	2	10	–	3
No. 23 Cumberland (TN)	4	–	2	6	–	3
Belhaven	3	–	4	4	–	6
Lambuth	3	–	4	3	–	6
Union (KY)	2	–	4	2	–	7
Pikeville	2	–	5	3	–	7
Cumberland (KY)	1	–	6	3	–	6
$ – Conference champion; ^ – NAIA playoff participant; Rankings from NAIA Coaches' Poll

The 2001 Georgetown Tigers football team was an American football team that represented Georgetown College of Georgetown, Kentucky, as a member of the Mid-South Conference (MSC) during the 2001 NAIA football season. In their sixth season under head coach Bill Cronin, the Tigers compiled a perfect 14–0 record (7–0 against conference opponents) and won the NAIA national championship, defeating Sioux Falls, 49–27, in the NAIA National Championship Game.

The 2001 season was Georgetown's second consecutive undefeated season and NAIA national championship. The team was led on offense by senior quarterback Eddie Eviston.

== Schedule ==
Date	Opponent	Site	Result	Attendance	Source
September 1	Saint Francis (IN)*	Rawlings Stadium; Georgetown, KY	W 41–7	1,863	
September 15	at Pikeville	Pikeville, KY	W 56–21	3,000	
September 22	Union (KY)	Rawlings Stadium; Georgetown, KY	W 48–13	1,717	
September 29	Virginia–Wise Cavaliers*	Rawlings Stadium; Georgetown, KY	W 59–14	2,500	
October 6	Cumberland (KY)	Rawlings Stadium; Georgetown, KY	W 70–7	2,604	
October 13	at Lambuth	L.L. Fonville Field; Jackson, TN	W 31–6	570	
October 20	Belhaven	Rawlings Stadium; Georgetown, KY	W 44–6	3,500	
October 27	at Campbellsville	Tiger Stadium; Campbellsville, KY	W 49–7	2,500	
November 3	Cumberland (TN)	Rawlings Stadium; Georgetown, KY	W 38–28	2,513	
November 10	at St. Joseph's (IN)*	Rensselaer, IN	W 47–14	1,000	
November 17	Tri-State*	Rawlings Stadium; Georgetown, KY (NAIA first round)	W 42–21	850	
November 24	Campbellsville	Rawlings Stadium; Georgetown, KY (NAIA quarterfinal)	W 76–9	1,216	
December 1	Carroll*	Rawlings Stadium; Georgetown, KY (NAIA semifinal)	W 31–22	812	
December 15	at Sioux Falls*	Jim Carroll Stadium; Savannah, TN (NAIA Championship Game)	W 49–27	6,789	
*Non-conference game
