= Georgetown Tigers football =

College football program

- First season: 1893; 133 years ago
- Athletic director: Brian Evans
- Head coach: John Perin; 1st season, 7–3 (.700)
- Location: Georgetown, Kentucky
- Stadium: Toyota Stadium (capacity: 5,000 (expandable to 20,000))
- League: NAIA
- Conference: Mid-South Conference
- Division: Bluegrass
- Colors: Black and orange

NAIA national championships
- NAIA: 2000, 2001 NAIA Division II: 1991

Conference championships
- 23
- Website: Georgetown Athletics

The Georgetown Tigers football program represents Georgetown College of Georgetown, Kentucky in college football. The Tigers have been one of the most successful football teams playing NAIA.

== Championships ==
=== National championships ===
The Tigers have won three national championships.

Year	Association	Division	Head coach	Record	Opponent	Result
1991	NAIA (3)	Division II (1)	Kevin Donley (1)	13–1 (6–0 MSC)	Pacific Lutheran	W, 28–20
2000	NAIA (3)	Single (2)	Bill Cronin (2)	14–0 (8–0 MSC)	NW Oklahoma State	W, 20–0
2001	NAIA (3)	Single (2)	Bill Cronin (2)	14–0 (7–0 MSC)	Sioux Falls	W, 49–27

- National Finalist – 1991, 1999, 2000, 2001, 2002
- National Semi-Finalist – 2004, 2011, 2023

=== Conference championships ===
- 19 Mid-South Conference Champions – 1987, 1989, 1990, 1991, 1992, 1993, 1998, 1999, 2000, 2001, 2002, 2003, 2004, 2005, 2006, 2010, 2011, 2012, 2015, 2023, 2024

=== Coaches of the year ===
- NAIA National Coach of the Year – Bill Cronin – 2000, 2001

== History ==
The team had rivalries with both Kentucky and Transylvania going back to the 19th century.

=== The Kevin Donley era ===
Kevin Donley has been one of the most successful coaches in NAIA football. Donley joined the Georgetown College staff as head coach in 1982. The high point of his career here came in 1991 when the Tigers went 13–1 (.929) and won the NAIA Division II National Football Championship. In the 14 games played that season, the Tigers scored 744 points, among the most of all college football teams at all levels of play. For his team's achievements, Donley was named the NAIA National Coach of the Year.

Following is a game-by-game recap of the Kevin Donley era:

==== 1982 ====
(2–9 overall, 1–6 conference)

Date	Opponent	Site	Result	Attendance	Source
September 4	West Virginia Tech*	Georgetown, KY	W 21–17		
September 11	at Northwood*	Midland, MI	L 13–70		
September 18	at Davidson*	Richardson Stadium; Davidson, NC	L 21–33	1,500	
September 25	at Emory & Henry*	Emory, VA	L 20–21		
October 2	at Franklin	Franklin, IN	L 6–41		
October 9	at Saint Joseph’s	Rensselaer, IN	L 14–31		
October 16	Butler	Georgetown, KY	L 0–39		
October 23	at Indianapolis	Indianapolis, IN	L 7–30		
October 30	Ashland	Georgetown, KY	L 0–56		
November 6	at Valparaiso	Valparaiso, IN	W 23–21		
November 13	at Evansville	Evansville, IN	L 14–59		
*Non-conference game

==== 1983 ====
(7–3)

Date	Opponent	Site	Result
September 10	at West Virginia Tech	Montgomery, WV	W 6–3
September 17	Kentucky Wesleyan	Georgetown, KY	W 16–14
September 24	at Emory & Henry		W 20–0
October 1	at Franklin		W 33–24
October 8	at Saint Joseph’s		W 29–27
October 15	at Butler	Indianapolis, IN	L 14–38
October 22	Indianapolis	Georgetown, KY	W 9–0
October 29	at Ashland	Ashland, OH	L 7–20
November 5	Valparaiso	Georgetown, KY	L 8–24
November 12	at Evansville		W 16–14

==== 1984 ====
(4–6)

Date	Opponent	Site	Result
September 1	at Morehead State	Morehead State, KY	L 0–31
September 8	at West Virginia Tech	Montgomery, WV	L 16–26
September 15	at Kentucky Wesleyan	Owensboro, KY	W 47–3
September 22	Emory & Henry	Georgetown, KY	W 17–0
September 29	at Butler	Indianapolis, IN	L 7–33
October 6	Ashland	Georgetown, KY	L 19–24
October 13	Franklin	Georgetown, KY	L 10–27
October 27	at Indianapolis	Indianapolis, IN	L 7–35
November 3	Evansville	Georgetown, KY	W 29–27
November 10	Saint Joseph’s	Georgetown, KY	W 30–0

==== 1985 ====
(4–6)

Date	Opponent	Site	Result
September 7	at West Virginia Tech	Montgomery, WV	L 9–22
September 14	at Carson-Newman		L 12–17
September 21	Kentucky Wesleyan	Georgetown, KY	W 16–12
September 28	Butler	Georgetown, KY	L 18–31
October 5	at Ashland	Ashland, OH	L 7–41
October 12	at Franklin		L 10–27
October 19	at Cumberlands	Williamsburg, KY	W 67–19
October 26	Indianapolis	Georgetown, KY	L 10–35
November 2	at Evansville		W 23–21
November 9	at Saint Joseph’s		W 41–14

==== 1986 ====
(6–4)

Date	Opponent	Site	Result
September 6	at Carson-Newman		L 14–38
September 13	Union	Georgetown, KY	W 31–0
September 20	at Kentucky Wesleyan	Owensboro, KY	W 47–14
September 27	at Hanover	Hanover, IN	W 31–18
October 4	Ashland	Georgetown, KY	L 21–23
October 11	at Franklin	Franklin, IN	L 19–24
October 18	Cumberlands	Georgetown, KY	W 34–6
October 25	at Indianapolis	Indianapolis, IN	L 13–30
November 1	at Evansville	Evansville, IN	W 21–14
November 8	West Virginia Tech	Georgetown, KY	W 39–0

==== 1987 ====
(8–3 overall, 3-1 conference)

Date	Opponent	Site	Result
September 12	Tiffin*	Georgetown, KY	W 41–14
September 19	at Union	Barbourville, KY	W 37–10
September 26	Hanover*	Georgetown, KY	W 37–14
October 3	at Urbana*	Urbana, IN	W 37–13
October 10	at Ashland*	Ashland, OH	L 20–27
October 17	at Cumberlands	Williamsburg, KY	W 34–24
October 24	at Franklin*	Franklin, IN	W 38–27
October 31	Indianapolis*	Georgetown, KY	W 31–9
November 7	at Evansville	Evansville, IN	L 3–7
November 14	Kentucky Wesleyan	Georgetown, KY	W 34–0
November 21	Westminster*	Lexington, KY (NAIA D-II First Round)	L 17–24
*Non-conference game

==== 1988 ====
(7–3 overall, 4–1 conference)

Date	Opponent	Site	Result
September 3	at St. Francis (IL)*		L 7–16
September 10	Union	Georgetown, KY	W 19–13
September 17	at Dayton*	Dayton, OH	L 7–23
September 24	at Hanover*	Hanover, IN	W 40–15
October 1	at Evansville		W 14–7
October 8	at Tiffin*	Tiffin, OH	W 7–0
October 15	at Franklin*		W 41–7
October 22	Cumberlands	Georgetown, KY	L 27–34
November 5	at Kentucky Wesleyan	Owensboro, KY	W 32–0
November 12	Campbellsville	Georgetown, KY	W 51–7
*Non-conference game

==== 1989 ====
(7–3–1 overall, 5–0 conference)

Date	Opponent	Site	Result
September 2	at Tennessee Wesleyan*		W 42–0
September 9	at St. Francis (IL)*		L 19–40
September 16	at Evansville		W 28–21
September 23	Hanover*	Georgetown, KY	T 14–14
September 30	at Union	Barbourville, KY	W 24–0
October 7	at Cumberlands	Williamsburg, KY	W 48–7
October 14	at Dayton*	Dayton, OH	L 7–27
October 21	at Franklin*		W 48–28
November 4	Kentucky Wesleyan	Georgetown, KY	W 55–0
November 11	at Campbellsville	Campbellsville, KY	W 63–6
November 18	at Westminster*	New Wilmington, PA (NAIA D-II First Round)	L 9–29
*Non-conference game

==== 1990 ====
(9–2 overall, 4–0 conference)

Date	Opponent	Site	Result
September 8	Findlay*	Georgetown, KY	W 21–14
September 15	Urbana*	Georgetown, KY	W 27–6
September 22	at Hanover*	Hanover, IN	L 14–17
September 29	Evansville	Georgetown, KY	W 37–14
October 6	Mount St. Joseph*	Georgetown, KY	W 63–0
October 13	Union	Georgetown, KY	W 62–15
October 20	Cumberlands	Georgetown, KY	W 64–24
October 27	at Tennessee Wesleyan*	Athens, TN	W 65–0
November 3	at Lambuth*	Jackson, TN	W 63–7
November 10	at Campbellsville	Campbellsville, KY	W 28–13
November 17	at Westminster*	New Wilmington, PA (NAIA D-II First Round)	L 13–47
*Non-conference game

==== 1991 ====
(13–1 overall, 6–0 conference)

Date	Opponent	Site	Result
September 14	at Mount St. Joseph*	Cincinnati, OH	W 53–14
September 21	at Urbana*	Urbana, OH	W 78–25
September 28	Hanover*	Georgetown, KY	W 55–46
October 5	at Evansville	Evansville, IN	W 56–10
October 12	Shepherd*	Georgetown, KY	L 31–34
October 19	at Union	Barbourville, KY	W 49–26
October 26	at Cumberlands	Williamsburg, KY	W 63–7
November 2	Tusculum	Georgetown, KY	W 70–7
November 9	Lambuth	Georgetown, KY	W 77–0
November 16	Campbellsville	Georgetown, KY	W 63–14
November 23	Eureka*	Georgetown, KY (NAIA D-II First Round)	W 42–14
December 7	at Findlay*	Findlay, OH (NAIA D-II Quarterfinal)	W 37–19
December 14	Peru State*	Georgetown, KY (NAIA D-II Semifinal)	W 42–28
December 21	Pacific Lutheran*	Georgetown, KY (NAIA D-II Championship)	W 28–20
*Non-conference game

==== 1992 ====
(8–3 overall, 4–1 conference)

Date	Opponent	Site	Result
September 12	Mount St. Joseph*	Georgetown, KY	W 60–8
September 19	Urbana*	Georgetown, KY	W 49–8
September 26	at Knoxville*		W 60–32
October 3	at Olivet Nazarene*	Bourbonnais, IL	W 42–17
October 10	at Westminster*	New Wilmington, PA	L 6–25
October 17	Union	Georgetown, KY	W 48–41
October 24	Cumberlands	Georgetown, KY	W 61–0
October 31	at Tusculum	Greeneville, TN	W 35–25
November 7	at Lambuth	Jackson, TN	W 48–32
November 14	at Campbellsville	Campbellsville, KY	L 27–29
November 21	at Findlay*	Findlay, OH (NAIA D-II First Round)	L 14–32
*Non-conference game

=== Other notable years ===
==== 2001 ====
The Kentucky State Senate honored the 2001 team.
