= Craig Bagnell =

American football coach (born c. 1990)

Biographical details
- Born: c. 1990 (age 35–36); Polson, Montana, U.S.
- Education: University of Mary (2014); Bemidji State University (2016)

Playing career
- 2009–2013: Mary
- Position: Quarterback

Coaching career (HC unless noted)
- 2014: Bemidji State (WR)
- 2015–2017: Bemidji State (OC/QB)
- 2018–2022: Mary
- 2023: South Dakota (WR)

Head coaching record
- Overall: 9–35

Accomplishments and honors

Awards
- Second-team All-NSIC (2012)

Craig Bagnell (born c. 1990) is an American college football coach. He was the wide receivers coach for the University of South Dakota in 2023. He was the head football coach for the University of Mary from 2018 to 2022. He also coached for Bemidji State. He played college football for Mary as a quarterback.

== Head coaching record ==
Year	Team	Overall	Conference	Standing	Bowl/playoffs
Mary Marauders (Northern Sun Intercollegiate Conference) (2018–2022)
2018	Mary	1–10	1–10	T–6th (North)	
2019	Mary	2–9	2–9	7th (North)	
2020–21	No team—COVID-19				
2021	Mary	4–7	3–3	5th (North)	
2022	Mary	2–9	2–9	5th (North)	
Mary:		9–35	8–31		
Total:		9–35			
