= 2001 Saint Francis Cougars football team =

American college football season

2001 Saint Francis Cougars football

NAIA Playoff Participant MSFA (MEL) co-champion
- Conference: Mid-States Football Association
- Mideast League
- Record: 9–2 (5–1 MSFA (MEL))
- Head coach: Kevin Donley (4th season)
- Home stadium: Cougar Stadium

2001 Mid-States Football Association standings
| | Conf. | | | Overall |
| Team | W | | L | W | | L |
|---|---|---|---|---|---|---|
Mideast League
| No. 14 Saint Francis (IN) x^ | 5 | – | 1 | 9 | – | 2 |
| No. 11 Tri-State x^ | 5 | – | 1 | 8 | – | 3 |
| No. 20 Walsh x | 5 | – | 1 | 8 | – | 3 |
| Tiffin | 3 | – | 3 | 3 | – | 8 |
| Geneva | 2 | – | 4 | 4 | – | 6 |
| Malone | 1 | – | 5 | 2 | – | 8 |
| Urbana | 0 | – | 6 | 1 | – | 9 |
Midwest League
| No. 12 St. Ambrose x^ | 7 | – | 0 | 8 | – | 3 |
| No. 15 McKendree ^ | 6 | – | 1 | 8 | – | 3 |
| Trinity International | 4 | – | 3 | 8 | – | 3 |
| No. 25 Saint Xavier | 4 | – | 3 | 7 | – | 4 |
| St. Francis (IL) | 3 | – | 4 | 4 | – | 6 |
| Taylor | 2 | – | 5 | 2 | – | 8 |
| Olivet Nazarene | 1 | – | 6 | 2 | – | 8 |
| Iowa Wesleyan | 1 | – | 6 | 1 | – | 9 |
x – League champion/co-champions ^ – NAIA playoff participant; Rankings from NAIA Coaches' Poll

The 2001 Saint Francis Cougars football team represented the University of Saint Francis, located in Fort Wayne, Indiana, in the 2001 NAIA football season. They were led by head coach Kevin Donley, who served his 4th year as the first and only head coach in the history of Saint Francis football. The Cougars played their home games at Cougar Stadium and were members of the Mid-States Football Association (MSFA) Mideast League (MEL). The Cougars finished in tie for 1st place in the MSFA MEL division. Both co-champions received invitations to the 2001 postseason NAIA playoffs.

== Schedule ==
(9–2 overall, 5–1 conference)

| Date | Opponent | Site | Result | Attendance |
|---|---|---|---|---|
| September 1 | Butler* | Cougar Stadium; Fort Wayne, IN | W 41–20 | 3,000 |
| September 8 | at Iowa Wesleyan* | Mapleleaf Stadium; Mount Pleasant, IA | W 49–0 | 380 |
| September 15 | Wisconsin - LaCrosse* | Cougar Stadium; Fort Wayne, IN | W 20–12 | 1,000 |
| September 22 | McKendree* | Cougar Stadium; Fort Wayne, IN | W 23–15 | 2,700 |
| September 29 | Geneva | Cougar Stadium; Fort Wayne, IN | W 30–6 | 1,900 |
| October 6 | at Tiffin | Frost Kalnow Stadium; Tiffin, OH | W 20–14 | |
| October 13 | Urbana | Cougar Stadium; Fort Wayne, IN | W 42–38 | 2,800 |
| October 27 | at Malone | Fawcett Stadium; Canton, OH | W 58–17 | 1,000 |
| November 3 | Tri-State | Cougar Stadium; Fort Wayne, IN | L 20–27 | 4,000 |
| November 10 | at Walsh | Fawcett Stadium; Canton, OH | W 30–12 | |
| November 17 | Campbellsville* | Tiger Stadium; Campbellsville, KY (NAIA First Round) | L 21–42 | 2,500 |
*Non-conference game

== Ranking movements ==
Ranking movements Legend: ██ Increase in ranking ██ Decrease in ranking
| | Week | | | | | | | | | | |
| Poll | Pre | 1 | 2 | 3 | 4 | 5 | 6 | 7 | 8 | 9 | Final |
|---|---|---|---|---|---|---|---|---|---|---|---|
| NAIA Coaches' Poll | 5 | 5 | 2 | 2 | 2 | 2 | 2 | 2 | 8 | 8 | 14 |
