= 2001 NAIA football season =

American college football season

- National Championship: Jim Carroll Stadium; Savannah, TN; December 15, 2001
- Champion: Georgetown (KY)
- Player of the Year: Eddie Eviston (quarterback, Georgetown (KY))

The 2001 NAIA football season was the component of the 2001 college football season organized by the National Association of Intercollegiate Athletics (NAIA) in the United States. The season's playoffs, known as the NAIA Football National Championship, culminated with the championship game on December 15, at Jim Carroll Stadium in Savannah, Tennessee. The Georgetown Tigers defeated the Sioux Falls Cougars, 49–27, in the title game to win the program's second consecutive and third overall NAIA championship.

== Conference standings ==
2001 Central States Football League standings
	Conf.			Overall
Team	W		L	W		L
No. 9 NW Oklahoma State $^	4	–	0	7	–	3
Peru State	3	–	1	5	–	5
Langston	2	–	2	4	–	7
SAGU	1	–	3	1	–	9
Haskell	0	–	4	0	–	11
Bacone	0	–	0	5	–	5
$ – Conference champion; ^ – NAIA playoff participant; Rankings from NAIA Coaches' Poll

2001 Dakota Athletic Conference football standings
	Conf.			Overall
Team	W		L	W		L
No. 8 Mary $^	9	–	0	9	–	1
No. 13 Valley City State	8	–	1	9	–	2
No. 21 Huron	7	–	2	7	–	3
Dickinson State	6	–	3	6	–	4
Jamestown	5	–	4	5	–	5
Minot State	4	–	5	4	–	6
Black Hills State	2	–	7	3	–	7
Dakota State	2	–	7	2	–	8
South Dakota Mines	2	–	7	2	–	8
Mayville State	0	–	9	0	–	10
$ – Conference champion; ^ – NAIA playoff participant; Rankings from NAIA Coaches' Poll

2001 Frontier Conference football standings
	Conf.			Overall
Team	W		L	W		L
No. 3 Carroll (MT) $^	7	–	1	10	–	2
No. 16 Montana Tech	7	–	1	8	–	3
Rocky Mountain	2	–	6	3	–	7
Montana State–Northern	2	–	6	3	–	8
Montana Western	2	–	6	2	–	8
$ – Conference champion; ^ – NAIA playoff participant; Rankings from NAIA Coaches' Poll

2001 Great Plains Athletic Conference football standings
	Conf.			Overall
Team	W		L	W		L
No. 2 Sioux Falls +^	7	–	1	12	–	2
No. 7 Concordia (NE) +^	7	–	1	10	–	2
No. 18 Hastings	6	–	2	8	–	2
Doane	5	–	3	6	–	3
Midland Lutheran	3	–	5	5	–	5
Northwestern (IA)	3	–	5	5	–	5
Nebraska Wesleyan	3	–	5	5	–	5
Dana	1	–	7	3	–	7
Dakota Wesleyan	1	–	7	2	–	8
+ – Conference co-champions; ^ – NAIA playoff participant; Rankings from NAIA Coaches' Poll

2001 Heart of America Athletic Conference football standings
	Conf.			Overall
Team	W		L	W		L
No. 6 Evangel $^	10	–	0	11	–	1
No. 4 Benedictine (KS) ^	9	–	1	12	–	2
MidAmerica Nazarene	7	–	3	8	–	3
Culver–Stockton	5	–	5	6	–	5
Graceland	5	–	5	5	–	5
Missouri Valley	5	–	5	5	–	5
Baker	5	–	5	5	–	6
William Jewell	4	–	6	4	–	6
Lindenwood	3	–	7	3	–	8
Avila	2	–	8	2	–	8
Central Methodist	0	–	10	1	–	10
$ – Conference champion; ^ – NAIA playoff participant; Rankings from NAIA Coaches' Poll

2001 Kansas Collegiate Athletic Conference football standings
	Conf.			Overall
Team	W		L	W		L
No. 19 Bethany (KS) +	8	–	1	8	–	1
No. 17 Kansas Wesleyan +^	8	–	1	8	–	3
Ottawa	6	–	3	6	–	4
Southwestern (KS)	6	–	3	6	–	4
Friends	5	–	4	5	–	4
Tabor	4	–	5	5	–	5
Sterling	4	–	5	4	–	6
McPherson	2	–	7	3	–	7
Saint Mary (KS)	1	–	8	1	–	8
Bethel (KS)	1	–	8	1	–	9
+ – Conference co-champions; ^ – NAIA playoff participant; Rankings from NAIA Coaches' Poll

2001 Mid-South Conference football standings
	Conf.			Overall
Team	W		L	W		L
No. 1 Georgetown (KY) $^	7	–	0	14	–	0
No. 10 Campbellsville ^	5	–	2	10	–	3
No. 23 Cumberland (TN)	4	–	2	6	–	3
Belhaven	3	–	4	4	–	6
Lambuth	3	–	4	3	–	6
Union (KY)	2	–	4	2	–	7
Pikeville	2	–	5	3	–	7
Cumberland (KY)	1	–	6	3	–	6
$ – Conference champion; ^ – NAIA playoff participant; Rankings from NAIA Coaches' Poll

2001 Mid-States Football Association standings
	Conf.			Overall
Team	W		L	W		L
Mideast League
No. 14 Saint Francis (IN) x^	5	–	1	9	–	2
No. 11 Tri-State x^	5	–	1	8	–	3
No. 20 Walsh x	5	–	1	8	–	3
Tiffin	3	–	3	3	–	8
Geneva	2	–	4	4	–	6
Malone	1	–	5	2	–	8
Urbana	0	–	6	1	–	9
Midwest League
No. 12 St. Ambrose x^	7	–	0	8	–	3
No. 15 McKendree ^	6	–	1	8	–	3
Trinity International	4	–	3	8	–	3
No. 25 Saint Xavier	4	–	3	7	–	4
St. Francis (IL)	3	–	4	4	–	6
Taylor	2	–	5	2	–	8
Olivet Nazarene	1	–	6	2	–	8
Iowa Wesleyan	1	–	6	1	–	9
x – League champion/co-champions ^ – NAIA playoff participant; Rankings from NAIA Coaches' Poll

2001 NAIA independents football records
	Conf.			Overall
Team	W		L	W		L
No. 5 Southern Oregon ^		–		9	–	2
Virginia–Wise		–		6	–	4
Azusa Pacific		–		4	–	5
Paul Quinn		–		3	–	4
Edward Waters		–		2	–	8
^ – NAIA playoff participant; Rankings from NAIA Coaches' Poll
