= 2001 NAIA football national championship =

2001 NAIA Football Championship
	1st	2nd	3rd	4th	Total
Sioux Falls (SD)	7	6	7	7	27
Georgetown (KY)	7	21	14	7	49
- Date: December 12, 2001
- Stadium: Jim Carroll Stadium
- City: Savannah, Tennessee
- MOP (Offense): Eddie Eviston, Georgetown
- MOP (Defense): B.J. Mattingly, Georgetown
- Officials: Jim Ryan
- Attendance: 6,789

The 2001 NAIA football championship series concluded on December 15, 2001 with the championship game played at Jim Carroll Stadium in Savannah, Tennessee. The game was won by the Georgetown Tigers over the Sioux Falls Cougars by a score of 49–27. The win was the second consecutive championship for the Tigers.

== Scoring Summary ==
Scoring summary

Quarter	Time	Drive			Team	Scoring information	Score	
Quarter	Time	Plays	Yards	TOP	Team	Scoring information	Sioux Falls Cougars	Georgetown (KY) Tigers
1	8:57	7	48	2:20	Georgetown (KY) Tigers	Ryan Payne 13-yard touchdown run, Kevin Davis kick Good	0	7
1	4:56	10	66	4:01	Sioux Falls Cougars	Zach Rutten 20-yard touchdown reception from Dax Michelena, Matt Kuiper kick Good	7	7
2	12:28	8	38	2:46	Georgetown (KY) Tigers	Ryan Payne 2-yard touchdown run, Kevin Davis kick Good	7	14
2	9:01	7	80	3:27	Sioux Falls Cougars	Dax Michelena 1-yard touchdown run, Matt Kuiper kick Failed	13	14
2	3:15	13	78	5:46	Georgetown (KY) Tigers	Jason Tenkman 1-yard touchdown run, Kevin Davis kick Failed	13	20
2	0:24	7	48	1:39	Georgetown (KY) Tigers	Brandon Midkiff 35-yard touchdown reception from Eddie Eviston, 2-point Eddie Eviston Rush Good	13	28
3	13:29	1	51	0:12	Georgetown (KY) Tigers	Derrick White 51-yard touchdown run, Kevin Davis kick Good	13	35
3	9:44	3	35	1:08	Sioux Falls Cougars	Nick Kortan 2-yard touchdown run, Matt Kuiper kick Good	20	35
3	5:49	9	61	3:55	Georgetown (KY) Tigers	Nick Ayers 1-yard touchdown run, Kevin Davis kick Good	20	42
4	10:39	6	60	2:15	Georgetown (KY) Tigers	Michael Caba 18-yard touchdown reception from Eddie Eviston, Kevin Davis kick Good	20	49
4	7:55	14	76	2:44	Sioux Falls Cougars	Nick Kortan 37-yard touchdown reception from Dax Michelena, Matt Kuiper kick Good	27	49
"TOP" = time of possession. For other American football terms, see Glossary of American football.							Sioux Falls Cougars	Georgetown (KY) Tigers

== Tournament bracket ==
1st Round; November 17
1	Georgetown (KY)	42
10	Tri-State (IN)	21
9	Saint Francis (IN)	21
15	Campbellsville (KY)	42
4	Carroll (MT)	45
12	Valley City State	27
7	Southern Oregon	54
16	McKendree (IL)	10
2	Mary (ND)	21
5	Sioux Falls (SD)	27*
8	Concordia (NE)	31
13	Saint Ambrose (IA)	26
3	Evangel (MO)	48
14	Kansas Wesleyan	0
6	Benedictine (KS)	29
11	Northwestern Oklahoma State	27

Quarterfinals; November 24
1	Georgetown (KY)	76
15	Campbellsville (KY)	9
4	Carroll (MT)	16
7	Southern Oregon	12
5	Sioux Falls (SD)	34
8	Concordia (NE)	0
3	Evangel (MO)	30
6	Benedictine (KS)	34

Semifinals; December 1
1	Georgetown (KY)	31
4	Carroll (MT)	22
5	Sioux Falls (SD)	40
6	Benedictine (KS)	6

Championship; December 15
1	Georgetown (KY)	49
5	Sioux Falls (SD)	27

- * denotes OT.

== See also ==
- 2001 NAIA football rankings
