= 2000 NAIA football national championship =

2000 NAIA Football Championship
	1st	2nd	3rd	4th	Total
Georgetown (KY)	14	0	0	6	20
Northwestern Oklahoma State	0	0	0	0	0
- Date: December 16, 2000
- Stadium: Jim Carroll Stadium
- City: Savannah, Tennessee
- MOP (Offense): Cody Brown, Georgetown
- MOP (Defense): Brian Landis, Georgetown
- Officials: Larry Clemmons
- Attendance: 6,650

The 2000 NAIA football championship series concluded on December 16, 2000, with the championship game played at Jim Carroll Stadium in Savannah, Tennessee. The game featured the same two teams that met for the prior season's title, but the outcome was flipped this time. Unlike last year's matchup, This game was won by the Georgetown Tigers over the Northwestern Oklahoma State Rangers by a score of 20–0.

== Scoring Summary ==
Scoring summary

Quarter	Time	Drive			Team	Scoring information	Score	
Quarter	Time	Plays	Yards	TOP	Team	Scoring information	Georgetown (KY) Tigers	Northwestern Oklahoma State Rangers
1	11:01	2	61	0:19	Georgetown (KY) Tigers	Cody Brown 61-yard touchdown reception from Eddie Eviston, Kevin Davis kick Failed	6	0
1	11:01	3	75	1:30	Georgetown (KY) Tigers	Cody Brown 82-yard touchdown reception from Eddie Eviston, 2-point Nick Ayers Pass Good	14	0
1	11:01	3	75	1:30	Georgetown (KY) Tigers	Cody Brown 75-yard touchdown reception from Eddie Eviston, Kevin Davis kick Failed	20	0
"TOP" = time of possession. For other American football terms, see Glossary of American football.							Georgetown (KY) Tigers	Northwestern Oklahoma State Rangers

== Tournament bracket ==
1st Round; November 18
1	NW Oklahoma State	40
14	Nebraska Wesleyan	13
4	MidAmerica Nazarene	27
19	Azusa Pacific	21
3	Benedictine (KS)	26
5	Northwestern (IA)	27
11	Saint Ambrose (IA)	27
12	Mary (ND)	7
2	Georgetown (KY)	55
13	Olivet Nazarene	6
7	Saint Francis (IN)	48
10	Lambuth (TN)	33
8	Huron (SD)	47
9	Ottawa (KS)	17
6	Valley City State	21
16	Carroll (MT)	24

Quarterfinals; November 25
1	NW Oklahoma State	31
4	MidAmerica Nazarene	27
5	Northwestern (IA)	21
11	Saint Ambrose (IA)	14
2	Georgetown (KY)	37
7	Saint Francis (IN)	19
8	Huron (SD)	17
16	Carroll (MT)	31

Semifinals; December 2
1	NW Oklahoma State	42
5	Northwestern (IA)	7
2	Georgetown (KY)	28
16	Carroll (MT)	21

Championship; December 16
1	NW Oklahoma State	0
2	Georgetown (KY)	20

- * denotes OT.

== See also ==
- 2000 NAIA football rankings
