= 2000 Saint Francis Cougars football team =

American college football season

2000 Saint Francis Cougars football

NAIA Playoff Quarterfinalist MSFA (MEL) champion
- Conference: Mid-States Football Association
- Mideast League
- Record: 10–2 (6–0 MSFA (MEL))
- Head coach: Kevin Donley (3rd season)
- Home stadium: Cougar Stadium

2000 Mid-States Football Association standings
	Conf.			Overall
Team	W		L	W		L
Mideast League
No. 6 Saint Francis (IN) x^	6	–	0	10	–	2
Walsh	4	–	2	6	–	5
No. 21 Geneva	3	–	3	7	–	3
Tri-State	3	–	3	6	–	5
Malone	2	–	4	4	–	7
Tiffin	2	–	4	3	–	7
Urbana	1	–	5	1	–	9
Midwest League
No. 7 St. Ambrose x^	7	–	0	9	–	3
No. 15 Olivet Nazarene ^	6	–	1	8	–	3
No. 19 McKendree	5	–	2	7	–	3
Saint Xavier	4	–	3	6	–	4
St. Francis (IL)	3	–	4	5	–	6
Taylor	2	–	5	3	–	7
Trinity International	1	–	6	4	–	7
Iowa Wesleyan	0	–	7	0	–	10
x – League champion/co-champions ^ – NAIA playoff participant; Rankings from NAIA Coaches' Poll

The 2000 Saint Francis Cougars football team represented the University of Saint Francis, located in Fort Wayne, Indiana, in the 2000 NAIA football season. They were led by head coach Kevin Donley, who served his 3rd year as the first and only head coach in the history of Saint Francis football. The Cougars played their home games at Cougar Stadium and were members of the Mid-States Football Association (MSFA) Mideast League (MEL). The Cougars finished in 1st place in the MSFA MEL division, receiving an automatic bid to the 2000 postseason NAIA playoffs.

== Schedule ==
(10–2 overall, 6-0 conference)

Date	Opponent	Rank	Site	Result	Attendance
September 2	at Butler*	No. 9	Bud and Jackie Sellick Bowl; Indianapolis, IN	W 56–37	
September 9	Iowa Wesleyan*	No. 9	Cougar Stadium; Fort Wayne, IN	W 84–9	
September 16	Valparaiso*	No. 4	Cougar Stadium; Fort Wayne, IN	W 34–30	
September 23	at McKendree*	No. 3	Lebanon, IL	L 14–28	
September 30	at Geneva	No. 9	Reeves Field; Beaver Falls, PA	W 21–20	
October 7	Tiffin	No. 5	Cougar Stadium; Fort Wayne, IN	W 42–13	
October 14	at Urbana	No. 5(T)	Urbana, OH	W 44–14	
October 28	Malone	No. 5	Cougar Stadium; Fort Wayne, IN	W 48–10	
November 4	at Tri-State	No. 5	Angola, IN	W 21–14	
November 11	Walsh	No. 3(T)	Cougar Stadium; Fort Wayne, IN	W 42–14	
November 18	Lambuth*	No. 7	Cougar Stadium; Fort Wayne, IN (NAIA First Round)	W 48–33	
November 25	at Georgetown*	No. 7	Rawlings Stadium; Georgetown, KY (NAIA Quarterfinal)	L 19–37	900
*Non-conference game; Rankings from Coaches' Poll released prior to the game

== Ranking movements ==
Ranking movements Legend: ██ Increase in ranking ██ Decrease in ranking т = Tied with team above or below ( ) = First-place votes
	Week											
Poll	Pre	1	2	3	4	5	6	7	8	9	10	Final
NAIA Coaches' Poll	9	4	3	9	5	5(T)	5	5	5	3(T)	7	6
