= 2001 Northwestern Eagles football team =

American college football season

2001 Northwestern Eagles football

UMAC champion
- Conference: Upper Midwest Athletic Conference
- Record: 9–0 (6–0 UMAC)
- Head coach: Kirk Talley (1st season)

The 2001 Northwestern Eagles football team was an American football team that represented Northwestern College (now known as University of Northwestern – St. Paul) as a member of the Upper Midwest Athletic Conference (UMAC) during the 2001 NCAA Division III football season. In their first year under head coach Kirk Talley, the Eagles compiled a perfect 9–0 record (6–0 against UMAC opponents), won the UMAC championship, and outscored opponents by a total of 358 to 69.

The team ran a balanced offense, averaging 204 rushing yards and 223.9 passing yards per game. On defense, they gave up an average of 52 rushing yards and 154.9 passing yards per game. The individual statistical leaders included Joe Wise with 1,324 rushing yards, 19 touchdowns, and 114 points scored; Dave Griffieth with 1,937 passing yards and 17 passing touchdowns; T. Naki with 38 receptions for 598 receiving yards; and B. Taylor with 77 total tackles.

Talley was hired as the head coach in March 2001. He had previously been head coach at Crown (MN) and Mount Senario College. Talley remained head coach of Northwestern for 16 years.

== Schedule ==
Date	Opponent	Site	Result	Attendance	Source
September 1	North Park	Saint Paul, MN	W 32–13		
September 8	at Carleton	Northfield, MN	W 29–20		
September 21	at Blackburn	Carlinville, IL	W 54–3		
September 22	at Trinity Bible	Ellendale, ND	W 25–0		
September 29	Marantha	Saint Paul, MN	W 48–0		
October 6	Martin Luther	Saint Paul, MN	W 39–0		
October 13	at Crown (MN)	St. Bonefacius, MN	W 50–0		
October 20	at Mount Senario	Ladysmith, WI	W 49–14		
October 26	vs. Martin Luther	Hubert H. Humphrey Metrodome; Minneapolis, MN	W 32–13		
