= Mary Marauders =

- University: University of Mary
- Conference: Northern Sun Intercollegiate Conference
- NCAA: Division II
- Athletic director: Marcus Wagner
- Location: Bismarck, North Dakota
- Varsity teams: 17
- Football stadium: MDU Resources Bowl
- Basketball arena: McDowell Activity Center
- Baseball stadium: Bismarck Municipal Ballpark
- Soccer stadium: MDU Resources Bowl
- Mascot: Maximus
- Nickname: Marauders
- Colors: Blue, white, and orange
- Website: goumary.com
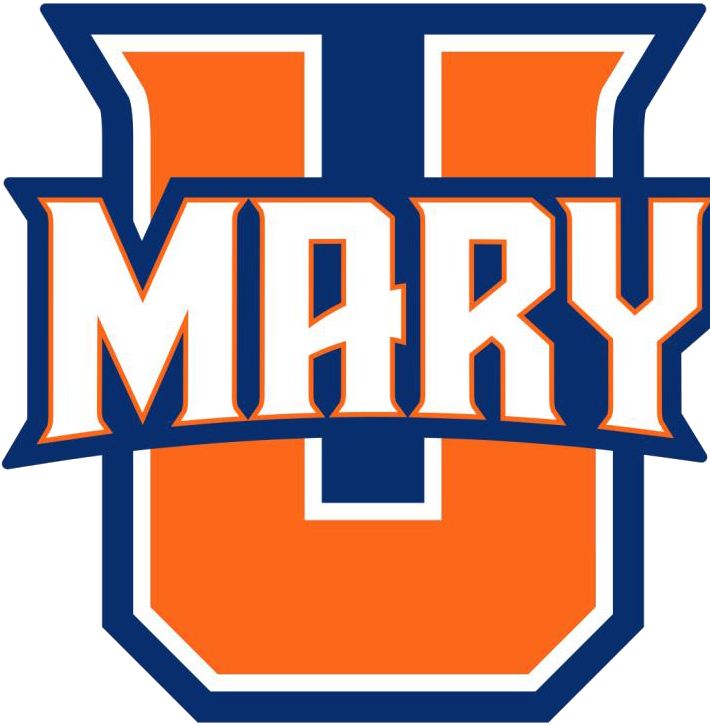

The Marauders are the athletic teams that represent the University of Mary, located in Bismarck, North Dakota, in NCAA Division II intercollegiate sports. The Marauders compete as members of the Northern Sun Intercollegiate Conference for all 16 varsity sports . The University also is home to an ACHA men's hockey team. As of November 11, 2019, the University of Mary has discontinued their men's soccer program after 25 seasons of playing in the Great Northwest Athletic Conference.

== Marauders history ==
Athletics at the University of Mary began in 1970 when Fritz Fell was brought on board to start a men's basketball program. Al Bortke succeeded Fell in 1973 as the men's basketball coach and athletic director and over the next 36 years would develop an athletic program that enjoyed tremendous success at the National Association of Intercollegiate Athletics level and later in NCAA Division II. After achieving a record of 335–156 in 16 years as the men's basketball coach that included 11 20-win seasons, Bortke became U-Mary's first full-time athletic director in 1989. During Bortke's tenure, Mary grew from one varsity sport (men's basketball) in 1970, to as many as 19 and the Marauders athletic program became a national power. Bortke is a member of both the Marauders and NAIA athletic halls of fame.

== Conference ==
The University of Mary is a member of NCAA Division II and the Northern Sun Intercollegiate Conference and offers nine varsity sports for women and eight for men.

== Varsity sports ==
| Men's sports | Women's sports |
|---|---|
| Basketball | Basketball |
| Cross country | Cross country |
| Football | Soccer |
| Ice hockey | Softball |
| Track & field | Track & field |
| Wrestling | Swimming |
| | Tennis |
| | Volleyball |

== Records ==
Mary Marauders in key sports
| Sport | Overall record | | Postseason record | | Playoff appearances | Conference Titles | Home stadium |
| Sport | W | L | W | L | Playoff appearances | Conference Titles | Home stadium |
|---|---|---|---|---|---|---|---|
| Football (Note: Also one tied game, although ties have been impossible in college football since 1995) | 191 | 181 | 6 | 10 | 9 (1993, 1995, 1996, 1998, 1999, 2000, 2001, 2002, 2003) | 7 (1992, 1996, 1998, 1999, 2001, 2002, 2004 | MDU Resources Community Bowl (7,000) |
| Baseball | | | | | | | |
| Men's basketball | 778 | 688 | | | | | McDowell Activity Center (2,500) |
| Women's basketball | 739 | 58 | | | | 2000 (National Champions} | McDowell Activity Center (2,500) |

== Notable athletes ==
- Craig Bagnell
- Mike Capaccio
- Todd Hendricks
- Clarence McKinney
- Tim Miles
- Brayden Thomas
- Marquice Williams
- Patrick O'Connell (American football)

== Mascot ==
The mascot or nickname "Marauders" was chosen by a selection process of the student body in the early 1970s. Timothy George, prominent theologian and founding Dean of Beeson Divinity School, offered commentary on the choice of this mascot for a Catholic school in an essay published in First Things in 2014, Mary on the Prairie. In 2017 the University unveiled in its campus restaurant a life-sized statue of a Marauder as a barbary corsair absorbed in conversation with Saint John of Matha. In 2018 the mascot was dubbed "Maximus," a nod to Maximus the Confessor.

== Gallery ==
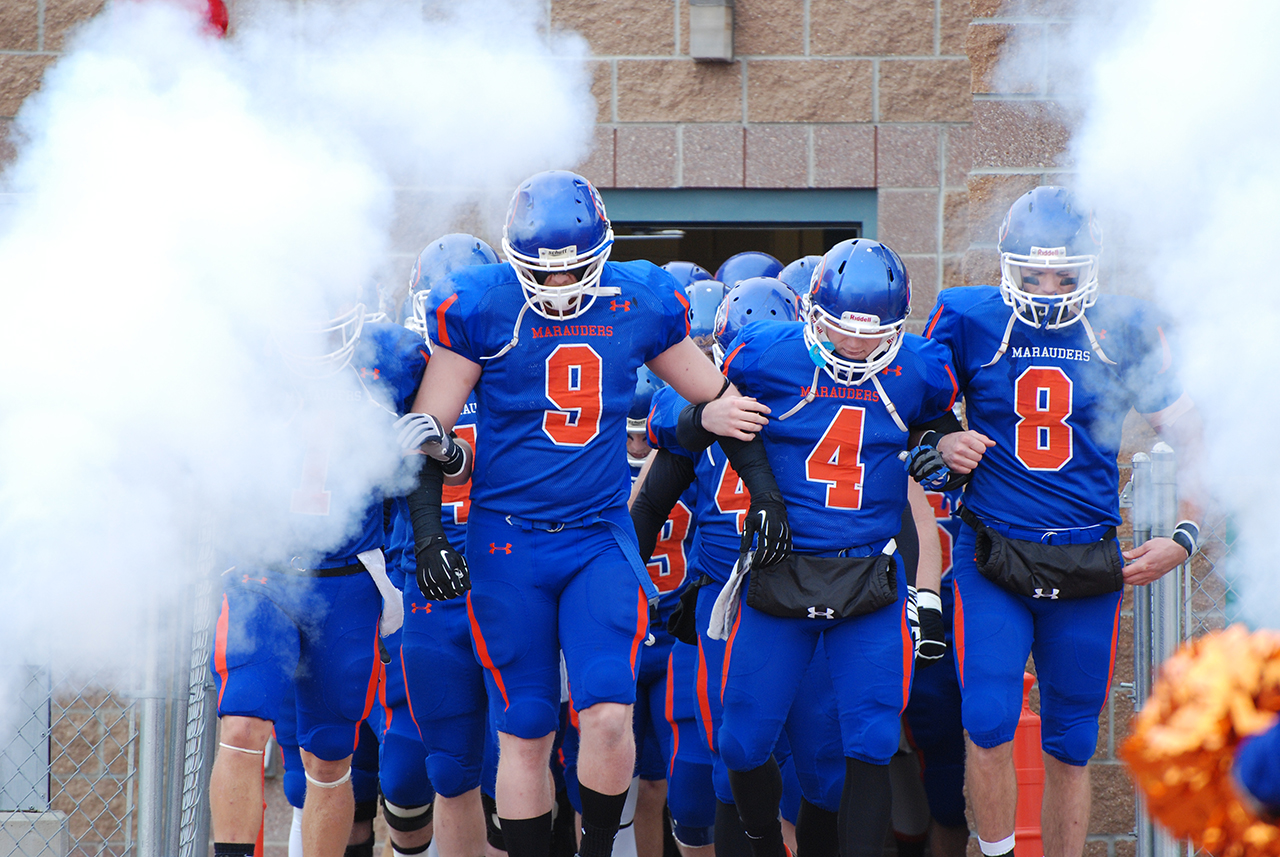
Marauders Football takes the field.

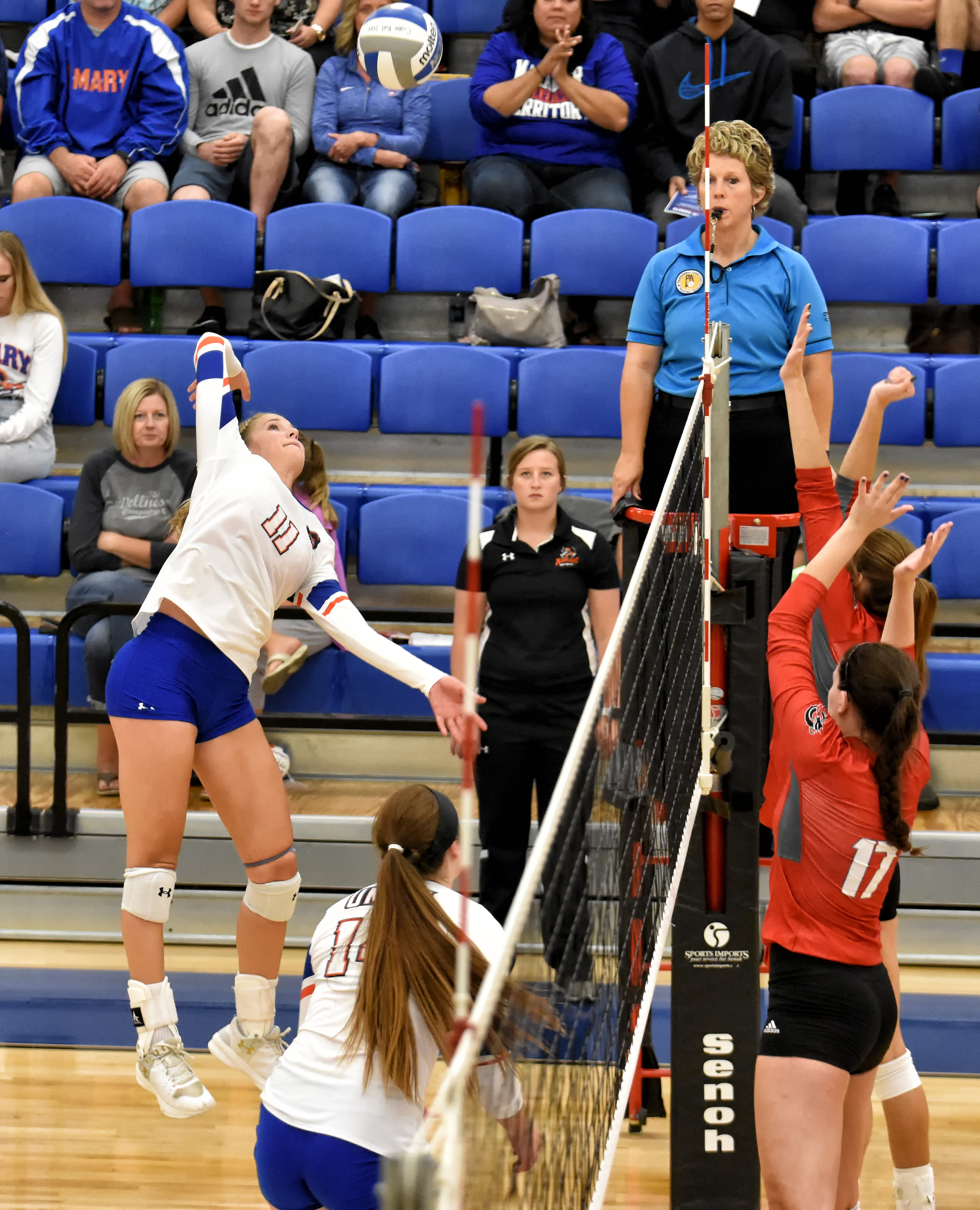
Marauders Volleyball match in the Marauders Activity Center

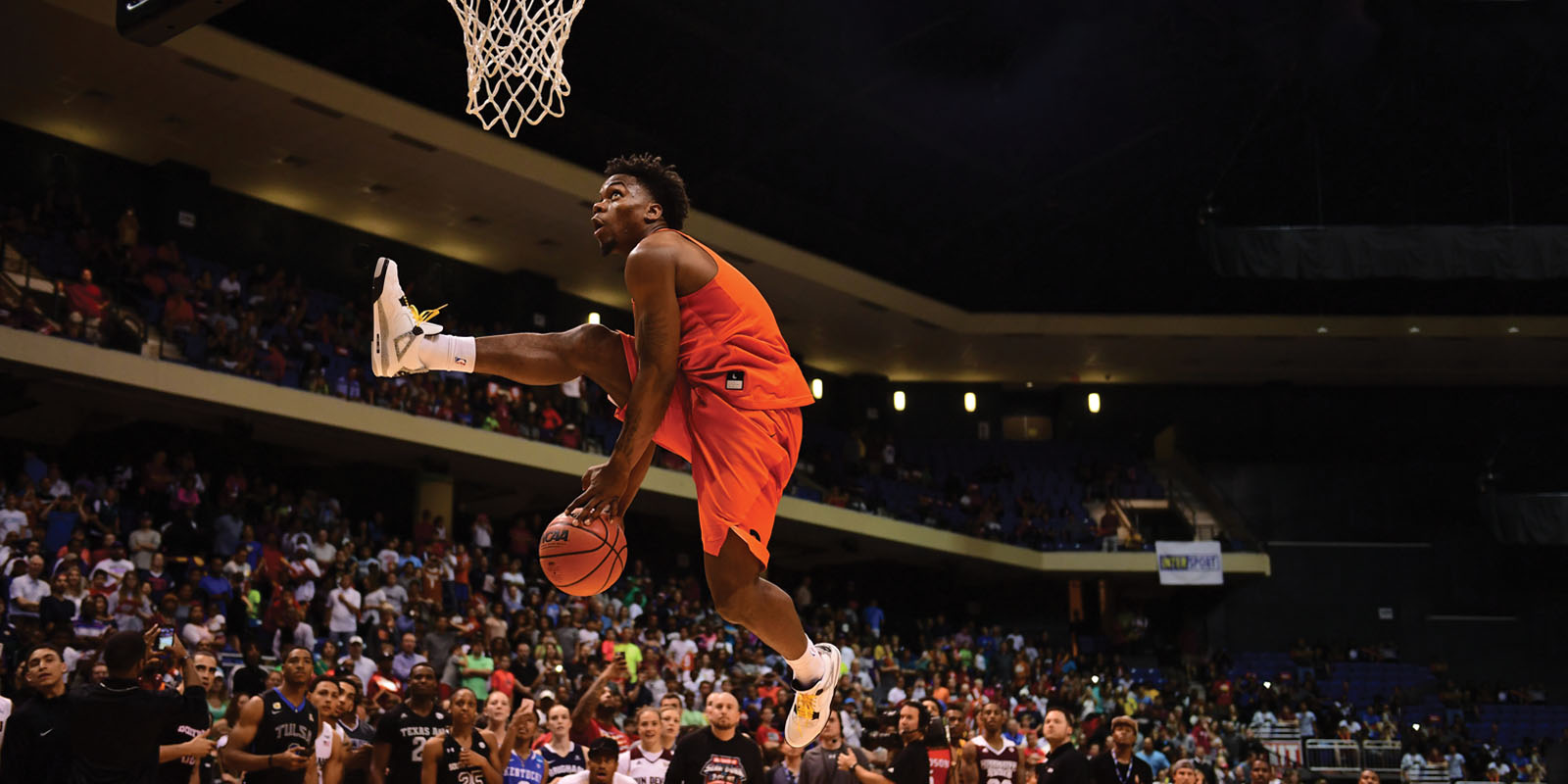
Marauders Basketball's Devon Douglas winning the NCAA Slam Dunk Contest

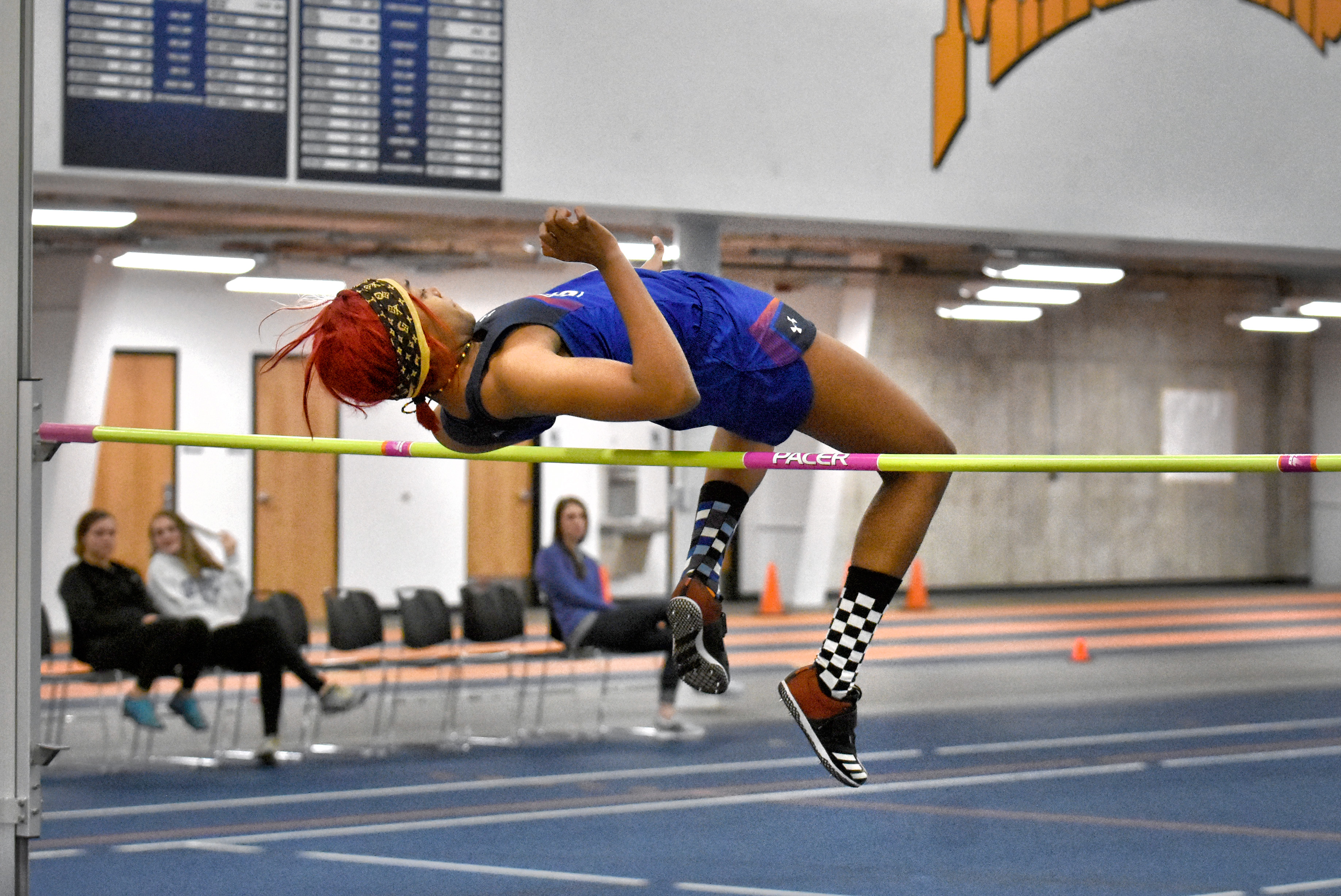
Marauders indoor track competition in the UMary Fieldhouse

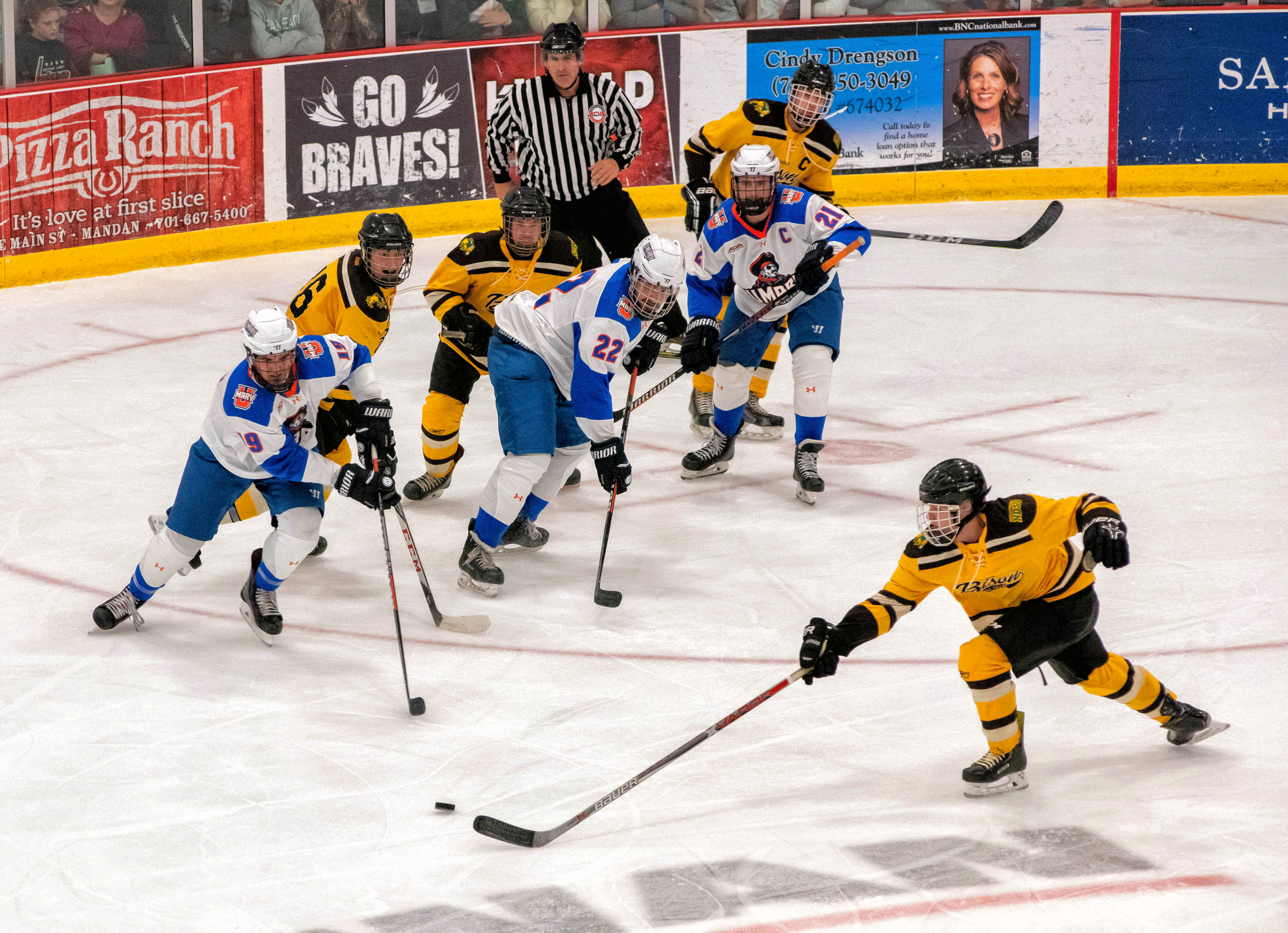
Marauders Hockey player races for the puck

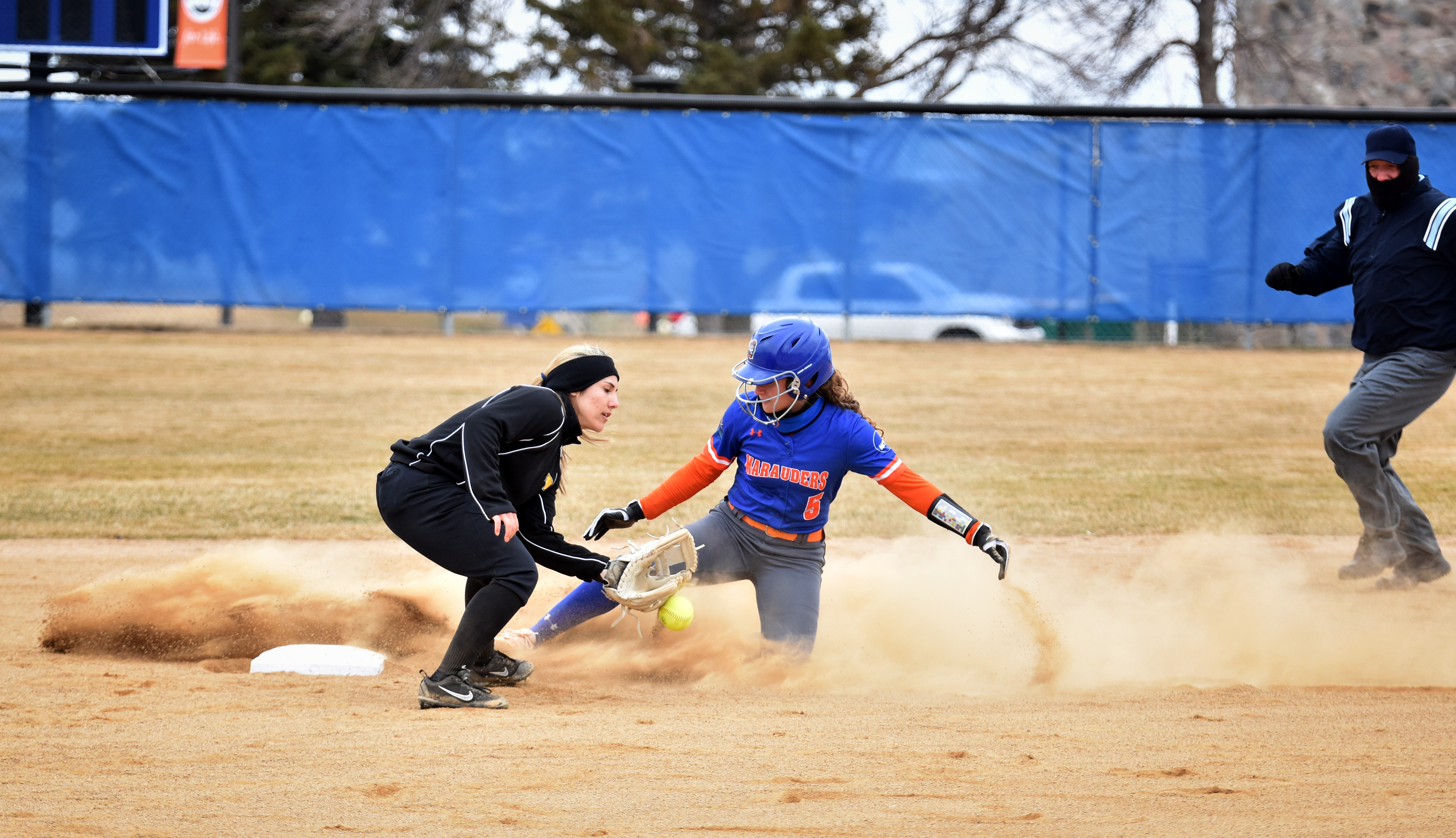
Marauders Softball sliding safe into base

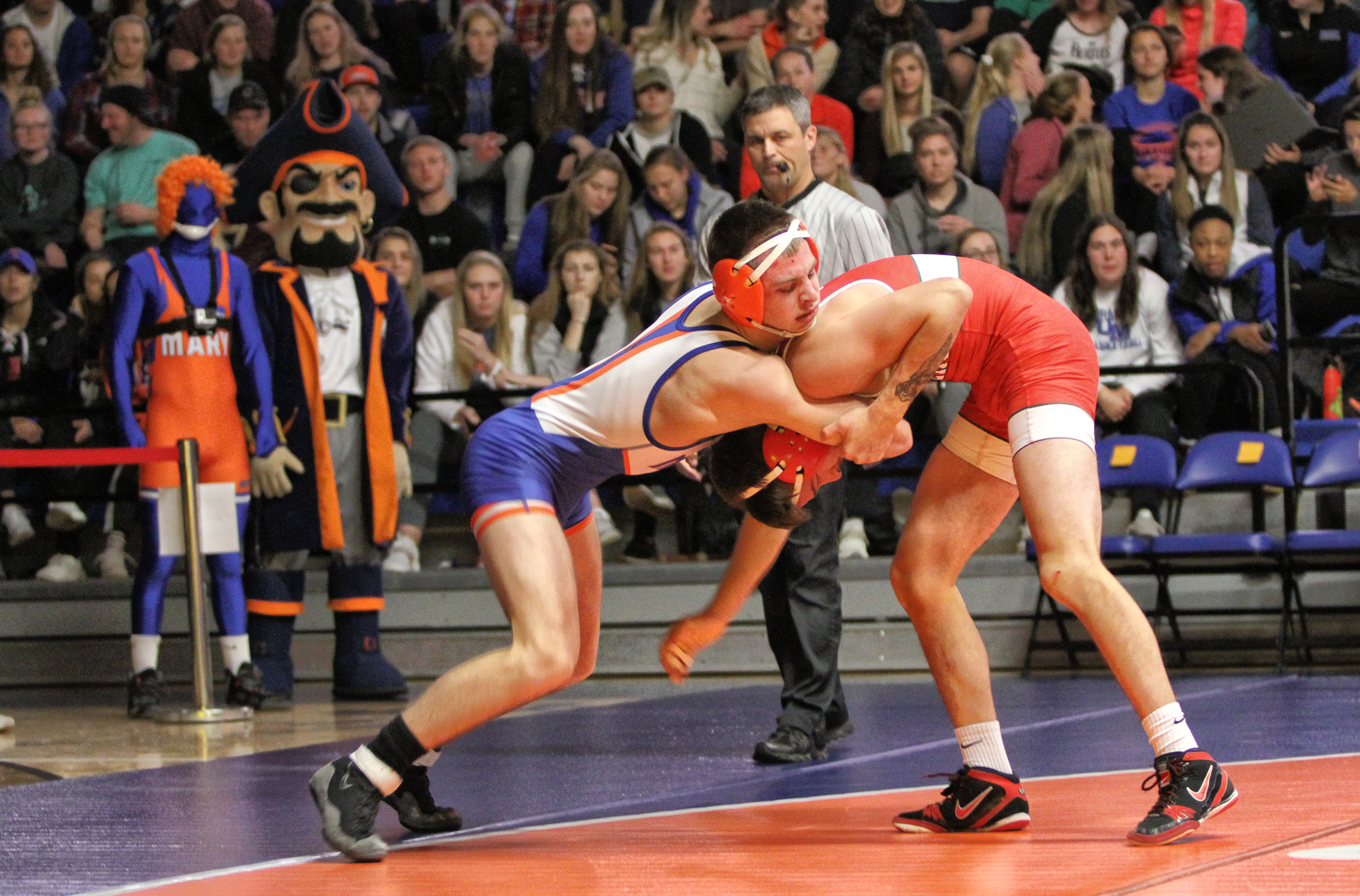
UMary wrestling against a rival school in the Marauders Activity Center

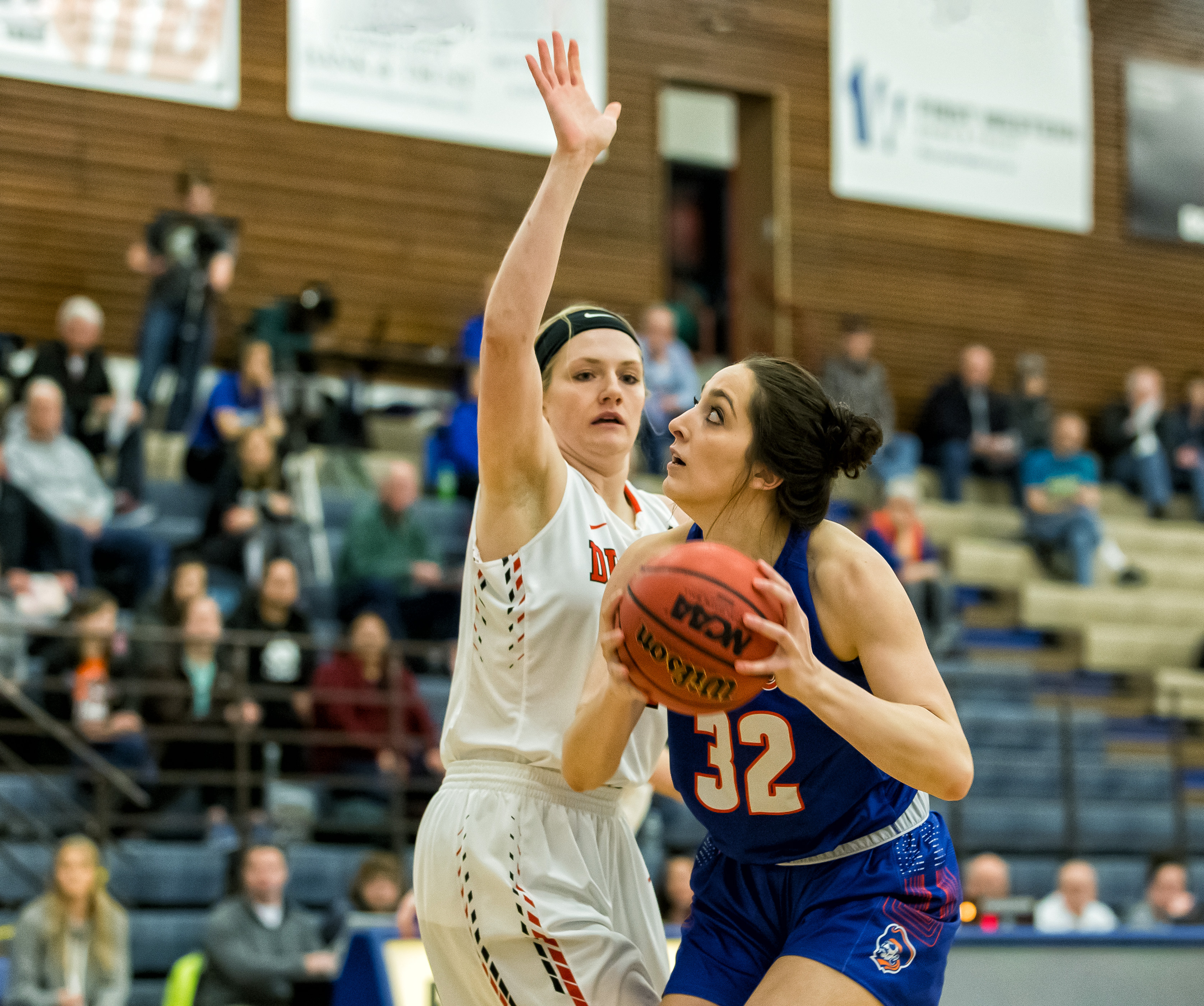
Marauders Women's Basketball sets up for a shot down low

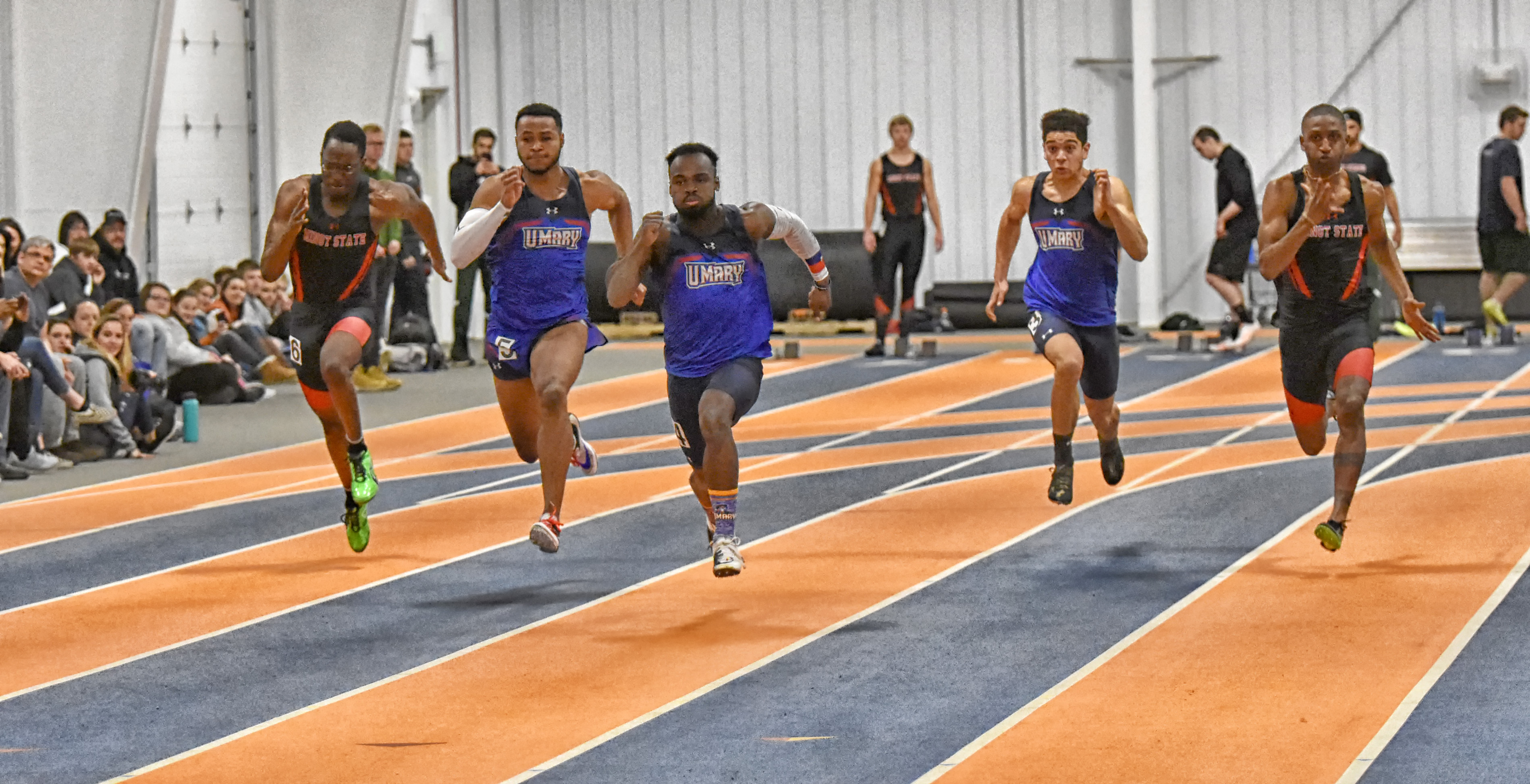
UMary Men's Track and Field in the UMary Fieldhouse

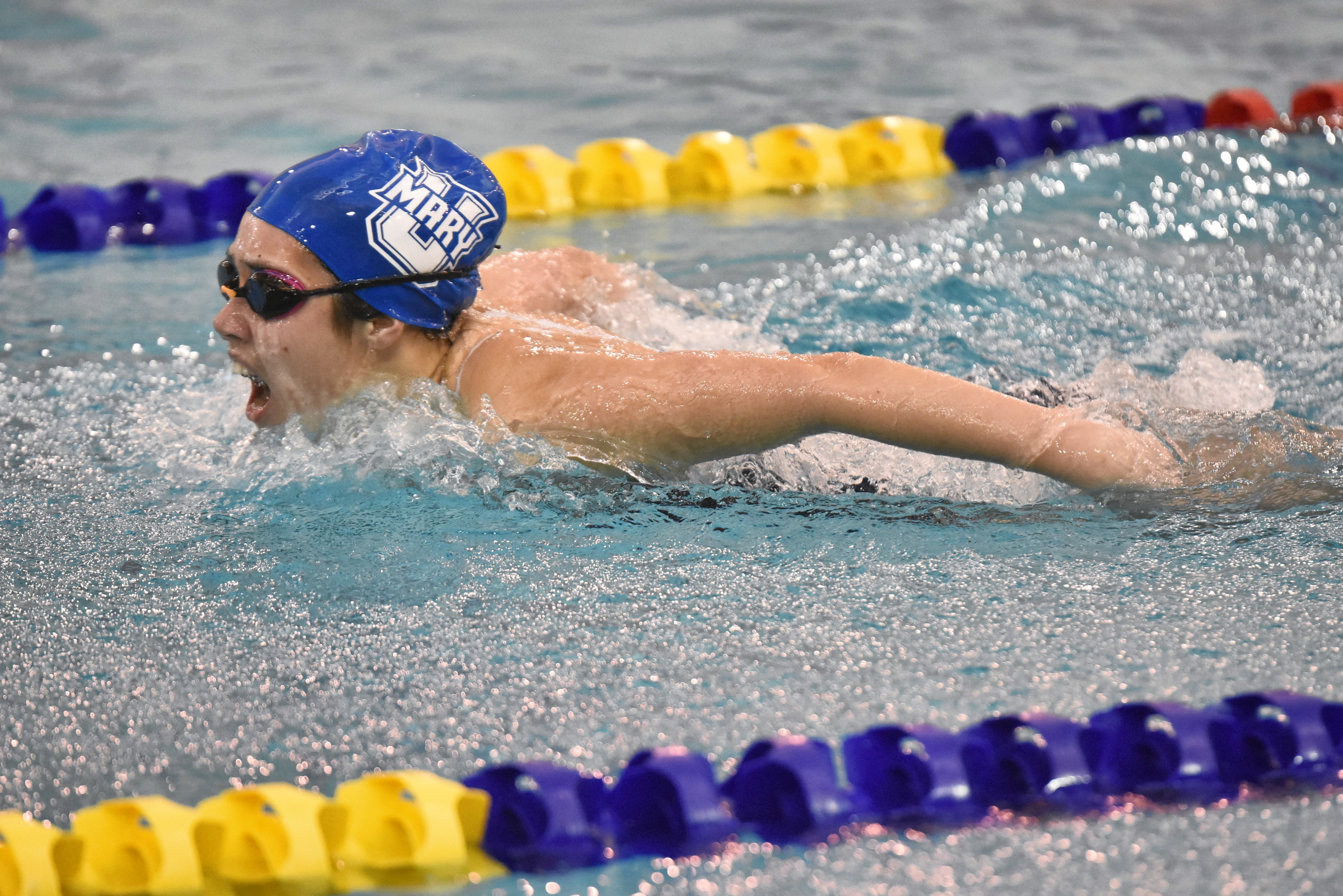
Marauders Women's Swimming competition
