= List of Lindenwood Lions football seasons =

This is a list of Lindenwood Lions football season records. The Lindenwood Lions football team is the football team of Lindenwood University, located in the American city of St. Charles, Missouri. The team competes as a OVC–Big South Football Association at the NCAA Division II level.

Since 1990, the Lindenwood's football team has played in Harlen C. Hunter Stadium.

Year	Coach	Overall	Conference	Standing	Bowl/playoffs	Rank^{#}
David Schroeder (NAIA Independent) (1990–1991)
1990	David Schroeder	6–4–0				
1991	David Schroeder	5–4–1				
Jeff Driskill (NAIA Independent) (1992–1993)
1992	Jeff Driskill	1–9–0				
1993	Jeff Driskill	2–8–1				
Jeff Driskill (Mid-States Football Association) (1994)
1994	Jeff Driskill	2–8–0	0–5–0	6th		
Dan Kratzer (Mid-States Football Association) (1995)
1995	Dan Kratzer	4–7–0	2–3–0			
Dan Kratzer (Heart of America Athletic Conference) (1996–2000)
1996	Dan Kratzer	4–6	3–6			
1997	Dan Kratzer	4–6	4–5			
1998	Dan Kratzer	8–3	7–2		NAIA 1st round	16
1999	Dan Kratzer	5–5	5–4			
2000	Dan Kratzer	4–8	4–5			
Rick Gorzynski (Heart of America Athletic Conference) (2001–2003)
2001	Rick Gorzynski	3–8	3–7			
2002	Rick Gorzynski	1–11	1–10	10th		
2003	Rick Gorzynski	3–8	2–8			
Patrick Ross (Heart of America Athletic Conference) (2004–2010)
2004	Patrick Ross	11–1	10–0	1st	NAIA 1st round	
2005	Patrick Ross	7–4	7–3	4th		
2006	Patrick Ross	5–7	5–4	6th		
2007	Patrick Ross	10–2	9–1	1st	NAIA 1st round	9
2008	Patrick Ross	11–2	9–1	2nd	NAIA Semifinal	3
2009	Patrick Ross	13–1	10–0	1st	NAIA Championship	2
2010	Patrick Ross	9–2	9–1	2nd	NAIA FCS 1st round	9
Patrick Ross (NCAA Division II Independent) (2011)
2011	Patrick Ross	8–3				
Patrick Ross (Mid-America Intercollegiate Athletics Association) (2012–2016)
2012	Patrick Ross	8–4	7–3	4th	L 17–41 Mineral Water Bowl	
2013	Patrick Ross	3–6	2–6			
2014	Patrick Ross	2–9	2–9			
2015	Patrick Ross	3–8	3–8	T–9th		
2016	Patrick Ross	4–7	4–7	T–8th		
Jed Stugart (Mid-America Intercollegiate Athletics Association) (2017–2018)
2017	Jed Stugart	4–7	4–7	T–8th		
2018	Jed Stugart	4–7	4–7	10th		
Jed Stugart (Great Lakes Valley Conference) (2019–2021)
2019	Jed Stugart	9–4	7–0	1st	NCAA Division II Second Round	25
2020–21	No team–COVID-19					
2021	Jed Stugart	9–3	7–0	1st	NCAA Division II First Round	
Jed Stugart (Ohio Valley Conference) (2022)
2022	Jed Stugart	7–3	2–3	T–3rd		
Jed Stugart (OVC–Big South Football Association) (2022–present)
2023	Jed Stugart	3–7	1–5	10th		
2024	Jed Stugart	5–7	4–4	5th		
2025	Jed Stugart	6–6	5–3	T–3rd		
Total:		198–199–2				
National championship Conference title Conference division title or championship game berth
^{†}Indicates Bowl Coalition, Bowl Alliance, BCS, or CFP / New Years' Six bowl.; ^{#}Rankings from final Coaches Poll.
