= List of Lindenwood Lions head football coaches =

The Lindenwood Lions football program is a college football team that represents Lindenwood University. The team has had 6 head coaches since organized football began in 1990. Two coaches have led the Lions to postseason bowl games: Dan Kratzer and, Patrick Ross. Ross is the only coach to have won a conference championship with the Lions, he has won three. Ross, has also won a postseason game with the Lions. Ross is the all-time leader in games coached and years coached, in wins, and winning percentage. Jeff Driskill is, in terms of winning percentage, the least successful coach the Lions have had as he has a .177 winning percentage.

== Key ==
Key to symbols in coaches list
General		Overall		Conference		Postseason (Note: Although the first Rose Bowl Game was played in 1902, it has been continuously played since the 1916 game, and is recognized as the oldest bowl game by the NCAA. "—" indicates any season prior to 1916 when postseason games were not played.)	
No.	Order of coaches (Note: A running total of the number of head coaches, with coaches who served separate tenures being counted only once. Interim head coaches are represented with "Int" and are not counted in the running total. "—" indicates the team played but either without a coach or no coach is on record. "X" indicates an interim year without play.)	GC	Games coached	CW	Conference wins	PW	Postseason wins
DC	Division championships	OW	Overall wins	CL	Conference losses	PL	Postseason losses
CC	Conference championships	OL	Overall losses	CT	Conference ties	PT	Postseason ties
NC	National championships	OT	Overall ties (Note: Overtime rules in college football were introduced in 1996, making ties impossible in the period since.)	C%	Conference winning percentage		
†	Elected to the College Football Hall of Fame	O%	Overall winning percentage (Note: When computing the win–loss percentage, a tie counts as half a win and half a loss.)				

== Coaches ==
Statistics correct as of the end of the 2024 NCAA Division I FCS football season

#	Name	Term	GC	OW	OL	OT	O%	CW	CL	CT	C%	PW	PL	PT	CCs	NCs	National awards
1	David Schroeder	1990–1991	20	11	8	1	.575	—	—	—	—	—	—	—	—	—	—
2	Jeff Driskill	1992–1994	31	5	25	1	.177	0	5	—	.000	—	—	—	—	—	—
3	Dan Kratzer	1995–2000	64	29	35	0	.453	25	25	—	.500	0	1	—	—	—	—
4	Rick Gorzynski	2001–2003	33	7	26	0	.212	6	25	—	.194	—	—	—	—	—	—
5	Patrick Ross	2004–2016	150	93	57	0	.620	76	45	—	.628	5	5	—	3	—	—
6	Jed Stugart	2017–present	83	44	39	0	.530	32	27	—	.542	1	2	—	2	—	—
