= List of Lindenwood Lions in the NFL draft =

This is a list of Lindenwood Lions players in the NFL draft.

== Key ==
B	Back	K	Kicker	NT	Nose tackle
C	Center	LB	Linebacker	FB	Fullback
DB	Defensive back	P	Punter	HB	Halfback
DE	Defensive end	QB	Quarterback	WR	Wide receiver
DT	Defensive tackle	RB	Running back	G	Guard
E	End	T	Offensive tackle	TE	Tight end

= Pro Bowler
= Hall of Famer

== Selections ==
Year	Round	Pick	Player	Team	Position
2014	4	127	Pierre Desir	Cleveland Browns	DB

== Notable undrafted players ==
Note: No drafts held before 1936

Debut year	Player name	Position	Debut NFL/AFL team	Notes
2006	DeDe Dorsey	RB	Cincinnati Bengals	—
2008	Brian Schaefering	DE	Cleveland Browns	—
2017	Connor Harris	ILB	New York Jets	—
2019	Jonathan Harris	DT	Chicago Bears	—
