= Paul Raymond =

Paul Raymond may refer to:

- Paul Raymond (archivist) (1833–1878), French archivist and historian
- Paul Raymond (ice hockey) (1913–1995), Canadian ice hockey player
- Paul Raymond (publisher) (1925–2008), British magazine publisher and owner of the Raymond Revuebar club in Soho, London
  - Paul Raymond Publications
- Paul Raymond (musician) (1945–2019), English keyboardist/guitarist
- Paul Raymond (American football) (born 1986), American football wide receiver
