= 2022 Southeast Missouri State Redhawks football team =

American college football season

2022 Southeast Missouri State Redhawks football

OVC co-champion

NCAA Division I First Round, L 24–34 vs. Montana
- Conference: Ohio Valley Conference

Ranking
- STATS: No. 15
- FCS Coaches: No. 13
- Record: 9–3 (5–0 OVC)
- Head coach: Tom Matukewicz (9th season)
- Offensive coordinator: Jeromy McDowell (5th season)
- Defensive coordinator: Ricky Coon (1st season)
- Home stadium: Houck Stadium

2022 Ohio Valley Conference football standings
	Conf.			Overall
Team	W		L	W		L
No. 15 Southeast Missouri State +^	5	–	0	9	–	3
UT Martin +	5	–	0	7	–	4
Tennessee State	2	–	3	4	–	7
Tennessee Tech	2	–	3	4	–	7
Lindenwood *	2	–	3	7	–	3
Eastern Illinois	1	–	4	2	–	9
Murray State	1	–	4	2	–	9
+ – Conference co-champions; ^ – FCS playoff participant; Note: Lindenwood ineligible for OVC title and FCS postseason play due to transition from NCAA Division II.; Rankings from STATS Poll

The 2022 Southeast Missouri State Redhawks football team represented Southeast Missouri State University (SEMO) as a member of the Ohio Valley Conference (OVC) during the 2022 NCAA Division I FCS football season. Led by ninth-year head coach Tom Matukewicz, the Redhawks played their home games at Houck Stadium in Cape Girardeau, Missouri.

Although Southeast Missouri State finished as OVC co-champions with UT Martin (both with 5–0 OVC records), SEMO was awarded the automatic bid to the 2022 FCS playoffs while UT Martin was not. Both teams had identical records in conference play, and no game had been played between the two teams that season, as a result of schedule changes to accommodate new member Lindenwood. The tiebreaker to determine an automatic conference bid ultimately then came down to a coin flip, which the Redhawks won.

== Schedule ==
Date	Time	Opponent	Rank	Site	TV	Result	Attendance
September 3	1:00 p.m.	at Iowa State*		Jack Trice Stadium; Ames, IA	ESPN+	L 10–42	57,142
September 10	6:00 p.m.	at No. 17 Southern Illinois*		Saluki Stadium; Carbondale, IL	ESPN3/ESPN+	W 34–31	8,662
September 17	2:00 p.m.	Nicholls*		Houck Stadium; Cape Girardeau, MO	ESPN+	W 42–16	3,482
September 24	2:00 p.m.	Central Arkansas*		Houck Stadium; Cape Girardeau, MO	ESPN+	W 35–27	3,756
October 1	1:00 p.m.	at Lindenwood	No. 24	Harlen C. Hunter Stadium; St. Charles, MO	ESPN+	W 49–28	5,036
October 8	2:00 p.m.	Tennessee Tech	No. 21	Houck Stadium; Cape Girardeau, MO	ESPN+	W 34–20	3,892
October 22	1:00 p.m.	at Northwestern State*	No. 16	Harry Turpin Stadium; Natchitoches, LA	ESPN+	W 51–16	4,326
October 29	1:00 p.m.	Eastern Kentucky*^{†}	No. 15	Houck Stadium; Cape Girardeau, MO	ESPN+	L 23–28	4,902
November 5	5:00 p.m.	at Tennessee State	No. 22	Hale Stadium; Nashville, TN	ESPN+	W 42–0	6,369
November 12	2:00 p.m.	at Eastern Illinois	No. 20	O'Brien Field; Charleston, IL	ESPN+	W 31–7	1,831
November 19	1:00 p.m.	Murray State	No. 17	Houck Stadium; Cape Girardeau, MO	ESPN+	W 52–22	3,375
November 26	9:00 p.m.	at No. 19 Montana*	No. 14	Washington–Grizzly Stadium; Missoula, MT (NCAA Division I First Round)	ESPN2/ESPN+	L 24–34	13,390
*Non-conference game; ^{†}Homecoming; Rankings from STATS Poll released prior to the game; All times are in Central time

== Game summaries ==
=== At Iowa State ===
Game One: Southeast Missouri State Redhawks (0–0) vs. Iowa State Cyclones (0–0) - Game summary

Quarter	1	2	3	4	Total
Southeast Missouri State	0	10	0	0	10
Iowa State	7	14	7	14	42

at Jack Trice Stadium • Ames, IA

- Date: Saturday, September 3, 2022
- Game time: 1:00 p.m. CDT
- Game weather: sunny • Temperature: 74°F
- Game attendance: 57,142
- Referee: Derek Anderson
- TV announcers (ESPN+): Shawn Kenney, Todd Doxzon

Game information

First Quarter

- (02:29) ISU – Xavier Hutchinson 33 Yd pass from Hunter Dekkers (Jace Gilbert Kick) (Drive: 8 plays, 85 yards, 4:05; ISU 7–0)

Second Quarter

- (14:53) ISU – Xavier Hutchinson 33 Yd pass from Hunter Dekkers (Jace Gilbert Kick) (Drive: 6 plays, 75 yards, 1:03; ISU 14–0)
- (07:54) ISU – Xavier Hutchinson 8 Yd pass from Hunter Dekkers (Jace Gilbert Kick) (Drive: 11 plays, 90 yards, 4:06; ISU 21–0)
- (01:59) SEMO– Damoriea Vick 11 Yd pass from Paxton DeLaurent (DC Pippin Kick) (Drive: 11 plays, 90 yards, 4:06; ISU 21–7)
- (00:28) SEMO – DC Pippin 23 Yd Field Goal (Drive: 4 plays, 2 yards, 0:58; ISU 21–10)

Third Quarter

- (09:58) ISU – DeShawn Hanika 9 Yd pass from Hunter Dekkers (Jace Gilbert Kick) (Drive: 9 plays, 80 yards, 4:57; ISU 28–10)

Fourth Quarter

- (13:29) ISU – Jirehl Brock 1 Yd Run (Jace Gilbert Kick) (Drive: 10 plays, 84 yards, 4:27; ISU 35–10)
- (06:06) ISU – Deon Silas 1 Yd Run (Jace Gilbert Kick) (Drive: 11 plays, 77 yards, 6:29; ISU 42–10)

Statistics	SEMO	ISU
First downs	15	26
Total yards	320	469
Rushes/yards	22/98	36/176
Passing yards	222	293
Passing: Comp–Att–Int	19–38–1	25–31–1
Turnovers	1	1
Time of possession	27:25	32:35

Team	Category	Player	Statistics
SEMO	Passing	Paxton DeLaurent	19–38, 222 YDS, 1 TD, 1 INT
SEMO	Rushing	Paxton DeLaurent	12 CAR, 74 YDS
SEMO	Receiving	Ryan Flournoy	3 REC, 56 YDS, 0 TD
Iowa State	Passing	Hunter Dekkers	25–31, 293 yards, 4TD, 1 INT
Iowa State	Rushing	Jirehl Brock	16 CAR, 104 YDS, 1 TD
Iowa State	Receiving	Xavier Hutchinson	8 REC, 128 YDS, 3 TD

=== At No. 17 Southern Illinois ===
	1	2	3	4	Total
Redhawks	7	7	3	17	34
No. 17 Salukis	3	7	7	14	31

=== Nicholls ===
	1	2	3	4	Total
Colonels	0	7	9	0	16
Redhawks	7	14	14	7	42

=== Central Arkansas ===
	1	2	3	4	Total
Bears	0	17	3	7	27
Redhawks	7	21	0	7	35

=== At Lindenwood ===
	1	2	3	4	Total
No. 24 Redhawks	6	15	7	21	49
Lions	0	7	7	14	28

=== Tennessee Tech ===
	1	2	3	4	Total
Golden Eagles	3	10	0	7	20
No. 21 Redhawks	10	17	7	0	34

=== At Northwestern State ===
	1	2	3	4	Total
No. 16 Redhawks	23	14	14	0	51
Demons	3	0	13	0	16

=== Eastern Kentucky ===
	1	2	3	4	Total
Colonels	0	0	22	6	28
No. 15 Redhawks	10	3	3	7	23

=== At Tennessee State ===
	1	2	3	4	Total
No. 22 Redhawks	7	14	7	14	42
Tigers	0	0	0	0	0

=== At Eastern Illinois ===
	1	2	3	4	Total
No. 20 Redhawks	0	21	3	7	31
Panthers	0	7	0	0	7

=== Murray State ===
	1	2	3	4	Total
Racers	3	6	6	7	22
No. 17 Redhawks	21	10	14	7	52

=== At No. 19 Montana—NCAA Division I First Round ===
	1	2	3	4	Total
No. 14 Redhawks	7	10	7	0	24
No. 19 Grizzlies	0	3	21	10	34

== Coaching staff ==
Southeast Missouri State Redhawks
Name	Position	Consecutive season at Southeast Missouri State in current position	Previous position
Tom Matukewicz	Head coach	9th	Toledo defensive coordinator (2012–2013)
Jeromy McDowell	Offensive coordinator and quarterbacks coach	5th	Colorado Mesa offensive coordinator (2016–2017)
Ricky Coon	Defensive coordinator	1st	Dodge City CC head coach (2019–2021)
Ray Smith	Defensive pass game coordinator	2nd	Southeast Missouri State cornerbacks coach (2017–2020)
Justin Drudik	Offensive pass game coordinator and wide receivers coach	2nd	Southeast Missouri State wide receivers coach (2018–2020)
Jerone Steckel	Defensive line coach	4th	Central Michigan graduate assistant (2017–2018)
Lucas Orchard	Offensive line coach	1st	Southeast Missouri State graduate assistant (2020–2021)
Tim Billings	Outside linebackers coach	1st	Southern Miss interim head coach, assistant head coach, defensive coordinator, and safeties coach (2020)
Cole Cook	Tight ends coach	1st	Missouri offensive analyst (2020–2021)
Connor Benado	Special teams coordinator and inside linebackers coach	1st	Southeast Missouri State inside linebackers coach (2021)
Darius Hicks	Assistant defensive backs coach and cornerbacks coach	1st	Morningside defensive backs coach (2020–2021)
