= 2022 UT Martin Skyhawks football team =

American college football season

2022 UT Martin Skyhawks football

OVC co-champion
- Conference: Ohio Valley Conference
- Record: 7–4 (5–0 OVC)
- Head coach: Jason Simpson (17th season)
- Offensive coordinator: Kevin Bannon (7th season)
- Offensive scheme: Multiple
- Defensive coordinator: Chris Polizzi (3rd season)
- Base defense: 4–2–5
- Home stadium: Graham Stadium

2022 Ohio Valley Conference football standings
	Conf.			Overall
Team	W		L	W		L
No. 15 Southeast Missouri State +^	5	–	0	9	–	3
UT Martin +	5	–	0	7	–	4
Tennessee State	2	–	3	4	–	7
Tennessee Tech	2	–	3	4	–	7
Lindenwood *	2	–	3	7	–	3
Eastern Illinois	1	–	4	2	–	9
Murray State	1	–	4	2	–	9
+ – Conference co-champions; ^ – FCS playoff participant; Note: Lindenwood ineligible for OVC title and FCS postseason play due to transition from NCAA Division II.; Rankings from STATS Poll

The 2022 UT Martin Skyhawks football team represented University of Tennessee at Martin as a member of the Ohio Valley Conference (OVC) during the 2022 NCAA Division I FCS football season. They were led by 17th-year head coach Jason Simpson and played their games at Graham Stadium in Martin, Tennessee.

Although UT Martin finished as OVC co-champions with Southeast Missouri State (both with 5–0 OVC records), Southeast Missouri State was awarded the automatic bid to the 2022 FCS playoffs while UT Martin was not. Both teams had identical records in conference play, and no game had been played between the two teams that season, as a result of schedule changes to accommodate new member Lindenwood. The tiebreaker to determine an automatic conference bid ultimately then came down to a coin flip, which UT Martin lost.

== Schedule ==
Date	Time	Opponent	Rank	Site	TV	Result	Attendance
September 1	7:30 p.m.	Western Illinois*	No. 18	Graham Stadium; Martin, TN	ESPN+	W 42–25	5,127
September 8	8:00 p.m.	at No. 5 Missouri State*	No. 14	Robert W. Plaster Stadium; Springfield, MO	ESPN+	L 30–35	9,872
September 17	4:00 p.m.	at Boise State*	No. 16	Albertsons Stadium; Boise, ID	FS1	L 7–30	36,396
September 24	7:00 p.m.	Lindenwood	No. 18	Graham Stadium; Martin, TN	ESPN+	W 56–26	4,414
October 1	3:00 p.m.	Tennessee Tech^{†}	No. 15	Graham Stadium; Martin, TN (Sgt. York Trophy)	ESPN+	W 45–28	6,412
October 8	3:00 p.m.	at Murray State	No. 18	Roy Stewart Stadium; Murray, KY	ESPN+	W 45–16	6,492
October 22	3:00 p.m.	at No. 3 (FBS) Tennessee*	No. 18	Neyland Stadium; Knoxville, TN	SECN	L 24–65	101,915
October 29	3:00 p.m.	at Houston Christian	No. 21	Husky Stadium; Houston, TX	ESPN+	W 52–28	1,137
November 5	1:00 p.m.	Kennesaw State*	No. 20	Graham Stadium; Martin, TN	ESPN+	L 27–44	3,408
November 12	4:00 p.m.	at Tennessee State		Nissan Stadium; Nashville, TN (Sgt. York Trophy)	ESPN+	W 20–3	2,665
November 19	3:00 p.m.	Eastern Illinois	No. 25	Graham Stadium; Martin, TN	ESPN+	W 34–31	3,003
*Non-conference game; ^{†}Homecoming; Rankings from STATS Poll released prior to the game; All times are in Eastern time

== Roster ==
2022 UT Martin Skyhawks football team roster
Players
Coaches
Offense

Pos.	#	Name	Class
QB	3	Dresser Winn	Sr
WR	9	E. J. Smoot	Jr
WR	15	Colton Dowell	GS
WR	17	Ajay Smith	Jr

Defense

Pos.	#	Name	Class
S	12	Carson Evans	So
CB	14	Tyler Gore	GS
LB	16	Jaylon Sharpe	So
DT	93	Jarid Johnson	Jr
NT	94	Christian Dowell	So
NT	96	Myles Saulsberry	Fr
DT	97	Toby Camp	Fr

Special teams

Pos.	#	Name	Class
LS	40	Brock Powers	Sr
LS	44	Brett Kuczynski	Fr
P	47	Jackson Abel	Fr

Head coach

- Jason Simpson

Coordinators/assistant coaches

- Travis Partridge (Pass game coordinator / quarterbacks)

Legend

- (C) Team captain
- (S) Suspended
- (I) Ineligible
- Injured
- Redshirt

Roster
