= David Schroeder =

David Schroeder or Schröder may refer to:

- David Schroeder (American football) (born 1937), American football coach
- David Schröder (born 1985), German slalom canoer
- David E. Schroeder, president of Pillar College
