= 2009 NAIA football rankings =

Legend
	Increase in ranking
	Decrease in ranking
	Not ranked previous week
*	NAIA National Champion
т	Tied with team above or below also with this symbol

One human poll made up the 2009 National Association of Intercollegiate Athletics (NAIA) football rankings, sometimes called the NAIA Coaches' Poll or the football ratings. Once the regular season was complete, the NAIA sponsored a 16-team playoff to determine the year's national champion. A final poll was then taken after completion of the 2009 NAIA Football National Championship.

== Poll release dates ==
The poll release dates were:

- April 20, 2009 (Spring)
- August 10, 2009 (Preseason)
- September 14, 2009
- September 21, 2009
- September 28, 2009
- October 5, 2009
- October 12, 2009
- October 19, 2009
- October 26, 2009
- November 2, 2009
- November 9, 2009
- November 15, 2009 (Final)
- January 11, 2010 (Postseason)

== Week by week poll ==
	Week 0-Spring Apr 20	Week 0-Preseason Aug 10	Week Poll 1 Sep 14	Week Poll 2 Sep 21	Week Poll 3 Sep 28	Week Poll 4 Oct 05	Week Poll 5 Oct 12	Week Poll 6 Oct 19	Week Poll 7 Oct 26	Week Poll 8 Nov 02	Week Poll 9 Nov 09	Week Final Nov 15	Week Postseason Jan 11	
1.	Sioux Falls (SD)	Sioux Falls (SD)	Sioux Falls (SD)	Sioux Falls (SD)	Sioux Falls (SD)	Sioux Falls (SD)	Sioux Falls (SD)	Sioux Falls (SD)	Sioux Falls (SD)	Sioux Falls (SD)	Sioux Falls (SD)	Sioux Falls (SD)	*Sioux Falls (SD)	1.
2.	Carroll (MT)	Carroll (MT)	Carroll (MT)	Carroll (MT)	Carroll (MT)	Carroll (MT)	Carroll (MT)	Carroll (MT)	Carroll (MT)	Carroll (MT)	Carroll (MT)	Carroll (MT)	Lindenwood (MO)	2.
3.	Lindenwood (MO)	Lindenwood (MO)	Lindenwood (MO)	Lindenwood (MO)	Lindenwood (MO)	Lindenwood (MO)	Lindenwood (MO)	Lindenwood (MO)	Lindenwood (MO)	Lindenwood (MO)	Lindenwood (MO)	Lindenwood (MO)	Carroll (MT)	3.
4.	Saint Francis (IN)	Saint Francis (IN)	Saint Francis (IN)	Saint Francis (IN)	Saint Francis (IN)	Saint Francis (IN)	Saint Francis (IN)	Saint Francis (IN)	Morningside (IA)	Morningside (IA)	Morningside (IA)	Saint Xavier (IL)	Saint Xavier (IL)	4.
5.	Morningside (IA)	Morningside (IA)	Morningside (IA)	Morningside (IA)	Morningside (IA)	Morningside (IA)	Morningside (IA)	Morningside (IA)	Lambuth (TN)	Lambuth (TN)	Saint Xavier (IL)	Ottawa (KS)	Morningside (IA)	5.
6.	Cumberlands (KY)	Cumberlands (KY)	Cumberlands (KY)	Cumberlands (KY)	Cumberlands (KY)	Cumberlands (KY)	Cumberlands (KY)	Lambuth (TN)	Saint Xavier (IL)	Saint Xavier (IL)	Ottawa (KS)	Lambuth (TN)	Ottawa (KS)	6.
7.	Langston (OK)	Langston (OK)	MidAmerica Nazarene (KS)	MidAmerica Nazarene (KS)	Lambuth (TN)	Lambuth (TN)	Lambuth (TN)	Saint Xavier (IL)	Ottawa (KS)	Ottawa (KS)	Lambuth (TN)	Morningside (IA)	Lambuth (TN)	7.
8.	MidAmerica Nazarene (KS)	MidAmerica Nazarene (KS)	Langston (OK)	Langston (OK)	Langston (OK)	Langston (OK)	Saint Xavier (IL)	Ottawa (KS)	Saint Francis (IN)	Saint Francis (IN)	MidAmerica Nazarene (KS)	MidAmerica Nazarene (KS)	MidAmerica Nazarene (KS)	8.
9.	Union (KY)	Friends (KS)	St. Ambrose (IA)	Lambuth (TN)	Saint Xavier (IL)	Saint Xavier (IL)	Ottawa (KS)	Missouri Valley	Missouri Valley	Missouri Valley	McKendree (IL)	McKendree (IL)	McKendree (IL)	9.
10.	Friends (KS)	Union (KY)	(T) Union (KY)	Union (KY)	Shorter (GA)	Ottawa (KS)	Missouri Valley	MidAmerica Nazarene (KS)	MidAmerica Nazarene (KS)	MidAmerica Nazarene (KS)	Cumberlands (KY)	Cumberlands (KY)	Missouri Valley	10.
11.	Shorter (GA)	Shorter (GA)	(T) Lambuth (TN)	Shorter (GA)	Ottawa (KS)	Missouri Valley	MidAmerica Nazarene (KS)	McKendree (IL)	McKendree (IL)	McKendree (IL)	Saint Francis (IN)	Missouri Valley	Cumberlands (KY)	11.
12.	Baker (KS)	Baker (KS)	Shorter (GA)	Saint Xavier (IL)	Missouri Valley	MidAmerica Nazarene (KS)	McKendree (IL)	Northwestern (IA)	(T) Northwestern (IA)	Cumberlands (KY)	Missouri Valley	McPherson (KS)	McPherson (KS)	12.
13.	St. Ambrose (IA)	St. Ambrose (IA)	Missouri Valley	Ottawa (KS)	MidAmerica Nazarene (KS)	McKendree (IL)	Northwestern (IA)	Cumberlands (KY)	(T) Cumberlands (KY)	Langston (OK)	Friends (KS)	Hastings (NB)	Hastings (NB)	13.
14.	Dickinson State (SD)	Lambuth (TN)	Saint Xavier (IL)	St. Ambrose (IA)	McKendree (IL)	Northwestern (IA)	Friends (KS)	Friends (KS)	(T) Friends (KS)	Friends (KS)	Langston (OK)	Minot State (ND)	Minot State (ND)	14.
15.	Lambuth (TN)	Dickinson State (SD)	Ottawa (KS)	Missouri Valley	Northwestern (IA)	Friends (KS)	Langston (OK)	Langston (OK)	(T) Langston (OK)	McPherson (KS)	McPherson (KS)	Friends (KS)	Friends (KS)	15.
16.	Missouri Valley	Missouri Valley	Montana State-Northern	McKendree (IL)	Friends (KS)	Hastings (NB)	McPherson (KS)	Minot State (ND)	McPherson (KS)	Dickinson State (SD)	Hastings (NB)	Walsh (OH)	Walsh (OH)	16.
17.	Virginia-Wise	Saint Xavier (IL)	Benedictine (KS)	Friends (KS)	Hastings (NB)	Union (KY)	Minot State (ND)	McPherson (KS)	Minot State (ND)	Hastings (NB)	Grand View (IA)	Dickinson State (SD)	Saint Francis (IN)	17.
18.	Saint Xavier (IL)	Montana State-Northern	Friends (KS)	Northwestern (IA)	Union (KY)	McPherson (KS)	St. Ambrose (IA)	Eastern Oregon	Walsh (OH)	Northwestern (IA)	Minot State (ND)	Saint Francis (IN)	Dickinson State (SD)	18.
19.	(T) Northwestern (IA)	Dakota Wesleyan (SD)	Hastings (NB)	Hastings (NB)	Eastern Oregon	Shorter (GA)	Eastern Oregon	Georgetown (KY)	Hastings (NB)	Grand View (IA)	Ohio Dominican	Taylor (IN)	Langston (OK)	19.
20.	(T) Ohio Dominican	Ohio Dominican	Ohio Dominican	McPherson (KS)	McPherson (KS)	Walsh (OH)	Central Methodist (MO)	Walsh (OH)	Dickinson State (SD)	Ohio Dominican	Dickinson State (SD)	Langston (OK)	Taylor (IN)	20.
21.	Montana State-Northern	Virginia-Wise	McPherson (KS)	Malone (OH)	Georgetown (KY)	(T) St. Ambrose (IA)	Walsh (OH)	Hastings (NB)	Ohio Dominican	Minot State (ND)	Walsh (OH)	Grand View (IA)	Grand View (IA)	21.
22.	Ottawa (KS)	Ottawa (KS)	(T) Northwestern (IA)	Sterling (KS)	St. Ambrose (IA)	(T) Minot State (ND)	Hastings (NB)	Dickinson State (SD)	Grand View (IA)	Eastern Oregon	Eastern Oregon	Eastern Oregon	Eastern Oregon	22.
23.	Dakota Wesleyan (SD)	Northwestern (IA)	(T) McKendree (IL)	Eastern Oregon	Malone (OH)	Black Hills State (SD)	Ohio Dominican	Ohio Dominican	Eastern Oregon	Walsh (OH)	Northwestern (IA)	Baker (KS)	Baker (KS)	23.
24.	Jamestown (ND)	Jamestown (ND)	Malone (OH)	(T)Minot State (ND)	Walsh (OH)	Eastern Oregon	Dickinson State (SD)	Central Methodist (MO)	Campbellsville (KY)	Georgetown (KY)	Baker (KS)	Ohio Dominican	Ohio Dominican	24.
25.	Malone (OH)	Malone (OH)	Nebraska Wesleyan	(T) Walsh (OH)	Minot State (ND)	(T) Bethany (KS); (T) Central Methodist (MO)	Georgetown (KY)	Grand View (IA)	Shorter (GA)	St. Ambrose (IA)	Taylor (IN)	Northwestern (IA)	Northwestern (IA)	25.
	Week 0-Spring Apr 20	Week 0-Preseason Aug 10	Week Poll 1 Sep 14	Week Poll 2 Sep 21	Week Poll 3 Sep 28	Week Poll 4 Oct 05	Week Poll 5 Oct 12	Week Poll 6 Oct 19	Week Poll 7 Oct 26	Week Poll 8 Nov 02	Week Poll 9 Nov 09	Week Final Nov 15	Week Postseason Jan 11	
		None	Dropped: Baker (KS); Dakota Wesleyan (SD); Dickinson State (SD); Jamestown (ND); Virginia-Wise	Dropped: Benedictine (KS); Montana State-Northern; Nebraska Wesleyan; Ohio Dominican	Dropped: Sterling (KS)	Dropped: Georgetown (KY); Malone (OH)	Dropped: Bethany (KS); Black Hills State (SD); Shorter (GA); Union (KY)	Dropped: St. Ambrose (IA)	Dropped: Central Methodist (MO); Georgetown (KY)	Dropped: Campbellsville (KY); Shorter (GA)	Dropped: Georgetown (KY); Shorter (GA)	None	None	

== Leading vote-getters ==
Since the inception of the Coaches' Poll in 1999, the #1 ranking in the various weekly polls has been held by only a select group of teams. Through the postseason poll of the 2009 season, the teams and the number of times they have held the #1 weekly ranking are shown below. The number of times a team has been ranked #1 in the postseason poll (the national champion) is shown in parentheses.

In 1999, the results of a postseason poll, if one was conducted, are not known. Therefore, an additional poll has been presumed, and the #1 postseason ranking has been credited to the postseason tournament champion, the Northwestern Oklahoma State Rangers.

Team	Total #1 Rankings
Carroll (MT)	53 (5)
Sioux Falls (SD)	43 (3)
Georgetown (KY)	23 (2)
Northwestern Oklahoma State	12 (1)
Azusa Pacific (CA)	3
Saint Francis (IN)	3
