= 2022 Lindenwood Lions football team =

American college football season

2022 Lindenwood Lions football
- Conference: Ohio Valley Conference
- Record: 7–3 (2–3 OVC)
- Head coach: Jed Stugart (5th season)
- Offensive coordinator: Dusty Hovorka (5th season)
- Defensive coordinator: Eric Inama (5th season)
- Home stadium: Harlen C. Hunter Stadium

2022 Ohio Valley Conference football standings
	Conf.			Overall
Team	W		L	W		L
No. 15 Southeast Missouri State +^	5	–	0	9	–	3
UT Martin +	5	–	0	7	–	4
Tennessee State	2	–	3	4	–	7
Tennessee Tech	2	–	3	4	–	7
Lindenwood *	2	–	3	7	–	3
Eastern Illinois	1	–	4	2	–	9
Murray State	1	–	4	2	–	9
+ – Conference co-champions; ^ – FCS playoff participant; Note: Lindenwood ineligible for OVC title and FCS postseason play due to transition from NCAA Division II.; Rankings from STATS Poll

The 2022 Lindenwood football team represented Lindenwood University as a first-year member of the Ohio Valley Conference (OVC) in the 2022 NCAA Division I FCS football season. The Lions, led by fifth-year head coach Jed Stugart, played their home games at Harlen C. Hunter Stadium.

Lindenwood was ineligible for OVC title and FCS postseason play due to transition from NCAA Division II.

== Schedule ==
Date	Time	Opponent	Site	TV	Result	Attendance
September 10	6:00 p.m.	at Houston Christian*	Husky Stadium; Houston, TX	ESPN3	W 21–20	2,125
September 17	6:00 p.m.	Keiser*	Harlen C. Hunter Stadium; St. Charles, MO	ESPN+	W 37–3	4,111
September 24	6:00 p.m.	at No. 18 UT Martin	Graham Stadium; Martin, TN	ESPN+	L 26–56	4,414
October 1	1:00 p.m.	No. 24 Southeast Missouri State	Harlen C. Hunter Stadium; St. Charles, MO	ESPN+	L 28–49	5,036
October 8	4:00 p.m.	at Central Arkansas*	Estes Stadium; Conway, AR	ESPN+	W 52–49	6,647
October 15	2:00 p.m.	at Eastern Illinois	O'Brien Field; Charleston, IL	ESPN+	W 37–34 ^{2OT}	6,875
October 22	1:00 p.m.	Murray State^{†}	Harlen C. Hunter Stadium; St. Charles, MO	ESPN+	W 33–18	3,851
October 29	1:00 p.m.	William Jewell*	Harlen C. Hunter Stadium; St. Charles, MO	ESPN+	W 64–23	2,872
November 5	1:30 p.m.	at Tennessee Tech	Tucker Stadium; Cookeville, TN	ESPN+	L 34–35	7,100
November 12	1:00 p.m.	McKendree*	Harlen C. Hunter Stadium; St. Charles, MO	ESPN+	W 63–35	2,777
*Non-conference game; ^{†}Homecoming; Rankings from STATS Poll released prior to the game; All times are in Central time

== Game summaries ==
=== At Houston Baptist ===
	1	2	3	4	Total
Lions	6	0	6	9	21
Huskies	7	10	3	0	20

=== Keiser ===
	1	2	3	4	Total
Hawks	3	0	0	0	3
Lions	7	21	0	9	37

=== At No. 18 UT Martin ===
	1	2	3	4	Total
Lions	7	6	0	13	26
No. 18 Skyhawks	14	7	21	14	56

=== No. 24 Southeast Missouri State ===
	1	2	3	4	Total
No. 24 Redhawks	6	15	7	21	49
Lions	0	7	7	14	28

=== At Central Arkansas ===
	1	2	3	4	Total
Lions	14	21	14	3	52
Bears	14	14	21	0	49

=== At Eastern Illinois ===
	1	2	3	4	OT	2OT	Total
Lions	0	14	0	10	7	6	37
Panthers	7	3	7	7	7	3	34

=== Murray State ===
	1	2	3	4	Total
Racers	12	3	3	0	18
Lions	0	17	7	9	33

=== William Jewell ===
	1	2	3	4	Total
Cardinals	3	20	0	0	23
Lions	20	13	7	24	64

=== At Tennessee Tech ===
	1	2	3	4	Total
Lions	0	21	7	6	34
Golden Eagles	7	7	14	7	35

=== McKendree ===
	1	2	3	4	Total
Bearcats	7	7	14	7	35
Lions	14	14	21	14	63
