= 2009 Saint Francis Cougars football team =

American college football season

2009 Saint Francis Cougars football
- Conference: Mid-States Football Association
- Mideast League
- Record: 7–3 (5–2 MSFA (MEL))
- Head coach: Kevin Donley (12th season)
- Offensive coordinator: Patrick Donley, Trevor Miller (6th, 4th season)
- Defensive coordinator: Eric Wagoner (2nd season)
- Home stadium: Bishop John M. D'Arcy Stadium

2009 Mid-States Football Association standings
	Conf.			Overall
Team	W		L	W		L
Mideast League
No. 4 Saint Xavier x^	7	–	0	13	–	1
No. 16 Walsh	5	–	2	8	–	3
No. 17 Saint Francis (IN)	5	–	2	7	–	3
No. 20 Taylor	5	–	2	7	–	3
Marian (IN)	3	–	4	6	–	5
Malone	2	–	5	4	–	6
Olivet Nazarene	1	–	6	2	–	9
Trinity International	0	–	7	0	–	11
Midwest League
No. 9 McKendree x^	7	–	0	9	–	2
No. 21 Grand View	6	–	1	8	–	3
William Penn	5	–	2	7	–	5
St. Ambrose	4	–	3	6	–	4
Quincy	3	–	4	4	–	7
St. Francis (IL)	2	–	5	3	–	8
Iowa Wesleyan	1	–	6	2	–	9
Waldorf	0	–	7	1	–	9
x – League champion/co-champions ^ – NAIA playoff participant; Rankings from NAIA Coaches' Poll

The 2009 Saint Francis Cougars football team represented the University of Saint Francis, located in Fort Wayne, Indiana, in the 2009 NAIA football season. They were led by head coach Kevin Donley, who served his 12th year as the first and only head coach in the history of Saint Francis football. The Cougars played their home games at Bishop John D'Arcy Stadium and were members of the Mid-States Football Association (MSFA) Mideast League (MEL). The Cougars finished tied for 2nd place in the MSFA MEL division; they missed the postseason NAIA playoffs for only second time in the team's history.

== Schedule ==
(7–3 overall, 5–2 conference)

The 2009 season saw the first home loss since the last game of 2001 in a November 7 defeat by St. Xavier. Over that time period, the Cougars won 56 consecutive home games. It also marked the first time the Cougars were not in the NAIA postseason playoff since their inaugural 1998 season.

Date	Time	Opponent	Rank	Site	Result	Attendance
September 12	Noon	Iowa Wesleyan*	No. 4	Bishop D'Arcy Stadium; Fort Wayne, IN	W 55–0	4,000
September 19	2:00pm	at No. 9 St. Ambrose*	No. 4	Brady Street Stadium; Davenport, IA	W 30–10	1,500
September 26	Noon	Marian	No. 4	Bishop D'Arcy Stadium; Fort Wayne, IN	W 28–7	4,100
October 3	7:00pm	at No. 23 Malone	No. 4	Fawcett Stadium; Canton, OH	W 42–14	2,000
October 10	6:00pm	at No. 20 Walsh	No. 4	Fawcett Stadium; Canton, OH	W 20–14	2,549
October 17	Noon	Trinity International^{†}	No. 4	Bishop D'Arcy Stadium; Fort Wayne, IN	W 63–7	4,000
October 24	2:00pm	at Missouri U of S&T*	No. 4	Rolla, MO	L 37–39	2,500
October 31	Noon	Olivet Nazarene	No. 8	Bishop D'Arcy Stadium; Fort Wayne, IN	W 56–7	3,100
November 7	Noon	No. 6 Saint Xavier	No. 8	Bishop D'Arcy Stadium; Fort Wayne, IN	L 24–36	4,000
November 14	1:00pm	at No. 25 Taylor	No. 11	Jim Wheeler Memorial Stadium; Upland, IN	L 16–23	
*Non-conference game; ^{†}Homecoming; Rankings from Coaches' Poll released prior to the game; All times are in Eastern time

== Ranking movements ==
Ranking movements Legend: ██ Increase in ranking ██ Decrease in ranking
	Week											
Poll	Pre	1	2	3	4	5	6	7	8	9	10	Final
NAIA Coaches' Poll	4	4	4	4	4	4	4	8	8	11	18	17
