= 2009 Sioux Falls Cougars football team =

American college football season

2009 Sioux Falls Cougars football

NAIA national champion GPAC champion

NAIA National Championship Game, W 25–22 vs. Lindenwood
- Conference: Great Plains Athletic Conference
- Record: 15–0 (10–0 GPAC)
- Head coach: Kalen DeBoer (5th season)
- Offensive coordinator: Chuck Morrell (11th season)
- Defensive coordinator: Jon Anderson (8th season)

2009 Great Plains Athletic Conference football standings
	Conf.			Overall
Team	W		L	W		L
No. 1 Sioux Falls $^	10	–	0	15	–	0
No. 5 Morningside ^	9	–	1	10	–	2
No. 13 Hastings ^	8	–	2	9	–	3
No. 25 Northwestern (IA)	7	–	3	7	–	3
Midland Lutheran	6	–	4	6	–	5
Nebraska Wesleyan	5	–	5	5	–	5
Dakota Wesleyan	4	–	6	4	–	6
Briar Cliff	4	–	6	4	–	7
Doane	4	–	6	4	–	7
Concordia (NE)	3	–	7	3	–	7
Dordt	0	–	10	1	–	10
Dana	0	–	10	0	–	11
$ – Conference champion; ^ – NAIA playoff participant; Rankings from NAIA Coaches' Poll

The 2009 Sioux Falls Cougars football team represented the University of Sioux Falls in the 2009 NAIA football season. The Cougars won the 2009 NAIA Football National Championship with a 25–22 victory over the third-ranked Lindenwood Lions. Additionally, the team secured the Great Plains Athletic Conference championship with a perfect 10–0 record. This marked the school's fourth NAIA national championship (1996, 2006, 2008) and its third in four years. The team was coached by Kalen DeBoer.

Quarterback Lorenzo Brown was named the NAIA Player of the Year prior to the game. Sioux Falls ended the season with a 29-game winning streak going back through the 2008 season. They extended this streak to 42 games, which tied an NAIA record before losing in the 2010 championship game After the season, DeBoer left to take the offensive coordinator job at Southern Illinois University Carbondale. He finished his tenure at Sioux Falls with a 67–3 record and three national titles.

== Schedule ==
Game	Date	Opponent	Result	Cougars	Opponents	Record
1	9/5	Nebraska Wesleyan	Win	44	3	1–0 (1–0)
2	9/12	@ Dana	Win	76	3	2–0 (2–0)
3	9/19	#19 Hastings	Win	42	19	3–0 (3–0)
4	9/26	@ Concordia (NE)	Win	80	0	4–0 (4–0)
5	10/3	Doane	Win	64	0	5–0 (5–0)
6	10/8	@ Briar Cliff	Win	41	8	6–0 (6–0)
7	10/17	@ North Dakota (FCS)	Win	28	13	7–0 (6–0)
8	10/24	Dakota Wesleyan	Win	59	7	8–0 (7–0)
9	10/31	@ #12 Northwestern	Win	49	14	9–0 (8–0)
10	11/7	Dordt	Win	58	0	10–0 (9–0)
11	11/14	@ #4 Morningside	Win	49	21	11–0 (10–0)
12	11/21	#14 Minot State (NAIA First Round)	Win	63	21	12–0 (10–0)
13	11/28	#7 Morningside (NAIA Quarterfinals)	Win	49	21	13–0 (10–0)
14	12/5	#4 St. Xavier (NAIA Semifinals)	Win	48	6	14–0 (10–0)
15	12/19	#3 Lindenwood (NAIA Championship)	Win	25	22	15–0 (10–0)

USF went wire-to-wire as the number one team in the nation.

== Game summaries ==
=== Nebraska Wesleyan ===
Statistics

Statistics	Nebraska Wesleyan	Sioux Falls
First downs	2	23
Plays–yards	38–28	81–435
Rushes–yards	14–22	53–234
Passing yards	14	201
Passing: comp–att–int	5–16–1	19–28–0
Time of possession	19:24	40:36

Team	Category	Player	Statistics
Nebraska Wesleyan	Passing	Matt Hagge	5/16, 14 yards, 1 INT
Nebraska Wesleyan	Rushing	Steve Fricke	2 carries, 8 yards
Nebraska Wesleyan	Receiving	Jake Pelton	1 reception, 6 yards
Sioux Falls	Passing	Lorenzo Brown	18/27, 187 yards, 2 TD
Sioux Falls	Rushing	Ryan Lowmiller	22 carries, 137 yards, 1 TD
Sioux Falls	Receiving	Jon Ryan	7 receptions, 102 yards, 1 TD
