= 2022 Eastern Illinois Panthers football team =

American college football season

2022 Eastern Illinois Panthers football
- Conference: Ohio Valley Conference
- Record: 2–9 (1–4 OVC)
- Head coach: Chris Wilkerson (1st season)
- Offensive coordinator: Joe Davis (1st season)
- Defensive coordinator: Adam Gristick (1st season)
- Home stadium: O'Brien Field

2022 Ohio Valley Conference football standings
	Conf.			Overall
Team	W		L	W		L
No. 15 Southeast Missouri State +^	5	–	0	9	–	3
UT Martin +	5	–	0	7	–	4
Tennessee State	2	–	3	4	–	7
Tennessee Tech	2	–	3	4	–	7
Lindenwood *	2	–	3	7	–	3
Eastern Illinois	1	–	4	2	–	9
Murray State	1	–	4	2	–	9
+ – Conference co-champions; ^ – FCS playoff participant; Note: Lindenwood ineligible for OVC title and FCS postseason play due to transition from NCAA Division II.; Rankings from STATS Poll

The 2022 Eastern Illinois Panthers football team represented Eastern Illinois University as a member of the Ohio Valley Conference (OVC) during the 2022 NCAA Division I FCS football season. The Panthers were led by first-year head coach Chris Wilkerson and played home games at O'Brien Field in Charleston, Illinois.

== Preseason ==
=== Preseason coaches' poll ===
The OVC released their preseason coaches' poll on July 19, 2022. The Panthers were picked to finish in second to last place.

=== Preseason All-OVC team ===
The Panthers had six players selected to the preseason all-OVC team.

Offense

- Isaiah Hill – WR
- Jay Vallie — TE

Defense

- Jordan Miles – DE
- Tim Varga — DE
- Russell Dandy — CB
- Jordan Vincent — NB

== Schedule ==
Date	Time	Opponent	Site	TV	Result	Attendance
September 1	7:00 p.m.	at Northern Illinois*	Huskie Stadium; DeKalb, IL	ESPN+	L 27–34	10,864
September 10	6:00 p.m.	No. 11 Chattanooga*	O'Brien Field; Charleston, IL	ESPN+	L 20–38	6,565
September 17	6:30 p.m.	at Illinois State*	Hancock Stadium; Normal, IL (Mid-America Classic)	Marquee	L 7–35	8,208
September 24	4:00 p.m.	at Murray State	Roy Kidd Stadium; Murray, KY	ESPN+	W 35–21	10,112
October 8	2:00 p.m.	Northwestern State*	O'Brien Field; Charleston, IL	ESPN+	W 35–27	3,153
October 15	2:00 p.m.	Lindenwood^{†}	O'Brien Field; Charleston, IL	ESPN+	L 34–37 ^{2OT}	6,875
October 22	2:00 p.m.	at Tennessee State	Hale Stadium; Nashville, TN	ESPN+	L 17–37	6,237
October 29	2:00 p.m.	Tennessee Tech	O'Brien Field; Charleston, IL	ESPN+	L 17–20	5,817
November 5	7:00 p.m.	at McNeese State*	Cowboy Stadium; Lake Charles, LA	ESPN+	L 15–29	7,520
November 12	2:00 p.m.	No. 20 Southeast Missouri State	O'Brien Field; Charleston, IL	ESPN+	L 7–31	1,831
November 19	2:00 p.m.	at No. 25 UT Martin	Graham Stadium; Martin, TN	ESPN+	L 31–34	3,003
*Non-conference game; ^{†}Homecoming; Rankings from STATS Poll released prior to the game; All times are in Central time

== Game summaries ==
=== At Northern Illinois ===
	1	2	3	4	Total
Panthers	3	3	7	14	27
Huskies	7	14	7	6	34

=== No. 11 Chattanooga ===
	1	2	3	4	Total
No. 11 Mocs	7	7	14	10	38
Panthers	10	0	10	0	20

=== At Illinois State ===
	1	2	3	4	Total
Panthers	7	0	0	0	7
Redbirds	7	14	14	0	35

=== Murray State ===
	1	2	3	4	Total
Panthers	14	10	0	11	35
Racers	7	7	0	7	21

=== Northwestern State ===
	1	2	3	4	Total
Demons	7	0	7	13	27
Panthers	21	14	0	0	35

=== Lindenwood ===
	1	2	3	4	OT	2OT	Total
Lions	0	14	0	10	7	6	37
Panthers	7	3	7	7	7	3	34

=== At Tennessee State ===
	1	2	3	4	Total
Panthers	0	0	14	3	17
Tigers	3	24	0	10	37

=== Tennessee Tech ===
	1	2	3	4	Total
Golden Eagles	0	3	10	7	20
Panthers	3	14	0	0	17

=== At McNeese State ===
	1	2	3	4	Total
Panthers	0	7	0	8	15
Cowboys	10	9	7	3	29

=== No. 20 Southeast Missouri State ===
	1	2	3	4	Total
No. 20 Redhawks	0	21	3	7	31
Panthers	0	7	0	0	7

=== At No. 25 UT Martin ===
	1	2	3	4	Total
Panthers	17	0	7	7	31
No. 25 Skyhawks	14	7	6	7	34
