= 2022 Tennessee State Tigers football team =

American college football season

2022 Tennessee State Tigers football
- Conference: Ohio Valley Conference
- Record: 4–7 (2–3 OVC)
- Head coach: Eddie George (2nd season)
- Offensive coordinator: Theron Aych (1st season)
- Offensive scheme: Pro-style
- Defensive coordinator: Brandon Fisher (2nd season)
- Base defense: Multiple 3–3–5
- Home stadium: Nissan Stadium

2022 Ohio Valley Conference football standings
	Conf.			Overall
Team	W		L	W		L
No. 15 Southeast Missouri State +^	5	–	0	9	–	3
UT Martin +	5	–	0	7	–	4
Tennessee State	2	–	3	4	–	7
Tennessee Tech	2	–	3	4	–	7
Lindenwood *	2	–	3	7	–	3
Eastern Illinois	1	–	4	2	–	9
Murray State	1	–	4	2	–	9
+ – Conference co-champions; ^ – FCS playoff participant; Note: Lindenwood ineligible for OVC title and FCS postseason play due to transition from NCAA Division II.; Rankings from STATS Poll

The 2022 Tennessee State Tigers football team represented Tennessee State University as a member of the Ohio Valley Conference (OVC) during the 2022 NCAA Division I FCS football season. They are led by second-year head coach Eddie George and play their games at Nissan Stadium in Nashville, Tennessee.

== Schedule ==
Date	Time	Opponent	Site	TV	Result	Attendance
September 3	3:00 p.m.	at No. 13 Eastern Washington*	Roos Field; Cheney, WA	ESPN+	L 29–36	3,932
September 10	6:00 p.m.	vs. No. 13 Jackson State*	Liberty Bowl Memorial Stadium; Memphis, TN (Southern Heritage Classic)		L 3–16	51,351
September 17	6:00 p.m.	at Middle Tennessee*	Johnny "Red" Floyd Stadium; Murfreesboro, TN	ESPN3/ESPN+	L 6–49	22,227
October 1	1:00 p.m.	Lane*	Hale Stadium; Nashville, TN (John Merritt Classic)	ESPN+	L 27–28 ^{OT}	11,553
October 8	5:00 p.m.	Bethune–Cookman*^{†}	Nissan Stadium; Nashville, TN	ESPN+	W 41–17	22,231
October 15	6:00 p.m.	at Tennessee Tech	Tucker Stadium; Cookeville, TN (Sgt. York Trophy)	ESPN+	W 30–14	5,883
October 22	2:00 p.m.	Eastern Illinois	Nissan Stadium; Nashville, TN	ESPN+	W 37–17	6,237
October 29	2:00 p.m.	at Murray State	Roy Stewart Stadium; Murray, KY	ESPN+	L 3–19	15,122
November 5	5:00 p.m.	No. 22 Southeast Missouri State	Nissan Stadium; Nashville, TN	ESPN+	L 0–42	6,369
November 12	4:00 p.m.	UT Martin	Nissan Stadium; Nashville, TN (Sgt. York Trophy)	ESPN+	L 3–20	2,665
November 19	2:00 p.m.	at Texas A&M–Commerce*	Memorial Stadium; Commerce, TX	ESPN+	W 22–14	4,029
*Non-conference game; ^{†}Homecoming; Rankings from STATS Poll released prior to the game; All times are in Central time

== Game summaries ==
=== At No. 13 Eastern Washington ===
	1	2	3	4	Total
Tigers	19	0	0	10	29
No. 13 Eagles	15	14	0	7	36

=== Vs. No. 13 Jackson State ===
	1	2	3	4	Total
No. 13 JSU Tigers	0	6	3	7	16
TSU Tigers	3	0	0	0	3

=== At Middle Tennessee ===
	1	2	3	4	Total
Tigers	0	0	6	0	6
Blue Raiders	21	21	7	0	49

=== Lane ===
	1	2	3	4	OT	Total
Dragons	6	7	7	0	8	28
Tigers	7	3	7	3	7	27

=== Bethune–Cookman ===
	1	2	3	4	Total
Wildcats	3	0	7	7	17
Tigers	7	24	3	7	41

=== At Tennessee Tech ===
	1	2	3	4	Total
Tigers	0	16	14	0	30
Golden Eagles	0	0	0	14	14

=== Eastern Illinois ===
	1	2	3	4	Total
Panthers	0	0	14	3	17
Tigers	3	24	0	10	37

=== At Murray State ===
	1	2	3	4	Total
Tigers	0	3	0	0	3
Racers	0	6	6	7	19

=== No. 22 Southeast Missouri State ===
	1	2	3	4	Total
No. 22 Redhawks	7	14	7	14	42
Tigers	0	0	0	0	0

=== UT Martin ===
	1	2	3	4	Total
Skyhawks	14	0	0	6	20
Tigers	0	3	0	0	3

=== At Texas A&M–Commerce ===
	1	2	3	4	Total
Tigers	7	12	3	0	22
Lions	7	0	7	0	14
