= 2022 Tennessee Tech Golden Eagles football team =

American college football season

2022 Tennessee Tech Golden Eagles football
- Conference: Ohio Valley Conference
- Record: 4–7 (2–3 OVC)
- Head coach: Dewayne Alexander (5th season)
- Offensive coordinator: Wesley Satterfield (1st season)
- Defensive coordinator: Donnie Suber (5th season)
- Home stadium: Tucker Stadium

2022 Ohio Valley Conference football standings
	Conf.			Overall
Team	W		L	W		L
No. 15 Southeast Missouri State +^	5	–	0	9	–	3
UT Martin +	5	–	0	7	–	4
Tennessee State	2	–	3	4	–	7
Tennessee Tech	2	–	3	4	–	7
Lindenwood *	2	–	3	7	–	3
Eastern Illinois	1	–	4	2	–	9
Murray State	1	–	4	2	–	9
+ – Conference co-champions; ^ – FCS playoff participant; Note: Lindenwood ineligible for OVC title and FCS postseason play due to transition from NCAA Division II.; Rankings from STATS Poll

The 2022 Tennessee Tech Golden Eagles football team represented Tennessee Technological University as a member of the Ohio Valley Conference (OVC) during the 2022 NCAA Division I FCS football season. They were led by fifth-year head coach Dewayne Alexander and played their games at Tucker Stadium in Cookeville, Tennessee.

== Schedule ==
Date	Time	Opponent	Site	TV	Result	Attendance
September 2	7:00 p.m.	at Kansas*	David Booth Kansas Memorial Stadium; Lawrence, KS	ESPN+	L 10–56	34,902
September 10	6:00 p.m.	Texas A&M–Commerce*	Tucker Stadium; Cookeville, TN	ESPN+	W 26–25	7,352
September 17	6:00 p.m.	No. 24 Samford*	Tucker Stadium; Cookeville, TN	ESPN+	L 28–33	9,249
October 1	2:00 p.m.	at No. 15 UT Martin	Graham Stadium; Martin, TN (Sgt. York Trophy)	ESPN+	L 25–48	6,412
October 8	2:00 p.m.	at No. 21 Southeast Missouri State	Houck Stadium; Cape Girardeau, MO	ESPN+	L 20–34	3,892
October 15	6:00 p.m.	Tennessee State	Tucker Stadium; Cookeville, TN (Sgt. York Trophy)	ESPN+	L 14–30	5,883
October 22	2:00 p.m.	at Kennesaw State*	Fifth Third Bank Stadium; Kennesaw, GA	ESPN+	L 30–33 ^{OT}	
October 29	2:00 p.m.	at Eastern Illinois	O'Brien Field; Charleston, IL	ESPN+	W 20–17	
November 5	1:30 p.m.	Lindenwood^{†}	Tucker Stadium; Cookeville, TN	ESPN+	W 35–34	7,100
November 12	4:00 p.m.	at North Alabama*	Braly Municipal Stadium; Florence, AL	ESPN+	W 35–27	
November 19	1:30 p.m.	North Carolina Central*	Tucker Stadium; Cookeville, TN	ESPN+	L 20–22	4,969
*Non-conference game; ^{†}Homecoming; Rankings from STATS Poll released prior to the game; All times are in Central time

== Game summaries ==
=== At Kansas ===
Tennessee Tech Golden Eagles at Kansas Jayhawks

Quarter	1	2	3	4	Total
Golden Eagles	0	3	0	7	10
Jayhawks	21	14	7	14	56

at David Booth Kansas Memorial Stadium • Lawrence, Kansas

- Date: Friday, September 2, 2022
- Game time: 7:00 pm CDT
- Game weather: Clear • Temperature: 89 °F (32 °C)
- Game attendance: 34,902
- Referee: Michael Vandervelde
- TV announcers (ESPN+): Noah Reed, Jay Sonnhalter

Game information

First quarter

- 11:26 KU Devin Neal 19 yard rush (Jacob Borcila kick), 4-40, 01:53, KU 7–0
- 9:06 KU Daniel Hishaw 9 yard rush (Jacob Borcila kick), 2-65, 00:49, KU 14–0
- 4:42 KU Cobee Bryant 61 yard blocked field goal return (Jacob Borcila kick), KU 21–0

Second quarter

- 14:07 TTU Devin Parker 28 yd FG, 7-23, 03:14, KU 21–3
- 3:23 KU Jalon Daniels 11 yard rush (Jocob Borcila kick), 7-23, 3:14, KU 28–3
- 0:07 KU Mason Fairchild 2 yard pass from Jalon Daniels (Jacob Borcila kick), 7-63, 01:29, KU 35–3

Third quarter

- 4:21 KU Devin Neal 80 yard rush (Jacob Borcila kick), 1-80, 00:13, KU 42–3

Fourth quarter

- 13:25 KU Sevion Morrison 11 yard rush (Jacob Borcila kick), 4-76, 02:01, KU 49–3
- 9:46 KU Jason Bean 7 yard rush (Jacob Borcila kick), 4-25, 02:42, KU 56–3
- 5:00 TTU Heath Price 4 yard pass from Jeremiah Oatsvall (Devin Parker kick), 9-75, 04:46, KU 56–10

Statistics	TTU	KU
First downs	14	21
Plays–yards	69–190	49–502
Rushes–yards	43–93	30–297
Passing yards	97	205
Passing: comp–att–int	15–26–1	16–19–1
Time of possession	35:36	24:24

Team	Category	Player	Statistics
Tennessee Tech	Passing	Jeremiah Oatsvall	10/18 76 yards 1 TD 1 INT
Tennessee Tech	Rushing	Jeremiah Oatsvall	12 carries 42 yards
Tennessee Tech	Receiving	Willie Miller	3 receptions 28 yards
Kansas	Passing	Jalon Daniels	15/18 189 yards 1 TD 1 INT
Kansas	Rushing	Devin Neal	4 carries 108 yards 2 TDs
Kansas	Receiving	Quentin Skinner	1 reception 56 yards

=== Texas A&M–Commerce ===
	1	2	3	4	Total
Commerce Lions	0	16	3	6	25
Golden Eagles	0	3	3	20	26

=== No. 24 Samford ===
	1	2	3	4	Total
No. 24 Bulldogs	10	7	7	9	33
Golden Eagles	14	7	0	7	28

=== At No. 15 UT Martin ===
	1	2	3	4	Total
Golden Eagles	7	7	7	7	28
No. 15 Skyhawks	14	14	10	7	45

=== At No. 21 Southeast Missouri State ===
	1	2	3	4	Total
Golden Eagles	3	10	0	7	20
No. 21 Redhawks	10	17	7	0	34

=== Tennessee State ===
	1	2	3	4	Total
Tigers	0	16	14	0	30
Golden Eagles	0	0	0	14	14

=== At Kennesaw State ===
	1	2	3	4	OT	Total
Golden Eagles	0	10	10	7	3	30
Owls	7	10	0	10	6	33

=== At Eastern Illinois ===
	1	2	3	4	Total
Golden Eagles	0	3	10	7	20
Panthers	3	14	0	0	17

=== Lindenwood ===
	1	2	3	4	Total
Lindenwood Lions	0	21	7	6	34
Golden Eagles	7	7	14	7	35

=== At North Alabama ===
Tennessee Tech Golden Eagles (3-6) vs North Alabama Lions (1-8)

Quarter	1	2	3	4	Total
Golden Eagles	7	14	14	0	35
Lions	0	17	7	3	27

at Braly Municipal Stadium, Florence, AL

- Date: November 12th
- Game time: 4:00 pm
- Game weather: 38 °F (3 °C) • Weather: Cloudy • Wind: SE 11 MPH
- Game attendance: 6,132
- Referee: Brad Carrell
- TV: ESPN+

Statistics	Tennessee Tech	North Alabama
First downs	24	26
Plays–yards		
Rushes–yards		
Passing yards	186	333
Passing: comp–att–int		
Time of possession	28:56	31:04

Team	Category	Player	Statistics
Tennessee Tech	Passing		
Tennessee Tech	Rushing		
Tennessee Tech	Receiving		
North Alabama	Passing		
North Alabama	Rushing		
North Alabama	Receiving		

Scoring summary

Quarter	Time	Drive			Team	Scoring information	Score	
Quarter	Time	Plays	Yards	TOP	Team	Scoring information	Tennessee Tech	North Alabama
							0	0
"TOP" = time of possession. For other American football terms, see Glossary of American football.							0	0

=== North Carolina Central ===
	1	2	3	4	Total
Eagles	10	3	0	9	22
Golden Eagles	0	7	7	6	20
