= 2022 Murray State Racers football team =

American college football season

2022 Murray State Racers football
- Conference: Ohio Valley Conference
- Record: 2–9 (1–4 OVC)
- Head coach: Dean Hood (3rd season)
- Offensive coordinator: Ben Hodges (3rd season)
- Defensive coordinator: Dillon Sanders (3rd season)
- Home stadium: Roy Stewart Stadium

2022 Ohio Valley Conference football standings
| | Conf. | | | Overall |
| Team | W | | L | W | | L |
|---|---|---|---|---|---|---|
| No. 15 Southeast Missouri State +^ | 5 | – | 0 | 9 | – | 3 |
| UT Martin + | 5 | – | 0 | 7 | – | 4 |
| Tennessee State | 2 | – | 3 | 4 | – | 7 |
| Tennessee Tech | 2 | – | 3 | 4 | – | 7 |
| Lindenwood * | 2 | – | 3 | 7 | – | 3 |
| Eastern Illinois | 1 | – | 4 | 2 | – | 9 |
| Murray State | 1 | – | 4 | 2 | – | 9 |
+ – Conference co-champions; ^ – FCS playoff participant; Note: Lindenwood ineligible for OVC title and FCS postseason play due to transition from NCAA Division II.; Rankings from STATS Poll

The 2022 Murray State Racers football team represented Murray State University as a member of the Ohio Valley Conference (OVC) during the 2022 NCAA Division I FCS football season. They were led by third-year head coach Dean Hood and played their games at Roy Stewart Stadium in Murray, Kentucky.

== Schedule ==
| Date | Time | Opponent | Site | TV | Result | Attendance |
|---|---|---|---|---|---|---|
| September 3 | 7:00 p.m. | at Texas Tech* | Jones AT&T Stadium; Lubbock, TX | ESPN+ | L 10–63 | 60,201 |
| September 10 | 6:00 p.m. | Jacksonville State* | Roy Stewart Stadium; Murray, KY | ESPN+ | L 3–34 | 6,911 |
| September 17 | 1:00 p.m. | at Ball State* | Scheumann Stadium; Muncie, IN | ESPN+ | L 0–31 | 14,413 |
| September 24 | 4:00 p.m. | Eastern Illinois | Roy Stewart Stadium; Murray, KY | ESPN+ | L 21–35 | 10,112 |
| October 1 | 6:00 p.m. | at No. 21 Southeastern Louisiana* | Strawberry Stadium; Hammond, LA | ESPN+ | L 14–48 | 5,127 |
| October 8 | 2:00 p.m. | No. 18 UT Martin | Roy Stewart Stadium; Murray, KY | ESPN+ | L 16–45 | 6,492 |
| October 15 | 3:00 p.m. | at No. 24 Austin Peay* | Fortera Stadium; Clarksville, TN | ESPN+ | L 17–52 | 7,117 |
| October 22 | 1:00 p.m. | at Lindenwood | Harlen C. Hunter Stadium; St. Charles, MO | ESPN+ | L 18–33 | 3,851 |
| October 29 | 2:00 p.m. | Tennessee State^{†} | Roy Stewart Stadium; Murray, KY | ESPN+ | W 19–3 | 15,122 |
| November 12 | 1:00 p.m. | Robert Morris* | Roy Stewart Stadium; Murray, KY | ESPN3 | W 27–9 | 5,037 |
| November 19 | 1:00 p.m. | at No. 17 Southeast Missouri State | Houck Stadium; Cape Girardeau, MO | ESPN+ | L 22–52 | 3,375 |
*Non-conference game; ^{†}Homecoming; Rankings from STATS Poll released prior to the game; All times are in Central time

== Game summaries ==
=== At Texas Tech ===
Murray State Racers at Texas Tech Red Raiders – Game summary

| Quarter | 1 | 2 | 3 | 4 | Total |
|---|---|---|---|---|---|
| Racers | 3 | 7 | 0 | 0 | 10 |
| Red Raiders | 14 | 28 | 14 | 7 | 63 |

at Jones AT&T Stadium, Lubbock, Texas

- Date: September 3
- Game time: 7:00 p.m. CDT
- Game weather: Sunny
- Game attendance: 60,201
- Referee: Dan Scanlan
- TV announcers (ESPN+): Noah Reed and Taylor McHargue

Game information

First quarter

- TTU – Loic Fouonji 45-yard pass from Tyler Shough (Trey Wolff kick), 10:34. Red Raiders 7–0. Drive: 4 plays, 94 yards, 1:20.
- TTU – Tahj Brooks 14-yard run (Gino Garcia kick), 7:28. Red Raiders 14–0. Drive: 4 plays, 59 yards, 1:07.
- MUR – Aaron Baum 31-yard field goal, 2:29. Red Raiders 14–3. Drive: 10 plays, 62 yards, 4:59.

Second quarter

- TTU – Jerand Bradley 30-yard pass from Donovan Smith (Trey Wolff kick), 14:35. Red Raiders 21–3. Drive: 11 plays, 75 yards, 2:54.
- MUR – Jacob Bell 54-yard pass from D. J. Williams (Aaron Baum kick), 13:29. Red Raiders 21–10. Drive: 4 plays, 75 yards, 1:06.
- TTU – Loic Fouonji 39-yard pass from Donovan Smith (Gino Garcia kick), 13:13. Red Raiders 28–10. Drive: 1 play, 39 yards, 0:16.
- TTU – Tahj Brooks 3-yard run (Trey Wolff kick), 8:30. Red Raiders 35–10. Drive: 8 plays, 32 yards, 3:01.
- TTU – Tahj Brooks 23-yard run (Gino Garcia kick), 2:26. Red Raiders 42–10. Drive: 6 plays, 80 yards, 1:59.

Third quarter

- TTU – SaRodrick Thompson 30-yard pass from Donovan Smith (Trey Wolff kick), 12:38. Red Raiders 49–10. Drive: 5 plays, 63 yards, 2:12.
- TTU – Jerand Bradley 14-yard pass from Donovan Smith (Gino Garcia kick), 9:34. Red Raiders 56–10. Drive: 3 plays, 47 yards, 0:59.

Fourth quarter

- TTU – Mason Tharp 21-yard pass from Behren Morton (Trey Wolff kick), 13:40. Red Raiders 63–10. Drive: 2 plays, 35 yards, 0:27.

Top passers

- MUR – D. J. Williams – 8/16, 207 yards, TD
- TTU – Donovan Smith – 14/16, 221 yards, 4 TD

Top rushers

- MUR – Damonta Witherspoon – 13 rushes, 36 yards
- TTU – Tahj Brooks – 6 rushes, 50 yards, 3 TD

Top receivers

- MUR – Jacob Bell – 2 receptions, 76 yards, TD
- TTU – Jerand Bradley – 6 receptions, 108 yards, 2 TD

=== Jacksonville State ===
| | 1 | 2 | 3 | 4 | Total |
|---|---|---|---|---|---|
| Gamecocks | 7 | 3 | 10 | 14 | 34 |
| Racers | 0 | 3 | 0 | 0 | 3 |

=== At Ball State ===
Murray State Racers (FCS) at Ball State Cardinals

| Team | 1 | 2 | 3 | 4 | Total |
|---|---|---|---|---|---|
| Racers | 0 | 0 | 0 | 0 | 0 |
| • Cardinals | 7 | 7 | 10 | 7 | 31 |

- Date: September 17, 2022
- Location: Scheumann Stadium
  Muncie, IN
- Game start: 2:00 p.m. EDT
- Elapsed time: 3 hours and 43 minutes
- Game attendance: 14,413
- Game weather: Sunny, 82 °F (28 °C)
- Referee: Jeremy Valentine
- TV announcers (ESPN+): Jim Barbar (play-by-play), Ryan Cavanaugh (analyst)

| Statistics | Murray State | Ball State |
|---|---|---|
| First downs | 9 | 26 |
| Total yards | 155 | 476 |
| Rushing yards | 87 | 249 |
| Passing yards | 68 | 227 |
| Turnovers | 3 | 1 |
| Time of possession | 23:32 | 36:28 |

| Team | Category | Player | Statistics |
|---|---|---|---|
| Murray State | Passing | Isaac McNamee | 7/22, 57 yards, 2 INT |
| Murray State | Rushing | Jawaun Northington | 17 carries, 71 yards |
| Murray State | Receiving | DeQuan Dallas | 2 receptions, 27 yards |
| Ball State | Passing | John Paddock | 27/44, 227 yards, 3 TD, 1 INT |
| Ball State | Rushing | Carson Steele | 25 carries, 141 yards, 1 TD |
| Ball State | Receiving | Jayshon Jackson | 6 receptions, 64 yards, 1 TD |

=== Eastern Illinois ===
| | 1 | 2 | 3 | 4 | Total |
|---|---|---|---|---|---|
| Panthers | 14 | 10 | 0 | 11 | 35 |
| Racers | 7 | 7 | 0 | 7 | 21 |

=== At No. 21 Southeastern Louisiana ===
Murray State Racers at Southeastern Louisiana Lions

| Quarter | 1 | 2 | 3 | 4 | Total |
|---|---|---|---|---|---|
| Racers | 0 | 7 | 7 | 0 | 14 |
| No. 21 Lions | 7 | 10 | 3 | 28 | 48 |

at Strawberry Stadium, Hammond, LA

- Date: October 1
- Game time: 6:00 p.m.
- Game weather: Clear
- Game attendance: 5,127
- Referee: Nolan Dumas
- TV: ESPN3

=== No. 18 UT Martin ===
| | 1 | 2 | 3 | 4 | Total |
|---|---|---|---|---|---|
| No. 18 Skyhawks | 0 | 14 | 7 | 24 | 45 |
| Racers | 0 | 9 | 7 | 0 | 16 |

=== At No. 24 Austin Peay ===
| | 1 | 2 | 3 | 4 | Total |
|---|---|---|---|---|---|
| Racers | 3 | 14 | 0 | 0 | 17 |
| No. 24 Governors | 21 | 14 | 10 | 7 | 52 |

=== At Lindenwood ===
| | 1 | 2 | 3 | 4 | Total |
|---|---|---|---|---|---|
| Racers | 12 | 3 | 3 | 0 | 18 |
| Lions | 0 | 17 | 7 | 9 | 33 |

=== Tennessee State ===
| | 1 | 2 | 3 | 4 | Total |
|---|---|---|---|---|---|
| Tigers | 0 | 3 | 0 | 0 | 3 |
| Racers | 0 | 6 | 6 | 7 | 19 |

=== Robert Morris ===
| | 1 | 2 | 3 | 4 | Total |
|---|---|---|---|---|---|
| Colonials | 0 | 0 | 9 | 0 | 9 |
| Racers | 7 | 0 | 0 | 20 | 27 |

=== At No. 17 Southeast Missouri State ===
| | 1 | 2 | 3 | 4 | Total |
|---|---|---|---|---|---|
| Racers | 3 | 6 | 6 | 7 | 22 |
| No. 17 Redhawks | 21 | 10 | 14 | 7 | 52 |
