= 2009 NAIA football season =

American college football season

- National Championship: Barron Stadium; Rome, GA; December 19, 2009
- Champion: Sioux Falls
- Player of the Year: Lorenzo Brown (quarterback, Sioux Falls)

The 2009 NAIA football season was the component of the 2009 college football season organized by the National Association of Intercollegiate Athletics (NAIA) in the United States. The season's playoffs, known as the NAIA Football National Championship, culminated with the championship game on December 19, at Barron Stadium in Rome, Georgia. The Sioux Falls Cougars defeated the Lindenwood Lions, 25–22, in the title game to win the program's second consecutive NAIA title.

== Conference standings ==
2009 Central States Football League standings
	Conf.			Overall
Team	W		L	W		L
NW Oklahoma State #	5	–	0	7	–	3
No. 19 Langston $^	4	–	1	8	–	4
Southern Nazarene	3	–	2	6	–	5
SAGU	2	–	3	3	–	7
Bacone	1	–	4	1	–	8
Texas College	0	–	5	0	–	10
$ – Conference champion; ^ – NAIA playoff participant # – Northwestern Oklahoma State was ineligible for the conference title.; Rankings from NAIA Coaches' Poll

2009 Dakota Athletic Conference football standings
	Conf.			Overall
Team	W		L	W		L
No. 14 Minot State ^	7	–	1	8	–	3
No. 18 Dickinson State +^	7	–	1	7	–	4
Black Hills State	5	–	3	6	–	4
Jamestown	5	–	3	5	–	5
South Dakota Mines	3	–	5	5	–	5
Valley City State	3	–	5	3	–	7
Dakota State	2	–	6	2	–	7
Mayville State	0	–	8	1	–	9
+ – Conference co-champions; ^ – NAIA playoff participant; Rankings from NAIA Coaches' Poll

2009 Frontier Conference football standings
	Conf.			Overall
Team	W		L	W		L
No. 3 Carroll (MT) $^	10	–	0	13	–	1
No. 22 Eastern Oregon	7	–	3	7	–	4
Montana Tech	7	–	3	7	–	4
Montana Western	4	–	6	4	–	6
Montana State–Northern	1	–	9	2	–	9
Rocky Mountain	1	–	9	2	–	9
$ – Conference champion; ^ – NAIA playoff participant; Rankings from NAIA Coaches' Poll

2009 Great Plains Athletic Conference football standings
	Conf.			Overall
Team	W		L	W		L
No. 1 Sioux Falls $^	10	–	0	15	–	0
No. 5 Morningside ^	9	–	1	10	–	2
No. 13 Hastings ^	8	–	2	9	–	3
No. 25 Northwestern (IA)	7	–	3	7	–	3
Midland Lutheran	6	–	4	6	–	5
Nebraska Wesleyan	5	–	5	5	–	5
Dakota Wesleyan	4	–	6	4	–	6
Briar Cliff	4	–	6	4	–	7
Doane	4	–	6	4	–	7
Concordia (NE)	3	–	7	3	–	7
Dordt	0	–	10	1	–	10
Dana	0	–	10	0	–	11
$ – Conference champion; ^ – NAIA playoff participant; Rankings from NAIA Coaches' Poll

2009 Heart of America Athletic Conference football standings
	Conf.			Overall
Team	W		L	W		L
No. 2 Lindenwood $^	10	–	0	13	–	1
No. 8 MidAmerica Nazarene ^	9	–	1	10	–	2
No. 10 Missouri Valley ^	8	–	2	8	–	3
No. 23 Baker	7	–	3	7	–	3
Central Methodist	6	–	4	6	–	5
Benedictine (KS)	5	–	5	6	–	5
Avila	3	–	7	4	–	7
Evangel	3	–	7	3	–	7
Graceland	3	–	7	3	–	7
William Jewell	1	–	9	1	–	9
Culver–Stockton	0	–	10	0	–	10
$ – Conference champion; ^ – NAIA playoff participants; Rankings from NAIA Coaches' Poll

2009 Kansas Collegiate Athletic Conference football standings
	Conf.			Overall
Team	W		L	W		L
No. 6 Ottawa $^	9	–	0	11	–	1
No. 12 McPherson ^	8	–	1	9	–	2
No. 15 Friends	7	–	2	8	–	2
Sterling	5	–	4	6	–	4
Kansas Wesleyan	4	–	5	5	–	5
Bethany (KS)	3	–	6	4	–	6
Bethel (KS)	3	–	6	3	–	7
Saint Mary (KS)	3	–	6	3	–	7
Southwestern (KS)	3	–	6	3	–	7
Tabor	0	–	9	0	–	10
$ – Conference champion; ^ – NAIA playoff participant; Rankings from NAIA Coaches' Poll

2009 Mid-South Conference football standings
	Conf.			Overall
Team	W		L	W		L
East Division
No. 11 Cumberlands (KY) x^	5	–	1	9	–	2
Campbellsville	4	–	2	7	–	4
Georgetown (KY)	4	–	2	7	–	4
Virginia–Wise	4	–	2	5	–	6
Union (KY)	3	–	3	4	–	6
Pikeville	1	–	5	3	–	8
West Virginia Tech	0	–	6	3	–	8
West Division
No. 7 Lambuth x^	6	–	0	12	–	1
Belhaven	4	–	2	6	–	5
Bethel (TN)	4	–	2	5	–	6
Shorter	3	–	3	6	–	5
Cumberland (TN)	3	–	3	5	–	6
Kentucky Christian	1	–	5	1	–	9
Faulkner	0	–	6	2	–	9
x – Division champion/co-champions; ^ – NAIA playoff participant; Rankings from NAIA Coaches' Poll

2009 Mid-States Football Association standings
	Conf.			Overall
Team	W		L	W		L
Mideast League
No. 4 Saint Xavier x^	7	–	0	13	–	1
No. 16 Walsh	5	–	2	8	–	3
No. 17 Saint Francis (IN)	5	–	2	7	–	3
No. 20 Taylor	5	–	2	7	–	3
Marian (IN)	3	–	4	6	–	5
Malone	2	–	5	4	–	6
Olivet Nazarene	1	–	6	2	–	9
Trinity International	0	–	7	0	–	11
Midwest League
No. 9 McKendree x^	7	–	0	9	–	2
No. 21 Grand View	6	–	1	8	–	3
William Penn	5	–	2	7	–	5
St. Ambrose	4	–	3	6	–	4
Quincy	3	–	4	4	–	7
St. Francis (IL)	2	–	5	3	–	8
Iowa Wesleyan	1	–	6	2	–	9
Waldorf	0	–	7	1	–	9
x – League champion/co-champions ^ – NAIA playoff participant; Rankings from NAIA Coaches' Poll

2009 NAIA independents football records
	Conf.			Overall
Team	W		L	W		L
No. 24 Ohio Dominican		–		7	–	3
Peru State		–		7	–	4
Webber International		–		4	–	6
Haskell		–		3	–	7
Azusa Pacific		–		3	–	8
Southern Oregon		–		2	–	7
Southern Virginia		–		0	–	8
Edward Waters		–		0	–	10
Rankings from NAIA Coaches' Poll
