= DeDe Dorsey =

American football player (born 1984)

No. 30, 27, 29, 1
- Position: Running back

Personal information
- Born: August 1, 1984 (age 42); Broken Arrow, Oklahoma, U.S.
- Listed height: 5 ft 11 in (1.80 m)
- Listed weight: 210 lb (95 kg)

Career information
- College: Lindenwood
- NFL draft: 2006: undrafted

Career history
- Cincinnati Bengals (2006)*; Indianapolis Colts (2006); Cincinnati Bengals (2007–2009); Las Vegas Locomotives (2009); Detroit Lions (2010)*; Las Vegas Locomotives (2010-2012); Saskatchewan Roughriders (2013)*
- * Offseason or practice squad member only

Awards and highlights
- Super Bowl champion (XLI); 2× UFL champion (2009, 2010); UFL Championship Game MVP (2009); 2× NAIA All-American (2004–2005)

Career NFL statistics
- Rushing attempts: 26
- Rushing yards: 191
- Receptions: 6
- Receiving yards: 68
- Stats at Pro Football Reference
- Stats at CFL.ca (archive)

DeDe Dorsey (born August 1, 1984) is an American former professional football player who was a running back in the National Football League (NFL). He played college football for the Lindenwood Lions and was signed by the Cincinnati Bengals as an undrafted free agent in 2006.

Dorsey was also a member of the Indianapolis Colts and Detroit Lions. While a member of the Colts, Dorsey won a Super Bowl ring in Super Bowl XLI.

== College career ==
After graduating from Broken Arrow Senior High, Dorsey began his college career as a defensive back at Ottawa, where, in 2003, he returned a kickoff 98 yards for a touchdown and was a second-team all-NAIA selection on defense.

After his sophomore season, he transferred to Lindenwood. As a junior in 2004, he was named a first-team NAIA All-American as a defensive back after he scored three defensive touchdowns, even though he was moved from defense to running back with four games left during the regular season and rushed for 842 yards and nine touchdowns. As a senior, he was named first-team NAIA All-American as a running back after rushing for 1,600 yards and 18 touchdowns. It was the first time in NAIA history that a player was named first-team NAIA All-American on defense and offense in successive seasons. In less than three seasons as a defensive player, Dorsey had seven career interceptions, returning four for touchdowns, and blocked seven field goals and nine punts.

== Professional career ==
=== Cincinnati Bengals (first stint) ===
Dorsey signed with the Cincinnati Bengals as an undrafted free agent following the 2006 NFL draft. He was waived prior to the start of the 2006 season.

=== Indianapolis Colts ===
Dorsey was claimed off waivers by the Indianapolis Colts on September 3, 2006. He played in Super Bowl XLI for the Colts, helping them win, 29–17, against the Chicago Bears. The Colts waived Dorsey on September 1, 2007.

=== Cincinnati Bengals (second stint) ===
On September 25, 2007, Dorsey re-signed with the Cincinnati Bengals. As the third-string running back for the Bengals in 2007, Dorsey averaged 8.7 yards per carry after rushing for 183 yards on just 21 attempts. His 45-yard scamper on a forward lateral against the St. Louis Rams was the Bengals' longest run from scrimmage in three seasons. On November 18, 2007, in a game against the Arizona Cardinals, he blocked Mike Barr's punt in the third quarter and returned it 19 yards for a touchdown. The blocked punt was the Bengals' first since 1995 and their first blocked for a touchdown since 1989. Dorsey became only the third player in Bengals' history to single-handedly block a punt and recover it for a touchdown.

After week 4 of the 2008 NFL season, Dorsey was placed on injured reserve after pulling his hamstring. He had gained only eight yards on five carries before being injured. Dorsey did, however, have a 36-yard pass reception in week 2 during a loss to the Tennessee Titans.

Dorsey was released by the Bengals on September 14, 2009, after being on the inactive list for the first game of the season.

=== Las Vegas Locomotives (first stint) ===
Dorsey scored two touchdowns for the Las Vegas Locomotives against the California Redwoods in the first-ever game of the UFL on October 8, 2009. He rushed for 63 yards on nine carries and 3 receptions. On November 27, 2009, in the first-ever UFL Championship game, Dorsey rushed 11 times for 66 yards and scored on touchdown runs of 38 yards and 1 yard to help the Las Vegas Locomotives defeat the previously unbeaten Florida Tuskers 20–17 in overtime. Dorsey was named MVP of the game.

=== Detroit Lions ===
Dorsey signed a future contract with the Detroit Lions on February 9, 2010. He was released on September 4.

=== Las Vegas Locomotives (second stint) ===
Dorsey re-signed with the Las Vegas Locomotives on September 24, 2010. On October 5, he was named UFL Player Of The Week for week 3.

Dorsey signed with the Saskatchewan Roughriders on April 29, 2013. He was released on June 22, 2013.
