= Paul Raymond (American football) =

American football player (born 1986)

Profile
- Position: Wide receiver

Personal information
- Born: May 5, 1986 (age 40); Haiti
- Listed height: 5 ft 10 in (1.78 m)
- Listed weight: 185 lb (84 kg)

Career information
- College: Brown
- NFL draft: 2008: undrafted

Career history
- New York Jets (2008)*; Detroit Lions (2008)*; New York Giants (2008)*; New York Jets (2009)*; Cleveland Browns (2009)*; Tampa Bay Storm (2010)*; Omaha Nighthawks (2010)*
- * Offseason or practice squad member only

Awards and highlights
- Second-team All-Ivy League (2007)

Paul Renaud Raymond (born May 5, 1986) is a former American football wide receiver. He was signed by the New York Jets as an undrafted free agent in 2008. He played college football at Brown.

Raymond was also a member of the Detroit Lions, New York Giants, Cleveland Browns and Omaha Nighthawks.

== Professional career ==
=== New York Jets ===
Raymond was signed by the Jets as an undrafted free agent on May 2, 2008, but was waived by the team on August 30, 2008. He was signed to the Jets' practice squad on September 1, 2008, and waived from it on September 16, 2008. He was signed to the team's practice squad again on September 24, 2008. He was again waived from the Jets' practice squad on September 29, 2008.

=== Detroit Lions ===
Raymond was signed to the practice squad of the Detroit Lions on October 14, 2008. He was released on December 24.

=== New York Giants ===
Raymond was signed to the practice squad of the New York Giants on December 31, 2008 after cornerback Rashad Barksdale was activated from the practice squad.

=== New York Jets (second stint) ===
After the 2008 season, Raymond was re-signed to a future contract by the New York Jets on January 20, 2009. He was waived on August 15, 2009.

=== Cleveland Browns ===
Raymond was claimed off waivers by the Cleveland Browns on August 17, 2009. The move reunited him with Browns head coach Eric Mangini, who was head coach of the New York Jets during part of Raymond's time with the team. He was waived eight days late on August 25 when the team signed defensive end Brian Schaefering.
