= 2009 NAIA football national championship =

2009 NAIA Football National Championship
Lindenwood Lions	Sioux Falls Cougars
(13–0)	(14–0)
22	25
Head coach: Patrick Ross	Head coach: Kalen DeBoer
Coaches 3	Coaches 1
	1	2	3	4	Total
Lindenwood	0	14	8	0	22
Sioux Falls	5	3	14	3	25
- Date: December 19, 2009
- Season: 2009
- Stadium: Barron Stadium
- Location: Rome, Georgia
- MVP: Braden Wieking, Sioux Falls (Offense); Dominic Studzinski, Sioux Falls (Defense)
- Referee: Stan Self; Todd Parker; Dustin Rudolf; Stacy Hardin; Chad Wakefield; Mike Lawler; Hood Baldwin(Dan Wroe's shoes)
- Attendance: 5,000

The 2009 NAIA football national championship was played on December 19, 2009 at Barron Stadium in Rome, Georgia. The championship was won by the Sioux Falls Cougars over the Lindenwood Lions by a score of 25–22.

== Scoring Summary ==
Scoring summary

Quarter	Time	Drive			Team	Scoring information	Score	
Quarter	Time	Plays	Yards	TOP	Team	Scoring information	Lindenwood Lions	Sioux Falls Cougars
1	0:54	13	68	6:00	Sioux Falls Cougars	41-yard field goal by Braden Wieking	0	3
1	0:42	-	-	-	Sioux Falls Cougars	Philip Staback tackled in end zone for a safety by Team	0	5
2	12:11	6	24	3:31	Sioux Falls Cougars	37-yard field goal by Braden Wieking	0	8
2	7:30	10	78	4:41	Lindenwood Lions	Matt Bramow 19-yard touchdown reception from Philip Staback, Halley Ferrell kick Good	7	8
2	7:30	3	54	1:16	Lindenwood Lions	Matt Bramow 9-yard touchdown reception from Philip Staback, Halley Ferrell kick Good	14	8
3	14:44	-	-	-	Sioux Falls Cougars	Adam Lopez 91 yard Kickoff Return Touchdown, Braden Wieking Kick Good	14	15
3	11:39	6	63	3:05	Lindenwood Lions	Denodus O'Bryant 45-yard touchdown run, 2-point Philip Staback Rush Good	22	15
3	9:45	3	26	1:54	Sioux Falls Cougars	Ryan Lowmiller 2-yard touchdown run, Braden Wieking kick Good	22	22
4	9:50	8	28	3:33	Sioux Falls Cougars	42-yard field goal by Braden Wieking	22	25
"TOP" = time of possession. For other American football terms, see Glossary of American football.							Lindenwood Lions	Sioux Falls Cougars

== Tournament bracket ==
1st Round; November 21
1	Sioux Falls (SD) (11–0)	63
14	Minot State (8–2)	21
7	Morningside (IA) (9–1)	24
11	Missouri Valley (8–2)	6
4	Saint Xavier (IL) (11–0)	52
9	McKendree (IL) (9–1)	28
6	Lambuth (TN) (11–0)	38
10	Cumberlands (KY) (9–1)	7
2	Carroll (MT) (11–0)	59
17	Dickinson State (7–3)	7
8	MidAmerica Nazarene (9–1)	40
12	McPherson (KS) (9–1)	24
3	Lindenwood (MO) (10–0)	49
20	Langston (OK) (7–3)	14
5	Ottawa (KS) (10–0)	40
13	Hastings (NE) (9–2)	34

Quarterfinals; November 28
1	Sioux Falls (SD)	49
7	Morningside (IA)	21
4	Saint Xavier (IL)	52
6	Lambuth (TN)	10
2	Carroll (MT)	34
8	MidAmerica Nazarene	13
3	Lindenwood (MO)	64
5	Ottawa (KS)	26

Semifinals; December 5
1	Sioux Falls (SD)	48
4	Saint Xavier (IL)	6
2	Carroll (MT)	35
3	Lindenwood (MO)	42

Championship; December 19
1	Sioux Falls (SD)	25
3	Lindenwood (MO)	22

- * denotes OT.
