= Dan Kratzer =

American football player and coach (born 1949)

Biographical details
- Born: July 7, 1949 (age 77); Kearney, Missouri, U.S.
- Education: Central Missouri State

Playing career
- 1968–1969: Northern Arizona
- 1970–1971: Missouri Valley
- 1973: Kansas City Chiefs
- Position: Wide receiver

Coaching career (HC unless noted)
- 1974: Missouri Valley (assistant)
- 1975: Kearney HS (MO) (assistant)
- 1976–1977: Trenton HS (MO)
- 1978–1982: Lee's Summit HS (MO)
- 1983: Indiana (assistant)
- 1984–1985: Ohio Northern
- 1986: Miami (OH) (assistant)
- 1987: Richmond HS (MO)
- 1988–1989: Missouri Valley (OC)
- 1990–1994: Hastings
- 1995–2000: Lindenwood
- 2001–2004: Kent State (assistant)
- 2005–2011: South Dakota Mines

Head coaching record
- Overall: 90–116–1 (college)
- Tournaments: 1–3 (NAIA D-II playoffs); 0–1 (NAIA playoffs)

Accomplishments and honors

Championships
- 2 Nebraska-Iowa (1991–1992)

Daniel Leon Kratzer (born July 7, 1949) is an American former professional football player and college coach. He played as a wide receiver for the Kansas City Chiefs of the National Football League (NFL). Kratzer served as the head football coach at Ohio Northern (1984–1985), Hastings (1990–1994), Lindenwood (1995–2000), and South Dakota Mines (2005–2011), compiling a career college football coaching record of 90–116–1.

== Playing career ==
Kratzer, a wide receiver, played high school football in Lathrop, Missouri before playing college football for the Northern Arizona Lumberjacks and Missouri Valley in the early 1970. Kratzer holds the NAIA record for average yards per catch for a season with 30.63, on 30 catches for 919 yards, set in 1970.

Professionally, he was an eighth round draft pick of the Cincinnati Bengals in the 1972 NFL draft, but did not play for them; he only played in a single game in 1973 for the Kansas City Chiefs.

== Coaching career ==
Kratzer was an assistant under Sam Wyche at Indiana University Bloomington in 1983 before being named the head football coach at Ohio Northern University. He later was the third head football coach at Lindenwood located in St. Charles, Missouri, and he held that position for six seasons, from 1995 until 2000. His overall coaching record at Lindenwood was 29–35. Prior to that, he also served as head coach for three Missouri high schools for seven total seasons, head coach at Ohio Northern for two seasons, earned two conference championships during his five years at Hastings. His longest tenure was his last serving as head coach at the South Dakota School of Mines for seven years, ending in 2011 and marking SDSM&T's transition to NCAA Division II.

== Head coaching record ==
=== College ===
Year	Team	Overall	Conference	Standing	Bowl/playoffs	NAIA^{#}
Ohio Northern Polar Bears (Ohio Athletic Conference) (1984–1985)
1984	Ohio Northern	2–6–1	2–5–1	7th		
1985	Ohio Northern	1–9	1–7	8th		
Ohio Northern:		3–15–1	3–12–1			
Hastings Broncos (Nebraska-Iowa Athletic Conference) (1990–1994)
1990	Hastings	3–6	3–2	3rd		
1991	Hastings	8–4	5–0	1st	L NAIA Division II Quarterfinal	
1992	Hastings	8–3	6–0	1st	L NAIA Division II First Round	
1993	Hastings	9–2	5–1	2nd	L NAIA Division II First Round	
1994	Hastings	7–3	4–2	3rd		
Hastings:		35–18	23–5			
Lindenwood Lions (Mid-States Football Association) (1995)
1995	Lindenwood	4–7	2–3			
Lindenwood Lions (Heart of America Athletic Conference) (1996–2000)
1996	Lindenwood	4–6	3–6	7th		
1997	Lindenwood	4–6	4–5	T–6th		
1998	Lindenwood	8–3	7–2	2nd	L NAIA First Round	16
1999	Lindenwood	5–5	5–4	T–5th		
2000	Lindenwood	4–8	4–5	5th		
Lindenwood:		29–35	25–25			
South Dakota Mines Hardrockers (Dakota Athletic Conference) (2005–2010)
2005	South Dakota Mines	1–9	1–6	8th		
2006	South Dakota Mines	1–9	0–6	8th		
2007	South Dakota Mines	3–7	1–6	T–7th		
2008	South Dakota Mines	5–5	3–4	T–5th		
2009	South Dakota Mines	5–5	3–5	T–5th		
2010	South Dakota Mines	7–3	6–2	T–2nd		
South Dakota Mines Hardrockers (NCAA Division II independent) (2011)
2011	South Dakota Mines	1–10				
South Dakota Mines:		23–48	14–29			
Total:		90–116–1				
National championship Conference title Conference division title or championship game berth
