= Jonathan Harris (American football) =

American football player (born 1995)

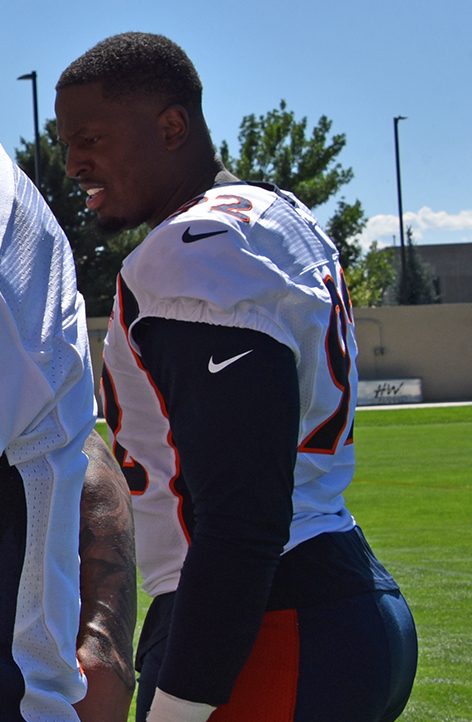
- Harris with the Denver Broncos in 2023

Profile
- Position: Defensive end

Personal information
- Born: August 4, 1996 (age 30); Aurora, Illinois, U.S.
- Listed height: 6 ft 5 in (1.96 m)
- Listed weight: 295 lb (134 kg)

Career information
- High school: Waubonsie Valley (Aurora)
- College: Lindenwood (2014–2018)
- NFL draft: 2019: undrafted

Career history
- Chicago Bears (2019); Denver Broncos (2019–2023); Miami Dolphins (2024)*; Carolina Panthers (2024); Minnesota Vikings (2024–2026)*
- * Offseason or practice squad member only

Awards and highlights
- 2× First-team All-MIAA (2017, 2018)

Career NFL statistics as of 2024
- Total tackles: 91
- Sacks: 1.0
- Fumble recoveries: 1
- Stats at Pro Football Reference

Jonathan Harris (born August 4, 1996) is an American professional football defensive end. He played college football for the Lindenwood Lions.

== College career ==
Harris was a member of the Lindenwood Lions, redshirting his true freshman season. He finished his collegiate career with 183 tackles (38.5 for loss), 22 sacks, four forced fumbles, an interception and a fumble recovery.

== Professional career ==
Pre-draft measurables
Height	Weight	Arm length	Hand span	Wingspan	40-yard dash	10-yard split	20-yard split	20-yard shuttle	Three-cone drill	Vertical jump	Broad jump	Bench press
6 ft 4 1/2 in (1.94 m)	282 lb (128 kg)	33 5/8 in (0.85 m)	9 1/2 in (0.24 m)	6 ft 9 5/8 in (2.07 m)	5.20 s	1.80 s	2.95 s	4.81 s	7.46 s	31.0 in (0.79 m)	8 ft 11 in (2.72 m)	22 reps
All values from Pro Day

=== Chicago Bears ===
Harris signed with the Chicago Bears as an undrafted free agent on May 3, 2019. He was waived on August 31, 2019, during final roster cuts but was re-signed to the Bears' practice squad the following day. Harris was promoted to the Bears active roster on September 28, 2019. Harris made his NFL debut on September 29, 2019, against the Minnesota Vikings. He was waived on October 22.

=== Denver Broncos ===
On October 23, 2019, Harris was claimed off waivers by the Denver Broncos. He was waived with a non-football illness designation on August 12, 2020, and reverted to the team's reserve/non-football illness list after clearing waivers the next day.

On September 1, 2021, Harris was waived by the Broncos and re-signed to the practice squad. He was promoted to the active roster on January 3, 2022.

On August 30, 2022, Harris was waived by the Broncos and signed to the practice squad the next day. He was promoted to the active roster on November 15.

=== Miami Dolphins ===
On March 18, 2024, Harris signed a one-year contract with the Miami Dolphins He was released on August 28, and re-signed to the practice squad.

=== Carolina Panthers ===
On October 22, 2024, Harris was signed by the Carolina Panthers off the Dolphins practice squad. He was waived on December 23.

=== Minnesota Vikings ===
On December 26, 2024, Harris was signed to the Minnesota Vikings practice squad. He signed a reserve/future contract on January 16, 2025.

On August 26, 2025, Harris was released by the Vikings as part of final roster cuts. He was signed to the practice squad the next day and he spent the whole season there.

On August 24, 2026, Harris re-signed with the Vikings. On August 30, he was released by the Vikings as a part of final roster cuts. On September 23, Harris was signed to the Vikings practice squad. On September 29, he was released from the Vikings practice squad.
