= Connor Harris =

American football player (born 1993)

No. 47, 59
- Position: Linebacker

Personal information
- Born: June 22, 1993 (age 33); Lee's Summit, Missouri, U.S.
- Listed height: 5 ft 11 in (1.80 m)
- Listed weight: 242 lb (110 kg)

Career information
- High school: Blue Springs South (Blue Springs, Missouri)
- College: Lindenwood
- NFL draft: 2017: undrafted

Career history
- New York Jets (2017)*; Arizona Cardinals (2017)*; Cincinnati Bengals (2017–2018)*
- * Offseason or practice squad member only

Connor Harris (born June 22, 1993) is an American former football linebacker. He played college football at Lindenwood.

== Early life ==
Harris was named the 2011 Missouri 6A Defensive Player of the Year and 2011 Kansas City Star Player of the Year in high school. He was also selected to the first-team all-state as a safety in 2011.

== College career ==
Harris won the 2016 Cliff Harris Award and was named to the AFCA first-team All-American in his senior season (three time All-American throughout college career). Harris recorded an NCAA all-time record 633 tackles in 48 games at Lindenwood University.

== Professional career ==
=== New York Jets ===
Harris signed with the New York Jets as an undrafted free agent on May 5, 2017. He was waived on September 2, 2017.

=== Arizona Cardinals ===
On October 3, 2017, Harris was signed to the Arizona Cardinals' practice squad. He was released on November 27, 2017.

=== Cincinnati Bengals ===
On December 20, 2017, Harris was signed to the Cincinnati Bengals' practice squad. He signed a reserve/future contract with the Bengals on January 1, 2018. He was waived by the Bengals on April 30, 2018.
