= Brian Schaefering =

American football player (born 1983)

No. 91, 66
- Position: Defensive end

Personal information
- Born: August 20, 1983 (age 43); St. Louis, Missouri, U.S.
- Listed height: 6 ft 4 in (1.93 m)
- Listed weight: 295 lb (134 kg)

Career information
- High school: Hazelwood East (St. Louis)
- College: Lindenwood
- NFL draft: 2008: undrafted

Career history
- Cleveland Browns (2008)*; New York Jets (2008−2009)*; Cleveland Browns (2009−2011); Dallas Cowboys (2012)
- * Offseason or practice squad member only

Career NFL statistics
- Total tackles: 75
- Sacks: 2.0
- Stats at Pro Football Reference

Brian Schaefering (born August 20, 1983) is an American former professional football player who was a defensive end in the National Football League (NFL) for the Cleveland Browns and Dallas Cowboys. He played college football for the Illinois Fighting Illini and Lindenwood Lions.

== Early life ==
Schaefering earned three football varsity letters at Hazelwood East High School in St. Louis and was also First-team All-State, two-time First-team All-Suburban North and first-team North District selection and Two-time All-Conference selection.

He had seven quarterback sacks, 130 tackles and two interceptions as a senior. He posted 60 tackles and six blocked punts as a junior and served as the team's punter. He also earned letters in track.

== College career ==
Schaefering started his college football career with the Illinois Fighting Illini. In 2001, he played the final nine games of the season along the defensive line as a true freshman and finished the season with eight tackles and one sack.

In 2002, he played in all 12 games, earning two starts and finished the season with a team third best of four sacks and a team fifth best with five tackles-for-loss (TFL). He registered 34 tackles on the season. During the 2003 season, he took a medical redshirted due to a shoulder injury. He appeared in 8 games for Illinois in 2004 totaling 19 tackles, one sack and two forced fumbles.

He did not play in 2005 and 2006 while sitting out during his school transfer. Schaefering played at Lindenwood University in St. Charles, Missouri for his senior year in 2007, after transferring from the Fighting Illini. He led the team with 7.5 sacks and also recorded 37 tackles, including 19 solo tackles, 9.5 TFL, one recovered fumble and one blocked kick during 2007, while helping Lindenwood to the NAIA National Football Championship series.

== Professional career ==
Schaefering was 6-4¾ and weighed 286 when measured at his NFL Pro Day workout and ran a 4.85 forty-yard dash and did 18 reps of 225 pounds, and a 34½ vertical jump.

He was signed by the Cleveland Browns as an undrafted free agent on May 1, 2008. He was waived on August 26. Schaefering was signed by the New York Jets on December 18, 2008. He was waived on December 29 before being re-signed to a future deal on January 1, 2009. He was waived again on June 9.

Schaefering was re-signed by the Cleveland Browns on August 25, 2009, after wide receiver and former Jets teammate Paul Raymond was waived. Schaefering was promoted to the active roster on December 2, when Shaun Rogers was put on the injured reserve list. Schaefering finished the 2009 regular season with 12 tackles and 1.5 sacks. He was cut on September 1, 2012. He finished his Browns career after appearing in 37 games, while posting 72 tackles and 2 sacks from his nose tackle position.

On December 12, 2012, he was signed by the Dallas Cowboys, reuniting with defensive coordinator Rob Ryan who held the same position when Schaefering was with the Cleveland Browns. He was signed to replace Josh Brent, who left the team to focus on the charges he was facing for the death of Jerry Brown. Schaefering was not re-signed after the season.

== Personal life ==
After football, he was diagnosed with traumatic brain injury (TBI) and the possibility of also having chronic traumatic encephalopathy (CTE).
