= Patrick Ross =

American football coach

Current position
- Title: General manager of football operations
- Team: Graceland
- Conference: HAAC

Biographical details
- Education: University of Puget Sound

Playing career
- 1993–1996: Puget Sound
- Position: Defensive back

Coaching career (HC unless noted)
- 1998: Kansas Wesleyan (DB)
- 1999–2001: Kansas Wesleyan (DC)
- 2002–2003: Ottawa (KS)
- 2004–2016: Lindenwood
- 2022–2024: Graceland

Administrative career (AD unless noted)
- 2025–present: Graceland (GM)

Head coaching record
- Overall: 124–79
- Tournaments: 5–6 (NAIA playoffs)

Accomplishments and honors

Championships
- 1 KCAC (2003); 4 HAAC (2004, 2007, 2009, 2010)

Patrick Ross is an American college football coach. He has been the general manager of football operations for Graceland University since 2025, where he was the head coach at from 2022 to 2024. Ross previously served as the head football coach at Ottawa University in Ottawa, Kansas from 2002 to 2003 and at Lindenwood University in St. Charles, Missouri from 2004 to 2016.

== Coaching career ==
=== Ottawa (KS) ===
Ross served as the head football coach at Ottawa University in Ottawa, Kansas for two seasons, from 2002 to 2003, compiling a 14–7 record.

=== Lindenwood ===
Ross was the fifth head football coach at Lindenwood University in St. Charles, Missouri, serving from 2004 to 2016. His record at Lindenwood was 93–57.

=== Graceland ===
On December 23, 2021, Ross was hired as the thirteenth head football coach in school history for Graceland University. His record at Graceland was 17–16.

He was hired as the general manager of football operations at Graceland on July 31, 2025.

== Head coaching record ==
| Year | Team | Overall | Conference | Standing | Bowl/playoffs |
|---|---|---|---|---|---|
Ottawa Braves (Kansas Collegiate Athletic Conference) (2002–2003)
| 2002 | Ottawa | 5–4 | 5–4 | T–3rd | |
| 2003 | Ottawa | 9–2 | 9–0 | 1st | L NAIA First Round |
| Ottawa: | | 14–6 | 14–4 | | |
Lindenwood Lions (Heart of America Athletic Conference) (2004–2010)
| 2004 | Lindenwood | 11–1 | 10–0 | 1st | L NAIA First Round |
| 2005 | Lindenwood | 7–4 | 7–3 | T–3rd | |
| 2006 | Lindenwood | 5–7 | 5–5 | T–5th | |
| 2007 | Lindenwood | 10–2 | 9–1 | 1st | L NAIA First Round |
| 2008 | Lindenwood | 11–2 | 9–1 | 2nd | L NAIA Semifinal |
| 2009 | Lindenwood | 13–1 | 10–0 | 1st | L NAIA Championship |
| 2010 | Lindenwood | 9–2 | 9–1 | 2nd | L NAIA First Round |
Lindenwood Lions (NCAA Division II independent) (2011)
| 2011 | Lindenwood | 8–3 | | | |
Lindenwood Lions (Mid-America Intercollegiate Athletics Association) (2012–2016)
| 2012 | Lindenwood | 8–4 | 7–3 | T–4th | |
| 2013 | Lindenwood | 3–6 | 2–6 | 10th | |
| 2014 | Lindenwood | 2–9 | 2–9 | 11th | |
| 2015 | Lindenwood | 3–8 | 3–8 | T–9th | |
| 2016 | Lindenwood | 3–8 | 3–8 | T–8th | |
| Lindenwood: | | 93–57 | 76–45 | | |
Graceland Yellowjackets (Heart of America Athletic Conference) (2022–2024)
| 2022 | Graceland | 4–7 | 2–3 | 4th (North) | |
| 2023 | Graceland | 6–5 | 3–2 | T–2nd (North) | |
| 2024 | Graceland | 7–4 | 5–1 | 2nd (North) | |
| Graceland: | | 17–16 | 10–6 | | |
| Total: | | 124–79 | | | |
