= Rick Gorzynski =

American football player and coach

Playing career
- 1965–1967: Northeast Missouri State
- Position: Quarterback

Coaching career (HC unless noted)
- 1968–1973: Hazelwood Central HS (MO)
- 1974–2000: Hazelwood East HS (MO)
- 2001–2003: Lindenwood

Head coaching record
- Overall: 7–26 (college); 223–53 (high school)

Rick Gorzynski is an American former football coach. He serve as the fourth head football coach at Lindenwood University in St. Charles, Missouri and he held that position for three seasons, from 2001 until 2003. His record at Lindenwood was 7–26.

== Head coaching record ==
=== College ===
Year	Team	Overall	Conference	Standing	Bowl/playoffs
Lindenwood Lions (Heart of America Athletic Conference) (2001–2003)
2001	Lindenwood	3–8	3–7	9th	
2002	Lindenwood	1–10	1–9	10th	
2003	Lindenwood	3–8	2–8	T–10th	
Lindenwood:		7–26	6–24		
Total:		7–26			
