= Jeff Driskill =

American football coach

Coaching career (HC unless noted)
- 1992–1994: Lindenwood

Head coaching record
- Overall: 6–24–1

Jeff Driskill is an American former football coach. He served as the second head football coach at Lindenwood University in St. Charles, Missouri and he held that position for three seasons, from 1992 until 1994. His record at Lindenwood was 6–24–1.

== Head coaching record ==
Year	Team	Overall	Conference	Standing	Bowl/playoffs
Lindenwood Lions (NAIA Division II independent) (1992–1993)
1992	Lindenwood	1–9			
1993	Lindenwood	2–8–1			
Lindenwood Lions (Mid-States Football Association) (1994)
1994	Lindenwood	2–8	0–5	6th	
Lindenwood:		5–25–1	0–5		
Total:		5–25–1			
