= Jed Stugart =

American football player and coach (born 1970)

Current position
- Title: Head coach
- Team: Lindenwood
- Conference: OVC–Big South
- Record: 44–39

Biographical details
- Born: March 4, 1970 (age 56); Greeley, Colorado, U.S.

Playing career
- 1991–1992: Azusa Pacific
- Position: Linebacker

Coaching career (HC unless noted)
- 1999–2002: Northern Colorado (DL/LB)
- 2003–2005: Northern Colorado (DC)
- 2006–2008: MidAmerica Nazarene
- 2009: UNLV (LB)
- 2010–2016: Sioux Falls
- 2017–present: Lindenwood

Head coaching record
- Overall: 135–63
- Bowls: 1–0
- Tournaments: 3–3 (NAIA playoffs); 2–4 (NCAA D-II playoffs)

Accomplishments and honors

Championships
- 1 HAAC (2008); 1 GPAC (2010); 1 NSIC (2016); 2 GLVC (2019, 2021)

Awards
- NCIS Coach of the Year (2016)

Jed Lance Stugart (born March 4, 1970) is an American college football coach and former player. He is currently the head football coach at Lindenwood University in St. Charles, Missouri, a position he assumed after the 2016 season. Prior to that, he spent seven seasons as the head football coach at the University of Sioux Falls (2010–2016) and three years in the same position at MidAmerica Nazarene University (2006–2008).

A native of Greeley, Colorado, Stugart played football as a linebacker at Azusa Pacific University. During the 1990s he pursued a country music career in Nashville, Tennessee. Performing as Jed Lance, he opened for Lonestar, the Nitty Gritty Dirt Band, and Tim McGraw. Stugart returned to Greeley in the late 1990s and volunteered as a high school football coach. Joe Glenn, then head football coach at the University of Northern Colorado, hired Stugart to join his staff as a volunteer. Stugart later became a graduate assistant at Northern Colorado before being promoted to defensive coordinator in 2003.

== Head coaching record ==
Year	Team	Overall	Conference	Standing	Bowl/playoffs	NAIA^{#}
MidAmerica Nazarene Pioneers (Heart of America Athletic Conference) (2006–2008)
2006	MidAmerica Nazarene	7–3	7–3	T–2nd		22
2007	MidAmerica Nazarene	9–3	8–2	T–2nd	L NAIA First Round	13
2008	MidAmerica Nazarene	10–1	10–0	1st	L NAIA First Round	8
MidAmerica Nazarene:		26–7	25–5			
Sioux Falls Cougars (Great Plains Athletic Conference) (2010)
2010	Sioux Falls	13–1	10–0	1st	L NAIA Championship	2
Sioux Falls Cougars (NCAA Division II independent) (2011)
2011	Sioux Falls	5–4				
Sioux Falls Cougars (Northern Sun Intercollegiate Conference) (2012–2016)
2012	Sioux Falls	9–2	9–2 / 5–2	T–2nd / 3rd (South)		
2013	Sioux Falls	6–5	6–5 / 4–3	T–5th / T–3rd (South)		
2014	Sioux Falls	11–1	10–1 / 6–1	3rd / 2nd (South)	W Mineral Water	18
2015	Sioux Falls	9–3	9–2 / 5–2	T–2nd / 3rd (South)	L NCAA Division II First Round	22
2016	Sioux Falls	12–1	11–0 / 7–0	1st / 1st (South)	L NCAA Division II Second Round	8
Sioux Falls:		65–17	55–10			
Lindenwood Lions (Mid-America Intercollegiate Athletics Association) (2017–2018)
2017	Lindenwood	4–7	4–7	T–8th		
2018	Lindenwood	4–7	4–7	10th		
Lindenwood Lions (Great Lakes Valley Conference) (2019–2021)
2019	Lindenwood	9–4	7–0	1st	L NCAA Division II Second Round	25
2020–21	No team—COVID-19					
2021	Lindenwood	9–3	7–0	1st	L NCAA Division II First Round	
Lindenwood Lions (Ohio Valley Conference) (2022)
2022	Lindenwood	7–3	2–3	T–3rd		
Lindenwood Lions (Big South–OVC Football Association) (2023–present)
2023	Lindenwood	3–7	1–5	10th		
2024	Lindenwood	5–7	4–4	5th		
2025	Lindenwood	6–6	5–3	T–3rd		
Lindenwood:		44–39	32–27			
Total:		135–63				
National championship Conference title Conference division title or championship game berth
