= David Schroeder (American football) =

American football coach

Biographical details
- Born: 1937 (age 88–89)

Coaching career (HC unless noted)
- 1964–1965: Juneau HS (WI)
- 1966–1976: Greenwood HS (WI)
- 1977: Medford Area Senior HS (WI)
- 1978–1982: Sioux Falls
- 1983–1988: Evangel
- 1990–1991: Lindenwood
- 1992–1995: Westmar

Head coaching record
- Overall: 72–94–3 (college); 88–37 (high school)
- Tournaments: 0–3 (NAIA D-II playoffs) (Note: Evangel finished the 1988 season with an overall record of record 11–1, winning the Heart of America Athletic Conference (HAAC) championship with a 7–0 mark. In March 1989, they forfeited all 11 wins, including two in the 1988 NAIA Division II Football National Championship playoffs, and their HAAC title because they had used two ineligible players.)

Accomplishments and honors

Championships
- 1 SDIC (1981)

David M. Schroeder (born 1937) is an American former football coach. He served as the head football coach at Sioux Falls College—now known as the University of Sioux Falls—from 1978 to 1982, Evangel College—now known as Evangel University—from 1983 to 1988, Lindenwood University from 1990 to 1991, and Westmar University from 1992 to 1995, compiling a career college football coaching record of 72–94–3. Schroeder was the first head football coach at Lindenwood, serving for two seasons, from 1990 to 1991, and tallying a mark of 11–8–1. He resigned from his post at Westmar in December 1995 to join his wife in St. Charles, Missouri. Schroeder graduated from Wisconsin State College–Stevens Point—now known as the University of Wisconsin–Stevens Point—with a bachelor's degree in 1964 and earned a master's degree at the Northern Michigan University in 1971.

== Head coaching record ==
=== College ===
Year	Team	Overall	Conference	Standing	Bowl/playoffs
Sioux Falls Cougars (South Dakota Intercollegiate Conference) (1978–1982)
1978	Sioux Falls	1–9	0–6	7th	
1979	Sioux Falls	3–7	3–3	4th	
1980	Sioux Falls	5–5	4–2	3rd	
1981	Sioux Falls	6–3–1	5–1	T–1st	
1982	Sioux Falls	9–1	6–1	2nd	
Sioux Falls:		24–25–1	18–13		
Evangel Crusaders (NAIA Division II independent) (1983–1987)
1983	Evangel	2–8			
1984	Evangel	5–4			
1985	Evangel	4–6			
1986	Evangel	6–4			
1987	Evangel	5–4–1			
Evangel Crusaders (Heart of America Athletic Conference) (1988)
1988	Evangel	0–12	0–7	8th	L NAIA Division II Semifinal
Evangel:		22–38–1	0–7		
Lindenwood Lions (NAIA Division II independent) (1990–1991)
1990	Lindenwood	6–4			
1991	Lindenwood	5–4–1			
Westmar Eagles (NAIA Division II independent) (1992)
1992	Westmar	1–8			
Westmar Eagles (NAIA Division I independent) (1993–1995)
1993	Westmar	4–6			
1994	Westmar	4–5			
1995	Westmar	6–4			
Westmar:		15–23			
Total:		72–94–3			
National championship Conference title Conference division title or championship game berth
