= Lindenwood Lions football =

Intercollegiate team based in St. Charles, Missouri

2026 Lindenwood Lions football team
- First season: 1990; 36 years ago
- Head coach: Jed Stugart; 9th season, 44–39 (.530)
- Location: St. Charles, Missouri
- Stadium: Harlen C. Hunter Stadium (capacity: 7,450)
- NCAA division: Division I FCS
- Conference: Ohio Valley
- Colors: Black and gold
- All-time record: 192–195–2 (.496)
- Bowl record: 5–7 (.417)

Conference championships
- HAAC: 2004, 2007, 2009 GLVC: 2019, 2021
- Consensus All-Americans: 4
- Marching band: Golden Lion Marching Band
- Outfitter: Under Armour
- Website: Official website

The Lindenwood Lions football team represents Lindenwood University in football. Lindenwood is a member of the Ohio Valley Conference (OVC). The Lions were provisional members of the NCAA Division I FCS for the 2022 season before becoming an active member during the 2023–24 academic year.

Lindenwood was previously a member of the NAIA and played in the Heart of America Athletic Conference (HAAC) from 1996 to 2010. The Lions play in Harlen C. Hunter Stadium on the campus of Lindenwood University in St. Charles, Missouri, which has a seating capacity of 7,450.

== History ==
=== Early history and NAIA years ===
Lindenwood University football began in 1990 under head coach David Schroeder. LU competed as an independent for the first four seasons. The program's first win came in the first ever football for the university on September 8, 1990, when the Lions defeated Dana College. The Lions finished the inaugural season with a record of 6–4.

Despite a 3–5–0 start to the first half of the 1991 season, a program highlight came on October 12, 1991, when Lindenwood tied 17–17 on the road in Birmingham, Alabama with NCAA Division III Alabama-Birmingham before the UAB program upgraded to NCAA Division I. Following that game, the Lions lost the following game to Benedictine College but finished the season with a three-game win streak to finish the season 5–4–1. During the next several years of the football program, bright spots began to emerge, a couple of the original players from the first team ever at the school were named to the All American team. Hoyt Gregory made all American in 1992 and two players from the original football class Steve Pinkerton and Jim Paddock were signed and drafted into professional football. This gave the program the status that it could recruit and maintain top level athletes.

Jeff Driskill became the second coach in program history in 1992. In 1994 Lindenwood became one of the founding members of the Mid-States Football Association along with five schools from Illinois, Indiana, and Ohio. After three 2-win seasons Dan Kratzer took over the program and lead the Lions to a 4–7–0 season in 1995.

In 1996 the program became a member of the Heart of America Athletic Conference. The Lions recorded back-to-back 4–6–0 seasons in 1996 and 1997. In 1998 the program saw drastic improvement when Kratzer lead the lions to an 8–2–0 regular season. Including a 34–33 win against NCAA Division I-AA Butler. The win marked the first and only win over an NCAA DI-AA opponent, as LU lost 16–27 to Butler in 1997 and 6–27 to Valparaiso University in 2002. The 1996 also marked the first time Lindenwood football received a bid to the NAIA Playoffs before losing in the first round 10–12 to Southwestern College. In 2000 Kratzer lead the Lions to their first of two bowl appearances, when the Lions received a bid to the Wheat Bowl – NAIA Kickoff Classic against Concordia University (Nebraska).

Rick Gorzynski became the fourth coach in program history in 2001 and after three sub .500 season in which the Lions recorded two 3–8–0 seasons and a 1–10–0 season, Patrick Ross became the fifth football coach in Lindenwood history. Ross quickly turned the program around from a 3–8–0 season in 2003 to an 11–1–0 season in his first as LU head coach in 2004. The Lions also won their first HAAC Championship after an 11–0–0 regular season, the only loss, a 19–20 loss in the opening round of the NAIA Playoffs to Hastings College.

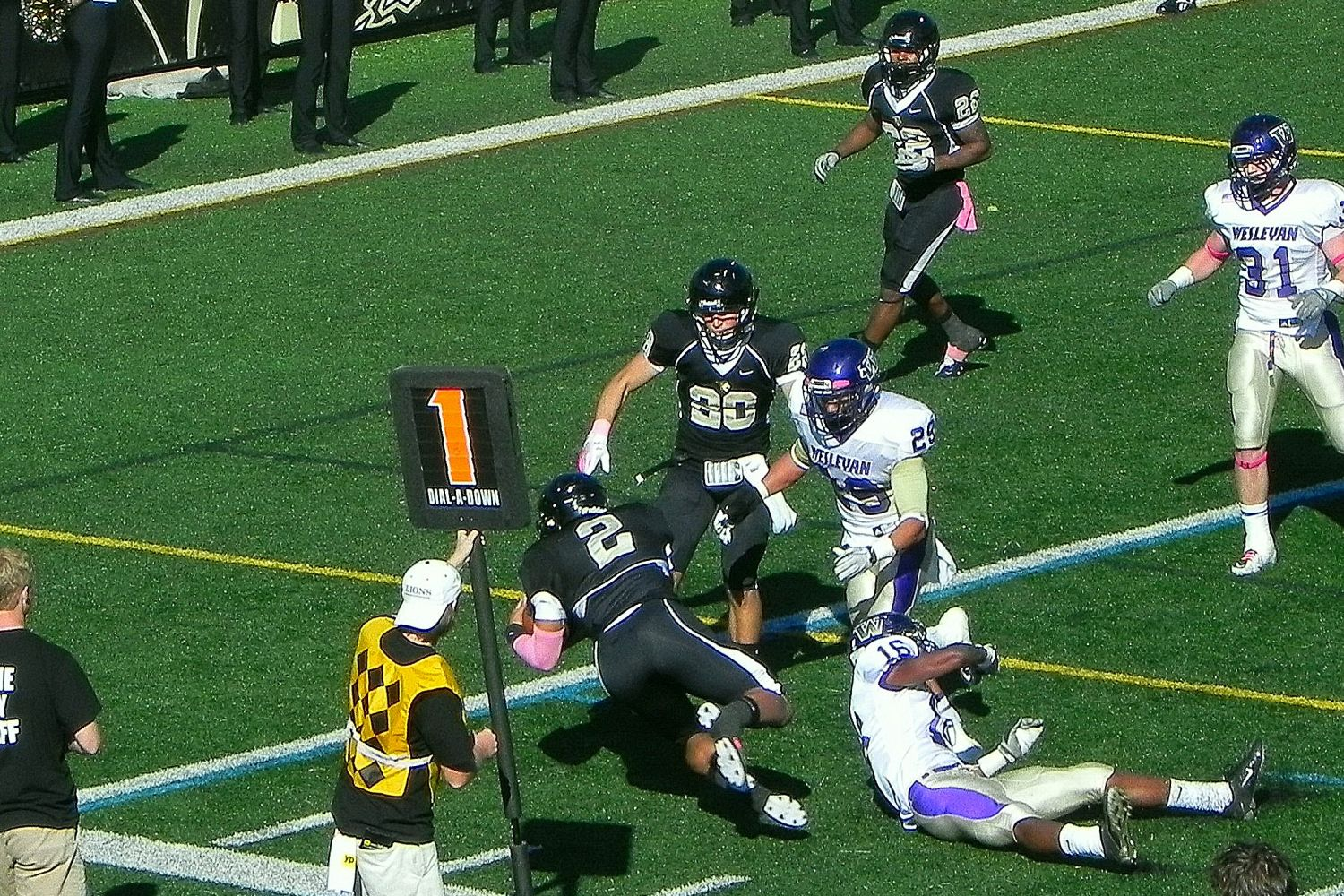
Quarterback, David Ortega, dives toward the goal line in a game against Kansas Wesleyan.

Under Ross the Lions recorded their first playoff win in program history in the 2008 when the Lions defeated Lambuth University 65–48. That same season Lindenwood advanced to the NAIA Semifinal Game with a quarterfinal 34–31 win over Morningside College. Lindenwood would eventually be defeated by the defending NAIA national championsCarroll College in the semifinal game 37–38.

In 2009, Ross lead to become the HAAC Champions for the third-straight season. The Lions entered the 2009 NAIA Playoffs and won 42–14 over Langston University. In the second-round game Lindenwood defeated Ottawa University (KS) to reach the semifinal game where LU again faced Carroll College.

Lindenwood defeated the Carroll Fighting Saints 42–35 to reach the NAIA Football National Championship for the team's first and only appearance. LU became the NAIA national runner-up in 2009 after a 22–25 loss to University of Sioux Falls Cougars and came into the 2010 season ranked #2 in the nation in 2010 NAIA Football Coaches' Top 25 Spring Poll.

In June 2010 LU applied to join the NCAA Division II Mid-America Intercollegiate Athletics Association (MIAA), as part of the conference's expansion from 12 to 16 members for 2012. Lindenwood was approved for membership into the MIAA on September 24, 2010, with the affiliation taking place in 2012–2013 school year.

Under Ross the Lions set a school offensive record with a 90–19 week 7 win over Culver-Stockton. Lindenwood also moved from fifth to first in average offensive points in all of college football with a 56.5 scoring average. In the NAIA, Saint Xavier ranked second with 52.6 and the only NCAA program scoring over 50 is Oregon with 54.3. In that win Lindenwood set school offensive records with 721 yards of total offense, second in program history, record 376 rushing yards, and record 8 rushing touchdowns.

Despite only losing one close game in the regular season to MidAmerica Nazarene University 20–26 on September 25, 2010, Lindenwood Football suffered a 38–46 loss at home in the first round of the NAIA Football Championship Series to the University of Saint Francis. LU finished the 2010 season 9–2 overall, ranked 1st in scoring with an average of 52.5 points per game and 1st in total offensive yards with an average of 551.5 yards per game. Senior quarterback Philip Staback finished the season ranked 1st in pass efficiency and total passing yards per game.

=== Recent history, move to the NCAA ===
MIAA logo in Lindenwood's colors

As part of the transition to Division II, the 2010 schedule would be the last NAIA schedule played by Lions Football, as it was announced the Lions will play an independent schedule of NCAA Division I FCS, Division II, and NAIA schools. Lindenwood opened the 2011 on the road at Northern Colorado when kicker, James Neal kicked a 21-yard fieldgoal as time expired to win the game. The win was the programs first over a Division I football team since Lindenwood defeated NCAA Division I-AA (now FCS) Butler 34–33 in 1998. The team then returned the 2011 home opener that saw the Lions beat former conference and NAIA rival, Graceland 67–10. The win marked the ninth straight home opener win and improved the program to a 16–6 all-time record on home openers. In the third game of the season, saw Lindenwood play against its first Division II opponent; in which the Lions defeated Saint Joseph's (IN) 55–14. After back-to-back losses, including 21st ranked Division I FCS South Dakota, Lindenwood rebounded with four straight wins. The winning streak was the longest of the season and included a 41–35 win over perennial Division II power, Texas A&M–Kingsville. The team finished the season splitting wins against two future MIAA rivals, when the team lost to Central Missouri 28–47 in the final home contest of the season; followed by a 48–14 win on the road to end the season at Central Oklahoma.

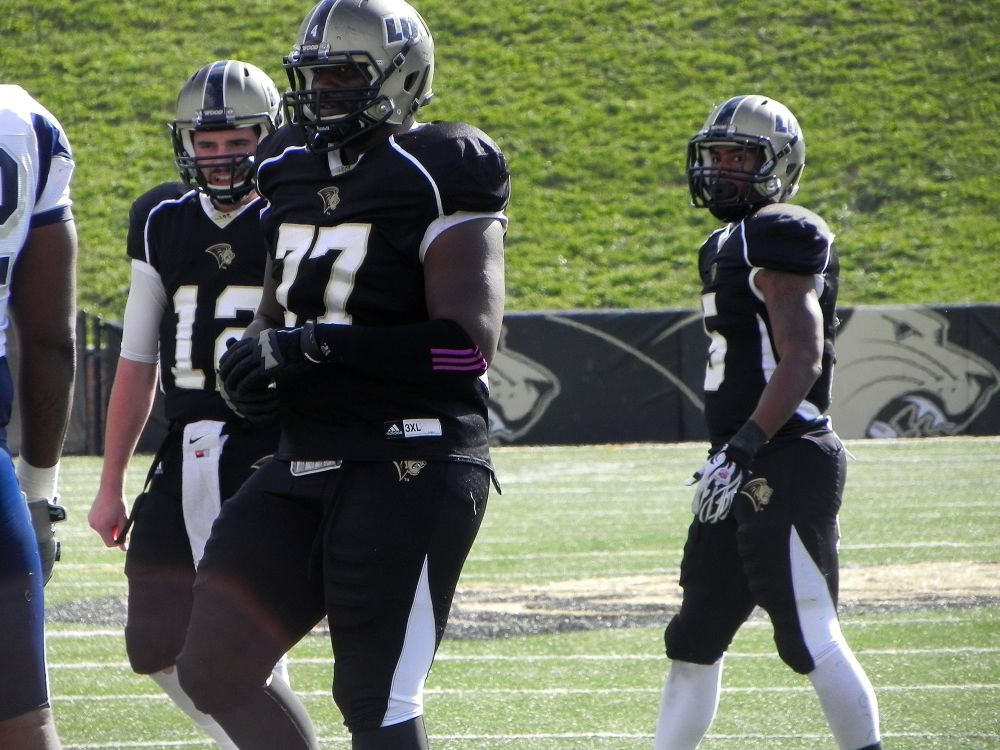
Lindenwood Football players in a game against Washburn University.

Lindenwood played its first full NCAA Division II and MIAA schedule during the 2012 season. The Lions defeated Lincoln University 49–28 in its MIAA debut and followed with a 35–14 home-opening win in week two against Southwest Baptist. The team lost to Central Missouri, but followed the loss with a three-game win streak that included a come-from-behind win versus non-conference opponent, Glenville State. The Lions then lost back-to-back games to ranked opponents, Emporia State and Washburn.

Senior Day versus Missouri Southern marked a big turning point in the season for the Lions. Down 14–0 early, Lindenwood rallied with 31 unanswered points to take a 31–14 lead. Missouri Southern State scored late in the half but Lindenwood continued to pull away in the second half, adding 14 points while holding MSSU to just 9 in the second half. The 45–30 win snapped the team's losing streak but the win was not without a big loss. Late in the game, Lindenwood freshman cornerback Sterling Thomas suffered a severe spinal cord injury. The team rallied around Thomas' injury and finished the regular season with back-to-back wins, including a 44–33 win against the defending national champion, Pittsburg State.

The Lions finished the regular season with an 8–3 overall record and 7–3 conference record. The team ranked fourth in the conference after being selected 8th in the preseason polls. With the top-four finish, the Lions were selected to play in the Mineral Water Bowl to play Winona State. In the team's first NCAA bowl game, the Lions kept the game close through the first quarter and a half but WSU scored 24 unanswered points to stretch their lead. Both teams exchanged touchdowns in the fourth quarter to hand Lindenwood its fourth loss of the season and bring the Lions overall record to 8–4.

== Coaches ==
The current head football coach at Lindenwood is Jed Stugart, who was hired on December 5, 2016. Patrick Ross, Lindenwood's 15th head coach, held the position from 2004 to 2016. The program began in 1990 under David Schroeder and has accumulated an overall record of 134 wins, 121 losses, and 2 ties.(as of conclusion of the 2012 season)

=== Coaching records ===
Coach	First season	Final season	Record
David Schroeder	1990	1991	11–8–1 (.575)
Jeff Driskill	1992	1994	5–25–1 (.177)
Dan Kratzer	1995	2000	29–35 (.453)
Rick Gorzynski	2001	2003	7–27 (.206)
Patrick Ross	2004	2016	93–57 (.620)
Jed Stugart	2017	present	8–14 (.364)

== Championships ==
=== Conference championships ===
Lindenwood has won five conference championships, three in the NAIA and two in NCAA Division II.

Year	Conference	Coach	Overall record	Conference record
2004	Heart of America Athletic Conference	Patrick Ross	11–1	10–0
2007	Heart of America Athletic Conference	Patrick Ross	10–2	9–1
2009	Heart of America Athletic Conference	Patrick Ross	13–1	10–0
2019	Great Lakes Valley Conference	Jed Stugart	9–4	7–0
2021	Great Lakes Valley Conference	Jed Stugart	9–3	7–0
Total conference championships				5

== Playoff appearances ==
=== NCAA Division II ===
The Lions made two appearances in the NCAA Division II playoffs, with a combined record of 1–2.

Year	Round	Opponent	Result
2019	First round Regional semifinals	Ouachita Baptist; NW Missouri State	W 41–38; L 7–63
2021	First round	Grand Valley State	L 3–20

=== NAIA ===
The Lions made six appearances in the NAIA playoffs, with a combined record of 5–6.

Year	Round	Opponent	Result
1998	First round	Southwestern (KS)	L 10–12
2004	First round	Hastings	L 19–20
2007	First round	Saint Francis (IN)	L 14–35
2008	First round Quarterfinals; Semifinals	Lambuth; Morningside; Carroll	W 65–48; W 34–31; L 37–38
2009	First round Quarterfinals; Semifinals; National Championship	Langston; Ottawa (KS); Carroll; Sioux Falls	W 49–14; W, 64–26; W 42–35; L 22–25
2010	First round	Saint Francis (IN)	L 38–46

== Bowl games ==
Lindenwood has participated in three bowl games with an overall record of 0 wins and 3 losses. In 2000, the Lions went to the first bowl game in school history, the Wheat Bowl, against Concordia University (Nebraska) and lost 14–31. 2006 saw Lindenwood return to the Wheat Bowl, this time against Northwestern Oklahoma State University. NWOSU defeated the Lions in a close game 14–13. Most recently, the Lions were defeated 41–21 by Winona State in the 2012 Mineral Water Bowl.

Date	Result	Bowl	Opponent	Score	Head coach
2000	Loss	Wheat Bowl	Concordia University (Nebraska)	14–31	Dan Kratzer
2006	Loss	Wheat Bowl	Northwestern Oklahoma State University	13–14	Patrick Ross
2012	Loss	Mineral Water Bowl	Winona State University	21–41	Patrick Ross

== Notable players ==
=== All-Americans ===
Eight players have garnered All-American honors:

- DeDe Dorsey (2005)
- Connor Harris (2014, 2015, 2016)

=== NFL alumni ===
- DeDe Dorsey – NFL running back for the Las Vegas Locomotives of the United Football League, previously with the Detroit Lions and Cincinnati Bengals.
- Brian Schaefering – NFL defensive end for the Cleveland Browns.
- Pierre Desir – NFL cornerback for the Cleveland Browns
- Connor Harris Linebacker for the Arizona Cardinals and Cincinnati Bengals
- Jonathan Harris Defensive Lineman for the Chicago Bears

=== Former players as coaches ===
- David Beaty, wide receiver from 1990 to 1993, former head football coach at the University of Kansas

== Future non-conference opponents ==
Announced schedules as of July 16, 2026.

2026	2027	2028	2029	2030
at Stony Brook	at Minnesota	at Kansas	at Oklahoma State	at Northern Iowa
at Missouri State		Northern Iowa	Murray State	at Murray State
at Eastern Michigan				
Chicago State				
