= List of NAIA Division II football seasons =

This is a list of NAIA (National Association of Intercollegiate Athletics) Division II football seasons from when the NAIA split its football championship into two divisions in 1970 until it consolidated back into a single championship in 1996.

== Multiple Divisions (1970–1996) ==
Year	NAIA Division II Champion	Coach of the Year
1970	Westminster (PA)	
1971	Cal Lutheran	
1972	Missouri Southern State	
1973	Northwestern (IA)	
1974	Texas Lutheran	
1975	Texas Lutheran (2)	
1976	Westminster (PA) (2)	
1977	Westminster (PA) (3)	
1978	Concordia–Moorhead	
1979	Findlay (OH)	Richard Strahm, Findlay
1980	Pacific Lutheran	Stan McGarvey, William Jewell
1981	Austin & Concordia–Moorhead (2)	
1982	Linfield	
1983	Northwestern (IA) (2)	
1984	Linfield (2)	
1985	Wisconsin–La Crosse	
1986	Linfield (3)	
1987	Pacific Lutheran (2)	
1988	Westminster (PA) (4)	
1989	Westminster (PA) (5)	
1990	Peru State	
1991	Georgetown (KY)	Kevin Donley (1)
1992	Findlay (OH) (2)	
1993	Pacific Lutheran (3)	
1994	Westminster (PA) (6)	
1995	Central Washington & Findlay (OH) (3)	
1996	Sioux Falls	

== See also ==
- List of NCAA Division I-A/FBS football seasons
- List of NCAA Division I-AA/FCS football seasons
- List of NCAA Division II football seasons
- List of NCAA Division III football seasons
