= Frosty Westering =

American football player and coach (1927–2013)

Biographical details
- Born: December 5, 1927; Council Bluffs, Iowa, U.S.
- Died: April 12, 2013 (aged 85); Tacoma, Washington, U.S.

Playing career

Football
- 1945: Drake
- 1951: Omaha

Coaching career (HC unless noted)

Football
- 1952–1955: Elkader HS (IA)
- 1956–1959: Fairfield HS (IA)
- 1962–1963: Parsons (IA)
- 1966–1971: Lea
- 1972–2003: Pacific Lutheran

Administrative career (AD unless noted)
- 1956–1960: Fairfield SH (IA)
- 1960–1964: Parsons (IA)

Head coaching record
- Overall: 305–96–7 (college football)
- Tournaments: Football; 23–12–1 (NAIA D-II playoffs); 8–3 (NCAA D-III playoffs)

Accomplishments and honors

Championships
- Football; 3 NAIA Division II (1980, 1987, 1993); 1 NCAA Division III (1999); 1 Iowa Conference (1962); 7 NWC (1973, 1975, 1979, 1981, 1983, 1998, 2001); 2 CFL Northern Division (1985–1986); 3 CFA Mount Rainier Division (1992–1994); 1 CFA Mount Hood Division (1995)

Awards
- Football; 2× NAIA Division II Coach of the Year (1983, 1993); AFCA NCAA Division III COY (1999)
- College Football Hall of Fame; Inducted in 2005 (profile)

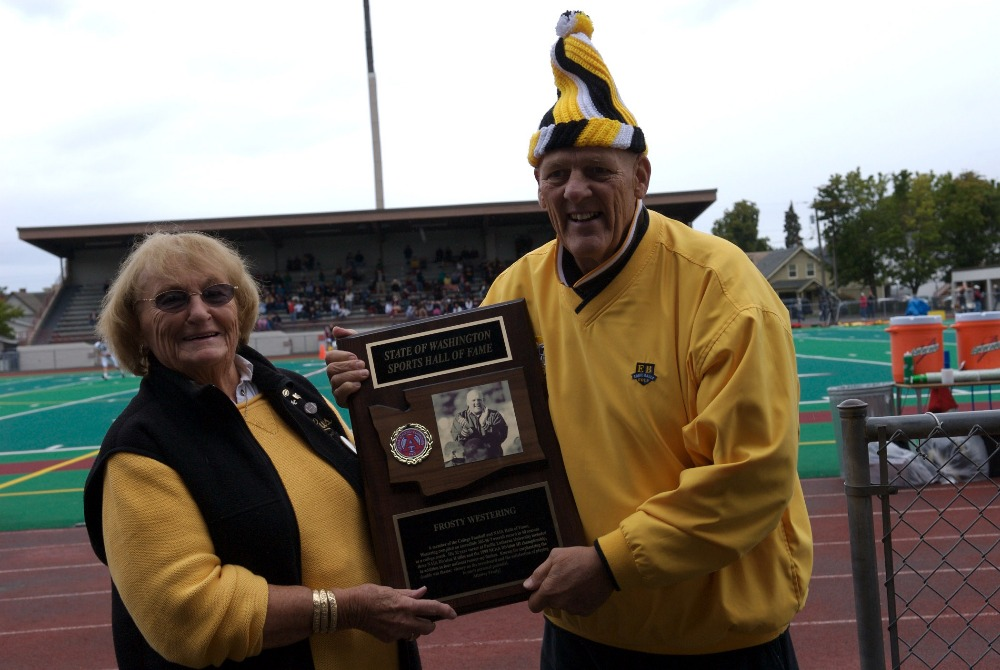
Frosty & Donna (wife) Westering being inducted into Washington State Hall of Fame

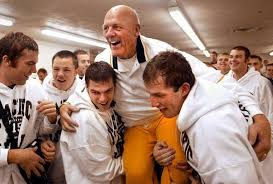
Frosty Westering celebrating with his team at PLU

Forrest Edward "Frosty" Westering (December 5, 1927 – April 12, 2013) was an American football coach. He served as the head coach at Parsons College in Fairfield, Iowa from 1962 to 1963, Lea College in Albert Lea, Minnesota from 1966 to 1971, and Pacific Lutheran University in Parkland, Washington 1972 from 2003, compiling a career college football coaching record of 305–96–7 and never had a losing season. Westering led his Pacific Lutheran Lutes teams to eight national championships, winning four: three NAIA Division II Football National Championship, in 1980, 1987, and 1993, and an NCAA Division III Football Championship in 1999. He retired as the ninth winningest coach in college football history. Westering was a recipient of the Amos Alonzo Stagg Award in 2013, was named the NCAA Division III Coach of the Year in 1999 and was named NAIA National College Football Coach of the Year in 1983 and 1993. He was inducted into the NAIA Hall of Fame in 1995 and the College Football Hall of Fame in 2005. Westering coached 26 NAIA and NCAA First Team All-Americans including his grandson Chad Johnson who was the recipient of the Gagliardi Trophy which is given to the most outstanding player in Division III college football. In 2019, ESPN ranked Frosty 39th on the list of "150 Greatest Coaches in College Football History."

After Westering retired, his son, Scott, took over as head football coach of the Pacific Lutheran Lutes after many successful seasons of being the offensive coordinator. He went 74–54 in 14 seasons including two NCAA Division III National Playoff Berths in 2012 and 2013. As head coach of the Lutes, Scott coached over fifty First Team All-Conference selections and was inducted into the Pacific Lutheran Athletics Hall of Fame. Scott was also an All-American tight end on Pacific Lutheran's 1980 National Championship team. His daughter, Sue Westering, is a gym teacher at Gig Harbor High School, and coached the girls volleyball team until 2014. She also assisted her brother at Pacific Lutheran.

Westering served in the United States Marine Corps immediately following World War II. Well known for his motivational speaking and his efforts to spread his positive outlook on life, Westering wrote popular books, Make the Big Time Where You Are and The Strange Secret of The Big Time. Westering is also highly popular for re-writing the poem "The Man in the Arena" originally written by Theodore Roosevelt Jr. in 1910. A true family man, Westering was married to Donna Belle Westering for over sixty years. Together they raised five children and had thirteen grandchildren. He was buried at Tahoma National Cemetery in Kent, Washington after he died on April 12, 2013, with his family at his side. He was 85.

== Playing career and military service ==
Westering played college football in 1945 at Drake University in Des Moines, Iowa and was a member of the Drake Bulldogs football team that won the 1946 Raisin Bowl. He enlisted the United States Marine Corps in January 1946. After his military service, he returned to college at the University of Omaha—now known as University of Nebraska Omaha—where he played football and ran track.

== Head coaching record ==
=== College football ===
| Year | Team | Overall | Conference | Standing | Bowl/playoffs |
|---|---|---|---|---|---|
Parsons Wildcats (Iowa Conference) (1962)
| 1962 | Parsons | 9–0 | 9–0 | 1st | |
Parsons Wildcats (NAIA independent) (1963)
| 1963 | Parsons | 5–4 | | | |
| Parsons: | | 14–4 | 9–0 | | |
Lea Lancers (Independent) (1966–1971)
| 1966 | Lea | 5–1–1 | | | |
| 1967 | Lea | 4–5 | | | |
| 1968 | Lea | 6–2–1 | | | |
| 1969 | Lea | 5–5 | | | |
| 1970 | Lea | 4–4 | | | |
| 1971 | Lea | 3–5 | | | |
| Lea: | | 27–22–2 | | | |
Pacific Lutheran Lutes (Northwest Conference) (1972–1984)
| 1972 | Pacific Lutheran | 6–3 | 4–2 | 3rd | |
| 1973 | Pacific Lutheran | 7–3 | 6–1 | 1st | |
| 1974 | Pacific Lutheran | 8–1 | 6–1 | 2nd | |
| 1975 | Pacific Lutheran | 7–2 | 6–1 | T–1st | |
| 1976 | Pacific Lutheran | 6–4 | 5–2 | T–2nd | |
| 1977 | Pacific Lutheran | 8–2 | 5–1 | 2nd | |
| 1978 | Pacific Lutheran | 6–3 | 3–2 | T–2nd | |
| 1979 | Pacific Lutheran | 9–2 | 5–0 | 1st | L NAIA Division II Semifinal |
| 1980 | Pacific Lutheran | 11–1 | 4–1 | 2nd | W NAIA Division II Championship |
| 1981 | Pacific Lutheran | 9–1 | 5–0 | 1st | L NAIA Division II Quarterfinal |
| 1982 | Pacific Lutheran | 7–2 | 4–1 | 2nd | |
| 1983 | Pacific Lutheran | 9–3 | 4–1 | 1st | L NAIA Division II Championship |
| 1984 | Pacific Lutheran | 6–3 | 3–1 | 2nd | |
Pacific Lutheran Lutes (Columbia Football League) (1985–1987)
| 1985 | Pacific Lutheran | 10–1–1 | 6–0 | 1st (Northern) | L NAIA Division II Championship |
| 1986 | Pacific Lutheran | 8–2 | 6–0 | 1st (Northern) | L NAIA Division II Quarterfinal |
| 1987 | Pacific Lutheran | 11–1–1 | 4–1–1 | 2nd (Northern) | T NAIA Division II Championship |
Pacific Lutheran Lutes (Columbia Football Association) (1988–1995)
| 1988 | Pacific Lutheran | 7–3 | 5–1 | 2nd (Mount Rainier) | L NAIA Division II First Round |
| 1989 | Pacific Lutheran | 6–2–1 | 4–1–1 | 2nd (Mount Rainier) | |
| 1990 | Pacific Lutheran | 9–2 | 5–1 | 2nd (Mount Rainier) | L NAIA Division II Quarterfinal |
| 1991 | Pacific Lutheran | 11–2 | 5–1 | 2nd (Mount Rainier) | L NAIA Division II Championship |
| 1992 | Pacific Lutheran | 9–2 | 5–0 | 1st (Mount Rainier) | L NAIA Division II Quarterfinal |
| 1993 | Pacific Lutheran | 12–0–1 | 5–0 | 1st (Mount Rainier) | W NAIA Division II Championship |
| 1994 | Pacific Lutheran | 11–2 | 5–0 | 1st (Mount Rainier) | L NAIA Division II Championship |
| 1995 | Pacific Lutheran | 6–3–1 | 4–0–1 | T–1st (Mount Hood) | L NAIA Division II First Round |
Pacific Lutheran Lutes (Northwest Conference) (1996–2003)
| 1996 | Pacific Lutheran | 7–3 | 4–1 | 2nd | L NAIA Division II First Round |
| 1997 | Pacific Lutheran | 7–2 | 3–2 | 3rd | |
| 1998 | Pacific Lutheran | 8–2 | 5–0 | 1st | L NCAA Division III First Round |
| 1999 | Pacific Lutheran | 13–1 | 4–1 | 2nd | W NCAA Division III Championship |
| 2000 | Pacific Lutheran | 9–2 | 4–1 | 2nd | L NCAA Division III Second Round |
| 2001 | Pacific Lutheran | 8–3 | 4–1 | 1st | L NCAA Division III Quarterfinal |
| 2002 | Pacific Lutheran | 5–4 | 3–2 | T–2nd | |
| 2003 | Pacific Lutheran | 6–3 | 3–2 | 3rd | |
| Pacific Lutheran: | | 262–70–5 | 144–29–3 | | |
| Total: | | 303–96–7 | | | |
National championship Conference title Conference division title or championship game berth

== See also ==
- List of college football career coaching wins leaders
