= Jim Palazzolo =

American football coach

Coaching career (HC unless noted)
- 1983–1986: Rocky Mountain
- 1987–1988: Ithaca (OB)
- 1989–1995: Southern Oregon

Head coaching record
- Overall: 45–51–2

Accomplishments and honors

Championships
- 1 Frontier Conference (1984); 1 CFA Mount Hood League (1990)

Jim Palazzolo is an American former football coach. He served as the head football coach at Rocky Mountain College from 1983 to 1986 and Southern Oregon University from 1989 until 1995, compiling a career college football coaching record of 45–51–2.

== Head coaching record ==
Year	Team	Overall	Conference	Standing	Bowl/playoffs	NAIA Coaches' Poll^{#}
Rocky Mountain Battlin' Bears (Frontier Conference) (1983–1986)
1983	Rocky Mountain	2–6	1–5	4th		
1984	Rocky Mountain	7–2	6–0	1st		
1985	Rocky Mountain	2–7	2–4	3rd		
1986	Rocky Mountain	4–5	3–3	T–2nd		
Rocky Mountain:		15–20	12–12			
Southern Oregon Raiders (Columbia Football Association) (1989–1995)
1989	Southern Oregon	5–3–1	4–1–1	T–2nd (Mount Hood)		
1990	Southern Oregon	6–3	6–0	1st (Mount Hood)		23
1991	Southern Oregon	5–3–1	4–2	3rd (Mount Hood)		25
1992	Southern Oregon	3–6	2–4	T–5th (Mount Hood)		
1993	Southern Oregon	4–5	3–2	T–2nd (Mount Hood)		
1994	Southern Oregon	3–6	2–3	4th (Mount Hood)		
1995	Southern Oregon	4–5	2–3	T–3rd (Mount Rainier)		
Southern Oregon:		30–31–2	23–15–1			
Total:		45–51–2				
National championship Conference title Conference division title or championship game berth
