= Jeff Zenisek =

American football coach (born c. 1953)

Current position
- Title: Head coach
- Team: Ellensburg HS (WA)

Biographical details
- Born: c. 1953

Playing career
- c. 1983: Central Washington

Coaching career (HC unless noted)
- 1986–1989: Orcas Island HS (WA)
- 1990–1991: Central Washington (DC)
- 1992–1996: Central Washington
- 1997–2000: Northern Iowa (assistant)
- 2001–2005: Western State (CO)
- 2009: Mercer Island HS (WA) (DC)
- 2010–2013: Tenino HS (WA)
- 2014–2015: Thomas Jefferson HS (WA)
- 2016–2018: White River HS (WA)
- 2019–present: Ellensburg HS (WA)

Head coaching record
- Overall: 56–51–1 (college)
- Tournaments: 4–1–1 (NAIA playoffs)

Accomplishments and honors

Championships
- 1 NAIA Division II (1995)

Jeff Zenisek (born c. 1953) is an American football coach. He is the head football coach at Ellensburg High School in Ellensburg, Washington, a position he has held since 2019. Zenisek served as the head football coach at the Central Washington University from 1992 to 1996 and Western State College of Colorado—now known as Western Colorado University—from 2001 to 2005, compiling a career college football coaching record of 56–51–1 He led the 1995 Central Washington Wildcats football team to a share of the NAIA Division II Football National Championship.

== Head coaching record ==
=== College ===
Year	Team	Overall	Conference	Standing	Bowl/playoffs
Central Washington Wildcats (Columbia Football Association) (1992–1996)
1992	Central Washington	6–3	3–2	T–2nd (Mount Rainier)	
1993	Central Washington	9–2	4–1	2nd (Mount Rainier)	L NAIA Division II Quarterfinal
1994	Central Washington	5–4	2–3	T–3rd (Mount Rainier)	
1995	Central Washington	10–3–1	4–1	2nd (Mount Rainier)	T NAIA Division II Championship
1996	Central Washington	5–5	3–2	T–2nd	
Central Washington:		35–17–1	16–9		
Western State Mountaineers (Rocky Mountain Athletic Conference) (2001–2005)
2001	Western State	6–5	5–3	T–3rd	
2002	Western State	5–6	4–4	T–4th	
2003	Western State	5–6	4–4	T–4th	
2004	Western State	3–8	2–6	T–7th	
2005	Western State	2–9	2–6	T–7th	
Western State:		21–34	17–23		
Total:		51–56–1			
National championship Conference title Conference division title or championship game berth
