= Brad Jenkins (American football) =

American football player and coach

Biographical details
- Born: c. 1953; North Platte, Nebraska, U.S.
- Education: UNL

Playing career
- 1972–1975: Nebraska
- Position: Tight end

Coaching career (HC unless noted)
- 1987–1995: Kansas Wesleyan
- 1998–?: Fort Hays State (OC)

Head coaching record
- Overall: 49–40

Brad Jenkins (born c. 1953) is an American former football player and coach. He served as the head football coach at Kansas Wesleyan University in Salina, Kansas from 1987 to 1995, compiling a record of 49–40.

== Playing career ==
Jenkins played tight end for the Nebraska Cornhuskers from 1972 through 1975. He was drafted into by the Tampa Bay Buccaneers in the 13th round of the 1976 NFL draft, but never played a regular season game in the National Football League (NFL).

== Coaching career ==
Jenkins was the 18th head football coach at Kansas Wesleyan University in Salina, Kansas and he held that position for nine seasons, from 1987 until 1995. His coaching record at Kansas Wesleyan was 49–40.

Jenkins also coached for Fort Hays State under Jeff Leiker.

== Head coaching record ==
Year	Team	Overall	Conference	Standing	Bowl/playoffs
Kansas Wesleyan Coyotes (Kansas Collegiate Athletic Conference) (1987–1997)
1987	Kansas Wesleyan	7–3	7–2	3rd	
1988	Kansas Wesleyan	5–4	5–4	T–4th	
1989	Kansas Wesleyan	6–4	5–4	4th	
1990	Kansas Wesleyan	6–4	5–4	T–5th	
1991	Kansas Wesleyan	3–7	3–6	T–6th	
1992	Kansas Wesleyan	3–7	3–5	T–5th	
1993	Kansas Wesleyan	4–6	3–5	T–6th	
1994	Kansas Wesleyan	7–3	6–2	3rd	
1995	Kansas Wesleyan	8–2			
Kansas Wesleyan:		49–40			
Total:		49–40			
