= Dick Strahm =

American football coach (1934–2026)

Biographical details
- Born: February 23, 1934; Toledo, Ohio, U.S.
- Died: June 9, 2026 (aged 92)

Coaching career (HC unless noted)
- 1970–1972: Toledo (DC)
- 1973–1974: Kansas State (assistant)
- 1975–1998: Findlay

Head coaching record
- Overall: 183–64–5
- Tournaments: 18–8–1 (NAIA D-II playoffs); 4–0 (NAIA playoffs)

Accomplishments and honors

Championships
- 3 NAIA Division II (1979, 1992, 1995); 1 NAIA (1997); 8 Hoosier–Buckeye (1976–1979, 1982–1985); 3 SMFA Midwest League (1995–1997)

Awards
- 2× NAIA Division II Coach of the Year (1979, 1995); NAIA Coach of the Year (1997)
- College Football Hall of Fame; Inducted in 2004 (profile)

Richard Milton Strahm (February 23, 1934 – June 9, 2026) was an American college football coach. He served as the head coach at the University of Findlay in Findlay, Ohio from 1975 to 1998, compiling a record of 183–64–5. His Findlay teams won four NAIA Football National Championships, in 1979, 1992, 1995, and 1997. Strahm was inducted into the College Football Hall of Fame in 2004. His biography entitled Just Call Me Coach, written by John Grindrod, was released in 2008.

In 2023, Findlay announced plans to construct an athletic facility in his honor.

Strahm died on June 9, 2026, at the age of 92.

== Head coaching record ==
Year	Team	Overall	Conference	Standing	Bowl/playoffs
Findlay Oilers (Hoosier–Buckeye Conference) (1975–1985)
1975	Findlay	2–8	2–6	T–6th	
1976	Findlay	6–3	6–2	T–1st	
1977	Findlay	6–2–1	6–1–1	T–1st	
1978	Findlay	11–1	8–0	1st	L NAIA Division II Championship
1979	Findlay	10–1–1	7–1	T–1st	W NAIA Division II Championship
1980	Findlay	5–4	5–3	4th	
1981	Findlay	8–1	7–1	2nd	
1982	Findlay	8–1	7–1	T–1st	
1983	Findlay	8–2	6–1	T–1st	L NAIA Division II Quarterfinal
1984	Findlay	6–3	6–0	1st	L NAIA Division II Quarterfinal
1985	Findlay	10–1	6–0	1st	L NAIA Division II Semifinal
Findlay Oilers (NAIA Division II independent) (1986–1993)
1986	Findlay	5–4			
1987	Findlay	5–4			
1988	Findlay	3–6			
1989	Findlay	7–3			
1990	Findlay	7–2–1			
1991	Findlay	9–3			L NAIA Division II Quarterfinal
1992	Findlay	12–1			W NAIA Division II Championship
1993	Findlay	8–3			L NAIA Division II Quarterfinal
Findlay Oilers (Mid-States Football Association) (1994–1997)
1994	Findlay	6–4	4–1	2nd (MWL)	L NAIA Division II First Round
1995	Findlay	10–1–2	4–1	T–1st (MWL)	T NAIA Division II Championship
1996	Findlay	12–1	6–0	1st (MWL)	L NAIA Division II Semifinal
1997	Findlay	14–0	6–0	1st (MWL)	W NAIA Championship
Findlay Oilers (Midwest Intercollegiate Football Conference) (1998)
1998	Findlay	5–5	5–5	T–6th	
Findlay:		183–64–5			
Total:		183–64–5			
National championship Conference title Conference division title or championship game berth
