= NAIA Division II football national championship =

- NAIA Logo
- In operation: 1970–1996
- Preceded by: NAIA Championship
- Succeeded by: NAIA Championship
- Number of playoff teams: 8
- Most playoff championships: Westminster (PA) (6)
- Website: NAIA Football

The NAIA Division II football national championship was a postseason playoff system featuring the best NAIA Division II college football teams in the United States. It was played annually between 1970 and 1996 when NAIA football play was divided into two divisions based on school enrollment size; the NAIA Division I football national championship was played separately. It was typically held at the home field of the higher-seeded team. The championship was discontinued in 1997 after the two divisions were consolidated once again. The singular NAIA football national championship has been held every year since.

Westminster (PA) was the most successful team at the Division II level, winning the national title six times.

== Results ==
Season	Date	Champion	Score	Runner-up	Location	Winning head coach(es)
1970	December 5, 1970	Westminster (PA)	21–16	Anderson (IN)	New Castle, Pennsylvania	Harold Burry
1971	December 4, 1971	Cal Lutheran	30–14	Westminster (PA)	Thousand Oaks, California	Bob Shoup
1972	December 2, 1972	Missouri Southern	21–14	Northwestern (IA)	Joplin, Missouri	Jim Frazier
1973	December 1, 1973	Northwestern (IA)	10–3	Glenville State	Huntington, West Virginia	Larry Korver
1974	December 7, 1974	Texas Lutheran	42–0	Missouri Valley	Seguin, Texas	Jim Wacker
1975	December 6, 1975	Texas Lutheran	34–8	Cal Lutheran	Thousand Oaks, California	Jim Wacker
1976	December 4, 1976	Westminster (PA)	20–13	Redlands	Redlands, California	Joe Fusco
1977	December 3, 1977	Westminster (PA)	17–9	Cal Lutheran	Thousand Oaks, California	Joe Fusco
1978	December 9, 1978	Concordia (MN)	7–0	Findlay	Findlay, Ohio	Jim Christopherson
1979	December 8, 1979	Findlay	51–6	Northwestern (IA)	Findlay, Ohio	Dick Strahm
1980	December 13, 1980	Pacific Lutheran	38–10	Wilmington (OH)	Tacoma, Washington	Frosty Westering
1981	December 12, 1981	Austin; Concordia (MN)	24–24 (Note: Game ended in a tie with both teams as co-champions.)		Sherman, Texas	Larry Kramer; Jim Christopherson
1982	December 11, 1982	Linfield	33–15	William Jewell	McMinnville, Oregon	Ad Rutschman
1983	December 10, 1983	Northwestern (IA)	25–21	Pacific Lutheran	Tacoma, Washington	Larry Korver
1984	December 8, 1984	Linfield	33–22	Northwestern (IA)	McMinnville, Oregon	Ad Rutschman
1985	December 13, 1985	Wisconsin–La Crosse	24–7	Pacific Lutheran	Tacoma, Washington	Roger Harring
1986	December 13, 1986	Linfield	17–0	Baker	McMinnville, Oregon	Ad Rutschman
1987	December 13, 1987	Pacific Lutheran; Wisconsin–Stevens Point (forfeited)	16–16 (Note: Pacific Lutheran and the Wisconsin–Stevens Point played to a 16–16 tie in the championship game. Wisconsin–Stevens Point forfeited its entire 1987 schedule because of the use of two ineligible players. Pacific Lutheran is considered a co-champion with the other position vacated.)		Tacoma, Washington	Frosty Westering; D. J. LeRoy
1988	December 10, 1988	Westminster (PA)	21–14	Wisconsin–La Crosse	New Wilmington, Pennsylvania	Joe Fusco
1989	December 16, 1989	Westminster (PA)	51–30	Wisconsin–La Crosse	Canton, Ohio	Joe Fusco
1990	December 15, 1990	Peru State	17–7	Westminster (PA)	Omaha, Nebraska	Tom Shea
1991	December 21, 1991	Georgetown (KY)	28–20	Pacific Lutheran	Georgetown, Kentucky	Kevin Donley
1992	December 19, 1992	Findlay	26–13	Linfield	Portland, Oregon	Dick Strahm
1993	December 18, 1993	Pacific Lutheran	50–20	Westminster (PA)	Portland, Oregon	Frosty Westering
1994	December 17, 1994	Westminster (PA)	27–7	Pacific Lutheran	Portland, Oregon	Gene Nicholson
1995	December 16, 1995	Central Washington; Findlay	21–21		Tacoma, Washington	Jeff Zenisek; Dick Strahm
1996	December 21, 1996	Sioux Falls	47–25	Western Washington	Savannah, Tennessee	Bob Young

== Championships by school ==
- Only includes titles won at the NAIA Division II level.
- Programs that no longer compete in NAIA are indicated in italics with a pink background.

=== Active NAIA programs ===
Team	Titles	Years
Northwestern (IA)	2	1973, 1983
Georgetown (KY)	1	1991
Peru State	1	1990

=== Former NAIA programs ===
Team	Titles	Years
Westminster (PA)	6	1970, 1976, 1977, 1988, 1989, 1994
Findlay	3	1979, 1992, 1995
Pacific Lutheran	3	1980, 1987, 1993
Linfield	3	1982, 1984, 1986
Concordia Moorhead	2	1978, 1981
Texas Lutheran	2	1974, 1975
Sioux Falls	1	1996
Central Washington	1	1995
Wisconsin–La Crosse	1	1985
Austin	1	1981
Missouri Southern	1	1972
Cal Lutheran	1	1971

== See also ==
- NAIA Division I football national championship
