= 1997 Humboldt State Lumberjacks football team =

American college football season

1997 Humboldt State Lumberjacks football
- Conference: Columbia Football Association
- Record: 2–8 (1–4 CFA)
- Head coach: Fred Whitmire (7th season)
- Home stadium: Redwood Bowl

1997 Columbia Football Association standings
	Conf.			Overall
Team	W		L	W		L
No. 13 Western Oregon $^	4	–	1	7	–	3
Central Washington	3	–	2	5	–	4
Southern Oregon	3	–	2	5	–	4
Western Washington	3	–	2	5	–	5
Simon Fraser	1	–	4	2	–	7
Humboldt State *	1	–	4	2	–	8
$ – Conference champion; ^ – NAIA playoff participant * – Principally an NCAA member; Rankings from NAIA poll

The 1997 Humboldt State Lumberjacks football team represented Humboldt State University—now known as California State Polytechnic University, Humboldt—as a member of the Columbia Football Association (CFA) during the 1997 NCAA Division II football season. Led by seventh-year head coach Fred Whitmire, the Lumberjacks compiled an overall record of 2–8 with a mark of 1–4 in conference play, tying for fifth place in the CFA. The team was outscored its by opponents 332 to 173 for the season. Humboldt State played home games at the Redwood Bowl in Arcata, California.

Humboldt State joined the CFA for the 1997 season after competing in the Northern California Athletic Conference (NCAC) since 1940.

== Schedule ==
Date	Opponent	Site	Result
September 6	Montana Tech*	Redwood Bowl; Arcata, CA	L 17–34
September 13	at Willamette*	McCulloch Stadium; Salem, OR	L 14–42
September 20	at Western Montana*	Dillon, MT	W 33–20
September 27	Azusa Pacific*	Redwood Bowl; Arcata, CA	L 12–16
October 4	Saint Mary's*	Redwood Bowl; Arcata, CA	L 6–44
October 11	Western Washington	Redwood Bowl; Arcata, CA	L 7–45
October 18	at Simon Fraser	Thunderbird Stadium; University Endowment Lands, BC	L 16–21
November 1	Western Oregon	Redwood Bowl; Arcata, CA	L 21–31
November 8	at Southern Oregon	Fuller Field; Ashland, OR	L 7–49
November 15	at Central Washington	Tomlinson Stadium; Ellensburg, WA	W 40–30
*Non-conference game
