= 1993 Pacific Lutheran Lutes football team =

American college football season

1993 Pacific Lutheran Lutes football

NAIA Division II national champion CFA champion
- Conference: Columbia Football Association
- Record: 12–0–1 (5–0 CFA)
- Head coach: Frosty Westering (22nd season)
- Home stadium: Carl Sparks Stadium

1993 Columbia Football Association standings
	Conf.					Overall
Team	W		L		T	W		L		T
Mount Hood League
No. 12 Linfield x^	4	–	1	–	0	6	–	3	–	1
Willamette	3	–	2	–	0	5	–	4	–	0
Southern Oregon	3	–	2	–	0	4	–	5	–	0
Eastern Oregon	2	–	3	–	0	4	–	5	–	0
Lewis & Clark	2	–	3	–	0	4	–	5	–	0
Western Oregon	1	–	4	–	0	3	–	5	–	1
Mount Rainier League
No. 1 Pacific Lutheran x^	5	–	0	–	0	12	–	0	–	1
No. 3 Central Washington ^	4	–	1	–	0	9	–	2	–	0
No. 19 Western Washington	3	–	2	–	0	6	–	3	–	0
Simon Fraser	2	–	3	–	0	3	–	7	–	0
Whitworth	1	–	4	–	0	1	–	8	–	0
Puget Sound	0	–	5	–	0	0	–	8	–	1
x – League champion/co-champions ^ – NAIA Division II playoff participant; Rankings from NAIA Division II poll

The 1993 Pacific Lutheran Lutes football team was an American football team that represented Pacific Lutheran University in the Columbia Football Association (CFA) during the 1993 NAIA Division II football season. In their 22nd season under head coach Frosty Westering, the Lutes compiled a 12–0–1 record and won the NAIA Division II national championship. The Lutes began the season ranked #1 in the NAIA national polls and ended the season National Champions. The team participated in the NAIA Division II playoffs where they defeated Cumberland (Tennessee) (61–7) in the first round, Central Washington (35–17) in the quarterfinal, Baker (Kansas) (52–14) in the semifinal, and Westminster (Pennsylvania) (50–20) in the national championship game played at Civic Stadium in Portland, Oregon.

The team played its five home games at Sparks Stadium in Puyallup, Washington, and also played three of its games (including one playoff games) at the Tacoma Dome in Tacoma, Washington, located 10 miles to the northwest of Puyallup.

The undefeated 1993 season was generated by an outstanding offensive attack led by All-American's Marc Weekly, Chad Barnett, Gavin Stanley, and Jeff Douglas. Weekly was also named the Columbia Football Association Offensive Player of the Year in 1993 while Barnett, Stanley, Douglas and Brian Flattum were all named First Team All-Conference. The 1993 offense still holds team records at PLU for passing yards (3,829), total yards (6,105), highest scoring average (44.1) and most points (573). This offense is highly regarded as the best offense to ever come through PLU.

Leading the national champion defense was All-American and Columbia Football Association Defensive Player of the Year, Ted Riddall. Riddall was accompanied by fellow All-American's Albert Jackson, Jason Thiel, and Judd Benedick.

Coach Frosty Westering was elected NAIA Division II Coach of the Year in 1993 for his undefeated, national championship season. Westering went on to win four national championships at Pacific Lutheran (1980, 1987, 1993, and 1999) and was inducted into the College Football Hall of Fame in 2005. He eventually wrote two books, Make The Big Time Where You Are and The Strange Secret of the Big Time that both showcase the philosophies he demonstrated to his teams at PLU and how he lived his life.

== Schedule ==
Date	Opponent	Site	Result	Attendance	Source
September 18	vs. Linfield	Tacoma Dome; Tacoma, WA	T 20–20	5,125	
September 25	Eastern Oregon	Sparks Stadium; Puyallup, WA	W 43–13		
October 2	at Southern Oregon	Raider Stadium; Ashland, OR	W 50–23	2,600	
October 9	at Willamette	Salem, OR	W 48–36	1,700	
October 16	Central Washington	Sparks Stadium; Puyallup, WA	W 49–48	4,646	
October 23	Simon Fraser	Sparks Stadium; Puyallup, WA	W 42–4	1,250 Estimated	
October 30	at Whitworth	Pine Bowl; Spokane, WA	W 45–13		
November 6	at Western Washington	Civic Stadium; Bellingham, WA	W 37–29	4,560	
November 13	vs. Puget Sound	Tacoma Dome; Tacoma, WA	W 41–7	3,685	
November 20	vs. Cumberland (TN)*	Tacoma, WA (NAIA Division II first round)	W 61–7	1,850	
December 4	Central Washington*	Sparks Stadium; Puyallup, WA (NAIA Division II quarterfinal)	W 35–17	4,125	
December 11	Baker*	Sparks Stadium; Puyallup, WA (NAIA Division II semifinal)	W 52–14	3,850	
December 18	vs. Westminster (PA)*	Portland, OR (NAIA Division II Championship Game)	W 50–20	7,262	
*Non-conference game
