= Findlay Oilers football =

- First season: 1892; 134 years ago
- Head coach: Tyler Johns; 1st season, 6–1 (.857)
- Location: Findlay, Ohio
- Stadium: Donnell Stadium (capacity: 8,200)
- NCAA division: Division II
- Conference: G-MAC
- Colors: Black and orange

NAIA national championships
- NAIA: 1997 NAIA Division II: 1979, 1992, 1995
- Website: findlayoilers.com

The Findlay Oilers football team represents University of Findlay, located in Findlay, Ohio, in NCAA Division II college football.

The Oilers, who began playing football in 1892, compete as members of the Great Midwest Athletic Conference.

Findlay have won four national championships, all as members of the NAIA.

== History ==
=== Conferences ===
- 1892–1920: Independent
- 1921–1932: Northwest Ohio League
- 1933: Independent
- 1934–1948: Ohio Athletic Conference
- 1949–1961: Mid-Ohio Conference
- 1962–1967: Independent
- 1971–1985: Hoosier–Buckeye Conference
- 1986–1993: NAIA Independent
- 1994–1997: Mid-States Football Association
- 1998: Midwest Intercollegiate Football Conference
- 1999–2017: Great Lakes Intercollegiate Athletic Conference
- 2017–present: Great Midwest Athletic Conference

== Championships ==
=== National championships ===
Year	Association	Division	Head coach	Record	Opponent	Result
1979	NAIA (4)	Division II (3)	Dick Strahm (4)	10–1–1 (7–1 H-BC)	Northwestern (IA)	W, 51–6
1992	NAIA (4)	Division II (3)	Dick Strahm (4)	12–1	Linfield	W, 26–13
1995	NAIA (4)	Division II (3)	Dick Strahm (4)	10–1–2 (4–1 MSFA)	Central Washington	T, 21–21
1997	NAIA (4)	Single (1)	Dick Strahm (4)	14–0 (6–0 MSFA)	Willamette	W, 14–7

== Postseason appearances ==
=== NCAA Division II ===
The Oilers have made four appearances in the NCAA Division II playoffs, with a combined record of 1–3.

Year	Round	Opponent	Result
2017	First Round; Second Round	Shepherd; Assumption	W, 29–17; L, 26–45
2021	First Round	Shepherd	L, 31–38
2025	First Round	Minnesota State	L, 14–37
2026	First Round	Augustana (SD)	TBP

=== NAIA ===
Findlay made thirteen appearances in the NAIA playoffs, with a combined record of 21–9–1 and four national championships.

Year	Round	Opponent	Result
1964	Semifinals	Sam Houston State	L, 12–32
1978	Quarterfinals; Semifinals; National Championship	Tarleton State; Missouri Valley; Concordia Moorhead	W, 13–6; W, 27–9; L, 0–7
1979	Quarterfinals; Semifinals; National Championship	Jamestown; Pacific Lutheran; Northwestern (IA)	W, 41–15; W, 9–0; W, 51–6
1983	Quarterfinals	Westminster (PA)	L, 0–28
1984	Quarterfinals	Hanover	L, 17–18
1985	Quarterfinals; Semifinals	Saint Ambrose; Pacific Lutheran	W, 7–0; L, 29–40
1991	First Round; Quarterfinals	Westminster (PA); Georgetown (KY)	W, 9–8; L, 19–37
1992	First Round; Quarterfinals; Semifinals; National Championship	Georgetown (KY); Westminster (PA); Benedictine (KS); Linfield	W, 32–14; W, 13–7; W, 27–24; W, 26–13
1993	First Round; Quarterfinals	Tiffin; Westminster (PA)	W, 28–14; L, 0–24
1994	First Round	Westminster (PA)	L, 30–41
1995	First Round; Quarterfinals; Semifinals; National Championship	Pacific Lutheran; Malone; Lambuth; Central Washington	W, 21–7; W, 15–7; W, 63–13; T, 21–21
1996	First Round; Quarterfinals; Semifinals	Geneva; Westminster (PA); Western Washington	W, 38–13; W, 28–9; L, 21–28
1997	First Round; Quarterfinals; Semifinals; National Championship	Westminster (PA); Geneva; Doane; Willamette	W, 40–0; W, 28–7; W, 26–25; W, 14–7
