= 1995 Central Washington Wildcats football team =

American college football season

1995 Central Washington Wildcats football

NAIA Division II national co-champion

NAIA Division II National Championship Game, T 21–21 vs. Findlay
- Conference: Columbia Football Association
- Mount Rainier League
- Record: 10–3–1 (4–1 CFA)
- Head coach: Jeff Zenisek (4th season)
- Home stadium: Tomlinson Stadium

1995 Columbia Football Association standings
	Conf.					Overall
Team	W		L		T	W		L		T
Mount Hood League
No. 15 Pacific Lutheran x^	4	–	0	–	1	6	–	3	–	1
No. 18 Willamette x	4	–	0	–	1	6	–	2	–	1
No. 21 Linfield	3	–	2	–	0	6	–	3	–	0
Puget Sound	2	–	3	–	0	2	–	7	–	0
Lewis & Clark	1	–	4	–	0	5	–	4	–	0
Whitworth	0	–	5	–	0	1	–	8	–	0
Mount Rainier League
No. 1 Western Washington x^	5	–	0	–	0	9	–	1	–	0
No. 14 Central Washington ^	4	–	1	–	0	10	–	3	–	1
Simon Fraser	2	–	3	–	0	4	–	6	–	0
Southern Oregon	2	–	3	–	0	4	–	5	–	0
Western Oregon	1	–	4	–	0	2	–	7	–	0
Eastern Oregon	1	–	4	–	0	1	–	8	–	0
x – League champion/co-champions ^ – NAIA Division II playoff participant; Rankings from NAIA Division II poll

The 1995 Central Washington Wildcats football team was an American football team that represented Central Washington University and won the national championship during the 1995 NAIA Division II football season. In their fourth season under head coach Jeff Zenisek, the Wildcats compiled a 7–3 record in the regular season.

Led by senior quarterback Jon Kitna, CWU participated in the NAIA Division II playoffs, defeating Western Washington (28–21) in the first round, Hardin–Simmons (40–20) in the quarterfinals, and Mary (48–7) in the semifinals. In the championship game at the Tacoma Dome, the Wildcats played to a 21–21 tie with Findlay, resulting in both teams being national co-champions for NAIA Division II.

The team played its home games at Tomlinson Stadium in Ellensburg, Washington, and finished with an overall record of 10–3–1 (.750).

== Schedule ==
Date	Opponent	Site	Result	Attendance	Source
September 9	at Montana State*	Sales Stadium; Bozeman, MT	L 14–34	8,527	
September 16	vs. Willamette	Lampson Stadium; Kennewick, WA	W 21–16	3,000	
September 23	at Whitworth	Pine Bowl; Spokane, WA	W 27–10		
September 30	at Pacific Lutheran	Sparks Stadium; Puyallup, WA	L 32–35		
October 7	Puget Sound	Tomlinson Stadium; Ellensburg, WA	W 52–6		
October 14	Simon Fraser	Tomlinson Stadium; Ellensburg, WA	W 34–19		
October 21	at Western Washington	Civic Stadium; Bellingham, WA	L 16–19		
October 28	Southern Oregon	Tomlinson Stadium; Ellensburg, WA	W 47–22		
November 4	at Western Oregon	McArthur Field; Monmouth, OR	W 56–7		
November 11	at Eastern Oregon	Community Stadium; La Grande, OR	W 21–13		
November 18	at Western Washington*	Civic Stadium; Bellingham, WA (NAIA Division II first round)	W 28–21		
December 2	at Hardin–Simmons*	Shelton Stadium; Abilene, TX (NAIA Division II quarterfinal)	W 40–20		
December 9	vs. Mary*	Sparks Stadium; Puyallup, WA (NAIA Division II semifinal)	W 48–7	3,100	
December 16	vs. Findlay*	Tacoma Dome; Tacoma, WA (NAIA Division II championship)	T 21–21	5,628	
*Non-conference game
