= Griswold Stadium =

Sports venue in Portland, Oregon

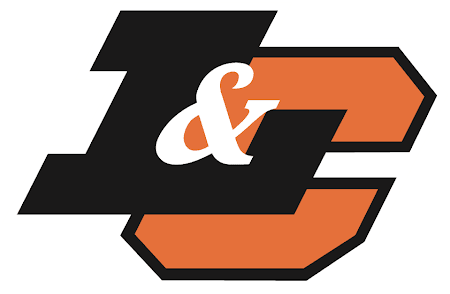

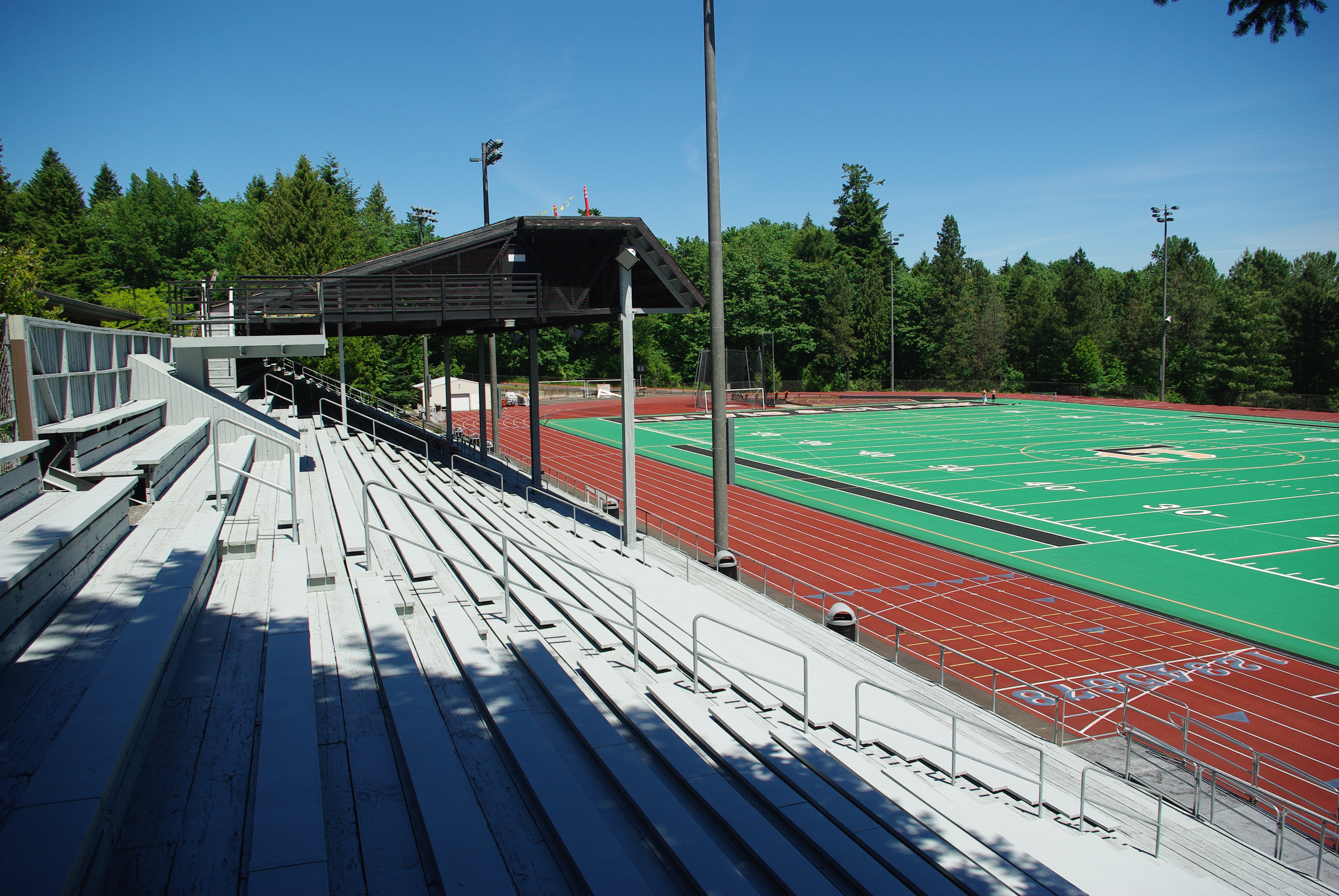
- View of the stadium in 2009
- Interactive map of Griswold Stadium
- Full name: Eldon Fix Track and Fred Wilson Field at Griswold Stadium
- Location: Portland, Oregon
- Coordinates: 45.452123°N 122.672052°W
- Owner: Lewis & Clark College
- Operator: L&C College Athletics
- Capacity: 3,500
- Type: Stadium
- Surface: AstroTurf GameDay Grass 3D
- Scoreboard: east endzone
- Current use: Football; Soccer; Track and field

Construction
- Groundbreaking: 1952
- Built: 1953
- Opened: October 1953; 73 years ago
- Renovated: 1999, 2003, 2012
- Cost: US$25,000 (1953)

Tenants
- Lewis & Clark Pioneers teams: Lewis & Clark Pioneers football (1955–present), soccer, track and field

Website
- lcpioneers.com/griswold-stadium

Griswold Stadium is a stadium located in Portland, Oregon, owned by the Lewis & Clark College. The stadium serves as home of the university's football, soccer and track and field (at the "Eldon Fix Track") teams.

Featuring an AstroTurf field and a seating capacity of 3,500, the land that the stadium sits on was forested before it was built.

== History ==
In 1952, Graham Griswold donated US$25,000 and lumber towards the erection of a new football stadium, complete with grandstands. The first game that occurred at the stadium took place on October 10, 1953, with Lewis & Clark against the Linfield Wildcats football team. It was officially named "Griswold Stadium" in 1954 after the benefactor of the construction project. In 2003, lights were installed at Griswold Stadium allowing for night games. The AstroTurf (GameDay Grass 3D brand) playing surface was purchased for the field in 2010.

The school dedicated the field to former player and coach Fred Wilson that year. Located in the stadium is the Eldon Fix Track which was last resurfaced in 1999. In 2012, the grandstands were rebuilt to allow for 3,000 general admission seats and 500 VIP seats. In 1955, the Oregon state high school cross country championships took place at Griswold Stadium.

== See also ==
- List of sports venues in Portland, Oregon
