= 1999 Pacific Lutheran Lutes football team =

American college football season

1999 Pacific Lutheran Lutes football

NCAA Division III champion

Stagg Bowl, W 42–13 vs. Rowan
- Conference: Northwest Conference
- Record: 13–1 (4–1 NWC)
- Head coach: Frosty Westering (28th season)
- Home stadium: Carl Sparks Stadium

1999 Northwest Conference football standings
	Conf.			Overall
Team	W		L	W		L
Willamette $^	5	–	0	7	–	4
Pacific Lutheran ^	4	–	1	13	–	1
Linfield	3	–	2	6	–	3
Whitworth	2	–	3	5	–	5
Puget Sound	1	–	4	1	–	8
Lewis & Clark	0	–	5	0	–	9
$ – Conference champion; ^ – NCAA Division III playoff participant

The 1999 Pacific Lutheran Lutes football team was an American football team that represented Pacific Lutheran University in the Northwest Conference during the 1999 NCAA Division III football season. In their 28th season under head coach Frosty Westering, the Lutes compiled a 13–1 record and won the NCAA Division III national championship. The team participated in the NCAA Division III playoffs where they defeated Saint John's (Minnesota) in the quarterfinal, Trinity (Texas) in the semifinal, and Rowan in the national championship game.

The team was led on offense by running back Anthony Hicks. Hicks set single-season school records with 1,633 rushing yards, 162 points scored, and 27 touchdowns. He received first-team All-America honors from USAFOOTBALL.com.

Other key players included quarterback Chad Johnson (Offensive Player of the Year All-Northwest Conference) and offensive linemen Josh Hostetter (second-team USAFOOTBALL.com All-American) and Andrew Finstuen (second-team Football Gazette NCAA DIII All-American).

Coach Westering was inducted into the College Football Hall of Fame in 2005.

== Schedule ==
Date	Opponent	Site	Result	Attendance	Source
September 11	at Cal Lutheran*	Memorial Field; Thousand Oaks, CA	W 28–26	1,000	
September 25	Southern Oregon*	Carl Sparks Stadium; Puyallup, WA	W 47–23	3,125	
October 2	at Eastern Oregon*	Community Stadium; La Grande, OR	W 41–35		
October 9	at Willamette	McCulloch Stadium; Salem, OR	L 20–29	3,000	
October 16	Whitworth	Carl Sparks Stadium; Puyallup, WA	W 33–7	3,900	
October 23	Lewis & Clark	Carl Sparks Stadium; Puyallup, WA	W 63–10	1,000	
October 30	at Linfield	Maxwell Field; McMinville, Oregon	W 56–23	3,000	
November 6	at Simon Fraser*	Terry Fox Field; Burnaby, BC	W 35–13	1,000	
November 13	Puget Sound	Carl Sparks Stadium; Puyallup, WA	W 49–13	3,750	
November 20	at Willamette*	McCulloch Stadium; Salem, OR (NCAA Division III first round)	W 28–24	2,000	
November 27	at Wartburg*	Walston Hoover Stadium; Waverly, IA (NCAA Division III second round)	W 49–14	4,000	
December 4	at Saint John's (MN)*	Clemens Stadium; Collegeville, MN (NCAA Division III quarterfinal)	W 19–9	4,371	
December 11	at Trinity (TX)*	Trinity Football Stadium; San Antonio, TX (NCAA Division III semifinal)	W 49–28	1,500	
December 18	vs. Rowan*	Salem Football Stadium; Salem, VA (Stagg Bowl)	W 42–13	4,101	
*Non-conference game

== Roster ==
- 2 Zach Hiatt E Sr.
- 3 Kevin Lint RB Sr.
- 4 Benji Sonnichsen DB Fr.
- 5 Jonathan Carlson DB So.
- 6 David Krueger PK/P Jr.
- 7 Seth Berghoff DB Fr.
- 8 Chris Blakney DB Fr.
- 9 Shipley Ennis RB Jr.
- 10 Steve Alseth DB Jr.
- 11 Tyler Teeple QB Fr.
- 12 Greg Pace QB Jr.
- 13 Casey Carlson DB Fr.
- 14 Eric Parks QB Fr.
- 15 Mike Ramirez RB Fr.
- 17 Chad Johnson QB Jr.
- 19 Todd McDevitt E Jr.
- 20 Devin Pierce E Fr.
- 21 David Jefferies DB Jr.
- 22 Nate Grygorcewicz DB Jr.
- 23 Jacob Croft RB Sr.
- 24 Judd Hunter DB Sr.
- 25 Luke Balash RB Sr.
- 26 Anthony Hicks RB Sr.
- 27 Tim Holmes DB So.
- 28 David Goodsell LB Jr.
- 29 Scott Sarrensen DB/P So.
- 30 Tate Mathison DB Fr.
- 31 Mike Mauss LB So.
- 32 Kawika McGuire RB Fr.
- 33 Tyler Shillito DB So.
- 34 Chris Pitzer RB Fr.
- 35 Tim Lax LB Sr.
- 38 Luke Gearhard LB Jr.
- 39 Ben Cochran RB So.
- 40 Joe Mertlich LB Fr.
- 41 Jeremy Johnston LB Sr.
- 42 Troy Testerman RB Fr.
- 43 Matt Locher LB Fr.
- 44 Brian Anderson LB Jr.
- 45 Aaron Binger RB Fr.
- 46 Case deVries LB Fr.
- 47 Ian Hanly LB Fr.
- 48 Herb Lehman DL Sr.
- 49 Josh Parsons LB Fr.
- 50 Ben McGrann LB So.
- 51 Steve Yahns OL So.
- 52 Chris Inverso LB Fr.
- 54 Andrew Finstuen OL Sr.
- 55 Josh Hostetter OL Sr.
- 57 Rob Shipp OL Jr.
- 58 Jasen Bennie LB So.
- 60 Robb Dressel OL Fr.
- 61 Jake Allan OL So.
- 62 Trevor Roberts OL So.
- 65 Nate Cogdill OL Fr.
- 66 Eric Arena OL Sr.
- 68 Jeff Reynolds OL Fr.
- 70 Scott Wyckoff OL Jr.
- 71 Micah Morino OL Fr.
- 74 Matt Nichols OL Jr.
- 75 Chuck Woodard OL So.
- 77 Willy Wurster OL Sr.
- 78 Christian Foreman DL Jr.
- 79 Isaac Williams OL Jr.
- 80 Kevin Giboney E So.
- 81 David Weller E Fr.
- 82 Tyler Kechely E Sr.
- 83 Kyle Brown E Fr.
- 84 Paul Smith E So.
- 88 Jess Nelson E Jr.
- 90 Kris Helphinstine DL So.
- 91 John Bailey DL Fr.
- 92 Luke Jacobson DL Sr.
- 95 Rob Case DL Sr.
- 97 Brian Fulker DL So.
- 98 John Eussen DL Sr.
- 99 Andy Armstrong DL Jr.
