= 1962 Parsons Wildcats football team =

American college football season

1962 Parsons Wildcats football

Iowa Conference champion
- Conference: Iowa Conference
- Record: 9–0 (9–0 Iowa)
- Head coach: Frosty Westering (1st season)

1962 Iowa Conference football standings
	Conf.					Overall
Team	W		L		T	W		L		T
No. 10 Parsons $	9	–	0	–	0	9	–	0	–	0
Central (IA)	7	–	2	–	0	7	–	2	–	0
Luther	6	–	2	–	1	6	–	2	–	1
Upper Iowa	6	–	3	–	0	6	–	3	–	0
William Penn	5	–	3	–	1	5	–	3	–	1
Wartburg	5	–	4	–	0	5	–	4	–	0
Buena Vista	3	–	6	–	0	3	–	6	–	0
Dubuque	2	–	7	–	0	2	–	7	–	0
Iowa Wesleyan	1	–	8	–	0	1	–	8	–	0
Simpson (IA)	0	–	9	–	0	0	–	9	–	0
$ – Conference champion; Rankings from NAIA poll

The 1962 Parsons Wildcats football team was an American football team that represented Parsons College of Fairfield, Iowa, as a member of the Iowa Conference during the 1962 NAIA football season. In their first year under head coach Frosty Westering, the Wildcats compiled a perfect 9–0 record, won the Iowa Conference championship, and outscored opponents by a total of 267 to 63. Parsons was ranked tenth in the final National Association of Intercollegiate Athletics (NAIA) poll.

The team won 17 consecutive Iowa conference wins, dating back to the 1961 season, tying a record set by Wartburg from 1958 to 1960. The team's total of 267 also set a new conference scoring record, passing the previous record of 259 points set by Loras in 1950.

Parsons was led on offense by fullback Nat Craddock and halfback Dick Johnson with 897 and 873 rushing yards, respectively. Craddock led the NAIA in scoring with 19 touchdowns for a total of 114 points -- the most points scored by an Iowa college player since 1905. Craddock was selected as a second-team player on the 1962 Little All-America college football team and later played in both the National Football League and Canadian Football League.

Five Parsons players were included on the first team of the 1962 All-Iowa Conference football team: Craddock; Johnson; defensive guard Jerry Kamp; defensive tackle Lou Wilson; and defensive end Jerry Holloway.

== Schedule ==
Date	Opponent	Site	Result	Attendance	Source
September 15	Wartburg	Fairfield, IA	W 26–7	1,500	
September 22	at Upper Iowa	Fayette, IA	W 34–6		
September 29	William Penn	Fairfield, IA	W 19–12	1,800	
October 6	at Central (IA)	Pella, IA	W 6–0		
October 13	Buena Vista	Fairfield, IA	W 44–7		
October 20	at Iowa Wesleyan	Mount Pleasant, IA	W 20–0	2,300	
October 27	at Luther	Decorah, IA	W 25–12		
November 3	Simpson	Fairfield, IA	W 53–13		
November 10	at Dubuque	Dubuque, IA	W 40–6		
