= Lea College =

Private college in Albert Lea, Minnesota, US

Coordinates: 43°39′22″N 93°24′47″W

Lea College was a private liberal arts college that operated from 1965 to 1973 in Albert Lea, Minnesota, United States. Lea was one of several Midwestern colleges established by local civic leaders with the support and encouragement of Parsons College in Fairfield, Iowa. These Parsons "satellite schools" were by-products of the strong growth and apparent success of Parsons during the late 1950s and early 1960s, and all followed the "Parsons Plan" academic model developed at that school. None of the schools, however, was ultimately successful.

== History ==
Planning and fundraising for the new school at Albert Lea, originally intended to be called "Mid-Continent College," began in 1964. An 800-acre (3.2 km^{2}) campus site was obtained on Lake Chapeau west of town, a large new dormitory was constructed, and several older buildings were acquired for college use. The new dormitory was named Christopherson Hall, in honor of Alfred Christopherson, a local banker who was a major college benefactor. Additional dormitory space was provided in the former Hotel Albert building downtown. The Lea College name was adopted in 1965, following a contest. The school opened its doors in 1966.

The "Parsons Plan" academic model employed at Lea was the brainchild of Millard Roberts, who was the president of Parsons College from 1955 to 1967; the multi-faceted plan featured innovative teaching and administrative techniques, and emphasized the recruitment of a geographically and academically diverse student body. Among other characteristics, the "Parsons Plan" schools welcomed unconventional students who had not seen success at other colleges. In the 1960s, the schools were also attended by a substantial number of young men seeking draft deferments that would allow them to avoid military service during the Vietnam War.

At least initially, Lea's reputation and fortunes were strongly tied to those of Parsons, and when Parsons faltered in the late 1960s the prospects for Lea and the other Parsons satellite schools grew bleak. Although the satellite schools ended their relationships with Parsons, they suffered from a lack of funding, high student turnover, and accreditation issues. Ultimately, none of the "Parsons Plan" colleges became economically viable, and all closed by the mid-1970s. Lea College closed in 1973. While the old Hotel Albert was demolished, other campus buildings survive, including the former Lea College Fieldhouse, which is now the Albert Lea City Arena.
