= Hardin–Simmons Cowboys football =

- First season: 1897; 129 years ago (Note: The school did not field a football team from 1964 to 1989. It was relaunched in 1990; 36 years ago.)
- Head coach: Jesse Burleson; 15th season, 116–36 (.763)
- Location: Abilene, Texas
- Stadium: Shelton Stadium
- NCAA division: Division III
- Conference: ASC
- Colors: Purple and gold
- All-time record: 529–278–36 (.649)
- Bowl record: 5–2–1 (.688)

Conference championships
- 13

The Hardin–Simmons Cowboys football team represents Hardin–Simmons University in the sport of college football.

Hardin–Simmons began competing in intercollegiate football in 1897. The program rose to prominence under Frank Kimbrough who compiled a 47–8–3 record (.836) as head coach from 1935 to 1940. Kimbrough's teams played in the 1936 and 1937 Sun Bowls, and his undefeated and untied 1940 team was ranked No. 17 in the final AP Poll.

From 1941 to 1961, the team competed as a member of the Border Conference. During this time, the Cowboys won three conference championships: 1942 (shared with Texas Tech) and 1946 under head coach and College Football Hall of Fame inductee Warren B. Woodson, and 1958 under head coach and College Football Hall of Fame inductee Sammy Baugh. During the period of its membership in the Border Conference, the team appeared in seven bowl games, including a record three bowl games (Grape, Shrine, and Camellia Bowls) for the 1948 team.

From 1960 to 1963, the football program compiled a record of 3–35–1 and was outscored by a total of 999 to 313. In January 1964, the university trustees ordered the elimination of the university football program. The chairman of the board said the move was necessitated by "financial difficulties and losses" in the athletic program.

The school did not field a football team from 1964 to 1989. The football program returned in 1990, but the school now competes at the NCAA Division III level. Jimmie Keeling was the head coach for 21 years from 1990 to 2010, winning 11 American Southwest Conference championships and compiling a record of 172–53 (.764). Jesse Burleson has been the head coach since 2011.

== History ==
=== Conference affiliations ===
- 1926–1935: Texas Conference
- 1936–1940: Independent
- 1941–1961: Border Conference
- 1962–1963: Independent
- 1964–1989: Team disbanded
- 1990–1995: Texas Intercollegiate Athletic Association
- 1996–present: American Southwest Conference

== Postseason appearances ==
=== Bowl games ===
The Hardin–Simmons Cowboys have played in 8 NCAA-sanctioned bowl games with a record of 5–2–1.

Season	Date	Bowl	W/L	Opponent	PF	PA	Coach	Notes
1935	January 1, 1936	Sun Bowl	T	New Mexico A&M	14	14	Frank Kimbrough	notes
1936	January 1, 1937	Sun Bowl	W	Texas Western	34	6	Frank Kimbrough	notes
1942	January 1, 1943	Sun Bowl	L	Second Air Force	7	13	Clark Jarnagin	notes
1946	January 4, 1947	Alamo Bowl	W	Denver	20	0	Warren B. Woodson	notes
1947	January 1, 1948	Harbor Bowl	W	San Diego State	53	0	Warren B. Woodson	
1948	December 11, 1948	Grape Bowl†	T	Pacific (CA)	35	35	Warren B. Woodson	
1948	December 18, 1948	Shrine Bowl	W	Ouachita Baptist	41	12	Warren B. Woodson	
1948	December 30, 1948	Camellia Bowl	W	Wichita State	49	12	Warren B. Woodson	
1958	December 31, 1958	Sun Bowl	L	Wyoming	7	14	Sammy Baugh	notes
Total		9 games	5–2–2		260	106		

† The Grape Bowl is listed in NCAA records, but was not an NCAA-sanctioned bowl game.

=== NCAA Division III playoffs ===
The Cowboys have made fifteen appearances in the NCAA Division III playoffs, with a combined record of 5–14.

Year	Round	Opponent	Result
1999	First Round; Second Round; Quarterfinals	Washington (MO); Washington & Jefferson; Trinity (TX)	W, 28–21; W, 51–3; L, 33–40
2000	Second Round; Quarterfinals; Semifinals	Western Maryland; Trinity (TX); Saint John's (MN)	W, 32–10; W, 33–30; L, 14–38
2001	First Round	Wittenberg	L, 35–38 ^{OT}
2004	Second Round	Mary Hardin–Baylor	L, 28–42
2006	First Round	Mary Hardin–Baylor	L, 21–33
2008	First Round	Mary Hardin–Baylor	L, 35–38
2015	First Round	Mary Hardin–Baylor	L, 19–37
2016	First Round	Linfield	L, 10–24
2017	First Round	Linfield	L, 13–27
2018	First Round	Mary Hardin–Baylor	L, 6–27
2022	First Round	Trinity (TX)	L, 7–14
2023	First Round	Trinity (TX)	L, 6–20
2024	Second Round	Mary Hardin–Baylor	L, 13–17
2025	Second Round	Trinity (TX)	L, 24–34
2026	First Round; Second Round	Texas Lutheran; Calvin	W, 34–31; TBP

=== NAIA Division II playoffs ===
The Cowboys have made five appearances in the NAIA Division II playoffs, with a combined record of 5–5.

Year	Round	Opponent	Result
1992	First Round; Quarterfinals	Howard Payne; Minot State	W, 42–28; L, 14–21
1993	First Round; Quarterfinals; Semifinals	Evangel; Mary (ND); Westminster (PA)	W, 49–21; W, 30–20; L, 0–10
1994	First Round; Quarterfinals	Missouri Valley; Lambuth	W, 48–19; L, 54–57
1995	First Round; Quarterfinals	Howard Payne; Central Washington	W, 17–6; L, 20–40
1996	First Round	Evangel	L, 20–34
