= 1991 Georgetown Tigers football team =

American college football season

1991 Georgetown Tigers football

NAIA Division II champion MSC champion

NAIA Division II Championship Game, W 28–20 vs. Pacific Lutheran
- Conference: Mid-South Conference
- Record: 13–1 (6–0 MSC)
- Head coach: Kevin Donley (10th season)

1991 Mid-South Conference football standings
	Conf.					Overall
Team	W		L		T	W		L		T
No. 2 Georgetown (KY) $^	6	–	0	–	0	13	–	1	–	0
No. 21 Campbellsville	4	–	2	–	0	9	–	2	–	0
Union (KY)	3	–	3	–	0	6	–	4	–	0
Evansville	3	–	3	–	0	5	–	5	–	0
Cumberland (KY)	3	–	3	–	0	4	–	5	–	0
Lambuth	2	–	4	–	0	3	–	7	–	0
Tusculum	0	–	6	–	0	0	–	10	–	0
$ – Conference champion; ^ – NAIA Division II playoff participant; Rankings from NAIA Division II poll

The 1991 Georgetown Tigers football team was an American football team that represented Georgetown College of Georgetown, Kentucky, as a member of the Mid-South Conference (MSC) during the 1991 NAIA Division II football season. In their tenth season under head coach Kevin Donley, the Tigers compiled a 13–1 record (6–0 against conference opponents) and won the NAIA national championship, defeating Pacific Lutheran, 28–20, in the NAIA Championship Game.

== Schedule ==
Date	Opponent	Rank	Site	Result	Attendance	Source
September 14	at Mount St. Joseph*		Oak Hills High; Cincinnati, OH	W 53–14	4,000	
September 21	at Urbana*		Wood State High; Urbana, OH	W 78–25	1,200	
September 28	Hanover*		Hinton Field; Georgetown, KY	W 55–46	2,500	
October 5	at Evansville		Arad McCutchan Stadium; Evansville, IN	W 56–10	3,800	
October 12	Shepherd*		Hinton Field; Georgetown, KY	L 31–34	2,500	
October 19	at Union (KY)		Burch/Nau Field; Barbourville, KY	W 49–26	1,500	
October 26	at Cumberland (KY)		Findley Legion Field; Williamsburg, KY	W 63–7	1,050	
November 2	Tusculum		Hinton Field; Georgetown, KY	W 70–7	4,500	
November 9	Lambuth		Hinton Field; Georgetown, KY	W 77–0	2,500	
November 16	Campbellsville		Hinton Field; Georgetown, KY	W 63–14	6,589	
November 23	No. 3 Eureka*	No. 2	Hinton Field; Georgetown, KY (NAIA Division II first round)	W 42–14	8,326	
December 7	at No. 11 Findlay*	No. 2	Donnell Stadium; Findlay, OH (NAIA Division II quarterfinal)	W 37–19	4,500	
December 14	No. 7 Peru State*	No. 2	Hinton Field; Georgetown, KY (NAIA Division II semifinal)	W 42–28	4,000	
December 21	No. 4 Pacific Lutheran*	No. 2	Hinton Field; Georgetown, KY (NAIA Division II Championship Game)	W 28–20	5,000	
*Non-conference game; Rankings from NAIA Division II Poll released prior to the game
