= 1985 NAIA Division II football season =

American college football season

- Regular season: August–November 1985
- Postseason: November–December 1985
- National Championship: Lincoln Bowl; Tacoma, WA
- Champions: Wisconsin–La Crosse

The 1985 NAIA Division II football season, as part of the 1985 college football season in the United States and the 30th season of college football sponsored by the NAIA, was the 16th season of play of the NAIA's lower division for football.

The season was played from August to November 1985 and culminated in the 1985 NAIA Division II Football National Championship, played at the Lincoln Bowl near the campus of Pacific Lutheran University in Tacoma, Washington.

Wisconsin–La Crosse defeated Pacific Lutheran in the championship game, 24–7, to win their first NAIA national title. The Eagles won all three of their playoff games on the road.

== Conference realignment ==
=== Conference changes ===
- The Columbia Football League began play this season, with the combined football membership of the former Evergreen (NAIA Division I) and Pacific Northwest (NAIA Division II) conferences. The new league had fourteen members from British Columbia, Oregon, and Washington.
- This was the final season for the Hoosier-Buckeye Conference. Most members would later join the NCAA Division III Indiana Collegiate Athletic Conference (now known as the Heartland Collegiate Athletic Conference), which began play in 1990.

=== Membership changes ===
Team	1984 conference	1985 conference
Lewis & Clark	Pacific Northwest	Columbia
Linfield	Pacific Northwest	Columbia
Pacific (OR)	Pacific Northwest	Columbia
Pacific Lutheran	Pacific Northwest	Columbia
Willamette	Pacific Northwest	Columbia

== Conference standings ==
1985 Columbia Football League standings
	Conf.					Overall
Team	W		L		T	W		L		T
Northern Division
No. 3 Pacific Lutheran x^	6	–	0	–	0	10	–	1	–	1
No. 15 Puget Sound	4	–	2	–	0	7	–	2	–	0
Central Washington	3	–	3	–	0	5	–	4	–	0
Simon Fraser	3	–	3	–	0	4	–	5	–	0
Whitworth	3	–	3	–	0	3	–	6	–	0
Western Washington	1	–	4	–	1	2	–	6	–	1
Eastern Oregon	0	–	5	–	1	0	–	8	–	2
Southern Division
No. 5 Linfield x^	6	–	0	–	0	8	–	2	–	0
No. 8 Western Oregon *	5	–	1	–	0	8	–	2	–	0
Willamette	4	–	2	–	0	6	–	2	–	1
Southern Oregon	2	–	3	–	0	2	–	6	–	1
Oregon Tech	1	–	4	–	0	1	–	7	–	0
Lewis & Clark	1	–	5	–	0	3	–	6	–	0
Pacific (OR)	1	–	5	–	0	2	–	7	–	0
x – Division champion/co-champions; * – NAIA Division I playoff participant ^ – NAIA Division II playoff participant; Rankings from NAIA Division I poll for Puget Sound and Western Oregon and NAIA Division II poll for Pacific Lutheran and Linfield

1985 Frontier Conference football standings
	Conf.					Overall
Team	W		L		T	W		L		T
No. 7 Carroll (MT) $^	5	–	1	–	0	8	–	2	–	0
Western Montana	4	–	2	–	0	4	–	5	–	0
Rocky Mountain	2	–	4	–	0	2	–	7	–	0
Montana Tech	1	–	5	–	0	2	–	8	–	0
$ – Conference champion; ^ – NAIA Division II playoff participant; Rankings from NAIA Division II poll

1985 Heart of America Athletic Conference football standings
	Conf.					Overall
Team	W		L		T	W		L		T
No. 10 Baker +	6	–	1	–	0	7	–	2	–	0
No. 16 MidAmerica Nazarene +	6	–	1	–	0	7	–	2	–	0
No. 19 William Jewell +	6	–	1	–	0	7	–	3	–	0
Missouri Valley	3	–	4	–	0	4	–	5	–	0
Graceland	2	–	4	–	1	5	–	4	–	1
Tarkio	2	–	4	–	1	3	–	6	–	1
Culver–Stockton	2	–	5	–	0	2	–	8	–	0
Central Methodist	0	–	7	–	0	2	–	8	–	0
+ – Conference co-champions; Rankings from NAIA Division II poll

1985 Hoosier–Buckeye Conference football standings
	Conf.					Overall
Team	W		L		T	W		L		T
No. 1 Findlay $^	6	–	0	–	0	10	–	1	–	0
No. 11 Bluffton	5	–	1	–	0	8	–	1	–	0
No. 13 Wilmington (OH)	4	–	2	–	0	7	–	2	–	0
Hanover	3	–	3	–	0	5	–	4	–	0
Manchester (IN)	1	–	5	–	0	4	–	5	–	0
Anderson (IN)	1	–	5	–	0	3	–	6	–	0
Defiance	1	–	5	–	0	1	–	8	–	0
$ – Conference champion; ^ – NAIA Division II playoff participant; Rankings from NAIA Division II poll

1985 Illini–Badger Football Conference standings
	Conf.					Overall
Team	W		L		T	W		L		T
Lakeland $	4	–	1	–	0	7	–	2	–	0
Concordia (IL)	3	–	2	–	0	4	–	5	–	0
Eureka	2	–	3	–	0	4	–	5	–	0
Concordia (WI)	2	–	3	–	0	4	–	5	–	0
Northeastern Illinois	2	–	3	–	0	3	–	7	–	0
Principia	1	–	4	–	0	2	–	7	–	0
$ – Conference champion

1985 Kansas Collegiate Athletic Conference football standings
	Conf.					Overall
Team	W		L		T	W		L		T
No. 15 Southwestern (KS) $	8	–	1	–	0	8	–	2	–	0
Bethany (KS)	7	–	2	–	0	7	–	2	–	0
No. 17 Bethel (KS)	7	–	2	–	0	7	–	2	–	0
Sterling	6	–	3	–	0	7	–	3	–	0
Ottawa	5	–	4	–	0	5	–	5	–	0
St. Mary of the Plains	4	–	5	–	0	5	–	5	–	0
Friends	3	–	6	–	0	3	–	6	–	0
Tabor	2	–	7	–	0	2	–	7	–	0
Kansas Wesleyan	2	–	7	–	0	2	–	8	–	0
McPherson	1	–	8	–	0	1	–	8	–	0
$ – Conference champion; Rankings from NAIA Division II poll

1985 Nebraska Intercollegiate Athletic Conference football standings
	Conf.					Overall
Team	W		L		T	W		L		T
No. 14 Midland $	5	–	0	–	0	8	–	2	–	0
Doane	4	–	1	–	0	6	–	3	–	1
Hastings	2	–	3	–	0	7	–	3	–	0
Nebraska Wesleyan	2	–	3	–	0	6	–	5	–	0
Concordia (NE)	2	–	3	–	0	4	–	6	–	0
Dana	0	–	5	–	0	1	–	8	–	0
$ – Conference champion; Rankings from NAIA Division II poll

1985 North Dakota College Athletic Conference football standings
	Conf.					Overall
Team	W		L		T	W		L		T
No. 12 Minot State $	5	–	0	–	0	7	–	1	–	1
No. 18 Dickinson State	4	–	1	–	0	7	–	2	–	0
Valley City State	3	–	2	–	0	5	–	4	–	0
Jamestown	2	–	3	–	0	3	–	5	–	1
Mayville State	1	–	4	–	0	1	–	7	–	0
NDSCS–Wahpeton	0	–	5	–	0	2	–	7	–	0
$ – Conference champion; Rankings from NAIA Division II poll

1985 South Dakota Intercollegiate Conference football standings
	Conf.					Overall
Team	W		L		T	W		L		T
South Dakota Tech $	5	–	1	–	0	6	–	3	–	0
Huron	4	–	2	–	0	6	–	3	–	0
Sioux Falls	4	–	2	–	0	6	–	3	–	1
Dakota Wesleyan	3	–	3	–	0	5	–	5	–	0
Black Hills State	2	–	4	–	0	3	–	7	–	0
Dakota State	0	–	6	–	0	0	–	10	–	0
$ – Conference champion

1985 Texas Intercollegiate Athletic Association football standings
	Conf.					Overall
Team	W		L		T	W		L		T
Austin +	4	–	2	–	0	7	–	3	–	0
Sul Ross +	4	–	2	–	0	5	–	5	–	0
Tarleton State	3	–	3	–	0	3	–	7	–	0
McMurry	1	–	5	–	0	1	–	9	–	0
+ – Conference co-champions

1985 Wisconsin State University Conference football standings
	Conf.					Overall
Team	W		L		T	W		L		T
Wisconsin–River Falls $	6	–	1	–	1	8	–	1	–	1
No. 8 Wisconsin–La Crosse ^	5	–	1	–	2	11	–	1	–	2
Wisconsin–Stevens Point	5	–	2	–	1	8	–	2	–	1
Wisconsin–Platteville	5	–	3	–	0	5	–	5	–	0
Wisconsin–Eau Claire	3	–	4	–	1	5	–	4	–	1
Wisconsin–Whitewater	3	–	4	–	1	3	–	7	–	1
Wisconsin–Oshkosh	2	–	5	–	1	4	–	5	–	1
Wisconsin–Stout	2	–	6	–	0	3	–	7	–	0
Wisconsin–Superior	1	–	6	–	1	2	–	8	–	1
$ – Conference champion; * – NAIA Division II playoff participant; Rankings from NAIA Division II poll

1985 NAIA Division II independents football records
	Conf.			Overall
Team	W	L	T	W		L		T
No. 2 Benedictine (KS) ^		–		10	–	1	–	0
No. 4 Northwestern (IA) ^		–		9	–	1	–	1
No. 9 Azusa Pacific		–		7	–	1	–	1
No. 20 Loras		–		8	–	2	–	1
No. 6 St. Ambrose ^		–		8	–	2	–	1
Texas Lutheran		–		6	–	3	–	0
Chadron State		–		5	–	3	–	1
Geneva		–		5	–	4	–	0
Westminster (PA)		–		5	–	4	–	0
Oklahoma Panhandle State		–		5	–	4	–	1
Evangel		–		4	–	6	–	0
Waynesburg		–		4	–	6	–	0
Peru State		–		3	–	7	–	0
Iowa Wesleyan		–		2	–	7	–	0
Westmar		–		2	–	8	–	0
Cumberland (KY)		–		1	–	9	–	0
^ – NAIA Division II playoff participant; Rankings from NAIA Division II poll

== Conference champions ==
Conference	Champion	Record
Columbia	Northern Division: Pacific Lutheran; Southern Division: Linfield	6–0; 6–0
Frontier	Carroll (MT)	5–1
Heart of America	Baker; MidAmerica Nazarene; William Jewell	6–1
Hoosier-Buckeye	Findlay	6–0
Kansas	Southwestern (KS)	8–1
Nebraska	Midland Lutheran	5–0
North Dakota	Minot State	5–0
South Dakota	South Dakota Tech	5–1
Texas	Austin; Sul Ross	4–2
WSUC	Wisconsin–River Falls	6–1–1

== Postseason ==
Quarterfinals; Campus sites
Wisconsin–La Crosse	24
Carroll (MT)*	0
Northwestern (IA)	32
Benedictine*	22
Linfield	12
Pacific Lutheran*	30
Saint Ambrose	0
Findlay ‡	7

Semifinals; Campus sites
Wisconsin–La Crosse (3OT)	35
Northwestern (IA) ‡‡	28
Pacific Lutheran*	40
Findlay	29

Championship; Tacoma, WA
Wisconsin–La Crosse	24
Pacific Lutheran*	7

- ‡ Game played at Bowling Green, Ohio
- ‡‡ Game played at Vermillion, South Dakota

== See also ==
- 1985 NCAA Division I-A football season
- 1985 NCAA Division I-AA football season
- 1985 NCAA Division II football season
- 1985 NCAA Division III football season
