= Pacific Lutheran Lutes football =

- First season: 1926
- Head coach: Brant McAdams; 8th season, 34–37 (.479)
- Location: Parkland, Washington
- Stadium: Sparks Stadium (capacity: 4,500)
- NCAA division: Division III
- Conference: Northwest
- Colors: Black and gold

NCAA Division III championships
- 1999

NAIA national championships
- NAIA Division II: 1980, 1987, 1993

Conference championships
- 1939, 1940, 1941, 1947, 1953, 1954, 1969, 1971, 1973, 1975, 1979, 1981, 1983, 1985, 1986, 1992, 1993, 1994, 1995, 1998, 2001
- Website: golutes.com

The Pacific Lutheran Lutes football team represents Pacific Lutheran University, located in Parkland, Washington, in NCAA Division III college football.

The Lutes, who began playing football in 1926, compete as members of the Northwest Conference.

PLU play their home games at Sparks Stadium in Puyallup, Washington.

== History ==
=== Conferences ===
- Independent (1926–1937)
- Washington Intercollegiate Conference (1938–1947)
- Evergreen Conference (1948–1965)
- Pacific Northwest Conference (1966–1984)
- Columbia Football League (1985–1987)
- Columbia Football Association (1988–1995)
- Northwest Conference (1996–present)

== Championships ==
=== National championships ===
The Lutes have won four national championships.

Year	Association	Division	Head coach	Record	Opponent	Result
1980	NAIA (3)	Division II (3)	Frosty Westering	11–1 (4–1 NWC)	Wilmington (OH)	W, 38–10
1987	NAIA (3)	Division II (3)	Frosty Westering	11–1–1 (4–1–1 CFL)	Wisconsin–Stevens Point	T, 16–16
1993	NAIA (3)	Division II (3)	Frosty Westering	12–0–1 (5–0 CFA)	Westminster (PA)	W, 50–20
1999	NCAA (1)	Division III (1)	Frosty Westering	13–1 (4–1 NWC)	Rowan	W, 42–13

== Postseason appearances ==
=== NAIA playoffs ===
The Lutes have made fifteen appearances in the NAIA playoffs, with a combined record of 22–12–1 and three national championships.

Year	Round	Opponent	Result
1979	Quarterfinals	Cal Lutheran	L, 14–34
1980	Quarterfinals; Semifinals; National Championship	Linfield; Valley City State; Wilmington (OH)	W, 35–20; W, 32–0; W, 38–10
1981	Quarterfinals	William Jewell	L, 14–19
1983	Quarterfinals; Semifinals; National Championship	Baker (KS); Westminster (PA); Northwestern (IA)	W, 35–3; W, 16–13; L, 21–25
1985	Quarterfinals; Semifinals; National Championship	Linfield; Findlay; Wisconsin–La Crosse	W, 30–12; W, 40–29; L, 7–24
1986	Quarterfinals	Linfield	L, 21–27 ^{OT}
1987	First Round; Quarterfinals; Semifinals; National Championship	Midland; Carroll (MT); Baker (KS); Wisconsin–Stevens Point	W, 40–21; W, 36–26; W, 17–14 ^{OT} T, 16–16
1988	First Round	Oregon Tech	L, 35–56
1990	First Round; Quarterfinals	Concordia Wisconsin; Central Washington	W, 37–9; L, 6–24
1991	First Round; Quarterfinals; Semifinals; National Championship	Central Washington; Linfield; Dickinson State; Georgetown (KY)	W, 27–0; W, 23–0; W, 47–25; L, 20–28
1992	First Round; Quarterfinals	Montana Tech; Linfield	W, 37–0; L, 30–44
1993	First Round; Quarterfinals; Semifinals; National Championship	Cumberland (TN); Central Washington; Baker (KS); Westminster (PA)	W, 61–7; W, 35–17; W, 52–14; W, 50–20
1994	First Round; Quarterfinals; Semifinals; National Championship	Midland; Western Washington; Northwestern (IA); Westminster (PA)	W, 34–14; W, 25–20; W, 28–7; L, 7–27
1995	First Round	Findlay	L, 7–21
1996	First Round	Western Washington	L, 20–21 ^{OT}

=== NCAA Division III playoffs ===
The Lutes have made six appearances in the NCAA Division III playoffs, with a combined record of 8–5 and one national championship.

Year	Round	Opponent	Result
1998	First Round	Saint John's (MN)	L, 20–33
1999	First Round; Second Round; Quarterfinals; Semifinals; Stagg Bowl	Willamette; Wartburg; Saint John's (MN); Trinity (TX); Rowan	W, 28–24; W, 49–14; W, 19–9; W, 49–28; W, 42–13
2000	First Round; Second Round	Bethel (MN); Saint John's (MN)	W, 41–13; L, 21–28 ^{OT}
2001	First Round; Second Round; Quarterfinals	Whitworth; Central (IA); Saint John's (MN)	W, 27–26 ^{OT} W, 27–21 ^{OT} L, 6–31
2012	First Round	Linfield	L, 24–27
2013	First Round	Linfield	L, 21–42
