= 1995 Findlay Oilers football team =

American college football season

1995 Findlay Oilers football

NAIA co-champion MSFA Midwest League co-champion

NAIA Division II Championship Game, T 21–21 vs. Central Washington
- Conference: Mid-States Football Association
- Midwest League
- Record: 10–1–2 (4–1 MSFA)
- Head coach: Dick Strahm (23rd season)
- Home stadium: Donnell Stadium

1995 Mid-States Football Association standings
	Conf.					Overall
Team		W		L			W		L
Mideast League
No. 6 Malone x^	3	–	0	–	1	10	–	1	–	1
No. 11 Geneva ^	3	–	1	–	0	9	–	2	–	0
Westminster (PA)	2	–	1	–	1	4	–	3	–	2
Tiffin	1	–	3	–	0	3	–	6	–	1
Urbana	0	–	4	–	0	0	–	10	–	0
Midwest League
No. 8 Findlay x^	4	–	1	–	0	10	–	1	–	2
Trinity International x	4	–	1	–	0	6	–	4	–	0
Lindenwood	2	–	3	–	0	4	–	7	–	0
Taylor	2	–	3	–	0	4	–	7	–	0
Saint Xavier	2	–	3	–	0	2	–	8	–	0
Olivet Nazarene	1	–	4	–	0	2	–	8	–	0
St. Ambrose *	0	–	0	–	0	6	–	4	–	0
Iowa Wesleyan *	0	–	0	–	0	1	–	10	–	0
x – League champion/co-champions ^ – NAIA Division playoff participant * – ineligible for championship; Rankings from NAIA Division II poll

The 1995 Findlay Oilers football team was an American football team that represented the University of Findlay as a member of the Midwest League within the Mid-States Football Association (MSFA) during the 1995 NAIA Division II football season. In their 23rd season under head coach Dick Strahm, the Oilers compiled a perfect 10–1–2 record (4–1 against conference opponents), outscored opponents by a total of 454 to 114, and was the NAIA Division II national championship, tying with Central Washington, 21–21, in the NAIA Division II Championship Game.

The team played its home games at Donnell Stadium in Findlay, Ohio.

== Schedule ==
Date	Opponent	Site	Result	Attendance	Source
September 9	at Trinity International	Deerfield, OH	L 7–14		
September 16	Westminster (PA)*	Donnell Stadium; Findlay, OH	T 3–3		
September 23	Lindenwood	Donnell Stadium; Findlay, OH	W 63–9		
September 30	at Olivet Nazarene	Bourbonnais, IL	W 42–10		
October 7	Iowa Wesleyan*	Donnell Stadium; Findlay, OH	W 49–14		
October 14	Saint Xavier	Donnell Stadium; Findlay, OH	W 56–0		
October 21	Tiffin*	Donnell Stadium; Findlay, OH	W 42–0		
October 28	at Urbana*	Urbana, OH	W 37–3		
November 11	at Taylor	Upland, IN	W 35–6		
November 18	Pacific Lutheran*	Donnell Stadium; Findlay, OH (NAIA Division II first round)	W 21–14		
December 2	Malone*	Donnell Stadium; Findlay, OH (NAIA Division II quarterfinal)	W 15–7		
December 9	at Lambuth*	L. L. Fonville Field; Jackson, TN (NAIA Division II semifinal)	W 63–13	1,500	
December 16	at Central Washington*	Tacoma Dome; Tacoma, WA (NAIA Division II Championship Game)	T 21–21	5,628	
*Non-conference game
