= 1994 NAIA Division II football season =

American college football season

- Regular season: August–November 1994
- Postseason: November–December 1994
- National Championship: Portland, OR
- Champions: Westminster (PA) (6)

The 1994 NAIA Division II football season, as part of the 1994 college football season in the United States and the 39th season of college football sponsored by the NAIA, was the 25th season of play of the NAIA division II for football.

The season was played from August to November 1994 and culminated in the 1994 NAIA Division II Football National Championship, played in Portland, Oregon.

In a rematch of the 1993 final, the Westminster Titans defeated defending national champion Pacific Lutheran Lutes in the championship game, 27–7, to win their sixth NAIA national title.

== Conference standings ==
1994 Columbia Football Association standings
| | Conf. | | | | | Overall |
| Team | W | | L | | T | W | | L | | T |
|---|---|---|---|---|---|---|---|---|---|---|
Mount Hood League
| No. 1 Linfield x^ | 5 | – | 0 | – | 0 | 8 | – | 2 | – | 0 |
| Willamette | 4 | – | 1 | – | 0 | 7 | – | 2 | – | 0 |
| No. 25 Western Oregon | 3 | – | 2 | – | 0 | 6 | – | 3 | – | 0 |
| Southern Oregon | 2 | – | 3 | – | 0 | 3 | – | 6 | – | 0 |
| Lewis & Clark | 1 | – | 4 | – | 0 | 1 | – | 8 | – | 0 |
| Eastern Oregon | 0 | – | 5 | – | 0 | 1 | – | 8 | – | 0 |
Mount Rainier League
| No. 2 Pacific Lutheran x^ | 5 | – | 0 | – | 0 | 11 | – | 2 | – | 0 |
| No. 9 Western Washington ^ | 4 | – | 1 | – | 0 | 8 | – | 3 | – | 0 |
| Central Washington | 2 | – | 3 | – | 0 | 5 | – | 4 | – | 0 |
| Puget Sound | 2 | – | 3 | – | 0 | 4 | – | 5 | – | 0 |
| Whitworth | 2 | – | 3 | – | 0 | 3 | – | 6 | – | 0 |
| Simon Fraser | 0 | – | 5 | – | 0 | 1 | – | 8 | – | 0 |
x – League champion/co-champions ^ – NAIA Division II playoff participant; Rankings from NAIA Division II poll

1994 Heart of America Athletic Conference football standings
| | Conf. | | | | | Overall |
| Team | W | | L | | T | W | | L | | T |
|---|---|---|---|---|---|---|---|---|---|---|
| No. 13 Missouri Valley $^ | 6 | – | 1 | – | 1 | 7 | – | 3 | – | 1 |
| No. 8 Evangel ^ | 6 | – | 2 | – | 0 | 7 | – | 3 | – | 1 |
| No. 17 Baker | 6 | – | 2 | – | 0 | 8 | – | 3 | – | 0 |
| No. 19 Benedictine (KS) | 6 | – | 2 | – | 0 | 7 | – | 3 | – | 0 |
| MidAmerica Nazarene | 4 | – | 3 | – | 1 | 6 | – | 3 | – | 1 |
| Central Methodist | 2 | – | 6 | – | 0 | 3 | – | 7 | – | 0 |
| Graceland | 2 | – | 6 | – | 0 | 3 | – | 7 | – | 0 |
| Culver–Stockton | 2 | – | 6 | – | 0 | 2 | – | 8 | – | 0 |
| William Jewell | 1 | – | 7 | – | 0 | 1 | – | 9 | – | 0 |
$ – Conference champion; ^ – NAIA Division II playoff participant; Rankings from NAIA Division II poll

1994 Illini–Badger Football Conference standings
| | Conf. | | | | | Overall |
| Team | W | | L | | T | W | | L | | T |
|---|---|---|---|---|---|---|---|---|---|---|
| Quincy $ | 6 | – | 0 | – | 0 | 8 | – | 1 | – | 0 |
| No. 11 Eureka ^ | 5 | – | 1 | – | 0 | 8 | – | 3 | – | 0 |
| Greenville | 2 | – | 4 | – | 0 | 4 | – | 6 | – | 0 |
| Lakeland | 2 | – | 4 | – | 0 | 4 | – | 6 | – | 0 |
| MacMurray | 2 | – | 4 | – | 0 | 4 | – | 6 | – | 0 |
| Concordia (WI) | 2 | – | 4 | – | 0 | 3 | – | 6 | – | 0 |
| Concordia (IL) | 2 | – | 4 | – | 0 | 2 | – | 7 | – | 1 |
$ – Conference champion; ^ – NAIA Division II playoff participant; Rankings from NAIA Division II poll

1994 Kansas Collegiate Athletic Conference football standings
| | Conf. | | | | | Overall |
| Team | W | | L | | T | W | | L | | T |
|---|---|---|---|---|---|---|---|---|---|---|
| No. 18 Friends + | 7 | – | 1 | – | 0 | 8 | – | 2 | – | 0 |
| No. 22 Bethany (KS) + | 7 | – | 1 | – | 0 | 7 | – | 3 | – | 0 |
| Kansas Wesleyan | 6 | – | 2 | – | 0 | 7 | – | 3 | – | 0 |
| Ottawa | 5 | – | 3 | – | 0 | 5 | – | 5 | – | 0 |
| Southwestern (KS) | 5 | – | 3 | – | 0 | 5 | – | 5 | – | 0 |
| Bethel (KS) | 3 | – | 5 | – | 0 | 4 | – | 6 | – | 0 |
| Sterling | 2 | – | 6 | – | 0 | 2 | – | 8 | – | 0 |
| Tabor | 1 | – | 7 | – | 0 | 1 | – | 9 | – | 0 |
| McPherson | 0 | – | 8 | – | 0 | 0 | – | 10 | – | 0 |
+ – Conference co-champions; Rankings from NAIA Division II poll

1994 Mid-South Conference football standings
| | Conf. | | | | | Overall |
| Team | W | | L | | T | W | | L | | T |
|---|---|---|---|---|---|---|---|---|---|---|
| No. 7 Lambuth $^ | 4 | – | 1 | – | 0 | 10 | – | 3 | – | 0 |
| Tusculum | 3 | – | 2 | – | 0 | 7 | – | 3 | – | 0 |
| Union (KY) | 3 | – | 2 | – | 0 | 7 | – | 3 | – | 0 |
| Georgetown (KY) | 3 | – | 2 | – | 0 | 3 | – | 6 | – | 0 |
| Cumberland (KY) | 1 | – | 4 | – | 0 | 5 | – | 5 | – | 0 |
| Campbellsville | 1 | – | 4 | – | 0 | 3 | – | 7 | – | 0 |
$ – Conference champion; ^ – NAIA Division II playoff participant; Rankings from NAIA Division II poll

1994 Mid-States Football Association standings
| | Conf. | | | | | Overall |
| Team | | W | | L | | | W | | L |
|---|---|---|---|---|---|---|---|---|---|---|
Mideast League
| No. 3 Westminster (PA) x^ | 4 | – | 0 | – | 0 | 12 | – | 1 | – | 0 |
| Malone | 2 | – | 2 | – | 0 | 7 | – | 3 | – | 0 |
| No. 16 Tiffin ^ | 2 | – | 2 | – | 0 | 8 | – | 4 | – | 0 |
| Geneva | 2 | – | 2 | – | 0 | 6 | – | 3 | – | 0 |
| Urbana | 0 | – | 4 | – | 0 | 3 | – | 7 | – | 0 |
Midwest League
| No. 14 Trinity (IL) x^ | 5 | – | 0 | – | 0 | 7 | – | 3 | – | 1 |
| No. 15 Findlay ^ | 4 | – | 1 | – | 0 | 6 | – | 4 | – | 0 |
| Taylor | 2 | – | 3 | – | 0 | 3 | – | 7 | – | 0 |
| Olivet Nazarene | 2 | – | 3 | – | 0 | 2 | – | 8 | – | 0 |
| Saint Xavier | 2 | – | 3 | – | 0 | 2 | – | 8 | – | 0 |
| Lindenwood | 0 | – | 5 | – | 0 | 2 | – | 8 | – | 0 |
x – League champion/co-champions ^ – NAIA playoff participant; Rankings from NAIA Division II poll

1994 Nebraska-Iowa Athletic Conference football standings
| | Conf. | | | | | Overall |
| Team | W | | L | | T | W | | L | | T |
|---|---|---|---|---|---|---|---|---|---|---|
| No. 4 Northwestern (IA) $^ | 6 | – | 0 | – | 0 | 10 | – | 2 | – | 0 |
| No. 10 Midland ^ | 5 | – | 1 | – | 0 | 8 | – | 3 | – | 0 |
| No. 20 Hastings | 4 | – | 2 | – | 0 | 7 | – | 3 | – | 0 |
| Doane | 3 | – | 3 | – | 0 | 4 | – | 5 | – | 0 |
| Nebraska Wesleyan | 2 | – | 4 | – | 0 | 3 | – | 7 | – | 0 |
| Dana | 1 | – | 5 | – | 0 | 2 | – | 7 | – | 0 |
| Concordia (NE) | 0 | – | 6 | – | 0 | 2 | – | 7 | – | 0 |
$ – Conference champion; ^ – NAIA Division II playoff participant; Rankings from NAIA Division II poll

1994 North Dakota College Athletic Conference football standings
| | Conf. | | | | | Overall |
| Team | W | | L | | T | W | | L | | T |
|---|---|---|---|---|---|---|---|---|---|---|
| No. 5 Minot State +^ | 4 | – | 1 | – | 0 | 8 | – | 3 | – | 0 |
| No. 24 Dickinson State + | 4 | – | 1 | – | 0 | 6 | – | 3 | – | 0 |
| Jamestown | 3 | – | 2 | – | 0 | 6 | – | 3 | – | 0 |
| No. 21 Mary | 3 | – | 2 | – | 0 | 6 | – | 3 | – | 0 |
| Valley City State | 1 | – | 4 | – | 0 | 3 | – | 6 | – | 0 |
| Mayville State | 0 | – | 5 | – | 0 | 2 | – | 7 | – | 0 |
+ – Conference co-champions; ^ – NAIA Division II playoff participant; Rankings from NAIA Division II poll

1994 South Dakota Intercollegiate Conference football standings
| | Conf. | | | | | Overall |
| Team | W | | L | | T | W | | L | | T |
|---|---|---|---|---|---|---|---|---|---|---|
| No. 12 Sioux Falls +^ | 4 | – | 1 | – | 0 | 8 | – | 3 | – | 0 |
| Dakota Wesleyan + | 4 | – | 1 | – | 0 | 6 | – | 4 | – | 0 |
| Black Hills State | 3 | – | 2 | – | 0 | 6 | – | 4 | – | 0 |
| Huron | 2 | – | 3 | – | 0 | 3 | – | 6 | – | 0 |
| Dakota State | 1 | – | 4 | – | 0 | 3 | – | 7 | – | 0 |
| South Dakota Tech | 1 | – | 4 | – | 0 | 2 | – | 7 | – | 0 |
+ – Conference co-champions; ^ – NAIA Division II playoff participant; Rankings from NAIA Division II poll

1994 Texas Intercollegiate Athletic Association football standings
| | Conf. | | | | | Overall |
| Team | W | | L | | T | W | | L | | T |
|---|---|---|---|---|---|---|---|---|---|---|
| No. 6 Hardin–Simmons +^ | 4 | – | 1 | – | 0 | 8 | – | 3 | – | 0 |
| No. 23 Howard Payne + | 4 | – | 1 | – | 0 | 7 | – | 3 | – | 0 |
| Midwestern State + | 4 | – | 1 | – | 0 | 5 | – | 5 | – | 0 |
| Austin | 2 | – | 3 | – | 0 | 4 | – | 6 | – | 0 |
| McMurry | 1 | – | 4 | – | 0 | 3 | – | 6 | – | 0 |
| Sul Ross | 0 | – | 5 | – | 0 | 0 | – | 10 | – | 0 |
$ – Conference champion; ^ – NAIA Division II playoff participant; Rankings from NAIA Division II poll

1994 NAIA Division II independents football records
| | Conf. | | | Overall |
| Team | W | L | T | W | | L | | T |
|---|---|---|---|---|---|---|---|---|
| Clinch Valley | | – | | 6 | – | 4 | – | 0 |
| Oklahoma Panhandle State | | – | | 6 | – | 4 | – | 1 |
| Azusa Pacific | | – | | 3 | – | 6 | – | 0 |
| Peru State | | – | | 3 | – | 7 | – | 0 |
| St. Ambrose | | – | | 3 | – | 7 | – | 0 |
| Sue Bennett | | – | | 0 | – | 8 | – | 0 |

== Conference champions ==
| Conference | Champion | Record |
|---|---|---|
| Columbia | Mount Rainier League: Pacific Lutheran; Mount Hood League: Linfield | 5–0; 5–0 |
| Heart of America | Missouri Valley | 6–1–1 |
| Kansas | Bethany; Friends | 7–1 |
| Mid-South | Lambuth | 4–1 |
| Mid-States | Mideast Division: Westminster (PA); Midwest Division: Trinity International | 4–0; 5–0 |
| Nebraska-Iowa | Northwestern (IA) | 6–0 |
| North Dakota | Dickinson State; Minot State | 4–1 |
| South Dakota | Dakota Wesleyan; Sioux Falls | 4–1 |
| Texas | Hardin–Simmons; Howard Payne; Midwestern State | 4–1 |

== Postseason ==
First Round; Campus sites
Westminster (PA)* | 41
Findlay | 30
Tiffin* | 41
Eureka | 14
Hardin–Simmons* | 49
Missouri Valley | 21
Lambuth* | 48
Evangel | 19
Minot State* | 20
Sioux Falls | 13
Northwestern (IA)* | 38
Trinity (IL) | 20
Linfield* | 2
Western Washington | 21
Midland* | 14
Pacific Lutheran | 34

Quarterfinals; Campus sites
Westminster (PA)* | 42
Tiffin | 14
Hardin–Simmons* | 54
Lambuth | 57
Minot State | 26
Northwestern (IA)* | 28
Western Washington | 20
Pacific Lutheran ‡ | 25

Semifinals; Campus sites
Westminster (PA)* | 46
Lambuth | 6
Northwestern (IA) | 7
Pacific Lutheran ‡ | 28

Championship; Portland, OR
Westminster (PA) | 27
Pacific Lutheran | 7

- ‡ Game played at Puyallup, Washington

== See also ==
- 1994 NCAA Division I-A football season
- 1994 NCAA Division I-AA football season
- 1994 NCAA Division II football season
- 1994 NCAA Division III football season
