= Central Washington Wildcats football =

Division II football team

2025 Central Washington Wildcats football team
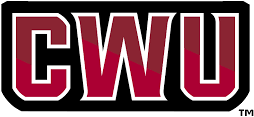
- First season: 1901; 125 years ago
- Athletic director: Dr. Dennis Francois
- Head coach: Scott Power; 1st season, 0–0 (–)
- Location: Ellensburg, Washington
- Stadium: Tomlinson Stadium (capacity: 4,000)
- Conference: Lone Star Conference
- Colors: Crimson and black
- All-time record: 489–338–26 (.589)

NAIA national championships
- NAIA Division II: 1995

Conference championships
- 32
- Consensus All-Americans: 31
- Website: wildcatsports.com/football

The Central Washington Wildcats program represents Central Washington University in college football at the NCAA Division II level. The Wildcats are normally members of the Great Northwest Athletic Conference, but when that conference dropped football after the 2021 season, they joined the Lone Star Conference as football-only members. Formerly an NAIA program, Central Washington moved up to NCAA Division II in 1999.

== Conference affiliations ==
- 1901–1921: Independent
- 1922–1937: Tri-Normal Conference
- 1938–1947: Washington Intercollegiate Conference
- 1948–1984: Evergreen Conference
- 1985–1986: Columbia Football League
- 1987–2000: Columbia Football Association
- 2001–2005: Great Northwest Athletic Conference
- 2006–2007: North Central Intercollegiate Athletic Conference
- 2008–2021: Great Northwest Athletic Conference
- 2022–present: Lone Star Conference

== Championships ==
=== National championships ===
The Wildcats have one claimed national championship.

Year	Association	Division	Head coach	Record	Opponent	Result
1995	NAIA (1)	Division II (1)	Jeff Zenisek	10–3–1 (4–1 CFA)	Findlay	T, 21–21

== Playoff appearances ==
=== NCAA Division II ===
The Wildcats have made ten appearances in the NCAA Division II playoffs, with a combined record of 5–9.

Year	Round	Opponent	Result
2002	First Round	UC Davis	L, 6–24
2007	First Round; Second Round; Regional Final	Ashland; Nebraska–Omaha; Grand Valley State	W, 40–24; W, 20–17; L, 21–41
2008	First Round	West Texas A&M	L, 42–49
2009	Second Round; Regional Final	Tarleton State; NW Missouri State	W, 27–6; L, 20–21
2017	Second Round	Texas A&M–Commerce	L, 31–34 ^{2OT}
2021	First Round	NW Missouri State	L, 21–50
2023	First Round; Second Round; Regional Finals	Western Colorado; Bemidji State; Colorado Mines	W, 16–13 ^{OT} W, 21–17; L, 14–38
2024	First Round	Western Colorado	L, 21–28
2025	First Round	Western Colorado	L, 20–27
2026	First Round	Western Colorado	TBP

=== NAIA ===
The Wildcats made nine appearances in the NAIA playoffs, with a combined record of 10–8–1.

Year	Round	Opponent	Result
1984	Quarterfinals; Semifinals	East Central; Central Arkansas	W, 22–20; L, 6–44
1987	First Round	Southern Oregon	L, 14–21
1988	First Round	Carroll (MT)	L, 7–28
1989	First Round; Quarterfinals; Semifinals	Lewis & Clark; Dickinson State; Westminster (PA)	W, 51–0; W, 49–7; L, 10–21
1990	First Round; Quarterfinals; Semifinals	Greenville; Pacific Lutheran; Westminster (PA)	W, 43–13; W, 24–6; L, 17–24
1991	First Round	Pacific Lutheran	L, 0–27
1993	First Round; Quarterfinals	Linfield; Pacific Lutheran	W, 28–26; L, 17–35
1995	First Round; Quarterfinals; Semifinals; National Championship	Western Washington; Hardin–Simmons; Mary (ND); Findlay	W, 28–21; W, 40–20; W, 48–7; T, 21–21
1998	First Round; Quarterfinals	Rocky Mountain; Azusa Pacific	W, 41–38 ^{OT} L, 28–35

== Stadium ==
The Central Washington Wildcats have played their home games at Tomlinson Stadium since its construction in 1959 (Field named to Steve Hertling Field in 2024). The current permanent capacity of the stadium is 4,000.

== Notable players ==
- Beau Baldwin
- Jon Kitna
- Mike Reilly
- John Zamberlin
- Adam Bighill
- Chase DeMoore
- Nolan Teasley
