= 1993 NAIA Division II football season =

American college football season

- Regular season: August–November 1993
- Postseason: November–December 1993
- National Championship: Portland, OR
- Champions: Pacific Lutheran (3)

The 1993 NAIA Division II football season, as part of the 1993 college football season in the United States and the 38th season of college football sponsored by the NAIA, was the 24th season of play of the NAIA division II for football.

The season was played from August to November 1993 and culminated in the 1993 NAIA Division II Football National Championship, played at Civic Stadium in Portland, Oregon.

The Pacific Lutheran Lutes, led by head coach Frosty Westering, defeated the Westminster Titans in the championship game, 50–20, to win their third NAIA national title. All-American's Marc Weekly, Chad Barnett, Jeff Douglass and Gavin Stanley led the number one ranked offense in the country to a 50-point performance. Pacific Lutheran's offense averaged over 40 points per game in 1993. PLU's 'Big Play' defense was led by linebackers Ted Riddall, Jon Rubey and Judd Benedick while Albert Jackson and Jason Thiel head up the defensive line. Pacific Lutheran began the season ranked number one in the country and finished the season on top in historic style.

== Conference standings ==
1993 Columbia Football Association standings
	Conf.					Overall
Team	W		L		T	W		L		T
Mount Hood League
No. 12 Linfield x^	4	–	1	–	0	6	–	3	–	1
Willamette	3	–	2	–	0	5	–	4	–	0
Southern Oregon	3	–	2	–	0	4	–	5	–	0
Eastern Oregon	2	–	3	–	0	4	–	5	–	0
Lewis & Clark	2	–	3	–	0	4	–	5	–	0
Western Oregon	1	–	4	–	0	3	–	5	–	1
Mount Rainier League
No. 1 Pacific Lutheran x^	5	–	0	–	0	12	–	0	–	1
No. 3 Central Washington ^	4	–	1	–	0	9	–	2	–	0
No. 19 Western Washington	3	–	2	–	0	6	–	3	–	0
Simon Fraser	2	–	3	–	0	3	–	7	–	0
Whitworth	1	–	4	–	0	1	–	8	–	0
Puget Sound	0	–	5	–	0	0	–	8	–	1
x – League champion/co-champions ^ – NAIA Division II playoff participant; Rankings from NAIA Division II poll

1993 Heart of America Athletic Conference football standings
	Conf.					Overall
Team	W		L		T	W		L		T
No. 10 Baker +^	7	–	1	–	0	10	–	3	–	0
No. 8 Evangel +^	7	–	1	–	0	8	–	2	–	0
No. 20 Missouri Valley	6	–	2	–	0	7	–	3	–	0
No. 22 Benedictine (KS)	5	–	3	–	0	6	–	3	–	0
Graceland	5	–	3	–	0	6	–	4	–	0
William Jewell	3	–	5	–	0	3	–	7	–	0
Culver–Stockton	2	–	6	–	0	2	–	8	–	0
MidAmerica Nazarene	1	–	7	–	0	2	–	8	–	0
Central Methodist	0	–	8	–	0	0	–	10	–	0
+ – Conference co-champions; ^ – NAIA Division II playoff participant; Rankings from NAIA Division II poll

1993 Illini–Badger Football Conference standings
	Conf.					Overall
Team	W		L		T	W		L		T
Quincy $	6	–	0	–	0	9	–	0	–	0
Greenville	5	–	1	–	0	8	–	2	–	0
MacMurray	3	–	3	–	0	6	–	4	–	0
Concordia (WI)	3	–	3	–	0	5	–	4	–	0
Eureka	3	–	3	–	0	3	–	7	–	0
Lakeland	1	–	5	–	0	1	–	9	–	0
Concordia (IL)	0	–	6	–	0	0	–	10	–	0
$ – Conference champion

1993 Kansas Collegiate Athletic Conference football standings
	Conf.					Overall
Team	W		L		T	W		L		T
No. 15 Bethany (KS) $^	8	–	0	–	0	9	–	2	–	0
Sterling	6	–	2	–	0	6	–	4	–	0
Ottawa	5	–	3	–	0	6	–	4	–	0
Tabor	4	–	4	–	0	4	–	4	–	0
Southwestern (KS)	4	–	4	–	0	4	–	5	–	0
Kansas Wesleyan	3	–	5	–	0	4	–	6	–	0
Friends	3	–	5	–	0	4	–	6	–	0
Bethel (KS)	3	–	5	–	0	3	–	6	–	0
McPherson	0	–	8	–	0	0	–	8	–	0
$ – Conference champion; ^ – NAIA Division II playoff participant; Rankings from NAIA Division II poll

1993 Mid-South Conference football standings
	Conf.					Overall
Team	W		L		T	W		L		T
No. 17 Georgetown (KY) $^	4	–	1	–	0	7	–	4	–	0
Lambuth	3	–	2	–	0	6	–	4	–	0
Tusculum	2	–	3	–	0	5	–	5	–	0
Union (KY)	2	–	3	–	0	5	–	5	–	0
Cumberland (KY)	2	–	3	–	0	2	–	9	–	0
Campbellsville	1	–	4	–	0	2	–	9	–	0
$ – Conference champion; ^ – NAIA Division II playoff participant; Rankings from NAIA Division II poll

1993 Nebraska-Iowa Athletic Conference football standings
	Conf.					Overall
Team	W		L		T	W		L		T
No. 2 Doane $^	6	–	0	–	0	10	–	1	–	0
No. 5 Hastings ^	5	–	1	–	0	9	–	2	–	0
No. 24 Nebraska Wesleyan	4	–	2	–	0	7	–	3	–	0
Midland	3	–	3	–	0	6	–	4	–	0
Northwestern (IA)	2	–	4	–	0	5	–	5	–	0
Dana	1	–	5	–	0	1	–	9	–	0
Concordia (NE)	0	–	6	–	0	2	–	7	–	0
$ – Conference champion; ^ – NAIA Division II playoff participant; Rankings from NAIA Division II poll

1993 North Dakota College Athletic Conference football standings
	Conf.					Overall
Team	W		L		T	W		L		T
No. 11 Minot State $^	5	–	0	–	0	6	–	4	–	0
No. 13 Mary ^	4	–	1	–	0	8	–	3	–	0
Dickinson State	3	–	2	–	0	5	–	4	–	0
Mayville State	2	–	3	–	0	3	–	6	–	0
Jamestown	1	–	4	–	0	4	–	5	–	0
Valley City State	0	–	5	–	0	0	–	8	–	1
$ – Conference champion; ^ – NAIA Division II playoff participant; Rankings from NAIA Division II poll

1993 South Dakota Intercollegiate Conference football standings
	Conf.					Overall
Team	W		L		T	W		L		T
No. 23 Black Hills State $	5	–	0	–	0	6	–	4	–	0
No. 25 Dakota State	4	–	1	–	0	8	–	2	–	0
Dakota Wesleyan	3	–	2	–	0	7	–	3	–	0
South Dakota Tech	2	–	3	–	0	3	–	6	–	0
Huron	1	–	4	–	0	1	–	7	–	1
Sioux Falls	0	–	5	–	0	2	–	8	–	0
$ – Conference champion; Rankings from NAIA Division II poll

1993 Texas Intercollegiate Athletic Association football standings
	Conf.					Overall
Team	W		L		T	W		L		T
No. 9 Hardin–Simmons $^	5	–	0	–	0	10	–	3	–	0
No. 18 McMurry	4	–	1	–	0	8	–	2	–	0
Austin	2	–	3	–	0	4	–	6	–	0
Howard Payne	2	–	3	–	0	3	–	7	–	0
Midwestern State	2	–	3	–	0	3	–	6	–	0
Sul Ross	0	–	5	–	0	0	–	9	–	0
$ – Conference champion; ^ – NAIA Division II playoff participant; Rankings from NAIA Division II poll

1993 NAIA Division II independents football records
	Conf.			Overall
Team	W	L	T	W		L		T
No. 14 Cumberland (TN) ^		–		9	–	2	–	0
No. 21 Trinity (IL)		–		8	–	2	–	0
No. 7 Tiffin ^		–		8	–	2	–	1
No. 4 Westminster (PA) ^		–		10	–	3	–	0
No. 6 Findlay ^		–		8	–	3	–	0
Clinch Valley		–		6	–	4	–	0
St. Ambrose		–		6	–	5	–	0
Geneva		–		4	–	5	–	0
Azusa Pacific		–		3	–	6	–	0
Peru State		–		3	–	7	–	0
Lindenwood		–		2	–	8	–	1
Oklahoma Panhandle State		–		1	–	8	–	1
^ – NAIA Division II playoff participant; Rankings from NAIA Division II poll

== Conference champions ==
Conference	Champion	Record
Columbia	Mount Rainier League: Pacific Lutheran; Mount Hood League: Linfield	5–0; 4–1
Heart of America	Baker; Evangel	7–1
Kansas	Bethany	8–0
Mid-South	Georgetown (KY)	4–1
Nebraska-Iowa	Doane	6–0
North Dakota	Minot State	5–0
South Dakota	Black Hills State	5–0
Texas	Hardin–Simmons	5–0

== Postseason ==
First Round; Campus sites
Hastings	19
Baker*	39
Bethany	10
Doane*	17
Central Washington	28
Linfield*	26
Cumberland (TN)	7
Pacific Lutheran ‡	61
Mary*	31
Minot State*	20
Evangel	21
Hardin–Simmons*	49
Westminster (PA)	20
Georgetown (KY)*	13
Tiffin	14
Findlay*	28

Quarterfinals; Campus sites
Baker*	28
Doane	21
Central Washington	17
Pacific Lutheran ‡	35
Mary*	20
Hardin–Simmons	30
Westminster (PA)	24
Findlay*	0

Semifinals; Campus sites
Baker	14
Pacific Lutheran ‡	52
Hardin–Simmons	0
Westminster (PA)*	10

Championship; Portland, OR
Pacific Lutheran	50
Westminster (PA)	20

- ‡ Game played at Puyallup, Washington

== See also ==
- 1993 NCAA Division I-A football season
- 1993 NCAA Division I-AA football season
- 1993 NCAA Division II football season
- 1993 NCAA Division III football season
