= 1995 NAIA Division II football season =

American college football season

- Regular season: August–November 1995
- Postseason: November–December 1995
- National Championship: Tacoma, WA
- Champions: Central Washington; Findlay (3)

The 1995 NAIA Division II football season, as part of the 1995 college football season in the United States and the 40th season of college football sponsored by the NAIA, was the 26th season of play of the NAIA division II for football.

The season was played from August to November 1995 and culminated in the 1995 NAIA Division II Football National Championship, played in Tacoma, Washington.

Central Washington and Findlay played to a 21–21 tie and were named co-national champions. It was the Wildcats' first NAIA national title and the Oilers' third.

== Conference and membership changes ==
=== Conference changes ===
- This was the final season that the NAIA officially recognized a conference champion in football from the Texas Intercollegiate Athletic Association (TIAA). The remaining TIAA members subsequently joined either the NCAA Division II Lone Star Conference or the NCAA Division III American Southwest Conference.

== Conference standings ==
1995 Association of Mideast Colleges football standings
	Conf.					Overall
Team	W		L		T	W		L		T
Thomas More $	3	–	0	–	0	10	–	0	–	0
Mount St. Joseph	1	–	2	–	0	5	–	4	–	0
Bluffton	1	–	2	–	0	5	–	5	–	0
Wilmington (OH)	1	–	2	–	0	2	–	6	–	1
$ – Conference champion

1995 Columbia Football Association standings
	Conf.					Overall
Team	W		L		T	W		L		T
Mount Hood League
No. 15 Pacific Lutheran x^	4	–	0	–	1	6	–	3	–	1
No. 18 Willamette x	4	–	0	–	1	6	–	2	–	1
No. 21 Linfield	3	–	2	–	0	6	–	3	–	0
Puget Sound	2	–	3	–	0	2	–	7	–	0
Lewis & Clark	1	–	4	–	0	5	–	4	–	0
Whitworth	0	–	5	–	0	1	–	8	–	0
Mount Rainier League
No. 1 Western Washington x^	5	–	0	–	0	9	–	1	–	0
No. 14 Central Washington ^	4	–	1	–	0	10	–	3	–	1
Simon Fraser	2	–	3	–	0	4	–	6	–	0
Southern Oregon	2	–	3	–	0	4	–	5	–	0
Western Oregon	1	–	4	–	0	2	–	7	–	0
Eastern Oregon	1	–	4	–	0	1	–	8	–	0
x – League champion/co-champions ^ – NAIA Division II playoff participant; Rankings from NAIA Division II poll

1995 Heart of America Athletic Conference football standings
	Conf.					Overall
Team	W		L		T	W		L		T
No. 3 Benedictine (KS) $^	8	–	0	–	0	9	–	1	–	0
No. 20 Evangel	6	–	1	–	1	6	–	2	–	1
No. 23 MidAmerica Nazarene	5	–	2	–	1	8	–	2	–	1
No. 24 Missouri Valley	5	–	3	–	0	7	–	3	–	0
Culver–Stockton *	3	–	5	–	0	5	–	5	–	0
William Jewell	3	–	5	–	0	3	–	6	–	0
Baker	2	–	6	–	0	3	–	6	–	0
Graceland	2	–	6	–	0	2	–	8	–	0
Central Methodist	1	–	7	–	0	2	–	8	–	0
$ – Conference champion; ^ – NAIA Division II playoff participant * – Includes forfeit win over Kansas Wesleyan; Rankings from NAIA Division II poll

1995 Illini–Badger Football Conference standings
	Conf.					Overall
Team	W		L		T	W		L		T
Eureka $	6	–	0	–	0	9	–	1	–	0
Concordia (WI)	4	–	2	–	0	7	–	2	–	0
Lakeland	4	–	2	–	0	6	–	3	–	1
Quincy	4	–	2	–	0	4	–	6	–	0
Greenville	2	–	4	–	0	2	–	7	–	0
MacMurray	1	–	5	–	0	3	–	7	–	0
Concordia (IL)	0	–	6	–	0	1	–	8	–	0
$ – Conference champion; ^ – NAIA Division II playoff participant

1995 Kansas Collegiate Athletic Conference football standings
	Conf.					Overall
Team	W		L		T	W		L		T
No. 10 Bethany (KS) $^	8	–	0	–	0	10	–	1	–	0
Ottawa	6	–	2	–	0	7	–	3	–	0
Southwestern (KS)	5	–	3	–	0	6	–	4	–	0
Friends	5	–	3	–	0	5	–	4	–	0
Bethel (KS)	4	–	4	–	0	4	–	5	–	0
McPherson	4	–	4	–	0	4	–	6	–	0
Sterling	3	–	5	–	0	3	–	7	–	0
Kansas Wesleyan *	1	–	7	–	0	1	–	9	–	0
Tabor	0	–	8	–	0	0	–	10	–	0
$ – Conference champion; ^ – NAIA Division II playoff participant * – Kansas Wesleyan forfeited seven victories including conference wins over Ottawa, Friends, Bethel (KS), McPherson, and Sterling.; Rankings from NAIA Division II poll

1995 Mid-South Conference football standings
	Conf.					Overall
Team	W		L		T	W		L		T
No. 4 Lambuth $^	7	–	0	–	1	10	–	1	–	1
No. 16 Union (KY)	6	–	1	–	1	7	–	2	–	1
Georgetown (KY)	6	–	2	–	0	6	–	4	–	0
Cumberland (KY)	5	–	3	–	0	6	–	4	–	0
Cumberland (TN)	4	–	4	–	0	4	–	6	–	0
Tusculum	3	–	5	–	0	3	–	6	–	0
Campbellsville	2	–	6	–	0	3	–	8	–	0
North Greenville	2	–	6	–	0	5	–	6	–	0
Bethel (TN)	0	–	8	–	0	0	–	10	–	0
$ – Conference champion; ^ – NAIA Division II playoff participant; Rankings from NAIA Division II poll

1995 Mid-States Football Association standings
	Conf.					Overall
Team		W		L			W		L
Mideast League
No. 6 Malone x^	3	–	0	–	1	10	–	1	–	1
No. 11 Geneva ^	3	–	1	–	0	9	–	2	–	0
Westminster (PA)	2	–	1	–	1	4	–	3	–	2
Tiffin	1	–	3	–	0	3	–	6	–	1
Urbana	0	–	4	–	0	0	–	10	–	0
Midwest League
No. 8 Findlay x^	4	–	1	–	0	10	–	1	–	2
Trinity International x	4	–	1	–	0	6	–	4	–	0
Lindenwood	2	–	3	–	0	4	–	7	–	0
Taylor	2	–	3	–	0	4	–	7	–	0
Saint Xavier	2	–	3	–	0	2	–	8	–	0
Olivet Nazarene	1	–	4	–	0	2	–	8	–	0
St. Ambrose *	0	–	0	–	0	6	–	4	–	0
Iowa Wesleyan *	0	–	0	–	0	1	–	10	–	0
x – League champion/co-champions ^ – NAIA Division playoff participant * – ineligible for championship; Rankings from NAIA Division II poll

1995 Nebraska-Iowa Athletic Conference football standings
	Conf.					Overall
Team	W		L		T	W		L		T
No. 17 Hastings $^	5	–	1	–	0	7	–	2	–	1
No. 19 Northwestern (IA)	4	–	2	–	0	7	–	3	–	0
Dana	3	–	3	–	0	6	–	4	–	0
Midland	3	–	3	–	0	6	–	4	–	0
Doane	3	–	3	–	0	3	–	6	–	0
Nebraska Wesleyan	2	–	4	–	0	3	–	7	–	0
Concordia (NE)	1	–	5	–	0	3	–	6	–	0
$ – Conference champion; ^ – NAIA Division II playoff participant; Rankings from NAIA Division II poll

1995 North Dakota College Athletic Conference football standings
	Conf.					Overall
Team	W		L		T	W		L		T
No. 7 Dickinson State $^	6	–	0	–	0	10	–	1	–	0
No. 9 Mary ^	5	–	1	–	0	11	–	2	–	0
Minot State	3	–	3	–	0	5	–	4	–	0
Mayville State	3	–	3	–	0	4	–	5	–	0
Valley City State	2	–	4	–	0	4	–	5	–	0
Jamestown	1	–	5	–	0	3	–	6	–	0
Minnesota–Crookston	1	–	5	–	0	3	–	7	–	0
$ – Conference champion; ^ – NAIA Division II playoff participant; Rankings from NAIA Division II poll

1995 South Dakota Intercollegiate Conference football standings
	Conf.					Overall
Team	W		L		T	W		L		T
No. 2 Sioux Falls $^	5	–	0	–	0	11	–	1	–	0
No. 22 Huron	4	–	1	–	0	8	–	2	–	0
South Dakota Tech	3	–	2	–	0	5	–	5	–	0
Black Hills State	1	–	4	–	0	2	–	8	–	0
Dakota Wesleyan	1	–	4	–	0	1	–	9	–	0
Dakota State	1	–	4	–	0	1	–	9	–	0
$ – Conference champion; ^ – NAIA Division II playoff participant; Rankings from NAIA Division II poll

1995 Texas Intercollegiate Athletic Association football standings
	Conf.					Overall
Team	W		L		T	W		L		T
No. 5 Hardin–Simmons +^	7	–	1	–	0	9	–	2	–	0
No. 13 Howard Payne +^	7	–	1	–	0	7	–	3	–	0
Austin	4	–	4	–	0	4	–	5	–	0
Sul Ross	2	–	6	–	0	3	–	6	–	0
McMurry	0	–	8	–	0	1	–	9	–	0
$ – Conference champion; ^ – NAIA Division II playoff participant; Rankings from NAIA Division II poll

1995 NAIA Division II independents football records
	Conf.			Overall
Team	W	L	T	W		L		T
No. 12 Clinch Valley ^		–		10	–	2	–	0
Azusa Pacific		–		4	–	4	–	1
Peru State		–		3	–	5	–	1
Sue Bennett		–		0	–	11	–	0
^ – NAIA Division II playoff participant; Rankings from NAIA Division II poll

== Conference champions ==
Conference	Champion	Record
Columbia	Mount Rainier League: Western Washington; Mount Hood League: Pacific Lutheran & Willamette	5–0; 4–0–1
Heart of America	Benedictine	8–0
Kansas	Bethany	8–0
Mid-South	Lambuth	7–0–1
Mid-States	Mideast Division: Malone; Midwest Division: Findlay & Trinity International	3–0–1; 4–1
Nebraska-Iowa	Hastings	5–1
North Dakota	Dickinson State	6–0
South Dakota	Sioux Falls	5–0
Texas	Hardin–Simmons; Howard Payne	7–1

== Postseason ==
First Round; Campus sites
Western Washington*	21
Central Washington	28
Hardin–Simmons*	17
Howard Payne	6
Mary*	14
Dickinson State	8
Hastings*	23
Sioux Falls	41
Findlay*	21
Pacific Lutheran	7
Malone*	24
Geneva	23
Benedictine (KS)*	29
Bethany (KS)	30
Lambuth*	49
Clinch Valley	10

Quarterfinals; Campus sites
Central Washington	40
Hardin–Simmons*	20
Mary*	42
Sioux Falls	17
Findlay*	15
Malone	7
Bethany (KS)	28
Lambuth*	63

Semifinals; Campus sites
Central Washington ‡	48
Mary	7
Findlay	63
Lambuth*	13

Championship; Tacoma, WA
Central Washington	21
Findlay	21

- ‡ Game played at Puyallup, Washington

== See also ==
- 1995 NCAA Division I-A football season
- 1995 NCAA Division I-AA football season
- 1995 NCAA Division II football season
- 1995 NCAA Division III football season
