= 1992 NAIA Division II football season =

American college football season

- Regular season: August–November 1992
- Postseason: November–December 1992
- National Championship: Portland, OR
- Champions: Findlay (2)

The 1992 NAIA Division II football season, as part of the 1992 college football season in the United States and the 37th season of college football sponsored by the NAIA, was the 23rd season of play of the NAIA Division II for football.

The season was played from August to November 1992 and culminated in the 1992 NAIA Division II Football National Championship, played in Portland, Oregon near the campus of Linfield College.

Findlay defeated Linfield in the championship game, 26–13, to win their second NAIA national title.

== Conference realignment ==
=== Conference changes ===
- Before the season, the Nebraska Intercollegiate Athletic Conference rebranded as the Nebraska-Iowa Athletic Conference after the addition of Iowa-based Northwestern College. The NIAC had existed under its previous name since its foundation in 1969.

=== Membership changes ===
Team	1991 conference	1992 conference
Northwestern (IA)	NAIA independent	Nebraska-Iowa

== Conference standings ==
1992 Columbia Football Association standings
	Conf.					Overall
Team	W		L		T	W		L		T
Mount Hood League
No. 2 Linfield x^	6	–	0	–	0	12	–	1	–	0
Lewis & Clark	4	–	2	–	0	4	–	5	–	0
Western Oregon	3	–	3	–	0	4	–	5	–	0
Eastern Oregon	3	–	3	–	0	3	–	6	–	0
Southern Oregon	2	–	4	–	0	3	–	6	–	0
Oregon Tech	2	–	4	–	0	2	–	7	–	0
Willamette	1	–	5	–	0	1	–	8	–	0
Mount Rainier League
No. 3 Pacific Lutheran x^	5	–	0	–	0	9	–	2	–	0
No. 15 Western Washington ^	3	–	2	–	0	7	–	3	–	0
No. 21 Central Washington	3	–	2	–	0	6	–	3	–	0
Simon Fraser	3	–	2	–	0	5	–	4	–	0
Puget Sound	1	–	4	–	0	3	–	6	–	0
Whitworth	0	–	5	–	0	2	–	7	–	0
x – League champion/co-champions ^ – NAIA Division II playoff participant; Rankings from NAIA Division II poll

1992 Frontier Conference football standings
	Conf.					Overall
Team	W		L		T	W		L		T
Rocky Mountain +	4	–	2	–	0	8	–	2	–	0
No. 16 Montana Tech +^	4	–	2	–	0	7	–	4	–	0
Carroll (MT)	2	–	4	–	0	4	–	5	–	0
Western Montana	2	–	4	–	0	2	–	6	–	1
$ – Conference champion; ^ – NAIA Division II playoff participant; Rankings from NAIA Division II poll

1992 Heart of America Athletic Conference football standings
	Conf.					Overall
Team	W		L		T	W		L		T
No. 10 Benedictine (KS) +^	7	–	1	–	0	11	–	2	–	0
No. 5 Baker +^	7	–	1	–	0	10	–	2	–	0
No. 23 Evangel	6	–	2	–	0	7	–	3	–	0
William Jewell	5	–	3	–	0	6	–	3	–	0
Missouri Valley	5	–	3	–	0	6	–	4	–	0
Central Methodist	2	–	6	–	0	4	–	6	–	0
Graceland	2	–	6	–	0	3	–	7	–	0
Culver–Stockton	1	–	7	–	0	1	–	8	–	1
MidAmerica Nazarene	1	–	7	–	0	1	–	9	–	0
+ – Conference co-champions; ^ – NAIA Division II playoff participant; Rankings from NAIA Division II poll

1992 Kansas Collegiate Athletic Conference football standings
	Conf.					Overall
Team	W		L		T	W		L		T
No. 14 Friends $^	8	–	0	–	0	8	–	3	–	0
No. 25 Bethany (KS)	7	–	1	–	0	7	–	1	–	1
Ottawa	5	–	3	–	0	5	–	3	–	1
Southwestern (KS)	5	–	3	–	0	5	–	4	–	0
McPherson	3	–	5	–	0	3	–	5	–	0
Kansas Wesleyan	3	–	5	–	0	3	–	7	–	0
Bethel (KS)	2	–	6	–	0	3	–	6	–	0
Sterling	2	–	6	–	0	2	–	7	–	0
Tabor	1	–	7	–	0	1	–	8	–	0
$ – Conference champion; ^ – NAIA Division II playoff participant; Rankings from NAIA Division II poll

1992 Mid-South Conference football standings
	Conf.					Overall
Team	W		L		T	W		L		T
No. 17 Union (KY) +	4	–	1	–	0	8	–	2	–	0
No. 11 Georgetown (KY) +^	4	–	1	–	0	8	–	3	–	0
No. 20 Campbellsville +	4	–	1	–	0	7	–	3	–	0
Tusculum	2	–	3	–	0	4	–	6	–	0
Cumberland (KY)	1	–	4	–	0	3	–	7	–	0
Lambuth	0	–	5	–	0	3	–	7	–	0
+ – Conference co-champions; ^ – NAIA Division II playoff participant; Rankings from NAIA Division II poll

1992 Nebraska-Iowa Athletic Conference football standings
	Conf.					Overall
Team	W		L		T	W		L		T
No. 12 Hastings $^	6	–	0	–	0	8	–	3	–	0
No. 13 Northwestern (IA) ^	4	–	1	–	1	8	–	2	–	1
Nebraska Wesleyan	4	–	2	–	0	6	–	3	–	0
Doane	3	–	2	–	1	5	–	3	–	1
Concordia (NE)	2	–	4	–	0	4	–	6	–	0
Midland	1	–	5	–	0	2	–	8	–	0
Dana	0	–	6	–	0	2	–	8	–	0
$ – Conference champion; ^ – NAIA Division II playoff participant; Rankings from NAIA Division II poll

1992 North Dakota College Athletic Conference football standings
	Conf.					Overall
Team	W		L		T	W		L		T
No. 19 Dickinson State +	4	–	1	–	0	7	–	2	–	0
No. 9 Minot State +^	4	–	1	–	0	9	–	3	–	0
No. 24 Mary +	4	–	1	–	0	7	–	1	–	1
Jamestown	2	–	3	–	0	5	–	4	–	0
Valley City State	1	–	4	–	0	2	–	7	–	0
Mayville State	0	–	5	–	0	1	–	8	–	0
+ – Conference co-champions; ^ – NAIA Division II playoff participant Rocky Mountain forfeited a win over Mary.; Rankings from NAIA Division II poll

1992 South Dakota Intercollegiate Conference football standings
	Conf.					Overall
Team	W		L		T	W		L		T
No. 7 Dakota Wesleyan $^	5	–	0	–	0	10	–	1	–	0
Black Hills State	4	–	1	–	0	4	–	6	–	0
Sioux Falls	2	–	3	–	0	5	–	5	–	0
Huron	2	–	3	–	0	3	–	6	–	0
Dakota State	1	–	4	–	0	5	–	5	–	0
South Dakota Tech	1	–	4	–	0	2	–	7	–	0
$ – Conference champion; ^ – NAIA Division II playoff participant; Rankings from NAIA Division II poll

1992 Texas Intercollegiate Athletic Association football standings
	Conf.					Overall
Team	W		L		T	W		L		T
No. 6 Howard Payne $^	5	–	0	–	0	8	–	3	–	0
No. 8 Hardin–Simmons ^	4	–	1	–	0	10	–	2	–	0
Austin	2	–	3	–	0	6	–	4	–	0
McMurry	2	–	3	–	0	4	–	6	–	0
Midwestern State	1	–	4	–	0	4	–	6	–	0
Sul Ross	1	–	4	–	0	2	–	7	–	0
$ – Conference champion; ^ – NAIA Division II playoff participant; Rankings from NAIA Division II poll

1992 NAIA Division II independents football records
	Conf.			Overall
Team	W	L	T	W		L		T
No. 4 Findlay ^		–		12	–	1	–	0
No. 1 Westminster (PA) ^		–		10	–	1	–	0
No. 18 Peru State		–		7	–	2	–	1
Azusa Pacific		–		4	–	5	–	0
Geneva		–		4	–	5	–	0
Mount St. Joseph		–		4	–	5	–	0
St. Ambrose		–		4	–	6	–	0
Tiffin		–		4	–	6	–	0
Clinch Valley		–		3	–	7	–	0
Trinity (IL)		–		2	–	7	–	1
Cumberland (TN)		–		2	–	8	–	0
Oklahoma Panhandle State		–		2	–	8	–	0
Westmar		–		1	–	8	–	0
Lindenwood		–		1	–	9	–	0
^ – NAIA Division II playoff participant; Rankings from NAIA Division II poll

== Conference champions ==
Conference	Champion	Record
Columbia	Mount Rainier League: Pacific Lutheran; Mount Hood League: Linfield	5–0; 6–0
Frontier	Montana Tech; Montana Western	4–2
Heart of America	Baker; Benedictine	7–1
Kansas	Friends	8–0
Mid-South	Campbellsville; Georgetown (KY); Union (KY)	4–1
Nebraska	Hastings	6–0
North Dakota	Dickinson State; Mary; Minot State	4–1
South Dakota	Dakota Wesleyan	5–0
Texas	Howard Payne	5–0

== Rankings ==
Final NAIA Division II poll rankings:

Rank	Team (first place votes)	Record (thru Nov. 15)	Points
1	Westminster (PA)	9–0	423
2	Linfield	9–0	410
3	Pacific Lutheran	8–1	387
4	Findlay	8–1	372
5	Baker	9–1	341
6	Howard Payne	8–2	321
7	Dakota Wesleyan	10–0	317
8	Hardin–Simmons	9–1	297
9	Minot State	7–2	283
10	Benedictine (KS)	9–1	271
11	Georgetown (KY)	8–2	244
12	Hastings	8–2	243
13	Northwestern (IA)	8–1–1	226
14	Friends	8–2	201
15	Western Washington	7–2	196
16	Montana Tech	7–3	191
17	Union (KY)	8–2	138
18	Peru State	7–2–1	136
19	Dickinson State	7–2	102
20	Campbellsville	7–3	88
21	Central Washington	6–3	79
22	Greenville	7–2	69
23	Evangel	7–3	68
24	Mary	7–1–1	60
25	Bethany (KS)	7–1–1	49

== Postseason ==
First Round; Campus sites
Georgetown (KY)	14
Findlay*	32
Friends (KS)	0
Westminster (PA)*	28
Northwestern (IA)	20
Baker*	21
Hastings	15
Benedictine (KS)*	17
Minot State	31
Dakota Wesleyan*	0
Hardin–Simmons	42
Howard Payne*	28
Montana Tech	0
Pacific Lutheran*	37
Western Washington	0
Linfield*	26

Quarterfinals; Campus sites
Findlay	13
Westminster (PA)*	7
Baker	14
Benedictine (KS)*	21
Minot State	21
Hardin–Simmons*	14
Pacific Lutheran	30
Linfield*	44

Semifinals; Campus sites
Findlay*	27
Benedictine (KS)	24
Minot State	12
Linfield*	47

Championship; Portland, OR
Findlay	26
Linfield*	13

== See also ==
- 1992 NCAA Division I-A football season
- 1992 NCAA Division I-AA football season
- 1992 NCAA Division II football season
- 1992 NCAA Division III football season
