= Columbia Football Association =

Sports organisation

The Columbia Football Association was intercollegiate athletic football-only conference affiliated with the National Association of Intercollegiate Athletics (NAIA). It was composed principally of member schools from the states of Oregon and Washington. From 1988 to 1995, the conference was divided into two separate, geographic divisions, the northern Mount Rainier League (a reference to Mount Rainier in Washington) and the southern Mount Hood League (a reference to Mount Hood in Oregon). After 1995, the conference consolidated into a single division. Former members are currently scattered between NCAA Division II, and NCAA Division III, and the NAIA.

== Champions ==
=== Division format (1988–1995) ===
==== Mount Rainier League ====
- 1988 – Central Washington
- 1989 – Central Washington
- 1990 – Central Washington
- 1991 – Central Washington
- 1992 – Pacific Lutheran
- 1993 – Pacific Lutheran
- 1994 – Pacific Lutheran
- 1995 – Western Washington

==== Mount Hood League ====
- 1988 – Oregon Tech
- 1989 – Lewis & Clark
- 1990 – Southern Oregon
- 1991 – Lewis & Clark and Linfield
- 1992 – Linfield
- 1993 – Linfield
- 1994 – Linfield
- 1995 – Pacific Lutheran and Willamette

=== Single Division (1996–2000) ===
- 1996 – Western Washington
- 1997 – Central Washington and Western Oregon
- 1998 – Central Washington
- 1999 – Western Washington
- 2000 – Central Washington and Western Washington

== Standings ==
1988 Columbia Football Association standings
	Conf.					Overall
Team	W		L		T	W		L		T
Mount Hood League
No. 12 Oregon Tech x^	6	–	0	–	0	9	–	3	–	0
No. 20 Linfield	4	–	2	–	0	7	–	2	–	0
Southern Oregon	3	–	3	–	0	5	–	4	–	0
Pacific (OR)	3	–	3	–	0	3	–	5	–	1
Western Oregon	3	–	3	–	0	3	–	6	–	0
Willamette	2	–	4	–	0	4	–	5	–	0
Eastern Oregon	0	–	6	–	0	0	–	9	–	0
Mount Rainier League
No. 4 Central Washington x^	6	–	0	–	0	9	–	1	–	0
No. 11 Pacific Lutheran ^	5	–	1	–	0	7	–	3	–	0
Puget Sound	4	–	2	–	0	4	–	5	–	0
Western Washington	3	–	3	–	0	5	–	4	–	0
Whitworth	1	–	5	–	0	3	–	5	–	1
Simon Fraser	1	–	5	–	0	3	–	7	–	0
Lewis & Clark	1	–	5	–	0	2	–	7	–	0
x – League champion/co-champions ^ – NAIA Division II playoff participant; Rankings from NAIA Division II poll

1989 Columbia Football Association standings
	Conf.					Overall
Team	W		L		T	W		L		T
Mount Hood League
No. 19 Lewis & Clark x^	5	–	1	–	0	7	–	3	–	0
Willamette	4	–	1	–	1	6	–	2	–	1
Southern Oregon	4	–	1	–	1	5	–	3	–	1
Oregon Tech	3	–	2	–	1	5	–	3	–	1
Pacific (OR)	2	–	3	–	1	3	–	5	–	1
Western Oregon	1	–	5	–	0	1	–	7	–	0
Eastern Oregon	0	–	6	–	0	0	–	9	–	0
Mount Rainier League
No. 2 Central Washington x^	5	–	0	–	1	10	–	1	–	1
No. 17 Pacific Lutheran	4	–	1	–	1	6	–	2	–	1
No. 21 Western Washington	4	–	2	–	0	7	–	2	–	0
No. 25 Linfield	4	–	2	–	0	6	–	3	–	0
Simon Fraser	1	–	5	–	0	3	–	6	–	0
Whitworth	1	–	5	–	0	3	–	6	–	0
Puget Sound	1	–	5	–	0	1	–	8	–	0
x – League champion/co-champions ^ – NAIA Division II playoff participant; Rankings from NAIA Division II poll

1990 Columbia Football Association standings
	Conf.					Overall
Team	W		L		T	W		L		T
Mount Hood League
No. 23 Southern Oregon x	6	–	0	–	0	6	–	3	–	0
Lewis & Clark	4	–	1	–	1	5	–	3	–	1
Willamette	3	–	3	–	0	4	–	5	–	0
Eastern Oregon	3	–	3	–	0	3	–	6	–	0
Pacific (OR)	2	–	3	–	1	3	–	5	–	1
Oregon Tech	1	–	5	–	0	1	–	8	–	0
Western Oregon	1	–	5	–	0	1	–	8	–	0
Mount Rainier League
No. 1 Central Washington x^	6	–	0	–	0	11	–	1	–	0
No. 6 Pacific Lutheran ^	5	–	1	–	0	9	–	2	–	0
No. 18 Linfield	4	–	2	–	0	7	–	2	–	0
Whitworth	3	–	3	–	0	6	–	3	–	0
Puget Sound	1	–	5	–	0	4	–	5	–	0
Western Washington	1	–	5	–	0	3	–	6	–	0
Simon Fraser	1	–	5	–	0	2	–	8	–	0
x – League champion/co-champions ^ – NAIA Division II playoff participant; Rankings from NAIA Division II poll

1991 Columbia Football Association standings
	Conf.					Overall
Team	W		L		T	W		L		T
Mount Hood League
No. 12 Lewis & Clark x^	5	–	1	–	0	7	–	2	–	1
No. 9 Linfield x^	5	–	1	–	0	8	–	3	–	0
No. 25 Southern Oregon	4	–	2	–	0	5	–	3	–	1
Oregon Tech	3	–	3	–	0	3	–	6	–	0
Eastern Oregon	2	–	4	–	0	4	–	5	–	0
Willamette	2	–	4	–	0	4	–	5	–	0
Western Oregon	0	–	6	–	0	0	–	9	–	0
Mount Rainier League
No. 1 Central Washington x^	6	–	0	–	0	9	–	1	–	0
No. 4 Pacific Lutheran ^	5	–	1	–	0	11	–	2	–	0
Western Washington	4	–	2	–	0	5	–	3	–	1
Simon Fraser	2	–	4	–	0	4	–	6	–	0
Puget Sound	2	–	4	–	0	3	–	5	–	1
Whitworth	2	–	4	–	0	3	–	6	–	0
Pacific (OR)	0	–	6	–	0	0	–	9	–	0
x – League champion/co-champions ^ – NAIA Division II playoff participant; Rankings from NAIA Division II poll

1992 Columbia Football Association standings
	Conf.					Overall
Team	W		L		T	W		L		T
Mount Hood League
No. 2 Linfield x^	6	–	0	–	0	12	–	1	–	0
Lewis & Clark	4	–	2	–	0	4	–	5	–	0
Western Oregon	3	–	3	–	0	4	–	5	–	0
Eastern Oregon	3	–	3	–	0	3	–	6	–	0
Southern Oregon	2	–	4	–	0	3	–	6	–	0
Oregon Tech	2	–	4	–	0	2	–	7	–	0
Willamette	1	–	5	–	0	1	–	8	–	0
Mount Rainier League
No. 3 Pacific Lutheran x^	5	–	0	–	0	9	–	2	–	0
No. 15 Western Washington ^	3	–	2	–	0	7	–	3	–	0
No. 21 Central Washington	3	–	2	–	0	6	–	3	–	0
Simon Fraser	3	–	2	–	0	5	–	4	–	0
Puget Sound	1	–	4	–	0	3	–	6	–	0
Whitworth	0	–	5	–	0	2	–	7	–	0
x – League champion/co-champions ^ – NAIA Division II playoff participant; Rankings from NAIA Division II poll

1993 Columbia Football Association standings
	Conf.					Overall
Team	W		L		T	W		L		T
Mount Hood League
No. 12 Linfield x^	4	–	1	–	0	6	–	3	–	1
Willamette	3	–	2	–	0	5	–	4	–	0
Southern Oregon	3	–	2	–	0	4	–	5	–	0
Eastern Oregon	2	–	3	–	0	4	–	5	–	0
Lewis & Clark	2	–	3	–	0	4	–	5	–	0
Western Oregon	1	–	4	–	0	3	–	5	–	1
Mount Rainier League
No. 1 Pacific Lutheran x^	5	–	0	–	0	12	–	0	–	1
No. 3 Central Washington ^	4	–	1	–	0	9	–	2	–	0
No. 19 Western Washington	3	–	2	–	0	6	–	3	–	0
Simon Fraser	2	–	3	–	0	3	–	7	–	0
Whitworth	1	–	4	–	0	1	–	8	–	0
Puget Sound	0	–	5	–	0	0	–	8	–	1
x – League champion/co-champions ^ – NAIA Division II playoff participant; Rankings from NAIA Division II poll

1995 Columbia Football Association standings
	Conf.					Overall
Team	W		L		T	W		L		T
Mount Hood League
No. 15 Pacific Lutheran x^	4	–	0	–	1	6	–	3	–	1
No. 18 Willamette x	4	–	0	–	1	6	–	2	–	1
No. 21 Linfield	3	–	2	–	0	6	–	3	–	0
Puget Sound	2	–	3	–	0	2	–	7	–	0
Lewis & Clark	1	–	4	–	0	5	–	4	–	0
Whitworth	0	–	5	–	0	1	–	8	–	0
Mount Rainier League
No. 1 Western Washington x^	5	–	0	–	0	9	–	1	–	0
No. 14 Central Washington ^	4	–	1	–	0	10	–	3	–	1
Simon Fraser	2	–	3	–	0	4	–	6	–	0
Southern Oregon	2	–	3	–	0	4	–	5	–	0
Western Oregon	1	–	4	–	0	2	–	7	–	0
Eastern Oregon	1	–	4	–	0	1	–	8	–	0
x – League champion/co-champions ^ – NAIA Division II playoff participant; Rankings from NAIA Division II poll

1996 Columbia Football Association standings
	Conf.			Overall
Team	W		L	W		L
No. 6 Western Washington $^	4	–	1	11	–	2
Simon Fraser	3	–	2	6	–	4
Central Washington	3	–	2	5	–	5
Eastern Oregon	2	–	3	6	–	4
Western Oregon	2	–	3	3	–	7
Southern Oregon	1	–	4	4	–	6
$ – Conference champion; ^ – NAIA Division II playoff participant; Rankings from NAIA Division II poll

1997 Columbia Football Association standings
	Conf.			Overall
Team	W		L	W		L
No. 13 Western Oregon $^	4	–	1	7	–	3
Central Washington	3	–	2	5	–	4
Southern Oregon	3	–	2	5	–	4
Western Washington	3	–	2	5	–	5
Simon Fraser	1	–	4	2	–	7
Humboldt State	1	–	4	2	–	8
$ – Conference champion; ^ – NAIA playoff participant; Rankings from NAIA poll

1998 Columbia Football Association standings
	Conf.			Overall
Team	W		L	W		L
No. 15 Central Washington $	4	–	1	7	–	4
Western Washington	3	–	2	5	–	5
Humboldt State	3	–	2	4	–	7
Western Oregon	2	–	3	4	–	5
Southern Oregon	2	–	3	4	–	6
Simon Fraser	1	–	4	3	–	6
$ – Conference champion; Rankings from NAIA poll

1999 Columbia Football Association standings
	Conf.			Overall
Team	W		L	W		L
Western Washington $	4	–	0	8	–	3
Western Oregon	3	–	1	5	–	5
Central Washington	2	–	2	4	–	5
Simon Fraser	1	–	3	4	–	6
Humboldt State	0	–	4	3	–	7
$ – Conference champion

2000 Columbia Football Association standings
	Conf.			Overall
Team	W		L	W		L
No. 5 Western Washington +	3	–	1	7	–	3
Central Washington +	3	–	1	5	–	5
Western Oregon	2	–	2	6	–	5
Humboldt State	1	–	3	4	–	7
Simon Fraser	1	–	3	2	–	8
+ – Conference co-champions; Rankings from AFCA West Region poll

== See also ==
- List of defunct college football conferences
- Pacific West Conference, NCAA Division II conference that Columbia Football Association members subsequently joined
- Great Northwest Athletic Conference, NCAA Division II conference with teams in the Pacific Northwest
