= Lewis & Clark River Otters football =

College football program of Lewis & Clark College

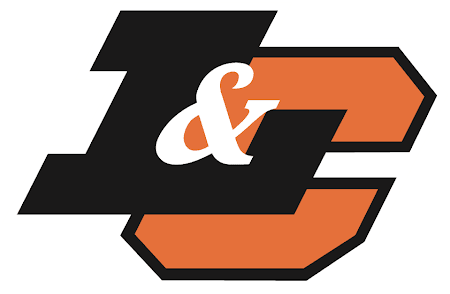
- First season: 1893; 133 years ago
- Head coach: Brett Elliott; 1st season, 6–4 (.600)
- Location: Portland, Oregon
- Stadium: Griswold Stadium (capacity: 3,600)
- Conference: NWC
- Colors
- All-time record: 275–381–12 (.421)
- Mascot: Pio
- Website: golcathletics.com/sports/football

The Lewis & Clark River Otters football team is the college football team of Lewis & Clark College in Portland, Oregon. The team competes in the Northwest Conference in NCAA Division III and plays its home games on campus at Griswold Stadium.

Formerly known as Albany College and based in Albany, Oregon, its football program lost a record 28 consecutive games from 1931 to 1935. The school soon relocated to Portland and the football team has played under the Lewis & Clark name since 1946.

In February 2026, the mascot of Lewis & Clark was changed from the "Pioneers" to the "River Otters".

== Postseason appearances ==
=== NAIA Division II playoffs ===
The Pioneers made two appearances in the NAIA Division II playoffs, with a combined record of 0–2.

Year	Round	Opponent	Result
1989	First Round	Central Washington	L, 0–51
1991	First Round	Linfield	L, 30–59
