= Bob Young (American football coach) =

American football player and coach (1939–2023)

Biographical details
- Born: April 10, 1939; Beresford, South Dakota, U.S.
- Died: January 25, 2023 (aged 83); Brandon, South Dakota, U.S.

Playing career
- 1957–1960: Sioux Falls

Coaching career (HC unless noted)
- 1961–1962: Garretson HS (SD)
- 1962–1963: Hawarden HS (IA) (JV)
- 1970–1979: Maryvale HS (AZ)
- 1983–2004: Sioux Falls

Head coaching record
- Overall: 172–69–3 (college)

Accomplishments and honors

Championships
- 1 NAIA Division II (1996); 9 SDIC (1984, 1988–1989, 1994–1999); 4 GPAC (2001–2004)

Awards
- NAIA Division II Coach of the Year (1996)

Robert R. Young (April 10, 1939 – January 25, 2023) was an American football player and coach, and Christian spiritual leader. A native of Beresford, South Dakota, he served as the head football coach at the University of Sioux Falls from 1983 to 2004, compiling a record of 172–69–3. His 1996 Sioux Falls Cougars team won the NAIA Football Championship. His football teams were also NAIA runners-up in 2001, semifinalists in 1997, 2002, 2003, and quarterfinalists in 1995, 1998, and 2004. Young won nine South Dakota Intercollegiate Conference (SDIC) titles and four Great Plains Athletic Conference (GPAC) titles. His teams ran off conference winning streaks of 27 games from 1994 to 1999 and 34 games from 2001 to 2004. He is the winningest coach in Sioux Falls Cougars football history. Young was considered to be a spiritual leader within the lives of former players, often hosting virtual meetings with them to provide mentoring and spiritual guidance.

== Head coaching record ==
=== College ===
Year	Team	Overall	Conference	Standing	Bowl/playoffs	NAIA^{#}
Sioux Falls Cougars (South Dakota Intercollegiate Conference) (1983–1999)
1983	Sioux Falls	5–4–1	3–3–1	5th		
1984	Sioux Falls	8–2	5–1	1st		
1985	Sioux Falls	6–3–1	4–2	T–2nd		
1986	Sioux Falls	3–7	2–3	T–3rd		
1987	Sioux Falls	3–7	2–3	T–4th		
1988	Sioux Falls	10–1	5–0	1st	L NAIA Division II first round	
1989	Sioux Falls	7–2–1	4–1	T–1st		
1990	Sioux Falls	6–4	3–2	T–2nd		
1991	Sioux Falls	5–5	2–3	T–4th		
1992	Sioux Falls	5–5	2–3	T–3rd		
1993	Sioux Falls	2–8	0–5	6th		
1994	Sioux Falls	8–3	4–1	T–1st	L NAIA Division II first round	
1995	Sioux Falls	11–1	5–0	1st	L NAIA Division II quarterfinal	
1996	Sioux Falls	14–0	6–0	1st	W NAIA Division II championship	
1997	Sioux Falls	11–2	6–0	1st	L NAIA semifinal	
1998	Sioux Falls	8–3	5–0	1st	L NAIA quarterfinal	
1999	Sioux Falls	6–3	5–0	1st		21
Sioux Falls Cougars (Great Plains Athletic Conference) (2000–2004)
2000	Sioux Falls	6–4	5–3	T–3rd		
2001	Sioux Falls	12–2	7–1	T–1st	L NAIA championship	2
2002	Sioux Falls	12–1	8–0	1st	L NAIA semifinal	3
2003	Sioux Falls	12–1	10–0	1st	L NAIA semifinal	3
2004	Sioux Falls	11–1	10–0	1st	L NAIA quarterfinal	5
Sioux Falls:		172–69–3	103–31–1			
Total:		172–69–3				
National championship Conference title Conference division title or championship game berth
