= 2006 NAIA football season =

American college football season

- National Championship: Jim Carroll Stadium; Savannah, TN; December 16, 2006
- Champion: Sioux Falls
- Player of the Year: Brian Kurtz (linebacker, Saint Francis (IN))

The 2006 NAIA football season was the component of the 2006 college football season organized by the National Association of Intercollegiate Athletics (NAIA) in the United States. The season's playoffs, known as the NAIA Football National Championship, culminated with the championship game on December 16, at Jim Carroll Stadium in Savannah, Tennessee. The Sioux Falls Cougars defeated the Saint Francis Cougars, 23–19 in the title game to win the program's second NAIA championship.

== Conference standings ==
2006 Central States Football League standings
	Conf.			Overall
Team	W		L	W		L
No. 21 NW Oklahoma State $*	4	–	0	6	–	4
Texas College	3	–	1	4	–	7
Southern Nazarene	2	–	2	6	–	4
Peru State	1	–	3	6	–	5
Bacone	0	–	4	1	–	9
$ – Conference champion; * – Northwestern Oklahoma State later vacated four wins.; Rankings from NAIA Coaches' Poll

2006 Dakota Athletic Conference football standings
	Conf.			Overall
Team	W		L	W		L
No. 12 Black Hills State $^	7	–	0	8	–	3
No. 14 Jamestown ^	5	–	2	8	–	3
Dickinson State	5	–	2	6	–	4
Valley City State	4	–	3	6	–	4
Minot State	4	–	3	4	–	6
Dakota State	2	–	5	3	–	8
South Dakota Mines	1	–	6	1	–	9
Mayville State	0	–	7	1	–	9
$ – Conference champion; ^ – NAIA playoff participant; Rankings from NAIA Coaches' Poll

2006 Frontier Conference football standings
	Conf.			Overall
Team	W		L	W		L
No. 5 Carroll (MT) $^	9	–	1	11	–	2
No. 11 Montana State–Northern ^	8	–	2	9	–	2
Montana Tech	6	–	4	6	–	5
Eastern Oregon	5	–	5	6	–	5
Rocky Mountain	1	–	9	2	–	9
Montana Western	1	–	9	1	–	9
$ – Conference champion; ^ – NAIA playoff participant; Rankings from NAIA Coaches' Poll

2006 Great Plains Athletic Conference football standings
	Conf.			Overall
Team	W		L	W		L
No. 1 Sioux Falls $^	10	–	0	14	–	0
No. 6 Northwestern (IA) ^	9	–	1	11	–	2
No. 8 Morningside ^	8	–	2	9	–	3
No. 23 Nebraska Wesleyan	7	–	3	7	–	3
Dana	5	–	5	6	–	5
Briar Cliff	4	–	6	5	–	6
Dakota Wesleyan	4	–	6	4	–	6
Hastings	4	–	6	4	–	6
Concordia (NE)	2	–	8	2	–	8
Midland Lutheran	1	–	9	2	–	9
Doane	1	–	9	1	–	9
$ – Conference champion; ^ – NAIA playoff participant; Rankings from NAIA Coaches' Poll

2006 Heart of America Athletic Conference football standings
	Conf.			Overall
Team	W		L	W		L
No. 3 Missouri Valley $^	10	–	0	13	–	1
No. 18 Benedictine (KS)	7	–	3	8	–	3
No. 22 MidAmerica Nazarene	7	–	3	7	–	3
Graceland	6	–	4	6	–	4
William Jewell	5	–	5	5	–	5
Lindenwood	5	–	5	5	–	7
Baker	4	–	6	4	–	6
Evangel	4	–	6	4	–	6
Culver–Stockton	3	–	7	3	–	8
Avila	2	–	8	3	–	8
Central Methodist	2	–	8	3	–	8
$ – Conference champion; ^ – NAIA playoff participant; Rankings from NAIA Coaches' Poll

2006 Kansas Collegiate Athletic Conference football standings
	Conf.			Overall
Team	W		L	W		L
No. 15 Bethel (KS) +^	8	–	1	9	–	2
No. 13 Friends +^	8	–	1	9	–	2
No. 20 Kansas Wesleyan	7	–	2	8	–	2
No. 25 Sterling	7	–	2	7	–	3
Tabor	5	–	4	6	–	4
McPherson	3	–	6	3	–	7
Saint Mary (KS)	2	–	7	3	–	7
Bethany (KS)	2	–	7	2	–	8
Southwestern (KS)	2	–	7	2	–	8
Ottawa	1	–	8	1	–	9
+ – Conference co-champions; ^ – NAIA playoff participant; Rankings from NAIA Coaches' Poll

2006 Mid-South Conference football standings
	Conf.			Overall
Team	W		L	W		L
East Division
No. 10 Georgetown (KY) x^	5	–	0	9	–	2
No. 24 Virginia–Wise	3	–	2	8	–	3
Cumberlands (KY)	3	–	2	6	–	4
Pikeville	2	–	3	4	–	6
Union (KY)	1	–	4	2	–	8
West Virginia Tech	1	–	4	1	–	10
West Division
No. 7 Bethel (TN) x^†	5	–	0	10	–	3
Belhaven	4	–	1	6	–	5
Shorter	3	–	2	6	–	5
Lambuth	1	–	4	4	–	7
Cumberland (TN)	1	–	4	3	–	7
Campbellsville	1	–	4	2	–	8
x – Division champion/co-champions; ^ – NAIA playoff participant † – Bethel forfeited all ten wins, including games against seven Mid-South teams.; Rankings from NAIA Coaches' Poll

2006 Mid-States Football Association standings
	Conf.			Overall
Team	W		L	W		L
Mideast League
No. 2 St. Francis (IN) x^	6	–	0	13	–	1
No. 16 Walsh ^	4	–	2	9	–	3
No. 17 Ohio Dominican	4	–	2	7	–	3
No. 19 Malone	4	–	2	7	–	4
Geneva	2	–	4	4	–	5
Urbana	1	–	5	5	–	6
Taylor	0	–	6	1	–	9
Midwest League
No. 9 St. Ambrose x^	8	–	0	10	–	1
No. 4 Saint Xavier ^	7	–	1	10	–	3
McKendree	5	–	3	5	–	4
William Penn	5	–	3	5	–	6
Quincy	4	–	4	6	–	5
Olivet Nazarene	3	–	5	4	–	7
Trinity International	3	–	5	4	–	7
St. Francis (IL)	1	–	7	1	–	9
Iowa Wesleyan	0	–	8	1	–	9
x – League champion/co-champions ^ – NAIA playoff participant; Rankings from NAIA Coaches' Poll

2006 NAIA independents football records
	Conf.			Overall
Team	W		L	W		L
Webber International		–		5	–	5
Langston		–		5	–	4
Southern Oregon		–		3	–	6
Azusa Pacific		–		3	–	7
Paul Quinn		–		2	–	6
Southern Virginia *		–		2	–	7
SAGU		–		2	–	8
Waldorf		–		2	–	8
Haskell		–		2	–	9
Seton Hill		–		2	–	9
Edward Waters		–		1	–	9
* – Southern Virginia later forfeited a win.
