= List of South Dakota Intercollegiate Conference football standings (1956–1999) =

This is a list of yearly South Dakota Intercollegiate Conference football standings.

== South Dakota Intercollegiate Conference football standings ==
=== NAIA (1956–1969) ===
1956 South Dakota Intercollegiate Conference football standings
	Conf.					Overall
Team	W		L		T	W		L		T
Huron $	7	–	0	–	0	8	–	1	–	0
Southern State (SD)	6	–	1	–	0	8	–	1	–	0
Northern State	4	–	2	–	0	6	–	3	–	0
Black Hills	3	–	3	–	0	4	–	4	–	0
Dakota Wesleyan	4	–	4	–	0	4	–	4	–	0
Yankton	3	–	3	–	0	3	–	4	–	1
General Beadle	1	–	3	–	1	3	–	4	–	1
South Dakota Mines	0	–	6	–	1	0	–	7	–	1
Sioux Falls	0	–	6	–	0	0	–	7	–	0
$ – Conference champion; Northern state forfeited wins over Huron and Southern State.

1957 South Dakota Intercollegiate Conference football standings
	Conf.					Overall
Team	W		L		T	W		L		T
Huron $	7	–	0	–	0	7	–	1	–	0
Northern State	5	–	1	–	0	7	–	1	–	0
General Beadle	4	–	1	–	0	6	–	1	–	1
Southern State (SD)	4	–	2	–	0	5	–	3	–	0
South Dakota Mines	2	–	3	–	1	2	–	4	–	2
Yankton	2	–	5	–	0	2	–	6	–	0
Black Hills	1	–	4	–	1	2	–	6	–	1
Sioux Falls	1	–	4	–	0	1	–	5	–	0
Dakota Wesleyan	1	–	7	–	0	1	–	7	–	0
$ – Conference champion

1958 South Dakota Intercollegiate Conference football standings
	Conf.					Overall
Team	W		L		T	W		L		T
Huron $	7	–	0	–	1	9	–	0	–	1
Northern State	7	–	1	–	0	8	–	2	–	0
Southern State (SD)	6	–	1	–	1	6	–	2	–	1
Yankton	5	–	3	–	0	6	–	3	–	0
Sioux Falls	3	–	4	–	1	3	–	4	–	1
South Dakota Mines	1	–	4	–	3	1	–	4	–	3
General Beadle	2	–	6	–	0	2	–	6	–	0
Dakota Wesleyan	1	–	6	–	1	1	–	7	–	1
Black Hills	0	–	7	–	1	0	–	7	–	1
$ – Conference champion

1959 South Dakota Intercollegiate Conference football standings
	Conf.					Overall
Team	W		L		T	W		L		T
No. 14 Huron +	7	–	1	–	0	9	–	1	–	0
Southern State (SD) +	7	–	1	–	0	7	–	2	–	0
General Beadle	5	–	2	–	1	5	–	2	–	1
Northern State	5	–	3	–	0	5	–	4	–	0
Dakota Wesleyan	3	–	4	–	1	3	–	5	–	1
South Dakota Tech	3	–	4	–	0	3	–	4	–	0
Sioux Falls	2	–	5	–	0	2	–	5	–	0
Black Hills	1	–	6	–	0	1	–	6	–	0
Yankton	0	–	7	–	0	0	–	8	–	0
+ – Conference co-champions; Rankings from NAIA poll

1960 South Dakota Intercollegiate Conference football standings
	Conf.					Overall
Team	W		L		T	W		L		T
Northern State +	5	–	1	–	0	8	–	1	–	0
Huron +	5	–	1	–	0	7	–	2	–	0
South Dakota Tech	4	–	2	–	0	5	–	3	–	0
Dakota Wesleyan	3	–	3	–	0	4	–	5	–	0
Southern State (SD)	3	–	3	–	0	4	–	4	–	0
Black Hills	0	–	5	–	1	1	–	6	–	1
General Beadle	0	–	5	–	1	2	–	6	–	1
+ – Conference co-champions

1961 South Dakota Intercollegiate Conference football standings
	Conf.					Overall
Team	W		L		T	W		L		T
No. 6 Northern State $^	6	–	0	–	0	9	–	1	–	0
Huron	5	–	1	–	0	7	–	2	–	0
Southern State (SD)	4	–	2	–	0	6	–	3	–	0
South Dakota Tech	2	–	4	–	0	3	–	5	–	0
Black Hills	2	–	4	–	0	3	–	5	–	0
Dakota Wesleyan	2	–	4	–	0	2	–	7	–	0
General Beadle	0	–	6	–	0	2	–	7	–	0
$ – Conference champion; ^ – NAIA playoff participant; Rankings from NAIA poll

1962 South Dakota Intercollegiate Conference football standings
	Conf.					Overall
Team	W		L		T	W		L		T
No. 6 Northern State $^	6	–	0	–	0	9	–	1	–	0
Huron	5	–	1	–	0	5	–	4	–	0
General Beadle	3	–	3	–	0	5	–	4	–	0
Southern State (SD)	3	–	3	–	0	4	–	4	–	0
Black Hills	2	–	4	–	0	3	–	5	–	0
South Dakota Tech	2	–	4	–	0	4	–	4	–	0
Dakota Wesleyan	0	–	6	–	0	2	–	7	–	0
$ – Conference champion; ^ – NAIA playoff participant

1963 South Dakota Intercollegiate Conference football standings
	Conf.					Overall
Team	W		L		T	W		L		T
No. 11 Northern State $	6	–	0	–	0	8	–	1	–	0
Huron	5	–	1	–	0	6	–	3	–	0
Black Hills	3	–	2	–	1	4	–	3	–	1
Southern State (SD)	2	–	3	–	1	4	–	4	–	1
General Beadle	2	–	4	–	0	3	–	5	–	0
Dakota Wesleyan	1	–	5	–	0	2	–	7	–	0
South Dakota Tech	1	–	5	–	0	2	–	5	–	1
$ – Conference champion; Rankings from NAIA poll

1964 South Dakota Intercollegiate Conference football standings
	Conf.					Overall
Team	W		L		T	W		L		T
Huron $	6	–	0	–	0	7	–	2	–	0
Northern State	5	–	1	–	0	6	–	3	–	0
Black Hills State	3	–	2	–	1	5	–	2	–	1
Dakota Wesleyan	3	–	3	–	0	5	–	3	–	1
South Dakota Tech	1	–	4	–	1	1	–	5	–	2
Southern State (SD)	1	–	5	–	0	2	–	7	–	0
General Beadle	1	–	5	–	0	1	–	7	–	0
$ – Conference champion

1965 South Dakota Intercollegiate Conference football standings
	Conf.					Overall
Team	W		L		T	W		L		T
Northern State $	5	–	1	–	0	5	–	4	–	0
Dakota Wesleyan	4	–	2	–	0	7	–	2	–	0
General Beadle	4	–	2	–	0	6	–	3	–	0
Black Hills State	3	–	3	–	0	5	–	3	–	0
Huron	3	–	3	–	0	5	–	4	–	0
South Dakota Tech	1	–	5	–	0	3	–	5	–	0
Southern State (SD)	1	–	5	–	0	1	–	7	–	0
$ – Conference champion

1966 South Dakota Intercollegiate Conference football standings
	Conf.					Overall
Team	W		L		T	W		L		T
Northern State $	5	–	0	–	1	6	–	1	–	2
Southern State (SD)	4	–	2	–	0	6	–	3	–	0
Black Hills State	3	–	2	–	1	5	–	2	–	1
General Beadle	3	–	3	–	0	5	–	4	–	0
South Dakota Tech	2	–	4	–	0	4	–	4	–	0
Dakota Wesleyan	1	–	4	–	1	3	–	5	–	1
Huron	1	–	4	–	1	1	–	7	–	1
$ – Conference champion

1967 South Dakota Intercollegiate Conference football standings
	Conf.					Overall
Team	W		L		T	W		L		T
Northern State $	6	–	0	–	0	8	–	1	–	0
Huron	4	–	1	–	1	5	–	3	–	1
Dakota Wesleyan	4	–	2	–	0	4	–	5	–	0
Southern State (SD)	2	–	4	–	0	3	–	6	–	0
General Beadle	2	–	4	–	0	4	–	5	–	0
South Dakota Tech	1	–	4	–	1	3	–	4	–	1
Black Hills State	1	–	5	–	0	2	–	6	–	0
$ – Conference champion

1968 South Dakota Intercollegiate Conference football standings
	Conf.					Overall
Team	W		L		T	W		L		T
No. 5 Northern State $^	6	–	0	–	0	9	–	1	–	0
Black Hills State	4	–	2	–	0	4	–	5	–	0
South Dakota Tech	3	–	2	–	1	3	–	4	–	1
Dakota Wesleyan	3	–	3	–	0	6	–	3	–	0
Huron	2	–	4	–	0	2	–	6	–	1
General Beadle	1	–	4	–	1	2	–	5	–	1
Southern State (SD)	1	–	5	–	0	1	–	8	–	0
$ – Conference champion; ^ – NAIA playoff participant; Rankings from NAIA poll

1969 South Dakota Intercollegiate Conference football standings
	Conf.					Overall
Team	W		L		T	W		L		T
No. 12 Northern State $	6	–	0	–	0	9	–	0	–	0
Black Hills State	5	–	1	–	0	5	–	4	–	0
Dakota Wesleyan	3	–	3	–	0	5	–	4	–	0
Southern State (SD)	3	–	3	–	0	4	–	5	–	0
South Dakota Tech	2	–	4	–	0	3	–	6	–	0
Dakota State	1	–	5	–	0	1	–	7	–	0
Huron	1	–	5	–	0	?	–	?	–	?
$ – Conference champion; Rankings from NAIA poll

=== NAIA Division I (1970–1996) ===
1970 South Dakota Intercollegiate Conference football standings
	Conf.					Overall
Team	W		L		T	W		L		T
Black Hills State +	5	–	1	–	0	8	–	2	–	0
Northern State +	5	–	1	–	0	6	–	4	–	0
South Dakota Tech +	5	–	1	–	0	5	–	4	–	0
Dakota State	3	–	3	–	0	5	–	4	–	0
Dakota Wesleyan	2	–	4	–	0	3	–	6	–	0
Huron	1	–	5	–	0	3	–	6	–	0
Southern State (SD)	0	–	6	–	0	0	–	9	–	0
$ – Conference champion

1971 South Dakota Intercollegiate Conference football standings
	Conf.					Overall
Team	W		L		T	W		L		T
No. 8 Northern State $^	5	–	0	–	0	8	–	1	–	1
No. 12 Dakota State	4	–	2	–	0	9	–	2	–	0
South Dakota Tech	3	–	2	–	1	3	–	4	–	1
South Dakota–Springfield	3	–	3	–	0	4	–	5	–	0
Huron	2	–	2	–	2	3	–	4	–	2
Black Hills State	1	–	3	–	1	2	–	6	–	1
Dakota Wesleyan	0	–	6	–	0	2	–	7	–	0
$ – Conference champion; ^ – NAIA Division I playoff participant; Rankings from NAIA Division I poll for Northern State and NAIA Division II poll for Dakota State

1972 South Dakota Intercollegiate Conference football standings
	Conf.					Overall
Team	W		L		T	W		L		T
Northern State $	6	–	0	–	0	8	–	2	–	0
Huron	4	–	2	–	0	6	–	3	–	0
Dakota State	3	–	3	–	0	4	–	5	–	0
Dakota Wesleyan	3	–	3	–	0	3	–	6	–	0
South Dakota Tech	3	–	3	–	0	3	–	6	–	0
South Dakota–Springfield	2	–	4	–	0	3	–	6	–	0
Black Hills State	0	–	6	–	0	1	–	9	–	0
$ – Conference champion

1973 South Dakota Intercollegiate Conference football standings
	Conf.					Overall
Team	W		L		T	W		L		T
No. 17 Dakota State $	5	–	0	–	0	6	–	3	–	0
South Dakota Tech	3	–	1	–	1	4	–	3	–	2
Black Hills State	3	–	2	–	0	4	–	5	–	1
Huron	2	–	2	–	1	?	–	?	–	?
Dakota Wesleyan	1	–	4	–	0	1	–	8	–	0
South Dakota–Springfield	0	–	5	–	0	?	–	?	–	?
$ – Conference champion; Rankings from NAIA Division II poll

1974 South Dakota Intercollegiate Conference football standings
	Conf.					Overall
Team	W		L		T	W		L		T
No. 16 South Dakota Tech $	4	–	0	–	1	6	–	2	–	1
Black Hills State	3	–	1	–	1	5	–	4	–	1
Dakota State	3	–	2	–	0	6	–	4	–	0
Dakota Wesleyan	3	–	2	–	0	6	–	3	–	0
Huron	1	–	4	–	0	2	–	7	–	0
South Dakota–Springfield	0	–	5	–	0	0	–	9	–	0
$ – Conference champion; Rankings from NAIA Division II poll

1975 South Dakota Intercollegiate Conference football standings
	Conf.					Overall
Team	W		L		T	W		L		T
Dakota State +	4	–	1	–	0	6	–	3	–	1
South Dakota Tech +	4	–	1	–	0	5	–	4	–	0
Huron	3	–	2	–	0	3	–	6	–	0
Black Hills State	2	–	3	–	0	2	–	8	–	0
Dakota Wesleyan	1	–	4	–	0	4	–	5	–	0
South Dakota–Springfield	1	–	4	–	0	1	–	8	–	0
+ – Conference co-champions

1976 South Dakota Intercollegiate Conference football standings
	Conf.					Overall
Team	W		L		T	W		L		T
No. 9 Dakota State +	4	–	1	–	0	8	–	2	–	0
No. 10 Dakota Wesleyan +	4	–	1	–	0	8	–	2	–	0
Black Hills State	3	–	2	–	0	5	–	5	–	0
South Dakota Tech	2	–	3	–	0	4	–	4	–	1
Huron	1	–	3	–	1	4	–	5	–	1
South Dakota–Springfield	0	–	4	–	1	1	–	7	–	1
+ – Conference co-champions; Rankings from NAIA Division II poll

1977 South Dakota Intercollegiate Conference football standings
	Conf.					Overall
Team	W		L		T	W		L		T
No. 6 Dakota State $	5	–	0	–	0	10	–	0	–	0
South Dakota Tech	4	–	1	–	0	6	–	3	–	0
Black Hills State	3	–	2	–	0	7	–	3	–	0
Huron	2	–	3	–	0	3	–	6	–	0
Dakota Wesleyan	1	–	4	–	0	5	–	5	–	0
South Dakota–Springfield	0	–	5	–	0	2	–	7	–	0
$ – Conference champion; Rankings from NAIA Division II poll

1978 South Dakota Intercollegiate Conference football standings
	Conf.					Overall
Team	W		L		T	W		L		T
No. T–20 Dakota State $	6	–	0	–	0	8	–	2	–	0
South Dakota Tech	5	–	1	–	0	7	–	2	–	1
Dakota Wesleyan	3	–	2	–	1	5	–	4	–	1
Black Hills State	3	–	2	–	1	6	–	3	–	1
Huron	2	–	4	–	0	2	–	7	–	0
South Dakota–Springfield	1	–	5	–	0	1	–	7	–	1
Sioux Falls	0	–	6	–	0	1	–	9	–	0
$ – Conference champion; Rankings from NAIA Division II poll

1979 South Dakota Intercollegiate Conference football standings
	Conf.					Overall
Team	W		L		T	W		L		T
Black Hills State $	5	–	0	–	1	6	–	3	–	1
Dakota State	5	–	1	–	0	7	–	3	–	0
South Dakota Tech	4	–	1	–	1	5	–	4	–	1
Sioux Falls	3	–	3	–	0	3	–	7	–	0
South Dakota–Springfield	2	–	4	–	0	2	–	7	–	0
Huron	1	–	5	–	0	2	–	7	–	0
Dakota Wesleyan	0	–	6	–	0	0	–	10	–	0
$ – Conference champion

1980 South Dakota Intercollegiate Conference football standings
	Conf.					Overall
Team	W		L		T	W		L		T
No. 11 South Dakota Tech $	6	–	0	–	0	8	–	1	–	0
Black Hills State	5	–	1	–	0	5	–	4	–	0
Sioux Falls	4	–	2	–	0	5	–	5	–	0
Dakota State	3	–	3	–	0	5	–	4	–	0
Huron	2	–	5	–	0	3	–	7	–	0
South Dakota–Springfield	1	–	5	–	0	2	–	8	–	0
Dakota Wesleyan	0	–	6	–	0	1	–	8	–	0
$ – Conference champion; Rankings from NAIA Division II poll

1981 South Dakota Intercollegiate Conference football standings
	Conf.					Overall
Team	W		L		T	W		L		T
South Dakota Tech +	5	–	1	–	0	7	–	2	–	0
Sioux Falls +	5	–	1	–	0	6	–	3	–	1
South Dakota–Springfield	4	–	2	–	0	6	–	4	–	0
Huron	3	–	3	–	0	6	–	4	–	0
Dakota State	2	–	4	–	0	3	–	7	–	0
Black Hills State	1	–	4	–	1	1	–	7	–	1
Dakota Wesleyan	0	–	5	–	1	0	–	9	–	1
+ – Conference co-champions

1982 South Dakota Intercollegiate Conference football standings
	Conf.					Overall
Team	W		L		T	W		L		T
No. 14 South Dakota Tech $	7	–	0	–	0	7	–	2	–	0
No. 9 Sioux Falls	6	–	1	–	0	9	–	1	–	0
Yankton	5	–	2	–	0	8	–	2	–	0
Dakota State	4	–	3	–	0	5	–	5	–	0
Huron	3	–	4	–	0	5	–	5	–	0
Black Hills State	2	–	5	–	0	2	–	7	–	0
Dakota Wesleyan	1	–	6	–	0	1	–	9	–	0
South Dakota–Springfield	0	–	7	–	0	0	–	10	–	0
$ – Conference champion; Rankings from NAIA Division II poll

1983 South Dakota Intercollegiate Conference football standings
	Conf.					Overall
Team	W		L		T	W		L		T
Black Hills State $	5	–	0	–	2	5	–	2	–	2
Dakota State	5	–	1	–	1	5	–	4	–	1
South Dakota Tech	5	–	2	–	0	5	–	4	–	0
Yankton	4	–	2	–	1	5	–	3	–	2
Sioux Falls	3	–	3	–	1	5	–	4	–	1
Huron	1	–	4	–	2	1	–	7	–	2
Dakota Wesleyan	1	–	6	–	0	1	–	9	–	0
South Dakota–Springfield	0	–	6	–	1	1	–	8	–	1
$ – Conference champion

1984 South Dakota Intercollegiate Conference football standings
	Conf.					Overall
Team	W		L		T	W		L		T
No. 12 Sioux Falls +	5	–	1	–	0	9	–	1	–	0
No. 17 Black Hills State +	5	–	1	–	0	8	–	2	–	0
No. 14 South Dakota Tech +	5	–	1	–	0	7	–	2	–	0
Yankton	2	–	4	–	0	4	–	5	–	0
Dakota State	2	–	4	–	0	2	–	6	–	0
Huron	1	–	5	–	0	2	–	8	–	0
Dakota Wesleyan	1	–	5	–	0	1	–	9	–	0
+ – Conference co-champions; Rankings from NAIA Division II poll

1985 South Dakota Intercollegiate Conference football standings
	Conf.					Overall
Team	W		L		T	W		L		T
South Dakota Tech $	5	–	1	–	0	6	–	3	–	0
Huron	4	–	2	–	0	6	–	3	–	0
Sioux Falls	4	–	2	–	0	6	–	3	–	1
Dakota Wesleyan	3	–	3	–	0	5	–	5	–	0
Black Hills State	2	–	4	–	0	3	–	7	–	0
Dakota State	0	–	6	–	0	0	–	10	–	0
$ – Conference champion

1986 South Dakota Intercollegiate Conference football standings
	Conf.					Overall
Team	W		L		T	W		L		T
No. 7 Huron $^	5	–	0	–	0	9	–	1	–	1
South Dakota Tech	3	–	2	–	0	3	–	6	–	0
Dakota Wesleyan	2	–	3	–	0	4	–	6	–	0
Black Hills State	2	–	3	–	0	3	–	6	–	0
Sioux Falls	2	–	3	–	0	3	–	7	–	0
Dakota State	1	–	4	–	0	1	–	9	–	0
$ – Conference champion; ^ – NAIA Division II playoff participant; Rankings from NAIA Division II poll

1987 South Dakota Intercollegiate Conference football standings
	Conf.					Overall
Team	W		L		T	W		L		T
Dakota Wesleyan +	4	–	1	–	0	6	–	4	–	0
Black Hills State +	4	–	1	–	0	4	–	5	–	0
Huron	3	–	2	–	0	5	–	4	–	0
South Dakota Tech	2	–	3	–	0	3	–	6	–	0
Sioux Falls	2	–	3	–	0	3	–	7	–	0
Dakota State	0	–	5	–	0	0	–	10	–	0
$ – Conference champion

1988 South Dakota Intercollegiate Conference football standings
	Conf.					Overall
Team	W		L		T	W		L		T
No. 8 Sioux Falls $^	5	–	0	–	0	9	–	1	–	1
Huron	3	–	2	–	0	7	–	3	–	0
Black Hills State	3	–	2	–	0	3	–	6	–	0
Dakota Wesleyan	3	–	2	–	0	3	–	7	–	0
South Dakota Tech	1	–	4	–	0	1	–	8	–	0
Dakota State	0	–	5	–	0	1	–	9	–	0
$ – Conference champion; ^ – NAIA Division II playoff participant; Rankings from NAIA Division II poll

1989 South Dakota Intercollegiate Conference football standings
	Conf.					Overall
Team	W		L		T	W		L		T
Sioux Falls +	4	–	1	–	0	7	–	2	–	1
Black Hills State +	4	–	1	–	0	4	–	5	–	0
Dakota Wesleyan +	4	–	1	–	0	5	–	5	–	0
Huron	2	–	3	–	0	4	–	6	–	0
South Dakota Tech	1	–	4	–	0	1	–	8	–	0
Dakota State	0	–	5	–	0	1	–	9	–	0
+ – Conference co-champions

1990 South Dakota Intercollegiate Conference football standings
	Conf.					Overall
Team	W		L		T	W		L		T
Black Hills State $	5	–	0	–	0	5	–	4	–	0
Sioux Falls	3	–	2	–	0	6	–	4	–	0
Dakota Wesleyan	3	–	2	–	0	4	–	6	–	0
Huron	3	–	2	–	0	3	–	7	–	0
Dakota State	1	–	4	–	0	4	–	5	–	0
South Dakota Tech	0	–	5	–	0	0	–	9	–	0
$ – Conference champion

1991 South Dakota Intercollegiate Conference football standings
	Conf.					Overall
Team	W		L		T	W		L		T
Dakota Wesleyan +	4	–	1	–	0	5	–	5	–	0
South Dakota Tech +	4	–	1	–	0	4	–	5	–	0
Dakota State	3	–	2	–	0	8	–	3	–	0
Sioux Falls	2	–	3	–	0	5	–	5	–	0
Black Hills State	2	–	3	–	0	3	–	7	–	0
Huron	0	–	5	–	0	1	–	9	–	0
+ – Conference co-champions

1992 South Dakota Intercollegiate Conference football standings
	Conf.					Overall
Team	W		L		T	W		L		T
No. 7 Dakota Wesleyan $^	5	–	0	–	0	10	–	1	–	0
Black Hills State	4	–	1	–	0	4	–	6	–	0
Sioux Falls	2	–	3	–	0	5	–	5	–	0
Huron	2	–	3	–	0	3	–	6	–	0
Dakota State	1	–	4	–	0	5	–	5	–	0
South Dakota Tech	1	–	4	–	0	2	–	7	–	0
$ – Conference champion; ^ – NAIA Division II playoff participant; Rankings from NAIA Division II poll

1993 South Dakota Intercollegiate Conference football standings
	Conf.					Overall
Team	W		L		T	W		L		T
No. 23 Black Hills State $	5	–	0	–	0	6	–	4	–	0
No. 25 Dakota State	4	–	1	–	0	8	–	2	–	0
Dakota Wesleyan	3	–	2	–	0	7	–	3	–	0
South Dakota Tech	2	–	3	–	0	3	–	6	–	0
Huron	1	–	4	–	0	1	–	7	–	1
Sioux Falls	0	–	5	–	0	2	–	8	–	0
$ – Conference champion; Rankings from NAIA Division II poll

1994 South Dakota Intercollegiate Conference football standings
	Conf.					Overall
Team	W		L		T	W		L		T
No. 12 Sioux Falls +^	4	–	1	–	0	8	–	3	–	0
Dakota Wesleyan +	4	–	1	–	0	6	–	4	–	0
Black Hills State	3	–	2	–	0	6	–	4	–	0
Huron	2	–	3	–	0	3	–	6	–	0
Dakota State	1	–	4	–	0	3	–	7	–	0
South Dakota Tech	1	–	4	–	0	2	–	7	–	0
+ – Conference co-champions; ^ – NAIA Division II playoff participant; Rankings from NAIA Division II poll

1995 South Dakota Intercollegiate Conference football standings
	Conf.					Overall
Team	W		L		T	W		L		T
No. 2 Sioux Falls $^	5	–	0	–	0	11	–	1	–	0
No. 22 Huron	4	–	1	–	0	8	–	2	–	0
South Dakota Tech	3	–	2	–	0	5	–	5	–	0
Black Hills State	1	–	4	–	0	2	–	8	–	0
Dakota Wesleyan	1	–	4	–	0	1	–	9	–	0
Dakota State	1	–	4	–	0	1	–	9	–	0
$ – Conference champion; ^ – NAIA Division II playoff participant; Rankings from NAIA Division II poll

1996 South Dakota-Iowa Intercollegiate Conference football standings
	Conf.			Overall
Team	W		L	W		L
No. 2 Sioux Falls $^	6	–	0	14	–	0
Westmar	5	–	1	7	–	3
Dakota Wesleyan	3	–	3	5	–	5
Black Hills State	3	–	3	4	–	6
Huron	2	–	4	5	–	5
Dakota State	1	–	5	2	–	7
South Dakota Tech	1	–	5	1	–	9
$ – Conference champion; ^ – NAIA Division II playoff participant; Rankings from NAIA Division II poll

=== NAIA (1997–1999) ===
1997 South Dakota-Iowa Intercollegiate Conference football standings
	Conf.			Overall
Team	W		L	W		L
No. 3 Sioux Falls $^	6	–	0	11	–	2
No. 25 Westmar	5	–	1	8	–	2
Dakota Wesleyan	3	–	3	5	–	5
Huron	3	–	3	4	–	6
Black Hills State	2	–	4	3	–	6
Dakota State	1	–	5	2	–	8
South Dakota Tech	1	–	5	1	–	9
$ – Conference champion; ^ – NAIA playoff participant; Rankings from NAIA poll

1998 South Dakota-Iowa Intercollegiate Conference football standings
	Conf.			Overall
Team	W		L	W		L
No. 4 Sioux Falls $^	5	–	0	8	–	3
No. 13 Huron ^	4	–	1	10	–	3
Dakota State	3	–	2	7	–	3
Dakota Wesleyan	2	–	3	4	–	6
Black Hills State	1	–	4	1	–	9
South Dakota Tech	0	–	5	0	–	10
$ – Conference champion; ^ – NAIA playoff participant; Rankings from NAIA poll

1999 South Dakota-Iowa Intercollegiate Conference football standings
	Conf.			Overall
Team	W		L	W		L
No. 21 Sioux Falls $	5	–	0	6	–	3
No. 11 Huron ^	4	–	1	8	–	3
Dakota State	3	–	2	5	–	5
Black Hills State	2	–	3	4	–	6
South Dakota Tech	1	–	4	2	–	8
Dakota Wesleyan	0	–	5	0	–	10
$ – Conference champion; ^ – NAIA playoff participant; Rankings from NAIA Coaches' Poll
