= 2002 NAIA football season =

American college football season

- National Championship: Jim Carroll Stadium; Savannah, TN; December 21, 2002
- Champion: Carroll (MT)
- Player of the Year: Nick Kortan (running back, Sioux Falls)

The 2002 NAIA football season was the component of the 2002 college football season organized by the National Association of Intercollegiate Athletics (NAIA) in the United States. The season's playoffs, known as the NAIA Football National Championship, culminated with the championship game on December 21, at Jim Carroll Stadium in Savannah, Tennessee. The Carroll Fighting Saints defeated the Georgetown Tigers, 28–7, in the title game to win the program's first NAIA championship.

== Conference standings ==
2002 Central States Football League standings
	Conf.			Overall
Team	W		L	W		L
No. 5 NW Oklahoma State $^	4	–	0	11	–	1
Bacone	3	–	1	6	–	5
Langston	2	–	2	2	–	9
Peru State	1	–	3	2	–	8
Haskell	0	–	4	2	–	7
$ – Conference champion; ^ – NAIA playoff participant; Rankings from NAIA Coaches' Poll

2002 Dakota Athletic Conference football standings
	Conf.			Overall
Team	W		L	W		L
No. 10 Dickinson State +^	8	–	1	9	–	2
No. 7 Mary +^	8	–	1	9	–	2
No. 13 Minot State +^	8	–	1	9	–	2
Valley City State	6	–	3	7	–	3
Jamestown	5	–	4	5	–	5
Huron	3	–	6	3	–	7
Mayville State	2	–	7	3	–	7
Black Hills State	2	–	7	2	–	8
South Dakota Mines	2	–	7	2	–	8
Dakota State	1	–	8	1	–	9
+ – Conference co-champions; ^ – NAIA playoff participant; Rankings from NAIA Coaches' Poll

2002 Frontier Conference football standings
	Conf.			Overall
Team	W		L	W		L
No. 1 Carroll (MT) $^	7	–	1	12	–	2
No. 15 Montana Western ^	7	–	1	9	–	3
Montana Tech	3	–	5	4	–	7
Rocky Mountain	2	–	6	2	–	8
Montana State–Northern	1	–	7	1	–	9
$ – Conference champion; ^ – NAIA playoff participant; Rankings from NAIA Coaches' Poll

2002 Great Plains Athletic Conference football standings
	Conf.			Overall
Team	W		L	W		L
No. 3 Sioux Falls $^	8	–	0	12	–	1
No. 17 Doane	6	–	2	7	–	3
No. 24 Hastings	5	–	3	7	–	3
Concordia (NE)	5	–	3	5	–	5
Northwestern (IA)	4	–	4	6	–	4
Nebraska Wesleyan	4	–	4	6	–	4
Midland Lutheran	3	–	5	4	–	7
Dakota Wesleyan	1	–	7	3	–	7
Dana	0	–	8	2	–	9
$ – Conference champion; ^ – NAIA playoff participant; Rankings from NAIA Coaches' Poll

2002 Heart of America Athletic Conference football standings
	Conf.			Overall
Team	W		L	W		L
No. 9 MidAmerica Nazarene $^	9	–	1	9	–	2
No. 12 Benedictine (KS) ^	8	–	2	9	–	3
No. 19 Evangel	8	–	2	8	–	2
No. 20 Missouri Valley	8	–	2	8	–	2
William Jewell	6	–	4	6	–	5
Central Methodist	4	–	6	5	–	6
Avila	4	–	6	4	–	6
Culver–Stockton	4	–	6	4	–	7
Baker	3	–	7	3	–	8
Lindenwood	1	–	9	1	–	10
Graceland	0	–	10	0	–	10
$ – Conference champion; ^ – NAIA playoff participant; Rankings from NAIA Coaches' Poll

2002 Kansas Collegiate Athletic Conference football standings
	Conf.			Overall
Team	W		L	W		L
No. 18 Kansas Wesleyan $^	8	–	1	8	–	2
Bethany (KS)	6	–	3	6	–	3
McPherson	5	–	4	6	–	4
Tabor	5	–	4	6	–	4
Friends	5	–	4	5	–	4
Saint Mary (KS)	5	–	4	5	–	4
Ottawa	5	–	4	5	–	5
Southwestern (KS)	5	–	4	5	–	5
Bethel (KS)	1	–	8	1	–	8
Sterling	0	–	9	0	–	10
$ – Conference champion; ^ – NAIA playoff participant; Rankings from NAIA Coaches' Poll

2002 Mid-South Conference football standings
	Conf.			Overall
Team	W		L	W		L
No. 2 Georgetown (KY) $^	8	–	0	12	–	2
No. 23 Cumberland (TN)	6	–	2	6	–	4
Lambuth	5	–	3	6	–	4
Pikeville	4	–	4	6	–	4
Belhaven	4	–	4	5	–	5
Campbellsville	3	–	5	4	–	6
Cumberland (KY)	3	–	5	4	–	6
Virginia–Wise	2	–	6	3	–	7
Union (KY)	1	–	7	2	–	8
$ – Conference champion; ^ – NAIA playoff participant; Rankings from NAIA Coaches' Poll

2002 Mid-States Football Association standings
	Conf.			Overall
Team	W		L	W		L
Mideast League
No. 8 Saint Francis (IN) x^	6	–	0	11	–	1
No. 21 Tri-State	5	–	1	6	–	3
No. 22 Walsh	4	–	2	8	–	3
Geneva	3	–	3	7	–	5
Malone	2	–	4	4	–	6
Taylor	1	–	5	3	–	7
Urbana	1	–	5	1	–	10
Midwest League
No. 4 McKendree x^	6	–	1	11	–	2
No. 11 Saint Xavier x^	6	–	1	9	–	3
No. 14 St. Ambrose x^	6	–	1	8	–	3
Olivet Nazarene	4	–	3	4	–	6
Trinity International	3	–	4	6	–	5
William Penn	2	–	5	4	–	7
St. Francis (IL)	1	–	6	2	–	8
Iowa Wesleyan	0	–	7	1	–	9
x – League champion/co-champions ^ – NAIA playoff participant; Rankings from NAIA Coaches' Poll

2002 Upper Midwest Athletic Conference football standings
	Conf.			Overall
Team	W		L	W		L
North
Northwestern (MN) x	3	–	0	8	–	2
Martin Luther	2	–	1	6	–	3
Crown	1	–	2	2	–	7
Trinity Bible	0	–	3	0	–	9
South
Maranatha Baptist x	4	–	0	6	–	3
Westminster (MO)	3	–	1	7	–	2
Principia	2	–	2	5	–	4
Rockford	1	–	3	4	–	6
Blackburn	0	–	4	1	–	8
x – Division champion/co-champions

2002 NAIA independents football records
	Conf.			Overall
Team	W		L	W		L
No. 16 Azusa Pacific		–		9	–	1
No. 6 Southern Oregon ^		–		8	–	3
Paul Quinn		–		7	–	4
Edward Waters		–		6	–	4
Morningside		–		5	–	5
Allen		–		0	–	7
^ – NAIA playoff participant; Rankings from NAIA Coaches' Poll
