= 2002 Saint Francis Cougars football team =

American college football season

2002 Saint Francis Cougars football

NAIA Playoff Quarterfinalist MSFA (MEL) champion
- Conference: Mid-States Football Association
- Mideast League
- Record: 11–1 (6–0 MSFA (MEL))
- Head coach: Kevin Donley (5th season)
- Home stadium: Cougar Stadium

2002 Mid-States Football Association standings
	Conf.			Overall
Team	W		L	W		L
Mideast League
No. 8 Saint Francis (IN) x^	6	–	0	11	–	1
No. 21 Tri-State	5	–	1	6	–	3
No. 22 Walsh	4	–	2	8	–	3
Geneva	3	–	3	7	–	5
Malone	2	–	4	4	–	6
Taylor	1	–	5	3	–	7
Urbana	1	–	5	1	–	10
Midwest League
No. 4 McKendree x^	6	–	1	11	–	2
No. 11 Saint Xavier x^	6	–	1	9	–	3
No. 14 St. Ambrose x^	6	–	1	8	–	3
Olivet Nazarene	4	–	3	4	–	6
Trinity International	3	–	4	6	–	5
William Penn	2	–	5	4	–	7
St. Francis (IL)	1	–	6	2	–	8
Iowa Wesleyan	0	–	7	1	–	9
x – League champion/co-champions ^ – NAIA playoff participant; Rankings from NAIA Coaches' Poll

The 2002 Saint Francis Cougars football team represented the University of Saint Francis, located in Fort Wayne, Indiana, in the 2002 NAIA football season. They were led by head coach Kevin Donley, who served his 5th year as the first and only head coach in the history of Saint Francis football. The Cougars played their home games at Cougar Stadium and were members of the Mid-States Football Association (MSFA) Mideast League (MEL). The Cougars finished in 1st place in the MSFA MEL division, and they received an automatic bid to the 2002 postseason NAIA playoffs.

== Schedule ==
(11–1 overall, 6–0 conference)

Date	Opponent	Site	Result
September 14	at Tiffin*	Tiffin, OH	W 41–31
September 21	Iowa Wesleyan*	Cougar Stadium; Fort Wayne, IN	W 45–20
September 28	at William Penn*	Oskaloosa, IA	W 49–14
October 5	at Geneva	Beaver Falls, PA	W 35–28
October 12	Quincy*	Cougar Stadium; Fort Wayne, IN	W 77–21
October 19	Urbana	Cougar Stadium; Fort Wayne, IN	W 70–0
October 26	at Taylor	Upland, IN	W 35–20
November 2	Malone	Cougar Stadium; Fort Wayne, IN	W 33–27
November 9	at Tri-State	Angola, IN	W 48–28
November 16	Walsh	Cougar Stadium; Fort Wayne, IN	W 40–29
November 23	Saint Xavier*	Cougar Stadium; Fort Wayne, IN (NAIA First Round)	W 34–30
November 30	at Georgetown*	Georgetown, KY (NAIA Quarterfinal)	L 0–24
*Non-conference game

== Ranking movements ==
Ranking movements Legend: ██ Increase in ranking ██ Decrease in ranking
	Week												
Poll	Pre	1	2	3	4	5	6	7	8	9	10	11	Final
NAIA Coaches' Poll	19	16	15	12	9	9	7	7	7	6	6	4	8
