= 2013–14 Winthrop Eagles women's basketball team =

Intercollegiate basketball season

2013–14 Winthrop Eagles women's basketball
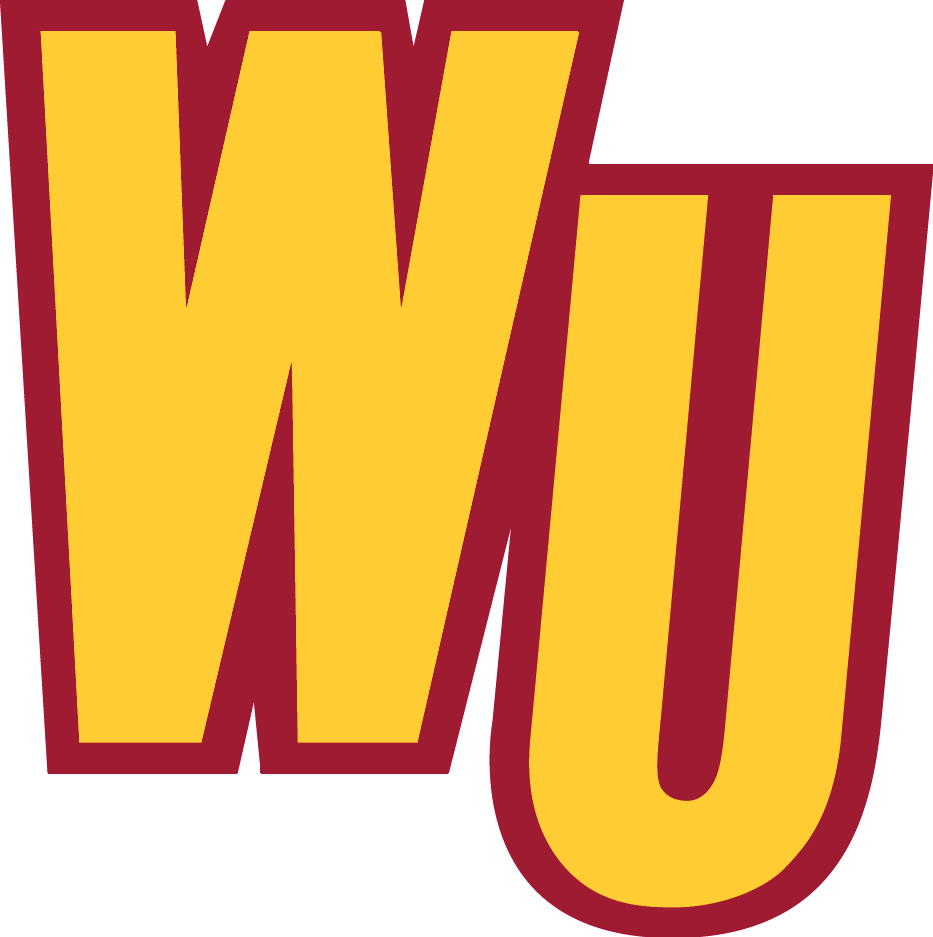
- Conference: Big South Conference
- South Division
- Record: 24–8 (16–4 Big South)
- Head coach: Kevin Cook (2nd season)
- Assistant coaches: Christena Hamilton; Liberty Del Rosario; Matthew Huddelston
- Home arena: Winthrop Coliseum

2013–14 Big South women's basketball standings
	Conf.				Overall
Team	W		L	PCT	W		L	PCT
Liberty	15	–	5	.750	20	–	11	.645
High Point	16	–	4	.800	22	–	11	.667
Winthrop†	15	–	5	.750	24	–	9	.727
Campbell	13	–	7	.650	19	–	12	.613
Gardner-Webb	11	–	9	.550	16	–	14	.533
Coastal Carolina	10	–	10	.500	15	–	16	.484
Presbyterian	9	–	11	.450	12	–	19	.387
UNC Asheville	7	–	13	.350	11	–	20	.355
Radford	5	–	15	.250	7	–	23	.233
Longwood	5	–	15	.250	8	–	22	.267
Charleston Southern	4	–	16	.200	8	–	22	.267
† 2014 Big South tournament winner Rankings from AP poll

The 2013–14 Winthrop Eagles women's basketball team represented Winthrop University during the 2013–14 NCAA Division I women's basketball season. The Eagles, led by second-year head coach Kevin Cook, played their home games at the Winthrop Coliseum and were members of the South Division of the Big South Conference.

== Roster ==
Number	Name	Position	Height	Year	Hometown
1	Aiyah Kilpatrick	Guard	5–8	Sophomore	Matthews, NC
2	Cat Wells	Guard	5–5	Freshman	Toledo, OH
3	Carson Trull	Guard	5–7	Junior	Fort Mill, SC
4	Schaquilla Nunn	Forward/center	6–3	Sophomore	Fayetteville, GA
5	Tiffany Charles	Guard	5–7	Senior	Miami, FL
20	Taylor Calvert	Guard/forward	5–11	Junior	Schertz, TX
21	Brianna Boyd	Forward/center	6–1	Freshman	Ridgeville, SC
22	Dequesha McClanahan	Guard	5–8	Senior	Oak Ridge, TN
23	Ronata Rogers	Forward	6–0	Freshman	Greensboro, NC
24	Samiya Wright	Guard	5–8	RS Junior	Oswego, IL
25	CiiCii Buford	Guard	5–9	Freshman	Baton Rouge, LA
30	Pamela Decheva	Forward	6–1	RS Sophomore	Sofia, Bulgaria
31	Zoe Vernon	Forward/center	6–1	RS Freshman	Chapel Hill, NC
33	Erica Williams	Guard/forward	5–10	Freshman	Rex, GA

== Schedule ==
Date time, TV	Rank^{#}	Opponent^{#}	Result	Record	Site (attendance) city, state
Regular season
11/10/2013*; 2:00 p.m.		Charleston	W 67–49	1–0	Winthrop Coliseum (564); Rock Hill, SC
11/15/2013*; 7:00 p.m.		at Davidson	W 91–76	2–0	John M. Belk Arena (467); Davidson, NC
11/18/2013*; 7:00 p.m.		St. Louis	W 70–61	3–0	Winthrop Coliseum (474); Rock Hill, SC
11/23/2013*; 1:00 p.m.		William & Mary	W 84–71	4–0	Winthrop Coliseum (467); Rock Hill, SC
11/26/2013*; 7:00 p.m.		at Charlotte	L 60–63	4–1	Dale F. Halton Arena (566); Charlotte, NC
11/29/2013*; 4:00 p.m.		vs. UT Martin; RMU Thanksgiving Classic	L 74–79	4–2	Island Sports Center (187); Moon Township, PA
11/30/2013*; 4:00 p.m.		at Robert Morris	W 62–53	5–2	Island Sports Center (203); Moon Township, PA
12/14/2013; 2:00 p.m.		at High Point	W 79–72	6–2 (1–0)	Millis Center (610); High Point, NC
12/20/2013*; 7:00 p.m.		at South Carolina	L 61–69	6–3	Colonial Life Arena (5,021); Columbia, SC
12/28/2013; 1:00 p.m.		Presbyterian	W 55–50	7–3 (2–0)	Winthrop Coliseum (374); Rock Hill, SC
12/30/2013; 2:00 p.m.		Charleston Southern	W 64–49	8–3 (3–0)	Winthrop Coliseum (377); Rock Hill, SC
01/02/2014; 7:00 p.m.		at UNC Asheville	W 68–49	9–3 (4–0)	Kimmel Arena (356); Asheville, NC
01/04/2014; 2:00 p.m.		at Gardner–Webb	L 56–69	9–4 (4–1)	Paul Porter Arena (834); Boiling Springs, NC
01/07/2014*; 7:00 p.m.		North Carolina Central	W 68–46	10–4	Winthrop Coliseum (224); Rockhill, SC
01/09/2014; 7:00 p.m.		at Radford	W 68–56	11–4 (5–1)	Dedmon Center (101); Radford, VA
01/13/2014; 7:00 p.m.		at Coastal Carolina	W 77–53	12–4 (6–1)	HTC Center (552); Conway, SC
01/16/2014; 7:00 p.m.		at Liberty	L 70–77	12–5 (6–2)	Winthrop Coliseum (446); Rockhill, SC
01/18/2014; 1:00 p.m.		Longwood	W 70–49	13–5 (7–2)	Winthrop Coliseum (347); Rockhill, SC
01/23/2014; 7:00 p.m.		at Campbell	L 74–77	13–6 (7–3)	John W. Pope Jr. Convocation Center (412); Buies Creek, NC
01/25/2014; 1:00 p.m.		Coastal Carolina	W 90–61	14–6 (8–3)	Winthrop Coliseum (628); Rockhill, SC
01/30/2014; 7:00 p.m.		at Charleston Southern	W 59–48	15–6 (9–3)	CSU Field House (218); Charleston, SC
02/01/2014; 2:00 p.m.		at Presbyterian	W 51–43	16–6 (10–3)	Templeton Physical Education Center (257); Clinton, SC
02/06/2014; 7:00 p.m.		Gardner–Webb	W 57–52	17–6 (11–3)	Winthrop Coliseum (1,009); Rock Hill, SC
02/08/2014; 1:00 p.m.		at UNC Asheville	W 62–55	18–6 (12–3)	Winthrop Coliseum (569); Rockhill, SC
02/15/2014; 1:00 p.m., ESPN3		Radford	W 57–40	19–6 (13–3)	Winthrop Coliseum (425); Rock Hill, SC
02/20/2014; 7:00 p.m.		at Longwood	W 63–35	20–6 (14–3)	Willett Hall (404); Farmville, VA
02/22/2014; 7:00 p.m., ESPN3		at Liberty	L 69–80	20–7 (14–4)	Vines Center (1,601); Lynchburg, VA
02/27/2014; 7:00 p.m.		High Point	L 71–74	20–8 (14–5)	Winthrop Coliseum (644); Rock Hill, SC
03/01/2014; 1:00 p.m.		Campbell	W 82–56	21–8 (15–5)	Winthrop Coliseum (356); Rock Hill, SC
2014 Big South tournament
03/06/2014; 8:00 p.m., ESPN3	(3)	at (6) Coastal Carolina; Quarterfinals	W 77–58	22–8	HTC Center (1,619); Conway, SC
03/08/2014; 8:00 p.m., ESPN3	(3)	vs. (2) Liberty; Semifinals	W 65–59	23–8	HTC Center (1,753); Conway, SC
03/09/2014; 5:00 p.m., ESPN3	(3)	vs. (1) High Point; Championship	W 87–74	24–8	HTC Center (1,321); Conway, SC
2014 NCAA tournament
03/22/2014*; 11:00 a.m., ESPN2	(L 15)	at (L 2) No. 9 Duke; First round	L 45–87	24–9	Cameron Indoor Stadium (3,013); Durham, NC
*Non-conference game. ^{#}Rankings from AP poll. (#) Tournament seedings in parentheses. All times are in Eastern Time.
