= 2006 NAIA football rankings =

Legend
	Increase in ranking
	Decrease in ranking
	Not ranked previous week
*	NAIA National Champion
т	Tied with team above or below also with this symbol

One human poll made up the 2006 National Association of Intercollegiate Athletics (NAIA) football rankings, sometimes called the NAIA Coaches' Poll or the football ratings. Once the regular season was complete, the NAIA sponsored a 16-team playoff to determine the year's national champion. A final poll was then taken after completion of the 2006 NAIA Football National Championship.

== Poll release dates ==
The poll release dates were:

- August 16, 2006 (Preseason)
- September 11, 2006
- September 18, 2006
- September 25, 2006
- October 2, 2006
- October 9, 2006
- October 16, 2006
- October 23, 2006
- October 30, 2006
- November 6, 2006
- November 12, 2006 (Final)
- January 18, 2007 (Postseason)

== Week by week poll ==
	Week 0-Preseason Aug 16	Week Poll 1 Sep 11	Week Poll 2 Sep 18	Week Poll 3 Sep 25	Week Poll 4 Oct 02	Week Poll 5 Oct 09	Week Poll 6 Oct 16	Week Poll 7 Oct 23	Week Poll 8 Oct 30	Week Poll 9 Nov 06	Week Final Nov 12	Week Postseason Jan 18	
1.	Carroll (MT)	Carroll (MT)	Carroll (MT)	Carroll (MT)	Carroll (MT)	Carroll (MT)	Carroll (MT)	Carroll (MT)	Saint Francis (IN)	Saint Francis (IN)	Saint Francis (IN)	*Sioux Falls (SD)	1.
2.	Saint Francis (IN)	Saint Francis (IN)	Saint Francis (IN)	Saint Francis (IN)	Saint Francis (IN)	Saint Francis (IN)	Saint Francis (IN)	Saint Francis (IN)	Sioux Falls (SD)	Sioux Falls (SD)	Sioux Falls (SD)	Saint Francis (IN)	2.
3.	Sioux Falls (SD)	Sioux Falls (SD)	Sioux Falls (SD)	Sioux Falls (SD)	Sioux Falls (SD)	Sioux Falls (SD)	Sioux Falls (SD)	Sioux Falls (SD)	Walsh (OH)	St. Ambrose (IA)	St. Ambrose (IA)	Missouri Valley	3.
4.	Georgetown (KY)	Georgetown (KY)	Georgetown (KY)	Georgetown (KY)	Georgetown (KY)	Walsh (OH)	Walsh (OH)	Walsh (OH)	St. Ambrose (IA)	Carroll (MT)	Carroll (MT)	Saint Xavier (IL)	4.
5.	McKendree (IL)	Saint Xavier (IL)	Northwestern (IA)	Northwestern (IA)	Northwestern (IA)	Bethel (TN)	St. Ambrose (IA)	St. Ambrose (IA)	(T) Carroll (MT)	Missouri Valley	Missouri Valley	Carroll (MT)	5.
6.	Evangel (MO)	Northwestern (IA)	Walsh (OH)	Walsh (OH)	Walsh (OH)	St. Ambrose (IA)	Missouri Valley	Missouri Valley	(T) Missouri Valley	Northwestern (IA)	Northwestern (IA)	Northwestern (IA)	6.
7.	Dickinson State (SD)	Walsh (OH)	McKendree (IL)	Montana Tech	Saint Xavier (IL)	Missouri Valley	Northwestern (IA)	Northwestern (IA)	Montana State-Northern	Georgetown (KY)	Georgetown (KY)	Bethel (TN)	7.
8.	Saint Xavier (IL)	Azusa Pacific (CA)	Graceland (IA)	St. Ambrose (IA)	St. Ambrose (IA)	Northwestern (IA)	Montana State-Northern	Georgetown (KY)	Northwestern (IA)	Walsh (OH)	Bethel (TN)	Morningside (IA)	8.
9.	Morningside (IA)	Montana Tech	Montana Tech	Saint Xavier (IL)	Bethel (TN)	Montana State-Northern	Georgetown (KY)	Montana State-Northern	Georgetown (KY)	Bethel (TN)	Saint Xavier (IL)	St. Ambrose (IA)	9.
10.	Montana Tech	McKendree (IL)	St. Ambrose (IA)	Bethel (TN)	Missouri Valley	Georgetown (KY)	Kansas Wesleyan	Kansas Wesleyan	Bethel (TN)	Saint Xavier (IL)	Friends (KS)	Georgetown (KY)	10.
11.	Azusa Pacific (CA)	Graceland (IA)	Saint Xavier (IL)	Missouri Valley	Montana State-Northern	Kansas Wesleyan	Saint Xavier (IL)	Bethel (TN)	Saint Xavier (IL)	Friends (KS)	Montana State-Northern	Montana State-Northern	11.
12.	Northwestern (IA)	Bethel (TN)	Bethel (TN)	Kansas Wesleyan	Kansas Wesleyan	Morningside (IA)	Bethel (TN)	Saint Xavier (IL)	Friends (KS)	Black Hills State (SD)	Black Hills State (SD)	Black Hills State (SD)	12.
13.	Walsh (OH)	Cumberlands (KY)	Montana State-Northern	Montana State-Northern	Morningside (IA)	Benedictine (KS)	Friends (KS)	Friends (KS)	Black Hills State (SD)	Montana State-Northern	Morningside (IA)	Friends (KS)	13.
14.	Texas College	St. Ambrose (IA)	Kansas Wesleyan	Morningside (IA)	Montana Tech	Jamestown (ND)	Ohio Dominican	Black Hills State (SD)	Morningside (IA)	Morningside (IA)	Bethel (KS)	Jamestown (ND)	14.
15.	Lindenwood (MO)	Montana State-Northern	(T) Morningside (IA)	Geneva (PA)	Valley City State (ND)	Saint Xavier (IL)	Morningside (IA)	Morningside (IA)	Kansas Wesleyan	Bethel (KS)	Jamestown (ND)	Bethel (KS)	15.
16.	Graceland (IA)	Morningside (IA)	(T) Missouri Valley	Valley City State (ND)	Benedictine (KS)	Bethel (KS)	Black Hills State (SD)	Graceland (IA)	Graceland (IA)	Jamestown (ND)	Walsh (OH)	Walsh (OH)	16.
17.	Bethel (TN)	Geneva (PA)	(T) Geneva (PA)	Graceland (IA)	Jamestown (ND)	McKendree (IL)	Graceland (IA)	Montana Tech	Bethel (KS)	Ohio Dominican	Ohio Dominican	Ohio Dominican	17.
18.	Cumberlands (KY)	Kansas Wesleyan	(T) Jamestown (ND)	Virginia-Wise	Urbana (OH)	Friends (KS)	Montana Tech	Benedictine (KS)	Montana Tech	Benedictine (KS)	Malone (OH)	Benedictine (KS)	18.
19.	St. Ambrose (IA)	Friends (KS)	Azusa Pacific (CA)	Benedictine (KS)	Malone (OH)	Ohio Dominican	Langston (OK)	Jamestown (ND)	Jamestown (ND)	Sterling (KS)	Benedictine (KS)	Malone (OH)	19.
20.	Geneva (PA)	Missouri Valley	Nebraska Wesleyan	Urbana (OH)	Bethel (KS)	Valley City State (ND)	Benedictine (KS)	Bethel (KS)	Ohio Dominican	Kansas Wesleyan	Kansas Wesleyan	Kansas Wesleyan	20.
21.	Tabor (KS)	Jamestown (ND)	Cumberlands (KY)	Jamestown (ND)	McKendree (IL)	Montana Tech	Jamestown (ND)	Ohio Dominican	Virginia-Wise	Graceland (IA)	Northwestern Oklahoma State	Northwestern Oklahoma State	21.
22.	Friends (KS)	Nebraska Wesleyan	Valley City State (ND)	McKendree (IL)	Friends (KS)	Langston (OK)	Bethel (KS)	Cumberlands (KY)	MidAmerica Nazarene (KS)	Malone (OH)	MidAmerica Nazarene (KS)	MidAmerica Nazarene (KS)	22.
23.	Kansas Wesleyan	William Jewell (MO)	MidAmerica Nazarene (KS)	Malone (OH)	Virginia-Wise	Graceland (IA)	Malone (OH)	Nebraska Wesleyan	Langston (OK)	Montana Tech	Nebraska Wesleyan	Nebraska Wesleyan	23.
24.	Valley City State (ND)	Valley City State (ND)	Malone (OH)	Bethel (KS)	Graceland (IA)	Black Hills State (SD)	Nebraska Wesleyan	Virginia-Wise	Benedictine (KS)	Cumberlands (KY)	Virginia-Wise	Virginia-Wise	24.
25.	Minot State (ND)	Tabor (KS)	Tabor (KS)	Friends (KS)	Shorter (GA)	Urbana (OH)	Cumberlands (KY)	Langston (OK)	Sterling (KS)	Northwestern Oklahoma State	Sterling (KS)	Sterling (KS)	25.
	Week 0-Preseason Aug 16	Week Poll 1 Sep 11	Week Poll 2 Sep 18	Week Poll 3 Sep 25	Week Poll 4 Oct 02	Week Poll 5 Oct 09	Week Poll 6 Oct 16	Week Poll 7 Oct 23	Week Poll 8 Oct 30	Week Poll 9 Nov 06	Week Final Nov 12	Week Postseason Jan 18	
		Dropped: Dickinson State(SD); Evangel (MO); Lindenwood (MO); Minot State (ND); Texas College	Dropped: Friends (KS); William Jewell (MO)	Dropped: Azusa Pacific (CA); Cumberlands (KY); MidAmerica Nazarene (KS); Nebraska Wesleyan; Tabor (KS)	Dropped: Geneva (PA)	Dropped: Malone (OH); Shorter (GA); Virginia-Wise	Dropped: McKendree (IL); Urbana (OH); Valley City State (ND)	Dropped: Malone (OH)	Dropped: Cumberlands (KY); Nebraska Wesleyan	Dropped: Langston (OK); MidAmerica Nazarene (KS); Virginia-Wise	Dropped: Cumberlands (KY); Graceland (IA); Montana Tech	None	

== Leading vote-getters ==
Since the inception of the Coaches' Poll in 1999, the #1 ranking in the various weekly polls has been held by only a select group of teams. Through the postseason poll of the 2006 season, the teams and the number of times they have held the #1 weekly ranking are shown below. The number of times a team has been ranked #1 in the postseason poll (the national champion) is shown in parentheses.

In 1999, the results of a postseason poll, if one was conducted, are not known. Therefore, an additional poll has been presumed, and the #1 postseason ranking has been credited to the postseason tournament champion, the Northwestern Oklahoma State Rangers.

Team	Total #1 Rankings
Carroll (MT)	40 (4)
Georgetown (KY)	23 (2)
Sioux Falls (SD)	17 (1)
Northwestern Oklahoma State	12 (1)
Azusa Pacific (CA)	3
Saint Francis (IN)	3
