= 2006 Sioux Falls Cougars football team =

American college football season

2006 Sioux Falls Cougars football

NAIA national champion GPAC champion

NAIA National Championship Game, W 23–19 vs. St. Francis (IN)
- Conference: Great Plains Athletic Conference
- Record: 14–0 (10–0 GPAC)
- Head coach: Kalen DeBoer (2nd season)
- Offensive coordinator: Chuck Morrell (8th season)
- Defensive coordinator: Jon Anderson (5th season)

2006 Great Plains Athletic Conference football standings
	Conf.			Overall
Team	W		L	W		L
No. 1 Sioux Falls $^	10	–	0	14	–	0
No. 6 Northwestern (IA) ^	9	–	1	11	–	2
No. 8 Morningside ^	8	–	2	9	–	3
No. 23 Nebraska Wesleyan	7	–	3	7	–	3
Dana	5	–	5	6	–	5
Briar Cliff	4	–	6	5	–	6
Dakota Wesleyan	4	–	6	4	–	6
Hastings	4	–	6	4	–	6
Concordia (NE)	2	–	8	2	–	8
Midland Lutheran	1	–	9	2	–	9
Doane	1	–	9	1	–	9
$ – Conference champion; ^ – NAIA playoff participant; Rankings from NAIA Coaches' Poll

The 2006 Sioux Falls Cougars football team represented the University of Sioux Falls in the 2006 NAIA football season. The Cougars won the 2006 NAIA Football National Championship with a 23–19 victory over the top-ranked St. Francis Cougars. The team also won the Great Plains Athletic Conference championship with a perfect 10–0 record. This was the school's second NAIA Championship (1996). The team was coached by Kalen DeBoer.

== Schedule ==
Date	Time	Opponent	Rank	Site	Result	Attendance
September 2	11:00 a.m.	Concorida (NE)	No. 3	Howard Wood Field; Sioux Falls, SD	W 49–7	
September 9	1:00 p.m.	at Hastings	No. 3	Hastings, NE	W 32–0	500
September 16	12:00 p.m.	Briar Cliff	No. 3	Howard Wood Field; Sioux Falls, SD	W 41–0	1,653
September 23	1:00 p.m.	at Dana	No. 3	Blair, NE	W 51–17	1,467
September 30	7:30 p.m.	Midland	No. 3	Howard Wood Field; Sioux Falls, SD	W 50–3	3,149
October 7	1:30 p.m.	at No. 5 Northwestern (IA)	No. 3	Orange City, IA	W 17–14	5,251
October 14	7:00 p.m.	No. 12 Morningside	No. 3	Howard Wood Field; Sioux Falls, SD	W 24–0	4,908
October 21	7:00 p.m.	at Doane	No. 3	Crete, NE	W 51–7	500
October 28	12:00 p.m.	No. 23 Nebraska Wesleyan	No. 3	Howard Wood Field; Sioux Falls, SD	W 52–0	1,185
November 4	1:00 p.m.	at Dakota Wesleyan	No. 2	Mitchell, SD	W 41–0	815
November 18	1:00 p.m.	No. 15 Jamestown*	No. 2	Howard Wood Field; Sioux Falls, SD (NAIA First Round)	W 48–10	1,647
November 25	12:00 p.m.	No. 13 Morningside*	No. 2	Howard Wood Field; Sioux Falls, SD (NAIA Quarterfinal)	W 37–7	
December 2	12:00 p.m.	No. 5 Missouri Valley*	No. 2	Howard Wood Field; Sioux Falls, SD (NAIA Semifinal)	W 25–18	3,155
December 16	12:00 p.m.	No. 1 Saint Francis (IN)*	No. 2	Jim Carroll Stadium; Savannah, TN (NAIA Championship)	W 23–19	5,805
*Non-conference game; Rankings from NAIA Poll released prior to the game; All times are in Central time
