= 2002 NAIA football rankings =

Legend
	Increase in ranking
	Decrease in ranking
	Not ranked previous week
*	NAIA National Champion
т	Tied with team above or below also with this symbol

One human poll made up the 2002 National Association of Intercollegiate Athletics (NAIA) football rankings, sometimes called the NAIA Coaches' Poll or the football ratings. Once the regular season was complete, the NAIA sponsored a playoff to determine the year's national champion. A final poll was then taken after completion of the 2002 NAIA Football National Championship.

== Poll release dates ==
The poll release dates were:

- August 20, 2002 (Preseason)
- September 10, 2002 (Week 1)
- September 17, 2002 (Week 2)
- September 24, 2002 (Week 3)
- October 1, 2002 (Week 4)
- October 8, 2002 (Week 5)
- October 15, 2002 (Week 6)
- October 22, 2002 (Week 7)
- October 29, 2002 (Week 8)
- November 5, 2002 (Week 9)
- November 12, 2002 (Week 10)
- November 17, 2002 (Final)
- January 12, 2003 (Postseason)

== Week by week poll ==
	Week 0-Preseason Aug 20	Week Poll 1 Sep 10	Week Poll 2 Sep 17	Week Poll 3 Sep 24	Week Poll 4 Oct 01	Week Poll 5 Oct 08	Week Poll 6 Oct 15	Week Poll 7 Oct 22	Week Poll 8 Oct 29	Week Poll 9 Nov 05	Week Poll 10 Nov 12	Week Final Nov 17	Week Postseason Jan 17	
1.	Georgetown (KY)	Georgetown (KY)	Sioux Falls (SD)	Sioux Falls (SD)	Sioux Falls (SD)	Sioux Falls (SD)	Sioux Falls (SD)	Sioux Falls (SD)	Sioux Falls (SD)	Sioux Falls (SD)	Sioux Falls (SD)	Sioux Falls (SD)	*Carroll (MT)	1.
2.	Sioux Falls (SD)	Sioux Falls (SD)	Southern Oregon	Benedictine (KS)	Northwestern Oklahoma State	Northwestern Oklahoma State	Northwestern Oklahoma State	Northwestern Oklahoma State	Northwestern Oklahoma State	Northwestern Oklahoma State	Northwestern Oklahoma State	Northwestern Oklahoma State	Georgetown (KY)	2.
3.	Carroll (MT)	Carroll (MT)	Evangel (MO)	Northwestern Oklahoma State	Mary (ND)	Mary (ND)	McKendree (IL)	McKendree (IL)	McKendree (IL)	McKendree (IL)	McKendree (IL)	Georgetown (KY)	Sioux Falls (SD)	3.
4.	Southern Oregon	Southern Oregon	Benedictine (KS)	Mary (ND)	McKendree (IL)	McKendree (IL)	Georgetown (KY)	Georgetown (KY)	Georgetown (KY)	Georgetown (KY)	Georgetown (KY)	Saint Francis (IN)	McKendree (IL)	4.
5.	Evangel (MO)	Evangel (MO)	Northwestern Oklahoma State	St. Ambrose (IA)	Georgetown (KY)	Georgetown (KY)	Southern Oregon	Southern Oregon	Southern Oregon	Carroll (MT)	Carroll (MT)	Dickinson State (ND)	Northwestern Oklahoma State	5.
6.	(T) Benedictine (KS)	Benedictine (KS)	Mary (ND)	McKendree (IL)	Walsh (OH)	Walsh (OH)	Carroll (MT)	Carroll (MT)	Carroll (MT)	Saint Francis (IN)	Saint Francis (IN)	Mary (ND)	Southern Oregon	6.
7.	(T) Mary (ND)	Mary (ND)	St. Ambrose (IA)	Georgetown (KY)	Southern Oregon	Southern Oregon	Saint Francis (IN)	Saint Francis (IN)	Saint Francis (IN)	MidAmerica Nazarene (KS)	Mary (ND)	McKendree (IL)	Mary (ND)	7.
8.	Northwestern Oklahoma State	Northwestern Oklahoma State	McKendree (IL)	Walsh (OH)	Carroll (MT)	Carroll (MT)	St. Ambrose (IA)	St. Ambrose (IA)	St. Ambrose (IA)	Mary (ND)	Dickinson State (ND)	MidAmerica Nazarene (KS)	Saint Francis (IN)	8.
9.	St. Ambrose (IA)	St. Ambrose (IA)	Georgetown (KY)	Southern Oregon	Saint Francis (IN)	Saint Francis (IN)	MidAmerica Nazarene (KS)	MidAmerica Nazarene (KS)	MidAmerica Nazarene (KS)	Dickinson State (ND)	Southern Oregon	Southern Oregon	MidAmerica Nazarene (KS)	9.
10.	Tri-State (IN)	Tri-State (IN)	Tri-State (IN)	Carroll (MT)	Valley City State (ND)	Valley City State (ND)	Benedictine (KS)	Benedictine (KS)	Benedictine (KS)	Southern Oregon	MidAmerica Nazarene (KS)	Carroll (MT)	Dickinson State (ND)	10.
11.	Valley City State (ND)	Walsh (OH)	Walsh (OH)	Valley City State (ND)	Evangel (MO)	Evangel (MO)	Minot State (ND)	Hastings (NE)	Dickinson State (ND)	Saint Xavier (IL)	Saint Xavier (IL)	Saint Xavier (IL)	Saint Xavier (IL)	11.
12.	Concordia (NE)	Valley City State (ND)	Carroll (MT)	Saint Francis (IN)	St. Ambrose (IA)	St. Ambrose (IA)	Hastings (NE)	Dickinson State (ND)	Mary (ND)	Benedictine (KS)	Benedictine (KS)	Benedictine (KS)	Benedictine (KS)	12.
13.	Walsh (OH)	McKendree (IL)	Hastings (NE)	Evangel (MO)	Benedictine (KS)	Benedictine (KS)	Mary (ND)	Mary (ND)	Walsh (OH)	Minot State (ND)	Minot State (ND)	Minot State (ND)	Minot State (ND)	13.
14.	McKendree (IL)	Hastings (NE)	Valley City State (ND)	Tri-State (IN)	Campbellsville (KY)	MidAmerica Nazarene (KS)	Azusa Pacific (CA)	Walsh (OH)	Valley City State (ND)	Azusa Pacific (CA)	Azusa Pacific (CA)	St. Ambrose (IA)	St. Ambrose (IA)	14.
15.	Montana Tech	Bethany (KS)	Saint Francis (IN)	Campbellsville (KY)	MidAmerica Nazarene (KS)	Hastings (NE)	Dickinson State (ND)	Valley City State (ND)	(T) Azusa Pacific (CA)	St. Ambrose (IA)	St. Ambrose (IA)	Montana Western	Montana Western	15.
16.	Bethany (KS)	Saint Francis (IN)	Bethany (KS)	MidAmerica Nazarene (KS)	Northwestern (IA)	Azusa Pacific (CA)	Walsh (OH)	Azusa Pacific (CA)	(T) Minot State (ND)	(T) Evangel (MO)	Evangel (MO)	Azusa Pacific (CA)	Azusa Pacific (CA)	16.
17.	Campbellsville (KY)	Kansas Wesleyan	Saint Xavier (IL)	Dickinson State (ND)	Missouri Valley (MO)	Dickinson State (ND)	Saint Xavier (IL)	Evangel (MO)	Evangel (MO)	(T) Tri-State (IN)	Walsh (OH)	Evangel (MO)	Doane (NE)	17.
18.	Hastings (NE)	MidAmerica Nazarene (KS)	MidAmerica Nazarene (KS)	Nebraska Wesleyan	Hastings (NE)	Saint Xavier (IL)	Valley City State (ND)	Minot State (ND)	Saint Xavier (IL)	Walsh (OH)	Montana Western	Kansas Wesleyan	Kansas Wesleyan	18.
19.	Saint Francis (IN)	Saint Xavier (IL)	Campbellsville (KY)	Hastings (NE)	Azusa Pacific (CA)	Minot State (ND)	Nebraska Wesleyan	Bethany (KS)	Tri-State (IN)	Montana Western	Kansas Wesleyan	Doane (NE)	Evangel (MO)	19.
20.	Cumberlands (KY)	(T) Montana Tech	Dickinson State (ND)	Northwestern (IA)	Saint Xavier (IL)	Lambuth (TN)	Evangel (MO)	Tri-State (IN)	Hastings (NE)	Kansas Wesleyan	Missouri Valley (MO)	Missouri Valley (MO)	Missouri Valley (MO)	20.
21.	Kansas Wesleyan	(T) Doane (NE)	Nebraska Wesleyan	(T) Azusa Pacific (CA)	Dickinson State (ND)		Cumberland (TN)	Saint Xavier (IL)	Nebraska Wesleyan	Valley City State (ND)	Doane (NE)	Tri-State (IN)	Tri-State (IN)	21.
22.	MidAmerica Nazarene (KS)	Concordia (NE)	Azusa Pacific (CA)	(T) Missouri Valley (MO)	Minot State (ND)	Missouri Valley (MO)	Montana Western	Doane (NE)	Kansas Wesleyan	Missouri Valley (MO)	Lambuth (TN)	Northwestern (MN)	Walsh (OH)	22.
23.	Northwestern (MN)	Campbellsville (KY)	Northwestern (IA)	(T) Saint Xavier (IL)	Malone (OH)	Nebraska Wesleyan	Bethany (KS)	Northwestern (IA)	Montana Western	Doane (NE)	Tri-State (IN)	Walsh (OH)	Cumberland (TN)	23.
24.	Saint Xavier (IL)	Nebraska Wesleyan	Culver-Stockton (MO)	(T) Culver-Stockton (MO)	Nebraska Wesleyan	Campbellsville (KY)	Tri-State (IN)	Kansas Wesleyan	Missouri Valley (MO)	Bethany (KS)	Northwestern (MN)	Hastings (NE)	Hastings (NE)	24.
25.	Doane (NE)	Dickinson State (ND)	Northwestern (MN)	Minot State (ND)	(T) Cumberland (TN); (T) Northwestern (MN)	Cumberland (TN)	Ottawa (KS)	Montana Western	Northwestern (IA)	Nebraska Wesleyan	Hastings (NE)	Valley City State (ND)	Northwestern (MN)	25.
	Week 0-Preseason Aug 20	Week Poll 1 Sep 10	Week Poll 2 Sep 17	Week Poll 3 Sep 24	Week Poll 4 Oct 01	Week Poll 5 Oct 08	Week Poll 6 Oct 15	Week Poll 7 Oct 22	Week Poll 8 Oct 29	Week Poll 9 Nov 05	Week Poll 10 Nov 12	Week Final Nov 17	Week Postseason Jan 17	
		Dropped: Cumberlands (KY); Northwestern (MN)	Dropped: Kansas Wesleyan; Montana Tech; Doane (NE); Concordia (NE)	Dropped: Bethany (KS); Northwestern (MN)	Dropped: Tri-State (IN); Culver-Stockton (MO)	Dropped: Northwestern (IA); Malone (OH); Northwestern (MN)	Dropped: Lambuth (TN); Missouri Valley (MO); Campbellsville (KY)	Dropped: Nebraska Wesleyan; Cumberland (TN); Ottawa (KS)	Dropped: Bethany (KS); Doane (NE)	Dropped: Hastings (NE); Northwestern (IA)	Dropped: Valley City State (ND); Bethany (KS); Nebraska Wesleyan	Dropped: Lambuth (TN)	Dropped: Valley City State (ND)	

== Leading vote-getters ==
Since the inception of the Coaches' Poll in 1999, the #1 ranking in the various weekly polls has been held by only a select group of teams. Through the postseason poll of the 2002 season, the teams and the number of times they have held the #1 weekly ranking are shown below. The number of times a team has been ranked #1 in the postseason poll (the national champion) is shown in parentheses.

In 1999, the results of a postseason poll, if one was conducted, are not known. Therefore, an additional poll has been presumed, and the #1 postseason ranking has been credited to the postseason tournament champion, the Northwestern Oklahoma State Rangers.

Team	Total #1 Rankings
Georgetown (KY)	23 (2)
Northwestern Oklahoma State	12 (1)
Sioux Falls (SD)	10
Azusa Pacific (CA)	3
Carroll (MT)	1 (1)
