= 1996 NAIA Division II football season =

American college football season

- Regular season: August–November 1996
- Postseason: November–December 1996
- National Championship: Jim Carroll Stadium; Savannah, Tennessee
- Champions: Sioux Falls

The 1996 NAIA Division II football season, as part of the 1996 college football season in the United States and the 41st season of college football sponsored by the NAIA, was the 27th (and final) season of play of the NAIA division II for football.

The season was played from August to November 1996 and culminated in the 1996 NAIA Division II Football National Championship, played at Jim Carroll Stadium in Savannah, Tennessee.

Sioux Falls defeated Western Washington in the championship game, 47–25, to win their first NAIA national title.

== Conference changes ==
=== Conference changes ===
- This is the final season the NAIA officially recognizes a football champion from the Northwest Conference. The NWC, and its six members from Oregon and Washington, would subsequently join the NCAA as a Division III conference.
- The South Dakota Intercollegiate Conference was renamed as the South Dakota-Iowa Intercollegiate Conference after the addition of two football programs from Iowa, Westmar University and Dordt College. This was the first time since the founding of the SDIC in 1917 that it admitted members outside of South Dakota.

=== Membership changes ===
Team	1995 conference	1996 conference
Lewis & Clark	Columbia (Mount Hood)	Northwest
Linfield	Columbia (Mount Hood)	Northwest
Pacific Lutheran	Columbia (Mount Hood)	Northwest
Puget Sound	Columbia (Mount Hood)	Northwest
Willamette	Columbia (Mount Hood)	Northwest
Whitworth	Columbia (Mount Hood)	Northwest

== Conference standings ==
1996 American Southwest Conference football standings
	Conf.			Overall
Team	W		L	W		L
No. 11 Hardin–Simmons +^	3	–	1	8	–	2
Sul Ross +	3	–	1	6	–	4
No. 19 Howard Payne	2	–	2	8	–	2
Austin	1	–	3	3	–	7
McMurry	1	–	3	3	–	7
Mississippi College *	0	–	0	4	–	6
+ – Conference co-champions; ^ – NAIA Division II playoff participant * – Ineligible for conference title; Rankings from NAIA Division II poll

1996 Columbia Football Association standings
	Conf.			Overall
Team	W		L	W		L
No. 6 Western Washington $^	4	–	1	11	–	2
Simon Fraser	3	–	2	6	–	4
Central Washington	3	–	2	5	–	5
Eastern Oregon	2	–	3	6	–	4
Western Oregon	2	–	3	3	–	7
Southern Oregon	1	–	4	4	–	6
$ – Conference champion; ^ – NAIA Division II playoff participant; Rankings from NAIA Division II poll

1996 Heart of America Athletic Conference football standings
	Conf.			Overall
Team	W		L	W		L
No. 5 Evangel $^	9	–	0	10	–	1
No. 15 Benedictine (KS) ^	7	–	2	8	–	3
No. T–24 Graceland	7	–	2	7	–	3
No. 22 Baker	7	–	2	7	–	4
Culver–Stockton	4	–	5	5	–	5
MidAmerica Nazarene	4	–	5	5	–	5
Lindenwood	3	–	6	4	–	6
William Jewell	2	–	7	3	–	7
Central Methodist	1	–	8	2	–	8
Missouri Valley	1	–	8	1	–	9
$ – Conference champion; ^ – NAIA Division II playoff participant; Rankings from NAIA Division II poll

1996 Kansas Collegiate Athletic Conference football standings
	Conf.			Overall
Team	W		L	W		L
No. 8 Bethany (KS) $^	8	–	0	8	–	2
Bethel (KS)	7	–	1	7	–	3
No. 23 Southwestern (KS)	6	–	2	7	–	3
Friends	5	–	3	5	–	5
McPherson	4	–	4	5	–	5
Kansas Wesleyan	3	–	5	3	–	7
Sterling	2	–	6	2	–	8
Ottawa	1	–	7	1	–	8
Tabor	0	–	8	0	–	10
$ – Conference champion; ^ – NAIA Division II playoff participant; Rankings from NAIA Division II poll

1996 Mid-South Conference football standings
	Conf.			Overall
Team	W		L	W		L
No. 3 Lambuth $^	7	–	0	9	–	2
No. 18 Cumberland (TN)	6	–	1	8	–	2
North Greenville	4	–	3	7	–	3
Campbellsville	4	–	3	6	–	4
Georgetown (KY)	3	–	4	4	–	5
Bethel (TN)	2	–	5	3	–	8
Cumberland (KY)	1	–	6	2	–	7
Union (KY)	1	–	6	1	–	9
$ – Conference champion; ^ – NAIA playoff participant Union forfeited three victories including two conference wins, over North Greenville and Bethel.; Rankings from NAIA Division II poll

1996 Mid-States Football Association standings
	Conf.			Overall
Team	W		L	W		L
Mideast League
No. 13 Malone x	5	–	1	8	–	2
No. 9 Westminster (PA) x^	5	–	1	9	–	3
No. 10 Geneva x^	5	–	1	7	–	3
Walsh	3	–	3	6	–	5
Tiffin	2	–	4	2	–	8
Tri-State	1	–	5	4	–	6
Urbana	0	–	6	1	–	9
Midwest League
No. 1 Findlay x^	6	–	0	12	–	1
No. 17 St. Ambrose	5	–	1	9	–	1
Olivet Nazarene	3	–	3	6	–	4
Iowa Wesleyan	3	–	3	5	–	6
Trinity International	3	–	3	3	–	7
Saint Xavier	1	–	5	2	–	8
Taylor	0	–	6	1	–	9
x – League champion/co-champions ^ – NAIA playoff participant; Rankings from NAIA Division II poll

1996 Nebraska-Iowa Athletic Conference football standings
	Conf.			Overall
Team	W		L	W		L
No. 12 Northwestern (IA) $^	5	–	1	10	–	2
Doane	4	–	2	6	–	3
Hastings	4	–	2	6	–	4
Midland	4	–	2	5	–	5
Dana	3	–	3	4	–	5
Nebraska Wesleyan	1	–	5	2	–	8
Concordia (NE)	0	–	6	2	–	7
$ – Conference champion; ^ – NAIA Division II playoff participant; Rankings from NAIA Division II poll

1996 North Dakota College Athletic Conference football standings
	Conf.			Overall
Team	W		L	W		L
No. 16 Valley City State +^	5	–	1	9	–	2
No. 20 Mary +^	5	–	1	7	–	4
Minot State	4	–	2	6	–	3
Minnesota–Crookston	3	–	3	6	–	4
Dickinson State	3	–	3	5	–	4
Jamestown	1	–	5	1	–	8
Mayville State	0	–	6	2	–	8
+ – Conference co-champions; ^ – NAIA Division II playoff participant; Rankings from NAIA Division II poll

1996 Northwest Conference football standings
	Conf.			Overall
Team	W		L	W		L
No. 7 Willamette $^	5	–	0	9	–	2
No. 15 Pacific Lutheran ^	4	–	1	7	–	3
Linfield	3	–	2	5	–	4
Lewis & Clark	2	–	3	4	–	6
Whitworth	1	–	4	1	–	8
Puget Sound	0	–	5	0	–	9
$ – Conference champion; ^ – NAIA Division II playoff participant; Rankings from NAIA Division II poll

1996 South Dakota-Iowa Intercollegiate Conference football standings
	Conf.			Overall
Team	W		L	W		L
No. 2 Sioux Falls $^	6	–	0	14	–	0
Westmar	5	–	1	7	–	3
Dakota Wesleyan	3	–	3	5	–	5
Black Hills State	3	–	3	4	–	6
Huron	2	–	4	5	–	5
Dakota State	1	–	5	2	–	7
South Dakota Tech	1	–	5	1	–	9
$ – Conference champion; ^ – NAIA Division II playoff participant; Rankings from NAIA Division II poll

1996 NAIA Division II independents football records
	Conf.			Overall
Team	W		L	W		L
No. 4 Clinch Valley ^		–		10	–	1
No. 21 Azusa Pacific		–		7	–	3
No. T–24 Peru State		–		7	–	3
McKendree		–		3	–	5
Sue Bennett		–		0	–	11
^ – NAIA Division II playoff participant; Rankings from NAIA Division II poll

== Conference champions ==
Conference	Champion	Record
Columbia	Western Washington	4–1
Heart of America	Evangel	9–0
Kansas	Bethany	8–0
Mid-South	Lambuth	7–0
Mid-States	Mideast Division: Geneva, Malone, and Westminster (PA); Midwest Division: Findlay	5–1; 6–0
Nebraska-Iowa	Northwestern (IA)	5–1
North Dakota	Valley City State; Mary	5–1
Northwest	Willamette	5–0
South Dakota-Iowa	Sioux Falls	6–0

== Postseason ==
1996 Division II NAIA Football Championship
	1st	2nd	3rd	4th	Total
Western Washington	6	7	0	12	25
Sioux Falls (SD)	7	20	14	6	47
- Date: December 21, 1996
- Stadium: Jim Carroll Stadium
- City: Savannah, Tennessee
- MOP (Offense): Kurtis Riggs, Sioux Falls
- MOP (Defense): Travis Dumke, Sioux Falls
- Attendance: 4,000

The 1996 NAIA Division II Football Championship Series concluded on December 21, 1996, with the championship game played at Jim Carroll Stadium in Savannah, Tennessee. The game was won by the Sioux Falls Cougars over the Western Washington Vikings by a score of 47–25.

=== Bracket ===
First Round; Campus sites
Bethany (KS)	35
Willamette	56
Pacific Lutheran	20
Western Washington	21*
Westminster (PA)	27
Clinch Valley	20
Geneva	13
Findlay	38
Valley City State	7
Northwestern (IA)	14
Sioux Falls	56
Mary	19
Hardin–Simmons	23
Evangel	45
Benedictine (KS)	20
Lambuth	34

Quarterfinals; Campus sites
Willamette	12
Western Washington	13
Westminster (PA)	9
Findlay (OH)	28
Sioux Falls	52
Northwestern (IA)	21
Evangel	28
Lambuth	27

Semifinals; Campus sites
Western Washington	28
Findlay	21
Sioux Falls	28
Evangel	21

Championship; Savannah, TN
Western Washington	25
Sioux Falls	47

- * denotes OT.

== See also ==
- 1996 NCAA Division I-A football season
- 1996 NCAA Division I-AA football season
- 1996 NCAA Division II football season
- 1996 NCAA Division III football season
