= 2014 Big South Conference women's basketball tournament =

- Classification: Division I
- Season: 2013–14
- Teams: 11
- Site: HTC Center; Conway, South Carolina

2013–14 Big South women's basketball standings
| | Conf. | | | | Overall |
| Team | W | | L | PCT | W | | L | PCT |
|---|---|---|---|---|---|---|---|---|
| Liberty | 15 | – | 5 | .750 | 20 | – | 11 | .645 |
| High Point | 16 | – | 4 | .800 | 22 | – | 11 | .667 |
| Winthrop† | 15 | – | 5 | .750 | 24 | – | 9 | .727 |
| Campbell | 13 | – | 7 | .650 | 19 | – | 12 | .613 |
| Gardner-Webb | 11 | – | 9 | .550 | 16 | – | 14 | .533 |
| Coastal Carolina | 10 | – | 10 | .500 | 15 | – | 16 | .484 |
| Presbyterian | 9 | – | 11 | .450 | 12 | – | 19 | .387 |
| UNC Asheville | 7 | – | 13 | .350 | 11 | – | 20 | .355 |
| Radford | 5 | – | 15 | .250 | 7 | – | 23 | .233 |
| Longwood | 5 | – | 15 | .250 | 8 | – | 22 | .267 |
| Charleston Southern | 4 | – | 16 | .200 | 8 | – | 22 | .267 |
† 2014 Big South tournament winner Rankings from AP poll

The 2014 Big South women's basketball tournament was the postseason women's basketball tournament for the Big South Conference, taking place March 4–9, 2014, at the HTC Center in Conway, South Carolina. Both semifinal games and the championship were broadcast on ESPN3 with the preliminaries airing online via Big South Network.

== Format ==
All 11 Conference teams were eligible for the tournament. Seeding was determined by their record, with various tiebreakers used to eliminate a tie.

== Seeds ==
2014 Big South Women's Basketball Tournament seeds
| Seed | School | Conf. | Over. | Tiebreaker |
| 1 | High Point ‡ | 16–4 | 20–9 | |
| 2 | Liberty | 15-5 | 20-10 | 2-0 vs. Winthrop |
| 3 | Winthrop | 15–5 | 21–8 | 0-2 vs. Liberty |
| 4 | Campbell | 13–7 | 18–11 | |
| 5 | Gardner–Webb | 11–9 | 16–13 | |
| 6 | Coastal Carolina | 10–10 | 14–15 | |
| 7 | Presbyterian | 9–11 | 11–18 | |
| 8 | UNC Asheville | 7–13 | 10–19 | |
| 9 | Radford | 5–15 | 7–22 | 1-1 vs. Coastal Carolina |
| 10 | Longwood | 5–15 | 8–21 | 0-2 vs. Coastal Carolina |
| 11 | Charleston Southern | 4–16 | 8–21 | |
‡ – Big South regular season champions. Overall records are as of the end of the regular season.

== Schedule ==
| Session | Game | Time* | Matchup^{#} | Television | Attendance |
First round - Tuesday, March 4
| 1 | 1 | 11:00am | #8 UNC Asheville 43, #9 Radford 42 | Big South Network | 2,014 |
| 1 | 2 | 1:00pm | #7 Presbyterian 54, #10 Longwood 40 | Big South Network | 1,335 |
| 2 | 3 | 6:00pm | #6 Coastal Carolina 106, #11 Charleston Southern 71 | Big South Network | 1,216 |
Quarterfinals - Thursday, March 6
| 3 | 4 | 12:00pm | #1 High Point vs. #8 UNC Asheville | Big South Network | |
| 3 | 5 | 2:00pm | #4 Campbell vs. #5 Gardner-Webb | Big South Network | |
| 4 | 6 | 6:00pm | #2 Liberty vs. #7 Presbyterian | Big South Network | |
| 4 | 7 | 8:00pm | #3 Winthrop vs. #6 Coastal Carolina | Big South Network | |
Semifinals - Saturday, March 8
| 5 | 8 | 12:00pm | #1 High Point vs. #4 Campbell | ESPN3 | |
| 5 | 9 | 2:00pm | #2 Liberty vs. #3 Winthrop | ESPN3 | |
Championship Game - Sunday, March 9
| 6 | 10 | 12:00pm | #1 High Point vs. #3 Winthrop | ESPN3 | |

*Game times in Eastern Time. #Rankings denote tournament seeding.

== Bracket ==
First round March 4, 2014
8 | UNC Asheville | 43
9 | Radford | 42
7 | Presbyterian | 54
10 | Longwood | 40
6 | Coastal Carolina | 106
11 | Charleston Southern | 71

Quarterfinals; March 6, 2014
1 | High Point | 79
8 | UNC Asheville | 69
4 | Campbell | 63
5 | Gardner-Webb | 46
2 | Liberty | 67
7 | Presbyterian | 42
3 | Winthrop | 77
6 | Coastal Carolina | 58

Semifinals; March 8, 2014; ESPN3
1 | High Point | 73
4 | Campbell | 69
2 | Liberty | 59
3 | Winthrop | 65

Championship game March 9, 2014; ESPN3
1 | High Point | 74
3 | Winthrop | 87

* Indicates overtime victory

All times listed are Eastern
