= John Hough James =

American lawyer

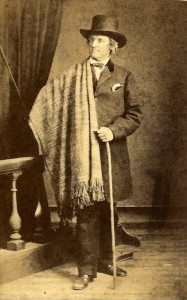
Photo of John Hough James

John Hough James (1800–1881) was an American lawyer, banker, railroad builder, scientific farmer and stockbreeder, legislator, politician, editor, lecturer and writer. James was a pioneer in the development of western banking and transportation.

== Early life ==
James was born in Waterford, Virginia to Levi James and Rachel Hough. Levi was the son of Joseph James, born on board a ship traveling from Wales to America. During his life, Levi was a shopkeeper, a merchant of river commerce, a bank director and a prominent citizen in the developing city of Cincinnati. Rachel Hough was the daughter of John Hough and Lydia Hollingsworth and was descended from the large and prominent family of Samuel Hough in Bucks County, Pennsylvania. John Hough James spent his early childhood in Northern Virginia. When he was thirteen, his family moved to the rugged frontier of southern Ohio, landing at Cincinnati November 4, 1813.

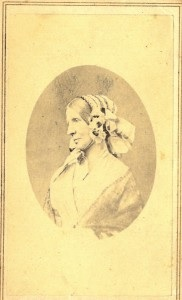
Abigail Bailey James portrait

In Cincinnati, Levi James became a trustee of Lancaster Seminary school which John Hough and his brother David Allen James attended. Levi and other parents of children needing further education helped form Cincinnati College. John was in the first graduating class, eventually earning a master's degree from the school. He married Abigail Bailey, the daughter of Revolutionary War printer Frances Bailey, in 1825 and the couple moved to Urbana, Ohio. They had four children including a son, John Henry James who served as a Union soldier in the Civil War.

== Literary life ==
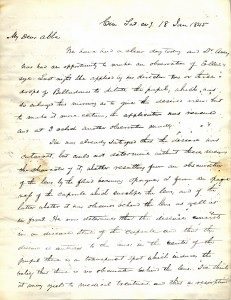
John Hough James letter

James grew to adulthood in the era of railroad expansion and the development of the telegraph. He embraced the sweeping changes that were taking place during his lifetime and he used the accelerating rate of communication and the expanding reach of transportation to strengthen connections between himself and his environment. The primary conduit between James and the world was the process of reading, writing and dialogue. James was already an active letter writer by the time he was a teenager. In school, he was an energetic debater and an admired actor. As a young adult, James circle of correspondents came to include men and women among family, friends and acquaintances. He was central to the formation of a literary group, the "Phoenix Club," which included his future wife, Abigail. He read, wrote and taught language classes at Cincinnati College.

The significance of James' interaction with his classmates, correspondents, club members, family and friends is that he deeply engaged the literature of his age in the development of his relationships, professional life and personal lifestyle. As a reader he absorbed the accumulated knowledge of renowned thinkers. As a discussant he analyzed the information he read, and as an author he expressed his own conclusions and observations, thus contributing to the ongoing literary conversation. Noted historians and educators, David Thelen and Roy Rosenzweig have said their subjects "built narratives that enabled them to shape the courses of their own and others' lives."

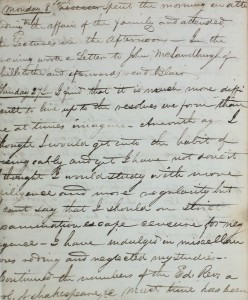
John Hough James diary page

In a similar way, James and the other contributors deliberately wielded composition as a tool and a resource for personal and interpersonal development. This is illustrated in relation to James, himself, by his first diary entry:

1 January 1821 - With the beginning of a New Year- I commence a journal of ephemeral events.- a kind of record of my hours of application and of rest - to look at in after days.- trusting that the contemplation of what I have done may serve to remind me of what I can do and the consideration of what I have not may stimulate me to what I should do.

As a prominent figure, James was asked to speak publicly on many occasions. These presentations involved political issues, national events, local initiatives and business dealings. He began collecting and composing material for a written history of Ohio in the 1830s, but later abandoned the project after much work when he was advised of another such project that would be published before his was ready. In later years, James bought the Urbana Free Press and renamed it the Urbana Union. He had long been a contributor of articles and editorials for many publications including the National Intelligencer. He participated a wide range of educational projects from the support of Cincinnati College to the development of Urbana University. He accumulated a tremendous personal library that he shared with his family, and which became a treasured heirloom for several generations. "The main feature of the James home was, of course, James' library. Over the years he accumulated a wealth of books and a massive array of historical materials. .. no record exists as to either the full extent or content of Mr. James' remarkable collection, except that it literally consumed the entire house."

James' support for Urbana University was the culmination of a lifelong commitment to education for men and women. His wife, Abby James, supervised the planting of trees on the campus and did much of it herself. The course of study at the school was divided into three departments: Language, Science and Philosophy (which included the "Science of Correspondence.") James participated in school administration as well as various educational functions and the James family library was an important reference resource for students at the university. In 1854, the university's first graduating class was composed of three boys and one girl.

== Business life ==
John Hough James was interested in nearly every aspect of business and commerce that he encountered. He read for law and began to practice soon after graduating from college. He also worked for his father's river shipping business in various capacities. In his lifetime he owned a bank, a newspaper and several farming properties. He was treasurer and president of the Mad River and Lake Erie Railroad, helping to build one of the earliest railroads in the country. He experimented with numerous other enterprises including mule breeding, silk production, real estate speculation, railroad and canal building, river shipping and more. Although he seems to have been very financially successful throughout his entire life, James was central to many failed business ventures in banking, canal building and railroading.

== Political life ==
James was a friend of both Henry Clay and William Henry Harrison and met with Whig leaders in the General Assembly of Ohio and in the United States Congress in his work as a lawyer and politician. From early political conversations with William Henry Harrison, John Hough James was a staunch Whig and an outspoken campaigner for his party. He supported Harrison, Henry Clay and a host of other candidates as a matter of principle. He spoke publicly in criticism and in support of particular issues related to presidential and national politics and he served as an Ohio State Senator from 1835 to 1839. He remained a Whig long after there was no Whig party.

== Military service ==
In 1828, James was appointed as quartermaster for a division of the local militia in Urbana, Ohio. He was made Lieutenant-Colonel in 1829 and retained the rank of Colonel until he died. Although he did not serve actively in the Civil War, he helped manage the formation and disposition of units from Ohio and, like many others, he helped provide material support for the Union. John's son, John Henry James, graduated from the Kentucky Military Institute and served in the Twenty-sixth Ohio Volunteer Regiment. He fought in several important actions and recorded his experience of the Battle of Murfreesboro in a brief diary.
