= Kevin Cook (basketball) =

American basketball coach

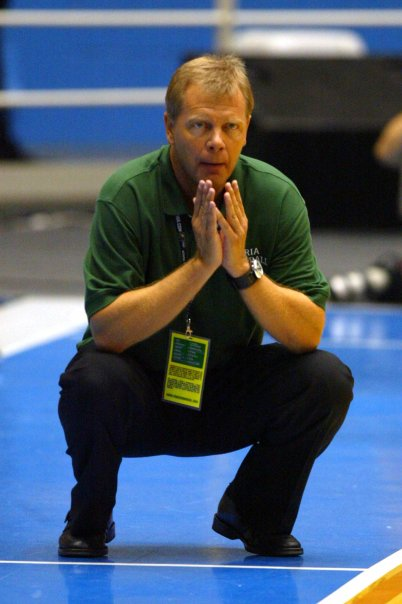
- Cook at 2004 World Championships
- Born: Kevin Cook; February 7, 1961 (age 65); Fremont, Ohio, U.S.
- Education: Urbana University
- Occupations: Basketball Coach, CEO of Triple/Double
- Spouse: Francine D. Cook
- Children: 2

Kevin Lee Cook (born February 7, 1961) is an American basketball coach, and former collegiate athlete, who was most recently the women's basketball head coach at Winthrop University. He also serves as head coach/technical advisor of the Nigerian women's basketball U-19 National team. He served as the Nigerian National team coach from 2006 to 2008. Cook, was also an assistant coach for the WNBA Houston Comets from 1997 to 2007. In a 2011 interview with NCAA.com, Gallaudet All-American Easter Faafiti said of Cook: "He's like my father on the east coast. He has actually taught me a lot of things I never knew or realized about basketball or had even heard of before Coach Cook sat down and explained them to me."

== Personal life ==
Cook was raised in Fremont, Ohio. He excelled in basketball where he was captain of the Fremont Ross High School basketball team. He graduated from Fremont Ross in 1979. He earned his bachelor's degree from Urbana University in 1983. It would be 27 years later until he received his master's degree in Administration from Gallaudet University in the Spring of 2010. Cook is also an author and motivational speaker. Cook is the son of Ruthie Eleanor and Herbert William Cook. He had one sister, Kelly, who died at age 48 in a house fire in Helena, Ohio. Cook met his wife at the Washington DC Cherry Blossom festival on Easter day in 2010. They married on May 26, 2011 at a private ceremony in South Lake Tahoe, CA. He has two daughters from a previous marriage—Keshana Yvette Cook and Kayla Janelle Cook.

In June 2008 Cook was diagnosed with Parkinson's disease.

== Collegiate coaching ==
Cook became Head Coach of Women's Basketball at Gallaudet University on October 27, 2007. His best season at Gallaudet came in 2010-2011. That year Gallaudet won their first twenty games of the season, became nationally ranked, won the NEAC Conference Championship and participated in the NCAA tournament.

Cook was named Head Coach of Garden City Community College on April 11, 1983 and guided the team to two consecutive play-off spots. The 1994-95 team won 20 games and was ranked as high as No. 12 in the National Polls.

== Winthrop University ==
Cook currently coaches the women's basketball team at Winthrop University in Rock Hill, SC. The team in 2013 had a stint in the WNIT before losing to Florida in the second round. Cook coached at Winthrop University as an assistant, before taking the head job in 2012. He has been credited with his fast-paced up and down the floor style of offense.

In 2014 Cook's second year at the helm he led the Lady Eagles of Winthrop University to their first ever Big South Conference Tournament Championship, which is an automatic bid to the NCAA Tournament. The appearance marks the team's first appearance in school history. His two-year record at Winthrop is 45 victories and 21 losses. A winning percentage of 68%.

== International experience ==
Cook served as an advance scout for the USA Women's National team in 2002. That USA team won a gold medal at the World Championships held in China.

In 2006, Cook became Head Coach of the Nigerian National Team and coached Nigeria in their first ever world Championships held in Brazil.

In the summer of 2007, Cook led the Nigerian National Team to an overall record of 14–3 in the all African Games (Silver Medal) and the Nations Cup competition.

In the summer of 2011, Cook served as Head Coach/Technical advisor of the Nigerian U-19 Women's Basketball Team. They participated in the World Championship held in Puerto Monte, Chile July 21–31.

== Assistant coaching ==
Cook served as Assistant Coach under Women's Basketball Hall of Famer, Marian E. Washington at the University of Kansas from 1983 to 1993. He helped the Jayhawks to three Conference Championships; four NCAA appearances; and two WNIT berths. Cook served as Associate Coach at the University of Houston from 1995 to 1997. He then ventured into pro basketball becoming an assistant Coach to Naismith Hall of Fame Coach Van Chancellor. Cook was a part of the WNBA Houston Comets dynasty. The team captured the first four WNBA championships and made the playoffs nine out of the first ten years. Cook also served as assistant coach for the victorious West squad in the WNBA's first three All-Star games.

== Honors and awards ==
- April 5, 2010 Cook named winner of WBCA prestigious Carol Eckman Award.
- October 2010 2010 Urbana University Athletic Hall of Fame.
- March 2011 NEAC Conference Coach of the Year
- March 2011 WBCA Region III Coach of the Year
- May 7, 2011 Urbana University Commencement Speaker
