= Sioux Falls Cougars football =

- First season: 1902; 124 years ago
- Head coach: Jim Glogowski; 3rd season, 18–15 (.545)
- Location: Sioux Falls, South Dakota
- Stadium: Bob Young Field (capacity: 5,000)
- NCAA division: Division II
- Conference: NSIC
- Colors: Purple and white

NAIA national championships
- NAIA: 2006, 2008, 2009 NAIA Division II: 1996

Conference championships
- SDIC: 1981, 1984, 1988, 1989, 1994, 1995, 1996, 1997, 1998, 1999
- Website: usfcougars.com

The Sioux Falls Cougars football team represents the University of Sioux Falls, located in Sioux Falls, South Dakota, in NCAA Division II college football.

The Cougars, who began playing football in 1902, currently compete as members of the Northern Sun Intercollegiate Conference.

Sioux Falls won the NAIA Division II football national championship in 1996 and the NAIA football national championship in 2006, 2008 and 2009. All four of Sioux Falls national championships have been undefeated seasons.

== History ==
Jon Anderson took over as coach in 2017, replacing Jed Stugart. Stugart took over for alum Kalen DeBoer in 2010. DeBoer led USF to a 67–3 record in his five years with 3 national titles as head coach. Legendary coach Bob Young led the Cougars from 1983–2004 guiding them to their first national championship in 1996.

From 2008–2010 the team sported a 42-game winning streak which tied an NAIA record.. In 2012, USF moved to NCAA Division II and joined the Northern Sun Intercollegiate Conference and now has a 69–19 record in the NSIC. Sioux Falls has a 76–26 mark in 102 games at the Division II level. Additionally, the Cougars have made four playoff appearances in the past five years (2015, 2016, 2017 and 2019), missing only in the 7–4 season in 2018. The Cougars won their first-ever NSIC title in 2016 with head coach Jed Stugart leading the Cougars to an 11–0 league mark and 12–1 overall. They had their first-ever playoff win and home playoff win with a 34–21 verdict in the first round of the NCAA Division II playoffs at Bob Young Field, they advanced to the second round in the NCAA Division II playoffs and would lose to end their 2016 season.

=== Conferences ===
- 1892–1920: Independent
- 1917–1939: South Dakota Intercollegiate Conference
- 1940–1947: South Dakota College Conference
- 1948–1959: South Dakota Intercollegiate Conference
- 1960–1976: Tri-State Conference
- 1977–2000: South Dakota Intercollegiate Conference
- 2000–2011: Great Plains Athletic Conference
- 2012–present: Northern Sun Intercollegiate Conference

== Championships ==
=== National championships ===
Year	Association	Division	Head coach	Record	Opponent	Result
1996	NAIA (4)	Division II (1)	Bob Young	14–0	Western Washington	W, 47–25
2006	NAIA (4)	Single (3)	Kalen DeBoer (3)	14–0	Saint Francis (IN)	W, 23–19
2008	NAIA (4)	Single (3)	Kalen DeBoer (3)	14–0	Carroll (MT)	W, 23–7
2009	NAIA (4)	Single (3)	Kalen DeBoer (3)	15–0	Lindenwood	W, 25–22

== Postseason appearances ==
=== NCAA Division II ===
The Cougars have made four appearances in the NCAA Division II playoffs, with a combined record of 1–4.

Year	Round	Opponent	Result
2015	First Round	Henderson State	L, 16–23
2016	First Round; Second Round	Azusa Pacific; Harding	W, 34–21; L, 24–27 ^{OT}
2017	First Round	Midwestern State	L, 20–24
2019	First Round	Colorado Mines	L, 21–24

=== NAIA ===
The Cougars made sixteen appearances in the NAIA playoffs, with a combined record of 36–12 and four national championships.

Year	Round	Opponent	Result
1988	First Round	Northwestern (IA)	L, 9–14
1994	First Round	Minot State	L, 13–20
1995	First Round; Quarterfinals	Hastings; Mary (ND)	W, 41–23; L, 17–42
1996	First Round; Quarterfinals; Semifinals; National Championship	Mary (ND); Northwestern (IA); Evangel; Western Washington	W, 56–19; W, 52–21; W, 28–21; W, 47–25
1997	First Round; Quarterfinals; Semifinals	Ottawa; Jamestown; Willamette	W, 57–14; W, 29–6; L, 7–17
1998	First Round; Quarterfinals	Mary (ND); Olivet Nazarene	W, 29–25; L, 34–37
2001	First Round; Quarterfinals; Semifinals; National Championship	Mary (ND); Concordia Nebraska; Benedictine (KS); Georgetown (KY)	W, 27–21 ^{OT} W, 34–0; W, 40–6; L, 27–49
2002	First Round; Quarterfinals; Semifinals	Kansas Wesleyan; Mary (ND); Carroll (MT)	W, 45–7; W, 13–10; L, 17–20
2003	First Round; Quarterfinals; Semifinals	Benedictine (KS); Northwestern (IA); NW Oklahoma State	W, 24–21; W, 33–7; L, 13–16
2004	First Round; Quarterfinals	Tabor; Azusa Pacific	W, 72–11; L, 3–24
2005	First Round; Quarterfinals; Semifinals	Saint Xavier; Tabor; Carroll (MT)	W, 31–28; W, 48–13; L, 0–55
2006	First Round; Quarterfinals; Semifinals; National Championship	Jamestown; Morningside; Missouri Valley; Saint Francis (IN)	W, 48–10; W, 37–7; W, 25–18; W, 23–19
2007	First Round; Quarterfinals; Semifinals; National Championship	NW Oklahoma State; Saint Xavier; Missouri Valley; Carroll (MT)	W, 35–7; W, 49–7; W, 11–10; L, 9–17
2008	First Round; Quarterfinals; Semifinals; National Championship	Saint Ambrose; Langston; Saint Francis (IN); Carroll (MT)	W, 28–0; W, 50–13; W, 24–6; W, 23–7
2009	First Round; Quarterfinals; Semifinals; National Championship	Minot State; Morningside; Saint Xavier; Lindenwood	W, 63–21; W, 49–21; W, 48–6; W, 25–22
2010	First Round; Quarterfinals; Semifinals; National Championship	NW Oklahoma State; McKendree; MidAmerica Nazarene; Carroll (MT)	W, 33–14; W, 27–7; W, 38–0; L, 7–10

== Notable players ==
The football program has had four NAIA Players of the Year Award winners, running back Nick Kortan in 2002, quarterback Chad Cavender in 2007, quarterback Lorenzo Brown in 2009 and receiver Jon Ryan in 2010. The program has won 19 conference titles, including 10 in the SDIC (1981, 1984, 1988–1989, 1994–1999) and 9 in the GPAC (2001–2004, 2006–2010).

=== NFL draftees ===
Players drafted into the NFL
Year	Round	Pick	Player	Pos.	NFL team
2019	3	91	Trey Pipkins	OT	Los Angeles Chargers
1984	9	237	Brian Hansen	P	New Orleans Saints
