= 2002 NAIA football national championship =

2002 NAIA Football Championship
	1st	2nd	3rd	4th	Total
Carroll (MT)	7	14	0	7	28
Georgetown (KY)	7	0	0	0	7
- Date: December 21, 2002
- Stadium: Jim Carroll Stadium
- City: Savannah, Tennessee
- MOP (Offense): Rob Latrielle, Carroll
- MOP (Defense): Ian Ruth, Georgetown
- Officials: Brian Ernest
- Attendance: 5,878

The 2002 NAIA football championship series concluded on December 21, 2002 with the championship game played at Jim Carroll Stadium in Savannah, Tennessee. The game was won by the Carroll Fighting Saints over the Georgetown Tigers by a score of 28–7.

== Scoring Summary ==
Scoring summary

Quarter	Time	Drive			Team	Scoring information	Score	
Quarter	Time	Plays	Yards	TOP	Team	Scoring information	Carroll Fighting Saints	Georgetown (KY) Tigers
1	5:10	8	52	3:35	Carroll Fighting Saints	Zack Zawacki 6-yard touchdown reception from Rob Latrielle, Rhett Crites kick Good	7	0
1	0:49	8	60	4:08	Georgetown (KY) Tigers	Cody Brown 35-yard touchdown reception from Neil Warren, Jason Coy kick Good	7	7
2	14:18	4	61	1:20	Carroll Fighting Saints	Casey FitzSimmons 13-yard touchdown reception from Rob Latrielle, Rhett Crites kick Good	14	7
2	7:02	10	75	5:10	Carroll Fighting Saints	Mark Gallik 16-yard touchdown reception from Rob Latrielle, Rhett Crites kick Good	21	7
4	4:29	13	76	6:30	Carroll Fighting Saints	Heath Wall 1-yard touchdown run, Rhett Crites kick Good	28	7
"TOP" = time of possession. For other American football terms, see Glossary of American football.							Carroll Fighting Saints	Georgetown (KY) Tigers

== Tournament bracket ==
1st Round; November 23
3	Georgetown (KY)	35
14	Saint Ambrose (IA)	14
4	Saint Francis (IN)	34
11	Saint Xavier (IL)	30
2	NW Oklahoma State	22
12	Benedictine (KS)	7
7	McKendree (IL)	21
8	MidAmerica Nazarene	13
1	Sioux Falls (SD)	45
18	Kansas Wesleyan	7
6	Mary (ND)	21
13	Minot State	18
9	Southern Oregon	30
15	Montana Western	12
5	Dickinson State	23
10	Carroll (MT)	42

Quarterfinals; November 30
3	Georgetown (KY)	24
4	Saint Francis (IN)	0
2	NW Oklahoma State	27
7	McKendree (IL)	32
1	Sioux Falls (SD)	13
6	Mary (ND)	10
9	Southern Oregon	31
10	Carroll (MT)	35

Semifinals; December 7
3	Georgetown (KY)	35
7	McKendree (IL)	19
1	Sioux Falls (SD)	17
10	Carroll (MT)	20

Championship; December 21
3	Georgetown (KY)	7
10	Carroll (MT)	28

- ** denotes Double OT.

== See also ==
- 2002 NAIA football rankings
