= 2006 Saint Francis Cougars football team =

American college football season

2006 Saint Francis Cougars football

NAIA national runner-up MSFA (MEL) champion
- Conference: Mid-States Football Association
- Mideast League
- Record: 13–1 (6–0 MSFA (MEL))
- Head coach: Kevin Donley (9th season)
- Offensive coordinator: Patrick Donley, Trevor Miller (3rd, 1st season)
- Home stadium: Bishop John M. D'Arcy Stadium

2006 Mid-States Football Association standings
	Conf.			Overall
Team	W		L	W		L
Mideast League
No. 2 St. Francis (IN) x^	6	–	0	13	–	1
No. 16 Walsh ^	4	–	2	9	–	3
No. 17 Ohio Dominican	4	–	2	7	–	3
No. 19 Malone	4	–	2	7	–	4
Geneva	2	–	4	4	–	5
Urbana	1	–	5	5	–	6
Taylor	0	–	6	1	–	9
Midwest League
No. 9 St. Ambrose x^	8	–	0	10	–	1
No. 4 Saint Xavier ^	7	–	1	10	–	3
McKendree	5	–	3	5	–	4
William Penn	5	–	3	5	–	6
Quincy	4	–	4	6	–	5
Olivet Nazarene	3	–	5	4	–	7
Trinity International	3	–	5	4	–	7
St. Francis (IL)	1	–	7	1	–	9
Iowa Wesleyan	0	–	8	1	–	9
x – League champion/co-champions ^ – NAIA playoff participant; Rankings from NAIA Coaches' Poll

The 2006 Saint Francis Cougars football team represented the University of Saint Francis, located in Fort Wayne, Indiana, in the 2006 NAIA football season. They were led by head coach Kevin Donley, who served his 9th year as the first and only head coach in the history of Saint Francis football. The Cougars played their home games at Bishop John M. D'Arcy Stadium and were members of the Mid-States Football Association (MSFA) Mideast League (MEL). The Cougars finished in 1st place in the MSFA MEL division, and they received an automatic bid to the 2006 postseason NAIA playoffs.

The 2006 Cougars finished the regular season undefeated. In the postseason playoffs, the Cougars advanced to the national championship game where they lost to the Cougars of Sioux Falls, 23–19.

== Schedule ==
On September 23, 2006, Saint Francis named its football field after Coach Donley in pregame ceremonies. A third consecutive return to the NAIA championship game saw the third consecutive runner-up finish for the Cougars, this time to Sioux Falls (SD).

Date	Time	Opponent	Rank	Site	Result	Attendance
September 9	2:00pm	at William Penn*	No. 2	Statesmen Community Stadium; Oskaloosa, IA	W 39–6	1,250
September 16	Noon	No. 38 Pikeville*	No. 2	Bishop D'Arcy Stadium; Fort Wayne, IN	W 63–0	3,200
September 23	Noon	Wisconsin – River Falls*	No. 2	Bishop D'Arcy Stadium; Fort Wayne, IN	W 63–8	3,500
September 30	Noon	No. 27 Ohio Dominican	No. 2	Bishop D'Arcy Stadium; Fort Wayne, IN	W 21–17	2,500
October 7	Noon	No. 18 Urbana	No. 2	Bishop D'Arcy Stadium; Fort Wayne, IN	W 35–12	2,500
October 14	1:00pm	at Taylor	No. 2	Jim Wheeler Memorial Stadium; Upland, IN	W 49–0	3,500
October 21	Noon	No. 23 Malone	No. 2	Bishop D'Arcy Stadium; Fort Wayne, IN	W 34–13	2,500
October 28	1:00pm	at Seton Hill*	No. 2	Offutt Field; Greensburg, PA	W 55–0	450
November 4	Noon	No. 3 Walsh	No. 1	Bishop D'Arcy Stadium; Fort Wayne, IN	W 21–7	3,000
November 11	1:30pm	at No. 29 Geneva	No. 1	Reeves Field; Beaver Falls, PA	W 21–20	2,271
November 18	Noon	No. 16 Walsh*	No. 1	Bishop D'Arcy Stadium; Fort Wayne, IN (NAIA First Round)	W 42–3	2,300
November 25	Noon	No. 8 Bethel*	No. 1	Bishop D'Arcy Stadium; Fort Wayne, IN (NAIA Quarterfinal)	W 42–35	2,000
December 2	Noon	No. 9 Saint Xavier*	No. 1	Bishop D'Arcy Stadium; Fort Wayne, IN (NAIA Semifinal)	W 49–20	3,000
December 16	1:00pm (FW time)	vs. No. 2 Sioux Falls*	No. 1	Jim Carroll Stadium; Savannah, TN (NAIA Championship)	L 19–23	5,805
*Non-conference game; Rankings from Coaches' Poll released prior to the game; All times are in Eastern time

== National awards and honors ==
- Senior linebacker Brian Kurtz was named as the 2006 NAIA Football Player of the Year. This was the second time in Cougar football history that one of their players received the award.

== Ranking movements ==
Ranking movements Legend: ██ Increase in ranking ██ Decrease in ranking
	Week											
Poll	Pre	1	2	3	4	5	6	7	8	9	10	Final
NAIA Coaches' Poll	2	2	2	2	2	2	2	2	1	1	1	2
