= 2002 Carroll Fighting Saints football team =

American college football season

2002 Carroll Fighting Saints football

NAIA national champion Frontier champion

NAIA National Championship Game, W 28–7 vs. Georgetown (KY)
- Conference: Frontier Conference
- Record: 12–2 (7–1 Frontier)
- Head coach: Mike Van Diest (4th season)
- Home stadium: Nelson Field

2002 Frontier Conference football standings
| | Conf. | | | Overall |
| Team | W | | L | W | | L |
|---|---|---|---|---|---|---|
| No. 1 Carroll (MT) $^ | 7 | – | 1 | 12 | – | 2 |
| No. 15 Montana Western ^ | 7 | – | 1 | 9 | – | 3 |
| Montana Tech | 3 | – | 5 | 4 | – | 7 |
| Rocky Mountain | 2 | – | 6 | 2 | – | 8 |
| Montana State–Northern | 1 | – | 7 | 1 | – | 9 |
$ – Conference champion; ^ – NAIA playoff participant; Rankings from NAIA Coaches' Poll

The 2002 Carroll Fighting Saints football team was an American football team that represented Carroll College as a member of the Frontier Conference during the 2002 NAIA football season. In their fourth season under head coach Mike Van Diest, the Saints compiled a 12–2 record (7–1 against conference opponents) and won the NAIA national championship, defeating Georgetown (Kentucky), 28–7, in the NAIA National Championship Game. It was the first of six national championships between 2002 and 2010.

The team played its home games at Nelson Field at Helena, Montana.

== Schedule ==
| Date | Opponent | Site | Result | Attendance | Source |
|---|---|---|---|---|---|
| September 7 | Rocky Mountain | Nelson Field; Helena, MT | W 20–3 | | |
| September 14 | Central Washington^{†}* | Nelson Field; Helena, MT | L 8–26 | | |
| September 28 | MSU Northern | Tilleman Field; Havre, MT | W 37–0 | | |
| October 5 | Montana Tech | Nelson Field; Helena, MT | W 28–7 | | |
| October 12 | at Rocky Mountain | Community Stadium; Billings, MT | W 31–7 | | |
| October 19 | Montana Western | Bulldog Stadium; Dillon, MT | W 36–21 | | |
| October 26 | at Eastern Oregon* | Community Stadium; La Grande, OR | W 44–13 | | |
| November 2 | MSU Northern | Nelson Field; Helena, MT | W 47–14 | | |
| November 11 | at Montana Tech | Alumni Coliseum; Butte, MT | W 7–2 | | |
| November 16 | Montana Western | Nelson Field; Helena, MT | L 17–35 | | |
| November 23 | at Dickinson State* | Henry Biesiot Activities Center; Dickinson, ND (NAIA first round) | W 42–23 | | |
| November 30 | Southern Oregon* | Nelson Field; Helena, MT (NAIA quarterfinal) | W 35–31 | | |
| December 7 | at Sioux Falls* | Howard Wood Field; Sioux Falls, SD (NAIA semifinal) | W 20–17 | | |
| December 21 | vs. Georgetown (KY)* | Jim Carroll Stadium; Savannah, GA (NAIA Championship Game) | W 28–7 | 5,878 | |
*Non-conference game; ^{†}Homecoming
