= 1996 Sioux Falls Cougars football team =

American college football season

1996 Sioux Falls Cougars football

NAIA Division II champion SDIIC champion

NAIA Division II Championship, W 47–25 vs. Western Washington
- Conference: South Dakota-Iowa Intercollegiate Conference
- Record: 14–0 (6–0 SDIIC)
- Head coach: Bob Young (14th season)
- Defensive coordinator: Scott Underwood (4th season)

1996 South Dakota-Iowa Intercollegiate Conference football standings
	Conf.			Overall
Team	W		L	W		L
No. 2 Sioux Falls $^	6	–	0	14	–	0
Westmar	5	–	1	7	–	3
Dakota Wesleyan	3	–	3	5	–	5
Black Hills State	3	–	3	4	–	6
Huron	2	–	4	5	–	5
Dakota State	1	–	5	2	–	7
South Dakota Tech	1	–	5	1	–	9
$ – Conference champion; ^ – NAIA Division II playoff participant; Rankings from NAIA Division II poll

The 1996 Sioux Falls Cougars football team represented the University of Sioux Falls in the 1996 NAIA Division II football season. Led by head coach Bob Young in his 14th season, the Cougars won their first NAIA Division II Football National Championship with a 47–25 victory over the Western Washington Vikings. The team was also the South Dakota-Iowa Intercollegiate Conference champion.

== Schedule ==
Game	Date	Opponent	Result
1		@ Concordia (NE)	W 56–6
2		@ Jamestown	W 42–12
3		@Midland Lutheran	W 49–29
4		@Huron♦	W 50–14
5		@ Westmar♦	W 20–13
6		Dakota State♦	W 54–7
7		Black Hills State University♦	W 52–7
8		@ South Dakota Tech♦	W 8–6
9		@ Nebraska Wesleyan	W 65–30
10		@ Dakota Wesleyan♦	W 55–16
11	11/23	Mary (NAIA First Round)	W 56–19
12	12/7	Northwestern (NAIA Quarterfinals)	W 52–21
13	12/14	Evangel (NAIA Semifinals)	W 28–22
14	12/21	Western Washington (NAIA Championship)	W 47–25

♦ denotes conference opponent.
