= 2006 NAIA football national championship =

2006 NAIA Football Championship
	1st	2nd	3rd	4th	Total
Sioux Falls (SD)	13	0	10	0	23
Saint Francis (IN)	13	0	0	6	19
- Date: December 16, 2006
- Stadium: Jim Carroll Stadium
- City: Savannah, Tennessee
- MOP (Offense): Chad Cavender, Sioux Falls
- MOP (Defense): Tim Farrell, Saint Francis
- Officials: Randy Swinhart; Mike Malone; John Coles; John Griswold; Chris Flatt; Jason McArthur; Mike Sams
- Attendance: 5,805

The 2006 NAIA football championship series concluded on December 16, 2006, with the championship game played at Jim Carroll Stadium in Savannah, Tennessee. In a battle between two unbeaten USF Cougar teams, the game was won by the Sioux Falls Cougars over the Saint Francis Cougars by a score of 23–19.

== Scoring Summary ==
Scoring summary

Quarter	Time	Drive			Team	Scoring information	Score	
Quarter	Time	Plays	Yards	TOP	Team	Scoring information	Sioux Falls Cougars	Saint Francis Cougars
1	10:30	11	80	4:30	Saint Francis Cougars	Marcus Rush 2-yard touchdown run, Cale Grzych kick Good	0	7
1	8:09	4	66	2:21	Sioux Falls Cougars	Dusty Hovorka 37-yard touchdown reception from Chad Cavender, Matt Lindgren kick Blocked	6	7
1	2:02	11	84	6:02	Saint Francis Cougars	Brian Kurtz 12-yard touchdown reception from Eric Hooks, Cale Grzych kick Failed	6	13
1	1:51	-	-	-	Sioux Falls Cougars	89 Yard Kickoff Return Touchdown by Trey Erickson, Matt Lindgren Kick Good	13	13
3	11:18	9	51	3:42	Sioux Falls Cougars	23-yard field goal by Matt Lindgren	16	13
3	7:25	2	15	0:35	Sioux Falls Cougars	Mike Dvoracek 1-yard touchdown run, Matt Lindgren kick Good	23	13
4	0:00	10	42	1:20	Saint Francis Cougars	Taylor Vieck 1-yard touchdown reception from Jeff Wedding, kick No PAT	23	19
"TOP" = time of possession. For other American football terms, see Glossary of American football.								

== Tournament bracket ==
1st Round; November 18
1	Saint Francis (IN) (11–0)	42
16	Walsh (OH) (9–3)	3
8	Bethel (TN) (10–2)	35
10	Friends (KS) (9–2)	0
4	Carroll (MT) (11–1)	20
11	Montana State Northern (9–3)	7
7	Georgetown (KY) (9–2)	28
9	Saint Xavier (IL) (9–2)	42
2	Sioux Falls (SD) (11–0)	48
15	Jamestown (ND) (8–3)	10
3	Saint Ambrose (IA) (10–1)	31
13	Morningside (IA) (9–2)	38**
5	Missouri Valley (12–0)	31
14	Bethel (KS) (9–2)	14
6	Northwestern (IA) (11–1)	17
12	Black Hills State (SD) (8–3)	10

Quarterfinals; November 25
1	Saint Francis (IN)	42
8	Bethel (TN)	35
4	Carroll (MT)	7
9	Saint Xavier (IL)	14
2	Sioux Falls (SD)	37
13	Morningside (IA)	7
5	Missouri Valley	33
6	Northwestern (IA)	26

Semifinals; December 2
1	Saint Francis (IN)	49
9	Saint Xavier (IL)	20
2	Sioux Falls (SD)	25
5	Missouri Valley	18

Championship; December 16
1	Saint Francis (IN)	19
2	Sioux Falls (SD)	23

- ** denotes double OT.
