= Urbana University =

Private university in Urbana, Ohio, US (1850–2020)

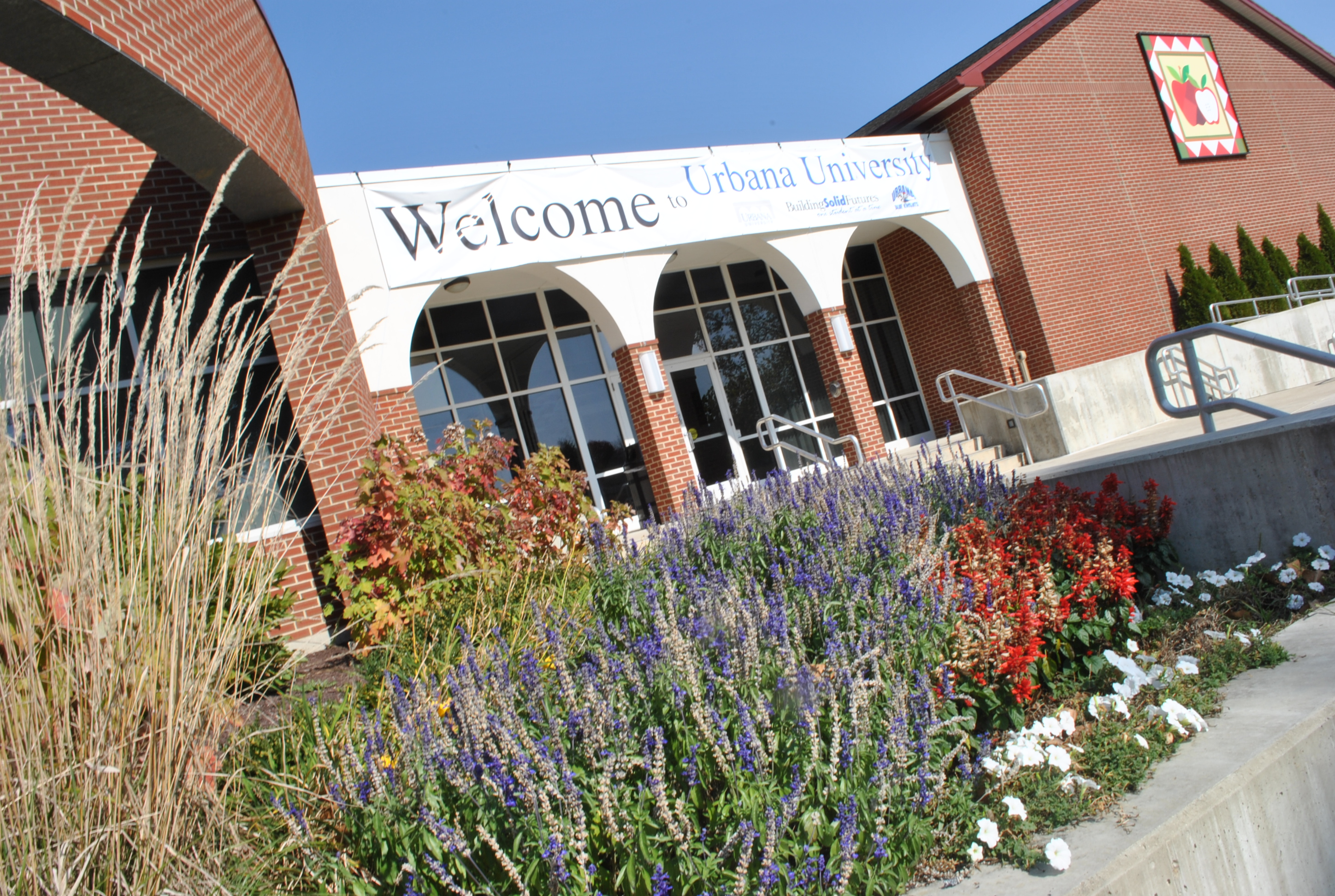
- Urbana University Student Center
- Type: Private
- Active: 1850–2020
- Location: Urbana, Ohio, U.S. 40°06′02″N 83°45′36″W
- Campus: 128 acres (0.52 km^{2})
- Colors: Blue and white
- Nickname: Blue Knights
- Sporting affiliations: Division II; MEC
- Mascot: Knitro the Blue Knight
- Website: www.urbana.edu

Urbana University was a private university specializing in liberal arts education and located in Urbana, Ohio, United States. In its final few years, it was purchased by Franklin University and was a branch campus of that university.

== History ==
Urbana University was founded in 1850 as Urbana College by followers of the 18th-century Swedish philosopher and scientist, Emanuel Swedenborg. The university was the second institution of higher learning in Ohio to admit women; the first was Oberlin College.

The groundwork for the founding of the university was in part laid by John Chapman, better known as Johnny Appleseed, who became the inspiration for the Johnny Appleseed Museum founded for his extraordinary history. While more famous for spreading apple seeds throughout the East, Chapman was also a Swedenborgian missionary and helped spread this faith among the early settlers around Urbana. Chapman encouraged his friend and fellow Swedenborgian, John Hough James, to donate the land on which Urbana University was built. To this day, the university maintains an informal relationship with the Swedenborgian General Convention of the Church of the New Jerusalem in the United States of America. The university is also home to the Johnny Appleseed Educational Center & Museum to honor John Chapman.

Classes for elementary and secondary students under the name Urbana Seminary began in the fall of 1850 in a rented room in a building in downtown Urbana. College level classes were first held in the fall of 1854, following the construction of Bailey Hall, the first building on the campus. Less than 10 years after the college opened it suspended operations from 1861 to 1866 during the Civil War. The college experienced a number of changes in the early 20th century when the college's curriculum was shortened to a two-year junior college format in 1907. The school later shut down the primary school in 1911; and the secondary school was closed in 1928.

Urbana operated as a two-year college until 1968, when it returned curriculum to a four-year format. In 1975, Urbana was granted full membership in the North Central Association of Colleges and Secondary Schools. In 1975, the institution changed its name from Urbana College to Urbana University. Until 2014, in addition to having been a traditional liberal arts college, Urbana University's School of Adult and Graduate Education offered associate degree and Bachelor of Science degree completion programs in Business Management, Education, Criminal Justice Leadership, Human Services Leadership, and many more. In addition to these programs, Master's programs were available in Business Administration, Education, Nursing, and Criminal Justice. Classes met on the Urbana University main campus, and at several off-campus locations throughout Western Ohio. These locations were in Bellefontaine, Dayton, Kettering, Marysville, Piqua, and Springfield.

In 2014, the university was purchased by Franklin University after undergoing significant budget shortfalls. Under the agreement, Urbana would retain its name, and act as a physical campus for both Urbana and Franklin students. On August 1, 2017, Franklin University received approval for its change of status application by the Higher Learning Commission (HLC) to bring Urbana University under Franklin's accreditation as a "branch campus." The campus closed in 2020, transferring records to Franklin University in Columbus, Ohio. Urbana cited the coronavirus pandemic and declining enrollment.

== Campus ==
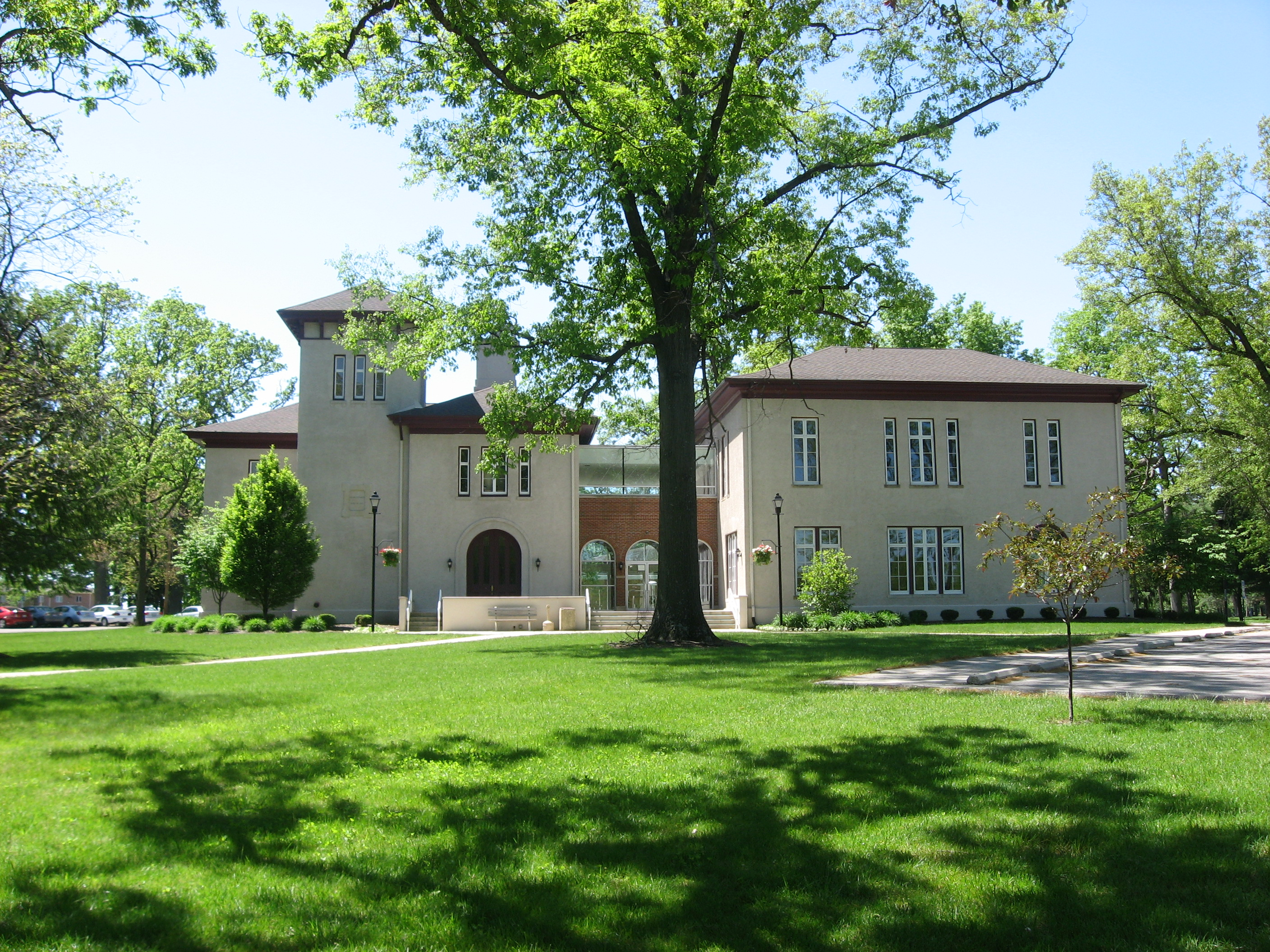
Bailey and Barclay Halls are two of the oldest buildings on the Urbana University campus.

The 128-acre (51.8 ha) main campus was located on the southwest side of Urbana in west central Ohio. Its buildings ranged from historic 19th-century buildings styled in traditional architecture to modern structures. Bailey Hall, Oak Hall, and Barclay Hall are the three oldest buildings on the campus. All three are listed on the National Register of Historic Places. The university had undergone various changes in the early 21st century with the construction of Sycamore Hall in 2004, the Urbana University Stadium, the Student Center in 2006, McConnell Hall in 2007, and Ross Hall in 2019.

== Academics ==
Urbana University offered 28 undergraduate majors and Graduate programs in Nursing (MSN), Education (MEd), Business Administration (MBA), Criminal Justice Administration (MA), and a Post-Baccalaureate in Teacher Licensure

== Athletics ==
The Urbana athletic teams were called the Blue Knights. Their athletic colors were blue and white. The university was a member of the NCAA Division II ranks, primarily competing in the Mountain East Conference (MEC) from 2013–14 to 2019–20. The Blue Knights previously competed in the Great Midwest Athletic Conference (G-MAC) as a provisional member only during the 2012–13 school year; as an NCAA D-II Independent from 2008–09 to 2011–12; and in the defunct American Mideast Conference (AMC) of the National Association of Intercollegiate Athletics (NAIA) from 1971–72 to 2007–08.

Urbana competed in 19 intercollegiate varsity teams. Men's sports included baseball, basketball, cross country, football, golf, soccer, swimming, volleyball and wrestling; women's sports included acrobatics & tumbling, basketball, cross country, golf, lacrosse, soccer, softball, swimming, volleyball and water polo. Urbana University also offered club sport programs in shooting sports, bowling, and cheerleading.

In 2010, Urbana completed the transition from the NAIA to the NCAA in the Division II ranks. Also in that year, the Great Lakes Valley Conference (GLVC) had accepted Urbana as an associate member of the GLVC in football only starting with the 2012 fall season. In 2011, the university and five other schools, many also transitioning to the NCAA from the NAIA, had announced their intentions to form the G-MAC in 2013. The G-MAC ultimately launched a year earlier than planned, in 2012, with Urbana as a member. The school spent only one season in the G-MAC; on August 20, 2012, Urbana was unveiled as a charter member of the MEC, a new Division II conference set to launch for the 2013–14 school year. The MEC is mostly made up of schools leaving the then-soon-to-be dissolved West Virginia Intercollegiate Athletic Conference (WVIAC), but also includes another Ohio school in Notre Dame College.

== Student life ==
=== Student organizations ===
Urbana University had several recognized student organizations including leadership groups such as Student Government Association, Campus Activities Board, and Student Athlete Advisory Committee. There were organizations with special interest topics around politics, disc golf, and cancer awareness; and there were academic groups for history students and students interested in social sciences.

=== Residence life ===
There were six residence halls on campus (South, East, Francis E. Hazard, McConnell, Sycamore, and Ross halls). Urbana's residence halls emphasized civic responsibility, mutual respect, mature interpersonal relationships, multicultural understanding, and community engagement. Students living on campus forged friendships to last a lifetime while learning about different cultures, backgrounds and ideas, gaining an understanding of being part of a community, and developing their leadership skills. Residential living provides students with life skills that were transferable to careers and other aspects of independent living after graduation. Advice and guidance are available from trained upperclass student resident assistants and professional resident hall directors, as well as an Area Coordinator. Resident assistants lived on each floor of each residence hall and served as a resource for students dealing with any type of issue. The university's Student Conduct programs were recognized as Ohio's most innovative Student Affairs program in 2014 by the Ohio College Personnel Association.

== Notable alumni ==
- T. Coleman du Pont, former president of DuPont industries and former U.S. Senator from Delaware
- Justin Edwards, football player; professional mixed martial artist for the UFC's Lightweight Division
- Graham Fach, professional ten-pin bowler, the first Canadian player to win a title on the PBA Tour
- Filip Filipović, former NFL player
- Jan Finney, softball player; professional MMA fighter
- Ross McGregor, member of Ohio House of Representatives
- Gretchen Worden, known for her contributions to the Mütter Museum and several appearances on the Late Show with David Letterman
