= Kalen DeBoer =

American football player and coach (born 1974)

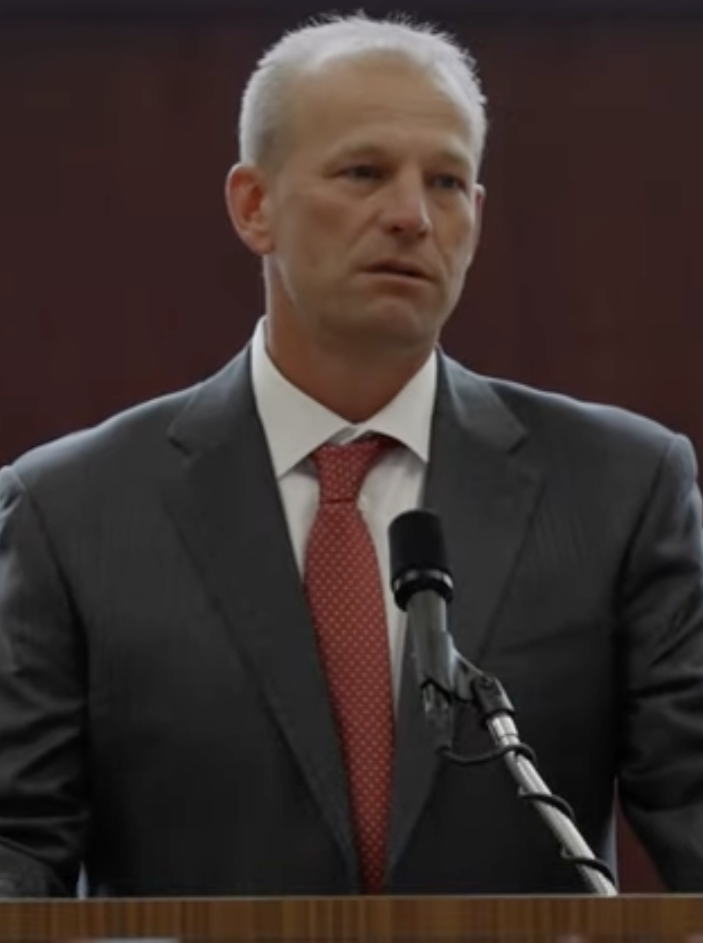
- DeBoer in 2024

Current position
- Title: Head coach
- Team: Alabama
- Conference: SEC
- Record: 29–10
- Annual salary: $12.5 million

Biographical details
- Born: October 24, 1974 (age 52); Milbank, South Dakota, U.S.

Playing career

Football
- 1992: Western Washington
- 1993–1996: Sioux Falls
- 1999: Sioux Falls Falcons
- 2000–2001: Sioux Falls Cobras / Storm

Baseball
- 1993–1996: Sioux Falls
- 1998: Canton Crocodiles
- 1999: Renner Monarchs
- Positions: Wide receiver (football); Left fielder (baseball)

Coaching career (HC unless noted)

Football
- 1997: Sioux Falls (WR)
- 1998–1999: Washington HS (SD) (assistant)
- 2000–2004: Sioux Falls (OC)
- 2005–2009: Sioux Falls
- 2010–2013: Southern Illinois (OC/WR)
- 2014–2016: Eastern Michigan (OC/QB)
- 2017–2018: Fresno State (OC/QB)
- 2019: Indiana (OC/QB)
- 2020–2021: Fresno State
- 2022–2023: Washington
- 2024–present: Alabama

Baseball
- 2000–2004: Sioux Falls (assistant)

Head coaching record
- Overall: 133–22
- Bowls: 3–3
- Tournaments: 2–2 (CFP); 17–2 (NAIA playoffs)

Accomplishments and honors

Championships
- 3 NAIA (2006, 2008–2009); 4 GPAC (2006–2009); 1 Pac-12 (2023)

Awards
- NAIA All-American (1996); 3× AFCA NAIA Coach of the Year (2006, 2008–2009); 3× NAIA Coach of the Year (2006, 2008–2009); 2× Pac-12 Coach of the Year (2022–2023); AFCA Coach of the Year Award (2023); 2× AP Pac-12 Coach of the Year (2022–2023); AP Coach of the Year (2023); Eddie Robinson Coach of the Year (2023); Home Depot Coach of the Year (2023); Sporting News Coach of the Year (2023); Walter Camp Coach of the Year (2023)

Kalen Douglas DeBoer (born October 24, 1974) is an American college football coach. He is the head football coach at the University of Alabama, a position he has held since 2024. DeBoer also served as the head football coach at the University of Sioux Falls from 2005 to 2009, California State University, Fresno from 2020 to 2021, and the University of Washington from 2022 to 2023. At Sioux Falls, his teams won three NAIA Football National Championships, in 2006, 2008, and 2009. At Washington, he led the 2023 Washington Huskies football team to a Pac-12 Conference title and an appearance in the College Football Playoff, where Washington defeated Texas in the 2024 Sugar Bowl before losing to Michigan in the 2024 College Football Playoff National Championship.

== Early life and playing career ==
Born and raised in Milbank, South Dakota, DeBoer graduated from Milbank High School. After a redshirt year at Western Washington University, attended the University of Sioux Falls, DeBoer played at wide receiver from 1993 to 1996 for the Sioux Falls Cougars under head coach Bob Young, setting school records for receptions (234), receiving yardage (3,400) and touchdown catches (33) and earned All-American honors. DeBoer was a student assistant at Sioux Falls in 1997 after his football playing career ended working with the wide receivers, and he graduated in 1998 with a bachelor's degree in secondary education.

Following DeBoer's graduation he signed with the semipro Sioux Falls Falcons alongside his former quarterback at Sioux Falls, Kurtiss Riggs. After one season, he signed with the Sioux Falls Cobras of the Indoor Football League (IFL). In his first game with the Cobras he caught two touchdown passes. The team finished his first season with an 8–6 record. In 2001, the team rebranded to the Sioux Falls Storm and moved to the National Indoor Football League (NIFL). In his last season with the team he helped lead them to a 7–7 record and an appearance in the NIFL semifinal.

DeBoer also played baseball at Sioux Falls, hitting .520 with 10 home runs and 34 RBIs in his senior season of 1997. In 1998, he played one season of independent league baseball with the Canton Crocodiles as a left fielder. He also played one season for the Renner Monarchs.

== Coaching career ==
=== Early coaching career ===
After graduating from the University of Sioux Falls, DeBoer remained in the city of Sioux Falls, South Dakota as an assistant coach at Washington High School. After two years at Washington, DeBoer reunited with Bob Young and returned to his alma mater as offensive coordinator, a position he held from 2000 to 2004. During his tenure as an assistant football coach, he also served as an assistant baseball coach.

Following Young's retirement, Sioux Falls promoted DeBoer to head coach on December 1, 2004. As head coach from 2005 to 2009, DeBoer had a record of 67–3 and won three NAIA national championships in 2006, 2008, and 2009 and a runner-up appearance in 2007. Two of DeBoer's losses at Sioux Falls came at the hands of Mike Van Diest's national title-winning Carroll Fighting Saints squads in 2005 and 2007.

DeBoer was the offensive coordinator at Southern Illinois from 2010 to 2013 under Dale Lennon. He held the same position at Eastern Michigan University from 2014 to 2016 under Chris Creighton, at Fresno State from 2017 to 2018 under Jeff Tedford, and most recently at Indiana under Tom Allen in 2019. The Hoosiers averaged 433.2 yards per game under DeBoer, ranking third in the Big Ten for the season.

=== Fresno State ===
In 2020, DeBoer was hired as the head football coach at Fresno State. In the COVID-19 pandemic shortened season, he led the Bulldogs to a 3–3 record. In the 2021 season, he led Fresno State to a 9–3 regular season record. The season was highlighted with ranked victories over UCLA and San Diego State. The Bulldogs qualified for the New Mexico Bowl, where they defeated UTEP 31–24.

=== Washington ===
On November 29, 2021, DeBoer was hired as the head football coach at the University of Washington.

==== 2022 ====
In his first season with Washington, DeBoer led the team to a 10–2 regular season record. The season was highlighted with victories over ranked teams Michigan State, Oregon State, and Oregon. DeBoer was named Pac-12 Coach of the Year for the 2022 season. The Huskies finished the season with a 27–20 win over Texas in the Alamo Bowl, finishing 11–2.

==== 2023 ====
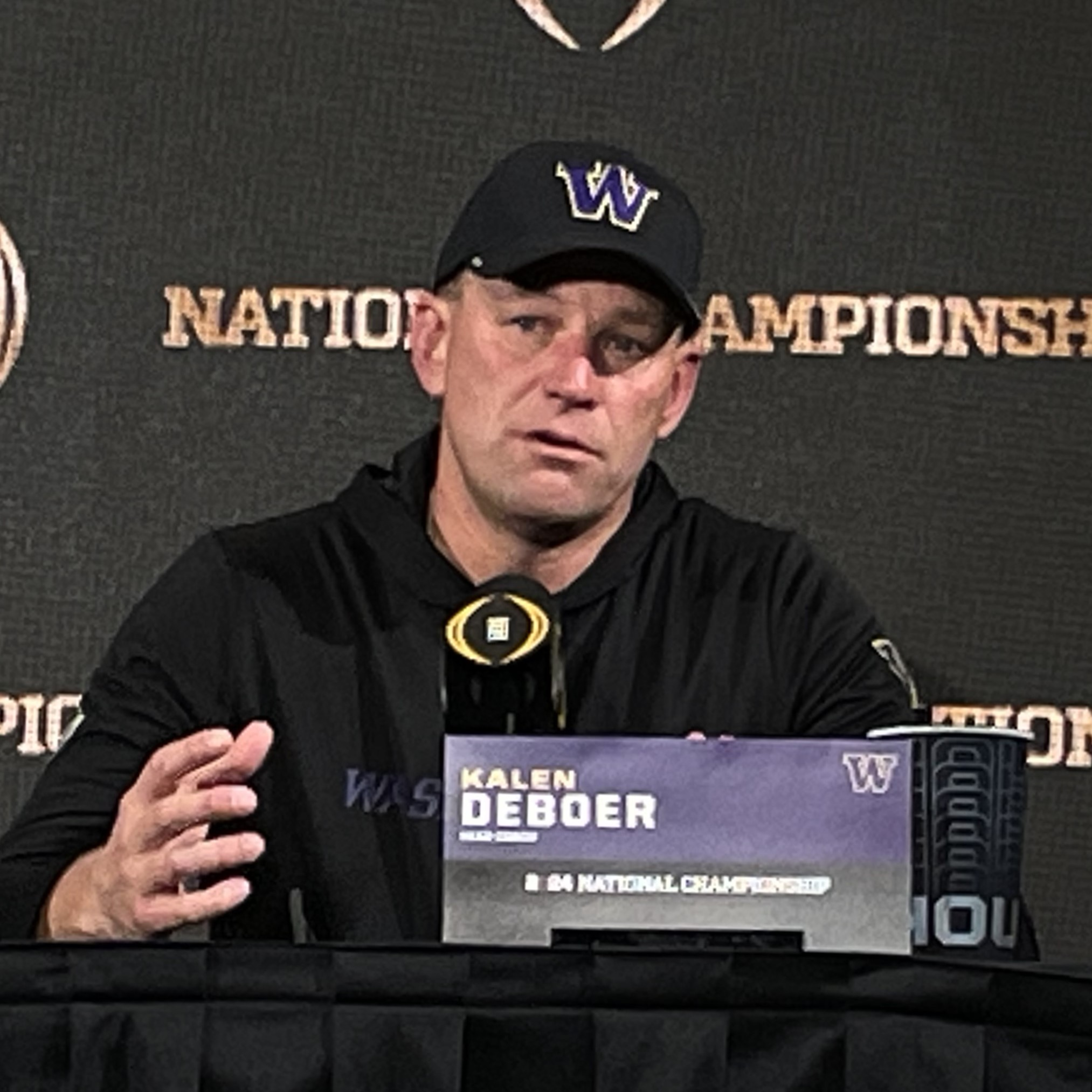
DeBoer addresses the media at the post-game press conference following the 2024 CFP National Championship game.

In his second season, Washington finished the regular season 12–0. Washington then defeated Oregon 34–31 in the Pac-12 Championship. DeBoer was named Pac-12 Coach of the Year for the second consecutive season. DeBoer earned numerous accolades for the 2023 season, including Eddie Robinson Coach of the Year, Home Depot Coach of the Year, Sporting News College Football Coach of the Year, Walter Camp Coach of the Year, and AP Coach of the Year. DeBoer and the Huskies qualified for the 2023 College Football Playoff as the #2 seed. DeBoer helped lead Washington to a 37–31 victory over Texas in the Sugar Bowl. In the CFP National Championship, DeBoer suffered his only loss of the season to Michigan, 34–13. The Huskies finished the season 14–1.

=== Alabama ===
==== 2024 ====
On January 12, 2024, after the retirement of Nick Saban, DeBoer accepted an offer to become the next head coach at the University of Alabama. In his first season as Alabama head coach, the Tide started the season ranked fifth in the preseason AP and Coaches Poll. In the season opener, DeBoer picked up his first win as Alabama's head coach against Western Kentucky 63–0. The following week Alabama struggled against South Florida, but pulled away in the 4th quarter winning 42–16. The next week, Alabama traveled to Madison, Wisconsin for the first time since 1928, defeating Wisconsin 42–10. Following their first bye week, Alabama defeated #2 Georgia 41–34, ending Georgia's 42-game regular-season win streak. The next day, Alabama moved to #1 in the AP Poll, marking the 16th year in the last 17 seasons the Tide have reached the top spot. The next week, DeBoer suffered his first loss as Alabama coach losing to Vanderbilt 40–35. The loss snapped a 23 game win streak versus the Commodores, and was the Tide's first loss to Vanderbilt since 1984. The following week, the Tide overcame a late rally by South Carolina to win 27–25. In the Third Saturday in October, Alabama fell on the road to #11 Tennessee 24–17. On homecoming, the Tide bounced back with a 34–0 shutout of #21 Missouri. Following their second bye week, Alabama traveled to Baton Rouge, Louisiana dominating #15 LSU 42–13. The next week the Tide defeated FCS Mercer 52–7. The following week Alabama traveled to Norman, OK losing to Oklahoma 24–3. It’s the first time since 2010 the Tide have lost three regular season games. In the Iron Bowl, Alabama bounced back with a win over Auburn 28–14, earning the Tide their fifth straight win in the rivalry. DeBoer finished the regular season with a 9–3 record. On December 8, Alabama was selected to play in the ReliaQuest Bowl against Michigan in a rematch of the prior season's Rose Bowl. The Tide lost 19–13, ending a 16 year streak for Alabama winning 10 or more games in a season. The Tide finished the season at 9–4.

==== 2025 ====
Alabama started the 2025 season ranked eighth in the first AP Poll. The Crimson Tide dropped their first game of the season, a road game against Florida State, 31–17. Alabama reeled off an eight-game winning streak which saw four consecutive wins against ranked opponents: Georgia, Vanderbilt, Missouri, and Tennessee. The win over Tennessee marked the time in SEC history that a team won four consecutive games against ranked teams with no bye week in the stretch. Alabama lost to Oklahoma on November 15 by a score of 23–21 to end the streak. Following wins over Eastern Illinois and Auburn, Alabama played Georgia once again in the SEC Championship, losing 28–7. Alabama was chosen for the College Football Playoff. In the First Round, they defeated Oklahoma in a rematch 34–24. In the quarterfinals at the Rose Bowl, Alabama lost to Indiana 38–3.

==== 2026 ====
On April 22, 2026, DeBoer and Alabama agreed to a seven-year, $87.5 million contract extension.

== Personal life ==
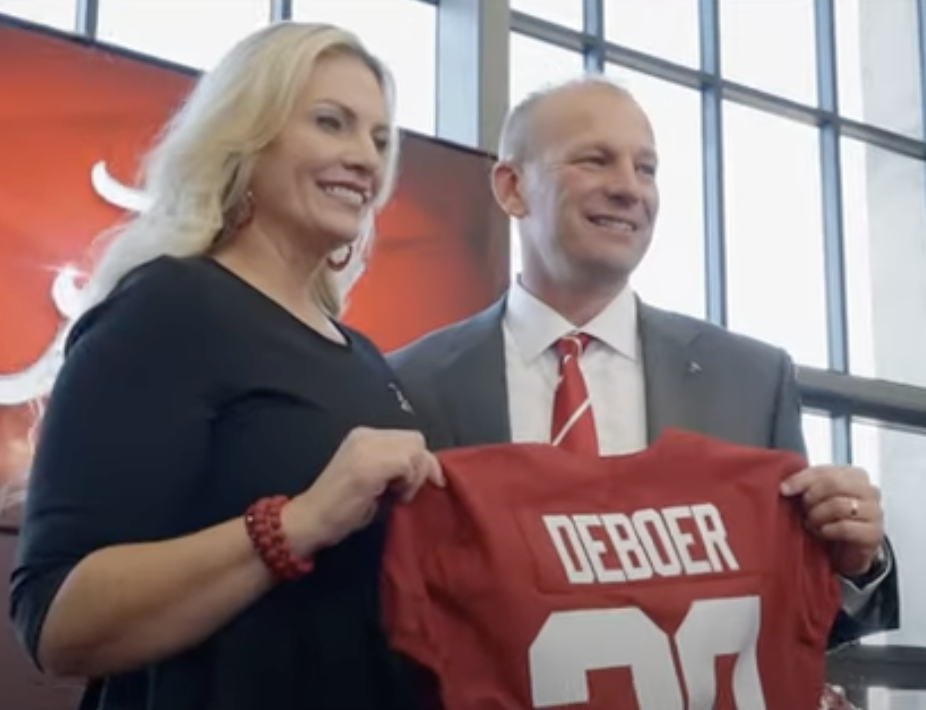
DeBoer with his wife during his introductory press conference at Alabama.

DeBoer is married to his wife Nicole. They have two daughters. Their daughter Alexis plays softball at Washington.

== Head coaching record ==
Year	Team	Overall	Conference	Standing	Bowl/playoffs	Coaches^{#}	AP^{°}
Sioux Falls Cougars (Great Plains Athletic Conference) (2005–2009)
2005	Sioux Falls	11–2	9–1	2nd	L NAIA Semifinal	4	
2006	Sioux Falls	14–0	10–0	1st	W NAIA Championship	1	
2007	Sioux Falls	13–1	10–0	1st	L NAIA Championship	2	
2008	Sioux Falls	14–0	10–0	1st	W NAIA Championship	1	
2009	Sioux Falls	15–0	10–0	1st	W NAIA Championship	1	
Sioux Falls:		67–3	49–1				
Fresno State Bulldogs (Mountain West Conference) (2020–2021)
2020	Fresno State	3–3	3–3	T–5th			
2021	Fresno State	9–3 (Note: DeBoer was Fresno State's head coach for the regular season before resigning. Lee Marks served as interim head coach for the New Mexico Bowl. The Bulldogs finished the season with an overall record of 10–3.)	6–2	2nd	New Mexico		
Fresno State:		12–6	9–5				
Washington Huskies (Pac-12 Conference) (2022–2023)
2022	Washington	11–2	7–2	T–2nd	W Alamo	8	8
2023	Washington	14–1	9–0	1st	W Sugar^{†}, L CFP NCG^{†}	2	2
Washington:		25–3	16–2				
Alabama Crimson Tide (Southeastern Conference) (2024–present)
2024	Alabama	9–4	5–3	T–4th	L ReliaQuest	17	17
2025	Alabama	11–4	7–1	T–1st	W CFP First Round^{†}, L Rose^{†}	9	9
2026	Alabama	9–2	6–2				
Alabama:		29–10	18–6				
Total:		133–22					
National championship Conference title Conference division title or championship game berth
^{†}Indicates CFP / New Years' Six bowl.; ^{#}Rankings from final Coaches Poll.; ^{°}Rankings from final AP Poll.

== See also ==
- List of college football career coaching winning percentage leaders
