= Mark Samson (American football) =

American football coach (born c. 1958–1959)

Biographical details
- Born: c. 1958 or 1959 (age 67–68); Helena, Montana, U.S.

Coaching career (HC unless noted)

Football
- 1982–1983: Helena HS (MT) (assistant)
- 1984–1986: Broadwater HS (MT) (DC)
- 1987–1989: Missoula Loyola HS (MT)
- 1990–1991: Carroll (MT) (ST/WR)
- 1992–1996: Carroll (MT) (OC/QB)
- 1997–2003: Capital HS (MT)
- 2004–2013: Montana State–Northern
- 2015: Havre HS (MT)
- 2016–2021: Great Falls HS (MT)

Track
- 1988–1989: Missoula Loyola HS (MT)

Head coaching record
- Overall: 45–60 (college football); 104–69 (high school football)
- Tournaments: 0–1 (NAIA playoffs)

Mark Samson (born c. 1958 or 1959) is an American former college and high school football coach. He was the head football coach for Missoula Loyola High School from 1987 to 1989, Capital High School from 1997 to 2003, Montana State University–Northern from 2004 to 2013, Havre High School in 2015, and Great Falls High School from 2016 to his retirement in 2021. He also was an assistant coach for Helena High School, Broadwater High School, and Carroll (MT).

== Personal life ==
Samson's son, Kyle, is the head football coach for Montana Technological University.

== Head coaching record ==
=== College football ===
Year	Team	Overall	Conference	Standing	Bowl/playoffs	NAIA Coaches'^{#}
Montana State–Northern Lights (Frontier Conference) (2004–2013)
2004	Montana State–Northern	1–10	1–7	T–4th		
2005	Montana State–Northern	5–5	3–5	3rd		
2006	Montana State–Northern	9–3	8–2	2nd	L NAIA First Round	11
2007	Montana State–Northern	6–5	5–5	T–3rd		
2008	Montana State–Northern	7–3	7–3	2nd		21
2009	Montana State–Northern	2–9	1–9	T–5th		
2010	Montana State–Northern	3–7	3–7	5th		
2011	Montana State–Northern	5–5	5–5	3rd		
2012	Montana State–Northern	3–7	3–7	7th		
2013	Montana State–Northern	4–6	4–6	T–5th		
Montana State–Northern:		45–60	40–56			
Total:		45–60				

=== High school football ===
Year	Team	Overall	Conference	Standing	Bowl/playoffs
Missoula Loyola Rams () (1987–1989)
1987	Missoula Loyola	1–7			
1988	Missoula Loyola	5–3			
1989	Missoula Loyola	6–2			
Missoula Loyola:		12–12			
Capital Bruins () (1997–2003)
Capital:		67–12			
Havre Blue Ponies () (2015)
2015	Havre	6–3	4–0	1st	
Havre:		6–3	4–0		
Great Falls Red Devils () (2016–2021)
2016	Great Falls	0–11	0–4	5th	
2017	Great Falls	0–9	0–4	5th	
2018	Great Falls	4–7	0–3	4th	
2019	Great Falls	5–5	1–2	3rd	
2020	Great Falls	3–6	1–3	4th	
2021	Great Falls	7–4	1–3	4th	
Great Falls:		19–42	3–19		
Total:		104–69			
National championship Conference title Conference division title or championship game berth
