= 2007 NAIA football rankings =

Legend
	Increase in ranking
	Decrease in ranking
	Not ranked previous week
*	NAIA National Champion
т	Tied with team above or below also with this symbol

One human poll made up the 2007 National Association of Intercollegiate Athletics (NAIA) football rankings, sometimes called the NAIA Coaches' Poll or the football ratings. Once the regular season was complete, the NAIA sponsored a 16-team playoff to determine the year's national champion. A final poll was then taken after completion of the 2007 NAIA Football National Championship.

== Poll release dates ==
The poll release dates were:

- April 30, 2007 (Spring)
- August 13, 2007 (Preseason)
- September 10, 2007
- September 17, 2007
- September 24, 2007
- October 1, 2007
- October 8, 2007
- October 15, 2007
- October 22, 2007
- October 29, 2007
- November 5, 2007
- November 11, 2007 (Final)
- January 14, 2008 (Postseason)

== Week by week poll ==
	Week 0-Spring Apr 30	Week 0-Preseason Aug 13	Week Poll 1 Sep 10	Week Poll 2 Sep 17	Week Poll 3 Sep 24	Week Poll 4 Oct 01	Week Poll 5 Oct 08	Week Poll 6 Oct 15	Week Poll 7 Oct 22	Week Poll 8 Oct 29	Week Poll 9 Nov 05	Week Final Nov 11	Week Postseason Jan 14	
1.	Sioux Falls (SD)	Sioux Falls (SD)	Sioux Falls (SD)	Sioux Falls (SD)	Sioux Falls (SD)	Sioux Falls (SD)	Sioux Falls (SD)	Sioux Falls (SD)	Sioux Falls (SD)	Sioux Falls (SD)	Sioux Falls (SD)	Sioux Falls (SD)	*Carroll (MT)	1.
2.	Saint Francis (IN)	Saint Francis (IN)	Saint Francis (IN)	Saint Francis (IN)	Saint Francis (IN)	Saint Xavier (IL)	Carroll (MT)	Carroll (MT)	Carroll (MT)	Carroll (MT)	Carroll (MT)	Carroll (MT)	Sioux Falls (SD)	2.
3.	Missouri Valley	Missouri Valley	Saint Xavier (IL)	Saint Xavier (IL)	Saint Xavier (IL)	Carroll (MT)	Ohio Dominican	Ohio Dominican	Ohio Dominican	Ohio Dominican	Ohio Dominican	Ohio Dominican	Missouri Valley	3.
4.	Carroll (MT)	Carroll (MT)	Carroll (MT)	Carroll (MT)	Carroll (MT)	Ohio Dominican	Bethel (TN)	Bethel (TN)	Bethel (TN)	Bethel (TN)	Bethel (TN)	Bethel (TN)	Saint Francis (IN)	4.
5.	Saint Xavier (IL)	Saint Xavier (IL)	Northwestern (IA)	Bethel (TN)	Bethel (TN)	Bethel (TN)	Saint Francis (IN)	Saint Francis (IN)	Saint Francis (IN)	Saint Francis (IN)	Saint Francis (IN)	Saint Francis (IN)	Bethel (TN)	5.
6.	Bethel (TN)	Bethel (TN)	Bethel (TN)	Ohio Dominican	Ohio Dominican	Saint Francis (IN)	Saint Xavier (IL)	Saint Xavier (IL)	Saint Xavier (IL)	Saint Xavier (IL)	Saint Xavier (IL)	Jamestown (ND)	Ohio Dominican	6.
7.	Northwestern (IA)	Northwestern (IA)	Montana State-Northern	Georgetown (KY)	Virginia-Wise	Jamestown (ND)	Lindenwood (MO)	Lindenwood (MO)	Lindenwood (MO)	Lindenwood (MO)	Lindenwood (MO)	St. Ambrose (IA)	Morningside (IA)	7.
8.	Georgetown (KY)	Georgetown (KY)	Ohio Dominican	Missouri Valley	Jamestown (ND)	Lindenwood (MO)	Jamestown (ND)	Jamestown (ND)	Northwestern (IA)	Northwestern (IA)	(T) St. Ambrose (IA)	Friends (KS)	Saint Xavier (IL)	8.
9.	St. Ambrose (IA)	St. Ambrose (IA)	Georgetown (KY)	Jamestown (ND)	Lindenwood (MO)	Northwestern (IA)	Northwestern (IA)	Northwestern (IA)	Virginia-Wise	Virginia-Wise	(T) Jamestown (ND)	Missouri Valley	Lindenwood (MO)	9.
10.	Morningside (IA)	Black Hills State (SD)	Missouri Valley	Virginia-Wise	Northwestern (IA)	MidAmerica Nazarene (KS)	MidAmerica Nazarene (KS)	Virginia-Wise	Bethel (KS)	Bethel (KS)	Friends (KS)	Saint Xavier (IL)	St. Ambrose (IA)	10.
11.	Black Hills State (SD)	Morningside (IA)	Jamestown (ND)	Northwestern (IA)	MidAmerica Nazarene (KS)	Virginia-Wise	Virginia-Wise	Bethel (KS)	Malone (OH)	St. Ambrose (IA)	Morningside (IA)	Morningside (IA)	Jamestown (ND)	11.
12.	Montana State-Northern	Montana State-Northern	Friends (KS)	Friends (KS)	Walsh (OH)	Bethel (KS)	Bethel (KS)	Malone (OH)	St. Ambrose (IA)	Jamestown (ND)	Missouri Valley	Lindenwood (MO)	Friends (KS)	12.
13.	Walsh (OH)	Ohio Dominican	Virginia-Wise	Montana State-Northern	Georgetown (KY)	Nebraska Wesleyan	Graceland (IA)	St. Ambrose (IA)	Jamestown (ND)	Friends (KS)	MidAmerica Nazarene (KS)	MidAmerica Nazarene (KS)	MidAmerica Nazarene (KS)	13.
14.	Friends (KS)	Friends (KS)	St. Ambrose (IA)	Lindenwood (MO)	Bethel (KS)	Graceland (IA)	Montana State-Northern	Friends (KS)	Friends (KS)	Missouri Valley	Virginia-Wise	Virginia-Wise	Virginia-Wise	14.
15.	Jamestown (ND)	Walsh (OH)	McKendree (IL)	St. Ambrose (IA)	Nebraska Wesleyan	Walsh (OH)	St. Ambrose (IA)	Missouri Valley	Missouri Valley	Morningside (IA)	Northwestern (IA)	Northwestern (IA)	Northwestern (IA)	15.
16.	Ohio Dominican	Jamestown (ND)	Walsh (OH)	MidAmerica Nazarene (KS)	Graceland (IA)	Montana State-Northern	Malone (OH)	Morningside (IA)	Morningside (IA)	MidAmerica Nazarene (KS)	Bethel (KS)	Bethel (KS)	Cumberlands (KY)	16.
17.	McKendree (IL)	MidAmerica Nazarene (KS)	MidAmerica Nazarene (KS)	Walsh (OH)	Montana Western	St. Ambrose (IA)	Friends (KS)	Cumberlands (KY)	Cumberlands (KY)	Georgetown (KY)	Georgetown (KY)	Cumberlands (KY)	Bethel (KS)	17.
18.	MidAmerica Nazarene (KS)	McKendree (IL)	Lindenwood (MO)	Morningside (IA)	St. Ambrose (IA)	Friends (KS)	Missouri Valley	MidAmerica Nazarene (KS)	MidAmerica Nazarene (KS)	Malone (OH)	Cumberlands (KY)	Northwestern Oklahoma State	Northwestern Oklahoma State	18.
19.	Benedictine (KS)	Benedictine (KS)	(T) Morningside (IA)	Nebraska Wesleyan	(T) Montana State-Northern	Malone (OH)	Urbana (OH)	Georgetown (KY)	Georgetown (KY)	Graceland (IA)	Northwestern Oklahoma State	Sterling (KS)	Sterling (KS)	19.
20.	Kansas Wesleyan	Kansas Wesleyan	(T) Graceland (IA)	Bethel (KS)	(T) Hastings (NB)	Missouri Valley	Morningside (IA)	Graceland (IA)	Graceland (IA)	Northwestern Oklahoma State	Montana Tech	Black Hills State (SD)	Black Hills State (SD)	20.
21.	Bethel (KS)	Northwestern Oklahoma State	Bethel (KS)	Black Hills State (SD)	Friends (KS)	Morningside (IA)	Montana Western	Southern Nazarene (OK)	Southern Nazarene (OK)	Montana Tech	Black Hills State (SD)	(T) Azusa Pacific (CA)	Azusa Pacific (CA)	21.
22.	Langston (OK)	Virginia-Wise	Nebraska Wesleyan	(T) McKendree (IL)	Missouri Valley	(T) Montana Western	Cumberlands (KY)	Urbana (OH)	Montana State-Northern	Cumberlands (KY)	Sterling (KS)	(T) Nebraska Wesleyan	(T) Nebraska Wesleyan	22.
23.	Malone (OH)	Malone (OH)	Southern Nazarene (OK)	(T) Northwestern Oklahoma State	Northwestern Oklahoma State	(T) Cumberlands (KY)	Nebraska Wesleyan	Montana State-Northern	Northwestern Oklahoma State	Midland Lutheran (NB)	Malone (OH)	Georgetown (KY)	(T) Montana Tech	23.
24.	Northwestern Oklahoma State	Montana Tech	Black Hills State (SD)	Graceland (IA)	Evangel (MO)	Urbana (OH)	Shorter (GA)	Northwestern Oklahoma State	Montana Tech	Black Hills State (SD)	Azusa Pacific (CA)	Montana Tech	Georgetown (KY)	24.
25.	Virginia-Wise	Langston (OK)	Northwestern Oklahoma State	Montana Western	Malone (OH)	Hastings (NB)	McKendree (IL)	Montana Tech	Midland Lutheran (NB)	Sterling (KS)	Southern Nazarene (OK)	Malone (OH)	Malone (OH)	25.
	Week 0-Spring Apr 30	Week 0-Preseason Aug 13	Week Poll 1 Sep 10	Week Poll 2 Sep 17	Week Poll 3 Sep 24	Week Poll 4 Oct 01	Week Poll 5 Oct 08	Week Poll 6 Oct 15	Week Poll 7 Oct 22	Week Poll 8 Oct 29	Week Poll 9 Nov 05	Week Final Nov 11	Week Postseason Jan 14	
		Dropped: Bethel (KS)	Dropped: Benedictine (KS); Kansas Wesleyan; Langston (OK); Malone (OH); Montana Tech	Dropped: Southern Nazarene (OK)	Dropped: Black Hills State (SD); McKendree (IL); Morningside (IA)	Dropped: Evangel (MO); Georgetown (KY); Northwestern Oklahoma State	Dropped: Hastings (NB); Walsh (OH)	Dropped: McKendree (IL); Montana Western; Nebraska Wesleyan; Shorter (GA)	Dropped: Urbana (OH)	Dropped: Montana State-Northern; Southern Nazarene (OK)	Dropped: Graceland (IA); Midland Lutheran (NB)	Dropped: Southern Nazarene (OK)	None	

== Leading vote-getters ==
Since the inception of the Coaches' Poll in 1999, the #1 ranking in the various weekly polls has been held by only a select group of teams. Through the postseason poll of the 2007 season, the teams and the number of times they have held the #1 weekly ranking are shown below. The number of times a team has been ranked #1 in the postseason poll (the national champion) is shown in parentheses.

In 1999, the results of a postseason poll, if one was conducted, are not known. Therefore, an additional poll has been presumed, and the #1 postseason ranking has been credited to the postseason tournament champion, the Northwestern Oklahoma State Rangers.

Team	Total #1 Rankings
Carroll (MT)	41 (5)
Sioux Falls (SD)	29 (1)
Georgetown (KY)	23 (2)
Northwestern Oklahoma State	12 (1)
Azusa Pacific (CA)	3
Saint Francis (IN)	3
