= 2021 Fresno State Bulldogs football team =

American college football season

2021 Fresno State Bulldogs football

New Mexico Bowl champion

New Mexico Bowl, W 31–24 vs. UTEP
- Conference: Mountain West Conference
- West Division
- Record: 10–3 (6–2 MW)
- Head coach: Kalen DeBoer (2nd season; regular season); Lee Marks (interim; bowl game)
- Offensive coordinator: Ryan Grubb (3rd season)
- Offensive scheme: Air raid
- Defensive coordinator: William Inge (2nd season)
- Base defense: Multiple 4–2–5
- Home stadium: Bulldog Stadium

2021 Mountain West Conference football standings
	Conf.			Overall
Team	W		L	W		L
Mountain Division
No. 24 Utah State xy$	6	–	2	11	–	3
Air Force x	6	–	2	10	–	3
Boise State	5	–	3	7	–	5
Wyoming	2	–	6	7	–	6
Colorado State	2	–	6	3	–	9
New Mexico	1	–	7	3	–	9
West Division
No. 25 San Diego State xy	7	–	1	12	–	2
Fresno State	6	–	2	10	–	3
Nevada	5	–	3	8	–	5
Hawaii	3	–	5	6	–	7
San Jose State	3	–	5	5	–	7
UNLV	2	–	6	2	–	10
Championship: Utah State 46, San Diego State 13
$ – Conference champion; x – Division champion/co-champions; y – Championship game participant; Rankings from AP Poll

The 2021 Fresno State Bulldogs football team represented California State University, Fresno as a member of the West Division of the Mountain West Conference (MW) during the 2021 NCAA Division I FBS football season. The Bulldogs were led by second-year head coach Kalen DeBoer during the regular season and Lee Marks as interim head coach for their bowl game. They compiled an overall record of 10–3 with a mark of 6–2 in conference play, plaching second in the MW's West Division. Fresno State was invited to the New Mexico Bowl, where they beat UTEP. The team played home games at Bulldog Stadium in Fresno, California.

== Schedule ==
Date	Time	Opponent	Rank	Site	TV	Result	Attendance
August 28	11:00 a.m.	UConn*		Bulldog Stadium; Fresno, CA	CBSSN	W 45–0	26,043
September 4	11:00 a.m.	at No. 11 Oregon*		Autzen Stadium; Eugene, OR	P12N	L 24–31	43,276
September 11	7:00 p.m.	Cal Poly*		Bulldog Stadium; Fresno, CA	KFRE-TV	W 63–10	30,119
September 18	7:45 p.m.	at No. 13 UCLA*		Rose Bowl; Pasadena, CA	P12N	W 40–37	50,698
September 24	7:00 p.m.	UNLV	No. 22	Bulldog Stadium; Fresno, CA	CBSSN	W 38–30	35,093
October 2	8:00 p.m.	at Hawaii	No. 18	Clarence T. C. Ching Athletics Complex; Honolulu, HI (rivalry)	CBSSN	L 24–27	0
October 16	12:30 p.m.	at Wyoming		War Memorial Stadium; Laramie, WY	FS2	W 17–0	20,002
October 23	4:00 p.m.	Nevada^{†}		Bulldog Stadium; Fresno, CA	FS1	W 34–32	33,012
October 30	7:30 p.m.	at No. 21 San Diego State		Dignity Health Sports Park; Carson, CA (rivalry)	CBSSN	W 30–20	11,034
November 6	7:00 p.m.	Boise State	No. 23	Bulldog Stadium; Fresno, CA (rivalry)	CBSSN	L 14–40	41,031
November 13	4:00 p.m.	New Mexico		Bulldog Stadium; Fresno, CA	Stadium	W 34–7	35,020
November 25	12:30 p.m.	at San Jose State		CEFCU Stadium; San José, CA (rivalry)	FS1	W 40–9	15,323
December 18	11:15 a.m.	vs. UTEP*		University Stadium; Albuquerque, NM (New Mexico Bowl)	ESPN	W 31–24	16,422
*Non-conference game; ^{†}Homecoming; Rankings from AP Poll (and CFP Rankings, after November 2) - Released prior to game; All times are in Pacific time

== Rankings ==
Ranking movements Legend: ██ Increase in ranking ██ Decrease in ranking — = Not ranked RV = Received votes
	Week															
Poll	Pre	1	2	3	4	5	6	7	8	9	10	11	12	13	14	Final
AP	—	—	RV	22	18	RV	—	—	—	25	—	—	—	RV	—	RV
Coaches	—	RV	RV	25	21	RV	RV	RV	RV	RV	—	—	—	RV	RV	RV
CFP	Not released									23	—	—	—	—	—	Not released

== Game summaries ==
=== UConn ===
Game One – UConn Huskies (0–0) at Fresno State Bulldogs (0–0)

Quarter	1	2	3	4	Total
Huskies	0	0	0	0	0
Bulldogs	7	24	7	7	45

at Bulldog Stadium • Fresno, California

- Date: Saturday, August 28, 2021
- Game time: 11:00 a.m. PST
- Game weather: Sunny • Temperature: 92 °F (33 °C) 117 degrees on the field • Wind: W 2 mph
- Game attendance: 26,043
- TV announcers (CBSSN): Rich Waltz (play-by-play), Aaron Taylor (analyst) & Jenny Dell (sideline)

Game information

First quarter

- (2:40) FRES – Arron Mosby 31-yard fumble return, Cesar Silva kick (Fresno State 7–0)

Second quarter

- (11:34) FRES – Ty Jones 9-yard pass from Jake Haener, Cesar Silva kick (Drive: 4 plays, 69 yards, 1:43; Fresno State 14–0)
- (3:50) FRES – Ronnie Rivers 61-yard pass from Jake Haener, Cesar Silva kick (Drive: 1 plays, 61 yards, 0:10; Fresno State 21–0)
- (1:46) FRES – Jalen Cropper 86-yard pass from Jake Haener, Cesar Silva kick (Drive: 1 plays, 86 yards, 0:14; Fresno State 28–0)
- (0:00) FRES – Cesar Silva 24-yard field goal, (Drive: 9 plays, 71 yards, 1:12; Fresno State 31–0)

Third quarter

- (3:21) FRES – Jordan Mims 8-yard run, Cesar Silva kick (Drive: 10 plays, 48 yards, 3:44; Fresno State 38–0)

Fourth quarter

- (11:30) FRES – Raymond Pauwels Jr. 1-yard pass from Logan Fife, Cesar Silva kick (Drive: 10 plays, 57 yards, 3:45; Fresno State 45–0)

Statistics	UConn	FRES
First downs	9	25
Plays–yards	61–107	77–538
Rushes–yards	31–35	38–156
Passing yards	72	382
Passing: comp–att–int	14–30–0	27–39–1
Time of possession	29:03	30:57

Team	Category	Player	Statistics
UConn	Passing	Jack Zergiotis	12/24, 61 yards
UConn	Rushing	Kevin Mensah	11 carries, 31 yards
UConn	Receiving	Cameron Ross	5 receptions, 37 yards
Fresno State	Passing	Jake Haener	20/26, 331 yards, 3 TD
Fresno State	Rushing	Ronnie Rivers	13 carries, 58 yards
Fresno State	Receiving	Jalen Cropper	3 receptions, 87 yards, TD

=== No. 11 Oregon ===
Game Two – Fresno State Bulldogs (1–0) at #11 Oregon Ducks (0–0)

Quarter	1	2	3	4	Total
Bulldogs	0	13	8	3	24
No. 11 Ducks	14	7	0	10	31

at Autzen Stadium • Eugene, Oregon

- Date: Saturday, September 4, 2021
- Game time: 11:00 a.m. PST
- Game weather: Sunny • Temperature: 69 °F (21 °C) • Wind: SW 2 mph
- Game attendance: 43,276
- Referee: Mark Duddy
- TV announcers (P12N): Roxy Bernstein (play-by-play) & Lincoln Kennedy (analyst)

Game information

First quarter

- (8:07) ORE – CJ Verdell 2-yard run, Camden Lewis kick (Drive: 3 plays, 3 yards, 1:11; Oregon 7–0)
- (6:40) ORE – Travis Dye 4-yard run, Camden Lewis kick (Drive: 3 plays, 27 yards, 0:58; Oregon 14–0)

Second quarter

- (14:16) FRES – Abraham Montano 33-yard run field goal (Drive: 12 plays, 69 yards, 5:13; Oregon 14–3)
- (3:31) FRES – Abraham Montano 39-yard run field goal (Drive: 14 plays, 68 yards, 6:09; Oregon 14–6)
- (1:16) ORE – Johnny Johnson III 32-yard pass from Anthony Brown, Camden Lewis kick (Drive: 6 plays, 74 yards, 2:15; Oregon 21–6)
- (0:07) FRES – Jalen Cropper 17-yard pass from Jake Haener, Adam Montano kick (Drive: 10 plays, 79 yards, 1:09; Oregon 21–13)

Third quarter

- (6:45) FRES – Jake Haener 2-yard run, Juan Rodriguez–Jake Haener 2-point pass (Drive: 9 plays, 85 yards, 4:26; Tied 21–21)

Fourth quarter

- (13:03) FRES – Adam Montano 22-yard field goal (Drive: 5 plays, 22 yards, 1:51; Fresno State 24–21)
- (7:41) ORE– Camden Lewis 25-yard field goal (Drive: 7 plays, 25 yards, 2:35; Tied 24–24)
- (2:57) ORE– Anthony Brown 30-yard run, Camden Lewis kick (Drive: 6 plays, 63 yards, 3:04; Oregon 31–24)

Statistics	FRES	ORE
First downs	23	20
Plays–yards	76–375	70–364
Rushes–yards	30–77	49–192
Passing yards	298	172
Passing: comp–att–int	30–43–0	15–24–0
Time of possession	30:33	29:27

Team	Category	Player	Statistics
Fresno State	Passing	Jake Haener	30/43, 298 yards, TD
Fresno State	Rushing	Jordan Mims	4 carries, 47 yards
Fresno State	Receiving	Josh Kelly	6 receptions, 84 yards
Oregon	Passing	Anthony Brown	15/24, 172 yards, TD
Oregon	Rushing	C. J. Verdell	18 carries, 74 yards, TD
Oregon	Receiving	Johnny Johnson III	3 receptions, 76 yards, TD

=== Cal Poly ===
Game Three – Cal Poly Mustangs (1–0) at Fresno State Bulldogs (1–1)

Quarter	1	2	3	4	Total
Mustangs	0	10	0	0	10
Bulldogs	7	28	21	7	63

at Bulldog Stadium • Fresno, California

- Date: Saturday, September 11, 2021
- Game time: 7:00 p.m. PST
- Game weather: Sunny • Temperature: 90 °F (32 °C) • Wind: NW 8 mph
- TV announcers (KFRE-TV): Ralph Wood (play-by-play), Cameron Worrell (analyst) & Kevin Miller (sideline)

Game information

First quarter

- (0:37) FRES – Jake Haener 2-yard run, Abraham Montano kick (Drive: 8 plays, 80 yards, 3:05; Fresno State 7–0)

Second quarter

- (14:31) FRES – Jalen Cropper 24-yard pass from Jake Haener, Abraham Montano kick (Drive: 1 plays, 24 yards, 0:07; Fresno State 14–0)
- (11:13) CP – Jaden Ohlsen 47-yard field goal (Drive: 8 plays, 45 yards, 3:18; Fresno State 14–3)
- (9:41) FRES – Jake Haener 1-yard run, Abraham Montano kick (Drive: 4 plays, 69 yards, 1:26; Fresno State 21–3)
- (7:44) FRES – Josh Kelly 51-yard pass from Jalen Cropper, Abraham Montano kick (Drive: 1 plays, 51 yards, 0:11; Fresno State 28–3)
- (2:25) FRES – Josh Kelly 14-yard pass from Jake Haener, Abraham Montano kick (Drive: 7 plays, 85 yards, 2:56; Fresno State 35–3)
- (0:00) CP – Chris Coleman 5-yard pass from Spencer Brasch, Jaden Ohlsen kick (Drive: 4 plays, 5 yards, 0:46; Fresno State 35–10)

Third quarter

- (11:24) FRES – Ronnie Rivers 5-yard run, Abraham Montano kick (Drive: 5 plays, 33 yards, 2:33; Fresno State 42–10)
- (9:23) FRES – Zane Pope 62-yard pass from Jake Haener, Abraham Montano kick (Drive: 3 plays, 81 yards, 0:54; Fresno State 49–10)
- (5:57) FRES – Keric Wheatfall 53-yard pass from Jake Haener, Abraham Montano kick (Drive: 4 plays, 65 yards, 1:33; Fresno State 56–10)

Fourth quarter

- (14:01) FRES – Jordan Wilmore 10-yard run, Abraham Montano kick (Drive: 6 plays, 40 yards, 2:08; Fresno State 63–10)

Statistics	CP	FRES
First downs	13	25
Plays–yards	74–274	67–671
Rushes–yards	35–53	38–196
Passing yards	221	475
Passing: comp–att–int	19–37–1	22–29–0
Time of possession	30:53	29:07

Team	Category	Player	Statistics
Cal Poly	Passing	Spencer Brasch	18/33, 212 yards, TD, INT
Cal Poly	Rushing	Chuby Dunu	10 carries, 32 yards
Cal Poly	Receiving	Chris Coleman	4 receptions, 63 yards, TD
Fresno State	Passing	Jake Haener	17/22, 380 yards, 4 TD
Fresno State	Rushing	Ronnie Rivers	14 carries, 64 yards, TD
Fresno State	Receiving	Josh Kelly	3 receptions 127 yards, 2 TD

=== No. 13 UCLA ===
Game Four – Fresno State Bulldogs (2–1) at #13 UCLA Bruins (2–0)

Quarter	1	2	3	4	Total
Bulldogs	6	17	3	14	40
No. 13 Bruins	7	3	7	20	37

at Rose Bowl • Pasadena, California

- Date: Saturday, September 18, 2021
- Game time: 7:45 p.m. PST
- Game weather: Clear • Temperature: 65 °F (18 °C) • Wind: WSW 6 mph
- Game attendance: 50,698
- Referee: Francisco Villar
- TV announcers (P12N): Ted Robinson (play-by-play) & Yogi Roth (analyst)

Game information

First quarter

- (5:54) FRES – Ronnie Rivers 1-yard run, kick failed (Drive: 10 plays, 55 yards, 5:21; Fresno State 6–0)
- (3:59) UCLA – Zach Charbonnet 6-yard run, Nicholas Barr-Mira kick (Drive: 5 plays, 73 yards, 1:49; UCLA 7–6)

Second quarter

- (11:49) FRES – Jalen Cropper 1-yard run, Abraham Montano kick (Drive: 14 plays, 79 yards, 7:06; Fresno State 13–7)
- (9:43) UCLA – Nicholas Barr-Mira 39-yard field goal (Drive: 4 plays, 6 yards, 1:56; Fresno State 13–10)
- (6:37) FRES – Ronnie Rivers 36-yard run, Abraham Montano kick (Drive: 7 plays, 75 yards, 3:06; Fresno State 20–10)
- (0:08) FRES – Abraham Montano 21-yard field goal (Drive: 6 plays, 16 yards, 0:50; Fresno State 23–10)

Third quarter

- (12:29) UCLA – Kam Brown 39-yard pass from Dorian Thompson-Robinson, Nicholas Barr-Mira kick (Drive: 6 plays, 75 yards, 2:24; Fresno State 23–17)
- (7:33) FRES – Abraham Montano 39-yard field goal (Drive: 5 plays, 30 yards, 0:55; Fresno State 26–17)

Fourth quarter

- (8:10) UCLA – Kyle Philips 42-yard pass from Dorian Thompson-Robinson, Nicholas Barr-Mira kick (Drive: 3 plays, 57 yards, 1:13; Fresno State 26–24)
- (7:27) UCLA – Zach Charbonnet 3-yard run, 2 point conversion failed (Drive: 3 plays, 18 yards, 0:30; UCLA 30–26)
- (2:55) FRES – Erik Brooks 19-yard pass from Jake Haener, Abraham Montano kick (Drive: 10 plays, 75 yards, 4:32; Fresno State 33–30)
- (0:54) UCLA – Kyle Philips 15-yard pass from Dorian Thompson-Robinson, Nicholas Barr-Mira kick (Drive: 9 plays, 75 yards, 2:01; UCLA 37–33)
- (0:14) FRES – Jalen Cropper 13-yard pass from Jake Haener, Abraham Montano (Drive: 6 plays, 75 yards, 0:40; Fresno State 40–37)

Statistics	FRES	UCLA
First downs	33	16
Plays–yards	91–569	53–395
Rushes–yards	37–114	29–117
Passing yards	455	278
Passing: comp–att–int	39–54–1	14–24–0
Time of possession	40:20	19:14

Team	Category	Player	Statistics
Fresno State	Passing	Jake Haener	39/53, 455 yards, 2 TD, INT
Fresno State	Rushing	Ronnie Rivers	21 carries, 136 yards, 2 TD
Fresno State	Receiving	Jalen Cropper	14 receptions, 141 yards, TD
UCLA	Passing	Dorian Thompson-Robinson	14/24, 278 yards, 3 TD
UCLA	Rushing	Dorian Thompson-Robinson	13 carries, 67 yards
UCLA	Receiving	Kyle Philips	7 receptions, 113 yards, 2 TD

=== UNLV ===
Game Five – UNLV Rebels (0–3) at #22 Fresno State Bulldogs (3–1)

Quarter	1	2	3	4	Total
Rebels	14	0	7	9	30
No. 22 Bulldogs	0	9	13	16	38

at Bulldog Stadium • Fresno, California

- Date: Friday, September 24, 2021
- Game time: 7:00 p.m. PST
- Game weather: Smokey • Temperature: 92 °F (33 °C) • Wind: E 3 mph
- Game attendance: 35,093
- Referee: Timothy Davis
- TV announcers (CBSSN): Jason Knapp (play-by-play) & Donte Whitner (analyst)

Game information

First quarter

- (10:00) UNLV – Steve Jenkins 9-yard pass from Doug Brumfield, (Daniel Gutierrez kick) (Drive: 7 plays, 60 yards, 2:47; UNLV 7–0)
- (1:16) UNLV – Charles Williams 1-yard run, (Daniel Gutierrez kick) (Drive: 14 plays, 95 yards, 7:24; UNLV 14–0)

Second quarter

- (11:38) FRES – Cesar Silva 25-yard field goal (Drive: 11 plays, 67 yards, 4:32; UNLV 14–3)
- (0:32) FRES – Erik Brooks 18-yard pass from Jake Haener, (run failed) (Drive: 5 plays, 46 yards, 1:43; UNLV 14–9)

Third quarter

- (14:41) UNLV – Tyleek Collins 80-yard pass from Doug Brumfield, (Daniel Gutierrez kick) (Drive: 1 plays, 80 yards, 0:14; UNLV 21–9)
- (7:35) FRES – Jalen Cropper 4-yard pass from Jake Haener, (Cesar Silva kick) (Drive: 8 plays, 68 yards, 4:23; UNLV 21–16)
- (3:47) FRES – Jalen Cropper 23-yard pass from Jake Haener, (pass failed) (Drive: 4 plays, 80 yards, 1:19; Fresno State 22–21)

Fourth quarter

- (12:21) FRES – Jalen Cropper 25-yard pass from Jake Haener, (Cesar Silva kick) (Drive: 7 plays, 85 yards, 3:15; Fresno State 29–21)
- (9:57) UNLV – Courtney Reese 6-yard run, (pass failed) (Drive: 6 plays, 75 yards, 2:24; Fresno State 29–27)
- (6:38) UNLV – Daniel Guttierez 30-yard field goal (Drive: 6 plays, 32 yards, 2:58; UNLV 30–29)
- (4:53) FRES – Jalen Cropper 26-yard pass from Jake Haener, (pass failed) (Drive: 4 plays, 61 yards, 1:37; Fresno State 35–30)
- (2:29) FRES – Cesar Silva 31-yard field goal (Drive: 4 plays, 8 yards, 1:30; Fresno State 38–30)

Statistics	UNLV	FRES
First downs	18	23
Plays–yards	64–433	64–461
Rushes–yards	36–152	23–83
Passing yards	281	378
Passing: comp–att–int	15–28–0	30–42–1
Time of possession	46:36	28:24

Team	Category	Player	Statistics
UNLV	Passing	Doug Brumfield	6/13, 143 yards, 2 TD
UNLV	Rushing	Charles Williams	19 carries, 102 yards, TD
UNLV	Receiving	Charles Williams	3 receptions, 96 yards
Fresno State	Passing	Jake Haener	30/42, 378 yards, 5 TD, INT
Fresno State	Rushing	Ronnie Rivers	14 carries, 48 yards
Fresno State	Receiving	Keric Wheatfall	5 receptions, 115 yards

=== Hawaii ===
Game Six – #18 Fresno State Bulldogs (4–1) at Hawaii Rainbow Warriors (2–3)

Quarter	1	2	3	4	Total
No. 18 Bulldogs	7	7	10	0	24
Rainbow Warriors	10	0	0	17	27

at Clarence T. C. Ching Athletics Complex • Honolulu, Hawaii

- Date: Saturday, October 2, 2021
- Game time: 8:00 p.m. PST
- Game weather: Cloudy • Temperature: 85 °F (29 °C) • Wind: E 13 mph
- Game attendance: 0
- Referee: Cal McNeill
- TV announcers (CBSSN): Noah Eagle (play-by-play) & Aaron Murray (analyst)

Game information

First quarter

- (10:19) HAW – Calvin Turner 1-yard run, (Matthew Shipley kick) (Drive: 11 plays, 72 yards, 3:49; Hawai'i 7–0)
- (5:06) HAW – Matthew Shipley 34-yard field goal (Drive: 6 plays, 63 yards, 2:34; Hawai'i 10–0)
- (4:13) FRES – Zane Pope 65-yard pass from Jake Haener, (Cesar Silva kick) (Drive: 3 plays, 75 yards, 0:43; Hawai'i 10–7)

Second quarter

- (9:06) FRES – Zane Pope 7-yard pass from Jake Haener, (Cesar Silva kick) (Drive: 9 plays, 52 yards, 4:08; Fresno State 14–10)

Third quarter

- (9:22) FRES – Jalen Cropper 35-yard pass from Jake Haener, (Cesar Silva kick) (Drive: 7 plays, 80 yards, 3:20; Fresno State 21–10)
- (4:29) FRES – Cesar Silva 48-yard field goal (Drive: 5 plays, 30 yards, 2:11; Fresno State 24–10)

Fourth quarter

- (12:06) HAW – Caleb Phillips 26-yard pass from Brayden Schager (Matthew Shipley kick) (Drive: 4 plays, 44 yards, 2:07; Fresno State 24–17)
- (7:05) HAW – Calvin Turner Jr. 18-yard pass from Brayden Schager (Matthew Shipley kick) (Drive: 6 plays, 60 yards, 2:55; Tied 24–24)
- (3:33) HAW – Matthew Shipley 33-yard field goal (Drive: 8 plays, 28 yards, 2:54; Hawai'i 27–24)

Statistics	FRES	HAW
First downs	31	21
Plays–yards	82–505	71–348
Rushes–yards	31–117	44–232
Passing yards	388	116
Passing: comp–att–int	28–51–4	11–27–0
Time of possession	31:18	28:42

Team	Category	Player	Statistics
Fresno State	Passing	Jake Haener	28/50, 388 yards, 3 TD, 4 INT
Fresno State	Rushing	Ronnie Rivers	15 carries, 74 yards
Fresno State	Receiving	Zane Pope	5 receptions, 113 yards, TD
Hawaii	Passing	Brayden Schager	11/27, 116 yards, 2 TD
Hawaii	Rushing	Dae Dae Hunter	21 carries, 127 yards
Hawaii	Receiving	Calvin Turner	4 receptions, 41 yards, TD

=== Wyoming ===
Game Seven – Fresno State Bulldogs (4–2) at Wyoming Cowboys (4–1)

Quarter	1	2	3	4	Total
Bulldogs	7	0	7	3	17
Cowboys	0	0	0	0	0

at War Memorial Stadium • Laramie, Wyoming

- Date: Saturday, October 16, 2021
- Game time: 12:30 p.m. PST
- Game weather: Cloudy • Temperature: 47 °F (8 °C) • Wind: WSW 9 mph
- TV announcers (FS2): Dan Hellie (play-by-play) & Petros Papadakis (analyst)

Game information

First quarter

- (6:57) FRES – Juan Rodriguez 2-yard pass from Jake Haener, (Cesar Silva kick) (Drive: 10 plays, 41 yards, 5:47; Fresno State 7–0)

Second quarter

- No scoring plays.

Third quarter

- (1:52) FRES – Jalen Cropper 3-yard pass from Jake Haener, (Cesar Silva kick) (Drive: 3 plays, 6 yards, 0:36; Fresno State 14–0)

Fourth quarter

- (10:25) FRES – Cesar Silva 41-yard field goal (Drive: 4 plays, 3 yards, 0:55; Fresno State 17–0)

Statistics	FRES	WYO
First downs	14	15
Plays–yards	71–259	63–271
Rushes–yards	43–163	33–128
Passing yards	96	143
Passing: comp–att–int	15–28–0	9–30–4
Time of possession	32:40	27:20

Team	Category	Player	Statistics
Fresno State	Passing	Jake Haener	15/28, 96 yards, 2 TD
Fresno State	Rushing	Jordan Mims	13 carries, 78 yards
Fresno State	Receiving	Zane Pope	2 receptions, 33 yards
Wyoming	Passing	Sean Chambers	8/23, 111 yards, 3 INT
Wyoming	Rushing	Sean Chambers	12 carries, 51 yards
Wyoming	Receiving	Ayden Eberhardt	2 receptions, 45 yards

=== Nevada ===
Game Eight – Nevada Wolf Pack (5–1) at Fresno State Bulldogs (5–2)

Quarter	1	2	3	4	Total
Wolf Pack	3	7	6	16	32
Bulldogs	7	7	14	6	34

at Bulldog Stadium • Fresno, California

- Date: Saturday, October 23, 2021
- Game time: 4:00 p.m. PST
- Game weather: Partly Cloudy • Temperature: 69 °F (21 °C) • Wind: NW 8 mph
- Game attendance: 33,012
- TV announcers (FS1): Dan Hellie (play-by-play) & Petros Papadakis (analyst)

Game information

First quarter

- (5:37) NEV – Brandon Talton 32-yard field goal (Drive: 10 plays, 48 yards, 3:13; Nevada 3–0)
- (5:08) FRES – Ronnie Rivers 64-yard run, (Cesar Silva kick) (Drive: 3 plays, 75 yards, 0:28; Fresno State 7–3)

Second quarter

- (14:11) FRES – Jordan Mims 1-yard run, (Cesar Silva kick) (Drive: 10 plays, 91 yards, 3:19; Fresno State 14–3)
- (10:10) NEV – Cole Turner 2-yard pass from Carson Strong, (Brandon Talton kick) (Drive: 2 plays, 12 yards, 0:41; Fresno State 14–10)

Third quarter

- (13:21) FRES – Keric Wheatfall 11-yard pass from Jake Haener, (Cesar Silva kick) (Drive: 5 plays, 65 yards, 1:39; Fresno State 21–10)
- (8:46) NEV – Justin Lockheart 30-yard pass from Carson Strong, (Two-point pass conversion failed) (Drive: 10 plays, 65 yards, 4:29; Fresno State 21–16)
- (4:50) FRES – Jordan Mims 7-yard pass from Jake Haener, (Cesar Silva kick) (Drive: 9 plays, 88 yards, 3:52; Fresno State 28–16)

Fourth quarter

- (14:56) NEV – Romeo Doubs 11-yard pass from Carson Strong, (Brandon Talton kick) (Drive: 9 plays, 68 yards, 4:46; Fresno State 28–23)
- (12:37) FRES – Cesar Silva 47-yard field goal (Drive: 8 plays, 46 yards, 2:19; Fresno State 31–23)
- (5:48) FRES – Cesar Silva 43-yard field goal (Drive: 9 plays, 39 yards, 4:16; Fresno State 34–23)
- (4:21) NEV – Brandon Talton 38-yard field goal (Drive: 7 plays, 58 yards, 1:21; Fresno State 34–26)
- (0:02) NEV – Cole Turner 12-yard pass from Carson Strong, (Two-point pass conversion failed) (Drive: 8 plays, 90 yards, 0:51; Fresno State 34–32)

Statistics	NEV	FRES
First downs	30	24
Plays–yards	80–501	69–474
Rushes–yards	21–47	30–205
Passing yards	476	256
Passing: comp–att–int	49–61–1	26–38–0
Time of possession	34:03	25:55

Team	Category	Player	Statistics
Nevada	Passing	Carson Strong	49/61, 476 yards, 4 TD, INT
Nevada	Rushing	Toa Taua	12 carries, 62 yards
Nevada	Receiving	Romeo Doubs	19 receptions, 203 yards, TD
Fresno State	Passing	Jake Haener	26/38, 256 yards, 2 TD
Fresno State	Rushing	Ronnie Rivers	23 carries 134 yards, TD
Fresno State	Receiving	Keric Wheatfall	5 receptions, 84 yards, TD

=== No. 21 San Diego State ===
Game Nine – Fresno State Bulldogs (6–2) at #21 San Diego State Aztecs (7–0)

Quarter	1	2	3	4	Total
Bulldogs	7	13	3	7	30
No. 21 Aztecs	0	7	6	7	20

at Dignity Health Sports Park • Carson, California

- Date: Saturday, October 30, 2021
- Game time: 7:30 p.m. PST
- Game weather: Partly Cloudy • Temperature: 63 °F (17 °C) • Wind: W 5 mph
- Game attendance: 11,034
- Referee: Steve Baron
- TV announcers (CBSSN): Dave Ryan (play-by-play), Aaron Murray (analyst), & Amanda Guerra (sideline)

Game information

First quarter

- (3:53) FRES – Jordan Mims 13-yard run, (Cesar Silva kick) (Drive: 15 plays, 86 yards, 6:51; Fresno State 7–0)

Second quarter

- (14:17) FRES – Keric Wheatfall 16-yard pass from Jake Haener, (Cesar Silva kick) (Drive: 4 plays, 31 yards, 1:38; Fresno State 14–0)
- (9:04) FRES – Cesar Silva 49-yard field goal (Drive: 5 plays, 60 yards, 2:49; Fresno State 17–0)
- (4:32) FRES – Cesar Silva 27-yard field goal (Drive: 7 plays, 75 yards, 2:48; Fresno State 20–0)
- (2:15) SDSU – Tyrell Shavers 19-yard pass from Lance Johnson, (Matt Araiza kick) (Drive: 6 plays, 82 yards, 2:12; Fresno State 20–7)

Third quarter

- (4:00) FRES – Cesar Silva 42-yard field goal (Drive: 7 plays, 24 yards, 2:24; Fresno State 23–7)
- (0:13) SDSU – Greg Bell 3-yard run, (Two-point conversion failed) (Drive: 10 plays, 80 yards, 3:38; Fresno State 23–13)

Fourth quarter

- (4:28) FRES – Jordan Mims 16-yard run, (Cesar Silva kick) (Drive: 2 plays, 31 yards, 0:46; Fresno State 30–13)
- (1:06) SDSU – William Haskell 7-yard run, (Matt Araiza kick) (Drive: 11 plays, 75 yards, 3:22; Fresno State 30–20)

Statistics	FRES	SDSU
First downs	24	23
Plays–yards	77–484	72–427
Rushes–yards	34–179	33–165
Passing yards	306	247
Passing: comp–att–int	25–43–0	17–38–2
Time of possession	32:58	27:02

Team	Category	Player	Statistics
Fresno State	Passing	Jake Haener	25/42, 306 yards, TD
Fresno State	Rushing	Jordan Mims	29 carries, 168 yards, 2 TD
Fresno State	Receiving	Josh Kelly	5 receptions, 107 yards
San Diego State	Passing	Lucas Johnson	14/31, 220 yards, TD, 2 INT
San Diego State	Rushing	Greg Bell	15 carries, 63 yards, TD
San Diego State	Receiving	Elijah Kothe	5 receptions, 105 yards

=== Boise State ===
Game Ten – Boise State Broncos (4–4) at #23 Fresno State Bulldogs (7–2)

Quarter	1	2	3	4	Total
Broncos	10	6	7	17	40
No. 23 Bulldogs	0	7	0	7	14

at Bulldog Stadium • Fresno, California

- Date: Saturday, November 6, 2021
- Game time: 4:00 p.m. PST
- Game weather: Partly Cloudy • Temperature: 69 °F (21 °C) • Wind: NW 8 mph
- TV announcers (CBSSN): John Sadak (play-by-play), Aaron Murray (analyst), & Lindsay Rhodes (sideline)

Game information

First quarter

- (7:17) BSU – Jonah Dalmas 47-yard field goal (Drive: 7 plays, 45 yards, 3:27; Boise State 3–0)
- (6:38) BSU – Andrew Van Buren 1-yard run, (Jonah Dalmas kick) (Drive: 2 plays, 41 yards, 0:27; Boise State 10–0)

Second quarter

- (12:45) BSU – Jonah Dalmas 27-yard field goal (Drive: 5 plays, 51 yards, 2:04; Boise State 13–0)
- (5:50) FRES – Keric Wheatfall 10-yard pass from Jake Haener, (Cesar Silva kick) (Drive: 5 plays, 54 yards, 2:01; Boise State 13–7)
- (0:41) BSU – Jonah Dalmas 32-yard field goal (Drive: 8 plays, 52 yards, 2:33; Boise State 16–7)

Third quarter

- (6:43) BSU – Khalil Shakir 10-yard pass from Hank Bachmeier, (Jonah Dalmas kick) (Drive: 11 plays, 80 yards, 4:09; Boise State 23–7)

Fourth quarter

- (13:30) BSU – Jonah Dalmas 27-yard field goal (Drive: 11 plays, 49 yards, 4:42; Boise State 26–7)
- (7:41) BSU – Andrew Van Buren 1-yard run, (Jonah Dalams kick) (Drive: 10 plays, 79 yards, 5:12; Boise State 33–7)
- (2:48) BSU – Tyler Crowe 7-yard run, (Jonah Dalams kick) (Drive: 5 plays, 23 yards, 3:01; Boise State 40–7)
- (1:10) FRES – Zane Pope 5-yard pass from Jake Haener, (Cesar Silva kick) (Drive: 6 plays, 75 yards, 1:32; Boise State 40–14)

Statistics	BSU	FRES
First downs	24	18
Plays–yards	79–470	65–346
Rushes–yards	50–187	27–77
Passing yards	283	279
Passing: comp–att–int	15–28–1	22–38–3
Time of possession	36:09	23:51

Team	Category	Player	Statistics
Boise State	Passing	Hank Bachmeier	15/27, 283 yards, TD
Boise State	Rushing	George Holani	21 carries, 117 yards
Boise State	Receiving	George Holani	2 receptions, 69 yards
Fresno State	Passing	Jake Haener	22/38, 279 yards, 2 TD, 3 INT
Fresno State	Rushing	Ronnie Rivers	12 carries, 79 yards
Fresno State	Receiving	Keric Wheatfall	6 receptions, 81 yards, TD

=== New Mexico ===
Game Eleven – New Mexico Lobos (3–6) at Fresno State Bulldogs (7–3)

Quarter	1	2	3	4	Total
Lobos	0	0	7	0	7
Bulldogs	7	17	10	0	34

at Bulldog Stadium • Fresno, California

- Date: Saturday, November 13, 2021
- Game time: 4:00 p.m. PST
- Game weather: Sunny • Temperature: 67 °F (19 °C) • Wind: NW 3 mph
- Game attendance: 35,020
- Referee: Kevin Hassell
- TV announcers (Stadium): Ari Wolfe (play-by-play), JJ Raterink (analyst)

Game information

First quarter

- (10:33) FRES – Ronnie Rivers 4-yard run, (Cesar Silva kick) (Drive: 6 plays, 31 yards, 3:25; Fresno State 7–0)

Second quarter

- (13:31) FRES – Raymond Pauwels Jr. 23-yard pass from Jake Haener, (Cesar Silva kick) (Drive: 9 plays, 71 yards, 4:19; Fresno State 14–0)
- (6:42) FRES – Josh Kelly 21-yard pass from Jake Haener, (Cesar Silva kick) (Drive: 9 plays, 64 yards, 5:00; Fresno State 21–0)
- (0:28) FRES – Cesar Silva 51-yard field goal (Drive: 10 plays, 38 yards, 3:53; Fresno State 24–0)

Third quarter

- (13:22) FRES – Cesar Silva 48-yard field goal (Drive: 6 plays, 29 yards, 1:38; Fresno State 27–0)
- (7:45) UNM – Aaron Dumas 1-yard run, (Andrew Shelley kick) (Drive: 10 plays, 74 yards, 5:29; Fresno State 27–7)
- (4:40) FRES – Jordan Mims 4-yard pass from Jake Haener, (Cesar Silva kick) (Drive: 6 plays, 75 yards, 2:59; Fresno State 34–7)

Fourth quarter

- No scoring plays.

Statistics	UNM	FRES
First downs	7	23
Plays–yards	46–196	71–399
Rushes–yards	38–162	40–97
Passing yards	196	397
Passing: comp–att–int	2–8–1	24–37–0
Time of possession	26:40	33:20

Team	Category	Player	Statistics
New Mexico	Passing	Isaiah Chavez	2/7, 34 yards, INT
New Mexico	Rushing	Aaron Dumas	23 carries, 143 yards, TD
New Mexico	Receiving	Trace Bruckler	1 reception, 25 yards
Fresno State	Passing	Jake Haener	24/31, 300 yards, 3 TD
Fresno State	Rushing	Ronnie Rivers	20 carries, 71 yards, TD
Fresno State	Receiving	Jordan Mims	4 receptions, 103 yards, TD

=== San Jose State ===
Game Twelve – Fresno State Bulldogs (8–3) at San Jose State Spartans (5–6)

Quarter	1	2	3	4	Total
Bulldogs	7	16	10	7	40
Spartans	3	6	0	0	9

at CEFCU Stadium • San Jose, California

- Date: Thursday, November 25, 2021
- Game time: 12:00 p.m. PST
- Game weather: Sunny • Temperature: 65 °F (18 °C) • Wind: NW 2 mph
- TV announcers (FS1): Alex Faust (play-by-play), Petros Papadakis (analyst)

Game information

First quarter

- (9:52) SJSU – Matt Mercurio 31-yard field goal (Drive: 14 plays, 47 yards, 5:14; San Jose State 3–0)
- (4:04) FRES – Jalen Cropper 4-yard run (Cesar Silva kick) (Drive: 10 plays, 75 yards, 5:42; Fresno State 7–3)

Second quarter

- (10:39) FRES – Nick Starkel intentional grounding in end zone for a safety (Fresno State 9–3)
- (8:36) SJSU – Matt Mercurio 26-yard field goal (Drive: 5 plays, 45 yards, 1:51; Fresno State 9–6)
- (5:09) FRES – Juan Rodriguez 6-yard pass from Jake Haener (Cesar Silva kick) (Drive: 9 plays, 71 yards, 3:42; Fresno State 16–6)
- (1:32) FRES – Jordan Mims 55-yard pass from Jake Haener (Cesar Silva kick) (Drive: 2 plays, 58 yards, 0:23; Fresno State 23–6)
- (0:00) SJSU – Matt Mercurio 36-yard field goal (Drive: 7 plays, 46 yards, 1:10; Fresno State 23–9)

Third quarter

- (11:19) FRES – Cesar Silva 41-yard field goal (Drive: 9 plays, 44 yards, 4:59; Fresno State 26–9)
- (5:14) FRES – Jalen Cropper 29-yard pass from Jake Haener (Cesar Silva kick) (Drive: 6 plays, 77 yards, 2:36; Fresno State 33–9)

Fourth quarter

- (12:22) FRES – Ronnie Rivers 13-yard pass from Jake Haener (Cesar Silva kick) (Drive: 4 plays, 66 yards, 1:03; Fresno State 40–9)

Statistics	FRES	SJSU
First downs	27	20
Plays–yards	72–486	69–320
Rushes–yards	34–138	26–60
Passing yards	348	260
Passing: comp–att–int	28–37–0	19–43–0
Time of possession	34:44	25:16

Team	Category	Player	Statistics
Fresno State	Passing	Jake Haener	27/36, 343 yards, 4 TD
Fresno State	Rushing	Ronnie Rivers	14 carries, 65 yards
Fresno State	Receiving	Ronnie Rivers	5 receptions, 91 yards, TD
San Jose State	Passing	Nick Starkel	19/42, 260 yards
San Jose State	Rushing	Tyler Nevens	12 carries, 45 yards
San Jose State	Receiving	Malikhi Miller	4 receptions, 78 yards

=== Vs. UTEP (New Mexico Bowl) ===
Game Thirteen – UTEP Miners (7–5) vs. Fresno State Bulldogs (9–3)

Quarter	1	2	3	4	Total
Miners	7	10	0	7	24
Bulldogs	9	10	7	5	31

at University Stadium • Albuquerque, New Mexico

- Date: Saturday, December 18, 2021
- Game time: 11:15 a.m. PST
- Game weather: Sunny • Temperature: 40 °F (4 °C) • Wind: NW 2 mph
- TV announcers (ESPN): John Schriffen (play-by-play), Rene Ingoglia (color), Stormy Buonantony (sideline)

Game information

First quarter

- (12:44) FRES – Jordan Mims 2-yard run, kick failed (Drive: 5 plays, 75 yards, 2:16; Fresno State 6–0)
- (9:03) UTEP – Trent Thompason 1-yard pass from Gavin Hardison, Gavin Baechle kick (Drive: 7 plays, 80 yards, 3:41; UTEP 7–6)
- (1:31) FRES – Cesar Silva 42-yard field goal (Drive: 11 plays, 52 yards, 5:06; Fresno State 9–7)

Second quarter

- (14:49) UTEP – Gavin Baechle 38-yard field goal (Drive: 6 plays, 54 yards, 1:42; UTEP 10–9)
- (6:54) UTEP – Ronald Awatt 1-yard run, Gavin Baechle kick (Drive: 10 plays, 70 yards, 4:01; UTEP 17–9)
- (1:52) FRES – Jordan Mims 1-yard run, Cesar Silva kick (Drive: 10 plays, 75 yards, 5:02; UTEP 17–16)
- (0:04) FRES – Cesar Silva 45-yard field goal (Drive: 7 plays, 43 yards, 0:38; Fresno State 19–17)

Third quarter

- (1:17) FRES – Jordan Mims 22-yard pass from Jake Haener, Cesar Silva kick (Drive: 8 plays, 85 yards, 3:50; Fresno State 26–17)

Fourth quarter

- (14:10) UTEP – Trent Thompson 51-yard pass from Calvin Brownholtz, Gavin Baechle kick (Drive: 5 plays, 75 yards, 2:07; Fresno State 26–24)
- (9:04) FRES – Cesar Silva 21-yard field goal (Drive: 13 plays, 71 yards, 5:06; Fresno State 29–24)
- (7:05) FRES – UTEP QB Gavin Hardison, sacked in end zone fumbles and recovered by UTEP OL Elijah Klein in end zone for a safety (Fresno State 31–24)

Statistics	UTEP	FRES
First downs	16	26
Plays–yards	56–391	76–467
Rushes–yards	29–88	35–181
Passing yards	303	286
Passing: comp–att–int	13–27–1	26–41–0
Time of possession	25:17	34:43

Team	Category	Player	Statistics
UTEP	Passing	Gavin Hardison	12/27, 252 yards, TD, INT
UTEP	Rushing	Ronald Awatt	14 carries, 40 yards, TD
UTEP	Receiving	Tyrin Smith	3 receptions, 61 yards
Fresno State	Passing	Jake Haener	26/41, 286 yards, TD
Fresno State	Rushing	Jordan Mims	29 carries, 165 yards, 2 TD
Fresno State	Receiving	Jalen Cropper	9 receptions, 72 yards
