= 2007 college football season =

The 2007 college football season may refer to:

- 2007 NCAA Division I FBS football season
- 2007 NCAA Division I FCS football season
- 2007 NCAA Division II football season
- 2007 NCAA Division III football season
- 2007 NAIA Football National Championship
