= 2007 Carroll Fighting Saints football team =

American college football season

2007 Carroll Fighting Saints football

NAIA national champion Frontier champion

NAIA National Championship Game, W 17–9 vs. Sioux Falls
- Conference: Frontier Conference
- Record: 15–0 (10–0 Frontier)
- Head coach: Mike Van Diest (9th season)

2007 Frontier Conference football standings
	Conf.			Overall
Team	W		L	W		L
No. 1 Carroll (MT) $^	10	–	0	15	–	0
No. 23 Montana Tech	6	–	4	7	–	4
Montana State–Northern	5	–	5	6	–	5
Montana Western	5	–	5	5	–	6
Rocky Mountain	3	–	7	4	–	7
Eastern Oregon	1	–	9	1	–	10
$ – Conference champion; ^ – NAIA playoff participant; Rankings from NAIA Coaches' Poll

The 2007 Carroll Fighting Saints football team was an American football team that represented Carroll College as a member of the Frontier Conference during the 2007 NAIA football season. In their ninth season under head coach Mike Van Diest, the Saints compiled a perfect 15–0 record (10–0 against conference opponents) and won the NAIA national championship, defeating Sioux Falls, 17–9, in the NAIA National Championship Game.

== Schedule ==
Date	Opponent	Site	Result	Attendance	Source
September 1	Black Hills State*	Nelson Stadium; Helena, MT	W 17–0		
September 8	at Rocky Mountain	Community Stadium; Billings, MT	W 35–3		
September 15	Eastern Oregon	Nelson Stadium; Helena, MT	W 38–3		
September 22	at MSU Northern	Tilleman Field; Havre, MT	W 10–3		
September 29	Montana Western	Nelson Stadium; Helena, MT	W 42–0		
October 6	at Montana Tech	Alumni Coliseum; Butte, MT	W 17–0		
October 13	Rocky Mountain	Nelson Stadium; Helena, MT	W 42–0		
October 20	at Eastern Oregon	Community Stadium; La Grande, OR	W 28–7		
October 27	MSU Northern	Nelson Stadium; Helena, MT	W 10–3		
November 3	at Montana Western	Bulldog Stadium; Dillon, MT	W 30–16		
November 10	Montana Tech	Nelson Stadium; Helena, MT	W 17–14		
November 17	Black Hills State*	Nelson Stadium; Helena, MT (NAIA first round)	W 34–0		
November 24	Morningside*	Nelson Stadium; Helena, MT (NAIA quarterfinal)	W 27–16	3,317	
December 1	Saint Francis (IN)*	Nelson Stadium; Helena, MT (NAIA semifinal)	W 23–7	4,527	
December 15	vs. Sioux Falls*	Jim Carroll Stadium; Savannah, TN (NAIA Championship Game)	W 17–9		
*Non-conference game
