= Walter Currie =

Walter Currie or Curry may refer to:

- Mordaunt Currie (Walter Mordaunt Cyril Currie), poet
- Sir Walter Currie, 4th Baronet, of the Currie baronets
- Walter Currie (footballer), Scottish footballer
- Walter Currie (educator), Canadian educator and public advocate
- Walter Curry (gridiron football), gridiron football defensive tackle
- Walt Currie, American college football coach
- Walter Clyde Curry (1887–1967), American academic, medievalist and poet

== See also ==
- James Walter Curry, Ontario barrister and political figure
- Currie (surname)
