= Kyle Samson =

American football coach (born c. 1984)

Current position
- Title: Head coach
- Team: Montana Tech
- Conference: Frontier
- Record: 50–17

Biographical details
- Born: c. 1984 (age 41–42); Helena, Montana, U.S.
- Education: Montana State University–Northern (2007)

Playing career
- 2003: Montana
- 2004–2006: Montana State–Northern
- Position: Quarterback

Coaching career (HC unless noted)
- 2007–2013: Montana State–Northern (OC/QB)
- 2014–2018: Flathead HS (MT)
- 2019: Montana Tech (OC/QB)
- 2020–present: Montana Tech

Head coaching record
- Overall: 50–17 (college); 28–27 (high school)
- Tournaments: 1–3 (NAIA); 2–3 (MHSA)

Accomplishments and honors

Championships
- 2 Frontier East Division (2025–2026)

Awards
- 2x Frontier East Division Coach of the Year (2025–2026); Frontier Conference Most Valuable Player (2006); 2× NAIA All-American (2005–2006); 3× All-Frontier Conference (2004–2006); Montana State–Northern Hall of Fame (2021)

Kyle Samson (born c. 1984) is an American college football coach. He is the head football coach for Montana Technological University, a position he has held since 2020. He was the head football coach for Flathead High School from 2014 to 2018. He also coached for Montana State–Northern. He played college football for Montana and Montana State–Northern as a quarterback.

In 2021, Samson was inducted into the Montana State–Northern Hall of Fame.

== Personal life ==
Samson's father, Mark, was the head football coach for Montana State University–Northern from 2004 to 2013.

== Head coaching record ==
=== College ===
| Year | Team | Overall | Conference | Standing | Bowl/playoffs | NAIA Coaches'^{#} |
|---|---|---|---|---|---|---|
Montana Tech Orediggers (Frontier Conference) (2020–present)
| 2020–21 | No team—COVID-19 | | | | | |
| 2021 | Montana Tech | 5–5 | 5–5 | 5th | | |
| 2022 | Montana Tech | 7–3 | 7–3 | T–3rd | | 24 |
| 2023 | Montana Tech | 7–4 | 6–2 | T–2nd | L NAIA First Round | 17 |
| 2024 | Montana Tech | 9–3 | 6–2 | T–2nd | L NAIA Second Round | 10 |
| 2025 | Montana Tech | 12–1 | 6–0 | 1st (East) | L NAIA Quarterfinal | 5 |
| 2026 | Montana Tech | 10–1 | 6–0 | 1st (East) | | |
| Montana Tech: | | 50–17 | 36–12 | | | |
| Total: | | 50–17 | | | | |
National championship Conference title Conference division title or championship game berth

=== High school ===
| Year | Team | Overall | Conference | Standing | Bowl/playoffs |
|---|---|---|---|---|---|
Flathead Braves (MHSA Class AA) (2014–2018)
| 2014 | Flathead | 3–7 | 3–7 | 11th | |
| 2015 | Flathead | 7–5 | 7–4 | 6th | L MHSA Class AA Quarterfinals |
| 2016 | Flathead | 3–7 | 3–7 | 10th | |
| 2017 | Flathead | 6–4 | 6–3 | 3rd | L MHSA Class AA Quarterfinals |
| 2018 | Flathead | 9–4 | 7–3 | 4th | L MHSA Class AA Championship |
| Flathead: | | 28–27 | 26–24 | | |
| Total: | | 28–27 | | | |
