= Andrew Sopko =

American baseball player (born 1994)

- Pitcher
- Born: August 7, 1994 (age 31); Missoula, Montana, U.S.
- Bats: Right Throws: Right
- Stats at Baseball Reference

Andrew Philip Sopko (born August 7, 1994) is an American former professional baseball pitcher.

== Amateur career ==
Sopko attended Loyola Sacred Heart High School in Missoula, Montana. He played basketball at Loyola Sacred Heart, but Montana does not have high school baseball, so he played American Legion Baseball for the Missoula Mavericks. Sopko committed to attend Gonzaga University to play college baseball for the Gonzaga Bulldogs. The San Diego Padres selected him in the 14th round, with the 435th overall selection, of the 2012 Major League Baseball draft. He opted not to sign, and enrolled at Gonzaga. In 2014, he played collegiate summer baseball with the Bourne Braves of the Cape Cod Baseball League.

== Professional career ==
=== Los Angeles Dodgers ===
The Los Angeles Dodgers selected him in the seventh round, with the 222nd overall selection, of the 2015 Major League Baseball draft. He signed with the Dodgers for a $147,500 signing bonus and made his professional debut with the Ogden Raptors of the Rookie-level Pioneer League in July 2015. After making six starts for Ogden, the Dodgers promoted him to the Great Lakes Loons of the Single-A Midwest League. In 2016, Sopko started the season with Great Lakes and was promoted to the Rancho Cucamonga Quakes of the High-A California League in April. He pitched for the Tulsa Drillers of the Double-A Texas League in 2017, In 2018, Sopko started the season with Rancho Cucamonga and was promoted back to Tulsa in June.

=== Toronto Blue Jays ===
On January 11, 2019, the Dodgers traded Sopko and Ronny Brito to the Toronto Blue Jays in exchange for Russell Martin. He split the year between the rookie-level Gulf Coast League Blue Jays, Double-A New Hampshire Fisher Cats, and Triple-A Buffalo Bisons, posting a cumulative 3-8 record and 5.06 ERA with 71 strikeouts in 96 innings pitched across 21 appearances (20 starts).

Sopko did not play in a game in 2020 due to the cancellation of the minor league season because of the COVID-19 pandemic. Sopko was released by the Blue Jays organization on November 20, 2020.

== Personal life ==
Sopko's father, Paul, moved to Missoula from Cleveland. Andrew grew up as a fan of the Cleveland Indians. His older brother, Sam, played college baseball at Willamette University.
