= 2021 New Mexico Bowl =

Postseason college football bowl game

2021 PUBG Mobile New Mexico Bowl
- 16th New Mexico Bowl
UTEP Miners	Fresno State Bulldogs
(7–5)	(9–3)
C–USA	MWC
24	31
Head coach: Dana Dimel	Head coach: Lee Marks (interim)
	1	2	3	4	Total
UTEP	7	10	0	7	24
Fresno State	9	10	7	5	31
- Date: December 18, 2021
- Season: 2021
- Stadium: University Stadium
- Location: Albuquerque, New Mexico
- MVP: Offense: Jordan Mims (RB, Fresno State); Defense: Elijah Gates (DB, Fresno State)
- Favorite: Fresno State by 11
- Referee: David Siegle (MAC)
- Attendance: 16,422

United States TV coverage
- Network: ESPN; ESPN Radio
- Announcers: ESPN: John Schriffen (play-by-play), Rene Ingoglia (analyst), and Stormy Buonantony (sideline); ESPN Radio: Mike Corey (play-by-play) and Hutson Mason (analyst)

International TV coverage
- Network: ESPN Brazil
- Announcers: Matheus Pinheiro (play-by-play) and Weinny Eirado (analyst)

The 2021 New Mexico Bowl was a college football bowl game played on December 18, 2021, with kickoff at 2:15 p.m. EST (12:15 p.m. local MST) on ESPN. It was the 16th edition of the New Mexico Bowl, and was one of the 2021–22 bowl games concluding the 2021 FBS football season. Due to sponsorship from video game PlayerUnknown's Battlegrounds Mobile, the game was branded as the 2021 PUBG Mobile New Mexico Bowl.

== Teams ==
Consistent with conference tie-ins, the game will be played between teams from the Conference USA (C-USA) and Mountain West Conference (MWC). The bowl also has a tie-in with the American Athletic Conference (AAC).

This will be the thirteenth meeting between UTEP and Fresno State; the Bulldogs lead the all-time series 8-3-1. From 1992 until 2004, both teams were together as members of the Western Athletic Conference.

=== UTEP Miners ===
The Miner started out their season at 2-0, after beating both New Mexico State and Bethune–Cookman (FCS). The program suffered its first loss against Boise State. Following the loss they won 4 games in a row against with a record of 6-1, New Mexico, Old Dominion, Southern Miss, and Louisiana Tech. After the 4 game winning streak, they followed up 3 straight losses to Florida Atlantic, UTSA and North Texas. The Miners ended their 4 game losing streak with a win over Rice. To end their season UTEP lost to UAB for a final record of 7-5.

== Game summary ==
2021 PUBG Mobile New Mexico Bowl

Quarter	1	2	3	4	Total
UTEP	7	10	0	7	24
Fresno State	9	10	7	5	31

at Dreamstyle Stadium • Albuquerque, New Mexico

- Date: Saturday, December 18, 2021
- Game time: 2:15 p.m. EST (12:15 p.m. local MST)
- Game weather: Sunny • Temperature: 40 °F (4 °C) • Wind: S 6 mph
- Game attendance: 16,422
- Referee: David Siegle
- TV announcers (ESPN): John Schriffen (play-by-play), Rene Ingoglia (analyst), and Stormy Buonantony (sideline)
- Box score

Scoring summary

Quarter	Time	Drive			Team	Scoring information	Score	
Quarter	Time	Plays	Yards	TOP	Team	Scoring information	UTEP	FRES
1	12:44	5	75	2:16	Fresno State	Jordan Mims 2-yard touchdown run, Cesar Silva kick failed	0	6
1	9:03	7	80	3:36	UTEP	Trent Thompson 1-yard touchdown reception from Gavin Hardison, Gavin Baechle kick good	7	6
1	1:31	11	52	5:06	Fresno State	42-yard field goal by Cesar Silva	7	9
2	14:49	6	54	1:42	UTEP	38-yard field goal by Gavin Baechle	10	9
2	6:54	10	70	4:01	UTEP	Ronald Awatt 1-yard touchdown run, Gavin Baechle kick good	17	9
2	1:52	10	75	5:02	Fresno State	Jordan Mims 1-yard touchdown run, Cesar Silva kick good	17	16
2	0:04	7	43	0:38	Fresno State	45-yard field goal by Cesar Silva	17	19
3	1:17	8	85	3:50	Fresno State	Jordan Mims 22-yard touchdown reception from Jake Haener, Cesar Silva kick good	17	26
4	14:10	5	75	2:07	UTEP	Trent Thompson 51-yard touchdown reception from Calvin Brownholtz, Gavin Baechle kick good	24	26
4	9:04	13	71	5:06	Fresno State	21-yard field goal by Cesar Silva	24	29
4	7:05				Fresno State	UTEP fumble recovered in own end zone for a safety	24	31
"TOP" = time of possession. For other American football terms, see Glossary of American football.							24	31

=== Statistics ===
Statistics	UTEP	FRES
First downs	16	25
Plays–yards	57–398	76–467
Rushes–yards	28–95	35–181
Passing yards	303	286
Passing: comp–att–int	13–29–1	26–41–0
Time of possession	25:17	34:43

Team	Category	Player	Statistics
UTEP	Passing	Gavin Hardison	12/27, 252 yards, 1 TD, 1 INT
UTEP	Rushing	Ronald Awatt	14 carries, 40 yards, 1 TD
UTEP	Receiving	Tyrin Smith	3 receptions, 61 yards
Fresno State	Passing	Jake Haener	26/41, 286 yards, 1 TD
Fresno State	Rushing	Jordan Mims	29 carries, 165 yards, 2 TD
Fresno State	Receiving	Jalen Cropper	9 receptions, 72 yards
