= Andrew Rolin =

American football coach (born 1987)

Biographical details
- Born: January 15, 1987 (age 39); Bakersfield, California, U.S.
- Education: University of San Diego (2009)

Playing career
- 2005–2008: San Diego
- Position: Quarterback

Coaching career (HC unless noted)
- 2009–2011: San Diego (RB)
- 2012: Washington (GA)
- 2013–2015: San Jose State (RB)
- 2016: San Jose State (WR/RC)
- 2017: Libby HS (MT) (OC)
- 2018–2021: Montana State–Northern

Head coaching record
- Overall: 3–34

Andrew Rolin (born January 15, 1987) is an American former college football coach. He was the head football coach for Montana State University–Northern from 2018 to 2021. He also coached for San Diego, Washington, San Jose State, and Libby High School. He played college football for San Diego as a quarterback.

== Head coaching record ==
Year	Team	Overall	Conference	Standing	Bowl/playoffs
Montana State–Northern Lights (Frontier Conference) (2018–2021)
2018	Montana State–Northern	1–10	0–10	8th	
2019	Montana State–Northern	1–10	0–10	8th	
2020–21	Montana State–Northern	0–4	0–4	5th	
2021	Montana State–Northern	1–10	1–9	8th	
Montana State–Northern:		3–34	1–33		
Total:		3–34			
