= Lee Marks =

American football coach and player

Current position
- Title: Running backs coach
- Team: Oregon State
- Conference: Pac-12

Biographical details
- Born: Reseda, California, U.S.

Playing career
- 2001–2005: Boise State
- 2006: Boise Burn
- Position: Running back

Coaching career (HC unless noted)
- 2007–2009: Colorado (assistant S&C)
- 2010–2011: Sioux Falls (GA)
- 2012: South Dakota State (RB)
- 2013: Arkansas State (assistant S&C)
- 2014: Boise State (assistant S&C)
- 2015–2018: Boise State (RB)
- 2019: Boise State (ST/RB)
- 2020–2021: Fresno State (AHC/RB/RGC)
- 2021: Fresno State (interim HC)
- 2022–2023: Washington (AHC/RB)
- 2024–2025: Memphis (RB)
- 2026–present: Oregon State (RB)

Head coaching record
- Overall: 1–0
- Bowls: 1–0

Accomplishments and honors

Awards
- 2x All-WAC selection

Lee Marks is an American college football coach. He is the running backs coach for Oregon State University, a position he has held since January 2026. He was the interim head football coach at Fresno State in 2021. He previously played running back for Boise State and in the Arena Football League (AFL).

== Playing career ==
Marks played college football as a running back at Boise State University. He accumulated 1,773 rushing yards and eight touchdowns over his final two seasons as a starter where he was named an All-Western Athletic Conference (WAC) selection both years. Following his graduation he spent a year in the Arena Football League with the Boise Burn.

== Coaching career ==
=== Early coaching career ===
Marks began his career in coaching at Colorado where he worked as an assistant speed and strength and conditioning coach from 2007 until 2009. He spent the next two seasons as a graduate assistant at the University of Sioux Falls. In 2012 he worked as the running backs coach at South Dakota State. In 2013 he went to Arkansas State where he worked as the assistant director of strength and conditioning under head coach Bryan Harsin.

=== Boise State ===
In 2014 Marks followed Harsin to his alma mater serving as an assistant strength coach. In 2015 he was made the team's running backs coach a position he held until 2019. In 2019 he was given the additional title of director of special teams.

=== Fresno State ===
In 2020 Marks went to Fresno State where he was made the team's running backs coach, assistant head coach, and run game coordinator. After it was announced that Kalen DeBoer would leave for Washington, Marks was named the team's interim head coach to coach the New Mexico Bowl.

=== Washington ===
After Marks won the New Mexico Bowl, it was announced he would be following Kalen DeBoer to Washington and become the team's running backs coach.

=== Memphis ===
In 2024 Marks went to Memphis to become the team’s running backs coach.

== Head coaching record ==
Year	Team	Overall	Conference	Standing	Bowl/playoffs
Fresno State Bulldogs (Mountain West Conference) (2021)
2021	Fresno State	1–0 (Note: Kalen DeBoer was Fresno State's head coach for the regular season, before resigning. He led Bulldogs to a conference mark of 6–2 and a second place finish in the West Division of the Mountain West Conference. Marks served as interim head coach for the New Mexico Bowl. The Bulldogs compiled an overall record of 10–3 on the season.)			W New Mexico
Fresno State:		1–0	0–0		
Total:		1–0			
