= Loyola Sacred Heart High School =

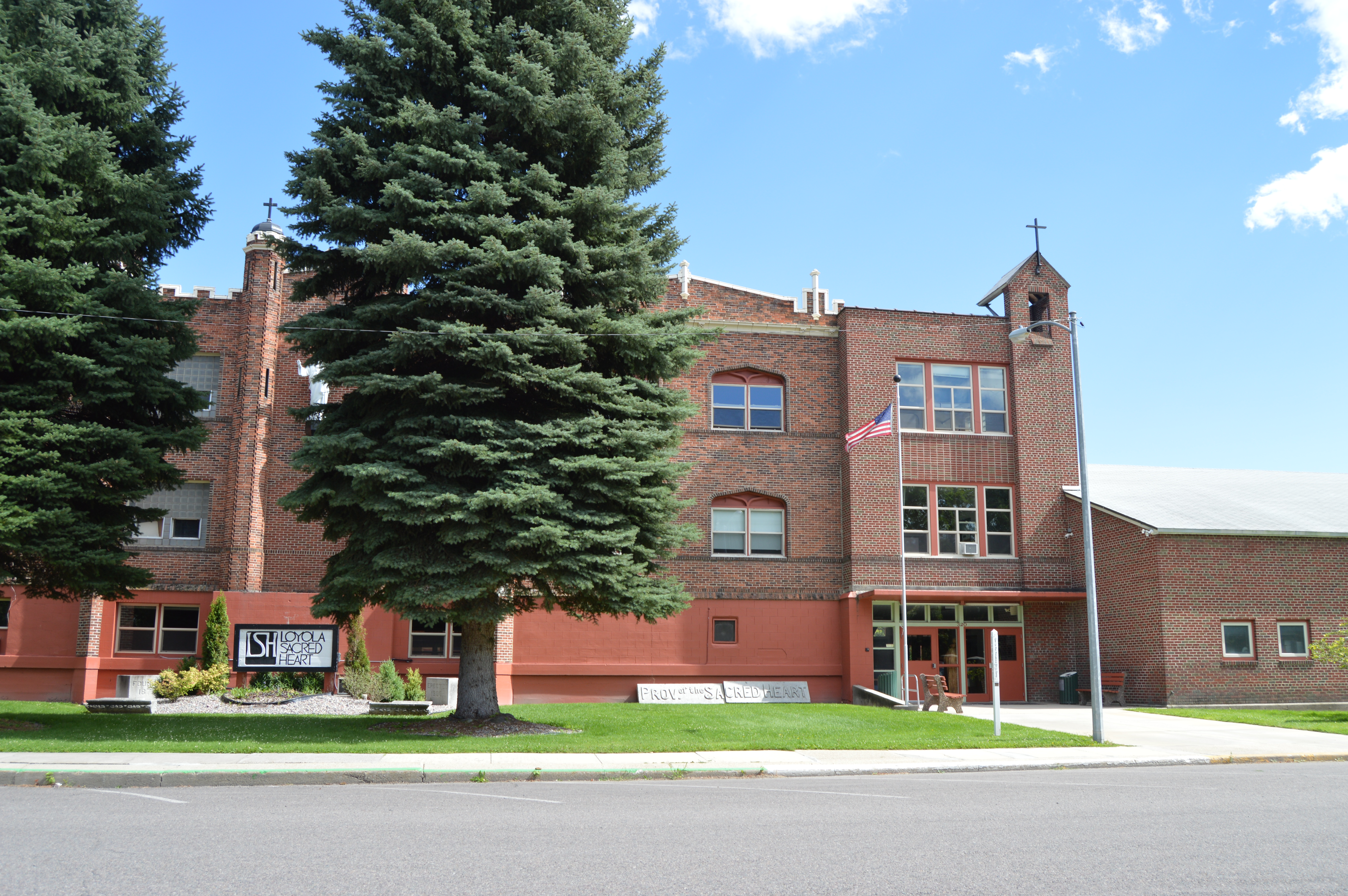

Location
- 320 Edith Street; Missoula, (Missoula County), Montana 59801; United States
- 46°51′44″N 114°0′8″W

Information
- Type: Private, Coeducational
- Religious affiliations: Roman Catholic, Jesuit
- Established: 1873
- School district: Diocese of Helena
- Superintendent: Paul Richardson
- School number: (406) 549-6101
- Principal: Paul Richardson
- Teaching staff: 20
- Grades: 9–12
- Enrollment: 180 (2024-2025)
- Student to teacher ratio: 10:1
- Campus type: Urban
- Colors: Blue, Red, and White
- Slogan: From God . . . Through the Family . . . to the Individual
- Fight song: "On Loyola"
- Athletics conference: Class B; District 6
- Mascot: "Rambo"
- Team name: Rams/Breakers
- Accreditation: Northwest Accreditation Commission
- Newspaper: The Rampage
- Tuition: Sliding Scale
- Feeder schools: St. Joseph School
- Affiliation: Roman Catholic Diocese of Helena
- Website: https://missoulacatholicschools.org

Loyola Sacred Heart High School is a private, Roman Catholic high school in Missoula, Montana. It is one of two high schools in the Roman Catholic Diocese of Helena, the other being Butte Central Catholic in Butte. It is affiliated with St. Joseph Elementary School, and both institutions are supported by the Loyola Sacred Heart Foundation. The Boys and Girls sports teams go by different names, being the Rams and the Breakers, respectively.

== History ==
Loyola Sacred Heart. It originally existed as two separated schools: Loyola High School (1912), a boys-only institution founded by the Jesuits; and Sacred Heart Academy for Girls, founded by the Sisters of Providence in (1873).

In 1974 the two schools merged into a new school, ultimately called Loyola Sacred Heart High School. The first principal of the co-ed school was Orlando R. Barone of Philadelphia, Pennsylvania, who served for six years.

== Montana High School Association State Championships ==
- Boys Football - 2012, 2013
- Boys Basketball - 2023, 2024, 2025
- Boys Tennis - 2013, 2014, 2015
- Boys Golf - 2009, 2010, 2011, 2012, 2013
- Boys Cross Country - 1999, 2000, 2001, 2002, 2003, 2004, 2006, 2010
- Boys Track and Field - 1960, 1961, 2005
- Girls Golf - 2011, 2015
- Girls Cross Country - 1997, 2003, 2004, 2012
- Girls Softball - 2003
- Girls Track and Field - 2005, 2012, 2023
- Girls Volleyball - 2005
- Girls Basketball - 2006, 2020
- Speech and Debate - 1982-2018, 2022, 2023, 2024, 2025 The school's previous 35 year winning streak is the longest-running high school state championship streak in the nation.

== Notable alumni ==
- Andrew Sopko, baseball player
