= 2007 NAIA football season =

American college football season

- National Championship: Jim Carroll Stadium; Savannah, TN; December 15, 2007
- Champion: Carroll (MT)
- Player of the Year: Chad Cavender (quarterback, Sioux Falls)

The 2007 NAIA football season was the component of the 2007 college football season organized by the National Association of Intercollegiate Athletics (NAIA) in the United States. The season's playoffs, known as the NAIA Football National Championship, culminated with the championship game on December 15, at Jim Carroll Stadium in Savannah, Tennessee. The Carroll Fighting Saints defeated the Sioux Falls Cougars, 17–9, in the title game to win the program's fifth NAIA championship.

== Conference standings ==
2007 Central States Football League standings
	Conf.			Overall
Team	W		L	W		L
No. 18 NW Oklahoma State $^	4	–	0	8	–	4
Langston	3	–	1	5	–	4
Southern Nazarene	2	–	2	6	–	4
Bacone	1	–	3	4	–	7
Texas College	0	–	4	3	–	7
$ – Conference champion; ^ – NAIA playoff participant; Rankings from NAIA Coaches' Poll

2007 Dakota Athletic Conference football standings
	Conf.			Overall
Team	W		L	W		L
No. 11 Jamestown +^	6	–	1	9	–	2
No. 20 Black Hills State +^	6	–	1	7	–	4
Minot State +	6	–	1	6	–	4
Valley City State	3	–	4	4	–	6
Dickinson State	3	–	4	3	–	7
Dakota State	2	–	5	3	–	6
South Dakota Mines	1	–	6	3	–	7
Mayville State	1	–	6	2	–	8
+ – Conference co-champions; ^ – NAIA playoff participant; Rankings from NAIA Coaches' Poll

2007 Frontier Conference football standings
	Conf.			Overall
Team	W		L	W		L
No. 1 Carroll (MT) $^	10	–	0	15	–	0
No. 23 Montana Tech	6	–	4	7	–	4
Montana State–Northern	5	–	5	6	–	5
Montana Western	5	–	5	5	–	6
Rocky Mountain	3	–	7	4	–	7
Eastern Oregon	1	–	9	1	–	10
$ – Conference champion; ^ – NAIA playoff participant; Rankings from NAIA Coaches' Poll

2007 Great Plains Athletic Conference football standings
	Conf.			Overall
Team	W		L	W		L
No. 2 Sioux Falls $^	10	–	0	13	–	1
No. 15 Northwestern (IA)	8	–	2	8	–	2
No. 7 Morningside ^	8	–	2	9	–	3
No. 22 Nebraska Wesleyan	7	–	3	7	–	3
Hastings	5	–	5	6	–	5
Concordia (NE)	4	–	6	4	–	6
Dakota Wesleyan	4	–	6	4	–	6
Doane	4	–	6	4	–	6
Dana	3	–	7	4	–	7
Midland Lutheran	2	–	8	2	–	8
Briar Cliff	0	–	10	0	–	11
$ – Conference champion; ^ – NAIA playoff participant; Rankings from NAIA Coaches' Poll

2007 Heart of America Athletic Conference football standings
	Conf.			Overall
Team	W		L	W		L
No. 9 Lindenwood $^	9	–	1	10	–	2
No. 3 Missouri Valley ^	8	–	2	10	–	3
No. 13 MidAmerica Nazarene ^	8	–	2	9	–	3
Graceland	6	–	4	6	–	4
William Jewell	6	–	4	6	–	4
Baker	6	–	4	6	–	5
Evangel	5	–	5	6	–	5
Benedictine (KS)	3	–	7	4	–	7
Central Methodist	2	–	8	2	–	8
Avila	1	–	9	2	–	9
Culver–Stockton	1	–	9	1	–	10
$ – Conference champion; ^ – NAIA playoff participant; Rankings from NAIA Coaches' Poll

2007 Kansas Collegiate Athletic Conference football standings
	Conf.			Overall
Team	W		L	W		L
No. 17 Bethel (KS) +	8	–	1	8	–	1
No. 12 Friends +^	8	–	1	9	–	2
No. 19 Sterling	7	–	2	8	–	2
Bethany (KS)	5	–	4	6	–	4
Kansas Wesleyan	4	–	5	5	–	5
Southwestern (KS)	4	–	5	4	–	6
McPherson	3	–	6	4	–	6
Ottawa	3	–	6	4	–	6
Saint Mary (KS)	3	–	6	3	–	6
Tabor	0	–	9	1	–	9
+ – Conference co-champions; ^ – NAIA playoff participant; Rankings from NAIA Coaches' Poll

2007 Mid-South Conference football standings
	Conf.			Overall
Team	W		L	W		L
East Division
No. 14 Virginia–Wise x	4	–	1	10	–	2
No. 16 Cumberlands (KY) x^	4	–	1	8	–	3
No. 24 Georgetown (KY)	3	–	2	6	–	4
Pikeville	2	–	3	4	–	7
Union (KY)	2	–	3	4	–	7
West Virginia Tech	0	–	5	1	–	10
West Division
No. 5 Bethel (TN) x^	5	–	0	11	–	2
Shorter	3	–	2	7	–	4
Belhaven	3	–	2	5	–	6
Cumberland (TN)	2	–	3	3	–	7
Lambuth	2	–	3	3	–	8
Campbellsville	0	–	5	0	–	10
x – Division champion/co-champions; ^ – NAIA playoff participant; Rankings from NAIA Coaches' Poll

2007 Mid-States Football Association standings
	Conf.			Overall
Team	W		L	W		L
Mideast League
No. 6 Ohio Dominican x^	7	–	0	12	–	1
No. 4 Saint Francis (IN) ^	6	–	1	11	–	2
No. 8 Saint Xavier ^	5	–	2	10	–	3
No. 25 Malone	4	–	3	8	–	4
Urbana	3	–	4	6	–	5
Walsh	2	–	5	5	–	6
Marian (IN)	1	–	6	1	–	9
Taylor	0	–	7	2	–	9
Midwest League
No. 10 St. Ambrose x^	7	–	0	8	–	3
McKendree	5	–	2	6	–	4
Olivet Nazarene	5	–	2	5	–	5
Quincy	4	–	3	6	–	5
William Penn	3	–	4	5	–	6
St. Francis (IL)	3	–	4	3	–	8
Trinity International	1	–	6	2	–	9
Iowa Wesleyan	0	–	7	0	–	11
x – League champion/co-champions ^ – NAIA playoff participant; Rankings from NAIA Coaches' Poll

2007 NAIA independents football records
	Conf.			Overall
Team	W		L	W		L
Southern Oregon		–		5	–	4
No. 21 Azusa Pacific		–		6	–	5
Peru State		–		6	–	5
Edward Waters		–		5	–	6
Southern Virginia		–		4	–	5
Webber International		–		3	–	6
Haskell		–		2	–	8
Waldorf		–		2	–	9
SAGU		–		1	–	9
Faulkner		–		0	–	9
Rankings from NAIA Coaches' Poll
