= Walt Currie =

American football coach (1943–2013)

Biographical details
- Born: October 20, 1943; Missoula, Montana, U.S.
- Died: June 16, 2013 (aged 69); Great Falls, Montana, U.S.
- Education: University of Montana (1969)

Playing career

Football
- c. 1960s: Carroll (MT)

Coaching career (HC unless noted)

Football
- 1969–1976: Hermiston HS (OR) (assistant)
- 1977: Havre HS (MT) (assistant)
- 1978–1986: Havre HS (MT)
- 1987–1990: Hermiston HS (OR)
- 1991–1997: Great Falls HS (MT) (freshman)
- 1998–2003: Montana State–Northern
- 2006–?: Fort Benton HS (MT)

Wrestling
- 1969–1976: Hermiston HS (OR) (assistant)
- 1977: Havre HS (MT) (assistant)
- 1978–1986: Havre HS (MT)
- 1987–1990: Hermiston HS (OR)
- 1991–1997: Great Falls HS (MT)

Head coaching record
- Overall: 10–42 (college football); 51–35 (high school football; Havre); 52–61 (high school wrestling; Havre)

Walter Eugene Currie (October 20, 1943 – June 16, 2013) was an American college football coach. He was the head football coach for Havre High School from 1978 to 1986, Hermiston High School from 1987 to 1990, Montana State University–Northern from 1998 to 2003, and Fort Benton High School starting in 2006.

Currie resurrected the Montana State–Northern Lights football program which had not fielded a team since 1971. He was also the head wrestling coach for multiple high schools in Montana and Oregon.

Currie died on June 16, 2013, in Great Falls, Montana, as a result of an iron overload. He was inducted into the Montana State–Northern Hall of Fame in 2023.

== Head coaching record ==
=== College football ===
Year	Team	Overall	Conference	Standing	Bowl/playoffs
Montana State–Northern Lights (Frontier Conference) (1999–2003)
1999	Montana State–Northern	3–8	1–7	T–4th	
2000	Montana State–Northern	2–8	2–6	4th	
2001	Montana State–Northern	3–8	2–6	T–3rd	
2002	Montana State–Northern	1–9	1–7	5th	
2003	Montana State–Northern	1–9	1–7	5th	
Montana State–Northern:		10–42	7–33		
Total:		10–42			
