= 2007 Saint Francis Cougars football team =

American college football season

2007 Saint Francis Cougars football

NAIA Playoff Semifinalist
- Conference: Mid-States Football Association
- Mideast League
- Record: 11–2 (6–1 MSFA (MEL))
- Head coach: Kevin Donley (10th season)
- Offensive coordinator: Patrick Donley, Trevor Miller (4th, 2nd season)
- Home stadium: Bishop John M. D'Arcy Stadium

2007 Mid-States Football Association standings
| | Conf. | | | Overall |
| Team | W | | L | W | | L |
|---|---|---|---|---|---|---|
Mideast League
| No. 6 Ohio Dominican x^ | 7 | – | 0 | 12 | – | 1 |
| No. 4 Saint Francis (IN) ^ | 6 | – | 1 | 11 | – | 2 |
| No. 8 Saint Xavier ^ | 5 | – | 2 | 10 | – | 3 |
| No. 25 Malone | 4 | – | 3 | 8 | – | 4 |
| Urbana | 3 | – | 4 | 6 | – | 5 |
| Walsh | 2 | – | 5 | 5 | – | 6 |
| Marian (IN) | 1 | – | 6 | 1 | – | 9 |
| Taylor | 0 | – | 7 | 2 | – | 9 |
Midwest League
| No. 10 St. Ambrose x^ | 7 | – | 0 | 8 | – | 3 |
| McKendree | 5 | – | 2 | 6 | – | 4 |
| Olivet Nazarene | 5 | – | 2 | 5 | – | 5 |
| Quincy | 4 | – | 3 | 6 | – | 5 |
| William Penn | 3 | – | 4 | 5 | – | 6 |
| St. Francis (IL) | 3 | – | 4 | 3 | – | 8 |
| Trinity International | 1 | – | 6 | 2 | – | 9 |
| Iowa Wesleyan | 0 | – | 7 | 0 | – | 11 |
x – League champion/co-champions ^ – NAIA playoff participant; Rankings from NAIA Coaches' Poll

The 2007 Saint Francis Cougars football team represented the University of Saint Francis, located in Fort Wayne, Indiana, in the 2007 NAIA football season. They were led by head coach Kevin Donley, who served his 10th year as the first and only head coach in the history of Saint Francis football. The Cougars played their home games at Bishop John D'Arcy Stadium and were members of the Mid-States Football Association (MSFA) Mideast League (MEL). The Cougars finished in 2nd place in the MSFA MEL division, but they received an at-large bid to the 2007 postseason NAIA playoffs.

== Schedule ==
On September 29, 2007, the Saint Francis loss to Ohio Dominican snapped a 54-game regular season winning streak dating back to 2001.

| Date | Time | Opponent | Rank | Site | Result | Attendance |
|---|---|---|---|---|---|---|
| September 8 | Noon | William Penn* | No. 2 | Bishop D'Arcy Stadium; Fort Wayne, IN | W 71–7 | 3,200 |
| September 15 | 1:30pm | at Pikeville* | No. 2 | Hambley Athletic Complex; Pikeville, KY | W 55–3 | 2,500 |
| September 22 | 2:00pm | at No. 15 St. Ambrose* | No. 2 | Brady Street Stadium; Davenport, IA | W 20–7 | 1,000 |
| September 29 | 12:30pm | at No. 6 Ohio Dominican | No. 2 | Panther Field; Columbus, OH | L 20–30 | 2,153 |
| October 6 | Noon | Marian | No. 6 | Bishop D'Arcy Stadium; Fort Wayne, IN | W 57–7 | 2,700 |
| October 13 | Noon | Taylor^{†} | No. 5 | Bishop D'Arcy Stadium; Fort Wayne, IN | W 69–29 | 3,100 |
| October 20 | Noon | at Walsh | No. 5 | Fawcett Stadium; Canton, OH | W 42–14 | 2,550 |
| October 27 | Noon | No. 31 Urbana | No. 5 | Bishop D'Arcy Stadium; Fort Wayne, IN | W 42–16 | 1,750 |
| November 3 | 4:00pm | at No. 18 Malone | No. 5 | Fawcett Stadium; Canton, OH | W 31–17 | 2,468 |
| November 10 | Noon | No. 6 Saint Xavier | No. 5 | Bishop D'Arcy Stadium; Fort Wayne, IN | W 42–13 | 3,550 |
| November 17 | Noon | No. 12 Lindenwood* | No. 5 | Bishop D'Arcy Stadium; Fort Wayne, IN (NAIA First Round) | W 35–14 | 2,750 |
| November 24 | 3:30pm (FW time) | at No. 4 Bethel* | No. 5 | Walter Butler Stadium; McKenzie, TN (NAIA Quarterfinal) | W 30–27 | 3,700 |
| December 1 | 2:07pm (FW time) | at No. 2 Carroll* | No. 5 | Nelson Stadium; Helena, MT (NAIA Semifinal) | L 7–23 | 4,527 |
*Non-conference game; ^{†}Homecoming; Rankings from Coaches' Poll released prior to the game; All times are in Eastern time

== Ranking movements ==
Ranking movements Legend: ██ Increase in ranking ██ Decrease in ranking
| | Week | | | | | | | | | | | |
| Poll | Pre | 1 | 2 | 3 | 4 | 5 | 6 | 7 | 8 | 9 | 10 | Final |
|---|---|---|---|---|---|---|---|---|---|---|---|---|
| NAIA Coaches' Poll | 2 | 2 | 2 | 2 | 6 | 5 | 5 | 5 | 5 | 5 | 5 | 4 |
