= Gavin Hardison =

American football player (born 2000)

Profile
- Position: Quarterback

Personal information
- Born: May 15, 2000 (age 26); Hobbs, New Mexico, U.S.
- Listed height: 6 ft 3 in (1.91 m)
- Listed weight: 215 lb (98 kg)

Career information
- High school: Hobbs
- College: New Mexico Military (2018); UTEP (2019–2023)
- NFL draft: 2024: undrafted

Career history
- Miami Dolphins (2024)*; Hamilton Tiger-Cats (2025)*
- * Offseason or practice squad member only

Gavin Glen Hardison (born May 15, 2000) is an American professional football quarterback. He was most recently a member of the Hamilton Tiger-Cats of the Canadian Football League (CFL). He played college football for the New Mexico Military Institute Broncos and the UTEP Miners.

== Early life ==
Born in Hobbs, New Mexico, Hardison attended Hobbs High School and graduated from there in 2018. After seeing limited action at quarterback as a sophomore, he became a starter as a junior and threw for 3,276 yards and 33 touchdowns.

Hardison had his best year as a senior, leading Hobbs to a 9–3 record and reaching the state quarterfinals while throwing for a New Mexico state record 5,357 passing yards on 332 completions, additionally setting the school record with 59 passing touchdowns on his way to being named NMPreps.com New Mexico Quarterback of the Year and the state's Mr. Football. He committed to play college football for the New Mexico Military Institute Broncos.

== College career ==
As a true freshman at New Mexico Military Institute, Hardison appeared in five games and totaled 408 passing yards, four touchdowns and four interceptions while completing 38-of-67 attempts. He transferred to play for the UTEP Miners after one season at New Mexico Military Institute.

In his first year at UTEP, Hardison appeared in two games and completed 27-of-61 pass attempts for 335 yards, having a long of 36 and one touchdown pass with no interceptions thrown. The following season, he won a position battle and became the team's starting quarterback. He ended up starting all seven games in the COVID-19-shortened season, posting 1,419 passing yards, five touchdowns and five interceptions while completing 108-of-199 pass attempts.

Hardison remained a starter in 2021 and improved, starting all 13 games and being named honorable mention all-conference while having the fifth-most single season passing yards in program history; he ended the year having completed 198-of-357 passes, throwing for 3,217 yards and 18 touchdowns. In 2022, Hardison appeared in 10 games before suffering a season-ending injury, having finished with 164 pass completions on 315 attempts for 2,044 yards and 11 touchdowns along with eight interceptions.

Hardison returned as a starter for his redshirt senior season in 2023. He appeared in only five games before undergoing Tommy John surgery in November, which caused him to miss the remainder of the season.

== Professional career ==
=== Miami Dolphins ===
On April 27, 2024, Hardison signed with the Miami Dolphins as an undrafted free agent after he was not selected in the 2024 NFL draft. He was waived by the Dolphins on July 27.

=== Hamilton Tiger-Cats ===
On February 7, 2025, Hardison signed with the Hamilton Tiger-Cats of the Canadian Football League. However, he was part of the final cuts on June 1.

== Personal life ==
Hardison is the son of Chad and June Hardison. He has one brother. His father, Chad, was a retired firefighter who worked for the Hobbs Fire Department for 21 years and then spent two years at University of the Southwest as a strength coach for all teams on campus.
