= 2007 NAIA football national championship =

2007 NAIA Football Championship
	1st	2nd	3rd	4th	Total
Carroll (MT)	3	0	14	0	17
Sioux Falls (SD)	0	0	6	3	9
- Date: December 15, 2007
- Stadium: Jim Carroll Stadium
- City: Savannah, Tennessee
- MOP (Offense): Gabe Le, Carroll
- MOP (Defense): Owen Koeppen, Carroll

The 2007 NAIA football championship series concluded on December 15, 2007 with the championship game played at Jim Carroll Stadium in Savannah, Tennessee. The championship was won by the Carroll Fighting Saints over the Sioux Falls Cougars by a score of 17–9.

== Scoring Summary ==
Scoring summary

Quarter	Time	Drive			Team	Scoring information	Score	
Quarter	Time	Plays	Yards	TOP	Team	Scoring information	Carroll Fighting Saints	Sioux Falls Cougars
1	7:05	6	18	2:06	Carroll Fighting Saints	25-yard field goal by Marcus Miller	3	0
3	10:07	7	80	2:08	Sioux Falls Cougars	Ryan Lowmiller 1-yard touchdown run, Matt Lindgren kick Failed	3	6
3	7:26	5	37	2:41	Carroll Fighting Saints	Gabe Le 20-yard touchdown run, Marcus Miller kick Good	10	6
3	0:34	9	44	5:11	Carroll Fighting Saints	Gabe Le 2-yard touchdown run, Marcus Miller kick Good	17	6
4	2:37	11	39	2:26	Sioux Falls Cougars	27-yard field goal by Matt Lindgren	17	9
"TOP" = time of possession. For other American football terms, see Glossary of American football.							Carroll Fighting Saints	Sioux Falls Cougars

== Tournament bracket ==
1st Round; November 17
1	Sioux Falls (11–0)	35
15	Northwestern Oklahoma State (8–4)	7
7	Saint Ambrose (9–3)	27
10	Saint Xavier (IL) (10–2)	33
3	Ohio Dominican (12–0)	62
14	Cumberlands (KY) (8–3)	35
8	Friends (9–2)	21
9	Missouri Valley (9–2)	34
2	Carroll (MT) (12–0)	34
16	Black Hills State (7–4)	0
6	Jamestown (9–2)	14
11	Morningside (9–2)	45
4	Bethel (TN) (11–1)	55
13	MidAmerica Nazarene (9–3)	34
5	Saint Francis (IN) (10–1)	35
12	Lindenwood (10–2)	14

Quarterfinals; November 24
1	Sioux Falls	49
10	Saint Xavier (IL)	7
3	Ohio Dominican	34
9	Missouri Valley	48
2	Carroll (MT)	27
11	Morningside	16
4	Bethel (TN)	27
5	Saint Francis (IN)	30

Semifinals; December 1–2
1	Sioux Falls	11
9	Missouri Valley	10
2	Carroll (MT)	23
5	Saint Francis (IN)	7

Championship; December 15
1	Sioux Falls	9
2	Carroll (MT)	17

- * denotes OT.
