= Sioux Falls Cougars =

Sports teams of University in Sioux Falls

- University: University of Sioux Falls
- Nickname: Cougars
- NCAA: Division II
- Conference: NSIC
- Athletic director: Jon Hart
- Location: Sioux Falls, South Dakota
- Varsity teams: 18
- Football stadium: Bob Young Field
- Basketball arena: Stewart Center
- Baseball stadium: Sioux Falls Stadium- Birdcage
- Softball stadium: Sanford Softball Diamonds
- Soccer stadium: USF Soccer Field
- Other venues: Lillibridge Track
- Colors: Purple and white
- Mascot: Cooper
- Website: usfcougars.com

The Sioux Falls Cougars are the athletic teams that represent the University of Sioux Falls, located in Sioux Falls, South Dakota, in intercollegiate sports as a member of the NCAA Division II ranks, primarily competing the Northern Sun Intercollegiate Conference (NSIC) since the 2012–13 academic year. Prior to joining the NCAA, the Cougars previously competed in the Great Plains Athletic Conference (GPAC) of the National Association of Intercollegiate Athletics (NAIA) from 2000–01 to 2010–11; and in the defunct South Dakota Intercollegiate Conference (SDIC) from 1977–78 to 1999–2000.

== Move to NCAA ==
On April 28, 2009 the university board of trustees voted to leave the NAIA and apply to join the NCAA Division II. For two years, USF remained a member of the NAIA and Great Plains Athletic Conference. In 2011–2012, the school became a provisional member of the NCAA, playing full NCAA schedules and required to operate under NCAA Division II regulations but ineligible for postseason events.

In July 2012, the university became one of six universities to join the NCAA as full members, with official membership commencing on September 1, 2012. As part of the successful transition to the NCAA, the Cougars became eligible for postseason conference and NCAA postseason competition, and began conference play in the NSIC for the majority of sports and in the GNAC for men's soccer.

== Sports ==
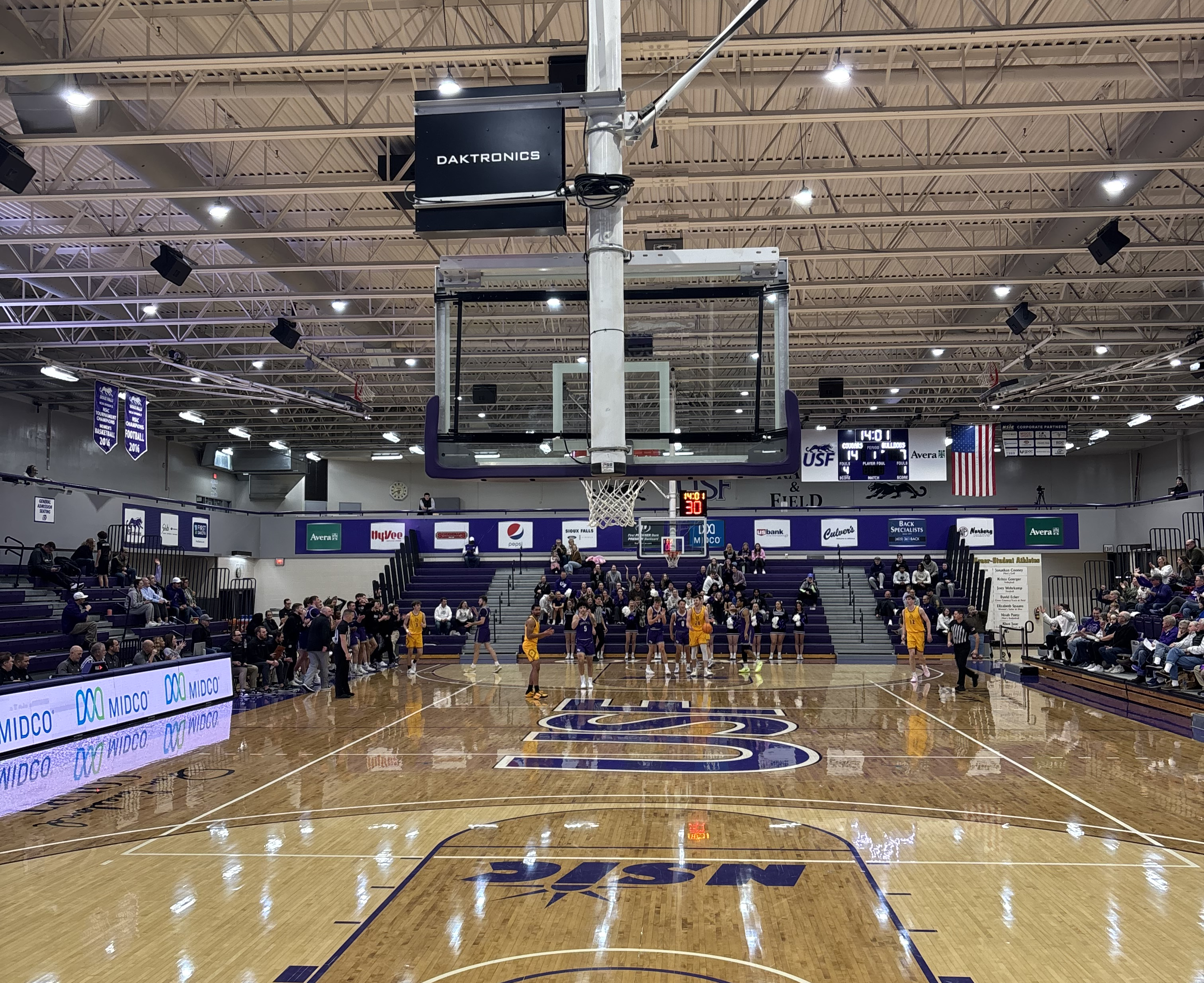
The Stewart Center is the home arena for the Sioux Falls Cougars

=== Varsity teams ===
Men's sports	Women's sports
Baseball	Basketball
Basketball	Cheerleading
Cross country	Cross country
Football	Golf
Golf	Soccer
Track and field	Softball
Wrestling	Swimming
	Tennis
	Track and field
	Wrestling
	Volleyball

Former sports included men's tennis, which was dropped once USF moved to NCAA Division II in 2011 and in the spring of 2013 USF dropped Men's Soccer after one year in DII The tennis team had made five trips to the NAIA Championships in 2003, 2004, 2007, 2008, and 2010.

== Individual programs ==
=== Baseball ===
The USF baseball team, now directed by head coach Grant Hieb, won the 2007 GPAC regular and postseason titles with a record of 17–7 (26–19 overall). They had a breakout season in the spring of 2010, setting a school record for wins in a season with a 33–17 record. The Cougars finished second in the GPAC with a 19–5 conference record. In 2012, the Cougars moved to NCAA DII and joined the NSIC.

=== Basketball (men's) ===
The men's basketball team advanced to 9 NAIA Tournaments, including a Final Four Appearance in 2004. USF won two regular season GPAC Titles (2006, 2007) and 4 postseason GPAC Titles (2004, 2007, 2009, 2011). The current coach is Chris Johnson, who has led the Cougars to tournament appearances in each of his three seasons, including Sweet Sixteen appearances in 2009 and 2010. He has 226 career wins at USF with 242 in his career with 172 losses. He is 226–157 at USF (5/5/22) and was named NSIC Coach of the Year in 2019–20.

=== Basketball (women's) ===
The women's basketball team advanced to the NAIA Tournament in 2001, 2003, and 2011. The 2003 team is the only Final Four team in school history. The 2011 team, under current coach Travis Traphagen, reached the Elite 8 and set a school record for wins with 27. He has 251 career wins and all at USF. The Cougars were ranked No. 11 in WBCA poll during the 2019-20 season for their highest ranking at the DII level. USF made an appearance in the NCAA DII Championships after claiming the 2015-16 NSIC Tournament title and earning the automatic berth to the regional.

=== Golf (women's) ===
The 2007–2008 women's golf team won the GPAC Championship. Wade Merry is the head coach for both men's and women's programs beginning in 2021.

=== Softball ===
The women's softball team, directed by head coach Shannon Pivovar, advanced to the NAIA Softball World Series in 2005. That team also won the only postseason GPAC title in school history and finished with a 29–16 record, a school record for victories.

=== Tennis (women's) ===
The women's tennis team, led by head coach Kevin Grebin, made four trips to the NAIA Championships in 2000, 2004, 2005, 2010. They won regular season GPAC titles in 2005, 2009, and 2010 and postseason GPAC titles in 2004, 2005, and 2010.

=== Track and field ===
The track and field team, which is directed by Doug Petersen, has four NAIA individual national champions:

University of Sioux Falls NAIA track and field champions
Individual	Year	Sport
Vinnie Olson	2004	Indoor Shot Put
Colin Koth	2011	Indoor 400
Brigitte Gross	2011	Indoor Pole Vault
Brigitte Gross	2011	Outdoor Pole Vault

Since joining the NCAA, the track and field program has added four more national champions:

University of Sioux Falls NCAA track and field champions
Individual	Year	Sport
Brigitte Gross	2014	Indoor Pole Vault
Jagger Gran	2015	Indoor Pole Vault
Scott Greenman	2017	Indoor Pole Vault
Courtney Crandall	2017	Indoor Pole Vault

The women's outdoor team won the GPAC title in 2011.
