= Montana State–Northern Lights football =

College football team

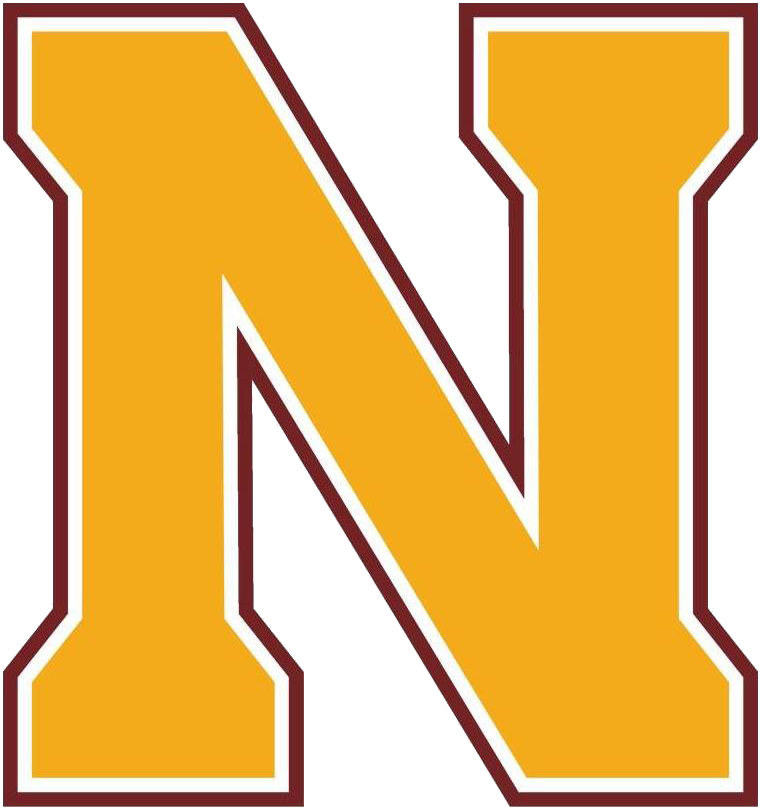
- First season: 1957; 69 years ago
- Athletic director: Christian Oberquell
- Head coach: Jerome Souers; 4th season, 3–38 (.073)
- Location: Havre, Montana
- Stadium: Tilleman Field (capacity: 2,000)
- Conference: Frontier
- Colors: Maroon and gold
- All-time record: 64–185 (.257)
- Mascot: Northern lights
- Website: golightsgo.com/football

The Montana State–Northern Lights football team represents Montana State University–Northern in college football in the National Association of Intercollegiate Athletics (NAIA). The Lights are members of the Frontier Conference, fielding its team in the Frontier Conference since 1999. The Lights play their home games at Tilleman Field in Havre, Montana.

The school's head coach is Jerome Souers, who took over the position for the 2022 season.

== Conference affiliations ==
- Frontier Conference (1999–present)

== List of head coaches ==
=== Key ===
Key to symbols in coaches list
General		Overall		Conference		Postseason (Note: Although the first Rose Bowl Game was played in 1902, it has been continuously played since the 1916 game, and is recognized as the oldest bowl game by the NCAA. "—" indicates any season prior to 1916 when postseason games were not played.)	
No.	Order of coaches (Note: A running total of the number of head coaches, with coaches who served separate tenures being counted only once. Interim head coaches are represented with "Int" and are not counted in the running total. "—" indicates the team played but either without a coach or no coach is on record. "X" indicates an interim year without play.)	GC	Games coached	CW	Conference wins	PW	Postseason wins
DC	Division championships	OW	Overall wins	CL	Conference losses	PL	Postseason losses
CC	Conference championships	OL	Overall losses	CT	Conference ties	PT	Postseason ties
NC	National championships	OT	Overall ties (Note: Overtime rules in college football were introduced in 1996, making ties impossible in the period since.)	C%	Conference winning percentage		
†	Elected to the College Football Hall of Fame	O%	Overall winning percentage (Note: When computing the win–loss percentage, a tie counts as half a win and half a loss.)				

=== Coaches since 1999 ===
List of head football coaches showing season(s) coached, overall records and conference records
No.	Name	Season(s)	GC	OW	OL	OT	O%	CW	CL	CT	C%
1	Walt Currie	1999–2003	52	10	42	0	0.192	7	33	0	0.175
2	Mark Samson	2004–2013	104	45	59	0	0.433	40	56	0	0.417
3	Jake Eldridge	2014, 2017	14	3	11	0	0.214	2	11	0	0.154
4	Aaron Christensen	2015–2017	32	2	27	0	0.069	1	26	0	0.037
5	Andrew Rolin	2018–2021	37	3	34	0	0.081	1	33	0	0.029
6	Jerome Souers	2022–present	41	3	38	0	0.068	1	31	0	0.031

== Year-by-year results since 1999 ==
National champions	Conference champions	Bowl game berth	Playoff berth

Season	Year	Head coach	Association	Division	Conference	Record							Postseason	Final ranking
Season	Year	Head coach	Association	Division	Conference	Overall			Conference				Postseason	Final ranking
Season	Year	Head coach	Association	Division	Conference	Win	Loss	Tie	Finish	Win	Loss	Tie	Postseason	Final ranking
Montana State–Northern Lights
1999	1999	Walt Currie	NAIA	—	Frontier	3	8	0	T–4th	1	7	0	—	—
2000	2000	Walt Currie	NAIA	—	Frontier	2	8	0	4th	2	6	0	—	—
2001	2001	Walt Currie	NAIA	—	Frontier	3	8	0	T–3rd	2	6	0	—	—
2002	2002	Walt Currie	NAIA	—	Frontier	1	9	0	5th	1	7	0	—	—
2003	2003	Walt Currie	NAIA	—	Frontier	1	9	0	5th	1	7	0	—	—
2004	2004	Mark Samson	NAIA	—	Frontier	1	10	0	T–4th	1	7	0	—	—
2005	2005	Mark Samson	NAIA	—	Frontier	5	5	0	3rd	3	5	0	—	—
2006	2006	Mark Samson	NAIA	—	Frontier	9	2	0	2nd	8	2	0	NAIA First Round	11
2007	2007	Mark Samson	NAIA	—	Frontier	6	5	0	T–3rd	5	5	0	—	—
2008	2008	Mark Samson	NAIA	—	Frontier	7	3	0	2nd	7	3	0	—	21
2009	2009	Mark Samson	NAIA	—	Frontier	2	9	0	T–5th	1	9	0	—	—
2010	2010	Mark Samson	NAIA	—	Frontier	3	7	0	5th	3	7	0	—	—
2011	2011	Mark Samson	NAIA	—	Frontier	5	5	0	3rd	5	5	0	—	—
2012	2012	Mark Samson	NAIA	—	Frontier	3	7	0	7th	3	7	0	—	—
2013	2013	Mark Samson	NAIA	—	Frontier	4	6	0	T–5th	4	6	0	—	—
2014	2014	Jake Eldridge	NAIA	—	Frontier	3	8	0	7th	2	8	0	—	—
2015	2015	Aaron Christensen	NAIA	—	Frontier	0	11	0	8th	0	10	0	—	—
2016	2016	Aaron Christensen	NAIA	—	Frontier	1	9	0	8th	1	9	0	—	—
2017	2017	Aaron Christensen / Jake Eldridge (interim, last 3 games)	NAIA	—	Frontier	1	10	0	8th	0	10	0	—	—
2018	2018	Andrew Rolin	NAIA	—	Frontier	1	10	0	8th	0	10	0	—	—
2019	2019	Andrew Rolin	NAIA	—	Frontier	1	10	0	8th	0	10	0	—	—
2020	2020	Andrew Rolin	NAIA	—	Frontier	0	4	0	5th	0	4	0	—	—
2021	2021	Andrew Rolin	NAIA	—	Frontier	1	10	0	8th	1	9	0	—	—
2022	2022	Jerome Souers	NAIA	—	Frontier	0	10	0	8th	0	10	0	—	—
2023	2023	Jerome Souers	NAIA	—	Frontier	1	9	0	9th	0	8	0	—	—
