= List of Northwest Conference football standings =

This is a list of yearly Northwest Conference football standings.

== Northwest Conference standings ==
=== Early history ===
1934 Northwest Conference football standings
	Conf.					Overall
Team	W		L		T	W		L		T
Willamette +	5	–	0	–	0	8	–	1	–	0
College of Idaho +	4	–	0	–	0	8	–	1	–	0
Pacific (OR)	3	–	1	–	1	4	–	2	–	3
Puget Sound	2	–	2	–	1	3	–	5	–	1
Linfield	2	–	3	–	0	5	–	3	–	0
Whitman	0	–	5	–	0	1	–	6	–	0
Albany (OR)	0	–	5	–	0	0	–	9	–	0
+ – Conference co-champions

1935 Northwest Conference football standings
	Conf.					Overall
Team	W		L		T	W		L		T
Willamette $	4	–	0	–	0	5	–	2	–	0
Linfield	3	–	0	–	1	5	–	2	–	2
Whitman	3	–	2	–	1	6	–	2	–	1
College of Idaho	2	–	3	–	0	6	–	4	–	0
Puget Sound	1	–	2	–	1	4	–	4	–	1
Pacific (OR)	1	–	3	–	2	2	–	4	–	2
Albany (OR)	0	–	4	–	1	1	–	5	–	1
$ – Conference champion

=== Modern era ===
1980 Northwest Conference football standings
	Conf.					Overall
Team	W		L		T	W		L		T
No. 3 Linfield $^	5	–	0	–	0	9	–	1	–	0
No. 1 Pacific Lutheran ^	4	–	1	–	0	11	–	1	–	0
Willamette	2	–	2	–	1	3	–	4	–	1
Whitworth	2	–	3	–	0	2	–	7	–	0
Lewis & Clark	1	–	3	–	1	4	–	4	–	1
Pacific (OR)	0	–	5	–	0	0	–	9	–	0
$ – Conference champion; ^ – NAIA Division II playoff participant Whitworth forfeited two games; Rankings from NAIA Division II poll

1981 Northwest Conference football standings
	Conf.					Overall
Team	W		L		T	W		L		T
No. 5 Pacific Lutheran $^	5	–	0	–	0	9	–	1	–	0
No. 14 Linfield	4	–	1	–	0	7	–	2	–	0
Lewis & Clark	2	–	3	–	0	4	–	5	–	0
Whitworth	2	–	3	–	0	4	–	5	–	0
Willamette	2	–	3	–	0	4	–	5	–	0
Pacific (OR)	0	–	5	–	0	0	–	9	–	0
$ – Conference champion; ^ – NAIA Division II playoff participantpoll=NAIA Division II poll; Rankings from AP Poll

1982 Northwest Conference football standings
	Conf.					Overall
Team	W		L		T	W		L		T
No. 2 Linfield $^	5	–	0	–	0	12	–	0	–	0
No. 13 Pacific Lutheran	4	–	1	–	0	7	–	2	–	0
Whitworth	3	–	2	–	0	5	–	4	–	0
Pacific (OR)	2	–	3	–	0	2	–	7	–	0
Lewis & Clark	1	–	4	–	0	2	–	7	–	0
Willamette	0	–	5	–	0	1	–	8	–	0
$ – Conference champion; ^ – NAIA Division II playoff participant; Rankings from NAIA Division II poll

1983 Northwest Conference football standings
	Conf.					Overall
Team	W		L		T	W		L		T
No. 8 Pacific Lutheran $^	4	–	1	–	0	9	–	3	–	0
No. 14 Linfield	3	–	1	–	1	6	–	2	–	1
Whitworth	3	–	1	–	1	5	–	3	–	1
Lewis & Clark	2	–	3	–	0	4	–	5	–	0
Pacific (OR)	1	–	4	–	0	4	–	5	–	0
Willamette	1	–	4	–	0	1	–	8	–	0
$ – Conference champion; ^ – NAIA Division II playoff participant; Rankings from NAIA Division II poll

1984 Northwest Conference football standings
	Conf.					Overall
Team	W		L		T	W		L		T
No. 1 Linfield $^	4	–	0	–	0	12	–	0	–	0
Pacific Lutheran	3	–	1	–	0	6	–	3	–	0
Lewis & Clark	1	–	3	–	0	3	–	6	–	0
Willamette	1	–	3	–	0	2	–	5	–	2
Pacific (OR)	1	–	3	–	0	2	–	6	–	1
$ – Conference champion; ^ – NAIA Division II playoff participant; Rankings from NAIA Division II poll

1996 Northwest Conference football standings
	Conf.			Overall
Team	W		L	W		L
No. 7 Willamette $^	5	–	0	9	–	2
No. 15 Pacific Lutheran ^	4	–	1	7	–	3
Linfield	3	–	2	5	–	4
Lewis & Clark	2	–	3	4	–	6
Whitworth	1	–	4	1	–	8
Puget Sound	0	–	5	0	–	9
$ – Conference champion; ^ – NAIA Division II playoff participant; Rankings from NAIA Division II poll

1997 Northwest Conference football standings
	Conf.			Overall
Team	W		L	W		L
No. 2 Willamette $^	5	–	0	13	–	1
No. 19 Linfield	4	–	1	6	–	3
No. 17 Pacific Lutheran	3	–	2	7	–	2
Lewis & Clark	2	–	3	3	–	6
Whitworth	1	–	4	2	–	7
Puget Sound	0	–	5	2	–	7
$ – Conference champion; ^ – NAIA playoff participant; Rankings from NAIA poll

1998 Northwest Conference football standings
	Conf.			Overall
Team	W		L	W		L
Pacific Lutheran $^	5	–	0	8	–	2
Linfield	4	–	1	7	–	2
Willamette	3	–	2	7	–	3
Whitworth	2	–	3	5	–	5
Puget Sound	1	–	4	2	–	8
Lewis & Clark	0	–	5	1	–	7
$ – Conference champion; ^ – NCAA Division III playoff participant

1999 Northwest Conference football standings
	Conf.			Overall
Team	W		L	W		L
Willamette $^	5	–	0	7	–	4
Pacific Lutheran ^	4	–	1	13	–	1
Linfield	3	–	2	6	–	3
Whitworth	2	–	3	5	–	5
Puget Sound	1	–	4	1	–	8
Lewis & Clark	0	–	5	0	–	9
$ – Conference champion; ^ – NCAA Division III playoff participant

2000 Northwest Conference football standings
	Conf.			Overall
Team	W		L	W		L
Linfield $^	5	–	0	9	–	1
Pacific Lutheran ^	4	–	1	9	–	2
Whitworth	3	–	2	6	–	3
Puget Sound	2	–	3	5	–	4
Lewis & Clark	1	–	4	3	–	6
Willamette	0	–	5	3	–	7
$ – Conference champion; ^ – NCAA Division III playoff participant

2001 Northwest Conference football standings
	Conf.			Overall
Team	W		L	W		L
Linfield +	4	–	1	7	–	2
Whitworth +	4	–	1	7	–	2
Pacific Lutheran +^	4	–	1	8	–	3
Willamette	2	–	3	4	–	5
Lewis & Clark	1	–	4	3	–	6
Puget Sound	0	–	5	0	–	9
+ – Conference co-champions; ^ – NCAA Division III playoff participant

2002 Northwest Conference football standings
	Conf.			Overall
Team	W		L	W		L
Linfield $^	5	–	0	10	–	1
Whitworth	3	–	2	7	–	3
Willamette	3	–	2	6	–	3
Pacific Lutheran	3	–	2	5	–	4
Lewis & Clark	1	–	4	3	–	6
Puget Sound	0	–	5	1	–	8
$ – Conference champion; ^ – NCAA Division III playoff participant

2003 Northwest Conference football standings
	Conf.			Overall
Team	W		L	W		L
No. 3 Linfield $^	5	–	0	11	–	1
Willamette	4	–	1	7	–	3
Pacific Lutheran	3	–	2	6	–	3
Whitworth	2	–	3	4	–	6
Lewis & Clark	1	–	4	3	–	6
Puget Sound	0	–	5	0	–	9
$ – Conference champion; ^ – NCAA Division III playoff participant; Rankings from D3football.com

2004 Northwest Conference football standings
	Conf.			Overall
Team	W		L	W		L
No. 1 Linfield $^	5	–	0	13	–	0
No. 23 Willamette ^	4	–	1	7	–	4
Whitworth	3	–	2	7	–	2
Pacific Lutheran	2	–	3	6	–	3
Puget Sound	1	–	4	5	–	4
Lewis & Clark	0	–	5	1	–	8
$ – Conference champion; ^ – NCAA Division III playoff participant; Rankings from D3football.com

2005 Northwest Conference football standings
	Conf.			Overall
Team	W		L	W		L
No. 3 Linfield $^	4	–	0	10	–	1
Willamette	3	–	1	5	–	4
Whitworth	2	–	2	5	–	3
Puget Sound	1	–	3	4	–	5
Pacific Lutheran	0	–	4	3	–	6
Lewis & Clark *	0	–	0	0	–	4
$ – Conference champion; ^ – NCAA Division III playoff participant; * – Lewis & Clark's conference games were canceled.; Rankings from D3football.com

2006 Northwest Conference football standings
	Conf.			Overall
Team	W		L	W		L
No. 9 Whitworth $^	6	–	0	11	–	1
No. 23 Linfield	5	–	1	6	–	3
Pacific Lutheran	4	–	2	4	–	5
Puget Sound	3	–	3	7	–	3
Willamette	2	–	4	2	–	7
Menlo	1	–	5	4	–	6
Lewis & Clark	0	–	6	0	–	9
$ – Conference champion; ^ – NCAA Division III playoff participant; Rankings from D3football.com

2007 Northwest Conference football standings
	Conf.			Overall
Team	W		L	W		L
No. 24 Whitworth $	6	–	0	8	–	2
Pacific Lutheran	4	–	2	7	–	2
Linfield	4	–	2	6	–	3
Willamette	3	–	3	4	–	6
Puget Sound	2	–	4	4	–	5
Menlo	2	–	4	2	–	8
Lewis & Clark	0	–	6	0	–	9
$ – Conference champion; Rankings from D3football.com

2008 Northwest Conference football standings
	Conf.			Overall
Team	W		L	W		L
No. 4 Willamette $^	6	–	0	11	–	1
Linfield	5	–	1	6	–	3
Whitworth	4	–	2	6	–	3
Pacific Lutheran	3	–	3	3	–	6
Menlo	2	–	4	3	–	7
Puget Sound	1	–	5	3	–	6
Lewis & Clark	0	–	6	1	–	8
$ – Conference champion; ^ – NCAA Division III playoff participant; Rankings from D3football.com

2009 Northwest Conference football standings
	Conf.			Overall
Team	W		L	W		L
No. 3 Linfield $^	6	–	0	12	–	1
No. 24 Willamette	5	–	1	8	–	2
Whitworth	3	–	3	5	–	5
Menlo	3	–	3	4	–	6
Pacific Lutheran	3	–	3	3	–	6
Lewis & Clark	1	–	5	2	–	7
Puget Sound	0	–	6	0	–	9
$ – Conference champion; ^ – NCAA Division III playoff participant; Rankings from D3football.com

2010 Northwest Conference football standings
	Conf.			Overall
Team	W		L	W		L
No. 9 Linfield $^	6	–	0	9	–	2
No. 20 Pacific Lutheran	5	–	1	8	–	1
Willamette	4	–	2	7	–	3
Whitworth	3	–	3	5	–	5
Lewis & Clark	2	–	4	4	–	5
Puget Sound	1	–	5	2	–	7
Pacific (OR)	0	–	6	0	–	9
$ – Conference champion; ^ – NCAA Division III playoff participant; Rankings from D3football.com

2011 Northwest Conference football standings
	Conf.			Overall
Team	W		L	W		L
No. 6 Linfield $^	6	–	0	10	–	1
Lewis & Clark	4	–	2	7	–	2
Pacific Lutheran	4	–	2	6	–	3
Whitworth	3	–	3	4	–	6
Willamette	3	–	3	4	–	6
Pacific (OR)	1	–	5	1	–	8
Puget Sound	0	–	6	0	–	9
$ – Conference champion; ^ – NCAA Division III playoff participant; Rankings from D3football.com

2012 Northwest Conference football standings
	Conf.			Overall
Team	W		L	W		L
No. 5 Linfield $^	6	–	0	11	–	1
No. 17 Pacific Lutheran ^	5	–	1	7	–	3
Willamette	4	–	2	8	–	2
Whitworth	3	–	3	7	–	3
Pacific (OR)	2	–	4	3	–	6
Lewis & Clark	1	–	5	4	–	5
Puget Sound	0	–	6	0	–	9
$ – Conference champion; ^ – NCAA Division III playoff participant; Rankings from D3football.com

2013 Northwest Conference football standings
	Conf.			Overall
Team	W		L	W		L
No. 4 Linfield $^	6	–	0	11	–	1
No. 17 Pacific Lutheran ^	5	–	1	8	–	2
Willamette	4	–	2	7	–	2
Pacific (OR)	3	–	3	7	–	3
Whitworth	2	–	4	4	–	6
Lewis & Clark	1	–	5	1	–	8
Puget Sound	0	–	6	1	–	8
$ – Conference champion; ^ – NCAA Division III playoff participant; Rankings from D3football.com

2014 Northwest Conference football standings
	Conf.			Overall
Team	W		L	W		L
No. 3 Linfield +^	6	–	1	11	–	2
Pacific (OR) +	6	–	1	6	–	3
Pacific Lutheran	5	–	2	7	–	2
Whitworth	4	–	3	6	–	4
Willamette	3	–	4	5	–	4
Puget Sound	3	–	4	4	–	5
George Fox	1	–	6	1	–	8
Lewis & Clark	0	–	7	0	–	9
+ – Conference co-champions; ^ – NCAA Division III playoff participant; Rankings from D3football.com

2015 Northwest Conference football standings
	Conf.			Overall
Team	W		L	W		L
No. 3 Linfield $^	7	–	0	12	–	1
No. 20 Whitworth ^	6	–	1	9	–	2
Puget Sound	5	–	2	6	–	3
Pacific (OR)	4	–	3	6	–	4
George Fox	2	–	5	4	–	6
Pacific Lutheran	2	–	5	2	–	7
Willamette	2	–	5	2	–	7
Lewis & Clark	0	–	7	0	–	9
$ – Conference champion; ^ – NCAA Division III playoff participant; Rankings from D3football.com

2016 Northwest Conference football standings
	Conf.			Overall
Team	W		L	W		L
No. 7 Linfield $^	7	–	0	9	–	2
Whitworth	6	–	1	8	–	2
George Fox	5	–	2	5	–	4
Pacific Lutheran	4	–	3	5	–	4
Pacific (OR)	3	–	4	4	–	6
Willamette	2	–	5	3	–	7
Puget Sound	1	–	6	3	–	6
Lewis & Clark	0	–	7	0	–	9
$ – Conference champion; ^ – NCAA Division III playoff participant; Rankings from D3football.com

2017 Northwest Conference football standings
	Conf.			Overall
Team	W		L	W		L
No. 6 Linfield $^	7	–	0	9	–	2
Whitworth	5	–	2	8	–	2
George Fox	5	–	2	7	–	3
Pacific (OR)	4	–	3	4	–	4
Pacific Lutheran	4	–	3	4	–	4
Puget Sound	2	–	5	3	–	6
Lewis & Clark	1	–	6	2	–	7
Willamette	0	–	7	0	–	9
$ – Conference champion; ^ – NCAA Division III playoff participant; Rankings from D3football.com

2018 Northwest Conference football standings
	Conf.			Overall
Team	W		L	W		L
No. 10 Whitworth $^	7	–	0	10	–	1
No. 22 Linfield	6	–	1	7	–	2
George Fox	4	–	3	6	–	4
Pacific (OR)	4	–	3	5	–	5
Puget Sound	3	–	4	5	–	5
Pacific Lutheran	3	–	4	4	–	5
Lewis & Clark	1	–	6	2	–	7
Willamette	0	–	7	1	–	8
$ – Conference champion; ^ – NCAA Division III playoff participant; Rankings from D3football.com

2019 Northwest Conference football standings
	Conf.			Overall
Team	W		L	W		L
No. 19 Linfield $^	7	–	0	8	–	2
Whitworth	5	–	2	6	–	3
Puget Sound	4	–	3	6	–	4
George Fox	4	–	3	5	–	5
Pacific (OR)	4	–	3	4	–	6
Lewis & Clark	3	–	4	4	–	5
Pacific Lutheran	1	–	6	2	–	7
Willamette	0	–	7	1	–	8
$ – Conference champion; ^ – NCAA Division III playoff participant; Rankings from D3football.com
