= Ad Rutschman =

American college sports coach (born 1931)

Current position
- Title: Kick return coach
- Team: Linfield
- Conference: NWC

Biographical details
- Born: October 30, 1931 (age 95); Hillsboro, Oregon, U.S.

Coaching career (HC unless noted)

Football
- 1958–1967: Hillsboro HS (OR)
- 1968–1991: Linfield
- 2001–present: Linfield (KR)

Baseball
- 1955–1968: Hillsboro HS (OR)
- 1971–1983: Linfield

Head coaching record
- Overall: 183–48–3 (college football)
- Bowls: 1–2
- Tournaments: 11–6 (NAIA D-II playoffs)

Accomplishments and honors

Championships
- Football; 3 NAIA D-II National (1982, 1984, 1986); 12 NWC (1969–1972, 1974–1978, 1980, 1982, 1984); 2 CFL Southern Division (1985–1986); 1 CFA Mount Hood Division (1991) Baseball; 1 NAIA World Series (1971)

Awards
- Football; 3× NAIA Division II Coach of the Year (1982, 1984, 1986)
- College Football Hall of Fame; Inducted in 1998 (profile)

Adolph Rutschman (born October 30, 1931) is an American football coach, former baseball coach, and college athletics administrator. He was a head football coach for 24 seasons, head baseball coach for 13 seasons, and served as athletic director for 25 years at Linfield College. He is the first athletic director emeritus in the history of the college. He also served as head coach of football and baseball at his alma mater, Hillsboro High School. Rutschman was inducted into the College Football Hall of Fame in 1998.

== Early years ==
Rutschman was an athlete at Hillsboro High School (Hilhi Spartans) in his hometown of Hillsboro, Oregon. There he starred as a running back in the late 1940s, scoring 20 career touchdowns. After high school, he turned down a professional contract with the NFL's Detroit Lions and made up his mind to teach and coach sports. He received his degree in physical education and began teaching at Hilhi in 1954. He was an assistant baseball coach in 1955 before becoming the head baseball coach in 1956. He became the head football coach three years after that, winning a state championship in 1966.

As baseball coach of the Spartans he led the school to a co-state championship in 1962, with the title game rained out. He also led the team to both the 1966 and 1968 AAA state titles (the top division at that time in the OSAA). The 1966 team featured future Major League player Bob Beall, and the 1968 team Bob's brothers Jim and Gene. Rutschman also coached the first event, a baseball game, at Hillsboro's Hare Field in 1965. Hillsboro had four Little League teams when Rutschman began coaching at Hillsboro, but by the time he left, there were 41 teams.

After 13 years at Hillsboro High school, Rutschman was approached about taking over the head football coach position at Linfield College.

== Linfield College ==
Rutschman was hired as the head football coach at Linfield College in 1968. During his 24 seasons as Linfield head football coach, his teams won three NAIA national championship (1982, 1984, 1986) and 15 Northwest Conference championships. One of his most memorable coached games was the 1984 national championship. Linfield trailed defending NAIA-II champion Northwestern 22–0 with just over three minutes left in the third quarter, but would come back to win 33–22. His Wildcats played in a total of 20 post-season games in 12 different seasons. He led the team to a winning season in all 24 seasons as coach, part of Linfield's current all-divisions national record streak of 62 consecutive winning seasons (as of the end of the 2017 season). After the 1991 season, Rutschman retired from coaching with a career record of 183–48–3 (.788).

Rutschman also served as the head coach of the baseball program from 1971 to 1983. In his first season as the head baseball coach, he guided Linfield to the NAIA national championship. Before stepping down as head coach in 1983, he led the Wildcats to six conference championships and seven NAIA District 2 titles.

Rutschman is the only college coach at any level to have won national titles in both football and baseball. He was named Division II football coach of the year three times and was honored as the state of Oregon's Slats Gill man of the year five times, more than any other individual. Rutschman was named to the NAIA Hall of Fame in 1988, the Oregon Sports Hall of Fame in 1993 and was enshrined into the College Football Hall of Fame in 1998.

During his 25-year tenure as athletic director, the college's sports facilities took major leaps forward. The spacious and modern athletic complex, including two new gymnasiums, a swimming pool and multi-purpose field house, was constructed, a new baseball stadium was erected and the tennis courts were relocated and expanded. Locker rooms were renovated and a concession stand and ticket booth was built. The field house, a 26,600-square-foot (2,470 m^{2}) multi-purpose facility completed in 1995, was named in honor of Rutschman and his wife, Joan, for their 27 years of service to the college.

Rutschman retired as head coach of the football team in 1991, but returned in 2001 as kickoff return coach under head coach Jay Locey.

== Family ==
Rutschman's grandson, Adley Rutschman, was a catcher for the Oregon State Beavers baseball team. Adley was the College World Series Most Outstanding Player on Oregon State's 2018 College World Series championship team and was selected by the Baltimore Orioles with the first overall pick in the 2019 Major League Baseball draft.

== Head coaching record ==
=== College football ===
Year	Team	Overall	Conference	Standing	Bowl/playoffs
Linfield Wildcats (Northwest Conference) (1968–1984)
1968	Linfield	6–2–1	4–1–1	2nd	
1969	Linfield	6–3	4–2	T–1st	
1970	Linfield	8–1	6–0	1st	
1971	Linfield	5–4	4–2	T–1st	
1972	Linfield	6–3	6–0	1st	
1973	Linfield	7–2	5–2	2nd	
1974	Linfield	9–1	7–0	1st	L NAIA Division II Semifinal
1975	Linfield	6–3	6–1	T–1st	
1976	Linfield	7–3	6–1	1st	L NAIA District 2 Oregon Bowl
1977	Linfield	8–1	6–0	1st	L NAIA Division II Semifinal
1978	Linfield	9–1	5–0	1st	L NAIA Division II Semifinal
1979	Linfield	6–3–1	4–1	2nd	L NAIA District 2 Oregon Bowl
1980	Linfield	9–1	5–0	1st	L NAIA Division II Quarterfinal
1981	Linfield	8–2	4–1	2nd	W NAIA District 2 Oregon Bowl
1982	Linfield	12–0	5–0	1st	W NAIA Division II Championship
1983	Linfield	6–2–1	3–1–1	T–2nd	
1984	Linfield	12–0	4–0	1st	W NAIA Division II Championship
Linfield Wildcats (Columbia Football League) (1985–1987)
1985	Linfield	8–2	6–0	1st (Southern)	L NAIA Division II Quarterfinal
1986	Linfield	12–0	6–0	1st (Southern)	W NAIA Division II Championship
1987	Linfield	5–4	4–2	T–2nd (Southern)	
Linfield Wildcats (Columbia Football Association) (1988–1991)
1988	Linfield	7–2	4–2	2nd (Mount Hood)	
1989	Linfield	6–3	4–2	T–3rd (Mount Rainier)	
1990	Linfield	7–2	4–2	3rd (Mount Rainier)	
1991	Linfield	8–3	5–1	T–1st (Mount Hood)	L NAIA Division II Quarterfinal
Linfield:		183–48–4	117–21–2		
Total:		183–48–4			
National championship Conference title Conference division title or championship game berth
