= Linfield Wildcats =

- University: Linfield University
- NCAA: Division III
- Conference: Northwest Conference
- Athletic director: Scott Brosius
- Location: McMinnville, Oregon
- Varsity teams: 22
- Football stadium: Maxwell Field
- Basketball arena: Ted Wilson Gymnasium
- Baseball stadium: Roy Helser Field
- Soccer stadium: Soccer/Lacrosse Field
- Lacrosse stadium: Soccer/Lacrosse Field
- Colors: Purple and red
- Website: golinfieldwildcats.com

Team NCAA championships
- 4

The Linfield Wildcats are the athletic teams that represent Linfield University, located in McMinnville, Oregon, in NCAA Division III intercollegiate sports. The Wildcats compete as members of the Northwest Conference for all sports.

== Varsity teams ==
Men's sports	Women's sports
Baseball	Basketball
Basketball	Cheer & Dance
Cheer & Dance	Cross Country
Cross Country	Golf
Football	Soccer
Golf	Softball
Soccer	Swimming
Swimming	Tennis
Tennis	Track and field
Track and field	Volleyball
Wrestling	Wrestling

== National championships ==
Linfield has won four national college football titles (NCAA Division III: 2004, NAIA Division II: 1982, 1984, 1986) and have played in a total of seven college football national championship games (NAIA runner-ups in 1961, 1965, 1992). In addition, the school has won three national titles in baseball (NCAA Division III: 2013, NAIA Division II: 1966, 1971), and two national titles in softball in 2007 & 2011 (runner-ups in 2010 & 2012).

Year	Sport	Coach	Location	Assoc./Div.
1966	Baseball	Roy Helser		NAIA
1971	Baseball	Ad Rutschman	Municipal Stadium, Phoenix, Arizona	NAIA
1982	Football	Ad Rutschman	Maxwell Field, McMinnville, Oregon	NAIA Division II
1984	Football	Ad Rutschman	Maxwell Field, McMinnville, Oregon	NAIA Division II
1986	Football	Ad Rutschman	Maxwell Field, McMinnville, Oregon	NAIA Division II
2004	Football	Jay Locey	Salem, Virginia	NCAA Division III
2007	Softball	Jackson Vaughan	Moyer Sports Complex, Salem, Virginia	NCAA Division III
2011	Softball	Jackson Vaughan	Moyer Sports Complex, Salem, Virginia	NCAA Division III
2013	Baseball	Scott Brosius	Fox Cities Stadium, Grand Chute, Wisconsin	NCAA Division III

== Notable student-athletes ==
Notable student-athletes include former New York Yankee Scott Brosius, who was the head baseball coach at the college for eight years until 2015; former San Diego Charger Brett Elliott, the quarterback of the 2004 championship team; and former Miami Dolphins general manager Randy Mueller, quarterback of Linfield's 1982 NAIA Championship squad.

Brosius returned to Linfield University as its athletic director in May 2024.
