= Dennis Gorsline =

American football player and coach (born 1943)

Biographical details
- Born: April 9, 1943 (age 83); Saginaw, Michigan, U.S.
- Education: Northern Michigan University (1967)

Playing career
- 1963–1966: Northern Michigan

Coaching career (HC unless noted)
- 1972–2003: Martin Luther
- 2017–2019: Martin Luther (assistant)

Head coaching record
- Overall: 123–132–5

Accomplishments and honors

Championships
- 3 UMAC (1977, 1996, 1998)

Dennis Gorsline (born April 9, 1943) is an American former college football coach. He was the head football coach at the Martin Luther College in New Ulm, Minnesota. He began his tenure in 1972 when he resurrected the program after it had been shut down in 1937 and ended when he retired from full-time coaching in 2003.

== Head coaching record ==
=== College ===
Year	Team	Overall	Conference	Standing	Rank^{#}
Martin Luther Knights (Upper Midwest Athletic Conference) (1972–2003)
1972	Dr. Martin Luther	0–7			
1973	Dr. Martin Luther	3–5			
1974	Dr. Martin Luther	2–5–1			
1975	Dr. Martin Luther	3–4			
1976	Dr. Martin Luther	2–6			
1977	Dr. Martin Luther	4–4			
1978	Dr. Martin Luther	4–4			
1979	Dr. Martin Luther	2–5–1			
1980	Dr. Martin Luther	3–5			
1981	Dr. Martin Luther	4–4			
1982	Dr. Martin Luther	3–4–1			
1983	Dr. Martin Luther	2–6			
1984	Dr. Martin Luther	4–3–1			
1985	Dr. Martin Luther	4–4			
1986	Dr. Martin Luther	6–3			
1987	Dr. Martin Luther	3–6			
1988	Dr. Martin Luther	3–5			
1989	Dr. Martin Luther	2–6			
1990	Dr. Martin Luther	4–3			
1991	Dr. Martin Luther	5–4			
1992	Dr. Martin Luther	4–4			
1993	Dr. Martin Luther	7–1			
1994	Dr. Martin Luther	2–5–1			
1995	Martin Luther	6–2			
1996	Martin Luther	4–4			
1997	Martin Luther	6–3			
1998	Martin Luther	5–3			
1999	Martin Luther	5–3			
2000	Martin Luther	4–4	4–2		
2001	Martin Luther	4–5	4–2		
2002	Martin Luther	6–3	6–1		
2003	Martin Luther	7–2	6–2		
Martin Luther:		123–132–5			
Total:		123–132–5			
National championship Conference title Conference division title or championship game berth
