= 1980 college football season =

1980 college football season may refer to:

- 1980 NCAA Division I-A football season
- 1980 NCAA Division I-AA football season
- 1980 NCAA Division II football season
- 1980 NCAA Division III football season
- 1980 NAIA Division I football season
- 1980 NAIA Division II football season
