= Joseph Smith (American football) =

American football player and coach

Current position
- Title: Head coach
- Team: Linfield
- Conference: NWC
- Record: 173–33

Playing career
- 1989–1992: Linfield
- Position: Cornerback

Coaching career (HC unless noted)
- 1999–2005: Linfield (DC)
- 2006–present: Linfield

Head coaching record
- Overall: 173–33
- Tournaments: 21–13 (NCAA D-III playoffs)

Accomplishments and honors

Championships
- 13 NWC (2009–2017, 2019, 2021–2022, 2024)

Joseph Smith is an American college football coach and former player. He is the head football coach for Linfield College, a position he has held since 2006.

== Head coaching record ==
Year	Team	Overall	Conference	Standing	Bowl/playoffs	D3^{#}	AFCA^{°}
Linfield Wildcats (Northwest Conference) (2006–present)
2006	Linfield	6–3	5–1	2nd		23	
2007	Linfield	6–3	4–2	T–2nd			
2008	Linfield	6–3	5–1	2nd			
2009	Linfield	12–1	6–0	1st	L NCAA Division III Semifinal	3	
2010	Linfield	9–2	6–0	1st	L NCAA Division III Second Round	9	
2011	Linfield	10–1	6–0	1st	L NCAA Division III Second Round	6	
2012	Linfield	11–1	6–0	1st	L NCAA Division III Quarterfinal	5	
2013	Linfield	11–1	6–0	1st	L NCAA Division III Quarterfinal	4	
2014	Linfield	11–2	6–1	T–1st	L NCAA Division III Semifinal	3	
2015	Linfield	12–1	9–0	1st	L NCAA Division III Semifinal	3	
2016	Linfield	9–2	7–0	1st	L NCAA Division III Second Round	7	
2017	Linfield	9–2	7–0	1st	L NCAA Division III Second Round	6	
2018	Linfield	7–2	6–1	2nd		22	
2019	Linfield	8–2	7–0	1st	L NCAA Division III First Round	19	
2020–21	No team—COVID-19						
2021	Linfield	11–1	7–0	1st	L NCAA Division III Quarterfinal	6	
2022	Linfield	10–1	7–0	1st	L NCAA Division III Second Round		
2023	Linfield	8–1	6–1	2nd			24
2024	Linfield	10–2	7–0	1st	L NCAA Division III Third Round	17	14
2025	Linfield	7–2	6–1	2nd			
2026	Linfield	0–0	0–0				
Linfield:		173–33	119–8				
Total:		173–33					
National championship Conference title Conference division title or championship game berth
