= Gorsline =

Gorsline is a surname. Notable people with the surname include:

- Dennis Gorsline (born 1943), American football coach
- Douglas Gorsline (1913–1985), American painter and writer
- William R. Gorsline (1824–1879), American justice from Colorado
