= Nathan Hinkle =

American football coach

Coaching career (HC unless noted)
- 1980: Doane

Head coaching record
- Overall: 4–6

Nathan Hinkle is an American former football coach. He served as the 29th head football coach at Doane College in Crete, Nebraska and he held that position for the 1980 season. His coaching record at Doane was 4–6.

== Head coaching record ==
Year	Team	Overall	Conference	Standing	Bowl/playoffs
Doane Tigers (Nebraska Intercollegiate Athletic Conference) (1980)
1980	Doane	4–6	3–2	T–2nd	
Doane:		4–6	3–2		
Total:		4–6			
