= 1971 NAIA World Series =

1971 NAIA baseball tournament
- 1971 NAIA World Series
- Teams: 8
- Format: Double elimination
- Finals site: Phoenix Municipal Stadium; Phoenix, Arizona
- Champions: Linfield (2nd title)
- Winning coach: Ad Rutschman
- MVP: Rob Webb (C) (Linfield)

The 1971 NAIA World Series was the 15th annual tournament hosted by the National Association of Intercollegiate Athletics to determine the national champion of baseball among its member colleges and universities in the United States and Canada.

The tournament was played at Phoenix Municipal Stadium in Phoenix, Arizona.

Linfield (28-11) defeated David Lipscomb (44-15) in the first game of the championship series, 9–8, to win the Wildcats' second NAIA World Series (the first team to win a second) and first since 1966.

Linfield catcher Rob Webb was named tournament MVP.

== Bracket ==
Upper round 1
Southwestern State	9
Oshkosh State	6
Grand Canyon	9
Linfield	10
Appalachian State	5
Indiana (PA)	7
David Lipscomb	4
Lewis (IL)	13

Upper round 2
Southwestern State	6
Linfield	9
Indiana (PA)	11
Lewis (IL)	9
Lower round 1
Oshkosh State	7
Grand Canyon	3
Appalachian State	13
David Lipscomb	14

Upper final
Linfield	6
Indiana (PA)	5
Lower round 2
Lewis (IL)	7
Oshkosh State	3
Southwestern State	3
David Lipscomb	4

Semifinals
Linfield	7
Lewis (IL)	2
Indiana (PA)	6
David Lipscomb	7

Final
Linfield	9	–
David Lipscomb	8	–

== See also ==
- 1971 NCAA University Division baseball tournament
- 1971 NCAA College Division baseball tournament
