= 1980 Valley City State Vikings football team =

American college football season

1980 Valley City State Vikings football
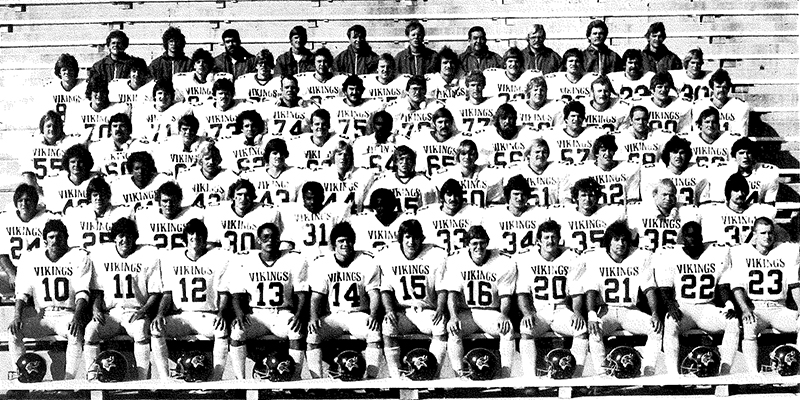

NDCAC champion

NAIA Division II Semifinal, L 0–32 at Pacific Lutheran
- Conference: North Dakota College Athletic Conference
- Record: 10–1 (6–0 NDCAC)
- Head coach: Jim Dew (7th season)
- Home stadium: Lokken Stadium

1980 North Dakota College Athletic Conference football standings
	Conf.					Overall
Team	W		L		T	W		L		T
No. 6 Valley City State $^	6	–	0	–	0	10	–	1	–	0
No. 18 Dickinson State	4	–	2	–	0	7	–	2	–	0
Jamestown	4	–	2	–	0	6	–	3	–	0
Mayville State	3	–	3	–	0	6	–	3	–	0
Minot State	3	–	3	–	0	5	–	4	–	0
North Dakota Science	1	–	5	–	0	2	–	7	–	0
Bismarck JC	0	–	6	–	0	2	–	5	–	0
$ – Conference champion; ^ – NAIA Division II playoff participant; Rankings from NAIA Division II poll

The 1980 Valley City State Vikings football team represented Valley City State College—now known as Valley City State University—as a member of the North Dakota College Athletic Conference (NDCAC) during the 1980 NAIA Division II football season. Under seventh-year head coach Jim Dew, the Vikings posted an overall record of 10–1 and a perfect 6–0 mark in conference play, winning the NDCAC championship. Valley City State advanced to the NAIA Division II football national championship playoffs, and became the first NDCAC program to win an NAIA playoff game, defeating McMurry, 16–7, in quarterfinals before falling to the eventual national champion, Pacific Lutheran, in the semifinals. The 1980 team was inducted into the Valley City State Vikings Hall of Fame in 1996.

Valley City State opened the 1980 campaign with a non-conference win over Northern State, and rebounded from an early loss to Bemidji State to run the table the rest of the regular season. The Vikings went 6–0 in NDCAC play, including narrow victories over Jamestown, Dickinson State, and Minot State, and shutout wins against Bismarck JC and Westmar.

== Schedule ==
Date	Time	Opponent	Site	Result	Attendance	Source
September 6		Northern State*	Valley City, ND	W 20–6		
September 13		at Bemidji State*	Bemidji, MN	W 6–21 (forfeit win)		
September 20		at Jamestown	Jamestown, ND (rivalry)	W 22–20		
September 27		Dickinson State	Valley City, ND (rivalry)	W 9–7		
October 4		at Bismarck JC	Bismarck, ND	W 40–0		
October 11		Mayville State	Valley City, ND (rivalry)	W 42–14		
October 18		at North Dakota Science	Wahpeton, ND	W 34–10		
October 25		Minot State	Valley City, ND	W 14–10		
November 1		at Westmar*	LeMars, IA	W 15–0		
November 22	11:00 a.m.	at McMurry*	Indian Stadium; Abilene, TX (NAIA Division II Quarterfinal)	W 16–7	1,200	
December 6		at Pacific Lutheran*	Lincoln Bowl; Tacoma, WA (NAIA Division II Semifinal)	L 0–32		
*Non-conference game; All times are in Central time

== Coaching staff ==
Head coach Jim Dew led a staff that included assistants Don Lemnus, Bob Bruhschwein, and Glen Schmalz. Student assistants were Jeff Leech, Brent Ham, and Kent Schweigert.

== Hall of Fame ==
The 1980 team was inducted into the Valley City State Vikings Hall of Fame in 1996 in recognition of its conference title, playoff success, and overall impact on the program.
