= 1992 Findlay Oilers football team =

American college football season

1992 Findlay Oilers football

NAIA Division II champion

NAIA Division II Championship Game, W 26–13 vs. Linfield
- Conference: Independent
- Record: 12–1
- Head coach: Dick Strahm (18th season)
- Home stadium: Donnell Stadium

1992 NAIA Division II independents football records
	Conf.			Overall
Team	W	L	T	W		L		T
No. 4 Findlay ^		–		12	–	1	–	0
No. 1 Westminster (PA) ^		–		10	–	1	–	0
No. 18 Peru State		–		7	–	2	–	1
Azusa Pacific		–		4	–	5	–	0
Geneva		–		4	–	5	–	0
Mount St. Joseph		–		4	–	5	–	0
St. Ambrose		–		4	–	6	–	0
Tiffin		–		4	–	6	–	0
Clinch Valley		–		3	–	7	–	0
Trinity (IL)		–		2	–	7	–	1
Cumberland (TN)		–		2	–	8	–	0
Oklahoma Panhandle State		–		2	–	8	–	0
Westmar		–		1	–	8	–	0
Lindenwood		–		1	–	9	–	0
^ – NAIA Division II playoff participant; Rankings from NAIA Division II poll

The 1992 Findlay Oilers football team was an American football team that represented the University of Findlay as an independent during the 1992 NAIA Division II football season. In their 18th season under head coach Dick Strahm, the Oilers compiled a 12–1 record, outscored opponents by a total of 408 to 154, and won the NAIA Division II national championship, defeating Linfield, 26–13, in the NAIA Division II Championship Game.

The team played its home games at Donnell Stadium in Findlay, Ohio.

== Schedule ==
Date	Opponent	Site	Result	Attendance	Source
September 5	at Kentucky State	Frankfort, KY	W 23–13	1,800 (est)	
September 26	Lindenwood	Donnell Stadium; Findlay, OH	W 33–0		
October 3	Union (KY)	Donnell Stadium; Findlay, OH	W 56–28		
October 10	at Campbellsville	Campbellsville, KY	W 28–7		
October 17	at Westminster (PA)	New Wilmington, PA	L 17–30		
October 24	Tiffin		W 21–0		
October 31	Urbana	Findlay, OH	W 47–12		
November 7	Northwood	Findlay, OH	W 21–6		
November 14	Lees–McRae	Donnell Stadium; Findlay, OH	W 64–0		
November 21	Georgetown (KY)	Donnell Stadium; Findlay, OH (NAIA Division II first round)	W 32–14		
December 5	at Westminster (PA)	New Wilmington, PA (NAIA Division II quarterfinal)	W 13–7		
December 12	Benedictine (KS)	Donnell Stadium; Findlay, OH (NAIA Division II semifinal)	W 27–24		
December 19	at Linfield	Civic Stadium; Portland, OR (NAIA Division II Championship Game)	W 26–13	9,141	
