= 1971 NCAA College Division baseball tournament =

- Season: 1971
- Teams: 21
- Finals site: Meador Park; Springfield, Missouri
- Champions: Florida Southern (1st title)
- Runner-up: Central Michigan (1st CWS Appearance)
- Winning coach: Hal Smeltzly (1st title)
- MOP: Greg Pryor & Kevin Bryant (Florida Southern)

The 1971 NCAA College Division baseball tournament decided the champion of baseball at the NCAA College Division level for the 1971 season. This was the fourth such tournament for the College Division, having separated from the University Division in 1957. The Florida Southern Moccasins won the championship by defeating the Central Michigan.

== Format ==
Twenty-one teams were selected to participate, divided into four regions. Two regions consisted of six teams, another had five, and the West had four. Each region completed a double-elimination round, with the winners advancing to the finals. The finals, made up of the four regional champions, also competed in a double-elimination format.

== Regionals ==
=== East Regional ===
Team	Wins	Losses
Florida Southern	3	0
Old Dominion	2	1
Saint Leo	1	1
Springfield	1	2
Ithaca	1	2
Upsala	0	2

=== Mideast Regional ===
Team	Wins	Losses
Central Michigan	4	1
SIU Edwardsville	3	2
Louisiana Tech	3	2
Tennessee–Martin	1	2
Chattanooga	0	2
Marietta	0	2

=== Midwest Regional ===
Team	Wins	Losses
Mankato State	3	0
Northern Colorado	3	2
St. Cloud State	2	2
Central Missouri	0	2
Luther (IA)	0	2

=== West Regional ===
Team	Wins	Losses
San Diego	3	0
Valley State	2	2
Puget Sound	1	2
UC Irvine	0	2

== Finals ==
=== Participants ===
School	Conference	Record (conference)	Head coach	Previous finals appearances	Best finals finish	Finals record
Central Michigan	Independent	35–7–1	Dave Keilitz	0 (last: none)	none	0–0
Florida Southern	Independent	34–4	Hal Smeltzly	1 (last: 1969)	3rd	1–2
Mankato State	North Central	22–12 (14–6)	Jean McCarthy	0 (last: none)	none	0–0
San Diego	Independent	34–12	John Cunningham	0 (last: none)	none	0–0

=== Results ===
==== Bracket ====
First round
San Diego	5
Florida Southern	4
Central Michigan	9
Mankato State	0
Lower round 1
Florida Southern	6
Mankato State	0

Semi-finals
San Diego	3
Central Michigan	5
Lower final
San Diego	4
Florida Southern	11

Finals
Central Michigan	6	0
Florida Southern	9	4

==== Game results ====
Game	Winner	Score	Loser	Notes
Game 1	San Diego	5–4	Florida Southern	
Game 2	Central Michigan	9–0	Mankato State	
Game 3	Florida Southern	6–0	Mankato State	Mankato State eliminated
Game 4	Central Michigan	5–3	San Diego	
Game 5	Florida Southern	11–4	San Diego	San Diego eliminated
Game 6	Florida Southern	9–6	Central Michigan	
Game 7	Florida Southern	4–0	Central Michigan	Florida Southern wins National Championship

== See also ==
- 1971 NCAA University Division baseball tournament
- 1971 NAIA World Series
