= 1980 Pacific Lutheran Lutes football team =

American college football season

1980 Pacific Lutheran Lutes football

NAIA Division II national champion NWC champion

NAIA Division II Championship Game, W 38–10 vs. Wilmington (OH)
- Conference: Northwest Conference
- Record: 11–1 (4–1 NWC)
- Head coach: Frosty Westering (9th season)
- Home stadium: Franklin Pierce Stadium, Lincoln Bowl

1980 Northwest Conference football standings
	Conf.					Overall
Team	W		L		T	W		L		T
No. 3 Linfield $^	5	–	0	–	0	9	–	1	–	0
No. 1 Pacific Lutheran ^	4	–	1	–	0	11	–	1	–	0
Willamette	2	–	2	–	1	3	–	4	–	1
Whitworth	2	–	3	–	0	2	–	7	–	0
Lewis & Clark	1	–	3	–	1	4	–	4	–	1
Pacific (OR)	0	–	5	–	0	0	–	9	–	0
$ – Conference champion; ^ – NAIA Division II playoff participant Whitworth forfeited two games; Rankings from NAIA Division II poll

The 1980 Pacific Lutheran Lutes football team was an American football team that represented Pacific Lutheran University in the Northwest Conference (NWC) during the 1980 NAIA Division II football season. In their ninth season under head coach Frosty Westering, the Lutes compiled an 11–1 record and won the NAIA Division II national championship. The team participated in the NAIA Division II playoffs where they defeated Linfield (35–20) in the quarterfinal, Valley City State (32–0) in the semifinal, and Wilmington (OH) (38–10) in the national championship game.

The team played its home games at Franklin Pierce Stadium and the Lincoln Bowl, both in Tacoma, Washington.

Coach Westering won four national championships at Pacific Lutheran (1980, 1987, 1993, and 1999) and was inducted into the College Football Hall of Fame in 2005.

== Schedule ==
Date	Opponent	Site	Result	Attendance	Source
September 20	Western Washington*	Tacoma, WA	W 30–0		
September 27	at Humboldt State*	Redwood Bowl; Arcata, CA	W 45–14		
October 4	at Central Washington*	Ellensburg, WA	W 24–3		
October 11	Southern Oregon*	Franklin Pierce Stadium; Tacoma, WA	W 25–0		
October 18	Whitworth	Tacoma, WA	W 39–38		
October 25	Pacific (OR)	Tacoma, WA	W 41–20		
November 1	at Linfield	McMinnville, OR	L 19–20		
November 8	Lewis & Clark	Tacoma, WA	W 27–0		
November 15	at Willamette	Salem, OR	W 42–7		
November 22	Linfield	Lincoln Bowl; Tacoma, WA (NAIA Division II Quarterfinal)	W 35–20		
December 6	Valley City State	Lincoln Bowl; Tacoma, WA (NAIA Division II Semifinal)	W 32–0		
December 13	Wilmington (OH)	Lincoln Bowl; Tacoma, WA (NAIA Division II Championship Game)	W 38–10		
*Non-conference game
