= 1986 Linfield Wildcats football team =

American college football season

1986 Linfield Wildcats football

NAIA Division II national champion CFL champion

NAIA Division II Championship Game, W 17–0 vs. Baker
- Conference: Columbia Football League
- Southern Division
- Record: 12–0 (6–0 CFL)
- Head coach: Ad Rutschman (19th season)
- Home stadium: Maxwell Field

1986 Columbia Football League standings
	Conf.					Overall
Team	W		L		T	W		L		T
Northern Division
No. 5 Pacific Lutheran x^	6	–	0	–	0	8	–	1	–	0
No. 19 Central Washington	4	–	2	–	0	6	–	3	–	0
Puget Sound	4	–	2	–	0	6	–	3	–	0
No. 18 Simon Fraser	4	–	2	–	0	6	–	3	–	0
Whitworth	1	–	4	–	1	2	–	6	–	1
Western Washington	1	–	5	–	0	2	–	7	–	0
Eastern Oregon	0	–	5	–	1	0	–	8	–	1
Southern Division
No. 1 Linfield x^	6	–	0	–	0	12	–	0	–	0
No. 13 Western Oregon	5	–	1	–	0	7	–	2	–	0
Oregon Tech	4	–	2	–	0	5	–	4	–	0
Southern Oregon	2	–	4	–	0	4	–	5	–	0
Willamette	2	–	4	–	0	4	–	5	–	0
Pacific (OR)	1	–	5	–	0	2	–	7	–	0
Lewis & Clark	1	–	5	–	0	1	–	8	–	0
x – Division champion/co-champions; ^ – NAIA Division II playoff participant; Rankings from NAIA Division I poll for Central Washington, Simon Fraser, and Western Oregon and NAIA Division II poll for Pacific Lutheran and Linfield

The 1986 Linfield Wildcats football team was an American football team that represented Linfield University and won the national championship during the 1986 NAIA Division II football season. In their 19th season under head coach Ad Rutschman, the Wildcats compiled a perfect 12–0 record and won the Columbia Football League (CFL) championship. They participated in the NAIA Division II playoffs, defeating Pacific Lutheran (27–21) in the quarterfinals, Carroll (MT) (53–7) in the semifinals, and Baker (17–0) in the NAIA Division II Championship Game.

== Schedule ==
Date	Opponent	Site	Result	Attendance	Source
September 20	at Central Washington	Ellensburg, WA	W 41–32		
September 27	Western Oregon	Maxwell Field; McMinnville, OR	W 45–14		
October 4	Pacific Lutheran	Maxwell Field; McMinnville, OR	W 43–17		
October 11	at Willamette	Salem, OR	W 49–14		
October 18	Southern Oregon	Maxwell Field; McMinnville, OR	W 28–14		
October 25	Simon Fraser	Maxwell Field; McMinnville, OR	W 14–0		
November 1	at Lewis & Clark	Portland, OR	W 42–7		
November 8	at Oregon Tech	Klamath Falls, OR	W 38–20		
November 15	Pacific (OR)	Maxwell Field; McMinnville, OR	W 42–26		
November 22	at Pacific Lutheran	Tacoma, WA	W 27–21 ^{OT}		
November 29	Carroll (MT)	Maxwell Field; McMinnville, OR	W 53–7		
December 13	Baker	Wortman Stadium; McMinnville, OR	W 17–0	4,167	
