= 1984 Linfield Wildcats football team =

American college football season

1984 Linfield Wildcats football

NAIA Division II national champion NWC champion

NAIA Division II Championship Game, W 33–22 vs. Northwestern (IA)
- Conference: Northwest Conference
- Record: 12–0 (4–0 NWC)
- Head coach: Ad Rutschman (17th season)
- Home stadium: Maxwell Field

1984 Northwest Conference football standings
| | Conf. | | | | | Overall |
| Team | W | | L | | T | W | | L | | T |
|---|---|---|---|---|---|---|---|---|---|---|
| No. 1 Linfield $^ | 4 | – | 0 | – | 0 | 12 | – | 0 | – | 0 |
| Pacific Lutheran | 3 | – | 1 | – | 0 | 6 | – | 3 | – | 0 |
| Lewis & Clark | 1 | – | 3 | – | 0 | 3 | – | 6 | – | 0 |
| Willamette | 1 | – | 3 | – | 0 | 2 | – | 5 | – | 2 |
| Pacific (OR) | 1 | – | 3 | – | 0 | 2 | – | 6 | – | 1 |
$ – Conference champion; ^ – NAIA Division II playoff participant; Rankings from NAIA Division II poll

The 1984 Linfield Wildcats football team was an American football team that represented Linfield University and won the national championship during the 1984 NAIA Division II football season. In their 17th season under head coach Ad Rutschman, the Wildcats compiled a perfect 12–0 record and won the Northwest Conference (NWC) championship. They participated in the NAIA Division II playoffs, defeating Saint Ambrose (26–0) in the quarterfinals, Hanover (55–14) in the semifinals, and Northwestern (IA) (33–22) in the NAIA Division II Championship Game.

== Schedule ==
| Date | Opponent | Site | Result | Attendance | Source |
|---|---|---|---|---|---|
| September 15 | at Puget Sound* | Tacoma, WA | W 30–24 | | |
| September 22 | Southern Oregon* | Maxwell Field; McMinnville, OR | W 14–12 | | |
| September 29 | Western Oregon* | Maxwell Field; McMinnville, OR | W 21–6 | | |
| October 6 | at Oregon Tech* | Klamath Falls, OR | W 10–7 | | |
| October 13 | at Whitworth* | Spokane, WA | W 25–12 | | |
| October 20 | Pacific Lutheran | Maxwell Field; McMinnville, OR | W 24–10 | | |
| October 27 | Pacific (OR) | Maxwell Field; McMinnville, OR | W 2–0 | | |
| November 3 | at Lewis & Clark | Portland, OR | W 28–14 | | |
| November 10 | Willamette | Maxwell Field; McMinnville, OR | W 55–0 | | |
| November 17 | Saint Ambrose | Maxwell Field; McMinnville, OR | W 26–0 | | |
| December 1 | Hanover | Maxwell Field; McMinnville, OR | W 55–14 | 2,600 | |
| December 8 | Northwestern (IA) | Wortman Stadium; McMinnville, OR | W 33–22 | 3,562 | |
*Non-conference game
