= 1986 NAIA Division II football season =

American college football season

- Regular season: August–November 1986
- Postseason: November–December 1986
- National Championship: Maxwell Field; McMinnville, OR
- Champions: Linfield (3)

The 1986 NAIA Division II football season, as part of the 1986 college football season in the United States and the 31st season of college football sponsored by the NAIA, was the 17th season of play of the NAIA's lower division for football.

The season was played from August to November 1986 and culminated in the 1986 NAIA Division II Football National Championship, played at Maxwell Field on the campus of Linfield College in McMinnville, Oregon.

Linfield defeated Baker in the championship game, 17–0, to win their third NAIA national title.

== Conference standings ==
1986 Columbia Football League standings
	Conf.					Overall
Team	W		L		T	W		L		T
Northern Division
No. 5 Pacific Lutheran x^	6	–	0	–	0	8	–	1	–	0
No. 19 Central Washington	4	–	2	–	0	6	–	3	–	0
Puget Sound	4	–	2	–	0	6	–	3	–	0
No. 18 Simon Fraser	4	–	2	–	0	6	–	3	–	0
Whitworth	1	–	4	–	1	2	–	6	–	1
Western Washington	1	–	5	–	0	2	–	7	–	0
Eastern Oregon	0	–	5	–	1	0	–	8	–	1
Southern Division
No. 1 Linfield x^	6	–	0	–	0	12	–	0	–	0
No. 13 Western Oregon	5	–	1	–	0	7	–	2	–	0
Oregon Tech	4	–	2	–	0	5	–	4	–	0
Southern Oregon	2	–	4	–	0	4	–	5	–	0
Willamette	2	–	4	–	0	4	–	5	–	0
Pacific (OR)	1	–	5	–	0	2	–	7	–	0
Lewis & Clark	1	–	5	–	0	1	–	8	–	0
x – Division champion/co-champions; ^ – NAIA Division II playoff participant; Rankings from NAIA Division I poll for Central Washington, Simon Fraser, and Western Oregon and NAIA Division II poll for Pacific Lutheran and Linfield

1986 Frontier Conference football standings
	Conf.					Overall
Team	W		L		T	W		L		T
No. 4 Carroll (MT) $^	6	–	0	–	0	9	–	1	–	0
Western Montana	3	–	3	–	0	4	–	4	–	0
Rocky Mountain	3	–	3	–	0	4	–	5	–	0
Montana Tech	0	–	6	–	0	0	–	8	–	0
$ – Conference champion; ^ – NAIA Division II playoff participant; Rankings from NAIA Division II poll

1986 Heart of America Athletic Conference football standings
	Conf.					Overall
Team	W		L		T	W		L		T
No. 6 Baker $^	7	–	0	–	0	9	–	2	–	0
Culver–Stockton	4	–	3	–	0	4	–	5	–	1
Missouri Valley	4	–	3	–	0	4	–	6	–	0
William Jewell	4	–	3	–	0	4	–	6	–	0
Central Methodist	3	–	4	–	0	4	–	6	–	0
Tarkio	2	–	5	–	0	5	–	5	–	0
MidAmerica Nazarene	2	–	5	–	0	4	–	5	–	0
Graceland	2	–	5	–	0	4	–	6	–	0
$ – Conference champion; ^ – NAIA Division II playoff participant; Rankings from NAIA Division II poll

1986 Illini–Badger Football Conference standings
	Conf.					Overall
Team	W		L		T	W		L		T
No. 13 Lakeland $	5	–	0	–	0	9	–	1	–	0
Concordia (WI)	3	–	2	–	0	5	–	4	–	0
Eureka	3	–	2	–	0	3	–	5	–	1
Concordia (IL)	2	–	3	–	0	3	–	6	–	0
Northeastern Illinois	1	–	4	–	0	3	–	7	–	0
Principia	1	–	4	–	0	1	–	7	–	0
$ – Conference champion; Rankings from NAIA Division II poll

1986 Kansas Collegiate Athletic Conference football standings
	Conf.					Overall
Team	W		L		T	W		L		T
No. 12 Bethany (KS) $	8	–	1	–	0	8	–	1	–	0
No. 15 Bethel (KS)	7	–	2	–	0	7	–	2	–	0
No. 19 Southwestern (KS)	7	–	2	–	0	7	–	3	–	0
Kansas Wesleyan	6	–	3	–	0	6	–	4	–	0
Sterling	6	–	3	–	0	6	–	4	–	0
St. Mary of the Plains	4	–	5	–	0	4	–	6	–	0
Tabor	3	–	6	–	0	3	–	6	–	0
Friends	2	–	7	–	0	2	–	7	–	0
Ottawa	2	–	7	–	0	2	–	8	–	0
McPherson	0	–	9	–	0	0	–	9	–	0
$ – Conference champion; Rankings from NAIA Division II poll

1986 Nebraska Intercollegiate Athletic Conference football standings
	Conf.					Overall
Team	W		L		T	W		L		T
No. 14 Nebraska Wesleyan $	5	–	0	–	0	7	–	3	–	0
Hastings	3	–	2	–	0	6	–	4	–	0
Dana	3	–	2	–	0	6	–	4	–	0
Doane	3	–	2	–	0	5	–	5	–	0
Concordia (NE)	1	–	4	–	0	4	–	6	–	0
Midland	0	–	5	–	0	2	–	7	–	0
$ – Conference champion; Rankings from NAIA Division II poll

1986 North Dakota College Athletic Conference football standings
	Conf.					Overall
Team	W		L		T	W		L		T
No. 3 Dickinson State $^	5	–	0	–	0	9	–	1	–	0
Valley City State	4	–	1	–	0	6	–	3	–	0
Minot State	3	–	2	–	0	5	–	4	–	0
Jamestown	2	–	3	–	0	5	–	4	–	0
Mayville State	1	–	4	–	0	2	–	7	–	0
NDSCS–Wahpeton	0	–	5	–	0	1	–	5	–	0
$ – Conference champion; ^ – NAIA Division II playoff participant; Rankings from NAIA Division II poll

1986 South Dakota Intercollegiate Conference football standings
	Conf.					Overall
Team	W		L		T	W		L		T
No. 7 Huron $^	5	–	0	–	0	9	–	1	–	1
South Dakota Tech	3	–	2	–	0	3	–	6	–	0
Dakota Wesleyan	2	–	3	–	0	4	–	6	–	0
Black Hills State	2	–	3	–	0	3	–	6	–	0
Sioux Falls	2	–	3	–	0	3	–	7	–	0
Dakota State	1	–	4	–	0	1	–	9	–	0
$ – Conference champion; ^ – NAIA Division II playoff participant; Rankings from NAIA Division II poll

1986 Texas Intercollegiate Athletic Association football standings
	Conf.					Overall
Team	W		L		T	W		L		T
No. 8 Tarleton State $	6	–	0	–	0	9	–	1	–	1
Austin	2	–	4	–	0	6	–	4	–	0
McMurry	2	–	4	–	0	4	–	6	–	0
Sul Ross	2	–	4	–	0	3	–	6	–	0
$ – Conference champion; Rankings from NAIA Division II poll

1986 Wisconsin State University Conference football standings
	Conf.					Overall
Team	W		L		T	W		L		T
No. 2 Wisconsin–La Crosse +*	7	–	1	–	0	10	–	2	–	0
Wisconsin–River Falls +	7	–	1	–	0	8	–	2	–	0
No. T–15 Wisconsin–Stevens Point +^	7	–	1	–	0	8	–	4	–	0
Wisconsin–Whitewater	4	–	3	–	1	6	–	3	–	1
Wisconsin–Platteville	3	–	5	–	0	6	–	5	–	0
Wisconsin–Eau Claire	3	–	5	–	0	4	–	6	–	0
Wisconsin–Stout	2	–	5	–	1	2	–	8	–	1
Wisconsin–Oshkosh	2	–	6	–	0	4	–	6	–	0
Wisconsin–Superior	0	–	8	–	0	1	–	9	–	0
+ – Conference co-champions; ^ – NCAA Division III playoff participant; * – NAIA Division II playoff participant; Rankings from NAIA Division II poll for Wisconsin–La Crosse and NCAA Division III poll for Wisconsin–Stevens Point

1986 NAIA Division II independents football records
	Conf.			Overall
Team	W	L	T	W		L		T
No. 9 Hanover		–		8	–	1	–	0
No. 16 Northwestern (IA)		–		8	–	2	–	0
No. 19 Oklahoma Panhandle State		–		7	–	2	–	0
No. 11 Benedictine (KS)		–		7	–	3	–	0
No. 18 Union (KY)		–		7	–	3	–	0
Bluffton		–		6	–	3	–	0
No. 17 Westminster (PA)		–		6	–	3	–	0
No. 20 Wilmington (OH)		–		6	–	3	–	0
Westmar		–		6	–	3	–	1
Evangel		–		6	–	4	–	0
St. Ambrose		–		6	–	4	–	0
St. Francis (IL)		–		6	–	4	–	0
Findlay		–		5	–	4	–	0
Geneva		–		4	–	6	–	0
Waynesburg		–		4	–	6	–	0
Chadron State		–		3	–	6	–	0
Cumberland (KY)		–		3	–	7	–	0
Iowa Wesleyan		–		3	–	7	–	0
Peru State		–		3	–	7	–	0
Tiffin		–		2	–	8	–	0
Azusa Pacific		–		0	–	7	–	2
Texas Lutheran		–		1	–	9	–	0
Azusa Pacific forfeited 5 wins; Rankings from NAIA Division II poll

== Conference champions ==
Conference	Champion	Record
Columbia	Northern Division: Pacific Lutheran; Southern Division: Linfield	6–0; 6–0
Frontier	Carroll (MT)	6–0
Heart of America	Baker	6–0
Illini-Badger	Lakeland	5–0
Kansas	Bethany	8–1
Nebraska	Nebraska Wesleyan	5–0
North Dakota	Dickinson State	5–0
South Dakota	Huron (SD)	5–0
Texas	Tarleton State	6–0
WSUC	Wisconsin–La Crosse; Wisconsin–River Falls; Wisconsin–Stevens Point	7–1

== Postseason ==
Quarterfinals; Campus sites
Wisconsin–La Crosse	35
Hanover*	33
Huron (SD)	20
Baker*	49
Carroll (MT)	21
Dickinson State*	16
Linfield (OT)	27
Pacific Lutheran*	21

Semifinals; Campus sites
Wisconsin–La Crosse*	14
Baker	16
Carroll (MT)	7
Linfield*	53

Championship; McMinnville, OR
Baker	0
Linfield*	17

== See also ==
- 1986 NCAA Division I-A football season
- 1986 NCAA Division I-AA football season
- 1986 NCAA Division II football season
- 1986 NCAA Division III football season
