= 1982 Linfield Wildcats football team =

American college football season

1982 Linfield Wildcats football

NAIA Division II national champion NWC champion

NAIA Division II Championship Game, W 33–15 vs. William Jewell
- Conference: Northwest Conference
- Record: 12–0 (5–0 NWC)
- Head coach: Ad Rutschman (15th season)
- Home stadium: Maxwell Field

1982 Northwest Conference football standings
	Conf.					Overall
Team	W		L		T	W		L		T
No. 2 Linfield $^	5	–	0	–	0	12	–	0	–	0
No. 13 Pacific Lutheran	4	–	1	–	0	7	–	2	–	0
Whitworth	3	–	2	–	0	5	–	4	–	0
Pacific (OR)	2	–	3	–	0	2	–	7	–	0
Lewis & Clark	1	–	4	–	0	2	–	7	–	0
Willamette	0	–	5	–	0	1	–	8	–	0
$ – Conference champion; ^ – NAIA Division II playoff participant; Rankings from NAIA Division II poll

The 1982 Linfield Wildcats football team was an American football team that represented Linfield University as a member of the Northwest Conference (NWC) during the 1982 NAIA Division II football season. In their 15th season under head coach Ad Rutschman, the Wildcats compiled a perfect 12–0 record and won the NWC championship. They participated in the NAIA Division II playoffs, defeating Cal Lutheran (20–16) in the quarterfinals, Westminster (PA) (37–9) in the semifinals, and William Jewell (33–15) in the NAIA Division II Championship Game.

== Schedule ==
Date	Opponent	Site	Result	Attendance	Source
September 18	at Southern Oregon*	Ashland, OR	W 27–13		
September 25	Western Washington*	Maxwell Field; McMinnville, OR	W 41–21		
October 2	at Eastern Oregon*	La Grande, OR	W 30–20		
October 9	Oregon Tech*	Maxwell Field; McMinnville, OR	W 40–35		
October 16	Pacific (OR)	Maxwell Field; McMinnville, OR	W 41–0		
October 23	at Lewis & Clark	Portland, OR	W 20–16		
October 30	Willamette	Maxwell Field; McMinnville, OR	W 43–14		
November 6	at Whitworth	Spokane, WA	W 49–14		
November 13	Pacific Lutheran	Maxwell Field; McMinnville, OR	W 27–7		
November 20	Cal Lutheran*	Maxwell Field; McMinnville, OR (NAIA Division II quarterfinals)	W 20–16		
December 4	Westminster (PA)*	Maxwell Field; McMinnville, OR (NAIA Division II semifinals)	W 37–9	3,500	
December 11	William Jewell*	Wortman Stadium; McMinnville, OR (NAIA Division II Championship Game)	W 33–15	4,588	
*Non-conference game
