= 1966 NAIA World Series =

American college baseball tournament

1966 NAIA baseball tournament
- 1966 NAIA World Series
- Teams: 8
- Format: Double elimination
- Finals site: Phil Welch Stadium; St. Joseph, Missouri
- Champions: Linfield (1st title)
- MVP: Stuart Young (P) (Linfield)

The 1966 NAIA World Series was the tenth annual tournament hosted by the National Association of Intercollegiate Athletics to determine the national champion of baseball among its member colleges and universities in the United States and Canada.

The tournament was played at Phil Welch Stadium in St. Joseph, Missouri.

Linfield defeated Lewis (IL) in the championship series, 15–4, to win the Wildcats' first NAIA World Series.

Linfield pitcher Stuart Young was named tournament MVP.

== Bracket ==
First round	Second round	Semifinals	National Championship
Guilford	2
Linfield	4
Linfield	8
Lewis	2
Lewis (IL)	10
New Haven	6
Linfield	11
Southern	4
Missouri Valley	6
New Mexico Highlands	5
Missouri Valley	3
Southern	10
Omaha	7
Southern	9	Linfield	15	–
Lewis	4	–
Consolation first round	Consolation second round	Consolation third round	Consolation fourth round
Missouri Valley	2
Guilford	7	Guilford	3	Southern	6
New Haven	3	Guilford	6	Lewis	7
Lewis	8
Lewis	8
New Mexico Highlands	7	New Mexico Highlands	0
Omaha	3

== See also ==
- 1966 NCAA University Division baseball tournament
