= 1984 NAIA Division II football season =

American college football season

- Regular season: August–November 1984
- Postseason: November–December 1984
- National Championship: Maxwell Field; McMinnville, OR
- Champions: Linfield (2)

The 1984 NAIA Division II football season, as part of the 1984 college football season in the United States and the 29th season of college football sponsored by the NAIA, was the 15th season of play of the NAIA's lower division for football.

The season was played from August to November 1984 and culminated in the 1984 NAIA Division II Football National Championship, played at Maxwell Field on the campus of Linfield College in McMinnville, Oregon.

The Linfield Wildcats defeated the Northwestern Red Raiders, the defending national champions, in the championship game, 33–22, to win their second NAIA national title.

== Conference changes ==
=== Conference changes ===
- This was the final season of play for the Pacific Northwest Conference. The PNC's five football-playing members from Oregon and Washington would join the new, football-only Columbia Football League while the conference itself would rebrand as the Northwest Conference. Under this new name, the league would later re-sponsor football in 1996 before transitioning to NCAA Division III in 1998.

== Conference standings ==
1984 Frontier Conference football standings
| | Conf. | | | | | Overall |
| Team | W | | L | | T | W | | L | | T |
|---|---|---|---|---|---|---|---|---|---|---|
| No. 13 Rocky Mountain $ | 6 | – | 0 | – | 0 | 7 | – | 2 | – | 0 |
| Western Montana | 3 | – | 2 | – | 1 | 3 | – | 5 | – | 1 |
| Carroll (MT) | 2 | – | 3 | – | 1 | 3 | – | 5 | – | 1 |
| Montana Tech | 0 | – | 6 | – | 0 | 0 | – | 9 | – | 0 |
$ – Conference champion; Rankings from NAIA Division II poll

1984 Heart of America Athletic Conference football standings
| | Conf. | | | | | Overall |
| Team | W | | L | | T | W | | L | | T |
|---|---|---|---|---|---|---|---|---|---|---|
| No. 4 Baker $^ | 6 | – | 1 | – | 0 | 8 | – | 2 | – | 0 |
| No. 19 William Jewell | 5 | – | 2 | – | 0 | 7 | – | 2 | – | 1 |
| Missouri Valley | 5 | – | 2 | – | 0 | 6 | – | 4 | – | 0 |
| Graceland | 5 | – | 2 | – | 0 | 5 | – | 3 | – | 1 |
| MidAmerica Nazarene | 3 | – | 4 | – | 0 | 5 | – | 5 | – | 0 |
| Central Methodist | 2 | – | 5 | – | 0 | 4 | – | 6 | – | 0 |
| Culver–Stockton | 1 | – | 6 | – | 0 | 0 | – | 2 | – | 8 |
| Tarkio | 1 | – | 6 | – | 0 | 0 | – | 2 | – | 8 |
$ – Conference champion; ^ – NAIA Division II playoff participant; Rankings from NAIA Division II poll

1984 Hoosier–Buckeye Conference football standings
| | Conf. | | | | | Overall |
| Team | W | | L | | T | W | | L | | T |
|---|---|---|---|---|---|---|---|---|---|---|
| No. 7 Findlay $^ | 6 | – | 0 | – | 0 | 6 | – | 3 | – | 0 |
| No. 5 Hanover ^ | 4 | – | 1 | – | 1 | 8 | – | 2 | – | 1 |
| No. 18 Wilmington (OH) | 4 | – | 1 | – | 1 | 6 | – | 2 | – | 1 |
| Anderson (IN) | 2 | – | 3 | – | 1 | 2 | – | 5 | – | 2 |
| Manchester (IN) | 2 | – | 4 | – | 0 | 2 | – | 6 | – | 0 |
| Defiance | 1 | – | 4 | – | 1 | 4 | – | 4 | – | 1 |
| Bluffton | 0 | – | 6 | – | 0 | 2 | – | 7 | – | 0 |
$ – Conference champion; ^ – NAIA Division II playoff participant; Rankings from NAIA Division II poll

1984 Illini–Badger Football Conference standings
| | Conf. | | | | | Overall |
| Team | W | | L | | T | W | | L | | T |
|---|---|---|---|---|---|---|---|---|---|---|
| Northeastern Illinois $ | 3 | – | 1 | – | 0 | 7 | – | 2 | – | 1 |
| Concordia (WI) | 2 | – | 2 | – | 0 | 4 | – | 5 | – | 0 |
| Lakeland | 2 | – | 2 | – | 0 | 4 | – | 5 | – | 0 |
| Concordia (IL) | 2 | – | 2 | – | 0 | 3 | – | 5 | – | 0 |
| Eureka | 1 | – | 3 | – | 0 | 2 | – | 7 | – | 0 |
| Principia | 0 | – | 3 | – | 0 | 1 | – | 8 | – | 0 |
$ – Conference champion

1984 Kansas Collegiate Athletic Conference football standings
| | Conf. | | | | | Overall |
| Team | W | | L | | T | W | | L | | T |
|---|---|---|---|---|---|---|---|---|---|---|
| No. 3 Bethel (KS) $^ | 9 | – | 0 | – | 0 | 9 | – | 1 | – | 0 |
| No. 8 Southwestern (KS) ^ | 8 | – | 1 | – | 0 | 9 | – | 3 | – | 0 |
| Sterling | 6 | – | 3 | – | 0 | 6 | – | 3 | – | 0 |
| Bethany (KS) | 5 | – | 4 | – | 0 | 6 | – | 4 | – | 0 |
| Ottawa | 5 | – | 4 | – | 0 | 5 | – | 5 | – | 0 |
| Friends | 4 | – | 5 | – | 0 | 4 | – | 6 | – | 0 |
| St. Mary of the Plains | 4 | – | 5 | – | 0 | 4 | – | 6 | – | 0 |
| Tabor | 3 | – | 6 | – | 0 | 3 | – | 7 | – | 0 |
| McPherson | 1 | – | 8 | – | 0 | 1 | – | 8 | – | 0 |
| Kansas Wesleyan | 0 | – | 9 | – | 0 | 0 | – | 10 | – | 0 |
$ – Conference champion; ^ – NAIA Division II playoff participant; Rankings from NAIA Division II poll

1984 Nebraska Intercollegiate Athletic Conference football standings
| | Conf. | | | | | Overall |
| Team | W | | L | | T | W | | L | | T |
|---|---|---|---|---|---|---|---|---|---|---|
| Doane + | 4 | – | 1 | – | 0 | 6 | – | 4 | – | 0 |
| Hastings + | 4 | – | 1 | – | 0 | 6 | – | 4 | – | 0 |
| Nebraska Wesleyan | 3 | – | 2 | – | 0 | 6 | – | 4 | – | 0 |
| Concordia (NE) | 2 | – | 3 | – | 0 | 5 | – | 5 | – | 0 |
| Dana | 1 | – | 4 | – | 0 | 3 | – | 6 | – | 0 |
| Midland | 1 | – | 4 | – | 0 | 3 | – | 7 | – | 0 |
+ – Conference co-champions

1984 North Dakota College Athletic Conference football standings
| | Conf. | | | | | Overall |
| Team | W | | L | | T | W | | L | | T |
|---|---|---|---|---|---|---|---|---|---|---|
| No. 9 Jamestown + | 5 | – | 1 | – | 0 | 8 | – | 1 | – | 0 |
| Valley City State + | 5 | – | 1 | – | 0 | 5 | – | 4 | – | 0 |
| Minot State | 4 | – | 2 | – | 0 | 6 | – | 2 | – | 1 |
| Dickinson State | 4 | – | 2 | – | 0 | 6 | – | 3 | – | 0 |
| NDSCS–Wahpeton | 2 | – | 4 | – | 0 | ? | – | ? | – | ? |
| Mayville State | 1 | – | 5 | – | 0 | 4 | – | 5 | – | 0 |
| Bismarck JC | 0 | – | 6 | – | 0 | 1 | – | 7 | – | 0 |
+ – Conference co-champions; Rankings from NAIA Division II poll

1984 Northwest Conference football standings
| | Conf. | | | | | Overall |
| Team | W | | L | | T | W | | L | | T |
|---|---|---|---|---|---|---|---|---|---|---|
| No. 1 Linfield $^ | 4 | – | 0 | – | 0 | 12 | – | 0 | – | 0 |
| Pacific Lutheran | 3 | – | 1 | – | 0 | 6 | – | 3 | – | 0 |
| Lewis & Clark | 1 | – | 3 | – | 0 | 3 | – | 6 | – | 0 |
| Willamette | 1 | – | 3 | – | 0 | 2 | – | 5 | – | 2 |
| Pacific (OR) | 1 | – | 3 | – | 0 | 2 | – | 6 | – | 1 |
$ – Conference champion; ^ – NAIA Division II playoff participant; Rankings from NAIA Division II poll

1984 South Dakota Intercollegiate Conference football standings
| | Conf. | | | | | Overall |
| Team | W | | L | | T | W | | L | | T |
|---|---|---|---|---|---|---|---|---|---|---|
| No. 12 Sioux Falls + | 5 | – | 1 | – | 0 | 9 | – | 1 | – | 0 |
| No. 17 Black Hills State + | 5 | – | 1 | – | 0 | 8 | – | 2 | – | 0 |
| No. 14 South Dakota Tech + | 5 | – | 1 | – | 0 | 7 | – | 2 | – | 0 |
| Yankton | 2 | – | 4 | – | 0 | 4 | – | 5 | – | 0 |
| Dakota State | 2 | – | 4 | – | 0 | 2 | – | 6 | – | 0 |
| Huron | 1 | – | 5 | – | 0 | 2 | – | 8 | – | 0 |
| Dakota Wesleyan | 1 | – | 5 | – | 0 | 1 | – | 9 | – | 0 |
+ – Conference co-champions; Rankings from NAIA Division II poll

1984 Texas Intercollegiate Athletic Association football standings
| | Conf. | | | | | Overall |
| Team | W | | L | | T | W | | L | | T |
|---|---|---|---|---|---|---|---|---|---|---|
| Austin $ | 4 | – | 1 | – | 1 | 5 | – | 4 | – | 1 |
| Tarleton State | 4 | – | 2 | – | 0 | 6 | – | 5 | – | 0 |
| McMurry | 2 | – | 4 | – | 0 | 3 | – | 7 | – | 0 |
| Sul Ross | 1 | – | 4 | – | 1 | 3 | – | 5 | – | 1 |
$ – Conference champion

1984 Wisconsin State University Conference football standings
| | Conf. | | | | | Overall |
| Team | W | | L | | T | W | | L | | T |
|---|---|---|---|---|---|---|---|---|---|---|
| Wisconsin–River Falls + | 7 | – | 1 | – | 0 | 8 | – | 2 | – | 0 |
| Wisconsin–Whitewater + | 7 | – | 1 | – | 0 | 8 | – | 3 | – | 0 |
| No. 10 Wisconsin–La Crosse | 6 | – | 2 | – | 0 | 8 | – | 2 | – | 0 |
| No. 11 Wisconsin–Eau Claire | 5 | – | 3 | – | 0 | 8 | – | 3 | – | 0 |
| Wisconsin–Stevens Point | 4 | – | 4 | – | 0 | 6 | – | 5 | – | 0 |
| Wisconsin–Platteville | 4 | – | 4 | – | 0 | 5 | – | 6 | – | 0 |
| Wisconsin–Oshkosh | 2 | – | 6 | – | 0 | 3 | – | 7 | – | 0 |
| Wisconsin–Stout | 1 | – | 7 | – | 0 | 2 | – | 9 | – | 0 |
| Wisconsin–Superior | 0 | – | 8 | – | 0 | 0 | – | 11 | – | 0 |
+ – Conference co-champions; Rankings from NAIA Division II poll

1984 NAIA Division II independents football records
| | Conf. | | | Overall |
| Team | W | L | T | W | | L | | T |
|---|---|---|---|---|---|---|---|---|
| No. 2 Northwestern (IA) ^ | | – | | 11 | – | 2 | – | 0 |
| No. 16 Oklahoma Panhandle State | | – | | 9 | – | 2 | – | 0 |
| No. 6 St. Ambrose ^ | | – | | 9 | – | 2 | – | 0 |
| No. 15 Iowa Wesleyan | | – | | 8 | – | 3 | – | 0 |
| Azusa Pacific | | – | | 7 | – | 3 | – | 0 |
| No. 20 Westminster (PA) | | – | | 5 | – | 2 | – | 1 |
| Texas Lutheran | | – | | 5 | – | 3 | – | 1 |
| Benedictine (KS) | | – | | 6 | – | 4 | – | 0 |
| Peru State | | – | | 6 | – | 4 | – | 0 |
| Evangel | | – | | 5 | – | 4 | – | 0 |
| Cal Lutheran | | – | | 5 | – | 4 | – | 1 |
| Loras | | – | | 5 | – | 5 | – | 0 |
| Geneva | | – | | 3 | – | 6 | – | 0 |
| Westmar | | – | | 3 | – | 7 | – | 1 |
| Chadron State | | – | | 2 | – | 7 | – | 1 |
| Waynesburg | | – | | 2 | – | 6 | – | 0 |
| Union (KY) | | – | | 1 | – | 6 | – | 0 |
^ – NAIA Division II playoff participant San Francisco State forfeited a win over Azusa Pacific.; Rankings from NAIA Division II poll

== Conference champions ==
| Conference | Champion | Record |
|---|---|---|
| Frontier | Rocky Mountain | 6–0 |
| Heart of America | Baker | 6–1 |
| Hoosier-Buckeye | Findlay | 6–0 |
| Kansas | Bethany | 9–0 |
| Nebraska | Doane; Hastings | 4–1 |
| North Dakota | Jamestown; Valley City State | 5–1 |
| Northwest | Linfield | 4–0 |
| South Dakota | Black Hills State; Sioux Falls; South Dakota Tech | 5–1 |
| Texas | Austin College | 4–1–1 |
| WSUC | Wisconsin–River Falls; Wisconsin–Whitewater | 7–1 |

== Postseason ==
Quarterfinals; Campus sites
Saint Ambrose | 0
Linfield* | 26
Hanover | 18
Findlay* | 17
Northwestern (IA) | 19
Baker | 2
Bethel (KS) | 14
Southwestern (KS)* (OT) | 17

Semifinals; Campus sites
Linfield* | 55
Hanover | 14
Northwestern (IA)* | 45
Southwestern (KS) | 23

Championship; McMinnville, OR
Linfield* | 33
Northwestern (IA) | 22

== See also ==
- 1984 NAIA Division I football season
- 1984 NCAA Division I-A football season
- 1984 NCAA Division I-AA football season
- 1984 NCAA Division II football season
- 1984 NCAA Division III football season
