= Linfield Wildcats football =

- First season: 1896
- Athletic director: Scott Brosius
- Head coach: Joseph Smith; 19th season, 173–33 (.840)
- Location: McMinnville, Oregon
- Stadium: Maxwell Field and Memorial Stadium
- NCAA division: Division III
- Conference: Northwest
- Colors: Purple and red

NCAA Division III championships
- 2004

NAIA national championships
- NAIA Division II: 1982, 1984, 1986
- Website: golinfieldwildcats.com

The Linfield Wildcats football team represents Linfield University, located in McMinnville, Oregon, in NCAA Division III college football.

The Wildcats, who began playing football in 1896, compete as members of the Northwest Conference.

The Linfield Wildcats football team has the longest streak of consecutive winning seasons across all levels of college football. As of 2026, the team has had 70 consecutive winning seasons.

== History ==
=== The Streak ===
The Wildcats' winning streak, referred to as "The Streak", at Linfield, began in 1956. The Linfield University Special Collections and Archives started an oral history video collection from members of the 1956 football team, which was made available to the public in October 2021.

=== Conferences ===
- Northwest Conference (1926–1984, 1996–present)
- Columbia Football League (1985–1987)
- Columbia Football Association (1988–1995)

== Championships ==
=== National championships ===
The Wildcats have won four national championships.

Year	Association	Division	Head coach	Record	Opponent	Result
1982	NAIA (3)	Division II (3)	Ad Rutschman	12–0 (5–0 NWC)	William Jewell	W, 33–15
1984	NAIA (3)	Division II (3)	Ad Rutschman	12–0 (4–0 NWC)	Northwestern (IA)	W, 33–22
1986	NAIA (3)	Division II (3)	Ad Rutschman	12–0 (6–0 CFL)	Baker	W, 17–0
2004	NCAA (1)	Division III (1)	Jay Locey	13–0 (5–0 NWC)	Mary Hardin–Baylor	W, 28–21

== Postseason appearances ==
=== NAIA playoffs ===
The Wildcats have made fifteen appearances in the NAIA playoffs, with a combined record of 16–12 and three national championship.

Year	Round	Opponent	Result
1961	Semifinals; National Championship	Whittier; Pittsburg State	W, 18–7; L, 7–12
1964	Semifinals	Concordia–Moorhead	L, 6–28
1965	Semifinals; National Championship	Sul Ross State; Saint John's (MN)	W, 30–27; L, 0–33
1974	Semifinals	Texas Lutheran	L, 8–52
1977	Semifinals	Cal Lutheran	L, 28–29
1978	Quarterfinals; Semifinals	Carroll (MT); Concordia–Moorhead	W, 32–6; L, 23–24
1980	Quarterfinals	Pacific Lutheran	L, 20–35
1982	Quarterfinals; Semifinals; National Championship	Cal Lutheran; Westminster (PA); William Jewell	W, 20–16; W, 37–9; W, 33–15
1984	Quarterfinals; Semifinals; National Championship	Saint Ambrose; Hanover; Northwestern (IA)	W, 26–0; W, 45–23; W, 33–22
1985	Quarterfinals	Pacific Lutheran	L, 12–30
1986	Quarterfinals; Semifinals; National Championship	Pacific Lutheran; Carroll (MT); Baker	W, 27–21 ^{OT} W, 53–7; W, 17–0
1991	First Round; Quarterfinals	Lewis & Clark; Pacific Lutheran	W, 59–30; L, 0–23
1992	First Round; Quarterfinals; Semifinals; National Championship	Western Washington; Pacific Lutheran; Minot State; Findlay	W, 26–0; W, 44–30; W, 47–12; L, 13–26
1993	First Round	Central Washington	L, 26–28
1994	First Round	Western Washington	L, 2–21

=== NCAA Division III playoffs ===
The Wildcats have made nineteen appearances in the NCAA Division III playoffs, with a combined record of 30–17 and one national championship.

Year	Round	Opponent	Result
2000	Second Round	Central (IA)	L, 17–20 ^{OT}
2002	Second Round; Quarterfinals	Wartburg; Saint John's (MN)	W, 52–15; L, 14–21
2003	First Round; Second Round; Quarterfinals	Redlands; Wartburg; Saint John's (MN)	W, 31–23; W, 23–20; L, 25–31
2004	Second Round; Quarterfinals; Semifinals; Stagg Bowl	Wisconsin–La Crosse; Occidental; Rowan; Mary Hardin–Baylor	W, 52–14; W, 56–27; W, 52–0; W, 28–21
2005	First Round; Second Round; Quarterfinals	Occidental; Concordia–Moorhead; Wisconsin–Whitewater	W, 63–21; W, 41–13; L, 41–44
2009	First Round; Second Round; Quarterfinals; Semifinals	Cal Lutheran; Mary Hardin–Baylor; St. Thomas (MN); Wisconsin–Whitewater	W, 38–17; W, 53–21; W, 31–20; L, 17–27
2010	First Round; Second Round	Cal Lutheran; St. Thomas (MN)	W, 42–26; L, 17–24 ^{2OT}
2011	First Round; Second Round	Cal Lutheran; Wesley (DE)	W, 30–27; L, 34–49
2012	First Round; Second Round; Quarterfinals	Pacific Lutheran; North Central (IL); Wisconsin–Oshkosh	W, 27–24; W, 30–14; L, 24–30 ^{OT}
2013	First Round; Second Round; Quarterfinals	Pacific Lutheran; Hampden–Sydney; Wisconsin–Whitewater	W, 42–21; W, 31–21; L, 17–28
2014	First Round; Second Round; Quarterfinals; Semifinals	Chapman; Mary Hardin–Baylor; Widener; Wisconsin–Whitewater	W, 55–24; W, 31–28; W, 45–7; L, 14–20
2015	First Round; Second Round; Quarterfinals; Semifinals	Whitworth; Cortland; Mary Hardin–Baylor; St. Thomas (MN)	W, 48–10; W, 38–22; W, 38–35; L, 17–38
2016	First Round; Second Round	Hardin–Simmons; Mary Hardin–Baylor	W, 24–10; L, 10–27
2017	First Round; Second Round	Hardin–Simmons; Mary Hardin–Baylor	W, 27–13; L, 0–24
2019	First Round	Chapman	L, 65–68 ^{3OT}
2021	First Round; Second Round; Quarterfinals	Redlands; Saint John's; Mary Hardin–Baylor	W, 44–10; W, 31–28; L, 24–49
2022	First Round; Second Round	Pomona–Pitzer; Bethel (MN)	W, 51–24; L, 24–27
2024	Second Round; Third Round	Texas Lutheran; Mary Hardin–Baylor	W, 65–3; L, 18–28
2026	Second Round	Concordia Wisconsin	TBP
