= Columbia Football League =

US intercollegiate athletic football conference

The Columbia Football League was a short-lived NAIA intercollegiate athletic football conference that existed during the 1985 through 1987 seasons and was composed of member schools from the states of Oregon and Washington. The league's teams were divided into two divisions based on geography, the Northern and Southern Divisions.

== Champions ==
=== Northern Division ===
- 1985 – Pacific Lutheran
- 1986 – Pacific Lutheran
- 1987 – Central Washington

=== Southern Division ===
- 1985 – Linfield
- 1986 – Linfield
- 1987 – Oregon Tech

== Standings ==
1985 Columbia Football League standings
	Conf.					Overall
Team	W		L		T	W		L		T
Northern Division
No. 3 Pacific Lutheran x^	6	–	0	–	0	10	–	1	–	1
No. 15 Puget Sound	4	–	2	–	0	7	–	2	–	0
Central Washington	3	–	3	–	0	5	–	4	–	0
Simon Fraser	3	–	3	–	0	4	–	5	–	0
Whitworth	3	–	3	–	0	3	–	6	–	0
Western Washington	1	–	4	–	1	2	–	6	–	1
Eastern Oregon	0	–	5	–	1	0	–	8	–	2
Southern Division
No. 5 Linfield x^	6	–	0	–	0	8	–	2	–	0
No. 8 Western Oregon *	5	–	1	–	0	8	–	2	–	0
Willamette	4	–	2	–	0	6	–	2	–	1
Southern Oregon	2	–	3	–	0	2	–	6	–	1
Oregon Tech	1	–	4	–	0	1	–	7	–	0
Lewis & Clark	1	–	5	–	0	3	–	6	–	0
Pacific (OR)	1	–	5	–	0	2	–	7	–	0
x – Division champion/co-champions; * – NAIA Division I playoff participant ^ – NAIA Division II playoff participant; Rankings from NAIA Division I poll for Puget Sound and Western Oregon and NAIA Division II poll for Pacific Lutheran and Linfield

1986 Columbia Football League standings
	Conf.					Overall
Team	W		L		T	W		L		T
Northern Division
No. 5 Pacific Lutheran x^	6	–	0	–	0	8	–	1	–	0
No. 19 Central Washington	4	–	2	–	0	6	–	3	–	0
Puget Sound	4	–	2	–	0	6	–	3	–	0
No. 18 Simon Fraser	4	–	2	–	0	6	–	3	–	0
Whitworth	1	–	4	–	1	2	–	6	–	1
Western Washington	1	–	5	–	0	2	–	7	–	0
Eastern Oregon	0	–	5	–	1	0	–	8	–	1
Southern Division
No. 1 Linfield x^	6	–	0	–	0	12	–	0	–	0
No. 13 Western Oregon	5	–	1	–	0	7	–	2	–	0
Oregon Tech	4	–	2	–	0	5	–	4	–	0
Southern Oregon	2	–	4	–	0	4	–	5	–	0
Willamette	2	–	4	–	0	4	–	5	–	0
Pacific (OR)	1	–	5	–	0	2	–	7	–	0
Lewis & Clark	1	–	5	–	0	1	–	8	–	0
x – Division champion/co-champions; ^ – NAIA Division II playoff participant; Rankings from NAIA Division I poll for Central Washington, Simon Fraser, and Western Oregon and NAIA Division II poll for Pacific Lutheran and Linfield

1987 Columbia Football League standings
	Conf.					Overall
Team	W		L		T	W		L		T
Northern Division
No. 8 Central Washington * x	5	–	1	–	0	7	–	3	–	0
No. 6 Pacific Lutheran ^	4	–	1	–	1	11	–	1	–	1
No. 17 Puget Sound	4	–	2	–	0	6	–	3	–	0
Simon Fraser	4	–	2	–	0	4	–	6	–	0
Western Washington	2	–	3	–	1	4	–	3	–	2
Whitworth	1	–	5	–	0	3	–	6	–	0
Lewis & Clark	0	–	6	–	0	0	–	9	–	0
Southern Division
Oregon Tech x	5	–	1	–	0	5	–	4	–	0
No. 15 Southern Oregon *	4	–	2	–	0	7	–	4	–	0
Linfield	4	–	2	–	0	5	–	4	–	0
Pacific (OR)	3	–	2	–	1	4	–	3	–	2
Western Oregon	3	–	3	–	0	5	–	4	–	0
Willamette	1	–	4	–	1	3	–	5	–	1
Eastern Oregon	0	–	6	–	0	1	–	8	–	0
x – Division champion/co-champions; * – NAIA Division I playoff participant ^ – NAIA Division II playoff participant; Rankings from NAIA Division I poll for Central Washington, Puget Sound, and Southern Oregon and NAIA Division II poll for Pacific Lutheran

== See also ==
- Evergreen Conference
- Columbia Football Association
- List of defunct college football conferences
