= 1980 NAIA Division II football season =

American college football season

- Regular season: August–November 1980
- Postseason: November–December 1980
- National Championship: Lincoln Bowl; Tacoma, WA
- Champions: Pacific Lutheran

The 1980 NAIA Division II football season, as part of the 1980 college football season in the United States and the 25th season of college football sponsored by the NAIA, was the 11th season of play of the NAIA's lower division for football.

The season was played from August to November 1980 and culminated in the 1980 NAIA Division II Football National Championship, played at the Lincoln Bowl in Tacoma, Washington.

The Pacific Lutheran Lutes defeated the Wilmington Quakers) in the championship game, 38–10, to win their first NAIA national title.

== Conference realignment ==
=== Conference changes ===
- This was the final season for the Tri-State Conference. Its three remaining members, from Iowa and South Dakota, would all become independents.

== Conference standings ==
1980 College Conference of Illinois and Wisconsin football standings
	Conf.					Overall
Team	W		L		T	W		L		T
Elmhurst +	6	–	2	–	0	7	–	2	–	0
No. 17 Illinois Wesleyan +	6	–	2	–	0	7	–	2	–	0
Augustana (IL)	5	–	3	–	0	6	–	3	–	0
Carthage	5	–	3	–	0	6	–	3	–	0
Millikin	5	–	3	–	0	6	–	3	–	0
North Central (IL)	5	–	3	–	0	6	–	3	–	0
North Park	2	–	6	–	0	3	–	6	–	0
Wheaton (IL)	1	–	7	–	0	2	–	7	–	0
Carroll (WI)	1	–	7	–	0	1	–	8	–	0
+ – Conference co-champions; Rankings from NAIA Division II poll

1980 Frontier Conference football standings
	Conf.					Overall
Team	W		L		T	W		L		T
Carroll (MT) +	4	–	2	–	0	6	–	4	–	0
Western Montana +	4	–	2	–	0	4	–	5	–	0
Montana Tech	3	–	3	–	0	4	–	6	–	0
Rocky Mountain	1	–	5	–	0	1	–	7	–	0
+ – Conference co-champions

1980 Heart of America Athletic Conference football standings
	Conf.					Overall
Team	W		L		T	W		L		T
No. 4 William Jewell +^	7	–	0	–	1	11	–	1	–	1
No. 7 Baker +^	7	–	0	–	1	9	–	1	–	1
Graceland	5	–	3	–	0	6	–	3	–	0
Missouri Valley	5	–	3	–	0	7	–	4	–	0
Ottawa	4	–	4	–	0	7	–	4	–	0
Culver–Stockton	3	–	5	–	0	4	–	6	–	0
MidAmerica Nazarene	2	–	6	–	0	4	–	7	–	0
Central Methodist	2	–	6	–	0	2	–	8	–	0
Tarkio	0	–	8	–	0	0	–	10	–	0
+ – Conference co-champions; ^ – NAIA Division II playoff participant; Rankings from NAIA Division II poll

1980 Hoosier–Buckeye Conference football standings
	Conf.					Overall
Team	W		L		T	W		L		T
No. 9 Anderson (IN) +	7	–	1	–	0	8	–	1	–	0
No. 2 Wilmington (OH) +^	7	–	1	–	0	10	–	2	–	0
No. 5 Hanover +^	7	–	1	–	0	8	–	2	–	0
Findlay	5	–	3	–	0	5	–	4	–	0
Defiance	4	–	4	–	0	4	–	5	–	0
Earlham	2	–	6	–	0	3	–	6	–	0
Bluffton	2	–	6	–	0	2	–	6	–	1
Taylor	2	–	6	–	0	2	–	7	–	0
Manchester (IN)	0	–	8	–	0	0	–	9	–	0
+ – Conference co-champions; ^ – NAIA Division II playoff participant; Rankings from NAIA Division II poll

1980 Illini–Badger Football Conference standings
	Conf.					Overall
Team	W		L		T	W		L		T
Milton $	4	–	0	–	1	5	–	3	–	1
Concordia (IL)	3	–	2	–	0	3	–	6	–	0
Northeastern Illinois	3	–	2	–	0	3	–	6	–	0
Eureka	2	–	2	–	1	3	–	5	–	1
Lakeland	2	–	3	–	0	4	–	6	–	0
Concordia (WI)	1	–	4	–	0	2	–	7	–	0
$ – Conference champion

1980 Kansas Collegiate Athletic Conference football standings
	Conf.					Overall
Team	W		L		T	W		L		T
No. 12 Bethany (KS) $	7	–	1	–	0	9	–	1	–	0
Kansas Wesleyan	6	–	2	–	0	6	–	4	–	0
St. Mary of the Plains	6	–	2	–	0	6	–	4	–	0
Southwestern (KS)	4	–	4	–	0	4	–	5	–	0
Bethel (KS)	3	–	4	–	1	3	–	5	–	1
Friends	3	–	5	–	0	4	–	5	–	0
Sterling	2	–	5	–	1	2	–	6	–	1
McPherson	2	–	6	–	0	2	–	7	–	0
Tabor	2	–	6	–	0	2	–	7	–	0
$ – Conference champion; Rankings from NAIA Division II poll

1980 Minnesota Intercollegiate Athletic Conference football standings
	Conf.					Overall
Team	W		L		T	W		L		T
Concordia–Moorhead $	7	–	1	–	0	8	–	2	–	0
No.16 Gustavus Adolphus	6	–	2	–	0	7	–	3	–	0
Saint John's (MN)	5	–	3	–	0	5	–	3	–	0
Hamline	5	–	3	–	0	5	–	4	–	0
St. Olaf	4	–	4	–	0	6	–	4	–	0
Augsburg	4	–	4	–	0	5	–	5	–	0
St. Thomas (MN)	2	–	5	–	1	3	–	6	–	1
Bethel (MN)	2	–	6	–	0	2	–	8	–	0
Macalester	0	–	7	–	1	1	–	7	–	1
$ – Conference champion; Rankings from NAIA Division II poll

1980 Nebraska Intercollegiate Athletic Conference football standings
	Conf.					Overall
Team	W		L		T	W		L		T
No. 13 Hastings $	4	–	1	–	0	8	–	1	–	0
Midland	3	–	2	–	0	5	–	4	–	0
Concordia (NE)	3	–	2	–	0	5	–	5	–	0
Doane	3	–	2	–	0	4	–	6	–	0
Nebraska Wesleyan	2	–	3	–	0	3	–	6	–	0
Dana	0	–	5	–	0	0	–	9	–	0
$ – Conference champion; Hastings and Doane played twice; each game counted as ½ of a game in the conference standings.; Rankings from NAIA Division II poll

1980 North Dakota College Athletic Conference football standings
	Conf.					Overall
Team	W		L		T	W		L		T
No. 6 Valley City State $^	6	–	0	–	0	10	–	1	–	0
No. 18 Dickinson State	4	–	2	–	0	7	–	2	–	0
Jamestown	4	–	2	–	0	6	–	3	–	0
Mayville State	3	–	3	–	0	6	–	3	–	0
Minot State	3	–	3	–	0	5	–	4	–	0
North Dakota Science	1	–	5	–	0	2	–	7	–	0
Bismarck JC	0	–	6	–	0	2	–	5	–	0
$ – Conference champion; ^ – NAIA Division II playoff participant; Rankings from NAIA Division II poll

1980 Northwest Conference football standings
	Conf.					Overall
Team	W		L		T	W		L		T
No. 3 Linfield $^	5	–	0	–	0	9	–	1	–	0
No. 1 Pacific Lutheran ^	4	–	1	–	0	11	–	1	–	0
Willamette	2	–	2	–	1	3	–	4	–	1
Whitworth	2	–	3	–	0	2	–	7	–	0
Lewis & Clark	1	–	3	–	1	4	–	4	–	1
Pacific (OR)	0	–	5	–	0	0	–	9	–	0
$ – Conference champion; ^ – NAIA Division II playoff participant Whitworth forfeited two games; Rankings from NAIA Division II poll

1980 South Dakota Intercollegiate Conference football standings
	Conf.					Overall
Team	W		L		T	W		L		T
No. 11 South Dakota Tech $	6	–	0	–	0	8	–	1	–	0
Black Hills State	5	–	1	–	0	5	–	4	–	0
Sioux Falls	4	–	2	–	0	5	–	5	–	0
Dakota State	3	–	3	–	0	5	–	4	–	0
Huron	2	–	5	–	0	3	–	7	–	0
South Dakota–Springfield	1	–	5	–	0	2	–	8	–	0
Dakota Wesleyan	0	–	6	–	0	1	–	8	–	0
$ – Conference champion; Rankings from NAIA Division II poll

1980 Southern California Intercollegiate Athletic Conference football standings
	Conf.					Overall
Team	W		L		T	W		L		T
Redlands $	5	–	0	–	0	6	–	4	–	0
Claremont-Mudd	4	–	1	–	0	6	–	3	–	0
Whittier	3	–	2	–	0	5	–	5	–	0
Occidental	2	–	3	–	0	4	–	6	–	0
La Verne	1	–	4	–	0	2	–	8	–	0
Pomona-Pitzer	0	–	5	–	0	0	–	9	–	0
$ – Conference champion

1980 Texas Intercollegiate Athletic Association football standings
	Conf.					Overall
Team	W		L		T	W		L		T
No. 8 McMurry $^	9	–	1	–	0	9	–	2	–	0
No. 15 Austin	8	–	2	–	0	8	–	2	–	0
Sul Ross	6	–	4	–	0	6	–	4	–	0
Trinity (TX)	4	–	6	–	0	4	–	6	–	0
Tarleton State	3	–	7	–	0	3	–	7	–	0
Lubbock Christian	0	–	10	–	0	0	–	10	–	0
$ – Conference champion; ^ – NAIA Division II playoff participant; Rankings from NAIA Division II poll

1980 Tri-State Conference football standings
	Conf.					Overall
Team	W		L		T	W		L		T
Northwestern (IA)	2	–	0	–	0	6	–	3	–	0
Westmar	1	–	1	–	0	7	–	3	–	0
Yankton	0	–	2	–	0	3	–	7	–	0
$ – Conference champion

1980 NAIA Division II independents football records
	Conf.			Overall
Team	W	L	T	W		L		T
No. 10 Peru State		–		9	–	1	–	0
No. 20 Azusa Pacific		–		8	–	2	–	0
No. 14 Cal Lutheran		–		7	–	2	–	1
No. 19 Oklahoma Panhandle State		–		7	–	3	–	0
Waynesburg		–		5	–	3	–	0
Westminster (PA)		–		5	–	3	–	0
Simon Fraser		–		5	–	4	–	0
Chadron State		–		5	–	5	–	0
Loras		–		5	–	5	–	0
Geneva		–		4	–	5	–	0
Iowa Wesleyan		–		4	–	6	–	0
Texas Lutheran		–		4	–	6	–	0
Benedictine (KS)		–		3	–	7	–	0
Rankings from NAIA Division II poll

== Conference champions ==
Conference	Champion	Record
Frontier	Carroll (MT); Montana Western	4–2
Heart of America	William Jewell; Baker (KS)	7–0–1
Hoosier-Buckeye	Anderson (IN); Hanover; Wilmington (OH)	7–1
Kansas	Bethany	7–1
Minnesota	Concordia–Moorhead	7–1
Nebraska	Hastings	4–1
North Dakota	Valley City State	4–0
Northwest	Linfield	5–0
South Dakota	South Dakota Tech	6–0
Texas	McMurry	9–1

== Postseason ==
Quarterfinals; Campus sites
Linfield	20
Pacific Lutheran*	35
Valley City State	16
McMurry (TX)*	7
Baker	17
William Jewell*	20
Hanover	49
Wilmington (OH)* (4OT)	56

Semifinals; Campus sites
Pacific Lutheran*	32
Valley City State	0
William Jewell*	17
Wilmington (OH)	31

Championship; Tacoma, WA
Pacific Lutheran*	38
Wilmington (OH)	10

== See also ==
- 1980 NAIA Division I football season
- 1980 NCAA Division I-A football season
- 1980 NCAA Division I-AA football season
- 1980 NCAA Division II football season
- 1980 NCAA Division III football season
