= Northwest Conference =

College athletic conference in the US

- Association: NCAA
- Founded: December 12, 1925
- Commissioner: Shana Levine
- Sports fielded: 20; men's: 9; women's: 11
- Division: Division III
- No. of teams: 9
- Headquarters: Hillsboro, Oregon
- Region: Pacific Northwest
- Website: nwcsports.com

Locations
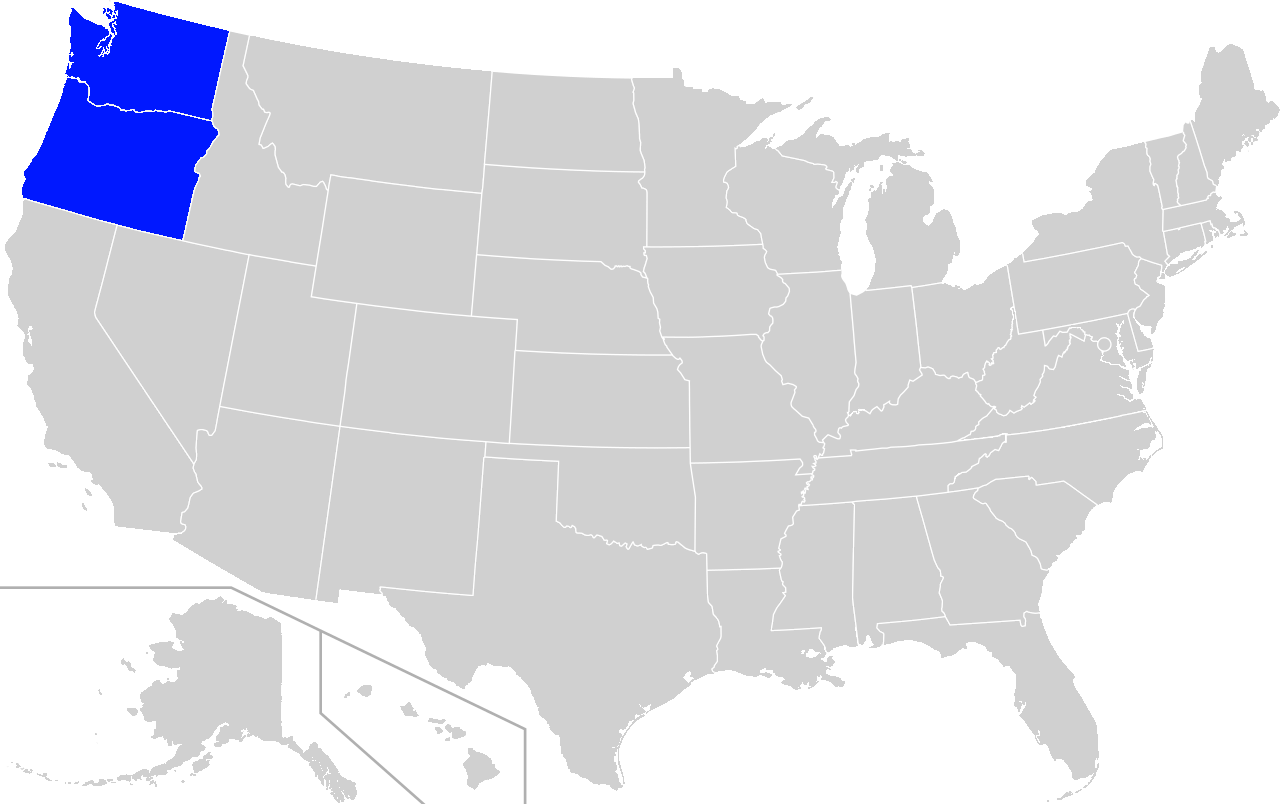

The Northwest Conference (NWC) is an intercollegiate athletic conference which competes in the NCAA's Division III. Member teams are located in the states of Oregon and Washington. It was known as the Pacific Northwest Conference from 1925 to 1984.

== History ==
Northwest Conference

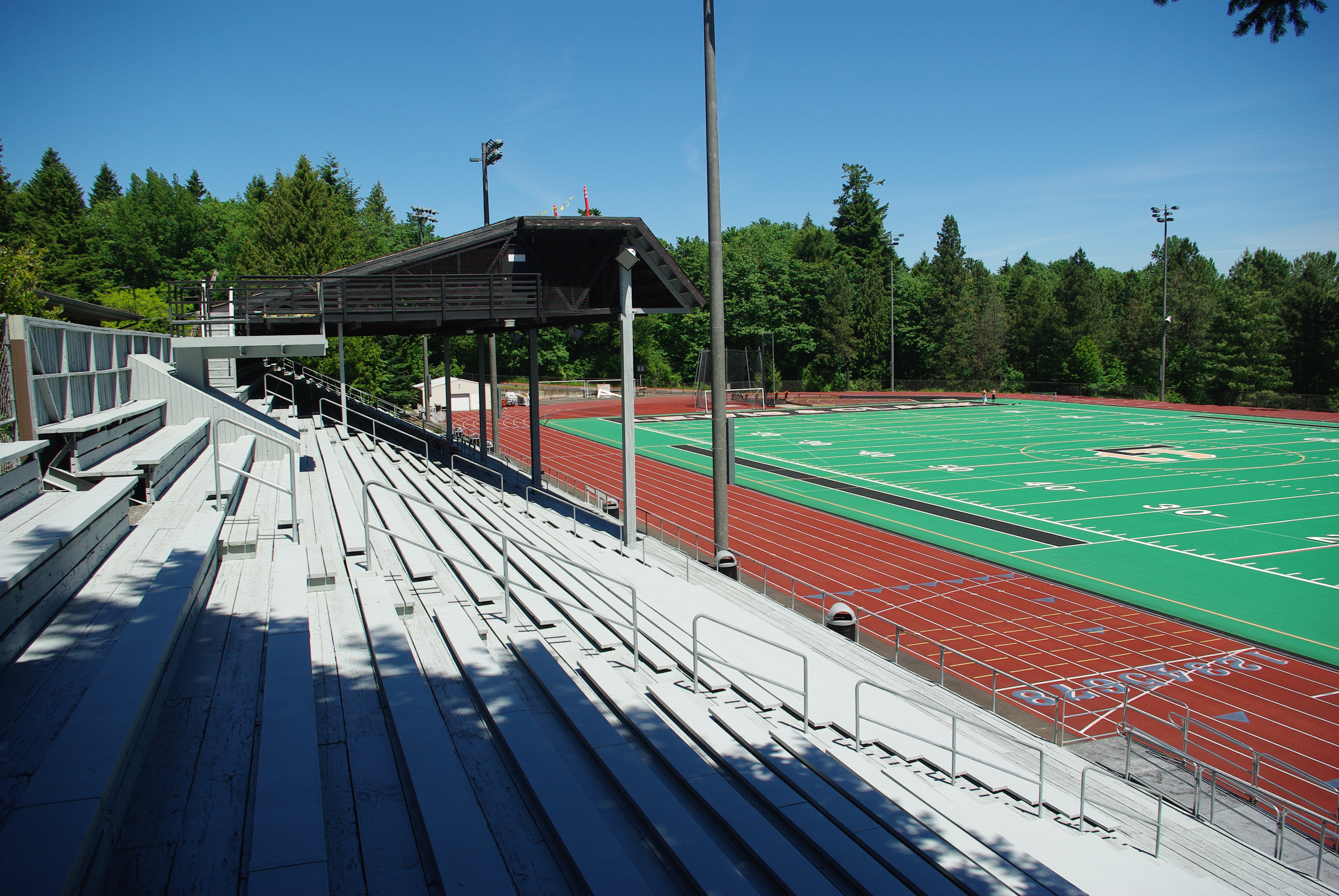
Griswold Stadium at Lewis & Clark

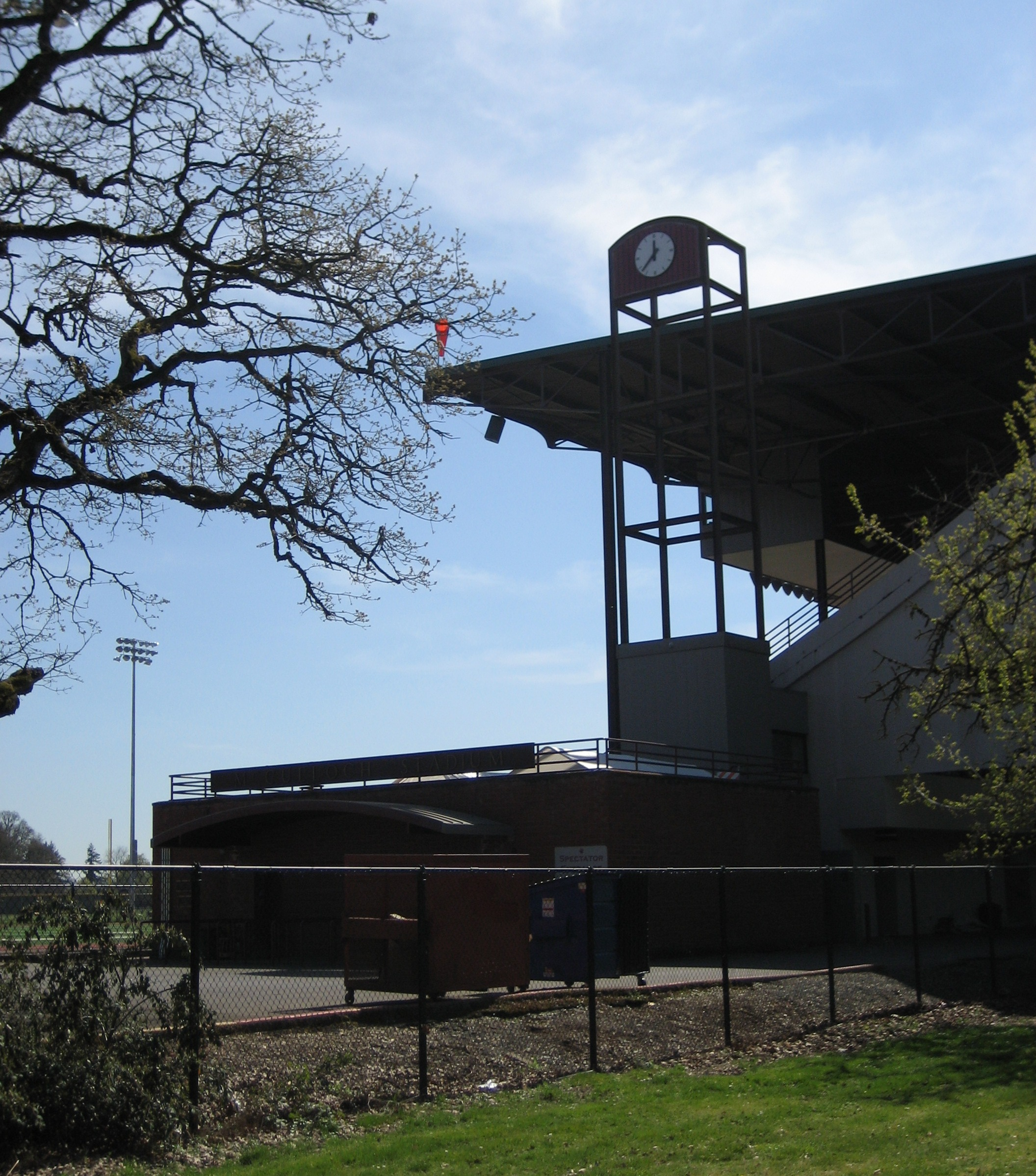
McCulloch Stadium at Willamette

The original Northwest Conference was formed on February 8, 1908 when Whitman College invited the other leading educational institutions of the Northwest to form an athletic conference. The resulting conference placed small, private Whitman College alongside the five large, public, state universities of and agricultural colleges of Washington, Oregon, and Idaho.

In 1915, Washington, Oregon, and Oregon Agricultural joined with California to form the Pacific Coast Conference but continued to hold dual-membership in the Northwest Conference. Over the next several years, the PCC added more large schools from the Northwest and California. The Northwest Conference likewise expanded by adding Montana, Willamette, Pacific, and Gonzaga.

This two-conference situation lasted until December 1925. At the annual dual meeting of the Northwest Conference and Pacific Coast Conference schools, the large colleges and universities announced they would continue solely in the PCC. At the same time, the smaller colleges announced that they had already organized into a new conference, adding members and retaining the name and eligibility requirements of the prior Northwest Conference. Officials of both conferences "emphasized the fact that the move was entirely harmonious and for mutual advantage." Only Gonzaga was left without a conference.

The charter members of the new Northwest Conference included Willamette University, Pacific University, Whitman College, the College of Puget Sound (now the University of Puget Sound), Linfield College (now Linfield University), and the College of Idaho. In 1931, Albany College joined, left in 1938, and re-joined in 1949 using its present name of Lewis & Clark College. Pacific Lutheran University was added in 1965, and Whitworth University in 1970. In 1978, the College of Idaho dropped out of the conference. Whitworth also left in 1984, but then returned in 1988. In 1996, George Fox University joined when the conference moved to the NCAA and Puget Sound re-joined in that same year since 1948. From 2006 to 2010, Menlo College was also a part of the conference as an associate member in football.

For 60 years, the NWC sponsored sports exclusively for men, but in 1984 it joined with the Women's Conference of Independent Colleges to become the Northwest Conference of Independent Colleges, shortening the name to its current moniker in 1996 when it joined the NCAA.

The College of Idaho reinstated its football program in 2014 after a 37-year hiatus and joined the Frontier Conference for football. College of Idaho is now a member of the NAIA's Cascade Collegiate Conference for other sports. Whitworth left the NWC in 1984 but returned in 1988. George Fox University and Seattle University joined the conference in 1997. Seattle dropped out again in 1999 to become members of NCAA Division II. Menlo College joined the conference in 2005 as a football-only member.

=== Chronological timeline ===
- 1925 – The NWC was founded as the Pacific Northwest Conference (PNWC). Charter members include the College of Idaho, Linfield College, Pacific University, the College of Puget Sound, Whitman College and Willamette University, beginning the 1925–26 academic year.
- 1931 – Albany College (now Lewis & Clark College) joined the PNWC in the 1931–32 academic year.
- 1938 – Lewis & Clark left the PNWC after the 1937–38 academic year.
- 1948 – Puget Sound left the PNWC after the 1947–48 academic year.
- 1949 – Lewis & Clark rejoined the PNWC in the 1949–50 academic year.
- 1965 – Pacific Lutheran College (now Pacific Lutheran University) joined the PNWC in the 1965–66 academic year.
- 1970 – Whitworth College (now Whitworth University) joined the PNWC in the 1970–71 academic year.
- 1978 – The College of Idaho left the PNWC after the 1977–78 academic year.
- 1984:
  - Whitworth left the PNWC after the 1983–84 academic year.
  - The PNWC merged with the Women's Conference of Independent Colleges (WCIC) to become the Northwest Conference of Independent Colleges (NCIC), therefore adding women's sports in the conference, beginning the 1984–85 academic year.
- 1988 – Whitworth rejoined the NCIC in the 1988–89 academic year.
- 1995 – George Fox College (now George Fox University) joined the NCIC in the 1995–96 academic year.
- 1996:
  - Puget Sound rejoined the NCIC in the 1996–97 academic year.
  - The NCIC has rebranded its name to become the Northwest Conference (NWC), beginning the 1996–97 academic year.
  - The NWC has joined full membership in the Division III ranks of the National Collegiate Athletic Association (NCAA) after years spent in the National Association of Intercollegiate Athletics (NAIA), beginning the 1996–97 academic year.
- 1997 – Seattle University joined the NWC in the 1997–98 academic year.
- 1999 – Seattle left the NWC to join the NCAA Division II ranks and the Pacific West Conference (PacWest) after the 1998–99 academic year.
- 2006 – Menlo College joined the NWC as an associate member for football in the 2006 fall season (2006–07 academic year).
- 2011 – Menlo left the NWC as an associate member for football after the 2010 fall season (2010–11 academic year).
- 2017 – Mills College joined the NWC as an associate member for women's rowing for the 2018 spring season (2017–18 academic year)
- 2022 - Mills left the NWC as an associate member for women's rowing after the 2022 spring season (2021–22 academic year); as the school merged with Northeastern University and put their athletics programs on hold.

== Member schools ==
=== Current members ===
The NWC currently has nine full members, all are private schools:

| Institution | Location | Founded | Affiliation | Enrollment | Nickname | Joined (Note: Represents the calendar year when fall sports competition begins.) | Colors | Football? |
|---|---|---|---|---|---|---|---|---|
| George Fox University | Newberg, Oregon | 1885 | Quakers | 4,039 | Bruins | 1996 | | Yes |
| Lewis & Clark College | Portland, Oregon | 1867 | Nonsectarian | 2,205 | River Otters | 1931; 1949 (Note: Lewis & Clark left the NWC after the 1937–38 school year before rejoining in the 1949–50 school year.) | | Yes |
| Linfield University | McMinnville, Oregon | 1858 | Baptist | 1,755 | Wildcats | 1926 | | Yes |
| Pacific University | Forest Grove, Oregon | 1849 | United Church of Christ | 3,589 | Boxers | 1926 | | Yes |
| Pacific Lutheran University | Parkland, Washington | 1890 | Lutheran ELCA | 3,100 | Lutes | 1965 | | Yes |
| University of Puget Sound | Tacoma, Washington | 1888 | United Methodist | 2,600 | Loggers | 1926; 1996 (Note: Puget Sound left the NWC after the 1947–48 school year before rejoining in the 1996–97 school year.) | | Yes |
| Whitman College | Walla Walla, Washington | 1859 | Nonsectarian | 1,544 | Blues | 1926 | | No |
| Whitworth University | Spokane, Washington | 1890 | Presbyterian | 2,220 | Pirates | 1970; 1988 (Note: Whitworth left the NWC after the 1983–84 school year before rejoining in the 1988–89 school year.) | | Yes |
| Willamette University | Salem, Oregon | 1842 | Methodist Mission | 2,402 | Bearcats | 1926 | | Yes |

=== Former members ===
The NWC had two former full members, both were private schools:

| Institution | Location | Founded | Affiliation | Enrollment | Nickname | Joined (Note: Represents the calendar year when fall sports competition begins.) | Left (Note: Represents the calendar year when spring sports competition ends.) | Colors | Current conference |
|---|---|---|---|---|---|---|---|---|---|
| College of Idaho | Caldwell, Idaho | 1891 | Presbyterian | 1,042 | Yotes | 1926 | 1978 | | Cascade (CCC) (Note: Currently an NAIA athletic conference.) |
| Seattle University | Seattle, Washington | 1891 | Catholic (Jesuit) | 7,755 | Redhawks | 1997 | 1999 | | West Coast (WCC) (Note: Currently an NCAA Division I athletic conference.) |

=== Former associate members ===
The NWC had two former associate members, both were private schools:

| Institution | Location | Founded | Affiliation | Enrollment | Nickname | Joined (Note: Represents the calendar year when fall sports competition begins.) | Left (Note: Represents the calendar year when spring sports competition ends.) | Colors | Current conference | NWC sport |
|---|---|---|---|---|---|---|---|---|---|---|
| Menlo College | Atherton, California | 1927 | Nonsectarian | 750 | Oaks | 2006 | 2011 | | Pacific West (PacWest) (Note: Currently an NCAA Division II athletic conference.) | Football (Note: Menlo dropped football after the 2014 fall season (2014–15 school year).) |
| Mills College | Oakland, California | 1852 | Nonsectarian | 1,345 | Cyclones | 2017 | 2022 | | N/A (Note: Mills was acquired by Northeastern University in 2023, becoming part of that university's extended operations in the San Francisco Bay Area. In advance of this, Mills dropped athletics after the 2021–22 school year.) | Women's rowing |

=== Membership timeline ===
Full member (all sports) Full member (non-football) Associate member (football) Associate member (sport)

== Sports ==
The Northwest Conference sponsors championship competition in nine men's and 11 women's NCAA sanctioned sports.

Teams in the Northwest Conference competition
| Sport | Men's | Women's |
|---|---|---|
| Baseball | 9 | – |
| Basketball | 9 | 9 |
| Cross country | 9 | 9 |
| Football | 8 | – |
| Golf | 9 | 9 |
| Lacrosse | – | 8 |
| Soccer | 9 | 9 |
| Softball | – | 8 |
| Swimming | 9 | 9 |
| Tennis | 8 | 8 |
| Track and field | 9 | 9 |
| Volleyball | – | 9 |
| Rowing | – | 4 |

== McIlroy-Lewis All-Sports Trophy ==
Each year the NWC awards one of its member institutions the NWC McIlroy-Lewis All-Sports Trophy, based on a points system. The award is named in honor of Jane McIlroy, former athletic director of Linfield (1950-82), and John Lewis of Willamette (1947-72).

In each sport, the conference champion is awarded 18 points, second place is awarded 16 points, and so on. The school with the most points at the conclusion of the academic year wins the trophy. Football, women's volleyball, men's and women's cross country, men's and women's soccer, men's and women's swimming, men's and women's basketball, men's and women's tennis, men's and women's golf, men's baseball, women's softball, and men's and women's track and field are the 18 sports in which points are awarded.

Whitworth have won the award 16 times, more than any other school. Pacific Lutheran have won the trophy 15 times, Linfield has won the trophy three times while Puget Sound and George Fox have won it twice.

McIlroy-Lewis All-Sports Trophy winners
| Year | Institution |
|---|---|
| 2026 | Whitworth |
| 2025 | Whitworth |
| 2024 | Whitworth |
| 2023 | George Fox |
| 2022 | George Fox |
| 2021 | No trophy awarded |
| 2020 | No trophy awarded |
| 2019 | Whitworth |
| 2018 | Whitworth |
| 2017 | Whitworth |
| 2016 | Whitworth |
| 2015 | Whitworth |
| 2014 | Whitworth |
| 2013 | Whitworth |
| 2012 | Whitworth |
| 2011 | Whitworth |
| 2010 | Whitworth |
| 2009 | Whitworth |
| 2008 | Whitworth |
| 2007 | Puget Sound |
| 2006 | Puget Sound |
| 2005 | Whitworth |
| 2004 | Linfield |
| 2003 | Linfield |
| 2002 | Pacific Lutheran |
| 2001 | Linfield |
| 2000 | Pacific Lutheran |
| 1999 | Pacific Lutheran |
| 1998 | Pacific Lutheran |
| 1997 | Pacific Lutheran |
| 1996 | Pacific Lutheran |
| 1995 | Pacific Lutheran |
| 1994 | Willamette |
| 1993 | Pacific Lutheran |
| 1992 | Pacific Lutheran |
| 1991 | Pacific Lutheran |
| 1990 | Pacific Lutheran |
| 1989 | Pacific Lutheran |
| 1988 | Pacific Lutheran |
| 1987 | Pacific Lutheran |
| 1986 | Pacific Lutheran |

== National championships ==
| Year | Sport | Institution | Location | Association/Division |
|---|---|---|---|---|
| 2023 | Women's Golf | George Fox | Howey-in-the-Hills, Florida | NCAA Division III |
| 2018 | Women's Track & Field | George Fox | La Crosse, Wisconsin | NCAA Division III (Co-Champions with UMass Boston) |
| 2013 | Baseball | Linfield | Appleton, Wisconsin | NCAA Division III |
| 2012 | Softball | Pacific Lutheran | Salem, Virginia | NCAA Division III |
| 2011 | Softball | Linfield | Salem, Virginia | NCAA Division III |
| 2009 | Women's Basketball | George Fox | Holland, Michigan | NCAA Division III |
| 2007 | Softball | Linfield | Salem, Virginia | NCAA Division III |
| 2004 | Football | Linfield | Salem, Virginia | NCAA Division III |
| 2004 | Baseball | George Fox | Appleton, Wisconsin | NCAA Division III |
| 1999 | Football | Pacific Lutheran | Salem, Virginia | NCAA Division III |
| 1999 | Women's Swimming | Puget Sound | Federal Way, Washington | NAIA |
| 1998 | Women's Swimming | Puget Sound | Federal Way, Washington | NAIA |
| 1997 | Men's Soccer | Seattle | Birmingham, Alabama | NAIA |
| 1997 | Men's Swimming | Puget Sound | Federal Way, Washington | NAIA |
| 1996 | Men's Swimming | Puget Sound | San Antonio, Texas | NAIA |
| 1996 | Women's Swimming | Puget Sound | San Antonio, Texas | NAIA |
| 1995 | Men's Swimming | Puget Sound | San Antonio, Texas | NAIA |
| 1995 | Women's Cross Country | Puget Sound | Kenosha, Wisconsin | NAIA |
| 1994 | Women's Cross Country | Puget Sound | Kenosha, Wisconsin | NAIA |
| 1993 | Football | Pacific Lutheran | Portland, Oregon | NAIA Division II |
| 1993 | Women's Cross Country | Puget Sound | Kenosha, Wisconsin | NAIA |
| 1993 | Volleyball | Puget Sound | San Diego, California | NAIA |
| 1993 | Men's Basketball | Willamette | Nampa, Idaho | NAIA Division II |
| 1992 | Women's Cross Country | Puget Sound | Kenosha, Wisconsin | NAIA |
| 1992 | Softball | Pacific Lutheran | Pensacola, Florida | NAIA |
| 1991 | Women's Soccer | Pacific Lutheran | Boca Raton, Florida | NAIA |
| 1990 | Women's Swimming | Puget Sound | Canton, Ohio | NAIA |
| 1989 | Women's Soccer | Pacific Lutheran | Due West, South Carolina | NAIA |
| 1989 | Women's Swimming | Puget Sound | Brown Deer, Wisconsin | NAIA |
| 1988 | Women's Cross Country | Pacific Lutheran | Kenosha, Wisconsin | NAIA |
| 1988 | Women's Soccer | Pacific Lutheran | Abilene, Texas | NAIA |
| 1988 | Softball | Pacific Lutheran | Pensacola, Florida | NAIA |
| 1987 | Football | Pacific Lutheran | Tacoma, Washington | NAIA Division II |
| 1986 | Football | Linfield | McMinnville, Oregon | NAIA Division II |
| 1984 | Football | Linfield | McMinnville, Oregon | NAIA Division II |
| 1982 | Football | Linfield | McMinnville, Oregon | NAIA Division II |
| 1980 | Football | Pacific Lutheran | Tacoma, Washington | NAIA Division II |
| 1971 | Baseball | Linfield | Phoenix, Arizona | NAIA |
| 1966 | Baseball | Linfield | St. Joseph, Missouri | NAIA |
| 1960 | Baseball | Whitworth† | Sioux City, Iowa | NAIA |

† - Whitworth was not a member of the NWC until 1970.

== Football champions ==
- 1926 – College of Idaho
- 1927 – College of Idaho
- 1928 – Whitman
- 1929 – Willamette
- 1930 – Whitman
- 1931 – Whitman
- 1932 – Puget Sound
- 1933 – Puget Sound
- 1934 – Willamette
- 1935 – Linfield and Willamette
- 1936 – Willamette
- 1937 – Willamette
- 1938 – Pacific (OR) and Willamette
- 1939 – Pacific
- 1940 – Willamette
- 1941 – Willamette
- 1942 – Willamette
- 1943 – No champion
- 1944 – No champion
- 1945 – No champion
- 1946 – Willamette
- 1947 – Willamette
- 1948 – College of Idaho
- 1949 – College of Idaho, Lewis & Clark, and Pacific (OR)
- 1950 – Lewis & Clark
- 1951 – Lewis & Clark and Pacific (OR)
- 1952 – Lewis & Clark and Pacific (OR)
- 1953 – College of Idaho
- 1954 – College of Idaho, Lewis & Clark, and Willamette
- 1955 – College of Idaho and Lewis & Clark
- 1956 – Linfield
- 1957 – Linfield
- 1958 – Willamette
- 1959 – Willamette
- 1960 – Willamette
- 1961 – Linfield
- 1962 – Linfield
- 1963 – Lewis & Clark
- 1964 – Linfield
- 1965 – Linfield
- 1966 – Lewis & Clark
- 1967 – Lewis & Clark, Linfield, and Willamette
- 1968 – Willamette
- 1969 – Lewis & Clark, Linfield, Pacific Lutheran, and Whitman
- 1970 – Linfield
- 1971 – Linfield
- 1972 – Linfield
- 1973 – Pacific Lutheran
- 1974 – Linfield
- 1975 – Linfield, Pacific Lutheran, and Whitworth (WA)
- 1976 – Linfield
- 1977 – Linfield
- 1978 – Linfield
- 1979 – Pacific Lutheran
- 1980 – Linfield
- 1981 – Pacific Lutheran
- 1982 – Linfield
- 1983 – Pacific Lutheran
- 1984 – Linfield
