= 2019 NAIA football national championship =

2019 NAIA Football National Championship
Marian Knights	Morningside Mustangs
(12–0)	(13–0)
MSFA	GPAC
38	40
Head coach: Mark Henninger	Head coach: Steve Ryan
Seed 2	Seed 1
	1	2	3	4	Total
Marian	0	7	14	17	38
Morningside	7	14	12	7	40
- Date: December 21, 2019
- Season: 2019
- Stadium: Eddie Robinson Stadium
- Location: Grambling, Louisiana
- MVP: Joe Dolincheck (QB, Morningside)(Offensive); Deion Clayborne (DB, Morningside) (Defensive)
- Referee: Jeff Bell
- Attendance: 1,646

United States TV coverage
- Network: ESPN3
- Announcers: Drew Fellios (play-by-play), Forrest Conoly (analyst), Kristen Bedard (sideline)

The 2019 NAIA football national championship was a four-round, sixteen team tournament played between November 23 and December 21, 2019. The tournament concluded with a single game, played as the 64th Annual NAIA Football National Championship.

The championship game was played at Eddie Robinson Stadium in Grambling, Louisiana, between the undefeated No. 2 Marian Knights, representing Marian University from Indianapolis, Indiana, and the undefeated No. 1 Morningside Mustangs, representing Morningside College from Sioux City, Iowa. This was the first time the championship game was played at this venue after the prior five games had been played at Municipal Stadium in Daytona Beach, Florida. The game was played on December 21, 2019, with kickoff at 7:00 p.m. EST (6:00 p.m. local CST) on ESPN3.

== Teams ==
=== Marian ===
The Marian Knights, led by 7th-year head coach Mark Henninger, entered the national championship game as the #2 seed. They were seeking to win their third national championship, having won in 2012 and 2015. They entered the game 12–0, 8–0 in MSFA play.

2019 Marian Football
Sep. 14	Saint Ambrose	W 49–14
Sep. 21	at Trinity International	W 55–0
Sep. 28	Robert Morris (IL)	W 49–7
Oct. 5	No. 3 Saint Francis (IN)*	W 28–10
Oct. 19	No. 10 Concordia (MI)*	W 28–13
Oct. 26	Lawrence Tech*	W 46–0
Nov. 2	at Taylor*	W 41–3
Nov. 9	at No. 25 Indiana Wesleyan*	W 33–21
Nov. 16	at No. 18 Siena Heights*	W 21–7
NAIA Playoffs (No. 2 seed)
Nov. 23	No. 13 Reinhardt	W 17–7
Nov. 30	No. 10 Cumberlands (KY)	W 30–0
Dec. 7	No. 6 Lindsey Wilson	W 34–24

=== Morningside ===
The Morningside Mustangs, led by 19th-year head coach Steve Ryan, entered the national championship game as the #1 seed and the defending champions, having won their first national championship the year prior. They entered the game 13–0, 9–0 in GPAC play.

2019 Morningside Football
Aug. 31	St. Francis (IL)	W 80–0
Sep. 14	No. 24 Dordt*	W 56–14
Sep. 21	Midland*	W 51–29
Oct. 5	at Hastings*	W 69–13
Oct. 12	at Briar Cliff*	W 49–14
Oct. 19	Jamestown*	W 61–0
Oct. 26	at Dakota Wesleyan*	W 69–0
Nov. 2	at Doane*	W 42–10
Nov. 9	Concordia (NE)*	W 52–7
Nov. 16	at No. 5 Northwestern (IA)*	W 37–27
NAIA Playoffs (No. 1 seed)
Nov. 23	No. 17 Dickinson State	W 57–14
Nov. 30	No. 9 Saint Xavier	W 51–0
Dec. 7	No. 4 Grand View	W 21–16

=== Series history ===
No.	Date	Location	Winning team		Losing team		Notes
1	December 13, 2012^{†}	Rome, GA	#5 Marian	30	#3 Morningside	27	OT
2	December 6, 2014^{%}	Sioux City, IA	#7 Marian	41	#4 Morningside	21	
Series: Marian leads 2–0^{†}2012 NAIA National Championship Game • ^{%}2014 NAIA National Semifinal

== Game summary ==
2019 NAIA Football National Championship Game

Quarter	1	2	3	4	Total
No. 2 Marian	0	7	14	17	38
No. 1 Morningside	7	14	12	7	40

at Eddie Robinson Stadium • Grambling, Louisiana

- Date: Saturday, December 21, 2019
- Game time: 7:00 p.m. EST (6:00 p.m. CST)
- Game attendance: 1,646
- Referee: Jeff Bell
- TV announcers (ESPN3): Drew Fellios (play-by-play), Forrest Conoly (analyst), Kristen Bedard (sideline)

Game information

First Quarter

- (3:34) MORN – Joe Dolincheck 25 yard pass to Bo Els, Chase Carter kick (Drive: 4 plays, 40 yards, 1:35; Morningside 7–0)

Second Quarter

- (7:33) MORN – Joe Dolincheck 22 yard pass to Reid Jurgenmeier, Chase Carter kick (Drive: 9 plays, 62 yards, 4:24; Morningside 14–0)
- (5:27) MAR – Ethan Darter 33 yard pass to Jacob Pressler, Matt Plesac kick (Drive: 6 plays, 64 yards, 2:06; Morningside 14–7)
- (0:54) MORN – Joe Dolincheck 6 yard pass to Sione Tuifua, Chase Carter kick (Drive: 11 plays, 69 yards, 4:33; Morningside 21–7)

Third Quarter

- (10:10) MAR – Ethan Darter 25 yard pass to Johnny William, Matt Plesac kick (Drive: 7 plays, 59 yards, 2:49; Morningside 21–14)
- (6:42) MORN – Joe Dolincheck 7 yard pass to Austin Johnson, kick failed (Drive: 10 plays, 85 yards, 3:28; Morningside 27–14)
- (5:37) MAR – Ethan Darter 54 yard pass to Johnny William, Matt Plesac kick (Drive: 3 plays, 69 yards, 1:05; Morningside 27–21)
- (3:10) MORN – Joe Dolincheck 10 yard pass to Reid Jurgenmeier, kick failed (Drive: 7 plays, 74 yards, 2:27; Morningside 33–21)

Fourth Quarter

- (14:55) MAR – Ethan Darter 4 yard pass to Johnny William, Matt Plesac kick (Drive: 9 plays, 65 yards, 3:15; Morningside 33–28)
- (6:52) MAR – Matt Plesac 34 yard field goal (Drive: 11 plays, 48 yards, 4:52; Morningside 33–31)
- (2:00) MORN – Joe Dolincheck 4 yard pass to Bo Els, Chase Carter kick (Drive: 5 plays, 22 yards, 1:18; Morningside 40–31)
- (1:04) MAR – Ethan Darter 10 yard pass to Johnny William, Matt Plesac kick (Drive: 7 plays, 73 yards, 0:56; Morningside 40–38)

=== Statistics ===
Statistics	MAR	MORN
First downs	21	29
Total yards	414	528
Rushes–yards	31–123	43–224
Passing yards	291	304
Passing: Comp–Att–Int	19–43–1	30–44–1
Time of possession	26:01	33:59

Team	Category	Player	Statistics
Marian	Passing	Ethan Darter	19/43, 291 yards, 5 TD, 1 INT
Marian	Rushing	Charles Salary	26 carries, 111 yards
Marian	Receiving	Johnny William	10 receptions, 161 yards, 4 TD
Morningside	Passing	Joe Dolincheck	30/44, 304 yards, 6 TD, 1 INT
Morningside	Rushing	Arnijae Ponder	30 carries, 130 yards
Morningside	Receiving	Reid Jurgensmeier	7 receptions, 102 yards, 2 TD

== Postseason playoffs ==
A total of sixteen teams were selected to participate in the single-elimination tournament from across the country, with invitations that were revealed on Sunday, November 17, 2019. The field included twelve conference champions who received automatic bids. The field was then filled with at-large selections that were awarded to the highest ranked teams that were not conference champions. First-round seedings were based on the final regular-season edition of the 2019 NAIA Coaches' Poll, with certain minor modifications given based on travel and geographic considerations. Each subsequent round also saw minor modifications based on travel and the geography of the remaining teams.

Quarterfinal pairings were announced by the NAIA on November 23, after the first round results were known.

Semifinal pairings were announced by the NAIA on November 30, soon after completion of the day's quarterfinal games.

1st Round; November 23
1	Morningside (10–0)	57
17	Dickinson State (8–2)	14
8	Northwestern (IA) (9–1)	20
9	Saint Xavier (8–2)	25
4	Grand View (11–0)	31
12	Concordia (MI) (8–2)	30
5	College of Idaho (10–0)	70
16	Ottawa (AZ) (9–1)	23
2	Marian (IN) (9–0)	17
13	Reinhardt (9–2)	7
7	Keiser (9–0)	24
10	Cumberlands (KY) (9-1)	28
3	Kansas Wesleyan (11–0)	42
15	Baker (9–2)	7
6	Lindsey Wilson (10–0)	30
11	Saint Francis (IN) (7–2)	26

Quarterfinals; November 30
1	Morningside (11–0)	51
9	Saint Xavier (9–2)	0
4	Grand View (12–0)	14
5	College of Idaho (11–0)	6
2	Marian (IN) (10–0)	30
10	Cumberlands (KY) (10-1)	0
3	Kansas Wesleyan (12–0)	24
6	Lindsey Wilson (11–0)	35

Semifinals; December 7
1	Morningside (12–0)	21
4	Grand View (13–0)	16
2	Marian (IN) (11–0)	34
6	Lindsey Wilson (12–0)	24

Championship; December 21
1	Morningside (13–0)	40
2	Marian (IN) (12–0)	38
