= Steve Ryan (American football) =

American football player and coach

Current position
- Title: Head coach
- Team: Morningside
- Conference: GPAC
- Record: 250–51

Biographical details
- Education: Wheaton College (B.S. 1989) National-Louis University (M.S. 1997)

Playing career
- 1985–1989: Wheaton (IL)
- Position: Linebacker

Coaching career (HC unless noted)
- 1997–2001: Ottawa (assistant)
- 2002–present: Morningside

Head coaching record
- Overall: 250–51
- Tournaments: 36–19 (NAIA playoffs)

Accomplishments and honors

Championships
- 3× NAIA (2018–2019, 2021); 15× GPAC (2005, 2011–2022, 2024, 2025)

Awards
- 4× NAIA Coach of the Year (2012, 2018, 2019, 2021); 2× AFCA Region 4 (NAIA) Coach of the Year (2005, 2011); 4× GPAC Coach of the Year (2004–2005, 2011, 2017)

Steve Ryan is an American college football coach and former player. He is the head football coach for Morningside College, a position he has held since 2002. Ryan has led the Morningside Mustangs to three NAIA Football National Championships, in 2018, 2019, and 2021.

Ryan graduated from Wheaton College in Wheaton, Illinois in 1989 with his undergraduate degree, where he was a four-time letter winner and three-year starter for the Thunder. He earned a master's degree in 1997 from National Louis University. Prior to his hiring at Morningside, Ryan served as an assistant coach at Ottawa University in Ottawa, Kansas.

== Coaching career ==
Ryan took over as the head coach in 2002 and led the Morningside Mustangs to a 5–5 season. That inaugural season was considered a success as the Mustangs ended a streak of 15 consecutive losing seasons. Ryan has had only one losing season, 2003. Since that year, the Mustangs have appeared in the NAIA playoffs for 12 straight seasons, including the championship game in 2012. They have lost no more than three contests in any season since 2003.

In 2018, Ryan led the Mustangs to an undefeated, 15–0 season, culminating with a national championship win over the Benedictine Ravens. It was the first national championship for both the Mustangs and Ryan.

== Head coaching record ==
Year	Team	Overall	Conference	Standing	Bowl/playoffs	Coaches^{#}
Morningside Mustangs (NAIA independent) (2002)
2002	Morningside	5–5				
Morningside Mustangs (Great Plains Athletic Conference) (2003–present)
2003	Morningside	3–7	3–7	9th		
2004	Morningside	8–3	8–2	2nd	L NAIA First Round	12
2005	Morningside	12–1	10–0	1st	L NAIA Semifinal	3
2006	Morningside	9–3	8–2	3rd	L NAIA Quarterfinal	13
2007	Morningside	9–3	8–2	T–2nd	L NAIA Quarterfinal	11
2008	Morningside	10–2	9–1	2nd	L NAIA Quarterfinal	5
2009	Morningside	10–2	9–1	2nd	L NAIA Quarterfinal	5
2010	Morningside	10–2	9–1	2nd	L NAIA Quarterfinal	5
2011	Morningside	9–2	8–1	1st	L NAIA First Round	9
2012	Morningside	13–1	9–0	1st	L NAIA Championship	2
2013	Morningside	11–2	8–1	1st	L NAIA Semifinal	4
2014	Morningside	11–2	8–1	T–1st	L NAIA Semifinal	3
2015	Morningside	12–2	9–0	1st	L NAIA Semifinal	3
2016	Morningside	10–2	8–0	1st	L NAIA Quarterfinal	5
2017	Morningside	13–1	8–0	1st	L NAIA Semifinal	3
2018	Morningside	15–0	9–0	1st	W NAIA Championship	1
2019	Morningside	14–0	9–0	1st	W NAIA Championship	1
2020–21	Morningside	10–1	8–0	1st	L NAIA Semifinal	3
2021	Morningside	14–0	10–0	1st	W NAIA Championship	1
2022	Morningside	11–1	10–0	1st	L NAIA Quarterfinal	
2023	Morningside	9–3	8–2	T–2nd	L NAIA Second Round	T–10
2024	Morningside	12–2	10–0	1st	L NAIA Semifinal	6
2025	Morningside	9–3	9–1	T–1st	L NAIA Second Round	8
2026	Morningside	1–1	0–1			
Morningside:		250–51	195–23			
Total:		250–51				
National championship Conference title Conference division title or championship game berth
^{#}Rankings from final NAIA Coaches' Poll.

== See also ==
- List of college football career coaching wins leaders
