= NAIA Football Player of the Year Award =

American football award

- Awarded for: Best college football player in the NAIA
- Location: Varies (currently Grambling, Louisiana)
- Country: United States

History
- First award: 1997
- Most recent: Grand View quarterback Jackson Waring

The Rawlings-NAIA Football Player of the Year is an award sponsored by Rawlings. This prize is awarded annually to the best college football player in the National Association of Intercollegiate Athletics.

== Winners ==
| Year | Name | Pos. | Team | Ref. |
|---|---|---|---|---|
| 1997 | Bo Hurley | QB | Findlay | |
| 1998 | Jack Williams | RB | Azusa Pacific | |
| 1999 | Eddie Eviston | QB | Georgetown (KY) | |
| 2000 | Eddie Eviston (2) | QB | Georgetown (KY) | |
| 2001 | Eddie Eviston (3) | QB | Georgetown (KY) | |
| 2002 | Nick Kortan | RB | Sioux Falls | |
| 2003 | Tyler Emmert | QB | Carroll (MT) | |
| 2004 | Cory Jacquay | RB | Saint Francis (IN) | |
| 2005 | Tyler Emmert | QB | Carroll (MT) | |
| 2006 | Brian Kurtz | LB | Saint Francis (IN) | |
| 2007 | Chad Cavender | QB | Sioux Falls | |
| 2008 | Owen Koeppen | LB | Carroll (MT) | |
| 2009 | Lorenzo Brown | QB | Sioux Falls | |
| 2010 | Jon Ryan | WR | Sioux Falls | |
| 2011 | Chance Demarais | RB | Carroll (MT) | |
| 2012 | Jimmy Coy | QB | Saint Xavier | |
| 2013 | Kyle Schuck | WR | Morningside | |
| 2014 | Austin Dodge | QB | Southern Oregon | |
| 2015 | Ryan Kasdorf | QB | Morningside | |
| 2016 | Logan Brettell | QB | Baker | |
| 2017 | Nick Ferrer | QB | Saint Francis (IN) | |
| 2018 | Trent Solsma | QB | Morningside | |
| 2019 | Charles Salary | RB | Marian | |
| 2020 | Tyson Kooima | QB | Northwestern (IA) | |
| 2021 | Joe Dolincheck | QB | Morningside | |
| 2022 | Joe Dolincheck (2) | QB | Morningside | |
| 2023 | Jalyn Gramstad | QB | Northwestern (IA) | |
| 2024 | Jackson Waring | QB | Grand View | |
| 2025 | Jackson Waring (2) | QB | Grand View | |

== Winners by team ==
| Team | Winners | Years |
|---|---|---|
| Morningside | 5 | 2013, 2015, 2018, 2021, 2022 |
| Carroll (MT) | 4 | 2003, 2005, 2008, 2011 |
| Sioux Falls | 4 | 2002, 2007, 2009, 2010 |
| Georgetown (KY) | 3 | 1999, 2000, 2001 |
| Saint Francis (IN) | 3 | 2004, 2006, 2017 |
| Northwestern (IA) | 2 | 2020, 2023 |
| Grand View | 2 | 2024, 2025 |
| Azusa Pacific | 1 | 1998 |
| Baker | 1 | 2016 |
| Findlay | 1 | 1997 |
| Marian (IN) | 1 | 2019 |
| Saint Xavier | 1 | 2012 |
| Southern Oregon | 1 | 2014 |
