= 2021 college football season =

2021 college football season may refer to:

== American leagues ==
- 2021 NCAA Division I FBS football season
- 2021 NCAA Division I FCS football season
- 2021 NCAA Division II football season
- 2021 NCAA Division III football season
- 2021 NAIA football season

== Non-American leagues ==
- 2021 U Sports football season
