= 2018 Saint Francis Cougars football team =

American college football season

2018 Saint Francis Cougars football

NAIA Semifinal, L 28–34 OT at Morningside
- Conference: Mid-States Football Association
- Mideast League
- Record: 10–3 (4–2 MSFA (MEL))
- Head coach: Kevin Donley (21st season)
- Co-offensive coordinators: Patrick Donley (15th season); Trevor Miller (13th season)
- Co-defensive coordinators: Joey Didier (9th season); Eric Wagoner (11th season)
- Home stadium: Bishop John M. D'Arcy Stadium

2018 Mid-States Football Association standings
	Conf.			Overall
Team	W		L	W		L
Mideast League
No. 9 Marian (IN) x^	6	–	0	10	–	1
No. 6 Concordia (MI) ^	5	–	1	10	–	3
No. 3 Saint Francis (IN) ^	4	–	2	10	–	3
No. 25 Siena Heights	3	–	3	7	–	3
Missouri Baptist	2	–	4	4	–	7
Taylor	1	–	5	3	–	7
Lindenwood–Belleville	0	–	6	0	–	11
Midwest League
No. 7 Saint Xavier x^	5	–	0	9	–	4
Olivet Nazarene	4	–	1	5	–	5
St. Ambrose	3	–	2	6	–	4
St. Francis (IL)	2	–	3	4	–	7
Robert Morris (IL)	1	–	4	2	–	9
Trinity International	0	–	5	1	–	9
x – League champion/co-champions ^ – NAIA playoff participant; Rankings from NAIA Coaches' Poll

The 2018 Saint Francis Cougars football team represented the University of Saint Francis as a member of the Mideast League (MEL) in the Mid-States Football Association (MSFA) during the 2018 NAIA football season. Led by 21st-year head coach Kevin Donley, the Cougars compiled an overall record of 10–3 with a mark of 4–2 in conference play, placing third in the MSFA MEL. Saint Francis advanced to the 2018 NAIA football national championship playoff, where the Cougars defeated Grand View in the first round and Baker in the quarterfinals before losing to the eventual national champion, Morningside, in the semifinals. The team played home games at Bishop John M. D'Arcy Stadium in Fort Wayne, Indiana.

== Schedule ==
Date	Time	Opponent	Rank	Site	Result	Attendance	Source
August 25	6:00pm	Robert Morris (IL)*	No. 1	Bishop John M. D'Arcy Stadium; Fort Wayne, IN	W 42–9	3,700	
September 8	4:00pm	at St. Francis (IL)*	No. 1	ATI Field at Joliet Memorial Stadium; Joliet, IL	W 49–19	1,003	
September 15	12:00pm	St. Ambrose*	No. 1	Bishop John M. D'Arcy Stadium; Fort Wayne, IN	W 60–14	3,250	
September 22	2:00pm	at No. 20 Saint Xavier*	No. 1	Deaton Field; Chicago, IL	W 27–19	2,500	
September 29	6:00pm	No. 6 Marian (IN)	No. 1	Bishop D'Arcy Stadium; Fort Wayne, IN (Franciscan Bowl)	L 28–37	4,579	
October 6	1:00pm	at No. 14 Concordia (MI)	No. 5	Cardinal Stadium; Ann Arbor, MI	L 3–7	1,750	
October 13	12:00pm	No. 20 Siena Heights^{†}	No. 13	Bishop John M. D'Arcy Stadium; Fort Wayne, IN	W 22–19 ^{OT}	4,133	
October 20	12:00pm	Missouri Baptist	No. 12	Bishop John M. D'Arcy Stadium; Fort Wayne, IN	W 51–7	2,567	
October 27	2:00pm	at Lindenwood–Belleville	No. 9	Lindenwood Stadium; Belleville, IL	W 64–25	961	
November 3	1:00pm	at Taylor	No. 9	Turner Stadium; Upland, IN	W 40–20	1,873	
November 17	12:00pm	No. 10 Grand View*	No. 8	Bishop John M. D'Arcy Stadium; Fort Wayne, IN (NAIA First Round)	W 34–3	2,789	
November 24	12:00pm	No. 12 Baker*	No. 8	Bishop John M. D'Arcy Stadium; Fort Wayne, IN (NAIA Quarterfinal)	W 33–23	2,173	
December 1	1:00pm	at No. 1 Morningside*	No. 8	Elwood Olsen Stadium; Sioux City, IA (NAIA Semifinal)	L 28–34 ^{OT}	2,000	
*Non-conference game; ^{†}Homecoming; Rankings from NAIA Poll released prior to the game; All times are in Eastern time

== Rankings ==
The team appeared in the NAIA Coaches' polls throughout the season, beginning ranked No. 1 for multiple weeks and finishing at No. 3.

== Awards and honors ==
- Senior linebacker Pierce Harnish was a finalist for the William V. Campbell Trophy.
