= 2018 college football season =

2018 college football season may refer to:

== American leagues ==
- 2018 NCAA Division I FBS football season
- 2018 NCAA Division I FCS football season
- 2018 NCAA Division II football season
- 2018 NCAA Division III football season
- 2018 NAIA football season

== Non-American leagues ==
- 2018 U Sports football season
