= 2018 NAIA football national championship =

The 2018 NAIA football national championship was a four-round, sixteen team tournament played between November 17 and December 15 of 2018. The tournament concluded on December 15 with a single game, played as the 63rd Annual NAIA Football National Championship.

The championship game was played at Municipal Stadium in Daytona Beach, Florida. This was the 5th consecutive time the championship game was played at this venue after the prior six games had been played at Barron Stadium in Rome, Georgia. It was also the final game played at this venue after it was announced that the 2019 championship game will be played in Grambling, Louisiana.

The game was contested between two teams that had never before won a football national championship. On the visiting side of the scoreboard was the once-beaten, #7-ranked Benedictine Ravens, representing Benedictine College from Atchison, Kansas. The home team was the unbeaten, #1-ranked Morningside Mustangs, playing for Morningside College of Sioux City, Iowa. Benedictine was making its first appearance in the championship game while Morningside was appearing for the second time, losing the 2012 championship game in overtime to the Marian Knights.

Morningside was led by the quarterback-receiver duo of Trent Solsma and Connor Niles. Solsma was a first-team All-American who had just received the Rawlings Award in a banquet the prior evening. The award recognized the 2018 NAIA Football Player of the Year. Niles was a second-team All-American, a controversial achievement because many consider Solsma-to-Niles to be one of the most productive duos in NAIA football history. But an NAIA rule restricts the selection of players from the same team. So Solsma received the first-team choice, and Niles was the second-team selection.

In the end, this duo led Morningside to the victory, 35–28. They connected for 3 touchdown passes during the game. For his efforts, Niles was named the game's Most Outstanding Offensive Player. The parallel defensive award was given to Morningside defensive lineman Chase Reis.

== Postseason playoff ==
A total of sixteen teams were selected to participate in the single-elimination tournament from across the country, with invitations that were revealed on Sunday, November 11, 2018. The field included eleven conference champions who received automatic bids. The field was then filled with at-large selections that were awarded to the highest ranked teams that were not conference champions. First-round seedings were based on the final regular-season edition of the 2018 NAIA Coaches' Poll, with certain minor modifications given based on geographic considerations. Each subsequent round will be re-seeded based on the rankings of all teams advancing to that round.

Quarterfinal pairings were announced by the NAIA on November 17, after the first round results were known.

Semifinal pairings were confirmed by the NAIA on November 24, soon after completion of the day's quarterfinal games.

2018 NAIA Football National Championship
Benedictine Ravens	Morningside Mustangs
(13–1)	(14–0)
28	35
Head coach: Larry Wilcox	Head coach: Steve Ryan
Coaches 7	Coaches 1
	1	2	3	4	Total
Benedictine	14	6	0	8	28
Morningside	14	0	14	7	35
- Date: December 15, 2018
- Season: 2018
- Stadium: Municipal Stadium
- Location: Daytona Beach, Florida
- MVP: Connor Niles (WR, Morningside)(Offensive); Chase Reis (DL, Morningside) (Defensive)
- Attendance: 7,436

United States TV coverage
- Network: ESPN3
- Announcers: Drew Fellios; Forrest Conoly; Kristen Bedard

=== Scoring Summary ===
Scoring summary

Quarter	Time	Drive			Team	Scoring information	Score	
Quarter	Time	Plays	Yards	TOP	Team	Scoring information	Benedictine Ravens	Morningside Mustangs
1	13:27	4	69	1:33	Benedictine Ravens	Aaron Jackson 26-yard touchdown reception from Shaefer Schuetz, Jacob Young kick Good	7	0
1	11:26	7	75	2:01	Morningside Mustangs	Connor Niles 44-yard touchdown reception from Trent Solsma, Jared Amundson kick Good	7	7
1	9:03	4	20	1:35	Morningside Mustangs	Arnijae Ponder 7-yard touchdown run, Jared Amundson kick Good	7	14
1	2:28	14	78	6:35	Benedictine Ravens	Marquis Stewart 3-yard touchdown run, Jacob Young kick Good	14	14
2	6:35	4	7	1:37	Benedictine Ravens	24-yard field goal by Jacob Young	17	14
2	0:04	16	73	3:18	Benedictine Ravens	14-yard field goal by Jacob Young	20	14
3	14:22	2	75	0:38	Morningside Mustangs	Connor Niles 80-yard touchdown reception from Trent Solsma, Jared Amundson kick Good	20	21
3	9:53	7	70	2:08	Morningside Mustangs	Reid Jurgensmeier 19-yard touchdown reception from Trent Solsma, Jared Amundson kick Good	20	28
4	5:49	10	62	4:08	Benedictine Ravens	Frank Trent 1-yard touchdown run, 2-point Alex Blake Pass Good	28	28
4	1:29	3	18	0:51	Morningside Mustangs	Connor Niles 16-yard touchdown reception from Trent Solsma, Jared Amundson kick Good	28	35
"TOP" = time of possession. For other American football terms, see Glossary of American football.							Benedictine Ravens	Morningside Mustangs

=== Playoff bracket ===
1st Round; November 17
1	Morningside (11–0)	49
16	Rocky Mountain (8–3)	20
2	Marian (IN) (10–0)	21
17	Saint Xavier (IL) (8–3)	34
8	Saint Francis (IN) (8–2)	34
10	Grand View (8–2)	3
3	Bethel (TN) (10–0)	41
12	Baker (8–2)	44*
6	Kansas Wesleyan (11–0)	15
9	Langston (9–1)	9
5	Northwestern (IA) (9–1)	6
15	Dickinson State (8–2)	14
7	Benedictine (KS) (10–1)	48**
11	Cumberlands (KY) (10–1)	41
4	Reinhardt (9–1)	21
13	Concordia (MI) (9–2)	31

Quarterfinals; November 24
1	Morningside (12–0)	51
17	Saint Xavier (IL) (9–3)	14
8	Saint Francis (IN) (9–2)	51
12	Baker (9–2)	14
6	Kansas Wesleyan (12–0)	43
15	Dickinson State (9–2)	40
7	Benedictine (KS) (11–1)	54
13	Concordia (MI) (10–2)	38

Semifinals; December 1
1	Morningside (13–0)	34*
8	Saint Francis (IN) (10–2)	28
6	Kansas Wesleyan (13–0)	21
7	Benedictine (KS) (12–1)	43

Championship; December 15
1	Morningside (14–0)	35
7	Benedictine (KS) (13–1)	28

* denotes OT / ** denotes double OT
