= 2021 NAIA football rankings =

Rankings for the 2021 NAIA football season

- Season: 2021
- Postseason: Single-elimination
- National champions: Morningside
- Runner up: Grand View

The 2021 National Association of Intercollegiate Athletics (NAIA) football rankings are conducted on a week-to-week basis, starting after week three.

== Legend ==
	Increase in ranking
	Decrease in ranking
	Not ranked previous week or no change
	Selected for NAIA playoffs
(#–#)	Win–loss record
(Italics)	Number of first place votes
т	Tied with team above or below also with this symbol

== NAIA Coaches' poll ==
	Preseason August 2	Week 1 September 13	Week 2 September 20	Week 3 September 27	Week 4 October 4	Week 5 October 11	Week 6 October 18	Week 7 October 25	Week 8 November 1	Week 9 November 8	Week Final November 14	Week Postseason December 20	
1.	Lindsey Wilson (18)	Lindsey Wilson (2–0) (18)	Lindsey Wilson (2–0) (18)	Lindsey Wilson (3–0) (18)	Lindsey Wilson (4–0) (18)	Lindsey Wilson (5–0) (18)	Lindsey Wilson (6–0) (18)	Lindsey Wilson (7–0) (18)	Lindsey Wilson (8–0) (18)	Lindsey Wilson (9–0) (18)	Lindsey Wilson (10–0) (18)	Morningside (14–0) (18)	1.
2.	Northwestern (IA)	Northwestern (IA) (3–0)	Northwestern (IA) (4–0)	Northwestern (IA) (5–0)	Northwestern (IA) (6–0)	Northwestern (IA) (6–0)	Northwestern (IA) (7–0)	Northwestern (IA) (8–0)	Northwestern (IA) (9–0)	Morningside (9–0) (1)	Morningside (10–0) (1)	Grand View (14–1)	2.
3.	Morningside	Morningside (2–0)	Morningside (3–0) (1)	Morningside (3–0) (1)	Morningside (4–0) (1)	Morningside (5–0) (1)	Morningside (6–0) (1)	Morningside (7–0) (1)	Morningside (8–0) (1)	Grand View (10–0)	Grand View (11–0)	Lindsey Wilson (12–1)	3.
4.	Keiser	Grand View (3–0)	Grand View (4–0)	Grand View (5–0)	Grand View (6–0)	Grand View (6–0)	Grand View (7–0)	Grand View (8–0)	Grand View (9–0)	Northwestern (IA) (9–1)	Northwestern (IA) (10–1)	Northwestern (IA) (12–2)	4.
5.	Grand View	Concordia (MI) (1–0)	Concordia (MI) (2–0)	Concordia (MI) (2–0)	Concordia (MI) (3–0)	Concordia (MI) (4–0)	Concordia (MI) (5–0)	Baker (KS) (7–1)	Baker (KS) (8–1)	Kansas Wesleyan (10–0)	Indiana Wesleyan (7–3)	Marian (IN) (9–3)	5.
6.	Concordia (MI)	Olivet Nazarene (1–0)	Reinhardt (2–1)	Keiser (2–1)	Keiser (3–1) т	Keiser (4–1)	Baker (KS) (6–1)	Kansas Wesleyan (8–0)	Kansas Wesleyan (9–0)	Indiana Wesleyan (6–3)	Reinhardt (9–2)	Concordia (MI) (9–2)	6.
7.	Baker (KS)	Reinhardt (1–1)	Keiser (1–1)	Marian (IN) (3–1)	Marian (IN) (4–1) т	Baker (KS) (5–1)	Kansas Wesleyan (7–0)	Indiana Wesleyan (6–1)	Indiana Wesleyan (6–2)	Reinhardt (8–2)	Marian (IN) (8–2)	Keiser (9–3)	7.
8.	Reinhardt	Keiser (1–1)	Marian (IN) (2–1)	Georgetown (KY) (3–0)	Georgetown (KY) (4–0)	Kansas Wesleyan (6–0)	Indiana Wesleyan (5–1)	Reinhardt (6–2)	Reinhardt (7–2)	Marian (IN) (7–2)	Concordia (MI) (8–1)	Southwestern (KS) (9–2)	8.
9.	Marian (IN)	Marian (IN) (1–1)	Georgetown (KY) (2–0)	Baker (KS) (4–1)	Baker (KS) (5–1)	OUAZ (6–0)	OUAZ (6–0)	Marian (IN) (6–2)	Marian (IN) (6–2)	Concordia (MI) (7–1)	Southwestern (KS) (9–1)	Reinhardt (9–3)	9.
10.	Olivet Nazarene	Bethel (KS) (2–0)	Baker (KS) (3–1)	Kansas Wesleyan (4–0)	Kansas Wesleyan (5–0)	Indiana Wesleyan (4–1)	Reinhardt (5–2)	Concordia (MI) (5–1)	Concordia (MI) (6–1)	Bethel (KS) (9–1)	Kansas Wesleyan (10–1)	Kansas Wesleyan (10–2)	10.
11.	Dickinson State	Georgetown (KY) (2–0)	Eastern Oregon (3–0)	Indiana Wesleyan (3–0)	OUAZ (5–0)	Reinhardt (4–2)	Marian (IN) (5–2)	Bethel (KS) (7–1)	Bethel (KS) (8–1)	Baker (KS) (8–2)	Keiser (7–2)	OUAZ (8–1)	11.
12.	Bethel (KS)	Baker (KS) (2–1)	Kansas Wesleyan (3–0)	OUAZ (4–0)	Reinhardt (3–2)	Olivet Nazarene (4–1)	Bethel (KS) (6–1)	Keiser (5–2)	Keiser (6–2)	Keiser (7–2)	Saint Xavier (8–2)	Saint Xavier (8–3)	12.
13.	Georgetown (KY)	Eastern Oregon (2–0)	Saint Francis (IN) (1–0)	Reinhardt (2–2)	Olivet Nazarene (3–1)	Georgetown (KY) (4–1)	Keiser (4–2)	Rocky Mountain (6–1)	Southwestern (KS) (7–1)	Southwestern (KS) (8–1)	Baker (KS) (9–2)	Baker (KS) (9–2)	13.
14.	Dordt	Saint Francis (IN) (0–0)	Indiana Wesleyan (2–0)	Olivet Nazarene (2–1)	Indiana Wesleyan (3–1)	Marian (IN) (4–2)	Faulkner (6–0)	Langston (7–0)	Saint Xavier (6–2)	Saint Xavier (7–2)	OUAZ (8–1)	Central Methodist (9–3)	14.
15.	Arizona Christian	Avila (2–0)	Avila (3–0)	Bethel (KS) (3–1)	Southwestern (KS) (5–0)	Valley City State (6–0)	Dordt (5–1)	Southwestern (KS) (6–1)	OUAZ (6–1)	OUAZ (7–1)	Georgetown (KY) (8–2)	Dickinson State (8–3)	15.
16.	Saint Francis (IN)	Kansas Wesleyan (2–0) т	OUAZ (3–0)	Southwestern (KS) (4–0)	Bethel (KS) (4–1)	Bethel (KS) (5–1)	Rocky Mountain (5–1)	OUAZ (6–1)	Georgetown (KY) (6–2)	Rocky Mountain (7–2)	Central Methodist (9–2)	Georgetown (KY) (8–2)	16.
17.	Benedictine (KS)	Roosevelt (1–0) т	Olivet Nazarene (1–1)	Roosevelt (1–1)	Valley City State (5–0)	Faulkner (5–0)	Southwestern (KS) (6–1)	Olivet Nazarene (5–2)	Rocky Mountain (6–2)	Georgetown (KY) (7–2)	Bethel (KS) (9–2) т	Indiana Wesleyan (7–4)	17.
18.	Eastern Oregon	OUAZ (2–0)	Bethel (KS) (2–1)	Eastern Oregon (3–1)	Saint Xavier (3–1)	Dordt (4–1)	Langston (6–0)	Saint Xavier (5–2)	Langston (7–1)	College of Idaho (7–2)	Dickinson State (8–2) т	Montana Western (8–4)	18.
19.	College of Idaho	Dordt (1–1)	Roosevelt (1–1)	Valley City State (4–0)	Dordt (3–1)	Rocky Mountain (5–1)	Olivet Nazarene (4–2)	Faulkner (6–1)	College of Idaho (6–2)	Dickinson State (7–2)	Montana Western (8–3)	Bethel (KS) (9–2)	19.
20.	Roosevelt	Southwestern (KS) (2–0)	Valley City State (3–0)	Montana Western (4–1)	Faulkner (4–0)	Southwestern (KS) (5–1)	Georgetown (KY) (4–2)	Dordt (5–2)	Dickinson State (6–2)	St. Francis (IL) (6–2)	Arizona Christian (8–2)	Arizona Christian (8–2)	20.
21.	Avila	Valley City State (2–0)	Southwestern (KS) (3–0)	Dordt (3–1)	Cumberlands (KY) (4–0)	Montana Western (5–2)	Saint Xavier (4–2)	Georgetown (KY) (5–2)	St. Francis (IL) (5–2)	Arizona Christian (7–2)	Rocky Mountain (7–3)	Rocky Mountain (7–3)	21.
22.	Southeastern	Arizona Christian (1–1)	Dordt (2–1)	Saint Xavier (2–1)	Avila (4–1)	Langston (5–0)	Montana Western (5–2)	Bethel (TN) (6–2)	Culver–Stockton (7–2)	Central Methodist (8–2)	Culver–Stockton (8–3)	Culver–Stockton (8–3)	22.
23.	OUAZ	Montana Western (2–1)	Montana Western (3–1)	College of Idaho (3–1)	Rocky Mountain (4–1)	Saint Xavier (3–2)	Valley City State (6–1)	St. Thomas (FL) (8–0)	Bethel (TN) (6–3)	Montana Western (7–3)	Dordt (7–3)	Dordt (7–3)	23.
24.	Kansas Wesleyan	Rocky Mountain (2–0)	Arizona Christian (2–1)	Avila (3–1)	Montana Western (4–2)	St. Thomas (FL) (6–0)	Bethel (TN) (5–2)	Dickinson State (5–2)	Arizona Christian (6–2)	Culver–Stockton (7–3)	Faulkner (8–2)	Faulkner (8–2)	24.
25.	Southwestern (KS)	Indiana Wesleyan (1–0)	Faulkner (3–0)	Saint Francis (IN) (1–1)	Langston (5–0)	College of Idaho (4–2)	St. Thomas (FL) (7–0)	College of Idaho (5–2)	Montana Western (6–3)	Dordt (6–3) т; Langston (7–2) т	College of Idaho (7–3)	College of Idaho (7–3)	25.
	Preseason August 2	Week 1 September 13	Week 2 September 20	Week 3 September 27	Week 4 October 4	Week 5 October 11	Week 6 October 18	Week 7 October 25	Week 8 November 1	Week 9 November 8	Week Final November 14	Week Postseason December 20	
		Dropped: College of Idaho (1–1); Dickinson State (0–2); Benedictine (KS) (1–2)	Dropped: Rocky Mountain (2–1)	Dropped: Arizona Christian (2–2); Faulkner (3–0)	Dropped: College of Idaho (3–2); Eastern Oregon (3–2); Roosevelt (1–2)	Dropped: Cumberlands (KY) (4–1); Avila (4–2)	Dropped: College of Idaho (4–2)	Dropped: Montana Western (5–3); Valley City State (6–2)	Dropped: Olivet Nazarene (5–3); Faulkner (6–2); Dordt (5–3); St. Thomas (FL) (8–1)	Dropped: Bethel (TN) (6–4)	Dropped: St. Francis (IL) (6–3); Langston (7–3)	None	
