= 2019 college football season =

2019 college football season may refer to:

== American leagues ==
- 2019 NCAA Division I FBS football season
- 2019 NCAA Division I FCS football season
- 2019 NCAA Division II football season
- 2019 NCAA Division III football season
- 2019 NAIA football season

== Non-American leagues ==
- 2019 U Sports football season
