= 2019 Saint Francis Cougars football team =

American college football season

2019 Saint Francis Cougars football

NAIA Playoff Participant
- Conference: Mid-States Football Association
- Mideast League
- Record: 7–3 (4–2 MSFA (MEL))
- Head coach: Kevin Donley (22nd season)
- Associate head coach: Doug Coate (19th season)
- Offensive coordinator: Patrick Donley, Trevor Miller (16th, 14th season)
- Defensive coordinator: Joey Didier, Eric Wagoner (10th, 12th season)
- Home stadium: Bishop John M. D'Arcy Stadium

2019 Mid-States Football Association standings
| | Conf. | | | Overall |
| Team | W | | L | W | | L |
|---|---|---|---|---|---|---|
Mideast League
| No. 2 Marian (IN) x^ | 6 | – | 0 | 12 | – | 1 |
| No. 12 Concordia (MI) ^ | 4 | – | 2 | 8 | – | 3 |
| No. 11 Saint Francis (IN) ^ | 4 | – | 2 | 7 | – | 3 |
| No. 20 Siena Heights | 3 | – | 3 | 7 | – | 3 |
| Indiana Wesleyan | 3 | – | 3 | 6 | – | 4 |
| Taylor | 1 | – | 5 | 3 | – | 7 |
| Lawrence Tech | 0 | – | 6 | 1 | – | 9 |
Midwest League
| No. 8 Saint Xavier x^ | 6 | – | 0 | 9 | – | 3 |
| Olivet Nazarene | 4 | – | 2 | 6 | – | 5 |
| Robert Morris (IL) | 4 | – | 2 | 5 | – | 5 |
| St. Ambrose | 4 | – | 2 | 4 | – | 5 |
| St. Francis (IL) | 2 | – | 4 | 3 | – | 8 |
| Missouri Baptist | 1 | – | 5 | 2 | – | 9 |
| Trinity International | 0 | – | 6 | 1 | – | 10 |
x – League champion/co-champions ^ – NAIA playoff participant; Rankings from NAIA Coaches' Poll

The 2019 Saint Francis Cougars football team represented the University of Saint Francis, located in Fort Wayne, Indiana, in the 2019 NAIA football season. They were led by head coach Kevin Donley, who served in his 22nd year as the first and only head coach in the history of Saint Francis football. The Cougars played their home games at Bishop John M. D'Arcy Stadium as members of the Mid-States Football Association (MSFA) Mideast League (MEL).

== Schedule ==
| Date | Time | Opponent | Rank | Site | Result | Attendance |
|---|---|---|---|---|---|---|
| September 7 | 5:00 p.m. | at St. Francis (IL)* | No. 3 | ATI Field at Joliet Memorial Stadium; Joliet, IL | W 56–6 | 1,000 |
| September 21 | 8:00 p.m. | at Robert Morris (IL)* | No. 3 | Morris Field; Arlington Heights, IL | W 29–16 | 435 |
| September 28 | 12:00 p.m. | St. Ambrose*^{†} | No. 3 | Bishop D'Arcy Stadium; Fort Wayne, IN | W 31–13 | 3,917 |
| October 5 | 6:00 p.m. | at No. 6 Marian (IN) | No. 3 | St. Vincent Field; Indianapolis, IN (Franciscan Bowl) | L 10–28 | |
| October 12 | 6:00 p.m. | No. 4 Concordia (MI) | No. 8 | Bishop D'Arcy Stadium; Fort Wayne, IN | W 34–27 | 3,739 |
| October 19 | 12:00 p.m. | Indiana Wesleyan | No. 7 | Bishop D'Arcy Stadium; Fort Wayne, IN | W 31–30 | 3,137 |
| October 26 | 12:00 p.m. | No. 18 Siena Heights | No. 6 | Bishop D'Arcy Stadium; Fort Wayne, IN | L 14–24 | 731 |
| November 2 | 12:00 p.m. | at Lawrence Tech | No. 16 | Blue Devils Stadium; Southfield, MI | W 59–20 | 567 |
| November 9 | 1:00 p.m. | at Taylor | No. 13 | Turner Stadium; Upland, IN | W 27–14 | 1,348 |
| November 23 | 1:00 p.m. | at No. 6 Lindsey Wilson* | No. 11 | Blue Raider Stadium; Columbia, KY (NAIA First Round) | L 26–30 | 872 |
*Non-conference game; ^{†}Homecoming; Rankings from NAIA Poll released prior to the game; All times are in Eastern time

== Game summaries ==
=== St. Francis (IL) ===
| | 1 | 2 | 3 | 4 | Total |
|---|---|---|---|---|---|
| #3 Saint Francis (IN) | 14 | 14 | 21 | 7 | 56 |
| St. Francis (IL) | 0 | 0 | 0 | 6 | 6 |

The Saint Francis Cougars traveled to Joliet, Illinois to take on the other St. Francis in a non-conference contest. After the Fighting Saints won the opening toss and deferred possession of the ball, the Cougars returned the opening kickoff to the Fighting Saints' 26-yard line. The first play from scrimmage resulted in a touchdown pass, the first of 7 TD passes thrown in the game by Cougar quarterbacks to 5 different receivers. The outcome was never in doubt as the Cougars built a lead of 56–0 before the Fighting Saints tallied the last touchdown of the game. For his 6 touchdown passes, Cougar starting quarterback Matt Crable was named the Mid-States Football Association's Mideast League Offensive Player of the Week.

=== Robert Morris ===
| | 1 | 2 | 3 | 4 | Total |
|---|---|---|---|---|---|
| #3 Saint Francis (IN) | 20 | 9 | 0 | 0 | 29 |
| Robert Morris | 3 | 0 | 0 | 13 | 16 |

The Cougars traveled to the Chicago area for another non-conference MSFA cross-over game. This week's opponent was the Robert Morris Eagles. The weather was another force to be dealt with as it rained steadily and harshly for almost the entire game. The Eagles were the first to score, taking a 3–0 lead on a first quarter field goal. That lead was short-lived, however, as Saint Francis scored on their following possession. After a failed pass on first down, the Cougars' PJ Dean took a handoff and raced 78 yards down the sidelines for a touchdown. After the extra point was converted, the Cougars led 7–3. On the following kickoff, USF recovered an Eagles' fumble at the 18 yard line, and they scored 4 plays later on a 6-yard pass to Dan Ricksy. A failed extra point kick left USF leading 13–3. Still in the first quarter, Robert Morris ran 3 plays after they received the kick-off, and they punted the ball on 4th down. USF punt returner Matt Kominkiewicz caught the ball and returned it 83 yards for another USF touchdown, finishing the first quarter with a 20–3 lead. The TD punt return by Matt K. made him the first returner in the history of Saint Francis football to have returned both a kickoff and a punt for a touchdown. The return was also the longest TD return ever recorded by a USF player.

The Cougars added 9 points in the second quarter to take a 29–3 lead into the half. The third quarter was scoreless, but Robert Morris made the end of the game exciting when they scored a touchdown, recovered an onside kick, scored another touchdown, and then recovered a second onside kick. But the USF defense stopped further efforts by the Eagles to advance the ball, and the game ended with the final score of 29–16.

=== St. Ambrose ===
| | 1 | 2 | 3 | 4 | Total |
|---|---|---|---|---|---|
| St. Ambrose | 0 | 0 | 7 | 6 | 13 |
| #3 Saint Francis (IN) | 14 | 3 | 0 | 14 | 31 |

It wasn't always pretty, but the #3-ranked Cougars walked away with a Homecoming Game victory over the St. Ambrose Fighting Bees. The final score was 31–13. The Cougars scored a pair of first quarter touchdowns, and they added a field goal in the second quarter to take a 17–0 lead into halftime. After receiving the opening kickoff, USF's opening drive was halted. The Cougars punted the ball, but the team got the ball back after three St. Ambrose plays failed to gain a first down. The Cougars returned the subsequent punt to the St. Ambrose 41-yard line. Three plays and a first down moved the ball to the 30-yard line, and the 4th play was a 30-yard scoring pass from Matt Crable to Matt Kominkiewicz.

Later in the quarter, another USF drive started at the St. Ambrose 41-yard line. A 17-yard pass moved the ball to the 24-yard line. Two plays later, Crable handed the ball to Martel Williams who then dashed 24 yards to the end zone and another USF score.

A second quarter field goal of 24 yards by Gavin Gardner completed the first half scoring. The Cougar offense continued to sputter after the half, being held scoreless in the third quarter. The Fighting Bees took the third quarter opening kickoff and marched 79 yards for the only score of the quarter.

Some welcomed life was produced in the 4th quarter when Crable threw a pass to the sidelines that was caught by Casey Coll. Coll then sped 64 yards for a Cougar touchdown that extended the lead to 24–7. Later in the quarter, Crable completed another touchdown pass to Kominkiewicz, this one going for 28 yards to widen the lead to 31–7. The score remained that way for most of the rest of the quarter. With time expiring and the game coming to an end, the Fighting Bees scored a touchdown pass on the last play of the game. The point-after kick was no good, bringing the final score to 31–13.

The Cougars offense hurt itself multiple times, losing the ball four times during the game. Benefiting from the two fumble recoveries and two interceptions, the Fighting Bees won the time of possession battle 31:56 to 28:04.

Next week, unbeaten #3 USF travels to unbeaten #6 Marian University to begin conference play in a rival game that awards the Franciscan Bowl trophy to the victor.

=== Marian ===
| | 1 | 2 | 3 | 4 | Total |
|---|---|---|---|---|---|
| #3 Saint Francis (IN) | 0 | 10 | 0 | 0 | 10 |
| #6 Marian | 7 | 14 | 0 | 7 | 28 |

For Saint Francis, the playoffs began this week. With 3 games in October against ranked teams, and a fourth game against a respected local rival, the month's game outcomes will have a big impact on the seeding USF receives if it gets invited to play in the post-season tournament.

The game began well for Saint Francis. They kicked the ball to Marian, and the defense eventually forced a punt. The USF offense took over at that point. They drove the ball to midfield, but a fumble was recovered by Marian to halt the progress. Marian took over and proceeded to march downfield for a touchdown and a 7–0 lead. USF never recovered. They remained behind for the entire rest of the game, and they lost by a final score of 28–7. This was the first time in 35 games that Saint Francis had not led or been tied for the lead at some point in a game.

In the second quarter, the Cougars tried a 4th down play. They failed to convert it into a first down, and the ball returned to Marian. The Marian drive produced a score for the first of three consecutive drives, with the middle one being scored on a 1-yard plunge by the Cougars' Martel Williams. After Marian answered with another touchdown of their own, the score was 21–7. Saint Francis kicked a field goal as time expired in the first half to cut the deficit to 21–10.

The third quarter was scoreless as both team provided a strong defensive effort. USF controlled the ball for over 10 minutes of the quarter, but Marian's defense stiffened when key plays were attempted by the Cougars. The possession game then ended any hopes of a USF rally. The USF defense could not get the ball out of the hands of the Marian offense. USF completed a scoreless second half as Marian possessed the ball for over 13 minutes of the final 15-minute quarter. Marian scored the only points in the quarter, an insurance touchdown to bring the score to the final margin.

=== Concordia ===
| | 1 | 2 | 3 | 4 | Total |
|---|---|---|---|---|---|
| #4 Concordia (MI) | 0 | 13 | 0 | 14 | 27 |
| #8 Saint Francis (IN) | 13 | 14 | 0 | 7 | 34 |

For the first time since 2016, the Cougars entered a regular season game as the underdog. The #4 Concordia team beat the Cougars last season 7–3 on the Cardinals' home field, so the Cougars were also looking to avoid a second consecutive loss to the visiting team. USF set the early pace, scoring two first quarter touchdowns to take a 13–0 lead. The first score came on a one-yard run by Matt Crable, and the second occurred after USF's River Walsh blocked a punt that was then scooped up by Nick Lucas and returned for the score. That's the way the first quarter ended.

USF scored first in the second quarter to extend their lead. The score came on a 5-yard pass completion from Crable to Dylan Hunley. Concordia took the following kickoff and returned the ball 42 yards. That good field position was leveraged by Concordia when they scored a 3-yard touchdown after a 27-yard pass completion. After a failed extra point try, the score was USF 20, Concordia 6. Each team added another touchdown before the halftime break to bring the halfway score USF 27, Concordia 13. The USF score came on a 4-yard touchdown pass from Crable to Zenden Dellinger to extend their lead to the largest of the game, a 21-point margin at 27–6.

After a scoreless third quarter, things got interesting and rewarded those fans who stayed to watch the entire game. On a play when Crable's pass was intercepted, Crable himself was injured and had to leave the game. He did not return; the quarterback duties were taken over by backup Heath Simmons.

Concordia was moving the ball at the end of the third quarter, and they completed a touchdown pass a mere four seconds into the final quarter. They converted the extra point to close within one score, now trailing 27–20.

Concordia kicked the ball to the Cougars. After a fourth down try failed, the ball was turned over on downs to the Cardinals at the Concordia 38-yard line. Concordia then methodically completed a 62-yard march to the end zone. The extra point try was good, and the score was now tied, 27-27.

On the following drive, USF was moving the ball, and it looked like it would result in a score and a return to the lead for the Cougars. But a Simmons' pass was intercepted at the Concordia goal line, and ball control returned to the Cardinals with 4:48 left in regulation.

The Cardinals took advantage of the turnover. Starting at their own 20-yard line, Concordia moved downfield to the Saint Francis 22-yard line. With 17 seconds left on the clock, they set up for a 29-yard field goal that would put them in the lead for the first time in the ball game. But Concordia never got the lead. USF defender Matt Swartz blocked the kick, the Cougars' second blocked kick in the game. The ball was retrieved by USF's Jack Givens at the 35-yard line, and he raced 65 yards for the unexpected USF lead. A likely loss was turned into the ultimate victory with 7 seconds left on the clock. The time expired, and USF walked off the field with a 34–27 upset victory.

=== Indiana Wesleyan ===
| | 1 | 2 | 3 | 4 | Total |
|---|---|---|---|---|---|
| Indiana Wesleyan | 14 | 7 | 0 | 9 | 30 |
| #7 Saint Francis (IN) | 7 | 7 | 17 | 0 | 31 |

=== Siena Heights ===
| | 1 | 2 | 3 | 4 | Total |
|---|---|---|---|---|---|
| #18 Siena Heights | 14 | 3 | 7 | 0 | 24 |
| #6 Saint Francis (IN) | 7 | 7 | 0 | 0 | 14 |

=== Lawrence Tech ===
| | 1 | 2 | 3 | 4 | Total |
|---|---|---|---|---|---|
| #16 Saint Francis (IN) | 21 | 21 | 10 | 7 | 59 |
| Lawrence Tech | 6 | 7 | 0 | 7 | 20 |

=== Taylor ===
| | 1 | 2 | 3 | 4 | Total |
|---|---|---|---|---|---|
| #13 Saint Francis (IN) | 14 | 7 | 0 | 6 | 27 |
| Taylor (IN) | 0 | 7 | 0 | 7 | 14 |

=== Lindsey Wilson ===
| | 1 | 2 | 3 | 4 | Total |
|---|---|---|---|---|---|
| #11 Saint Francis (IN) | 0 | 14 | 12 | 0 | 26 |
| #6 Lindsey Wilson (KY) | 9 | 7 | 0 | 14 | 30 |

== Ranking movements ==
Ranking movements Legend: ██ Increase in ranking ██ Decrease in ranking
| | Week | | | | | | | | | | | |
| Poll | Pre | 1 | 2 | 3 | 4 | 5 | 6 | 7 | 8 | 9 | 10 | Final |
|---|---|---|---|---|---|---|---|---|---|---|---|---|
| NAIA Coaches' Poll | 3 | 3 | 3 | 3 | 8 | 7 | 6 | 16 | 13 | 11 | 11 | 11 |
