= 2021 NAIA football season =

American college football season

- Regular season: August 28 – November 13, 2021
- Postseason: November 20 – December 18, 2021
- National Championship: Durham County Memorial Stadium; Durham, NC; December 18, 2021
- Champion: Morningside
- Player of the Year: Joe Dolincheck (quarterback, Morningside)

The 2021 NAIA football season is the component of the 2021 college football season organized by the National Association of Intercollegiate Athletics (NAIA) in the United States. The regular season began on August 28 and culminated on November 13. The season's playoffs, known as the NAIA Football National Championship, began on November 20 and culminated with the championship game on December 18 at Durham County Memorial Stadium in Durham, North Carolina. The Morningside Mustangs defeated the Grand View Vikings in the title game, winning the program's third NAIA title in four seasons under head coach Steve Ryan.

== Conference changes and new programs ==
=== Membership changes ===
School	Former conference	New conference
Allen Yellow Jackets	Appalachian	NCAA D-II Independent
Arkansas Baptist Buffaloes	Independent (NJCAA)	Independent
Edward Waters Tigers	NAIA Independent	SIAC (NCAA D-II)
Iowa Wesleyan Tigers	St. Louis (NCAA D-III)	North Star
Judson University Eagles	New program	MSFA Midwest
Louisiana Christian Wildcats	Am. Southwest (NCAA D-III)	Sooner
Mount Marty Lancers	New program	GPAC

== Conference standings ==
2021 Frontier Conference football standings
	Conf.			Overall
Team	W		L	W		L
No. 25 College of Idaho +	7	–	3	7	–	3
No. 21 Rocky Mountain +	7	–	3	7	–	3
No. 18 Montana Western +^	7	–	3	8	–	4
Carroll (MT)	6	–	4	6	–	4
Montana Tech	5	–	5	5	–	5
Eastern Oregon	4	–	6	4	–	6
Southern Oregon	3	–	7	3	–	7
Montana State–Northern	1	–	9	1	–	10
+ – Conference co-champions; ^ – NAIA playoff participant; Rankings from NAIA Coaches' Poll

2021 Great Plains Athletic Conference football standings
	Conf.			Overall
Team	W		L	W		L
No. 1 Morningside $^	10	–	0	14	–	0
No. 4 Northwestern (IA) ^	9	–	1	12	–	2
Concordia (NE)	7	–	3	7	–	3
No. 23 Dordt	7	–	3	7	–	3
Midland	6	–	4	6	–	5
Doane	5	–	5	5	–	5
Dakota Wesleyan	4	–	6	4	–	7
Briar Cliff	3	–	7	3	–	8
Hastings	2	–	8	2	–	8
Jamestown	2	–	8	2	–	9
Mount Marty	0	–	10	0	–	10
$ – Conference champion; ^ – NAIA playoff participant; Rankings from NAIA Coaches' Poll

2021 Heart of America Athletic Conference football standings
	Conf.			Overall
Team	W		L	W		L
North
No. 2 Grand View x^	5	–	0	14	–	1
No. 22 Culver–Stockton	4	–	1	8	–	3
Peru State	3	–	2	7	–	4
William Penn	2	–	3	3	–	8
Clarke	1	–	4	1	–	10
Graceland	0	–	5	0	–	11
South
No. 14 Central Methodist x^	5	–	0	9	–	3
No. 13 Baker	4	–	1	9	–	2
Benedictine (KS)	3	–	2	7	–	4
Evangel	2	–	3	5	–	6
MidAmerica Nazarene	1	–	4	3	–	8
Missouri Valley	0	–	5	3	–	8
x – Division champion/co-champions; ^ – NAIA playoff participant; Rankings from NAIA Coaches' Poll

2021 Kansas Collegiate Athletic Conference football standings
	Conf.			Overall
Team	W		L	W		L
No. 10 Kansas Wesleyan +^	9	–	1	11	–	2
No. 19 Bethel (KS) +	9	–	1	9	–	2
No. 8 Southwestern (KS) +^	9	–	1	9	–	2
Avila	7	–	3	7	–	3
McPherson	6	–	4	6	–	4
Sterling	5	–	5	6	–	6
Ottawa (KS)	4	–	6	5	–	6
Saint Mary (KS)	3	–	7	3	–	7
Tabor	2	–	8	3	–	8
Friends	1	–	9	1	–	9
Bethany (KS)	0	–	10	0	–	10
+ – Conference co-champions; ^ – NAIA playoff participant; Rankings from NAIA Coaches' Poll

2021 Mid-South Conference football standings
	Conf.			Overall
Team	W		L	W		L
Appalachian Division
No. 9 Reinhardt x^	6	–	0	9	–	3
No. 24 Faulkner	5	–	1	8	–	2
Bluefield	4	–	2	6	–	5
Kentucky Christian	2	–	4	3	–	8
Point	2	–	4	2	–	8
St. Andrews	2	–	4	2	–	9
Union (KY)	0	–	6	1	–	9
Bluegrass Division
No. 3 Lindsey Wilson x^	7	–	0	12	–	1
No. 16 Georgetown (KY)	5	–	2	8	–	2
Bethel (TN)	4	–	3	7	–	4
Thomas More	4	–	3	5	–	5
Cumberlands (KY)	3	–	4	6	–	4
Pikeville	2	–	5	4	–	6
Cumberland (TN)	2	–	5	3	–	7
Campbellsville	1	–	6	1	–	8
Sun Division
No. 7 Keiser x^	5	–	1	9	–	3
Southeastern x	5	–	1	8	–	3
St. Thomas (FL)	4	–	2	9	–	2
Ave Maria	4	–	2	5	–	6
Warner	1	–	5	3	–	8
Webber International	1	–	5	2	–	8
Florida Memorial	1	–	5	2	–	9
x – Division champion/co-champions; ^ – NAIA playoff participant; Rankings from NAIA Coaches' Poll

2021 Mid-States Football Association standings
	Conf.			Overall
Team	W		L	W		L
Mideast League
No. 6 Concordia (MI) x^	6	–	1	9	–	2
No. 5 Marian (IN) x^	6	–	1	9	–	3
Siena Heights	5	–	2	6	–	4
No. 17 Indiana Wesleyan x^	4	–	3	7	–	4
Lawrence Tech	3	–	4	7	–	4
Saint Francis (IN)	2	–	5	3	–	6
Taylor	2	–	5	3	–	7
Madonna	0	–	7	1	–	9
Midwest League
No. 12 Saint Xavier x^	6	–	1	8	–	3
St. Francis (IL) x	6	–	1	6	–	3
Olivet Nazarene	5	–	2	7	–	3
Roosevelt	3	–	4	4	–	6
Judson	3	–	4	4	–	7
St. Ambrose	3	–	4	4	–	7
Missouri Baptist	1	–	6	4	–	7
Trinity International	1	–	6	3	–	8
x – League champion/co-champions ^ – NAIA playoff participant; Rankings from NAIA Coaches' Poll

2021 North Star Athletic Association football standings
	Conf.			Overall
Team	W		L	W		L
No. 15 Dickinson State $^	8	–	0	8	–	3
Valley City State	6	–	2	8	–	2
Waldorf	5	–	3	7	–	3
Dakota State	5	–	3	6	–	4
Mayville State	2	–	6	2	–	9
Iowa Wesleyan	1	–	6	2	–	9
Presentation	0	–	8	0	–	11
$ – Conference champion; ^ – NAIA playoff participant; Rankings from NAIA Coaches' Poll

2021 Sooner Athletic Conference football standings
	Conf.			Overall
Team	W		L	W		L
No. 11 Ottawa (AZ) $^	8	–	1	8	–	2
No. 20 Arizona Christian	7	–	2	8	–	2
Texas Wesleyan	7	–	2	7	–	3
SAGU	6	–	3	9	–	3
Langston	6	–	3	7	–	3
Louisiana Christian	4	–	5	4	–	7
OK Panhandle State	3	–	6	4	–	7
Lyon	2	–	7	2	–	8
Wayland Baptist	2	–	7	2	–	8
Texas College	0	–	9	0	–	11
$ – Conference champion; ^ – NAIA playoff participant; Rankings from NAIA Coaches' Poll

2021 NAIA independents football records
	Conf.			Overall
Team	W		L	W		L
Arkansas Baptist		–		0	–	7

== Postseason ==
=== Bracket ===
1st Round; November 20
1	Lindsey Wilson	48
16	Montana Western	21
6	Reinhardt	13
12	Keiser	16
3	Grand View	38
14	Dickinson State	13
8	Concordia (MI)	47
11	Saint Xavier	3
2	Morningside	63
15	Ottawa (AZ)	38
5	Indiana Wesleyan
10	Kansas Wesleyan	forfeit
4	Northwestern (IA)	24
13	Central Methodist	7
7	Marian (IN)	21
9	Southwestern (KS)	17

Quarterfinals; November 27
1	Lindsey Wilson	54
12	Keiser	12
3	Grand View	31
8	Concordia (MI)	16
2	Morningside	58
10	Kansas Wesleyan	21
4	Northwestern (IA)	25
7	Marian (IN)	20

Semifinals; December 4
1	Lindsey Wilson	28
3	Grand View	34
2	Morningside	28
4	Northwestern (IA)	19

Championship; December 18
3	Grand View	28
2	Morningside	38

== See also ==
- 2021 NCAA Division I FBS football season
- 2021 NCAA Division I FCS football season
- 2021 NCAA Division II football season
- 2021 NCAA Division III football season
- 2021 U Sports football season
