= 2021 Morningside Mustangs football team =

American college football season

2021 Morningside Mustangs football

NAIA national champion GPAC champion

NAIA National Championship Game, W 38–28 vs. Grand View
- Conference: Great Plains Athletic Conference
- Record: 14–0 (10–0 GPAC)
- Head coach: Steve Ryan (20th season)
- Home stadium: Elwood Olsen Stadium

2021 Great Plains Athletic Conference football standings
	Conf.			Overall
Team	W		L	W		L
No. 1 Morningside $^	10	–	0	14	–	0
No. 4 Northwestern (IA) ^	9	–	1	12	–	2
Concordia (NE)	7	–	3	7	–	3
No. 23 Dordt	7	–	3	7	–	3
Midland	6	–	4	6	–	5
Doane	5	–	5	5	–	5
Dakota Wesleyan	4	–	6	4	–	7
Briar Cliff	3	–	7	3	–	8
Hastings	2	–	8	2	–	8
Jamestown	2	–	8	2	–	9
Mount Marty	0	–	10	0	–	10
$ – Conference champion; ^ – NAIA playoff participant; Rankings from NAIA Coaches' Poll

The 2021 Morningside Mustangs football team was an American football team that represented Morningside University as a member of the Great Plains Athletic Conference (GPAC) during the 2021 NAIA football season. In their 20th season under head coach Steve Ryan, the Mustangs compiled a perfect 14–0 record (10–0 against GPAC opponents) and won the NAIA national championship, defeating Grand View, 38–28, in the NAIA National Championship Game.

Senior running back Anthony Sims led the team with 1,653 rushing yards (127.2 yards per game) and 32 touchdowns.

== Schedule ==
Date	Opponent	Site	Result	Attendance	Source
September 4	Concordia (NE)	Elwood Olsen Stadium; Sioux City, IA	W 63–7		
September 11	at Doane	Papik Field; Crete, NE	W 56–14		
September 18	Mount Marty	Elwood Olsen Stadium; Sioux City, IA	W 56–7		
October 2	Midland^{†}	Elwood Olsen Stadium; Sioux City, IA	W 59–14		
October 9	at Hastings	Lloyd Wilson Field; Hastings, NE	W 62–7		
October 16	at Briar Cliff	Sioux City, IA	W 84–7		
October 23	Dordt	Elwood Olsen Stadium; Sioux City, IA	W 34–28		
October 30	Jamestown	Elwood Olsen Stadium; Sioux City, IA	W 70–7		
November 6	at Northwestern (IA)	De Valois Stadium; Orange City, IA	W 55–49		
November 13	at Dakota Wesleyan	Mitchell, SD	W 52–7		
November 20	Ottawa (AZ)*	Elwood Olsen Stadium; Sioux City, IA (NAIA First Round)	W 63–39		
November 27	Kansas Wesleyan*	Elwood Olsen Stadium; Sioux City, IA (NAIA Quarterfinal)	W 58–21		
December 4	Northwestern (IA)*	Elwood Olsen Stadium; Sioux City, IA (NAIA Semifinal)	W 28–19		
December 18	vs. Grand View*	Durham, NC (NAIA Championship Game)	W 38–28		
*Non-conference game; ^{†}Homecoming
