= 2018 NAIA football rankings =

The 2018 NAIA football rankings reports the poll results conducted during the 2018 NAIA football season. Each season, one poll evaluates the various National Association of Intercollegiate Athletics (NAIA) football teams and ranks them. Coaches from each of the football conferences are members of a selection panel, with conferences receiving one vote for every 4 member teams. Sometimes referred to as the football ratings or the NAIA Coaches' Poll, the poll is generally conducted once during the preseason and after each week of play during the regular season.

The Top 25 is determined by compiling points for each vote. A team receives 25 points for each first-place vote, 24 for second-place and so on through the list. The highest and lowest ranking for each team (counting zero for ballots with no votes for a team) are disregarded. To obtain the final tally, each team's ranking is recalculated with an additional point added to each team for every ballot (including discounted ballots) that includes the team.

As an example, if there are 16 voting panelists, and one team is a unanimous choice for the highest ranking, then that team would receive 25 points * 14 ballots + 16 points (one for each ballot cast) = 366 points.

Teams that receive only one point in the ballot are not considered “receiving votes.”

Once the regular season is completed, the NAIA will conduct a playoff to determine the year's national champion. A final poll will be taken after completion of the series of playoff games, collectively referred to as the 2018 NAIA Football National Championship.

== Poll release dates ==
The NAIA released a preseason edition of the rankings on August 6, 2018. A complete schedule of poll release dates will be:

2018 Poll Release Dates
| Spring | None |
| Preseason | August 6 |
| Week 1 | September 10 |
| Week 2 | September 17 |
| Week 3 | September 24 |
| Week 4 | October 1 |
| Week 5 | October 8 |
| Week 6 | October 15 |
| Week 7 | October 22 |
| Week 8 | October 29 |
| Week 9 | November 5 |
| Week 10 (Final Regular Season) | November 11 |
| Postseason | December 18 |

== Week by week poll ==
| | Week 0-Preseason Aug 6* | Week 1-Poll 1 Sep 10 | Week 2-Poll 2 Sep 17 | Week 3-Poll 3 Sep 24 | Week 4-Poll 4 Oct 1 | Week 5-Poll 5 Oct 8 | Week 6-Poll 6 Oct 15 | Week 7-Poll 7 Oct 22 | Week 8-Poll 8 Oct 29 | Week 9-Poll 9 Nov 5 | Week 10-Final Nov 11 | Week 11-Postseason Dec 18 | |
|---|---|---|---|---|---|---|---|---|---|---|---|---|---|
| 1. | Saint Francis (IN) (14-0)(16) | Saint Francis (IN) (2-0)(16) | Saint Francis (IN) (3-0)(16) | Saint Francis (IN) (4-0)(16) | Morningside (IA) (5-0)(13) | Morningside (IA) (6-0)(15) | Morningside (IA) (7-0)(15) | Morningside (IA) (8-0)(15) | Morningside (IA) (9-0)(15) | Morningside (IA) (10-0)(15) | Morningside (IA) (11-0)(15) | Morningside (IA) (15-0)(16) | 1. |
| 2. | Reinhardt (GA) (12-1) | Morningside (IA) (2-0) | Morningside (IA) (3-0) | Morningside (IA) (4-0) | Southern Oregon (4-0)(2) | Marian (IN) (5-0)(1) | Marian (IN) (6-0)(1) | Marian (IN) (7-0)(1) | Marian (IN) (8-0)(1) | Marian (IN) (9-0)(1) | Marian (IN) (10-0)(1) | Benedictine (KS) (13-2) | 2. |
| 3. | Morningside (IA) (13-1) | Southern Oregon (2-0) | Southern Oregon (3-0) | Southern Oregon (4-0) | Marian (IN) (4-0)(1) | Northwestern (IA) (6-0) | Northwestern (IA) (6-0) | Reinhardt (GA) (6-1) | Bethel (TN) (9-0) | Bethel (TN) (9-0) | Bethel (TN) (10-0) | Saint Francis (IN) (10-3) | 3. |
| 4. | Southern Oregon (12-1) | Lindsey Wilson (KY) (2-0) | Lindsey Wilson (KY) (3-0) | Lindsey Wilson (KY) (3-0) | Northwestern (IA) (5-0) | (T) Reinhardt (GA) (5-1) | Lindsey Wilson (KY) (5-1) | Grand View (IA) (6-1) | Reinhardt (GA) (7-1) | Reinhardt (GA) (8-1) | Reinhardt (GA) (9-1) | Kansas Wesleyan (13-1) | 4. |
| 5. | Lindsey Wilson (KY) (11-1) | Northwestern (IA) (2-0) | Northwestern (IA) (3-0) | Northwestern (IA) (4-0) | Saint Francis (IN) (4-1) | (T) Lindsey Wilson (KY) (4-1) | Reinhardt (GA) (6-1) | Bethel (TN) (8-0) | Grand View (IA) (7-1) | Northwestern (IA) (8-1) | Northwestern (IA) (9-1) | Baker (KS) (9-3) | 5. |
| 6. | Saint Xavier (IL) (10-2) | Marian (IN) (2-0) | Marian (IN) (2-0) | Marian (IN) (3-0) | Reinhardt (GA) (4-1) | Evangel (MO) (7-0) | Evangel (MO) (8-0) | Northwestern (IA) (6-1) | Northwestern (IA) (7-1) | Kansas Wesleyan (10-0) | Kansas Wesleyan (11-0) | Concordia (MI) (10-3) | 6. |
| 7. | (T) Georgetown (KY) (9-2) | Reinhardt (GA) (1-1) | Reinhardt (GA) (2-1) | Reinhardt (GA) (3-1) | Lindsey Wilson (KY) (3-1) | Southern Oregon (4-1) | Grand View (IA) (5-1) | Kansas Wesleyan (8-0) | Kansas Wesleyan (9-0) | Benedictine (KS) (9-1) | Benedictine (KS) (10-1) | Saint Xavier (IL) (9-4) | 7. |
| 8. | (T) Northwestern (IA) (10-3) | Concordia (MI) (2-0) | Concordia (MI) (3-0) | Evangel (MO) (5-0) | Evangel (MO) (6-0) | Grand View (IA) (4-1) | Bethel (TN) (7-0) | Benedictine (KS) (7-1) | Benedictine (KS) (8-1) | Saint Francis (IN) (8-2) | Saint Francis (IN) (8-2) | Dickinson State (ND) (9-3) | 8. |
| 9. | Baker (KS) (10-2) | Georgetown (KY) (1-1) | Georgetown (KY) (2-1) | Georgetown (KY) (3-1) | Grand View (IA) (3-1) | Bethel (TN) (6-0) | Kansas Wesleyan (7-0) | Saint Francis (IN) (6-2) | Saint Francis (IN) (7-2) | Evangel (MO) (9-1) | Langston (OK) (9-1) | Marian (IN) (10-1) | 9. |
| 10. | Grand View (IA) (9-3) | Grand View (IA) (1-1) | Evangel (MO) (4-0) | Grand View (IA) (2-1) | Bethel (TN) (5-0) | Kansas Wesleyan (6-0) | Concordia (MI) (6-1) | Lindsey Wilson (KY) (5-2) | Evangel (MO) (9-1) | Langston (OK) (8-1) | Grand View (IA) (8-2) | Bethel (TN) (10-1) | 10. |
| 11. | Southeastern (FL) (8-2) | Evangel (MO) (3-0) | Grand View (IA) (2-1) | Baker (KS) (3-1) | Kansas Wesleyan (5-0) | Concordia (MI) (5-1) | Benedictine (KS) (6-1) | Evangel (MO) (8-1) | Langston (OK) (7-1) | Rocky Mountain (MT) (8-2) | Cumberlands (KY) (10-1) | Reinhardt (GA) (9-2) | 11. |
| 12. | Benedictine (KS) (9-3) | Baker (KS) (1-1) | Baker (KS) (2-1) | Kansas Wesleyan (4-0) | Benedictine (KS) (4-1) | Benedictine (KS) (5-1) | Saint Francis (IN) (5-2) | Langston (OK) (6-1) | Rocky Mountain (MT) (7-2) | Grand View (IA) (7-2) | Baker (KS) (8-2) | (T) Northwestern (IA) (9-2) | 12. |
| 13. | Dickinson State (ND) (9-2) | Langston (OK) (1-0) | Langston (OK) (1-0) | Cumberlands (KY) (5-0) | Langston (OK) (3-1) | Saint Francis (IN) (4-2) | Langston (OK) (5-1) | Rocky Mountain (MT) (6-2) | Cumberlands (KY) (9-1) | Cumberlands (KY) (9-1) | Concordia (MI) (9-2) | (T) Cumberlands (KY) (10-2) | 13. |
| 14. | Langston (OK) (10-1) | Rocky Mountain (MT) (2-1) | Kansas Wesleyan (3-0) | (T) Langston (OK) (2-1) | Concordia (MI) (4-1) | Langston (OK) (4-1) | Southern Oregon (4-2) | Cumberlands (KY) (8-1) | Baker (KS) (6-2) | Baker (KS) (7-2) | Evangel (MO) (9-2) | Langston (OK) (9-2) | 14. |
| 15. | Marian (IN) (7-3) | Benedictine (KS) (2-1) | Benedictine (KS) (2-1) | (T) Bethel (TN) (4-0) | Georgetown (KY) (3-2) | Georgetown (KY) (4-2) | Rocky Mountain (MT) (5-2) | Baker (KS) (5-2) | Concordia (MI) (7-2) | Concordia (MI) (8-2) | Dickinson State (ND) (8-2) | Grand View (IA) (8-3) | 15. |
| 16. | Concordia (MI) (9-2) | Kansas Wesleyan (2-0) | Cumberlands (KY) (4-0) | Benedictine (KS) (3-1) | Dickinson State (ND) (4-1) | Rocky Mountain (MT) (4-2) | Baker (KS) (5-2) | Montana Western (6-1) | Dickinson State (ND) (7-2) | Dickinson State (ND) (8-2) | Rocky Mountain (MT) (8-3) | Rocky Mountain (MT) (8-4) | 16. |
| 17. | Sterling (KS) (9-3) | Cumberlands (KY) (3-0) | Bethel (TN) (3-0) | Concordia (MI) (3-1) | Baker (KS) (3-2) | Baker (KS) (4-2) | Cumberlands (KY) (7-1) | Concordia (MI) (6-2) | Lindsey Wilson (KY) (5-3) | Saint Xavier (IL) (8-3) | Saint Xavier (IL) (8-3) | Evangel (MO) (9-2) | 17. |
| 18. | Tabor (KS) (8-2) | Southeastern (FL) (1-1) | Southeastern (FL) (2-1) | Dickinson State (ND) (3-1) | Cumberlands (KY) (5-1) | Cumberlands (KY) (6-1) | Montana Western (5-1) | Eastern Oregon (5-2) | Saint Xavier (IL) (7-3) | Lindsey Wilson (KY) (6-3) | Lindsey Wilson (KY) (7-3) | Lindsey Wilson (KY) (7-3) | 18. |
| 19. | Campbellsville (KY) (8-2) | Bethel (TN) (2-0) | Dickinson State (ND) (2-1) | Arizona Christian (4-0) | Arizona Christian (5-0) | Montana Western (4-1) | Eastern Oregon (4-2) | Dickinson State (ND) (6-2) | Georgetown (KY) (6-3) | Georgetown (KY) (7-3) | Georgetown (KY) (7-3) | Georgetown (KY) (7-3) | 19. |
| 20. | Rocky Mountain (MT) (6-5) | Dickinson State (ND) (1-1) | Saint Xavier (IL) (2-2) | Montana Tech (3-1) | Montana Tech (3-1) | Siena Heights (MI) (5-0) | Dickinson State (ND) (5-2) | Georgetown (KY) (5-3) | Montana Western (6-2) | Siena Heights (MI) (7-2) | Ottawa (KS) (8-2) | Ottawa (KS) (8-2) | 20. |
| 21. | Kansas Wesleyan (8-3) | Saint Xavier (IL) (1-2) | Arizona Christian (3-0) | Faulkner (AL) (3-1) | Rocky Mountain (MT) (3-2) | Dickinson State (ND) (4-2) | Georgetown (KY) (4-3) | Siena Heights (MI) (6-1) | Avila (MO) (7-1) | Ottawa (KS) (7-2) | Southeastern (FL) (7-3) | Southeastern (FL) (7-3) | 21. |
| 22. | SAGU (8-3) | Arizona Christian (2-0) | Montana Western (3-0) | Webber International (FL) (4-0) | Montana Western (3-1) | Ottawa (KS) (5-1) | Ottawa (KS) (6-1) | Saint Xavier (IL) (6-3) | Midland (NE) (7-2) | Avila (MO) (7-2) | College of Idaho (6-5) | College of Idaho (6-5) | 22. |
| 23. | (T) Arizona Christian (7-3) | Montana Tech (1-0) | Rocky Mountain (MT) (2-2) | Rocky Mountain (MT) (3-2) | Siena Heights (MI) (4-0) | Webber International (FL) (4-1) | Siena Heights (MI) (5-1) | Southern Oregon (4-3) | Siena Heights (MI) (6-2) | Montana Western (6-3) | Dordt (IA) (7-3) | Dordt (IA) (7-3) | 23. |
| 24. | (T) Faulkner (AL) (7-3) | Midland (NE) (2-0) | Montana Tech (2-1) | Montana Western (3-1) | Southeastern (FL) (3-2) | Eastern Oregon (3-2) | Saint Xavier (IL) (5-3) | Avila (MO) (6-1) | Eastern Oregon (5-3) | College of Idaho (5-5) | Eastern Oregon (6-4) | Eastern Oregon (6-4) | 24. |
| 25. | Dakota State (SD) (8-3) | Sterling (KS) (1-1) | Faulkner (AL) (2-1) | Siena Heights (MI) (4-0) | St. Ambrose (IA) (4-1) | Montana Tech (3-2) | Avila (MO) (5-1) | Keiser (FL) (6-2) | Ottawa (KS) (7-2) | Southeastern (FL) (6-3) | (T) Siena Heights (MI) (7-3) (T) Arizona Christian (7-3) | Siena Heights (MI) (7-3) | 25. |
| | Week 0-Preseason Aug 6* | Week 1-Poll 1 Sep 10 | Week 2-Poll 2 Sep 17 | Week 3-Poll 3 Sep 24 | Week 4-Poll 4 Oct 1 | Week 5-Poll 5 Oct 8 | Week 6-Poll 6 Oct 15 | Week 7-Poll 7 Oct 22 | Week 8-Poll 8 Oct 29 | Week 9-Poll 9 Nov 5 | Week 10-Final Nov 11 | Week 11-Postseason Dec 18 | |
| | | Dropped: Tabor (KS); Campbellsville (KY); SAGU; Faulkner (AL); Dakota State (SD) | Dropped: Midland (NE); Sterling (KS) | Dropped: Southeastern (FL); Saint Xavier (IL) | Dropped: Faulkner (AL); Webber International (FL) | Dropped: Arizona Christian; Southeastern (FL); St. Ambrose (IA) | Dropped: Webber International (FL); Montana Tech (IA) | Dropped: Ottawa (KS) | Dropped: Southern Oregon; Keiser (FL) | Dropped: Midland (NE); Eastern Oregon | Dropped: Avila (MO); Montana Western | Dropped: Arizona Christian | |

* preseason rankings include prior season won-loss records

Legend
| | No change in ranking |
| | Increase in ranking |
| | Decrease in ranking |
| | Not ranked previous week |
| | NAIA National Champion |
| (#-#) | Win–loss record |
| Italics | Number of first place votes |
| (т) | Tied with team above or below also with this symbol |

== The postseason tournament ==
A 16-team tournament will be contested to determine the winner of the 2018 NAIA Football National Championship. Teams were selected to the field of participants through a two-tiered selection process. First, any conference champion ranked in the top 20 positions in the final regular-season Coaches' Poll received an automatic bid into the tourney field.

In 2018, the following 12 NAIA conferences (or divisions within large conferences) had champions who were part of this selection process for the automatic invitations:

| Conference | Division |
|---|---|
| Frontier Conference | |
| Great Plains Athletic Conference | |
| Heart of America Athletic Conference | North |
| Heart of America Athletic Conference | South |
| Kansas Collegiate Athletic Conference | |
| Mid-South Conference | Appalachian |
| Mid-South Conference | Bluegrass |
| Mid-South Conference | Sun |
| Mid-States Football Association | Mideast |
| Mid-States Football Association | Midwest |
| North Star Athletic Association | |
| Sooner Athletic Conference | |

After the automatic bids were granted, any open positions in the field were filled with at-large invitations. These at-large entries were granted to the highest ranked teams who were not conference champions. Since there were 12 conference champions, a minimum of four at-large invitations could have been granted to play in the 2018 tournament.

Based on the Week 10 (final regular season) Coaches' Poll, the following teams (11 champions and 5 at-large teams) made up the 2018 playoff field:

| Rank | Team | Conference/Division | Invitation Type |
|---|---|---|---|
| 1 | Morningside (IA) | Great Plains | Automatic - 1 |
| 2 | Marian (IN) | Mid-States / Mideast | Automatic - 2 |
| 3 | Bethel (TN) | Mid-South / Bluegrass | Automatic - 3 |
| 4 | Reinhardt (GA) | Mid-South / Appalachian | Automatic - 4 |
| 5 | Northwestern (IA) | Great Plains | At-large - 1 |
| 6 | Kansas Wesleyan | Kansas Collegiate | Automatic - 5 |
| 7 | Benedictine (KS) | Heart of America / North | Automatic - 6 |
| 8 | Saint Francis (IN) | Mid-States / Mideast | At-large - 2 |
| 9 | Langston (OK) | Sooner | Automatic - 7 |
| 10 | Grand View (IA) | Heart of America / North | At-large - 3 |
| 11 | Cumberlands (KY) | Mid-South / Appalachian | At-large - 4 |
| 12 | Baker (KS) | Heart of America / South | Automatic - 8 |
| 13 | Concordia (MI) | Mid-States / Mideast | At-large - 5 |
| 14 | Evangel (MO) | Heart of America / South | |
| 15 | Dickinson State (ND) | North Star | Automatic - 9 |
| 16 | Rocky Mountain (MT) | Frontier | Automatic - 10 |
| 17 | Saint Xavier (IL) | Mid-States / Midwest | Automatic - 11 |
| 18 | Lindsey Wilson (KY) | Mid-South / Bluegrass | |
| 19 | Georgetown (KY) | Mid-South / Bluegrass | |
| 20 | Ottawa (KS) | Kansas Collegiate | |
| 21 | Southeastern (FL) | Mid-South / Sun | (Outside the Top-20) |
| 22 | College of Idaho | Frontier | |
| 23 | Dordt (IA) | Great Plains | |
| 24 | Eastern Oregon | Frontier | |
| 25 | Siena Heights (MI) | Mid-States / Mideast | |
| 25 | Arizona Christian | Sooner | |

After the tournament participants were determined, the top 8 seeds were granted first round home games. Opponents were determined based on the oft-used tournament protocol that pairs highest seeds with lowest seeds: #1 vs. the lowest seeded entry, usually #16), #2 vs. the second-lowest seeded entry, usually #15), #3 vs. the third-lowest seeded entry, usually #14), etc. This alignment was then tweaked for geographic considerations by the tournament selection officials.

The first round tournament match-ups, finalized and announced on Sunday, November 11 , were:

| Rank | Visitor | | Rank | Home |
|---|---|---|---|---|
| #16 | Rocky Mountain (MT) 20 | at | #1 | Morningside (IA) 49 |
| #17 | Saint Xavier (IL) 34 | at | #2 | Marian (IN) 21 |
| #12 | Baker (KS) 44 | at | #3 | Bethel (TN) 41 |
| #13 | Concordia (MI) 31 | at | #4 | Reinhardt (GA) 21 |
| #15 | Dickinson State (ND) 14 | at | #5 | Northwestern (IA) 6 |
| #9 | Langston (OK) 9 | at | #6 | Kansas Wesleyan 15 |
| #11 | Cumberlands (KY) 41 | at | #7 | Benedictine (KS) 48 |
| #10 | Grand View (IA) 3 | at | #8 | Saint Francis (IN) 34 |

== Leading vote-getters ==
Since the inception of the Coaches' Poll in 1999, the #1 ranking in the various weekly polls has been held by only a select group of teams. Through the last (postseason) poll of the 2018 season, the teams and the number of times they have held the #1 weekly ranking are shown below. The number of times a team has been ranked #1 in the postseason poll (the national champion) is shown in parentheses.

There has been only one tie for the leading vote-getter in a weekly poll. In 2015, Southern Oregon was tied with Marian (IN) in the preseason poll.

In 1999, the results of a postseason poll, if one was conducted, are not known. Therefore, an additional poll has been presumed, and the #1 postseason ranking has been credited to the postseason tournament champion, the Northwestern Oklahoma State Rangers.

| Team | Total #1 Rankings |
|---|---|
| Carroll (MT) | 57 (6) |
| Sioux Falls (SD) | 55 (3) |
| Morningside (IA) | 28 (1) |
| Georgetown (KY) | 25 (2) |
| Marian (IN) | 24 (2) |
| Saint Francis (IN) | 21 (2) |
| Saint Xavier (IL) | 14 (1) |
| Northwestern Oklahoma State | 12 (1) |
| Southern Oregon | 5 (1) |
| Grand View (IA) | 4 (1) |
| Lindsey Wilson (KY) | 4 |
| Azusa Pacific (CA) | 3 |
| Cumberlands (KY) | 2 |
