= 2019 NAIA football rankings =

The 2019 NAIA football rankings reports the poll results conducted during the 2019 NAIA football season. Each season, one poll evaluates the various National Association of Intercollegiate Athletics (NAIA) football teams and ranks them. Coaches from each of the football conferences are members of a selection panel, with conferences receiving one vote for every four member teams. Sometimes referred to as the football ratings or the NAIA Coaches' Poll, the poll is generally conducted once during the preseason and after each week of play during the regular season.

The Top 25 was determined by compiling points for each vote. A team received 25 points for each first-place vote, 24 for second-place and so on through the list. The highest and lowest ranking for each team (counting zero for ballots with no votes for a team) were disregarded. To obtain the final tally, each team's ranking was recalculated with an additional point added to each team for every ballot (including discounted ballots) that includes the team.

As an example, if there were 17 voting panelists, and one team is a unanimous choice for the highest ranking, then that team would receive 25 points * 15 ballots (disregard 2 ballots) + 17 points (one for each ballot cast) = 392 points.

Teams that received only one point in the ballot were not considered "receiving votes."

Once the regular season was completed, the NAIA conducted a playoff to determine the year's national champion. A final poll was taken after completion of the series of playoff games, collectively referred to as the 2019 NAIA Football National Championship.

== Poll release dates ==
The NAIA released a preseason edition of the rankings on August 5, 2019. A complete schedule of poll release dates will be:

2019 poll release dates
Spring	None
Preseason	August 5
Week 1	September 16
Week 2	September 23
Week 3	September 30
Week 4	October 7
Week 5	October 14
Week 6	October 21
Week 7	October 28
Week 8	November 4
Week 9	November 11
Week 10 (final regular season)	November 17
Postseason	December 27

== Week by week poll ==
	Week 0-Preseason Aug 5*	Week 1-Poll 1 Sep 16	Week 2-Poll 2 Sep 23	Week 3-Poll 3 Sep 30	Week 4-Poll 4 Oct 7	Week 5-Poll 5 Oct 14	Week 6-Poll 6 Oct 21	Week 7-Poll 7 Oct 28	Week 8-Poll 8 Nov 4	Week 9-Poll 9 Nov 10	Week 10-Final Nov 17	Week 11-Postseason Dec 27	
1.	Morningside (IA) (15-0)(16)	Morningside (IA) (2-0)(17)	Morningside (IA) (3-0)(17)	Morningside (IA) (3-0)(17)	Morningside (IA) (4-0)(17)	Morningside (IA) (5-0)(17)	Morningside (IA) (6-0)(17)	Morningside (IA) (7-0)(17)	Morningside (IA) (8-0)(17)	Morningside (IA) (9-0)(17)	Morningside (IA) (10-0)(17)	Morningside (IA) (14-0)(17)	1.
2.	Benedictine (KS) (13-2)	Benedictine (KS) (3-0)	Benedictine (KS) (4-0)	Benedictine (KS) (5-0)	Kansas Wesleyan (5-0)	Kansas Wesleyan (6-0)	Kansas Wesleyan (7-0)	Marian (IN) (6-0)	Marian (IN) (7-0)	Marian (IN) (8-0)	Marian (IN) (9-0)	Marian (IN) (12-1)	2.
3.	Saint Francis (IN) (10-3)	Saint Francis (IN) (1-0)	Saint Francis (IN) (2-0)	Saint Francis (IN) (3-0)	Marian (IN) (4-0)	Marian (IN) (4-0)	Marian (IN) (5-0)	Kansas Wesleyan (8-0)	Kansas Wesleyan (9-0)	Kansas Wesleyan (10-0)	Kansas Wesleyan (11-0)	Grand View (IA) (13-1)	3.
4.	Kansas Wesleyan (13-1)	Kansas Wesleyan (3-0)	Kansas Wesleyan (4-0)	Kansas Wesleyan (5-0)	Concordia (MI) (5-0)	Grand View (IA) (6-0)	Grand View (IA) (7-0)	Grand View (IA) (8-0)	Grand View (IA) (9-0)	Grand View (IA) (10-0)	Grand View (IA) (11-0)	Lindsey Wilson (KY) (12-1)	4.
5.	Saint Xavier (IL) (9-4)	Saint Xavier (IL) (1-0)	Concordia (MI) (3-0)	Concordia (MI) (4-0)	Grand View (IA) (6-0)	Benedictine (KS) (5-1)	Northwestern (IA) (6-0)	Northwestern (IA) (7-0)	Northwestern (IA) (8-0)	Northwestern (IA) (9-0)	College of Idaho (10-0)	College of Idaho (11-1)	5.
6.	Concordia (MI) (10-3)	Concordia (MI) (2-0)	Marian (IN) (2-0)	Marian (IN) (3-0)	Benedictine (KS) (5-1)	Northwestern (IA) (5-0)	Saint Francis (IN) (5-1)	College of Idaho (7-0)	College of Idaho (8-0)	College of Idaho (9-0)	Lindsey Wilson (KY) (10-0)	Kansas Wesleyan (12-1)	6.
7.	Marian (IN) (10-1)	Marian (IN) (1-0)	Grand View (IA) (4-0)	Grand View (IA) (5-0)	Northwestern (IA) (4-0)	Saint Francis (IN) (4-1)	College of Idaho (6-0)	Lindsey Wilson (KY) (8-0)	Lindsey Wilson (KY) (8-0)	Lindsey Wilson (KY) (9-0)	Keiser (FL) (9-0)	Cumberlands (KY) (10-2)	7.
8.	Baker (KS) (9-3)	Reinhardt (GA) (3-0)	Northwestern (IA) (3-0)	Northwestern (IA) (4-0)	(T) College of Idaho (4-0)	College of Idaho (5-0)	Lindsey Wilson (KY) (7-0)	Cumberlands (KY) (7-0)	Cumberlands (KY) (8-0)	Cumberlands (KY) (9-0)	Northwestern (IA) (9-1)	Saint Xavier (IL) (9-3)	8.
9.	Dickinson State (ND) (9-3)	Grand View (IA) (3-0)	Saint Xavier (IL) (1-1)	College of Idaho (4-0)	(T) Saint Francis (IN) (3-1)	Lindsey Wilson (KY) (6-0)	Cumberlands (KY) (6-0)	Evangel (MO) (7-1)	Evangel (MO) (8-1)	Keiser (FL) (8-0)	Saint Xavier (IL) (8-2)	Keiser (FL) (9-1)	9.
10.	Reinhardt (GA) (9-2)	Northwestern (IA) (2-0)	College of Idaho (3-0)	Lindsey Wilson (KY) (4-0)	Lindsey Wilson (KY) (5-0)	Concordia (MI) (5-1)	Evangel (MO) (6-1)	Keiser (FL) (7-0)	Keiser (FL) (7-0)	Saint Xavier (IL) (7-2)	Cumberlands (KY) (9-1)	Northwestern (IA) (9-2)	10.
11.	Northwestern (IA) (9-2)	College of Idaho (3-0)	Lindsey Wilson (KY) (4-0)	Cumberlands (KY) (3-0)	Cumberlands (KY) (4-0)	Cumberlands (KY) (5-0)	Saint Xavier (IL) (4-2)	Saint Xavier (IL) (5-2)	Saint Xavier (IL) (6-2)	Saint Francis (IN) (7-2)	Saint Francis (IN) (7-2)	Saint Francis (IN) (7-3)	11.
12.	Grand View (IA) (8-3)	Lindsey Wilson (KY) (3-0)	Evangel (MO) (4-0)	Southeastern (FL) (3-0)	Southeastern (FL) (4-0)	Southeastern (FL) (5-0)	Keiser (FL) (6-0)	Ottawa (AZ) (8-0)	Benedictine (KS) (7-2)	Concordia (MI) (7-2)	Concordia (MI) (8-2)	Concordia (MI) (8-3)	12.
13.	Lindsey Wilson (KY) (7-3)	Baker (KS) (2-1)	Cumberlands (KY) (2-0)	Dickinson State (ND) (3-1)	Saint Xavier (IL) (2-2)	Saint Xavier (IL) (3-2)	Dickinson State (ND) (6-1)	Benedictine (KS) (6-2)	Saint Francis (IN) (6-2)	Reinhardt (GA) (8-2)	Reinhardt (GA) (9-2)	Reinhardt (GA) (9-3)	13.
14.	Langston (OK) (9-2)	(T) Evangel (MO) (3-0)	Reinhardt (GA) (3-1)	Bethel (TN) (3-1)	Dickinson State (ND) (4-1)	Dickinson State (ND) (5-1)	Benedictine (KS) (5-2)	Siena Heights (MI) (7-1)	Concordia (MI) (6-2)	Southeastern (FL) (8-1)	Southeastern (FL) (8-1)	Baker (KS) (9-3)	14.
15.	College of Idaho (6-5)	(T) Cumberlands (KY) (1-0)	Southeastern (FL) (2-0)	Saint Xavier (IL) (1-2)	Montana Western (4-0)	Langston (OK) (4-1)	Ottawa (AZ) (7-0)	Concordia (MI) (6-2)	Reinhardt (GA) (8-2)	Baker (KS) (8-2)	Baker (KS) (9-2)	Southeastern (FL) (8-1)	15.
16.	Bethel (TN) (10-1)	Dickinson State (ND) (1-1)	Dickinson State (ND) (2-1)	Montana Western (4-0)	Langston (OK) (3-1)	Evangel (MO) (5-1)	Concordia (MI) (5-2)	Saint Francis (IN) (5-2)	Southeastern (FL) (7-1)	Ottawa (AZ) (8-1)	Ottawa (AZ) (9-1)	Ottawa (AZ) (9-2)	16.
17.	Cumberlands (KY) (10-2)	Southeastern (FL) (1-0)	Bethel (TN) (2-1)	Langston (OK) (2-1)	Evangel (MO) (5-1)	Ottawa (AZ) (6-0)	Reinhardt (GA) (6-2)	Reinhardt (GA) (7-2)	Montana Tech (6-2)	Evangel (MO) (8-2)	Dickinson State (ND) (8-2)	Dickinson State (ND) (8-3)	17.
18.	Evangel (MO) (9-2)	Bethel (TN) (2-1)	Langston (OK) (2-1)	Evangel (MO) (4-1)	Ottawa (AZ) (5-0)	Keiser (FL) (5-0)	Siena Heights (MI) (6-1)	Southeastern (FL) (6-1)	Baker (KS) (7-2)	Dickinson State (ND) (8-2) (T)	Benedictine (KS) (8-3)	Benedictine (KS) (8-3)	18.
19.	Southeastern (FL) (7-3)	Langston (OK) (1-1)	Montana Western (3-0)	Siena Heights (MI) (4-0)	Keiser (FL) (4-0)	Montana Tech (4-1)	Southeastern (FL) (5-1)	Montana Tech (5-2)	Ottawa (AZ) (8-1)	Siena Heights (MI) (7-2) (T)	Langston (OK) (8-2)	Langston (OK) (8-2)	19.
20.	Southern Oregon (6-4)	Montana Western (2-0)	Siena Heights (MI) (3-0)	Ottawa (AZ) (4-0)	Reinhardt (GA) (4-2)	Reinhardt (GA) (5-2)	Montana Tech (4-2)	Baker (KS) (6-2)	Dickinson State (ND) (7-2)	Benedictine (KS) (7-3)	Siena Heights (MI) (7-3)	(T) Siena Heights (MI) (7-3)	20.
21.	Georgetown (KY) (7-3)	Ottawa (KS) (1-0)	Ottawa (AZ) (3-0)	Reinhardt (GA) (3-2)	Siena Heights (MI) (4-1)	Siena Heights (MI) (5-1)	Baker (KS) (5-2)	Dickinson State (ND) (6-2)	Siena Heights (MI) (7-2)	Langston (OK) (7-2)	Evangel (MO) (8-3)	(T) Evangel (MO) (8-3)	21.
22.	Ottawa (KS) (8-2)	Siena Heights (MI) (2-0)	Baker (KS) (2-2)	Keiser (FL) (3-0)	Montana Tech (3-1)	Montana Western (4-1)	Langston (OK) (4-2)	Langston (OK) (5-2)	Langston (OK) (6-2)	Carroll (MT) (6-3)	Montana Western (7-3)	Montana Western (7-3)	22.
23.	Rocky Mountain (MT) (8-4)	Ottawa (AZ) (2-0)	Cumberland (TN) (3-0)	Montana Tech (3-1)	Bethel (TN) (3-2)	MidAmerica Nazarene (KS) (5-1)	Sterling (KS) (6-1)	Sterling (KS) (6-1)	Sterling (KS) (7-1)	Montana Tech (6-3)	Waldorf (IA) (7-3)	Waldorf (IA) (7-3)	23.
24.	Dordt (IA) (7-3)	Rocky Mountain (MT) (2-1)	Keiser (FL) (2-0)	Baker (KS) (3-2)	Baker (KS) (4-2)	Baker (KS) (4-2)	Montana Western (4-2)	Montana Western (5-2)	Montana Western (6-2)	Dordt (IA) (7-3)	Bethel (KS) (8-3)	Bethel (KS) (8-3)	24.
25.	Montana Western (6-4)	Cumberland (TN) (2-0)	Montana Tech (2-1)	Bethel (KS) (3-0)	MidAmerica Nazarene (KS) (5-1)	Sterling (KS) (5-1)	Waldorf (IA) (5-2)	Waldorf (IA) (6-2)	Indiana Wesleyan (6-2)	Bethel (KS) (8-2)	Carroll (MT) (6-4)	Carroll (MT) (6-4)	25.
	Week 0-Preseason Aug 5*	Week 1-Poll 1 Sep 16	Week 2-Poll 2 Sep 23	Week 3-Poll 3 Sep 30	Week 4-Poll 4 Oct 7	Week 5-Poll 5 Oct 14	Week 6-Poll 6 Oct 21	Week 7-Poll 7 Oct 28	Week 8-Poll 8 Nov 4	Week 9-Poll 9 Nov 10	Week 10-Final Nov 17	Week 11-Postseason Dec 27	
		Dropped: Georgetown (KY); Dordt (IA); Southern Oregon	Dropped: Ottawa (KS); Rocky Mountain (MT)	Dropped: Cumberland (TN)	Dropped: Bethel (KS)	Dropped: Bethel (TN)	Dropped: MidAmerica Nazarene (KS)	Dropped: NONE	Dropped: Waldorf (IA)	Dropped: Sterling (KS); Montana Western; Indiana Wesleyan	Dropped: Montana Tech; Dordt (IA)	Dropped: NONE	

* preseason rankings include prior season won-loss records

Legend
	No change in ranking
	Increase in ranking
	Decrease in ranking
	Not ranked previous week
	NAIA National Champion
(#-#)	Win–loss record
Italics	Number of first place votes
(т)	Tied with team above or below also with this symbol

== The postseason tournament ==
A 16-team tournament was contested to determine the winner of the 2019 NAIA Football National Championship. Teams were selected to the field of participants through a two-tiered selection process.

First, any conference champion ranked in the top 20 positions in the final regular-season Coaches' Poll received an automatic bid into the tourney field.

After the automatic bids were granted, any open positions in the field were filled with at-large invitations. These at-large entries were granted to the highest ranked teams who were not conference champions.

In 2019, there were 12 NAIA conferences (or divisions within large conferences) who had champions that were part of the selection process for the automatic invitations. The 12 eligible conferences for the 2019 season were:

Conference	Division
Frontier Conference	
Great Plains Athletic Conference	
Heart of America Athletic Conference	North
Heart of America Athletic Conference	South
Kansas Collegiate Athletic Conference	
Mid-South Conference	Appalachian
Mid-South Conference	Bluegrass
Mid-South Conference	Sun
Mid-States Football Association	Mideast
Mid-States Football Association	Midwest
North Star Athletic Association	
Sooner Athletic Conference	

Since all 12 conference champions finished in the top 20 positions in the final poll, they each received an automatic place in the tournament. Therefore, a total of four at-large invitations were granted to play in the 2019 tournament. Based on the Week 10 (final regular season) Coaches' Poll, the following teams (12 champions and four at-large teams) made up the 2019 playoff field:

Rank	Team	Conference/division	Invitation type
1	Morningside (IA)	Great Plains	Automatic - 1
2	Marian (IN)	Mid-States / Mideast	Automatic - 2
3	Kansas Wesleyan	Kansas Collegiate	Automatic - 3
4	Grand View (IA)	Heart of America / North	Automatic - 4
5	College of Idaho	Frontier	Automatic - 5
6	Lindsey Wilson (KY)	Mid-South / Bluegrass	Automatic - 6
7	Keiser (FL)	Mid-South / Sun	Automatic - 7
8	Northwestern (IA)	Great Plains	At-large - 1
9	Saint Xavier (IL)	Mid-States / Midwest	Automatic - 8
10	Cumberlands (KY)	Mid-South / Bluegrass	At-large - 2
11	Saint Francis (IN)	Mid-States / Mideast	At-large - 3
12	Concordia (MI)	Mid-States / Mideast	At-large - 4
13	Reinhardt (GA)	Mid-South / Appalachian	Automatic - 9
14	Southeastern (FL)	Mid-South / Sun	
15	Baker (KS)	Heart of America / South	Automatic - 10
16	Ottawa (AZ)	Sooner	Automatic - 11
17	Dickinson State (ND)	North Star	Automatic - 12
18	Benedictine (KS)	Heart of America / South	
19	Langston (OK)	Sooner	
20	Siena Heights (MI)	Mid-States / Mideast	
21	Evangel (MO)	Heart of America / South	
22	Montana Western	Frontier	
23	Waldorf (IA)	North Star	
24	Bethel (KS)	Kansas Collegiate	
25	Carroll (MT)	Frontier	

After the tournament participants were determined, the top eight seeds were granted first round home games. Opponents were generally determined based on the oft-used tournament protocol that pairs highest seeds with lowest seeds: #1 vs. the lowest seeded entry (usually #16), #2 vs. the second-lowest seeded entry (usually #15), #3 vs. the third-lowest seeded entry (usually #14), etc. This alignment was then tweaked, for geographic and travel considerations, by the tournament selection officials to determine the announced first-round pairings.

The first round tournament match-ups, finalized and announced on Sunday, November 17 , were:

Rank	Visitor		Rank	Home
#17	Dickinson State (ND)	at	#1	Morningside (IA)
#13	Reinhardt (GA)	at	#2	Marian (IN)
#15	Baker (KS)	at	#3	Kansas Wesleyan
#12	Concordia (MI)	at	#4	Grand View (IA)
#16	Ottawa (AZ)	at	#5	College of Idaho
#11	Saint Francis (IN)	at	#6	Lindsey Wilson (KY)
#10	Cumberlands (KY)	at	#7	Keiser (FL)
#9	Saint Xavier (IL)	at	#8	Northwestern (IA)

== Leading vote-getters ==
Since the inception of the Coaches' Poll in 1999, the #1 ranking in the various weekly polls has been held by only a select group of teams. Through the final poll of the 2019 season, the teams and the number of times they have held the #1 weekly ranking are shown below. The number of times a team has been ranked #1 in the postseason poll (the national champion) is shown in parentheses.

There has been only one tie for the leading vote-getter in a weekly poll. In 2015, Southern Oregon was tied with Marian (IN) in the preseason poll.

In 1999, the results of a postseason poll, if one was conducted, are not known. Therefore, an additional poll has been presumed, and the #1 postseason ranking has been credited to the postseason tournament champion, the Northwestern Oklahoma State Rangers.

Team	Total #1 rankings
Carroll (MT)	57 (6)
Sioux Falls (SD)	55 (3)
Morningside (IA)	40 (2)
Georgetown (KY)	25 (2)
Marian (IN)	24 (2)
Saint Francis (IN)	21 (2)
Saint Xavier (IL)	14 (1)
Northwestern Oklahoma State	12 (1)
Southern Oregon	5 (1)
Grand View (IA)	4 (1)
Lindsey Wilson (KY)	4
Azusa Pacific (CA)	3
Cumberlands (KY)	2
