= 2019 Morningside Mustangs football team =

American college football season

2019 Morningside Mustangs football

NAIA national champion GPAC champion

NAIA National Championship Game, W 40–38 vs. Marian (IN)
- Conference: Great Plains Athletic Conference
- Record: 14–0 (8–0 GPAC)
- Head coach: Steve Ryan (18th season)
- Co-defensive coordinators: Casey Jacobsen (9th season); Nathan Turner (9th season)
- Home stadium: Elwood Olsen Stadium

2019 Great Plains Athletic Conference football standings
	Conf.			Overall
Team	W		L	W		L
No. 1 Morningside $^	9	–	0	14	–	0
No. 10 Northwestern (IA) ^	8	–	1	9	–	2
Dordt	6	–	3	7	–	4
Midland	6	–	3	7	–	4
Briar Cliff	4	–	5	5	–	6
Doane	4	–	5	4	–	7
Concordia (NE)	3	–	6	3	–	7
Dakota Wesleyan	2	–	7	3	–	8
Jamestown	2	–	7	2	–	9
Hastings	1	–	8	2	–	8
$ – Conference champion; ^ – NAIA playoff participant; Rankings from NAIA Coaches' Poll

The 2019 Morningside Mustangs football team was an American football team that represented Morningside University as a member of the Great Plains Athletic Conference (GPAC) during the 2019 NAIA football season. In their 18th season under head coach Steve Ryan, the Mustangs compiled a perfect 14–0 record (8–0 against GPAC opponents) and won the NAIA national championship, defeating the Marian Knights, 40–38, in the NAIA National Championship Game.

Quarterback Joe Dolincheck completed 295 of 433 passes (68.1%) for 4,303 yards and 49 touchdowns and 12 interceptions. Running back Arnijae Ponder carried the ball 323 times for 1,884 rushing yards and 23 touchdowns.

== Schedule ==
Date	Opponent	Rank	Site	Result	Attendance	Source
August 31	St. Francis (IL)*	No. 1	Elwood Olsen Stadium; Sioux City, IA	W 80–0	1,000	
September 14	Dordt	No. 1	Elwood Olsen Stadium; Sioux City, IA	W 56–14	1,100	
September 21	Midland	No. 1	Elwood Olsen Stadium; Sioux City, IA	W 51–29	5,600	
October 5	at Hastings	No. 1	Lloyd Wilson Field; Hastings, NE	W 69–13		
October 12	at Briar Cliff	No. 1	Memorial Field; Sioux City, IA	W 49–14	1,000	
October 19	Jamestown	No. 1	Elwood Olsen Stadium; Sioux City, IA	W 61–0	1,105	
October 26	at Dakota Wesleyan	No. 1	Joe Quintal Field; Mitchell, SD	W 69–0		
November 2	at Doane	No. 1	Papik Field; Crete, NE	W 42–10	1,000	
November 9	Concordia (NE)	No. 1	Elwood Olsen Stadium; Sioux City, IA	W 52–7	1,050	
November 16	at No. 5 Northwestern (IA)	No. 1	DeValois Stadium; Orange City, IA	W 37–27		
November 23	No. 17 Dickinson State*	No. 1	Elwood Olsen Stadium; Sioux City, IA (NAIA first round)	W 57–14	1,000	
November 30	No. 9 Saint Xavier*	No. 1	Elwood Olsen Stadium; Sioux City, IA (NAIA quarterfinal)	W 51–0	600	
December 7	No. 4 Grand View*	No. 1	Elwood Olsen Stadium; Sioux City, IA (NAIA semifinal)	W 21–16	4,500	
December 21	vs. No. 2 Marian (IN)*	No. 1	Eddie Robinson Stadium; Grambling, LA (NAIA Championship Game)	W 40–38	1,646	
*Non-conference game; Rankings from NAIA Poll released prior to the game
