= 2018 NAIA football season =

American college football season

- National Championship: Daytona Beach Municipal Stadium; Daytona Beach, FL; December 15, 2018
- Champion: Morningside
- Player of the Year: Trent Solsma (quarterback, Morningside)

The 2018 NAIA football season was the component of the 2018 college football season organized by the National Association of Intercollegiate Athletics (NAIA) in the United States. The season's playoffs, known as the NAIA Football National Championship, culminated with the championship game on December 15, at Daytona Beach Municipal Stadium in Daytona Beach, Florida. The Morningside Mustangs defeated the Benedictine Ravens, 35–28, in the title game to win the program's first NAIA championship.

== Conference standings ==
2018 Frontier Conference football standings
	Conf.			Overall
Team	W		L	W		L
No. 16 Rocky Mountain $^	7	–	3	8	–	4
No. 24 Eastern Oregon	6	–	4	6	–	4
Montana Western	6	–	4	6	–	4
Southern Oregon	6	–	4	6	–	4
No. 22 College of Idaho	6	–	4	6	–	5
Montana Tech	5	–	5	5	–	5
Carroll (MT)	4	–	6	5	–	6
Montana State–Northern	0	–	10	1	–	10
$ – Conference champion; ^ – NAIA playoff participant; Rankings from NAIA Coaches' Poll

2018 Great Plains Athletic Conference football standings
	Conf.			Overall
Team	W		L	W		L
No. 1 Morningside $^	9	–	0	15	–	0
No. 12 Northwestern (IA) ^	8	–	1	9	–	2
No. 23 Dordt	6	–	3	7	–	3
Midland	5	–	4	7	–	4
Doane	5	–	4	6	–	4
Briar Cliff	4	–	5	6	–	5
Hastings	3	–	6	5	–	6
Concordia (NE)	2	–	7	3	–	7
Jamestown	2	–	7	3	–	8
Dakota Wesleyan	1	–	8	2	–	9
$ – Conference champion; ^ – NAIA playoff participant; Rankings from NAIA Coaches' Poll

2018 Heart of America Athletic Conference football standings
	Conf.			Overall
Team	W		L	W		L
North
No. 2 Benedictine (KS) x^	5	–	0	13	–	2
No. 15 Grand View ^	4	–	1	8	–	3
Culver–Stockton	2	–	3	4	–	7
William Penn	2	–	3	4	–	7
Peru State	1	–	4	3	–	8
Graceland	1	–	4	1	–	10
South
No. 5 Baker x^	4	–	0	9	–	3
No. 17 Evangel	2	–	2	9	–	2
MidAmerica Nazarene	2	–	2	4	–	7
Central Methodist	1	–	3	4	–	6
Missouri Valley	1	–	3	3	–	7
x – Division champion/co-champions; ^ – NAIA playoff participant; Rankings from NAIA Coaches' Poll

2018 Kansas Collegiate Athletic Conference football standings
	Conf.			Overall
Team	W		L	W		L
No. 4 Kansas Wesleyan $^	10	–	0	12	–	1
No. 20 Ottawa (KS)	8	–	2	8	–	2
Avila	7	–	3	7	–	3
Tabor	6	–	4	6	–	4
Southwestern (KS)	5	–	5	6	–	5
Saint Mary (KS)	4	–	6	4	–	6
Sterling	4	–	6	4	–	6
Bethel (KS)	3	–	7	3	–	7
McPherson	3	–	7	3	–	7
Friends	3	–	7	3	–	8
Bethany (KS)	2	–	8	2	–	9
$ – Conference champion; ^ – NAIA playoff participant; Rankings from NAIA Coaches' Poll

2018 Mid-South Conference football standings
	Conf.			Overall
Team	W		L	W		L
Appalachian Division
No. 11 Reinhardt x^	6	–	0	9	–	2
No. 12 Cumberlands (KY) ^	5	–	1	10	–	2
Pikeville	4	–	2	6	–	5
Point	2	–	4	3	–	8
Bluefield	1	–	4	4	–	7
St. Andrews	1	–	4	2	–	7
Union (KY)	1	–	5	2	–	8
Bluegrass Division
No. 10 Bethel (TN) x^	6	–	0	10	–	1
No. 19 Georgetown (KY)	4	–	2	7	–	3
No. 18 Lindsey Wilson	4	–	2	7	–	3
Cumberland (TN)	3	–	3	5	–	6
Campbellsville	3	–	3	4	–	6
Kentucky Christian	1	–	5	2	–	9
Cincinnati Christian	0	–	6	0	–	11
Sun Division
No. 21 Southeastern x	5	–	1	7	–	3
Ave Maria x	5	–	1	6	–	4
Keiser	4	–	2	6	–	4
Webber International	3	–	3	7	–	3
Edward Waters	2	–	4	4	–	7
Faulkner	1	–	5	4	–	6
Warner	1	–	5	1	–	9
x – Division champion/co-champions; ^ – NAIA playoff participant; Rankings from NAIA Coaches' Poll

2018 Mid-States Football Association standings
	Conf.			Overall
Team	W		L	W		L
Mideast League
No. 9 Marian (IN) x^	6	–	0	10	–	1
No. 6 Concordia (MI) ^	5	–	1	10	–	3
No. 3 Saint Francis (IN) ^	4	–	2	10	–	3
No. 25 Siena Heights	3	–	3	7	–	3
Missouri Baptist	2	–	4	4	–	7
Taylor	1	–	5	3	–	7
Lindenwood–Belleville	0	–	6	0	–	11
Midwest League
No. 7 Saint Xavier x^	5	–	0	9	–	4
Olivet Nazarene	4	–	1	5	–	5
St. Ambrose	3	–	2	6	–	4
St. Francis (IL)	2	–	3	4	–	7
Robert Morris (IL)	1	–	4	2	–	9
Trinity International	0	–	5	1	–	9
x – League champion/co-champions ^ – NAIA playoff participant; Rankings from NAIA Coaches' Poll

2018 North Star Athletic Association football standings
	Conf.			Overall
Team	W		L	W		L
No. 8 Dickinson State $^	6	–	1	9	–	3
Valley City State	5	–	2	6	–	4
Waldorf	5	–	2	5	–	5
Presentation	3	–	4	5	–	5
Dakota State	2	–	5	3	–	8
Mayville State	0	–	7	1	–	9
$ – Conference champion; ^ – NAIA playoff participant; Rankings from NAIA Coaches' Poll

2018 Sooner Athletic Conference football standings
	Conf.			Overall
Team	W		L	W		L
No. 14 Langston $^	8	–	0	9	–	2
OK Panhandle State	6	–	2	6	–	5
Arizona Christian	5	–	3	8	–	3
Ottawa (AZ)	5	–	3	7	–	4
SAGU	4	–	4	5	–	5
Wayland Baptist	3	–	5	5	–	5
Lyon	2	–	6	4	–	7
Texas Wesleyan	2	–	6	2	–	8
Texas College	1	–	7	1	–	7
$ – Conference champion; ^ – NAIA playoff participant; Rankings from NAIA Coaches' Poll

2018 NAIA independents football records
	Conf.			Overall
Team	W		L	W		L
Indiana Wesleyan		–		7	–	3
Lawrence Tech		–		5	–	3
Allen		–		2	–	6
