= Eric Wagoner =

American football player and coach (born c. 1984)

Current position
- Title: Head coach
- Team: Frostburg State
- Conference: MEC
- Record: 32–13

Biographical details
- Born: c. 1984 (age 41–42); Fort Wayne, Indiana, U.S.
- Education: University of Saint Francis (2007, 2011)

Playing career
- 2003–2006: Saint Francis (IN)
- Position: Defensive end

Coaching career (HC unless noted)
- 2007–2012: Saint Francis (IN) (ST)
- 2013–2019: Saint Francis (IN) (DC)
- 2020–2021: Frostburg State (DC)
- 2022–present: Frostburg State

Head coaching record
- Overall: 32–13
- Tournaments: 2–1 (NCAA D-II playoffs)

Accomplishments and honors

Championships
- 1 MEC (2025)

Awards
- MEC Coach of the Year (2025)

Eric Wagoner (born c. 1984) is an American college football coach. He is the head football coach for Frostburg State University, a position he has held since 2022. He also coached for Saint Francis (IN). He played college football for Saint Francis (IN) as a defensive end.

== Head coaching record ==
Year	Team	Overall	Conference	Standing	Bowl/playoffs	AFCA^{#}	D2^{°}
Frostburg State Bobcats (Mountain East Conference) (2022–present)
2022	Frostburg State	8–3	7–3	3rd			
2023	Frostburg State	7–3	6–3	T–2nd			
2024	Frostburg State	6–5	4–5	7th			
2025	Frostburg State	11–2	7–1	T–1st	L NCAA Division II Quarterfinal	14	20
Frostburg State:		32–13	24–12				
Total:		32–13					
