= Trent Solsma =

American football player

Current position
- Title: Offensive coordinator & quarterbacks coach
- Team: Bridgeland HS (TX)

Biographical details
- Born: c. 1990s Dakota Dunes, South Dakota, U.S.
- Education: Morningside College

Playing career
- 2015–2018: Morningside
- Position: Quarterback

Coaching career (HC unless noted)
- 2019: Waltrip HS (TX) (RB)
- 2020–2022: Cinco Ranch HS (TX) (WR/TE)
- 2023–present: Bridgeland HS (TX) (OC/QB)

Accomplishments and honors

Awards
- NAIA national champion (2018); NAIA Player of the Year (2018); NAIA First-team All-American (2018)

Trent Solsma (born 1990s) is a former college football quarterback who played for the Morningside Mustangs.

== Early life and college career ==
Trent Solsma was born in the 1990s in Dakota Dunes, South Dakota. He went to high school at Bishop Heelan Catholic High School, leading them to the state championship in 2013. He set records for: passing yards (453), touchdown passes (6), total touchdowns (7, as Solsma also had a rushing score), and pass completions (23) during the championship game. He was then named to the 2013 All-Metro class.

Solsma played college football at Morningside College. In his senior year, he was named the NAIA Player of the Year after throwing for 5,097 yards and 68 touchdowns, with only 6 interceptions. He also was named First-Team All-American. In his final college football game, the NAIA National Championship, he went 19 for 36 passing, with 292 yards and four touchdowns. With under 1:30 left in the game, he threw a 16-yard pass to Connor Niles to win the championship against Benedictine. He had also thrown a game-winning pass to Niles in the previous game. The Trent Solsma-Connor Niles duo was considered to be one of the most productive duos in NAIA football history.

He threw for 13,739 yards and 169 touchdowns in his career. He is the NAIA's all-time leader in passing touchdowns.

After his college career he became a coach at Cinco Ranch High School.
