= Mount Marty University =

Catholic, Benedictine university in Yankton, South Dakota, US

Coordinates: 42.8750°N 97.4102°W

- Former names: Mount Marty Junior College (1936–1951); Mount Marty College (1951–2020)
- Motto: Awareness of God-Community-Hospitality-Lifelong Learning
- Type: Private university
- Established: 1936
- Religious affiliation: Catholic (Benedictine)
- President: Marcus Long
- Provost: Bill Miller
- Students: 1,308 (fall 2025)
- Undergraduates: 1,053 (fall 2025)
- Postgraduates: 255 (fall 2025)
- Location: Yankton, South Dakota, U.S.
- Campus: 80 acres (32 ha)
- Colors: Navy Blue & Gold
- Nickname: Lancers
- Sporting affiliations: NAIA – GPAC
- Mascot: Benedict The Lancer
- Website: mountmarty.edu

Mount Marty University is a private Benedictine university in Yankton, South Dakota.

== Name ==
Mount Marty was named after Martin Marty, Bishop of the Diocese of Sioux Falls and the Diocese of Saint Cloud.

== Campus ==
Mount Marty University is in Yankton, South Dakota, a town of 15,000 people. Located on the bluffs of the Missouri River, the 80-acre campus has a mix of modern and historic buildings. The university also has locations in Watertown and Sioux Falls.

== Athletics ==
The Mount Marty athletic teams are called the Lancers. The university is a member of the National Association of Intercollegiate Athletics (NAIA), primarily competing in the Great Plains Athletic Conference (GPAC) since the 2000–01 academic year. The Lancers previously competed in the defunct South Dakota Intercollegiate Conference (SDIC) from 1995–96 to 1999–2000.

Mount Marty competes in 22 intercollegiate varsity sports. Men's sports include baseball, basketball, cross country, football, golf, soccer, tennis and track & field (indoor and outdoor); while women's sports include basketball, cross country, golf, soccer, softball, tennis, track & field (indoor and outdoor) and volleyball; and co-ed sports include archery, competitive cheer, competitive dance and shotgun sports.

The primary athletic rival for the Lancers is the Dakota Wesleyan University Tigers.
