= 2018 Morningside Mustangs football team =

American college football season

2018 Morningside Mustangs football

NAIA national champion GPAC champion

NAIA National Championship Game, W 35–28 vs. Benedictine (KS)
- Conference: Great Plains Athletic Conference
- Record: 15–0 (9–0 GPAC)
- Head coach: Steve Ryan (17th season)
- Co-defensive coordinators: Casey Jacobsen (8th season); Nathan Turner (8th season)
- Home stadium: Elwood Olsen Stadium

2018 Great Plains Athletic Conference football standings
	Conf.			Overall
Team	W		L	W		L
No. 1 Morningside $^	9	–	0	15	–	0
No. 12 Northwestern (IA) ^	8	–	1	9	–	2
No. 23 Dordt	6	–	3	7	–	3
Midland	5	–	4	7	–	4
Doane	5	–	4	6	–	4
Briar Cliff	4	–	5	6	–	5
Hastings	3	–	6	5	–	6
Concordia (NE)	2	–	7	3	–	7
Jamestown	2	–	7	3	–	8
Dakota Wesleyan	1	–	8	2	–	9
$ – Conference champion; ^ – NAIA playoff participant; Rankings from NAIA Coaches' Poll

The 2018 Morningside Mustangs football team was an American football team that represented Morningside University as a member of the Great Plains Athletic Conference (GPAC) during the 2018 NAIA football season. In their 17th season under head coach Steve Ryan, the Mustangs compiled a perfect 15–0 record (9–0 against GPAC opponents) and won the NAIA national championship, defeating the Benedictine Ravens, 35–28, in the NAIA National Championship Game.

== Schedule ==
Date	Opponent	Rank	Site	Result	Attendance	Source
August 25	William Penn*	No. 3	Elwood Olsen Stadium; Sioux City, IA	W 49–21	1,100	
September 8	at Truman State*	No. 3	Stokes Stadium; Kirksville, MO	W 35–17	1,543	
September 22	at Dakota Wesleyan	No. 2	Joe Quintal Field; Mitchell, SD	W 66–13		
September 29	at Hastings	No. 2	Hastings, NE	W 65–0		
October 6	at Midland	No. 1	Heedum Field; Fremont, NE	W 77–21	1,200	
October 13	Doane	No. 1	Elwood Olsen Stadium; Sioux City, IA	W 69–17		
October 20	at No. 3 Northwestern (IA)	No. 1	Orange City, IA	W 42–34		
October 27	Concordia (NE)	No. 1	Elwood Olsen Stadium; Sioux City, IA	W 49–0		
November 3	Dordt	No. 1	Elwood Olsen Stadium; Sioux City, IA	W 63–21	600	
November 10	at Jamestown	No. 1	Jamestown, ND	W 49–13		
November 17	No. 16 Rocky Mountain*	No. 1	Elwood Olsen Stadium; Sioux City, IA (NAIA first round)	W 49–20	750	
November 24	No. 17 Saint Xavier*	No. 1	Elwood Olsen Stadium; Sioux City, IA (NAIA quarterfinal)	W 51–14	800	
December 1	No. 8 Saint Francis (IN)*	No. 1	Elwood Olsen Stadium; Sioux City, IA (NAIA semifinal)	W 34–28 ^{OT}	2,000	
December 15	No. 7 Benedictine (KS)*	No. 1	Daytona Beach Municipal Stadium; Daytona Beach, FL (NAIA Championship Game)	W 35–28		
*Non-conference game; Rankings from NAIA Poll released prior to the game
