= 2019 NAIA football season =

American college football season

- Regular season: August 24 – November 16, 2019
- Postseason: November 23 – December 21, 2019
- National Championship: Eddie Robinson Stadium; Grambing, LA; December 21, 2019
- Champion: Morningside
- Player of the Year: Charles Salary (running back, Marian (IN))

The 2019 NAIA football season was the component of the 2019 college football season organized by the National Association of Intercollegiate Athletics (NAIA) in the United States. The season's playoffs, known as the NAIA Football National Championship, culminated with the championship game on December 21 at Eddie Robinson Stadium in Grambling, Louisiana. The Morningside Mustangs defeated the Marian Knights, 40–38, in the title game to win the program's second consecutive NAIA championship.

== Conference changes and new programs ==
=== Membership changes ===
| School | Former conference | New conference |
|---|---|---|
| Benedictine Ravens | HAAC North | HAAC South |
| Cincinnati Christian Eagles | Mid-South Bluegrass | Mid-South Appalachian |
| Clarke Pride | New program | HAAC North |
| Cumberlands Patriots | Mid-South Appalachian | Mid-South Bluegrass |
| Edward Waters Tigers | Mid-South Sun | Independent |
| Indiana Wesleyan Wildcats | Independent | MSFA Mideast |
| Kentucky Christian Knights | Mid-South Bluegrass | Mid-South Appalachian |
| Lawrence Tech Blue Devils | Independent | MSFA Mideast |
| Lindenwood (IL) Lynx | MSFA Mideast | Dropped football |
| Missouri Baptist Spartans | MSFA Mideast | MSFA Midwest |
| Pikeville Bears | Mid-South Appalachian | Mid-South Bluegrass |
| St. Thomas Bobcats | New program | Mid-South Sun |
| Thomas More Saints | Independent (NCAA D-III) | Mid-South Bluegrass |

Ottawa (AZ) became eligible for the postseason. Thomas More, which had been an NAIA member from 1947 until leaving for the NCAA in 1990, was immediately eligible for NAIA postseason play as a returning member. Cincinnati Christian ceased to exist during the season.

== Conference standings ==
2019 Frontier Conference football standings
| | Conf. | | | Overall |
| Team | W | | L | W | | L |
|---|---|---|---|---|---|---|
| No. 5 College of Idaho $^ | 10 | – | 0 | 11 | – | 1 |
| No. 22 Montana Western | 7 | – | 3 | 7 | – | 3 |
| No. 25 Carroll (MT) | 6 | – | 4 | 6 | – | 4 |
| Montana Tech | 6 | – | 4 | 6 | – | 4 |
| Eastern Oregon | 4 | – | 6 | 4 | – | 7 |
| Southern Oregon | 4 | – | 6 | 4 | – | 7 |
| Rocky Mountain | 3 | – | 7 | 4 | – | 7 |
| Montana State–Northern | 0 | – | 10 | 1 | – | 10 |
$ – Conference champion; ^ – NAIA playoff participant; Rankings from NAIA Coaches' Poll

2019 Great Plains Athletic Conference football standings
| | Conf. | | | Overall |
| Team | W | | L | W | | L |
|---|---|---|---|---|---|---|
| No. 1 Morningside $^ | 9 | – | 0 | 14 | – | 0 |
| No. 10 Northwestern (IA) ^ | 8 | – | 1 | 9 | – | 2 |
| Dordt | 6 | – | 3 | 7 | – | 4 |
| Midland | 6 | – | 3 | 7 | – | 4 |
| Briar Cliff | 4 | – | 5 | 5 | – | 6 |
| Doane | 4 | – | 5 | 4 | – | 7 |
| Concordia (NE) | 3 | – | 6 | 3 | – | 7 |
| Dakota Wesleyan | 2 | – | 7 | 3 | – | 8 |
| Jamestown | 2 | – | 7 | 2 | – | 9 |
| Hastings | 1 | – | 8 | 2 | – | 8 |
$ – Conference champion; ^ – NAIA playoff participant; Rankings from NAIA Coaches' Poll

2019 Heart of America Athletic Conference football standings
| | Conf. | | | Overall |
| Team | W | | L | | W | | L |
|---|---|---|---|---|---|---|---|---|
North
| No. 3 Grand View x^ | 5 | – | 0 | | 13 | – | 1 |
| Culver–Stockton | 4 | – | 1 | | 6 | – | 5 |
| William Penn | 2 | – | 3 | 4 | – | 6 | – | 1 |
| Clarke | 2 | – | 3 | | 2 | – | 9 |
| Peru State | 2 | – | 3 | | 2 | – | 9 |
| Graceland | 0 | – | 5 | | 0 | – | 11 |
South
| No. 14 Baker x^ | 5 | – | 0 | | 9 | – | 3 |
| No. 18 Benedictine (KS) | 3 | – | 2 | | 8 | – | 3 |
| No. 20 Evangel | 3 | – | 2 | | 8 | – | 3 |
| MidAmerica Nazarene | 2 | – | 3 | | 7 | – | 4 |
| Central Methodist | 2 | – | 3 | 5 | – | 5 | – | 1 |
| Missouri Valley | 0 | – | 5 | | 3 | – | 8 |
x – Division champion/co-champions; ^ – NAIA playoff participant; Rankings from NAIA Coaches' Poll

2019 Kansas Collegiate Athletic Conference football standings
| | Conf. | | | Overall |
| Team | W | | L | W | | L |
|---|---|---|---|---|---|---|
| No. 6 Kansas Wesleyan $^ | 10 | – | 0 | 12 | – | 1 |
| No. 24 Bethel (KS) | 7 | – | 3 | 8 | – | 3 |
| Avila | 7 | – | 3 | 7 | – | 3 |
| Sterling | 7 | – | 3 | 7 | – | 3 |
| Tabor | 5 | – | 5 | 6 | – | 5 |
| McPherson | 5 | – | 5 | 5 | – | 6 |
| Southwestern (KS) | 5 | – | 5 | 5 | – | 6 |
| Bethany (KS) | 4 | – | 6 | 4 | – | 6 |
| Friends | 3 | – | 7 | 3 | – | 7 |
| Ottawa (KS) | 2 | – | 8 | 2 | – | 8 |
| Saint Mary (KS) | 0 | – | 10 | 0 | – | 11 |
$ – Conference champion; ^ – NAIA playoff participant; Rankings from NAIA Coaches' Poll

2019 Mid-South Conference football standings
| | Conf. | | | Overall |
| Team | W | | L | W | | L |
|---|---|---|---|---|---|---|
Appalachian Division
| No. 13 Reinhardt x^ | 6 | – | 0 | 9 | – | 3 |
| St. Andrews | 5 | – | 1 | 5 | – | 5 |
| Point | 4 | – | 2 | 5 | – | 7 |
| Bluefield | 3 | – | 3 | 4 | – | 7 |
| Kentucky Christian | 2 | – | 4 | 3 | – | 8 |
| Cincinnati Christian * | 1 | – | 5 | 2 | – | 9 |
| Union (KY) | 0 | – | 6 | 0 | – | 11 |
Bluegrass Division
| No. 4 Lindsey Wilson x^ | 7 | – | 0 | 12 | – | 1 |
| No. 7 Cumberlands (KY) ^ | 6 | – | 1 | 10 | – | 2 |
| Pikeville | 4 | – | 3 | 6 | – | 5 |
| Georgetown (KY) | 4 | – | 3 | 5 | – | 5 |
| Cumberland (TN) | 3 | – | 4 | 5 | – | 5 |
| Bethel (TN) | 2 | – | 5 | 5 | – | 6 |
| Thomas More | 2 | – | 5 | 4 | – | 7 |
| Campbellsville | 0 | – | 7 | 1 | – | 9 |
Sun Division
| No. 9 Keiser x^ | 6 | – | 0 | 9 | – | 1 |
| No. 15 Southeastern | 5 | – | 1 | 8 | – | 1 |
| Ave Maria | 3 | – | 3 | 5 | – | 5 |
| St. Thomas (FL) | 2 | – | 4 | 4 | – | 6 |
| Webber International | 2 | – | 4 | 3 | – | 6 |
| Warner | 2 | – | 4 | 3 | – | 7 |
| Faulkner | 1 | – | 5 | 3 | – | 6 |
x – Division champion/co-champions; ^ – NAIA playoff participant * – Cincinnati Christian announced its closure mid-season and forfeited its three remaining games.; Rankings from NAIA Coaches' Poll

2019 Mid-States Football Association standings
| | Conf. | | | Overall |
| Team | W | | L | W | | L |
|---|---|---|---|---|---|---|
Mideast League
| No. 2 Marian (IN) x^ | 6 | – | 0 | 12 | – | 1 |
| No. 12 Concordia (MI) ^ | 4 | – | 2 | 8 | – | 3 |
| No. 11 Saint Francis (IN) ^ | 4 | – | 2 | 7 | – | 3 |
| No. 20 Siena Heights | 3 | – | 3 | 7 | – | 3 |
| Indiana Wesleyan | 3 | – | 3 | 6 | – | 4 |
| Taylor | 1 | – | 5 | 3 | – | 7 |
| Lawrence Tech | 0 | – | 6 | 1 | – | 9 |
Midwest League
| No. 8 Saint Xavier x^ | 6 | – | 0 | 9 | – | 3 |
| Olivet Nazarene | 4 | – | 2 | 6 | – | 5 |
| Robert Morris (IL) | 4 | – | 2 | 5 | – | 5 |
| St. Ambrose | 4 | – | 2 | 4 | – | 5 |
| St. Francis (IL) | 2 | – | 4 | 3 | – | 8 |
| Missouri Baptist | 1 | – | 5 | 2 | – | 9 |
| Trinity International | 0 | – | 6 | 1 | – | 10 |
x – League champion/co-champions ^ – NAIA playoff participant; Rankings from NAIA Coaches' Poll

2019 North Star Athletic Association football standings
| | Conf. | | | Overall |
| Team | W | | L | W | | L |
|---|---|---|---|---|---|---|
| No. 17 Dickinson State $^ | 6 | – | 1 | 8 | – | 3 |
| Valley City State | 5 | – | 2 | 7 | – | 3 |
| No. 23 Waldorf | 5 | – | 2 | 7 | – | 3 |
| Dakota State | 3 | – | 4 | 5 | – | 5 |
| Mayville State | 1 | – | 6 | 2 | – | 8 |
| Presentation | 1 | – | 6 | 1 | – | 9 |
$ – Conference champion; ^ – NAIA playoff participant; Rankings from NAIA Coaches' Poll

2019 Sooner Athletic Conference football standings
| | Conf. | | | Overall |
| Team | W | | L | W | | L |
|---|---|---|---|---|---|---|
| No. 16 Ottawa (AZ) +^ | 7 | – | 1 | 9 | – | 2 |
| No. 19 Langston + | 7 | – | 1 | 8 | – | 2 |
| Lyon | 6 | – | 2 | 7 | – | 3 |
| Arizona Christian | 6 | – | 2 | 6 | – | 4 |
| Wayland Baptist | 3 | – | 5 | 4 | – | 6 |
| OK Panhandle State | 3 | – | 5 | 3 | – | 7 |
| Texas Wesleyan | 3 | – | 5 | 3 | – | 7 |
| Texas College | 1 | – | 7 | 1 | – | 9 |
| SAGU | 0 | – | 8 | 0 | – | 10 |
+ – Conference co-champions; ^ – NAIA playoff participant; Rankings from NAIA Coaches' Poll

2019 NAIA independents football records
| | Conf. | | | Overall |
| Team | W | | L | W | | L |
|---|---|---|---|---|---|---|
| Allen | | – | | 3 | – | 6 |
| Edward Waters | | – | | 1 | – | 10 |

== See also ==
- 2019 NCAA Division I FBS football season
- 2019 NCAA Division I FCS football season
- 2019 NCAA Division II football season
- 2019 NCAA Division III football season
