= Morningside University =

Methodist university in Sioux City, Iowa, US

- Former name: Morningside College (1894–2021)
- Type: Private university
- Established: December 5, 1894; 131 years ago
- Religious affiliation: United Methodist Church
- Endowment: $63.1 million (2025)
- President: Chad Benson, Interim President
- Faculty: 250
- Total staff: 250
- Students: 2,500
- Location: Sioux City, Iowa, United States; 43°31′36.7″N 96°44′13.3″W
- Campus: Urban 100 acres (0.40 km^{2})
- Colors: Maroon & White
- Nickname: Mustangs
- Sporting affiliations: NAIA – GPAC
- Mascot: Monte the Mustang
- Website: www.morningside.edu
- Morningside College Historic District
- U.S. National Register of Historic Places
- U.S. Historic district
- Location within Iowa Location within the United States
- Location: Roughly bounded by Vine, Morningside, Garretson, Peters, and S. Paxton Aves. and Sioux Trail
- Coordinates: 42°28′28″N 96°21′42″W
- Area: 41 acres (17 ha)
- Architect: Charles P. Brown
- Architectural style: Romanesque Revival; Late 19th and 20th Century Revivals
- NRHP reference No.: 97000387
- Added to NRHP: May 14, 1997

Morningside University is a private university affiliated with the United Methodist Church and located in Sioux City, Iowa, United States. Founded in 1894 by the Methodist Episcopal Church, Morningside University has 21 buildings on a 68-acre (280,000 m^{2}) campus in Sioux City (area population 143,157 in 2008). The Morningside College Historic District, which includes most of the campus, is on the National Register of Historic Places. Morningside College officially became Morningside University on June 1, 2021.

== History ==
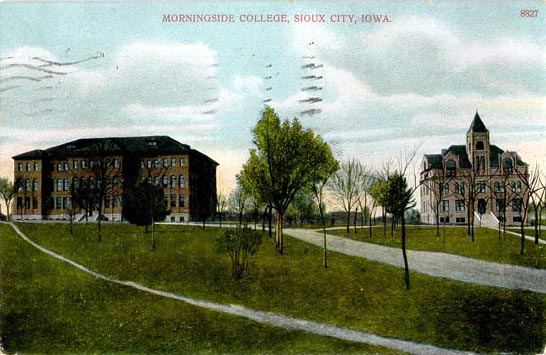
Morningside College in the 1910s. The building on the left is known today as Lewis Hall, while on the right is Charles City Hall

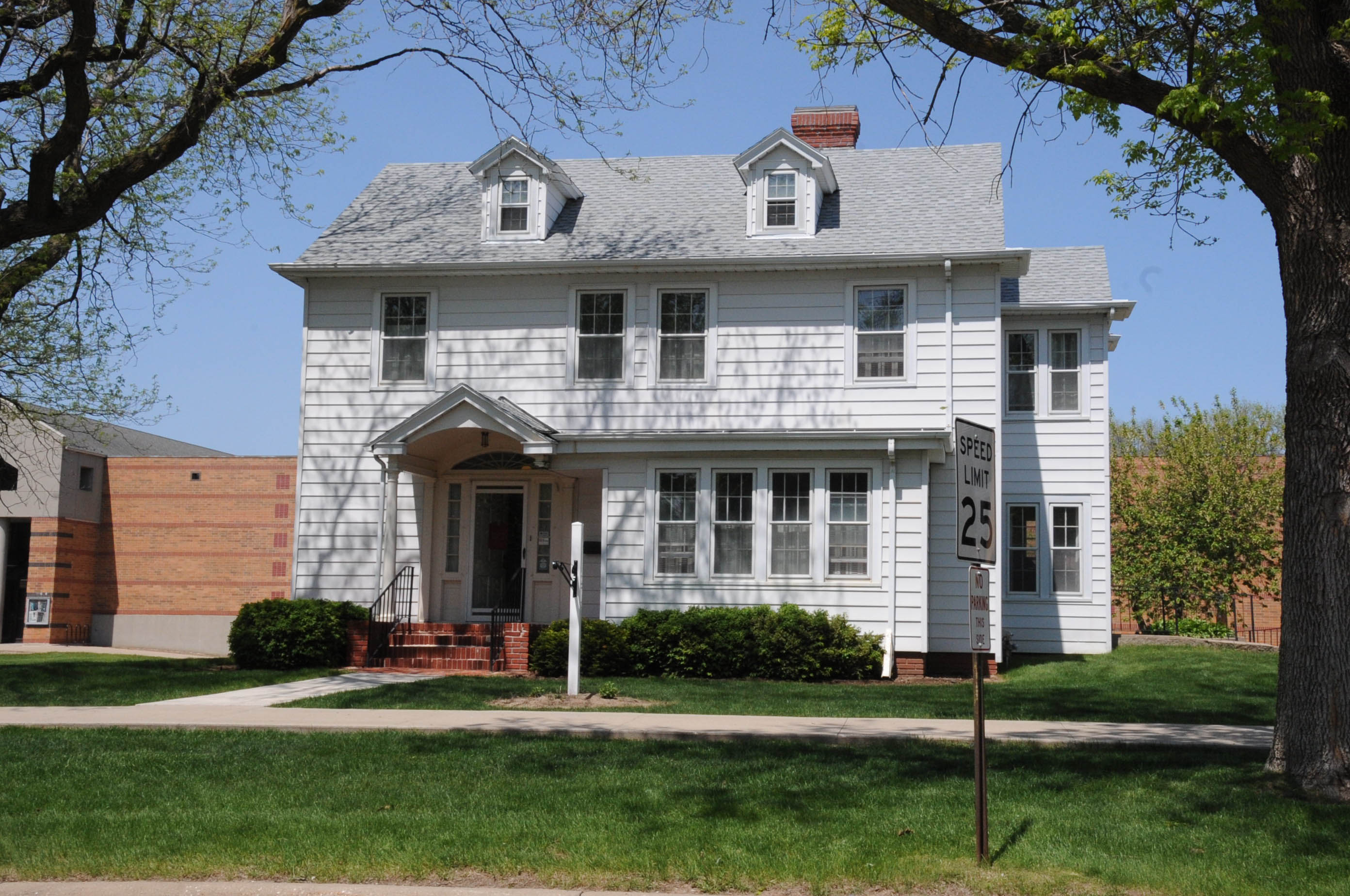
Lillian Dimmitt House (1921)

A group of Sioux City business leaders and Methodist ministers established the University of the Northwest in 1889 to provide educational, cultural and economic growth in the community. The location of the campus was the northern section of the farm of Edwin C. Peters, the founder of the suburb of Morningside. The university was plagued with financial problems, and it became a victim of the financial Panic of 1893. It closed in 1894, the same year that the Methodist Episcopal Church incorporated Morningside College and took over the campus. Charles City College in Charles City, Iowa, was a German Methodist college that was absorbed into Morningside College in 1914.

Having first started graduate programs in the 1960s, Morningside College became Morningside University in 2021, following the launch of a Doctor in Nursing Practice program in 2019. The university continued its growth with the launch of a masters' in business administration (MBA) program in 2024, with the business program growth prompting a new facility construction in 2026. In 2026, St. Luke's College, a 127 year-old nursing college in Sioux City, agreed to acquisition by Morningside.

== Campus ==
=== Residence halls ===
Dimmitt Hall is the third oldest building on campus. It was named for Lillian Dimmitt, the 26-year Dean of Women. Roadman Hall was built in the mid twentieth century. It houses about 150 students. The dormitory is named after Earl Roadman, president of the college from 1936 to 1956. In 2005, two apartment-style dormitories opened for upperclassmen, the Waitt and Poppen Halls. Lags Hall, a third apartment-style facility, was added in 2007.

=== Historic district ===
Part of the campus has been set aside in 1997 as a historic district listed on the National Register of Historic Places. At the time of its nomination it contained 26 resources, which included nine contributing buildings, one contributing site, five contributing objects, nine non-contributing buildings, and one non-contributing object. The focus of the district is a broad hilltop that overlooks the Missouri River valley. Charles City College Hall (1890), Lewis Hall (1900), the Vice President's House (pre-1914), Hickman-Johnson-Furrow Library (1914), Lillian Dimmitt House (1921), Dimmitt Residence Hall (1926), Jones Hall of Science (1948), Alice Gymnasium (1949), Roadman Hall (1953), and O'Donoghue Observatory (1953) are the contributing buildings. The contributing objects are The Spoonholder (1908), a curved cement bench with footpad and backrest; Class of 1922 Sundial; and the three Harmony Lane Lampposts.

This is the largest concentration of educational buildings in Sioux City, and it also contains some of the best examples of Richardsonian Romanesque, Italianate, and Moderne architecture in the city. The district is also linked to the Morningside neighborhood, which was developed as a streetcar suburb. When the University of the Northwest was being developed, there was a conscious effort to pattern it and the neighborhood after Northwestern University and Evanston, Illinois.

== Athletics ==
The Morningside athletic teams are called the Mustangs (formerly known as the "Maroon Chiefs"). The university is a member of the National Association of Intercollegiate Athletics (NAIA), primarily competing in the Great Plains Athletic Conference (GPAC) since the 2003–04 academic year. The Mustangs previously competed as an NAIA Independent during the 2002–03 school year; and in the defunct North Central Conference (NCC) from 1922–2002, which was affiliated in the NCAA Division II ranks.

Morningside competes in 28 intercollegiate varsity sports: men's sports include baseball, basketball, bowling, cross country, football, golf, soccer, swimming, tennis, indoor track and field, outdoor track and field, volleyball, and wrestling; women's sports include basketball, bowling, cross country, golf, soccer, softball, swimming, tennis, indoor track and field, outdoor track and field, volleyball, and wrestling; and co-ed sports include cheerleading, dance, and eSports.

=== Accomplishments ===
The Mustangs women's basketball team won back-to-back NAIA Division II National Championships in 2004 and 2005. They also won the National Championship in 2009 with an undefeated 38–0 record. Most recently, the Mustangs won the NAIA Division II Women's Basketball National Championship in 2015 with a 37–1 record. Morningside's Jake Stevenson won the NAIA 184 lb (83 kg) Wrestling Championship in 2007, and John Sievert won the 197 lb (89 kg) Championship in 2013. The football team was coached from 1948–1950 by Pro Football Hall of Fame coach George Allen.

The 2018, 2019, and 2021 Morningside Mustangs football teams had undefeated seasons and won NAIA national championships. The Morningside Mustangs dance team won their first national title in 2022. The dance team also set a national record for highest score at a dance nationals with a 92.31.

== Student life ==
Morningside University is on a 68-acre (280,000 m^{2}) campus in the residential neighborhood of Morningside in Sioux City, Iowa. Student organizations include: student government, honor societies, service groups, religious organizations, musical ensembles, student publications, and three national fraternities (Alpha Omicron Pi women's sorority, Delta Sigma Phi fraternity, and Acacia). The campus is also home to two national music fraternities, Phi Mu Alpha Sinfonia (men's) and Mu Phi Epsilon (co-ed nationally, but strictly women for this campus). Morningside's Department of Mass Communications has a weekly newspaper, the Collegian Reporter, it shares a public-access television cable TV as MCTV, and operates a radio station 24 hours a day at 92.9 on the FM dial, KMSC, Fusion 93.

== Notable alumni ==
- Shirley Booz, dancer and model
- George Everett "Bud" Day, a retired colonel in the United States Air Force and recipient of the Medal of Honor.
- Kory DeHaan, MLB outfielder
- Catelin Drey, state senator
- Anthony Fieldings, football player
- Ira N. Gabrielson, first director of the U.S. Fish and Wildlife Service
- Stanley L. Greigg, member of the U.S. House of Representatives from northwestern Iowa
- Matthew C. Harrison, 13th and current president of the Lutheran Church–Missouri Synod
- Daryl Hecht, Justice of the Iowa Supreme Court
- Jerry Johnson, football player
- William G. Kirchner, Minnesota state legislator
- Gayle Knief, football player
- Utu Abe Malae, Gubernatorial Candidate in American Samoa
- Herb McMath, former NFL defensive tackle
- Al McIntosh, editor who was featured in Ken Burns' The War
- Emory Parnell, actor
- Pauline Phillips and Eppie Lederer, identical twin sisters of the notable newspaper columns "Dear Abby" and "Ask Ann Landers", are Morningside College alumni. Known as the "Friedman twins" during their time at Morningside, they wrote for the school's long-running newspaper, the Collegian Reporter
- Cory Roberts, President, CEO, and Chairman of the board of Propath
- Harry E. Siman, member of the Nebraska Legislature
- Trent Solsma, football player
- Paul Splittorff, baseball player
- Samuel A. Stouffer, sociologist
- Harry Webber, football player
- Brandon Wegher, football player
- Carl O. Wegner, Minnesota state legislator
