= NAIA football national championship =

Football championship game

- In operation: 1956–present
- Preceded by: Small college polls & NAIA Division II Championship
- Number of playoff teams: 20
- Championship trophy: Tom Osborne Trophy
- Television partner(s): ESPN3
- Most playoff championships: Texas A&M–Kingsville (7)
- Current champion: Grand View (3)
- Website: NAIA Football

The NAIA football national championship is decided by a postseason playoff system featuring the best National Association of Intercollegiate Athletics (NAIA) college football teams in the United States. Under sponsorship of the NAIA, the championship game has been played annually since 1956.

== History ==
The NAIA has contested a national championship game since 1956. In 1970, NAIA football was divided into two divisions based on enrollment, Division I and Division II, with a championship game played in each division. In 1997, NAIA football was again consolidated back into one division.

NAIA schools are allowed to offer 24 full varsity football scholarships, which can be divided up as they wish. Scholarships awarded to junior varsity players or players who do not compete in varsity competitions, do not count towards the total.

Texas A&I (now known as Texas A&M–Kingsville) is still the most prolific program with seven NAIA championships, despite having been in NCAA Division II since 1980. Carroll College of Montana is the most successful team still playing in the NAIA, with six national titles.

Grand View is the current champion, having defeated Keiser in the 2025 title game, 22–16.

== Game name ==
Over the years, the NAIA championship games were played under a variety of names:

- Aluminum Bowl (1956)
- Holiday Bowl (1957–1960) (Note: Not to be confused with the NCAA Division I bowl of the same name.)
- Camellia Bowl (1961–1963) (Note: Not to be confused with the later Camellia Bowl (now Salute to Veterans Bowl) contested in Montgomery, Alabama.)
- Champion Bowl (1964–1976 and 1980–1996, Division I games only)
- Apple Bowl (1977, Division I game only)
- Palm Bowl (1978–1979, Division I games only)

== Results ==
Season	Date	Champion	Score	Runner-up	Location	Winning head coach(es)
1956	December 22, 1956	Montana State; Saint Joseph's (IN)	0–0 (Note: Game ended in a tie with both teams as co-champions.)		Little Rock, Arkansas	Tony Storti; Bob Jauron
1957	December 21, 1957	Pittsburg State	27–26	Hillsdale	Saint Petersburg, Florida	Carnie Smith
1958	December 20, 1958	Northeastern State	19–13	Arizona State–Flagstaff	Saint Petersburg, Florida	Harold "Tuffy" Stratton
1959	December 19, 1959	Texas A&I	20–7	Lenoir–Rhyne	Saint Petersburg, Florida	Gil Steinke
1960	December 17, 1960	Lenoir–Rhyne	15–14	Humboldt State	Saint Petersburg, Florida	Clarence Stasavich
1961	December 9, 1961	Pittsburg State	12–7	Linfield	Sacramento, California	Carnie Smith
1962	December 8, 1962	Central State (OK)	28–13	Lenoir–Rhyne	Sacramento, California	Al Blevins
1963	December 14, 1963	Saint John's (MN)	33–27	Prairie View A&M	Sacramento, California	John Gagliardi
1964	December 12, 1964	Concordia (MN); Sam Houston State	7–7		Augusta, Georgia	Jake Christiansen; Paul Pierce
1965	December 11, 1965	Saint John's (MN)	33–0	Linfield	Augusta, Georgia	John Gagliardi
1966	December 10, 1966	Waynesburg	42–21	Wisconsin–Whitewater	Tulsa, Oklahoma	Carl DePasqua
1967	December 9, 1967	Fairmont State	28–21	Eastern Washington	Morgantown, West Virginia	Harold "Deacon" Duvall
1968	December 14, 1968	Troy State	43–35	Texas A&I	Montgomery, Alabama	Billy Atkins
1969	December 13, 1969	Texas A&I	32–7	Concordia (MN)	Kingsville, Texas	Gil Steinke
1970	December 12, 1970	Texas A&I	48–7	Wofford	Greenville, South Carolina	Gil Steinke
1971	December 11, 1971	Livingston	14–12	Arkansas Tech	Birmingham, Alabama	Mickey Andrews
1972	December 9, 1972	East Texas State	21–18	Carson–Newman	Commerce, Texas	Ernest Hawkins
1973	December 8, 1973	Abilene Christian	42–14	Elon	Shreveport, Louisiana	Wally Bullington
1974	December 14, 1974	Texas A&I	34–23	Henderson State	Kingsville, Texas	Gil Steinke
1975	December 13, 1975	Texas A&I	37–0	Salem	Kingsville, Texas	Gil Steinke
1976	December 11, 1976	Texas A&I	26–0	Central Arkansas	Kingsville, Texas	Gil Steinke
1977	December 10, 1977	Abilene Christian	24–7	Southwestern Oklahoma State	Seattle, Washington	DeWitt Jones
1978	December 16, 1978	Angelo State	34–14	Elon	McAllen, Texas	Jim Hess
1979	December 15, 1979	Texas A&I	20–14	Central State (OK)	McAllen, Texas	Ron Harms
1980	December 20, 1980	Elon	17–10	Northeastern State	Burlington, North Carolina	Jerry Tolley
1981	December 19, 1981	Elon	3–0	Pittsburg State	Burlington, North Carolina	Jerry Tolley
1982	December 18, 1982	Central State (OK)	14–11	Mesa State	Edmond, Oklahoma	Gary Howard
1983	December 17, 1983	Carson–Newman	36–28	Mesa State	Grand Junction, Colorado	Ken Sparks
1984	December 15, 1984	Carson–Newman; Central Arkansas	19–19		Conway, Arkansas	Ken Sparks; Harold Horton
1985	December 21, 1985	Hillsdale; Central Arkansas	10–10		Conway, Arkansas	Dick Lowry; Harold Horton
1986	December 20, 1986	Carson–Newman	17–0	Cameron	Jefferson City, Tennessee	Ken Sparks
1987	December 19, 1987	Cameron	30–2	Carson–Newman	Lawton, Oklahoma	Brian Naber
1988	December 17, 1988	Carson–Newman	56–21	Adams State	Jefferson City, Tennessee	Ken Sparks
1989	December 16, 1989	Carson–Newman	34–20	Emporia State	Jefferson City, Tennessee	Ken Sparks
1990	December 8, 1990	Central State (OH)	38–16	Mesa State	Grand Junction, Colorado	Billy Joe
1991	December 14, 1991	Central Arkansas	19–16	Central State (OH)	Wilberforce, Ohio	Mike Isom
1992	December 12, 1992	Central State (OH)	19–16	Gardner–Webb	Boiling Springs, North Carolina	Billy Joe
1993	December 11, 1993	East Central	49–35	Glenville State	Ada, Oklahoma	Hank Walbrick
1994	December 10, 1994	Northeastern State	13–12	Arkansas–Pine Bluff	Pine Bluff, Arkansas	Tom Eckert
1995	December 2, 1995	Central State (OH)	37–7	Northeastern State	Tahlequah, Oklahoma	Rick Comegy
1996	December 7, 1996	Southwestern Oklahoma State	33–31	Montana Tech	Weatherford, Oklahoma	Paul Sharp
1997	December 20, 1997	Findlay	14–7	Willamette	Savannah, Tennessee	Dick Strahm
1998	December 19, 1998	Azusa Pacific	17–14	Olivet Nazarene	Savannah, Tennessee	Vic Shealy
1999	December 18, 1999	Northwestern Oklahoma State	34–26	Georgetown (KY)	Savannah, Tennessee	Tim Albin
2000	December 16, 2000	Georgetown (KY)	20–0	Northwestern Oklahoma State	Savannah, Tennessee	Bill Cronin
2001	December 15, 2001	Georgetown (KY)	49–27	Sioux Falls	Savannah, Tennessee	Bill Cronin
2002	December 21, 2002	Carroll (MT)	28–7	Georgetown (KY)	Savannah, Tennessee	Mike Van Diest
2003	December 20, 2003	Carroll (MT)	41–28	Northwestern Oklahoma State	Savannah, Tennessee	Mike Van Diest
2004	December 18, 2004	Carroll (MT)	15–13 (2 OT)	Saint Francis (IN)	Savannah, Tennessee	Mike Van Diest
2005	December 17, 2005	Carroll (MT)	27–10	Saint Francis (IN)	Savannah, Tennessee	Mike Van Diest
2006	December 16, 2006	Sioux Falls	23–19	Saint Francis (IN)	Savannah, Tennessee	Kalen DeBoer
2007	December 15, 2007	Carroll (MT)	17–9	Sioux Falls	Savannah, Tennessee	Mike Van Diest
2008	December 20, 2008	Sioux Falls	23–7	Carroll (MT)	Rome, Georgia	Kalen DeBoer
2009	December 19, 2009	Sioux Falls	25–22	Lindenwood	Rome, Georgia	Kalen DeBoer
2010	December 18, 2010	Carroll (MT)	10–7	Sioux Falls	Rome, Georgia	Mike Van Diest
2011	December 17, 2011	Saint Xavier	24–20	Carroll (MT)	Rome, Georgia	Mike Feminis
2012	December 13, 2012	Marian (IN)	30–27 (OT)	Morningside	Rome, Georgia	Ted Karras Jr.
2013	December 21, 2013	Grand View	35–23	Cumberlands (KY)	Rome, Georgia	Mike Woodley
2014	December 19, 2014	Southern Oregon	55–31	Marian (IN)	Daytona Beach, Florida	Craig Howard
2015	December 19, 2015	Marian (IN)	31–14	Southern Oregon	Daytona Beach, Florida	Mark Henninger
2016	December 17, 2016	Saint Francis (IN)	38–17	Baker	Daytona Beach, Florida	Kevin Donley
2017	December 16, 2017	Saint Francis (IN)	24–13	Reinhardt	Daytona Beach, Florida	Kevin Donley
2018	December 15, 2018	Morningside	35–28	Benedictine	Daytona Beach, Florida	Steve Ryan
2019	December 21, 2019	Morningside	40–38	Marian (IN)	Grambling, Louisiana	Steve Ryan
2020 (Note: Game played in spring 2021 due to the COVID-19 pandemic.)	May 10, 2021	Lindsey Wilson	45–13	Northwestern (IA)	Grambling, Louisiana	Chris Oliver
2021	December 18, 2021	Morningside	38–28	Grand View	Durham, North Carolina	Steve Ryan
2022	December 17, 2022	Northwestern (IA)	35–25	Keiser	Durham, North Carolina	Matt McCarty
2023	December 18, 2023	Keiser	31–21	Northwestern (IA)	Durham, North Carolina	Doug Socha
2024	December 21, 2024	Grand View	35–7	Keiser	Durham, North Carolina	Joe Woodley
2025	December 20, 2025	Grand View	22–16	Keiser	Fort Worth, Texas	E. J. Peterson

== Champions ==
- NAIA Division II titles are not included in this list.
National championships among active programs: 6, 3, 2, 1

=== Active NAIA programs ===
Team	Titles	Years
Carroll (MT)	6	2002, 2003, 2004, 2005, 2007, 2010
Grand View	3	2013, 2024, 2025
Morningside	3	2018, 2019, 2021
Saint Francis (IN)	2	2016, 2017
Marian (IN)	2	2012, 2015
Georgetown (KY)	2	2000, 2001
Saint Xavier	1	2011
Southern Oregon	1	2014
Lindsey Wilson	1	2020
Northwestern (IA)	1	2022
Keiser	1	2023

=== Former NAIA programs ===
Team	Titles	Years
Texas A&M–Kingsville	7	1959, 1969, 1970, 1974, 1975, 1976, 1979
Carson–Newman	5	1983, 1984, (Note: Shared title) 1986, 1988, 1989
Central Arkansas	3	1984, 1985, 1991
Central State (OH)	3	1990, 1992, 1995
Sioux Falls	3	2006, 2008, 2009
Pittsburg State	2	1957, 1961
Saint John's (MN)	2	1963, 1965
Abilene Christian	2	1973, 1977
Elon	2	1980, 1981
Central Oklahoma	2	1962, 1982
Northeastern State (OK)	2	1958, 1994
Montana State	1	1956
Saint Joseph's (IN)	1	1956
Lenoir–Rhyne	1	1960
Concordia Moorhead	1	1964
Sam Houston State	1	1964
Waynesburg	1	1966
Fairmont State	1	1967
Troy	1	1968
West Alabama	1	1971
East Texas A&M	1	1972
Angelo State	1	1978
Hillsdale	1	1985
Cameron	1	1987
East Central	1	1993
Southwestern Oklahoma State	1	1996
Findlay	1	1997
Azusa Pacific	1	1998
Northwestern Oklahoma State	1	1999

== List of appearances by team ==
=== Current NAIA members ===
==== Qualified teams ====
- Teams in bold are participating in the **2026 playoffs**.
- Updated before the 2026 playoffs.

Team	Appearances	First	Last	Wins	Losses	Ties	Total	Pct.
Arizona Christian Firestorm	2	2020	2022	0	2	0	2	.000
Avila Eagles	1	2022	2022	0	1	0	1	.000
**Baker Wildcats**	22	1980	2026	19	21	0	40	.475
**Benedictine Ravens**	18	1985	2026	12	17	0	29	.414
Bethany Swedes	10	1978	1999	3	10	0	13	.231
Bethel (KS) Threshers	3	1984	2020	0	3	0	3	.000
Bethel (TN) Wildcats	7	2006	2023	4	7	0	11	.364
**Campbellsville Tigers**	6	1997	2026	1	5	0	6	.167
Carroll Fighting Saints	25	1978	2025	43	19	0	62	.694
Central Methodist Eagles	1	2021	2021	0	1	0	1	.000
**College of Idaho Coyotes**	4	2019	2026	5	3	0	8	.625
Concordia (NE) Bulldogs	1	2002	2002	1	1	0	2	.500
Cumberland Bulldogs	1	1993	1993	0	1	0	1	.000
Cumberlands Patriots	9	1988	2019	6	9	0	15	.400
Dakota Wesleyan Tigers	1	1992	1992	0	1	0	1	.000
Dickinson State Blue Hawks	25	1981	2024	9	25	0	34	.265
Doane Tigers	6	1972	2016	3	6	0	9	.333
**Dordt Defenders**	4	2020	2026	1	3	0	4	.250
**Eastern Oregon Mountaineers** (Oregon College)	4	1975	2026	2	3	0	5	.400
Evangel Valor	6	1988	2025	7	9	0	16	.438
Faulkner Eagles	2	2013	2014	0	2	0	2	.000
**Friends Falcons**	7	1992	2026	2	6	0	8	.250
Georgetown Tigers	24	1987	2024	28	21	0	49	.571
Graceland Yellowjackets	1	2005	2005	0	1	0	1	.000
**Grand View Vikings**	15	2011	2026	23	11	0	34	.676
Hastings Broncos	8	1991	2009	3	8	0	11	.273
**Indiana Wesleyan Wildcats**	6	2021	2026	4	5	0	9	.444
Kansas Wesleyan Coyotes	7	2001	2024	4	6	0	10	.400
Keiser Seahawks	7	2019	2025	16	6	0	22	.727
Langston Lions	8	1973	2018	2	8	0	10	.200
**Lindsey Wilson Blue Raiders**	10	2014	2026	13	8	0	21	.619
**Louisiana Christian Wildcats**	2	2023	2026	0	1	0	1	.000
**Marian Knights**	14	2010	2026	21	11	0	32	.656
McPherson Bulldogs	2	2009	2010	0	2	0	2	.000
MidAmerica Nazarene Pioneers	12	2000	2024	6	12	0	18	.333
**Midland Warriors**	4	1979	2026	0	3	0	3	.000
Missouri Valley Vikings	13	1974	2016	11	13	0	24	.458
Montana State–Northern Lights	1	2006	2006	0	1	0	1	.000
**Montana Tech Orediggers**	13	1971	2026	6	12	0	18	.333
Montana Western Bulldogs	6	1994	2024	2	6	0	8	.250
**Morningside Mustangs**	23	2004	2026	36	19	0	55	.655
**Northwestern Red Raiders**	27	1972	2026	34	23	0	57	.596
Oklahoma Panhandle State Aggies (Panhandle State)	1	1981	1981	0	1	0	1	.000
Olivet Nazarene Tigers	3	1998	2020	3	3	0	6	.500
Ottawa (AZ) Spirit	3	2019	2024	0	3	0	3	.000
**Ottawa (KS) Braves**	11	1997	2026	1	10	0	11	.091
Peru State Bobcats	3	1989	1991	6	2	0	8	.750
Pikeville Bears	2	2005	2024	1	2	0	3	.333
Point Skyhawks	1	2015	2015	0	1	0	1	.000
**Reinhardt Eagles**	11	2015	2026	6	9	0	15	.400
Rocky Mountain Battlin' Bears	4	1998	2018	1	4	0	5	.200
St. Ambrose Fighting Bees	13	1984	2013	4	12	0	16	.250
St. Francis (IL) Fighting Saints	2	1987	2011	1	2	0	3	.333
Saint Francis (IN) Cougars	21	1999	2025	34	19	0	53	.642
**St. Thomas Bobcats**	4	2023	2026	1	3	0	4	.250
Saint Xavier Cougars	16	2002	2023	19	15	0	34	.559
Southeastern Fire	3	2016	2025	1	3	0	4	.250
Southern Oregon Raiders	7	1987	2017	13	6	0	19	.684
**Southwestern Moundbuilders**	9	1984	2026	3	7	0	10	.300
Sterling Warriors	3	2013	2017	0	3	0	3	.000
Tabor Bluejays	5	2003	2015	3	5	0	8	.375
Taylor Trojans	2	1998	1999	1	2	0	3	.333
Texas Wesleyan Rams	2	2024	2025	0	2	0	2	.000
Union Commonwealth Bulldogs	1	2008	2008	0	1	0	1	.000
Valley City State Vikings	9	1976	2014	1	9	0	10	.100
William Penn Statesmen	10	1975	2025	1	3	0	4	.250

==== Not yet qualified ====
- **Appalachian Athletic Conference** (3) – Bluefield, Kentucky Christian, Rio Grande
- **Frontier Conference** (3) – Dakota State, Mayville State, Simpson
- **Great Plains Athletic Conference** (3) – Briar Cliff, Mount Marty, Waldorf
- **Heart of America Athletic Conference** (5) – Clarke, Culver–Stockton, Missouri Baptist, Mount Mercy, William Woods
- **Kansas Collegiate Athletic Conference** (1) – Saint Mary
- **Mid-States Football Association** (5) – Defiance, Judson, Lawrence Tech, Madonna, Saint Mary-of-the-Woods
- **Sooner Athletic Conference** (4) – Arkansas Baptist, Nelson, Texas College, Wayland Baptist
- **Sun Conference** (5) – Ave Maria, Florida Memorial, Thomas, Warner, Webber International
- **Independent** (1) – Andrew

=== Former NAIA members ===
==== NCAA Division I FBS ====
Team	Appearances	First	Last	Wins	Losses	Ties	Total	Pct.
Sam Houston Bearkats (Sam Houston State)	1	1964	1964	1	0	1	2	.750
Troy Trojans (Troy State)	1	1968	1968	2	0	0	2	1.000

==== NCAA Division I FCS ====
Team	Appearances	First	Last	Wins	Losses	Ties	Total	Pct.
Abilene Christian Wildcats	2	1973	1977	4	0	0	4	1.000
Arkansas–Pine Bluff Golden Lions	2	1994	1995	2	2	0	4	.500
Central Arkansas Bears	13	1976	1992	12	10	2	24	.542
East Texas A&M Lions (East Texas State)	2	1972	1980	3	1	0	4	.750
Eastern Washington Eagles (Eastern Washington State)	2	1967	1967	1	1	0	2	.500
Elon Phoenix	6	1973	1981	9	4	0	13	.692
Gardner–Webb Runnin' Bulldogs	2	1987	1992	3	2	0	5	.600
Lindenwood Lions	6	1998	2010	5	6	0	11	.455
Montana State Bobcats	1	1956	1956	0	0	1	1	.500
Northern Arizona Lumberjacks (Arizona State–Flagstaff)	1	1958	1958	1	1	0	2	.500
Prairie View A&M Panthers	1	1963	1963	1	1	0	2	.500
Presbyterian Blue Hose	2	1979	1987	2	2	0	4	.500
St. Thomas (MN) Tommies	1	1983	1983	0	1	0	1	.000
Tarleton Texans	4	1978	1990	3	4	0	7	.429
Wofford Terriers	1	1970	1970	1	1	0	2	.500

==== NCAA Division II ====
Team (former names)	Appearances	First	Last	Wins	Losses	Ties	Total	Pct.
Adams State Grizzlies	2	1988	1989	4	2	0	6	.667
Angelo State Rams	3	1978	1980	4	2	0	6	.667
Arkansas Tech Wonder Boys	2	1971	1994	1	2	0	3	.333
Arkansas–Monticello Boll Weevils	2	1988	1993	2	2	0	4	.500
Black Hills State Yellow Jackets	2	2006	2007	0	2	0	2	.000
Carson–Newman Eagles	11	1972	1992	20	5	1	26	.788
Catawba Indians	1	1988	1988	0	1	0	1	.000
Central State Marauders	9	1987	1995	14	6	0	20	.700
Central Oklahoma Bronchos (Central State)	6	1962	1985	7	4	0	11	.636
Central Washington Wildcats	9	1984	1998	11	7	1	19	.605
Chadron State Eagles	2	1989	1990	0	2	0	2	.000
Colorado Mesa Mavericks (Mesa State)	7	1982	1990	9	7	0	16	.563
Concord Mountain Lions	8	1977	1992	0	8	0	8	.000
Concordia Golden Bears	2	1964	1969	2	1	1	4	.625
CSU Pueblo ThunderWolves (Southern Colorado)	1	1982	1982	0	1	0	1	.000
East Central Tigers	2	1983	1994	3	1	0	4	.750
Eastern New Mexico Greyhounds	1	1983	1983	0	1	0	1	.000
Edinboro Fighting Scots (Edinboro State)	1	1970	1970	0	1	0	1	.000
Emporia State Hornets	5	1962	1989	2	5	0	7	.286
Fairmont State Falcons	4	1965	1988	2	3	0	5	.400
Findlay Oilers	13	1964	1997	21	9	1	31	.694
Fort Hays State Tigers	1	1990	1990	0	1	0	1	.000
Glenville State Pioneers	3	1973	1994	3	3	0	6	.500
Grand Valley State Lakers	1	1978	1978	1	1	0	2	.500
Harding Bison	2	1989	1992	0	2	0	2	.000
Henderson State Reddies	2	1974	1985	2	2	0	4	.500
Hillsdale Chargers	8	1957	1988	6	7	1	14	.464
Jamestown Jimmies	5	1979	2007	1	5	0	6	.167
Lenoir–Rhyne Bears	3	1959	1962	4	2	0	6	.667
Mars Hill Lions	1	1980	1980	0	1	0	1	.000
Mary Marauders	10	1993	2004	7	10	0	17	.412
McKendree Bearcats	9	1997	2010	3	9	0	12	.250
Midwestern State Mustangs	1	1991	1991	1	1	0	2	.500
Minnesota–Crookston Golden Eagles	1	1997	1997	0	1	0	1	.000
Minnesota State–Moorhead Dragons (Moorhead State)	8	1981	1994	2	8	0	10	.200
Minot State Beavers	7	1970	2009	3	7	0	10	.300
Missouri Southern State Lions	1	1972	1972	2	0	0	2	1.000
Nebraska–Kearney Lopers (Kearney State)	4	1963	1980	1	4	0	5	.200
New Mexico Highlands Cowboys	3	1966	1969	0	3	0	3	.000
Northeastern State RiverHawks	9	1958	1995	9	7	0	16	.563
Northwestern Oklahoma State Rangers (Northwestern State)	12	1987	2010	12	10	0	22	.545
Northern Michigan Wildcats	2	1960	1967	0	2	0	2	.000
Northern State Wolves	5	1961	1988	0	5	0	5	.000
Ohio Dominican Panthers	1	2007	2007	1	1	0	2	.500
Ouachita Baptist Tigers	2	1975	1982	0	2	0	2	.000
Pittsburg State Gorillas	7	1957	1988	9	5	0	14	.643
Saginaw Valley State Cardinals	3	1979	1984	2	3	0	5	.400
Shepherd Rams	4	1983	1992	1	4	0	5	.250
Shorter Hawks	1	2008	2008	0	1	0	1	.000
Sioux Falls Cougars	16	1988	2010	36	12	0	48	.750
Southeastern Oklahoma State Savage Storm (Southeastern State)	1	1988	1988	1	1	0	2	.500
Southern Connecticut State Owls	1	1959	1959	0	1	0	1	.000
Southern Nazarene Crimson Storm	1	2011	2011	0	1	0	1	.000
Southwest Minnesota State Mustangs (Southwest State)	2	1987	1990	0	2	0	2	.000
Southwestern Oklahoma State Bulldogs (Southwestern State)	3	1977	1996	3	2	0	5	.600
Sul Ross Lobos	2	1965	1982	0	2	0	2	.000
Texas A&M–Kingsville Javelinas (Texas A&I)	8	1959	1979	16	1	0	17	.941
Tiffin Dragons	2	1993	1994	1	2	0	3	.333
UVA Wise Cavaliers (Clinch Valley)	2	1995	1996	0	2	0	2	.000
Walsh Cavaliers	1	2006	2006	0	1	0	1	.000
Washburn Ichabods	2	1986	1988	0	2	0	2	.000
West Alabama Tigers (Livingston)	2	1971	1972	2	1	0	3	.667
West Liberty Hilltoppers (West Liberty State)	2	1970	1971	0	2	0	2	.000
Western New Mexico Mustangs	2	1990	1993	0	2	0	2	.000
Western Oregon Wolves	2	1985	1997	0	2	0	2	.000
Western Colorado Mountaineers (Western State)	4	1976	1991	2	4	0	6	.333
William Jewell Cardinals	6	1973	1990	6	6	0	12	.500
Winona State Warriors	1	1993	1993	0	1	0	1	.000

==== NCAA Division III ====
Team	Appearances	First	Last	Wins	Losses	Ties	Total	Pct.
Anderson Ravens	2	1970	1981	1	2	0	3	.333
Austin Kangaroos	4	1979	1990	2	3	1	6	.417
Azusa Pacific Cougars	8	1998	2011	9	7	0	16	.563
Bluffton Beavers	2	1987	1988	1	2	0	3	.333
Cal Lutheran Kingsmen	5	1971	1982	4	4	0	8	.500
Carthage Firebirds	2	1971	1973	0	2	0	2	.000
Central Dutch	1	1966	1966	0	1	0	1	.000
Concordia–Moorhead Cobbers	2	1978	1981	5	0	1	6	.917
Concordia–Wisconsin Falcons	1	1990	1990	0	1	0	1	.000
Eureka Red Devils	2	1991	1994	0	2	0	2	.000
Franklin Grizzlies	1	1972	1972	0	1	0	1	.000
Geneva Golden Tornadoes	5	1987	2005	3	4	0	7	.429
Greenville Panthers	1	1990	1990	0	1	0	1	.000
Gustavus Adolphus Golden Gusties	1	1958	1958	0	1	0	1	.000
Hanover Panthers	6	1974	1989	1	6	0	7	.143
Hardin–Simmons Cowboys	5	1992	1996	5	5	0	10	.500
Howard Payne Yellow Jackets	2	1992	1995	0	2	0	2	.000
Lewis & Clark Pioneers	2	1989	1991	0	2	0	2	.000
Linfield Wildcats	15	1961	1994	16	12	0	28	.571
McMurry War Hawks	1	1980	1980	0	1	0	1	.000
Nebraska Wesleyan Prairie Wolves	4	1988	2000	2	3	0	5	.400
Pacific Lutheran Lutes	15	1979	1996	22	12	1	35	.643
Redlands Bulldogs	1	1976	1976	1	1	0	2	.500
Saint John's Johnnies	3	1963	1982	4	1	0	5	.800
Texas Lutheran Bulldogs	3	1974	1976	4	1	0	5	.800
Trine Thunder (Tri-State)	2	1998	2001	2	2	0	4	.500
Waynesburg Yellow Jackets	1	1966	1966	2	0	0	2	1.000
Westminster Titans	17	1970	1997	31	11	0	42	.738
Whittier Poets	1	1961	1961	0	1	0	1	.000
Whitworth Pirates	1	1960	1960	0	1	0	1	.000
Willamette Bearcats	3	1968	1997	4	3	0	7	.571
Wilmington Quakers	3	1980	1983	2	3	0	5	.400
Wisconsin–La Crosse Eagles (Wisconsin State–La Crosse)	7	1973	1990	10	6	0	16	.625
Wisconsin–Platteville Pioneers (Wisconsin State–Platteville)	1	1970	1970	0	1	0	1	.000
Wisconsin–River Falls Falcons (Wisconsin State–River Falls)	1	1979	1979	0	1	0	1	.000
Wisconsin–Stevens Point Pointers (Wisconsin State–Stevens Point)	3	1977	1989	0	-5	0	5	–
Wisconsin–Whitewater Warhawks (Wisconsin State–Whitewater)	1	1966	1966	1	1	0	2	.500

==== Discontinued programs ====
Team	Appearances	First	Last	Wins	Losses	Ties	Total	Pct.
Cameron Aggies	4	1974	1987	7	2	0	9	.778
Concordia (MI) Cardinals	5	2017	2021	3	5	0	8	.375
Dana Vikings	1	1987	1987	0	1	0	1	.000
Humboldt State Lumberjacks	1	1960	1960	1	1	0	2	.500
Huron Screaming Eagles	4	1986	2000	3	4	0	7	.429
Iowa Wesleyan Tigers	1	1991	1991	0	1	0	1	.000
Lambuth Eagles	8	1994	2009	7	8	0	15	.467
Malone Pioneers	2	1995	1998	1	2	0	3	.333
Oregon Tech Battling Owls	1	1988	1988	2	1	0	3	.667
Robert Morris Eagles	1	2016	2016	0	1	0	1	.000
Saint Joseph's Pumas	1	1956	1956	0	0	1	1	.500
St. Mary of the Plains Cavaliers	3	1989	1991	0	3	0	3	.000
Salem International Tigers (Salem)	3	1975	1985	1	3	0	4	.250
Trinity Trolls	1	1994	1994	0	1	0	1	.000
Trinity International Trojans	1	2004	2004	0	1	0	1	.000
West Virginia Tech Golden Bears	1	1989	1989	0	1	0	1	.000
Westmar Eagles	1	1987	1987	0	1	0	1	.000
Western Washington Vikings	4	1992	1996	4	4	0	8	.500

== See also ==
- NAIA Division II football national championship (contested from 1970 to 1996)
