= Barry Fagan =

American football coach and former player

Biographical details
- Born: c. 1955 (age 70–71)
- Education: Penn State (1978 BS); Wisconsin (1985 MS)

Playing career
- 1974–1977: Penn State

Coaching career (HC unless noted)
- 1988–1995: Ferris State (OC/QB/WR)
- 1996: West Bloomfield HS (MI)
- 1997–1999: Wayne State (MI)
- 2002–2009: Hillsdale (OC)
- 2011: Ave Maria

Head coaching record
- Overall: 5–37 (college)

Barry Fagan (born c. 1955) is an American former football player and coach. He was the head football coach at Wayne State University in Detroit, Michigan from 1997 to 1999. Fagan was the first head football coach at Ave Maria University in Ave Maria, Florida, serving one season in 2011.

== Head coaching record ==
=== College ===
Year	Team	Overall	Conference	Standing	Bowl/playoffs
Wayne State Tartars (Midwest Intercollegiate Football Conference) (1997–1998)
1997	Wayne State	3–8	3–7	T–7th	
1998	Wayne State	2–9	2–8	13th	
Wayne State Tartars (Great Lakes Intercollegiate Athletic Conference) (1999)
1999	Wayne State	0–11	0–10	13th	
Wayne State:		5–28	5–25		
Ave Maria Gyrenes (NAIA independent) (2011)
2011	Ave Maria	0–9			
Ave Maria:		0–9			
Total:		5–37			
