= 2024 NAIA football rankings =

Rankings for the 2024 NAIA football season

- Season: 2024
- Postseason: Single-elimination
- National champions: Grand View
- Runner up: Keiser

The 2024 National Association of Intercollegiate Athletics (NAIA) football rankings are conducted on a week-to-week basis, starting after week three.

== Legend ==
	Increase in ranking
	Decrease in ranking
	Not ranked previous week or no change
	Selected for NAIA playoffs
(#–#)	Win–loss record
(Italics)	Number of first place votes
т	Tied with team above or below also with this symbol

== NAIA Coaches' poll ==
	Preseason August 19	Week 1 September 9	Week 2 September 16	Week 3 September 23	Week 4 September 30	Week 5 October 7	Week 6 October 14	Week 7 October 21	Week 8 October 28	Week 9 November 4	Week 10 November 11	Week 11 (Final) November 17	Final January 6	
1.	Keiser (14)	Keiser (2–0) (14)	Keiser (2–0) (15)	Keiser (3–0) (16)	Keiser (3–0) (16)	Keiser (4–0) (16)	Keiser (4–0) (16)	Keiser (5–0) (16)	Keiser (6–0) (16)	Keiser (7–0) (16)	Keiser (8–0) (16)	Keiser (9–0) (15)	Grand View (14–0) (16)	1.
2.	Northwestern (IA) (2)	Northwestern (IA) (1–0) (2)	Northwestern (IA) (2–0) (2)	Northwestern (IA) (3–0) (1)	Northwestern (IA) (4–0) (1)	Grand View (5–0) (1)	Grand View (5–0) (1)	Grand View (6–0) (1)	Grand View (7–0) (1)	Grand View (8–0) (1)	Grand View (9–0) (1)	Grand View (10–0)	Keiser (12–1)	2.
3.	Georgetown (KY)	College of Idaho (2–0)	Grand View (2–0)	Grand View (3–0)	Grand View (4–0)	Indiana Wesleyan (5–1)	Indiana Wesleyan (6–1)	Indiana Wesleyan (7–1)	Indiana Wesleyam (7–1)	Indiana Wesleyan (8–1)	Indiana Wesleyan (9–1)	Indiana Wesleyan (10–1)	Morningside (12–2) т	3.
4.	College of Idaho	Grand View (1–0)	Montana Western (2–0)	Montana Western (3–0)	Indiana Wesleyan (4–1)	Bethel (TN) (5–0)	Dordt (5–0)	Dordt (6–0)	Montana Western (6–1)	Montana Western (7–1)	Montana Western (8–1)	Montana Western (9–1)	Benedictine (KS) (11–3) т	4.
5.	Grand View	Indiana Wesleyan (2–0)	Marian (IN) (2–0)	Bethel (TN) (3–0)	Bethel (TN) (4–0)	Dordt (4–0)	St. Thomas (FL) (4–1)	St. Thomas (FL) (5–1)	St. Thomas (FL) (6–1)	St. Thomas (FL) (7–1)	St. Thomas (FL) (8–1)	St. Thomas (FL) (9–1)	Montana Western (10–2)	5.
6.	Indiana Wesleyan	Marian (IN) (1–0)	Bethel (TN) (3–0)	Indiana Wesleyan (3–1)	St. Thomas (FL) (3–0)	St. Thomas (FL) (3–1)	Montana Western (4–1)	Montana Western (5–1)	Morningside (7–1)	Morningside (8–1)	Morningside (9–1)	Morningside (10–1)	Indiana Wesleyan (11–2)	6.
7.	Marian (IN)	Bethel (TN) (2–0)	Indiana Wesleyan (2–1)	Marian (IN) (3–0)	Southern Oregon (4–0)	Montana Western (3–1)	Morningside (5–1)	Benedictine (KS) (6–1)	Benedictine (KS) (7–1)	Dordt (7–1)	Texas Wesleyan (9–0)	Texas Wesleyan (10–0)	Northwestern (IA) (9–3)	7.
8.	Bethel (TN)	Saint Xavier (1–0)	St. Thomas (FL) (2–0)	St. Thomas (FL) (2–0)	Dordt (3–0)	Northwestern (IA) (4–1)	Benedictine (KS) (5–1)	Morningside (6–1)	Southern Oregon (7–1)	MidAmerica Nazarene (8–0)	Montana Tech (8–2)	Montana Tech (9–2)	Georgetown (KY) (9–3)	8.
9.	Saint Xavier	Montana Western (1–0)	College of Idaho (2–1)	Dordt (2–0)	Montana Western (3–1)	Morningside (4–1)	Northwestern (IA) (4–1)	Northwestern (IA) (5–1)	Northwestern (IA) (6–1)	Texas Wesleyan (8–0)	Benedictine (KS) (8–2)	Benedictine (KS) (9–2)	St. Thomas (FL) (9–2)	9.
10.	Morningside	St. Thomas (FL) (1–0)	Dordt (1–0)	Montana Tech (3–0)	Marian (IN) (4–0)	Marian (IN) (4–0)	Southern Oregon (5–1)	Southern Oregon (6–1)	Dordt (6–1)	Montana Tech (7–2)	Northwestern (IA) (7–2)	Northwestern (IA) (8–2)	Montana Tech (9–3)	10.
11.	Montana Western	Georgetown (KY) (1–1)	Saint Xavier (1–1)	Saint Xavier (2–1)	Morningside (4–1)	Benedictine (KS) (5–1)	Bethel (TN) (5–1)	Texas Wesleyan (6–0)	Texas Wesleyan (7–0)	Benedictine (KS) (7–2)	Georgetown (KY) (7–2)	Georgetown (KY) (8–2)	Texas Wesleyan (10–1)	11.
12.	St. Thomas (FL)	Benedictine (KS) (2–0)	Montana Tech (2–0)	Morningside (3–1)	Benedictine (KS) (4–1)	Montana Tech (4–1)	College of Idaho (5–2) т	College of Idaho (6–2)	MidAmerica Nazarene (7–0)	Georgetown (KY) (6–2)	Baker (8–1)	Baker (9–1)	Friends (11–2)	12.
13.	Dordt	Dordt (1–0)	Morningside (2–1)	Benedictine (KS) (3–1)	Saint Xavier (3–1)	Southern Oregon (4–1)	Texas Wesleyan (5–0)	MidAmerica Nazarene (6–0)	Montana Tech (6–2) т	Northwestern (IA) (6–2)	MidAmerica Nazarene (8–1)	MidAmerica Nazarene (9–1)	Southwestern (KS) (11–2)	13.
14.	Evangel	Morningside (1–1)	Benedictine (KS) (2–1)	Southern Oregon (3–0)	Texas Wesleyan (4–0) т	Texas Wesleyan (4–0)	MidAmerica Nazarene (5–0)	Georgetown (KY) (4–2)	Georgetown (KY) (5–2) т	Carroll (MT) (7–1)	Southern Oregon (8–2)	Dickinson State (9–1)	Dickinson State (10–2)	14.
15.	Dickinson State	Montana Tech (2–0)	Georgetown (KY) (1–2)	Georgetown (KY) (1–2)	College of Idaho (3–2) т	College of Idaho (4–2)	Montana Tech (4–2)	Montana Tech (5–2)	Baker (6–1)	Baker (7–1)	Dickinson State (8–1)	OUAZ (8–1)	MidAmerica Nazarene (9–2)	15.
16.	OUAZ	Evangel (2–0)	Evangel (3–0)	Baker (3–0)	Montana Tech (3–1)	MidAmerica Nazarene (5–0)	Georgetown (KY) (3–2)	Bethel (TN) (5–1)	Evangel (7–0)	Southern Oregon (7–2)	Dordt (7–2)	Southeastern (7–2)	OUAZ (8–2)	16.
17.	Baker	Dicksinson State (2–0)	Baker (2–0)	Evangel (3–0)	MidAmerica Nazarene (4–0)	Georgetown (KY) (2–2)	Marian (IN) (4–1)	Baker (5–1)	Dickinson State (6–1)	Dickinson State (7–1)	OUAZ (7–1)	Concordia (NE) (8–2)	Baker (9–2)	17.
18.	Reinhardt	Baker (1–0)	Texas Wesleyan (3–0)	Texas Wesleyan (4–0)	Georgetown (KY) (2–2)	Evangel (5–0)	Saint Xavier (4–2)	Marian (IN) (5–1)	Southeastern (5–1)	OUAZ (7–1)	Saint Francis (IN) (8–2)	Dordt (8–2)	Concordia (NE) (8–2) т	18.
19.	Benedictine (KS)	Texas Wesleyan (2–0)	MidAmerica Nazarene (2–0)	College of Idaho (2–2)	Evangel (4–0)	Baker (4–1)	Baker (4–1)	Friends (7–0)	St. Francis (IL) (6–1)	Southeastern (5–2)	Southeastern (6–2)	Friends (10–1)т	Southeastern (7–2) т	19.
20.	Lindsey Wilson	MidAmerica Nazarene (1–0)	Southern Oregon (2–0)	MidAmerica Nazarene (3–0)	Baker (3–1)	Saint Xavier (3–2)	Evangel (5–0)	Evangel (6–0)	OUAZ (6–1)	Friends (8–1)	Concordia (NE) (7–2)	Southwestern (KS) (10–1)т	Dordt (8–2)	20.
21.	Montana Tech	Freinds (2–0)	Friends (3–0)	Friends (4–0)	Dickinson State (3–1)	Dickinson State (4–1)	Southwestern (KS) (6–0)	Dickinson State (6–1)	Carroll (MT) (6–1)	Evangel (7–1)	Southwestern (KS) (9–1)	Campbellsville (9–2)	Campbellsville (9–2)	21.
22.	Louisiana Christian	Reinhardt (1–1)	Dickinson State (2–1)	Dickinson State (2–1)	Freinds (5–0) т	Southwestern (KS) (6–0)	Dickinson State (5–1)	Southeastern (4–1)	Cumberland (TN) (6–2)	Saint Francis (IN) (6–2)	Friends (9–1)	Taylor (IN) (9–2) т	Pikeville (6–6)	22.
23.	MidAmerica Nazarene	Southern Oregon (1–0)	Lindsey Wilson (2–1)	St. Francis (IL) (3–0) т	Southwestern (KS) (5–0) т	Friends (6–0)	Friends (6–0)	St. Francis (IL) (5–1)	Friends (7–1)	Concordia (NE) (7–2)	Carroll (MT) (7–2)	Southern Oregon (8–3) т	Saint Francis (IN) (8–4)	23.
24.	Friends	OUAZ (0–1)	Southwestern (KS) (3–0)	Lindsey Wilson (2–1) т	Lindsey Wilson (2–1)	Lindsey Wilson (3–1)	OUAZ (4–1)	OUAZ (5–1)	College of Idaho (6–3)	Campbellsville (8–1)	St. Francis (IL) (7–2)	Marian (IN) (8–2)	Southern Oregon (8–3)	24.
25.	Kansas Wesleyan	Lindsey Wilson (1–1)	St. Francis (IL) (2–0)	Southwestern (KS) (4–0)	OUAZ (2–1)	OUAZ (3–1)	Campbellsville (6–0)	Cumberland (TN) (5–2)	Bethel (TN) (5–2)	Southwestern (KS) (8–1)	Campbellsville (8–2)	Saint Francis (IN) (8–3)	Taylor (IN) (9–2)	25.
	Preseason August 19	Week 1 September 9	Week 2 September 16	Week 3 September 23	Week 4 September 30	Week 5 October 7	Week 6 October 14	Week 7 October 21	Week 8 October 28	Week 9 November 4	Week 10 November 11	Week 11 (Final) November 17	Final January 6	
		Dropped: Louisiana Christian (0–1); Kansas Wesleyan (1–1)	Dropped: Reinhardt (1–2); OUAZ (0–1)	None	Dropped: St. Francis (IL) (3–1)	None	Dropped: Lindsey Wilson (3–2)	Dropped: Saint Xavier (4–3); Southwestern (KS) (6–1); Campbellsville (6–1)	Dropped: Marian (IN) (5–2)	Dropped: St. Francis (IL) (7–3); Cumberland (TN) (7–2); College of Idaho (6–4); Bethel (TN) (5–3)	Dropped: Evangel (7–2)	Dropped: Carroll (MT) (7–3); St. Francis (IL) (7–3)	Dropped: Marian (IN) (8–2)	
