= Jason Burianek =

American football coach (born c. 1979)

Current position
- Title: Head coach
- Team: Belleville HS-East
- Record: 5-5

Biographical details
- Born: c. 1979 (age 46–47); Boulder, Colorado, U.S.
- Education: University of Colorado Boulder (2003)

Playing career
- 1998–2002: Colorado
- Position: Wide receiver

Coaching career (HC unless noted)
- 2003: Colorado (GA)
- 2004–2006: McKendree (WR/TE)
- 2007–2008: Belleville West HS (IL) (OC)
- 2009–2010: McKendree (QB)
- 2011: Belleville West HS (IL) (OC)
- 2012: McKendree (ST/WR)
- 2013–2025: Missouri Baptist
- 2026–present: Belleville HS-East

Head coaching record
- Overall: College 34–90 High School 5-5

Jason Burianek (born c. 1979) is an American college football coach. He was the head football coach for Missouri Baptist University from 2013 to 2025. He also coached for Colorado, McKendree, and Belleville High School-West. He played college football for Colorado as a wide receiver.

== Head coaching record ==
Year	Team	Overall	Conference	Standing	Bowl/playoffs
Missouri Baptist Spartans (NAIA independent) (2014)
2014	Missouri Baptist	1–10			
Missouri Baptist Spartans (Mid-States Football Association) (2015–2022)
2015	Missouri Baptist	0–10	0–6	7th (MEL)	
2016	Missouri Baptist	3–8	2–4	T–4th (MEL)	
2017	Missouri Baptist	3–8	1–5	6th (MEL)	
2018	Missouri Baptist	4–7	2–4	5th (MEL)	
2019	Missouri Baptist	2–9	1–5	6th (MWL)	
2020–21	Missouri Baptist	1–6	1–6	6th (MWL)	
2021	Missouri Baptist	4–7	1–6	T–7th (MWL)	
2022	Missouri Baptist	4–7	2–5	T–5th (MWL)	
Missouri Baptist Spartans (Heart of America Athletic Conference) (2023–2025)
2023	Missouri Baptist	2–8	1–4	5th (South)	
2024	Missouri Baptist	6–4	3–3	4th (South)	
2025	Missouri Baptist	4–6	3–3	4th (South)	
Missouri Baptist:		34–90	17–51		
Total:		34–90			
