= Myles Russ =

American football coach (born 1989)

Current position
- Title: Head coach
- Team: Keiser
- Conference: TSC
- Record: 24–2

Biographical details
- Born: April 19, 1989 (age 37); Boca Raton, Florida, U.S.
- Education: Robert Morris University (2011, 2014)

Playing career
- 2007–2010: Robert Morris
- Position: Running back

Coaching career (HC unless noted)
- 2012–2015: Robert Morris (RB)
- 2017–2018: Keiser (RB)
- 2019–2023: Keiser (AHC/RB)
- 2024–present: Keiser

Head coaching record
- Overall: 24–2
- Tournaments: 5–2 (NAIA playoffs)

Accomplishments and honors

Championships
- 2 TSC (2024, 2025)

Awards
- NEC Offensive Player of the Year (2010); All-NEC (2010)

Myles Russ (born April 15, 1989) is an American college football coach. He is the head football coach for Keiser University, a position he has held since 2024. He also coached for Robert Morris. He played college football for Robert Morris as a running back.

== Head coaching record ==
| Year | Team | Overall | Conference | Standing | Bowl/playoffs | NAIA^{#} |
|---|---|---|---|---|---|---|
Keiser Seahawks (Sun Conference) (2024–present)
| 2024 | Keiser | 12–1 | 6–0 | 1st | L NAIA Championship | 2 |
| 2025 | Keiser | 12–1 | 7–0 | 1st | L NAIA Championship | 2 |
| 2026 | Keiser | 0–0 | 0–0 | | | |
| Keiser: | | 24–2 | 13–0 | | | |
| Total: | | 24–2 | | | | |
National championship Conference title Conference division title or championship game berth
