= 2024 NAIA football season =

American college football season

- Total No. of teams: 97
- Regular season: August 24 – November 16, 2024
- Postseason: November 23 – December 21, 2024
- National Championship: Durham County Memorial Stadium; Durham, NC; December 21, 2024
- Champion: Grand View
- Player of the Year: Jackson Waring, QB, Grand View

The 2024 NAIA football season was the component of the 2024 college football season organized by the National Association of Intercollegiate Athletics (NAIA) in the United States.

The regular season began on August 24 and ended on November 16.

The playoffs, known as the NAIA Football National Championship, began on November 23. They ended with the championship game on December 21 at Durham County Memorial Stadium in Durham, North Carolina, where No. 2 Grand View defeated No. 1 Keiser to win the national championship.

== Membership changes ==
Team	Former conference	New conference	Ref
Defiance Yellow Jackets	HCAC (NCAA D-III)	Mid-States	
Jamestown Jimmies	Great Plains	North Star	
Roosevelt Lakers	Mid-States	GLIAC (NCAA D-II)	
Simpson Red Hawks	New program	Independent	
St. Ambrose Fighting Bees	Mid-States	Heart of America	
Waldorf Warriors	North Star	Great Plains	
William Woods Owls	New program	Heart of America	

== Headlines ==
- March 1 – Southwestern Assemblies of God University (SAGU) announced that they would change their name to Nelson University, effective on August 1.

== Milestones and records ==
- November 16 – Pikeville quarterback Lee Kirkland threw for 646 yards and 11 touchdowns in the Bears' 90–14 win over St. Andrews, setting a new NAIA single-game record for yardage and tying the overall college football record for single-game TD passes held by David Klingler of Houston since 1991.

== Conference standings ==
2024 Appalachian Athletic Conference football standings
	Conf.			Overall
Team	W		L	W		L
Reinhardt +	5	–	1	7	–	4
No. 22 Pikeville +^	5	–	1	6	–	6
Bluefield	4	–	2	5	–	6
Point	4	–	2	4	–	7
Union Commonwealth	2	–	4	3	–	7
Kentucky Christian	1	–	5	2	–	9
St. Andrews	0	–	6	0	–	9
+ – Conference co-champions; ^ – NAIA playoff participant; Rankings from NAIA Coaches' Poll

2024 Frontier Conference football standings
	Conf.			Overall
Team	W		L	W		L
No. 5 Montana Western $^	7	–	1	10	–	2
No. 10 Montana Tech ^	6	–	2	9	–	3
Carroll (MT)	6	–	2	7	–	3
No. 24 Southern Oregon	5	–	3	8	–	3
College of Idaho	5	–	3	7	–	4
Eastern Oregon	4	–	4	5	–	6
Arizona Christian	1	–	7	2	–	8
Rocky Mountain	1	–	7	2	–	8
Montana State–Northern	1	–	7	1	–	9
$ – Conference champion; ^ – NAIA playoff participant; Rankings from NAIA Coaches' Poll

2024 Great Plains Athletic Conference football standings
	Conf.			Overall
Team	W		L	W		L
No. 3т Morningside $^	10	–	0	12	–	2
No. 7 Northwestern (IA) ^	8	–	2	9	–	3
No. 18т Concordia (NE)	8	–	2	8	–	2
No. 20 Dordt	8	–	2	8	–	2
Midland	5	–	5	6	–	5
Mount Marty	5	–	5	6	–	5
Dakota Wesleyan	4	–	6	4	–	7
Doane	3	–	7	3	–	8
Briar Cliff	2	–	8	2	–	9
Hastings	2	–	8	2	–	9
Waldorf	0	–	10	0	–	11
$ – Conference champion; ^ – NAIA playoff participant; Rankings from NAIA Coaches' Poll

2024 Heart of America Athletic Conference football standings
	Conf.			Overall
Team	W		L	W		L
North
No. 1 Grand View x^	6	–	0	14	–	0
Graceland	5	–	1	7	–	4
Peru State	5	–	2	7	–	3
Culver–Stockton	3	–	3	3	–	8
William Penn	2	–	4	4	–	6
St. Ambrose	1	–	5	3	–	8
Clarke	0	–	6	1	–	10
South
No. 3т Benedictine (KS) x^	5	–	1	11	–	3
No. 17 Baker x^	5	–	1	9	–	2
No. 15 MidAmerica Nazarene x^	5	–	1	9	–	2
Missouri Baptist	3	–	3	6	–	4
Missouri Valley	2	–	4	4	–	6
Central Methodist	1	–	5	1	–	10
William Woods	0	–	7	1	–	10
x – Division champion/co-champions; ^ – NAIA playoff participant; Rankings from NAIA Coaches' Poll

2024 Kansas Collegiate Athletic Conference football standings
	Conf.			Overall
Team	W		L	W		L
Bissell Division
Kansas Wesleyan x^	5	–	0	7	–	4
Tabor	4	–	1	6	–	5
Avila	3	–	2	4	–	7
Sterling	2	–	3	2	–	9
Ottawa	1	–	4	1	–	10
Saint Mary (KS)	0	–	5	1	–	9
Kessinger Division
No. 12 Friends x^	4	–	1	11	–	2
No. 13 Southwestern (KS) x^	4	–	1	11	–	2
McPherson	3	–	2	8	–	3
Evangel	3	–	2	8	–	2
Bethel (KS)	1	–	4	5	–	6
Bethany (KS)	0	–	5	3	–	8
x – Division champion/co-champions; ^ – NAIA playoff participant; Rankings from NAIA Coaches' Poll

2024 Mid-South Conference football standings
	Conf.			Overall
Team	W		L	W		L
No. 8 Georgetown (KY) $^	6	–	0	9	–	2
No. 21 Campbellsville	4	–	2	9	–	2
Bethel (TN)	3	–	3	7	–	3
Cumberland (TN)	3	–	3	7	–	3
Lindsey Wilson	3	–	3	5	–	4
Cumberlands (KY)	2	–	4	5	–	5
Faulkner	0	–	6	2	–	8
$ – Conference champion; ^ – NAIA playoff participant; Rankings from NAIA Coaches' Poll

2024 Mid-States Football Association standings
	Conf.			Overall
Team	W		L	W		L
Mideast League
No. 6 Indiana Wesleyan x^	5	–	0	11	–	2
No. 25 Taylor	4	–	1	9	–	2
Concordia (MI)	3	–	2	5	–	6
Siena Heights	2	–	3	3	–	7
Lawrence Tech	1	–	4	2	–	8
Madonna	0	–	5	0	–	11
Defiance	0	–	0	4	–	7
Midwest League
Marian (IN) x	4	–	1	8	–	2
No. 23 Saint Francis (IN) x^	4	–	1	8	–	4
St. Francis (IL)	3	–	2	7	–	3
Olivet Nazarene	3	–	2	6	–	4
Saint Xavier	1	–	4	5	–	6
Judson	0	–	5	1	–	9
x – League champion/co-champions ^ – NAIA playoff participant; Rankings from NAIA Coaches' Poll

2024 North Star Athletic Association football standings
	Conf.			Overall
Team	W		L	W		L
No. 14 Dickinson State $^	8	–	0	10	–	1
Dakota State	4	–	4	6	–	4
Mayville State	3	–	5	4	–	6
Jamestown	3	–	5	3	–	7
Valley City State	2	–	6	3	–	7
$ – Conference champion; ^ – NAIA playoff participant; Rankings from NAIA Coaches' Poll

2024 Sooner Athletic Conference football standings
	Conf.			Overall
Team	W		L	W		L
No. 11 Texas Wesleyan $^	8	–	0	10	–	1
No. 16 OUAZ ^	7	–	1	8	–	2
Texas College	5	–	3	7	–	3
Langston	5	–	3	6	–	4
OK Panhandle State*	4	–	4	5	–	5
Wayland Baptist	3	–	5	4	–	6
Louisiana Christian	3	–	5	4	–	7
North American	1	–	6	2	–	9
Nelson*	1	–	7	3	–	7
Arkansas Baptist	0	–	8	1	–	10
+ – Conference co-champions; ^ – NAIA playoff participant * – Nelson forfeit against Oklahoma Panhandle State after the season; Rankings from NAIA Coaches' Poll

2024 Sun Conference football standings
	Conf.					Overall
Team	W		L		T	W		L		T
No. 2 Keiser $^	6	–	0	–	0	12	–	1	–	0
No. 9 St. Thomas (FL) ^	6	–	1	–	0	9	–	2	–	0
No. 18т Southeastern	5	–	2	–	0	8	–	2	–	0
Florida Memorial	4	–	3	–	0	6	–	4	–	1
Webber International	2	–	4	–	0	4	–	5	–	0
Ave Maria	2	–	4	–	0	3	–	7	–	0
Thomas	1	–	5	–	0	1	–	8	–	0
Warner	0	–	6	–	0	0	–	8	–	0
$ – Conference champion; ^ – NAIA playoff participant Florida Memorial's game against Clark Atlanta was delayed at halftime due to weather, but was never rescheduled and resulted in a tie; Rankings from NAIA Coaches' Poll

2024 NAIA independents football records
	Conf.			Overall
Team	W		L	W		L
Simpson (CA)		–		0	–	9
Rankings from NAIA Coaches' Poll

== Postseason ==
=== Teams ===
==== Automatic bids (13) ====
Automatic bids
Conference		School	Record	Appearance	Last
Appalachian		Pikeville	5–5	2nd	2005
Frontier		Montana Western	9–1	6th	2023
Great Plains		Morningside	10–1	21st	2023
Heart of America	North Division	Grand View	10–0	13th	2023
Heart of America	South Division	Benedictine (KS)	9–2	16th	2022
KCAC	Bissell Division	Kansas Wesleyan	7–4	7th	2021
KCAC	Kessinger Division	Friends	10–1	5th	2008
Mid-South		Georgetown (KY)	8–2	24th	2023
Mid-States	Mideast League	Indiana Wesleyan	10–1	4th	2023
Mid-States	Midwest League	Saint Francis (IN)	8–3	20th	2019
North Star		Dickinson State	9–1	25th	2023
Sooner		Texas Wesleyan	10–0	1st	—
Sun		Keiser	9–0	6th	2023

==== At-large bids (7) ====
At-large bids
School	Conference	Record	Appearance	Last
Baker	Heart of America	9–1	21st	2023
MidAmerica Nazarene	Heart of America	9–1	12th	2014
Montana Tech	Frontier	9–2	11th	2023
Northwestern (IA)	Great Plains	8–2	26th	2023
OUAZ	Sooner	8–1	3rd	2021
Southwestern (KS)	KCAC	10–1	8th	2022
St. Thomas (FL)	Sun	9–1	2nd	2023

=== Bracket ===
First Round; November 23; Campus sites
13	Baker	35
20	Pikeville	42
15	Southwestern (KS)	31
18	Saint Francis (IN)	24
14	Dickinson State	27
19	Kansas Wesleyan	20
16	Friends	47
17	OUAZ	35

Second Round; November 30; Campus sites
5	St. Thomas (FL)	21
10	Georgetown (KY)	27
1	Keiser	56
20	Pikeville	21
8	Texas Wesleyan	33
9	Benedictine (KS)	42
3	Indiana Wesleyan	24
15	Southwestern (KS)	13
6	Morningside	35
12	MidAmerica Nazarene	0
4	Montana Western	41
14	Dickinson State	14
7	Montana Tech	29
11	Northwestern (IA)	32
2	Grand View	21
16	Friends	17

Quarterfinals; December 7 Campus sites
10	Georgetown (KY)	22
1	Keiser	38
9	Benedictine (KS)	20
3	Indiana Wesleyan	9
6	Morningside	31
4	Montana Western	24
11	Northwestern (IA)	0
2	Grand View	17

Semifinals; December 14; Campus sites
1	Keiser	42
9	Benedictine (KS)	38
6	Morningside	13
2	Grand View	36

Championship; December 21; Durham County Memorial Stadium; Durham, North Carolina
1	Keiser	7
2	Grand View	35

== Coaching changes ==
=== Preseason and in-season ===
This is restricted to coaching changes that took place on or after May 1, 2024, and will include any changes announced after a team's last regularly scheduled games but before its playoff games.

School	Outgoing coach	Date	Reason	Replacement	Previous position
Sterling	Darren Jackson	June 4, 2024	Fired	Reggie Langford Jr.	Sterling assistant head coach and offensive coordinator (2023)
Bethel (KS)	A. B. Stokes	July 8, 2024	Resigned	Daylon Markham (full-season interim)	Bethel (KS) defensive coordinator (2023)
Kansas Wesleyan	Matt Myers	October 9, 2024	Fired	Chris Snyder / David Leonard (co-interim head coaches)	Kansas Wesleyan recruiting coordinator (2023–2024) / Kansas Wesleyan defensive coordinator (2021–2024)
Rio Grande (Note: The Rio Grande football program was established in 2023 and will not begin official NAIA play until the 2025 season.)	Quincy Wilson	November 13, 2024	Fired	Mark Thurston	Rio Grande defensive coordinator (2024)

=== End of season ===
This list includes coaching changes announced during the season that did not take effect until the end of the season.

School	Outgoing coach	Date	Reason	Replacement	Previous position
Kansas Wesleyan	Chris Snyder / David Leonard	November 25, 2024	Permanent replacement hired	Matt Middleton	Harding quarterbacks coach and fullbacks coach (2023–2024)
St. Andrews	Bob Curtin	December 2, 2024	Resigned	Matt Quinn	Chesterfield HS (SC) head coach (2024)
Saint Francis (IN)	Kevin Donley	December 2, 2024	Retired	Adam Sherman	Saint Francis (IN) offensive coordinator (2024)
Bethel (KS)	Daylon Markham (full-season interim)	December 3, 2024	Resigned	Josh Lawson	Calvin defensive coordinator (2023–2024)
Georgetown (KY)	Chris Oliver	December 10, 2024	Resigned	John Perin	Georgetown (KY) defensive coordinator (2022–2024)
Faulkner	Rob Gray	December 11, 2024	Resigned	Dayne Brown	Enterprise HS (AL) defensive coordinator (2024)
Mount Mercy	—N/a	December 11, 2024	—N/a (Note: The Mount Mercy football program was announced in 2024 and will not begin official NAIA play until the 2026 season.)	MD Daniels	Bethel (TN) co-offensive coordinator and wide receivers coach (2024)
Bethel (TN)	Michael Jasper	December 20, 2024	Hired as head coach by Stetson	Chris Springer	Bethel (TN) associate head coach and defensive coordinator (2017–2024)
William Woods	Julian Mendez	December 23, 2024	Hired as assistant coach by Washburn	Sam Camp	William Woods offensive coordinator (2024)
Grand View	Joe Woodley	December 23, 2024	Hired as head coach by Drake	E. J. Peterson	Grand View defensive coordinator (2018–2024)
Missouri Valley	Casey Creehan	January 2, 2025	Hired as defensive line coach by Hamilton Tiger-Cats	LaQuentin Black	Northern Iowa safeties coach (2024)
Florida Memorial	Bobby Rome II	January 19, 2025	Fired	Michael Jones	Florida Memorial offensive coordinator (2021–2024)
Union Commonwealth	John Luttrell	January 28, 2025	Resigned	Boston Bryant	Union Commonwealth defensive coordinator (2023–2024)
Lawrence Tech	Scott Merchant	February 17, 2025	Hired as head coach by Bloomfield Hills HS (MI)	Oscar Olejniczak	Lawrence Tech offensive coordinator and offensive line coach (2024)
MidAmerica Nazarene	Paul Hansen	February 26, 2025	Hired as head coach by Southwest Baptist	Ivan Cordova	MidAmerica Nazarene defensive coordinator and defensive line coach (2021–2024)
OUAZ	Mike Nesbitt	March 10, 2025	Hired as offensive coordinator and quarterbacks coach by Houston Christian	Reilly Murphy	St. Thomas (FL) co-offensive coordinator and tight ends coach (2024)
Point	Trevor Zeiders	before March 30, 2025	Fired	Nigel Lawrence	Russell County HS (AL) co-defensive coordinator & cornerbacks coach (2024)

== See also ==
- 2024 NCAA Division I FBS football season
- 2024 NCAA Division I FCS football season
- 2024 NCAA Division II football season
- 2024 NCAA Division III football season
- 2024 U Sports football season
- 2024 NAIA flag football season
