= 2024 Grand View Vikings football team =

American college football season

2024 Grand View Vikings football

NAIA national champion HAAC North champion

NAIA Championship Game, W 35–7 vs. Keiser
- Conference: Heart of America Athletic Conference
- North
- Record: 14–0 (6–0 HAAC)
- Head coach: Joe Woodley (6th season)
- Offensive coordinator: Derek Fulton (5th season)
- Defensive coordinator: E.J. Peterson (6th season)
- Home stadium: Duke Williams Stadium; Mediacom Stadium; Valley Stadium

2024 Heart of America Athletic Conference football standings
	Conf.			Overall
Team	W		L	W		L
North
No. 1 Grand View x^	6	–	0	14	–	0
Graceland	5	–	1	7	–	4
Peru State	5	–	2	7	–	3
Culver–Stockton	3	–	3	3	–	8
William Penn	2	–	4	4	–	6
St. Ambrose	1	–	5	3	–	8
Clarke	0	–	6	1	–	10
South
No. 3т Benedictine (KS) x^	5	–	1	11	–	3
No. 17 Baker x^	5	–	1	9	–	2
No. 15 MidAmerica Nazarene x^	5	–	1	9	–	2
Missouri Baptist	3	–	3	6	–	4
Missouri Valley	2	–	4	4	–	6
Central Methodist	1	–	5	1	–	10
William Woods	0	–	7	1	–	10
x – Division champion/co-champions; ^ – NAIA playoff participant; Rankings from NAIA Coaches' Poll

The 2024 Grand View Vikings football team was an American football team that represented Grand View University as a member of the North Division of the Heart of America Athletic Conference (HAAC) during the 2024 NAIA football season. In their sixth season under head coach Joe Woodley, the Vikings have compiled a 14–0 record (6–0 against HAAC opponents) and won the HAAC and NAIA national championships. In the NAIA playoffs, they defeated Friends, Northwestern (IA), and Morningside in the first three rounds. They defeated Keiser in the NAIA championship game to win their second national championship.

Key players included quarterback Jackson Waring (2,514 passing yards), Dalten Van Pelt (816 rushing yards), receiver Aisea Toki (731 receiving yards), and linebacker John Argo (72 tackles).

The team played its home games at Duke Williams Stadium and Mediacom Stadium in Des Moines, Iowa.

== Schedule ==
Date	Opponent	Rank	Site	Result	Attendance	Source
September 7	William Woods*	No. 5	Valley Stadium; West Des Moines, IA	W 54–6		
September 14	at Benedictine (KS)*	No. 4	Wilcox Stadium; Atchison, KS	W 52–28		
September 21	Missouri Valley*	No. 3	Duke Williams Stadium; Des Moines, IA	W 24–0		
September 28	at Culver–Stockton	No. 3	Poulton Stadium; Canton, MO	W 45–13		
October 5	Clarke	No. 3	Duke Williams Stadium; Des Moines, IA	W 89–0		
October 17	at Central Methodist*	No. 2	Outdoor Athletic Facility; Fayette, MO	W 42–7		
October 26	at St. Ambrose	No. 2	Bush Stadium; Davenport, IA	W 34–0		
November 2	William Penn	No. 2	Duke Williams Stadium; Des Moines, IA	W 42–6		
November 9	at Peru State	No. 2	Oak Bowl; Peru, NE	W 26–7		
November 16	Graceland	No. 2	Duke Williams Stadium; Des Moines, IA	W 31–13		
November 30	No. 16 Friends*	No. 2	Mediacom Stadium; Des Moines, IA (NAIA second round)	W 21–17		
December 7	No. 11 Northwestern (IA)*	No. 2	Mediacom Stadium; Des Moines, IA (NAIA quarterfinal)	W 17–0		
December 14	No. 6 Morningside*	No. 2	Mediacom Stadium; Des Moines, IA (NAIA semifinal)	W 36–13		
December 21	vs. No. 1 Keiser*	No. 2	Durham County Memorial Stadium; Durham, NC (NAIA championship)	W 35–7		
*Non-conference game; Rankings from NAIA Coaches' Poll released prior to the game

== Roster ==
2024 Grand View Vikings football team roster
Players
Coaches
Offense

Pos.	#	Name	Class
WR	0	Jordan Kumm	Jr
WR	1	Zane Johnson	Sr
WR	2	Wyatt Williams	So
RB	3	Dalten Van Pelt	Jr
WR	4	Rex Woodley	So
WR	5	Gabe Winterrowd	So
WR	7	Peyton Goode	Jr
QB	8	Jackson Waring	Sr
WR	9	Louis Brooks	Jr
WR	10	Tiegan Bothun	Jr
WR	11	Aisea Toki	Sr
RB	12	Tate Stine-Smith	Sr
QB	16	Peyton Rottinghaus	So
QB	17	Sawyer Wardlow	Jr
WR	18	Triston Williams	So
WR	19	Jonah Miyazawa	GS
WR	21	TJ Jackson	So
RB	22	Cale Culver	Jr
RB	24	Tim Nimely	Sr
RB	25	Titus Christiansen	Jr
RB	26	Kenson Fuller	So
WR	30	Eli Gaye	Sr
TE	34	Nate Willcockson	GS
TE	44	Lance Clayburg	So
OL	50	Sam Joyce	So
OL	53	Nikolas Peters	So
OL	56	Ryan Saddler	Jr
OL	58	Nate Timmons	Jr
OL	59	Michael Steinfeldt	So
OL	60	Joseph Sifuentes	So
OL	61	Julian Perez-Hall	So
OL	62	Andrew Nickell	So
OL	63	Boston Huck	So
OL	65	Jaylen Green	So
OL	66	Jackson Mueller	Jr
OL	68	Matthew Kauffman	Sr
OL	72	Ethan Alvarado	Jr
OL	74	Noah Clark	GS
OL	75	Jamil Musignac	So
OL	76	Payton McNealy	Jr
OL	77	Brody Fuller	So
OL	78	James Wartick	Sr
OL	79	Christian Stoler	Jr
WR	80	Lamarion Mothershead	So
WR	81	Harrison Rosenberg	Jr
TE	82	Antonio Diaz	So
TE	84	Isaiah Moody	So
WR	86	Kaden Huttinger	So
TE	88	Corey Phillips	Jr
WR		Asher Browning	So
TE		Bauer Caspers	Fr
WR		Brody Cullin	Fr
QB		Gentry Dumont	Fr
WR		Caleb Garnand	Fr
QB		Jack Jepson	Fr
RB		Jaden Koger	Jr
OL		Jacob Marichalar	Fr
RB		Kade Mullins	Fr
RB		Chase Ragaller	Fr
OL		John Schuelka	Fr
QB		Jake Timmons	Fr

Defense

Pos.	#	Name	Class
CB	2	Junior Dukulay	Fr
DB	3	Tracy Davis	Jr
S	4	Kellen Moore	So
DB	5	Daviere Jones	Jr
CB	6	Krishawn Butler	Jr
S	8	Skylar James	Jr
DE	9	Jackson Filer	Jr
LB	10	John Argo	Jr
LB	12	Noah Seamer	So
S	13	Tucker Dickherber	Jr
DB	14	Carter Durflinger	So
S	15	Blake Tubbs	So
CB	18	Devon Sanders	So
LB	19	Mason Sheldahl	Jr
DB	20	Prince Brown	Sr
CB	22	Steve McCoy	So
DB	23	Lamont Washington	GS
S	27	Brady Duwa	Sr
LB	29	Michael Banks	So
DE	31	JT Freeman	So
CB	32	Mark Ard	So
LB	33	Cade Sheedy	Jr
LB	35	Kiegan Kitzman	So
MLB	41	Michael Acri	Sr
S	44	Matthew Trullinger	So
LB	45	Calvin Sieck	Sr
DE	46	Casey Trudo	Jr
DT	47	Nicholas Wacha	Jr
LB	48	Tayten Boyer	So
DE	52	Eli Moses	Fr
DT	54	Nolan Simpson	So
DT	55	Connor Knudtson	So
DL	57	Aaron Brown	Sr
DT	69	Jordan Jones-Whitaker	So
DT	83	Carson Hagan	So
DE	89	Jackson Friz	Sr
DT	90	Isaac Cook	Jr
DT	93	Joel Greiner	So
DT	94	Dane Johnson	Sr
DE	95	Diego Jackson	So
DT	97	Cameron Mieslahn	Jr
DT	99	Iziek Soper	Sr
DB		Jack Armstrong	Jr
LB		John Braun	Fr
CB		Treshaun Brooks	Fr
LB		Kamdyn Cross	Fr
S		Porter Doggett	Fr
LB		Drew Gerdes	Fr
DT		Stain Haynes	Fr
DE		Drew Hickey	Fr
LB		Maceo Hicks	Fr
CB		Kenyi James	Fr
DE		Leo Jones	Fr
DE		Colton Leichty	Fr
LB		Harry Leinen	Fr
LB		Tate Lyon	Fr
CB		Jacob Mohrfeld	Fr
LB		Nolan Morrison	Fr
S		Lesther Phanfil	Fr
LB		Jayden Swain	So
DE		Cole Thompson	Fr
DE		Jake Trenary	Fr

Special teams

Pos.	#	Name	Class
K	15	Cory Wood	So
P	24	Kody Kruschwitz	GS
P	28	Bradyn Cory	Fr
K, P	38	Jake Calvert	Jr
K	39	Justyn Hamm	Fr
LS	96	Adam Caudle	So

Head coach

- Joe Woodley (6th season)

Coordinators/assistant coaches

- Derek Fulton (offensive coordinator)
- E. J. Peterson (defensive coordinator)
- Jake Munkwitz (special teams coordinator)
- Adam Dutcher (offensive line)
- Nick Ellis (assistant offensive line)
- Andy Jepson (quarterbacks)
- Sean Johnson (tight ends)
- Felix King (assistant defensive backs)
- Josh Moncivais (defensive line)
- Jon Pilcher (offensive line)
- Kade Somers (student assistant/running backs)

Legend

- (C) Team captain
- (S) Suspended
- (I) Ineligible
- Injured
- Redshirt

Roster
Last update: July 22, 2025
