= Corey Fipps =

American football coach (born c. 1982)

Current position
- Title: Athletic director & head coach
- Team: Pikeville
- Conference: AAC
- Record: 27–25

Biographical details
- Born: c. 1982 (age 43–44); Maxwell, California, U.S.
- Education: Harding University (2004)

Playing career
- 2000–2003: Harding
- Position: Tackle

Coaching career (HC unless noted)
- 2004–2006: Harding (assistant)
- 2007: Frisco Thunder (assistant)
- 2008: First Baptist Academy (TX) (assistant)
- 2009–2011: Faulkner (OC)
- 2012: Sacramento City (AHC/OC)
- 2013: Montana Tech (OC/QB)
- 2014: Belhaven (co-OC/OL)
- 2015–2016: Missouri Southern (OC)
- 2017–2020: Kentucky Christian
- 2021–present: Pikeville

Administrative career (AD unless noted)
- 2024–present: Pikeville

Head coaching record
- Overall: 39–54
- Tournaments: 1–1 (NAIA playoffs)

Accomplishments and honors

Championships
- AAC (2024)

Corey Fipps (born c. 1982) is an American football coach and athletic director. He is the head football coach and athletic director for the University of Pikeville, holding the position of head football coach since 2021 and athletic director since 2024. He was the head football coach for Kentucky Christian University from 2017 to 2020.

== Career ==
Fipps played college football for Harding as an offensive tackle.

Fipps began his coaching career with his alma mater, Harding, before coaching for the Frisco Thunder of the Intense Football League (IFL) and First Baptist Academy of Dallas.

In 2009, Fipps was hired as the offensive coordinator for Faulkner. He coached All-American quarterback Josh Hollingsworth during his tenure. In 2012, Fipps was hired as the assistant head coach and offensive coordinator for Sacramento City. After one season he was hired as the offensive coordinator and quarterbacks coach for Montana Tech. In 2014, he served as the co-offensive coordinator and offensive line coach under head coach Hal Mumme at Belhaven. In 2015, Fipps was hired as the offensive coordinator for Missouri Southern.

In 2017, Fipps was hired as the head football coach for Kentucky Christian. In four seasons as head coach he led the team to a 12–29 record including one of their best seasons of all time in 2020 as they finished with a 6–2 record. In 2021, he was hired by Mid-South Conference (MSC) rival Pikeville as their head football coach. In three seasons he has amassed an overall record of 17–13 including a high of 7–3 in 2023.

In March 2024, Fipps was named athletic director for Pikeville.

== Head coaching record ==
Year	Team	Overall	Conference	Standing	Bowl/playoffs	NAIA Coaches'^{#}
Kentucky Christian Knights (Mid-South Conference) (2017–2020)
2017	Kentucky Christian	1–10	1–5	6th (Bluegrass)		
2018	Kentucky Christian	2–9	1–5	6th (Bluegrass)		
2019	Kentucky Christian	3–8	2–4	5th (Appalachian)		
2020–21	Kentucky Christian	6–2	4–2	3rd (Appalachian)		
Kentucky Christian:		12–29	8–16			
Pikeville Bears (Mid-South Conference) (2021–2022)
2021	Pikeville	4–6	2–5	T–6th (Bluegrass)		
2022	Pikeville	6–4	5–3	T–3rd		
Pikeville Bears (Appalachian Athletic Conference) (2023–present)
2023	Pikeville	7–3	5–1	2nd		
2024	Pikeville	6–6	5–1	T–1st	L NAIA Second Round	22
2025	Pikeville	4–6	4–2	T–2nd		
2026	Pikeville	0–0	0–0			
Pikeville:		27–25	21–12			
Total:		39–54				
