= 2024 Keiser Seahawks football team =

American college football season

2024 Keiser Seahawks football

Sun Conference champion

NAIA Championship Game, L 7–35 vs. Grand View
- Conference: Sun Conference
- Record: 12–1 (6–0 TSC)
- Head coach: Myles Russ (1st season)
- Offensive coordinator: Myles Notkin (1st season)
- Defensive coordinator: Peter Davila (1st season)
- Home stadium: Keiser Football Field

2024 Sun Conference football standings
	Conf.					Overall
Team	W		L		T	W		L		T
No. 2 Keiser $^	6	–	0	–	0	12	–	1	–	0
No. 9 St. Thomas (FL) ^	6	–	1	–	0	9	–	2	–	0
No. 18т Southeastern	5	–	2	–	0	8	–	2	–	0
Florida Memorial	4	–	3	–	0	6	–	4	–	1
Webber International	2	–	4	–	0	4	–	5	–	0
Ave Maria	2	–	4	–	0	3	–	7	–	0
Thomas	1	–	5	–	0	1	–	8	–	0
Warner	0	–	6	–	0	0	–	8	–	0
$ – Conference champion; ^ – NAIA playoff participant Florida Memorial's game against Clark Atlanta was delayed at halftime due to weather, but was never rescheduled and resulted in a tie; Rankings from NAIA Coaches' Poll

The 2024 Keiser Seahawks football team was an American football team that represented Keiser University as a member of the Sun Conference during the 2024 NAIA football season. In their first year under head coach Myles Russ, the Seahawks compiled a 12–1 record (6–0 in conference games) and won the Sun Conference. They advanced to the NAIA playoffs defeating Pikeville, Georgetown (KY), and Benedictine (KS) in the first three rounds. They lost to Grand View in the NAIA national championship game.

Dating to the 2023 season, the Seahawks had a 23-game winning streak.

== Schedule ==
Date	Opponent	Rank	Site	Result	Attendance	Source
September 5	at North Greenville*	No. 1	Younts Stadium; Tigerville, SC	W 23–20	2,023	
September 14	at Newberry*	No. 1	Setzler Field; Newberry, SC	W 42–33	4,000	
September 21	Fort Lauderdale*	No. 1	Keiser Football Field; West Palm Beach, FL	W 45–0	1,500	
October 5	at No. 6 St. Thomas (FL)	No. 1	AutoNation Field; Miami Gardens, FL	W 31–27	400	
October 12	Warner	No. 1	Keiser Football Field; West Palm Beach, FL	Cancelled		
October 19	at Southeastern	No. 1	Victory Field; Lakeland, FL	W 17–10	1,487	
October 26	at Thomas	No. 1	Veteran's Memorial Stadium; Thomasville, GA	W 52–17	345	
November 2	at Webber International	No. 1	Warrior Turf Field; Babson Park, FL	W 34–20	523	
November 9	Florida Memorial^{†}	No. 1	Keiser Football Field; West Palm Beach, FL	W 51–16	683	
November 16	Ave Maria	No. 1	Keiser Football Field; West Palm Beach, FL	W 52–21	679	
November 30	Pikeville*	No. 1	Keiser Football Field; West Palm Beach, FL (NAIA second round)	W 56–21	608	
December 7	No. 11 Georgetown (KY)*	No. 1	Keiser Football Field; West Palm Beach, FL (NAIA quarterfinal)	W 38–22	842	
December 14	No. 9 Benedictine (KS)*	No. 1	Keiser Football Field; West Palm Beach, FL (NAIA semifinal)	W 42–38	812	
December 21	vs. No. 2 Grand View*	No. 1	Durham County Memorial Stadium; Durham, NC (NAIA championship)	L 7–35		
*Non-conference game; ^{†}Homecoming; Rankings from NAIA Coaches' Poll released prior to the game
