= Ronald Talley =

American football player and coach (born 1986)

Lawrence Tech Blue Devils
- Title: Defensive line coach

Personal information
- Born: February 21, 1986 (age 40); Detroit, Michigan, U.S.
- Listed height: 6 ft 3 in (1.91 m)
- Listed weight: 286 lb (130 kg)

Career information
- High school: Renaissance (Detroit, Michigan)
- College: Notre Dame (2004–2006); Delaware (2007–2008)
- NFL draft: 2009: undrafted

Career history

Playing
- Green Bay Packers (2009–2010)*; Arizona Cardinals (2010–2013); Tampa Bay Buccaneers (2014)*; New York Jets (2015)*
- * Offseason or practice squad member only

Coaching
- Brother Rice HS (MI) (2022–2023) Defensive line coach; Lawrence Tech (2024–present) Defensive line coach

Awards and highlights
- CAA All–Conference (2008)

Career NFL statistics
- Total tackles: 14
- Sacks: 1
- Pass deflections: 1
- Stats at Pro Football Reference

Ronald Talley (born February 21, 1986) is an American college football coach and former defensive end. He is the defensive line coach for Lawrence Technological University, a position he has held since 2024. He was signed by the Green Bay Packers as an undrafted free agent in 2009 and later played for the Arizona Cardinals. He played college football for the University of Delaware and University of Notre Dame.

== Early life ==
Talley was born on February 21, 1986, in Detroit, Michigan. He grew up in Detroit, and attended Renaissance High School, where he played high school football. During his junior year in 2002, he recorded 122 tackles. He was named to the Detroit Free Press Division 4 All-State team and the All–Detroit first team as a senior in 2003. During that season, he recorded 80 tackles and five sacks.

Heading into college, he was recruited by the University of Notre Dame, University of Iowa, University of Louisville, Michigan State University, University of Minnesota, and University of Southern California. After receiving scholarship offers from Notre Dame, Iowa, Louisville, and Michigan State, he opted to sign-on to play college football for the Notre Dame Fighting Irish football team.

College recruiting
Name	Hometown	School	Height	Weight	40^{‡}	Commit date
Ronald Talley; DE	Detroit, Michigan	Renaissance High School (MI)	6 ft 3 in (1.91 m)	233 lb (106 kg)	4.76	Dec 16, 2003
Ronald Talley; DE	Recruit ratings: Scout: Rivals:					
Overall recruit ranking:
Note: In many cases, Scout, Rivals, 247Sports, On3, and ESPN may conflict in their listings of height and weight.; In these cases, the average was taken. ESPN grades are on a 100-point scale.; Sources: "2004 Team Ranking". Rivals.com.

== College career ==
=== Notre Dame ===
As a true freshman at Notre Dame in 2004, Talley was redshirted. However, in 2005, he played in 11 games for the Fighting Irish, starting five games. His first career start for Notre Dame came against Brigham Young, where he recorded seven tackles and one sack. He tallied 23 tackles, one sack, one fumble recovery, and two pass deflections. In the 2006 Fiesta Bowl against Ohio State, he recorded three tackles, a fumble recovery, and a pass deflection. Heading into his sophomore season in 2006, Talley was expected to provide veteran experience alongside fellow defensive ends Victor Abiamiri and Chris Frome, but six games into the season, he left the team. In those games, he recorded 11 tackles. His departure was reportedly mutually agreed upon by the coaching staff, after he was unhappy with his playing time.

=== Delaware ===
On December 19, 2006, he announced his intention to transfer to the University of Delaware. As a junior in 2007, he played in 13 games, starting eight of those and recorded 43 tackles and three sacks. The following year, as a senior, he started in all but one game for Delaware and recorded 46 tackles and 3.5 sacks. He was named to the Colonial Athletic Association All–Conference team after the season.

== Professional career ==
=== Green Bay Packers ===
After going undrafted in the 2009 NFL draft, Talley signed with the Green Bay Packers on May 1, 2009. He played in every pre-season game for the Packers that season, recording five tackles, before being waived during final cuts, only to be re-signed to the practice squad. He spent the whole season with the Packers' practice squad. After his practice squad contract expired at season's end, he signed a reserve/future contract with Green Bay. He was waived during final cuts again in 2010, for the second straight season.

=== Arizona Cardinals ===
On November 9, 2010, the Arizona Cardinals signed Talley to their practice squad and later re-signed him to reserve/future contract on January 6, 2011. After battling with Kenny Iwebema during training camp for a spot on the Cardinals' 53-man roster, Talley made the team. However, he was waived on September 5, to make room for the recently signed Chester Taylor. However, after clearing waivers, he was signed to their practice squad, only to be promoted to the active roster on September 20. Following the 2011 season, he became an exclusive-rights free agent, but was re-signed on April 16, 2012.

=== Tampa Bay Buccaneers ===
On June 13, 2014, he signed a contract with the Tampa Bay Buccaneers.

=== New York Jets ===
Talley was signed by the New York Jets on March 4, 2015. He was released on September 5, 2015.

== Coaching career ==
From 2022 to 2023, Talley was the defensive line coach for Brother Rice High School in Bloomfield Township, Michigan. In 2024, he was hired in the same position by Lawrence Tech under first-year head coach Scott Merchant.
