= NAIA independent football schools =

Institutional members

NAIA independent football schools are four-year institutional members of the National Association of Intercollegiate Athletics (NAIA) that play college football independent of any formal conference affiliation. In sports other than football, these schools compete in a college athletic conference affiliated with the NAIA called Continental Athletic Conference.

== NAIA football independents ==
Andrew and Faulkner will join the Appalachian Athletic Conference as associate members for football beginning in the 2027 season.

=== Current members ===
Institution	Location	Founded	Affiliation	Enrollment	Nickname	Since	Primary conference
Andrew College	Cuthbert, Georgia	1854	United Methodist	496	Fighting Tigers	2026	SSAC
Faulkner University	Montgomery, Alabama	1942	Churches of Christ	2,933	Eagles	2026	SSAC

== Yearly records ==
=== NAIA independents (1997–present) ===
1997 NAIA independents football records
	Conf.			Overall
Team	W		L	W		L
No. 14 McKendree ^		–		8	–	2
No. 18 Clinch Valley		–		6	–	3
Peru State		–		6	–	4
NW Oklahoma State		–		5	–	5
Azusa Pacific		–		4	–	5
Eastern Oregon		–		4	–	6
^ – NAIA playoff participant; Rankings from NAIA poll

1998 NAIA independents football records
	Conf.			Overall
Team	W		L	W		L
No. 8 Azusa Pacific ^		–		12	–	2
No. 21 NW Oklahoma State		–		7	–	3
No. 25 Eastern Oregon		–		6	–	4
Clinch Valley		–		4	–	5
Peru State		–		4	–	5
^ – NAIA playoff participant; Rankings from NAIA poll

1999 NAIA independents football records
	Conf.			Overall
Team	W		L	W		L
No. 1 NW Oklahoma State ^		–		13	–	0
No. 7 Azusa Pacific ^		–		9	–	3
Southern Oregon		–		7	–	2
Virginia–Wise		–		6	–	3
Peru State		–		3	–	7
^ – NAIA playoff participant

2000 NAIA independents football records
	Conf.			Overall
Team	W		L	W		L
No. 16 Azusa Pacific ^		–		6	–	4
Southern Oregon		–		5	–	4
Virginia–Wise		–		3	–	7
^ – NAIA playoff participant; Rankings from NAIA Coaches' Poll

2001 NAIA independents football records
	Conf.			Overall
Team	W		L	W		L
No. 5 Southern Oregon ^		–		9	–	2
Virginia–Wise		–		6	–	4
Azusa Pacific		–		4	–	5
Paul Quinn		–		3	–	4
Edward Waters		–		2	–	8
^ – NAIA playoff participant; Rankings from NAIA Coaches' Poll

2002 NAIA independents football records
	Conf.			Overall
Team	W		L	W		L
No. 16 Azusa Pacific		–		9	–	1
No. 6 Southern Oregon ^		–		8	–	3
Paul Quinn		–		7	–	4
Edward Waters		–		6	–	4
Morningside		–		5	–	5
Allen		–		0	–	7
^ – NAIA playoff participant; Rankings from NAIA Coaches' Poll

2003 NAIA independents football records
	Conf.			Overall
Team	W		L	W		L
No. 13 Azusa Pacific ^		–		8	–	2
Edward Waters		–		7	–	4
Texas College		–		7	–	3
Southern Oregon		–		5	–	4
Allen		–		4	–	6
Webber International		–		3	–	7
Paul Quinn		–		1	–	6
Southern Virginia		–		0	–	10
Waldorf		–		0	–	11
^ – NAIA playoff participant; Rankings from NAIA Coaches' Poll

2004 NAIA independents football records
	Conf.			Overall
Team	W		L	W		L
No. 4 Azusa Pacific ^		–		11	–	3
Edward Waters		–		7	–	3
Eastern Oregon		–		6	–	4
Webber International		–		4	–	5
Southern Oregon		–		3	–	6
Waldorf		–		3	–	7
Allen		–		2	–	6
Paul Quinn		–		1	–	7
Southern Virginia		–		0	–	8
^ – NAIA playoff participant; Rankings from NAIA Coaches' Poll

2005 NAIA independents football records
	Conf.			Overall
Team	W		L	W		L
Webber International *		–		6	–	2
Eastern Oregon		–		6	–	3
No. 12 Azusa Pacific ^		–		6	–	4
Allen		–		4	–	4
Southern Virginia *		–		3	–	5
Paul Quinn		–		3	–	6
Edward Waters		–		2	–	7
SAGU		–		2	–	8
Waldorf		–		2	–	9
Seton Hill		–		1	–	9
Southern Oregon		–		1	–	9
^ – NAIA playoff participant * – Webber International later forfeited two wins and Southern Virginia forfeited three.; Rankings from NAIA Coaches' Poll

2006 NAIA independents football records
	Conf.			Overall
Team	W		L	W		L
Webber International		–		5	–	5
Langston		–		5	–	4
Southern Oregon		–		3	–	6
Azusa Pacific		–		3	–	7
Paul Quinn		–		2	–	6
Southern Virginia *		–		2	–	7
SAGU		–		2	–	8
Waldorf		–		2	–	8
Haskell		–		2	–	9
Seton Hill		–		2	–	9
Edward Waters		–		1	–	9
* – Southern Virginia later forfeited a win.

2007 NAIA independents football records
	Conf.			Overall
Team	W		L	W		L
Southern Oregon		–		5	–	4
No. 21 Azusa Pacific		–		6	–	5
Peru State		–		6	–	5
Edward Waters		–		5	–	6
Southern Virginia		–		4	–	5
Webber International		–		3	–	6
Haskell		–		2	–	8
Waldorf		–		2	–	9
SAGU		–		1	–	9
Faulkner		–		0	–	9
Rankings from NAIA Coaches' Poll

2008 NAIA independents football records
	Conf.			Overall
Team	W		L	W		L
SAGU		–		4	–	5
Peru State		–		4	–	6
Southern Oregon		–		3	–	7
Southern Virginia		–		3	–	8
Webber International		–		3	–	8
Azusa Pacific		–		2	–	8
Edward Waters		–		2	–	8
Grand View		–		2	–	8
Haskell		–		2	–	9
Kentucky Christian		–		1	–	9
Waldorf		–		1	–	10

2009 NAIA independents football records
	Conf.			Overall
Team	W		L	W		L
No. 24 Ohio Dominican		–		7	–	3
Peru State		–		7	–	4
Webber International		–		4	–	6
Haskell		–		3	–	7
Azusa Pacific		–		3	–	8
Southern Oregon		–		2	–	7
Southern Virginia		–		0	–	8
Edward Waters		–		0	–	10
Rankings from NAIA Coaches' Poll

2010 NAIA independents football records
	Conf.			Overall
Team	W		L	W		L
No. 15 Azusa Pacific ^		–		7	–	3
No. 25 Webber International		–		7	–	4
Menlo		–		4	–	7
Peru State		–		4	–	7
Southern Oregon		–		3	–	7
Southern Virginia		–		3	–	7
Haskell		–		1	–	9
Edward Waters		–		0	–	8
^ – NAIA playoff participant; Rankings from NAIA Coaches' Poll

2011 NAIA independents football records
	Conf.			Overall
Team	W		L	W		L
No. 16 Valley City State ^		–		9	–	2
No. 5 Azusa Pacific ^		–		9	–	3
Menlo		–		5	–	5
Southern Oregon		–		5	–	5
Mayville State		–		5	–	6
Walsh		–		5	–	6
Dickinson State		–		4	–	6
Edward Waters		–		4	–	6
Malone		–		4	–	7
Robert Morris (IL)		–		4	–	6
Webber International		–		4	–	6
Jamestown		–		3	–	7
Southern Virginia		–		2	–	7
West Virginia Tech		–		1	–	9
Dakota State		–		1	–	10
Ave Maria		–		0	–	9
Haskell		–		0	–	11
^ – NAIA playoff participant; Rankings from NAIA Coaches' Poll

2012 NAIA independents football records
	Conf.			Overall
Team	W		L	W		L
Robert Morris (IL)		–		8	–	3
No. 24 Valley City State		–		7	–	3
Bacone		–		7	–	4
Langston		–		6	–	4
Edward Waters		–		5	–	6
Jamestown		–		4	–	6
Lindenwood–Belleville		–		4	–	6
Mayville State		–		4	–	6
Menlo		–		4	–	6
SAGU		–		4	–	6
Southern Virginia		–		4	–	6
Webber International		–		4	–	6
Point		–		2	–	8
Wayland Baptist		–		2	–	8
Dakota State		–		2	–	9
Texas College		–		2	–	9
Ave Maria		–		1	–	7
Haskell		–		1	–	8
Rankings from NAIA Coaches' Poll

2013 NAIA independents football records
	Conf.			Overall
Team	W		L	W		L
Ave Maria		–		8	–	2
Menlo		–		5	–	5
Webber International		–		5	–	5
Lindenwood–Belleville		–		4	–	7
Point		–		3	–	7
Edward Waters		–		2	–	9
Haskell		–		1	–	7
Warner		–		1	–	10

2014 NAIA independents football records
	Conf.			Overall
Team	W		L	W		L
Menlo		–		3	–	8
Arizona Christian		–		2	–	7
Lindenwood–Belleville		–		2	–	8
Missouri Baptist		–		1	–	10
Haskell		–		0	–	9

2016 NAIA independents football records
	Conf.			Overall
Team	W		L	W		L
Davenport		–		5	–	5

2018 NAIA independents football records
	Conf.			Overall
Team	W		L	W		L
Indiana Wesleyan		–		7	–	3
Lawrence Tech		–		5	–	3
Allen		–		2	–	6

2019 NAIA independents football records
	Conf.			Overall
Team	W		L	W		L
Allen		–		3	–	6
Edward Waters		–		1	–	10

2020 NAIA independents football records
	Conf.			Overall
Team	W		L	W		L
Edward Waters		–		1	–	2
Madonna		–		0	–	4

2021 NAIA independents football records
	Conf.			Overall
Team	W		L	W		L
Arkansas Baptist		–		0	–	7

2022 NAIA independents football records
	Conf.			Overall
Team	W		L	W		L
North American		–		3	–	9
Arkansas Baptist		–		1	–	7

2024 NAIA independents football records
	Conf.			Overall
Team	W		L	W		L
Simpson (CA)		–		0	–	9
Rankings from NAIA Coaches' Poll

2026 NAIA independents football records
	Conf.			Overall
Team	W		L	W		L
Andrew		–		0	–	0
Faulkner		–		0	–	0

== See also ==
- NAIA independent schools
