= Jerry Mynatt =

American football player and coach

Biographical details
- Born: c. 1968 (age 57–58)

Playing career
- 1988: East Tennessee State
- 1989–1990: Carson–Newman
- 1992: Orlando Predators
- Position: Wide receiver

Coaching career (HC unless noted)
- 1993–1995: Charleston Southern (WR/PGC)
- 1996: Elon (defensive assistant)
- 1997–1998: East Tennessee State (OA)
- 1999–2002: East Tennessee State (WR/PGC)
- 2003–2005: Pikeville
- 2007–2010: Brevard (AHC/WR)

Head coaching record
- Overall: 20-12 (college)
- Tournaments: 0–1 (NAIA playoffs)

Jerry Mynatt (born c. 1968) is an American former football player and coach. He served as the head football coach at Pikeville College—now known as the University of Pikeville—in Pikeville, Kentucky for three seasons, from 2003 to 2005, compiling a record of 20–12. Mynatt was selected "Coach of the Year" in the Mid-South Conference in 2005. Selected as one of the "Hottest Coaches in America" the same year by "American Football Monthly" magazine. Mynatt along with his entire 2005 squad was inducted into the University of Pikeville Sports Hall of Fame in 2019.

== Head coaching record ==
=== College ===
Year	Team	Overall	Conference	Standing	Bowl/playoffs	Coaches^{#}
Pikeville Bears (Mid-South Conference) (2003–2005)
2003	Pikeville	4–6	3–6	T–5th		
2004	Pikeville	8–3	8–2	2nd		23
2005	Pikeville	8-3	3–2	T–2nd (East)	L NAIA First Round	15
Pikeville:		20-12	12–10			
Total:		20-12				
