= Matt Myers (American football) =

American football coach (born 1986)

Current position
- Title: Director of internal operations
- Team: Central Michigan
- Conference: MAC

Biographical details
- Born: October 9, 1986 (age 40); Assaria, Kansas, U.S.
- Education: Kansas Wesleyan University (2015)

Playing career
- 2006: Kansas Wesleyan
- 2013–2015: Kansas Wesleyan
- Position: Linebacker

Coaching career (HC unless noted)
- 2016: Kansas Wesleyan (LB)
- 2017: Kansas Wesleyan (DL)
- 2018: Kansas Wesleyan (LB)
- 2019: Kansas Wesleyan (OC)
- 2020: Kansas Wesleyan (DC/S&C)
- 2021: Kansas Wesleyan (assoc. HC/DC/S&C)
- 2022–2024: Kansas Wesleyan

Administrative career (AD unless noted)
- 2025–present: Central Michigan (dir. of internal operations)

Head coaching record
- Overall: 18–10

Accomplishments and honors

Championships
- 1 KCAC Bissell Division (2023)

Awards
- As player Second Team All-KCAC (2015); As coach AFCA NAIA Assistant Coach of the Year (2021)

Matt Myers (born October 9, 1986) is an American college football coach. He is the director of internal operations for Central Michigan University, a position he has held since 2025. He was the head football coach for Kansas Wesleyan University from 2022 to 2024. He played college football for Kansas Wesleyan as a linebacker.

In 2021, Myers was named AFCA Assistant Coach of the Year.

== Head coaching record ==
Year	Team	Overall	Conference	Standing	Bowl/playoffs
Kansas Wesleyan Coyotes (Kansas Collegiate Athletic Conference) (2022–2024)
2022	Kansas Wesleyan	8–3	7–3	4th	
2023	Kansas Wesleyan	8–3	5–1	T–1st (Bissell)	
2024	Kansas Wesleyan	2–4 (Note: Long was fired after six games and was replaced by Chris Snyder and David Leonard for the remainder of the season.)	0–0	(Bissell)	
Kansas Wesleyan:		18–10	12–4		
Total:		18–10			
National championship Conference title Conference division title or championship game berth
