= Zak Willis =

American football coach (born 1967)

Biographical details
- Born: December 30, 1967 (age 58); Laurinburg, North Carolina, U.S.

Playing career
- 1986–1987: Furman
- Position: Defensive end

Coaching career (HC unless noted)
- 1992: Greenville (OLB)
- 1993: Greenville (DE)
- 1994: Greenville (DC)
- 1995: Greenville (AHC/DC)
- 1996–1999: South Carolina (GA)
- 2000–2002: Pikeville
- 2003–2008: Newberry
- 2009–2011: Michigan State (GA)
- 2011–2012: Miami (OH) (ST/RC)
- 2014–2016: Union (KY)

Head coaching record
- Overall: 61–60
- Tournaments: 1–1 (NCAA D-II playoffs)

Accomplishments and honors

Championships
- 2 SAC (2006, 2008)

Awards
- SAC Coach of the Year (2006)

Zak Willis (born December 30, 1967) is an American former college football coach. He served as the head football coach at Pikeville College—now the University of Pikeville—from 2000 to 2002, at Newberry College from 2003 to 2008, and at Union College in Barbourville, Kentucky, from 2014 to 2016.

== Coaching career ==
Willis began his collegiate football career playing as a defensive end for the Furman Paladins from 1986 to 1987. He started his coaching career at Greenville College in Illinois, serving in various defensive roles, including defensive coordinator and assistant head coach, from 1992 to 1995. From 1996 to 1999, he was a graduate assistant at the University of South Carolina under head coaches Brad Scott and Lou Holtz, working as a tight ends coach and assistant to the recruiting coordinator.

Willis was the first head football coach at Pikeville College in Pikeville, Kentucky. He held that position for three seasons, from 2000 until 2002. His coaching record at Pikeville was 16–12.

In December 2002, Willis was named head coach at Newberry College in Newberry, South Carolina. Willis's teams won the only two South Atlantic Conference (SAC) championships in Newberry's history (2006, 2008 co-champions). During this period, Newberry posted the highest team GPA for any college football team in the SAC for the 2006 and 2007 seasons. His teams were ranked in the top 25 in the nation for 29 consecutive weeks between 2006 and 2008, and posted a 15-game home win streak over his final three seasons. Willis's overall record at Newberry College was 39–25. Willis was dismissed from Newberry shortly after the 2009 spring game.

In 2009, Willis joined the staff at Michigan State University as a graduate assistant, working with the offensive line and in recruiting. He remained at Michigan State for the 2009 and 2010 seasons.

In February 2011, Willis was hired by head coach Don Treadwell to serve as the special teams and recruiting coordinator at Miami University in Oxford, Ohio. He was on the Miami coaching staff for the 2011 and 2012 seasons.

In 2014, Willis was hired as the head coach at Union College in Barbourville, Kentucky. That fall the Bulldogs went 1–9. They had another 1–9 season in 2015. Willis resigned after nine games of the 2016 season. Andre Linn was appointed as interim head coach to replace him.

== Head coaching record ==
Year	Team	Overall	Conference	Standing	Bowl/playoffs
Pikeville Bears (Club) (2000)
2000	Pikeville	7–1			
Pikeville Bears (Mid-South Conference) (2001–2002)
2001	Pikeville	3–7	2–5	7th	
2002	Pikeville	6–4	4–4	T–4th	
Pikeville:		16–12	6–9		
Newberry Indians / Wolves (South Atlantic Conference) (2003–2008)
2003	Newberry	3–7	2–5	T–5th	
2004	Newberry	5–6	1–6	8th	
2005	Newberry	5–4	4–3	3rd	
2006	Newberry	11–2	6–1	1st	L NCAA Division II Second Round
2007	Newberry	9–2	4–2	T–3rd	
2008	Newberry	6–4	5–2	T–1st	
Newberry:		39–25	22–19		
Union (Kentucky) Bulldogs (Mid-South Conference) (2014–2016)
2014	Union	1–9	1–5	T–6th (East)	
2015	Union	1–9	1–5	5th (East)	
2016	Union	4–5	3–2	(East)	
Union:		6–23	5–12		
Total:		61–60			
National championship Conference title Conference division title
