= Joe Woodley =

American football player and coach

Current position
- Title: Linebackers coach
- Team: Rutgers
- Conference: Big Ten

Playing career
- 1999–2003: Iowa State
- Position: Linebacker

Coaching career (HC unless noted)
- 2004–2005: St. Ambrose (DB/LB)
- 2006–2007: Johnston HS (IA) (DL/LB)
- 2008–2017: Grand View (DC)
- 2018: Grand View (OC)
- 2019–2024: Grand View
- 2025: Drake
- 2026–present: Rutgers (LB)

Head coaching record
- Overall: 80–9
- Tournaments: 0–1 (NCAA D-I playoffs); 13–5 (NAIA playoffs)

Accomplishments and honors

Championships
- 1 NAIA (2024); 1 PFL (2025); 6 HAAC North Division (2019–2024)

Joe Woodley is an American college football coach. He is an assistant coach for Rutgers University, a position he has held since 2026. Previously, he was the head football coach at Drake University for one season, in 2025. Woodley served the head football coach for Grand View University from 2019 to 2024—winning the NAIA national championship in his final season. Woodley was an assistant coach at Grand View from 2008 to 2018 under his father, Mike Woodley, who was the first head coach for the program. The younger Woodley played college football as a linebacker at Iowa State University and was co-captain of the Cyclones' 2003 team.

== Head coaching record ==
Year	Team	Overall	Conference	Standing	Bowl/playoffs	NAIA^{#}
Grand View Vikings (Heart of America Athletic Conference) (2019–2024)
2019	Grand View	13–1	5–0	1st (North)	L NAIA Semifinal	3
2020–21	Grand View	7–1	3–0	1st (North)	L NAIA Quarterfinal	4
2021	Grand View	14–1	5–0	1st (North)	L NAIA Championship	2
2022	Grand View	13–1	5–0	1st (North)	L NAIA Semifinal	4
2023	Grand View	11–1	5–0	1st (North)	L NAIA Quarterfinal	2
2024	Grand View	14–0	6–0	1st (North)	W NAIA Championship	1
Grand View:		72–5	29–0			
Drake Bulldogs (Pioneer Football League) (2025)
2025	Drake	8–4	7–1	1st	L NCAA Division I First Round	
Drake:		8–4	7–1			
Total:		80–9				
National championship Conference title Conference division title or championship game berth
^{#}Rankings from final NAIA Coaches' Poll.
