= Scott Merchant =

American football coach (born c. 1970)

Current position
- Title: Head coach
- Team: Bloomfield Hills HS (MI)
- Record: 2–7

Biographical details
- Born: c. 1970 (age 55–56); Detroit, Michigan, U.S.

Playing career
- 1988–1991: Albion
- Positions: Quarterback, linebacker

Coaching career (HC unless noted)
- 1993–1994: Albion (OLB)
- 1995–1997: Albion (DC)
- 1998–2006: University of Detroit Jesuit HS (MI)
- 2007–2008: Brother Rice HS (MI) (assistant)
- 2009–2023: Chippewa Valley HS (MI)
- 2024: Lawrence Tech
- 2025–present: Bloomfield Hills HS (MI)

Head coaching record
- Overall: 2–8 (college); 157–100 (high school)

Scott Merchant (born c. 1970) is an American football coach. He is the head football coach for Bloomfield Hills High School, a position he has held since 2025. He was the head football coach for University of Detroit Jesuit High School and Academy from 1998 to 2006, Chippewa Valley High School from 2009 to 2023, and Lawrence Technological University in 2024. He also coached for Albion and Brother Rice High School. He played college football for Albion.

== Head coaching record ==
=== College ===
Year	Team	Overall	Conference	Standing	Bowl/playoffs
Lawrence Tech Blue Devils (Mid-States Football Association) (2024)
2024	Lawrence Tech	2–8	1–4	5th (MEL)	
Lawrence Tech:		2–8	1–4		
Total:		2–8			

=== High school ===
Year	Team	Overall	Conference	Standing	Bowl/playoffs
University of Detroit Jesuit Cubs () (1998–2006)
1998	University of Detroit Jesuit	4–5	1–3	4th	
1999	University of Detroit Jesuit	10–3	3–1	2nd	
2000	University of Detroit Jesuit	7–5	1–3		
2001	University of Detroit Jesuit	10–3	2–2		
2002	University of Detroit Jesuit	5–4	2–2		
2003	University of Detroit Jesuit	4–5	1–3		
2004	University of Detroit Jesuit	4–5	0–4	5th	
2005	University of Detroit Jesuit	4–5	1–4	5th	
2006	University of Detroit Jesuit	4–5	1–4	5th	
University of Detroit Jesuit:		52–40	12–26		
Chippewa Valley Big Reds () (2009–2023)
2009	Chippewa Valley	5–5	2–3	4th	
2010	Chippewa Valley	2–7	1–4	4th	
2011	Chippewa Valley	3–6	1–4	5th	
2012	Chippewa Valley	5–5	2–3	5th	
2013	Chippewa Valley	9–2	4–1	2nd	
2014	Chippewa Valley	8–4	2–3	4th	
2015	Chippewa Valley	7–3	3–2	3rd	
2016	Chippewa Valley	6–4	2–3	4th	
2017	Chippewa Valley	10–2	4–1	2nd	
2018	Chippewa Valley	14–0	5–0	1st	
2019	Chippewa Valley	9–1	5–0	1st	
2020	Chippewa Valley	3–4	2–3	4th	
2021	Chippewa Valley	7–4	3–2	4th	
2022	Chippewa Valley	7–3	3–2	2nd	
2023	Chippewa Valley	8–3	4–1	2nd	
Chippewa Valley:		103–53	43–32		
Bloomfield Hills Black Hawks () (2025–present)
2025	Bloomfield Hills	2–7	0–6	7th	
Bloomfield Hills:		2–7	0–6		
Total:		157–100			
National championship Conference title Conference division title or championship game berth
