= E. J. Peterson =

American football player and coach (born 1989)

Current position
- Title: Head coach
- Team: Grand View
- Conference: HAAC
- Record: 14–0

Biographical details
- Born: April 22, 1989 (age 37)

Playing career
- c. 2008: Iowa Central
- 2009–2010: Grand View
- 2011: Iowa Barnstormers
- Position: Linebacker

Coaching career (HC unless noted)
- 2012–2013: McPherson (LB/S&C)
- 2014–2017: McPherson (DC)
- 2018–2024: Grand View (DC)
- 2025–present: Grand View

Head coaching record
- Overall: 14–0
- Tournaments: 4–0 (NAIA playoffs)

Accomplishments and honors

Championships
- 1 NAIA (2025); 1 HAAC North Division (2025)

E. J. Peterson (born April 22, 1989) is an American college football coach and former player. He is the head football coach for Grand View University in Des Moines, Iowa, a position he has held since 2025. Peterson led the Grand View Vikings to an NAIA football national championship in 2025.

Peterson played football at Prairie City-Monroe High School in Monroe, Iowa and then at Iowa Central Community College before being recruited by Joe Woodley to play at Grand View.

== Head coaching record ==
Year	Team	Overall	Conference	Standing	Bowl/playoffs	NAIA^{#}
Grand View Vikings (Heart of America Athletic Conference) (2025–present)
2025	Grand View	14–0	6–0	1st (North)	W NAIA Championship	1
2026	Grand View	0–0	0–0	(North)		
Grand View:		14–0	6–0			
Total:		14–0				
National championship Conference title Conference division title or championship game berth
^{#}Rankings from final NAIA Coaches' Poll.
