= Grand View Vikings =

Athletic teams of Grand View University, Iowa

- University: Grand View University
- Nickname: Vikings
- Association: NAIA
- Conference: HAAC (primary)
- Athletic director: Troy Plummer
- Location: Des Moines, Iowa
- Varsity teams: 25
- Football stadium: Williams Stadium
- Basketball arena: Sisam Arena
- Colors: Red and White
- Mascot: Viktor
- Website: gvvikings.com

The Grand View Vikings are the athletic teams that represent Grand View University, located in Des Moines, Iowa, in intercollegiate sports as a member of the National Association of Intercollegiate Athletics (NAIA), primarily competing in the Heart of America Athletic Conference (HAAC) since the 2015–16 academic year. The Vikings previously competed in the defunct Midwest Collegiate Conference (MCC) from 1989–90 to 2014–15 (when the conference dissolved).

== History ==
Grand View joined the National Association of Intercollegiate Athletics (NAIA) after it moved from junior college status in 1979. Grand View added women's soccer in 1998 and re-instated competitive dance (2002), cross country (2003), golf (2004) and track (2006) in the early 2000's. Men's wrestling and football were added in 2008, and women's wrestling was added in 2019. Men's volleyball and varsity cheerleading were added in 2011.

=== Conference affiliations ===
- Pre-1979 – NJCAA Independent
- 1979–80 to 1988–89 – NAIA Independent
- 1989–90 to 2014–15 – Midwest Collegiate Conference
- 2015–16 to present – Heart of America Athletic Conference

== Varsity sports ==
Grand View competes in 25 intercollegiate varsity sports: Men's sports include baseball, basketball, bowling, cross country, football, golf, soccer, tennis, track & field, volleyball and wrestling; while women's sports include basketball, bowling, competitive dance, cross country, golf, soccer, softball, tennis, track & field, volleyball and wrestling; and co-ed sports include cheerleading, eSports (which was established in the fall of 2017) and shooting sports. The squads are supported by the athletic department.

Men's Sports	Head coach	Women's Sports	Head coach
Volleyball	Felipe Nogueira	Volleyball	Tina Carter
Cross Country	Jerry Monner	Cross Country	Jerry Monner
Soccer	David Groves	Soccer	Ventsi Stoimirov
Football	E. J. Peterson	Competitive Dance	Stacie Horton
Basketball	Denis Schaefer	Basketball	Kelli Greenway
Bowling	Melody Felton	Bowling	Melody Felton
Track & Field	Jerry Monner	Track & Field	Jerry Monner
Tennis	Austin Grundy	Tennis	Austin Grundy
Golf	Chris Winkel	Golf	Chris Winkel
Baseball	Doug Brinker	Softball	Lou Yacinich
Wrestling	Nick Mitchell	Wrestling	Angelo Crinzi
ESports	Nathan Ragsdell	Competitive Cheerleading	Nick Black

=== Football ===
Grand View announced that it will be creating a football team in the fall of 2008 with the hiring of Mike Woodley in July 2007. Woodley has over 30 years of coaching experience and prior to Grand View, Woodley was head coach at Sam Rayburn High School in Pasadena, Texas. Woodley is a familiar name in the Iowa football community, after serving as head coach at conference rival Saint Ambrose University in Davenport, Iowa from 1991 to 1993 and assistant coach at Iowa State University from 1994 to 2003. Woodley is a 1974 University of Northern Iowa graduate and four-year football letterman. He still holds the Panthers' school record for 20 career interceptions.

In a press release by the Grand View athletic department, Woodley stated, "Anybody who’s been in this business long enough knows that the opportunity to start a program from scratch is very rare. There are so many exhilarating things happening on campus with the addition of athletic programs, new student housing, and new buildings. Grand View is headed in the right direction, and I want to be a part of it."

Grand View played independently of a league in 2008 before officially joining the Midwest League of the Mid-States Football Association, in 2009. In 2015, the school joined the Heart of America Athletic Conference in all sports.

Grand View played Briar Cliff University in its historical debut on Saturday, August 30, 2008, at Williams Stadium, Grand View's new home field. Grand View won 20–17.

Grand View would win their first national championship in 2013 under Mike Woodley with a 35–23 win over University of the Cumberlands (KY). The team finished the season undefeated, posting a 14–0 record. Under head coach Joe Woodley the program achieved their second national championship over a decade later in 2024 with a 35–7 win over Keiser University. The following season under first-year head coach E. J. Peterson, Grand View would defend their national championship from last season with a 22–16 victory over Keiser University in a rematch to go back-to-back. The 2024 and 2025 teams finished with an accumulative 28–0 record over a two season span.

=== Wrestling ===
Construction began in the fall of 2007 on an addition to the southeast side of the existing Johnson Wellness Center for a wrestling team area.

On March 6, 2008, Grand View announced the establishment of a men's wrestling squad with the hiring of new head wrestling coach Nick Mitchell. Mitchell was a graduate of Wartburg College, where he was an assistant wrestling coach leading up to his hiring at Grand View. The Grand View wrestling program became the first Des Moines collegiate wrestling program since Drake University dropped their program after their 1992–1993 season. Grand View men's wrestling officially started for the 2008–2009 season.

The Grand View men's wrestling program had great success in its first decade. The Vikings won the NAIA Wrestling Championship nine consecutive times from 2012 to 2020, a record tied with the Iowa Hawkeyes for the longest championship streak by a college wrestling program at any level. In December 2020, Grand View won its 95th consecutive dual, setting the all-time record for most consecutive dual victories by any college wrestling program at any level.

On February 4, 2019, Grand View announced it would launch a women's wrestling program for the 2019–2020 season. Angelo Crinzi was named Grand View's first women's wrestling coach one month later. Crinzi wrestled at Grand View in both 2012–13 and 2013–14 and spent four years as the head coach of both the men's and women's wrestling programs at Lindenwood University – Belleville in Illinois.

== Esports ==
Grand View University began competing in esports the fall of 2017 becoming the first higher education institute in Iowa to introduce a varsity program as well as offer esports scholarships. Grand View is a member of the National Association of Collegiate Esports.

Hired in 2018 as Grand View's director of esports, Dana Hustedt became the first female collegiate esports director in the United States.

Grand View fields varsity teams for game titles League of Legends, Overwatch, Rocket League, Fortnite, Valorant, and Super Smash Bros. Ultimate as well as junior varsity teams where roster sizes demand.

== Athletic facilities ==
=== Charles S. Johnson Wellness Center/Sisam Arena ===
Located at 1500 Morton Avenue, the Charles S. Johnson Wellness Center opened in 2002 and is the largest building on campus as of summer 2007. The 80,000-square-foot (7,400 m^{2}) facility can be considered the nerve center of the Viking athletic program. The women's volleyball team plays home games in the fieldhouse, and the men's and women's basketball teams play home games in Sisam Arena. Home wrestling events are also held in Sisam Arena. The lobby of the arena contains trophy cases which make up the Grand View Athletic Hall of Fame. Sisam Arena was named after David Sisam, longtime coach and athletic director.

Sisam Arena was renovated in 2002 while the wellness center was being built and received new bleachers, backboards, wall padding and a small media platform.

The upper fieldhouse contains 1/10-mile track, weight lifting equipment open to athletes and Grand View students, faculty and staff and a double basketball court resides on the ground level.

In 2008, a new two-level addition was added on the southeast corner to provide a new weight room, a wrestling room and athletics staff offices. The 3,100-square-foot (290 m^{2}) weight room facility exclusively for athletes has ten "Power Lift" stations and a collective 9,020 pounds (4,090 kg) in plates, dumbbells and bars.

=== Grand View Esports Arena ===
Located in the basement of Nielsen Hall dormitory, the gaming arena includes 26 gaming stations, gaming chairs and desks, along with a VOD review area with couches, chairs, and student lockers.

=== Luhrs Athletic Complex ===
Luhrs Athletic Complex, located behind the wellness center at 1500 Morton Avenue, is composed of one field each for soccer, baseball, softball as well as an open grassy practice area adjacent to the baseball field on Sheridan Avenue. Luhrs was renovated in 2004. Residential houses sit immediately on the other side of the fence of the soccer field.

=== Williams Stadium ===
Grand View plays at Des Moines East's Williams Stadium, located away from campus at 1591 East University Avenue, The college and East High will be in a working partnership. Grand View has committed to spending $800,000 on a new locker room facility and will raise an additional $1.2 million for other track and field renovations at the stadium. Grand View and the East High Foundation, an organization for alumni, staff, faculty and the east-side community, will partner in the fundraising. Artificial turf was installed, allowing both East High and Grand View to play and practice on the field, for the 2009 season. A sports pavilion, new goal posts, and a new college-regulation track will also be part of the renovation plan.

=== Other facilities and venues ===
- Ewing Park, a park owned and maintained by the City of Des Moines, is the home of Grand View's cross-country team and hosts the Viking Invitational each year. Ewing Park is located south of the Grand View campus.
- Briarwood Golf Course is a golf course located north of the campus in Ankeny, Iowa, a city north of Des Moines, Iowa Briarwood, an 18-hole, par-72 course is used for practice.

== Championships ==
=== NAIA team championships ===
- Men's (21):
  - Football (3): 2013, 2024, 2025
  - Men's Golf (1): 2017
  - Men's Soccer (1): 2025
  - Men's Volleyball (2): 2021,2022
  - Men's Wrestling (14): 2012, 2013, 2014, 2015, 2016, 2017, 2018, 2019, 2020, 2022, 2023, 2024, 2025, 2026

=== Other national team championships ===
- Men's:
  - NAIA Men's Volleyball National Invitational: 2018
