= Missouri Baptist Spartans football =

College football team

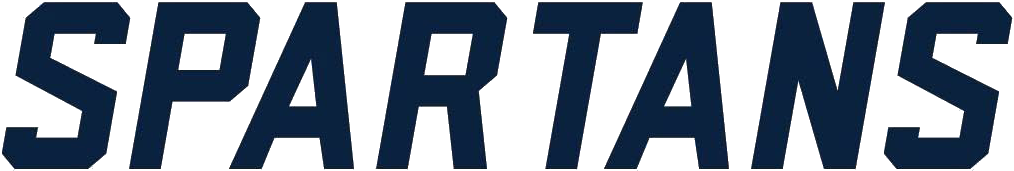
- First season: 2014; 12 years ago
- Athletic director: Jeff Fore
- Head coach: Marc Lillibridge; 1st season, 2–8 (.200)
- Location: Creve Coeur, Missouri
- Stadium: Spartan Field (capacity: 1,000)
- Conference: HAAC
- Division: South Division
- Colors: Blue and gray
- All-time record: 36–98 (.269)
- Mascot: Spartans
- Website: mbuspartans.com/football

The Missouri Baptist Spartans football team represents Missouri Baptist University in college football in the National Association of Intercollegiate Athletics (NAIA). The Spartans are members of the Heart of America Athletic Conference (HAAC), fielding its team in the HAAC since 2023. The Spartans play their home games at Spartan Field in Creve Coeur, Missouri.

Their head coach is Marc Lillibridge, who took over the position after Jason Burianek the team's inaugural coach from 2014 to 2025.

== Conference affiliations ==
- Independent (2014)
- Mid-States Football Association (2015–2022)
- Heart of America Athletic Conference (2023–present)

== List of head coaches ==
=== Key ===
Key to symbols in coaches list
General		Overall		Conference		Postseason (Note: Although the first Rose Bowl Game was played in 1902, it has been continuously played since the 1916 game, and is recognized as the oldest bowl game by the NCAA. "—" indicates any season prior to 1916 when postseason games were not played.)	
No.	Order of coaches (Note: A running total of the number of head coaches, with coaches who served separate tenures being counted only once. Interim head coaches are represented with "Int" and are not counted in the running total. "—" indicates the team played but either without a coach or no coach is on record. "X" indicates an interim year without play.)	GC	Games coached	CW	Conference wins	PW	Postseason wins
DC	Division championships	OW	Overall wins	CL	Conference losses	PL	Postseason losses
CC	Conference championships	OL	Overall losses	CT	Conference ties	PT	Postseason ties
NC	National championships	OT	Overall ties (Note: Overtime rules in college football were introduced in 1996, making ties impossible in the period since.)	C%	Conference winning percentage		
†	Elected to the College Football Hall of Fame	O%	Overall winning percentage (Note: When computing the win–loss percentage, a tie counts as half a win and half a loss.)				

=== Coaches ===
List of head football coaches showing season(s) coached, overall records and conference records
No.	Name	Season(s)	GC	OW	OL	OT	O%	CW	CL	CT	C%
1	Jason Burianek	2014–2025	124	34	90	0	0.274	17	51	0	0.250
2	Marc Lillibridge	2026-Present	2	2	8	0	0.200	0	6	0	0.000

=== Staff ===
Missouri Baptist Spartans Staff
Head coach: Head coach – Marc Lillibridge; Offensive coaches: Passing Game Coordinator / QB Coach – Jamie Martin (American football); Run Game Coordinator / Offensive Line Coach Chuck Case; Running backs – Louis Findley; Wide receivers – Derek Stanley; Director of Football Ops/ Tight Ends - Gus Christensen	Defensive coaches: Defensive coordinator/Inside Linebackers – Derrick Berry; Defensive line – Mike Wells (defensive lineman); Outside Linebackers – Patrick Rifino; Defensive Backs Coach - Jordan Osborne; Defensive Graduate Assistant - Rondale Messer; Defensive Graduate Assistant - Tavante Beckett

Special Teams

- Assistant Special Teams Coach – David Brader
- Assistant Special Teams Coach – Derrick Frost

=== Notable Members of the Program ===
Jason Burianek- Former Colorado Wide Receiver who was the first Head Coach in Missouri Baptist history from 2014 to 2025.

Clyde Simmons- 15-year NFL veteran, and 2019 Defensive Line Coach. Current Defensive Line Coach at Bowling Green (2025-present).

Charles Coe (American football)- Coe spent 13 years with the program from 2014-2025. He was also the Head Coach at Alabama State from 2003 to 2006 earning a 29-18 record which include to SWAC East Championships.

Joe Bowden- A 9-year NFL veteran, Bowden served four seasons as Defensive Coordinator and Linebackers Coach (2017-2020). Bowden currently serves as the Linebackers Coach at Bowling Green.

Marc Lillibridge- 2nd Head Coach of Missouri Baptist University beginning in 2026. Lillibridge played five seasons in the NFL, including serving as a scout for the Green Bay Packers, and Kansas City Chiefs. Lillibridge also served as General Manager for the Houston Roughnecks, and San Antonio Brahmas.

Jamie Martin (American football)- 16-year NFL veteran, who took over as Passing Game Coordinator/QB Coach in 2026.

Derek Stanley- 2007 NFL Draft pick with the Rams, who began coaching Wide Receivers in 2026.

Mike Wells (defensive lineman)- 8-year NFL veteran, coaching defensive line in 2026.

Tavante Beckett- Former NFL Linebacker with the Detroit Lions, along with the Houston Roughnecks, San Antonio Brahmas, and Orlando Storm.

== Year-by-year results ==
National champions	Conference champions	Bowl game berth	Playoff berth

Season	Year	Head coach	Association	Division	Conference	Record							Postseason	Final ranking
Season	Year	Head coach	Association	Division	Conference	Overall			Conference				Postseason	Final ranking
Season	Year	Head coach	Association	Division	Conference	Win	Loss	Tie	Finish	Win	Loss	Tie	Postseason	Final ranking
Missouri Baptist Spartans
2014	2014	Jason Burianek	NAIA		Independent	1	10	0					—	—
2015	2015	Jason Burianek	NAIA		MSFA	0	10	0	7th (Mideast)	0	6	0	—	—
2016	2016	Jason Burianek	NAIA		MSFA	3	8	0	T–4th (Mideast)	2	4	0	—	—
2017	2017	Jason Burianek	NAIA		MSFA	3	8	0	6th (Mideast)	1	5	0	—	—
2018	2018	Jason Burianek	NAIA		MSFA	4	7	0	5th (Mideast)	2	4	0	—	—
2019	2019	Jason Burianek	NAIA		MSFA	2	9	0	6th (Midwest)	1	5	0	—	—
2020	2019	Jason Burianek	NAIA		MSFA	1	6	0	6th (Midwest)	1	6	0	—	—
2021	2021	Jason Burianek	NAIA		MSFA	4	7	0	T–7th (Midwest)	1	6	0	—	—
2022	2022	Jason Burianek	NAIA		MSFA	4	7	0	T–5th (Midwest)	2	5	0	—	—
2023	2023	Jason Burianek	NAIA		HAAC	2	8	0	(South)	1	4	0	—	—
2024	2024	Jason Burianek	NAIA		HAAC	6	4	0	(South)	3	3	0	—	—
2025	2025	Jason Burianek	NAIA		HAAC	4	6	0	(South)	3	3	0	—	—
2026	2026	Marc Lillibridge	NAIA		HAAC	2	8	0	(South)	0	6	0	—	—
2027	2027	Marc Lillibridge	NAIA		HAAC	0	0	0	(South)	0	0	0		
