= Keiser Seahawks football =

College football team

2024 Keiser Seahawks football team
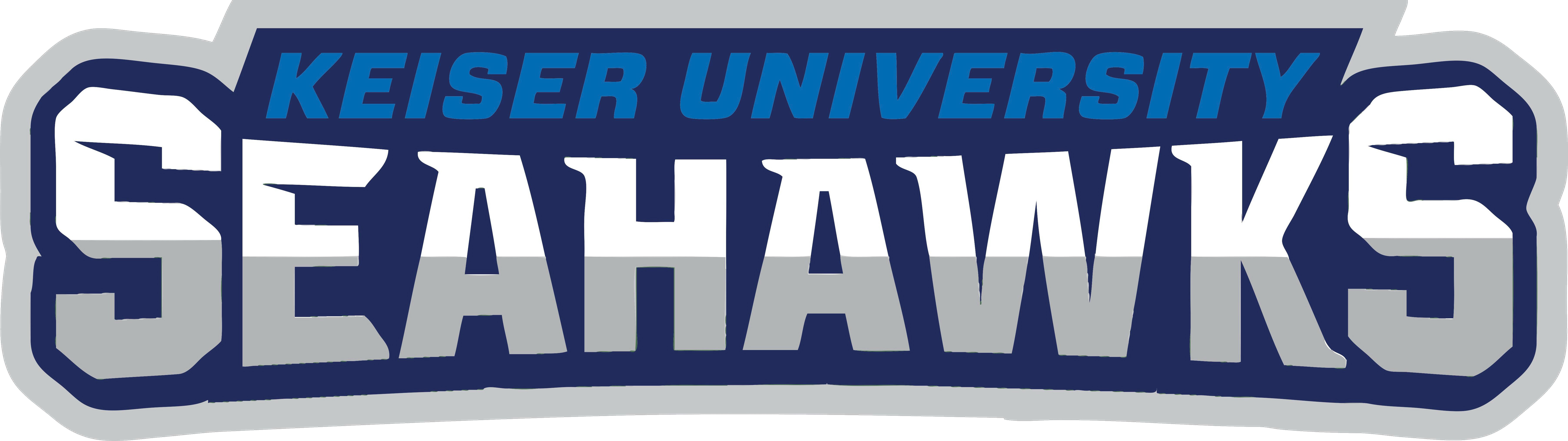
- First season: 2018; 8 years ago
- Athletic director: Kris Swogger
- Head coach: Myles Russ; 2nd season, 24–2 (.923)
- Location: West Palm Beach, Florida
- Stadium: Keiser Multi-Purpose Field (capacity: 9,000)
- Conference: Sun Conference
- Colors: Navy and Columbia blue
- All-time record: 78–17 (.821)
- Playoff record: 16–6 (.727)

NAIA national championships
- 2023

Conference championships
- TSC: 2022, 2023, 2024, 2025

Division championships
- MSC Sun: 2019, 2020, 2021
- Mascot: Seahawks
- Website: kuseahawks.com/football

The Keiser Seahawks football team represents Keiser University in college football in the National Association of Intercollegiate Athletics (NAIA). The Seahawks are members of the Sun Conference (TSC), fielding its team in the TSC since 2022. The Seahawks play their home games at Keiser Multi-Purpose Field in West Palm Beach, Florida.

Their head coach is Myles Russ, who took over the position in 2024.

== Conference affiliations ==
- Mid-South Conference (2018–2021)
- Sun Conference (2022–present)

== List of head coaches ==
=== Key ===
Key to symbols in coaches list
General		Overall		Conference		Postseason (Note: Although the first Rose Bowl Game was played in 1902, it has been continuously played since the 1916 game, and is recognized as the oldest bowl game by the NCAA. "—" indicates any season prior to 1916 when postseason games were not played.)	
No.	Order of coaches (Note: A running total of the number of head coaches, with coaches who served separate tenures being counted only once. Interim head coaches are represented with "Int" and are not counted in the running total. "—" indicates the team played but either without a coach or no coach is on record. "X" indicates an interim year without play.)	GC	Games coached	CW	Conference wins	PW	Postseason wins
DC	Division championships	OW	Overall wins	CL	Conference losses	PL	Postseason losses
CC	Conference championships	OL	Overall losses	CT	Conference ties	PT	Postseason ties
NC	National championships	OT	Overall ties (Note: Overtime rules in college football were introduced in 1996, making ties impossible in the period since.)	C%	Conference winning percentage		
†	Elected to the College Football Hall of Fame	O%	Overall winning percentage (Note: When computing the win–loss percentage, a tie counts as half a win and half a loss.)				

=== Coaches ===
List of head football coaches showing season(s) coached, overall records, conference records, postseason records, championships and selected awards
No.	Name	Season(s)	GC	OW	OL	O%	CW	CL	C%	PW	PL	DC	CC	NC	Awards
1	Doug Socha	2018–2023	69	54	15	0.783	33	3	0.917	10	4	0.714	2 TSC (2022–2023)	1 NAIA (2023)	TSC Coach of the Year (2022); 2× AFCA Region 1 Coach of the Year (2019, 2023)
2	Myles Russ	2024–present	26	24	2	0.923	13	0	1.000	6	2	0.750	1 TSC (2024)	—	TSC Coach of the Year (2024); 1× AFCA Region 1 Coach of the Year (2024)

== Year-by-year results ==
National champions	Conference champions	Bowl game berth	Playoff berth

Season	Year	Head coach	Assoc.	Division	Conference	Record					Postseason	Final ranking
Season	Year	Head coach	Assoc.	Division	Conference	Overall		Conference			Postseason	Final ranking
Season	Year	Head coach	Assoc.	Division	Conference	Win	Loss	Finish	Win	Loss	Postseason	Final ranking
2018	2018	Doug Socha	NAIA	—	MSC	6	4	3rd (Sun)	4	2	—	—
2019	2019	Doug Socha	NAIA	—	MSC	9	1	1st (Sun)	6	0	L NAIA First Round	7
2020–21	2020	Doug Socha	NAIA	—	MSC	9	1	1st (Sun)	5	0	L NAIA Semifinal	4
2021	2021	Doug Socha	NAIA	—	MSC	9	3	1st (Sun)	5	1	L NAIA Quarterfinal	11
2022	2022	Doug Socha	NAIA	—	TSC	9	4	1st	6	0	L NAIA Championship	12
2023	2023	Doug Socha	NAIA	—	TSC	12	2	1st	7	0	W NAIA Championship	3
2024	2024	Myles Russ	NAIA	—	TSC	12	1	1st	6	0	L NAIA Championship	1
2025	2025	Myles Russ	NAIA	—	TSC	12	1	1st	7	0	L NAIA Championship	2
