= Ave Maria Gyrenes =

- University: Ave Maria University
- Association: NAIA
- Conference: The Sun (primary)
- Athletic director: John Weisbrod
- Location: Ave Maria, Florida
- Varsity teams: 24 (12 men's, 12 women's)
- Football stadium: Gyrene Field
- Basketball arena: Tom Golisano Field House
- Baseball stadium: Bowie's Ballpark
- Softball stadium: Ave Maria Softball Field
- Soccer stadium: Gyrene Field
- Aquatics center: Immokalee Sports Complex
- Lacrosse stadium: Gyrene Field
- Tennis venue: AMU Tennis Facility
- Nickname: Gyrenes
- Colors: Blue and green
- Mascot: Jax the Gyrene
- Website: avemariagyrenes.com
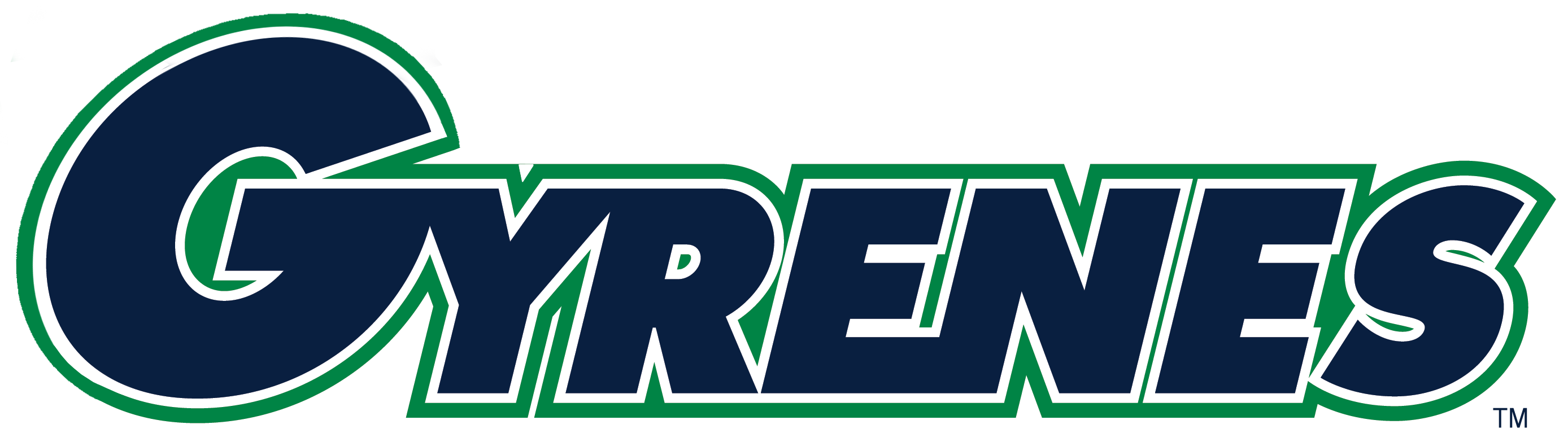

The Ave Maria Gyrenes are the athletic teams that represent Ave Maria University, located in Ave Maria, Florida, in intercollegiate sports as a member of the National Association of Intercollegiate Athletics (NAIA), primarily competing in the Sun Conference (formerly known as the Florida Sun Conference (FSC) until after the 2007–08 school year) since the 2009–10 academic year. They are also a member of the United States Collegiate Athletic Association (USCAA).

Ave Maria's traditional rivals for all sports are St. Thomas University, Keiser University, and Warner University.

== Varsity teams ==
Ave Maria competes in 24 intercollegiate varsity sports:

| Men's sports | Women's sports |
|---|---|
| Baseball | Basketball |
| Basketball | Beach volleyball |
| Cross country | Cross country |
| Football | Golf |
| Golf | Lacrosse |
| Pickleball | Pickleball |
| Rugby | Soccer |
| Soccer | Softball |
| Swimming | Swimming |
| Tennis | Tennis |
| Track and field | Track and field |
| Ultimate frisbee | Volleyball |

== Football ==
In 2011, Ave Maria became the first college in southwestern Florida to field a football team. In the spring of 2016, the Gyrenes football team joined the Mid-South Conference (MSC) as an affiliate member.

=== Rivalries ===
Ave Maria football's traditional rival is fellow Sun Conference member St. Thomas University. The matchup between the two South Florida, Catholic schools is called the Rosary Bowl, which St. Thomas leads all-time with six wins.

Other geographic rivalries exist with Keiser University, with Keiser having a distinct 7-1 lead in the all-time series, and with Warner University, with Ave Maria holding a 7-6 all-time series lead.

=== Series records ===
- Records through January 2, 2026

| Opponent (Rivalry) | Match Ups | Record | Next Game |
|---|---|---|---|
| Warner | 13 | 7-6 | 2026 |
| Keiser | 8 | 1-7 | 2026 |
| St. Thomas (Rosary Bowl) | 7 | 1-6 | 2026 |

== Men's Basketball ==
=== Rivalries ===
Ave Maria's basketball rivals are St. Thomas, Keiser, and Warner.

=== Series records ===
- Records through January 2, 2026

| Opponent (Rivalry) | Match Ups | Record | Next Game |
|---|---|---|---|
| Warner | 35 | 14-21 | January 7, 2026 |
| Keiser | 35 | 7-28 | January 14, 2026 |
| St. Thomas | 34 | 13-21 | January 17, 2026 |

== Lacrosse ==
The women's lacrosse team competed in the National Women's Lacrosse League (NWLL) in their first varsity season in the spring of 2015. Ave Maria does not sponsor men's lacrosse at the varsity level.

=== Rivalries ===
A rivalry exists with the Franciscan Barons exists for Ave Maria lacrosse. The matchup between the two deeply Catholic schools is called the Newman Cup, named for both schools' perennial prominence on the Newman Guide. The last game was played in 2024, with Ave Maria winning 22-6. As of the 2026 season, the Newman Cup is dormant.

=== Series records ===
- Records through January 2, 2026

| Opponent (Rivalry) | Match Ups | Record | Next Game |
|---|---|---|---|
| Franciscan (Newman Cup) | 3 | 3-0 | dormant |
