= Pikeville Bears =

Sports teams of the University of Pikeville in Kentucky

- University: University of Pikeville
- Association: NAIA
- Conference: AAC (primary)
- Athletic director: Corey Fipps
- Location: Pikeville, Kentucky
- Varsity teams: 25 (11 men's, 10 women's, 4 co-ed)
- Football stadium: Hambley Athletic Complex
- Basketball arena: Appalachian Wireless Arena
- Baseball stadium: Johnnie Lemaster Field
- Softball stadium: Paul Butcher Field
- Soccer field: Bob Amos Complex
- Nickname: Bears
- Colors: Orange and black
- Website: upikebears.com

The Pikeville Bears, also the UPike Bears (stylized as "UPIKE"), are the athletic teams that represent the University of Pikeville, located in Pikeville, Kentucky, in intercollegiate sports as a member of the National Association of Intercollegiate Athletics (NAIA), primarily competing in the Appalachian Athletic Conference (AAC) since the 2023–24 academic year. The Bears previously competed in the Kentucky Intercollegiate Athletic Conference (KIAC). They have been known as the River States Conference (RSC) since the 2016–17 school year) from 1958–59 to 1999–2000. More recently, the Bears competed in the Mid-South Conference from 2000–2001 to 2022–2023.

== Conference affiliations ==
NAIA

- Kentucky Intercollegiate Athletic Conference (1958–2000)
- Mid-South Conference (2000–2023)
- Appalachian Athletic Conference (2023–present)

== Varsity teams ==
UPike competes in the following intercollegiate varsity sports:

| Men's sports | Women's sports |
|---|---|
| Baseball | Basketball |
| Basketball | Bowling |
| Bowling | Cross country |
| Cross country | Golf |
| Football | Soccer |
| Golf | Softball |
| Soccer | Swimming |
| Swimming | Tennis |
| Tennis | Track and field |
| Track and field | Volleyball |
| Wrestling | |
Co-ed sports
Archery
Bass fishing
Esports

== Accomplishments ==
Pikeville athletics have won numerous conference championships and three national championships: two in women's bowling in 2004 and 2008 and a NAIA Division I men's basketball championship in 2011.
