= 2022 East Central Tigers football team =

American college football season

2022 East Central Tigers football

Heritage Bowl champion

Heritage Bowl, W 38–21 vs. Texas A&M–Kingsville
- Conference: Great American Conference
- Record: 9–3 (8–3 GAC)
- Head coach: Kris McCullough (1st season)
- Offensive scheme: Hurry-up, no-huddle spread
- Defensive coordinator: John Litrenta (3rd season)
- Base defense: 3–4
- Home stadium: Koi Ishto Stadium

2022 Great American Conference football standings
	Conf.			Overall
Team	W		L	W		L
No. 10 Ouachita Baptist $^	11	–	0	11	–	1
No. 22 Harding	9	–	2	9	–	2
East Central #	8	–	3	9	–	3
Henderson State	8	–	3	8	–	3
SE Oklahoma State #	6	–	5	6	–	6
Arkansas Tech	5	–	6	5	–	6
Southern Arkansas	5	–	6	5	–	6
Southern Nazarene	5	–	6	5	–	6
SW Oklahoma State	4	–	7	4	–	7
Arkansas–Monticello	3	–	8	3	–	8
Oklahoma Baptist	1	–	10	1	–	10
NW Oklahoma State	1	–	10	1	–	10
$ – Conference champion; ^ – NCAA Division II playoff participant; # – bowl participant (East Central: Heritage Bowl, SE Oklahoma State: Live United Texarkana Bowl); Rankings from AFCA poll

The 2022 East Central Tigers football team represented East Central University (ECU) as a member of the Great American Conference (GAC) during the 2022 NCAA Division II football season. Led by Kris McCullough in his first and only season as head coach, the Tigers compiled an overall record of 9–3 with a mark of 8–3 in conference play, tying for third place in the GAC. This was the best finish for East Central sine the 1993 season, when the Tigers went 10–3 and won the NAIA Division I national championship. East Central was invited to the Heritage Bowl, where the Tigers defeated Texas A&M–Kingsville, 38–21. The team played home games at Koi Ishto Stadium in Ada, Oklahoma.

Following the season, McCullough resigned to accept the head coaching job at UT Permian Basin.

== Schedule ==
Date	Time	Opponent	Site	Result	Attendance
September 1	6:30 p.m.	No. 9 Harding	Koi Ishto Stadium; Ada, OK	L 12–29	2,500
September 10	6:00 p.m.	at Arkansas Tech	Buerkle Field; Russellville, AR	L 13–35	4,613
September 17	2:00 p.m.	at Southern Nazarene	SNU Stadium; Bethany, OK	W 44–21	1,500
September 24	6:00 p.m.	Northwestern Oklahoma State	Koi Ishto Stadium; Ada, OK	W 31–3	2,000
October 1	2:30 p.m.	at Southern Arkansas	Wilkins Stadium; Magnolia, AR	W 34–22	4,728
October 8	2:00 p.m.	Henderson State	Koi Ishto Stadium; Ada, OK	W 31–10	1,000
October 15	6:00 p.m.	at Oklahoma Baptist	Crain Family Stadium; Shawnee, OK	W 34–20	3,561
October 22	2:00 p.m.	Southwestern Oklahoma State^{†}	Koi Ishto Stadium; Ada, OK	W 42–28	3,201
October 27	6:00 p.m.	at No. 4 Ouachita Baptist	Cliff Harris Stadium; Arkadelphia, AR	L 18–28	3,128
November 5	2:00 p.m.	Arkansas–Monticello	Koi Ishto Stadium; Ada, OK	W 16–0	1,500
November 12	2:00 p.m.	Southeastern Oklahoma State	Koi Ishto Stadium; Ada, OK	W 31–10	3,000
December 3	12:00 p.m.	vs. Texas A&M–Kingsville*	Tiger Stadium; Corsicana, TX (Heritage Bowl)	W 38–21	2,000
*Non-conference game; ^{†}Homecoming; Rankings from AFCA Poll released prior to the game; All times are in Central time

== Preseason ==
=== Coaching changes ===
On March 12, 2022, head coach Al Johnson was hired to be Wisconsin's running backs coach, with offensive coordinator Kris McCullough being named the Tigers' interim head coach. McCullough was 26 at the time, making him the youngest head coach in all of college football. The interim tag was removed mid-season, with McCullough being hired as the full-time head coach on October 27.

=== GAC coaches poll ===
The GAC coaches preseason poll was released on August 2, 2022. The Tigers were predicted to finish sixth in the conference.

== Game summaries ==
=== No. 9 Harding ===
No. 9 Harding Bisons at East Central Tigers – Game summary

Quarter	1	2	3	4	Total
No. 9 Bisons	7	7	7	8	29
Tigers	0	9	3	0	12

at Koi Ishto Stadium, Ada, Oklahoma

- Date: September 1
- Game time: 6:30 p.m. CDT
- Game weather: Cloudy, 76 °F (24 °C)
- Game attendance: 2,500
- Referee: Tommy Little
- Box score, Recap

Game information
First quarter
- HAR – Zach Smith 32-yard pass from Keylon Cole (Grant Ennis kick), 7:31. Bisons 7–0. Drive: 6 plays, 52 yards, 3:42.

Second quarter

- ECU – Alexis Lopez 27-yard field goal, 11:21. Bisons 7–3. Drive: 7 plays, 34 yards, 3:25.
- HAR – Kage Citty 56-yard pass from Keylon Cole (Grant Ennis kick), 10:06. Bisons 14–3. Drive: 3 plays, 75 yards, 1:15.
- ECU – La'Quan Wells 3-yard pass from Kenny Hrncir (kick blocked), 0:15. Bisons 14–9. Drive: 6 plays, 35 yards, 0:52.

Third quarter

- HAR – Kage Citty 33-yard pass from Keylon Cole (Grant Ennis kick), 9:52. Bisons 21–9. Drive: 10 plays, 77 yards, 5:02.
- ECU – Alexis Lopez 36-yard field goal, 2:59. Bisons 21–12. Drive: 14 plays, 53 yards, 6:47.

Fourth quarter

- HAR – Cole Keylon 1-yard run (A. J. Brown run), 6:36. Bisons 29–12. Drive: 7 plays, 26 yards, 3:44.

Statistics	HAR	ECU
First downs	15	11
Total yards	340	161
Rushing yards	219	14
Passing yards	121	147
Turnovers	3	0
Time of possession	33:54	24:23

Team	Category	Player	Statistics
Harding	Passing	Cole Keylon	3/6, 121 yards, 3 TD
Harding	Rushing	Will Fitzhugh	14 rushes, 49 yards
Harding	Receiving	Kage Citty	2 receptions, 89 yards, 2 TD
East Central	Passing	Kenny Hrncir	20/33, 147 yards, TD
East Central	Rushing	Miles Davis	8 rushes, 14 yards
East Central	Receiving	Jayquan Lincoln	6 receptions, 33 yards

=== At Arkansas Tech ===
East Central Tigers at Arkansas Tech Wonder Boys – Game summary

Quarter	1	2	3	4	Total
Tigers	0	3	3	7	13
Wonder Boys	0	14	7	14	35

at Buerkle Field, Russellville, Arkansas

- Date: September 10
- Game time: 6:00 p.m. CDT
- Game weather: Cloudy, 84 °F (29 °C)
- Game attendance: 4,613
- Referee: Michael Catton
- Box score, Recap

Game information
First quarter
- No scoring plays

Second quarter

- ECU – Alexis Lopez 35-yard field goal, 14:11. Tigers 3–0. Drive: 10 plays, 25 yards, 4:52.
- ATU – Jordan Edington 15-yard pass from Taye Gatewood (Jesus Zizumbo kick), 10:23. Wonder Boys 7–3. Drive: 10 plays, 75 yards, 3:48.
- ATU – Travis Tobey 30-yard pass from Taye Gatewood (Jesus Zizumbo kick), 0:10. Wonder Boys 14–3. Drive: 1 play, 30 yards, 0:06.

Third quarter

- ECU – Alexis Lopez 37-yard field goal, 10:47. Wonder Boys 14–6. Drive: 7 plays, 42 yards, 3:09.
- ATU – Taye Gatewood 5-yard run (Jesus Zizumbo kick), 6:14. Wonder Boys 21–6. Drive: 5 plays, 23 yards, 2:17.

Fourth quarter

- ATU – Deon Simmons 16-yard run (Jesus Zizumbo kick), 13:27. Wonder Boys 28–6. Drive: 9 plays, 88 yards, 4:29.
- ATU – Matthew Rivera 19-yard pass from Taye Gatewood (Jesus Zizumbo kick), 10:25. Wonder Boys 35–6. Drive: 6 plays, 79 yards, 2:07.
- ECU – Kenny Hrncir 1-yard run (Alexis Lopez kick), 5:30. Wonder Boys 35–13. Drive: 13 plays, 82 yards, 4:48.

Statistics	ECU	ATU
First downs	23	19
Total yards	333	322
Rushing yards	124	165
Passing yards	209	157
Turnovers	3	2
Time of possession	35:47	24:13

Team	Category	Player	Statistics
East Central	Passing	Kenny Hrncir	19/42, 209 yards, 2 INT
East Central	Rushing	Nemier Herod	13 rushes, 61 yards
East Central	Receiving	Greg Howell	3 receptions, 54 yards
Arkansas Tech	Passing	Taye Gatewood	13/23, 157 yards, 3 TD
Arkansas Tech	Rushing	Devontae Dean	10 rushes, 58 yards
Arkansas Tech	Receiving	Matthew Rivera	4 receptions, 39 yards, TD

=== At Southern Nazarene ===
East Central Tigers at Southern Nazarene Crimson Storm – Game summary

Quarter	1	2	3	4	Total
Tigers	14	14	7	9	44
Crimson Storm	7	7	0	7	21

at SNU Stadium, Bethany, Oklahoma

- Date: September 17
- Game time: 2:00 p.m. CDT
- Game weather: Sunny, 93 °F (34 °C)
- Game attendance: 1,500
- Referee: Michael Catton
- Box score, Recap

Game information
First quarter
- ECU – La'Quan Wells 19-yard pass from Kenny Hrncir (Alexis Lopez kick), 12:19. Tigers 7–0. Drive: 6 plays, 75 yards, 2:41.
- ECU – Miles Davis 22-yard run (Alexis Lopez kick), 2:08. Tigers 14–0. Drive: 12 plays, 57 yards, 5:32.
- SNU – Asa Robertson 70-yard pass from Gage Porter (Ryan Reid kick), 1:49. Tigers 14–7. Drive: 1 play, 70 yards, 0:13.

Second quarter

- ECU – Nemier Herod 1-yard run (Alexis Lopez kick), 13:46. Tigers 21–7. Drive: 8 plays, 75 yards, 3:03.
- SNU – Angel Ramirez 3-yard run (Ryan Reid kick), 0:45. Tigers 21–14. Drive: 7 plays, 54 yards, 2:05.
- ECU – La'Quan Wells 8-yard pass from Kenny Hrncir (Alexis Lopez kick), 0:03. Tigers 28–14. Drive: 5 plays, 66 yards, 0:37.

Third quarter

- ECU – Kenny Hrncir 4-yard pass from Kenny Hrncir (Alexis Lopez kick), 1:44. Tigers 35–14. Drive: 11 plays, 92 yards, 4:53.

Fourth quarter

- SNU – Kolbe Branch 7-yard pass from Gage Porter (Ryan Reid kick), 8:37. Tigers 35–21. Drive: 17 plays, 78 yards, 7:59.
- ECU – Nemier Herod 4-yard run (kick failed), 5:21. Tigers 41–21. Drive: 6 plays, 70 yards, 3:09.
- ECU – Oscar Simon 46-yard field goal, 0:04. Tigers 44–21. Drive: 4 plays, 8 yards, 2:26.

Statistics	ECU	SNU
First downs	23	19
Total yards	471	416
Rushing yards	198	256
Passing yards	273	160
Turnovers	0	3
Time of possession	28:04	31:56

Team	Category	Player	Statistics
East Central	Passing	Kenny Hrncir	18/27, 217 yards, 3 TD
East Central	Rushing	Nemier Herod	14 rushes, 80 yards, 2 TD
East Central	Receiving	La'Quan Wells	5 receptions, 117 yards, 2 TD
Southern Nazarene	Passing	Gage Porter	10/17, 155 yards, 2 TD
Southern Nazarene	Rushing	Gage Porter	21 rushes, 150 yards
Southern Nazarene	Receiving	Asa Robertson	3 receptions, 95 yards, TD

=== Northwestern Oklahoma State ===
Northwestern Oklahoma State Rangers at East Central Tigers – Game summary

Quarter	1	2	3	4	Total
Rangers	0	0	3	0	3
Tigers	3	7	7	14	31

at Koi Ishto Stadium, Ada, Oklahoma

- Date: September 24
- Game time: 6:00 p.m. CDT
- Game weather: Sunny, 92 °F (33 °C)
- Game attendance: 2,000
- Referee: Kody Stephenson
- Box score, Recap

Game information
First quarter
- ECU – Alexis Lopez 35-yard field goal, 7:35. Tigers 3–0. Drive: 13 plays, 63 yards, 7:16.

Second quarter

- WCU – Nemier Herod 1-yard run (Alexis Lopez kick), 0:48. Tigers 10–0. Drive: 6 plays, 56 yards, 2:17.

Third quarter

- NWO – Connor O'Neal 32-yard field goal, 11:25. Tigers 10–3. Drive: 10 plays, 53 yards, 3:35.
- ECU – Jayquan Lincoln 3-yard pass from Kenny Hrncir (Alexis Lopez kick), 5:46. Tigers 17–3. Drive: 5 plays, 52 yards, 1:53.

Fourth quarter

- ECU – Kenny Hrncir 6-yard run (Alexis Lopez kick), 14:55. Tigers 24–3. Drive: 8 plays, 89 yards, 3:37.
- ECU – Jawan King 5-yard pass from Kenny Hrncir (Alexis Lopez kick), 5:47. Tigers 31–3. Drive: 9 plays, 89 yards, 5:08.

Statistics	NWO	ECU
First downs	16	23
Total yards	254	452
Rushing yards	61	215
Passing yards	193	237
Turnovers	2	1
Time of possession	26:20	33:40

Team	Category	Player	Statistics
NW Oklahoma State	Passing	Tanner Clarkson	21/35, 193 yards, INT
NW Oklahoma State	Rushing	Tanner Clarkson	11 rushes, 27 yards
NW Oklahoma State	Receiving	Darian Gill	1 reception, 57 yards
East Central	Passing	Kenny Hrncir	22/27, 237 yards, 2 TD
East Central	Rushing	Nemier Herod	23 rushes, 193 yards, TD
East Central	Receiving	La'Quan Wells	8 receptions, 88 yards

=== At Southern Arkansas ===
East Central Tigers at Southern Arkansas Muleriders – Game summary

Quarter	1	2	3	4	Total
Tigers	7	13	14	0	34
Muleriders	6	10	6	0	22

at Wilkins Stadium, Magnolia, Arkansas

- Date: October 1
- Game time: 2:30 p.m. CDT
- Game weather: Sunny
- Game attendance: 4,728
- Referee: Dan Wilson
- Box score, Recap

Game information
First quarter
- SAU – Jariq Scales 13-yard run (kick failed), 5:47. Muleriders 6–0. Drive: 9 plays, 80 yards, 2:52.
- ECU – Nemier Herod 2-yard run (Alexis Lopez kick), 1:58. Tigers 7–6. Drive: 9 plays, 79 yards, 3:42.

Second quarter

- ECU – Kenny Hrncir 17-yard run (pass failed), 11:31. Tigers 13–6. Drive: 6 plays, 52 yards, 2:57.
- SAU – Jonathan Lewis 9-yard run (Austin Wilkerson kick), 5:20. Tied 13–13. Drive: 12 plays, 94 yards, 4:18.
- ECU – La'Quan Wells 27-yard pass from Kenny Hrncir (Alexis Lopez kick), 0:37. Tigers 20–13. Drive: 2 plays, 73 yards, 0:24.
- SAU – Austin Wilkerson 45-yard field goal, 0:00. Tigers 20–16. Drive: 6 plays, 27 yards, 0:37.

Third quarter

- ECU – La'Quan Wells 69-yard pass from Kenny Hrncir (Alexis Lopez kick), 7:58. Tigers 27–16. Drive: 4 plays, 80 yards, 1:46.
- SAU – Jariq Scales 60-yard run (pass failed), 7:14. Tigers 27–22. Drive: 2 plays, 64 yards, 0:36.
- ECU – Jackson Allen 5-yard pass from Kenny Hrncir (Alexis Lopez kick), 3:50. Tigers 34–22. Drive: 8 plays, 67 yards, 3:18.

Fourth quarter

- No scoring plays

Statistics	ECU	SAU
First downs	24	23
Total yards	523	484
Rushing yards	214	326
Passing yards	309	158
Turnovers	1	3
Time of possession	33:57	26:03

Team	Category	Player	Statistics
East Central	Passing	Kenny Hrncir	21/30, 309 yards, 3 TD, INT
East Central	Rushing	Nemier Herod	25 rushes, 123 yards, TD
East Central	Receiving	La'Quan Wells	4 receptions, 107 yards, 2 TD
Southern Arkansas	Passing	Judd Barton	10/22, 100 yards
Southern Arkansas	Rushing	Jariq Scales	22 rushes, 173 yards, 2 TD
Southern Arkansas	Receiving	Cole Williams	3 receptions, 59 yards

=== Henderson State ===
Henderson State Reddies at East Central Tigers – Game summary

Quarter	1	2	3	4	Total
Reddies	0	7	3	0	10
Tigers	3	11	0	17	31

at Koi Ishto Stadium, Ada, Oklahoma

- Date: October 8
- Game time: 2:00 p.m. CDT
- Game weather: Sunny, 55 °F (13 °C)
- Game attendance: 1,000
- Referee: Ken Roan
- Box score, Recap

Game information
First quarter
- ECU – Alexis Lopez 47-yard field goal, 13:11. Tigers 3–0. Drive: 4 plays, 0 yards, 0:00.

Second quarter

- ECU – Alexis Lopez 26-yard field goal, 13:09. Tigers 6–0. Drive: 19 plays, 62 yards, 9:08.
- HSU – Xavier Malone 5-yard pass from Landon Ledbetter (Triston Heaton kick), 0:41. Reddies 7–6. Drive: 10 plays, 79 yards, 6:34.
- ECU – Josh Little 20-yard pass from Kenny Hrncir (Kenny Hrncir pass to La'Quan Wells), 0:17. Tigers 14–7. Drive: 4 plays, 75 yards, 0:22.

Third quarter

- HSU – Triston Heaton 34-yard field goal, 2:08. Tigers 14–10. Drive: 12 plays, 43 yards, 7:55.

Fourth quarter

- ECU – Jake Berry 10-yard pass from Kenny Hrncir (Alexis Lopez kick), 14:56. Tigers 21–10. Drive: 4 plays, 81 yards, 2:04.
- ECU – Josh Little 26-yard pass from Kenny Hrncir (Alexis Lopez kick), 7:38. Tigers 28–10. Drive: 8 plays, 80 yards, 4:07.
- ECU – Alexis Lopez 21-yard field goal, 3:21. Tigers 31–10. Drive: 7 plays, 26 yards, 4:07.

Statistics	HSU	ECU
First downs	20	23
Total yards	342	398
Rushing yards	150	102
Passing yards	192	296
Turnovers	4	0
Time of possession	25:01	34:59

Team	Category	Player	Statistics
Henderson State	Passing	Landon Ledbetter	14/22, 184 yards, TD, INT
Henderson State	Rushing	Korien Burrell	13 rushes, 60 yards
Henderson State	Receiving	Xavier Malone	7 receptions, 96 yards, TD
East Central	Passing	Kenny Hrncir	20/36, 296 yards, 3 TD
East Central	Rushing	Nemier Herod	19 rushes, 84 yards
East Central	Receiving	Greg Howell	3 receptions, 70 yards

=== At Oklahoma Baptist ===
East Central Tigers at Oklahoma Baptist Bison – Game summary

Quarter	1	2	3	4	Total
Tigers	7	17	7	3	34
Bison	0	7	6	7	20

at Crain Family Stadium, Shawnee, Oklahoma

- Date: October 15
- Game time: 6:00 p.m. CDT
- Game weather: Sunny, 90 °F (32 °C)
- Game attendance: 3,561
- Referee: DeWayne Barbee
- Box score, Recap

Game information
First quarter
- ECU – Jawan King 1-yard run (Alexis Lopez kick), 9:49. Tigers 7–0. Drive: 9 plays, 75 yards, 5:11.

Second quarter

- ECU – Jayquan Lincoln 15-yard pass from Kenny Hrncir (Alexis Lopez kick), 11:58. Tigers 14–0. Drive: 10 plays, 94 yards, 5:40.
- ECU – Alexis Lopez 44-yard field goal, 4:31. Tigers 17–0. Drive: 11 plays, 38 yards, 5:04.
- ECU – Nemier Herod 1-yard run (Alexis Lopez kick), 3:44. Tigers 24–0. Drive: 2 plays, 3 yards, 0:26.
- OKB – Michael Marshall 2-yard pass from Dayton Wolfe (Guillermo Garcia Rodriguez kick), 0:38. Tigers 24–7. Drive: 11 plays, 69 yards, 2:58.

Third quarter

- OKB – Buddy Bizzell 2-yard run (kick blocked), 12:32. Tigers 24–13. Drive: 7 plays, 60 yards, 2:23.
- ECU – Jackson Allen 16-yard pass from Kenny Hrncir (Alexis Lopez kick), 6:46. Tigers 31–13. Drive: 3 plays, 34 yards, 1:10.

Fourth quarter

- ECU – Alexis Lopez 27-yard field goal, 11:26. Tigers 34–13. Drive: 9 plays, 73 yards, 3:48.
- OKB – Keilahn Harris 29-yard pass from Dayton Wolfe (Guillermo Garcia Rodriguez kick), 7:35. Tigers 34–20. Drive: 9 plays, 75 yards, 3:51.

Statistics	ECU	OKB
First downs	28	20
Total yards	467	315
Rushing yards	213	68
Passing yards	254	247
Turnovers	0	3
Time of possession	38:22	21:38

Team	Category	Player	Statistics
East Central	Passing	Kenny Hrncir	21/34, 254 yards, 2 TD
East Central	Rushing	Nemier Herod	21 rushes, 121 yards, TD
East Central	Receiving	Jayquan Lincoln	3 receptions, 60 yards, TD
Oklahoma Baptist	Passing	Dayton Wolfe	26/40, 247 yards, 2 TD, 2 INT
Oklahoma Baptist	Rushing	Nate Anderson	4 rushes, 27 yards
Oklahoma Baptist	Receiving	Keilahn Harris	9 receptions, 95 yards, TD

=== Southwestern Oklahoma State ===
Southwestern Oklahoma State Bulldogs at East Central Tigers – Game summary

Quarter	1	2	3	4	Total
Bulldogs	7	7	7	7	28
Tigers	7	21	14	0	42

at Koi Ishto Stadium, Ada, Oklahoma

- Date: October 22
- Game time: 2:00 p.m. CDT
- Game weather: Sunny
- Game attendance: 3,201
- Referee: Jeremy Goodrich
- Box score, Recap

Game information
First quarter
- ECU – Nemier Herod 66-yard run (Alexis Lopez kick), 14:19. Tigers 7–0. Drive: 3 plays, 75 yards, 0:41.
- SWO – Gerald Palmer 3-yard run (Jaren Van Winkle kick), 6:38. Tied 7–7. Drive: 10 plays, 55 yards, 3:05.

Second quarter

- ECU – La'Quan Wells 40-yard run (Alexis Lopez kick), 14:51. Tigers 14–7. Drive: 11 plays, 82 yards, 6:42.
- SWO – Dexter Brown 2-yard pass from Tylan Morton (Jaren Van Winkle kick), 8:12. Tied 14–14. Drive: 16 plays, 81 yards, 6:33.
- ECU – Greg Howell 42-yard pass from Kenny Hrncir (Alexis Lopez kick), 7:02. Tigers 21–14. Drive: 3 plays, 67 yards, 1:04.
- ECU – Nemier Herod 2-yard run (Alexis Lopez kick), 0:25. Tigers 28–14. Drive: 8 plays, 32 yards, 3:17.

Third quarter

- ECU – Jayquan Lincoln 88-yard pass from Kenny Hrncir (Alexis Lopez kick), 10:20. Tigers 35–14. Drive: 1 play, 88 yards, 0:12.
- ECU – Walter Brooks 12-yard pass from Kenny Hrncir (Alexis Lopez kick), 6:17. Tigers 42–14. Drive: 7 plays, 53 yards, 3:24.
- SWO – Dexter Brown 29-yard run (Jaren Van Winkle kick), 0:00. Tigers 42–21. Drive: 3 plays, 50 yards, 0:57.

Fourth quarter

- SWO – Tylan Morton 15-yard run (Jaren Van Winkle kick), 5:32. Tigers 42–28. Drive: 6 plays, 87 yards, 1:40.

Statistics	SWO	ECU
First downs	23	22
Total yards	346	458
Rushing yards	242	219
Passing yards	104	239
Turnovers	0	0
Time of possession	26:26	33:34

Team	Category	Player	Statistics
SW Oklahoma State	Passing	Tylan Morton	14/30, 104 yards, TD
SW Oklahoma State	Rushing	Dexter Brown	13 rushes, 93 yards, TD
SW Oklahoma State	Receiving	Jalen Lampley	4 receptions, 35 yards
East Central	Passing	Kenny Hrncir	16/25, 239 yards, 3 TD
East Central	Rushing	Nemier Herod	22 rushes, 151 yards, 2 TD
East Central	Receiving	Jayquan Lincoln	3 receptions, 99 yards, TD

=== At No. 4 Ouachita Baptist ===
East Central Tigers at No. 4 Ouachita Baptist Tigers – Game summary

Quarter	1	2	3	4	Total
East Central	0	6	6	6	18
No. 4 Ouachita Baptist	7	7	0	14	28

at Cliff Harris Stadium, Arkadelphia, Arkansas

- Date: October 27
- Game time: 6:00 p.m. CDT
- Game weather: Cloudy, 66 °F (19 °C)
- Game attendance: 3,128
- Referee: Michael Catton
- Box score, Recap

Game information
First quarter
- OUA – T. J. Cole 20-yard run (Dax Jaggers kick), 7:01. Ouachita Baptist 7–0. Drive: 3 plays, 78 yards, 1:12.

Second quarter

- ECU – Alexis Lopez 49-yard field goal, 13:15. Ouachita Baptist 7–3. Drive: 10 plays, 43 yards, 3:56.
- ECU – Alexis Lopez 45-yard field goal, 3:34. Ouachita Baptist 7–6. Drive: 14 plays, 63 yards, 6:07.
- OUA – Riley Harms 8-yard run (Dax Jaggers kick), 0:55. Ouachita Baptist 14–6. Drive: 9 plays, 75 yards, 2:39.

Third quarter

- ECU – Nemier Herod 2-yard run (pass failed), 7:49. Ouachita Baptist 14–12. Drive: 14 plays, 75 yards, 7:11.

Fourth quarter

- ECU – Miles Davis 1-yard run (run failed), 6:50. East Central 18–14. Drive: 12 plays, 62 yards, 6:27.
- OUA – T. J. Cole 8-yard run (Dax Jaggers kick), 1:56. Ouachita Baptist 21–18. Drive: 6 plays, 27 yards, 3:12.
- OUA – T. J. Cole 3-yard run (Dax Jaggers kick), 1:33. Ouachita Baptist 28–18. Drive: 1 play, 3 yards, 0:04.

Statistics	ECU	OUA
First downs	25	13
Total yards	400	348
Rushing yards	163	147
Passing yards	237	201
Turnovers	2	1
Time of possession	36:26	23:34

Team	Category	Player	Statistics
East Central	Passing	Kenny Hrncir	20/40, 237 yards, 2 INT
East Central	Rushing	Kenny Hrncir	14 rushes, 73 yards
East Central	Receiving	Jayquan Lincoln	4 receptions, 62 yards
Ouachita Baptist	Passing	Riley Harms	10/19, 201 yards
Ouachita Baptist	Rushing	T. J. Cole	22 rushes, 103 yards, 3 TD
Ouachita Baptist	Receiving	Connor Flannigan	5 receptions, 81 yards

=== Arkansas–Monticello ===
Arkansas–Monticello Boll Weevils at East Central Tigers – Game summary

Quarter	1	2	3	4	Total
Boll Weevils	0	0	0	0	0
Tigers	0	6	3	7	16

at Koi Ishto Stadium, Ada, Oklahoma

- Date: November 5
- Game time: 2:00 p.m. CDT
- Game weather: Sunny, 60 °F (16 °C)
- Game attendance: 1,500
- Referee: Darrell Robertson
- Box score, Recap

Game information
First quarter
- No scoring plays

Second quarter

- ECU – Alexis Lopez 34-yard field goal, 3:03. Tigers 3–0. Drive: 9 plays, 51 yards, 5:49.
- ECU – Alexis Lopez 35-yard field goal, 0:00. Tigers 6–0. Drive: 12 plays, 44 yards, 2:02.

Third quarter

- ECU – Alexis Lopez 53-yard field goal, 10:50. Tigers 9–0. Drive: 4 plays, 5 yards, 1:54.

Fourth quarter

- ECU – Jawan King 15-yard run (Alexis Lopez kick), 7:07. Tigers 16–0. Drive: 14 plays, 80 yards, 7:53.

Statistics	UAM	ECU
First downs	10	18
Total yards	164	272
Rushing yards	105	172
Passing yards	59	100
Turnovers	2	2
Time of possession	24:45	35:15

Team	Category	Player	Statistics
Arkansas–Monticello	Passing	Edwin Kleinpeter	11/25, 59 yards, 2 INT
Arkansas–Monticello	Rushing	Gary Ferman	9 rushes, 42 yards
Arkansas–Monticello	Receiving	Caleb Jacobs	3 receptions, 16 yards
East Central	Passing	Kenny Hrncir	15/23, 100 yards, 2 INT
East Central	Rushing	Miles Davis	14 rushes, 88 yards
East Central	Receiving	Greg Howell	2 receptions, 29 yards

=== Southeastern Oklahoma State ===
Southeastern Oklahoma State Savage Storm at East Central Tigers – Game summary

Quarter	1	2	3	4	Total
Savage Storm	0	7	3	0	10
Tigers	7	7	0	17	31

at Koi Ishto Stadium, Ada, Oklahoma

- Date: November 12
- Game time: 2:00 p.m. CST
- Game weather: Sunny, 48 °F (9 °C)
- Game attendance: 3,000
- Referee: Tommy Little
- Box score, Recap

Game information
First quarter
- ECU – Jayquan Lincoln 14-yard pass from Kenny Hrncir (Alexis Lopez kick), 2:52. Tigers 7–0. Drive: 5 plays, 69 yards, 2:51.

Second quarter

- SEO – Marquis Gray 2-yard pass from Daulton Hatley (Trey Keatts kick), 14:28. Tied 7–7. Drive: 8 plays, 59 yards, 3:14.
- ECU – Nemier Herod 3-yard run (Alexis Lopez kick), 8:04. Tigers 14–7. Drive: 7 plays, 22 yards, 3:16.

Third quarter

- SEO – Trey Keatts 28-yard field goal, 7:45. Tigers 14–10. Drive: 13 plays, 61 yards, 7:09.

Fourth quarter

- ECU – Kenny Hrncir 5-yard run (Alexis Lopez kick), 10:00. Tigers 21–10. Drive: 11 plays, 83 yards, 5:03.
- ECU – Jalen Baldwin 29-yard interception return (Alexis Lopez kick), 8:47. Tigers 28–10.
- ECU – Alexis Lopez 38-yard field goal, 3:06. Tigers 31–10. Drive: 6 plays, 21 yards, 0:58.

Statistics	SEO	ECU
First downs	14	16
Total yards	216	257
Rushing yards	109	93
Passing yards	107	164
Turnovers	5	0
Time of possession	30:29	29:31

Team	Category	Player	Statistics
SE Oklahoma State	Passing	Daulton Hatley	14/29, 107 yards, TD, 2 INT
SE Oklahoma State	Rushing	Ryan Hirt	18 rushes, 105 yards
SE Oklahoma State	Receiving	Braxton Kincade	3 receptions, 52 yards
East Central	Passing	Kenny Hrncir	12/23, 164 yards, TD
East Central	Rushing	Miles Davis	11 rushes, 48 yards
East Central	Receiving	Jayquan Lincoln	4 receptions, 66 yards, TD

=== Vs. Texas A&M–Kingsville (Heritage Bowl) ===
East Central Tigers vs. Texas A&M–Kingsville Javelinas (Heritage Bowl) – Game summary

Quarter	1	2	3	4	Total
Tigers	17	7	14	0	38
Javelinas	0	7	0	14	21

at Tiger Stadium, Corsicana, Texas

- Date: December 3
- Game time: 12:00 p.m. CST
- Game weather: Sunny, 51 °F (11 °C)
- Game attendance: 2,000
- Referee: Andy Dunklin

Game information
First quarter
- ECU – Miles Davis 14-yard run (Alexis Lopez kick), 13:17. Tigers 7–0. Drive: 1 play, 14 yards, 0:06.
- ECU – Miles Davis 36-yard run (Alexis Lopez kick), 6:04. Tigers 14–0. Drive: 1 play, 36 yards, 0:08.
- ECU – Alexis Lopez 25-yard field goal, 1:43. Tigers 17–0. Drive: 9 plays, 30 yards, 3:19.

Second quarter

- AMK – Craig Clemons 14-yard pass from Jacob Cavazos (Gilbert Garza kick), 8:37. Tigers 17–7. Drive: 7 plays, 41 yards, 2:23.
- ECU – Nemier Herod 1-yard run (Alexis Lopez kick), 0:56. Tigers 24–7. Drive: 13 plays, 75 yards, 7:41.

Third quarter

- ECU – Miles Davis 5-yard run (Alexis Lopez kick), 8:54. Tigers 31–7. Drive: 11 plays, 75 yards, 6:06.
- ECU – Jake Berry 23-yard pass from Kenny Hrncir (Alexis Lopez kick), 6:49. Tigers 38–7. Drive: 3 plays, 74 yards, 1:16.

Fourth quarter

- AMK – Christian Anderson 2-yard run (Gilbert Garza kick), 8:33. Tigers 38–14. Drive: 8 plays, 57 yards, 2:36.
- AMK – Craig Clemons 24-yard pass from Jacob Cavazos (Gilbert Garza kick), 2:07. Tigers 38–21. Drive: 11 plays, 78 yards, 3:58.

Statistics	ECU	AMK
First downs	17	14
Total yards	355	255
Rushing yards	208	64
Passing yards	147	191
Turnovers	0	1
Time of possession	35:17	24:43

Team	Category	Player	Statistics
East Central	Passing	Kenny Hrncir	8/14, 147 yards, TD
East Central	Rushing	Miles Davis	23 rushes, 127 yards, 3 TD
East Central	Receiving	La'Quan Wells	2 receptions, 51 yards
Texas A&M–Kingsville	Passing	Jacob Cavazos	14/31, 191 yards, 2 TD, INT
Texas A&M–Kingsville	Rushing	Christian Anderson	14 rushes, 31 yards, TD
Texas A&M–Kingsville	Receiving	Craig Clemons	5 receptions, 86 yards, 2 TD

== Roster ==
2022 East Central Tigers football team roster
Players
Coaches
Offense

Pos.	#	Name	Class
WR	1	JayQuan Lincoln	Sr
RB	2	Miles Davis	Jr
WR	4	George Howell	Sr
QB	5	Kameron Williams	So
RB	6	Nemier Herod	So
WR	7	Jackson McFarlane	Sr
QB	8	Kenny Hrncir	Jr
WR	10	La'Quan Wells	So
WR	13	Walter Brooks	Sr
WR	18	Isaiah Willhoite	Jr
QB	19	Brock Dalton	Fr
WR	23	Jake Berrey	So
RB	25	Jawan King	Jr
RB	34	Joey Shaw	Fr
TE	35	Jaren Hendricks	Fr
OL	57	Ben Martin	Fr
OL	58	Tristin Willis	Jr
OL	60	Amire Rogers	Sr
OL	61	Bradley Gregory	Fr
OL	62	Ty Dodd	Fr
OL	63	Tyson Johnson	Fr
OL	65	Dennis Lafferty III	Fr
OL	66	Nathanyl Caballero	Jr
OL	68	Joshua Rodriguez	So
OL	69	Hayden Miller	So
OL	70	Jaeden Poahway	Fr
OL	71	Jack Ramsey	So
OL	73	Riley Tatum	Fr
OL	74	James Castillo	Jr
OL	75	Jaden Turner	Fr
OL	76	Ashton McGraw	So
OL	77	Isiah Tatum	So
OL	78	Anthony Wright	Jr
OL	79	Colby Thomas	So
WR	80	Kylin Mathis	Fr
WR	81	Tyler Blanchard	Fr
WR	82	Jace Wyatt	Fr
TE	85	Jordan Jacobs	Sr
WR	86	Ryan Franklin	Jr
TE	87	Jackson Allen	Jr
WR	88	Josh Little	Fr
TE	89	Tahliq Jackson	So
WR		Jeremiah Barnes	Fr
WR		Andre Cheadle	Fr
WR		Karran Evans	So
RB		Brandon Faulkner Jr.	Fr
WR		Trenton Finley	Jr
TE		Eli Jackson	Fr
WR		Aijon Jones	Fr
RB		Jamalrian Jones	Jr
WR		Jamarlin Jones	Fr
WR		Kaden Jones	Fr
RB		Trinton Kuehn	Fr
TE		Jacob Martin	Fr
WR		DeArmond Matthews	Fr
WR		Kolton McGaha	Fr
WR		Benjamin McKinney	Fr
RB		Kenyon Randall	Fr
TE		Jacob Russell	Fr
RB		Kahlan Sam	Fr
WR		Rayshawn Sanders	So
WR		Jacobia Thomas	Fr
RB		Jarrett Whitefield	Fr
WR		Brett Williams	Fr
QB		Karsen Williams	Fr

Defense

Pos.	#	Name	Class
S	0	Cameron Jones	Sr
CB	1	Jalen Baldwin	Sr
OLB	2	Michael Onwuzurike	So
DB	9	Jimmy Pitts	Jr
OLB	11	Damas Green	Jr
ILB	12	Ameer Muhammad	So
DB	14	Keveon Davis	Jr
DB	15	Keonte Lusk	Jr
CB	16	Taoheed Karim	Sr
ILB	17	Devon Roush	Jr
DB	20	Cody Alexander	GS
ILB	21	Kaleb Graham	Fr
DB	22	Cam Pair	So
ILB	24	Orlando Brown	Sr
ILB	26	Molinsky Desire	So
DB	27	D. J. McConnell	Sr
DB	28	Donovan Callis	Jr
DB	29	Martinez Hill	Jr
DB	30	Elijah Thibodeaux	So
DB	31	Jeffrey Banks	Fr
S	32	Marques Williams	Sr
ILB	33	Ke'Von Curry	So
DB	37	Tavare Smith Jr.	Fr
DB	38	Davion Hodge	So
S	39	Motavious Harris	Jr
OLB	40	Kobey Geter	So
LB	43	B. J. Eashmond	Fr
DB	44	Matthew Tousant	Fr
LB	45	Deryous Stokes	Fr
LB	47	Benecio Porras	Fr
LB	48	Anthony Correia	Sr
LB	50	Lane Johnson	Fr
LB	52	Maximus Johnson	Jr
DL	54	Charmer Cobb	Sr
DL	59	Jalen Reynolds	Sr
DL	90	De'Undre Potts	So
DL	92	Seth Aguilera	Fr
DL	93	Oladotun Olanipekun	Fr
DL	94	Dylan Howell	Fr
DE	95	Jamari Johnson	Sr
DL	97	Yemi Oyesanaya	So
OLB	98	Kailon Golston	Fr
DL	99	Malik Augustine	Sr
DB		Lajuan Brown	Fr
LB		T'kovian Burnley	Fr
DB		Kevin Courtney	Fr
DB		Derrick Culpepper	Fr
LB		Ben Farrell	Fr
LB		Jadahian Floyd-Wright	Fr
DB		Bolton Hawkins	Fr
LB		Jaden Hilliard	Fr
LB		Ray Holman	Fr
ILB		William Hood	Fr
DT		Preston Lewis	Fr
DB		Terry Lewis II	Fr
LB		Austin Linn	Fr
DB		Corey Metscher	Fr
DB		Xavier Miranda	Fr
LB		Caden Pickens	Fr
LB		Caden Ross	Fr
LB		Donovan Rowell	Fr
DL		Seeker Samara	Jr
DL		Quinton Sheppard	Fr
DL		Seth Spady	Fr
LB		Brian Stocker	Fr

Special teams

Pos.	#	Name	Class
K, P	41	Alexis Lopez	Jr
K	51	Oscar Simon	Jr
LS	55	Johnathan Housley	Sr
P	56	Reece Conner	Fr
LS		Jackson Johnson	Fr

Head coach

- Kris McCullough
  Head coach/offensive coordinator

Coordinators/assistant coaches

- John Litrenta
  Assistant head coach/Defensive coordinator/Outside linebackers
- Jacob Maxwell
  Run game coordinator/Offensive line
- Jake Shaw
  Special teams coordinator/Inside linebackers
- Kirkland Parker
  Defensive backs
- Ryland Widener
  Defensive line
- Blake Crandall
  Running backs
- Jamal Brown
  Safeties

Legend

- (C) Team captain
- (S) Suspended
- (I) Ineligible
- Injured
- Redshirt

Roster
Last update: November 29, 2023
