= List of Great American Conference football standings =

This is a list of yearly Great American Conference football standings. The Great American Conference is a National Collegiate Athletic Association Division II conference for American football.

== Great American standings ==
2011 Great American Conference football standings
| | Conf. | | | Overall |
| Team | W | | L | W | | L |
|---|---|---|---|---|---|---|
| Ouachita Baptist $ | 6 | – | 1 | 7 | – | 3 |
| Henderson State | 4 | – | 1 | 6 | – | 4 |
| East Central | 6 | – | 2 | 8 | – | 3 |
| Arkansas–Monticello | 3 | – | 3 | 5 | – | 6 |
| Harding | 3 | – | 3 | 4 | – | 7 |
| Southern Arkansas | 3 | – | 4 | 3 | – | 7 |
| SW Oklahoma State | 3 | – | 5 | 5 | – | 6 |
| Arkansas Tech | 1 | – | 4 | 2 | – | 8 |
| SE Oklahoma State | 1 | – | 7 | 2 | – | 8 |
$ – Conference champion; ^ – NCAA Division II playoff participant; Rankings from AFCA poll

2012 Great American Conference football standings
| | Conf. | | | Overall |
| Team | W | | L | W | | L |
|---|---|---|---|---|---|---|
| No. 11 Henderson State $^ | 8 | – | 0 | 10 | – | 1 |
| No. 19 Harding ^ | 7 | – | 1 | 9 | – | 2 |
| Southern Arkansas # | 5 | – | 3 | 7 | – | 4 |
| Ouachita Baptist | 4 | – | 4 | 6 | – | 4 |
| East Central | 4 | – | 4 | 6 | – | 5 |
| Arkansas Tech | 3 | – | 5 | 5 | – | 6 |
| SE Oklahoma State | 2 | – | 6 | 4 | – | 6 |
| SW Oklahoma State | 2 | – | 6 | 3 | – | 7 |
| Arkansas–Monticello | 0 | – | 8 | 1 | – | 10 |
$ – Conference champion; ^ – NCAA Division II playoff participant; # – C.H.A.M.P.S. Heart of Texas Bowl participant; Rankings from AFCA poll

2013 Great American Conference football standings
| | Conf. | | | Overall |
| Team | W | | L | W | | L |
|---|---|---|---|---|---|---|
| No. 13 Henderson State $^ | 10 | – | 0 | 11 | – | 1 |
| Harding # | 8 | – | 2 | 9 | – | 2 |
| Ouachita Baptist | 7 | – | 3 | 7 | – | 3 |
| Southern Arkansas | 6 | – | 4 | 6 | – | 4 |
| SW Oklahoma State | 6 | – | 4 | 6 | – | 5 |
| East Central | 5 | – | 5 | 5 | – | 5 |
| Arkansas Tech | 5 | – | 5 | 5 | – | 6 |
| Arkansas–Monticello | 4 | – | 6 | 5 | – | 6 |
| NW Oklahoma State * | 2 | – | 8 | 2 | – | 9 |
| SE Oklahoma State | 2 | – | 8 | 2 | – | 9 |
| Southern Nazarene | 0 | – | 10 | 0 | – | 11 |
$ – Conference champion; ^ – NCAA Division II playoff participant; # – Live United Texarkana Bowl participant * – Provisional NCAA Division II member; Rankings from AFCA poll

2014 Great American Conference football standings
| | Conf. | | | Overall |
| Team | W | | L | W | | L |
|---|---|---|---|---|---|---|
| No. 9 Ouachita Baptist $^ | 10 | – | 0 | 10 | – | 1 |
| No. 17 Harding ^ | 9 | – | 1 | 9 | – | 2 |
| No. 25 Henderson State | 8 | – | 2 | 9 | – | 2 |
| SE Oklahoma State # | 6 | – | 4 | 7 | – | 5 |
| East Central # | 6 | – | 4 | 6 | – | 5 |
| Southern Arkansas | 5 | – | 5 | 5 | – | 5 |
| NW Oklahoma State * | 3 | – | 7 | 3 | – | 7 |
| SW Oklahoma State | 3 | – | 7 | 3 | – | 7 |
| Arkansas Tech | 3 | – | 7 | 3 | – | 8 |
| Arkansas–Monticello | 2 | – | 8 | 2 | – | 8 |
| Southern Nazarene | 0 | – | 10 | 0 | – | 11 |
$ – Conference champion; ^ – NCAA Division II playoff participant; # – bowl game participant (East Central: C.H.A.M.P.S. Heart of Texas Bowl, SE Oklahoma State: Live United Texarkana Bowl) * – Provisional NCAA Division II member; Rankings from AFCA poll

2015 Great American Conference football standings
| | Conf. | | | Overall |
| Team | W | | L | W | | L |
|---|---|---|---|---|---|---|
| No. 12 Henderson State $^ | 10 | – | 1 | 11 | – | 2 |
| SW Oklahoma State # | 8 | – | 3 | 8 | – | 4 |
| Arkansas Tech # | 8 | – | 3 | 9 | – | 3 |
| Harding | 7 | – | 4 | 7 | – | 4 |
| Ouachita Baptist | 7 | – | 4 | 7 | – | 4 |
| Southern Arkansas | 7 | – | 4 | 7 | – | 4 |
| SE Oklahoma State | 6 | – | 5 | 6 | – | 5 |
| East Central | 6 | – | 5 | 6 | – | 5 |
| NW Oklahoma State | 3 | – | 8 | 3 | – | 8 |
| Oklahoma Baptist * | 2 | – | 9 | 2 | – | 9 |
| Arkansas–Monticello | 1 | – | 10 | 1 | – | 10 |
| Southern Nazarene] | 1 | – | 10 | 1 | – | 10 |
$ – Conference champion; ^ – NCAA Division II playoff participant; # – bowl participant (Arkansas Tech: C.H.A.M.P.S. Heart of Texas Bowl, SW Oklahoma State: Live United Texarkana Bowl) * – Provisional NCAA Division II member; Rankings from AFCA poll

2016 Great American Conference football standings
| | Conf. | | | Overall |
| Team | W | | L | W | | L |
|---|---|---|---|---|---|---|
| No. 6 Harding $^ | 11 | – | 0 | 13 | – | 1 |
| Southern Arkansas # | 9 | – | 2 | 9 | – | 3 |
| Henderson State | 8 | – | 3 | 8 | – | 3 |
| Ouachita Baptist | 7 | – | 4 | 7 | – | 4 |
| SE Oklahoma State | 7 | – | 4 | 7 | – | 4 |
| Arkansas Tech | 6 | – | 5 | 6 | – | 5 |
| SW Oklahoma State | 5 | – | 6 | 5 | – | 6 |
| Arkansas–Monticello | 4 | – | 7 | 4 | – | 7 |
| NW Oklahoma State | 4 | – | 7 | 4 | – | 7 |
| Oklahoma Baptist * | 2 | – | 9 | 2 | – | 9 |
| Southern Nazarene | 2 | – | 9 | 2 | – | 9 |
| East Central | 1 | – | 10 | 1 | – | 10 |
$ – Conference champion; ^ – NCAA Division II playoff participant; # – Live United Texarkana Bowl participant * – Provisional Division II member; Rankings from AFCA poll

2017 Great American Conference football standings
| | Conf. | | | Overall |
| Team | W | | L | W | | L |
|---|---|---|---|---|---|---|
| Ouachita Baptist $^ | 9 | – | 2 | 9 | – | 3 |
| No. 6 Harding ^ | 8 | – | 3 | 11 | – | 4 |
| Arkansas Tech # | 8 | – | 3 | 8 | – | 4 |
| Southern Arkansas | 7 | – | 4 | 7 | – | 4 |
| SE Oklahoma State | 7 | – | 4 | 7 | – | 4 |
| Henderson State | 6 | – | 5 | 6 | – | 5 |
| Arkansas–Monticello | 5 | – | 6 | 5 | – | 6 |
| NW Oklahoma State | 5 | – | 6 | 5 | – | 6 |
| Southern Nazarene | 4 | – | 7 | 4 | – | 7 |
| SW Oklahoma State | 3 | – | 8 | 3 | – | 8 |
| East Central | 2 | – | 9 | 2 | – | 9 |
| Oklahoma Baptist | 2 | – | 9 | 2 | – | 9 |
$ – Conference champion; ^ – NCAA Division II playoff participant; # – Live United Texarkana Bowl participant; Rankings from AFCA poll

2018 Great American Conference football standings
| | Conf. | | | Overall |
| Team | W | | L | W | | L |
|---|---|---|---|---|---|---|
| No. 6 Ouachita Baptist $^ | 11 | – | 0 | 12 | – | 1 |
| No. 20 Harding ^ | 9 | – | 2 | 9 | – | 3 |
| Southern Arkansas # | 8 | – | 3 | 8 | – | 4 |
| SE Oklahoma State | 6 | – | 5 | 6 | – | 5 |
| Arkansas–Monticello # | 6 | – | 5 | 6 | – | 6 |
| Henderson State | 5 | – | 6 | 5 | – | 6 |
| Oklahoma Baptist | 5 | – | 6 | 5 | – | 6 |
| NW Oklahoma State | 4 | – | 7 | 4 | – | 7 |
| Arkansas Tech | 3 | – | 8 | 3 | – | 8 |
| East Central | 3 | – | 8 | 3 | – | 8 |
| Southern Nazarene | 3 | – | 8 | 3 | – | 8 |
| SW Oklahoma State | 3 | – | 8 | 3 | – | 8 |
$ – Conference champion; ^ – NCAA Division II playoff participant; # – bowl participant (Arkansas–Monticello: Heritage Bowl, Southern Arkansas: Live United Texarkana Bowl; Rankings from AFCA poll

2019 Great American Conference football standings
| | Conf. | | | Overall |
| Team | W | | L | W | | L |
|---|---|---|---|---|---|---|
| No. 14 Ouachita Baptist $^ | 11 | – | 0 | 11 | – | 1 |
| No. 15 Harding ^ | 10 | – | 1 | 10 | – | 2 |
| Henderson State # | 9 | – | 2 | 9 | – | 3 |
| Southern Arkansas # | 8 | – | 3 | 8 | – | 4 |
| Oklahoma Baptist | 7 | – | 4 | 7 | – | 4 |
| Arkansas–Monticello | 5 | – | 6 | 5 | – | 6 |
| NW Oklahoma State | 4 | – | 7 | 4 | – | 7 |
| Arkansas Tech | 3 | – | 8 | 3 | – | 8 |
| East Central | 3 | – | 8 | 3 | – | 8 |
| SW Oklahoma State | 3 | – | 8 | 3 | – | 8 |
| Southern Nazarene | 2 | – | 9 | 2 | – | 9 |
| SE Oklahoma State | 1 | – | 10 | 1 | – | 10 |
$ – Conference champion; ^ – NCAA Division II playoff participant; # – bowl participant (Southern Arkansas: Heritage Bowl, Henderson State: Live United Texarkana Bowl); Rankings from AFCA poll

2020 Great American Conference football standings
| | Conf. | | | Overall |
| Team | W | | L | W | | L |
|---|---|---|---|---|---|---|
| East Central | | – | | 2 | – | 0 |
| Southern Nazarene | | – | | 0 | – | 3 |
Notes: Due to COVID-19, the Great American Conference suspended the fall 2020 football season. The conference also announced no in-conference competition for spring 2021 play. Schools scheduled own games if desired to play. Arkansas Tech, Arkansas–Monticello, Harding, Henderson State, NW Oklahoma State, Oklahoma Baptist, Ouachita Baptist, SE Oklahoma State, Southern Arkansas and SW Oklahoma State opted out of the spring season. Southern Nazarene counted all their games as exhibition, while East Central and a few others teams that played Southern Nazarene did not, and counted their game in statistical records.

2021 Great American Conference football standings
| | Conf. | | | Overall |
| Team | W | | L | W | | L |
|---|---|---|---|---|---|---|
| No. 10 Harding $^ | 10 | – | 1 | 11 | – | 2 |
| Henderson State | 9 | – | 2 | 9 | – | 2 |
| No. 23 Ouachita Baptist | 9 | – | 2 | 9 | – | 2 |
| SE Oklahoma State # | 8 | – | 3 | 9 | – | 3 |
| Oklahoma Baptist # | 7 | – | 4 | 8 | – | 4 |
| East Central | 7 | – | 4 | 7 | – | 4 |
| Arkansas–Monticello | 5 | – | 6 | 5 | – | 6 |
| Arkansas Tech | 4 | – | 7 | 4 | – | 7 |
| Southern Arkansas | 4 | – | 7 | 4 | – | 7 |
| NW Oklahoma State | 2 | – | 9 | 2 | – | 9 |
| Southern Nazarene | 1 | – | 10 | 1 | – | 10 |
| SW Oklahoma State | 0 | – | 11 | 0 | – | 11 |
$ – Conference champion; ^ – NCAA Division II playoff participant; # – bowl participant (Oklahoma Baptist: Heritage Bowl, SE Oklahoma State: Live United Texarkana Bowl); Rankings from AFCA poll

2022 Great American Conference football standings
| | Conf. | | | Overall |
| Team | W | | L | W | | L |
|---|---|---|---|---|---|---|
| No. 10 Ouachita Baptist $^ | 11 | – | 0 | 11 | – | 1 |
| No. 22 Harding | 9 | – | 2 | 9 | – | 2 |
| East Central # | 8 | – | 3 | 9 | – | 3 |
| Henderson State | 8 | – | 3 | 8 | – | 3 |
| SE Oklahoma State # | 6 | – | 5 | 6 | – | 6 |
| Arkansas Tech | 5 | – | 6 | 5 | – | 6 |
| Southern Arkansas | 5 | – | 6 | 5 | – | 6 |
| Southern Nazarene | 5 | – | 6 | 5 | – | 6 |
| SW Oklahoma State | 4 | – | 7 | 4 | – | 7 |
| Arkansas–Monticello | 3 | – | 8 | 3 | – | 8 |
| Oklahoma Baptist | 1 | – | 10 | 1 | – | 10 |
| NW Oklahoma State | 1 | – | 10 | 1 | – | 10 |
$ – Conference champion; ^ – NCAA Division II playoff participant; # – bowl participant (East Central: Heritage Bowl, SE Oklahoma State: Live United Texarkana Bowl); Rankings from AFCA poll

2023 Great American Conference football standings
| | Conf. | | | Overall |
| Team | W | | L | W | | L |
|---|---|---|---|---|---|---|
| No. 1 Harding $^ | 11 | – | 0 | 15 | – | 0 |
| No. 24 Henderson State ^ | 9 | – | 2 | 9 | – | 3 |
| Ouachita Baptist | 9 | – | 2 | 9 | – | 2 |
| Southern Arkansas # | 9 | – | 2 | 10 | – | 2 |
| Oklahoma Baptist | 6 | – | 5 | 6 | – | 5 |
| Southern Nazarene # | 6 | – | 5 | 6 | – | 6 |
| Arkansas Tech | 5 | – | 6 | 5 | – | 6 |
| SE Oklahoma State | 5 | – | 6 | 5 | – | 6 |
| East Central | 3 | – | 8 | 3 | – | 8 |
| Arkansas–Monticello | 2 | – | 9 | 2 | – | 9 |
| NW Oklahoma State | 1 | – | 10 | 1 | – | 10 |
| SW Oklahoma State | 0 | – | 11 | 0 | – | 11 |
$ – Conference champion; ^ – NCAA Division II playoff participant; # – bowl participant (Southern Nazarene: Heritage Bowl, Southern Arkansas: Live United Texarkana Bowl); Rankings from AFCA poll
