= 2021 East Central Tigers football team =

American college football season

2021 East Central Tigers football
- Conference: Great American Conference
- Record: 7–4 (7–4 GAC)
- Head coach: Al Johnson (4th season)
- Offensive coordinator: Kris McCullough (2nd season)
- Offensive scheme: Hurry-up, no-huddle spread
- Defensive coordinator: John Litrenta (2nd season)
- Base defense: 3–4
- Home stadium: Koi Ishto Stadium

2021 Great American Conference football standings
	Conf.			Overall
Team	W		L	W		L
No. 10 Harding $^	10	–	1	11	–	2
Henderson State	9	–	2	9	–	2
No. 23 Ouachita Baptist	9	–	2	9	–	2
SE Oklahoma State #	8	–	3	9	–	3
Oklahoma Baptist #	7	–	4	8	–	4
East Central	7	–	4	7	–	4
Arkansas–Monticello	5	–	6	5	–	6
Arkansas Tech	4	–	7	4	–	7
Southern Arkansas	4	–	7	4	–	7
NW Oklahoma State	2	–	9	2	–	9
Southern Nazarene	1	–	10	1	–	10
SW Oklahoma State	0	–	11	0	–	11
$ – Conference champion; ^ – NCAA Division II playoff participant; # – bowl participant (Oklahoma Baptist: Heritage Bowl, SE Oklahoma State: Live United Texarkana Bowl); Rankings from AFCA poll

The 2021 East Central Tigers football team represented East Central University (ECU) as a member of the Great American Conference (GAC) during the 2021 NCAA Division II football season. Led by Al Johnson in his fourth and final season as head coach, the Tigers finished compiled an overall record of 7–4 with an identical mark in conference play, tying for fifth place in the GAC. The team played home games at Koi Ishto Stadium in Ada, Oklahoma.

On March 17, 2022, Johnson was hired to be the running backs coach for the Wisconsin Badgers. East Central's offensive coordinator, Kris McCullough, was named the Tigers' interim head coach before being promoted to full-time head coach in the middle of the 2022 season.

== Schedule ==
Date	Time	Opponent	Site	Result	Attendance
September 4	6:00 p.m.	at No. 22 Harding	First Security Stadium; Searcy, AR	L 0–28	3,500
September 11	6:00 p.m.	Arkansas Tech	Koi Ishto Stadium; Ada, OK	W 13–10	0
September 18	8:15 p.m.	Southern Nazarene^{†}	Koi Ishto Stadium; Ada, OK	W 40–13	3,071
September 25	6:00 p.m.	at Northwestern Oklahoma State	Ranger Field; Alva, OK	W 20–17 ^{OT}	6,500
October 2	2:00 p.m.	Southern Arkansas	Koi Ishto Stadium; Ada, OK	W 38–17	3,114
October 9	2:00 p.m.	at No. 9 Henderson State	Carpenter–Haygood Stadium; Arkadelphia, AR	L 24–59	3,016
October 16	6:00 p.m.	Oklahoma Baptist	Koi Ishto Stadium; Ada, OK	L 20–47	2,115
October 23	2:00 p.m.	at Southwestern Oklahoma State	Milam Stadium; Weatherford, OK	W 44–34	402
October 30	2:00 p.m.	No. 6 Ouachita Baptist	Koi Ishta Stadium; Ada, OK	L 28–43	3,114
November 6	2:00 p.m.	at Arkansas–Monticello	Cotton Boll Stadium; Monticello, AR	W 35–10	0
November 13	2:00 p.m.	at Southeastern Oklahoma State	Paul Laird Field; Durant, OK	W 30–28	2,132
^{†}Homecoming; Rankings from AFCA Poll released prior to the game; All times are in Central time

== Preseason ==
=== GAC coaches poll ===
The GAC coaches preseason poll was released on August 3, 2021. The Tigers were predicted to finish sixth in the conference.

== Game summaries ==
=== At No. 22 Harding ===
East Central Tigers at No. 22 Harding Bisons – Game summary

Quarter	1	2	3	4	Total
Tigers	0	0	0	0	0
No. 22 Bisons	21	0	7	0	28

at First Security Stadium, Searcy, Arkansas

- Date: September 4
- Game time: 6:00 p.m. CDT
- Game weather: Sunny, 93 °F (34 °C)
- Game attendance: 3,500
- Referee: Ron Standridge
- Box score, Recap

Game information
First quarter
- HAR – Cole Chancey 6-yard run (Grant Ennis kick), 13:02. Bisons 7–0. Drive: 4 plays, 16 yards, 1:39.
- HAR – Omar Sinclair 72-yard run (Grant Ennis kick), 11:49. Bisons 14–0. Drive: 1 play, 72 yards, 0:13.
- HAR – Cole Chancey 1-yard run (Grant Ennis kick), 0:44. Bisons 21–0. Drive: 13 plays, 56 yards, 7:33.

Second quarter

- No scoring plays

Third quarter

- HAR – Cole Chancey 24-yard run (Grant Ennis kick), 4:06. Bisons 28–0. Drive: 2 plays, 27 yards, 0:51.

Fourth quarter

- No scoring plays

Statistics	ECU	HAR
First downs	9	16
Total yards	146	374
Rushing yards	48	333
Passing yards	98	41
Turnovers	5	2
Time of possession	22:54	37:35

Team	Category	Player	Statistics
East Central	Passing	Kenny Hrncir	11/25, 98 yards, 4 INT
East Central	Rushing	Ontario Douglas	13 rushes, 45 yards
East Central	Receiving	Jackson McFalane	2 receptions, 23 yards
Harding	Passing	Preston Paden	2/3, 41 yards
Harding	Rushing	Cole Chancey	17 rushes, 102 yards, 3 TD
Harding	Receiving	Roland Wallace	1 reception, 32 yards

=== Arkansas Tech ===
Arkansas Tech Wonder Boys at East Central Tigers – Game summary

Quarter	1	2	3	4	Total
Wonder Boys	0	3	0	7	10
Tigers	3	3	7	0	13

at Koi Ishto Stadium, Ada, Oklahoma

- Date: September 11
- Game time: 6:00 p.m. CDT
- Game weather: Sunny, 90 °F (32 °C)
- Game attendance: 0
- Referee: Tommy Little
- Box score, Recap

Game information
First quarter
- ECU – Garret Clark 27-yard field goal, 9:48. Tigers 3–0. Drive: 10 plays, 60 yards, 4:35.

Second quarter

- ATU – Jesus Zizumbo 26-yard field goal, 13:44. Tied 3–3. Drive: 12 plays, 55 yards, 5:58.
- ECU – Garret Clark 28-yard field goal, 9:00. Tigers 6–3. Drive: 12 plays, 74 yards, 4:37.

Third quarter

- ECU – Ontario Douglas 5-yard run (Garret Clark kick), 12:19. Tigers 13–3. Drive: 4 plays, 57 yards, 1:29.

Fourth quarter

- ATU – Brandon Hunter 3-yard run (Jesus Zizumbo kick), 5:23. Tigers 13–10. Drive: 16 plays, 94 yards, 7:29.

Statistics	ATU	ECU
First downs	16	21
Total yards	232	418
Rushing yards	164	289
Passing yards	68	129
Turnovers	1	1
Time of possession	26:39	33:21

Team	Category	Player	Statistics
Arkansas Tech	Passing	Jack Lindsey	12/25, 68 yards, INT
Arkansas Tech	Rushing	Caleb Batie	17 rushes, 98 yards
Arkansas Tech	Receiving	Tucker Kennedy	3 receptions, 22 yards
East Central	Passing	Kenny Hrncir	11/23, 129 yards, INT
East Central	Rushing	Ontario Douglas	29 rushes, 170 yards, TD
East Central	Receiving	Chris Shaw	2 receptions, 50 yards
