= Mike Cochran =

Mike Cochran may refer to:

- Mike Cochran (American football) (fl. 1980s–2010s), American football player and coach
- Mike Cochran (journalist) (c. 1936–2022), American journalist

== See also ==
- Mike Cochrane (fl. 1970s–2020s), musician and actor
