= 2003 NAIA football rankings =

Legend
	Increase in ranking
	Decrease in ranking
	Not ranked previous week
*	NAIA National Champion
т	Tied with team above or below also with this symbol

One human poll made up the 2003 National Association of Intercollegiate Athletics (NAIA) football rankings, sometimes called the NAIA Coaches' Poll or the football ratings. Once the regular season was complete, the NAIA sponsored a playoff to determine the year's national champion. A final poll was then taken after completion of the 2003 NAIA Football National Championship.

== Poll release dates ==
The poll release dates were:

- August 26, 2003 (Preseason)
- September 9, 2003 (Week 1)
- September 16, 2003 (Week 2)
- September 23, 2003 (Week 3)
- September 30, 2003 (Week 4)
- October 7, 2003 (Week 5)
- October 14, 2003 (Week 6)
- October 21, 2003 (Week 7)
- October 28, 2003 (Week 8)
- November 4, 2003 (Week 9)
- November 11, 2003 (Week 10)
- November 16, 2003 (Final)
- January 12, 2004 (Postseason)

== Week by week poll ==
	Week 0-Preseason Aug 26	Week Poll 1 Sep 9	Week Poll 2 Sep 16	Week Poll 3 Sep 23	Week Poll 4 Sep 30	Week Poll 5 Oct 7	Week Poll 6 Oct 14	Week Poll 7 Oct 21	Week Poll 8 Oct 28	Week Poll 9 Nov 4	Week Poll 10 Nov 11	Week Final Nov 16	Week Postseason Jan 12	
1.	Carroll (MT)	Carroll (MT)	Carroll (MT)	Carroll (MT)	Carroll (MT)	Carroll (MT)	Carroll (MT)	Carroll (MT)	Carroll (MT)	Carroll (MT)	Carroll (MT)	Carroll (MT)	*Carroll (MT)	1.
2.	Georgetown (KY)	Georgetown (KY)	McKendree (IL)	McKendree (IL)	McKendree (IL)	McKendree (IL)	McKendree (IL)	Sioux Falls (SD)	Sioux Falls (SD)	Sioux Falls (SD)	Sioux Falls (SD)	Sioux Falls (SD)	Northwestern Oklahoma State	2.
3.	Sioux Falls (SD)	Sioux Falls (SD)	Sioux Falls (SD)	Sioux Falls (SD)	Sioux Falls (SD)	Sioux Falls (SD)	Sioux Falls (SD)	Dickinson State (ND)	Dickinson State (ND)	Dickinson State (ND)	Dickinson State (ND)	Dickinson State (ND)	Sioux Falls (SD)	3.
4.	McKendree (IL)	McKendree (IL)	Northwestern Oklahoma State	Northwestern Oklahoma State	Dickinson State (ND)	Dickinson State (ND)	Dickinson State (ND)	MidAmerica Nazarene (KS)	MidAmerica Nazarene (KS)	MidAmerica Nazarene (KS)	MidAmerica Nazarene (KS)	MidAmerica Nazarene (KS)	Saint Francis (IN)	4.
5.	Southern Oregon	Southern Oregon	Southern Oregon	Dickinson State (ND)	Georgetown (KY)	Georgetown (KY)	Georgetown (KY)	Saint Francis (IN)	Saint Francis (IN)	Saint Francis (IN)	Saint Francis (IN)	Saint Francis (IN)	Dickinson State (ND)	5.
6.	Northwestern Oklahoma State	Northwestern Oklahoma State	Dickinson State (ND)	Evangel (MO)	MidAmerica Nazarene (KS)	MidAmerica Nazarene (KS)	MidAmerica Nazarene (KS)	Northwestern Oklahoma State	Northwestern Oklahoma State	Northwestern Oklahoma State	Northwestern Oklahoma State	Northwestern Oklahoma State	Mary (ND)	6.
7.	Dickinson State (ND)	Dickinson State (ND)	Evangel (MO)	Georgetown (KY)	Saint Francis (IN)	Saint Francis (IN)	Saint Francis (IN)	Mary (ND)	Mary (ND)	Mary (ND)	Mary (ND)	Mary (ND)	Northwestern (IA)	7.
8.	Mary (ND)	Evangel (MO)	Georgetown (KY)	Mary (ND)	Azusa Pacific (CA)	Azusa Pacific (CA)	Northwestern Oklahoma State	McKendree (IL)	McKendree (IL)	McKendree (IL)	McKendree (IL)	Northwestern (IA)	MidAmerica Nazarene (KS)	8.
9.	Evangel (MO)	Mary (ND)	Mary (ND)	MidAmerica Nazarene (KS)	Northwestern Oklahoma State	Northwestern Oklahoma State	Benedictine (KS)	Azusa Pacific (CA)	Azusa Pacific (CA)	Azusa Pacific (CA)	Northwestern (IA)	Azusa Pacific (CA)	St. Ambrose (IA)	9.
10.	MidAmerica Nazarene (KS)	MidAmerica Nazarene (KS)	MidAmerica Nazarene (KS)	Azusa Pacific (CA)	Northwestern (IA)	Northwestern (IA)	Mary (ND)	Evangel (MO)	Northwestern (IA)	Northwestern (IA)	Azusa Pacific (CA)	Georgetown (KY)	Lambuth (TN)	10.
11.	Saint Francis (IN)	Azusa Pacific (CA)	Azusa Pacific (CA)	Saint Francis (IN)	Benedictine (KS)	Benedictine (KS)	Evangel (MO)	Northwestern (IA)	Evangel (MO)	Georgetown (KY)	Georgetown (KY)	Lambuth (TN)	Georgetown (KY)	11.
12.	Azusa Pacific (CA)	Saint Francis (IN)	Saint Francis (IN)	St. Ambrose (IA)	Mary (ND)	Mary (ND)	Azusa Pacific (CA)	Georgetown (KY)	Georgetown (KY)	Lambuth (TN)	Lambuth (TN)	(T) Benedictine (KS)	Benedictine (KS)	12.
13.	St. Ambrose (IA)	St. Ambrose (IA)	St. Ambrose (IA)	Southern Oregon	Lambuth (TN)	Evangel (MO)	Northwestern (IA)	Tabor (KS)	Tabor (KS)	Benedictine (KS)	Benedictine (KS)	(T) Ottawa (KS)	Azusa Pacific (CA)	13.
14.	Montana Western	Walsh (OH)	Walsh (OH)	Northwestern (IA)	Evangel (MO)	Cumberlands (KY)	Tabor (KS)	Campbellsville (KY)	(T) Campbellsville (KY)	(T) Cumberlands (KY)	Ottawa (KS)	McKendree (IL)	Ottawa (KS)	14.
15.	Doane (NE)	Northwestern (IA)	Northwestern (IA)	Campbellsville (KY)	St. Ambrose (IA)	Southern Nazarene (OK)	Southern Nazarene (OK)	Lambuth (TN)	(T) Lambuth (TN)	(T) Ottawa (KS)	Cumberlands (KY)	Tabor (KS)	McKendree (IL)	15.
16.	Benedictine (KS)	Kansas Wesleyan	Hastings (NE)	Lambuth (TN)	Kansas Wesleyan	Minot State (ND)	Campbellsville (KY)	Walsh (OH)	Saint Xavier (IL)	Tabor (KS)	Tabor (KS)	St. Ambrose (IA)	Campbellsville (KY)	16.
17.	Saint Xavier (IL)	Hastings (NE)	Campbellsville (KY)	Benedictine (KS)	Southern Nazarene (OK)	Tabor (KS)	Walsh (OH)	Saint Xavier (IL)	Walsh (OH)	Evangel (MO)	(T) Minot State (ND)	Campbellsville (KY)	Tabor (KS)	17.
18.	Kansas Wesleyan	Lambuth (TN)	Lambuth (TN)	Trinity International (IL)	Hastings (NE)	Campbellsville (KY)	Midland Lutheran (NE)	Benedictine (KS)	Benedictine (KS)	Minot State (ND)	(T) Campbellsville (KY)	Minot State (ND)	Minot State (ND)	18.
19.	Minot State (ND)	Saint Xavier (IL)	Benedictine (KS)	Kansas Wesleyan	Cumberlands (KY)	Walsh (OH)	Lambuth (TN)	Cumberlands (KY)	(T) Cumberlands (KY)	Campbellsville (KY)	Walsh (OH)	Trinity International (IL)	Trinity International (IL)	19.
20.	Lambuth (TN)	Campbellsville (KY)	Valley City State (ND)	Southern Nazarene (OK)	Tabor (KS)	Midland Lutheran (NE)	Cumberlands (KY)	Ottawa (KS)	(T) Ottawa (KS)	Saint Xavier (IL)	Trinity International (IL)	Cumberlands (KY)	Cumberlands (KY)	20.
21.	Walsh (OH)	Benedictine (KS)	Kansas Wesleyan	Tabor (KS)	Minot State (ND)	Lambuth (TN)	Ottawa (KS)	Hastings (NE)	Southern Nazarene (OK)	Walsh (OH)	St. Ambrose (IA)	Saint Xavier (IL)	Saint Xavier (IL)	21.
22.	Missouri Valley (MO)	Bacone (OK)	Trinity International (IL)	Minot State (ND)	Walsh (OH)	(T) St. Ambrose (IA)	St. Ambrose (IA)	Midland Lutheran (NE)	Minot State (ND)	Olivet Nazarene (IL)	Evangel (MO)	Walsh (OH)	Walsh (OH)	22.
23.	Northwestern (IA)	Doane (NE)	Southern Nazarene (OK)	Hastings (NE)	Campbellsville (KY)	(T) Ottawa (KS)	Saint Xavier (IL)	Southern Nazarene (OK)	Midland Lutheran (NE)	St. Ambrose (IA)	Nebraska Wesleyan	Montana Western	Southern Oregon	23.
24.	Hastings (NE)	Valley City State (ND)	Tabor (KS)	Nebraska Wesleyan	Southern Oregon	Saint Xavier (IL)	Minot State (ND)	Olivet Nazarene (IL)	Olivet Nazarene (IL)	Trinity International (IL)	Midland Lutheran (NE)	Southern Oregon	Montana Western	24.
25.	Campbellsville (KY)	(T) Montana Western; (T) Montana Tech	Minot State (ND)	Walsh (OH)	Midland Lutheran (NE)	Kansas Wesleyan	Hastings (NE)	Minot State (ND)	Peru State (NE)	Peru State (NE)	McPherson (KS)	Midland Lutheran (NE)	Midland Lutheran (NE)	25.
	Week 0-Preseason Aug 26	Week Poll 1 Sep 9	Week Poll 2 Sep 16	Week Poll 3 Sep 23	Week Poll 4 Sep 30	Week Poll 5 Oct 7	Week Poll 6 Oct 14	Week Poll 7 Oct 21	Week Poll 8 Oct 28	Week Poll 9 Nov 4	Week Poll 10 Nov 11	Week Final Nov 16	Week Postseason Jan 12	
		Dropped: Minot State (ND); Missouri Valley (MO)	Dropped: Saint Xavier (IL); Bacone (OK); Doane (NE); Montana Western; Montana Tech	Dropped: Valley City State (ND)	Dropped: Trinity International (IL); Nebraska Wesleyan	Dropped: Hastings (NE); Southern Oregon	Dropped: Kansas Wesleyan	Dropped: St. Ambrose (IA)	Dropped: Hastings (NE)	Dropped: Southern Nazarene (OK); Midland Lutheran (NE)	Dropped: Saint Xavier (IL); Olivet Nazarene (IL); Peru State (NE)	Dropped: Evangel (MO); Nebraska Wesleyan; McPherson (KS)	Dropped: NONE	

== Leading vote-getters ==
Since the inception of the Coaches' Poll in 1999, the #1 ranking in the various weekly polls has been held by only a select group of teams. Through the postseason poll of the 2003 season, the teams and the number of times they have held the #1 weekly ranking are shown below. The number of times a team has been ranked #1 in the postseason poll (the national champion) is shown in parentheses.

In 1999, the results of a postseason poll, if one was conducted, are not known. Therefore, an additional poll has been presumed, and the #1 postseason ranking has been credited to the postseason tournament champion, the Northwestern Oklahoma State Rangers.

Team	Total #1 Rankings
Georgetown (KY)	23 (2)
Carroll (MT)	14 (2)
Northwestern Oklahoma State	12 (1)
Sioux Falls (SD)	10
Azusa Pacific (CA)	3
