= Mike Cochran (American football) =

Playing career
- 1986–1989: Bethany (KS)

Coaching career (HC unless noted)
- 1990–1991: Bethany (KS) (OL)
- 1993–2000: MidAmerica Nazarene (OL/LB)
- 2001–2005: MidAmerica Nazarene
- 2006–2014: Southern Nazarene

Head coaching record
- Overall: 86–70
- Tournaments: 1–4 (NAIA playoffs)

Accomplishments and honors

Championships
- 2 HAAC (2002–2003); 2 CSFL (2006, 2011)

Awards
- 2× HAAC Coach of the Year (2002–2003); 2× CSFL Coach of the Year (2010–2011); AFCA Region Four Coach of the Year (2003); AFCA Region Five Coach of the Year (2011)

Michael Cochran is an American former football player and coach. He served as the head football coach at MidAmerica Nazarene University in Olathe, Kansas from 2001 to 2005 and at Southern Nazarene University in Bethany, Oklahoma from 2006 to 2014, compiling a career college football record of 86–70.

== Head coaching record ==
Year	Team	Overall	Conference	Standing	Bowl/playoffs
MidAmerica Nazarene Pioneers (Heart of America Athletic Conference) (2001–2005)
2001	MidAmerica Nazarene	8–3	7–3	3rd	W CMH Bowl
2002	MidAmerica Nazarene	9–2	9–1	1st	L NAIA First Round
2003	MidAmerica Nazarene	12–1	10–0	1st	L NAIA First Round
2004	MidAmerica Nazarene	10–3	8–2	T–2nd	L NAIA Quarterfinal
2005	MidAmerica Nazarene	7–3	7–2	3rd	
MidAmerica Nazarene:		46–12	41–8		
Southern Nazarene (Central States Football League) (2006–2011)
2006	Southern Nazarene	7–3	3–1	T–1st	
2007	Southern Nazarene	6–4	2–2	3rd	
2008	Southern Nazarene	3–8	1–3	T–3rd	
2009	Southern Nazarene	6–5	3–2	3rd	
2010	Southern Nazarene	7–4	4–1	2nd	
2011	Southern Nazarene	9–3	4–1	T–1st	L NAIA First Round
Southern Nazarene (NCAA Division II independent) (2012)
2012	Southern Nazarene	2–9			
Southern Nazarene (Great American Conference) (2013–2014)
2013	Southern Nazarene	0–11	0–10	11th	
2014	Southern Nazarene	0–11	0–10	11th	
Southern Nazarene:		40–58	17–30		
Total:		86–70			
National championship Conference title Conference division title or championship game berth
