= Dustin Hada =

American football coach (born c. 1977)

Current position
- Title: Head coach
- Team: Southern Nazarene
- Conference: GAC
- Record: 17–42

Biographical details
- Born: c. 1977 (age 48–49); Alva, Oklahoma, U.S.
- Education: MidAmerica Nazarene University (2000); Olivet Nazarene University (2002)

Playing career
- 1996–1999: MidAmerica Nazarene
- Position: Offensive lineman

Coaching career (HC unless noted)
- 2000: MidAmerica Nazarene (OL)
- 2000–2002: Olivet Nazarene (DL)
- 2003–2007: Olivet Nazarene (DC/DL/OLB/SS)
- 2008: Olivet Nazarene (DC/OLB/SS)
- 2009–2011: Southwest Oklahoma State (OL)
- 2012–2013: Southwest Oklahoma State (co-OC/OL)
- 2014–2015: Southwest Oklahoma State (AHC/co-OC)
- 2016: Northwestern Oklahoma State (AHC/OL)
- 2017–2019: Southern Nazarene (OC/OL)
- 2020–present: Southern Nazarene

Head coaching record
- Overall: 17–42
- Bowls: 0–1

Dustin Hada (born c. 1977) is an American college football coach. He is the head football coach for Southern Nazarene University, a position he has held since 2020. He also coached for MidAmerica Nazarene, Olivet Nazarene, Southwestern Oklahoma State, and Northwestern Oklahoma State. He played college football for MidAmerica Nazarene as an offensive lineman.

== Head coaching record ==
Year	Team	Overall	Conference	Standing	Bowl/playoffs
Southern Nazarene Crimson Storm (Great American Conference) (2020–present)
2020–21	Southern Nazarene	0–3	0–0	N/A	
2021	Southern Nazarene	1–10	1–10	11th	
2022	Southern Nazarene	5–6	5–6	T–6th	
2023	Southern Nazarene	6–6	6–5	T–5th	L Heritage
2024	Southern Nazarene	3–8	3–8	T–9th	
2025	Southern Nazarene	2–9	2–9	T–9th	
2026	Southern Nazarene	0–0	0–0		
Southern Nazarene:		17–42	17–38		
Total:		17–42			
