= WSRG =

WSRG may refer to:

- WSRG-LD, a low-power television station (channel 32, virtual 59) licensed to serve Scranton, Pennsylvania, United States
- WSRG-LP, a defunct low-power radio station (106.1 FM) formerly licensed to serve Worcester, Massachusetts, United States
- WQDC, a radio station (97.7 FM) licensed to serve Sturgeon Bay, Wisconsin, United States, which held the call sign WSRG from 1995 to 2013
