= Paul McGrady =

American college athletics coach and administrator (born c. 1960)

Biographical details
- Born: c. 1960 (age 65–66)

Playing career

Football
- 1978–1981: East Central
- 1982: Birmingham Stallions*

Track and field
- 1978–1981: East Central
- Positions: Shot put (track and field)

Coaching career (HC unless noted)

Football
- 1999–2005: Southern Nazarene

Basketball
- 1986–1994: Southern Nazarene (assistant)

Track and field
- 1994–1998: Southern Nazarene

Cross country
- 1994–1998: Southern Nazarene

Administrative career (AD unless noted)
- 1988–2019: Southern Nazarene (assoc. AD)

Head coaching record
- Overall: 35–23 (football)

Accomplishments and honors

Awards
- 3× All-OIC (1979–1981)

Paul McGrady (born c. 1960) is an American former college athletics coach and administrator. He was the head football, track and field, and cross country for Southern Nazarene University between 1994 and 2005. He also assisted with the basketball team from 1986 to 1994. As head football coach, McGrady he led the team to an overall record of 35–23. He played college football for East Central and professionally for the Birmingham Stallions of the United States Football League (USFL).

== Head coaching record ==
=== Football ===
Year	Team	Overall	Conference	Standing
Southern Nazarene Crimson Storm (NAIA independent) (2000–2003)
2000	Southern Nazarene	5–4		
2001	Southern Nazarene	5–4		
2002	Southern Nazarene	7–3		
2003	Southern Nazarene	6–4		
Southern Nazarene Crimson Storm (Central States Football League) (2004–2005)
2004	Southern Nazarene	6–4	4–2	3rd
2005	Southern Nazarene	6–4	4–2	T–3rd
Southern Nazarene:		35–23	8–4	
Total:		35–23		
