= McGrady =

McGrady is a surname of Irish origin originating in Galway. Notable people with this name include:

- Barbara McGrady (born 1950) Indigenous Australian photographer
- Eddie McGrady (1935–2013), Northern Ireland nationalist politician
- Ewan McGrady, Australian rugby league footballer
- Jason McGrady (born 1979), American physician
- Kevin McGrady (born 1956), convicted Irish Republican Army member
- Martin McGrady (1946–2006), American sprinter
- Michael McGrady (born 1960), American actor
- Mike McGrady (1933–2012), American journalist and writer
- Niamh McGrady, Northern Irish actress
- Paul McGrady, college football coach
- Tony McGrady (born 1944), Australian politician
- Tracy McGrady (born 1979), American retired basketball player
- Ryan McGrady (Born 1982), Environmental Scientist

== See also ==
- Robert McGrady Blackburn (1919–2002), American bishop
- McGrady Cove, a cove at the head of Newcomb Bay in the Windmill Islands
