= 2003 NAIA football season =

College football season

- National Championship: Jim Carroll Stadium; Savannah, TN; December 20, 2003
- Champion: Carroll (MT)
- Player of the Year: Tyler Emmert (quarterback, Carroll (MT))

The 2003 NAIA football season was the component of the 2003 college football season organized by the National Association of Intercollegiate Athletics (NAIA) in the United States. The season's playoffs, known as the NAIA Football National Championship, culminated with the championship game on December 20, at Jim Carroll Stadium in Savannah, Tennessee. The Carroll Fighting Saints defeated the Northwestern Oklahoma State Rangers, 41–28, in the title game to win the program's second consecutive NAIA championship.

== Conference standings ==
2003 Central States Football League standings
	Conf.			Overall
Team	W		L	W		L
No. 2 NW Oklahoma State $^	5	–	0	11	–	2
Peru State	3	–	2	7	–	4
Bacone	3	–	2	5	–	6
Langston	2	–	3	2	–	8
Haskell	1	–	4	3	–	6
SAGU	1	–	4	2	–	8
$ – Conference champion; ^ – NAIA playoff participant; Rankings from NAIA Coaches' Poll

2003 Dakota Athletic Conference football standings
	Conf.			Overall
Team	W		L	W		L
No. 5 Dickinson State $^	9	–	0	11	–	1
No. 6 Mary $	8	–	1	10	–	2
No. 18 Minot State	7	–	2	7	–	3
Black Hills State	5	–	4	5	–	4
Valley City State	4	–	5	5	–	5
Jamestown	4	–	5	4	–	6
Huron	3	–	6	4	–	6
South Dakota Mines	3	–	6	3	–	7
Dakota State	2	–	7	2	–	8
Mayville State	0	–	9	1	–	9
$ – Conference champion; ^ – NAIA playoff participant; Rankings from NAIA Coaches' Poll

2003 Frontier Conference football standings
	Conf.			Overall
Team	W		L	W		L
No. 1 Carroll (MT) $^	8	–	0	15	–	0
No. 24 Montana Western	6	–	2	7	–	4
Montana Tech	3	–	5	3	–	8
Rocky Mountain	2	–	6	2	–	8
Montana State–Northern	1	–	7	1	–	9
$ – Conference champion; ^ – NAIA playoff participant; Rankings from NAIA Coaches' Poll

2003 Great Plains Athletic Conference football standings
	Conf.			Overall
Team	W		L	W		L
No. 3 Sioux Falls $^	10	–	0	12	–	1
No. 7 Northwestern (IA) ^	9	–	1	10	–	2
Hastings	6	–	4	6	–	4
No. 25 Midland Lutheran	6	–	4	6	–	4
Nebraska Wesleyan	6	–	4	6	–	4
Concordia (NE)	5	–	5	5	–	5
Dakota Wesleyan	4	–	6	5	–	6
Doane	4	–	6	4	–	6
Morningside	3	–	7	3	–	7
Dana	2	–	8	2	–	9
Briar Cliff	0	–	10	0	–	10
$ – Conference champion; ^ – NAIA playoff participant; Rankings from NAIA Coaches' Poll

2003 Heart of America Athletic Conference football standings
	Conf.			Overall
Team	W		L	W		L
No. 8 MidAmerica Nazarene $^	10	–	0	12	–	1
No. 12 Benedictine (KS) ^	9	–	1	9	–	3
Evangel	6	–	4	6	–	4
Avila	5	–	5	5	–	5
Graceland	5	–	5	5	–	5
Missouri Valley	5	–	5	5	–	5
Baker	4	–	6	4	–	6
Culver–Stockton	4	–	6	4	–	6
William Jewell	3	–	7	3	–	7
Lindenwood	2	–	8	3	–	8
Central Methodist	2	–	8	2	–	8
$ – Conference champion; ^ – NAIA playoff participant; Rankings from NAIA Coaches' Poll

2003 Kansas Collegiate Athletic Conference football standings
	Conf.			Overall
Team	W		L	W		L
No. 14 Ottawa $^	9	–	0	9	–	2
No. 17 Tabor ^	8	–	1	9	–	2
McPherson	5	–	4	6	–	4
Bethany (KS)	5	–	4	5	–	4
Southwestern (KS)	5	–	4	5	–	5
Kansas Wesleyan	4	–	5	4	–	6
Bethel (KS)	4	–	5	4	–	5
Friends	3	–	6	3	–	6
Saint Mary (KS)	2	–	7	2	–	8
Sterling	0	–	9	0	–	10
$ – Conference champion; ^ – NAIA playoff participant; Rankings from NAIA Coaches' Poll

2003 Mid-South Conference football standings
	Conf.			Overall
Team	W		L	W		L
No. 11 Georgetown (KY) +^	8	–	1	9	–	3
No. 10 Lambuth +^	8	–	1	9	–	3
No. 16 Campbellsville	7	–	2	9	–	2
No. 20 Cumberland (KY)	7	–	2	8	–	2
Pikeville	3	–	6	4	–	6
Union (KY)	3	–	6	4	–	7
Cumberland (TN)	3	–	6	3	–	7
Belhaven	2	–	7	4	–	7
Virginia–Wise	2	–	7	3	–	8
Bethel (TN)	2	–	7	2	–	9
+ – Conference co-champions; ^ – NAIA playoff participant; Rankings from NAIA Coaches' Poll

2003 Mid-States Football Association standings
	Conf.			Overall
Team	W		L	W		L
Mideast League
No. 4 Saint Francis (IN) x^	6	–	0	12	–	1
No. 22 Walsh	5	–	1	8	–	3
Geneva	4	–	2	7	–	4
Quincy	3	–	3	5	–	6
Urbana	2	–	4	3	–	8
Taylor	1	–	5	2	–	8
Malone	0	–	6	2	–	8
Midwest League
No. 15 McKendree ^	5	–	2	8	–	3
No. 19 Trinity International x	5	–	2	8	–	3
No. 9 St. Ambrose x^	5	–	2	8	–	4
No. 21 Saint Xavier x	5	–	2	7	–	4
Olivet Nazarene x	5	–	2	6	–	4
William Penn	2	–	5	2	–	8
Iowa Wesleyan	1	–	6	1	–	9
St. Francis (IL)	0	–	7	1	–	9
x – League champion/co-champions ^ – NAIA playoff participant; Rankings from NAIA Coaches' Poll

2003 Upper Midwest Athletic Conference football standings
	Conf.			Overall
Team	W		L	W		L
North
Martin Luther x	5	–	2	7	–	2
Northwestern (MN) x	5	–	2	6	–	4
Minnesota Morris	4	–	2	5	–	6
Crown	3	–	4	4	–	7
Trinity Bible	0	–	7	0	–	9
South
Westminster (MO) x$	7	–	0	7	–	2
Rockford	5	–	1	7	–	3
Principia	2	–	5	3	–	6
Maranatha Baptist	2	–	5	2	–	7
Blackburn	1	–	6	2	–	8
$ – Conference champion; x – Division champion/co-champions

2003 NAIA independents football records
	Conf.			Overall
Team	W		L	W		L
No. 13 Azusa Pacific ^		–		8	–	2
Edward Waters		–		7	–	4
Texas College		–		7	–	3
Southern Oregon		–		5	–	4
Allen		–		4	–	6
Webber International		–		3	–	7
Paul Quinn		–		1	–	6
Southern Virginia		–		0	–	10
Waldorf		–		0	–	11
^ – NAIA playoff participant; Rankings from NAIA Coaches' Poll
