= 2003 Carroll Fighting Saints football team =

American college football season

2003 Carroll Fighting Saints football

NAIA national champion Frontier champion

NAIA National Championship Game, W 41–28 vs. Northwestern Oklahoma State
- Conference: Frontier Conference
- Record: 15–0 (8–0 Frontier)
- Head coach: Mike Van Diest (5th season)
- Home stadium: Nelson Stadium

2003 Frontier Conference football standings
| | Conf. | | | Overall |
| Team | W | | L | W | | L |
|---|---|---|---|---|---|---|
| No. 1 Carroll (MT) $^ | 8 | – | 0 | 15 | – | 0 |
| No. 24 Montana Western | 6 | – | 2 | 7 | – | 4 |
| Montana Tech | 3 | – | 5 | 3 | – | 8 |
| Rocky Mountain | 2 | – | 6 | 2 | – | 8 |
| Montana State–Northern | 1 | – | 7 | 1 | – | 9 |
$ – Conference champion; ^ – NAIA playoff participant; Rankings from NAIA Coaches' Poll

The 2003 Carroll Fighting Saints football team was an American football team that represented Carroll College as a member of the Frontier Conference during the 2003 NAIA football season. In their fifth season under head coach Mike Van Diest, the Saints compiled a perfect 15–0 record (8–0 against conference opponents) and won the NAIA national championship, defeating Northwestern Oklahoma State, 41–28, in the NAIA National Championship Game.

Carroll's sophomore quarterback Tyler Emmert received the 2003 NAIA Football Player of the Year Award. In 2003, Carroll's offense under Emmert averaged more than 40 points and approximately 500 yards per game.

The team played its home games at Nelson Stadium in Helena, Montana.

== Schedule ==
| Date | Opponent | Site | Result | Attendance | Source |
|---|---|---|---|---|---|
| August 29 | at Central Washington* | Tomlinson Stadium; Ellensburg, WA | W 38–28 | | |
| September 6 | at Montana Tech | Alumni Coliseum; Butte, MT | W 19–16 | | |
| September 13 | Montana Western | Nelson Stadium; Helena, MT | W 36–10 | 3,546 | |
| September 20 | University of Calgary* | Nelson Stadium; Helena, MT | W 54–0 | | |
| September 27 | Rocky Mountain | Nelson Stadium; Helena, MT | W 56–6 | 3,813 | |
| October 4 | at MSU Northern | Tilleman Field; Havre, MT | W 58–17 | | |
| October 11 | at Montana Western | Bulldog Stadium; Dillon, MT | W 34–21 | | |
| October 25 | Eastern Oregon* | Nelson Stadium; Helena, MT | W 59–7 | | |
| November 1 | MSU Northern | Nelson Stadium; Helena, MT | W 57–0 | | |
| November 8 | at Rocky Mountain | Community Stadium; Billings, MT | W 50–21 | | |
| November 15 | Montana Tech | Nelson Stadium; Helena, MT | W 45–7 | | |
| November 22 | McKendree* | Nelson Stadium; Helena, MT | W 40–7 | 3,021 | |
| November 29 | University of Mary* | Nelson Stadium; Helena, MT | W 49–7 | 3,853 | |
| December 6 | Saint Francis (IN)* | Nelson Stadium; Helena, MT | W 38–14 | 5,021 | |
| December 20 | vs. Northwestern Oklahoma State* | Jim Carroll Stadium; Savannah, TN (NAIA Championship Game) | W 41–28 | 5,189 | |
*Non-conference game
