= Lloyd V. Berkner High School =

School in Richardson, Texas, United States

Location
- 1600 E Spring Valley Rd; Richardson, (Dallas County), Texas 75081; United States; 32°56′10″N 96°41′35″W

Information
- School type: Public, high school
- Established: 1969
- School district: Richardson ISD
- NCES District ID: 4837020.
- CEEB code: 445841
- NCES School ID: 483702004124.
- Principal: Farrah Smock
- Teaching staff: 184.50 (FTE)
- Grades: 9–12
- Age: 14 to 18
- Enrollment: 2,290 (2022-23)
- Student to teacher ratio: 12.41
- Language: English
- Colours: Green and White
- Mascot: Rams
- Rival: Lake Highlands High School
- National ranking: 1. 1017
- Feeder schools: Apollo Junior High School, Liberty Junior High School
- Website: schools.risd.org/BerknerHS

Lloyd V. Berkner High School is a high school in Richardson, in the U.S. state of Texas, with a 2008 enrollment of 2,755 and a student/teacher ratio of 16.7. It is one of four high schools in the Richardson Independent School District.

Richardson, Texas highlighted in red

== History ==
The school was founded in 1969 and is named for U.S. physicist and founding president of the University of Texas at Dallas (actually in Richardson), Lloyd Berkner.

For the first year, students were housed on the campus of the now-closed Richardson Junior High School. The current facility on Spring Valley Road opened for the 1970–1971 school year; it served grades 9–11 in its opening year. Grades 10–12 were then served until the end of the 2004–2005 school year.

During the 1974–1975 school year, Berkner served Freshmen in order to relieve overcrowding at Richardson Jr. High while the new Liberty Jr. High was completed for the following Fall. From 1976 to 1979, Berkner again served Freshman in order to relieve overcrowding at Liberty Jr. High. A massive expansion and renovation gave way to the addition of ninth grade in the 2005–2006 school year.

== Statistics (per 2011) ==
The attendance rate for students at the school is 95%, compared with a state average of 96%. 44% of the students at Berkner are economically disadvantaged, 17% enroll in special education, 4% enroll in gifted and talented programs, 24% are enrolled in career and technology programs, and 21% are considered "limited English proficient."

The ethnic makeup of the school is 23.58% Hispanic, 27.76% African American, 27.62% White, non-Hispanic, 16.01% Asian/Pacific Islander, and less than 1% Native American.

The average class sizes at Berkner are 25 students for English, 21 for foreign language, 27 for math, 23 for science, and 24 for social studies.

Teachers at the school carry, on average, 10 years of teaching experience, and 7% of the teachers on staff are first-year teachers.

== Awards ==
In 2007 the school won the Excellence in Education Award for the state of Texas. It was honored by the Texas Successful School Awards System in 2000 and 2001. Berkner was also named a National Blue Ribbon School in 1988–1989.

Berkner is ranked #1017 in the Top 1300 high schools in the U.S. by Newsweek magazine.

== Academics ==
Berkner ranks its students based on a weighted GPA, in which Advanced Placement classes and Pre-AP classes add 10 and 5 points, respectively, to each student's final average in that class. In contrast to a decision by a selection committee, the valedictorian and salutatorian are the first and second highest averages of each graduating class, with the Top 10 receiving special gratitude at a reception dinner.

== Extracurricular activities ==
Berkner's mascot is the Ram and the team shares Ram-Wildcat Stadium (capacity 11,000) with Lake Highlands High School. The athletics program has improved in recent years, as in 2005, BHS had the best football season in school history, finishing 12–1 after a loss to A&M Consolidated High School in the quarterfinals of the Class 5A division. In the spring of 2006, the boys' basketball team made the state semifinals for the first time in school history.

Berkner prides itself on its fine arts programs. The marching band has received 50 consecutive first Division ratings in University Interscholastic League marching contests. The Orchestra Program has won the TMEA Honor String Orchestra award in 1987 under Ruth Kurtis – and most recently won the same award in 2007 under Craig Needham. The theatre program provides one of the area's only technical theatre programs. The school's student newspaper is the Berkner Rampage. The inter-school radio and television station is KRAM-FM and KRAM-TV Channel 6.

The "Mighty Ram Band" has approximately 300 students in its program. In the spring semester, the band splits into four bands; Symphonic Band I, Symphonic Band II, Symphonic Band III, and Concert Band I. Other classes offered during the school day include a Music Theory Course, two Jazz Bands; Jazz I, and Jazz II, a Percussion Ensemble, a drum-line, and a varsity and junior varsity Color Guard / Winter Guard. The band was honored by the John Philip Sousa Foundation with the Sudler Flag of Honor in 1984 and 2004 to recognize its high standards of excellence in its concert activities over several years. The Berkner Band has been invited to perform at the Midwest International Band and Orchestra Clinic twice in 2011 and 2019 and has been named the Texas Music Educators Association (TMEA) Honor Band for the state of Texas in 1974, 1987, and 1991, 2nd place in 2002, 2011, and 2013 and 5th place in 2000 and 2015. The Berkner Marching Band has advanced to the Texas UIL State Marching Contest numerous times. TEXAS UIL STATE MARCHING CONTEST PLACING 1994 5A-7th place, 1998 5A-7th place*, 2000 5A-7th place*, 2002 5A-3rd place* Bronze Medal Winner, 2004 5A-14th place, 2006 5A-9th place*, 2008 5A-11th place, 2010 5A-8th place*, 2012 5A-9th place*, 2014 6A-18th place, 2016 6A-21st place, 2023 6A-34th place *finalist The Berkner Marching Band also participates in the Bands of America marching contests and the Band of America Super Regional.

The school is also notable for hosting an annual battle of the bands held in the auditorium. It is one of the larger BOBs held in the area and features mostly rock and punk bands. There is the occasional appearance of rap and hip-hop groups. Despite the requirement of having a band member be a Berkner High student to compete, bands from across the metroplex have performed. One notable guest band includes Bowling for Soup. The event is held typically in April or May. The event is sponsored by Peer Helpers and the Berkner Exchange Club. Since 2005, the 'house' band has been 'Old Skool', Berkner's own all-faculty cover band. Old Skool performs at the conclusion of the competition while the judges are tabulating the scores.

The Berkner High School Academic Decathlon team has advanced to the Texas State Academic Decathlon competition every year since 2003–2004.

The Berkner High School drill team, known as the Bandoleras, has performed with excellence over the past several decades. They have won major competitions at a national level, including the Starmakers series of drill team events. Their Spring Shows consistently sell out the BHS auditorium and are a regular draw on the Richardson arts scene. In 2012, the Bandoleros were given the opportunity to travel to Ireland to be in the St. Patrick's Day parade in Dublin. In addition to the Bandoleras, the hand-picked Comedy Troop draws many to the show because of its humorous skits.

Berkner tennis team members won third place in district competition in 2007–2008. The team itself has consistently produced tennis players with Super-Champion rankings in the TTCA.

== Notable alumni ==
- Naser Jason Abdo - Former United States Army Soldier, attempted terrorist
- Jensen Ackles, actor and musician
- Rogers Cadenhead, author
- Laurie Corbelli, former Olympic volleyball player and current college volleyball head coach
- Jillian Edwards, musician
- Keenan Evans (born 1996), college basketball player for Texas Tech, professional basketball player in the Israeli Basketball Premier League
- Trevis Gipson, attended freshman through junior years
- Keilahn Harris, NFL wide receiver for the Pittsburgh Steelers
- Maggie Haney, head coach of Monmouth Gymnastics in NJ and head coach to 2016 Olympic gold medal gymnast Laurie Hernandez
- Melissa Henderson, former professional soccer player
- Toddrick McIntosh, former NFL defensive lineman
- Ryan Miller (musician), member of alternative rock band Guster
- Mo3 (rapper), rapper
- Kevin Murphy, former NFL linebacker
- James Ortiz - actor, director and puppeteer. Performed and voiced Rocky from Project Hail Mary.
- Aqib Talib, NFL player
- Aundra Thompson, NFL wide receiver
- Frank Ticheli, composer
- Everson Walls, NFL defensive back
