= Aundra Thompson =

American football player (born 1953)

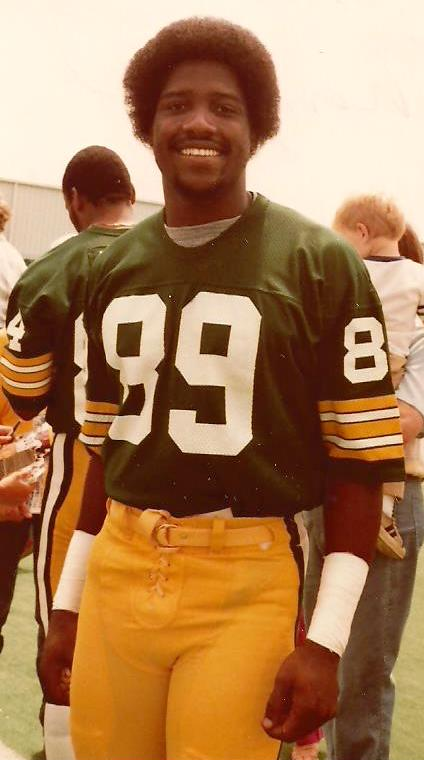
- Thompson with the Green Bay Packers in 1981

No. 43, 81, 89
- Position: Wide receiver

Personal information
- Born: January 2, 1953 (age 73); Dallas, Texas, U.S.
- Listed height: 6 ft 1 in (1.85 m)
- Listed weight: 186 lb (84 kg)

Career information
- High school: Berkner (TX)
- College: Texas A&M-Commerce
- NFL draft: 1976: 5th round, 132nd overall pick

Career history
- Green Bay Packers (1977–1981); San Diego Chargers (1981); New Orleans Saints (1981–1982); Baltimore Colts (1983)

Career NFL statistics
- Receptions: 109
- Receiving yards: 1,792
- Receiving touchdowns: 8
- Stats at Pro Football Reference

Aundra Thompson (born January 2, 1953) is an American former professional football player who was a wide receiver in the National Football League (NFL). He played college football at Texas A&M-Commerce Lions and was selected by the Green Bay Packers in the fifth round of the 1976 NFL draft. In 1981, he left the Packers and joined the San Diego Chargers.

Thompson also played for the New Orleans Saints and Baltimore Colts.
