= Al Johnson (guard) =

American football player and coach (born 1979)

Temple Owls football
- Title: Offensive line coach

Personal information
- Born: January 27, 1979 (age 47); Brussels, Wisconsin, U.S.
- Listed height: 6 ft 5 in (1.96 m)
- Listed weight: 305 lb (138 kg)

Career information
- High school: Southern Door (Brussels, Wisconsin)
- College: Wisconsin
- NFL draft: 2003: 2nd round, 38th overall pick

Career history

Playing
- Dallas Cowboys (2003–2006); Arizona Cardinals (2007–2008); Miami Dolphins (2008); New England Patriots (2009)*
- * Offseason or practice squad member only

Coaching
- Southern Door HS (WI) (2013) Offensive coordinator & offensive line coach; St. Norbert (2014–2015) Offensive coordinator & offensive line coach; Wisconsin (2016–2017) Graduate assistant; East Central (2018–2021) Head coach; Wisconsin (2022) Running backs coach; Montana State (2023–2024) Offensive line coach; Temple (2025–present) Offensive line coach

Awards and highlights
- Second-team All-Big Ten (2002)

Career NFL statistics
- Games played: 66
- Games started: 45
- Fumble recoveries: 2
- Stats at Pro Football Reference

Al Joseph Johnson (born January 27, 1979) is an American football coach and former player who currently serves as the Offensive Line Coach for the Temple Owls football program. He served as the head football coach of the East Central University in Ada, Oklahoma from 2018 to 2021. Johnson played professionally as a center and guard in the National Football League (NFL) for the Dallas Cowboys, Arizona Cardinals and Miami Dolphins. He played college football at the University of Wisconsin–Madison.

== Early life ==
Johnson attended Southern Door High School in Brussels, Wisconsin, where he was two-way football player, earning second-team All-American from Prep Football Report, Packerland conference player of the year and All-State honors. He played in the Wisconsin Shrine Game.

As a senior, he won the state title in the shot put and was named the conference player of the year in basketball.

== College career ==
Johnson accepted a football scholarship from the University of Wisconsin–Madison along with his cousin Ben Johnson. As a redshirt freshman, he appeared in 7 games, playing mainly on the field goal and extra point conversion lines.

He became a starter at center in the second game of his sophomore season, when All-American Casey Rabach was moved to right guard. He started every game as a junior. He was named team captain and received second-team All-Big Ten honors as a senior.

== Professional career ==
Pre-draft measurables
Height	Weight	Arm length	Hand span	40-yard dash
6 ft 3 1/2 in (1.92 m)	305 lb (138 kg)	34 1/4 in (0.87 m)	9 3/8 in (0.24 m)	4.95 s
All values from NFL Combine/Pro Day

=== Dallas Cowboys ===
One of the priorities in Bill Parcells first season as the head coach of the Dallas Cowboys was improving the center position play. To that end, he made Andre Gurode concentrate on playing guard and selected Johnson in the second round (38th overall) of the 2003 NFL draft. In training camp he was named the starter, but suffered a right knee injury during a practice that required microfracture surgery, which was thought to be career-threatening, because at the time not many players fully recovered from this medical procedure.

In 2004, Tyson Walter was named the starter at center, but suffered a sprained left knee in the second quarter of the season opener against the Minnesota Vikings, opening the door for Johnson to start in the rest of the games.

The next year, after facing competition in training camp from Gurode, he went on to start all 16 games, but still split time at center.

In 2006, he lost the starting position to Gurode, who went on to become a Pro Bowler. The Cowboys didn't re-sign him in free agency at the end of the season.

=== Arizona Cardinals ===
On March 5, 2007, the Arizona Cardinals signed him to a contract as a free agent. He started 14 games at center (missing weeks 2 and 3 with a left knee injury), as part of an offensive line that allowed the team's fewest sacks (24) in 20 years and that helped Edgerrin James rush for 1,222 yards.

In the 2008 off-season, Johnson underwent two surgeries on his left knee and was placed on the injured reserve list. On October 21, he was released with an injury settlement, after the team couldn't reach an agreement to restructure his contract.

=== Miami Dolphins ===
On November 29, 2008, Johnson was signed by the Miami Dolphins, reuniting with Bill Parcells, who was the Executive Vice President of Football Operations. He played as a reserve center and guard in only four games, because he experienced recurring problems with his left knee.

=== New England Patriots ===
On March 16, 2009, Johnson signed with the New England Patriots as an unrestricted free agent. He was waived with an injury settlement on August 6, to make room for Derrick Burgess.

== Coaching career ==
In 2013, Johnson was hired as the offensive coordinator at Southern Door High School. In 2014, he was an assistant football coach and offensive coordinator at NCAA Division III St. Norbert College. He also was an assistant coach at Southern Door High School in Brussels and a morning show personality on WQDC, which he owned. In 2016, he joined the University of Wisconsin football staff as an assistant offensive line coach. In December 2017, he was named the head football coach at East Central University in Ada, Oklahoma.

== Head coaching record ==
Year	Team	Overall	Conference	Standing
East Central Tigers (Great American Conference) (2018–2021)
2018	East Central	3–8	3–8	T–9th
2019	East Central	3–8	3–8	T–8th
2020–21	East Central	2–0	0–0	N/A
2021	East Central	7–4	7–4	T–5th
East Central:		15–20	13–20	
Total:		15–30		
