= Mike Cochran (journalist) =

American journalist (c. 1936–2022)

Mike Cochran (c. 1936 – January 11, 2022) was an American journalist. He worked for the Associated Press and the Fort Worth Star-Telegram. He was a pallbearer at the funeral of Lee Harvey Oswald. Cochran died on January 11, 2022, at the age of 85.
