= SNU Stadium =

Football stadium in Bethany, Oklahoma

- Interactive map of SNU Stadium
- Location: Bethany, Oklahoma 73008
- Coordinates: 35.521°N 97.662°W
- Owner: Southern Nazarene University
- Operator: Southern Nazarene University
- Capacity: 2,500
- Surface: FieldTurf

Construction
- Opened: 2001
- Renovated: 2003

Tenants
- Southern Nazarene Crimson Storm (NCAA) (2001–present); Bethany High School (2001–present)

SNU Stadium located in Bethany, Oklahoma is the home stadium of the NCAA Division II college football team the Crimson Storm of Southern Nazarene University.

SNU played their inaugural season at Taft Stadium in Oklahoma City. SNU Stadium opened on November 3, 2001. The next season SNU installed a press box. During this time SNU was a member of the National Association of Intercollegiate Athletics. In 2012, the program moved to NCAA Division II and became a member of the Great American Conference.

The stadium is also home to the Bethany High School Bronchos.
