= 2003 Saint Francis Cougars football team =

American college football season

2003 Saint Francis Cougars football

NAIA Playoff Semifinalist MSFA (MEL) champion
- Conference: Mid-States Football Association
- Mideast League
- Record: 12–1 (6–0 MSFA (MEL))
- Head coach: Kevin Donley (6th season)
- Home stadium: Cougar Stadium

2003 Mid-States Football Association standings
| | Conf. | | | Overall |
| Team | W | | L | W | | L |
|---|---|---|---|---|---|---|
Mideast League
| No. 4 Saint Francis (IN) x^ | 6 | – | 0 | 12 | – | 1 |
| No. 22 Walsh | 5 | – | 1 | 8 | – | 3 |
| Geneva | 4 | – | 2 | 7 | – | 4 |
| Quincy | 3 | – | 3 | 5 | – | 6 |
| Urbana | 2 | – | 4 | 3 | – | 8 |
| Taylor | 1 | – | 5 | 2 | – | 8 |
| Malone | 0 | – | 6 | 2 | – | 8 |
Midwest League
| No. 15 McKendree ^ | 5 | – | 2 | 8 | – | 3 |
| No. 19 Trinity International x | 5 | – | 2 | 8 | – | 3 |
| No. 9 St. Ambrose x^ | 5 | – | 2 | 8 | – | 4 |
| No. 21 Saint Xavier x | 5 | – | 2 | 7 | – | 4 |
| Olivet Nazarene x | 5 | – | 2 | 6 | – | 4 |
| William Penn | 2 | – | 5 | 2 | – | 8 |
| Iowa Wesleyan | 1 | – | 6 | 1 | – | 9 |
| St. Francis (IL) | 0 | – | 7 | 1 | – | 9 |
x – League champion/co-champions ^ – NAIA playoff participant; Rankings from NAIA Coaches' Poll

The 2003 Saint Francis Cougars football team represented the University of Saint Francis, located in Fort Wayne, Indiana, in the 2003 NAIA football season. They were led by head coach Kevin Donley, who served his 6th year as the first and only head coach in the history of Saint Francis football. The Cougars played their home games at Cougar Stadium and were members of the Mid-States Football Association (MSFA) Mideast League (MEL). The Cougars finished in 1st place in the MSFA MEL division, and they received an automatic bid to the 2003 postseason NAIA playoffs.

== Schedule ==
(12–1 overall, 6–0 conference)

| Date | Opponent | Rank | Site | Result | Attendance |
|---|---|---|---|---|---|
| September 13 | Tiffin* | | Cougar Stadium; Fort Wayne, IN | W 48–31 | 4,000 |
| September 20 | at William Penn* | | Oskaloosa Community Stadium; Oskaloosa, IA | W 49–14 | 1,000 |
| September 27 | St. Ambrose* | | Cougar Stadium; Fort Wayne, IN | W 45–40 | 4,500 |
| October 4 | Geneva | | Cougar Stadium; Fort Wayne, IN | W 49–16 | 4,200 |
| October 11 | at Butler* | | Bud and Jackie Sellick Bowl; Indianapolis, IN | W 47–16 | 2,450 |
| October 18 | at Urbana | | Wood Street Stadium; Urbana, OH | W 38–23 | 500 |
| October 25 | Taylor | | Cougar Stadium; Fort Wayne, IN | W 48–14 | 3,500 |
| November 1 | at Malone | | Fawcett Stadium; Canton, OH | W 36–14 | 1,200 |
| November 8 | Quincy | | Cougar Stadium; Fort Wayne, IN | W 34–13 | 3,200 |
| November 15 | at Walsh | | Fawcett Stadium; Canton, OH | W 41–24 | 2,528 |
| November 22 | Georgetown* | | Cougar Stadium; Fort Wayne, IN (NAIA First Round) | W 34–23 | 4,700 |
| November 29 | St. Ambrose* | | Cougar Stadium; Fort Wayne, IN (NAIA Quarterfinal) | W 41–14 | 3,900 |
| December 6 | at No. 1 Carroll* | No. 2 | Nelson Stadium; Helena, MT (NAIA Semifinal) | L 14–38 | 5,021 |
*Non-conference game; Rankings from Coaches' Poll released prior to the game

== Ranking movements ==
Ranking movements Legend: ██ Increase in ranking ██ Decrease in ranking
| | Week | | | | | | | | | | | |
| Poll | Pre | 1 | 2 | 3 | 4 | 5 | 6 | 7 | 8 | 9 | 10 | Final |
|---|---|---|---|---|---|---|---|---|---|---|---|---|
| NAIA Coaches' Poll | 11 | 12 | 12 | 11 | 7 | 7 | 7 | 5 | 5 | 5 | 5 | 5 |
