= Keilahn Harris =

American football player (born 2001)

Profile
- Position: Wide receiver

Personal information
- Born: January 8, 2001 (age 25); Richardson, Texas, U.S.
- Listed height: 5 ft 10 in (1.78 m)
- Listed weight: 180 lb (82 kg)

Career information
- High school: L.V. Berkner (Richardson, Texas)
- College: Oklahoma Baptist (2019–2022)
- NFL draft: 2023: undrafted

Career history
- Atlanta Falcons (2023)*; Pittsburgh Steelers (2024)*; Winnipeg Blue Bombers (2025)*
- * Offseason or practice squad member only

Awards and highlights
- 2× First-team All-GAC (2021, 2022)
- Stats at Pro Football Reference

Keilahn Harris (born January 8, 2001) is an American professional football wide receiver. He played college football for the Oklahoma Baptist Bison.

== Early life ==
Harris grew up in Richardson, Texas and attended Lloyd V. Berkner High School. He was an unranked wide receiver recruit who committed to playing college football at Oklahoma Baptist.

== College career ==
During Harris's true freshman season in 2019, he played in 11 games and finished the season with 24 receptions for 376 yards with three touchdowns and four total tackles (three solo stops and one assisted). The 2020 season was canceled due to the COVID-19 pandemic. During the 2021 season, he played in 12 games and finished the season with 92 receptions for 1,084 yards and 16 touchdowns while rushing for 15 yards on four carries and was named to the Don Hansen All-America Team. During the 2022 season, he played in 11 games and finished the season with 80 receptions for 1,050 yards and 7 touchdowns, while being named to the All-GAC First Team and the Elite 100 Watch List prior to the season.

== Professional career ==
Pre-draft measurables
Height	Weight	Arm length	Hand span	40-yard dash	10-yard split	20-yard split	20-yard shuttle	Three-cone drill	Vertical jump	Broad jump
5 ft 9 in (1.75 m)	183 lb (83 kg)	30 1/2 in (0.77 m)	9 in (0.23 m)	4.77 s	1.63 s	2.77 s	4.28 s	7.00 s	34 in (0.86 m)	9 ft 6 in (2.90 m)
All values from NFL Combine/Pro Day

On April 29, 2023, Harris signed with the Atlanta Falcons as an undrafted free agent after going unselected in the 2023 NFL draft. He was released on August 29, 2023, but re-signed to the practice squad on October 11, 2023. Harris was placed on the injured list on October 19, 2023, and later released on October 28, 2023.

On January 17, 2024, Harris signed a reserve/futures contract with the Pittsburgh Steelers. He was waived with an injury designation on May 21, 2024, but was reverted to an injured reserve the next day. He was waived again on May 28, 2024.

Harris later signed with the Winnipeg Blue Bombers of the Canadian Football League on November 22, 2024. He was released on June 1, 2025.
