= 2003 NAIA football national championship =

2003 NAIA Football Championship
	1st	2nd	3rd	4th	Total
Northwestern Oklahoma State	7	0	7	14	28
Carroll (MT)	3	14	24	0	41
- Date: December 20, 2003
- Stadium: Jim Carroll Stadium
- City: Savannah, Tennessee
- MOP (Offense): Tyler Emmert, Carroll
- MOP (Defense): Brett Bermingham, Carroll
- Attendance: 5,189
- Network: CSTV

The 2003 NAIA football championship series concluded on December 20, 2003 with the championship game played at Jim Carroll Stadium in Savannah, Tennessee. The game was won by the Carroll Fighting Saints over the Northwestern Oklahoma State Rangers by a score of 41–28.

== Scoring Summary ==
Scoring summary

Quarter	Time	Drive			Team	Scoring information	Score	
Quarter	Time	Plays	Yards	TOP	Team	Scoring information	Northwestern Oklahoma State Rangers	Carroll Fighting Saints
1	8:36	12	88	-	Carroll Fighting Saints	18-yard field goal by Rhett Crites	0	3
1	4:33	10	74	-	Northwestern Oklahoma State	Wes Scott 2-yard touchdown run, Keith Vermillion kick Good	7	3
2	13:42	3	36	-	Carroll Fighting Saints	Tyler Emmert 3-yard touchdown run, Rhett Crites kick Good	7	10
2	2:43	11	80	-	Carroll Fighting Saints	Mark Gallik 11-yard touchdown reception from Tyler Emmert, Rhett Crites kick Good	7	17
3	10:06	5	37	-	Carroll Fighting Saints	Mark Gallik 25-yard touchdown reception from Tyler Emmert, Rhett Crites kick Good	7	24
3	8:51	-	-	-	Carroll Fighting Saints	Interception returned 33 yards for touchdown by Brett Bermingham, Rhett Crites kick Good	7	31
3	8:35	-	-	-	Northwestern Oklahoma State Rangers	Patrick Crayton 59 yard kickoff return for a touchdown, Keith Vermillion Kick Good	14	31
3	7:14	3	60	-	Carroll Fighting Saints	Mark Gallik 58-yard touchdown reception from Tyler Emmert, Rhett Crites kick Good	14	38
3	1:02	9	64	-	Carroll Fighting Saints	23-yard field goal by Rhett Crites	14	41
4	14:23	10	65	-	Northwestern Oklahoma State Rangers	Sam Breeden 6-yard touchdown reception from Patrick Crayton, 2-point Patrick Crayton Pass No Good	20	41
4	0:09	1	41	-	Northwestern Oklahoma State Rangers	Michael Salters 41-yard touchdown reception from Patrick Crayton, 2-point Patrick Crayton Pass Good	28	41
"TOP" = time of possession. For other American football terms, see Glossary of American football.							Northwestern Oklahoma State Rangers	Carroll Fighting Saints

== Tournament bracket ==
1st Round; November 22
1	Carroll (MT)	40
14	McKendree (IL)	7
7	Mary (ND)	20
9	Azusa Pacific	2
5	Saint Francis (IN)	34
10	Georgetown (KY)	23
4	MidAmerica Nazarene	31
16	Saint Ambrose (IA)	32**
2	Sioux Falls (SD)	24
12	Benedictine (KS)	21
8	Northwestern (IA)	36
13	Ottawa (KS)	33
3	Dickinson State	12
11	Lambuth (TN)	6
6	NW Oklahoma State	63
15	Tabor (KS)	21

Quarterfinals; November 29
1	Carroll (MT)	49
7	Mary (ND)	7
5	Saint Francis (IN)	41
16	Saint Ambrose (IA)	14
2	Sioux Falls (SD)	33
8	Northwestern (IA)	7
3	Dickinson State	17
6	NW Oklahoma State	24

Semifinals; December 6
1	Carroll (MT)	38
5	Saint Francis (IN)	14
2	Sioux Falls (SD)	13
6	NW Oklahoma State	16

Championship; December 20
1	Carroll (MT)	41
6	NW Oklahoma State	28

- ** denotes Double OT.
