= John Litrenta =

American football player and coach (born 1992)

Current position
- Title: Head coach
- Team: East Central
- Conference: GAC
- Record: 14–20

Biographical details
- Born: c. 1992 (age 33–34); Orland Park, Illinois, U.S.
- Education: Olivet Nazarene University (2015); University of South Dakota (2017)

Playing career
- 2011–2014: Olivet Nazarene
- Position: Linebacker

Coaching career (HC unless noted)
- 2015: DuPage (DB)
- 2016–2017: South Dakota (DQC)
- 2018–2019: East Central (OLB)
- 2020–2022: East Central (DC)
- 2023–present: East Central

Head coaching record
- Overall: 14–20

John Litrenta (born c. 1992) is an American college football coach. He is the head football coach for East Central University, a position he has held since 2023. He played college football for Olivet Nazarene as a linebacker. He previously coached for DuPage, South Dakota, and as an assistant coach for East Central.

== Head coaching record ==
Year	Team	Overall	Conference	Standing	Bowl/playoffs
East Central Tigers (Great American Conference) (2023–present)
2023	East Central	3–8	3–8	9th	
2024	East Central	5–6	5–6	T–5th	
2025	East Central	6–6	6–5	T–6th	L First Americans
2026	East Central	0–0	0–0		
East Central:		14–20	14–19		
Total:		14–20			
