= WQDC =

Radio station in Wisconsin, United States

- Sturgeon Bay, Wisconsin; United States
- Frequency: 97.7 MHz
- Branding: Rewind 97.7

Programming
- Format: Classic hits

Ownership
- Owner: Michael Mesic; (Case Communications LLC)

History
- First air date: 1988; 38 years ago
- Former call signs: WDCW (1987–1990); WFNL (1990–1995); WSRG (1995–2013)

Technical information
- Licensing authority: FCC
- Facility ID: 21714
- Class: A
- ERP: 1,850 watts
- HAAT: 182 meters
- Transmitter coordinates: 44°54′14.00″N 87°22′13.00″W

Links
- Public license information: Public file; LMS
- Webcast: Listen Live
- Website: rewind977.com

WQDC (97.7 FM) is a radio station licensed to Sturgeon Bay, Wisconsin, United States, the station is currently owned by Michael & Carrie Mesic, through licensee Case Communications LLC.

== History ==
The station changed from a Hot AC format branded "Star 97.7" in May 2008.

On April 1, 2013, WSRG relaunched as "Door Country 97.7" under the new WQDC call letters.

On the evening of April 1, 2016, WQDC flipped to classic hits as "Rewind 97.7". The station posted a Facebook post to explain the change, saying "when Door Country FM 97.7 re-launched three years ago, there were 4 Country stations audible here in Door County. Today there are 7. Reaching number one in the format was a big goal for Case Communications; we have done that, and again, thank you for your listenership and participation. Now comes the time that we can no longer ignore the wants and changing needs of Door County listeners and advertisers."
