= Central States Football League =

College football conference in the United States

- Conference: NAIA
- Founded: 2000
- Commissioner: Tony Stigliano
- Sports fielded: 1 (football); men's: 1; women's: 0
- No. of teams: 0
- Headquarters: Waco, Texas
- Region: South Central United States
- Official website: centralstatesfootball.com

Locations
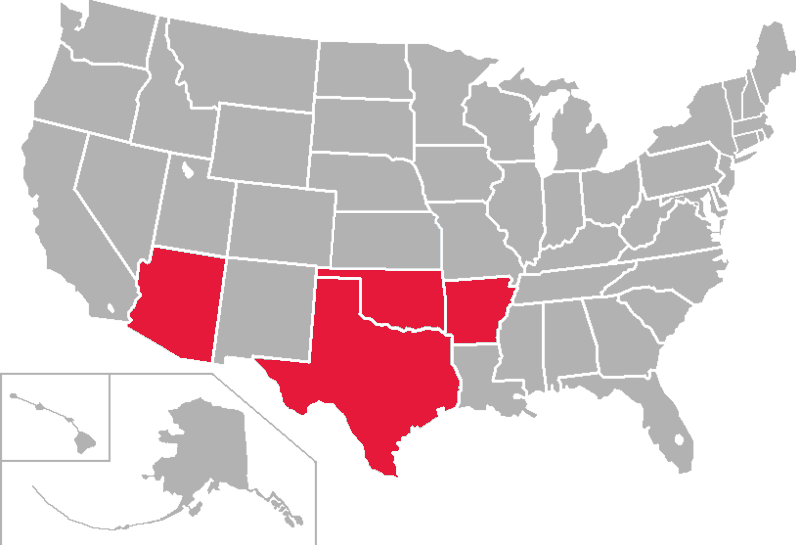

The Central States Football League (CSFL) was a college athletic conference affiliated with the NAIA. Member institutions were located in Oklahoma, Texas, Arkansas and Arizona and competed only in football. The conference was established in 2000 and its charter members included Haskell Indian Nations University, Langston University, Northwestern Oklahoma State University, Southwestern Assemblies of God University, and Peru State College. In 2017, the Sooner Athletic Conference, which served as the primary conference for the majority of the CSFL's membership decided to sponsor football beginning in 2018. As a result, the conference's membership shifted to that conference.

== Members ==
The Central States Football League did not compete in the 2012 season.

=== Final members ===
| Institution | Location | Founded | Enrollment | Nickname | Joined | Primary conference |
|---|---|---|---|---|---|---|
| Arizona Christian University | Phoenix, Arizona | 1960 | 683 | Firestorm | 2015 | Golden State |
| Bacone College | Muskogee, Oklahoma | 1880 | 900 | Warriors | 2002 | Sooner |
| Langston University | Langston, Oklahoma | 1897 | 2,700 | Lions | 2000; 2007 | Red River |
| Lyon College | Batesville, Arkansas | 1872 | 600 | Scots | 2015 | American Midwest |
| Oklahoma Panhandle State University | Goodwell, Oklahoma | 1909 | 1,720 | Aggies | 2007; 2017 | Sooner |
| Southwestern Assemblies of God University | Waxahachie, Texas | 1927 | 2,013 | Lions | 2000; 2003; 2008 | Sooner |
| Texas College | Tyler, Texas | 1894 | 600 | Steers | 2004 | Red River |
| Texas Wesleyan University | Fort Worth, Texas | 1890 | 2,647 | Rams | 2017 | Sooner |
| Wayland Baptist University | Plainview, Texas | 1908 | 8,000 | Pioneers | 2013 | Sooner |

=== Earlier members ===
| Institution | Location | Founded | Nickname | Joined | Left | Current conference |
|---|---|---|---|---|---|---|
| Haskell Indian Nations University | Lawrence, Kansas | 1884 | Fighting Indians | 2000 | 2006 | Dropped football |
| Lincoln University (MO) | Jefferson City, Missouri | 1866 | Blue Tigers | 2000 | 2001 | Great Lakes Valley (NCAA D-II) |
| Northwestern Oklahoma State University | Alva, Oklahoma | 1897 | Rangers | 2000 | 2012 | Great American (NCAA D-II) |
| Oklahoma Baptist University | Shawnee, Oklahoma | 1910 | Bison | 2013 | 2015 | Great American (NCAA D-II) |
| Peru State College | Peru, Nebraska | 1865 | Bobcats | 2000 | 2007 | Heart of America |
| Southern Nazarene University | Bethany, Oklahoma | 1899 | Crimson Storm | 2004 | 2012 | Great American (NCAA D-II) |

- Haskell Indian Nations — dropped football in 2015.

=== Membership timeline ===
Full member Alliance member
