= Southern Nazarene Crimson Storm football =

- First season: 2000; 26 years ago
- Athletic director: Danny Thomason
- Head coach: Dustin Hada; 4th season, 15–33 (.313)
- Location: Bethany, Oklahoma
- Stadium: SNU Stadium (capacity: 2,500)
- NCAA division: Division II
- Conference: Great American Conference
- Colors: Crimson and white
- All-time record: 102–154 (.398)
- Bowl record: 0–1 (.000)
- Consensus All-Americans: 62
- Fight song: Hail to the Team We Love!
- Mascot: Thundercat
- Marching band: The SNU Sound of the Storm Marching Band
- Website: snuathletics.com/football

The Southern Nazarene Crimson Storm football program was established in 2000. The Crimson Storm play their home games at SNU Stadium. In 2007, the Crimson Storm won their first home opener game. Since 2012, SNU has been competing in the NCAA Division II Great American Conference.

The current head coach for the Crimson Storm is Dustin Hada. Other coaches include: Kenneth West (assistant head coach, wide receivers), Indy Siehndel (defensive coordinator, secondary), Nathan Brown (special teams coordinator, offensive line), Stephen Price (inside linebackers), Scott Cooper (tight ends), Jake Owen (offensive graduate assistant), Jared Howell (defensive graduate assistant), James Love (defensive graduate assistant).

== Year-by-year results ==
Year	Record	Conf. record	Conference	Coach
2000	5–4	N/A	NAIA independent	Paul McGrady
2001	5–4	N/A	NAIA independent	Paul McGrady
2002	7–3	N/A	NAIA independent	Paul McGrady
2003	6–4	N/A	NAIA independent	Paul McGrady
2004	6–4	4–2	Central States Football League	Paul McGrady
2005	6–4	4–2	Central States Football League	Paul McGrady
2006	7–3	3–1	Central States Football League	Mike Cochran
2007	6–4	2–2	Central States Football League	Mike Cochran
2008	3–8	1–3	Central States Football League	Mike Cochran
2009	6–5	3–2	Central States Football League	Mike Cochran
2010	7–4	4–2	Central States Football League	Mike Cochran
2011	9–3	4–1	Central States Football League	Mike Cochran
2012	2–9	0–0*	Great American Conference	Mike Cochran
2013	0–11	0–10	Great American Conference	Mike Cochran
2014	0–11	0–10	Great American Conference	Mike Cochran
2015	1–10	1–10	Great American Conference	Craig Hubbard†
2016	2–9	2–9	Great American Conference	Andy Lambert
2017	4–7	4–7	Great American Conference	Andy Lambert
2018	3–8	3–8	Great American Conference	Andy Lambert
2019	2–9	2–9	Great American Conference	Andy Lambert
2021	1–10	1–10	Great American Conference	Dustin Hada
2022	5–6	5–6	Great American Conference	Dustin Hada
2023	6–6	6–5	Great American Conference	Dustin Hada
2024	3–8	3–8	Great American Conference	Dustin Hada
2025	2–9	2–9	Great American Conference	Dustin Hada

† interim head coach

== Head coaching history ==
- Paul McGrady, 2000–2005
- Mike Cochran, 2006–2014
- Craig Hubbard, 2015 (interim)
- Andy Lambert, 2016–2019
- Dustin Hada, 2020–present

== Postseason appearances ==
=== NAIA playoffs ===
The Crimson Storm have made one appearance in the NAIA playoffs, with a combined record of 0–1.

Year	Round	Opponent	Result
2011	First Round	MidAmerica Nazarene	L, 28–40

=== NCAA Division II bowl games ===
The Crimson Storm have made one NCAA Division II bowl game appearance, with a combined record of 0–1.

Year	Bowl	Opponent	Result
2023	Heritage Bowl	Emporia State	L, 20–55

== See also ==
- List of NCAA Division II football programs
