= Northwestern Oklahoma State Rangers football =

Northwestern Oklahoma State Rangers
- First season: 1898; 128 years ago
- Head coach: Jerry Partridge; 1st season, 0–0 (–)
- Location: Alva, Oklahoma
- Stadium: Ranger Field (capacity: 6,000)
- NCAA division: Division II
- Conference: GAC
- Colors: Black and red

NAIA national championships
- 1999
- Website: riderangersride.com

The Northwestern Oklahoma State Rangers football team represents Northwestern Oklahoma State University, located in Alva, Oklahoma, in NCAA Division II college football. Under previous university names, the team was also known as the Northwestern State Rangers.

The Rangers, who began playing football in 1898, compete as members of the Great American Conference.

Northwest Oklahoma have won one national championship when they were members of the NAIA, in 1999.

== History ==
=== Conferences ===
- 1929–1973: Oklahoma Collegiate Conference
- 1974–1996: Oklahoma Intercollegiate Conference II
- 1997–1999: NAIA Independent
- 2000–2011: Central States Football League
- 2012–present: Great American Conference

== Championships ==
=== National championships ===
Year	Association	Division	Head coach	Record	Opponent	Result
1999	NAIA (1)	Single (1)	Tim Albin	13–0	Georgetown (KY)	W, 34–26

== Postseason appearances ==
=== NAIA ===
The Rangers made twelve appearances in the NAIA playoffs, with a combined record of 10–12 and one national championship.

Year	Round	Opponent	Result
1987	First Round	Central Arkansas	L, 7–31
1989	Quarterfinals	Adams State	L, 22–30
1996	Semifinals	SW Oklahoma State	L, 7–17
1999	First Round; Quarterfinals; Semifinals; National Championship	Southwestern (KS); Lambuth; Mary (ND); Georgetown (KY)	W, 44–10; W, 56–13; W, 21–6; W, 34–26
2000	First Round; Quarterfinals; Semifinals; National Championship	Nebraska Wesleyan; MidAmerica Nazarene; Northwestern (IA); Georgetown (KY)	W, 40–13; W, 31–27; W, 42–7; L, 0–20
2001	First Round	Benedictine (KS)	L, 27–29
2002	First Round; Quarterfinals	Benedictine (KS); McKendree	W, 22–7; L, 27–32
2003	First Round; Quarterfinals; Semifinals; National Championship	Tabor; Dickinson State; Sioux Falls; Carroll (MT)	W, 63–21; W, 24–17; W, 16–13; L, 28–41
2004	First Round	Azusa Pacific	L, 0–16
2007	First Round	Sioux Falls	L, 7–35
2008	First Round; Quarterfinals	Friends (KS); Carroll (MT)	W, 42–7; Vacated
2010	First Round	Sioux Falls	L, 14–33

== Former players ==
- Lynn Scott – played for the Dallas Cowboys
- Patrick Crayton – played for the Dallas Cowboys and San Diego Chargers
- Jeff "The Hitman" Roberts - played for the Hilldale Hornets.
- Chip Myers -played for the San Francisco 49ers and Cincinnati Bengals
- Brian Sochia - played for the Houston Oilers and Miami Dolphins and Denver Broncos
- Brandon Christienson - played for the Jacksonville Jaguars and Baltimore Ravens and Oakland Raiders
