= List of Waldorf Warriors head football coaches =

The Waldorf Warriors football program is a college football team that represents Waldorf University in the Mid-States Football Association, a part of the National Association of Intercollegiate Athletics. The team has had seven head coaches since its first recorded football game in 2003. The current coach is David Calloway who first took the position for the 2026 season.

== Key ==
Key to symbols in coaches list
General		Overall		Conference		Postseason (Note: Although the first Rose Bowl Game was played in 1902, it has been continuously played since the 1916 game, and is recognized as the oldest bowl game by the NCAA. "—" indicates any season prior to 1916 when postseason games were not played.)	
No.	Order of coaches (Note: A running total of the number of head coaches, with coaches who served separate tenures being counted only once. Interim head coaches are represented with "Int" and are not counted in the running total. "—" indicates the team played but either without a coach or no coach is on record. "X" indicates an interim year without play.)	GC	Games coached	CW	Conference wins	PW	Postseason wins
DC	Division championships	OW	Overall wins	CL	Conference losses	PL	Postseason losses
CC	Conference championships	OL	Overall losses	CT	Conference ties	PT	Postseason ties
NC	National championships	OT	Overall ties (Note: Overtime rules in college football were introduced in 1996, making ties impossible in the period since.)	C%	Conference winning percentage		
†	Elected to the College Football Hall of Fame	O%	Overall winning percentage (Note: When computing the win–loss percentage, a tie counts as half a win and half a loss.)				

== Coaches ==
No.	Name	Term	GC	OW	OL	OT	O%	CW	CL	CT	C%	PW	PL	CCs	Awards
1	David Bolstorff	2003–2006	42	7	35	0	.167	—	—	—	—	—	—	—	—
2	Greg Youngblood	2007–2011	54	9	45	0	.167	—	—	—	—	—	—	—	—
3	Kent Anderson	2012–2016	52	11	41	0	.212	—	—	—	—	—	—	—	—
4	Josh Littrell	2017–2019	31	20	11	0	.645	—	—	—	—	—	—	—	—
5	Will Finley	2020–2022	30	20	10	0	.667	—	—	—	—	—	—	—	—
6	Tyler Chapa	2023–2025	31	4	27	0	.129	—	—	—	—	—	—	—	—
7	David Calloway	2026–present	0	0	0	0	–	—	—	—	—	—	—	—	—
