= David Calloway =

American football coach and former player

Current position
- Title: Head coach
- Team: Waldorf
- Conference: GPAC
- Record: 0–7

Biographical details
- Education: Langston (1997)

Playing career
- 1993–1996: Langston

Coaching career (HC unless noted)
- 1998–1999: Lane (LB)
- 2000–2003: Hastings (DC)
- 2004–2005: Langston (DC)
- 2006: Southeastern Oklahoma State (DL)
- 2007–2012: Texas A&M–Kingsville (DC)
- 2013–2014: Texas A&M–Kingsville
- 2015: Central Methodist (DC)
- 2016–2022: Central Methodist
- 2023–2024: Arkansas–Pine Bluff (DC)
- 2025: Missouri Valley (AHC/DC)
- 2026–present: Waldorf

Head coaching record
- Overall: 30–56–1
- Tournaments: 0–1 (NAIA playoffs)

Accomplishments and honors

Championships
- 1 HAAC South Division (2021)

David S. Calloway is an American college football coach and former player. He is the head football coach for Waldorf University, a position he has held since 2026. He previously served as the associate head coach and defensive coordinator at Missouri Valley in 2025, the defensive coordinator at Arkansas–Pine Bluff from 2023 to 2024. Calloway served as the head football coach at Texas A&M University–Kingsville from 2013 to 2014 and the head coach at Central Methodist University in Fayette, Missouri from 2016 to 2022.

== Head coaching record ==
Year	Team	Overall	Conference	Standing	Bowl/playoffs	NAIA^{#}
Texas A&M–Kingsville Javelinas (Lone Star Conference) (2013–2014)
2013	Texas A&M–Kingsville	2–8	0–6	7th		
2014	Texas A&M–Kingsville	1–5 (Note: Calloway was fired after the first six games of the 2014 season. Jaime Martinez replaced Calloway as interim head coach and led Texas A&M–Kingsville to a record of 1–4 over the final five games of the season. The Javelinas finished 2–9 overall and 0–7 in Lone Star Conference play, placing eighth.)				
Texas A&M–Kingsville:		3–13	0–6			
Central Methodist Eagles (Heart of America Athletic Conference) (2016–2021)
2016	Central Methodist	2–9	1–4	5th (South)		
2017	Central Methodist	2–9	1–4	T–5th (South)		
2018	Central Methodist	4–6	1–3	T–4th (South)		
2019	Central Methodist	5–5–1	2–3	T–4th (South)		
2020–21	Central Methodist	5–4	3–2	3rd (South)		
2021	Central Methodist	9–3	5–0	1st (South)	L NAIA First Round	16
Central Methodist:		27–36–1	13–16			
Waldorf Warriors (Great Plains Athletic Conference) (2026–present)
2026	Waldorf	0–7	0–7			
Waldorf:		0–7	0–7			
Total:		30–56–1				
National championship Conference title Conference division title or championship game berth
