= Tyler Chapa =

American football coach (born 1994)

Biographical details
- Born: March 6, 1994 (age 32); San Antonio, Texas, U.S.

Playing career
- 2012–2014: Abilene Christian
- 2015: Doane
- Position: Defensive back

Coaching career (HC unless noted)
- 2016: Doane (RB)
- 2017–2018: Doane (DB)
- 2019–2022: Waldorf (DB)
- 2023–2025: Waldorf

Head coaching record
- Overall: 4–27

Tyler Chapa (born March 6, 1994) is an American college football coach. He was the head football coach for Waldorf University from 2023 to 2025. He also coached for Doane. He played college football for Abilene Christian and Doane as a defensive back.

== Coaching career ==
Chapa resigned as Waldorf's head coach in November 2025.

== Personal life ==
On October 3, 2014, Chapa was arrested and indicted with assault by choking following an alleged incident with his girlfriend.

== Head coaching record ==
Year	Team	Overall	Conference	Standing	Bowl/playoffs
Waldorf Warriors (North Star Athletic Association) (2023)
2023	Waldorf	4–6	3–5	3rd	
Waldorf Warriors (Great Plains Athletic Conference) (2024–2025)
2024	Waldorf	0–11	0–10	11th	
2025	Waldorf	0–10	0–10	11th	
Waldorf:		4–27	3–25		
Total:		4–27			
