= Greg Youngblood =

American football coach

Biographical details
- Education: Bates College; College of Santa Fe

Playing career
- c. 1993: Bates
- Position: Strong safety

Coaching career (HC unless noted)
- 1994–1995: Salisbury School (CT) (DC)
- 1996: Bates (WR/TE)
- 1997–1999: Albuquerque Academy HS (NM) (backs)
- 2000–2002: Rio Rancho HS (NM) (DC)
- 2003–2005: West Mesa HS (NM)
- 2005: Taylor (DB)
- 2006: Waldorf (RB/ST)
- 2007–2011: Waldorf
- 2012–2015: Dordt
- 2016–2023: Olivet Nazarene (DC/LB)
- 2024-present: Bishop McNamara HS (MD)

Head coaching record
- Overall: 17–81 (college)

Greg Youngblood is an American college football coach. Youngblood served as the head football coach at Waldorf College in Forest City, Iowa from 2007 until 2011 and at Dordt College in Sioux Center, Iowa from 2012 to 2015.

== Head coaching record ==
Year	Team	Overall	Conference	Standing	Bowl/playoffs
Waldorf Warriors (NAIA independent) (2007–2008)
2007	Waldorf	2–9			
2008	Waldorf	1–10			
Waldorf Warriors (Mid-States Football Association) (2009–2011)
2009	Waldorf	1–9	0–7	8th (MWL)	
2010	Waldorf	3–8	1–6	7th (MWL)	
2011	Waldorf	2–9	0–7	8th (MWL)	
Waldorf:		9–45	1–20		
Dordt Defenders (Great Plains Athletic Conference) (2012–2015)
2012	Dordt	2–9	0–9	10th	
2013	Dordt	2–9	0–9	10th	
2014	Dordt	2–9	1–8	T–9th	
2015	Dordt	2–9	1–8	T–9th	
Dordt:		8–36	2–34		
Total:		17–81			
