= David Bolstorff =

American football coach

Biographical details
- Born: c. 1934 (age 91–92)

Playing career
- c. 1950s: Minnesota
- c. 1955: St. Olaf
- 1958: Orange County Rhinos
- Positions: Guard, fullback, tackle

Coaching career (HC unless noted)
- ?: St. Olaf (assistant)
- ?: Minnehaha Academy (MN) (assistant)
- 1960–1961: Faribault HS (MN) (line)
- 1962: Augustana (SD) (assistant)
- 1965–1967: Waldorf (assistant)
- 1968–2006: Waldorf

Head coaching record
- Overall: 7–35 (college); 182–49–2 (junior college)
- Bowls: 3–1 (junior college)

Accomplishments and honors

Championships
- 2 Iowa Juco (1975, 1993)

David Bolstorff (born c. 1934) is an American former college football coach, chaplain, and professor. He served as the head football coach at Waldorf College—now known as Waldorf University—in Forest City, Iowa from 1968 to 2006, compiling a record of 189–184–2. Bolstorff was also the chaplain and a professor of religion at Waldorf.

Bolstorff was raised in Grand Rapids, Minnesota. He began his college career at the University of Minnesota before transferring to St. Olaf College in Northfield, Minnesota. There he played football as a guard and was named first-team All-Midwest Conference in 1955. He earned a bachelor's degree in religion, history, and philosophy from St. Olaf and a bachelor of divinity from the Lutheran Theological Seminary—now known as Luther Seminary—in Saint Paul, Minnesota.

Bolstorff interned at a parish in California in the late 1950s, during which he played semi-professional football with the Orange County Rhinos of the Pacific Football Conference. With the Rhinos, he played as a fullback, and tackle. After graduating from the seminary in 1960, he was appointed associate pastor at the Faribault Lutheran Church in Faribault, Minnesota. Bolstorff began his coaching career with two years as an assistant at his alma mater, St. Olaf, one year as an assistant at Minnehaha Academy in Minneapolis, and two years as line coach at Faribault High School. In 1962, he was hired as an assistant football coach at Augustana College—now known as Augustana University—in Sioux Falls, South Dakota.

Bolstorff moved to Waldorf in 1965 as the college's first full-time chaplain. He also helped coaching the football team under head coach Robert Bungum. Bolstorff became acting head coach in 1967 when Bungum suffered a heart attack, and succeeded him on a permanent basis the following season.

Bolstorff's older brother, Doug Bolstorff, played college basketball at the University of Minnesota and was the head basketball coach at Macalester College in Saint Paul.

== Head coaching record ==
=== College ===
Year	Team	Overall	Conference	Standing	Bowl/playoffs
Waldorf Warriors (NAIA independent) (2003–2006)
2003	Waldorf	0–11			
2004	Waldorf	3–7			
2005	Waldorf	2–9			
2006	Waldorf	2–8			
Waldorf:		7–35			
Total:		7–35			

=== Junior college football ===
Year	Team	Overall	Conference	Standing	Bowl/playoffs
Waldorf Warriors () (1968–1969)
1968	Waldorf				
1969	Waldorf				
Waldorf Warriors (Iowa Junior College Conference / Iowa Community College Athletic Conference) (1970–2002)
1970	Waldorf	4–3	0–0	NA	
1971	Waldorf	4–4–1	3–2–1	3rd	
1972	Waldorf	5–5	3–3	4th	
1973	Waldorf	5–1	1–4	5th	
1974	Waldorf	7–2	4–2	2nd	
1975	Waldorf	9–0	7–0	1st	
1976	Waldorf	5–4	3–3	3rd	
1977	Waldorf	5–5	5–4	3rd	
1978	Waldorf	5–4	4–4	3rd	
1979	Waldorf				
1980	Waldorf	3–6–1	3–5	4th	
1981	Waldorf	6–3	4–2	2nd	
1982	Waldorf	2–7	1–5	4th	
1983	Waldorf	4–5	2–4	3rd	
1984	Waldorf	7–3	2–2	3rd	
1985	Waldorf	4–5	2–4	3rd	
1986	Waldorf	7–2	2–2	2nd	
1987	Waldorf	7–3	2–2	T–2nd	
1988	Waldorf	5–4	1–3	4th	
1989	Waldorf	5–5	3–2	T–2nd	L RC Cola Bowl
1990	Waldorf	4–5	2–3	4th	
1991	Waldorf				
1992	Waldorf				
1993	Waldorf	8–2	5–1	T–1st	W RC Cola Bowl
1994	Waldorf				W RC Cola Bowl
1995	Waldorf	6–3	4–2	T–2nd	
1996	Waldorf	3–7	1–4	5th	
1997	Waldorf	8–3	3–1	2nd	W Pepsi Cola Bowl
1998	Waldorf	5–5	4–4	3rd	
1999	Waldorf	2–8	2–6	T–4th	
2000	Waldorf	4–6	3–5	T–4th	
2001	Waldorf	3–8	2–6	T–4th	
2002	Waldorf	0–11	0–8	5th	
Waldorf:		182–49–2			
Total:		182–49–2			
National championship Conference title Conference division title or championship game berth
