= Chuck Hepola =

American football coach and athletics administrator

Current position
- Title: Athletic director, head coach
- Team: Evangel
- Conference: KCAC
- Record: 75–39

Biographical details
- Education: Evangel University (1991); Drury University (2002)

Playing career

Baseball
- c. late 1980s: Evangel

Coaching career (HC unless noted)

Football
- 2000: Logan-Rogersville HS (MO)
- 2001: Willard HS (MO) (DC)
- 2002: Hillcrest HS (MO) (DC)
- 2003–2004: Tulsa (QB)
- 2005–2008: East Central (OC/QB)
- 2009: Louisiana–Monroe (operations)
- 2010: Nicholls State (RB/RC)
- 2011: Nicholls State (AHC/RB/RC)
- 2012–2013: Nicholls State (assoc. HC / RB / RC)
- 2014: Nicholls State (assoc. HC / STC / RB)
- 2015: Evangel (STC/RC/QB)
- 2016–present: Evangel

Administrative career (AD unless noted)
- 2025–present: Evangel

Head coaching record
- Overall: 75–39 (college)
- Tournaments: 0–2 (NAIA playoffs)

Accomplishments and honors

Championships
- HAAC South Division (2017); 2× KCAC Kessinger Division (2023, 2025)

Awards
- 2× HAAC South Division Coach of the Year (2017–2018); 2× KCAC Coach of the Year (2023, 2025); AFCA NAIA Region 3 Coach of the Year (2023)

Chuck Hepola is an American football coach and athletic director. He has served as athletic director at Evangel University since 2025 and as the school's head football coach since 2016. Hepola is the winningest head football coach in Evangel history, compiling a 75–39 record.

A graduate of Evangel, Hepola began his coaching career at the high school level in Missouri, as an assistant football coach at Logan-Rogersville High School in Rogersville, Willard High School in Willard, and Hillcrest High School in Springfield. He was then an assistant coach the University of Tulsa, East Central University in Ada, Oklahoma, the University of Louisiana at Monroe, and Nicholls State University in Thibodaux, Louisiana.

== Early life and education ==
Hepola grew up in Tulsa, Oklahoma and attended Evangel University. He was a four-year member of the school's baseball team where he earned three varsity letters and served as team captain during his senior season. He graduated with a bachelor's degree in education in 1991.

== Coaching career ==
Hepola was the head football coach for Logan-Rogersville High School in 2000. He then served as the defensive coordinator for Willard High School and Hillcrest High School.

Hepola's first college football coaching position was as the quarterbacks coach for Tulsa. After two seasons, he was hired as the offensive coordinator and quarterbacks coach for East Central.

In 2009, Hepola was hired as the director of football operations at Louisiana–Monroe. In 2010, he joined Nicholls State where he spent five seasons in various roles, including assistant head coach, special teams coordinator, running backs coach, and recruiting coordinator. During his tenure at Nicholls State, Hepola was named a finalist for the American Football Coaches Association Assistant Coach of the Year award twice. He also coached six All-Southland Conference players.

In 2015, Hepola was hired by his alma mater, Evangel, as the team's special teams coordinator, recruiting coordinator, and quarterbacks coach. On March 2, 2016, Hepola was appointed interim head football coach following the departure of Brenton Illum. On March 22, 2016, he was formally named head coach.

On October 26, 2026, Hepola announced his plans to step down following the season.

== Administrative career ==
Hepola was appointed athletic director at Evangel University in January 2025.

== Personal life and education ==
Hepola is married to Kirstin, and the couple has two children. Hepola later earned a master's degree in education from Drury University in 2002.

== Head coaching record ==
=== College ===
Year	Team	Overall	Conference	Standing	Bowl/playoffs	NAIA Coaches'^{#}
Evangel Valor (Heart of America Athletic Conference) (2016–2022)
2016	Evangel	4–7	2–3	4th (South)		
2017	Evangel	7–4	4–1	T–1st (South)		25
2018	Evangel	9–2	2–2	T–2nd (South)		17
2019	Evangel	8–3	3–2	T–2nd (South)		20
2020–21	Evangel	2–5	1–3	5th (South)		
2021	Evangel	5–6	2–3	4th (South)		
2022	Evangel	7–3	4–1	2nd (South)		
Evangel Valor (Kansas Collegiate Athletic Conference) (2023–present)
2023	Evangel	11–1	5–0	1st (Kessinger)	L NAIA First Round	9
2024	Evangel	8–2	3–2	T–3rd		
2025	Evangel	9–3	5–0	1st (Kessinger)	L NAIA First Round	19
2026	Evangel	5–3	1–1	(Kessinger)		
Evangel:		75–39	32–18			
Total:		75–39				
National championship Conference title Conference division title or championship game berth
