= 2026 NAIA football season =

American college football season

- Total No. of teams: 96
- Regular season: August 27 – November 14, 2026
- Postseason: November 21 – December 19, 2026
- National Championship: Crowley ISD Multi-Purpose Stadium; Fort Worth, TX; December 19, 2026

The 2026 NAIA football season is the component of the 2026 college football season organized by the National Association of Intercollegiate Athletics (NAIA) in the United States.

The regular season will begin on August 27 and will culminate on November 14.

The playoffs, known as the NAIA Football National Championship, will begin on November 21 and culminate with the championship game on December 19 at Crowley ISD Multi-Purpose Stadium in Fort Worth, Texas.

== Membership changes ==
School	Former conference	New conference	Ref
Andrew Fighting Tigers	Independent (NJCAA)	Independent	
Faulkner Eagles	Mid-South	Independent	
Mount Mercy Mustangs	New program	Heart of America	
Saint Mary-of-the-Woods Pomeroys	MSFL (Sprint football)	Mid-States	
Siena Heights Saints	Mid-States	School closed	

== Conference standings ==
2026 Appalachian Athletic Conference football standings
	Conf.			Overall
Team	W		L	W		L
Pikeville	5	–	0	8	–	2
Reinhardt	5	–	0	6	–	4
Union Commonwealth	3	–	2	3	–	6
Bluefield	2	–	3	4	–	6
Kentucky Christian	2	–	3	3	–	7
Point	1	–	4	1	–	7
Rio Grande	0	–	6	0	–	10
$ – Conference champion; ^ – NAIA playoff participant; As of November 7, 2026; Rankings from NAIA Coaches' Poll; Source: Appalachian Athletic Conference

2026 Frontier Conference football standings
	Conf.			Overall
Team	W		L	W		L
East Division
No. 5 Montana Tech x	5	–	0	9	–	1
Rocky Mountain	4	–	1	5	–	4
Dickinson State	4	–	2	5	–	6
Dakota State	2	–	3	6	–	4
Mayville State	2	–	3	6	–	4
Valley City State	1	–	4	2	–	7
Montana State–Northern	0	–	5	0	–	10
West Division
No. 1 College of Idaho x	5	–	0	9	–	0
No. 14 Carroll (MT)	4	–	1	7	–	2
Eastern Oregon	4	–	1	7	–	2
Southern Oregon	2	–	3	3	–	6
Montana Western	2	–	4	4	–	6
Simpson (CA)	1	–	4	3	–	6
Arizona Christian	0	–	5	0	–	9
x – Division champion/co-champions; ^ – NAIA playoff participant; As of November 7, 2026; Rankings from NAIA NSC Poll; Source: Frontier Conference

2026 Great Plains Athletic Conference football standings
	Conf.			Overall
Team	W		L	W		L
No. 12 Northwestern (IA)	8	–	1	8	–	2
No. 11 Dordt	8	–	1	8	–	2
No. 4 Morningside	8	–	1	9	–	1
Midland	7	–	2	8	–	2
Concordia (NE)	5	–	4	5	–	4
Hastings	4	–	5	4	–	5
Dakota Wesleyan	4	–	5	4	–	6
Mount Marty	3	–	6	4	–	6
Doane	2	–	7	3	–	7
Briar Cliff	1	–	8	1	–	9
Waldorf	0	–	10	0	–	10
$ – Conference champion; ^ – NAIA playoff participant; As of November 7, 2026; Rankings from NAIA NSC Poll; Source: GPAC

2026 Heart of America Athletic Conference football standings
	Conf.			Overall
Team	W		L	W		L
North
No. 8 Grand View	6	–	0	9	–	1
St. Ambrose	5	–	1	6	–	3
William Penn	4	–	2	7	–	3
Culver–Stockton	3	–	3	4	–	6
Peru State	3	–	3	3	–	6
Graceland	2	–	4	3	–	7
Mount Mercy	1	–	5	1	–	9
Clarke	0	–	6	0	–	10
South
No. 3 Benedictine (KS) x	6	–	0	10	–	1
Baker	4	–	1	8	–	1
MidAmerica Nazarene	3	–	2	6	–	4
William Woods	2	–	3	5	–	5
Missouri Valley	2	–	3	4	–	5
Central Methodist	1	–	4	3	–	7
Missouri Baptist	0	–	5	2	–	7
x – Division champion/co-champions; ^ – NAIA playoff participant; As of November 7, 2026; Rankings from NAIA NSC Poll; Source: HAAC

2026 Kansas Collegiate Athletic Conference football standings
	Conf.			Overall
Team	W		L	W		L
Bissell Division
No. 13 Southwestern (KS)	4	–	0	9	–	1
No. 15 Friends	3	–	1	9	–	1
Kansas Wesleyan	2	–	1	6	–	4
McPherson	1	–	2	8	–	2
Sterling	1	–	3	3	–	7
Saint Mary (KS)	0	–	4	0	–	10
Kessinger Division
Ottawa (KS)	4	–	0	7	–	3
Evangel	3	–	1	7	–	3
Avila	2	–	2	4	–	6
Tabor	2	–	2	4	–	6
Bethel (KS)	1	–	3	2	–	8
Bethany (KS)	0	–	4	1	–	9
x – Division champion/co-champions; ^ – NAIA playoff participant; As of November 7, 2026; Rankings from NAIA NSC Poll; Source: KCAC

2026 Mid-South Conference football standings
	Conf.			Overall
Team	W		L	W		L
No. 10 Campbellsville	4	–	1	8	–	1
No. 9 Lindsey Wilson	3	–	1	8	–	2
Georgetown (KY)	3	–	2	5	–	4
Cumberlands (KY)	2	–	2	6	–	3
Cumberland (TN)	2	–	3	6	–	4
Bethel (TN)	0	–	4	2	–	7
$ – Conference champion; ^ – NAIA playoff participant; As of November 7, 2026; Rankings from NAIA NSC Poll; Source: MSC

2026 Mid-States Football Association standings
	Conf.			Overall
Team	W		L	W		L
Mideast League
No. 7 Indiana Wesleyan x	4	–	0	9	–	1
Taylor	3	–	1	8	–	2
Saint Francis (IN)	3	–	1	7	–	3
Lawrence Tech	2	–	2	5	–	5
Defiance	0	–	4	3	–	7
Madonna	0	–	4	3	–	7
Midwest League
No. 6 Marian (IN) x	4	–	0	9	–	1
Olivet Nazarene	3	–	1	6	–	3
Saint Xavier	3	–	1	5	–	5
St. Francis (IL)	1	–	3	2	–	8
Saint Mary-of-the-Woods	1	–	3	1	–	8
Judson	0	–	4	0	–	10
x – League champion/co-champions ^ – NAIA playoff participant; As of November 7, 2026; Rankings from NAIA NSC Poll; Source: MSFA Mideast MSFA Midwest

2026 Sooner Athletic Conference football standings
	Conf.			Overall
Team	W		L	W		L
Louisiana Christian	7	–	0	9	–	1
OUAZ	6	–	1	7	–	2
Wayland Baptist	6	–	1	7	–	2
Texas Wesleyan	5	–	2	5	–	5
OK Panhandle State	3	–	4	5	–	5
Nelson	2	–	5	2	–	8
Arkansas Baptist	2	–	6	2	–	9
Langston	1	–	6	2	–	7
Texas College	0	–	7	0	–	8
$ – Conference champion; ^ – NAIA playoff participant; As of November 7, 2026; Rankings from NAIA NSC Poll; Source: SAC

2026 Sun Conference football standings
	Conf.			Overall
Team	W		L	W		L
No. 2 St. Thomas (FL) $	6	–	0	10	–	0
Southeastern	4	–	2	7	–	2
Keiser	4	–	2	6	–	3
Ave Maria	4	–	2	6	–	4
Florida Memorial	3	–	3	5	–	5
Warner	3	–	3	4	–	6
Webber International	0	–	6	2	–	8
Thomas	0	–	6	1	–	9
$ – Conference champion; ^ – NAIA playoff participant; As of November 7, 2026; Rankings from NAIA NSC Poll; Source: Sun

2026 NAIA independents football records
	Conf.			Overall
Team	W		L	W		L
Faulkner		–		6	–	4
Andrew		–		0	–	9

== Postseason ==
=== Teams ===
==== Automatic bids (13) ====
Automatic bids
Conference		School	Record	Appearance	Last
Appalachian		Reinhardt	7–4	11th	2025
Frontier	East Division	Montana Tech	10–1	13th	2025
Frontier	West Division	College of Idaho	11–0	4th	2025
Great Plains		Morningside	10–1	23rd	2025
Heart of America	North Division	Grand View	10–1	15th	2025
Heart of America	South Division	Benedictine (KS)	10–1	18th	2025
KCAC	Bissell Division	Southwestern (KS)	10–1	9th	2024
KCAC	Kessinger Division	Ottawa	8–3	11th	2023
Mid-South		Lindsey Wilson	9–2	10th	2025
Mid-States	Mideast League	Indiana Wesleyan	10–1	6th	2025
Mid-States	Midwest League	Marian	10–1	14th	2025
Sooner		Louisiana Christian	10–1	2nd	2023
Sun		St. Thomas	11–0	4th	2025

==== At-large bids (7) ====
At-large bids
School	Conference	Record	Appearance	Last
Campbellsville	Mid-South	8–1	6th	2025
Dordt	Great Plains	9–2	4th	2025
Friends	KCAC	10–1	7th	2025
Baker	Heart of America	9–1	22nd	2024
Midland	Great Plains	9–2	4th	1994
Eastern Oregon	Frontier	8–2	4th	2016
Northwestern (IA)	Great Plains	8–3	27th	2024

=== Bracket ===
First Round; November 21; Campus sites
13	Friends	28
18	Northwestern (IA)	16
14	Baker	28
19	Ottawa (KS) (OT)	31
15	Louisiana Christian	76
20	Reinhardt	28
17	Eastern Oregon	28
16	Midland	20

Second Round; November 28; Campus sites
6	Morningside
11	Dordt
3	Benedictine (KS)
13	Friends
8	Grand View
9	Lindsey Wilson
1	College of Idaho
19	Ottawa (KS)
7	Indiana Wesleyan
10	Campbellsville
2	St. Thomas
15	Louisiana Christian
5	Marian
12	Southwestern (KS)
4	Montana Tech
17	Eastern Oregon

Quarterfinals; December 5 Campus sites

Semifinals; December 12; Campus sites

Championship; December 19; Crowley ISD Multi-Purpose Stadium; Fort Worth, Texas

== Coaching changes ==
=== Preseason and in-season ===
This is restricted to coaching changes that took place on or after May 1, 2026, and will include any changes announced after a team's last regularly scheduled games but before its playoff games.

School	Outgoing coach	Date	Reason	Replacement	Previous position
Point	Nigel Lawrence	October 22, 2026	Fired	Kelvin Kelley	Point associate head coach and special teams coordinator (2025–2026)

=== End of season ===
This list includes coaching changes announced during the season that did not take effect until the end of the season.

School	Outgoing coach	Date	Reason	Replacement	Previous position
Evangel	Chuck Hepola	October 26, 2026	Resigned (effective at season's end)		

== See also ==
- 2026 NCAA Division I FBS football season
- 2026 NCAA Division I FCS football season
- 2026 NCAA Division II football season
- 2026 NCAA Division III football season
- 2026 U Sports football season
- 2026 junior college football season
- 2026 NAIA flag football season
