= Christopher Douglas =

Christopher or Chris Douglas may refer to:

- Christopher Douglas (American actor) (born 1969), American actor and host of television mini-series Feeding Frenzy on Animal Planet
- Christopher Douglas (British actor), British actor and writer
- Chris Douglas (musician) (born 1974), musician from San Francisco
- Chris Douglas (cricketer) (born 1989), cricketer from Bermuda
- Chris Douglas (American football), American football coach
- Chris Douglas (sledge hockey), American ice sled hockey player
- Chris Douglas (hurdler) (born 1997), Australian hurdler, 2019 All-American for the Iowa Hawkeyes track and field team

== See also ==
- Chris Douglas-Roberts (born 1987), American basketball player
