= Kent Anderson =

Kent Anderson may refer to:

- Kent Anderson (novelist) (born 1945), American author
- Kent Anderson (baseball) (born 1963), American baseball player
- Kent Anderson (American football), American football coach and player
