= 2022 NAIA football rankings =

Rankings for the 2022 NAIA football season

- Season: 2022
- Postseason: Single-elimination
- National champions: Northwestern (IA)
- Runner up: Keiser

The 2022 National Association of Intercollegiate Athletics (NAIA) football rankings are conducted on a week-to-week basis, starting after week three.

== Legend ==
	Increase in ranking
	Decrease in ranking
	Not ranked previous week or no change
	Selected for NAIA playoffs
(#–#)	Win–loss record
(Italics)	Number of first place votes
т	Tied with team above or below also with this symbol

== NAIA Coaches' poll ==
	Preseason August 1	Week 1 September 12	Week 2 September 19	Week 3 September 26	Week 4 October 3	Week 5 October 10	Week 6 October 17	Week 7 October 24	Week 8 October 31	Week 9 November 7	Final November 13	
1.	Morningside (19)	Morningside (2–0) (19)	Morningside (3–0) (19)	Morningside (3–0) (18)	Morningside (4–0) (19)	Morningside (5–0) (19)	Morningside (6–0) (19)	Morningside (7–0) (19)	Morningside (8–0) (19)	Morningside (9–0) (19)	Morningside (10–0) (19)	1.
2.	Grand View	Grand View (3–0)	Grand View (4–0)	Grand View (5–0)	Grand View (6–0)	Grand View (6–0)	Grand View (7–0)	Grand View (8–0)	Grand View (9–0)	Grand View (10–0)	Grand View (11–0)	2.
3.	Northwestern (IA)	Lindsey Wilson (2–0)	Lindsey Wilson (3–0)	Lindsey Wilson (4–0)	Lindsey Wilson (5–0)	Lindsey Wilson (5–0)	Lindsey Wilson (6–0)	Lindsey Wilson (7–0)	Northwestern (IA) (7–1)	Northwestern (IA) (8–1)	Northwestern (IA) (9–1)	3.
4.	Lindsey Wilson	Northwestern (IA) (1–1)	Northwestern (IA) (2–1)	Northwestern (IA) (3–1)	Northwestern (IA) (4–1)	Northwestern (IA) (4–1)	Northwestern (IA) (5–1)	Northwestern (IA) (6–1)	Bethel (TN) (9–0)	Bethel (TN) (10–0)	Bethel (TN) (11–0)	4.
5.	Marian (IN)	Marian (IN) (1–0)	Marian (IN) (2–0)	Marian (IN) (3–0)	Marian (IN) (4–0)	Indiana Wesleyan (4–1)	Indiana Wesleyan (5–1)	Indiana Wesleyan (6–1)	Indiana Wesleyan (7–1)	Indiana Wesleyan (8–1)	Indiana Wesleyan (9–1)	5.
6.	Concordia (MI)	Southwestern (KS) (2–0)	Southwestern (KS) (3–0)	Southwestern (KS) (4–0)	Southwestern (KS) (5–0)	Bethel (TN) (6–0)	Bethel (TN) (7–0)	Bethel (TN) (8–0)	Benedictine (KS) (8–1)	Benedictine (KS) (9–1)	Benedictine (KS) (9–1)	6.
7.	Keiser	Concordia (MI) (1–1)	OUAZ (3–0)	OUAZ (4–0)	Indiana Wesleyan (3–1)	College of Idaho (6–0)	College of Idaho (6–0)	Benedictine (KS) (7–1)	Marian (IN) (6–1)	Marian (IN) (7–1)	Marian (IN) (9–1)	7.
8.	Southwestern (KS)	OUAZ (2–0)	Georgetown (KY) (3–0)	Georgetown (KY) (4–0)	Bethel (TN) (5–0)	Benedictine (KS) (5–1)	Benedictine (KS) (6–1)	Marian (IN) (6–1)	Lindsey Wilson (7–1)	Lindsey Wilson (8–1)	Lindsey Wilson (9–1)	8.
9.	Reinhardt	Kansas Wesleyan (2–0)	Reinhardt (2–1)	Indiana Wesleyan (2–1)	College of Idaho (5–0)	Bethel (KS) (6–0)	Marian (IN) (5–1)	Reinhardt (5–1)	Reinhardt (6–1)	Reinhardt (7–1)	Reinhardt (8–1)	9.
10.	OUAZ	Georgetown (KY) (2–0)	Indiana Wesleyan (1–1)	Reinhardt (3–1)	Benedictine (KS) (5–1)	Marian (IN) (4–1)	Reinhardt (5–1)	Southwestern (KS) (6–1)	Southwestern (KS) (7–1)	Southwestern (KS) (8–1)	Southwestern (KS) (9–1)	10.
11.	Saint Xavier	Baker (KS) (2–1)	College of Idaho (2–0)	College of Idaho (4–0)	Reinhardt (3–1)	Reinhardt (4–1)	Georgetown (KY) (5–1)	Saint Xavier (6–2)	Saint Xavier (7–2)	College of Idaho (8–1)	Saint Xavier (9–2)	11.
12.	Kansas Wesleyan	Reinhardt (1–1)	Benedictine (KS) (2–1)	Benedictine (KS) (4–1)	Bethel (KS) (5–0)	Georgetown (KY) (5–1)	Southwestern (KS) (6–1)	College of Idaho (6–1)	College of Idaho (7–1)	Saint Xavier (8–2)	Keiser (7–3)	12.
13.	Baker (KS)	Indiana Wesleyan (0–1)	Bethel (TN) (3–0)	Bethel (TN) (4–0)	Georgetown (KY) (4–1)	Southwestern (KS) (5–1)	OUAZ (5–1)	Bethel (KS) (7–1)	Bethel (KS) (8–1)	Bethel (KS) (9–1)	Avila (10–1)	13.
14.	Indiana Wesleyan	Keiser (1–2)	Bethel (KS) (3–0)	Bethel (KS) (4–0)	OUAZ (4–1)	OUAZ (5–1)	Rocky Mountain (5–1)	Midland (NE) (7–1)	Keiser (6–3)	Keiser (6–3)	Bethel (KS) (9–1)	14.
15.	Georgetown (KY)	Benedictine (KS) (2–1)	Concordia (MI) (1–2)	Concordia (MI) (1–2)	Kansas Wesleyan (4–1)	Rocky Mountain (5–1)	Saint Xavier (5–2)	Roosevelt (6–1)	Midland (NE) (8–1)	Avila (9–1)	St. Thomas (FL) (9–2)	15.
16.	Dickinson State	Bethel (TN) (3–0)	Saint Francis (IN) (2–0)	Kansas Wesleyan (3–1)	St. Thomas (FL) (4–1)	Saint Xavier (4–2)	Bethel (KS) (6–1)	Keiser (5–3)	Roosevelt (7–1)	Georgetown (KY) (7–2)	Carroll (8–2)	16.
17.	Montana Western	College of Idaho (2–0)	Montana Western (3–1)	Midland (NE) (5–0)	Rocky Mountain (4–1)	Midland (NE) (6–1)	Midland (NE) (6–1)	Avila (7–1)	Avila (8–1)	St. Thomas (FL) (8–2)	Dickinson State (8–2)	17.
18.	Central Methodist	Texas Wesleyan (3–0)	Kansas Wesleyan (2–1)	Roosevelt (3–0)	Saint Xavier (3–2)	Roosevelt (4–1)	Roosevelt (5–1)	Georgetown (KY) (5–2)	Georgetown (KY) (6–2)	Dickinson State (7–2)	College of Idaho (8–2)	18.
19.	Rocky Mountain	Montana Western (2–1)	Midland (NE) (4–0)	St. Thomas (FL) (4–1)	Montana Tech (4–1)	Texas Wesleyan (5–1)	Keiser (4–3)	St. Thomas (FL) (6–2)	St. Thomas (FL) (7–2)	St. Francis (IL) (7–2)	OUAZ (7–2)	19.
20.	Arizona Christian	Saint Francis (IN) (1–0)	Roosevelt (2–0)	Rocky Mountain (3–1)	Midland (NE) (5–1)	Keiser (3–3) т	Texas Wesleyan (6–1)	OUAZ (5–2)	Montana Tech (6–2)	OUAZ (6–2)	Arizona Christian (8–2)	20.
21.	Dordt	Montana Tech (2–0)	Southeastern (4–0)	Montana Tech (3–1)	Langston (5–0)	Langston (5–0) т	Avila (6–1)	Dickinson State (5–2)	Dickinson State (6–2)	Carroll (7–2)	Georgetown (KY) (7–3)	21.
22.	Culver–Stockton	Bethel (KS) (2–0)	St. Thomas (FL) (2–1)	Saint Francis (IN) (2–1)	Roosevelt (3–1)	Waldorf (6–1)	St. Thomas (FL) (5–2)	Langston (6–1)	OUAZ (5–2)	Arizona Christian (7–2)	Texas Wesleyan (9–2)	22.
23.	Bethel (KS)	Midland (NE) (3–0)	Baker (KS) (2–2)	Saint Xavier (2–2)	Texas Wesleyan (4–1)	St. Thomas (FL) (4–2)	Dickinson State (5–2)	Montana Tech (5–2)	Carroll (6–2)	Midland (NE) (8–2)	St. Francis (IL) (7–3)	23.
24.	Faulkner	Southeastern (3–0)	Waldorf (4–0)	Carroll (3–1)	Waldorf (5–1)	Avila (5–1)	Montana Tech (4–2)	Rocky Mountain (5–2)	Arizona Christian (6–2)	Roosevelt (7–2)	Montana Tech (7–3)	24.
25.	St. Francis (IL)	St. Thomas (FL) (1–1)	Rocky Mountain (2–1)	Langston (4–0)	Keiser (2–3)	Montana Tech (4–2)	Kansas Wesleyan (5–2) т Arizona Christian (4–2) т	Carroll (5–2)	St. Francis (IL) (6–2)	Kansas Wesleyan (8–2)	Dordt (7–3)	25.
	Preseason August 1	Week 1 September 12	Week 2 September 19	Week 3 September 26	Week 4 October 3	Week 5 October 10	Week 6 October 17	Week 7 October 24	Week 8 October 31	Week 9 November 7	Final November 13	
		Dropped: Saint Xavier (0–2); Saint Francis (IN) (0–2); Rocky Mountain (1–1); Arizona Christian (1–1); Dordt (1–1); Faulkner (1–1); St. Francis (IL) (0–1)	Dropped: Keiser (1–3); Texas Wesleyan (3–1); Montana Tech (2–1)	Dropped: Montana Western (3–2); Southeastern (3–1); Waldorf (4–1)	Dropped: Concordia (MI) (1–3); Carroll (3–2)	Dropped: Kansas Wesleyan (4–2)	Dropped: Langston (5–1)	Dropped: Arizona Christian (5–2); Kansas Wesleyan (6–2)	Dropped: Rocky Mountain (5–3); Langston (6–2)	Dropped: Montana Tech (6–3)	Dropped: Midland (NE) (8–3); Kansas Wesleyan (8–3); Roosevelt (7–3)	
