= 2022 Northwestern Red Raiders football team =

American college football season

2022 Northwestern Red Raiders football

NAIA champion

NAIA Championship Game, W 35–25 vs. Keiser
- Conference: Great Plains Athletic Conference
- Record: 13–1 (9–1 GPAC)
- Head coach: Matt McCarty (7th season)
- Offensive coordinator: Jake Menage (1st season)
- Defensive coordinator: Billy Kirch (7th season)
- Home stadium: Korver Field at De Valois Stadium

2022 Great Plains Athletic Conference football standings
	Conf.			Overall
Team	W		L	W		L
No. 1 Morningside $^	10	–	0	11	–	1
No. 3 Northwestern (IA) ^	9	–	1	13	–	1
Midland	7	–	3	8	–	3
No. 25 Dordt	7	–	3	7	–	3
Hastings	6	–	4	7	–	4
Concordia (NE)	4	–	6	4	–	6
Doane	4	–	6	4	–	6
Jamestown	3	–	7	4	–	7
Mount Marty	2	–	8	3	–	8
Dakota Wesleyan	2	–	8	2	–	9
Briar Cliff	1	–	9	1	–	10
$ – Conference champion; ^ – NAIA playoff participant; Rankings from NAIA Coaches' Poll

The 2022 Northwestern Red Raiders football team represented Northwestern College as a member of the Great Plains Athletic Conference during the 2022 NAIA football season. Led by seventh-year head coach Matt McCarty, the Red Raiders compiled an overall record of 13–1 with a mark of 9–1 in conference play, placing second in the GPAC.

Northwestern (IA) beat Dickinson State in the first round, Marian (IN) in the quarterfinals, and Indiana Wesleyan in the seminfinals before playing in the 2022 NAIA Football National Championship where they played Keiser and won 35–25 to secure the school's third-overall title. Northwestern (IA) played home games at Korver Field at De Valois Stadium in Orange City, Iowa.

== Schedule ==
Date	Time	Opponent	Rank	Site	Result	Attendance	Source
September 3	7:00 p.m.	at No. 1 Morningside	No. 3	Elwood Olsen Stadium; Sioux City, IA	L 29–30	9,024	
September 10	1:00 p.m.	Dakota Wesleyan	No. 4	De Valois Stadium; Orange City, IA	W 54–7	0	
September 17	1:00 p.m.	at Jamestown	No. 4	Hansen Stadium; Jamestown, ND	W 48–3	0	
September 24	1:00 p.m.	Concordia (NE)	No. 4	De Valois Stadium; Orange City, IA	W 34–10	0	
October 1	1:30 p.m.	Mount Marty^{†}	No. 4	De Valois Stadium; Orange City, IA	W 52–8	0	
October 15	1:00 p.m.	Dordt	No. 4	Open Space Park; Sioux Center, IA	W 23–0	0	
October 22	12:00 p.m.	at Doane	No. 4	Memorial Stadium; Crete, NE	W 59–10	600	
October 29	1:00 p.m.	Briar Cliff	No. 4	De Valois Stadium; Orange City, IA	W 56–7	0	
November 5	1:00 p.m.	No. 15 Midland	No. 3	De Valois Stadium; Orange City, IA	W 42–10	0	
November 12	1:00 p.m.	at Hastings	No. 3	Lloyd Wilson Field; Hastings, NE	W 41–10	0	
November 19	12:00 p.m.	No. 17 Dickinson State*	No. 3	De Valois Stadium; Orange City, IA (NAIA First Round)	W 49–7	0	
November 26	12:00 p.m.	No. 7 Marian (IN)*	No. 3	De Valois Stadium; Orange City, IA (NAIA Quarterfinal)	W 52–27	0	
December 3	12:00 p.m.	No. 5 Indiana Wesleyan*	No. 3	De Valois Stadium; Orange City, IA (NAIA Semifinal)	W 38–7	0	
December 17	12:00 p.m.	No. 12 Keiser*	No. 3	Durham County Memorial Stadium; Durham, NC (NAIA Championship Game)	W 35–25	0	
*Non-conference game; ^{†}Homecoming; Rankings from NAIA Coaches' Poll released prior to the game; All times are in Eastern Standard time

== Coaching staff ==
Northwestern Red Raiders
Name	Position	Consecutive season at Northwestern (IA) in current position	Previous position	NWC profile
Matt McCarty	Head coach	7th	Northwestern (IA) – Assistant head coach / defensive coordinator (2012–2015)	
Jake Menage	Offensive coordinator	1st	Northern Illinois – Wide receivers / tight ends (2019–2021)	
Billy Kirch	Defensive coordinator / safeties	7th	Northwestern (IA) – Safeties (2015)	
Brett Moser	Defensive line	1st	Northwestern (IA) – Graduate assistant (2021)	
Brad Zeutenhorst	Linebackers	26th	N/A	
Ross Fernstrum	Defensive line	11th	N/A	
Brice Byker	Wide receivers	8th	N/A	
Gabe Davis	Tight ends	6th	LeMars Community High School – Assistant (2003–2015)	
Benji Kasel	Running backs	3rd	West Sioux High School – Assistant (2016–2019)	
Levi Letsche	Offensive line	2nd	N/A	
Sam Rall	Quarterbacks	3rd	Northwestern (IA) – Graduate assistant (2016)	
