= Casey Creehan =

American gridiron football coach

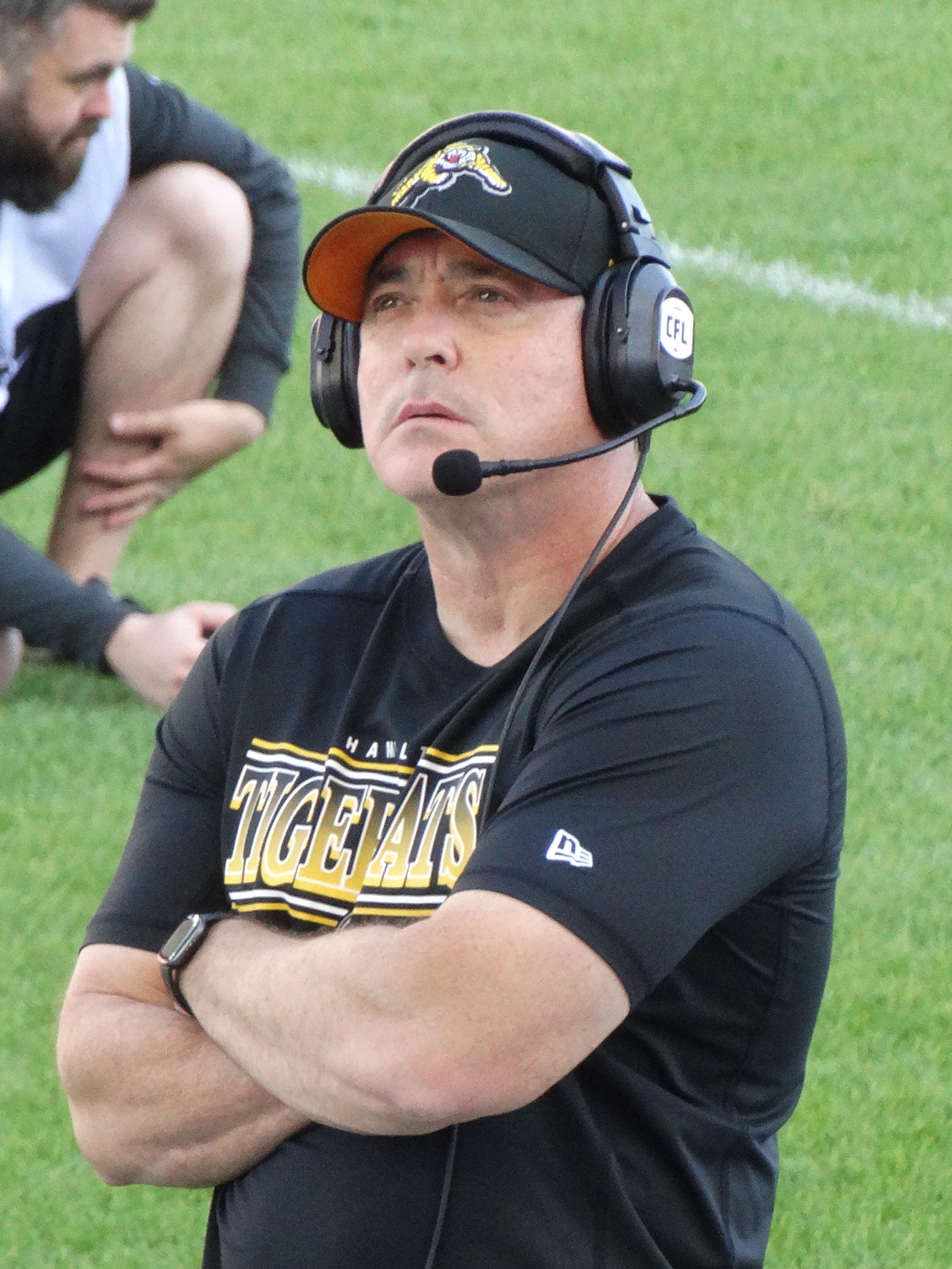
- Creehan with the Hamilton Tiger-Cats in 2025

Hamilton Tiger-Cats
- Title: Defensive line coach

Career information
- Position: Linebacker
- College: Grove City (1997–1998)

Career history
- 1999: Lehigh (defensive assistant)
- 2000: Southern Illinois (TE)
- 2001–2002: Clarion (LB/ST/S&C)
- 2003: James Madison (DE)
- 2004–2007: Calgary Stampeders (DL)
- 2008: Montreal Alouettes (LB)
- 2009: Eastern Michigan (DL)
- 2010–2011: Winnipeg Blue Bombers (DL/LB)
- 2012: Hamilton Tiger-Cats (DC/DL)
- 2013: Winnipeg Blue Bombers (DC/DL/LB)
- 2014–2015: Toronto Argonauts (DC/DL/LB)
- 2016–2017: Edmonton Eskimos (DL)
- 2018–2019: Lyon
- 2020–2021: Peru State
- 2022: Hamilton Tiger-Cats (OA/STA)
- 2023: Concord (DC)
- 2024: Missouri Valley
- 2025–present: Hamilton Tiger-Cats (DL)

Head coaching record
- Regular season: 23–22 (.511)

Casey Creehan is an American gridiron football coach who is the defensive line coach for the Hamilton Tiger-Cats of the Canadian Football League (CFL). Creehan served as the head football coach at Lyon College in Batesville, Arkansas from 2018 to 2019, Peru State College in Peru, Nebraska from 2020 to 2021, and Missouri Valley College in Marshall, Missouri in 2024. He has also been assistant coach with several teams in the CFL and as a defensive coordinator for Concord University.

== Coaching career ==
On March 18, 2025, it was announced that Creehan had joined the coaching staff for the Hamilton Tiger-Cats where he was named the team's defensive line coach.

== Head coaching record ==
Year	Team	Overall	Conference	Standing	Bowl/playoffs
Lyon Scots (Sooner Athletic Conference) (2018–2019)
2018	Lyon	4–7	2–6	T–7th	
2019	Lyon	7–3	6–2	T–3rd	
Lyon:		11–10	8–8		
Peru State Bobcats (Heart of America Athletic Conference) (2020–2021)
2020–21	Peru State	1–2	0–0	3rd (North)	
2021	Peru State	7–4	3–2	3rd	
Peru State:		8–6	3–2		
Missouri Valley Vikings (Heart of America Athletic Conference) (2024)
2024	Missouri Valley	4–6	2–4	5th (South)	
Missouri Valley:		4–6	2–4		
Total:		23–22			

== Personal life ==
Creehan is the son of Dennis Creehan.
