= Doug Bolstorff =

American basketball player (1931–2021)

Personal information
- Born: October 29, 1931 Austin, Minnesota, U.S.
- Died: December 3, 2021 (aged 91) Austin, Minnesota, U.S.
- Listed height: 6 ft 4 in (1.93 m)
- Listed weight: 195 lb (88 kg)

Career information
- High school: Grand Rapids (Grand Rapids, Minnesota)
- College: Minnesota (1952–1955)
- NBA draft: 1957: 8th round, 57th overall pick
- Drafted by: Detroit Pistons
- Playing career: 1957–1958
- Position: Guard
- Number: 8

Career history

Playing
- 1957–1958: Detroit Pistons

Coaching
- 1957–1959: Macalester (assistant)
- 1959–1979: Macalester
- 1979–1980: St. Olaf
- 1984–1994: Macalester
- Stats at NBA.com
- Stats at Basketball Reference

Frank Douglas Bolstorff (October 29, 1931 – December 3, 2021) was an American basketball player and coach. He played college basketball at University of Minnesota and professionally for one season, with the Detroit Pistons of the National Basketball Association (NBA). Bolstorff was selected by the Pistons in the eighth round with the 57th overall pick of the 1957 NBA draft. He appeared in three games during the 1957–58 season. Bolstorff served two stints as the head basketball coach at Macalester College in Saint Paul, Minnesota, from 1959 to 1979 and 1984 to 1994. He was the interim head basketball coach at St. Olaf College in Northfield, Minnesota for one season, in 1979–80. Prior to his retirement in 2000, Bolstorff was also a professor at Macalester and coached a number of other sports: track and field, cross country, baseball, and golf.

Bolstroff was born in Austin, Minnesota and grew up in Grand Rapids, Minnesota. He died on December 3, 2021, at age 91. His younger brother, David Bolstorff, is a former college football coach, chaplain, and professor.

== Career statistics ==
Legend
GP	Games played	GS	Games started	MPG	Minutes per game
FG%	Field goal percentage	3P%	3-point field goal percentage	FT%	Free throw percentage
RPG	Rebounds per game	APG	Assists per game	SPG	Steals per game
BPG	Blocks per game	PPG	Points per game	**Bold**	Career high

=== NBA ===
==== Regular season ====
Year	Team	GP	MPG	FG%	FT%	RPG	APG	PPG
1957–58	Detroit	3	7.0	.400	–	.0	.0	1.3
