= Lyon Scots football =

College football team

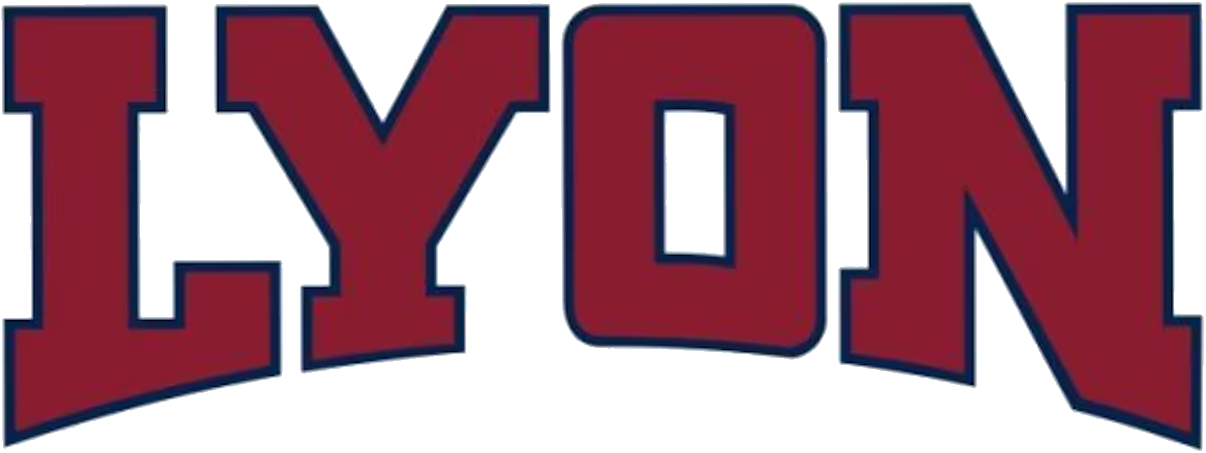
- First season: 2015; 11 years ago
- Athletic director: Kevin Jenkins
- Head coach: Chris Douglas; 7th season, 10–42 (.192)
- Location: Batesville, Arkansas
- Stadium: Pioneer Stadium (capacity: 2,684)
- NCAA division: Division III
- Conference: SCAC
- Colors: Lyon Blue and Lyon Red
- All-time record: 30–76 (.283)
- Mascot: Scot
- Website: lyonscots.com/football

The Lyon Scots football team represents Lyon College in college football at the NCAA Division III level. The Scots are members of the Southern Collegiate Athletic Conference (SCAC) after transitioning from the National Association of Intercollegiate Athletics (NAIA) and participating as an independent for a year in 2023. The Scots play their home games at Pioneer Stadium in Batesville, Arkansas.

Their head coach is Chris Douglas, who took over the position for the 2020 season.

== History ==
On June 27, 2013, Lyon College president, Dr. Donald Weatherman, announced the return of American football as a varsity sport after a 62-year hiatus when they last fielded a team as Arkansas College.

Lyon has maintained a rivalry with Hendrix College dubbed the "Battle for ScotZilla". The winner receives a trophy of Godzilla wearing traditional Scottish attire. Regarded as one of the most unique trophies in college football, it is a play on Lyon's Scottish heritage and then-Hendrix president William M. Tsutsui's interest in the Godzilla franchise.

== Conference affiliations ==
- Central States Football League (2015–2017)
- Sooner Athletic Conference (2018–2022)
- Independent (2023)
- Southern Collegiate Athletic Conference (2024–present)

== List of head coaches ==
=== Key ===
Key to symbols in coaches list
General		Overall		Conference		Postseason (Note: Although the first Rose Bowl Game was played in 1902, it has been continuously played since the 1916 game, and is recognized as the oldest bowl game by the NCAA. "—" indicates any season prior to 1916 when postseason games were not played.)	
No.	Order of coaches (Note: A running total of the number of head coaches, with coaches who served separate tenures being counted only once. Interim head coaches are represented with "Int" and are not counted in the running total. "—" indicates the team played but either without a coach or no coach is on record. "X" indicates an interim year without play.)	GC	Games coached	CW	Conference wins	PW	Postseason wins
DC	Division championships	OW	Overall wins	CL	Conference losses	PL	Postseason losses
CC	Conference championships	OL	Overall losses	CT	Conference ties	PT	Postseason ties
NC	National championships	OT	Overall ties (Note: Overtime rules in college football were introduced in 1996, making ties impossible in the period since.)	C%	Conference winning percentage		
†	Elected to the College Football Hall of Fame	O%	Overall winning percentage (Note: When computing the win–loss percentage, a tie counts as half a win and half a loss.)				

=== Coaches ===
List of head football coaches showing season(s) coached, overall records, conference records, postseason records, championships and selected awards
No.	Name	Season(s)	GC	OW	OL	O%	CW	CL	C%	PW	PL	DC	CC	NC	Awards
1	Kirk Kelley	2015	11	0	11	.000	0	6	.000	–	–	–	–	–	–
2	Kyle Phelps	2016–2017	22	9	13	0.409	6	8	0.429	–	–	–	–	–	–
3	Casey Creehan	2018–2019	21	11	10	0.524	8	8	0.500	–	–	–	–	–	–
4	Chris Douglas	2020–present	52	10	42	0.192	3	33	0.083	–	–	–	–	–	–

== Year-by-year results ==
National champions	Conference champions	Bowl game berth	Playoff berth

Season	Year	Head Coach	Association	Division	Conference	Record					Postseason	Final ranking
Season	Year	Head Coach	Association	Division	Conference	Overall		Conference			Postseason	Final ranking
Season	Year	Head Coach	Association	Division	Conference	Win	Loss	Finish	Win	Loss	Postseason	Final ranking
Lyon Scots
2015	2015	Kirk Kelley	NAIA	—	CSFL	0	11	7th	0	6	—	—
2016	2016	Kyle Phelps	NAIA	—	CSFL	3	8	T–4th	2	4	—	—
2017	2017	Kyle Phelps	NAIA	—	CSFL	6	5	5th	4	4	—	—
2018	2018	Casey Creehan	NAIA	—	SAC	4	7	T–7th	2	6	—	—
2019	2019	Casey Creehan	NAIA	—	SAC	7	3	T–3rd	6	2	—	—
2020	2020	Chris Douglas	NAIA	—	SAC	0	5	7th	0	5	—	—
2021	2021	Chris Douglas	NAIA	—	SAC	2	8	T–8th	2	7	—	—
2022	2022	Chris Douglas	NAIA	—	SAC	1	9	10th	0	9	—	—
2023	2023	Chris Douglas	NCAA	Division III	Independent	4	4	–	–	–	—	—
2024	2024	Chris Douglas	NCAA	Division III	SCAC	1	9	5th	0	8	—	—
2025	2025	Chris Douglas	NCAA	Division III	SCAC	2	7	T–4th	1	4	—	—
