= Chris Douglas (American football) =

American football coach (born 1970)

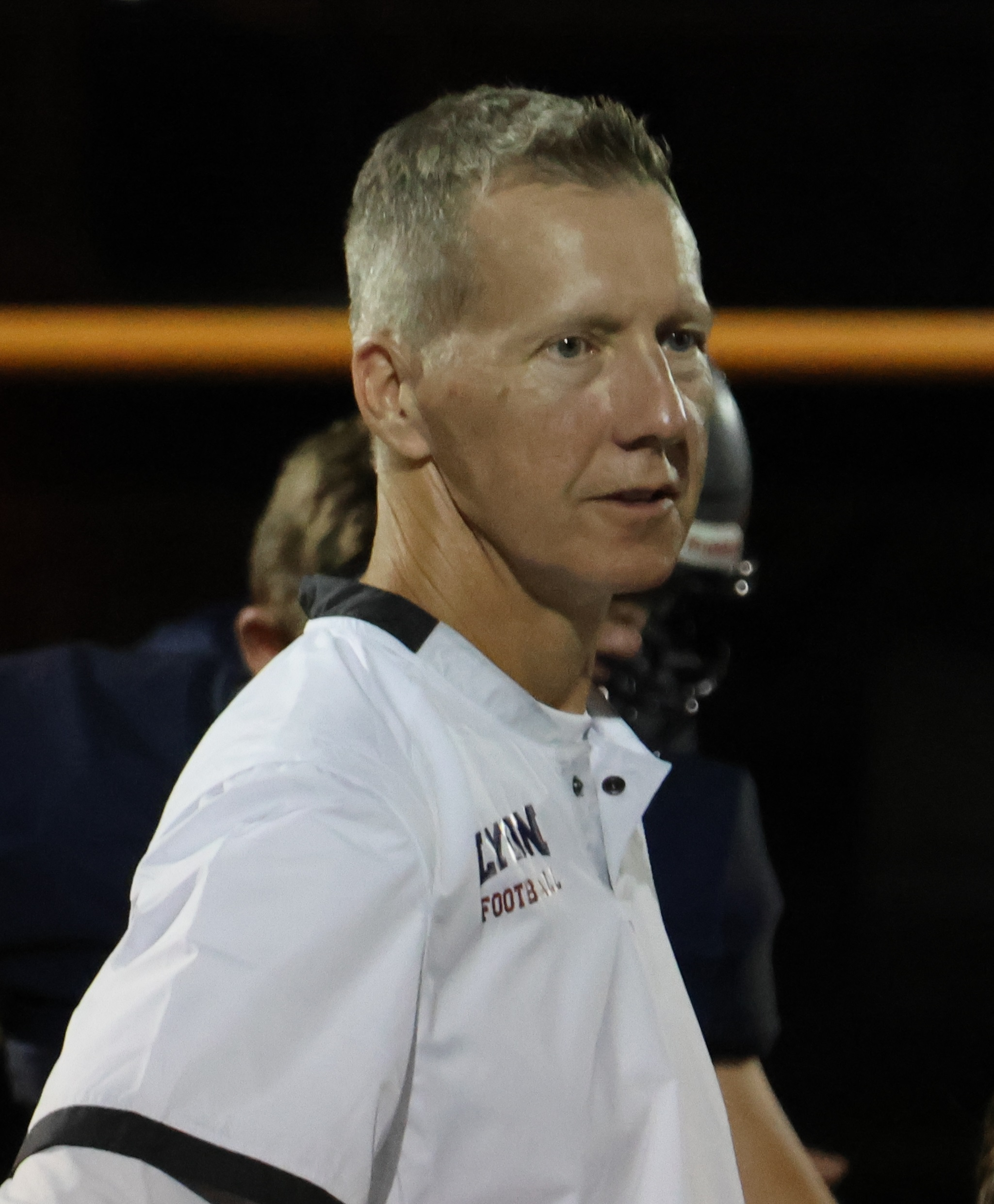

Current position
- Title: Head coach
- Team: Lyon
- Conference: SCAC
- Record: 10–42

Biographical details
- Born: c. 1970 (age 55–56)

Coaching career (HC unless noted)
- ?: Southwestern (KS) (assistant)
- ?: Abilene Christian (RB)
- 2000–2001: Jamestown (DC)
- 2002–2006: Southwestern (KS)
- 2007–2008: Stigler HS (OK)
- 2009–2010: Highland (KS) (OC)
- 2011–2019: MacMurray
- 2020–present: Lyon

Head coaching record
- Overall: 71–120 (college); 12–10 (high school)

Chris Douglas (born c. 1970) is an American college football coach. He is the head football coach for Lyon College, a position he has held since 2020. Douglas also served as the head football coach at Southwestern College in Winfield, Kansas from 2002 to 2006 and MacMurray College in Jacksonville, Illinois from 2011 to 2019. Douglas is a native of Poteau, Oklahoma.

== Head coaching record ==
=== College ===
Year	Team	Overall	Conference	Standing	Bowl/playoffs
Southwestern Moundbuilders (Kansas Collegiate Athletic Conference) (2002–2003)
2002	Southwestern	5–5	5–4	T–3rd	
2003	Southwestern	5–5	5–4	T–3rd	
2004	Southwestern	5–5	5–4	T–2nd	
2005	Southwestern	3–7	2–7	T–8th	
2006	Southwestern	2–8	2–7	T–7th	
Southwestern:		20–30	19–26		
MacMurray Highlanders (Upper Midwest Athletic Conference) (2011–2019)
2011	MacMurray	2–8	2–7	T–8th	
2012	MacMurray	2–8	2–6	T–6th	
2013	MacMurray	0–10	0–9	10th	
2014	MacMurray	3–7	3–6	7th	
2015	MacMurray	6–4	5–4	4th	
2016	MacMurray	8–2	7–2	T–2nd	
2017	MacMurray	8–2	7–2	2nd	
2018	MacMurray	7–2	7–1	2nd	
2019	MacMurray	5–5	5–3	T–3rd	
MacMurray:		41–48	38–40		
Lyon Scots (Sooner Athletic Conference) (2020–2022)
2020–21	Lyon	0–5	0–5	T–5th	
2021	Lyon	2–8	2–7	T–8th	
2022	Lyon	1–9	0–9	10th	
Lyon Scots (NCAA Division III independent) (2023)
2023	Lyon	4–4			
Lyon Scots (Southern Collegiate Athletic Conference) (2024–present)
2024	Lyon	1–9	0–8	5th	
2025	Lyon	2–7	1–4	T–4th	
2026	Lyon	0–0	0–0		
Lyon:		10–42	3–33		
Total:		71–120			

=== High school ===
Year	Team	Overall	Conference	Standing	Bowl/playoffs
Stigler Panthers () (2007–2008)
2007	Stigler	5–6	5–2	3rd	
2008	Stigler	7–4	6–1	2nd	
Stigler:		12–10	11–3		
Total:		12–10			
