= 2026 NAIA football rankings =

Rankings for the 2026 NAIA football season

- Season: 2026
- Postseason: Single-elimination

The 2026 National Association of Intercollegiate Athletics (NAIA) football rankings are conducted on a week-to-week basis.

== Legend ==
	Increase in ranking
	Decrease in ranking
	Not ranked previous week or no change
	Selected for NAIA playoffs
(#–#)	Win–loss record
(Italics)	Number of first place votes
т	Tied with team above or below also with this symbol

== NAIA Coaches' poll ==
	Preseason August 24	Week 1 September 14	Week 2 September 21	Week 3 September 28	Week 4 October 5	Week 5 October 12	Week 6 October 19	
1.	Grand View (13)	Grand View (3–0) (13)	Keiser (1–1) (8)	College of Idaho (4–0) т (5)	College of Idaho (5–0) (8)	College of Idaho (5–0) (9)	College of Idaho (6–0) (13)	1.
2.	Keiser	Keiser (1–1)	Montana Tech (4–0) (4)	Keiser (2–1) т (6)	Keiser (3–1) (4)	Keiser (4–1) (4)	Benedictine (KS) (7–1)	2.
3.	Benedictine (KS)	Montana Tech (3–0)	College of Idaho (3–0) (1)	Indiana Wesleyan (4–0)	Indiana Wesleyan (5–0)	Benedictine (KS) (6–1)	Grand View (6–1)	3.
4.	College of Idaho	College of Idaho (2–0)	Indiana Wesleyan (4–0)	Benedictine (KS) (5–1)	Benedictine (KS) (5–1)	Grand View (5–1)	St. Thomas (FL) (7–0)	4.
5.	Montana Tech	Lindsey Wilson (3–0)	Benedictine (KS) (3–1)	Grand View (4–1)	Grand View (5–1)	Montana Tech (6–1)	Montana Tech (6–1)	5.
6.	Lindsey Wilson	Indiana Wesleyan (3–0)	Grand View (3–1)	Montana Tech (4–1)	Montana Tech (5–1)	Morningside (6–1)	Morningside (6–1)	6.
7.	Morningside	Friends (3–0)	Morningside (3–1)	Morningside (4–1)	Morningside (5–1)	Friends (6–0)	Friends (7–0)	7.
8.	Dordt	Morningside (2–1)	Friends (4–0)	Friends (5–0)	Friends (6–0)	Marian (5–1)	Marian (6–1)	8.
9.	Friends т	Benedictine (KS) (2–1)	Campbellsville (4–0)	Campbellsville (4–0)	St. Thomas (FL) (5–0)	St. Thomas (FL) (6–0)	Indiana Wesleyan (6–1)	9.
10.	Indiana Wesleyan т	Campbellsville (3–0)	St. Thomas (FL) (4–0)	St. Thomas (FL) (4–0)	Marian (4–1)	Indiana Wesleyan (5–1)	Keiser (4–2)	10.
11.	Carroll (MT)	Dordt (1–1) т	Marian (3–1)	Marian (3–1)	Lindsey Wilson (5–1)	Carroll (MT) (5–1)	Carroll (MT) (6–1)	11.
12.	Marian (IN)	Marian (2–1) т	Lindsey Wilson (3–1)	Lindsey Wilson (4–1)	Carroll (MT) (4–1)	McPherson (6–0)	Campbellsville (6–1) т	12.
13.	William Penn	Northwestern (IA) (2–1)	Carroll (MT) (2–1)	Carroll (MT) (3–1)	Campbellsville (4–1)	Campbellsville (5–1)	Dordt (5–2) т	13.
14.	Campbellsville	St. Thomas (FL) (3–0)	Southeastern (2–0)	Southeastern (3–0)	McPherson (6–0)	Dordt (4–2)	Louisiana Christian (7–1)	14.
15.	Southeastern	Carroll (MT) (1–1)	McPherson (4–0)	McPherson (5–0)	Dordt (3–2)	Louisiana Christian (6–1)	Georgetown (KY) (4–2)	15.
16.	St. Thomas (FL)	Southeastern (2–0)	Dordt (1–2)	Midland (NE) (5–0)	Louisiana Christian (5–1)	Olivet Nazarene (5–0)	Lindsey Wilson (5–2)	16.
17.	Saint Francis (IN)	Evangel (3–0)	Olivet Nazarene (3–0)	Dordt (2–2)	Olivet Nazarene (4–0)	Georgetown (KY) (4–2)	McPherson (6–1)	17.
18.	Montana Western	McPherson (3–0)	Midland (NE) (4–0)	Olivet Nazarene (3–0)	William Penn (5–1)	Lindsey Wilson (5–2)	Midland (NE) (6–1)	18.
19.	Evangel	Louisiana Christian (3–0) т	William Penn (3–1)	Louisiana Christian (4–1)	Midland (NE) (5–1)	Midland (NE) (5–1)	Northwestern (IA) (6–2)	19.
20.	Georgetown (KY)	William Penn (2–1) т	Louisiana Christian (3–1)	William Penn (4–1)	Northwestern (IA) (4–2)	Northwestern (IA) (5–2)	Southeastern (5–1)	20.
21.	McPherson	Montana Western (1–1)	Dakota State (3–1)	Northwestern (IA) (3–2)	Southeastern (3–1)	William Penn (5–1)	Baker (KS) (5–1)	21.
22.	Southwestern (KS)	Olivet Nazarene (2–0)	Northwestern (IA) (2–2)	Dakota State (4–1)	Georgetown (KY) (3–2)	Southeastern (4–1)	Olivet Nazarene (5–1)	22.
23.	Reinhardt	Dakota State (2–1)	Baker (KS) (3–0)	Baker (KS) (4–0)	Dakota State (4–2)	Baker (KS) (5–1)	Southwestern (KS) (6–1)	23.
24.	Northwestern (IA)	Baker (KS) (2–0) т	Evangel (3–1)	Georgetown (KY) (2–2)	Baker (KS) (4–1)	Evangel (4–2)	Cumberlands (KY) (5–2)	24.
25.	Dakota State	Georgetown (KY) (1–2) т	Georgetown (KY) (2–2)	Cumberland (TN) (3–1)	Evangel (4–2)	Cumberland (TN) (4–2)	Taylor (5–2)	25.
	Preseason August 24	Week 1 September 14	Week 2 September 21	Week 3 September 28	Week 4 October 5	Week 5 October 12	Week 6 October 19	
		Dropped: No. 17 Saint Francis (IN); No. 23 Southwestern (KS); No. 24 Reinhardt	Dropped: No. 21 Montana Western	Dropped: No. 24 Evangel	Dropped: No. 25 Cumberland (TN)	Dropped: No. 23 Dakota State	Dropped: No. 21 William Penn; No. 24 Evangel; No. 25 Cumberland (TN)	

== NAIA NSC poll ==
	Week 7 October 27	Week 8 November 3	Week 9 (Final) November 10	Final	
1.	St. Thomas (FL) (8–0)	St. Thomas (FL) (9–0)	College of Idaho (9–0)		1.
2.	College of Idaho (7–0)	College of Idaho (8–0)	St. Thomas (FL) (10–0)		2.
3.	Benedictine (KS) (8–1)	Benedictine (KS) (9–1)	Benedictine (KS) (10–1)		3.
4.	Montana Tech (7–1)	Morningside (8–1)	Morningside (9–1)		4.
5.	Morningside (7–1)	Montana Tech (8–1)	Montana Tech (9–1)		5.
6.	Marian (IN) (7–1)	Marian (IN) (8–1)	Marian (IN) (9–1)		6.
7.	Indiana Wesleyan (7–1)	Indiana Wesleyan (8–1)	Indiana Wesleyan (9–1)		7.
8.	Grand View (7–1)	Grand View (8–1)	Grand View (9–1)		8.
9.	Georgetown (KY) (5–2)	Lindsey Wilson (7–2)	Lindsey Wilson (8–2)		9.
10.	Campbellsville (6–1)	Campbellsville (7–1)	Campbellsville (8–1)		10.
11.	Lindsey Wilson (6–2)	Dordt (7–2)	Dordt (8–2)		11.
12.	Carroll (MT) (6–1)	Carroll (MT) (7–1)	Northwestern (IA) (8–2)		12.
13.	Dordt (6–2)	Northwestern (IA) (8–2)	Southwestern (KS) (9–1)		13.
14.	Northwestern (IA) (7–2)	Southwestern (KS) (8–1)	Carroll (MT) (7–2)		14.
15.	Louisiana Christian (8–1)	Keiser (6–2)	Friends (9–1)		15.
	Week 7 October 27	Week 8 November 3	Week 9 (Final) November 10	Final	
		Dropped: No. 9 Georgetown (KY); No. 15 Louisiana Christian	Dropped: No. 15 Keiser	None	
