= Rebecca Fjelland Davis =

American novelist

- Born: 1956 (age 69–70); Huxley, Iowa, U.S.
- Education: Waldorf College; St. Cloud State University (BA); Minnesota State University, Mankato (MFA)
- Occupations: Novelist; children's book author; lecturer; college instructor
- Writing career
- Genres: Young adult, children's literature, nonfiction
- Website: www.rebeccafjellanddavis.com

Rebecca Fjelland Davis (born 1956) is an American novelist and children's book author who lives in Minnesota. She is currently an instructor at South Central College in Mankato, where she teaches composition studies, literature and film, and critical thinking in Humanities.

Her novels, Chasing AllieCat and Jake Riley: Irreparably Damaged, have been reviewed by Kirkus Reviews.

== Biography ==
Davis grew up on a farm outside Huxley, Iowa. She graduated with honors from Waldorf College, St. Cloud State University (earning her Bachelor of Arts in English) and from Minnesota State University, Mankato (earning her Master of Fine Arts in Creative Writing). A former marathoner and two-time women's champion of the National 24-Hour Challenge cycling event, she has been known to work athletic themes into her young adult writing, similar to her former husband Terry Davis.

== Bibliography ==
- 10, 9, 8 Polar Animals: A Counting Backward Book. Capstone Press, 2006. ISBN 978-0-7368-6374-2.
- Beaches and Bicycles: A Summer Counting Book. Capstone Press, 2006. ISBN 978-0-7368-6891-4.
- Chasing AllieCat. Flux, 2011. ISBN 978-0-7387-2130-9.
- Counting Pets by Twos. Capstone Press, 2006. ISBN 978-0-7368-6375-9.
- Flowers and Showers: A Spring Counting Book. Capstone Press, 2006. ISBN 978-0-7368-6890-7.
- Footballs and Falling Leaves: A Fall Counting Book. Capstone Press, 2006. ISBN 978-0-7368-6889-1.
- Jake Riley: Irreparably Damaged. HarperTempest, 2003. ISBN 978-0-06-051837-0.
- The History of the Washington Mystics (Women's Pro Basketball Today). Creative Education, 1999. ISBN 978-1-58341-012-7.
- Medusa Tells All: Beauty Missing, Hair Hissing (The Other Side of Myth). Capstone Press, 2014. ISBN 978-1-4795-2960-5
- More or Less: A Rainforest Counting Book. Capstone Press, 2006. ISBN 978-0-7368-6376-6.
- Snowflakes and Ice Skates: A Winter Counting Book. Capstone Press, 2006. ISBN 978-0-7368-6892-1.
- Woof & Wag: Bringing Home a Dog. Picture Window Books, 2008. ISBN 978-1-4048-4868-9.
- Zoo Animals: 1,2,3. Capstone Press, 2006. ISBN 978-0-7368-6377-3.

== Anthologies ==
- Wonderful Things I Scarcely Understand: Twenty Years of Robert Wright Award Winners. Edited by Roger Sheffer. Minnesota State University, Mankato, 2003. ISBN 978-0-615-12339-4.
- Girl Meets Boy: Because There are Two Sides to Every Story. Edited by Kelly Milner Halls. Chronicle, 2012. ISBN 978-1452102641.

== Awards ==
- 1990: Robert Wright Creative Writing Contest Winner. Minnesota State University, Mankato.
- 2003: Blue Ribbon Award Winner (for Jake Riley: Irreparably Damaged), The Bulletin of the Center for Children's Books.
- 2007: Honorable Mention Award (for Chasing AllieCat, a work-in-progress YA novel), Loft Awards for Children's Literature /Older Children.
- 2008: Artist Initiative Grant (for Slider's Son, work-in-progress middle grade novel), Minnesota State Arts Board.
- 2011: Junior Library Guild Selection -- Chasing AllieCat
- 2017: Prairie Lakes Regional Arts Council Mid-Career Artist Grant (for Slider's Son publication promotion)
