= 2022 NAIA football season =

American college football season

- Regular season: August 25 – November 12, 2022
- Postseason: November 19 – December 17, 2022
- National Championship: Durham County Memorial Stadium; Durham, NC; December 17, 2022
- Champion: Northwestern (IA)
- Player of the Year: Joe Dolincheck (quarterback, Morningside)

The 2022 NAIA football season is the component of the 2022 college football season organized by the National Association of Intercollegiate Athletics (NAIA) in the United States.

The regular season began on August 25 and culminated on November 12.

The playoffs, known as the NAIA Football National Championship, will begin on November 19 and culminate with the championship game on December 17 at Durham County Memorial Stadium in Durham, North Carolina.

== Conference changes and new programs ==
Appalachian Athletic Conference and Sun Conference started to sponsor football this season.

=== Membership changes ===
School	Former conference	New conference
Ave Maria Gyrenes	Mid-South	Sun Conference
Bluefield Rams	Mid-South	Appalachian
Florida Memorial Lions	Mid-South	Sun Conference
Keiser Seahawks	Mid-South	Sun Conference
Kentucky Christian Knights	Mid-South	Appalachian
North American Stallions	Independent (No affiliation)	Independent
Point Skyhawks	Mid-South	Appalachian
Reinhardt Eagles	Mid-South	Appalachian
St. Andrews (NC) Knights	Mid-South	Appalachian
Saint Thomas (FL) Bobcats	Mid-South	Sun Conference
Southeastern (FL) Fire	Mid-South	Sun Conference
Union (KY) Bulldogs	Mid-South	Appalachian
Warner Royals	Mid-South	Sun Conference
Webber International Warriors	Mid-South	Sun Conference

== Conference standings ==
2022 Appalachian Athletic Conference football standings
	Conf.			Overall
Team	W		L	W		L
No. 9 Reinhardt $^	5	–	0	8	–	2
Bluefield	4	–	1	8	–	3
Point	3	–	2	4	–	7
Kentucky Christian	2	–	3	3	–	8
St. Andrews	1	–	4	1	–	10
Union (KY)	0	–	5	0	–	10
$ – Conference champion; ^ – NAIA playoff participant; Rankings from NAIA Coaches' Poll

2022 Frontier Conference football standings
	Conf.			Overall
Team	W		L	W		L
No. 18 College of Idaho +	8	–	2	8	–	2
No. 16 Carroll (MT) +^	8	–	2	8	–	3
No. 24 Montana Tech	7	–	3	7	–	3
Montana Western	7	–	3	7	–	4
Rocky Mountain	2	–	8	2	–	9
Southern Oregon	3	–	7	3	–	7
Eastern Oregon	2	–	8	2	–	9
Montana State–Northern	0	–	10	0	–	10
+ – Conference co-champions; ^ – NAIA playoff participant; Rankings from NAIA Coaches' Poll

2022 Great Plains Athletic Conference football standings
	Conf.			Overall
Team	W		L	W		L
No. 1 Morningside $^	10	–	0	11	–	1
No. 3 Northwestern (IA) ^	9	–	1	13	–	1
Midland	7	–	3	8	–	3
No. 25 Dordt	7	–	3	7	–	3
Hastings	6	–	4	7	–	4
Concordia (NE)	4	–	6	4	–	6
Doane	4	–	6	4	–	6
Jamestown	3	–	7	4	–	7
Mount Marty	2	–	8	3	–	8
Dakota Wesleyan	2	–	8	2	–	9
Briar Cliff	1	–	9	1	–	10
$ – Conference champion; ^ – NAIA playoff participant; Rankings from NAIA Coaches' Poll

2022 Heart of America Athletic Conference football standings
	Conf.			Overall
Team	W		L	W		L
North
No. 2 Grand View x^	5	–	0	13	–	1
Peru State	4	–	1	6	–	5
Culver–Stockton	3	–	2	5	–	6
Graceland	2	–	3	4	–	7
William Penn	1	–	4	3	–	7
Clarke	0	–	5	3	–	8
South
No. 6 Benedictine (KS) x^	5	–	0	11	–	2
Evangel	4	–	1	7	–	3
MidAmerica Nazarene	3	–	2	7	–	4
Baker	2	–	3	5	–	6
Central Methodist	1	–	4	1	–	10
Missouri Valley	0	–	5	3	–	8
x – Division champion/co-champions; ^ – NAIA playoff participant; Rankings from NAIA Coaches' Poll

2022 Kansas Collegiate Athletic Conference football standings
	Conf.			Overall
Team	W		L	W		L
No. 14 Bethel (KS) +	9	–	1	9	–	1
No. 13 Avila +^	9	–	1	10	–	2
No. 10 Southwestern (KS) +^	9	–	1	9	–	2
Kansas Wesleyan	7	–	3	8	–	3
Tabor	5	–	5	6	–	5
McPherson	5	–	5	5	–	5
Saint Mary (KS)	4	–	6	4	–	7
Friends	3	–	7	4	–	7
Ottawa (KS)	2	–	8	2	–	8
Sterling	2	–	8	2	–	8
Bethany (KS)	0	–	10	0	–	10
+ – Conference co-champions; ^ – NAIA playoff participant; Rankings from NAIA Coaches' Poll

2022 Mid-South Conference football standings
	Conf.			Overall
Team	W		L	W		L
No. 4 Bethel (TN) $^	8	–	0	11	–	1
No. 8 Lindsey Wilson ^	7	–	1	10	–	2
No. 21 Georgetown (KY)	5	–	3	7	–	3
Pikeville	5	–	3	6	–	4
Thomas More	4	–	4	5	–	6
Cumberlands (KY)	3	–	5	5	–	5
Faulkner	3	–	5	4	–	7
Cumberland (TN)	1	–	7	3	–	7
Campbellsville	0	–	8	2	–	8
$ – Conference champion; ^ – NAIA playoff participant; Rankings from NAIA Coaches' Poll

2022 Mid-States Football Association standings
	Conf.			Overall
Team	W		L	W		L
Mideast League
No. 5 Indiana Wesleyan x^	7	–	0	11	–	2
No. 7 Marian (IN) ^	6	–	1	9	–	2
Concordia (MI)	4	–	3	5	–	5
Siena Heights	4	–	3	5	–	5
Taylor	3	–	4	5	–	6
Saint Francis (IN)	2	–	5	4	–	6
Lawrence Tech	2	–	5	3	–	7
Madonna	0	–	7	0	–	11
Midwest League
No. 11 Saint Xavier x^	7	–	0	9	–	3
No. 23 St. Francis (IL)	6	–	1	7	–	3
Olivet Nazarene	5	–	2	7	–	4
Roosevelt	4	–	3	7	–	3
Missouri Baptist	2	–	5	4	–	7
St. Ambrose	2	–	5	2	–	8
Judson	1	–	6	2	–	8
Trinity International	1	–	6	1	–	10
x – League champion ^ – NAIA playoff participant; Rankings from NAIA Coaches' Poll

2022 North Star Athletic Association football standings
	Conf.			Overall
Team	W		L	W		L
No. 17 Dickinson State $^	6	–	0	8	–	3
Dakota State	4	–	2	6	–	4
Valley City State	4	–	2	5	–	5
Waldorf	3	–	3	7	–	4
Iowa Wesleyan	2	–	4	4	–	7
Presentation	2	–	4	3	–	8
Mayville State	0	–	6	3	–	8
$ – Conference champion; ^ – NAIA playoff participant; Rankings from NAIA Coaches' Poll

2022 Sooner Athletic Conference football standings
	Conf.			Overall
Team	W		L	W		L
No. 22 Texas Wesleyan +	7	–	2	9	–	2
No. 19 OUAZ +	7	–	2	7	–	2
No. 20 Arizona Christian +^	7	–	2	8	–	3
SAGU	6	–	3	7	–	3
Louisiana Christian	6	–	3	7	–	4
Langston	5	–	4	6	–	4
OK Panhandle State	4	–	5	4	–	6
Wayland Baptist	2	–	7	2	–	8
Texas College	1	–	8	1	–	9
Lyon	0	–	9	1	–	9
+ – Conference co-champions; ^ – NAIA playoff participant; Rankings from NAIA Coaches' Poll

2022 Sun Conference football standings
	Conf.			Overall
Team	W		L	W		L
No. 12 Keiser $^	6	–	0	10	–	4
No. 15 St. Thomas (FL)	5	–	1	9	–	2
Ave Maria	3	–	2	6	–	3
Webber International	3	–	3	6	–	4
Southeastern	2	–	3	6	–	4
Florida Memorial	1	–	5	3	–	7
Warner	0	–	6	1	–	9
$ – Conference champion; ^ – NAIA playoff participant; Rankings from NAIA Coaches' Poll

2022 NAIA independents football records
	Conf.			Overall
Team	W		L	W		L
North American		–		3	–	9
Arkansas Baptist		–		1	–	7

== Postseason ==
=== Bracket ===
First Round; November 19
1	Morningside	35
16	Arizona Christian	18
4	Bethel (TN)	17
12	Keiser	27
2	Grand View	17
15	Carroll (MT)	14
8	Lindsey Wilson	23
9	Reinhardt	22
3	Northwestern (IA)	49
14	Dickinson State	7
7	Marian (IN)	41
11	Saint Xavier	7
5	Indiana Wesleyan	14
13	Avila	7
6	Benedictine (KS)	35
10	Southwestern (KS)	7

Quarterfinals; November 26
1	Morningside	28
12	Keiser	29
2	Grand View	10
8	Lindsey Wilson	7
3	Northwestern (IA)	52
7	Marian (IN)	27
5	Indiana Wesleyan	24
6	Benedictine (KS)	13

Semifinals; December 3
12	Keiser	38
2	Grand View	21
3	Northwestern (IA)	38
5	Indiana Wesleyan	7

Championship; December 17
12	Keiser	25
3	Northwestern (IA)	35

=== Bowl game ===
Olivet Nazarene and Southwestern Assemblies of God did not qualify for the NAIA playoffs, but were invited to compete in the Victory Bowl to decide the 2022 National Christian College Athletic Association championship.

Date	Time (EST)	Game	Site	Television	Teams	Affiliations	Results
Nov. 22	6:00 pm	Victory Bowl	Lumpkins Stadium; Waxahachie, Texas		Olivet Nazarene; SAGU*	MSFA; SAC; NCCAA	Olivet Nazarene 21–16

* – Host team

== See also ==
- 2022 NCAA Division I FBS football season
- 2022 NCAA Division I FCS football season
- 2022 NCAA Division II football season
- 2022 NCAA Division III football season
- 2022 U Sports football season
- 2022 junior college football season
