= Kent Anderson (American football) =

American football coach and former player

Playing career
- 1983–1985: Iowa State
- Position: Wide receiver

Coaching career (HC unless noted)
- 1991–1992: North Carolina (GA)
- 1993: Simpson (WR)
- 1994–2000: Braunschweig Lions
- 2001–2002: Hamburg Blue Devils
- 2003–2004: Berlin Adler
- 2005–2006: Braunschweig Lions
- 2007–2009: Kiel Baltic Hurricanes
- 2010–2011: Iowa Wesleyan
- 2012–2016: Waldorf
- 2018–2019: Davis County HS (IA)

Head coaching record
- Overall: 17–56 (college)

Kent Anderson is an American football coach and former player. He is the head football coach at Davis County High School in Bloomfield, Iowa, a position he has held since 2018. Anderson served as the head football coach at Iowa Wesleyan College in Mount Pleasant, Iowa from 2010 to 2011 and Waldorf University in Forest City, Iowa from 2012 to 2016, compiling a career college football coaching record of 17–56. He played college football at Iowa State University from 1983 to 1985 as a wide receiver.

Between 1994 and 2009, Anderson coached American football teams in Germany, being elected to the German Football Hall of Fame.

== American head coaching record ==
=== College ===
Year	Team	Overall	Conference	Standing	Bowl/playoffs
Iowa Wesleyan Tigers (NAIA independent) (2010–2011)
2010	Iowa Wesleyan	3–8			
2011	Iowa Wesleyan	3–7			
Iowa Wesleyan:		6–15			
Waldorf Warriors (Mid-States Football Association) (2012–2013)
2012	Waldorf	2–9	1–5	T–5th (MWL)	
2013	Waldorf	1–10	0–6	7th (MWL)	
Waldorf Warriors (North Star Athletic Association) (2014–2016)
2014	Waldorf	3–7	1–5	6th	
2015	Waldorf	3–7	2–4	6th	
2016	Waldorf	2–8	1–5	T–6th	
Waldorf:		11–41	5–25		
Total:		17–56			
