= Waldorf Warriors football =

- First season: 1965; 61 years ago (Note: They played as a junior college until 2002, their first season as a four-year institution was in 2003; 23 years ago.)
- Athletic director: Chad Gassmann
- Head coach: David Calloway; 1st season, 0–0 (–)
- Location: Forest City, Iowa
- Field: Bolstroff Field
- League: National Association of Intercollegiate Athletics
- Conference: Great Plains Athletic Conference
- Colors: Purple and gold
- All-time record: 59–131 (.311)
- Website: waldorfwarriors.com/fball

The Waldorf Warriors football team represents Waldorf University in college football, as part of the National Association of Intercollegiate Athletics NAIA.

== History ==
Waldorf's football team played their first NAIA Division II game in 2003. Their former head football coaches include David Bolstorff, Gregg Youngblood, Kent Anderson (American football), Josh Littrell, Will Finley, and Tyler Chapa.

== Coaches ==
=== David Bolstorff (1965–2006) ===
David Bolstorff was the first head football coach for the Waldorf Warriors. He was the head coach from 1965-2006. During his time at Waldorf College his record was 189-184-2. He helped the school transition from a two year program junior college to a four year program in 2003.

=== Greg Youngblood (2007–2011) ===
Greg Youngblood is the former head football coach for the Dordt College Defenders, located in Sioux Center, Iowa. In 2007, he was named the head football coach for the Waldorf Warriors, where he remained until 2011. Previously, Youngblood had coached for sixteen years at the high school and collegiate levels, including as an assistant coach at Taylor University, in Upland, Indiana; and as a head coach or assistant coach at three New Mexico high schools. During his time at Waldorf, the team won nine games and lost 45.

=== Kent Anderson (2012–2017) ===
During Kent Anderson's first season at Waldorf, he instilled a new, dynamic offense that allowed the Warriors to shatter records. In the 2012 season, the team finished with a ranking of 19th in the NAIA in points per game (32.7), higher than the two previous seasons' combined averages. Following that record-breaking season, Anderson was chosen as both the Outstanding Head Coach and Offensive Coordinator by the NAIA for the annual NCAA Division II vs. NAIA Senior Bowl, which takes place in Myrtle Beach, South Carolina.

Immediately prior to his arrival at Waldorf, Anderson spent two seasons as the offensive coordinator at Iowa Wesleyan College, where the team compiled the most wins in a season since 1997. Before coaching at Iowa Wesleyan, Anderson spent 15 years as a head coach in the German Football League (GFL). While there, Anderson compiled a 182–62–5 record, won eight national championships with four teams, and was also a six-time National Coach of the Year.

=== Josh Littrell (2017–2019) ===
Josh Littrell was hired for the position of head football coach for the Waldorf Warriors on June 19, 2017. Josh is a veteran coach, former physical education teacher, and game-passing coordinator at Del Rio High School in Del Rio, Texas. A proponent of cultural activities, Littrell once said, "We want to be more competitive, and as part of that, I want each of our students to learn how to be a great teammate first."

Littrell went 8-3 (6-2) in his first season leading the Warriors. Match the total number of wins as the previous four seasons combined. During his 2018 campaign, the Warriors went 5-5 overall and finished second in the conference at 5-2. In 2018 the Warriors set team records for yards per carry, points per game, passing yards, and rushing TDs in a season.

In his final year, Waldorf went 7-3 overall and 5-2 in the North Star Athletic Association finishing second for the third straight year. The Warriors earned their first ever NAIA Top 25 ranking finishing No. 23 in the final NAIA Top 25 poll. Offensive lineman Robert Mosley, quarterback Hilton "Bo" Joseph, and wide receiver Ryan Martinez all were named All-Americans.

=== Will Finley (2020–2022) ===
Will Finley was promoted to the position of head football coach for the Waldorf Warriors on March 6, 2020, after spending the 2019 season as the Warriors associate head coach and defensive coordinator. Will is a graduate of Benedictine College in Atchison, Kan., where he began his coaching career. He spent 8 years as a coach with the Ravens, his final year (2018) as the interim defensive coordinator for a Benedictine team that advanced to the NAIA National Championship game. In his first season as the Warriors head coach, Finley led Waldorf to a 6-3 record overall and in NSAA play, good for a third-place finish in the standings. Finley also was named to the 35 Under 35 Coaches Leadership Institute by the AFCA. Finley's team earned a season-best ranking of No. 24 in the NAIAFBALL Top 25 poll, landed 17 players on the NSAA All-Conference Teams, and saw kicker Slater Gifford earn the first 1st Team All-American honors in program history. Gifford set team career records of 19 field goals made and 109 career PATs made in just three seasons. Ryan Martinez also became the all-time leader at Waldorf in touchdown receptions with 29, and Samuel Huntley became the all-time leader in receptions with 171.

=== Tyler Chapa (2023–2025) ===
Tyler Chapa was promoted to the position of head football coach for the Waldorf Warriors in 2023. He has been a part of the Waldorf Football Program since 2019 where he was first a graduate assistant. He moved into coaching defensive backs in his first role with the team. Eventually he was named Defensive Coordinator for the Warriors prior to being promoted to Head Coach. His first season leading the Warriors saw a 4-7 record.

Coach Chapa led the Warriors into their first season in the Great Plains Athletic Conference to an 0-11 record. Three players on the 2024 squad made All Conference, Honorable Mention. Luke Beyer, Gerardo Caldera-Hernandez and Jack Thompson.

In 2025, the Warriors compiled an overall record of 0-10 and with two players having received All Conference accolades: Joseph McCubbin (Second Team Special Teams) and Christian Gerot (Honorable Mention). On Monday, November 17, Chapa informed the team that he would not be returning as head coach.

=== David Calloway (2026–present) ===
On December 11, 2025, Waldorf announced the hiring of David Calloway] as head football coach.

=== Current coaching staff ===
Position	Name	Alma mater
Head coach, Special Teams	David Calloway	Langston University
Offensive Coordinator, Quarterbacks	Danny Donadio	Cal Poly Humboldt
Defensive Coordinator, Inside Linebackers	Tom Clarey	Northwestern College (IA)
Defensive Line Coach, Equipment	Ben Brummer	Crown College
Offensive Line, Recruiting Coordinator	Riley Bardes	Western Oregon University
Defensive Backs	Kasen Handal	Waldorf University
Wide Receivers	Tyler Dennis	Waldorf University
Outside Linebackers	CJ Noke	Waldorf University
Defensive Assistant	Josh Mitchell	Waldorf University
Offensive Assistant	Louis Williams	Waldorf University
Director of Player Personnel	Andrew Buffington	Northwest Missouri State University
