= Waldorf University =

Private university in Forest City, Iowa, US

- Former name: Waldorf College (1903–2016)
- Motto: Lux et Veritas
- Motto in English: Light and Truth
- Type: Private university
- Established: 1903
- Religious affiliation: Lutheran (historically related to the ELCA)
- President: Robert Alsop
- Academic staff: 71
- Students: 2,763 (fall 2022)
- Location: Forest City, Iowa, United States; 43.263365°N 93.639992°W
- Campus: Rural, 50 acres
- Colors: Purple and gold
- Nickname: Warriors
- Sporting affiliations: NAIA – Great Plains Athletic Conference
- Website: waldorf.edu
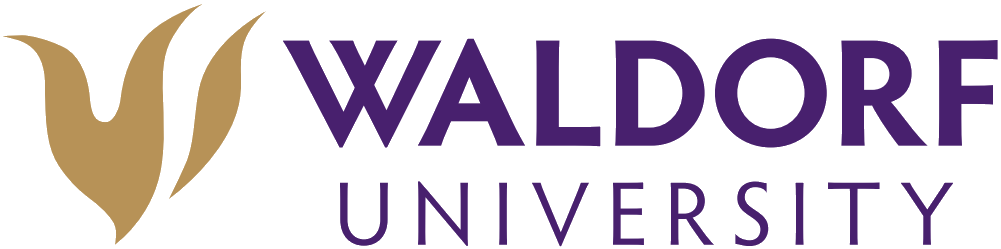

Waldorf University is a private university in Forest City, Iowa, United States. It was founded in 1903 and associated with the Evangelical Lutheran Church in America and its predecessors. In 2010, it was sold to Columbia Southern University and became a for-profit institution; twelve years later, on December 1, 2022, ownership was transferred to the Waldorf Lutheran College Foundation.

== History ==
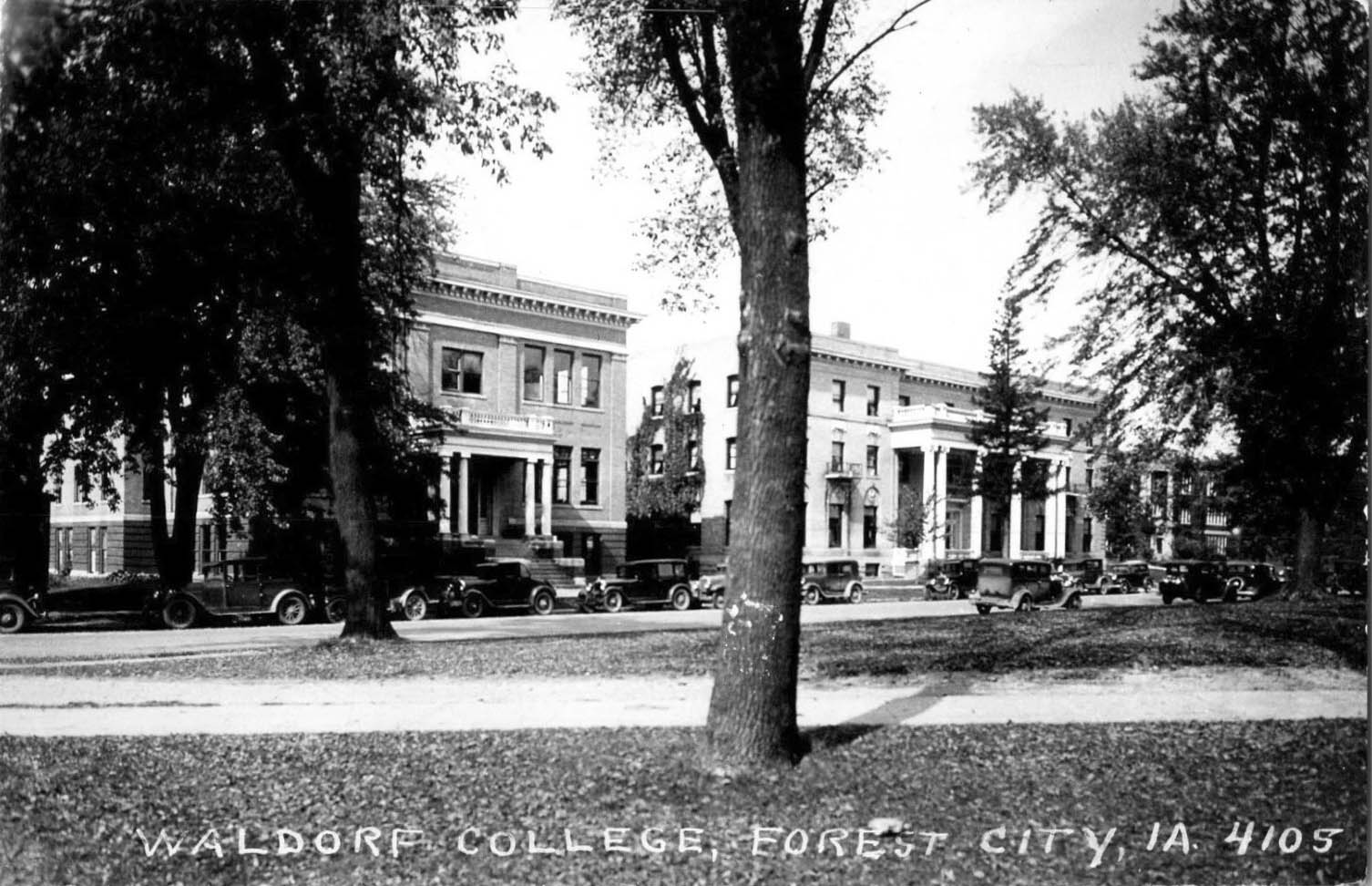
The college on a 1948 postcard

Waldorf University, founded in 1903 as Waldorf College, was a result of "The Great Hotel War of Forest City", a competitive battle between Forest City's two upper-class hotels, which were built at the same time. The result was the Waldorf Hotel being left vacant after only four months of operation. The vacant hotel provided an opportunity for Rev. C.S. Salveson to create a Christian college. Waldorf started out as an academy and business college, not just a preparatory program for future pastors. From its earliest days, Waldorf viewed education sponsored by the church as essential for success in society.

Since 1920, Waldorf's curriculum has evolved to reflect a liberal arts emphasis. Today, almost all Waldorf students intend to earn a bachelor's degree. In the spring of 1994, Waldorf College was accredited by the North Central Association of Colleges and Schools.

In January 2010, the Evangelical Lutheran Church in America sold the college to a subsidiary of Columbia Southern University and it became a for-profit institution. Waldorf College became Waldorf University on March 17, 2016. On December 1, 2022, the ownership of the college was transferred to the Waldorf Lutheran College Foundation and the university was a recognized nonprofit organization and sought the return to recognition as a nonprofit educational institution with the Department of Education. As of July 2025, the university's accreditor classified the university as "non-profit" and news reports indicated that the U.S. Department of Education approved the change though the department's official database of institutional information still classified the university as "for-profit".

=== Presidents ===
Waldorf has had the following presidents:

- C. S. Salveson (1903–1904)
- Lars W. Boe (1904–1915)
- Martin Hegland (1915–1919)
- O. O. Bjertness (acting president 1919–1920)
- C. B. Helgen (1920–1929)
- C. M. Granskou (1929–1932)
- J. L. Rendahl (1932–1943)
- M. O. Nilssen (1943–1950)
- A. L. Halvorson (acting president 1950–1951)
- Sidney A. Rand (1951–1956)
- Sigvald D. Fauske (1956–1970)
- Gerrish Severson (acting president 1970–1971)
- Paul D. Mork (1971–1978)
- Morris Wee (acting president 1978–1979, 1985–1986)
- Arndt F. Braaten (1979–1985)
- William E. Hamm (1986–1999)
- Thomas L. Jolivette (1999–2004)
- Robert L. Vogel (acting president 2004–2005)
- Richard A. Hanson (2005–2010)
- Joseph Manjone (2010–2011)
- Robert A. Alsop (2011–present), joined faculty in 1998

== Academics ==
Waldorf University offers associate, bachelor, and master's degree programs, as well as several undergraduate certificate options and online career-prep programs. It is accredited by the Higher Learning Commission (HLC).

=== Undergraduate admissions ===
According to the 2019 U.S. News & World Report, Waldorf University is considered "less selective" and had an admissions acceptance rate of 72%. Peterson's - The Real Guide to Colleges and Universities ranked Waldorf College admission as being moderately difficult.

=== Honor societies ===
Waldorf University is home to Alpha Chi honor society's Iowa Iota chapter.

Waldorf University Theatre is home to the Alpha Epsilon Omega cast of Alpha Psi Omega National Theatre Honor Society (APO). Waldorf University is also an active member in the Kennedy Center American College Theatre Festival.

The university is also home to the Alpha Iota Lambda chapter of the Alpha Sigma Lambda, which is the oldest and largest national honor society for non-traditional students.

== Athletics ==
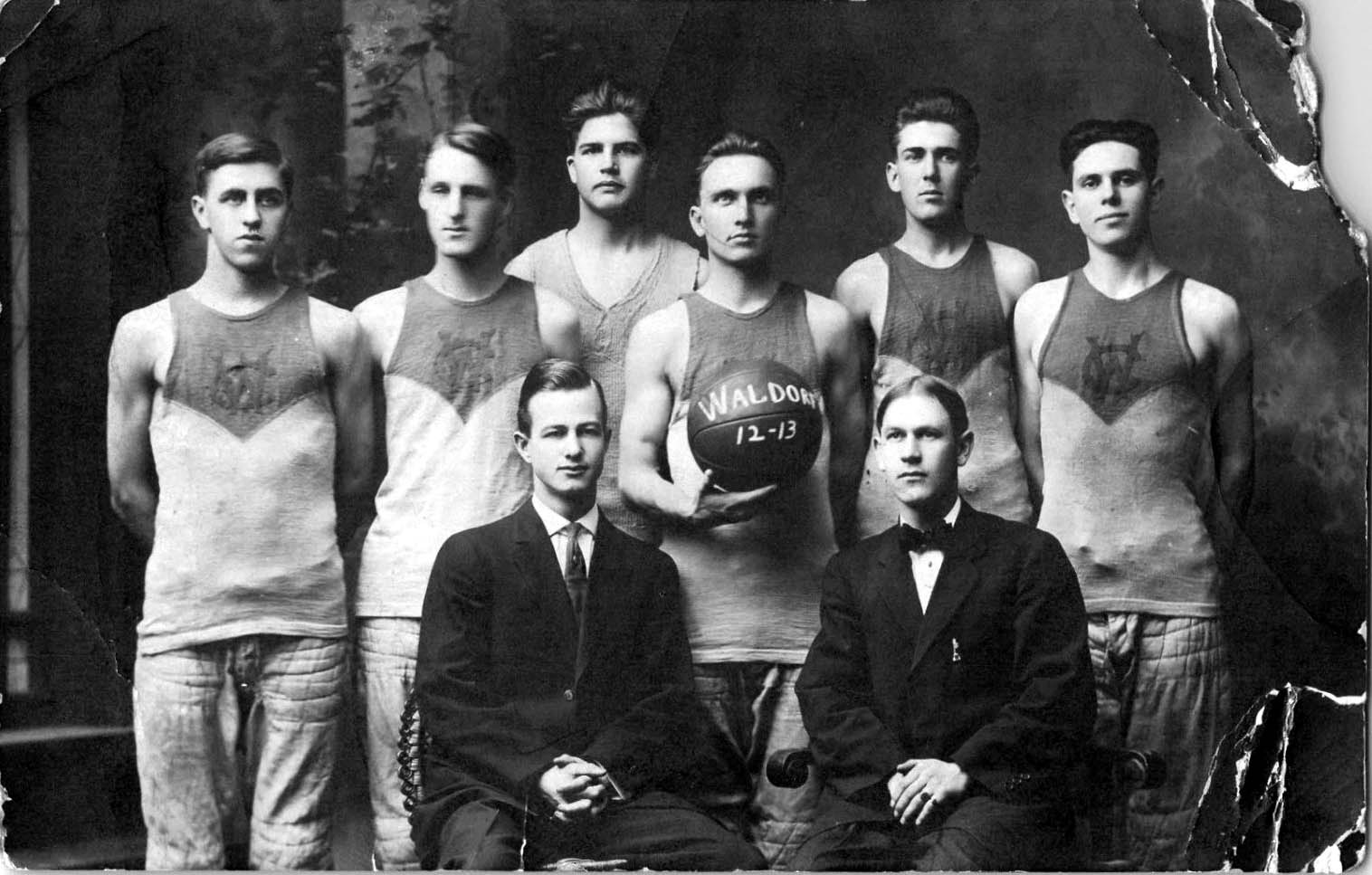
Waldorf basketball team of 1912–13

Waldorf's athletic teams are called the Warriors. The university is a member of the National Association of Intercollegiate Athletics (NAIA), has competed in the Great Plains Athletic Conference (GPAC) since the 2024-25 academic year. The Warriors previously competed in these conferences: the North Star Athletic Association (NSAA) from the 2015-16 to 2023-24; the Midlands Collegiate Athletic Conference (MCAC) from 2012-13 to 2014-15; and the Midwest Collegiate Conference (MCC) from 2003-04 to 2011-12.

Waldorf competes in 22 intercollegiate varsity sports. Men's sports include baseball, basketball, bowling, cross country, football, golf, ice hockey, soccer, track & field and wrestling; women's sports include basketball, bowling, cross country, golf, soccer, softball, track & field, volleyball and wrestling; and co-ed sports include cheerleading, eSports and shooting sports. The university expanded athletics in 2010 by adding men's ice hockey and women's wrestling.

=== Football ===
The Waldorf Warriors football team represents the university in college football.

=== Men's soccer ===
The Waldorf Warriors men's soccer team represents the university in college soccer. It won the Association of Independence Institutions (AII) conference championship, beating Georgia Gwinnett College in 2017 to claim its first conference title in the sport.

=== Cheerleading ===
The Waldorf Warriors cheerleaders are a competitive squad known for all-female stunting routines.

=== Ice hockey ===
The ice hockey team began play during the 2011–12 academic year and plays an independent schedule of club programs, as the NAIA does not currently sponsor a championship for ice hockey. The DI program is coached by Cliff Cook and plays with home ice at the Mason City Arena and the DII program is coached by Sean Parker and plays in Albert Lea City Arena.

=== Women's wrestling ===
Waldorf launched Iowa's first collegiate women's wrestling program in 2010.

== Notable alumni ==
- Brad Anderson, Former CEO of Best Buy
- Bob Backlund, professional wrestler
- Ian Beckles, professional football player
- Greg Davids, politician
- Rebecca Fjelland Davis, novelist and college instructor
- Karl Dehesa, professional basketball player
- Casey Klunder, college baseball coach
- Josh Neer, wrestler and mixed martial artist
- Henry Waechter, professional football player
