= Great Plains Athletic Conference =

Collegiate athletic conference

- Formerly: Nebraska Intercollegiate Athletic Conference (1969–1992); Nebraska-Iowa Athletic Conference (1992–2000)
- Association: NAIA
- Founded: 1969
- Commissioner: Corey Westra (since 2003)
- Sports fielded: 21; men's: 11; women's: 10
- No. of teams: 12
- Headquarters: Sioux City, Iowa
- Region: Midwestern United States
- Website: www.gpacsports.com

Locations
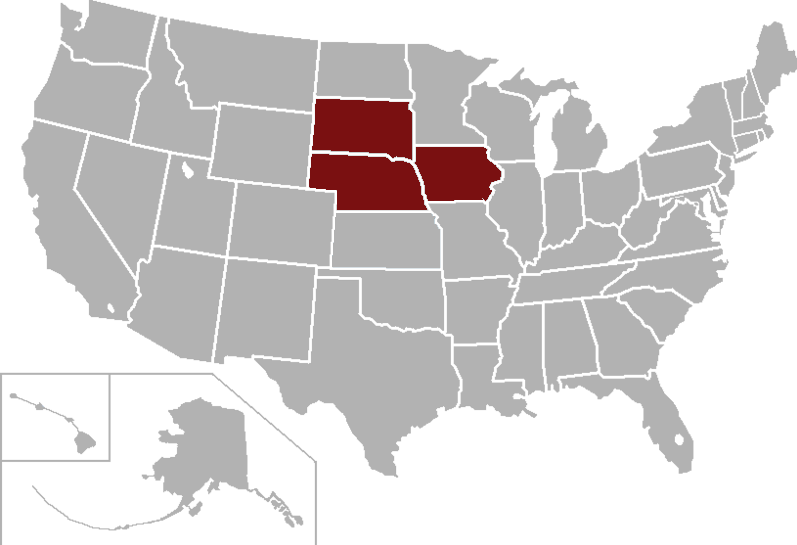

The Great Plains Athletic Conference (GPAC) is a college athletic conference affiliated with the National Association of Intercollegiate Athletics (NAIA). Member institutions are located in Iowa, Nebraska, and South Dakota. The conference was founded in 1969 as the Nebraska Intercollegiate Athletic Conference (NIAC), later becoming the Nebraska–Iowa Athletic Conference (1992) before being renamed the Great Plains Athletic Conference (2000).

== History ==
Great Plains Athletic Conference
Location of GPAC members: current

The Great Plains Athletic Conference was founded on September 22, 1969, as the Nebraska Intercollegiate Athletic Conference (NIAC). The first president of the conference was Art Nicolia (NWU) while Glen Hinkle (Doane) was the vice president and Roger Olsen (Dana) was the secretary/treasure. Jack Anderson (NWU) was named the first publicist on February 28, 1970. The six charter members were Concordia University, Dana College, Doane University, Hastings College, Midland University, and Nebraska Wesleyan University. With the addition of Northwestern College in 1992, the NIAC was renamed the Nebraska–Iowa Athletic Conference. The NIAC became the Great Plains Athletic Conference in 2000 with the addition of Dakota Wesleyan University, Dordt University, Mount Marty University, and the University of Sioux Falls. Later, Briar Cliff University and Morningside University joined the GPAC in 2002 and 2003 respectively. The College of Saint Mary, a women's only institution, joined in 2015. In 2018, University of Jamestown joined the conference as a full-member, while Presentation College joined the conference as an associate member. All former members of the NIAC remain affiliated with the GPAC except for Dana College, which closed in 2010, the University of Sioux Falls, which left the conference in 2011, and Nebraska Wesleyan University, which left the conference in 2016. Paul Clark was the commissioner of the GPAC when it formed in 2000. Corey Westra in Sioux City, Iowa, is the current commissioner of the league.

On January 17, 2023, Presentation College ended its affiliate status with the GPAC as it closed effective October 31, 2023.

On September 18, 2023, the GPAC had extended an invitation to Waldorf University as their newest full member of the conference, effective beginning the 2024–25 academic year; although at that moment, the university was already an affiliate member in both men's and women's soccer.

=== Chronological timeline ===
- 1969 – On September 22, 1969, the Great Plains Athletic Conference (GPAC) was founded as the Nebraska Intercollegiate Athletic Conference (NIAC). Charter members included Concordia Teachers College (now Concordia University of Nebraska), Dana College, Doane College (now Doane University), Hastings College, Midland Lutheran College (now Midland University) and Nebraska Wesleyan University, beginning the 1969–70 academic year.
- 1992 – Northwestern College of Iowa joined the NIAC. Therefore, the NIAC has been rebranded as the Nebraska-Iowa Athletic Conference (NIAC), beginning the 1992–93 academic year.
- 2000 – Dakota Wesleyan University, Dordt College (now Dordt University), Mount Marty College (now Mount Marty University) and the University of Sioux Falls joined the NIAC. Therefore, the NIAC has been rebranded as the Great Plains Athletic Conference (GPAC), beginning the 2000–01 academic year.
- 2002 – Briar Cliff College (now Briar Cliff University) joined the GPAC in the 2002–03 academic year.
- 2003 – Morningside College (now Morningside University) joined the GPAC in the 2003–04 academic year.
- 2010 – Dana left the GPAC as the school announced that it would close after the 2009–10 academic year.
- 2011 – Sioux Falls left the GPAC and the NAIA for the Division II ranks of the National Collegiate Athletic Association (NCAA) as an NCAA D-II Independent (which would later join the Northern Sun Intercollegiate Conference (NSIC), beginning the 2012–13 school year) after the 2010–11 academic year.
- 2015 – The College of Saint Mary joined the GPAC in the 2015–16 academic year.
- 2016 – Nebraska Wesleyan left the GPAC and the NAIA to fully align in the NCAA Division III ranks (during that time, they held dual membership with both the NAIA and the NCAA), primarily competing as a member of the Iowa Intercollegiate Athletic Conference (IIAC; now known as the American Rivers Conference) after the 2015–16 academic year.
- 2018:
  - The University of Jamestown joined the GPAC in the 2018–19 academic year.
  - Presentation College joined the GPAC as an affiliate member for men's and women's soccer in the 2018 fall season (2018–19 academic year).
- 2020 – Ottawa University joined the GPAC as an affiliate member for men's volleyball in the 2021 fall season (2020–21 academic year).
- 2021 – Central Christian College of Kansas and Kansas Wesleyan University joined the GPAC as affiliate members for men's volleyball in the 2022 fall season (2021–22 academic year).
- 2023:
  - Presentation left the GPAC as an affiliate member for men's and women's soccer as the school ceased operations after the 2022–23 academic year.
  - Waldorf University joined the GPAC as an affiliate member in both men's and women's soccer in the 2023–24 academic year.
- 2024:
  - Jamestown was removed from the GPAC after the 2023–24 academic year due to their pursuit of a move to the NCAA Division II ranks; which subsequently rejoined the North Star Athletic Association (NSAA) (which they were members prior to joining the GPAC) for the 2024–25 school year.
  - Central Christian (Ks.), Kansas Wesleyan and Ottawa left the GPAC as affiliate members for men's volleyball after the 2024 spring season (2023–24 academic year); as the conference announced that it had discontinued the sport, while replacing it with women's wrestling.
  - Waldorf joined the GPAC as a full member for all sports in the 2024–25 academic year.

== Member schools ==
=== Current members ===
The GPAC currently has 12 full members, all are private schools:

Institution	Location	Founded	Affiliation	Enrollment	Nickname	Joined (Note: Represents the calendar year when fall sports competition begins.)
Briar Cliff University	Sioux City, Iowa	1930	Catholic (Franciscan)	940	Chargers	2002
Concordia University, Nebraska	Seward, Nebraska	1894	Lutheran LCMS	3,423	Bulldogs	1969
Dakota Wesleyan University	Mitchell, South Dakota	1885	United Methodist	886	Tigers	2000
Doane University	Crete, Nebraska	1872	United Church of Christ	1,948	Tigers	1969
Dordt University	Sioux Center, Iowa	1955	Christian Reformed	1,929	Defenders	2000
Hastings College	Hastings, Nebraska	1882	Presbyterian; Presbyterian Church (USA)	1,011	Broncos	1969
Midland University	Fremont, Nebraska	1883	Lutheran ELCA	1,557	Warriors	1969
Morningside University	Sioux City, Iowa	1894	United Methodist	2,158	Mustangs	2003
Mount Marty University	Yankton, South Dakota	1936	Catholic (Benedictines)	1,314	Lancers	2000
Northwestern College	Orange City, Iowa	1882	Reformed	1,665	Red Raiders	1992
College of Saint Mary (Note: This institution is a women's college, therefore it does not compete in men's sports.)	Omaha, Nebraska	1923	Catholic (R.S.M.)	733	Flames	2015
Waldorf University (Note: Waldorf previously competed in the GPAC as an affiliate member in both men's and women's soccer during the 2023 fall season (2023–24 academic year).)	Forest City, Iowa	1903	Lutheran (Independent)	2,657	Warriors	2024

=== Former members ===
The GPAC had four former full members, all were private schools:

Institution	Location	Founded	Affiliation	Enrollment	Nickname	Joined (Note: Represents the calendar year when fall sports competition begins.)	Left (Note: Represents the calendar year when spring sports competition ends.)	Subsequent conference	Current conference
Dana College	Blair, Nebraska	1884	Lutheran ELCA	N/A	Vikings	1969	2010	Closed in 2010	
Nebraska Wesleyan University	Lincoln, Nebraska	1887	United Methodist	1,690	Prairie Wolves	1969	2016 (Note: Nebraska Wesleyan was also an NCAA D-III Independent from 1982–83 to 2015–16, therefore it help dual membership with the NAIA and the NCAA.)	American Rivers (ARC) (Note: Currently an NCAA Division III athletic conference.) (2016–present)	
University of Jamestown	Jamestown, North Dakota	1883	Presbyterian (PCUSA)	1,215	Jimmies	2018	2024	North Star (NSAA) (2024–25)	Northern Sun (NSIC) (Note: Currently an NCAA Division II athletic conference.) (2025–present)
University of Sioux Falls	Sioux Falls, South Dakota	1883	Baptist	1,509	Cougars	2000	2011	NAIA/D-II Independent (2011–12)	Northern Sun (NSIC) (2012–present)

=== Former affiliate members ===
The GPAC has five former affiliate members, all of which were private schools:

Institution	Location	Founded	Affiliation	Enrollment	Nickname	Joined (Note: Represents the calendar year when fall sports competition begins.)	Left (Note: Represents the calendar year when spring sports competition end.)	GPAC sport(s)	Current primary conference	Conference in former GPAC sport(s)
Central Christian College of Kansas	McPherson, Kansas	1884	Free Methodist	455	Tigers	2021	2024	Men's volleyball	Sooner (SAC)	California Pacific (CalPac)
Kansas Wesleyan University	Salina, Kansas	1886	United Methodist	951	Coyotes	2021	2024	Men's volleyball	Kansas (KCAC)	Heart of America (HAAC)
Ottawa University	Ottawa, Kansas	1865	Baptist	1,055	Braves	2020	2024	Men's volleyball	Kansas (KCAC)	Heart of America (HAAC)
Presentation College	Aberdeen, South Dakota	1922	Catholic (P.B.V.M.)	N/A	Saints	2018	2023	Men's soccer	Closed in 2023 (Note: At the time of the school's tenure as an affiliate member within the GPAC, Presentation competed as a full member of the North Star Athletic Association (NSAA) from 2013–14 to 2022–23.)	
Presentation College	Aberdeen, South Dakota	1922	Catholic (P.B.V.M.)	N/A	Saints	2018	2023	Women's soccer	Closed in 2023	
Waldorf University	Forest City, Iowa	1903	For-profit	2,657	Warriors	2023	2024 (Note: Waldorf became a full member of the GPAC effective the 2024–25 school year.)	Men's soccer	Great Plains (GPAC) (2024–present)	
Waldorf University	Forest City, Iowa	1903	For-profit	2,657	Warriors	2023	2024	Women's soccer	Great Plains (GPAC) (2024–present)	

=== Membership timeline ===
Full member (all sports) Full member (non-football) Associate member (sport)

== Sponsored sports ==
=== Men's sponsored sports by school ===
School	Baseball	Basketball	Cross Country	Football	Golf	Soccer	Tennis	Track & Field (indoor)	Track & Field (outdoor)	Wrestling	Total
Briar Cliff	✓	✓	✓	✓	✓	✓	✗	✓	✓	✓	9
Concordia-Nebraska	✓	✓	✓	✓	✓	✓	✓	✓	✓	✓	10
Dakota Wesleyan	✓	✓	✓	✓	✓	✓	✗	✓	✓	✓	9
Doane	✓	✓	✓	✓	✓	✓	✓	✓	✓	✓	10
Dordt	✓	✓	✓	✓	✓	✓	✗	✓	✓	✗	8
Hastings	✓	✓	✓	✓	✓	✓	✓	✓	✓	✓	10
Midland	✓	✓	✓	✓	✓	✓	✓	✓	✓	✓	10
Morningside	✓	✓	✓	✓	✓	✓	✓	✓	✓	✓	10
Mount Marty	✓	✓	✓	✓	✓	✓	✓	✓	✓	✗	9
Northwestern College	✓	✓	✓	✓	✓	✓	✓	✓	✓	✓	10
Waldorf	✓	✓	✓	✓	✓	✓	✗	✓	✓	✓	9
Totals	11	11	11	11	11	11	7	11	11	9	104

=== Women's sponsored sports by school ===
School	Basketball	Cheer and Dance	Cross Country	Golf	Soccer	Softball	Tennis	Track & Field (indoor)	Track & Field (outdoor)	Volleyball	Total
Briar Cliff	✓	✓	✓	✓	✓	✓	✗	✓	✓	✓	9
Concordia-Nebraska	✓	✓	✓	✓	✓	✓	✓	✓	✓	✓	10
Dakota Wesleyan	✓	✓	✓	✓	✓	✓	✗	✓	✓	✓	9
Doane	✓	✓	✓	✓	✓	✓	✓	✓	✓	✓	10
Dordt	✓	✓	✓	✓	✓	✓	✗	✓	✓	✓	9
Hastings	✓	✓	✓	✓	✓	✓	✓	✓	✓	✓	10
Midland	✓	✓	✓	✓	✓	✓	✓	✓	✓	✓	10
Morningside	✓	✓	✓	✓	✓	✓	✓	✓	✓	✓	10
Mount Marty	✓	✓	✓	✓	✓	✓	✓	✓	✓	✓	10
Northwestern College	✓	✓	✓	✓	✓	✓	✓	✓	✓	✓	10
College of Saint Mary	✓	✓	✓	✓	✓	✓	✓	✓	✓	✓	10
Waldorf	✓	✓	✓	✓	✓	✓	✗	✓	✓	✓	9
Totals	12	12	12	12	12	12	8	12	12	12	116
