= List of Dakota State Trojans football seasons =

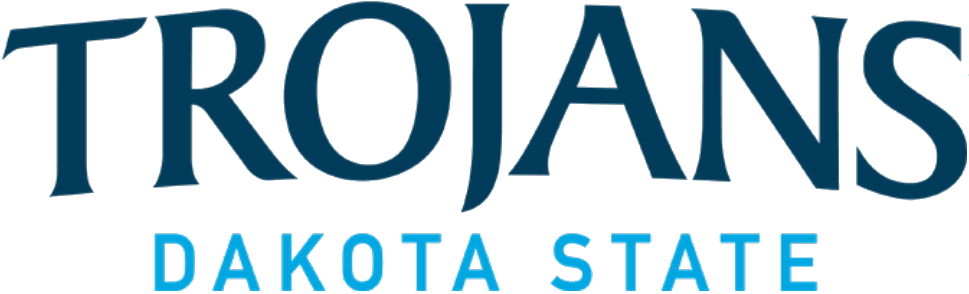

Dakota State University first fielded a football team in 1908. They participated as members of the South Dakota Intercollegiate Conference from 1917–2000, then as members of the Dakota Athletic Conference from 2000–2011, then they were an NAIA independent from 2011–2013, then they served as founding members of the North Star Athletic Association in 2013 and stayed in that conference until its closure in 2025, and finally they joined the Frontier Conference as members of the East Division in 2025.

The Trojans have accumulated an overall record of 329–523–15 and have won 5 conference championships and 1 bowl game.

== Seasons ==
Year	Coach	Overall	Conference	Standing	Bowl/playoffs	NAIA^{#}
Charles C. Wagner (South Dakota Intercollegiate Conference) (1923)
1923	Eastern Normal	1–5	1–5	8th		
George E. Thompson (South Dakota Intercollegiate Conference) (1924–1927)
1924	Eastern Normal	2–5	2–4	7th		
1925	Eastern Normal	4–3	4–3	7th		
1926	Eastern Normal	3–4–1	3–4	7th		
1927	Eastern Normal	0–6–1	0–5–1	11th		
J. Elbridge Curtis (South Dakota Intercollegiate Conference) (1928–1930)
1928	Eastern Normal	2–6	1–5	10th		
1929	Eastern Normal	2–6	1–6	8th		
1930	Eastern Normal	2–2–2	2–2–1	6th		
unknown (South Dakota Intercollegiate Conference) (1931–1932)
1931	Eastern Normal	0–3–1	0–3–1	10th		
1932	Eastern Normal	1–4	0–4	9th		
Chuck Reynolds (South Dakota Intercollegiate Conference) (1933–1941)
1933	Eastern Normal	3–2–1	2–2	6th		
1934	Eastern Normal	1–4	0–4	9th		
1935	Eastern Normal	0–5	0–4	9th		
1936	Eastern Normal	0–5	0–4	9th		
1937	Eastern Normal	1–5	0–3	10th		
1938	Eastern Normal	1–6	0–3	9th		
1939	Eastern Normal	0–4–1	0–2	10th		
1940	Eastern Normal	1–5	1–2	4th		
1941	Eastern Normal	1–4	1–2	4th		
Bill Bulfer (South Dakota Intercollegiate Conference) (1946–1954)
1946	Eastern Normal	0–5	0–3	5th		
1947	General Beadle	2–5	1–2	4th		
1948	General Beadle	4–3–1	2–2–1	4th		
1949	General Beadle	2–7	1–5	8th		
1950	General Beadle	4–2	3–2	5th		
1951	General Beadle	1–5	1–4	7th		
1952	General Beadle	1–4	1–4	8th		
1953	General Beadle	0–6	0–5	9th		
1954	General Beadle	1–6	0–6	9th		
Neal Tremble (South Dakota Intercollegiate Conference) (1955)
1955	General Beadle	1–6	0–6	8th		
Homer Englehorn (South Dakota Intercollegiate Conference) (1956–1961)
1956	General Beadle	3–4–1	1–3–1	7th		
1957	General Beadle	6–1–1	4–1	3rd		
1958	General Beadle	2–6	2–6	7th		
1959	General Beadle	5–2–1	5–2–1	3rd		
1960	General Beadle	2–6–1	0–5–1	T-6th		
1961	General Beadle	2–7	0–6	7th		
George Blankley (South Dakota Intercollegiate Conference) (1962–1969)
1962	General Beadle	5–4	3–3	T-3rd		
1963	General Beadle	3–5	2–4	5th		
1964	General Beadle	1–7	1–5	T-6th		
1965	General Beadle	6–3	4–2	T-2nd		
1966	General Beadle	5–4	3–3	4th		
1967	General Beadle	4–5	2–4	T-4th		
1968	General Beadle	2–5–1	1–4–1	6th		
1969	Dakota State	1–7	1–5	6th		
Lee Moran (South Dakota Intercollegiate Conference) (1970–1972)
1970	Dakota State	5–4	3–3	4th		
1971	Dakota State	9–2	4–2	2nd	w Boot Hill Bowl	12
1972	Dakota State	4–5	3–3	T-3rd		
Joel Swisher (South Dakota Intercollegiate Conference) (1973–1976)
1973	Dakota State	6–3	5–0	1st		17
1974	Dakota State	6–4	3–2	T-3rd		
1975	Dakota State	6–3–1	4–1	T-1st		
1976	Dakota State	8–2	4–1	T-1st		9
Gary Buer (South Dakota Intercollegiate Conference) (1977–1978)
1977	Dakota State	10–0	5–0	1st		6
1978	Dakota State	8–2	6–0	1st		20
unknown (South Dakota Intercollegiate Conference) (1979–1980)
1979	Dakota State	7–3	5–1	2nd		
1980	Dakota State	5–4	3–3	4th		
Tom Shea (South Dakota Intercollegiate Conference) (1981–1983)
1981	Dakota State	3–7	2–4	5th		
1982	Dakota State	5–5	4–3	4th		
1983	Dakota State	5–4–1	5–1–1	2nd		
Al Weisbecker (South Dakota Intercollegiate Conference) (1984)
1984	Dakota State	2–4	2–6	5th		
Larry Traetow (South Dakota Intercollegiate Conference) (1985–1988)
1985	Dakota State	0–10	0–6	6th		
1986	Dakota State	1–9	1–4	6th		
1987	Dakota State	0–10	0–5	6th		
1988	Dakota State	1–9	0–5	6th		
Gary Roach (South Dakota Intercollegiate Conference) (1989–1995)
1989	Dakota State	1–9	0–5	6th		
1990	Dakota State	4–5	1–4	5th		
1991	Dakota State	8–3	3–2	3rd		
1992	Dakota State	5–5	1–4	5th		
1993	Dakota State	8–2	4–1	2nd		25
1994	Dakota State	3–7	1–4	T-5th		
1995	Dakota State	1–9	1–4	T-4th		
Scott Hoffman (South Dakota Intercollegiate Conference) (1996–1999)
1996	Dakota State	2–7	1–5	6th		
1997	Dakota State	2–8	1–5	6th		
1998	Dakota State	7–3	3–2	3rd		
1999	Dakota State	5–5	3–2	3rd		
Marc Bergan (Dakota Athletic Conference) (2000–2001)
2000	Dakota State	3–7	3–6	T-7th		
2001	Dakota State	2–8	2–7	T-7th		
Gene Wockenfuss (Dakota Athletic Conference) (2002–2003)
2002	Dakota State	1–9	1–8	10th		
2003	Dakota State	2–8	2–7	9th		
Nate Holtz (Dakota Athletic Conference) (2004–2006)
2004	Dakota State	4–6	3–6	8th		
2005	Dakota State	4–6	3–4	4th		
2006	Dakota State	3–8	2–5	6th		
Tom Shea (Dakota Athletic Conference) (2007–2008)
2007	Dakota State	3–6	2–5	6th		
2008	Dakota State	3–7	1–6	7th		
Josh Anderson (Dakota Athletic Conference) (2009–2010)
2009	Dakota State	2–7	2–6	7th		
2010	Dakota State	0–10	0–8	8th		
Josh Anderson (NAIA independent) (2011–2012)
2011	Dakota State	1–10				
2012	Dakota State	2–9				
Josh Anderson (North Star Athletic Association) (2013–2024)
2013	Dakota State	2–8	2–2	T–3rd		
2014	Dakota State	6–5	2–4	5th		
2015	Dakota State	6–5	4–2	T–2nd		
2016	Dakota State	6–4	3–3	T–3rd		
2017	Dakota State	8–3	6–2	2nd		23
2018	Dakota State	3–8	2–5	5th		
2019	Dakota State	5–5	3–4	4th		
2020	Dakota State	4–5	4–5	4th		
2021	Dakota State	6–4	5–3	T–3rd		
2022	Dakota State	6–4	4–2	T–2nd		
2023	Dakota State	1–9	1–7	5th		
2024	Dakota State	6–4	4–4	2nd		
Josh Anderson (Frontier Conference) (2025–present)
2025	Dakota State	8–2	5–1	2nd (East)		25
2026	Dakota State	7–4	3–3	T–4th (East)		
Total:		329–523–15				
National championship Conference title Conference division title or championship game berth
^{†}Indicates Bowl Coalition, Bowl Alliance, BCS, or CFP / New Years' Six bowl.; ^{#}Rankings from final Coaches Poll.
