= Missouri River Shootout =

American college football trophy

- Sport: Football
- Teams: Dakota State; Black Hills State
- First meeting: September 18, 2004; Dakota State 27, Black Hills State 17
- Latest meeting: October 2, 2010; Black Hills State 14, Dakota State 9

Statistics
- Total meetings: 7
- All-time series: Black Hills State leads, 6–1 (.857)
- Largest victory: Black Hills State, 44–7 (2009)
- Longest win streak: Black Hills State, 6 (2005–2010)
- Current win streak: Black Hills State, 6 (2005–2010)

Locations of Dakota State and Black Hills State

The Missouri River Shootout was a traveling trophy continuously awarded to the winner of the American college football rivalry game between the Dakota State Trojans and the Black Hills State Yellow Jackets. When the traveling trophy was still active, both teams were members of the Dakota Athletic Conference. The Trojans currently are members of the Frontier Conference and the Yellow Jackets are currently members of the Rocky Mountain Athletic Conference.

The trophy is named after the Missouri River, which splits the state of South Dakota in half. Black Hills State University is located in Spearfish, South Dakota, which sits on the west side of the river. Dakota State University is located in Madison, South Dakota, which sits on the east side of the river.

== Series history ==
The Black Hills State Yellow Jackets currently hold an all-time series lead of 44–23–2. However, the Missouri River Shootout traveling trophy wasn't introduced until the 2004 season. In May 2011, it was announced that Black Hills State would transitioning to the NCAA Division II and joining the Rocky Mountain Athletic Conference, which ended the traveling trophy as both teams no longer played on a regular basis.

=== Notable games ===
September 18, 2004: This marked the first Missouri River Shootout traveling trophy game. It was also Dakota State's only win in the trophy's history.

September 26, 2009: This game marked the highest margin of victory (37 points) in the trophy's history.

== Game results ==
Dakota State victories	Black Hills State victories	Tie games

No.	Date	Location	Winner	Score
1	September 18, 2004	Lyle Hare Stadium	Dakota State	27–17
2	September 17, 2005	Trojan Field	Black Hills State	27–13
3	October 7, 2006	Trojan Field	Black Hills State	25–0
4	October 13, 2007	Lyle Hare Stadium	Black Hills State	22–7
5	October 4, 2008	Lyle Hare Stadium	Black Hills State	37–14
6	September 26, 2009	Trojan Field	Black Hills State	44–7
7	October 2, 2010	Lyle Hare Stadium	Black Hills State	14–9
Series: Black Hills State leads 6–1

=== Wins by location ===
Category	Dakota State	Black Hills State
Madison, SD	0	3
Spearfish, SD	1	3
