= Dakota State Trojans =

- University: Dakota State University
- Nickname: Trojans
- Association: NAIA
- Conference: Frontier Conference
- Athletic director: Bud Postma
- Location: Madison, South Dakota
- Varsity teams: 11
- Football stadium: Brian Kern Family Stadium
- Basketball arena: DSU Fieldhouse
- Baseball stadium: Flynn Field
- Softball stadium: Thue Field
- Outdoor track and field venue: Dan Beacom Track Complex
- Colors: Trojan blue, DSU blue, and gray
- Website: www.dsuathletics.com
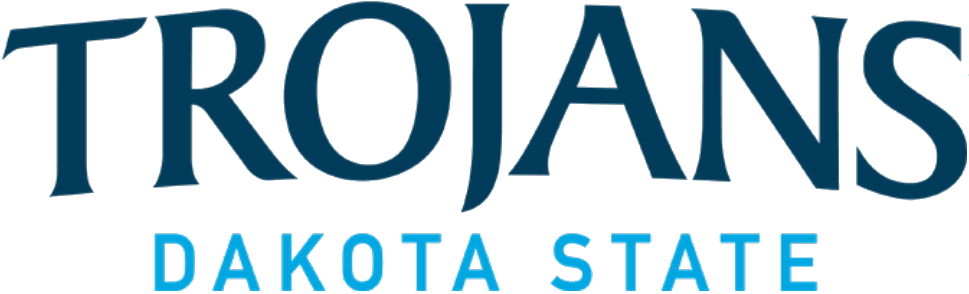

The Dakota State Trojans are the athletic teams that represent Dakota State University (DSU), located in Madison, South Dakota. The Trojans compete at the National Association of Intercollegiate Athletics (NAIA) level as a member of the North Star Athletic Association. The Trojans previously competed in the South Dakota Intercollegiate Conference (SDIC) from 1917–18 to 1999–2000, then in the Dakota Athletic Conference (DAC) from 2000–01 to 2010–11. During the 2025–26 academic year, Dakota State will be joining the Frontier Conference. Dakota State's main rivalry is with the Dakota Wesleyan Tigers.

== Sports sponsored ==
Men's sports	Women's sports
Baseball	Basketball
Basketball	Cross country
Cross country	Soccer
Football	Softball
Track and field^{1}	Track and field^{1}
	Volleyball
^{1} includes both indoor and outdoor.

== Former sports ==
- Men's Tennis (1966–1983, 1995–1998)
- Women's Tennis (1904–1931)
- Men's Wrestling (1961–1982)
- Women's Field Hockey (1965–1972)
- Women's Golf (1981–1983)
- Women's Gymnastics (1965–1966)

== Conference affiliations ==
NAIA

- South Dakota Intercollegiate Conference (1917–2000)
- Dakota Athletic Conference (2000–2011)
- NAIA Independent (2011–2013)
- North Star Athletic Association (2013–2025)
- Frontier Conference (2025–)

== Facilities ==
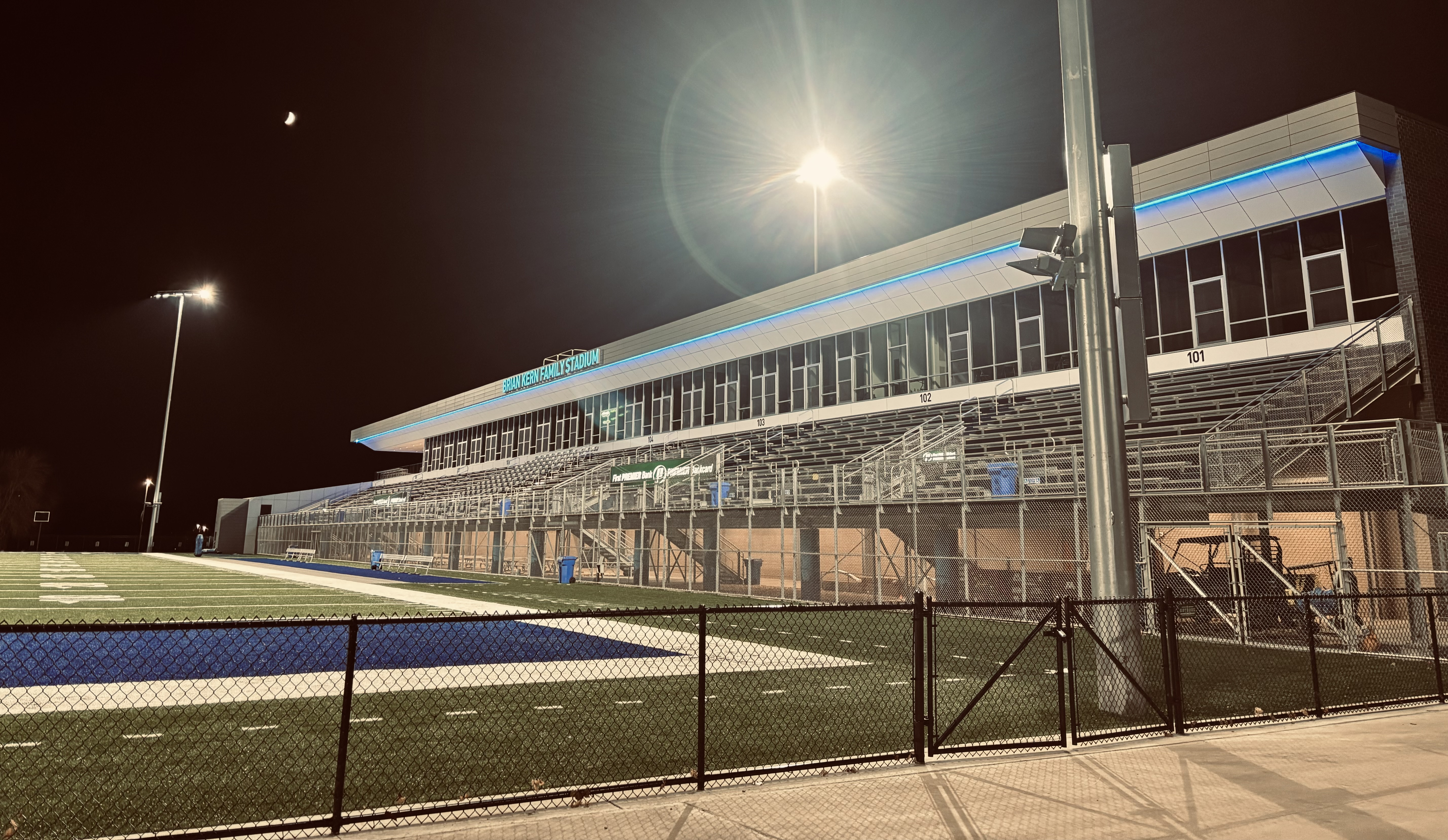
Brian Kern Family Stadium

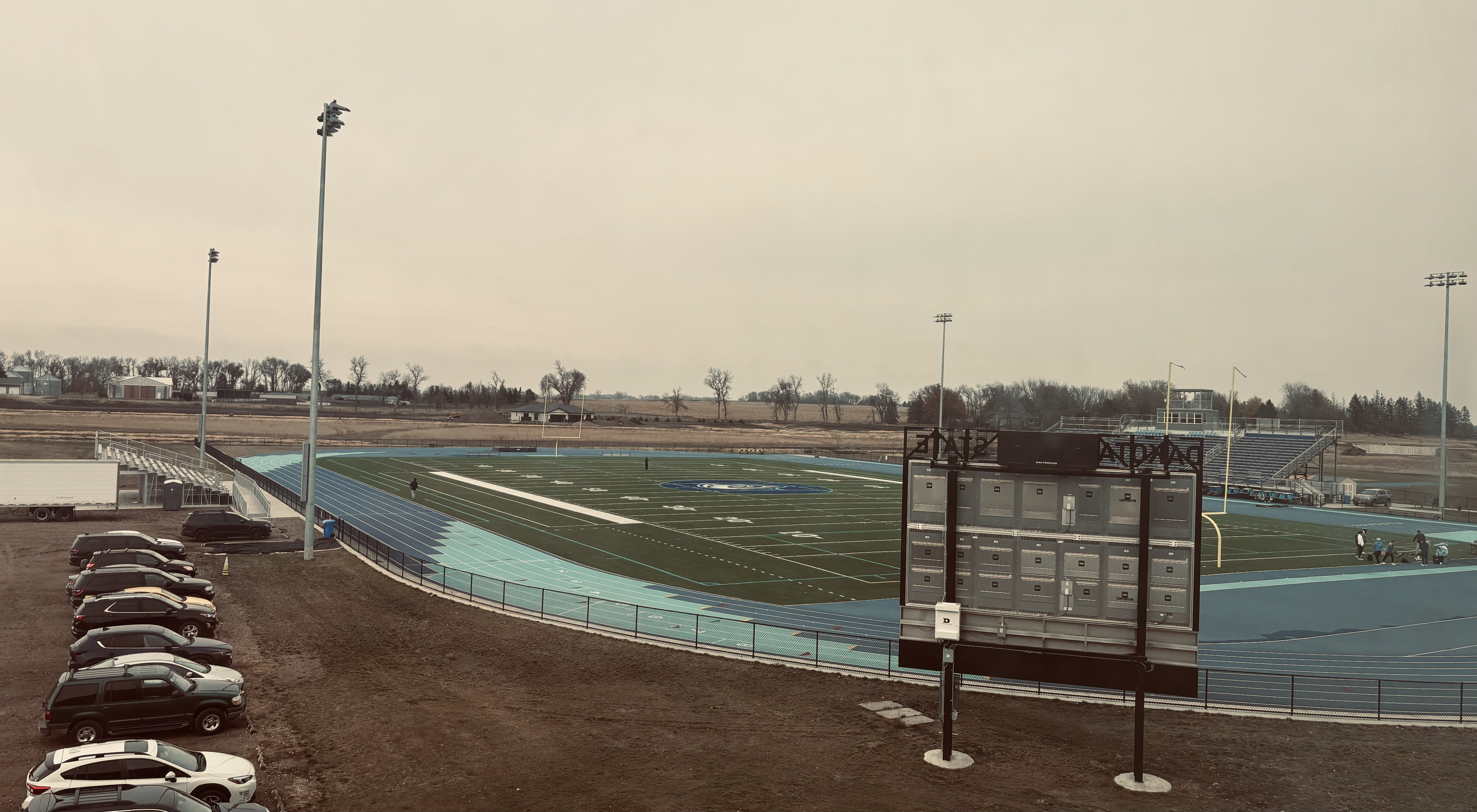
Dan Beacom Track Complex

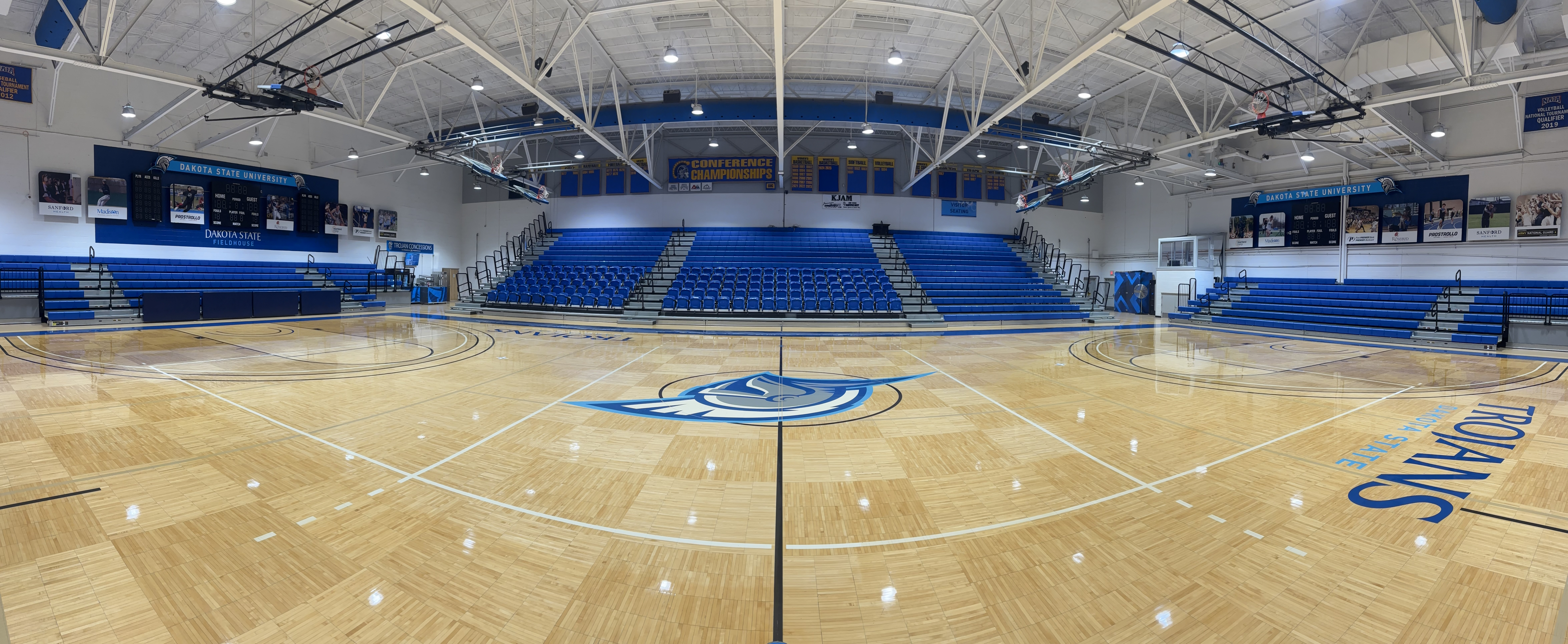
DSU Fieldhouse

Venue	Sport(s)	Ref.
Brian Kern Family Stadium (Note: Located at the "Beacom Premier Complex".)	Football	
DSU Fieldhouse	Basketball; Volleyball	
Flynn Field	Baseball	
Dan Beacom Track Complex	Track and field Soccer	
Thue Field	Softball	
Esports Center	eSports	

== Notable athletes ==
- Josh Anderson - head football coach at Dakota State University
- Tom Bailey - professional baseball pitcher for the Perth Heat
- Charlie Flohr - head football coach at the South Dakota School of Mines and Technology
- Pat Behrns - former head football coach at the University of Nebraska at Omaha
- Darwin Robinson - former running back for the Washington Redskins and the Seattle Seahawks
- Aaron Aylward - current member of the South Dakota House of Representatives
- Tommy Hofer - former wide receiver for the Toronto Argonauts, Sioux Falls Storm, and the Sioux City Bandits
- Anthony Drealan - former head coach of the track and field and cross country teams at Dakota State University
- Gene Wockenfuss - former athletic director and head football coach for the Dakota State Trojans
- Steve Kueter - former head football coach for O'Gorman Catholic High School

== Notable coaches ==
- Josh Anderson - current head football coach for the Dakota State Trojans
- Alex Kretzschmar - current head football coach for the Dakota Wesleyan Tigers
- Jon Anderson - current assistant defensive backs coach for the Old Dominion Monarchs
- Pat Behrns - former head football coach for the Nebraska–Omaha Mavericks and the North Dakota Fighting Sioux
- George Blankley - former head football coach for the Dakota State Trojans
- Gary Buer - former head football and baseball coach for the Dakota State Trojans
- Adam Dorrel - current head football coach for the Central Oklahoma Bronchos
- Rudy Gaddini - former head football coach for the Milton Wildcats
- Cory Miller - current head football coach for the Oklahoma Panhandle State Aggies
- Lee Moran - former head football coach for the Dakota State Trojans
- Tom Shea - current special adviser to the head coach for the Upper Iowa Peacocks
- Joel Swisher - former head football coach for the Dakota State Trojans, Augustana Vikings, Adams State Grizzlies, and Jamestown Jimmies
- Carson Walch - current director of player development for the Cleveland Browns
- Al Weisbecker - former head football coach for the Dakota State Trojans and the Black Hills State Yellow Jackets
- Rich Wright - current head football coach for the Northwest Missouri State Bearcats
- Darren Tighe - current head men's basketball coach for the Mary Marauders
- David Moe - current head coach for the Dakota State Trojans women's basketball team
- Anthony Drealan - former head coach of the track and field and cross country teams at Dakota State University
- Gary Garner - former head men's basketball coach for the Dakota State Trojans, Southeast Missouri State Redhawks, Fort Hays State Tigers, and the Drake Bulldogs
- Kevin Williamson - current head coach for the Dakota State Trojans men's basketball team
- Gene Wockenfuss - former athletic director and head football coach for the Dakota State Trojans
