= Ward H. Bell =

American football, basketball, and track coach

Biographical details
- Born: July 20, 1896; Kiowa, Oklahoma, U.S.
- Died: July 1976 (aged 79–80); Mesa, Arizona, U.S.

Coaching career (HC unless noted)

Football
- 1924–1925: Spearfish
- 1926–1931: Huron

Basketball
- 1924–1926: Spearfish

Track
- 1932: Huron

Head coaching record
- Overall: 14–40–8 (football); 16–2 (basketball)

Accomplishments and honors

Championships
- Football; 1 SDIC (1928)

Ward Horton Bell (July 20, 1896 – July, 1976) was an American football, basketball, and track coach. He served as the head football coach at Black Hills State University–then known as Spearfish Normal College–from 1924 to 1925. He also served as Spearfish's men's basketball coach from 1924 to 1926.

Ward moveded to Huron, South Dakota, where he served as the head football coach and track coach at Huron College.

== Head coaching record ==
=== Football ===
Year	Team	Overall	Conference	Standing	Bowl/playoffs
Spearfish Yellow Jackets (South Dakota Intercollegiate Conference) (1924–1925)
1924	Spearfish	1–6	0–4	T–9th	
1925	Spearfish	2–6–1	0–4–1	10th	
Spearfish:		3–12–1	0–8–1		
Huron Scalpers (South Dakota Intercollegiate Conference) (1926–1931)
1926	Huron	2–5	2–3	8th	
1927	Huron	3–5	2–3	T–6th	
1928	Huron	4–1–2	2–0–2	T–1st	
1929	Huron	0–8–1	0–4	T–9th	
1930	Huron	1–7	1–6	9th	
1931	Huron	1–2–4	1–1–4	T–4th	
Huron:		11–28–7	8–17–6		
Total:		14–40–8			
National championship Conference title Conference division title or championship game berth
