= Joel Swisher =

American football coach (1943–2000)

Biographical details
- Born: October 29, 1943; Hopkinsville, Kentucky, U.S.
- Died: February 17, 2000 (aged 56); Rochester, Minnesota, U.S.

Playing career

Football
- 1964–1967: Northern State

Football
- c. 1965: Northern State
- Position: Halfback (football)

Coaching career (HC unless noted)

Football
- c. 1970: South Dakota State (GA)
- 1972: Doane (DC)
- 1973–1976: Dakota State
- 1977–1980: Augustana (SD)
- 1982–1983: Adams State
- 1984–1986: Eastern Illinois (assistant)
- 1987–1988: Western Michigan (assistant)
- 1990–1991: New Mexico (RB)
- 1992–1994: Jamestown
- 1995–1999: Rochester (MN) / Rochester C&T

Track
- 1972–1973: Doane (assistant)

Administrative career (AD unless noted)
- 1974–1977: Dakota State

Head coaching record
- Overall: 65–55–4 (college football); 44–9 (junior college football)
- Bowls: 1–3 (junior college)
- Tournaments: 7–2 (MCCC playoffs)

Accomplishments and honors

Championships
- Football; 3 SDIC (1973, 1975–1976); 3 MCCC (1997–1999); 3 MCCC Northern Division (1995–1999)

Awards
- DSU Athletics Hall of Fame

Joel A. Swisher (October 29, 1943 – February 17, 2000) was an American college football coach and athletics administrator. He served as the head football coach at Dakota State University (1973–1976), Augustana College in Sioux Falls, South Dakota (1977–1980), Adams State College (1982–1983), and Jamestown College (1992–1994), compiling a career college football head coaching record of 65–55–4. Swisher was also the athletic director at Dakota State from 1974 to 1977.

== Early life, playing career, and education ==
Swisher was born on October 29, 1943, in Hopkinsville, Kentucky. He was the son of Clark Swisher, who was a longtime coach and athletic director at Northern State University in Aberdeen, South Dakota. The younger Swisher attended Northern State, where he lettered for four years in both football and basketball before graduating with a Bachelor of Science in secondary education. Swisher later earned a master's degree physical education from South Dakota State University, and, in 1972, a doctorate in health and physical education form the University of Utah.

== Coaching career ==
Swisher was hired in 1972 at Doane College—now known as Doane University—Crete, Nebraska, as an assistant coach in football and track and assistant professor of physical education. In 1973, he was hired as the head football coach at Dakota State University in Madison, South Dakota. The following year, he succeeded Neil Hattlestad at the school's athletic director.

Swisher was the 16th head football coach at Adams State College—now known as Adams State University—in Alamosa, Colorado, serving for two seasons, from 1982 to 1983, and compiling a record of 7–10–2 He was the head football coach at Jamestown College—now known as the University of Jamestown–in Jamestown, North Dakota for three seasons, from 1992 to 1994, tallying a mark of 15–12.

== Death ==
Swisher died on February 17, 2000, at St. Mary's Hospital in Rochester, Minnesota, after suffering a heart attack.

== Head coaching record ==
=== College football ===
| Year | Team | Overall | Conference | Standing | Bowl/playoffs |
|---|---|---|---|---|---|
Dakota State Trojans (South Dakota Intercollegiate Conference) (1973–1976)
| 1973 | Dakota State | 6–3 | 5–0 | 1st | |
| 1974 | Dakota State | 6–4 | 3–2 | T–3rd | |
| 1975 | Dakota State | 6–3–1 | 4–1 | T–1st | |
| 1976 | Dakota State | 8–2 | 4–1 | T–1st | |
| Dakota State: | | 26–12–1 | 16–4 | | |
Augustana (South Dakota) Vikings (North Central Conference) (1977–1980)
| 1977 | Augustana | 7–4 | 4–3 | T–2nd | |
| 1978 | Augustana | 4–5 | 2–4 | 6th | |
| 1979 | Augustana | 4–5 | 2–4 | 6th | |
| 1980 | Augustana | 2–7–1 | 2–5 | 6th | |
| Augustana: | | 17–21–1 | 10–16 | | |
Adams State Indians (Rocky Mountain Athletic Conference) (1982–1983)
| 1982 | Adams State | 3–4–2 | 3–3–2 | 4th | |
| 1983 | Adams State | 4–6 | 4–4 | T–4th | |
| Adams State: | | 7–10–2 | 7–7–2 | | |
Jamestown Jimmies (North Dakota College Athletic Conference) (1992–1994)
| 1992 | Jamestown | 5–4 | 2–3 | 4th | |
| 1993 | Jamestown | 4–5 | 1–4 | 5th | |
| 1994 | Jamestown | 6–3 | 3–2 | T–3rd | |
| Jamestown: | | 15–12 | 6–9 | | |
| Total: | | 65–55–4 | | | |
National championship Conference title Conference division title or championship game berth

=== Junior college football ===
| Year | Team | Overall | Conference | Standing | Bowl/playoffs |
|---|---|---|---|---|---|
Rochester Yellowjackets / Rochester C&T Yellowjackets (Minnesota Community College Conference) (1995–1999)
| 1995 | Rochester | 9–1 | 4–0 | 1st (Northern) | L MCCC Semifinal, W Iowa Bowl |
| 1996 | Rochester C&T | 8–2 | | 1st (Northern) | L MCCC Championship |
| 1997 | Rochester C&T | 10–1 | 4–0 | 1st (Northern) | W MCCC Championship, L Empire Bowl |
| 1998 | Rochester C&T | 7–4 | | 1st (Northern) | W MCCC Championship, L Iowa Bowl |
| 1999 | Rochester C&T | 10–1 | | 1st (Northern) | W MCCC Championship, L Iowa Bowl |
| Rochester: | | 44–9 | | | |
| Total: | | 44–9 | | | |
