= David Gassman =

American politician

Member of the South Dakota House of Representatives from the 8th district
- In office 2002–present

Personal details
- Born: May 22, 1949 (age 77) Mitchell, South Dakota
- Party: Democratic
- Spouse: Ronda
- Education: Dakota State University
- Profession: Educator, farmer

David B. "Dave" Gassman is a Democratic member of the South Dakota House of Representatives, representing the 8th district since 2002. Gassman graduated from Dakota State University in 1971. While there, he was a member of the Dakota State Trojans baseball team. He was inducted into the DSU Athletics Hall of Fame in 1995, the South Dakota Sports Hall of Fame in 2005, and the South Dakota Intercollegiate Conference Hall of Fame.
