= Darwin Robinson =

Profile
- Position: Running back

Personal information
- Born: Redfield, South Dakota, U.S.
- Listed height: 6 ft 1 in (1.85 m)
- Listed weight: 198 lb (90 kg)

Career information
- High school: Redfield
- College: Dakota State
- NFL draft: 1974: 8th round, 196th overall pick

Career history
- Washington Redskins (1974–1975); Seattle Seahawks (1976)

Awards and highlights
- South Dakota Sports Hall of Fame; NAIA All-American (1972); 2× All-SDIC (1972, 1973); Boot Hill Bowl champion (1971); SDIC champion (1973)

Darwin Keith Robinson is an American former professional football player who was a running back in the National Football League (NFL).

== Early life ==
Robinson attended Redfield High School in Redfield, South Dakota. He played collegiately at Dakota State University where he helped the Trojans win the Boot Hill Bowl in 1971, becoming the first collegiate team from South Dakota to ever win a postseason bowl game. He also helped lead the Trojans to their first ever conference championship in 1973. He was named an NAIA All-American in 1972, and earned All-SDIC honors in 1972 and 1973.

Robinson was also a member of the Dakota State Trojans track and field team.

Robinson graduated from Dakota State University in 1974.

== Professional career ==
Robinson was drafted 196th overall by the Washington Redskins in the eighth round of the 1974 NFL draft. He injured his ankle in a preseason scrimmage and spent his rookie year on the injured reserve list. Robinson spent two years with the Redskins before signing with the Seattle Seahawks in 1976. During his three years in the league he did not see the field in any regular season game and retired after the 1976 season due to injuries.
