= Gene Wockenfuss =

American football coach

Playing career
- 1970s–1980s: Dakota State

Coaching career (HC unless noted)
- 1990–1991: South Dakota State (GA)
- 1994–2001: Doane (assistant)
- 2002–2003: Dakota State

Administrative career (AD unless noted)
- 1994–2001: Doane (assistant AD)
- 2004: Dakota State (interim AD)
- 2004–2012: Dakota State

Head coaching record
- Overall: 3–17

Accomplishments and honors

Awards
- All-SDIC (1982)

Gene Roger Wockenfuss is an American former college football coach and athletic director, formerly the head coach and athletic director of the Dakota State Trojans.

== Early life, education, and career ==
Originally from Ipswich, South Dakota, Wockenfuss played football for the Dakota State Trojans in the late 1970s and early 1980s. While there, he earned a spot on the All-SDIC team in 1982. He graduated from Dakota State University with a bachelor's degree in 1983. Wockenfuss then spent time coaching at Polk-Hardville High School from 1983–1988 and Valley High School in Valley, Nebraska from 1989–1990. Wockenfuss then spent two seasons with the South Dakota State Jackrabbits as a graduate assistant during the 1991 and 1992 seasons. He then spent eight years as an assistant football coach and assistant athletic director at Doane University in Crete, Nebraska.

In 2002, Wockenfuss was hired as the next head coach of the Dakota State Trojans. He spent two seasons as head coach, accumulating an overall record of 3–17. In June 2004, he stepped down as head coach after being named the interim athletic director at Dakota State. He was named as the full time athletic director in December 2004, a role that he held until 2012.

== Personal life ==
Wockenfuss has since pursued a career in senior living, spending time as an executive director at several senior communities in Alabama, Texas, Florida, Nebraska, and Tennessee. He currently serves as interim administrator at Bethel Lutheran Home in Madison, South Dakota.

His son, Cody, played college football as a cornerback for the Chadron State Eagles from 2008–2012.

== Head coaching record ==
Year	Team	Overall	Conference	Standing	Bowl/playoffs
Dakota State Trojans (Dakota Athletic Conference) (2002–2003)
2002	Dakota State	1–9	1–8	10th	
2003	Dakota State	2–8	2–7	9th	
Dakota State:		3–17	3–15		
Total:		3–17			
