= DSU Fieldhouse =

Multi-purpose sports arena in South Dakota

Coordinates: 44°01′05″N 97°06′32″W

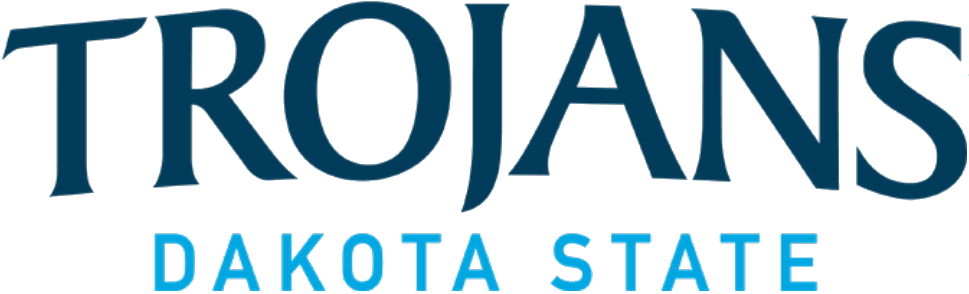

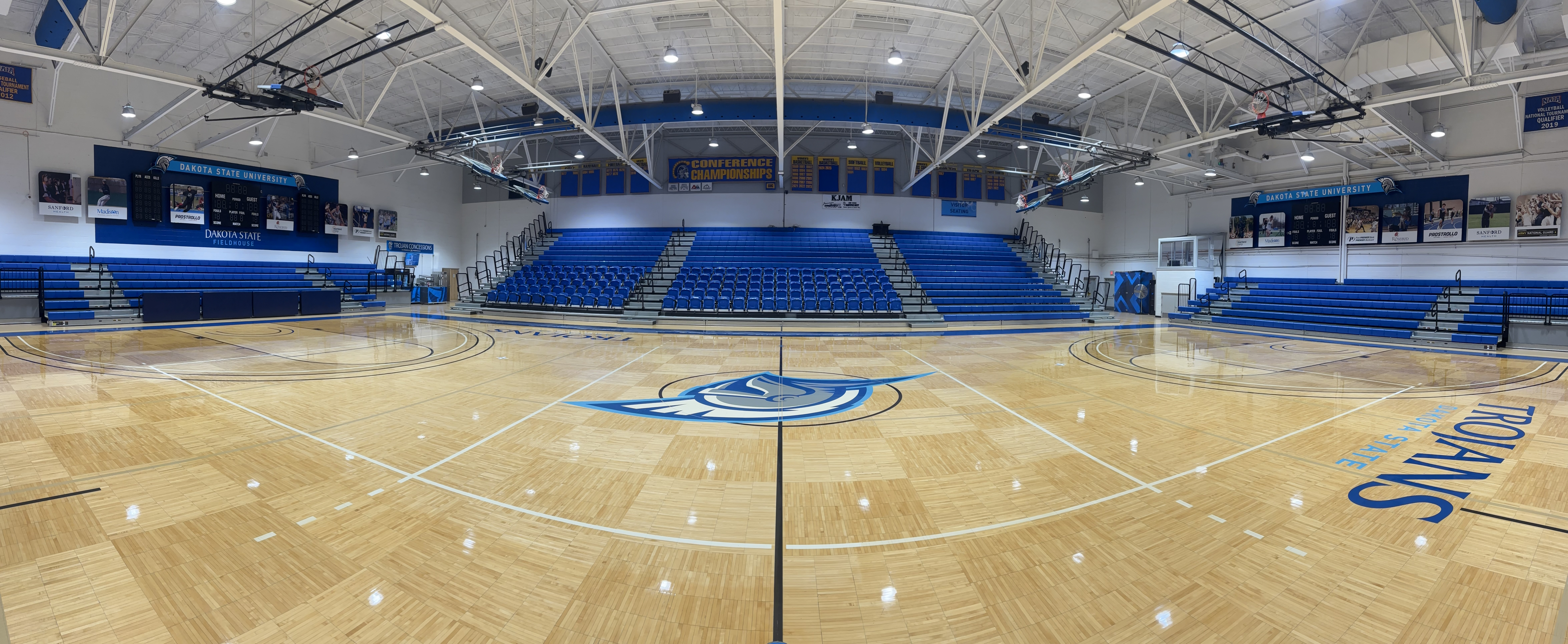
- Address: Madison, SD; United States
- Owner: Dakota State University
- Operator: DSU Athletics
- Type: Arena
- Current use: Basketball; Volleyball

Construction
- Opened: 1957; 69 years ago
- Renovated: 2014

Tenants
- Dakota State Trojans teams: basketball, volleyball

Website
- dsuathletics.com/fieldhouse

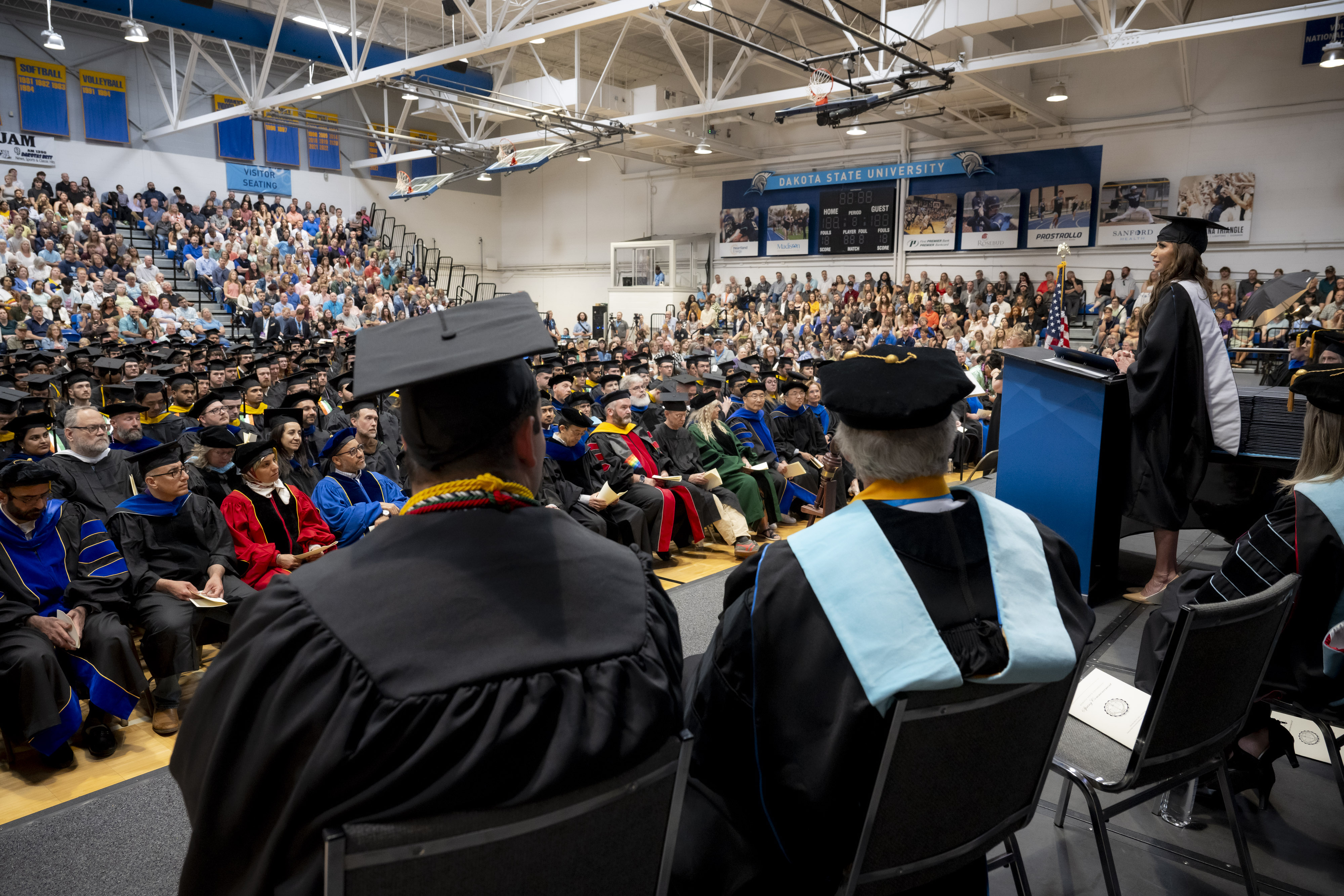
Former United States Department of Homeland Security Secretary Kristi Noem delivers keynote remarks during the 2025 Dakota State University commencement ceremony inside the DSU Fieldhouse.

The DSU Fieldhouse is a multi-purpose arena located in Madison, South Dakota. It was built in 1957. It is the home site for the Dakota State Trojans men's and women's basketball teams as well as the Trojan's volleyball team. It was built in conjunction with the National Guard.

== Madison Community Center ==
The Madison Community Center was built in 2000 and is attached to the DSU Fieldhouse.

== Renovations ==
In 2014, the DSU Fieldhouse was renovated. The updates included a new lobby walkway, new bleachers, new signage, new paint, resurfacing for the court, a new press box, and a lobby renovation.
