= Anthony Drealan =

Track and field coach

Biographical details
- Education: Dakota State University

Coaching career (HC unless noted)
- 2011–2025: Dakota State

Accomplishments and honors

Championships
- As a coach: 6 NSAA Men's Indoor Track and Field (2019–2020, 2022–2025); 5 NSAA Men's Outdoor Track and Field (2019, 2021–2024); 6 NSAA Men's Cross Country (2014, 2018–2022); 2 NSAA Women's Cross Country (2019, 2024); As an athlete: DAC Men's Cross Country (2009)

Awards
- DSU Athletics Hall of Fame; 5x NSAA Men's Cross Country Coach of the Year (2019–2020, 2022–2023, 2024); NSAA Women's Cross Country Coach of the Year (2024); 6x NSAA Men's Indoor Track and Field Coach of the Year (2019–2020, 2022–2025); 5x NSAA Men's Outdoor Track and Field Coach of the Year (2019, 2021–2024); NAIA Track and Field All-American (Distance Medley Relay) (2010); NAIA Cross Country All-American (2009)

Anthony Drealan is the former head coach of both the cross country and track and field teams at Dakota State University in Madison, South Dakota.

== Early life ==
Drealan is originally from Fulda, Minnesota. He joined the Dakota State track and field and cross country teams in 2006. While competing as a member of the Trojans, he earned DAC Men's Outdoor Track and Field All-Conference honors six times, DAC Men's Indoor Track and Field All-Conference honors once, and DAC Cross Country All-Conference honors twice. He was named as an NAIA Men's Cross Country All-American in 2009 and earned NAIA Men's Indoor Track and Field All-American honors in the distance medley relay in 2010.

While there he also helped Dakota State win their first ever DAC Cross Country championship in 2009.

Drealan graduated from Dakota State University in 2011 with a degree in business education.

== Coaching career ==
=== Dakota State ===
Drealan was named as the head coach for the Dakota State Trojans track and field and cross country teams in 2011.

In his time at Dakota State he won 6 NSAA Men's Indoor Track and Field championships, 5 NSAA Men's Outdoor Track and Field championships, 6 NSAA Men's Cross Country championships, and 2 NSAA Women's Cross Country championships. He was named as the NSAA Men's Cross Country Coach of the Year five times, NSAA Men's Indoor Track and Field Coach of the Year six times, NSAA Men's Outdoor Track and Field Coach of the Year five times, and NSAA Women's Cross Country Coach of the Year once.

On March 28, 2025, Drealan announced that he would be retiring from coaching at Dakota State following the 2025 outdoor track and field season. It was also announced that he'd be succeeded by Alex Glover, who had been an assistant under Drealan for the prior 12 seasons.

== Personal bests ==
Taken from TFRRS

Event	Time	Date	Venue
800m	2:01.83	April 1, 2010	Lillibridge Track Complex
1500m	3:56.36	?	?
5000m	15:00.34	May 6–7, 2011	Howard Wood Field
10,000m	30:41.33	April 27–30, 2011	Drake Stadium
3000S	9:23.03	April 16–17, 2010	Elwood Olsen Stadium

== Personal life ==
Drealan received a master's degree from Adams State University in 2013. He has a wife named Samantha and three sons named Westin, Harrison, and Finley.

== See also ==
- Dakota State Trojans track and field
