= Lee Moran (disambiguation) =

Lee Moran (1888–1961) was an American actor.

Lee Moran may also refer to:

- Lee Moran (TV personality), in Ex on the Beach
- Lee Moran (American football) (born 1943), American football player and coach
- Lee Moran, fictional character in Revenge
