= Tommy Hofer =

Profile
- Position: Wide receiver

Personal information
- Born: Lennox, South Dakota, U.S.
- Listed height: 5 ft 10 in (1.78 m)
- Listed weight: 185 lb (84 kg)

Career information
- High school: Lennox (Lennox, South Dakota)
- College: Dakota State

Career history
- Toronto Argonauts (2006); Sioux Falls Storm (2007); Sioux City Bandits (2008–2009)

Awards and highlights
- DSU Athletics Hall of Fame; DAC MVP (2005); First-team NAIA All–American (2005); 3x All-DAC (2003, 2004, 2005)

Tommy Hofer is an American former professional football player who was a wide receiver for the Toronto Argonauts, Sioux Falls Storm, and the Sioux City Bandits. He played college football for the Dakota State Trojans.

== Early life ==
Hofer grew up in Lennox, South Dakota and attended Lennox High School.

== College career ==
Hofer played collegiately at Dakota State University in Madison, South Dakota. He finished his career there with 256 receptions, 3,456 receiving yards, and 26 touchdowns. Hofer was a three-time All-Dakota Athletic Conference (DAC) selection (2003, 2004, 2005) and was named as an NAIA All-American three times, twice as an honorable mention (2003 and 2004) and once on the first team (2005). In 2005 was also named the DAC Most Valuable Player. He graduated from Dakota State University in 2005.

== Professional career ==
Hofer made the opening day roster of the Toronto Argonauts during the 2006 CFL season but was released soon after.

On January 29, 2007, it was announced that Hofer would be joining the Sioux Falls Storm who played in the UIF.

Hofer was a member of the Sioux City Bandits during the 2008 and 2009 seasons. During the 2008 season the Bandits played in the UIF and during the 2009 season they played in the IFL.
