= Al Weisbecker =

American football player and coach (1931–2017)

Biographical details
- Born: March 29, 1931; Aberdeen, South Dakota, U.S.
- Died: May 22, 2017 (aged 86); Madison, South Dakota, U.S.

Playing career
- 1951–1954: Northern State
- Position: Halfback

Coaching career (HC unless noted)
- 1967–1983: Dakota State (assistant)
- 1984: Dakota State
- 1985: Black Hills State (DC)
- 1986–1989: Black Hills State

Head coaching record
- Overall: 16–28

Accomplishments and honors

Championships
- 2 SDIC (1987, 1989)

Al Weisbecker (March 29, 1931 – May 22, 2017) was an American football player and coach. He served as the head football coach at Dakota State University in Madison, South Dakota in 1984 and at Black Hills State University in Spearfish, South Dakota from 1986 to 1989, compiling a career college football coaching record of 16–28.

== Head coaching record ==
Year	Team	Overall	Conference	Standing	Bowl/playoffs
Dakota State Trojans (South Dakota Intercollegiate Conference) (1984)
1984	Dakota State	2–6	2–4	T–4th	
Dakota State:		2–6	2–4		
Black Hills State Yellow Jackets (South Dakota Intercollegiate Conference) (1986–1989)
1986	Black Hills State	3–6	2–3	T–3rd	
1987	Black Hills State	4–5	4–1	T–1st	
1988	Black Hills State	3–6	3–2	T–2nd	
1989	Black Hills State	4–5	4–1	T–1st	
Dakota State:		14–22	13–7		
Total:		16–28			
National championship Conference title Conference division title or championship game berth
