= Lennox, South Dakota =

Lennox
- City
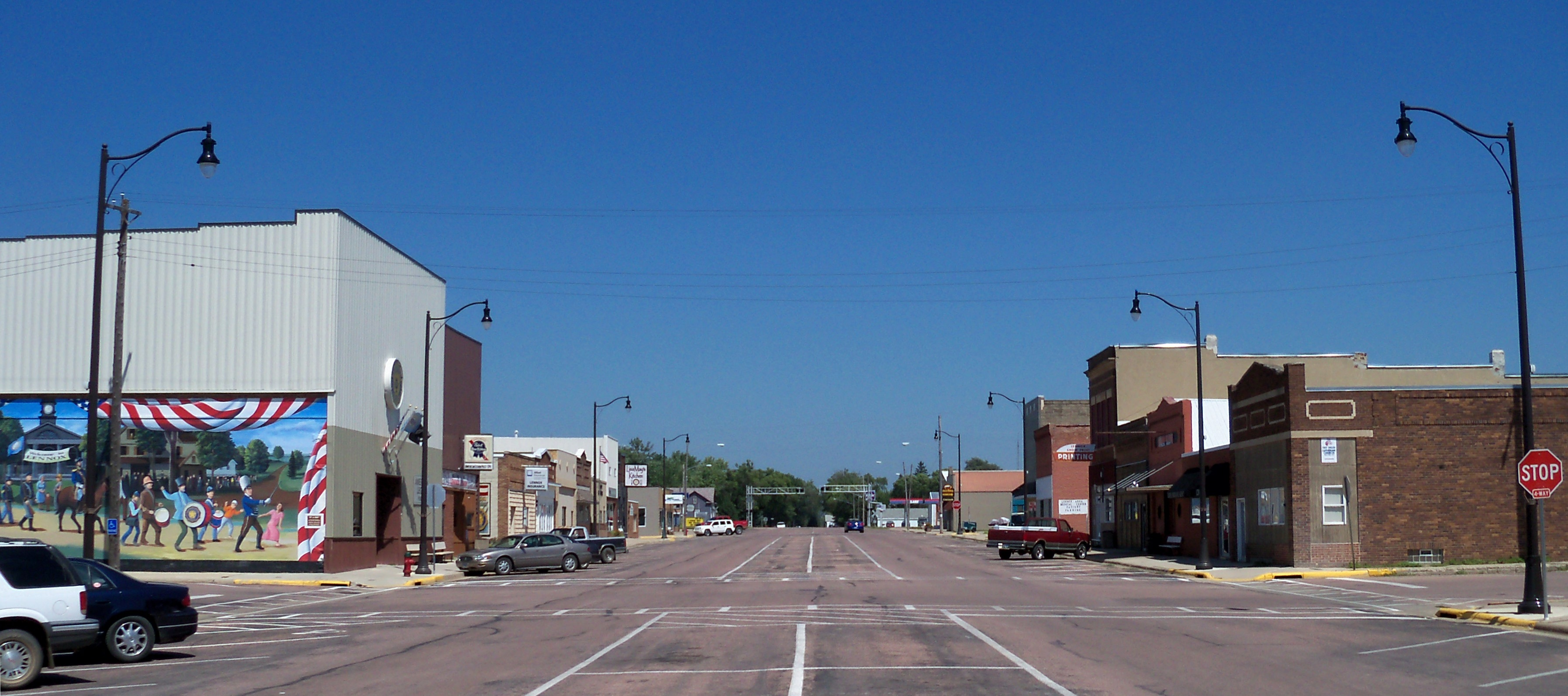
- Downtown Lennox, South Dakota

- Location in Lincoln County and the state of South Dakota
- Coordinates: 43°20′58″N 96°53′37″W
- Country: United States
- State: South Dakota
- County: Lincoln
- Founded: 1889
- Incorporated: May 19, 1889

Government
  - Mayor: Danny Fergen

Area
  - Total: 1.75 sq mi (4.52 km^{2})
  - Land: 1.75 sq mi (4.52 km^{2})
  - Water: 0 sq mi (0.00 km^{2})
- Elevation: 1,342 ft (409 m)

Population (2020)
  - Total: 2,423
  - Density: 1,387.8/sq mi (535.83/km^{2})
- Time zone: UTC–6 (Central (CST))
  - Summer (DST): UTC–5 (CDT)
- ZIP code: 57039
- Area code: 605
- FIPS code: 46-36380
- GNIS feature ID: 1267459
- Website: cityoflennoxsd.com

Lennox is a city in Lincoln County, South Dakota, United States, located 20 miles (32 km) southwest of Sioux Falls. The population was 2,423 at the 2020 census.

== History ==
The city was settled in 1879 and was named after Ben Lennox, private secretary to the general manager of the Milwaukee Railroad.

== Geography ==
According to the United States Census Bureau, the city has a total area of 1.31 square miles (3.39 km^{2}), all land.

== Demographics ==
Historical population
Census	Pop.	Note	%±
1880	89		—
1890	363		307.9%
1900	591		62.8%
1910	745		26.1%
1920	1,074		44.2%
1930	1,113		3.6%
1940	1,164		4.6%
1950	1,218		4.6%
1960	1,353		11.1%
1970	1,487		9.9%
1980	1,827		22.9%
1990	1,767		−3.3%
2000	2,037		15.3%
2010	2,111		3.6%
2020	2,423		14.8%
2022 (est.)	2,466		1.8%
U.S. Decennial Census; 2020 Census

=== 2020 census ===
As of the 2020 census, Lennox had a population of 2,423. The median age was 38.1 years. 26.6% of residents were under the age of 18 and 17.2% of residents were 65 years of age or older. For every 100 females there were 98.1 males, and for every 100 females age 18 and over there were 95.4 males age 18 and over.

0.0% of residents lived in urban areas, while 100.0% lived in rural areas.

There were 905 households in Lennox, of which 35.0% had children under the age of 18 living in them. Of all households, 52.5% were married-couple households, 17.8% were households with a male householder and no spouse or partner present, and 22.7% were households with a female householder and no spouse or partner present. About 27.0% of all households were made up of individuals and 12.4% had someone living alone who was 65 years of age or older.

There were 961 housing units, of which 5.8% were vacant. The homeowner vacancy rate was 2.0% and the rental vacancy rate was 5.5%.

Racial composition as of the 2020 census
Race	Number	Percent
White	2,246	92.7%
Black or African American	13	0.5%
American Indian and Alaska Native	39	1.6%
Asian	8	0.3%
Native Hawaiian and Other Pacific Islander	0	0.0%
Some other race	30	1.2%
Two or more races	87	3.6%
Hispanic or Latino (of any race)	55	2.3%

=== 2010 census ===
As of the census of 2010, there were 2,111 people, 842 households, and 542 families living in the city. The population density was 1,611.5 inhabitants per square mile (622.2/km^{2}). There were 914 housing units at an average density of 697.7 per square mile (269.4/km^{2}). The racial makeup of the city was 98.2% White, 0.1% African American, 0.6% Native American, 0.4% Asian, and 0.6% from two or more races. Hispanic or Latino of any race were 1.1% of the population.

There were 842 households, of which 33.4% had children under the age of 18 living with them, 52.5% were married couples living together, 7.8% had a female householder with no husband present, 4.0% had a male householder with no wife present, and 35.6% were non-families. 31.6% of all households were made up of individuals, and 14.2% had someone living alone who was 65 years of age or older. The average household size was 2.41 and the average family size was 3.02.

The median age in the city was 37.8 years. 26.4% of residents were under the age of 18; 6.7% were between the ages of 18 and 24; 27.2% were from 25 to 44; 23.7% were from 45 to 64; and 16% were 65 years of age or older. The gender makeup of the city was 49.4% male and 50.6% female.

=== 2000 census ===
As of the census of 2000, there were 2,037 people, 812 households, and 526 families living in the city. The population density was 1,863.8 inhabitants per square mile (719.6/km^{2}). There were 836 housing units at an average density of 764.9 per square mile (295.3/km^{2}). The racial makeup of the city was 98.67% White, 0.05% African American, 0.29% Native American, 0.05% Asian, 0.29% from other races, and 0.64% from two or more races. Hispanic or Latino of any race were 0.74% of the population.

There were 812 households, out of which 35.0% had children under the age of 18 living with them, 54.1% were married couples living together, 8.4% had a female householder with no husband present, and 35.2% were non-families. 31.9% of all households were made up of individuals, and 20.1% had someone living alone who was 65 years of age or older. The average household size was 2.42 and the average family size was 3.10.

In the city, the population was spread out, with 27.1% under the age of 18, 7.0% from 18 to 24, 27.9% from 25 to 44, 18.3% from 45 to 64, and 19.7% who were 65 years of age or older. The median age was 38 years. For every 100 females, there were 86.7 males. For every 100 females age 18 and over, there were 80.2 males.

As of 2000 the median income for a household in the city was $35,217, and the median income for a family was $46,848. Males had a median income of $30,758 versus $21,319 for females. The per capita income for the city was $15,940. About 2.7% of families and 3.4% of the population were below the poverty line, including 3.2% of those under age 18 and 7.4% of those age 65 or over.

== Education ==
Lennox is a part of the Lennox School District 41-4, which operates Lennox Elementary/LWC Intermediate, and LWC Junior High School/Lennox High School.

== Notable people ==
- Tommy Hofer, professional football player
- Arnold Kegel, gynecologist
