= Lennox School District 41-4 =

School District in South Dakota, USA

Address
- 305 West 5th Avenue Lennox, South Dakota, 57039; United States

District information
- Type: Public
- Grades: PreK–12
- NCES District ID: 4641550

Students and staff
- Students: 1,199
- Teachers: 74.91
- Staff: 70.38
- Student–teacher ratio: 16.01

Other information
- Website: www.lennox.k12.sd.us

Lennox School District 41-4 is a school district headquartered in Lennox, South Dakota. In addition to Lennox it includes Chancellor and Worthing.

== Boundary ==
In Lincoln County, it includes Lennox and Worthing. It also includes a portion in Turner County, where it includes Chancellor. Small portions are in Minnehaha County.

== Schools ==
- LWC JH & Lennox HS - Lennox
- Lennox Elementary School/LWC Intermediate School - Lennox
- Worthing Elementary School - Worthing

== Notable people ==
- Tommy Hofer, professional football player
