= Lake County Museum =

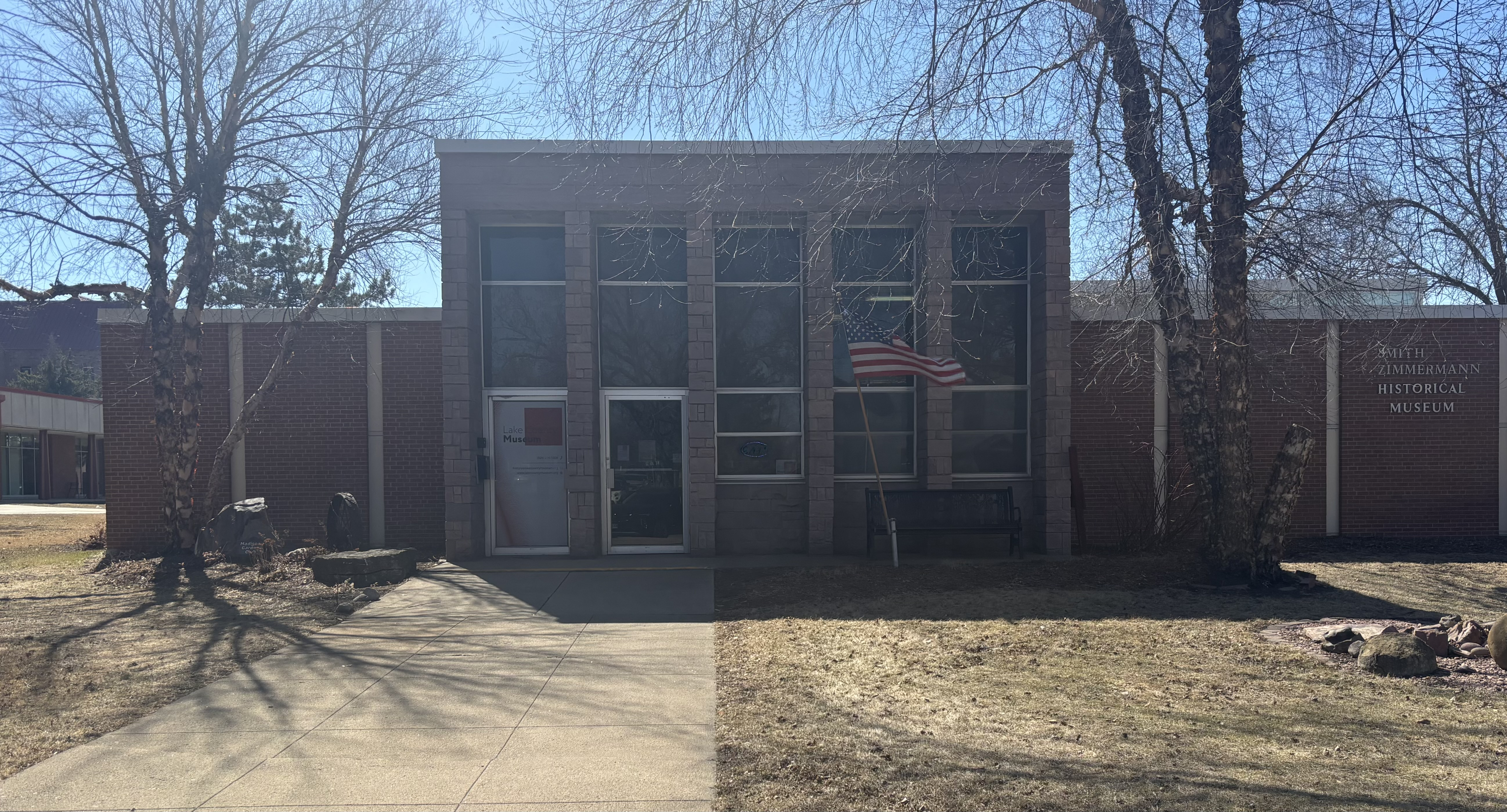
- Former name: Smith–Zimmermann Museum (1961–2021)
- Established: 1961
- Location: Madison, South Dakota, US
- Coordinates: 44.0133409°N 97.1121477°W
- Executive director: Julie Breu
- President: Danny Frisby–Griffin
- Website: www.lakecountymuseum.org

The Lake County Museum, opened in 1961, is located on the campus of Dakota State University in Madison, South Dakota, USA. Its main goal is to preserve the stories and artifacts of early pioneers in the region. It was established and is still ran by the Lake County Historical Society. In 1978, the museum came under the control of the Board of Cultural Preservation, but control was returned to the Lake County Historical Society in 1996. The museum was originally named the Smith–Zimmermann Museum, but was renamed to the Lake County Museum in 2021.

The museum is home to interactive and interpretive exhibits that offer a more educational and engaging experience for visitors.

Julie Breu is the current director. She is a graduate of Eastern Illinois University and has called Madison home for over 23 years.
