= Tom Bailey (baseball) =

Australian baseball player (born 1992)

Perth Heat – No. 15
- Pitcher
- Born: 15 August 1992 (age 34); Western Australia
- Bats: Right Throws: Right
- Stats at Baseball Reference

Thomas Bailey (born 15 August 1992) is an Australian professional baseball pitcher for the Perth Heat of the Australian Baseball League.

== Career ==
Bailey played college baseball at Dakota State University and Wayland Baptist University.

Bailey was selected as a member of the Australian national baseball team at the 2017 World Baseball Classic.
