= Pat Behrns =

American football player and coach (born 1950)

Biographical details
- Born: May 16, 1950 (age 76)

Playing career
- early 1970s: Dakota State

Coaching career (HC unless noted)
- 1972: Dakota State (DB)
- 1973–1974: New Mexico State (GA)
- 1975–1979: North Dakota (DB/RC)
- 1980–1985: North Dakota
- 1986–1991: Utah State (assistant)
- 1992–1993: UNLV (OC)
- 1994–2010: Nebraska–Omaha

Head coaching record
- Overall: 160–95
- Bowls: 0–1
- Tournaments: 1–8 (NCAA D-II playoffs)

Accomplishments and honors

Championships
- 7 NCC (1996, 1998, 2000, 2004–2007)

Patrick Charles Behrns (born May 16, 1950) is a former American college football coach. He served as the head coach at the University of Nebraska at Omaha from 1994 through the program being discontinued in March 2011, and was also the head coach of the University of North Dakota Fighting Sioux football team from 1980 to 1985. He is a 1972 graduate of Dakota State University.

== Head coaching record ==
Year	Team	Overall	Conference	Standing	Bowl/playoffs
North Dakota Fighting Sioux (North Central Conference) (1980–1985)
1980	North Dakota	6–4	5–2	T–2nd	
1981	North Dakota	6–4	4–3	T–2nd	
1982	North Dakota	7–3	5–2	2nd	
1983	North Dakota	6–5	4–5	T–4th	
1984	North Dakota	8–3	6–3	4th	
1985	North Dakota	3–8	2–7	T–8th	
North Dakota:		36–27	26–22		
Nebraska–Omaha Mavericks (North Central Conference) (1994–2007)
1994	Nebraska–Omaha	1–10	1–8	10th	
1995	Nebraska–Omaha	3–8	2–7	9th	
1996	Nebraska–Omaha	10–2	8–1	1st	L NCAA Division II First Round
1997	Nebraska–Omaha	8–3	6–3	4th	
1998	Nebraska–Omaha	9–3	8–1	T–1st	L NCAA Division II First Round
1999	Nebraska–Omaha	7–4	5–4	5th	
2000	Nebraska–Omaha	11–2	9–0	1st	L NCAA Division II Quarterfinal
2001	Nebraska–Omaha	8–3	6–2	T–2nd	L NCAA Division II First Round
2002	Nebraska–Omaha	6–5	5–3	3rd	
2003	Nebraska–Omaha	8–3	5–2	T–2nd	
2004	Nebraska–Omaha	8–3	5–1	1st	
2005	Nebraska–Omaha	8–3	4–2	T–1st	L NCAA Division II Second Round
2006	Nebraska–Omaha	8–3	7–1	T–1st	L NCAA Division II Second Round
2007	Nebraska–Omaha	10–1	8–0	1st	L NCAA Division II Second Round
Nebraska–Omaha Mavericks (Mid-America Intercollegiate Athletics Association) (2008–2010)
2008	Nebraska–Omaha	7–4	6–3	3rd	
2009	Nebraska–Omaha	7–5	6–3	T–2nd	L Kanza
2010	Nebraska–Omaha	5–6	5–4	5th	
Nebraska–Omaha:		124–68	95–46		
Total:		160–95			
National championship Conference title Conference division title or championship game berth
