= Dakota State Trojans football =

Football team for Dakota State University

2026 Dakota State Trojans football team
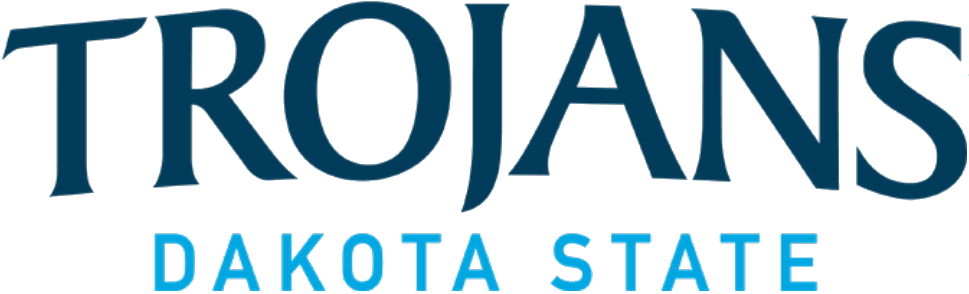
- First season: 1908; 118 years ago
- Athletic director: Bud Postma
- Head coach: Josh Anderson; 18th season, 79–106 (.427)
- Location: Madison, South Dakota
- Stadium: Brian Kern Family Stadium (capacity: 2,533)
- Field: Blankley Field
- Conference: Frontier Conference
- Colors: Trojan blue, DSU blue, and gray
- All-time record: 329–523–15 (.388)
- Bowl record: 1–0 (1.000)

Conference championships
- SDIC: 1973, 1975, 1976, 1977, 1978
- Consensus All-Americans: 41
- Rivalries: Dakota Wesleyan (Chamber of Commerce Traveling Cup); Black Hills State (Missouri River Shootout)
- Fight song: DSU Fight Song
- Website: dsuathletics.com/football

The Dakota State Trojans football team represents Dakota State University, competing as a member of the Frontier Conference in the National Association of Intercollegiate Athletics (NAIA). The school's first football team was fielded in 1908. The Trojans play their home games at Brian Kern Family Stadium. Their current head coach is Josh Anderson.

== History ==
=== Conference affiliations ===
- South Dakota Intercollegiate Conference (1917–2000)
- Dakota Athletic Conference (2000–2011)
- NAIA independent (2011–2013)
- North Star Athletic Association (2013–2025)
- Frontier Conference (2025–present)

== Conference championships ==
Dakota State has won 5 conference championships.

Year	Conference	Coach	Overall record	Conference record	Ref.
1973	South Dakota Intercollegiate Conference	Joel Swisher	6–3	5–0	
1975	South Dakota Intercollegiate Conference	Joel Swisher	6–3–1	4–1	
1976	South Dakota Intercollegiate Conference	Joel Swisher	8–2	4–1	
1977	South Dakota Intercollegiate Conference	Gary Buer	10–0	5–0	
1978	South Dakota Intercollegiate Conference	Gary Buer	8–2	6–0	

== Bowl games ==
Dakota State has played in one postseason bowl game. The Trojans have an all-time record of 1–0–0 in bowl games.

Year	Bowl game	Coach	Opponent	Result	Ref.
1971	Boot Hill Bowl	Lee Moran	Northwestern Oklahoma State	W 23–20	

== Coaches ==
=== Current coaching staff ===
Position	Name	Alma mater
Head coach / Tight ends	Josh Anderson	North Dakota State University
Offensive coordinator / Quarterbacks / Camp Coordinator	Logan Levy	University of Maryland, Baltimore County
Defensive coordinator / Defensive backs & safeties / Recruiting coordinator	Daidrick Kibbie	Dakota State University
Offensive line / Equipment coordinator	Deonte Randle	Dakota State University
Linebackers / Special teams / Academic coordinator	Tom Clarey	Northwestern College
Defensive line / Video coordinator	Zach Santolla	Emory & Henry University
Assistant coach	Clifton Marshall	
Graduate assistant / Director of football operations	Sadie Lindeman	
Graduate assistant / Assistant offensive line	Tyler Kjetland	
Graduate assistant / Wide receivers	Sam Holman	
Graduate assistant / Running backs	Lane VanderWal	
Graduate assistant / Specialists	Xander Sheehan	
Student assistant / Assistant defensive backs / Cornerbacks	Deveon Moses	
Student assistant	Aaron Brown	
Team manager	Courtney Stewart	

=== Head coaches ===
Number	Name	Tenure
1	Charles C. Wagner	1910–1923
2	George E. Thompson	1924–1927
3	J. Elbridge Curtis	1928–1930
4	Chuck Reynolds	1933–1941
5	Bill Bulfer	1946–1954
6	Neal Tremble	1955
7	Homer Englehorn	1956–1961
8	George Blankley	1962–1969
9	Lee Moran	1970–1972
10	Joel Swisher	1973–1976
11	Gary Buer	1977–1978
12	Bob Bozied	1979–1980
13	Tom Shea	1981–1983
14	Al Weisbecker	1984
15	Larry Traetow	1985–1988
16	Gary Roach	1989–1995
17	Scott Hoffman	1996–1999
18	Marc Bergan	2000–2001
19	Gene Wockenfuss	2002–2003
20	Nate Holtz	2004–2006
21	Tom Shea	2007–2008
22	Josh Anderson	2009–present

== Rivalries ==
=== Dakota Wesleyan ===
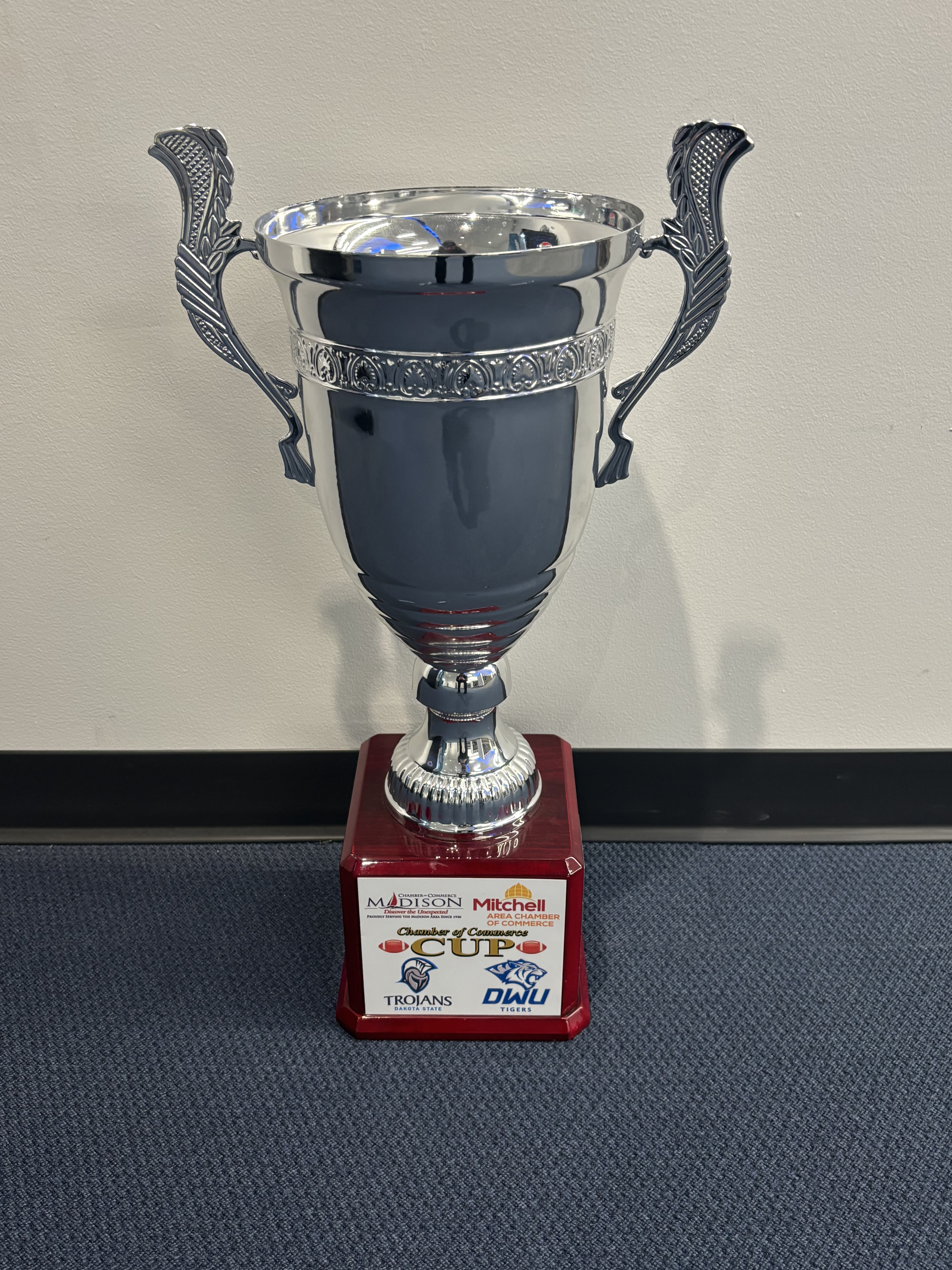
The Chamber of Commerce Traveling Cup

The Chamber of Commerce Traveling Cup is a traveling trophy awarded to the winner of the annual game between the Dakota State Trojans and the Dakota Wesleyan Tigers, who are members of the Great Plains Athletic Conference. The traveling trophy was introduced in 2017. Dakota State currently holds a series lead of 7–2.

=== Black Hills State ===
The Missouri River Shootout was a traveling trophy awarded to the winner of the annual game between the Dakota State Trojans and the Black Hills State Yellow Jackets. Black Hills State currently holds a series lead of 6–1.

== Stadiums ==
- unknown (1908–1967)
- Trojan Field (1968–2022)
- Dan Beacom Track Complex (2023)
- Brian Kern Family Stadium (2024–present)
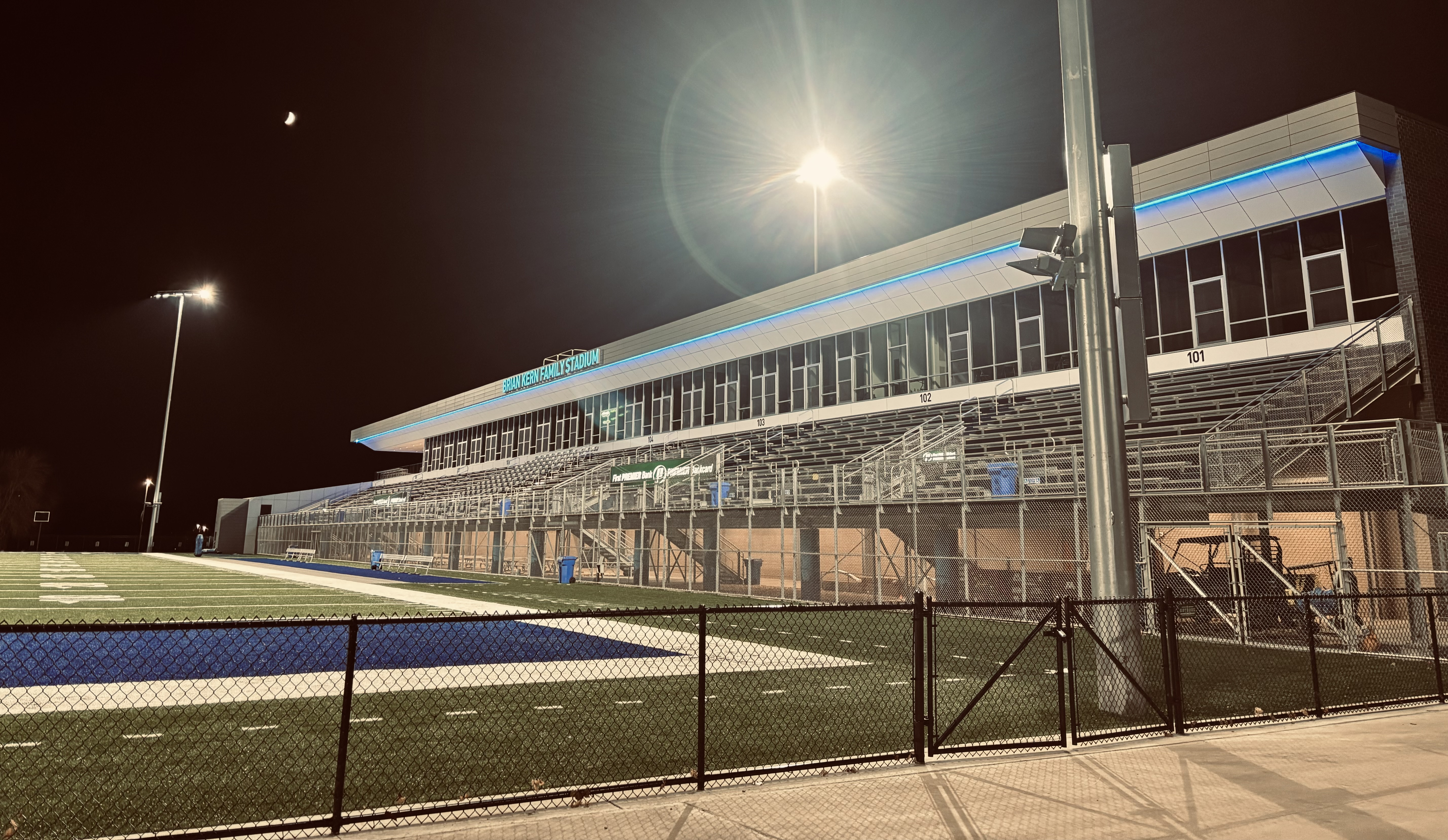
Brian Kern Family Stadium

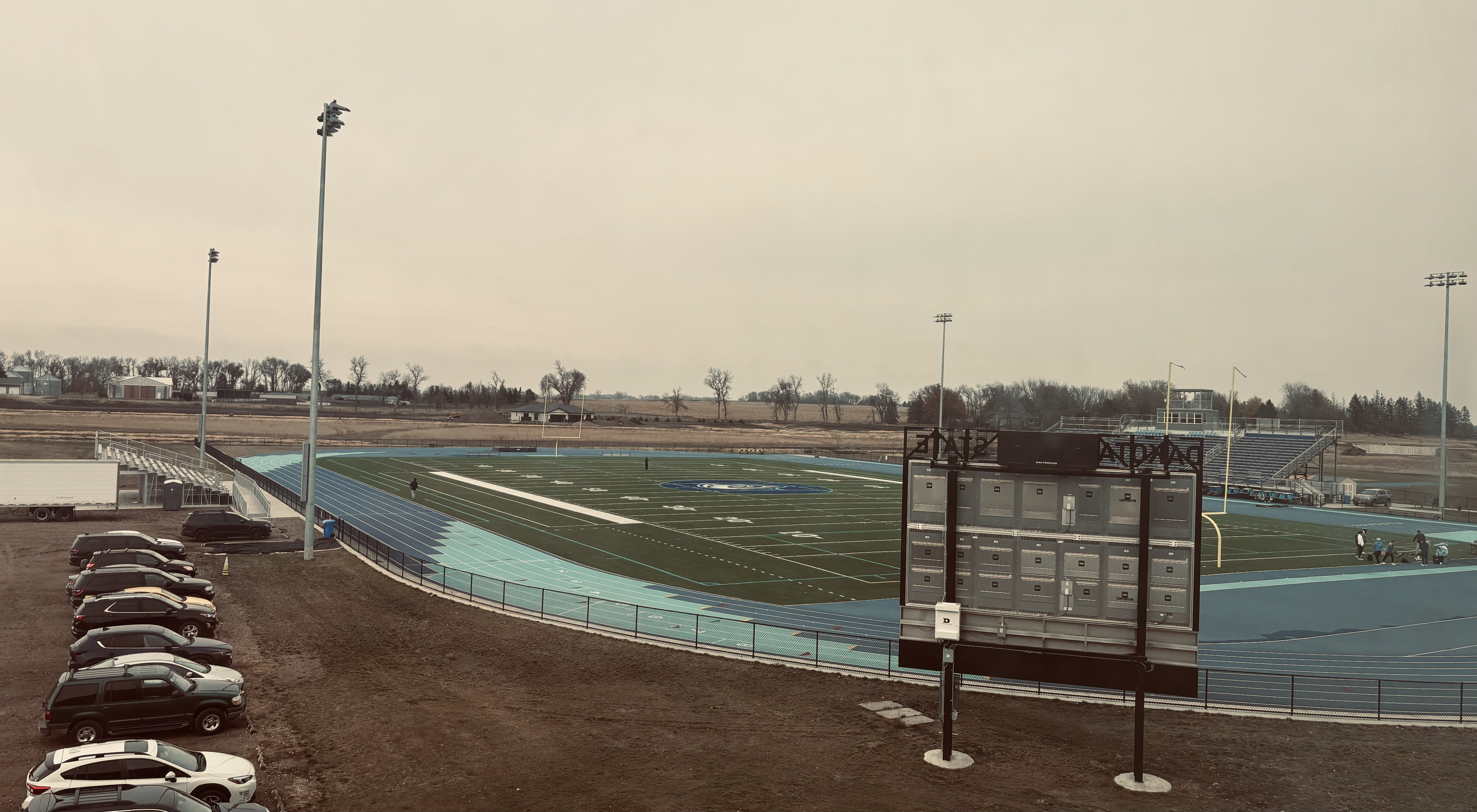
Dan Beacom Track Complex

Dakota State played its first game at Brian Kern Family Stadium on Blankley Field on August 29, 2024, defeating Dakota Wesleyan 34–3. The victory returned the Chamber of Commerce Traveling Cup to Dakota State. Carson Sauseda scored the stadium's first points with a 52-yard field goal. Tyce Ortman scored the first touchdown on a one-yard run and finished the game with three rushing touchdowns. A ribbon-cutting ceremony for the new stadium took place at halftime.

== Individual awards and honors ==
=== All-Americans ===
==== NAIA ====
Year	Player
1950	Robert Caselli
1970	Dan Stratton
1972	Darwin Robinson
1974	Toney Blacks
1976	Jeff Rodman
1977	Rick Rodman; Mike Freidel
1978	Jim Janssen; Todd Payer; Russ Schwartz
1980	Brian Leighton
1983	Clay Amick; Bruce Johannes
1984	Bill Nelson
1991	Mike Katen

Year	Player
1991	Jeff Rensch
1993	Tard Smith; Max Hodgen
1994	Max Hodgen
1995	Max Hodgen
1998	Steve Eide; Larry Voss
1999	Jared Peterreins
2000	Jeremy Javers; Jared Peterreins
2001	Mark Maples
2003	Tommy Hofer
2004	Tommy Hofer
2005	Tommy Hofer
2014	Zac Woods

Year	Player
2015	Ben Kullos
2016	Austin Opdahl
2017	Curt Boeke
2018	Brodie Frederiksen; Curt Boeke
2020	Noah Guse
2021	Caleb Nielsen; Noah Guse
2022	Cody Brown
2024	Deveon Moses
2025	Deveon Moses

=== SDIC honors ===
All-Conference

- "Ronnie" Best (1930)
- "Art" Johnson (1930)
- "Bud" O'Dell (1930)
- "Red" Olsbo (1930)
- "Buster" Seitz (1955)
- Larry Dirks (1958)
- Bob Nangle (1958)
- John Rath (1958)
- Arlo Sorheim (1959)
- Dick Anderson (1962–63)
- Denny Halseth (1963–64)
- Dick Greenwood (1965–66)
- Loren McKinney (1965–66)
- Tom Petersen (1965–66)
- Gene Elrod (1965–67)
- Paul Tanke (1965–67)
- Dan Meadows (1967)
- Leo Heilman (1969–70)
- Dennis Ziebarth (1969–70)
- Dave Hanneman (1970 and 1972)
- Pat Behrns (1971–72)
- Mike Reed (1971–72)
- Dan Stratton (1971–72)
- Cliff Anderson (1971–73)
- Randy Berlin (1972)
- Darwin Robinson (1972–73)
- Wayne Stowell (1972–73)
- Craig Ebert (1973)
- Deny Lather (1973)
- Mick Twiss (1973)
- Toney Blanks (1973–75)
- Bob Casagrande (1973–75)
- David Roe (1974)
- Jeff Rodman (1974–76)
- Kevin Stormo (1975)
- Bruce Breese (1975)
- Ron Estacion (1975)
- Rick Rodman (1977)
- Mike Freidel (1976–77)
- Russ Schwartz (1977–78)
- Joe Arthur (1978–79)
- Brian Leighton (1978–80)
- Todd Payer (1979)
- Lynn Schuett (1978–79)
- Jim Janssen (1978–79)
- Dale Martin (1979)
- Brian Jacobsen (1980–81)
- Mark Hughes (1982)
- Gene Wockenfuss (1982)
- Clay Amick (1982–83)
- Tim Ramey (1982–83)
- Eugene Tetzlaff (1982–83)
- Rod Kopfman (1982–84)
- Tony Wrice (1982–84)
- Mark Jacobsen (1983–84)
- Bruce Johannes (1983)
- Keith Stifter (1983–84)
- Bryan Lund (1984)
- Mike Thorpe (1984)
- Bill Nelson (1984)
- Sylvester Clark (1984)
- Paul Minor (1984)
- Brian Kern (1986–87)
- Tom Cummings (1989)
- Jeff Rensch (1989–91)
- Earl Berglund (1991–92)
- Dave Colberg (1991–92)
- Mike Katen (1991–92)
- Mike Mason (1991–92)
- Paul Naughton (1991–92)
- Don Simon (1991–93)
- Scott Millett (1991–93)
- Ben Button (1992 and 1994)
- Jason Smidt (1994)
- Tard Smith (1993–95)
- Max Hodgen (1992–95)
- Adam McVane (1994)
- Chad Ostrem (1994)
- Josh Anderson (1994–95)
- Chris Martin (1995)
- Larry Voss (1996–98)
- Derek Bush (1998)
- Steve Eide (1998)
- Jon Knutson (1998)
- Rich Nolte (1998)
- Troy Williamson (1998)
- Kyle Jellema (1998–99)
- Craig Jones (1998–99)
- Jared Peterreins (1998–99)
- Malcom Spaulding (1999)
- Justin Thielke (1999)
- Scot Namanny (1999)

=== DAC honors ===
All-Conference

- Jared Peterreins (2000)
- Craig Jones (2000)
- Justin Thielke (2000)
- Scot Namanny (2001)
- Jeremy Javers (2000–01)
- Brad Callahan (2001)
- Mark Maples (2001)
- Paul Lutu-Carroll (2001–02)
- Jesse Zwetzig (2001–02)
- BJ Podhradsky (2001–02)
- Tommy Hofer (2003–05)
- Ben Buisker (2003)
- Mike Sonne (2003–04)
- Tom Nielsen (2003)
- Blake Klinger (2004)
- Art Solis (2005)
- Nick Podhradsky (2005)
- Donald Strand (2005–08)
- Derek Barrios (2005)
- Derek Gosch (2005 and 2007)
- Gaven Davis (2007)
- Toby Ball (2007)
- Noah Sanderson (2007)
- Aaron Aylward (2008)
- Andrew Fatten (2008)
- Austen Hanten (2008)
- T.J. Simmons (2008)
- Ryan Poss (2009)
- Joe Whealy (2009–10)

=== NSAA honors ===
First-team All-NSAA

- Zach Ely (2013)
- Josh Licht (2013)
- Ronnie Jorgenson (2013)
- Zac Woods (2013–14)
- Perry King (2013)
- Cole Potter (2014–16)
- Ben Kullos (2014–15)
- Bobby Tisch (2015)
- Jason Grady (2015)
- Jacob Giles (2016–17)
- Robert Johnson (2016)
- Austin Opdahl (2016–17)
- Justin Pontarelli (2016–17)
- Greg Rodriguez (2016–17)
- Nic Behrens (2016)
- Curt Boeke (2017–18)
- Ryan Dozier (2017–18)
- Dereck DeVries (2017)
- Kaden Hight (2017)
- Brodie Frederiksen (2018–19)
- Brandon Schmit (2018–19)
- Mason Leighton (2018)
- Caleb Nielsen (2018–21)
- John Trout (2019)
- Marcus Vanden Bosch (2019–21)
- Noah Guse (2020–21)
- Devonte Murphy (2021 and 2023)
- Mose Timteo (2022)
- Cody Brown (2022)
- Jeremiah 'JJ' Beck (2022–23)
- Noah Karwacki (2022)
- Braxton Lacher (2023)
- Tyce Ortman (2024)
- Tyler Kjetland (2024)
- Caleb Dwyer (2024)
- Taron Serr (2024)
- Deveon Moses (2024)

Second-team All-NSAA

- Jeremy Christner (2014–15)
- Zach Ely (2014)
- Steven Gram (2014–15)
- Trevor Kenobbie (2014)
- Austin Ross (2014)
- Brendon Waldner (2014)
- Robert Johnson (2015)
- Austin Opdahl (2015)
- Greg Rodriguez (2015)
- Bronson Arguello (2015)
- DaVeon Banks (2015)
- Mitchell Galloway (2016)
- Andrew Adlersberg (2016)
- Thomas Romack (2016)
- Nic Behrens (2016)
- Brodie Frederiksen (2017 and 2019)
- John Trout (2017–18)
- Baily Edwards (2017)
- Danny Jordan (2017)
- Marcus Vanden Bosch (2018)
- Xavier Perez (2019)
- Riley Janke (2019)
- Noah Guse (2019)
- Conner Tordsen (2020–21)
- Braeden Wallenstein (2020)
- Jason Sakamoto (2020)
- Caleb Nielsen (2020)
- Mose Timteo (2021)
- Zach Rohrbach (2021)
- Gustavo Bonilla (2021)
- Jay Skogerboe (2021–22 and 2024)
- Tyce Ortman (2022–24)
- Devonte Murphy (2022)
- Max Sonne (2022)
- Noah Karwacki (2022)
- Tyler Kjetland (2023)
- Uziel Ruiz (2024)
- Melek Ford (2024)
- Austin Lake (2024)
- Collin Bruggeman (2024)
- Carson Sauseda (2024)

Honorable mention All-NSAA

- Austin Ross (2013)
- Bobby Tisch (2013)
- Ben Kullos (2013)
- Cole Whisenhunt (2013)
- Chad John (2013)
- Darion Office (2016)
- Curt Boeke (2016)
- Dereck DeVries (2016)
- Alvin Reels Jr. (2016)
- Brendon Waldner (2017)
- Michael Cleveland (2017–18)
- Brandon Schmit (2017)
- Brywn Ractliffe (2017)
- David Bond (2018)
- Mitchell Galloway (2018)
- Alexander Maxey (2018 and 2020–21)
- Wyatt Sanford (2019)
- Cole McCarty (2019–20)
- Karson Lindblad (2019)
- Braedon Wallenstein (2019)
- Riley Janke (2020)
- Jacob Hirsch (2020)
- Nico Feroni (2021)
- Jason Sakamoto (2021)
- Edward Fritzler (2021)
- Joshua Shaffer (2022)
- Gustavo Bonilla (2022)
- Travis Rebstock (2022)
- Cooper McDermott (2022)
- Tray Hettick (2023)
- Cole Sylliaasen (2023)
- Caleb Dwyer (2023–24)
- Marcis Hausman (2023)
- Chris Guipi-Bopala (2024)
- Brooks Jansen (2024)
- Kaden Eng (2024)
- Joseph Taylor (2024)

=== Frontier honors ===
First-team All-Frontier East Division

- Preston Iverson (2025)
- Uziel Ruiz (2025)
- Jordan Cooper (2025)
- Deveon Moses (2025)
- Tyler Kjetland (2025)
- Brandon Kjetland (2026)
- Tray Hettick (2026)
- Maddox Kihne (2026)
- Josiah Perez (2026)
- Tamareon Foster (2026)

Second-team All-Frontier East Division

- Tray Hettick (2025)
- Melek Ford (2025)
- Caleb Dwyer (2025)
- Brooks Jansen (2025)
- Taron Serr (2025)
- Trajan Davis (2026)
- Uziel Ruiz (2026)
- Jacob Imdieke (2026)
- Kaden Van Otterloo (2026)
- Michael Foster (2026)
- Maddox Kihne (2026) (Note: Kihne earned first-team honors as a wide receiver and second-team honors as a specialist)

Honorable mention All-Frontier East Division

- Maddox Kihne (2025)
- Kacey Cauley (2025)
- Adrian Villanueva (2025)
- Tamareon Foster (2025)
- Elliott Devries (2026)
- Joshua Shaffer (2026)
- Weston Leverson (2026)

Frontier East Division Player of the Year

- Tray Hettick (2026)

Frontier East Division Defensive Player of the Year

- Josiah Perez (2026)

== Professional players ==
=== NFL players ===
- Darwin Robinson – Washington Redskins, Seattle Seahawks
- Danny Stratton – Cleveland Browns

=== CFL players ===
- Tommy Hofer – Toronto Argonauts

=== Superserien players ===
- Oscar Kooistra – Stockholm Mean Machines
