= Lyle Hare Stadium =

Sports venue in Spearfish, SD, US

- Interactive map of Lyle Hare Stadium
- Location: Spearfish, South Dakota, United States
- Coordinates: 44.4985°N 103.8703°W
- Owner: Black Hills State University
- Capacity: 3,500

Construction
- Opened: 1950

Tenants
- Black Hills State Yellow Jackets football (1950–present); Black Hills State Yellow Jackets track and field

Lyle Hare Stadium is an outdoor athletic stadium located in Spearfish in the U.S. state of South Dakota. Opened in 1950, the stadium is home to the Black Hills State Yellow Jackets football and track teams of Black Hills State University. It also hosts the home football games of the Spartans of Spearfish High School.

A 2018 article from the National Collegiate Athletic Association (NCAA) described Lyle Hare Stadium as one of NCAA Division II's most scenic football stadiums, citing the mountain view from the stands.

== History ==
Lyle Hare Stadium officially opened in 1950. (Note: A 2016 Black Hills Pioneer article lists the opening year of the stadium as 1947, but the university itself recognizes 1950 as the official opening year.) The stadium is named after Lyle Hare, a former BHSU student-athlete, football coach, and physician.

In 1975, the stadium was renovated. Among the renovations were improvements to the concession areas, press box, new concrete stands with aluminum seating, new scoreboards, and a new all-weather running track. The renovations increased stadium seating capacity to 3,200. Previously, the stadium had 1,100 permanent seats. The first activity held in the newly-renovated stadium was a high school football game between Spearfish and Glendive.

In 2013, the field was renovated, with the grass replaced with artificial turf and a new electronic scoreboard installed. Installation for a new press box was also announced. In 2017, the turf was replaced due to failed soil stabilization underneath the prior turf.

In July 2016, plans were announced to expand the stadium to accommodate BHSU's new women's soccer program. While the South Dakota Board of Regents approved planning of the field expansion, the program announced later that month that the women's team would play at Ronnie Theisz Soccer Field.

== Track and field ==
Prior to the 1975 renovations, both Spearfish's high school and BHSU practiced on dirt and cinder tracks, with both unable to host track meets. In a 1981 article, Joe Case of the Queen City Mail described the track as "one of the finest facilities in the state." In 2005, a new track was installed.

The stadium has played host to the Rocky Mountain Athletic Conference track and field championships. In the leadup to the 2016 conference championship, the university installed a new cage for hammer throw and discus throw and repainted its track.

In 2021, due to the COVID-19 pandemic in South Dakota, the South Dakota High School Activities Association (SDHSAA) announced that Lyle Hare Stadium would be one of three host stadiums in the Black Hills area for the state high school track and field championships, the others being Woodle Field in Sturgis and O'Harra Stadium in Rapid City.
