= Lee Moran (American football) =

American football player and coach (born 1943)

Biographical details
- Born: 1943

Playing career
- 1961–1964: Morningside
- 1966: Omaha Mustangs
- Position: Guard

Coaching career (HC unless noted)
- 1968–1969: Dakota State (assistant)
- 1970–1972: Dakota State
- 1973–1974: New Mexico State (assistant)
- 1975: Kansas State (assistant)

Head coaching record
- Overall: 18–11
- Bowls: 1–0

Lee Moran (born 1943) is an American former football player and coach. He served as the head football coach at Dakota State University in Madison, South Dakota from 1970 to 1972, compiling a record of 18–11. After leaving Dakota State, Moran served as an assistant at New Mexico State University (1973 to 1974) and Kansas State University (1975).

== Head coaching record ==
Year	Team	Overall	Conference	Standing	Bowl/playoffs
Dakota State Trojans (South Dakota Intercollegiate Conference) (1970–1972)
1970	Dakota State	5–4	3–3	4th	
1971	Dakota State	9–2	4–2	2nd	W Boot Hill
1972	Dakota State	4–5	3–3	T–3rd	
Dakota State:		18–11	10–8		
Total:		18–11			
