= Charlie Flohr =

American football player and coach

Current position
- Title: Head coach
- Team: South Dakota Mines
- Conference: RMAC
- Record: 29–30

Biographical details
- Education: Northwest Missouri State

Playing career
- 1998–2001: Dakota State
- Position: Wide receiver

Coaching career (HC unless noted)
- 2002–2003: Northwest Missouri State (GA)
- 2004–2005: Truman (WR)
- 2006–2019: Northwest Missouri State (OC)
- 2020–present: South Dakota Mines

Head coaching record
- Overall: 29–30

Charlie Flohr is an American college football coach. He is the head football coach for the South Dakota School of Mines and Technology, a position he has held since 2020. He previously spent 14 years as an assistant coach at Northwest Missouri State.

== Head coaching record ==
Year	Team	Overall	Conference	Standing	Bowl/playoffs
South Dakota Mines Hardrockers (Rocky Mountain Athletic Conference) (2020–present)
2020–21	South Dakota Mines	2–2	0–0	N/A	
2021	South Dakota Mines	6–5	4–5	T–6th	
2022	South Dakota Mines	7–4	6–3	4th	
2023	South Dakota Mines	5–6	4–5	T–6th	
2024	South Dakota Mines	6–5	5–4	T–5th	
2025	South Dakota Mines	3–8	3–6	T–7th	
2026	South Dakota Mines	0–0	0–0		
South Dakota Mines:		29–30	22–23		
Total:		29–30			
