= Boot Hill Bowl =

Boot Hill Bowl (defunct)
- Stadium: Memorial Stadium (Dodge City)
- Location: Dodge City, Kansas
- Operated: 1970–1980
- Conference tie-ins: NAIA

The Boot Hill Bowl was a National Association of Intercollegiate Athletics post-season college football bowl game, played in Dodge City, Kansas from 1970 to 1980.

== Game results ==
| Date | Winner | | Loser | |
|---|---|---|---|---|
| December 1, 1970 | Cameron | 13 | New Mexico Highlands | 12 |
| December 4, 1971 | Dakota State | 23 | Northwestern Oklahoma State | 20 |
| December 2, 1972 | William Penn | 17 | Emporia State | 14 |
| December 1, 1973 | Millikin | 51 | Bethany | 7 |
| November 30, 1974 | Washburn | 21 | Millikin | 7 |
| November 22, 1975 | Buena Vista | 24 | Saint Mary of the Plains | 21 |
| November 20, 1976 | Benedictine | 29 | Washburn | 14 |
| November 19, 1977 | Missouri Western | 35 | Benedictine | 30 |
| November 18, 1978 | Chadron State | 30 | Baker | 19 |
| November 17, 1979 | Pittsburg State | 43 | Peru State | 14 |
| November 21, 1980 | Cameron | 34 | Adams State | 16 |

== Historical highlights ==
=== 1971 game ===
On December 4, 1971, the Dakota State College football Trojans helped make history as they were the first college football team from South Dakota to win a post-season bowl game. The Boot Hill Bowl Champion Trojans posted a record of nine wins and two losses that season and were ranked as high as number seven in the national rankings. In just his second season with the Trojans, Head Coach Lee Moran was named NAIA Football Coach of the Year.

=== 1973 game ===
The 1973 game between William Penn University and Emporia State University will be remembered for the weather change during game time. The temperatures at kickoff were hovering around 70 °F, by game's end the outside air temperatures had plummeted to the lower 40 °F to upper 30 °F. The players and fans were caught completely off guard at the drastic drop in temperatures.

=== 1974 game ===
The 1974 game between Washburn University and Millikin University is remembered most not for its game but for its temperature and playing conditions. The temperature was recorded at 10 °F (−12 °C) with a north wind of gusts of up to 40 miles per hour (64 km/h). A few Washburn players spread an analgesic ointment cream on their bodies, attempting to provide an extra layer of protection from the cold—reportedly, this did not work.

== See also ==
- List of college bowl games
