= Black Hills State Yellow Jackets =

Black Hills State University athletic teams

- University: Black Hills State University
- Conference: RMAC (primary); NIRA (rodeo)
- NCAA: Division II
- Athletic director: Mark Nore
- Location: Spearfish, South Dakota
- Varsity teams: 14 (4 men's, 8 women's, 2 co-ed)
- Football stadium: Lyle Hare Stadium
- Basketball arena: Donald E. Young Center
- Mascot: Sting
- Nickname: Yellow Jackets
- Colors: Green and gold
- Website: bhsuathletics.com
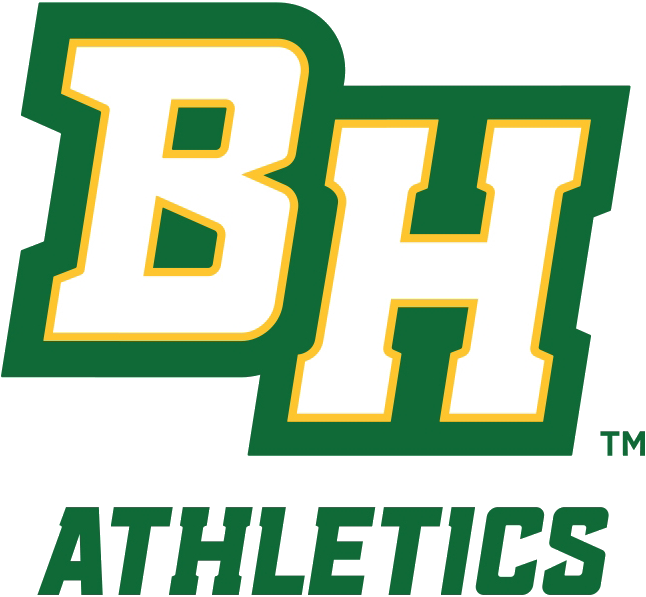

The Black Hills State Yellow Jackets are the athletic sports teams for Black Hills State University. They are currently a member of the NCAA Division II and participate in the Rocky Mountain Athletic Conference (RMAC). BHSU Rodeo teams are members of the National Intercollegiate Rodeo Association (NIRA).

== Varsity sports ==
Men's sports

- Basketball
- Cross Country
- Football
- Rodeo
- Track and Field

Women's sports

- Basketball
- Cross Country
- Golf
- Rodeo
- Soccer
- Softball
- Track and Field
- Triathlon
- Volleyball

=== Rivalry ===
Black Hills State's main athletic rival is the South Dakota School of Mines and Technology Hardrockers. The rivalry is generated from proximity, with SDSM&T located less than 50 miles to the east in Rapid City. Educational differences between the schools also help fuel the rivalry, with BHSU being mainly a liberal arts college and SDSM&T an engineering research university. The football rivalry is the second most-frequently played series in the US, behind Harvard-Yale. It is also the oldest football series west of the Mississippi River. The last game of each season is reserved for the two schools to play, however the two schools may play twice in the same season. In the later game, they battle for the Homestake Trophy, named for a mine in the Black Hills area. This game is called the Black Hills Brawl, due to the ferocity in which the teams play each other.

=== Softball ===
The Yellow Jackets softball team appeared in the first Women's College World Series in 1969.

== Transition to NCAA ==
In July 2010 the university received word it had been accepted into NCAA Division II. The move to the NCAA was a multiple-year process that included a two-year candidacy period followed by a one-year provisional season, in which BHSU was not allowed to advance into NCAA postseason play. The Rocky Mountain Athletic Conference (RMAC) extended an invitation for Black Hills State University to be considered for membership. Following the successful transition, the university became a full member of the NCAA DII in 2013.

== Notable alumni ==
- Zac Alcorn – Former NFL tight end
- Brian Shaw — Strongman, four-time winner of the World's Strongest Man (2011, 2013, 2015, and 2016) competition
