= Dakota Athletic Conference =

- Association: NAIA
- Founded: 2000
- Folded: 2012
- Sports fielded: 15; men's: 8; women's: 7
- No. of teams: 4 (final); 10 (all-time)
- Headquarters: Dickinson, North Dakota
- Region: The Dakotas; Region III of the NAIA
- Website: dakotaac.org

Locations
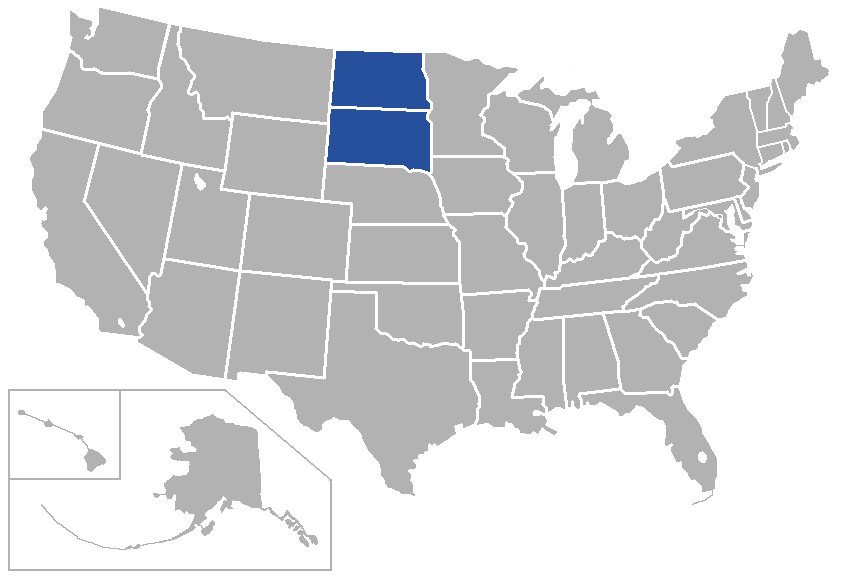

The Dakota Athletic Conference (DAC) was a college athletic conference affiliated with the National Association of Intercollegiate Athletics (NAIA). As the name implies, member teams were located in the states of North Dakota and South Dakota. The conference folded after the 2011–12 academic year.

== History ==
The Dakota Athletic Conference was formed from a merger between the North Dakota College Athletic Conference (NDCAC) and the South Dakota Intercollegiate Conference (SDIC), effective the 2000-01 academic year. Ten schools were a part of the conference in its history, consisting of the following:

- Formerly from the NDCAC: Dickinson State University, Jamestown College, the University of Mary, Mayville State University, Minot State University and Valley City State University
- Formerly from the SDIC: Black Hills State University, Dakota State University, Si Tanka University-Huron and South Dakota School of Mines and Technology

The DAC was one of the only NAIA conferences to have a television contract; America One owned the broadcast rights to the conference, although most of the games were only carried through the network's subscription service, B2 Networks.

=== Chronological timeline ===
- 2000 – The Dakota Athletic Conference (DAC) was founded due to a merger of the North Dakota College Athletic Conference (NDCAC) and the South Dakota Intercollegiate Conference (SDIC). Charter members included Dickinson State University, Jamestown College, the University of Mary, Mayville State University, Minot State University and Valley City State University from the NDCAC, and Black Hills State University, Dakota State University, Si Tanka University–Huron and South Dakota School of Mines and Technology from the SDIC, beginning the 2000–01 academic year.
- 2005 – Si Tanka–Huron left the DAC after the school was declared to cease operations after the 2004–05 academic year.
- 2006 – Mary left the DAC to join the Division II ranks of the National Collegiate Athletic Association (NCAA) as a member of the Northern Sun Intercollegiate Conference (NSIC) after the 2005–06 academic year.
- 2011 – On July 1, 2011 Dakota State announced they were leaving the DAC to become an NAIA Independent. Additionally, member schools Black Hills State, Minot State and South Dakota Mines also left the DAC while in the process of transitioning to NCAA Division II as NCAA D-II Independents: (Black Hills State would later join the Rocky Mountain Athletic Conference (RMAC) and Minot State would later join the NSIC during the 2012–13 academic year, while South Dakota Mines would later the RMAC during the 2014–15 academic year), all effective after the 2010–11 academic year.
- 2012 – The DAC would cease operations as an athletic conference at the end of the 2011–12 academic year; as many schools left to join their respective new home primary conferences: Dickinson State left for the Frontier Conference while Jamestown, Mayville State and Valley City State became NAIA independent schools (though they would eventually join the North Star Athletic Association (NSAA); Jamestown, Mayville State and Valley City State as part of the charter members during the 2013–14 school year, alongside former DAC conference member and NAIA Independent Dakota State; and Dickinson State followed suit during the 2014–15 school year coming from the Frontier).

== Member schools ==
=== Final members ===
The DAC ended with four full members, only one was a private school:

Institution	Location	Founded	Affiliation	Enrollment	Nickname	Joined (Note: Represents the calendar year when fall sports competition begins.)	Left (Note: Represents the calendar year when spring sports competition ends.)	Subsequent conference(s)	Current conference
Dickinson State University	Dickinson, North Dakota	1916	Public (Note: Part of the North Dakota University System.)	2,572	Blue Hawks	2000	2012	North Star (NSAA) (2014–2025)	Frontier (2012–14, 2025–Present)
Jamestown College	Jamestown, North Dakota	1883	Presbyterian (PCUSA)	900	Jimmies	2000	2012	NAIA Independent (2012–13); Great Plains (GPAC) (2018–24); North Star (NSAA) (2013–18, 2024–2025)	Northern Sun (NSIC) (2025–Present)
Mayville State University	Mayville, North Dakota	1889	Public	780	Comets	2000	2012	NAIA Independent (2012–13); North Star (NSAA) (2013–2025)	Frontier (2025–Present)
Valley City State University	Valley City, North Dakota	1890	Public	1,220	Vikings	2000	2012	NAIA Independent (2012–13), North Star (NSAA) (2013–2025)	Frontier (2025–Present)

=== Former members ===
The DAC had six former full members, only two were private schools:

Institution	Location	Founded	Affiliation	Enrollment	Nickname	Joined (Note: Represents the calendar year when fall sports competition begins.)	Left (Note: Represents the calendar year when spring sports competition ends.)	Subsequent conference	Current conference
Black Hills State University	Spearfish, South Dakota	1881	Public (Note: Part of the South Dakota Board of Regents System.)	4,739	Yellow; Jackets	2000	2011	D-II Independent (2011–12)	Rocky Mountain (RMAC) (Note: Currently an NCAA Division II athletic conference.) (2012–present)
Dakota State University	Madison, South Dakota	1881	Public	2,282	Trojans	2000	2011	NAIA Independent (2011–13); North Star (NSAA) (2013–2025)	Frontier (2025–present)
Minot State University	Minot, North Dakota	1913	Public (Note: Part of the North Dakota University System.)	3,851	Beavers	2000	2011	D-II Independent (2011–12)	Northern Sun (NSIC) (2012–present)
Si Tanka University at Huron	Huron, South Dakota	1883	Nonsectarian	N/A	Screaming; Eagles	2000	2005	Closed in 2005	
South Dakota School of Mines and Technology	Rapid City, South Dakota	1885	Public	2,345	Hardrockers	2000	2011	D-II Independent (2011–14)	Rocky Mountain (RMAC) (2014–present)
University of Mary	Bismarck, North Dakota	1959	Catholic (Benedictines)	2,758	Marauders	2000	2006	Northern Sun (NSIC) (2006–present)	

== Sports ==
Member schools fielded men's and women's teams in cross country, basketball, track and field and golf. Men's-only sports were baseball, football and wrestling, while soccer, softball and volleyball were only offered for women.
