= Dakota State University =

University in Madison, South Dakota, US

- Former name: List: Madison Normal School or Dakota State Normal (1881–1902); Madison State Normal School (1902–1921); Eastern State Normal School (1921–1927); Eastern State Teachers College (1927–1947); General Beadle State Teachers College (1947–1964); General Beadle State College (1964–1969); Dakota State College (1969–1989)
- Motto: Embrace Innovation
- Type: Public university
- Established: March 5, 1881; 145 years ago
- Academic affiliations: Space-grant
- Endowment: $16.2 million (2020)
- Chancellor: José-Marie Griffiths
- President: John R. Ballard
- Students: 3,975
- Undergraduates: 3,108
- Postgraduates: 867
- Location: Madison, South Dakota, U.S. 44.01229°N 97.11285°W
- Campus: 78 acres (32 ha)
- Colors: Trojan blue, DSU blue and gray
- Nickname: Trojans
- Sporting affiliations: NAIA – Frontier
- Website: dsu.edu

Dakota State University (DSU) is a public university in Madison, South Dakota, United States. The school was founded in 1881 as a normal school, or teacher training school. Education is still the university's heritage mission, but a signature mission of technology was added by the state legislature in 1984 to specialize in "programs in computer management, computer information systems, and other related undergraduate and graduate programs".

== History ==
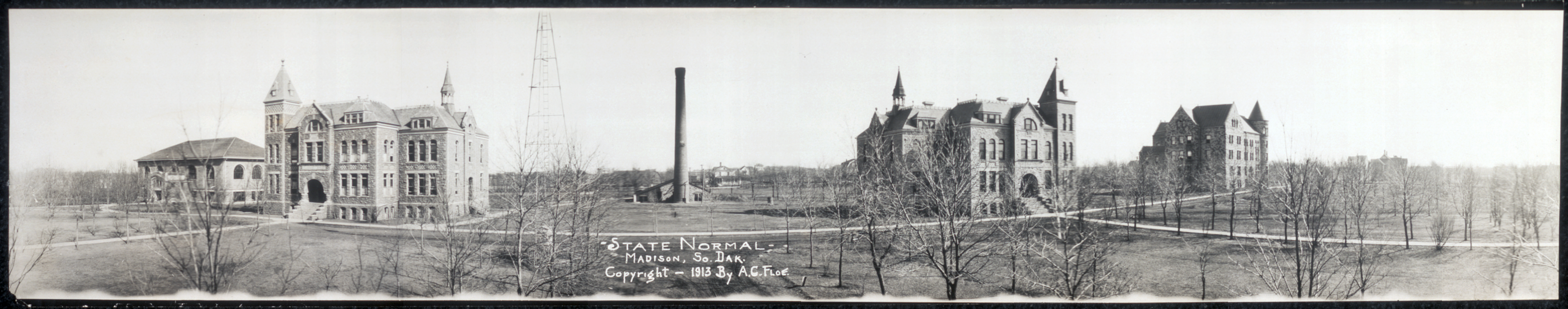
Madison State Normal School in 1913

Dakota State University was founded in 1881, eight years before South Dakota became a state. It has been through several name changes:

- 1881—Madison Normal School or Dakota State Normal, and was the first school dedicated to training teachers in the Dakota Territory.
- 1902—Madison State Normal School
- 1921—Eastern State Normal School was officially adopted: changed to Eastern State Teachers College in 1927.
- 1947—General Beadle State Teachers College, after the school's third president William Henry Harrison Beadle (1889–1905); amended to General Beadle State College in 1964.
- 1969—Dakota State College
- 1989—Dakota State University, to reflect the addition of graduate programs.

The university's homecoming celebration has also undergone several name changes, first Pioneer Day (1922), then Eastern Frontier Day in 1923 (changed because another state's normal schools were using Pioneer Day), Eastern Day (1924–1954), Tutor Day (1955-1970's), and now Trojan Days.

José-Marie Griffiths is the school's 23rd president and will transition to a newly created Chancellor role to advocate for the university's cyber programs at the end of the 2025–2026 academic year. In March 2026, the South Dakota Board of Regents announced that Dr. John R. Ballard assumed office as the university's 24th president in June 2026.

DSU is also home to the Lake County Museum, formerly known as the Smith-Zimmermann Museum and the Karl E. Mundt Library and archives.

== Academics ==
Dakota State is a National Center of Academic Excellence in Information Assurance Education, designated in 2004 by the National Security Agency. DSU now holds four such distinctions, with awards from the Department of Homeland Security/National Security Agency (NSA) as a National Center of Academic Excellence in Information Assurance Education, Information Assurance Research, and Cyber Operations. It is also a Cyber Defense Regional Resource Center.

The 2026, U.S. News & World Report listed the university as tied for #20 in Top Public Schools (Regional Universities Midwest), and tied for #61 overall in Regional Universities Midwest; the four year graduation rate is 37%.

=== Accreditation and governance ===
Dakota State is governed by the South Dakota Board of Regents and is accredited by the Higher Learning Commission (HLC). Programs in the College of Education are accredited by the CAEP. The Health Information Management programs are accredited by the Commission on Accreditation for Health Informatics and Information Management and in 2016 the program was named an Approved Education Partner (AEP) by the Healthcare Information and Management Systems Society (HIMSS). The undergraduate and business programs are accredited by Accreditation Council for Business Schools and Programs.

=== Beadle Scholar ===
An institutional repository (IR) was launched in August 2018 and named "Beadle Scholar" after former university president William Henry Harrison Beadle who served from 1889 to 1905. Beadle Scholar houses research and major projects by faculty and students including theses, posters, and works of art. Information housed on Beadle Scholar is generally accessible to all.

=== CyberCorps Scholarship ===
Dakota State University offers the nation's largest National Science Foundation CyberCorps: Scholarship for service program. The scholarship covers 100% of tuition and fees and additional funding for professional projects. Students who receive this scholarship will also be given $34,000 in stipends each year. Recipients also receive paid summer internships and guaranteed cyber employment in the government. This scholarship can be renewed for up to three years and each year requires the student to commit to a government job after graduation.

=== MadLabs ===
In October 2019, Dakota State University opened the Madison Cyber Labs (commonly referred to as MadLabs), an $18 million, 38,500-square-foot facility dedicated to cybersecurity research and economic development.The building serves as a multidisciplinary hub, housing over a dozen specialized, faculty-led laboratories that focus on areas such as digital forensics, vulnerability identification, and the security of Internet of Things (IoT) devices. MadLabs facilitates partnerships between students, faculty, government agencies, and private industry by providing both open collaborative environments and secure, classified research spaces.

== Student life ==
Undergraduate demographics as of Fall 2023
Race and ethnicity	Total
White	76%
Hispanic	5%
Two or more races	4%
Black	4%
International student	3%
Unknown	3%
American Indian/Alaska Native	2%
Asian	2%
Economic diversity
Low-income (Note: The percentage of students who received an income-based federal Pell grant intended for low-income students.)	25%
Affluent (Note: The percentage of students who are a part of the American middle class at the bare minimum.)	75%

Enrollment has grown from two graduates in its first class in 1885, to 3,190 students enrolled in the fall of 2016. Of those, 2,844 are undergraduates and 346 are postgraduate students. On-campus students number 2,754; 1,134 are Internet-only students. Students come from 49 states and 59 countries.

The average student/faculty ratio is 17/1. For undergraduates, the average class size is 15.3 students; for graduate students, on-campus class size is 4.1. More than $18 million in financial aid was awarded in 2015.

Students may choose from over 45 campus clubs and campus and national organizations. The school also has a comprehensive student services program, including career services, international programs, Student Success Center (counseling, academic probation, wellness, tutoring), diversity and inclusion and Title III services. The student body at Dakota State University is represented by the DSU Student Senate, which serves as the primary liaison between students, university administration, and the South Dakota Board of Regents.

=== Cyber competitions ===
DSU has a cybersecurity team which regularly competes against other collegiate teams in multiple competitions, one of which is the National Collegiate Cyber Defense Competition. DSU's defensive cybersecurity team was among the finalists in the years 2009, 2014, 2016, 2019, 2023, and 2024. In 2018 and 2025, the team won third place. In 2013 and 2022, the team won second place. In 2026, the team won first. In the 2017 Argonne National Laboratory Cyber Defense Competition where fifteen collegiate teams from around the country competed, DSU placed in second as well, in tie with Kansas State University.

Dakota State University also fields an offensive cybersecurity team who, in the 2024-2025 Collegiate Penetration Testing Competition season, placed first out of twelve collegiate teams from around the world.

== Campus ==
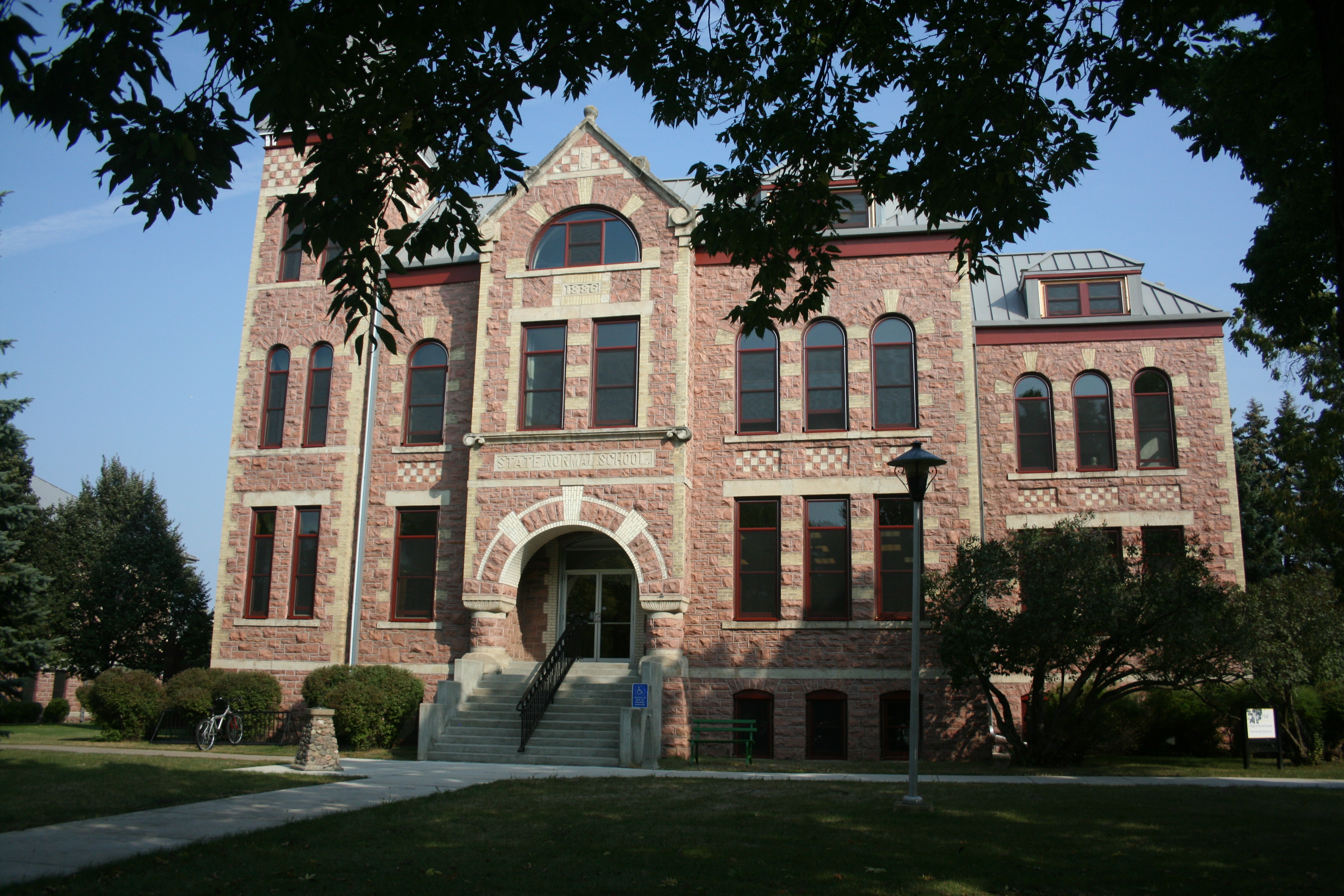
Beadle Hall

The historic portion of the 78-acre campus includes five buildings facing an open lawn area called the "Campus Green". The oldest building on campus is Beadle Hall, built in 1886 and currently under renovation. The newest building is the Beacom Institute of Technology.

There is a newly built cyber research and development facility and organization called the Madison Cyber Labs or MadLabs. Renovations to the school's athletic facilities are now complete.

=== Residence halls ===
Student housing consists of ten different buildings ranging from dorms to suites. These include: Higbie Hall, Emry Hall, Zimmermann Hall, Richardson Hall, The Courtyard, Residence Village, 8-Plexes, Girton House, Van Eps Place, and the 2-1-2 House.

=== Karl Mundt Library ===
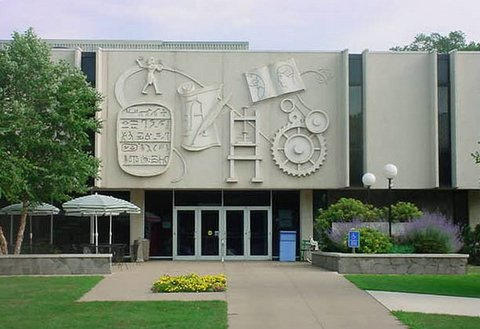
Karl Mundt Library

Campus is home to Karl Mundt Library which was built in 1968 and named after former South Dakota Republican Senator Karl Mundt. The library's dedication was attended by Richard Nixon, 37th President of the United States, who gave a speech in front of approximately 10,000 people.

== Athletics ==
The Dakota State athletic teams are called the Trojans. The university is a member of the National Association of Intercollegiate Athletics (NAIA), primarily competing in the Frontier Conference, which they joined during the 2025–26 academic year. Previously, they were members of the North Star Athletic Association (NSAA) as a founding member, which started during the 2013–14 academic year. The Trojans previously competed as an NAIA Independent within the Association of Independent Institutions (AII) from 2011–12 to 2012–13; and in these defunct conferences: the Dakota Athletic Conference (DAC) from 2000–01 to 2010–11; and the South Dakota Intercollegiate Conference (SDIC) from 1917–18 to 1999–2000.

Dakota State competes in 12 intercollegiate varsity sports: Men's sports include baseball, basketball, cross country, football, and track & field (indoor and outdoor); while women's sports include basketball, soccer, cross country, softball, track and field (indoor and outdoor) and volleyball; and co-ed sports include eSports.

=== Brian Kern Family Stadium ===
In August 2024, Dakota State University opened the Brian Kern Family Stadium, a facility with a seating capacity of 2,533. The stadium hosted its inaugural game on August 29, 2024, where the Trojans beat the Dakota Wesleyan Tigers by a score of 34–3. In addition to university athletics, the stadium also serves as a venue for the local Madison High School football games. The opening of the stadium was part of the Beacom PREMIER Complex development, aimed at enhancing athletic facilities on campus.

=== Accomplishments ===
Dakota State University teams have won 56 conference championships and produced 80 All-Americans (14 women, 66 men). Also, 112 DSU athletes have been named NAIA All-Scholar athletes. There have been 856 Trojans who have received the distinction of being cited an All-Conference athlete (230 football, 135 track, 75 baseball, 70 cross country, 66 softball, 60 volleyball, 50 women's basketball and 44 men's basketball).

== Campus media ==
KDSU is a college campus radio station which broadcasts in the student union and online at kdsu.net. The Sigma Tau Delta honor society releases a yearly zine-like publication, New Tricks, of student and faculty work that includes poetry and art. The Trojan Times is the student newspaper.

== Notable alumni ==
- Richard Barrett Lowe (1929) — writer, director, and politician
- Robert Caselli (1951) — politician
- Shantel Krebs (1998) — politician
- Pat Behrns (1972) — college football coach
- Darwin Robinson (1974) — professional football player
- Aaron Aylward (2009) — politician
- Josh Conklin (2003) — college football coach
- Charlie Flohr (2002) — college football coach
- Tommy Hofer (2005) — professional football player
- Anthony Drealan (2011) — college track and field coach
- Gene Wockenfuss (1983) — college athletic director and football coach
- Madhu Gottumukkala (2023) — civil servant
- Stephanie Sauder (1990) – politician
- Steve Kueter (1977) – high school football coach
- Tom Pischke (2004) – politician
- David Gassman (1971) – politician and college baseball player
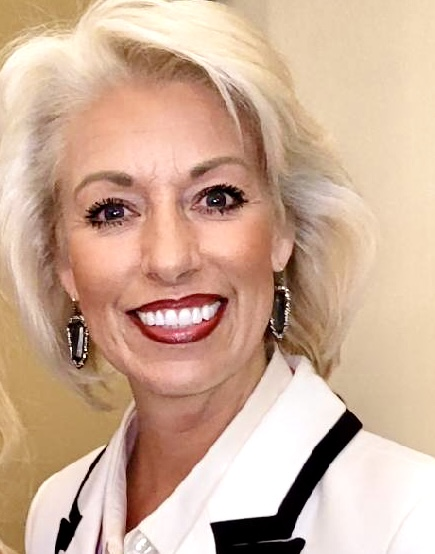
Shantel Krebs

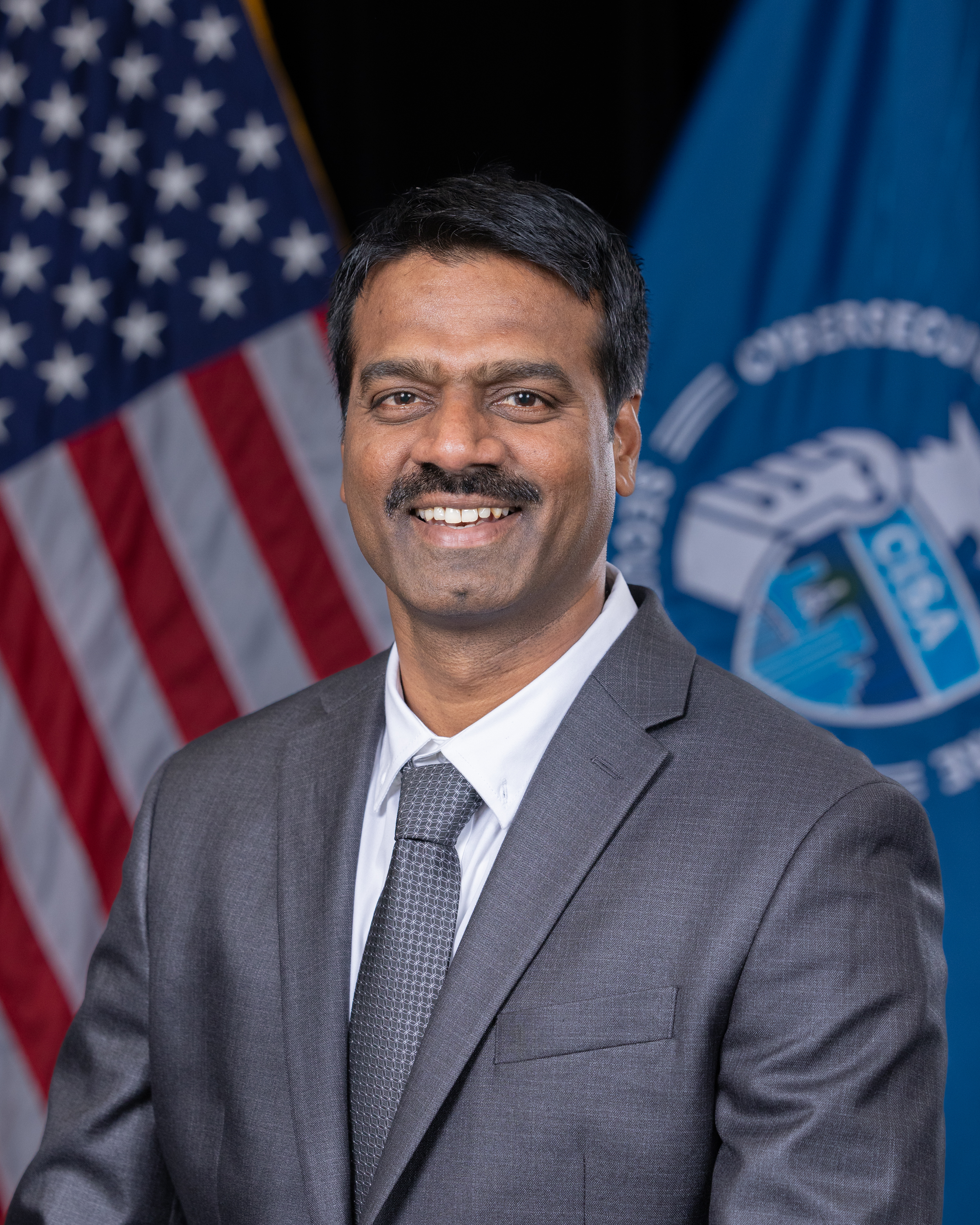
Madhu Gottumukkala

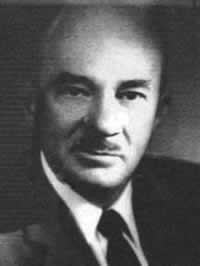
Richard Barrett Lowe

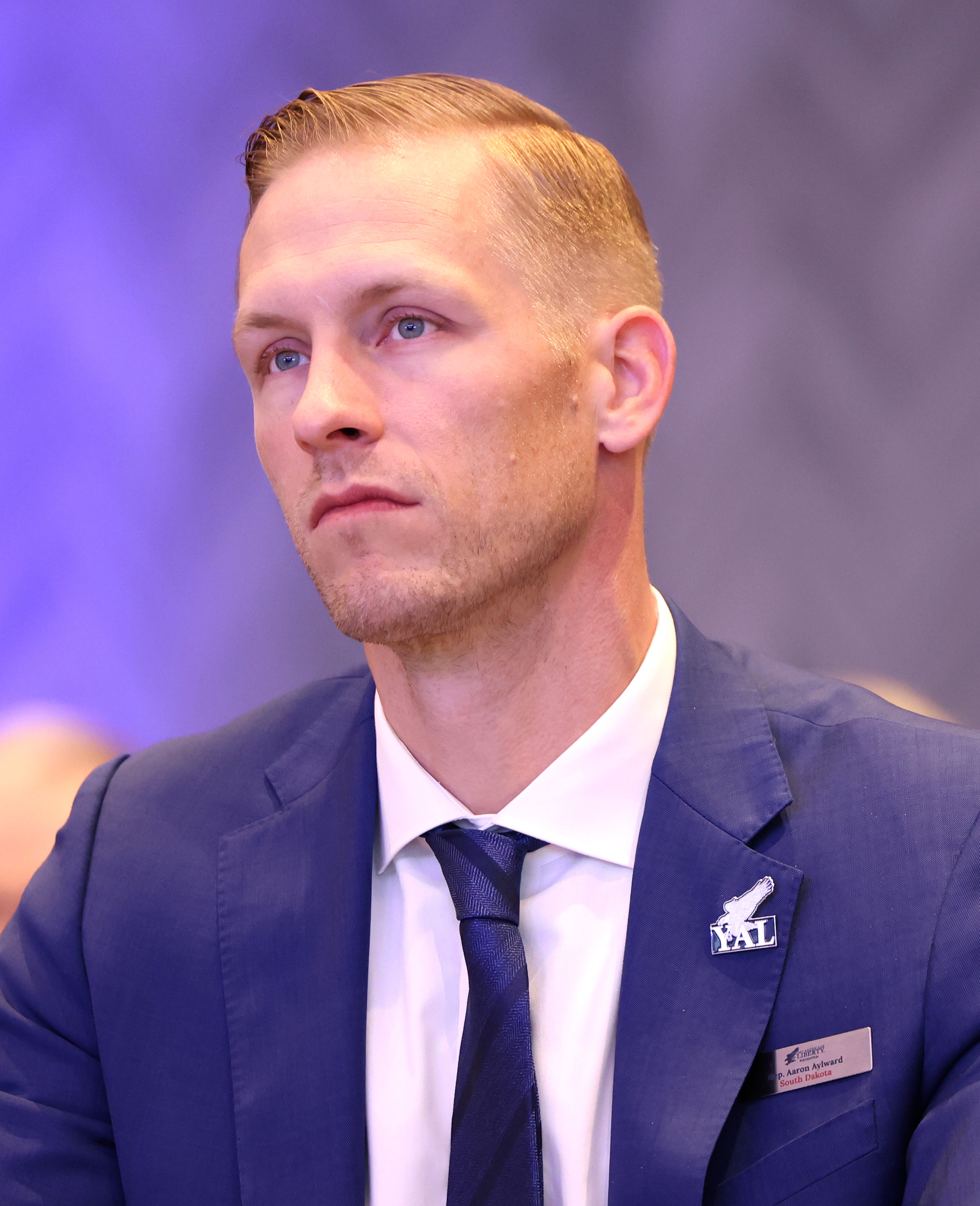
Aaron Aylward

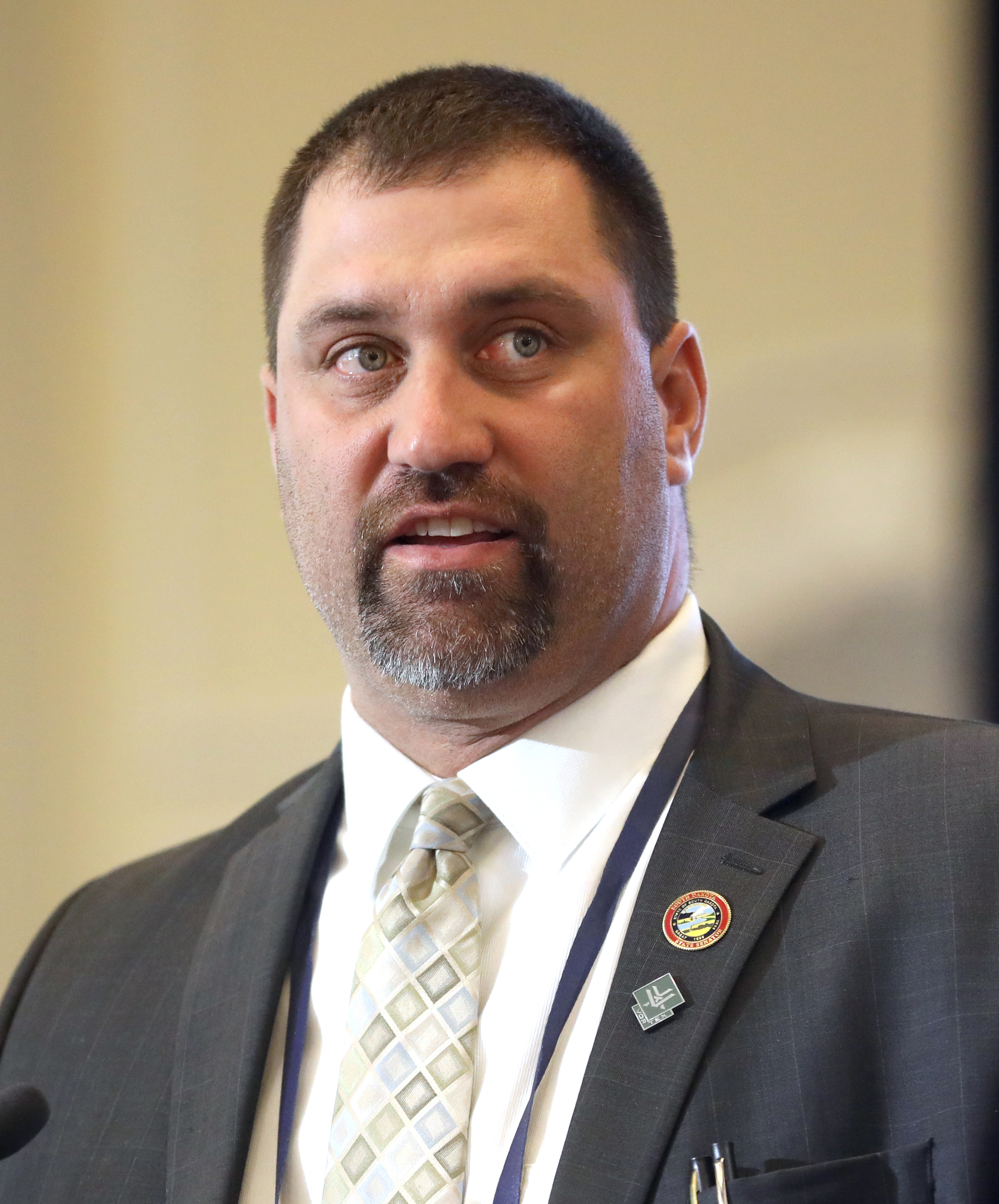
Tom Pischke
