= South Dakota Intercollegiate Conference =

College athletic conference

The South Dakota Intercollegiate Conference (SDIC) was an NAIA-associated collegiate athletic conference that ceased operations following the 1999–2000 academic school year when it merged with the North Dakota College Athletic Conference to form the Dakota Athletic Conference. The SDIAC was formed in 1917 from twelve schools, though membership was down to five during World War II, as the religious schools formed the South Dakota College Conference (later Dakota–Iowa Conference). Those schools joined back in by 1948. From 1995 to 2000 seasons, the league was known as the South Dakota–Iowa Intercollegiate Conference, thanks to the addition of Dordt and Westmar colleges in Iowa. Westmar closed in 1997. The SDIIC dissolved in 2000, with half of the schools heading to the DAC (Black Hills State, Dakota State, Si-Tanka Huron, and South Dakota Mines), while the other half joined the Great Plains Athletic Conference (Dakota Wesleyan, Dordt, Mount Marty, and Sioux Falls).

The following is a list of historic members:

Institution	Nickname	Location	First year	Last year	Current conference
Augustana College	Vikings	Sioux Falls, South Dakota	1917; 1948	1940*; 1949	Northern Sun Intercollegiate Conference
Black Hills State University	Yellow Jackets	Spearfish, South Dakota	1917	2000	Rocky Mountain Athletic Conference
Columbus College	Mariners	Chamberlain and Sioux Falls, South Dakota	1917	1929	Closed 1929
Dakota State University	Trojans	Madison, South Dakota	1917	2000	Frontier Conference
Dakota Wesleyan University	Tigers	Mitchell, South Dakota	1917; 1948	1940*; 2000	Great Plains Athletic Conference
Northern State University	Wolves	Aberdeen, South Dakota	1917	1974	Northern Sun Intercollegiate Conference
Redfield College	Royals	Redfield, South Dakota	1917	1932	Closed 1932
University of Sioux Falls	Cougars	Sioux Falls, South Dakota	1917; 1948; 1977	1940*; 1960*; 2000	Northern Sun Intercollegiate Conference
Si Tanka-Huron University	Eagles	Huron, South Dakota	1917; 1948	1940*; 2000	Closed in 2005
South Dakota School of Mines and Technology	Hardrockers	Rapid City, South Dakota	1917	2000	Rocky Mountain Athletic Conference
University of South Dakota–Springfield	Pointers	Springfield, South Dakota	1917	1984	Closed in 1984
Yankton College	Greyhounds	Yankton, South Dakota	1917; 1948; 1981	1940*; 1960*; 1984	Closed in 1984
Dordt College	Defenders	Sioux Center, Iowa	1995	2000	Great Plains Athletic Conference
Mount Marty College	Lancers	Yankton, South Dakota	1995	2000	Great Plains Athletic Conference
Westmar University	Eagles	Le Mars, Iowa	1995	1997	Closed in 1997

(*) Augustana, Dakota Wesleyan, Huron, Sioux Falls, and Yankton played in the SDCC/SDIC from 1940 to 1948. Sioux Falls and Yankton also left in 1960 to play in the Tri-State Conference. Sioux Falls returned in 1977 and Yankton returned in 1981.

== Membership timeline ==
(*) Institution closed at this time
