= 1951 South Dakota Mines Hardrockers football team =

American college football season

1951 South Dakota Mines Hardrockers football

SDIC champion
- Conference: South Dakota Intercollegiate Conference
- Record: 8–0 (6–0 SDIC)
- Head coach: Marvin Lewellyn (5th season)
- Captains: Doug Blackwell; Ralph Teslow
- Home stadium: O'Harra Stadium

1951 South Dakota Intercollegiate Conference football standings
	Conf.					Overall
Team	W		L		T	W		L		T
South Dakota Mines $	6	–	0	–	0	8	–	0	–	0
Southern State (SD)	6	–	1	–	0	6	–	1	–	1
Black Hills	3	–	1	–	0	6	–	2	–	0
Northern State	3	–	2	–	0	4	–	4	–	0
Huron	3	–	3	–	0	5	–	3	–	0
Yankton	3	–	3	–	0	3	–	4	–	0
General Beadle	1	–	4	–	0	1	–	5	–	0
Sioux Falls	0	–	5	–	0	0	–	7	–	0
Dakota Wesleyan	0	–	6	–	0	0	–	6	–	0
$ – Conference champion

The 1951 South Dakota Mines Hardrockers football team was an American football team that represented the South Dakota School of Mines and Technology as a member of the South Dakota Intercollegiate Conference (SDIC) during the 1951 college football season. Led by Marvin Lewellyn in his fifth and final season as head coach, the Hardrockers compiled a perfect overall record of 8–0 with a mark of 6–0 in conference play, winning the SDIC title. They held opponents to seven or fewer points in seven games, including four shutouts, and outscored all opponents by a total of 158 to 34. Right halfback Doug Blackwell and center Ralph Teslow were selected as the team's co-captains. The team played its home games at O'Harra Stadium in Rapid City, South Dakota.

The 1951 team was inducted as a group in 2006 into the South Dakota Mines Athletic Hall of Fame.

== Schedule ==
Date	Time	Opponent	Site	Result	Attendance	Source
September 21		at Huron	Huron, SD	W 19–0		
September 28		Dakota Wesleyan	O'Harra Stadium; Rapid City, SD	W 32–6		
October 5		Southern State	O'Harra Stadium; Rapid City, SD	W 22–7		
October 12	8:00 p.m.	Valley City State*	O'Harra Stadium; Rapid City, SD	W 19–14		
October 20	1:00 p.m.	at General Beadle	Madison, SD	W 14–0		
October 26	8:00 p.m.	Sioux Falls	O'Harra Stadium; Rapid City, SD	W 26–0		
November 3	2:30 p.m.	at Dickinson State*	Dickinson, ND	W 6–0		
November 12	2:00 p.m.	Black Hills	O'Harra Stadium; Rapid City, SD (rivalry)	W 20–7	4,000	
*Non-conference game; All times are in Mountain time
