= 1938 South Dakota Mines Hardrockers football team =

American college football season

1938 South Dakota Mines Hardrockers football

SDIC champion
- Conference: South Dakota Intercollegiate Conference
- Record: 8–0 (5–0 SDIC)
- Head coach: Lem Herting (5th season)
- Home stadium: O'Harra Stadium

1938 South Dakota Intercollegiate Conference football standings
| | Conf. | | | | | Overall |
| Team | W | | L | | T | W | | L | | T |
|---|---|---|---|---|---|---|---|---|---|---|
| South Dakota Mines $ | 5 | – | 0 | – | 0 | 8 | – | 0 | – | 0 |
| Dakota Wesleyan | 4 | – | 1 | – | 0 | 5 | – | 3 | – | 0 |
| Yankton | 4 | – | 2 | – | 0 | 5 | – | 3 | – | 0 |
| Southern Normal | 3 | – | 2 | – | 0 | 4 | – | 2 | – | 0 |
| Augustana (SD) | 2 | – | 2 | – | 1 | 5 | – | 2 | – | 1 |
| Huron | 3 | – | 3 | – | 0 | 5 | – | 3 | – | 0 |
| Northern Normal | 2 | – | 3 | – | 1 | 2 | – | 4 | – | 2 |
| Sioux Falls | 1 | – | 4 | – | 0 | 1 | – | 7 | – | 0 |
| Eastern Normal | 0 | – | 3 | – | 0 | 1 | – | 6 | – | 0 |
| Spearfish | 0 | – | 4 | – | 0 | 3 | – | 4 | – | 0 |
$ – Conference champion; Yankton initially won the conference title with a 5–1 mark, but later forfeited and their win over South Dakota Mines and the title because of an ineligible player.

The 1938 South Dakota Mines Hardrockers football team was an American football team that represented the South Dakota School of Mines (now known as the South Dakota School of Mines and Technology) as a member of the South Dakota Intercollegiate Conference (SDIC) in the 1938 college football season. Led by Lem Herting in his fifth season as head coach, the team compiled an overall record of 8–0, with a mark of 5–0 in conference play, and finished as SDIC champion.

== Schedule ==
| Date | Opponent | Site | Result | Attendance | Source |
|---|---|---|---|---|---|
| September 16 | South Dakota State* | O'Harra Stadium; Rapid City, SD | W 18–7 | 4,000 | |
| September 23 | Dickinson State* | O'Harra Stadium; Rapid City, SD | W 35–0 | | |
| September 30 | Eastern Normal | O'Harra Stadium; Rapid City, SD | W 66–0 | | |
| October 8 | at Northern Normal | Aberdeen, SD | W 20–0 | | |
| October 14 | Southern Normal | O'Harra Stadium; Rapid City, SD | W 39–6 | | |
| October 21 | Chadron State* | O'Harra Stadium; Rapid City, SD | W 14–7 | | |
| November 4 | Yankton | O'Harra Stadium; Rapid City, SD | W 0–19 (forfeit win) | | |
| November 11 | at Spearfish | Spearfish, SD | W 20–0 | | |
*Non-conference game
