= IKV =

IKV may refer to:

- Ankeny Regional Airport, IATA code IKV
- IKV-3 Kotka, glider
- Illya Kuryaki and the Valderramas, musical group
- Indre Kystvakt, branch of the Norwegian Coast Guard
- Institut für Kunststoffverarbeitung, the Institute for Plastics Processing at the RWTH Aachen
- IKV 91
