= WCAT =

WCAT may refer to:

== Radio stations ==
- WCAT-FM, a radio station at 102.3 FM located in Carlisle, Pennsylvania
- WWKL (FM), which was previously known as WCAT-FM and was simulcast on the current WCAT-FM
- WQVD, a radio station (700 AM) licensed to Orange-Athol, Massachusetts, United States, which used the call sign WCAT from 1956 to 1987 and from 1988 until 2005
- WKMY (FM), a radio station (99.9 FM) licensed to Athol, Massachusetts, United States, which used the call sign WCAT-FM from 1989 until 2002
- WXXL, a radio station (106.7 FM) licensed to Tavares, Florida, United States, which used the call sign WCAT-FM from 1987 until 1988
- WCAT (South Dakota), a defunct radio station at 1230 AM, deleted in 1952, formerly located in Rapid City, South Dakota
- WCAT (Vermont), a defunct radio station at 1390 AM, deleted in 2022, formerly located in Burlington, Vermont

== Other uses ==
- Wakefield City Academies Trust
