= Dan Lennon =

American football and track coach (1908–2002)

Biographical details
- Born: January 5, 1908; Vermillion, South Dakota, U.S.
- Died: October 4, 2002 (aged 94); Mesa, Arizona, U.S.

Playing career

Football
- 1931–1934: South Dakota

Coaching career (HC unless noted)

Football
- 1946: South Dakota Mines
- 1947: South Dakota (assistant)

Track
- 1949–1975: South Dakota

Head coaching record
- Overall: 2–6 (football)

Daniel H. Lennon (January 5, 1908 – October 4, 2002) was an American football and track and field coach. He served as the head football coach at the South Dakota School of Mines in 1946. Lennon was the head track coach at his alma mater, the University of South Dakota, from 1949 to 1975.

== Head coaching record ==
=== Football ===
Year	Team	Overall	Conference	Standing	Bowl/playoffs
South Dakota Mines Hardrockers (South Dakota Intercollegiate Conference) (1946)
1946	South Dakota Mines	2–6	1–2	4th	
South Dakota Mines:		2–6	1–2		
Total:		2–6			
