= Fulweiler =

Fulweiler is a surname. Notable people with the surname include:

- Howard Fulweiler, American football player and coach and clergyman
- Joyce Fulweiler, American politician
- Wally Fulweiler, American marine biogeochemist

== See also ==
- Weiler
