= Setralit =

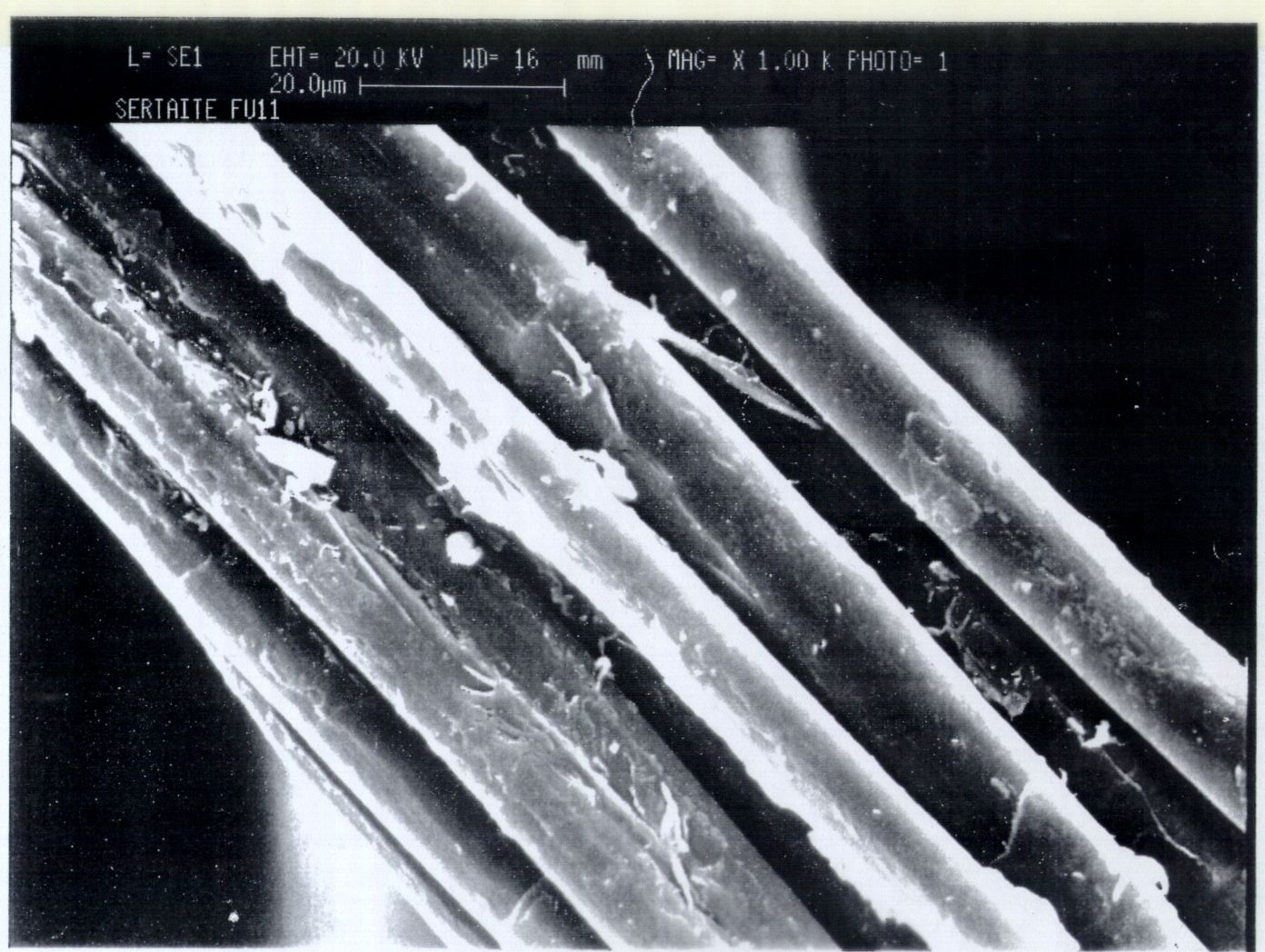
Setralit: worldwide first SEM micrograph of ultrasonically opened flax fibers

Setralit is a technical natural fiber based on plant fibers whose property profile has been modified selectively in order to meet different industrial requirements. It was first manufactured in 1989 by Jean-Léon Spehner, an Alsatian engineer, and further developed by the German company ECCO Gleittechnik GmbH. The name “Setralit“ is derived from the French company Setral S.à.r.l. which is a subsidiary company of ECCO, where Spehner was employed at that time. Setralit was officially described first in 1990.

== History ==
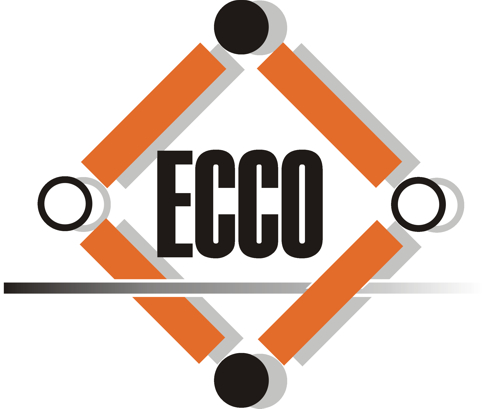
ECCO-Logo

In the late eighties and early nineties asbestos in friction pads was banned at first in Germany and subsequently in the European Union (EU). Consequently, the friction lining industry was looking for a substitute that was suitable as a reinforcing as well as a processing fiber. At the same time the EU established and subsidized a mandatory property set-aside to restrict the grain production. Only plants für use in industry could be grown on the set-aside land without affecting subsidies. Both the EU and the Federal Republic of Germany supplied money to boost the development of new materials and new manufacturing processes of such “renewable resources”, first of all for bast fiber plants like flax and – since 1996 – hemp with low THC content.

Against this background ECCO took part in joint project for the utilization of flax fibers in brake and clutch linings, funded by the German Federal Department for Research and Technology (BMFT). During this project several Setralit fiber types were being used for the first time. They had been generated by a chemical, thermal and/or mechanical treatment of flax tow which is a side product of the textile industry. The German popular press praised this approach as a ”sensational invention“.

However, the varying properties of the base material of first generation Setralit turned out to be a serious disadvantage because these variations affected the performance characteristics of the final product in an unforeseeable way. These differences are mainly being caused by growth and harvest conditions and as such are being influenced by the climate as well as by short-term weather fluctuations in the growing area. These effects are particularly critical during dew retting.

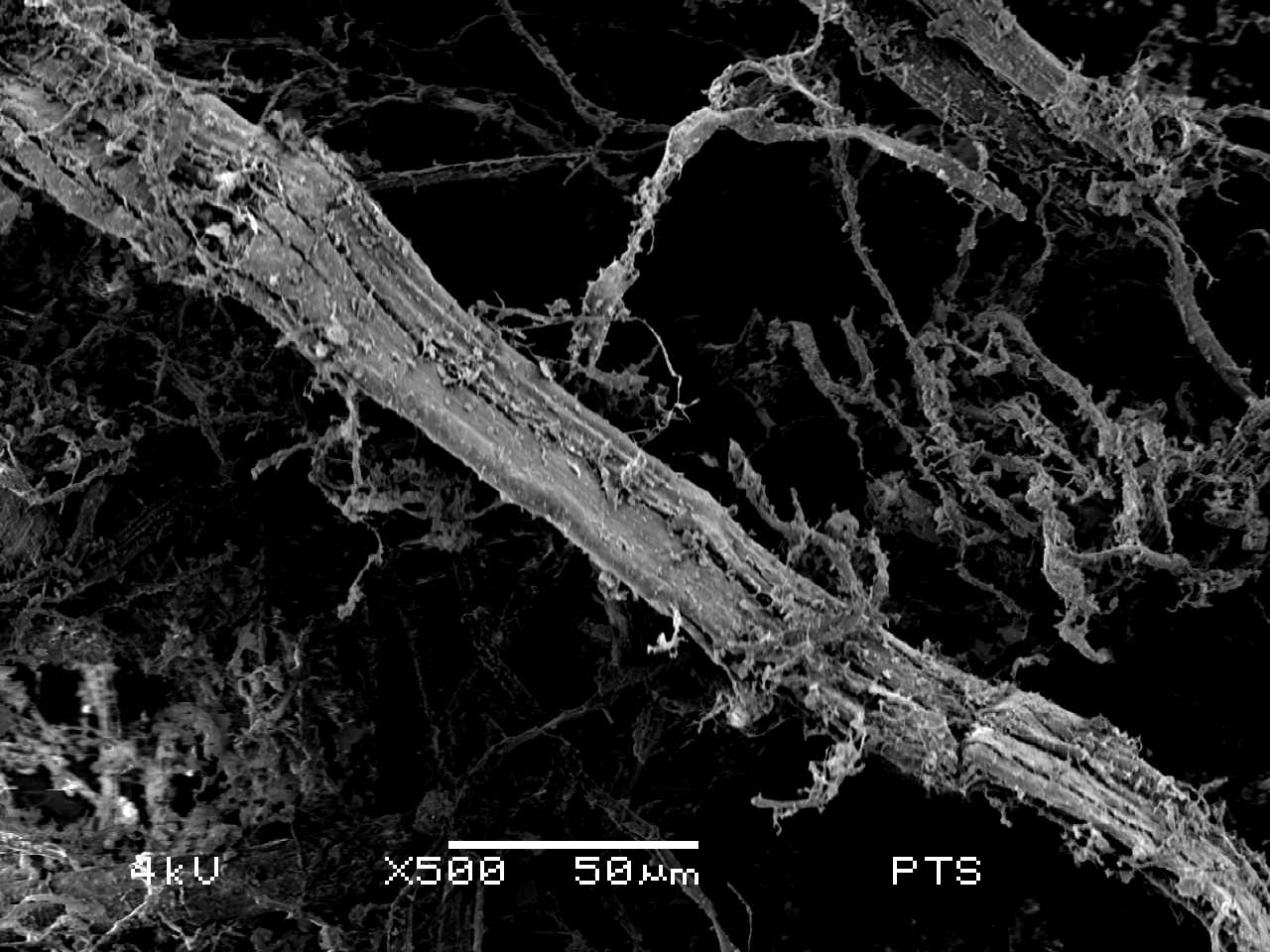
fibrillated Setralit fiber

In order to avoid this problem ECCO developed an ultrasonic decomposition process (named “ultrasonic break-down“) at the end of the 90's. Thanks to this controllable, physico-chemical extraction most of the associated material of the plant fibers (lignin, pectin, waxes, natural adhesives, fragrances and dyestuffs, as well as dust, bacteria, and fungi spores) is removed or destroyed. These second generation Setralit-fibers show an immensely smaller range of property variations compared to those of the first generation, which makes them more attractive for industrial use.

Following this, ECCO developed a series of Setralit types for various industrial end applications in cooperation with several industry partners in the construction, plastic and paper industries. In 2005, a fibrillated Setralit fiber managed to achieve the industrial breakthrough. This type is mainly used as a substitute for aramid pulp (Kevlar, Twaron et al.) for example in friction pads.

The omnipresent political discussions about sustainability, protection of the natural resources, and reduction of global warming gases push the Setralit fiber into the focus of new industrial users.

According to the Nova Institute, Hürth, Germany, in the future there is no alternative to the increased substantial use of agricultural raw materials. Bio-based substances such as biodegradable and durable bio plastics, natural fiber reinforced (bio) plastics (bio composites) and wood-plastic composites (WPC) form an interesting new class of materials thereby.

== Production (Setralit process) ==
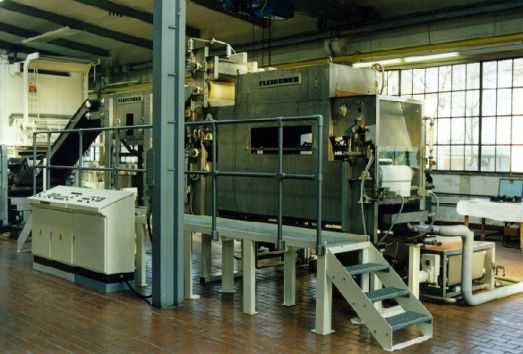
Ultrasonic technical plant

Setralit production is two-staged. During the first step the raw material is being subjected to an aqueous ultrasonic procedure followed by washing and drying. During the second step of conditioning the so-cleaned Setralit-fiber is specifically treated depending on its end use. In general this step is merely mechanical (cutting, grinding, fibrillating etc.), but it can also be combined with a thermal or chemical treatment. The term Setralit process means the combination of two (or more) manufacturing steps in a row. Decomposition of the plant fiber bundles leaves the basic physical properties of the elementary fibers unaffected; therefore Setralit is still identified as a natural fiber.

The chemical fiber extraction by ultrasound is controllable, as are the following conditioning processes. Thus the properties can be fitted to the requirements of the end products – within the range that nature of fiber allows.

In principle, any plant fibers can be considered as raw material. However, bast fibers of annuals (flax, hemp, jute, kenaf et al.) are preferred. Appropriate are stem fibers of perennial plants (nettle, ramie), leaf fibers (sisal, abaca, cabuja, curaua) plus seed and fruit fibers (cotton, kapok, coir). In contrast, the application of the Setralit technique to herbage (bamboo, miscanthus, bagasse, cereal, rice and corn straw) and wood has only been explored rudimentarily.

The Setralit techniques are applied either on crushed dry straw of bast fiber plants (mechanical fiber extraction) or on decorticated fibers (long fibers, flax tow). In the first case the fiber has to be separated mechanically, after the ultrasonic break-down, from its non-fibrous components (shives). As a benefit one gets clean shives as a byproduct which can serve as a raw material for high quality fiber powder. With the help of modified Setralit techniques the shives may also be upgraded separately.

== Characteristics ==
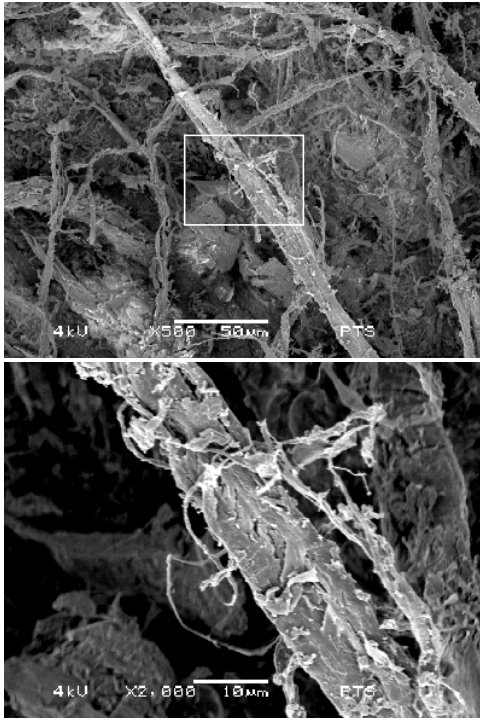
Setralit type 1: Natural fiber, ultrasonically treated, highly fibrillated (hemp)

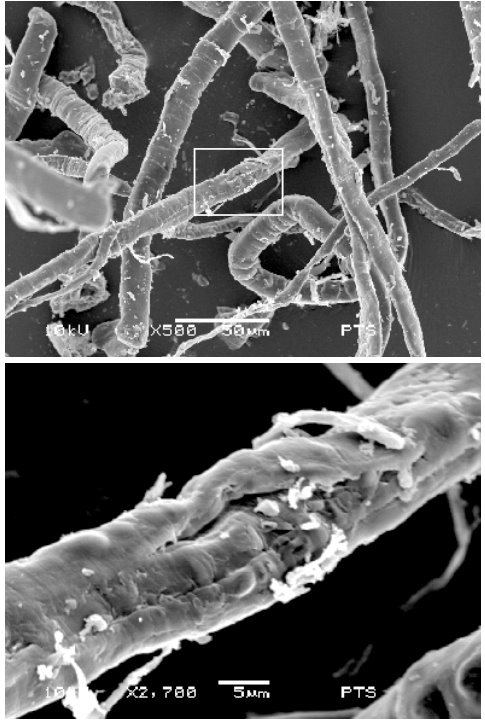
Setralit type 2: Natural fiber, ultrasonically treated, slightly fibrillated (flax)

Concerning the technical characteristics, Setralit fibers differ remarkably from the raw fibers from which they were extracted from. The distinctive attribute of Setralit compared to a conventionally gained fiber is the reproducibility of its technical properties. These are being produced by standardized treatment processes. As conventional natural fibers mainly reflect the quality variations of the primary material, these are being evened out by ultrasonic extraction.

Other differing characteristics are:

- High cleanliness
- Brighter color
- Higher temperature resistance
- Customized and constant quality
- Rapid, high, and equal water absorption.

The different, mostly mechanical conditioning actions of step two lead to a range of well defined Setralit-types that differ in appearance as well as in technical characteristics. These properties are suited for the possible application of a certain Setralit-type. They are stated in the technical datasheet. The specification describes the permitted variation of such parameters.

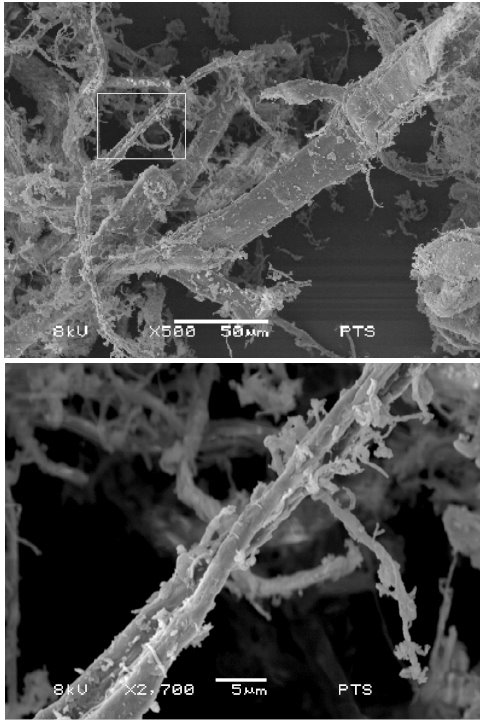
Setralit type 3: Natural fiber, ultrasonically treated, medium fibrillated (ramie)

=== Specification of a fibrillated natural fiber SETRALIT® NFU/31-2 ===
Natural fiber-pulp, cleaned, fibrillated

Quality characteristics		
DParameters given are mean values (individual spot samples fall within the range displayed)		
Feature	Mean Value	Range
Density(g/cm^{3})	1,35	1,25 - 1,45
Average length of reinforcing fibersn (mm)	2,5	1,00 - 5,00
Specific surface pursuant Blaine-Dyckerhof (*1) (cm^{2}/g)	9500	7000 - 12000
Moisture content(%): infrared balance, 2 g, 30 min at 110 °C	4	2,8 - 5,8
Bulk volume (ml/100g)	3500	2000 - 5000
Stamping volume (ml/100g: 5000 strokes with 100 g load)	1400	800 - 2000
Ignition loss	98,7	98,2 - 99,2
Ash content (%: 2 g, 2 h bei 800 °C)	1,3	8 - 1,8
Percentage of fibrils (*2) (weight-%)	25	10 - 50

(*1) * 10,000 cm2/g BD (Blaine-Dyckerhoff) is equivalent to ~ 6 m2/g BET (Brunauer, Emmett, Teller)

(*2) In this context “fibril” means a part of a fiber whose diameter is smaller than one third of the original fiber (mother or stem fiber). This line is drawn arbitrarily.

The mechanical strength values of Setralit-fibers reflect those of the primary material (e.g. flax, hemp, ramie fiber). The ultrasonic procedure does not lead to a damage of the fiber. Any losses in strength properties are due only to the mechanical wear during the second processing step.

=== Comparison fibrillated nature fiber – aramid pulp ===
(Application: friction linings) The characteristics of a fibrillated Setralit-fiber compared to a synthetic high-performance fiber (aramid pulp):

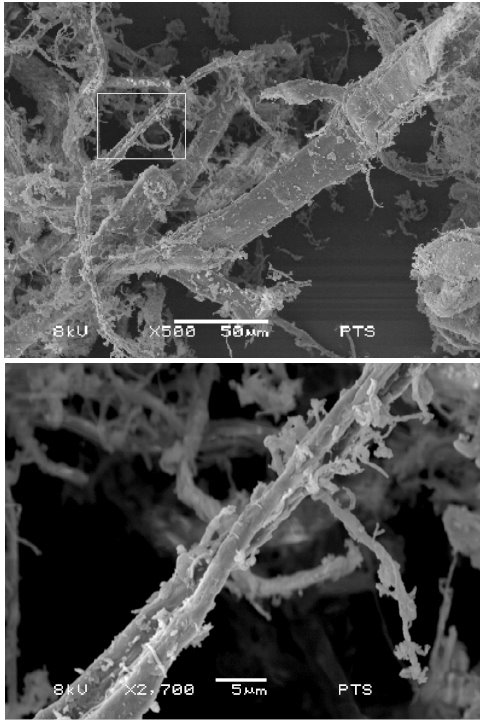
Setralit type 3: Natural fiber, ultrasonically treated, medium fibrillated (ramie)

	Natural fiber pulp		Aramid pulp	
Brand Name	Setralit®		Twaron®, Kevlar® a.o.	
Standard type	Setralit® NfU/31-2		Twaron® 1095	
Raw material	plant fiber		crude oil	
Production	ultrasonic treatment		chemical synthesis	
fibrillatin	mechanical		mechanical	
General proberties	Setralit®	reference	Twaron®	reference
Color	white		yellow	
Density[g/cm^{3}]	1,25 - 1,45	[1]	1,44	[2],[3]
Thickness of main fiber [μm]	15 - 20	[1]	13	[2]
Breaking strength [N/tex]	0,5 a	[1]	1,9	[2]
	1,2 b	[2]		
Tensile strength[Gpa]	2 b	[2]	2,76 - 3,15	[2]
	0,25 - 0,39 a	[4]	2,8	[3]
E-modulus [Gpa]	85 b	[2]	60 - 90	[2]
	12 - 26 a	[4]	80	[3]
Elongation at rupture [%]	2,4 b	[2]	3,4	[2]
	1,3 - 2,8 a	[4]	3,3	[3]
Decomposition temperature [°C]	270 c	[1]	500 c	[1]
			450	[3]
Type dependant properties	Setralit®		Twaron®	
mean length of mother fiber, weighed [μm]	7500	[1]	900 - 1900	[3]
Content of fibrils [%] d	~25	[1]	~25	[1]
Specific surface [cm^{2}/g]	10000 (BD)	[1]	5 – 8 m^{2}/g (BET)	[3]
Moisture content [%]	7	[1]	4 - 8	[3]
Qualitative behavior	Setralit®		Twaron®	
Behavior vs. water	hydrophilic		hydrophobic	
Wettability	high		low	
Electrostatic charge	low		high	
Toxicologie	harmless		problematic	
Disposability	compostable		hazardous waste	

[1] Own measurements of ECCO Gleittechnik GmbH.
[2] Sotton 1998: Flax a natural fibre with outstanding properties - Techtextil, Frankfurt. f
[3] Akzo: Twaron® - The power of aramid - Informational brochure.
[4] Final Report to Project: Ermittlung werkstoffkundlicher Merkmale von Flachsfasern “[Determination of flax fiber properties] - Institut für Kunststoffverarbeitung Aachen. f
Remarks
a Measured on fiber bundles
b Measured on elementary fibers
c Determined by thermal gravimetric analysis: here defined as temperature at 5% weight loss of dry fiber (heating-up rate: 5 °C/min).
d Here defined as mass of fibrils divided by total pulp mass.
e Determined by another method (Blaine-Dyckerhoff: flow resistance of N2) than used by Akzo (Brunauer, Emmett, Teller: absorption of N2); equivalent to ~ 6 m^{2}/g BET.
f The mechanical properties of elementary flax and hemp fibers are comparable.

== Applications ==
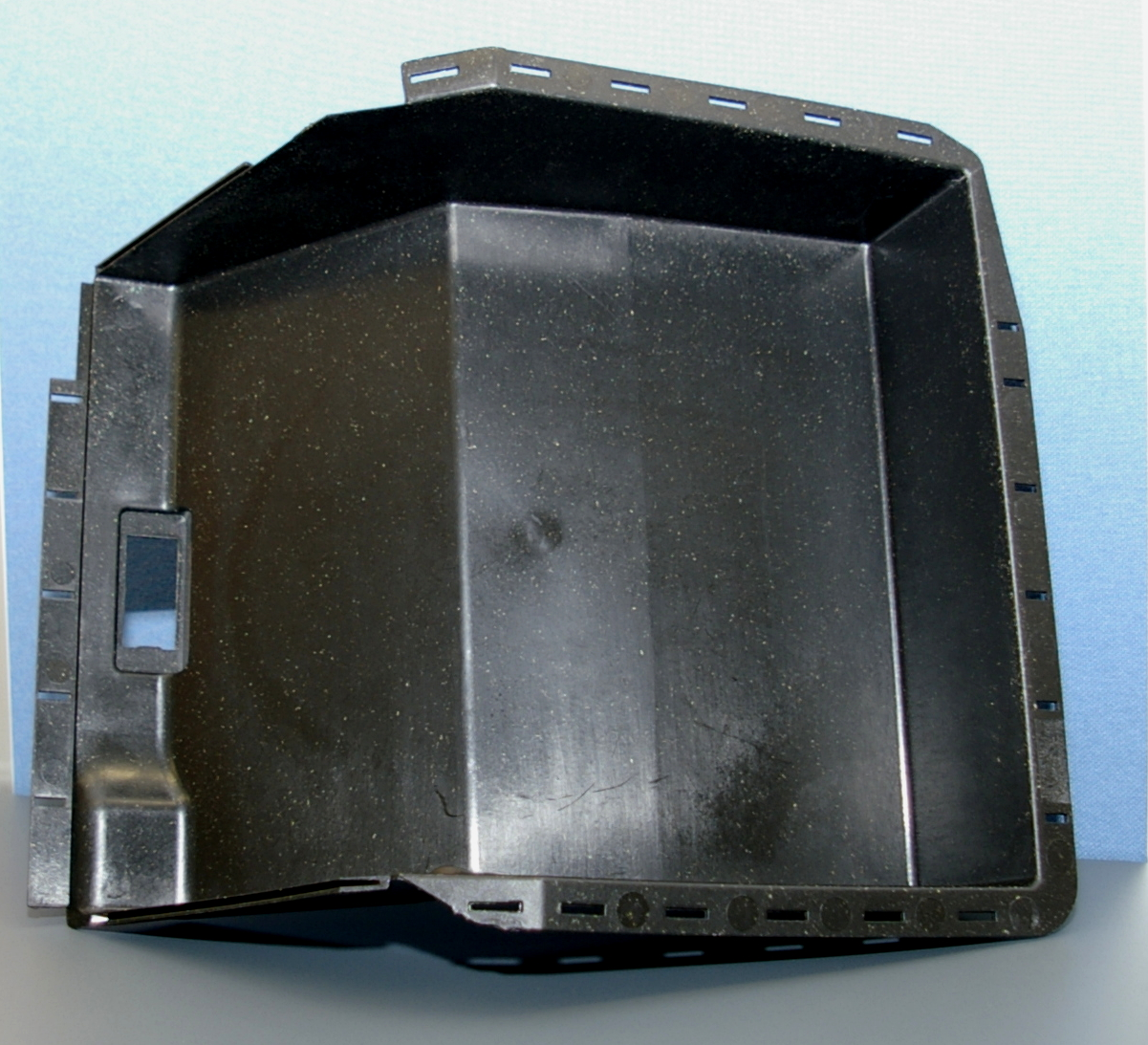
Example for a possible future use of: glove compartment made of hemp fiber reinforced plastic with polypropylene (PP) matrix produced by NF injection molding.

Setralit® is a raw material for industrial manufacturing and allows multifunctional utilization. It can be substituted expensive synthetic fiber (e.g. aramid) in challenging technical applications.

It can either be processed to form a fiber reinforced composite (semi-finished product, compound) or be used directly in final products (fiber-reinforced building materials, gaskets, fiber mats etc.).

Example for a possible future use of: glove compartment made of hemp fiber reinforced plastic with polypropylene (PP) matrix produced by NF injection molding.

'Areas of application for Setralit®-fibers

- Friction Linings: today they represent the main application area of Setralit. Its use is important in mechanical engineering, because abrasion is non-harmful to the health of the operating personnel in contrast to the materials used previously (see 3.2).
- Brake linings for vehicles consisting of many very different components including fillers and temperature resistant resins may contain Setralit fibers. The most important markets for brake linings are Europe, Japan and the United States, closely followed by emerging Asian economies India and China. Although the use of asbestos in friction linings has been prohibited in the EU since 1989, elevated asbestos levels are still detected there in areas which include a lot of braking like junctions, motorway exits, landing strips, or railroad stations.
- Building sector: plaster, dry mortar, fiber cement, concrete, aerated concrete, hard plaster, floor pavement, lime-sand brick, gypsum cardboard, insulating materials, insulating boards, dispersion paints.
- Plastics: semi-finished composites, prepregs, SMC, BMC, injection molding, formed parts, fiber reinforced polymers, especially biopolymers.
- Textiles: clothes, home textiles, industrial textiles, geotextiles, filters, spunlace mats, medical and sanitary articles.
- Chemical industry: friction linings, sealants, filtering agents, filler materials, thixotropic agents, bitumen, rubber, polishing agents, putties, adhesives.
- Paper: technical papers, cardboard boxes, specialty papers.
- Other applications: (especially for shives and other by-products): animal bedding, bulk solids, animal food (pectin et al.), biogas, energy generation.

The fiber length of the technical Setralit® fiber is linked to general application fields as follows:

- Long fiber, > 100 mm: textile applications

Yarn, cloth, fiber mats (e.g. heat insulation mats)

- Short fiber, 0.5 – 10 mm: reinforcement fiber, textile short fiber

Material reinforcement (e.g. plastic injection molding, aerated concrete), spunlace nonwoven

- Process fiber < 1 mm

Improvement of manufacturing processes (e.g. friction pads)

== Brand name Setralit ==
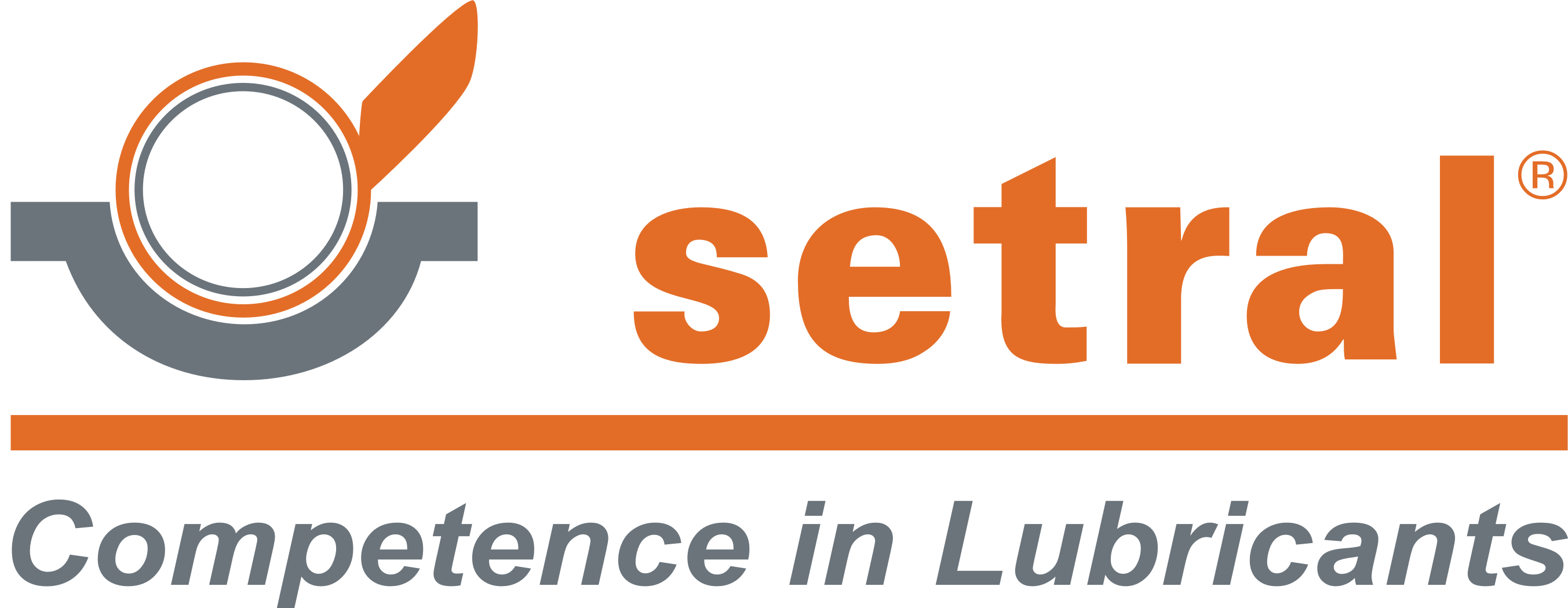
Setral logo

“SETRALIT®“ is a worldwide protected brand name of ECCO Gleittechnik GmbH and a registered trademark.

Original Setralit Fibers produced by ECCO enter the market also under other labeling.

== The company ==
Karl-Heinz Hensel launched the enterprise ECCO Gleittechnik GmbH in 1982, and their German daughter company Setral in 1984. Since 1985 the French society Sétral S.A. (today S.à.r.l.) belongs to the group, too. Whereas ECCO predominantly works in the fields of renewable fibers and alternative solid lubricants, mainly research and development, their affiliates Setral and Sétral S.à.r.l. develop, produce und sell high performance special lubricants and maintenance products all over the world.

== See also ==
- Fiber crop
- Injection molding
- Retting
