= Ollie C. Thomas =

American sports coach, athletics administrator, educator (1899–1989)

Biographical details
- Born: November 7, 1899; Agency, Missouri, U.S.
- Died: January 31, 1989

Playing career

Football
- c. 1922: Emporia State

Basketball
- c. 1922: Emporia State

Football
- c. 1922: Emporia State
- Position: End (football)

Coaching career (HC unless noted)

Football
- 1924–1928: South Dakota Mines
- ?: Winfield HS (KS)

Basketball
- 1929–1952: Winfield HS (KS)

Administrative career (AD unless noted)
- 1952–1963: Winfield HS (KS)

Head coaching record
- Overall: 23–15–1 (college football)

Accomplishments and honors

Championships
- 1 SDIC (1927)

Ollie Charles Thomas (November 7, 1899 – January 31, 1989) was an American football and basketball coach, athletics administrator, and educator. He served as the head football coach at the South Dakota School of Mines—now known as the South Dakota School of Mines and Technology—in Rapid City, South Dakota from 1924 to 1928, compiling a record of 23–15–1.

Thomas was born on November 7, 1899, in Agency, Missouri, to R. M. and Katie (Stanton) Thomas. He graduated from Atchison County Community High School in Effingham, Kansas, in 1918, and earned a Bachelor of Science degree from Kansas State Teachers College—now known as Emporia State University—in 1923. At Emporia State, Thomas lettered for three years in football, three years in baseball, and one in basketball. In football, was selected as an all-Kansas end in 1922.

Thomas coached at Winfield High School in Winfield, Kansas, from 1929 to 1952. There he mentored Gerald Tucker, Bob Brannum, and Bob Kenney, who all went on to be NCAA Men's Basketball All-Americans. After coaching, Thomas served as Winfield's athletic director for 11 years. He also coached football and taught history and government at the high school. He died on January 31, 1989.

== Head coaching record ==
=== College football ===
Year	Team	Overall	Conference	Standing	Bowl/playoffs
South Dakota Mines Hardrockers (South Dakota Intercollegiate Conference) (1924–1928)
1924	South Dakota Mines	6–2	5–1	T–3rd	
1925	South Dakota Mines	3–6	2–2	6th	
1926	South Dakota Mines	4–1–1	3–0	3rd	
1927	South Dakota Mines	7–1	6–0	1st	
1928	South Dakota Mines	3–5	2–3	9th	
South Dakota Mines:		23–15–1	18–5		
Total:		23–15–1			
National championship Conference title Conference division title or championship game berth
