= 1938 South Dakota State Jackrabbits football team =

American college football season

1938 South Dakota State Jackrabbits football
- Conference: North Central Conference
- Record: 3–5 (2–3 NCC)
- Head coach: Jack V. Barnes (1st season)
- Home stadium: State Field

1938 North Central Conference football standings
	Conf.					Overall
Team	W		L		T	W		L		T
South Dakota $	5	–	0	–	0	7	–	1	–	0
North Dakota	3	–	1	–	0	6	–	2	–	0
North Dakota Agricultural	3	–	1	–	0	5	–	4	–	0
South Dakota State	2	–	3	–	0	3	–	5	–	0
Morningside	1	–	3	–	1	4	–	3	–	1
Omaha	1	–	3	–	1	2	–	5	–	1
Iowa State Teachers	0	–	4	–	0	3	–	5	–	0
$ – Conference champion

The 1938 South Dakota State Jackrabbits football team was an American football team that represented South Dakota State University in the North Central Conference (NCC) during the 1938 college football season.

In its first season under head coach Jack V. Barnes, the team compiled a 3–5 record and was outscored by a total of 109 to 69.

== Schedule ==
Date	Opponent	Site	Result	Attendance	Source
September 16	at South Dakota Mines*	O'Harra Stadium; Rapid City, SD	L 7–18	4,000	
September 23	at North Dakota	Grand Forks, ND	L 0–37		
October 1	Omaha	State Field; Brookings, SD	W 28–6		
October 8	at St. Norbert*	West De Pere, WI	L 0–9		
October 14	at Morningside	Stock Yards Park; Sioux City, IA	W 14–13		
October 22	Moorhead State Teachers*	State Field; Brookings, SD	W 14–6		
October 29	South Dakota^{†}	State Field; Brookings, SD (rivalry, Hobo Day)	L 0–7	10,000	
November 12	North Dakota Agricultural	State Field; Brookings, SD (rivalry)	L 6–13		
*Non-conference game; ^{†}Homecoming
