= KTEQ =

KTEQ may refer to:

- KTEQ-FM, a radio station (91.3 FM) licensed to serve Rapid City, South Dakota, United States
- KTEQ-LP, a defunct low-power television station (channel 11) formerly licensed to serve Hope, Arkansas, United States
