= George Keller =

George Keller may refer to:

- George Keller (architect) (1842–1935), American architect and engineer
- George Keller (academic) (1928–2007), American scholar of higher education
- George M. Keller (1923–2008), chairman of Standard Oil Company of California
- George Frederick Keller (1846–?), political cartoonist
- George S. Keller (1881–?), clergyman and an American football player and coach
