= Dianne Dorland =

American chemical engineer

- Citizenship: American
- Education: South Dakota School of Mines and Technology (BS, MS) West Virginia University (PhD)
- Occupations: Chemical engineer Licensed Professional Engineer
- Known for: Chemical engineering and STEM education leadership

Dianne Dorland is an American chemical engineer and STEM education advocate. She served as the first female president of the American Institute of Chemical Engineers. She is also the former chair of the Department of Chemical Engineering at the University of Minnesota Duluth and the former dean of the Henry M. Rowan College of Engineering at Rowan University.

== Early life ==
Raised in Belle Fourche, South Dakota, Dorland was the second eldest of six children. Her father was an optometrist, and her mother was a homemaker. Dorland cites her mother as being a key influence for her entry into engineering, once advocating for Dorland's admittance into her school's technical drafting class. In high school, Dorland excelled in science and math and was a member of the Junior Engineering Technology Society.

== Education and career ==
Dorland enrolled in the South Dakota School of Mines and Technology in 1965 and majored in chemical engineering. Here, she worked as an undergraduate technician at the Institute of Atmospheric Sciences, where she discovered her interest in clouds and weather patterns. In 1969, she earned her B.S. in chemical engineering with a minor in meteorology, and in 1970, she earned her M.S. in chemical engineering. Combining her interests in meteorology and chemical engineering, Dorland's master's thesis explored "the importance of liquid water content on nucleation efficiencies of a wide variety of cloud seeding generators at temperatures between -5C to -20C."

After receiving these degrees, Dorland moved to West Virginia to pursue a career in industry. She first worked as a research and development engineer at Union Carbide Corporation in South Charleston. She then worked as a process engineer at DuPont in Belle. While at DuPont, Dorland worked with para-diaminodicyclohexylmethane (PACM), the precursor to Qiana Nylon. Contributing to the design and expansion of this chemical's manufacturing process, she provided operational and technical support for new equipment.

Dorland pivoted into academia in 1981, when she began teaching evening classes at West Virginia Institute of Technology. She was eventually offered a full-time position as an assistant professor there before attending West Virginia University to pursue a Ph.D. in chemical Engineering in 1983. During her Ph.D., Dorland studied coal processing methods under chemical engineering professor Al Stiller.

After receiving her PhD in 1985, Dorland briefly worked for the U.S. Department of Energy before joining the Department of Chemical Engineering at University of Minnesota Duluth as a teaching professor in 1986. She also worked for the university's Sea Grant as an environmental engineer, researching pollution prevention and hazardous waste management. Four years after joining the University of Minnesota Duluth, Dorland was appointed as the head of the school's chemical engineering department.

During her time at University of Minnesota Duluth, Dorland advised many state environmental remediation efforts. She served on the Minnesota Pollution Control Agency Great Lakes Initiative advisory committee, the Minnesota Department of Natural Resources taconite enhancement committee, and the Governor's Task Force on Mining and Minerals for Northeastern Minnesota. She was also the chair of the toxic technical advisory committee for the St. Louis Watershed Remedial Action Plan.

In 2000, Dorland assumed the role of dean at Rowan University's College of Engineering and maintained this position until her retirement in 2010. As dean, she worked to provide greater industry experience and connection for engineering students at Rowan.

=== STEM education advocacy ===
Dorland has given presentations on STEM education across the world. She has advocated for the integration of hands-on learning experiences into engineering curriculums. As dean of Rowan University's College of Engineering, she played a key role in advancing the school's engineering clinics, multidisciplinary classes designed for undergraduates to collaborate with certified engineers.

As dean, Dorland was also an active member of the American Society for Engineering Education and was elected to its executive committee of Engineering Deans Council in 2006.

Drawing from her experience as a department chair and university dean, Dorland co-authored A Toolkit for Deans and A Toolkit for Provosts. In these informative guides, she offered advice and resources for effective leadership within academic institutions.

An advocate for youth STEM education, Dorland served as the New Jersey State Affiliate for Project Lead the Way, a nonprofit that develops STEM curriculums for preschool through grade 12. She also represented Rowan on the New Jersey Consortium for Engineering Education, a working group focused on promoting STEM education and establishing engineering curriculum standards within high schools and other secondary education institutions.

Dorland has also supported female participation in STEM fields. While at the University of Minnesota Duluth, she helped develop a peer mentorship program for women within the College of Science and Engineering.

=== AIChE ===
Dorland joined the American Institute of Chemical Engineers (AIChE) in 1969. During her early years in AIChE, she was a member of the Planning Process Team and the Program Committee's executive board. She also served as meeting program chair of the 1997 Annual Meeting in Los Angeles. Later, she became a member of AIChE's board of directors. In 2002, she served as president-elect, and in 2003, she became the first female president of AIChE.

AlChE was not the only engineering society with a female president in 2003. For the first time in history, all presidents of the major engineering societies were women: Dianne Dorland as the first female president of AIChE, Susan Skemp as the second female president of the American Society of Mechanical Engineers, Teresa Helmlinger as the first female president of the National Society of Professional Engineers, LeEarl Bryant as the first female president of the Institute of Electrical and Electronics Engineers, and Patricia Galloway as the first female president of the American Society of Civil Engineers.

To celebrate this historical event, Patricia Galloway contacted author Sybil Hatch to write a book celebrating female engineers. Dorland, along with the other engineering society presidents, collaborated with Galloway to procure funding and publicize the book. In 2006, this book, titled Changing Our World: True Stories of Women Engineers, was released as part of the Extraordinary Women Engineers Project. Dorland, Galloway, and hundreds of other female engineers were celebrated in this book.

== Personal life ==
Dorland is known for her adventurous spirit. During graduate school, she had a private pilot's license and Cessna-172 airplane, which she would fly with her colleagues. She was also an avid scuba diver.

Dorland's hobbies include gardening, reading, and birding. She has two children.

== Awards and recognition ==
- Gloucester County Woman of Achievement (2010)
- ConocoPhillips Lecturer (2008)
- Delaware Valley Engineers Week Council Engineer of the Year (2008) - first time female recipient
- Southern New Jersey Development Council Distinguished Leadership Award for Leadership in Business (2005)
- South Dakota School of Mines and Technology Distinguished Alumni Award (2001)
