= John Redmon =

American football player and coach (1892–1949)

Biographical details
- Born: January 4, 1892; Frankfort, Indiana, U.S.
- Died: December 17, 1949 (aged 57); Fort Benjamin Harrison, Indiana, U.S.

Playing career
- 1913–1915: Indiana
- 1916–1917: Wabash A. A.
- 1919: Pine Village A. C.
- Positions: Guard, center, tackle

Coaching career (HC unless noted)
- 1921: South Dakota Mines

Administrative career (AD unless noted)
- 1921–1922: South Dakota Mines

John Thomas "Doc" Redmon (January 4, 1892 – December 17, 1949) was an American football player and coach. He served as the head football coach at the South Dakota School of Mines in 1921. He also served as the school's athletic director during the 1921–22 academic year.

Redmon played college football at Indiana University and professionally for the Wabash Athletic Association and Pine Village Athletic Club
