= Kenneth M. Harkness =

American football coach

Biographical details
- Born: August 16, 1899; Webster, South Dakota, U.S.
- Died: March 18, 1988 (aged 88); San Bernardino County, California, U.S.

Coaching career (HC unless noted)
- 1918: South Dakota Mines

Kenneth McKenzie Harkness (August 16, 1899 – March 18, 1988) was an American football coach, college professor, and researcher.

Harkness served as the head football coach at the South Dakota School of Mines and Technology in Rapid City, South Dakota during the 1918 season.
