= Fred Gushurst =

American football player and coach (1890–1977)

Biographical details
- Born: July 22, 1890; Lead, South Dakota, U.S.
- Died: December 28, 1977 (aged 87)

Playing career
- 1912–1913: Notre Dame
- Position: Halfback

Coaching career (HC unless noted)
- 1917: South Dakota Mines
- 1919–1920: South Dakota Mines

Fred W. Gushurst (July 22, 1890 – December 28, 1977) was an American football player and coach. He served as the head football coach at the South Dakota School of Mines in Deadwood, South Dakota in 1917 and from 1919 to 1920. Gushurst played college football at the University of Notre Dame in South Bend, Indiana.
