= Marvin Lewellyn =

American football coach

Biographical details
- Born: February 11, 1919; Chariton, Iowa, U.S.
- Died: August 28, 2010 (aged 91); North Mankato, Minnesota, U.S.
- Education: Northern Iowa (1941); Iowa (1949)

Coaching career (HC unless noted)
- 1947–1951: South Dakota Mines
- 1952–1957: Wayne State (NE)

Head coaching record
- Overall: 42–44–8

Accomplishments and honors

Championships
- 2 SDIC (1947, 1951)

Marvin "Barney" Lewellyn (February 11, 1919 – August 28, 2010) was an American football coach. He served as the head football coach at the South Dakota School of Mines in Rapid City, South Dakota from 1947 to 1951. He moved to Wayne, Nebraska to become the head football coach at Wayne State College from 1952 to 1957.

== Head coaching record ==
Year	Team	Overall	Conference	Standing	Bowl/playoffs
South Dakota Mines Hardrockers (South Dakota Intercollegiate Conference) (1947–1951)
1947	South Dakota Mines	4–2–2	3–1	T–1st	
1948	South Dakota Mines	5–3	2–2	T–3rd	
1949	South Dakota Mines	2–3–2	1–1–2	T–4th	
1950	South Dakota Mines	3–5	2–4	6th	
1951	South Dakota Mines	8–0	6–0	1st	
South Dakota Mines:		22–13–5	14–8–2		
Wayne State Wildcats (Nebraska College Conference) (1952–1957)
1952	Wayne State	4–5	3–4	T–5th	
1953	Wayne State	5–3–1	4–2–1	2nd	
1954	Wayne State	5–4	3–4	T–4th	
1955	Wayne State	4–4–1	4–3	4th	
1956	Wayne State	1–8	0–7	8th	
1957	Wayne State	1–7–1	0–6–1	8th	
Wayne State:		20–31–3	14–26–2		
Total:		42–44–8			
National championship Conference title Conference division title or championship game berth
