= Tim Osswald =

Tim Andreas Osswald (born June 6, 1958, Bogotá, Colombia) is a mechanical engineer and the K. K. and Cindy Wang Professor in the Department of Mechanical Engineering at the University of Wisconsin-Madison. He is also honorary professor at the University of Erlangen-Nuremberg in Germany and the National University of Colombia. Osswald has authored 12 books in the field of polymer engineering and teaches polymer processing and designing with polymers. His research includes modeling and simulation in polymer processing, engineering design with plastics, sustainability and biopolymers.

Osswald is co-founder and present co-director of the Polymer Engineering Center. The center is dedicated to the solution of problems in the plastics industry through education, training, and research at the College of Engineering at the University of Wisconsin-Madison since 2001.

Osswald serves as the English-language editor of the Journal of Plastics Technology and as an editor for the Americas of the Journal of Polymer Engineering.

== Education ==
Osswald attended the South Dakota School of Mines and Technology from 1978 to 1982, where he received a B.S. degree and a M.S. degree in mechanical engineering. In 1987 he received a Ph.D. in mechanical engineering from the University of Illinois at Urbana-Champaign. Between 1987 and 1989 he was an Alexander von Humboldt research fellow at the Institute for Plastics Processing (Institut für Kunststoffverarbeitung) in Aachen, Germany.

== Awards and honors ==
Osswald was recipient of the Presidential Young Investigator Award in 1991 granted by the National Science Foundation. In 2001 he was the first academic to receive the VDI-K Dr-Richard-Escales-Preis (de:Ernst Richard Escales) (Plastics Division of the German Engineering Association, de:Verein Deutscher Ingenieure). In 2006 he was named an honorary professor at the University of Erlangen-Nuremberg in Germany and in 2010 honorary professor at the National University of Colombia.

Osswald serves as faculty advisor to Theta Tau professional fraternity, to the Society of Hispanic Professional Engineers and to the Society of Plastics Engineers.

== Books ==
Osswald is author and co-author of several influential books in plastics engineering including the International Plastics Handbook. His work has been translated into many foreign languages, including Spanish, German, Russian, Chinese, Korean and Japanese.

- “Polymer Rheology: Fundamentals and Applications”, Hanser Verlag, (2014). ISBN 978-1569905173
- “Understanding Polymer Processing”, Hanser Verlag, (2010). ISBN 978-1569904725
- “Plastics Testing and Characterization - Industrial Applications”, with A. Naranjo, M. Noriega, A. Roldán and J. Sierra, Hanser Verlag, (2006). ISBN 978-1569904251
- “Kunststoff-Taschenbuch”, with E. Schmachtenberg, E. Baur, Hanser Verlag, (2007, 2nd ed. 2013). ISBN 978-3446434424
- “Injection Molding Handbook”, with L.S. Turng, and P.J. Gramann, Hanser Verlag, (2001, Russian and Chinese translation, 2006, 2nd ed. 2008). ISBN 978-1569904206
- “International Plastics Handbook” with E. Schmachtenberg and E. Baur, Hanser Verlag, (2006). ISBN 978-1569903995
- “Polymer Processing - Modeling and Simulation” with J.P. Hernandez, Hanser Verlag, (2006). ISBN 978-1569903988
- “Compression Molding”, with B.A. Davis, P.J. Gramann and C.A. Rios, Hanser Verlag, (2003). ISBN 978-1569903469
- “Polymer Processing Fundamentals”, Hanser Verlag, (1998, Spanish translation 2008). ISBN 978-1569902622
- “Materials Science of Polymers for Engineers”, with G. Menges, Hanser Verlag, (1996, Japanese edition 1997, Korean edition 1999, 2nd ed. 2003, 3rd ed. 2012). ISBN 978-1569903483
- ”An Introduction to Experimental Analysis of Stress and Strain” with J.J. Comer and R.L. Pendleton, SDSM & T Press, (1983).

Osswald is also the series editor of Plastics Pocket Power (Hanser Verlag, 2001), which currently includes 6 books.

== Personal life ==
Osswald was born in Bogotá, Colombia. At the age of 4, his family moved to Cúcuta, Colombia. After graduating from High School, he was an exchange student in Rapid City, South Dakota with Florida Cultural Exchange for one year. He returned to Rapid City to get his B.S. and M.Sc. degrees in 1977. He then continued his graduate studies in Urbana, Illinois where he met his wife.

Osswald and his wife, Diane, have a son, Paul, and a daughter, Ruthie, and were married in Aachen, Germany in 1988. They live in Madison, Wisconsin.
