= Gary L. Boner =

American football player (1940–2005)

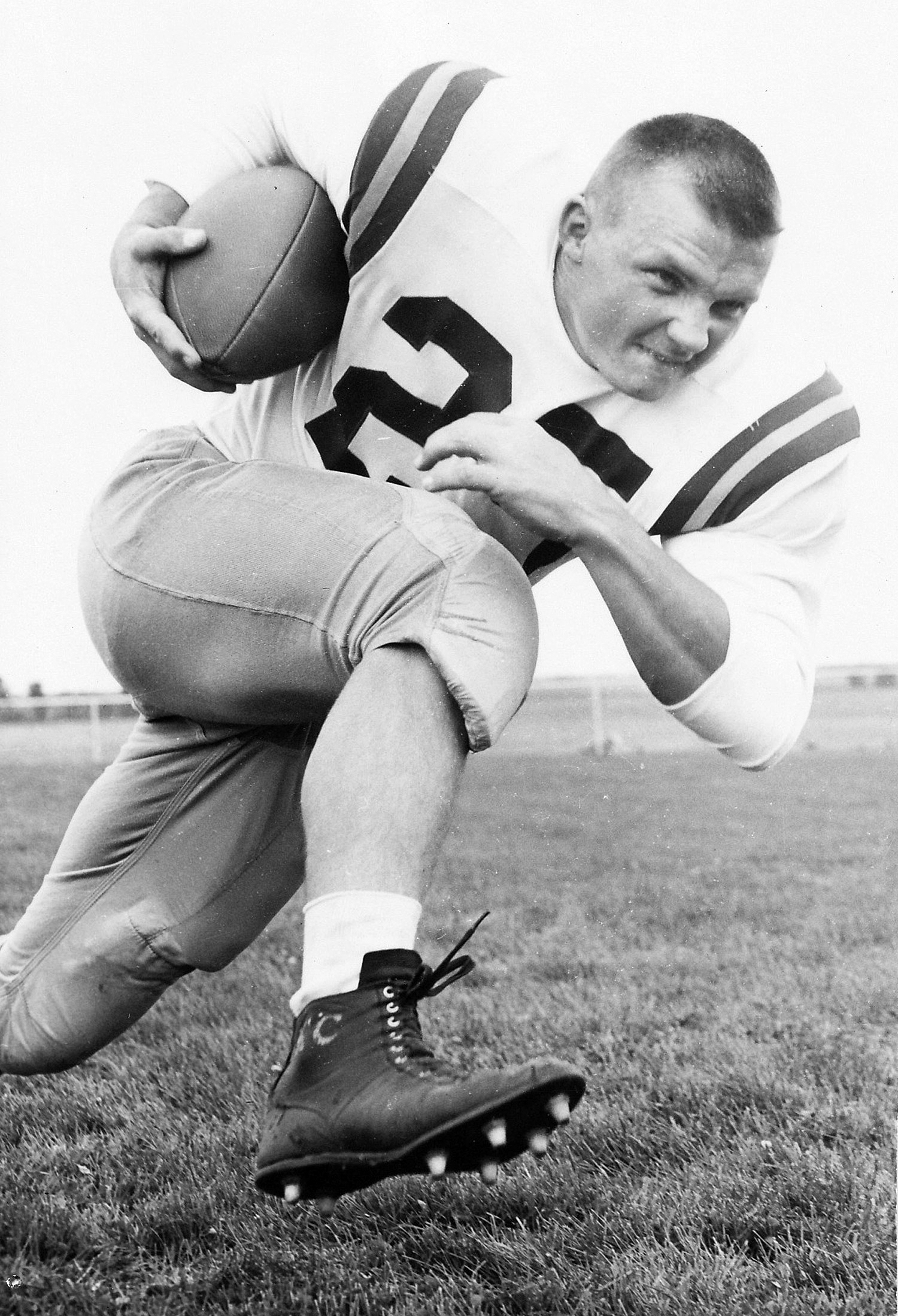
- Boner as a player at South Dakota State, 1962

Biographical details
- Born: October 31, 1940; Hot Springs, South Dakota, U.S.
- Died: May 16, 2005 (aged 64); Rapid City, South Dakota, U.S.

Playing career
- 1960–1961: South Dakota Mines
- 1962–1963: South Dakota State

Coaching career (HC unless noted)
- 1965–1968: Rapid City HS (SD) (assistant)
- 1969: Stevens HS (SD)
- 1970: South Dakota Mines (assistant)
- 1971–1989: South Dakota Mines

Head coaching record
- Overall: 92–73–7 (college)

Accomplishments and honors

Awards
- SDSM&T Sports Hall of Fame (2004); SDSA College Coach of the Year (1981); South Dakota Sports Hall of Fame (2011)

Records
- Most wins in South Dakota Mines history (92); Most games coached in South Dakota Mines history (172)

Gary L. Boner (October 31, 1940 – May 16, 2005) was an American football player and coach. He was the longest-tenured head football coach for South Dakota School of Mines & Technology (SDSM&T) in Rapid City, South Dakota, serving from 1971 to 1989. With a record of 92–73–7, he won more games than any football coach in SDSM&T history.

== Playing career ==
As a player, Boner spent two seasons at SDSM&T before transferring to South Dakota State University (SDSU). At SDSU he was the leading rusher (497 yards) on the 1962 team that tied for the North Central Conference title. Counting receiving and kick/punt returns, he had more than 1,000 all-purpose yards that season. He was all-conference at both SDSM&T and SDSU. He graduated from SDSU with a B.S. in Mathematics and an M.S. in Physical Education. After graduation, he had a tryout with the Minnesota Vikings.

== Coaching career ==
Boner started his coaching career as an assistant football and basketball coach at Rapid City High School (now Rapid City Central High School) in 1965. In 1969, he became the first head football coach at the new Rapid City Stevens High School, guiding the Raiders to a 6–3 record. He joined the staff at SDSM&T as an assistant football coach in 1970 and became the head coach in 1971.

Boner's teams were 73–32–4 in the South Dakota Intercollegiate Conference (SDIC) and won seven SDIC titles (1974, 1975, 1980, 1981, 1982, 1984, and 1985), the most in the school's history. His 1980 team was 8–1, while his 1978, 1981, 1982 and 1984 teams each won seven games. The SDSM&T Hardrockers won 13 games in a row over the 1980–81 seasons and reached the No. 3 rating in the National Association of Intercollegiate Athletics football poll in 1981. Boner led SDSM&T to 13 consecutive winning seasons from 1973 to 1985.

He was the NAIA District 12 Coach of the Year in 1980, and the South Dakota Sportswriters Association's College Coach of the Year in 1981. He retired from coaching in 1990.

He was among the first inductees of the South Dakota School of Mines & Technology Sports Hall of Fame in 2004, and was posthumously inducted into the South Dakota Sports Hall of Fame in 2011.

== Personal life ==
Boner married Linda Richtman on July 16, 1973, and had two sons. Following his retirement from football in 1990, he taught mathematics at Central High School from 1991 until his retirement in 1997.

An avid golfer since his 20s, Boner recorded five holes-in-one over his lifetime.

He died in Rapid City on May 16, 2005, at the age of 64.

== Head coaching record ==
=== College ===
Year	Team	Overall	Conference	Standing	Bowl/playoffs
South Dakota Mines Hardrockers (South Dakota Intercollegiate Conference) (1971–1989)
1971	South Dakota Mines	3–4–1	3–2–1	3rd	
1972	South Dakota Mines	3–6	3–3	T–3rd	
1973	South Dakota Mines	4–3–2	3–1–1	2nd	
1974	South Dakota Mines	6–2–1	4–0–1	1st	
1975	South Dakota Mines	5–4	4–1	T–1st	
1976	South Dakota Mines	4–4–1	2–3	4th	
1977	South Dakota Mines	6–3	4–1	2nd	
1978	South Dakota Mines	7–2–1	5–1	2nd	
1979	South Dakota Mines	5–4–1	4–1–1	3rd	
1980	South Dakota Mines	8–1	6–0	1st	
1981	South Dakota Mines	7–2	5–1	T–1st	
1982	South Dakota Mines	7–2	7–0	1st	
1983	South Dakota Mines	5–4	5–2	3rd	
1984	South Dakota Mines	7–2	5–1	T–1st	
1985	South Dakota Mines	6–4	5–1	1st	
1986	South Dakota Mines	3–6	3–2	2nd	
1987	South Dakota Mines	4–5	3–2		
1988	South Dakota Mines	1–8	1–4	5th	
1989	South Dakota Mines	1–8	1–4	5th	
South Dakota Mines:		92–74–7	73–30–4		
Total:		92–74–7			
National championship Conference title Conference division title or championship game berth
