= 1938 North Dakota Agricultural Bison football team =

American college football season

1938 North Dakota Agricultural Bison football
- Conference: North Central Conference
- Record: 5–4 (3–1 NCC)
- Head coach: Casey Finnegan (10th season)
- Captains: Ray Hawkins; Ernie Wheeler
- Home stadium: Dacotah Field

1938 North Central Conference football standings
	Conf.					Overall
Team	W		L		T	W		L		T
South Dakota $	5	–	0	–	0	7	–	1	–	0
North Dakota	3	–	1	–	0	6	–	2	–	0
North Dakota Agricultural	3	–	1	–	0	5	–	4	–	0
South Dakota State	2	–	3	–	0	3	–	5	–	0
Morningside	1	–	3	–	1	4	–	3	–	1
Omaha	1	–	3	–	1	2	–	5	–	1
Iowa State Teachers	0	–	4	–	0	3	–	5	–	0
$ – Conference champion

The 1938 North Dakota Agricultural Bison football team was an American football team that represented North Dakota Agricultural College (now known as North Dakota State University) in the North Central Conference (NCC) during the 1938 college football season. In its tenth season under head coach Casey Finnegan, the team compiled a 5–4 record (3–1 against NCC opponents) and tied for second place out of seven teams in the NCC. The team played its home games at Dacotah Field in Fargo, North Dakota.

== Schedule ==
Date	Opponent	Site	Result	Attendance	Source
September 23	Moorhead State*	Dacotah Field; Fargo, ND	W 20–13		
October 1	at Winnipeg Blue Bombers*	Osborne Stadium; Winnipeg, MB	L 6–16		
October 8	at Idaho*	Neale Stadium; Moscow, ID	L 0–27	7,000	
October 14	Iowa State Teachers	Dacotah Field; Fargo, ND	W 14–7		
October 21	Colorado State–Greeley*	Dacotah Field; Fargo, ND	W 12–0		
October 29	North Dakota	Dacotah Field; Fargo, ND (Nickel Trophy)	W 17–13	8,000	
November 5	at South Dakota	Inman Field; Vermillion, SD	L 0–20		
November 12	at South Dakota State	State Field; Brookings, SD (rivalry)	W 13–7		
November 19	at Creighton*	Creighton Stadium; Omaha, NE	L 0–38		
*Non-conference game
