= Howard Fulweiler =

American football player, coach, and clergyman (1885–1936)

Biographical details
- Born: September 18, 1885; Camden, New Jersey, U.S.
- Died: April 17, 1936 (aged 50); Philadelphia, Pennsylvania, U.S.

Playing career
- 1905–1908: Penn

Coaching career (HC unless noted)
- 1911: South Dakota Mines

Accomplishments and honors

Championships
- National (1908)

Howard Wells Fulweiler (September 18, 1885 – April 17, 1936) was an American football player and coach and clergyman. He served as the head football coach at the South Dakota School of Mines in Rapid City, South Dakota in 1911. Fulweiler was a member of the University of Pennsylvania football team from 1905 to 1908. He later served as a pastor in South Dakota and the surrounding region.
