= Erv Mondt =

American football coach

Biographical details
- Born: October 2, 1938 (age 88)
- Education: Colorado (BA, 1961)

Coaching career (HC unless noted)
- 1961–1962: Evergreen HS (CO)
- 1963–1967: Northeastern (CO) (assistant)
- 1968: Wyoming (GA)
- 1969–1970: Alamogordo HS (NM)
- 1971: Montrose HS (CO)
- 1972–1974: Longmont HS (CO)
- 1975: Southern Colorado (assistant)
- 1976–1982: North Dakota (assistant)
- 1983–1988: Morningside
- 1989: Sioux City North HS (IA) (DC)
- 1990–1994: South Dakota Mines
- 1995–1997: Holyoke HS (CO)
- 1998–2002: Valley HS (CO)

Head coaching record
- Overall: 30–80–1 (college)

Accomplishments and honors

Championships
- 1 SDIC (1991)

Ervin Mondt (born October 2, 1938) is an American former football coach. He served as the head football coach at Morningside College in Sioux City, Iowa from 1983 to 1988 and South Dakota School of Mines and Technology in Rapid City, South Dakota from 1990 to 1994, compiling a career college football coaching record of 30–80–1. Mondt also coached high school football over a span of four decades in the states of Colorado and New Mexico. He retired from coaching in 2002.

== Coaching career ==
Mondt was the head football coach at Morningside College in Sioux City, Iowa. He held that position for six seasons, from 1983 to 1988. His coaching record at Morningside was 19–46–1.

Following is his career at Morningside, he continued his career as head football coach at the South Dakota School of Mines and Technology for five seasons, from 1990 to 1994. He posted a record of 11–34 before stepping down.

== Head coaching record ==
=== College ===
Year	Team	Overall	Conference	Standing	Bowl/playoffs
Morningside Chiefs (North Central Conference) (1983–1988)
1983	Morningside	1–10	1–8	10th	
1984	Morningside	6–5	5–4	5th	
1985	Morningside	7–3–1	5–3–1	4th	
1986	Morningside	1–10	1–8	10th	
1987	Morningside	4–7	3–6	8th	
1988	Morningside	0–11	0–9	10th	
Morningside:		19–46–1	15–38–1		
South Dakota Mines Hardrockers (South Dakota Intercollegiate Conference) (1990–1994)
1990	South Dakota Mines	0–9	0–5	6th	
1991	South Dakota Mines	4–5	4–1	T–1st	
1992	South Dakota Mines	2–7	1–4	T–5th	
1993	South Dakota Mines	3–6	2–3	4th	
1994	South Dakota Mines	2–7	1–4		
South Dakota Mines:		11–34	8–17		
Total:		30–80–1			
National championship Conference title Conference division title or championship game berth
