= 1938 South Dakota Coyotes football team =

American college football season

1938 South Dakota Coyotes football

NCC champion
- Conference: North Central Conference
- Record: 7–1 (5–0 NCC)
- Head coach: Harry Gamage (5th season)
- Home stadium: Inman Field

1938 North Central Conference football standings
	Conf.					Overall
Team	W		L		T	W		L		T
South Dakota $	5	–	0	–	0	7	–	1	–	0
North Dakota	3	–	1	–	0	6	–	2	–	0
North Dakota Agricultural	3	–	1	–	0	5	–	4	–	0
South Dakota State	2	–	3	–	0	3	–	5	–	0
Morningside	1	–	3	–	1	4	–	3	–	1
Omaha	1	–	3	–	1	2	–	5	–	1
Iowa State Teachers	0	–	4	–	0	3	–	5	–	0
$ – Conference champion

The 1938 South Dakota Coyotes football team was an American football team that represented the University of South Dakota in the North Central Conference (NCC) during the 1938 college football season. In its fifth season under head coach Harry Gamage, the team compiled a 7–1 record (5–0 against NCC opponents), won the NCC championship, and outscored opponents by a total of 125 to 40. The team played its home games at Inman Field in Vermillion, South Dakota.

== Schedule ==
Date	Opponent	Site	Result	Attendance	Source
September 24	Dakota Wesleyan*	Inman Field; Vermillion, SD	W 19–0		
October 1	at Creighton*	Creighton Stadium; Omaha, NE	L 0–26	8,000	
October 8	Wayne State (NE)*	Inman Field; Vermillion, SD	W 33–12		
October 15	at Omaha	Omaha, NE	W 7–0		
October 22	Morningside	Inman Field; Vermillion, SD (Dakota Day)	W 13–0		
October 29	at South Dakota State	Brookings, SD (Hobo Day)	W 7–0	10,000	
November 5	North Dakota Agricultural	Inman Field; Vermillion, SD	W 20–0		
November 12	at Iowa State Teachers	Cedar Falls, IA	W 26–2		
*Non-conference game
