= George S. Keller =

American football player, coach, and clergyman

Biographical details
- Born: May 16, 1881; New York, New York, U.S.
- Education: Philadelphia Divinity (1907)

Playing career
- 1902: Penn

Coaching career (HC unless noted)
- 1908–1909: South Dakota Mines
- 1910: Huron

Head coaching record
- Overall: 10–1

George Sherman Keller (born May 16, 1881) was an American clergyman and college football player and coach. He played varsity football at the University of Pennsylvania for one season before earning his undergraduate degree and enrolling at the Philadelphia Divinity School He graduated with his seminary degree in 1907 and served as a pastor at several locations in Minnesota and South Dakota. Keller spent two seasons (1908–1909) as the head football coach at the South Dakota School of Mines in Rapid City, South Dakota, where he compiled a record of 10–1. He also served as the head football coach at Huron University in Huron, South Dakota in 1910.
