= Franklin R. Carpenter =

Mining specialist

Franklin Reuben Carpenter (November 5, 1848 at Parkersburg, Virginia – April 1, 1910 in Chicago, Illinois), was a notable mining specialist. He received his advanced academic education at Ohio University, earning the Master of Arts and Doctor of Philosophy degrees. After graduation, he moved to the West, where he explored the geology and mining potential of the Black Hills and served as President, Dean of Faculty, and Professor of Geology at the Dakota School of Mines in Rapid City, South Dakota. He invented a new smelting process, authored a number of works on geology and papers on mining and smelting, and was elected a Fellow of the Geological Society of America. A descendant of John Carpenter (c1713-1760) of Deptford, Gloucester County, New Jersey and of a Carpenter family with a tradition of ironworking, he married Annette Howe on December 23, 1874 in Arapahoe County, Colorado; they were the parents of eleven children.
