= Jack Weyland =

American journalist

Jack Arnold Weyland
- Born: 1940 (age 85–86); Butte, Montana, U.S.
- Education: Montana State University (BS); Brigham Young University (PhD)
- Spouse: Sheryl
- Children: 5

Jack Arnold Weyland (born 1940) is a retired professor of physics at Brigham Young University–Idaho (BYU–Idaho) and a member of the Church of Jesus Christ of Latter-day Saints. He was a prolific and well-known author of fiction for LDS audiences, including many novels and short stories, mostly placed in contemporary settings. His novel Charly was made into a feature film in 2002.

== Biography ==
Weyland was born in Butte, Montana. He graduated from Billings Senior High School and then attended Montana State University where he majored in Physics. Upon graduating he served a mission for the LDS Church in New York and Pennsylvania. After completing his mission he went to BYU and received his Ph.D. in physics.

While attending BYU, Weyland decided to take an elective course in creative writing. After a few weeks Weyland realized he was in trouble; he was not a very good writer. Weyland said, "The one time I ventured to tell my instructor I wanted to write LDS fiction, he said, 'You’re not serious, are you?' Certainly a fair question based on what he had seen of my writing. I became discouraged and dropped the course and didn’t think about writing again for several years."

He married Sherry and they had a daughter named Barbara. After Barbara was born they left BYU and went to South Dakota, where Weyland taught physics at the South Dakota School of Mines and Technology. While in South Dakota they had four more children, Dan, Brad, Jed, and Josie.

In the summer of 1971 Wayland had the opportunity to work for the BYU physics department doing high-pressure research. While at BYU Weyland decided to take a correspondence writing course. "Especially I wanted it to be by correspondence. Never again would I tell anyone face to face that I wanted to write. The course cost me, as I remember it, $37.50. In addition there was the typewriter to rent." Weyland decided that he wanted to write an article for the New Era magazine.

Weyland's first two stories that he sent into New Era were accepted, but his third entry was rejected. After having this rejection he was done writing, but the next summer he found himself submitting another article to New Era that was accepted.

Each summer Weyland found himself writing in his spare time. In 1979 he made a goal to write a novel that would be published by October, he finished his first novel, Charly. After completing his goal of writing a novel Weyland said, "The Lord blesses us richly for any service we give. He helps us discover talents we never know existed within us." In his writing career, Weyland has published about three dozen books and more than 50 short stories in the New Era.

Although successful in his LDS publications, Weyland has continued to teach physics. He taught at Ricks College, (now BYU–Idaho) from 1993 to 2005, and has even continued teaching after retirement as a "campus service missionary". He explained "I enjoyed physics then and still do today. It is, after all, what I spend most of my time doing." He and his wife have also served as missionaries for the Church Educational System in Long Island, New York and Philadelphia, Pennsylvania.

Weyland also writes a column on science topics for the local newspaper, the Rexburg Standard Journal.

== Publications ==
- Weyland, Jack (1980). Charly. Deseret Book. ISBN 0877478147.
- —— (1981). Sam. Deseret Book. ISBN 0875791220.
- —— (1982). The Reunion. Deseret Book. ISBN 0877478929.
- —— (1983). Pepper Tide. Deseret Book. ASIN B000H55K6M.
- —— (1985). The Understudy. Deseret Book. ISBN 087747673X.
- —— (1986). Last of the Big-Time Spenders. Deseret Book. ISBN 0875790313.
- —— (1987). Sara - Whenever I Hear Your Name. Deseret Book. ISBN 0875790704.
- —— (1988). Brenda at the Prom. Deseret Book. ISBN 0875791506.
- —— (1988). A New Dawn. Deseret Book. ISBN 0875791638.
- —— (1989). Stephanie. Deseret Book. ISBN 0875792030.
- —— (1990). Michelle & Debra. Deseret Book. ISBN 0875799590.
- —— (1992). Kimberly. Deseret Book. ISBN 0875795994.
- —— (1993). Nicole. Deseret Book. ISBN 0875797873.
- —— (1995). On the Run. Deseret Book. ISBN 0875798918.
- —— (1996). Night on Lone Wolf Mountain and Other Short Stories. Deseret Book. ISBN 1573451134.
- —— (1996). Lean On Me. Deseret Book. ISBN 1573452149.
- —— (1997). Brittany. Deseret Book. ISBN 157345303X.
- —— (1998). Jake. Deseret Book. ISBN 1573454478.
- —— (1999). Emily. Deseret Book. ISBN 1573455768.
- —— (2000). Ashley & Jen. Bookcraft Pubs. ISBN 1573458031.
- —— (2001). Megan. Bookcraft Pubs. ISBN 1570087326.
- —— (2003). Cheyenne in New York. Deseret Book. ASIN B003VYBPV0.
- —— (2003). Adam's Story: A Novel. Deseret Book. ISBN 159038248X.
- —— (2004). Everyone Gets Married in the End. Horizon Publishers. ISBN 0882907506.
- —— (2005). Saving Kristen. Deseret Book. ISBN 1590384261.
- —— (2006). Alone, Together. Deseret Book. ISBN 1590388496.
- —— (2008). As Always, Dave. Deseret Book. ISBN 978-1590388495.
- —— (2009). Brianna, My Brother, and the Blog. Deseret Book. ISBN 978-1606411407.
- —— (2009). The Samaritan Bueno. Granite Publishing & Distribution. ISBN 978-1599360423.
- —— (2010). Cameron Meets Madison. Granite Publishing & Distribution. ISBN 978-1599360546.
- —— (2010). It All Started with Autumn Jones. Deseret Book. ISBN 978-1606418406.
- —— (2011). Mackenzie for Congress. Amazon Digital Services, Inc. ASIN B006287976.
- —— (2012). Favorites from Forever. Horizon Publishers & Distributors, Inc. ASIN B007TCKK8O.
- —— (2012). Charly. Shadow Mountain. ASIN B0073X0HN2.
- —— (2012). Heather 101. Deseret Book. ASIN B007EG8N0M.
- —— (2012). Gerald Giraffe. CreateSpace Independent Publishing. ISBN 978-1479129560.
- ——; Top, Brent L.; Top, Wendy C.; Hansen, Jennie; Allen, N.C.; Blair, Kerry; Hovey, Margot; Klinger, Erin; Robinson, Jodi Marie; Daines, Julie; Hinrichsen, Ronda Gibb (2013). With Wondering Awe. Covenant Communications. ASIN B00F0T9WPK.
- —— (2013). Charly's Diary. Amazon Digital Services, Inc. ASIN B00GPVZO0O.
- —— (2014). Be the Lion. CreateSpace Independent Publishing. ASIN B00RWSU5YE.
- Hannah's Legacy (2017)
