= 1938 North Dakota Fighting Sioux football team =

American college football season

1938 North Dakota Fighting Sioux football
- Conference: North Central Conference
- Record: 6–2 (2–1 NCC)
- Head coach: Charles A. West (10th season)
- Home stadium: Memorial Stadium

1938 North Central Conference football standings
	Conf.					Overall
Team	W		L		T	W		L		T
South Dakota $	5	–	0	–	0	7	–	1	–	0
North Dakota	3	–	1	–	0	6	–	2	–	0
North Dakota Agricultural	3	–	1	–	0	5	–	4	–	0
South Dakota State	2	–	3	–	0	3	–	5	–	0
Morningside	1	–	3	–	1	4	–	3	–	1
Omaha	1	–	3	–	1	2	–	5	–	1
Iowa State Teachers	0	–	4	–	0	3	–	5	–	0
$ – Conference champion

The 1938 North Dakota Fighting Sioux football team, also known as the Nodaks, was an American football team that represented the University of North Dakota in the North Central Conference (NCC) during the 1938 college football season. In its tenth year under head coach Charles A. West, the team compiled a 6–2 record (2–1 against NCC opponents), tied for second place out of seven teams in the NCC, and outscored opponents by a total of 151 to 86. The team opened its season with a victory over the Winnipeg Blue Bombers, a professional football team from Canada.

== Schedule ==
Date	Opponent	Site	Result	Attendance	Source
September 16	at Winnipeg Blue Bombers*	Osborne Stadium; Winnipeg, MB	W 21–7		
September 23	South Dakota State	Memorial Stadium; Grand Forks, ND	W 37–0		
September 30	Morningside	Memorial Stadium; Grand Forks, ND	W 27–12		
October 14	DePaul*	Memorial Stadium; Grand Forks, ND	W 32–12		
October 22	Montana*^{†}	Memorial Stadium; Grand Forks, ND	W 7–0	7,000	
October 29	at North Dakota Agricultural	Dacotah Field; Fargo, ND (Nickel Trophy)	L 13–17	8,000	
November 5	at Detroit*	University of Detroit Stadium; Detroit, MI	L 7–38		
November 11	Omaha	Memorial Stadium; Grand Forks, ND	W 7–0		
*Non-conference game; ^{†}Homecoming

== After the season ==
The following Fighting Sioux was selected in the 1939 NFL draft after the season.

Round	Pick	Player	Position	NFL club
18	164	Charlie Gainor	End	Philadelphia Eagles
