= WCAT (South Dakota) =

Radio station in Rapid City, South Dakota (1922–1952)

WCAT was an AM radio station, licensed to the South Dakota School of Mines and Technology (SDSM&T) in Rapid City, South Dakota, from its 1922 founding until its deletion in 1952. WCAT was the first broadcasting station in the state of South Dakota.

== History ==
Effective December 1, 1921, the Department of Commerce, which regulated United States radio at this time, adopted regulations setting aside two wavelengths for use by broadcasting stations: 360 meters (833 kHz) for "entertainment" programs, and 485 meters (619 kHz) for "market and weather" reports. On May 9, 1922, WCAT's first license, as South Dakota's first broadcasting station, was issued to the South Dakota School of Mines in Rapid City for operation on the market and weather wavelength.

Currently, most stations west of the Mississippi River have call signs beginning with "K". WCAT, however was licensed before the government changed the dividing line between W and K call signs. Prior to the January 1923 establishment of the Mississippi River as the boundary, call letters beginning with "W" were generally assigned to stations east of an irregular line formed by the western state borders from North Dakota south to Texas, with calls beginning with "K" going only to stations in states west of that line. However, existing stations like WCAT were allowed to keep their original call letters.

The station was founded by students from the Electrical Engineering department. Originally, the studios were located in the basement of the Administration building. The WCAT call sign was randomly assigned from a sequential list of available call signs. Reflecting its call letters, the station adopted the slogan "Wildcat of the Hills". Programming, at first featuring weather reports, later ranged from news to sports and music. In 1928, the studios were moved to the third floor of the Prep Building (later used as the school's gymnasium and currently the Music Center).

On November 11, 1928, the Federal Radio Commission made a major reallocation under its General Order 40, which assigned WCAT to 1200 kHz, with a power of 100 watts. In 1936, WCAT was reported to be temporarily off the air, while upgraded studios and transmission facilities were being constructed, with a schedule of "one hour daily except Sunday". In 1941, most stations on 1200 kHz, including WCAT, were moved to 1230 kHz, as part of the implementation of the North American Regional Broadcasting Agreement. Although WCAT qualified for "unlimited" hours of operation, it operated for significantly reduced hours, thus its limited schedule was licensed as a "specified hours" station.

The station encountered significant financial and technical issues, and struggled to stay on the air. This led to the Federal Communications Commission deleting WCAT on October 28, 1952. The local newspaper, reporting WCAT's demise, stated that "The Federal Communications Commission issued an edict. Install new, modern equipment—or get off the air." Unable to fulfill this requirement, "Tired, worn out equipment and a lack of funds have finally silenced the old timer."

In 1971, the school established a new educational FM station, KTEQ-FM.

== See also ==
- List of initial AM-band station grants in the United States
