= KTEQ-FM =

Radio station of the South Dakota School of Mines and Technology

Rapid City, South Dakota; United States
- Broadcast area: Rapid City, South Dakota
- Frequency: 91.3 MHz
- Branding: K-Tech

Programming
- Format: Freeform / Alternative

Ownership
- Owner: South Dakota School of Mines and Technology

History
- First air date: August 7, 1971
- Former frequencies: 88.1 MHz

Technical information
- Facility ID: 172663
- Class: A
- ERP: 500 watts
- HAAT: 17.4 meters
- Transmitter coordinates: 44°05′17.3″N 103°14′56.6″W

Links
- Webcast: Listen Live
- Website: Official website

KTEQ-FM (91.3 FM, "K-Tech") is the campus radio station of the South Dakota School of Mines and Technology (SDSM&T) in Rapid City, South Dakota. The station broadcasts a variety of music formats according to the tastes of the volunteer DJs doing the shows. The only restriction that KTEQ places on the formats of the shows is that the music cannot be Top 40 music. The station was off the air for nearly 13 1/2 years following the loss of its Non-commercial educational broadcast license but returned to air on March 8, 2014. Besides broadcasting over-the-air, the station's programming is also transmitted over channel 6 of the cable television system on the SDSM&T campus and through Internet streaming.

== History ==
KTEQ-FM was the second radio station located at SDSM&T. An earlier AM station, WCAT, had been operated from its founding as South Dakota's first station in 1922. WCAT was deleted in 1952, after it was unable to afford equipment upgrades mandated by the Federal Communications Commission.

Efforts to launch a new SDSM&T campus radio station started in 1969. With the assistance of announcer Greg Carey, student body president Jim McGibbney formed the Tech Educational Radio Council (TERC), the governing body of KTEQ. The first studio of KTEQ was located at Surbeck Center; and, tower space for the transmitter was originally donated by KBHE-FM. Initially, KTEQ-FM broadcast at 88.1 MHz with a power of 10 watts. The first broadcast by KTEQ-FM occurred on August 7, 1971, opening with "Also sprach Zarathustra." The first voice to be heard on KTEQ was that of Gary Brown.

KTEQ-FM first broadcast recorded on a cassette in the Connolly Hall dormitory. "Spotty" quality in places with some dropouts.

US senator and then-US presidential candidate George McGovern gave KTEQ an on-air interview during the 1972 election.

The studios of KTEQ were eventually relocated at the Old Gym building on the SDSM&T campus.

In the early 1980s while still broadcasting at 88.1 MHz, the FCC granted KTEQ permission to increase its radiated power. After the power increase, cable TV subscribers near the broadcast tower complained to their cable provider of KTEQ signal bleeding into their TV programs. Rather than upgrading the shielding of their cable, the cable TV provider chose to grant KTEQ money to change their broadcast frequency so as to not interfere with TV audio signal. In the summer of 1982, KTEQ moved from 88.1 to 91.3 which is farther away from the TV frequency spectrum.

KTEQ radio broadcasts fell silent for a number of months during the mid-1980s. The station finally resumed broadcasts during the spring of 1987. At that time, the station broadcast twenty-four hours per day, seven days per week. Later, the station removed all of the 3AM-to-6AM time slots from its schedule. For many years, the station's tower space was donated by KOTA-TV.

In August 2000, KOTA increased its effective radiated power. As a result, KTEQ had to remove its transmitting hardware from the KOTA tower space, ending KTEQ's radio broadcasts. When KTEQ failed to resume its broadcasts within a year, the station lost its broadcast license in September 2001. New broadcasting hardware was purchased, but the FCC stopped accepting applications for non-commercial broadcast licenses in 2001. While KTEQ waited for the FCC to resume accepting non-commercial license applications, the station continued to transmit its programming over the Internet and over the closed-circuit television on the SDSM&T campus. By 2005, a new studio was located at Surbeck Center.

In May 2011, the campus radio station's long wait finally appeared to be over. On May 3, 2011, SDSM&T was informed by the FCC that the university had beat out four other applicants for a non-profit radio license. The FCC awarded the radio station a construction permit to put up a new transmitter as well as a three-year timeline in which to re-establish the station. The station's management and TERC board hoped to have the station fully up and running on their own tower by the Fall of 2013.

KTEQ encountered many delays, but construction was finally completed in the Spring of 2014. The FCC issued the Station a new Non-Commercial Educational Radio Broadcast License on February 28, 2014. At noon on March 8, KTEQ returned to air, once again opening with "Also Sprach Zarathustra."
