= IKV-3 Kotka =

IKV-3 "Kotka"

General information
- Type: glider
- National origin: Finland
- Manufacturer: IK-Vasama, KK.Lehtovaara oy
- Designer: Tuomo Tervo, Jorma Jalkanen
- Primary user: Ilmailukerho Vasama
- Number built: 1

History
- Manufactured: 1966
- First flight: 1966

The IKV-3 "Kotka" is an FAI Open Class glider that was designed by Tuomo Tervo and Jorma Jalkanen. The prototype first flew in 1966. It was produced initially by IK-Vasama and KK. Lehtovaara.

The name IKV is an acronym for Ilmailukerho Vasama, the Vasama gliding club that sponsored the project.

== Design and development ==
The IKV-3 was designed and the sole example produced between 1964 and 1966.

The wings are built from pine with a birch-plywood skin to 55% from the leading edge. The wing employs a Wortmann FX62-K-152 airfoil at the wing root, a Wortmann FX62-K-153 mid-span and a Wortmann FX60-126 at the wing tip. The ailerons are 3.1m long and are constructed with foam plastic ribs and covered with plywood. The wing also features eight-section dive brakes for glidepath control. The horizontal and vertical stabilizers as well as the flaps are covered with plywood and have foam plastic ribs. The rudder is covered with aircraft fabric.

The fuselage is built from pine, with fibreglass from the nose to behind the wing and plywood aft of there. The landing gear is a retractable monowheel equipped with a drumbrake.

== Specifications (IKV-3) ==
General characteristics

- Crew: one
- Length: 7.74 m (25 ft 5 in)
- Wingspan: 18.00 m (59 ft 1 in)
- Height: 0.75 m (2 ft 6 in)
- Wing area: 17 m^{2} (180 sq ft)
- Aspect ratio: 19:1
- Airfoil: Root: Wortmann FX62-K-152, mid-span: Wortmann FX62-K-153, tip: Wortmann FX60-126
- Empty weight: 273 kg (602 lb)
- Gross weight: 383 kg (844 lb)

Performance

- Maximum speed: 250 km/h (160 mph, 130 kn)
- Maximum glide ratio: 38-40:1
- Rate of sink: 0.53 m/s (104 ft/min)
- Wing loading: 22.53 kg/m^{2} (4.61 lb/sq ft)
