= Susan Skemp =

American mechanical engineer

Susan H. Skemp is a retired American mechanical engineer, the former president of the American Society of Mechanical Engineers, and the former executive director of the Southeast National Marine Renewable Energy Center at Florida Atlantic University.

== Education and career ==
Skemp was born in the base hospital of the Boca Raton Army Air Field in Florida, where her father was a radar instructor. After the air field closed, its land became the campus of Florida Atlantic University, where she would later study and work.

Skemp became a technician at Pratt & Whitney in 1963, and worked there for 31 years, later transitioning to a role as an engineer for them. During this time she earned an associate degree from Palm Beach State College in 1971, and graduated from Florida Atlantic University in 1981 with a bachelor of science in mechanical engineering.

She served as president of the American Society of Mechanical Engineers for the 2002–2003 term, its second female president, and was an ASME White House Federal Fellow in the Office of Science and Technology Policy from 2004 to 2006. In 2008, she returned to Florida Atlantic University as executive director of the Southeast National Marine Renewable Energy Center, studying hydrokinetic and thermal sources of marine energy. She chaired the foundation board of ASME beginning in 2013, and retired in 2015.

== Recognition ==
The ASME gave Skemp their Dedicated Service Award in 1991. She was named an ASME Fellow in 2001. She was named to the Florida Atlantic University Alumni Hall of Fame in 2002. In 2014, she won the marine hydrokinetics category of the Women with Hydro Vision Awards, at the HydroVision International conference in Nashville, Tennessee.
