= South Dakota Mines Hardrockers football =

- First season: 1895; 131 years ago
- Athletic director: Joel Lueken
- Head coach: Charlie Flohr; 5th season, 29–30 (.492)
- Location: Rapid City, South Dakota
- Stadium: O'Harra Stadium (capacity: 4,000)
- Conference: RMAC
- Colors: Navy blue and Vegas gold
- All-time record: 381–493–35 (.438)

Conference championships
- 14
- Fight song: Ramblin' Wreck from Rapid Tech
- Mascot: Grubby the Miner
- Marching band: Hardrocker Pep Band
- Website: www.gorockers.com

The South Dakota Mines Hardrockers football program represents the South Dakota School of Mines and Technology (SDSM&T) in college football. In 2010, South Dakota Mines announced that it would end the school's affiliation with the National Association of Intercollegiate Athletics (NAIA) to join the National Collegiate Athletic Association's Division II beginning with the 2011 season as a probationary member and becoming a full member in 2013.

The Hardrockers also went by the "Longhairs" early in their history. They have played football since 1895 with hiatuses taken in 1896–1899, 1907, 1915, and 1942–1945.

== West River Rivalry-Black Hills Brawl ==
SDSM&T's first ever game was an 18–0 loss to Black Hills College (now Black Hills State University) on Nov. 28, 1895. This would prove to be a long-standing rivalry.

SDSM&T's main athletic rival is Black Hills State University. The rivalry is generated from proximity, with BHSU located less than 50 miles to the west in Spearfish, South Dakota. Educational differences between the schools also help fuel the rivalry, with BHSU being mainly a liberal arts college and SDSM&T an engineering/STEM-only research university. The football rivalry is the fourth most-frequently played series in the US, behind the Harvard–Yale football rivalry (131), Princeton–Yale (138), and The Rivalry (Lafayette–Lehigh) (151 games). It is also the oldest football series west of the Mississippi River and the most played between current NCAA Div. II teams. Generally, the last game of each season is reserved for the two schools to play, however the two schools may play twice in the same season (early in their history have played three times in a season) or earlier in the year. The teams battle for the Homestake Trophy, named for a mine in the Black Hills area and adorned with a prospector's pan. The rivalry is called the Black Hills Brawl, due to the location of the schools and ferocity in which the teams play each other, or the West River Rivalry, named for the area of South Dakota that both school's inhabit.

Since their first meeting in football 1895, the schools have played total of 131 times and to the point of having at least one yearly game since 1919 (excluding the lack of teams from 1942 to 1945 due to World War II). The only years they have not played one game against each other but have had teams are 1902, 1904, 1910, 1911, and 1918. The Hardrockers currently lead the series 65–60–11

== Head coaching history ==
There have been 37 recorded coaches in the school's history.

Coach	Years	Seasons	Games	Wins	Losses	Ties	Percentage
Rudolph F. Flinterman	1895	1	1	0	1	0	0
E. M. Stevens	1900–1902	3	7	5	2	0	.714
Green	1903	1	1	1	0	0	1.000
Carl Hendrickson	1904-1905	2	4	4	0	0	1.000
Thomas R. Nelson	1906	1	3	2	0	1	.666
George S. Keller	1908–1909	2	11	10	1	0	.909
Joseph Power	1910	1	5	2	2	1	.400
Howard Fulweiler	1911	1	6	1	3	2	.167
Guy C. Redfield	1912	1	6	2	4	0	.333
J. H. Winterringer	1913	1	7	5	2	0	.714
Ernest Allmendinger	1914	1	5	4	1	0	.800
John F. Dulebohn	1916	1	5	2	3	0	.400
Fred Gushurst	1917, 1919–1920	3	15	10	5	0	.666
Kenneth M. Harkness	1918	1	1	1	0	0	1.000
John Redmon	1921	1	7	2	4	1	.286
B. R. Schroeder	1922–1923	2	14	9	4	1	.643
Ollie C. Thomas	1924–1928	5	39	23	15	1	.560
Ray D. Hahn	1929–1934	6	42	15	27	0	.357
Lem Herting	1935–1938	4	29	14	14	1	.483
Art Sullivan	1939–1940	2	15	5	9	1	.333
Dave Strong	1941	1	7	4	2	1	.571
Dan Lennon	1946	1	8	2	6	0	.250
Marvin Lewellyn	1947–1951	5	39	19	16	4	.487
Clare Ekeland	1952–1958	7	56	15	32	9	.268
Homer Englund	1959–1960, 1962	3	23	12	11	0	.522
Jerry Welfl	1961	1	8	3	5	0	.375
Darold King	1963–1970	8	66	25	36	5	.379
Gary L. Boner	1971–1989	19	172	92	73	7	.535
Erv Mondt	1990–1994	5	45	11	34	0	.244
Rick Fiala	1995–1997	3	30	7	23	0	.233
Ron Richards	1998–1999	2	20	2	18	0	.100
Darren Soucy	2000–2004	5	50	10	40	0	.200
Dan Kratzer	2005–2011	7	71	23	48	0	.323
Stacy Collins	2012–2015	4	43	16	27	0	.372
Zach Tinker	2016–2019	3	33	13	20	0	.394
Charlie Flohr	2020–Present	6	59	29	30	0	.492
