= Institut für Kunststoffverarbeitung =

Research institute in Aachen, Germany

Coordinates: 50.7788°N 6.0811°E

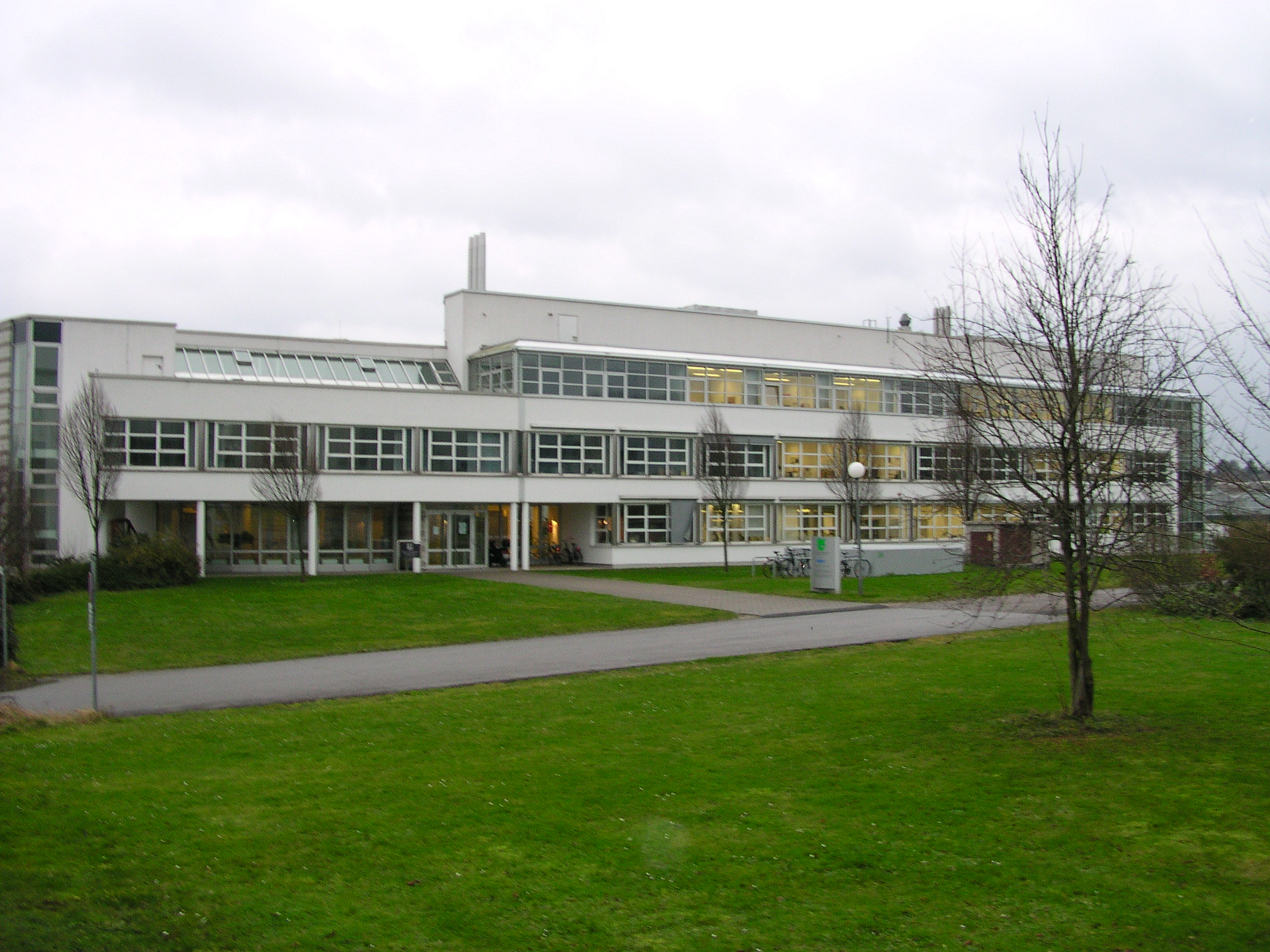
Institut für Kunststoffverarbeitung (Institute for Plastics Processing), Aachen

The Institut für Kunststoffverarbeitung in Industrie und Handwerk (IKV), the Institute for Plastics Processing in Industry and Trade at the Rheinisch-Westfälische Technische Hochschule Aachen, Germany, is a teaching and research institute for the study of plastics technology. It stands for practice-oriented research, innovation and technology transfer. The focus of the IKV is the integrative view of product development in the material, construction and processing sectors, in particular in plastics and rubber. The sponsor is a non-profit association that currently includes around 300 companies from the plastics industry worldwide (as of December 2018) and through which the institute maintains a close connection between industry and science. In addition, the IKV is a member of the Arbeitsgemeinschaft industrieller Forschungsvereinigungen "Otto von Guericke" (AiF).

The institute was founded in 1950 and, with around 350 employees, has become Europe's largest research and training institute in the field of plastics technology. The first head of the institute was Karl Krekeler, followed in 1959 by Alfred Hermann Henning. From 1965 to 1988 Georg Menges headed the institute, followed by Walter Michaeli until his retirement in 2011. Since 2011, the current head of the institute, and at the same time managing director of the association, is Christian Hopmann. He also holds the Chair for Plastics Processing within the Faculty of Mechanical Engineering at RWTH Aachen University.

== Tasks ==
The tasks of the institute are:

- scientific and practice-oriented research in the field of plastics technology
- the training of students to become qualified junior staff for the plastics industry
- the training of practitioners in the craft industry in the field of plastics technology

== Structure ==
The scientific departments injection molding/PUR technology, extrusion and further processing, molded part design/materials engineering and fibre-reinforced plastics are the operative units of the institute. The Zentrum für Kunststoffanalyse und Prüfung (KAP) (English: Center for Plastics Analysis and Testing) at the IKV supports and advises scientific departments and is available as a service for the industry to solve problems. The training and education department is responsible nationwide for technology transfer to the skilled trades sector.

Since 1960, the institute has been cooperating with the Gewerbeförderungsanstalt (GFA, English: commercial development agency) in the training center of the Handwerkskammer Aachen (HWK), which served and was certified as a training center for plastics technology for both the IKV and the Deutscher Verband für Schweißtechnik (DVS) and the Deutscher Verein des Gas- und Wasserfaches (DVGW). On the initiative of the incumbent HWK President Anton Immendorf, this was transferred in 1983 to the Berufsbildungs- und Gewerbeförderungseinrichtung (BGE) in Aachen's Tempelhofer Straße.

Currently, about 130 employees including some 80 scientists are working at the IKV in research, development and training. They are supported by about 220 student assistants. In addition to the tasks mentioned above, one of the goals of the IKV is to provide the industry with solutions to practical problems. Individual projects, but also those within the framework of joint industrial research often lead to high-quality product ideas and developments, which, in the sense of the desired technology transfer, benefit not only larger, but foremost small and medium-sized enterprises.
