= O'Harra Stadium =

Stadium in South Dakota, United States

- Dunham Field
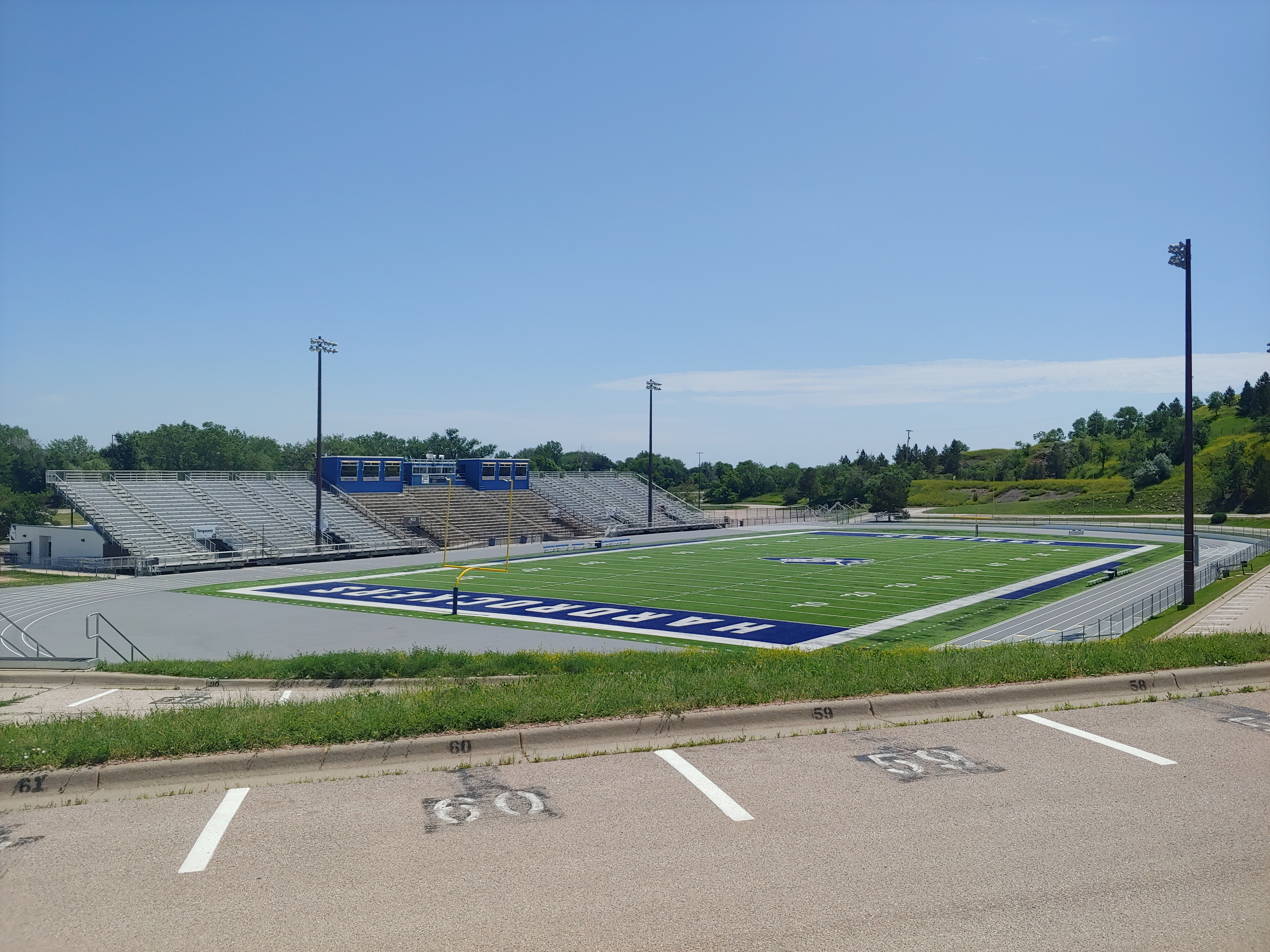

- Location in the United States Location in South Dakota
- Interactive map of O'Harra Stadium
- Address: 501 E. St. Joseph St.
- Location: South Dakota School of Mines & Technology; Rapid City, South Dakota
- Coordinates: 44°04′22″N 103°12′10″W
- Owner: SDSM&T
- Operator: SDSM&T
- Capacity: 4,000 (approx.) (3,500 seats and 250 tailgating spots)
- Surface: Artificial turf
- Record attendance: 5,000 – (Sept. 15, 2015) (vs. Black Hills State)
- Public transit: Rapid Ride

Construction
- Groundbreaking: May 18, 1931
- Opened: September 16, 1938; 87 years ago
- Cost: $132,000 (original structure) ($2.79 million in 2025)
- Architect: Sigma Tau members
- General contractor: Works Progress Administration (WPA)

Tenants
- SDSM&T Hardrockers (NCAA) (1938–present); Stevens HS Raiders (SDHSAA) (1969–present); Central HS Cobblers (SDHSAA) (1978–present)

Dunham Field at O'Harra Memorial Stadium is a multi-purpose college football stadium in the United States, located on the campus of the South Dakota School of Mines & Technology (SDSM&T) in Rapid City, South Dakota. It is the home of the South Dakota Mines Hardrockers of the Rocky Mountain Athletic Conference in NCAA Division II, as well as Rapid City's two public high schools (Central and Stevens).

The stadium is named after SDSM&T's eighth president, Dr. Cleophas C. O'Harra (who decided on the location), and the field is named after two alumni boosters, George & Nancy Dunham.

The stadium has a unique design, consisting of standard bleacher and box seating to one side and a three-tiered terrace on the opposite side, consisting of 250 paved parking spots allowing spectators to tailgate and watch games from their vehicles. A track also encircles the field, allowing its use for track and field events. The artificial turf field has a northwest–southeast alignment at an approximate elevation of 3,180 feet (970 m) above sea level.

== History ==
In 1930, the School of Mines obtained an area southeast of SDSM&T campus that was previous used as a garbage dump and feeding area for swine, based on suggestions from landscape artist Phelps Myman. That year's pledges to Sigma Tau were then tasked with designing the field and stadium. President O’Harra declared a holiday for students on May 18, 1931, allowing the student body to come and level the field en masse, in preparation for proper construction. Work between 1932 until its completion in 1938 was done by a mixture of unskilled workers from the Works Progress Administration (WPA) and skilled laborers paid by donations collected by the school's alumni association.

Work was completed and the stadium dedicated on September 16, 1938, with an 18–7 victory over the South Dakota State Jackrabbits. The Hardrockers finished the season 8–0 (after a forfeit by Yankton College) and won that year's conference championship.

The stadium underwent a $1.75 million expansion and modernization in later years through support by various state, city, county, and school entities. The field was named Dunham Field in 2004. A further $2.5 million in renovations to O'Harra were proposed in September 2016 and slated for the summer of 2017.
