= South Dakota School of Mines and Technology =

Public university in Rapid City, South Dakota, U.S.

South Dakota Mines
- Former names: Dakota School of Mines (1885–1889); South Dakota School of Mines (1889–1943)
- Motto: Advancing the Frontier of Innovation
- Type: Public university
- Established: 1885; 141 years ago
- Academic affiliations: Space-grant
- Endowment: $65.1 million (2019)
- President: Brian Tande
- Faculty: 159
- Students: 2,576 (fall 2024)
- Undergraduates: 2,216 (fall 2024)
- Postgraduates: 360 (fall 2024)
- Location: Rapid City, South Dakota, United States; 44°4′26″N 103°12′22″W
- Campus: 120 acres (49 ha); Urban
- Colors: Blue & Old Gold
- Nickname: Hardrockers
- Sporting affiliations: NCAA Division II — RMAC
- Mascot: Grubby the Miner
- Website: sdsmt.edu
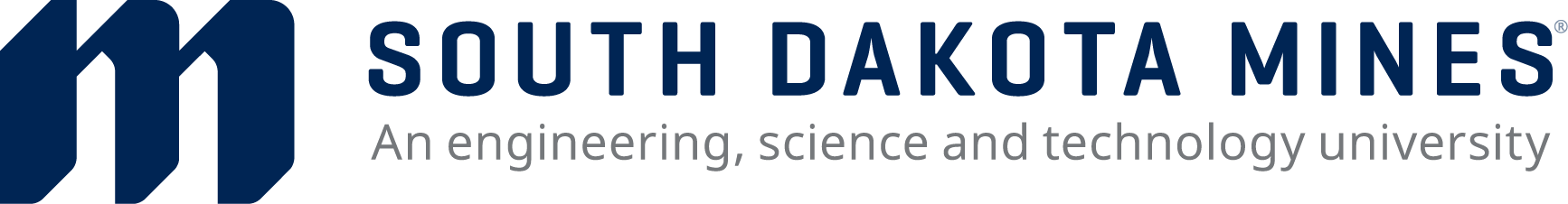

The South Dakota School of Mines & Technology (South Dakota Mines, SD Mines, or SDSM&T) is a public university in Rapid City, South Dakota, United States. It is governed by the South Dakota Board of Regents and was founded in 1885. South Dakota Mines offers bachelor's, master’s, and doctoral degrees.

== History ==
The cornerstone of the first School of Mines (then known as the "Dakota School of Mines") building was dedicated on August 19, 1885, with the first classes being held February 21, 1887. John W. Hancher received the first bachelor of science degree at the first commencement on May 31, 1888. The school became known as the "South Dakota School of Mines" in 1889 after admission of South Dakota as a state to the United States.

The School of Mines presented exhibits during the 1904 World's Fair and the first licensed radio station in the state of South Dakota was established on campus in December 1911, a full decade before WCAT (the precursor the current campus station KTEQ-FM). The first "M-Day" homecoming celebration occurred on October 5, 1912 with the construction of the "M" on M-Hill, the school's mountain monogram. The school's ROTC battalion was formed in 1918 in response to World War I. The football stadium began construction in 1931, and was completed as "O'Harra Field" in 1938.

The school formally became the South Dakota School of Mines & Technology in February 1943.

In September 2012, South Dakota Mines made national news when Bloomberg announced that it had passed Harvard in the category of starting salaries for graduates. On September 19, Tech President Robert A. Wharton died due to complications of cancer treatments. During the presidential search, Duane C. Hrncir was the interim president.

On April 25, 2013, the School of Mines announced that Heather Wilson would become the first female president in the school's 128-year history, starting in June 2013. She resigned in 2017 after being appointed to the office of Secretary of the United States Air Force.

In October 2017, the School of Mines announced that the next president would be James (Jim) Rankin, Ph.D. He retired in 2024.

== Academics ==
South Dakota Mines offers degrees in 20 engineering and science fields, as well as 18 master's degree programs and 9 Doctorate programs. Its most popular undergraduate majors, based on 2021 graduates, were:

- Mechanical Engineering (64)
- Computer and Information Sciences (47)
- Civil Engineering (47)
- Industrial Engineering (41)
- Chemical Engineering (31)
- Electrical and Electronics Engineering (23)

The South Dakota Mines placement rate for graduates with a bachelor’s degree is 98 percent, with an average starting salary of more than $72,000.

== Campus ==
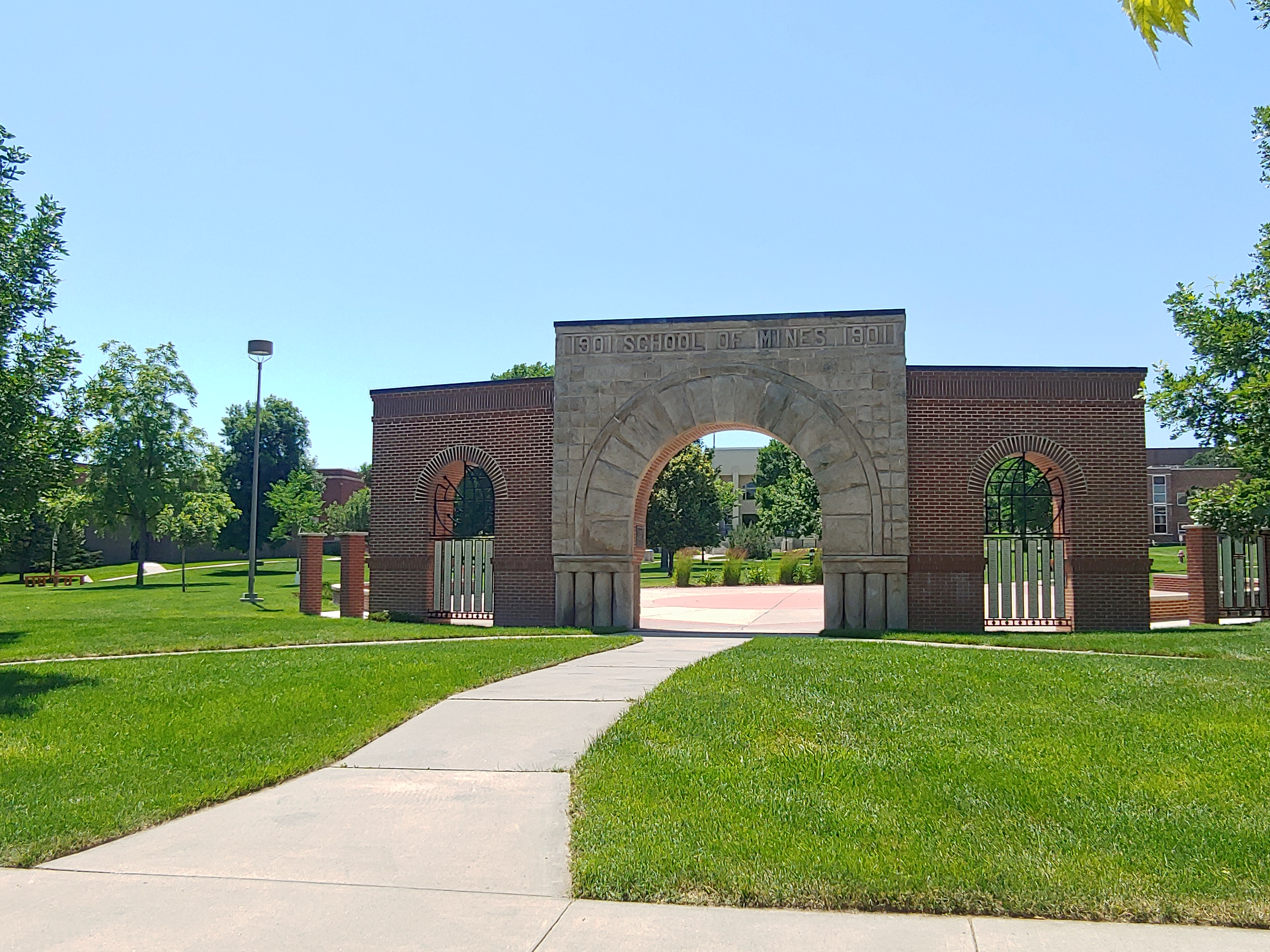
Archway at the center of campus

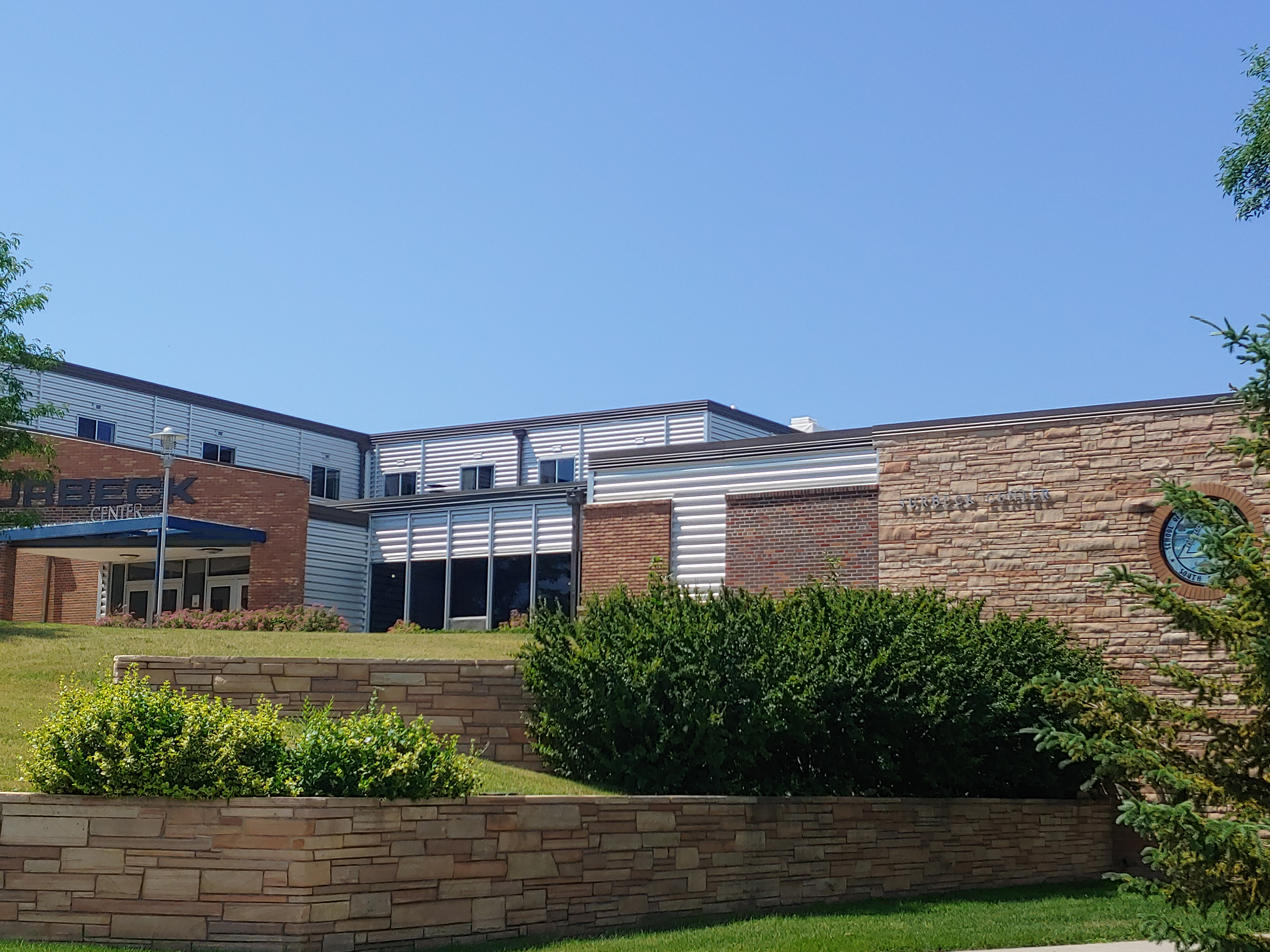
The Surbeck Center, SDSM&T student union

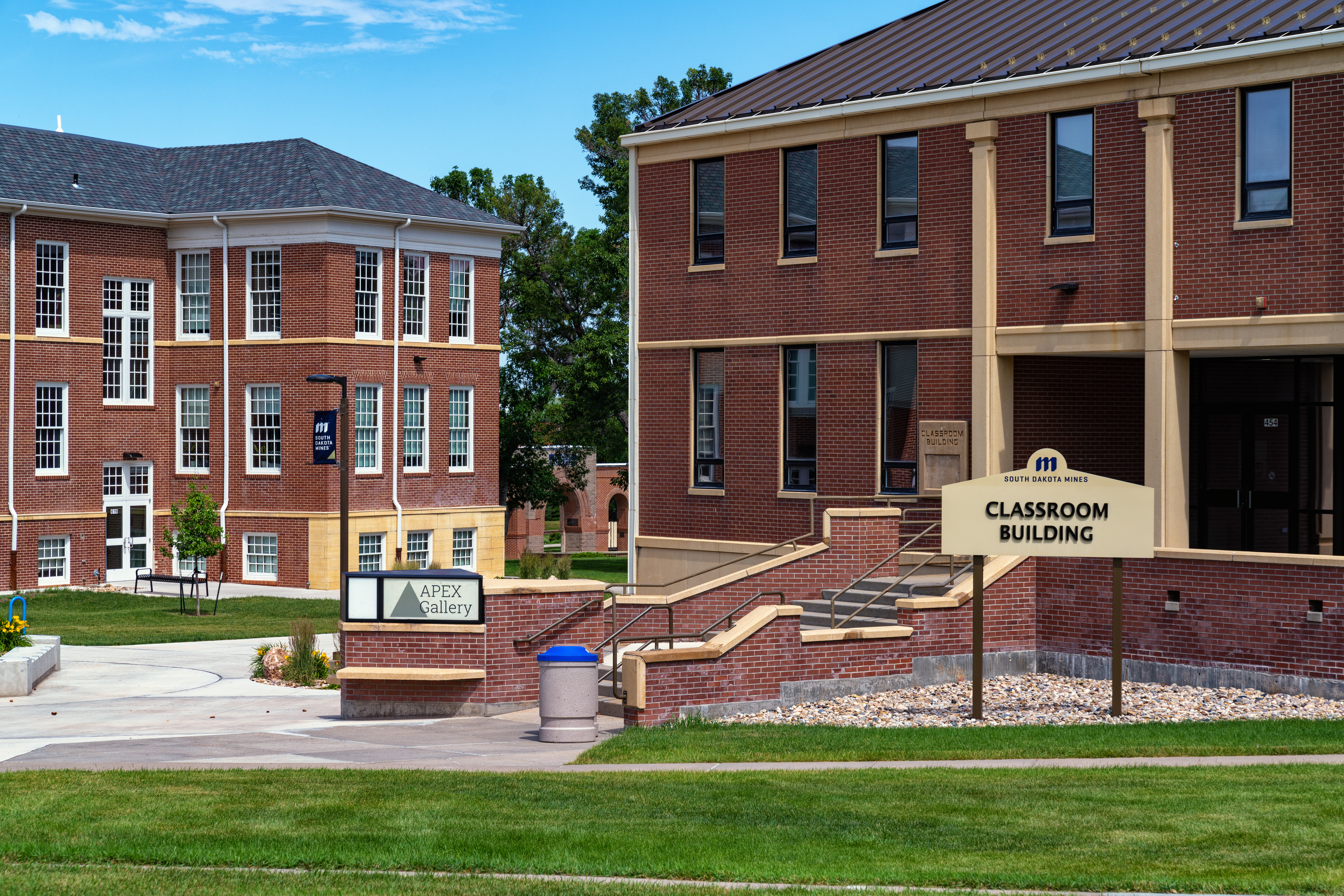
Classroom Building, which contains the APEX art gallery

The campus is located in the center of Rapid City, on the northern slope of small foothills of the Black Hills.

The APEX Gallery is located in Classroom Building 211, and hosts a new exhibit every four to six weeks. The gallery hosts contemporary works of artists and scientists, many of whom are nationally and internationally recognized.

=== Museum of Geology ===
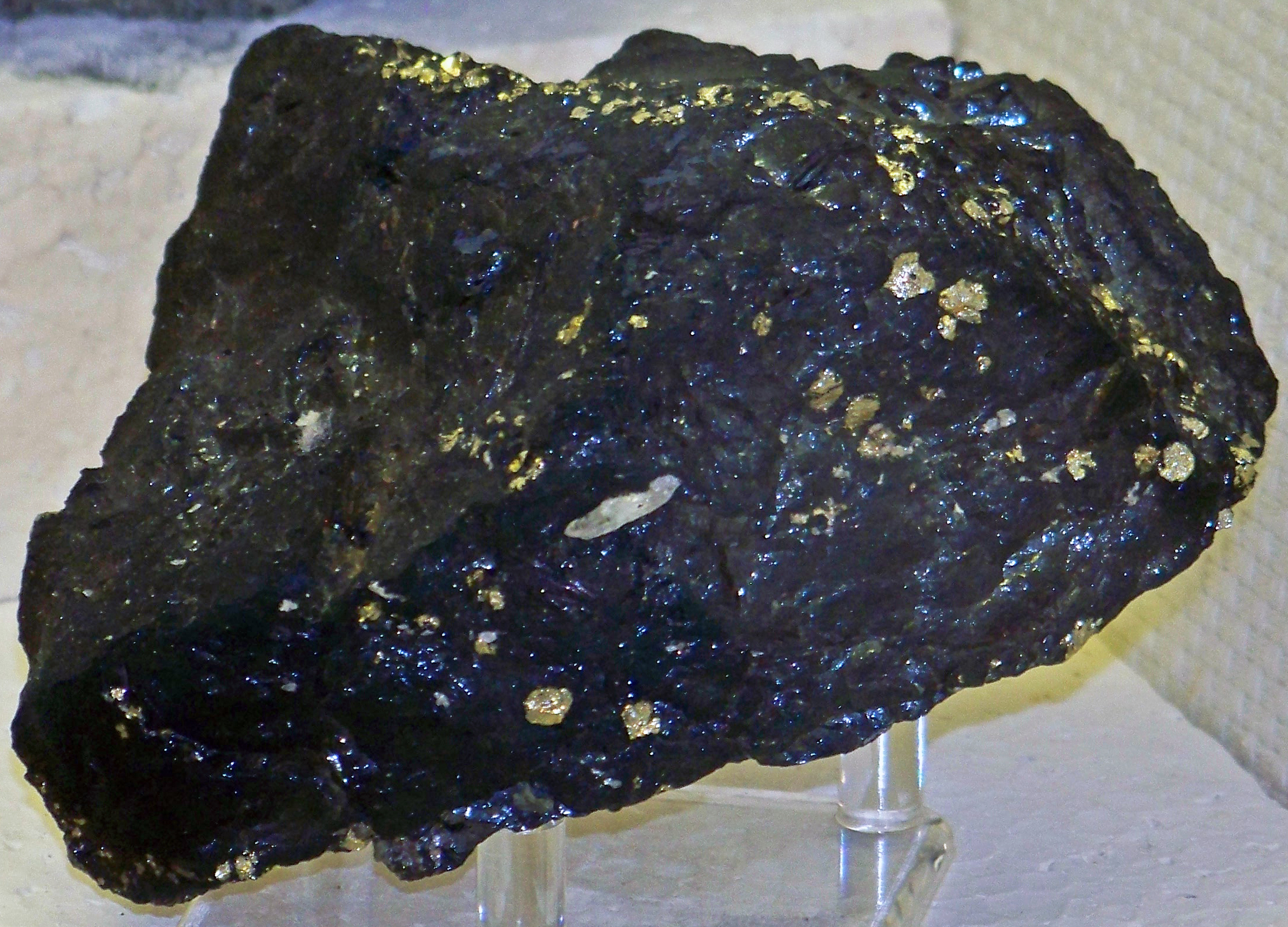
Digenite-pyrite ore sample, Butte Mining District, Montana. On display at the Museum, 2010

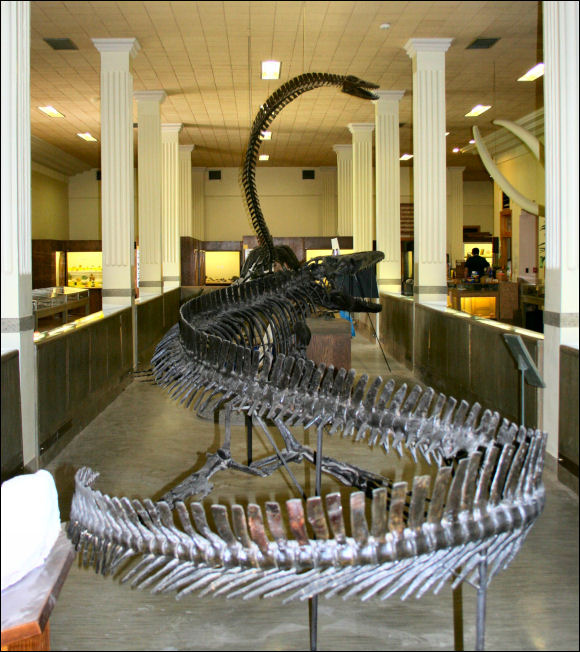
Geology Museum, SDSMT

Opening the same year as the school, the "Museum of Geology" collects, conserves, curates, interprets, and exhibits paleontologically, mineralogically, and geologically significant objects and serves as the repository for such objects from South Dakota and the Northern Great Plains. The public exhibits of the museum have been housed since 1944 in the second floor of the then newly completed O'Harra Building, while the preparation laboratories and collections are held in the James E. Martin Paleontology Center, constructed in 2009.

== Student life ==
Undergraduate demographics as of Fall 2023
Race and ethnicity	Total
White	83%
Hispanic	6%
Unknown	4%
Asian	2%
Two or more races	2%
American Indian/Alaska Native	1%
Black	1%
International student	1%
Economic diversity
Low-income (Note: The percentage of students who received an income-based federal Pell grant intended for low-income students.)	17%
Affluent (Note: The percentage of students who are a part of the American middle class at the bare minimum.)	83%

=== Student organizations ===
Active fraternities on campus include Alpha Chi Sigma, Delta Sigma Phi, Lambda Chi Alpha, Chi Psi, Phi Kappa Tau, and Triangle. Sororities include Alpha Delta Pi and Beta Delta Mu. Student government organizations include the Student Association Senate.

Student media organizations include KTEQ-FM (the campus radio station) and "the Aurum" (the campus newspaper, formerly known as "the Tech" and then "the Raver"). "The Aurum" is the original name of the school newspaper, first published in November 1901. The newspaper changed its name back to "The Aurum" in January 2010. The campus radio station, KTEQ, was started in 1922 as a low-powered AM station, left the air in 1955, and returned as the FM-station KTEQ in 1971 and airs a freeform programming format.

Amplify College Ministries, Fellowship of Christian Athletes, InterVarsity Christian Fellowship, Lutheran Campus Ministry, the Newman Center, and United Campus Ministries are some of the many Christian and religious groups operating on campus. Service organizations on campus include Circle K and Gamers for Service.

== Athletics ==
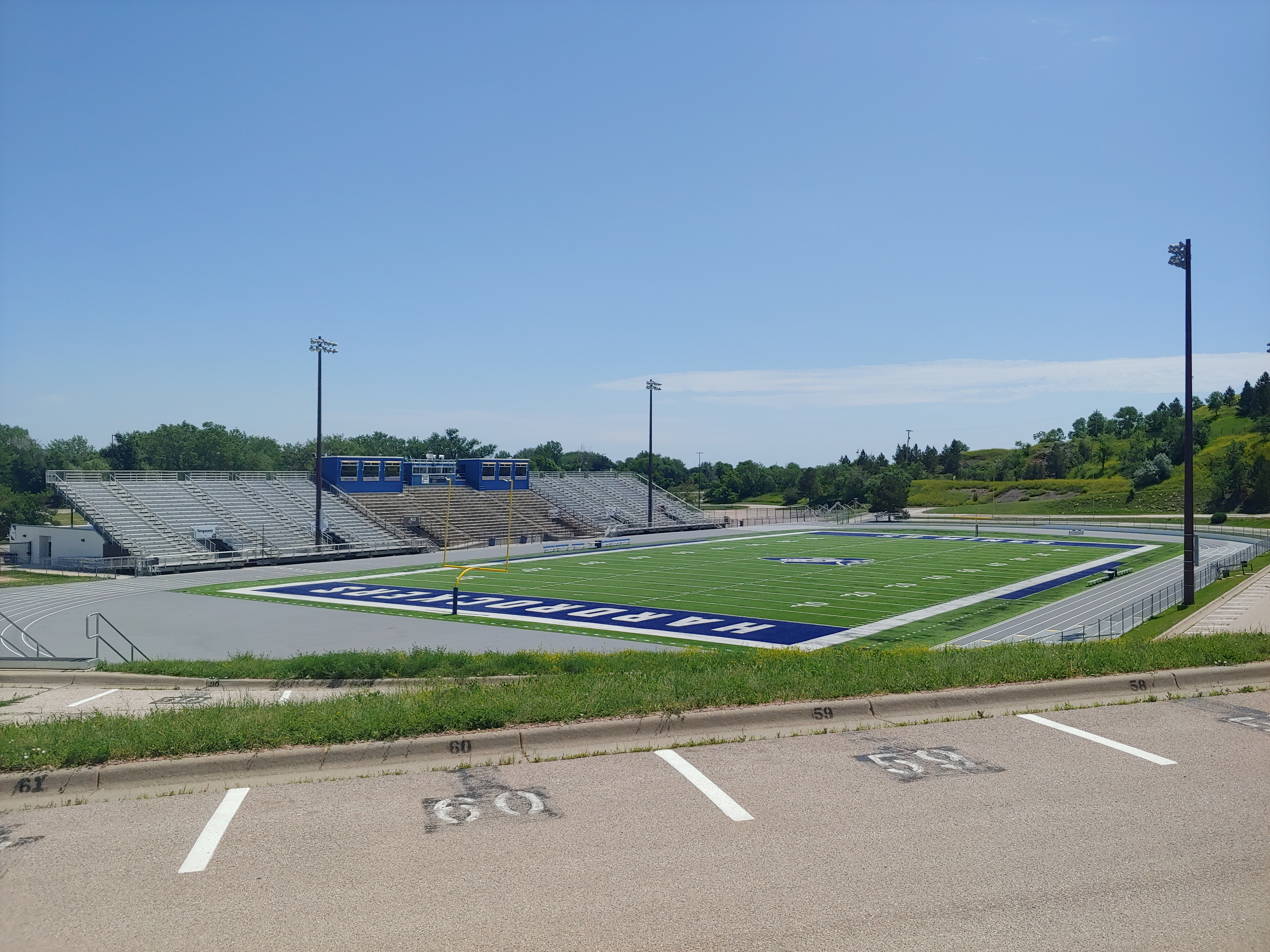
South Dakota Mines' football stadium, O'Harra Stadium

South Dakota Mines athletic teams are called the "Hardrockers", coming from its mining background. The history of the athletic programs stretch back to 1895 when the first school football team formed, originally named the "Longhairs". The school host a variety of college sports which include: football, basketball, volleyball, track, cross country, golf, and men's soccer. The athletic mascot name is Grubby the Miner. The school is a member of the National Collegiate Athletic Association (NCAA) and competes at the Division II level. The school joined the Division II Rocky Mountain Athletic Conference in January 2014 for the majority of its sports (effective beginning the 2014–15 school year), except for men's soccer which joined the Great Northwest Athletic Conference (GNAC) for men's soccer in 2013 and football beginning in 2014.

The Hardrockers formerly competed as members of the Dakota Athletic Conference (DAC) of the National Association of Intercollegiate Athletics (NAIA) from 2000–01 to 2010–11, and were former members of the South Dakota Intercollegiate Conference (SDIC) (also from the NAIA) until after the 1999–2000 school year. South Dakota Mines completed the transition from the NAIA to the NCAA in July 2013.

== Notable staff ==
Prior to 1897, the head of SDSM&T held the title of Dean rather than President. Earl D. Dake served as acting president from 1947–1948 and 1953–1954. Duane C. Hrncir served as acting president from 2012–2013 following the death of Robert A. Wharton.

=== Deans ===
1. Franklin R. Carpenter (1886–1889)
2. George F. Duck (1889–1890)
3. Samuel Cushman (1890–1891)
4. William P. Headden (1891–1893)
5. Walter P. Jenney (1893)
6. Valentine T. McGillycuddy (1893–1897)

=== Presidents ===
1. Robert L. Slagle (1898–1905)
2. Charles H. Fulton (1905–1911)
3. Cleophas C. O'Harra (1911–1935)
4. Joseph P. Connolly (1935–1947)
5. Warren E. Wilson (1948–1953)
6. Fay L. Partlo (1954–1966)
7. Harvey R. Fraser (1966–1975)
8. Richard A. Schleusener (1975–1987)
9. Richard J. Gowen (1987–2003)
10. Charles P. Ruch (2003–2008)
11. Robert A. Wharton (2008–2012)
12. Heather A. Wilson (2013–2017)
13. James M. Rankin (2017–2024)
14. Brian Tande (2025–present)

=== Other notable staff ===
- Ernest Allmendinger, football head coach (1914)
- William Arbegast, director of the Advanced Materials Processing and Joining Center (2001–2009)
- Philip R. Bjork, geology and paleontology professor (1975–2000)
- William Phipps Blake, accepted and then turned down position as the first dean - donated books started school library
- Gary Boner, longest-serving (1971–1989) and winningest football head coach at SDSM&T
- Josh Boyer, football defensive coordinator (2005) now NFL coach
- Wendell E. Dunn, Jr., adjunct professor of metallurgy (?–2007)
- Ray D. Hahn, men's basketball head coach (1930–1935) and football head coach (1929–1934)
- Dan Kratzer, football head coach (2005–2011)
- Erv Mondt, football head coach (1990–1994)
- Walter A. Rosenblith, physics professor (1943–1947)
- Dave Strong, football head coach (1941) and men's basketball head coach (1941–1942)
- Jack Weyland, author and physics professor (?–1971)

== Notable alumni ==
- James Abourezk, former U.S. Representative and U.S. Senator from South Dakota; the first Arab-American to serve in the U.S. Senate
- Dianne Dorland, first female president of the American Institute of Chemical Engineers
- Stan Ellis, member of the California State Assembly representing California's 32nd State Assembly district since 2025
- Marty Jackley, 30th and 33rd Attorney General of South Dakota.
- Zay Jeffries, engineer and recipient of the 1946 John Fritz Medal
- Tony Jensen, president and CEO of Royal Gold
- Kurt Kost, president, Alpha Natural Resources; past president of Society of Mining Engineers
- Al Kurtenbach, founder of Daktronics
- Peter Larson, paleontologist, fossil dealer, and founder of the Black Hills Institute of Geological Research
- Walter Dale Miller, 34th Lieutenant Governor of South Dakota and 29th Governor of South Dakota
- George Philip Jr., Cmdr., posthumous winner of the Navy Cross for actions as commander of USS Twiggs (DD-591) and namesake of USS George Philip (FFG-12)
- Tim Osswald, professor of mechanical engineering at University of Wisconsin–Madison
- Dean M. Peterson, inventor of the Kodak Instamatic camera and the "point-and-shoot" camera
- Marcus R. Ross, paleontologist, young Earth creationist, and professor of geology at Liberty University
- Ajmal Shams, president of the Afghan Social Democratic Party
- Jim Shaw, former mayor of Rapid City, South Dakota
- Anne-Grete Strøm-Erichsen, former Norwegian Minister of Defence and Minister of Health and Care Services; former mayor of Bergen
- Jakeb Sullivan, professional football quarterback
- Gary R. Veurink, vice president manufacturing and engineering of Dow Chemical Company; executive vice president and chief operating officer International Justice Mission
- James Zimmerman, physicist, National Institute of Standards and Technology
