= Dakota State Trojans football, 2020–present =

American college football seasons

The Dakota State Trojans football program from 2020 to present represented Dakota State University in college football during the 2020s. The Trojans compete at the National Association of Intercollegiate Athletics (NAIA) level, and were members of the North Star Athletic Association (NSAA) though the 2024 season. Dakota State will compete as a member of the Frontier Conference beginning in 2025. Josh Anderson, who has served as Dakota State's head coach since 2009, has led the team for the entire decade to date. Dakota State played home games at Trojan Field in Madison, South Dakota through the 2022 season. The Trojans hosted games Dan Beacom Track Complex in 2023 before moving to the Brian Kern Family Stadium in 2024.

== 2020 ==
2020 Dakota State Trojans football
- Conference: North Star Athletic Association
- Record: 4–5 (4–5 NSAA)
- Head coach: Josh Anderson (12th season)
- Offensive coordinator: Alex Kretzschmar (1st season)
- Defensive coordinator: Anvil Sinsabaugh (2nd season)
- Home stadium: Trojan Field

2020 North Star Athletic Association football standings
	Conf.			Overall
Team	W		L	W		L
No. 11 Dickinson State $^	9	–	0	9	–	1
Valley City State	5	–	2	5	–	2
Waldorf	6	–	3	6	–	3
Dakota State	4	–	5	4	–	5
Mayville State	1	–	6	2	–	7
Presentation	0	–	9	0	–	10
$ – Conference champion; ^ – NAIA playoff participant; Rankings from NAIA Coaches' Poll

The 2020 Dakota State Trojans football team represented Dakota State University as a member of the North Star Athletic Association during the 2020–21 NAIA football season. Led by 12th-year head coach Josh Anderson, the Trojans compiled an overall record of 4–5 with all games played again conference opponents, placing fourth in the NSAA.

=== Schedule ===
Date	Time	Opponent	Site	Result
September 12	2:00 p.m.	Dickinson State	Trojan Field; Madison, SD	L 14–26
September 19	7:00 p.m.	at Presentation	Swisher Field; Aberdeen, SD	W 42–0
October 3	4:00 p.m.	Waldorf^{†}	Trojan Field; Madison, SD	L 14–20
October 10	2:00 p.m.	at Dickinson State	Henry Biesiot Activities Center; Dickinson, ND	L 3–23
October 17	3:00 p.m.	Presentation	Trojan Field; Madison, SD	W 21–18
November 7	2:00 p.m.	at Waldorf	Bolstorff Field; Forest City, IA	L 16–17
November 14	1:00 p.m.	Valley City State	Trojan Field; Madison, SD	L 6–14
November 19	5:00 p.m.	at Mayville State	Jerome Berg Field; Mayville, ND	W 37–28
April 24	2:00 p.m.	Mayville State	Trojan Field; Mayville, ND	W 26–7
^{†}Homecoming; All times are in Central time

== 2021 ==
2021 Dakota State Trojans football
- Conference: North Star Athletic Association
- Record: 6–4 (5–3 NSAA)
- Head coach: Josh Anderson (13th season)
- Offensive coordinator: Andrew Loudenback (1st season)
- Defensive coordinator: Anvil Sinsabaugh (3rd season)
- Home stadium: Trojan Field

2021 North Star Athletic Association football standings
	Conf.			Overall
Team	W		L	W		L
No. 15 Dickinson State $^	8	–	0	8	–	3
Valley City State	6	–	2	8	–	2
Waldorf	5	–	3	7	–	3
Dakota State	5	–	3	6	–	4
Mayville State	2	–	6	2	–	9
Iowa Wesleyan	1	–	6	2	–	9
Presentation	0	–	8	0	–	11
$ – Conference champion; ^ – NAIA playoff participant; Rankings from NAIA Coaches' Poll

The 2021 Dakota State Trojans football team represented Dakota State University as a member of the North Star Athletic Association during the 2021 NAIA football season. Led by 13th-year head coach Josh Anderson, the Trojans compiled an overall record of 6–4 with a mark of 5–3 in conference play, tying for third in the NSAA.

=== Schedule ===
Date	Time	Opponent	Site	Result
August 28	7:05 p.m.	at Dakota Wesleyan*	Joe Quintal Field; Mitchell, SD (Chamber of Commerce Traveling Cup)	W 6–0
September 4	4:00 p.m.	Wisconsin–La Crosse*	Trojan Field; Madison, SD	L 21–42
September 18	4:00 p.m.	Presentation	Trojan Field; Madison, SD	W 40–13
September 25	4:00 p.m.	Mayville State^{†}	Trojan Field; Madison, SD	W 20–16
October 2	2:00 p.m.	at Waldorf	Bolstorff Field; Forest City, IA	L 21–26
October 9	2:00 p.m.	at Dickinson State	Henry Biesiot Activities Center; Dickinson, ND	L 14–34
October 16	4:00 p.m.	No. 15 Valley City State	Trojan Field; Madison, SD	W 24–10
October 23	1:00 p.m.	Iowa Wesleyan	Trojan Field; Madison, SD	W 53–15
November 6	2:00 p.m.	at Valley City State	Lokken Stadium; Valley City, ND	L 7–33
November 13	1:00 p.m.	at Presentation	Swisher Field; Aberdeen, SD	W 16–14
*Non-conference game; ^{†}Homecoming; Rankings from NAIA Poll released prior to the game; All times are in Central time

== 2022 ==
2022 Dakota State Trojans football
- Conference: North Star Athletic Association
- Record: 6–4 (4–2 NSAA)
- Head coach: Josh Anderson (14th season)
- Offensive coordinator: Andy Yost (1st season)
- Defensive coordinator: Anvil Sinsabaugh (4th season)
- Home stadium: Trojan Field

2022 North Star Athletic Association football standings
	Conf.			Overall
Team	W		L	W		L
No. 17 Dickinson State $^	6	–	0	8	–	3
Dakota State	4	–	2	6	–	4
Valley City State	4	–	2	5	–	5
Waldorf	3	–	3	7	–	4
Iowa Wesleyan	2	–	4	4	–	7
Presentation	2	–	4	3	–	8
Mayville State	0	–	6	3	–	8
$ – Conference champion; ^ – NAIA playoff participant; Rankings from NAIA Coaches' Poll

The 2022 Dakota State Trojans football team represented Dakota State University as a member of the North Star Athletic Association during the 2022 NAIA football season. Led by 14th-year head coach Josh Anderson, the Trojans compiled an overall record of 6–4 with a mark of 4–2 in conference play, tying for second place in the NSAA.

=== Schedule ===
Date	Time	Opponent	Site	Result	Attendance
August 25	7:05 p.m.	Dakota Wesleyan*	Trojan Field; Madison, SD (Chamber of Commerce Traveling Cup)	W 29–19	
September 3	4:00 p.m.	at No. 12 Wisconsin–La Crosse*	Veterans Memorial Stadium; La Crosse, WI	L 7–42	3,365
September 17	4:00 p.m.	at Waldorf*	Bolstorff Field; Forest City, IA	L 17–42	
September 24	4:00 p.m.	Iowa Wesleyan*^{†}	Trojan Field; Madison, SD	W 24–7	
October 1	1:00 p.m.	Dickinson State	Trojan Field; Madison, SD	L 7–27	
October 8	4:00 p.m.	at Valley City State	Lokken Stadium; Valley City, ND	W 31–17	700
October 15	4:00 p.m.	Presentation	Trojan Field; Madison, SD	L 19–21	
October 22	5:00 p.m.	Mayville State	Jerome Berg Stadium; Mayville, ND	W 38–24	
October 29	1:00 p.m.	at Iowa Wesleyan	Mapleleaf Stadium; Mount Pleasant, IA	W 12–6	165
November 12	4:00 p.m.	Waldorf	Trojan Field; Madison, SD	W 13–0	
*Non-conference game; ^{†}Homecoming; Rankings from NAIA Poll released prior to the game; All times are in Central time

== 2023 ==
2023 Dakota State Trojans football
- Conference: North Star Athletic Association
- Record: 1–9 (1–7 NSAA)
- Head coach: Josh Anderson (15th season)
- Offensive coordinator: Andy Yost (2nd season)
- Defensive coordinator: Anvil Sinsabaugh (5th season)
- Home stadium: Dan Beacom Track Complex

2023 North Star Athletic Association football standings
	Conf.			Overall
Team	W		L	W		L
No. 16 Dickinson State $^	8	–	0	10	–	2
Waldorf	4	–	4	5	–	5
Mayville State	3	–	5	4	–	7
Valley City State*	3	–	5	3	–	7
Dakota State	2	–	6	2	–	8
$ – Conference champion; ^ – NAIA playoff participant * Valley City State forfeited four games due to use of an ineligible player; Rankings from NAIA Coaches' Poll

The 2023 Dakota State Trojans football team represented Dakota State University as a member of the North Star Athletic Association during the 2023 NAIA football season. Led by 15th-year head coach Josh Anderson, the Trojans compiled an overall record of 1–9 with a mark of 1–7 in conference play, placing last out of five teams in the NSAA. The 2023 season was the first and only season in which the Trojans played home games at the Dan Beacom Track Complex in Madison, South Dakota.

=== Schedule ===
Date	Time	Opponent	Site	Result
August 26	7:00 p.m.	at Dakota Wesleyan*	Joe Quintal Field; Mitchell, SD (Chamber of Commerce Traveling Cup)	L 13–23
August 31	7:05 p.m.	Wisconsin–La Crosse*	Dan Beacom Track Complex; Madison, SD	L 6–31
September 9	4:00 p.m.	at Waldorf	Bolstorff Field; Forest City, IA	L 20–35
September 16	4:00 p.m.	Valley City State^{†}	Dan Beacom Track Complex; Madison, SD	L 6–14
September 30	3:00 p.m.	at Mayville State	Jerome Berg Field; Mayville, ND	L 0–13
October 7	2:00 p.m.	at No. 22 Dickinson State	Henry Biesiot Activities Center; Dickinson, ND	L 14–40
October 14	4:00 p.m.	Waldorf	Dan Beacom Track Complex; Madison, SD	L 14–34
October 21	4:00 p.m.	Valley City State	Lokken Stadium; Valley City, ND	L 14–21
November 4	3:00 p.m.	Mayville State	Dan Beacom Track Complex; Madison, SD	W 19–14
November 11	12:00 p.m.	No. 20 Dickinson State	Dan Beacom Track Complex; Madison, SD	L 0–52
*Non-conference game; ^{†}Homecoming; Rankings from NAIA Poll released prior to the game; All times are in Central time

== 2024 ==
2024 Dakota State Trojans football
- Conference: North Star Athletic Association
- Record: 6–4 (4–4 NSAA)
- Head coach: Josh Anderson (16th season)
- Offensive coordinator: Logan Levy (1st season)
- Defensive coordinator: Anvil Sinsabaugh (6th season)
- Home stadium: Brian Kern Family Stadium

2024 North Star Athletic Association football standings
	Conf.			Overall
Team	W		L	W		L
No. 14 Dickinson State $^	8	–	0	10	–	1
Dakota State	4	–	4	6	–	4
Mayville State	3	–	5	4	–	6
Jamestown	3	–	5	3	–	7
Valley City State	2	–	6	3	–	7
$ – Conference champion; ^ – NAIA playoff participant; Rankings from NAIA Coaches' Poll

The 2024 Dakota State Trojans football team represented Dakota State University as a member of the North Star Athletic Association during the 2024 NAIA football season. Led by 16th-year head coach Josh Anderson, the Trojans compiled an overall record of 6–4 with a mark of 4–4 in conference play, placing second in the NSAA.

Dakota State played home game at the newly opened Brian Kern Family Stadium in Madison, South Dakota. The Trojans played their first game in the new stadium on August 29, against Dakota Wesleyan, winning by a score of 34–3. To celebrate the opening of Brian Kern Family Stadium and the Beacom PREMIER Complex, Dakota State University held an event named Trojan Nights inside Brian Kern Family Stadium. This event included musical acts from Old Dominion, Brothers Osborne, and Elle King.

=== Schedule ===
Date	Time	Opponent	Site	TV	Result	Attendance
August 29	7:05 p.m.	Dakota Wesleyan*	Brian Kern Family Stadium; Madison, SD (Chamber of Commerce Traveling Cup)	YouTube	W 34–3	
September 7	7:00 p.m.	at Nebraska Wesleyan*	Abel Stadium; Lincoln, NE	Team 1 Sports	W 41–25	350
September 14	4:00 p.m.	Jamestown^{†}	Brian Kern Family Stadium; Madison, SD	YouTube	W 16–6	2,202
September 21	4:00 p.m.	at Valley City State	Lokken Stadium; Valley City, ND	YouTube	W 19–8	450
October 5	4:00 p.m.	Mayville State	Brian Kern Family Stadium; Madison, SD	YouTube	L 12–13	
October 12	12:00 p.m.	No. 21 Dickinson State	Brian Kern Family Stadium; Madison, SD	YouTube	L 21–38	550
October 19	4:00 p.m.	at Jamestown	Hansen Stadium; Jamestown, ND	YouTube	L 13–21	
October 26	4:00 p.m.	Valley City State	Brian Kern Family Stadium; Madison, SD	YouTube	W 13–6	600
November 9	4:00 p.m.	at Mayville State	Jerome Berg Field; Mayville, ND	YouTube	W 7–0	
November 16	1:00 p.m.	at No. 15 Dickinson State	Henry Biesiot Activities Center; Dickinson, ND	YouTube	L 7–38	
*Non-conference game; ^{†}Homecoming; Rankings from NAIA Poll released prior to the game; All times are in Central time

=== Preseason ===
==== NSAA preseason poll ====
	NSAA Preseason	
1.	Dickinson State	25 (5)
2.	Valley City State	19
3.	Jamestown	15
4.	Mayville State	8
5.	Dakota State	7

=== Personnel ===
==== Roster ====
2024 Dakota State Trojans Football
Quarterbacks: 9 – Tray Hettick – Sophomore (6'3, 205); 18 – AJ Donovan – Freshman (6'2, 185); 12 – Joseph Cole – Sophomore (6'4, 185); 14 – Tell Murray – Freshman (6'1, 170); Running backs: 0 – Tyce Ortman (C) – Senior (5'11, 195); 3 – Preston Iverson – Sophomore (5'6, 165); 32 – Matthew Birkland – Freshman (5'9, 170); 46 – Anthony Moser – Freshman (5'6, 185); 13 – Niyongabo Yohana – Freshman (5'8, 170); 15 – Xander Sheehan – Sophomore (5'11 180); 25 – Reggie Cavanaugh – Freshman (5'8, 170; 28 – Dacian Muldrew – Freshman (5'8, 150); 29 – Colin Iverson – Freshman (5'5, 185); Wide receivers: 6 – Melek Ford – Junior (6'4, 170); 11 – JerQon Conners – Senior (5'11, 180); 5 – Austin Lake – Senior (6'0, 190); 2 – Noah McCant – Sophomore (5'8, 175); 4 – Maddox Kihne – Sophomore (5'10, 170); 15 – Tysen Grinde – Freshman (6'3, 185); 1 – Jovi Wolf – Freshman (5'10, 175); 88 – Jasper Gibson – Sophomore (6'5, 230); 10 – Dylan Langerock – Freshman (6'3, 200); 85 – Grant VanDenHul – Freshman (6'6, 170); 16 – Caden Langenfeld – Freshman (5'10, 160); 86 – Jacob MacDonell – Junior (5'10, 175); 80 – Timothy Halbur – Freshman (6'1, 190); 89 – Amari Dirks – Freshman (6'0, 190); 81 – Payton Anderson – Freshman (6'1, 185); 82 – Levi Miller – Freshman (5'9 165); 83 – Pierce Gomarko – Freshman (6'0 175); Tight ends: 8 – Owen Heath – Sophomore (6'2, 230); 84 – Nathan Cook – Senior (6'2, 225); 17 – Gus Sanford – Junior (6'0, 195); 42 – Eddie Merrell III – Freshman (6'3, 265); 87 – AJ Siemsen – Freshman (6'2, 200); 43 – Camdyn Stoterau – Freshman (6'2, 180); 41 – Kaden Van Egdom – Freshman (6'3, 215)	Kicker/Punter: 37 – Carson Sauseda – Junior (5'10, 200); 36 – Joshua Smith – Junior (5'11, 170); 35 – Thomas Mechels – Freshman (6'2, 220); Long snappers: 98 – Braxton Lacher – Senior (6'0, 230); Offensive linemen: 75 – Tyler Kjetland (C) – Junior (6'5, 305); 68 – Sam Sather – Junior (6'3, 300); 51 – Joseph Taylor – Senior (6'1, 285); 78 – Uziel Ruiz – Sophomore (6'4, 330); 65 – Joshua Shaffer – Junior (6'2, 275); 58 – Jack O'Neil – Junior (6'0, 290); 74 – Brandon Kjetland – Freshman (6'5, 310); 55 – Kendall Cauley – Freshman (6'2, 265); 73 – Thomas Lett – Junior (6'6, 305); 71 – Seth Gawerecki – Sophomore (5'11, 220); 54 – Derek Moreno – Freshman (6'1, 270); 61 – Kasey Gerhard – Freshman (6'0, 260); 50 – Zane Tucker – Sophomore (6'1, 280); 64 – Ethan Crouch – Freshman (6'4, 280); 72 – Ashton Engen – Freshman (6'4, 260); Defensive linemen: 77 – Brooks Jansen – Junior (6'3, 260); 99 – Kacey Cauley – Sophomore (6'1, 250); 92 – Jack Hemmen – Sophomore (6'2, 280); 69 – Joey Hoeschen – Senior (5'11, 260); 90 – Caleb Dwyer – Junior (6'3, 240); 7 – Jordan Cooper – Freshman (6'3, 215); 76 – Brandon Jansen – Junior (6'3, 225); 97 – Rashad Debose – Freshman (5'8, 240); 79 – Griffin Reiner – Freshman (6'1, 295); 91 – William Katchmark – Junior (5'11, 250); 95 – Elliot Devries – Freshman (6'0, 255); 96 – Lamarcus Osborne – Freshman (5'9, 280); 51 – Allen Reed – Sophomore (6'0, 255); 94 – Jacob Imdieke – Freshman (6'3, 270); 93 – Robert Begalka – Freshman (6'0, 260); 66 – Bonnard Bosler – Freshman (6'1, 205); 56 – Ty Black Elk-Volkmann – Freshman (6'2, 230); 62 – Demetrious Moctezuma – Freshman (5'9, 250); 67 – Caden Beauchamp – Freshman (6'3, 215); 57 – Jaden Fisher – Freshman (6'1, 225)	Linebackers: 0 – Gabriel Chambliss – Junior (6'0, 205); 11 – Chris Guipi-Bopala – Senior (6'0, 215); 34 – Cole Paulson (C) – Sophomore (5'9, 205); 55 – Collin Bruggeman – Senior (6'2, 200); 54 – Oscar Kooistra – Sophomore (6'4, 235); 48 – Taron Serr – Junior (6'1, 210); 47 – Cooper Vincent – Senior (5'9, 195); 14 – Justin Holm – Freshman (5'10, 190); 40 – Rhet Bertram – Junior (6'4, 205); 25 – Kyle Bares – Freshman (5'10, 210); 59 – Ashton Wienk – Freshman (6'0, 200); 53 – Dylan Jessen – Freshman (5'10, 210); 45 – Ronald Begalka – Freshman (6'3, 200); 33 – Alexzander Lillefloren – Freshman (6'2, 215); 12 – Kaden Van Otterloo – Freshman (6'2, 210); 13 – Aiden Geraets – Freshman (6'0, 205); 58 – Devan Hendricks – Freshman (6'0, 185); 52 – Lucas Chamberlain – Freshman (6'1, 180); 50 – Brock Tuttle – Freshman (5'11, 225); 39 – Carson Fielder – Freshman (6'2, 195); Defensive backs: 4 – Kaden Eng – Junior (6'1, 200); 6 – Jay Skogerboe (C) – Senior (6'1, 190); 2 – Deveon Moses – Junior (6'0, 180); 5 – Blake Duran – Senior (5'11, 155); 3 – Michael Foster – Junior (5'10, 180); 1 – Tristen Perry – Junior (6'1, 170); 9 – Trey Ortman – Gr. (6'2, 190); 10 – My'Quel Johnson – Junior (5'10, 190); 19 – Trevon Johnson – Junior (5'9, 170); 8 – Tamareon Foster – Sophomore (5'10, 185); 22 – Jordan Upton – Freshman (5'10, 175); 27 – Devyn Anderson – Freshman (6'0, 170); 26 – Aidan Jahns – Sophomore (6'3, 195); 20 – Nicholas Randall – Freshman (6'2, 165); 23 – Trent Foss – Freshman (5'10, 175)
Legend: (C) Team captain; (S) Suspended; (I) Ineligible; Injured; Redshirt

==== Coaching staff ====
Position	Name	Alma mater
Head coach & tight ends	Josh Anderson	North Dakota State University
Offensive coordinator & quarterbacks	Logan Levy	University of Maryland, Baltimore County
Defensive coordinator & middle linebackers	Anvil Sinsabaugh	Morningside University
Defensive backs	Daidrick Kibbie	Dakota State University
Offensive line	Deonte Randle	Dakota State University
Defensive line	Ryan Ross	Briar Cliff University
Wide receivers	Tobin Sharp	
Outside linebackers	Devonte Murphy	
Safeties	Brock Swanson	
	Clifton Marshall	
	Mike Trimble	
	Cole Cartwright	

== 2025 ==
2025 Dakota State Trojans football
- Conference: Frontier Conference
- East Division
- Record: 8–2 (5–1 Frontier East)
- Head coach: Josh Anderson (17th season)
- Offensive coordinator: Logan Levy (2nd season)
- Defensive coordinator: Daidrick Kibbie (1st season)
- Home stadium: Brian Kern Family Stadium

2025 Frontier Conference football standings
	Conf.			Overall
Team	W		L	W		L
East Division
No. 5 Montana Tech x^	6	–	0	12	–	1
No. 25 Dakota State	5	–	1	8	–	2
Rocky Mountain	4	–	2	4	–	6
Valley City State	3	–	3	6	–	4
Mayville State	2	–	4	5	–	6
Dickinson State	1	–	5	3	–	7
Montana State–Northern	0	–	6	1	–	10
West Division
No. 4 College of Idaho x^	6	–	0	11	–	2
No. 13 Carroll (MT) ^	5	–	1	9	–	3
No. 18 Montana Western	4	–	2	7	–	3
Eastern Oregon	3	–	3	4	–	6
Southern Oregon	2	–	4	3	–	7
Arizona Christian	1	–	5	2	–	8
Simpson (CA)	0	–	6	0	–	10
x – Division champion/co-champions; ^ – NAIA playoff participant; Rankings from NAIA Coaches' Poll

The 2025 Dakota State Trojans football team represents Dakota State University as a member of the Frontier Conference during the 2025 NAIA football season. Led by 17th-year head coach Josh Anderson, the Trojans play home games at Brian Kern Family Stadium in Madison, South Dakota.

=== Schedule ===
Date	Time	Opponent	Site	TV	Result	Attendance
August 30	7:00 p.m.	at Dakota Wesleyan*	Joe Quintal Field; Mitchell, SD (Chamber of Commerce Traveling Cup)	YouTube	L 14–16	1,650
September 6	7:00 p.m.	Nebraska Wesleyan*	Brian Kern Family Stadium; Madison, SD	YouTube	W 37–7	1,500
September 20	9:00 p.m.	at Arizona Christian*	ACU Football Field; Glendale, AZ	GSAC Sports Network	W 44–27	1,172
September 27	2:00 p.m.	(RV) Southern Oregon*^{†}	Brian Kern Family Stadium; Madison, SD	YouTube	W 11–10	1,200
October 4	2:00 p.m.	at No. 5 Montana Tech	Alumni Coliseum; Butte, MT	YouTube	L 21–49	
October 11	2:00 p.m.	at Dickinson State	Henry Biesiot Activities Center; Dickinson, ND	YouTube	W 27–25	3,896
October 18	4:00 p.m.	Valley City State	Brian Kern Family Stadium; Madison, SD	YouTube	W 40–7	507
November 1	4:00 p.m.	Mayville State	Jerome Berg Stadium; Mayville, ND	YouTube	W 44–14	
November 8	12:00 p.m.	Rocky Mountain	Brian Kern Family Stadium; Madison, SD	YouTube	W 38–7	425
November 15	1:00 p.m.	MSU–Northern	Brian Kern Family Stadium; Madison, SD	YouTube	W 50–3	500
*Non-conference game; ^{†}Homecoming; Rankings from NAIA Poll released prior to the game; All times are in Central time

=== Rankings ===
Ranking movements Legend: ██ Increase in ranking ██ Decrease in ranking — = Not ranked RV = Received votes
	Week											
Poll	Pre	1	2	3	4	5	6	7	8	9	10	Final
Coaches	—	—	—	—	—	—	RV	RV	RV	RV	24	25

=== Personnel ===
==== Roster ====
2025 Dakota State Trojans Football
Quarterbacks: 9 – Tray Hettick – Junior; 10 – Mason Miller – Freshman; 11 – Sean Eaton – Sophomore; 13 – Landon Quist – Freshman; 19 – Carter Williams – Freshman; Running backs: 2 – Trajan Davis – Sophomore; 3 – Preston Iverson – Junior; 7 – Ashton Sandbulte – Junior; 13 – Niyongabo Yohana – Junior; 20 – Darius Jay – Freshman; 22 – Sam Glesiah – Freshman; 24 – Samuel Livingston – Freshman; 25 – Jerys Burckhard – Freshman; 46 – Anthony Moser – Sophomore; Wide receivers: 1 – Jovi Wolf – Sophomore; 4 – Maddox Kihne – Junior; 5 – Victor Boggs Jr. – Junior; 6 – Melek Ford – Sophomore; 12 – Pierce Gomarko – Freshman; 14 – Grant VanDenHul – Freshman; 15 – Marcuson Taylor Jr. – Freshman; 16 – Caden Langenfeld – Freshman; 18 – Timothy Halbur – Sophomore; 80 – Layton Smith – Freshman; 82 – Miles Eide – Freshman; 83 – Christopher Aasen – Freshman; 85 – Garret Merkley – Freshman; 87 – Amari Dirks – Freshman; 89 – Kolter Simon – Freshman; Tight ends: 0 – Eddie Merrell III – Sophomore; 8 – Owen Heath – Sophomore; 17 – Gus Sanford – Senior; 42 – Kaden Van Egdom – Freshman; 43 – Ashton Fairbanks – Freshman; 84 – Nathan Cook – Senior; 88 – Oliver Wirth – Freshman	Kicker/Punter: 15 – Xander Sheehan – Senior; 35 – Nohel Torres – Freshman; 36 – Adrian Villanueva – Freshman; 37 – Carson Sauseda – Senior; Long snappers: 23 – Cade Willnerd – Freshman; 39 – Drew Mildebrandt – Freshman; Offensive linemen: 50 – Zane Tucker – Senior; 51 – Hudson Kempf – Freshman; 52 – Aidyn Janis – Freshman; 53 – Thomas Lett – Junior; 54 – Derek Moreno – Sophomore; 55 – Kendall Cauley – Junior; 56 – Brady Altenburg – Freshman; 57 – Layton Loup – Freshman; 63 – Hudson Arbach – Freshman; 65 – Joshua Shaffer – Junior; 67 – Shawn Crouch – Freshman; 68 – Sam Sather – Senior; 70 – Aiden Novak – Freshman; 71 – Seth Gawerecki – Senior; 72 – Jose Rodriguez – Freshman; 73 – Weston Leverson – Freshman; 74 – Brandon Kjetland – Sophomore; 75 – Tyler Kjetland – Senior; 76 – Ethan Crouch – Freshman; 78 – Uziel Ruiz – Junior; Defensive linemen: 51 – Allen Reed – Sophomore; 58 – Parker Petry – Freshman; 66 – Bonnard Bosler – Freshman; 77 – Brooks Jansen – Senior; 90 – Caleb Dwyer – Senior; 91 – William Katchmark – Senior; 93 – Caden Beauchamp – Freshman; 94 – Jacob Imdieke – Freshman; 98 – Jaden Fisher – Freshman; 99 – Kacey Cauley – Senior; 62 – Demetrious Moctezuma – Freshman; 64 – Deke Scott – Freshman; 79 – Griffin Reiner – Sophomore; 92 – Jack Hemmen – Senior; 95 – Elliott Devries – Sophomore; 96 – Lamarcus Osborne – Freshman; 97 – Jeremiah Scott – Senior	Linebackers: 0 – Gabriel Chambliss – Senior; 5 – Josiah Perez – Junior; 6 – Joseph Cole – Junior; 7 – Jordan Cooper – Sophomore; 10 – Ashton Wienk – Sophomore; 12 – Kaden Van Otterloo – Freshman; 14 – Justin Holm – Junior; 23 – Tristan Sontag – Freshman; 24 – Cooper Maras – Senior; 25 – Kyle Bares – Sophomore; 32 – Matthew Caviezel – Junior; 33 – Alexander Lillefloren – Freshman; 34 – Cole Paulson – Senior; 38 – Hayden Westman – Freshman; 40 – Rhet Bertram – Senior; 41 – Jamal Whithead – Freshman; 45 – Talon George – Freshman; 47 – Brody Frick – Freshman; 48 – Taron Serr – Senior; 49 – Lane Deutsch – Freshman; 50 – Brock Christopherson – Freshman; 52 – Lucas Chamberlain – Freshman; 53 – Dylan Jessen – Sophomore; 54 – Oscar Kooistra – Junior; 55 – Gunnar Sarkela – Freshman; 56 – Joseph Gillis – Freshman; 57 – Hunter Johnson – Freshman; 59 – Kowynn Muhl – Freshman; Defensive backs: 1 – Ashley Brantley – Junior; 2 – Deveon Moses – Senior; 3 – Michael Foster – Senior; 9 – Damarius Fletcher – Freshman; 19 – Trevon Johnson – Senior; 27 – Devyn Anderson – Freshman; 29 – Isse Ibrahim – Freshman; 4 – Kaden Eng – Senior; 8 – Tamareon Foster – Sophomore; 9 – My'Quel Johnson – Senior; 11 – Nicholas Randall – Freshman; 15 – Trent Foss – Freshman; 20 – Jeremiah Schulte – Freshman; 21 – Daniel Agyeman – Freshman; 22 – Jordan Upton – Sophomore; 26 – Aidan Jahns – Junior; 28 – Kaden Mathieu – Freshman; 30 – Sean Griesse – Freshman
Legend: (C) Team captain; (S) Suspended; (I) Ineligible; Injured; Redshirt

==== Coaching staff ====
Position	Name	Alma mater
Head coach & tight ends	Josh Anderson	North Dakota State University
Offensive coordinator & quarterbacks	Logan Levy	University of Maryland, Baltimore County
Interim defensive coordinator & Defensive backs	Daidrick Kibbie	Dakota State University
Offensive line	Deonte Randle	Dakota State University
Defensive line	Devonte Murphy	Dakota State University
Graduate assistant	Blake Duran	Dakota State University
Assistant coach	Clifton Marshal	
Assistant coach	Mike Trimble	
Assistant coach	Cole Cartwright	
Student Assistant	Noah McCant	
Student Assistant	Dylan Jessen	
Student Assistant	Sadie Lindeman	
Student Assistant	Marina Kollmann	

== 2026 ==
2026 Dakota State Trojans football
- Conference: Frontier Conference
- Record: 7–4 (3–3 Frontier)
- Head coach: Josh Anderson (18th season)
- Offensive coordinator: Logan Levy (3rd season)
- Defensive coordinator: Daidrick Kibbie (2nd season)
- Home stadium: Brian Kern Family Stadium

2026 Frontier Conference football standings
	Conf.			Overall
Team	W		L	W		L
East Division
No. 5 Montana Tech x	5	–	0	9	–	1
Rocky Mountain	4	–	1	5	–	4
Dickinson State	4	–	2	5	–	6
Dakota State	2	–	3	6	–	4
Mayville State	2	–	3	6	–	4
Valley City State	1	–	4	2	–	7
Montana State–Northern	0	–	5	0	–	10
West Division
No. 1 College of Idaho x	5	–	0	9	–	0
No. 14 Carroll (MT)	4	–	1	7	–	2
Eastern Oregon	4	–	1	7	–	2
Southern Oregon	2	–	3	3	–	6
Montana Western	2	–	4	4	–	6
Simpson (CA)	1	–	4	3	–	6
Arizona Christian	0	–	5	0	–	9
x – Division champion/co-champions; ^ – NAIA playoff participant; As of November 7, 2026; Rankings from NAIA NSC Poll; Source: Frontier Conference

The 2026 Dakota State Trojans football team represents Dakota State University as a member of the Frontier Conference during the 2026 NAIA football season. Led by 18th-year head coach Josh Anderson, the Trojans play home games at Brian Kern Family Stadium in Madison, South Dakota.

=== Schedule ===
Date	Time	Opponent	Site	TV	Result	Attendance
August 29	7:00 p.m.	Dakota Wesleyan*	Brian Kern Family Stadium; Madison, SD (Chamber of Commerce Traveling Cup)	YouTube	W 35–27	1,404
September 5	2:00 p.m.	at Black Hills State*	Lyle Hare Stadium; Spearfish, SD	RMAC Network	L 31–44	2,763
September 12	6:00 p.m.	Nebraska Wesleyan*	Brian Kern Family Stadium; Madison, SD	YouTube	W 52–0	1,500
September 19	1:00 p.m.	Arizona Christian*	Brian Kern Family Stadium; Madison, SD	YouTube	W 44–17	1,000
September 26	3:00 p.m.	at Southern Oregon*	Raider Stadium; Ashland, OR	Cascade Sports Network	W 27–25	1,350
October 3	1:00 p.m.	No. 6 Montana Tech	Brian Kern Family Stadium; Madison, SD	YouTube	L 21–33	799
October 10	3:00 p.m.	Dickinson State	Brian Kern Family Stadium; Madison, SD	YouTube	L 19–20	1,256
October 17	4:00 p.m.	at Valley City State	Lokken Stadium; Valley City, ND	YouTube	W 42–21	
October 31	1:00 p.m.	Mayville State	Brian Kern Family Stadium; Madison, SD	YouTube	W 51–21	748
November 7	1:00 p.m.	at Rocky Mountain	Rocky Bowl; Billings, MT	Urban Edge Network	L 30–33	
November 14	1:00 p.m.	at MSU–Northern	Tilleman Field; Havre, MT	YouTube	W 42–33	
*Non-conference game; Rankings from NAIA Poll released prior to the game; All times are in Central time

=== Rankings ===
Ranking movements Legend: ██ Increase in ranking ██ Decrease in ranking RV = Received votes
	Week											
Poll	Pre	1	2	3	4	5	6	7	8	9	10	Final
Coaches'	25	23	21	22	23	RV	RV					

=== Personnel ===
==== Coaching staff ====
Position	Name	Alma mater
Head coach / Tight ends	Josh Anderson	North Dakota State University
Offensive coordinator / Quarterbacks / Camp Coordinator	Logan Levy	University of Maryland, Baltimore County
Defensive coordinator / Defensive backs & safeties / Recruiting coordinator	Daidrick Kibbie	Dakota State University
Offensive line / Equipment coordinator	Deonte Randle	Dakota State University
Linebackers / Special teams / Academic coordinator	Tom Clarey	Northwestern College
Defensive line / Video coordinator	Zach Santolla	Emory & Henry University
Assistant coach	Clifton Marshall	
Graduate assistant / Director of football operations	Sadie Lindeman	
Graduate assistant / Assistant offensive line	Tyler Kjetland	
Graduate assistant / Wide receivers	Sam Holman	
Graduate assistant / Running backs	Lane VanderWal	
Graduate assistant / Specialists	Xander Sheehan	
Student assistant / Assistant defensive backs / Cornerbacks	Deveon Moses	
Student assistant	Aaron Brown	
Team manager	Courtney Stewart	
