= Dakota State Trojans football, 2010–2019 =

American college football seasons

The Dakota State Trojans football program from 2010 to 2019 represented Dakota State University in college football during the 2010s. The Trojans were members of the Dakota Athletic Conference (DAC) in 2010, competed as an NAIA independent from 2011 to 2012, and then joined the North Star Athletic Association (NSAA) in 2013. Josh Anderson, who has served as Dakota State's head coach since 2009, led the team for the entire decade. The team played home games at Trojan Field in Madison, South Dakota.

== 2010 ==
2010 Dakota State Trojans football
- Conference: Dakota Athletic Conference
- Record: 0–10 (0–8 DAC)
- Head coach: Josh Anderson (2nd season)
- Home stadium: Trojan Field

2010 Dakota Athletic Conference football standings
	Conf.			Overall
Team	W		L	W		L
No. 10 Dickinson State $^	7	–	1	9	–	2
No. 20 South Dakota Mines	6	–	2	7	–	3
Minot State	6	–	2	6	–	4
Black Hills State	5	–	3	6	–	4
Jamestown	4	–	4	5	–	5
Valley City State	3	–	5	4	–	6
Mayville State	1	–	7	2	–	8
Dakota State	0	–	8	0	–	10
$ – Conference champion; ^ – NAIA playoff participant; Rankings from NAIA Coaches' Poll

The 2010 Dakota State Trojans football team represented Dakota State University as a member of the Dakota Athletic Conference (DAC) during the 2010 NAIA football season. Led by second-year head coach Josh Anderson, the Trojans compiled an overall record of 0–10 with a mark of 0–8 in conference play, placing last out of eighth teams in the DAC.

=== Schedule ===
Date	Time	Opponent	Site	Result	Attendance	Source
August 28	7:00 p.m.	Midland*	Trojan Field; Madison, SD	L 7–38		
September 11	12:00 p.m.	at Wisconsin–Whitewater*	Perkins Stadium; Whitewater, WI	L 7–70	5,489	
September 18	1:30 p.m.	at No. 13 Dickinson State	Badland Activities Center; Dickinson, ND	L 7–31	2,000	
September 25	6:00 p.m.	South Dakota Mines^{†}	Trojan Field; Madison, SD	L 14–41		
October 2	2:00 p.m.	at Black Hills State	Lyle Hare Stadium; Spearfish, SD	L 9–14		
October 9	1:30 p.m.	Minot State	Trojan Field; Madison, SD	L 19–35		
October 16	1:30 p.m.	at Valley City State	Lokken Field; Valley City, ND	L 10–54	756	
October 23	1:30 p.m.	Jamestown	Trojan Field; Madison, SD	L 48–58		
October 30	1:30 p.m.	at Mayville State	Jerome Berg Field; Mayville, ND	L 14–21		
November 7	9:00 a.m.	vs. Valley City State	Fargodome; Fargo, ND (DAC Bowl)	L 39–62	657	
*Non-conference game; ^{†}Homecoming; Rankings from NAIA Poll released prior to the game; All times are in Central time

== 2011 ==
2011 Dakota State Trojans football
- Conference: Independent
- Record: 1–10
- Head coach: Josh Anderson (3rd season)
- Home stadium: Trojan Field

2011 NAIA independents football records
	Conf.			Overall
Team	W		L	W		L
No. 16 Valley City State ^		–		9	–	2
No. 5 Azusa Pacific ^		–		9	–	3
Menlo		–		5	–	5
Southern Oregon		–		5	–	5
Mayville State		–		5	–	6
Walsh		–		5	–	6
Dickinson State		–		4	–	6
Edward Waters		–		4	–	6
Malone		–		4	–	7
Robert Morris (IL)		–		4	–	6
Webber International		–		4	–	6
Jamestown		–		3	–	7
Southern Virginia		–		2	–	7
West Virginia Tech		–		1	–	9
Dakota State		–		1	–	10
Ave Maria		–		0	–	9
Haskell		–		0	–	11
^ – NAIA playoff participant; Rankings from NAIA Coaches' Poll

The 2011 Dakota State Trojans football team represented Dakota State University as an independent during the 2011 NAIA football season. Led by third-year head coach Josh Anderson, the Trojans compiled a record of 1–10.

=== Schedule ===
Date	Time	Opponent	Site	Result	Attendance
August 27	7:00 p.m.	at No. 17 Midland	Memorial Field; Fremont, NE	L 20–47	1,100
September 3	6:00 p.m.	Dakota Wesleyan	Trojan Field; Madison, SD	L 20–56	
September 10	4:00 p.m.	Doane	Trojan Field; Madison, SD	L 13–52	
September 17	2:00 p.m.	at Valley City State	Shelly Ellig Field; Valley City, ND	L 27–44	
September 24	4:00 p.m.	Northwestern (IA)^{†}	Trojan Field; Madison, SD	L 27–63	
October 1	1:00 p.m.	at Concordia (NE)	Bulldog Stadium; Seward, NE	L 21–49	674
October 8	1:00 p.m.	at Hastings	Lloyd Wilson Field; Hastings, NE	L 14–44	800
October 15	1:00 p.m.	Briar Cliff	Trojan Field; Madison, SD	W 24–16	
October 22	4:00 p.m.	Dordt	Trojan Field; Madison, SD	L 20–40	
October 29	2:00 p.m.	at South Dakota Mines	O'Harra Stadium; Rapid City, SD	L 17–42	
November 5	2:00 p.m.	at Mayville State	Jerome Berg Field; Mayville, ND	L 0–6	
^{†}Homecoming; Rankings from NAIA Poll released prior to the game; All times are in Central time

== 2012 ==
2012 Dakota State Trojans football
- Conference: Independent
- Record: 2–9
- Head coach: Josh Anderson (4th season)
- Home stadium: Trojan Field

2012 NAIA independents football records
	Conf.			Overall
Team	W		L	W		L
Robert Morris (IL)		–		8	–	3
No. 24 Valley City State		–		7	–	3
Bacone		–		7	–	4
Langston		–		6	–	4
Edward Waters		–		5	–	6
Jamestown		–		4	–	6
Lindenwood–Belleville		–		4	–	6
Mayville State		–		4	–	6
Menlo		–		4	–	6
SAGU		–		4	–	6
Southern Virginia		–		4	–	6
Webber International		–		4	–	6
Point		–		2	–	8
Wayland Baptist		–		2	–	8
Dakota State		–		2	–	9
Texas College		–		2	–	9
Ave Maria		–		1	–	7
Haskell		–		1	–	8
Rankings from NAIA Coaches' Poll

The 2012 Dakota State Trojans football team represented Dakota State University as an independent during the 2011 NAIA football season. Led by fourth-year head coach Josh Anderson, the Trojans compiled a record of 2–9.

=== Schedule ===
Date	Time	Opponent	Site	Result	Attendance
August 25	4:00 p.m.	Peru State	Trojan Field; Madison, SD	L 27–35	
September 1	7:00 p.m.	at Dakota Wesleyan	Joe Quintal Field; Mitchell, SD	L 14–40	2,150
September 8	7:00 p.m.	at No. 21 Doane	Simon Field; Crete, NE	L 14–35	950
September 15	4:00 p.m.	No. 21 Valley City State	Trojan Field; Madison, SD	L 31–41	
September 22	1:00 p.m.	at No. 16 Northwestern (IA)	DeValois Stadium; Orange City, IA	L 12–47	2,869
September 29	4:00 p.m.	Concordia (NE)^{†}	Trojan Field; Madison, SD	L 7–28	
October 6	4:00 p.m.	No. 21 Hastings	Trojan Field; Madison, SD	L 19–55	
October 13	1:00 p.m.	at Briar Cliff	Memorial Field; Sioux City, IA	W 35–28	700
October 20	1:00 p.m.	at Dordt	Open Space Park; Sioux Center, IA	L 7–24	
October 27	1:00 p.m.	Jamestown	Trojan Field; Madison, SD	W 35–34 ^{2OT}	
November 3	3:00 p.m.	Mayville State	Trojan Field; Madison, SD	L 33–34	
^{†}Homecoming; Rankings from NAIA Poll released prior to the game; All times are in Central time

== 2013 ==
2013 Dakota State Trojans football
- Conference: North Star Athletic Association
- Record: 2–8 (2–2 NSAA)
- Head coach: Josh Anderson (5th season)
- Home stadium: Trojan Field

2013 North Star Athletic Association football standings
	Conf.			Overall
Team	W		L	W		L
Valley City State +	3	–	1	5	–	5
Jamestown +	3	–	1	3	–	7
Mayville State	2	–	2	7	–	4
Dakota State	2	–	2	3	–	8
Presentation	0	–	4	5	–	5
+ – Conference co-champions

The 2013 Dakota State Trojans football team represented Dakota State University as a member of the newly-formed North Star Athletic Association (NSAA) during the 2010 NAIA football season. Led by fifth-year head coach Josh Anderson, the Trojans compiled an overall record of 2–8 with a mark of 2–2 in conference play, tying for third place in the NSAA.

=== Schedule ===
Date	Time	Opponent	Site	Result	Attendance
August 31	7:00 p.m.	at Peru State*	Bulldog Stadium; Auburn, NE	L 21–56	
September 7	6:00 p.m.	Dordt*	Trojan Field; Madison, SD	L 13–14	
September 14	6:00 p.m.	at Valley City State	Shelly Ellig Field; Valley City, ND	L 20–63	
September 21	6:00 p.m.	at Presentation	Swisher Field; Aberdeen, SD	W 35–28	200
September 28	4:00 p.m.	No. 20 Concordia (NE)*^{†}	Trojan Field; Madison, SD	L 0–24	
October 5	7:00 p.m.	Dakota Wesleyan*	Trojan Field; Madison, SD	L 14–23	
October 12	1:00 p.m.	at Jamestown	Rollie Greeno Field; Jamestown, ND	W 31–28	1,438
October 19	1:00 p.m.	Briar Cliff*	Trojan Field; Madison, SD	L 31–37	
October 26	2:00 p.m.	at South Dakota Mines*	O'Harra Stadium; Rapid City, SD	L 25–69	
October 30	3:00 p.m.	at Mayville State	Jerome Berg Field; Mayville, ND	L 14–20	
*Non-conference game; ^{†}Homecoming; Rankings from NAIA Poll released prior to the game; All times are in Central time

== 2014 ==
2014 Dakota State Trojans football
- Conference: North Star Athletic Association
- Record: 6–5 (2–4 NSAA)
- Head coach: Josh Anderson (6th season)
- Home stadium: Trojan Field

2014 North Star Athletic Association football standings
	Conf.			Overall
Team	W		L	W		L
No. 17 Valley City State $^	6	–	0	9	–	2
Dickinson State	5	–	1	7	–	4
Jamestown	4	–	2	5	–	5
Presentation	3	–	3	6	–	4
Dakota State	2	–	4	6	–	5
Waldorf	1	–	5	3	–	7
Mayville State	0	–	6	2	–	9
$ – Conference champion; ^ – NAIA playoff participant; Rankings from NAIA Coaches' Poll

The 2014 Dakota State Trojans football team represented Dakota State University as a member of the North Star Athletic Association (NSAA) during the 2014 NAIA football season. Led by sixth-year head coach Josh Anderson, the Trojans compiled an overall record of 6–5 with a mark of 2–4 in conference play, placing fifth in the NSAA.

=== Schedule ===
Date	Time	Opponent	Site	Result	Attendance
August 30	6:00 p.m.	Mayville State	Trojan Field; Madison, SD	W 28–20	
September 6	6:00 p.m.	at Dordt*	Open Space Park; Sioux Center, IA	W 41–7	
September 13	6:00 p.m.	Valley City State	Trojan Field; Madison, SD	L 10–34	
September 20	4:00 p.m.	Presentation^{†}	Trojan Field; Madison, SD	L 37–40	
September 27	6:00 p.m.	at Concordia (NE)*	Bulldog Stadium; Seward, NE	W 22–21	1,009
October 4	6:00 p.m.	at No. 20 Dakota Wesleyan*	Joe Quintal Stadium; Mitchell, SD	L 22–27	2,500
October 11	1:00 p.m.	Jamestown	Trojan Field; Madison, SD	L 29–37	
October 16	7:00 p.m.	vs. Briar Cliff*	DakotaDome; Vermillion, SD	W 22–17	500
October 25	1:00 p.m.	Trinity Bible*	Trojan Field; Madison, SD	W 69–13	
November 1	1:00 p.m.	at Waldorf	Bolstorff Field; Forest City, IA	W 51–41	
November 8	2:00 p.m.	at Dickinson State	Bolstorff Field; Forest City, IA	L 17–20 ^{OT}	
*Non-conference game; ^{†}Homecoming; Rankings from NAIA Poll released prior to the game; All times are in Central time

== 2015 ==
2015 Dakota State Trojans football
- Conference: North Star Athletic Association
- Record: 6–5 (4–2 NSAA)
- Head coach: Josh Anderson (7th season)
- Defensive coordinator: Cory Miller (1st season)
- Home stadium: Trojan Field

2015 North Star Athletic Association football standings
	Conf.			Overall
Team	W		L	W		L
No. 18 Dickinson State $^	5	–	1	8	–	3
Valley City State	4	–	2	7	–	3
Dakota State	4	–	2	6	–	5
Mayville State	3	–	3	5	–	5
Jamestown	3	–	3	4	–	6
Waldorf	2	–	4	3	–	7
Presentation	0	–	6	3	–	6
$ – Conference champion; ^ – NAIA playoff participant; Rankings from NAIA Coaches' Poll

The 2015 Dakota State Trojans football team represented Dakota State University as a member of the North Star Athletic Association (NSAA) during the 2015 NAIA football season. Led by seventh-year head coach Josh Anderson, the Trojans compiled an overall record of 6–5 with a mark of 4–2 in conference play, tying for second place in the NSAA.

=== Schedule ===
Date	Time	Opponent	Site	Result	Attendance	Source
August 29	6:00 p.m.	Dakota Wesleyan*	Trojan Field; Madison, SD	L 27–40	4,500	
September 5	6:00 p.m.	Dordt*	Trojan Field; Madison, SD	W 28–24		
September 12	6:00 p.m.	Waldorf	Trojan Field; Madison, SD	L 17–24		
September 19	1:00 p.m.	Jamestown	Rollie Greeno Stadium; Jamestown, ND	W 38–13		
September 26	1:00 p.m.	at St. Ambrose*	Brady Street Stadium; Davenport, IA	L 35–39		
October 3	3:00 p.m.	Trinity Bible*^{†}	Trojan Field; Madison, SD	W 60–6		
October 10	1:00 p.m.	Valley City State	Lokken Stadium; Valley City, ND	L 24–32		
October 17	1:00 p.m.	No. 24 Dickinson State	Trojan Field; Madison, SD	W 54–21		
October 24	3:00 p.m.	at Mayville State	Jerome Berg Field; Mayville, ND	W 28–21		
October 31	2:00 p.m.	Presentation	Trojan Field; Madison, SD	W 27–16		
November 8	4:00 p.m.	vs. Dickinson State*	Fargodome; Fargo, ND	L 30–49		
*Non-conference game; ^{†}Homecoming; Rankings from NAIA Poll released prior to the game; All times are in Central time

== 2016 ==
2016 Dakota State Trojans football
- Conference: North Star Athletic Association
- Record: 6–4 (3–3 NSAA)
- Head coach: Josh Anderson (8th season)
- Defensive coordinator: Cory Miller (2nd season)
- Home stadium: Trojan Field

2016 North Star Athletic Association football standings
	Conf.			Overall
Team	W		L	W		L
No. 14 Dickinson State $^	6	–	0	9	–	3
Valley City State	4	–	2	6	–	4
Presentation	3	–	3	7	–	3
Dakota State	3	–	3	6	–	4
Jamestown *	3	–	3	4	–	7
Mayville State	2	–	4	4	–	6
Waldorf	0	–	6	1	–	9
$ – Conference champion; ^ – NAIA playoff participant * – Jamestown later forfeited or vacated all its wins. Valley City State and Waldorf were given wins by forfeit.; Rankings from NAIA Coaches' Poll

The 2016 Dakota State Trojans football team represented Dakota State University as a member of the North Star Athletic Association (NSAA) during the 2016 NAIA football season. Led by eighth-year head coach Josh Anderson, the Trojans compiled an overall record of 6–4 with a mark of 3–3 in conference play, placing in a three-way tie for third in the NSAA.

=== Schedule ===
Date	Time	Opponent	Site	Result	Attendance
August 26	7:00 p.m.	at No. 16 Dakota Wesleyan*	Joe Quintal Field; Mitchell, SD	W 34–30	3,500
September 3	6:00 p.m.	at Dordt*	Open Space Park; Sioux Center, IA	L 42–45	
September 10	1:00 p.m.	No. 24 St. Ambrose*	Trojan Field; Madison, SD	W 62–48	
September 17	6:00 p.m.	Waldorf*	Trojan Field; Madison, SD	W 36–14	
September 24	4:00 p.m.	Jamestown^{†}	Trojan Field; Madison, SD	W 36–17	
October 1	4:00 p.m.	at Waldorf	Bolstorff Field; Forest City, IA	W 37–13	431
October 15	4:00 p.m.	Valley City State	Trojan Field; Madison, SD	L 22–41	
October 22	2:00 p.m.	at No. 12 Dickinson State	Henry Biesiot Activities Center; Dickinson, ND	L 12–31	
October 29	1:00 p.m.	Mayville State	Trojan Field; Madison, SD	L 25–27	
November 5	5:00 p.m.	at Presentation	Swisher Field; Aberdeen, SD	W 24–10	
*Non-conference game; ^{†}Homecoming; Rankings from NAIA Poll released prior to the game; All times are in Central time

== 2017 ==
2017 Dakota State Trojans football
- Conference: North Star Athletic Association
- Record: 8–3 (6–2 NSAA)
- Head coach: Josh Anderson (9th season)
- Defensive coordinator: Cory Miller (3rd season)
- Home stadium: Trojan Field

2017 North Star Athletic Association football standings
	Conf.			Overall
Team	W		L	W		L
No. 14 Dickinson State $^	8	–	0	9	–	2
No. 23 Dakota State	6	–	2	8	–	3
Waldorf	5	–	3	7	–	4
Valley City State	4	–	4	5	–	5
Presentation	3	–	5	4	–	6
Jamestown	2	–	6	2	–	9
Mayville State	0	–	8	0	–	11
$ – Conference champion; ^ – NAIA playoff participant * – Jamestown later forfeited or vacated both its wins. Waldorf was given a win by forfeit.; Rankings from NAIA Coaches' Poll

The 2017 Dakota State Trojans football team represented Dakota State University as a member of the North Star Athletic Association (NSAA) during the 2017 NAIA football season. Led by ninth-year head coach Josh Anderson, the Trojans compiled an overall record of 8–3 with a mark of 6–2 in conference play, placing second in the NSAA. The Trojans finished the season ranked No. 23 in the NAIA.

=== Schedule ===
Date	Time	Opponent	Site	Result	Attendance
August 24	7:00 p.m.	No. 17 Dakota Wesleyan*	Trojan Field; Madison, SD (Chamber of Commerce Traveling Cup)	W 56–39	
September 2	1:00 p.m.	at St. Ambrose*	Brady Street Stadium; Davenport, IA	L 24–27	
September 9	1:00 p.m.	at Briar Cliff*	Memorial Field; Sioux City, IA	W 49–33	
September 16	6:00 p.m.	Mayville State	Trojan Field; Madison, SD	W 48–16	
September 25	2:00 p.m.	Presentation^{†}	Howard Wood Field; Sioux Falls, SD	L 21–22	
September 30	1:00 p.m.	at Jamestown	Rollie Greeno Field; Jamestown, ND	W 20–14 ^{OT}	
October 7	6:00 p.m.	Waldorf	Trojan Field; Madison, SD	W 59–20	
October 21	4:00 p.m.	at Valley City State	Shelly Ellig Field; Valley City, ND	W 31–28	600
October 28	12:00 p.m.	No. 15 Dickinson State	Trojan Field; Madison, SD	L 25–28	
November 4	3:00 p.m.	at Mayville State	Jerome Berg Field; Mayville, ND	W 34–6	
November 11	1:00 p.m.	at Presentation	Swisher Field; Aberdeen, SD	W 59–21	
*Non-conference game; ^{†}Homecoming; Rankings from NAIA Poll released prior to the game; All times are in Central time

=== Rankings ===
Ranking movements Legend: ██ Increase in ranking ██ Decrease in ranking — = Not ranked
	Week												
Poll	Pre	1	2	3	4	5	6	7	8	9	10	11	Final
Coaches	—	—	—	—	—	—	—	—	25	—	—	23	23

== 2018 ==
2018 Dakota State Trojans football
- Conference: North Star Athletic Association
- Record: 3–8 (2–5 NSAA)
- Head coach: Josh Anderson (10th season)
- Defensive coordinator: Cory Miller (4th season)
- Home stadium: Trojan Field

2018 North Star Athletic Association football standings
	Conf.			Overall
Team	W		L	W		L
No. 8 Dickinson State $^	6	–	1	9	–	3
Valley City State	5	–	2	6	–	4
Waldorf	5	–	2	5	–	5
Presentation	3	–	4	5	–	5
Dakota State	2	–	5	3	–	8
Mayville State	0	–	7	1	–	9
$ – Conference champion; ^ – NAIA playoff participant; Rankings from NAIA Coaches' Poll

The 2018 Dakota State Trojans football team represented Dakota State University as a member of the North Star Athletic Association (NSAA) during the 2018 NAIA football season. Led by tenth-year head coach Josh Anderson, the Trojans compiled an overall record of 3–8 with a mark of 2–5 in conference play, placing fifth in the NSAA.

=== Schedule ===
Date	Time	Opponent	Site	Result	Attendance
August 23	7:00 p.m.	at Dakota Wesleyan*	Joe Quintal Field; Mitchell, SD (Chamber of Commerce Traveling Cup)	W 27–18	3,367
September 1	1:00 p.m.	St. Ambrose*	Trojan Field; Madison, SD	L 27–49	
September 6	7:00 p.m.	Briar Cliff*	Trojan Field; Madison, SD	L 20–49	
September 15	6:00 p.m.	at Wisconsin–Stevens Point*	Goerke Park; Stevens Point, WI	L 28–51	1,956
September 22	4:00 p.m.	at Waldorf	Bolstorff Field; Forest City, IA	L 35–50	447
September 29	3:00 p.m.	No. 18 Dickinson State^{†}	Trojan Field; Madison, SD	L 27–33	
October 6	4:00 p.m.	Valley City State	Trojan Field; Madison, SD	L 16–27	
October 13	4:00 p.m.	Presentation	Trojan Field; Madison, SD	W 44–28	
October 20	4:00 p.m.	at Mayville State	Jerome Berg Field; Mayville, ND	W 28–19	
October 27	4:00 p.m.	Waldorf	Trojan Field; Madison, SD	L 37–51	
November 3	2:00 p.m.	at No. 16 Dickinson State	Henry Biesiot Activities Center; Dickinson, ND	L 25–41	
*Non-conference game; ^{†}Homecoming; Rankings from NAIA Poll released prior to the game; All times are in Central time

=== Rankings ===
Ranking movements Legend: ██ Increase in ranking ██ Decrease in ranking — = Not ranked
	Week											
Poll	Pre	1	2	3	4	5	6	7	8	9	10	Final
Coaches	25	—	—	—	—	—	—	—	—	—	—	—

== 2019 ==
2019 Dakota State Trojans football
- Conference: North Star Athletic Association
- Record: 5–5 (3–4 NSAA)
- Head coach: Josh Anderson (11th season)
- Defensive coordinator: Paytton Hobbs (1st season)
- Home stadium: Trojan Field

2019 North Star Athletic Association football standings
	Conf.			Overall
Team	W		L	W		L
No. 17 Dickinson State $^	6	–	1	8	–	3
Valley City State	5	–	2	7	–	3
No. 23 Waldorf	5	–	2	7	–	3
Dakota State	3	–	4	5	–	5
Mayville State	1	–	6	2	–	8
Presentation	1	–	6	1	–	9
$ – Conference champion; ^ – NAIA playoff participant; Rankings from NAIA Coaches' Poll

The 2019 Dakota State Trojans football team represented Dakota State University as a member of the North Star Athletic Association during the 2019 NAIA football season. The Trojans were led by 11th-year head coach Josh Anderson. They finished the season with a 5–5 record (3–4 NSAA) and finished 4th in the conference standings.

=== Schedule ===
Date	Time	Opponent	Site	Result	Attendance
August 29	7:00 p.m.	Dakota Wesleyan*	Trojan Field; Madison, SD (Chamber of Commerce Traveling Cup)	W 33–30	
September 7	1:00 p.m.	at Briar Cliff*	Memorial Field; Sioux City, IA	L 10–13	600
September 21	4:00 p.m.	Wisconsin–Stevens Point*^{†}	Trojan Field; Madison, SD	W 38–21	
September 28	2:00 p.m.	at Valley City State	Lokken Stadium; Valley City, ND	L 6–10	
October 5	4:00 p.m.	Presentation	Trojan Field; Madison, SD	W 43–16	
October 13	1:00 p.m.	No. 14 Dickinson State	Trojan Field; Madison, SD	L 14–31	
October 19	2:00 p.m.	at Waldorf	Bolstorff Field; Forest City, IA	L 9–59	
October 26	2:00 p.m.	at Mayville State	Jerome Berg Field; Mayville, ND	W 35–14	
November 2	4:00 p.m.	Valley City State	Trojan Field; Madison, SD	L 18–30	
November 9	1:00 p.m.	at Presentation	Swisher Field; Aberdeen, SD	W 31–29	
*Non-conference game; ^{†}Homecoming; Rankings from NAIA Poll released prior to the game; All times are in Central time
