= 2024 Valley City State Vikings football team =

American college football season

2024 Valley City State Vikings football
- Conference: North Star Athletic Association
- Record: 3–7 (2–6 NSAA)
- Head coach: Dennis McCulloch (28th season)
- Offensive coordinator: Dustin Yorek (6th season)
- Defensive coordinator: Gregg Horner (28th season)
- Home stadium: Lokken Stadium

2024 North Star Athletic Association football standings
	Conf.			Overall
Team	W		L	W		L
No. 14 Dickinson State $^	8	–	0	10	–	1
Dakota State	4	–	4	6	–	4
Mayville State	3	–	5	4	–	6
Jamestown	3	–	5	3	–	7
Valley City State	2	–	6	3	–	7
$ – Conference champion; ^ – NAIA playoff participant; Rankings from NAIA Coaches' Poll

The 2024 Valley City State Vikings football team represented Valley City State University in the 2024 NAIA football season as a member of the North Star Athletic Association (NSAA). The Vikings, led by 28th-year head coach Dennis McCulloch, finished the season with a 3–7 record (2–6 in conference play). The team played its home games at Lokken Stadium in Valley City, North Dakota. While the win-loss record was challenging, the season featured several standout individual performances and marked the final NSAA campaign before transition into the Frontier Conference.

The Vikings opened the season on the road against Minot State Beavers (L 7-38) before recording a road win at Augsburg Auggies (W 24–14). Conference play proved difficult, but VCSU earned victories over the University of Jamestown Jimmies at home (W 38–7) and the Mayville State Comets (W 10–6) to round out the season. Sophomore DB Emanuel Spiyee earned First-Team All-NSAA honors, and several other Vikings were recognized on All-Conference teams.

== Offseason ==
=== Coaching staff changes ===
==== Departures ====
Name	Position	New team	New position
Ethan Postler	Quarterbacks / wide receivers coach	Arlington Renegades	Offensive assistant
Alec Brown	Special teams coordinator / linebackers coach	Bates College	Tight ends coach Special teams coordinator

==== Additions ====
Name	Position	Previous team	Previous position
Garrett Baldwin	Quarterbacks / wide receivers coach	Black Hills High School (WA)	Head coach
Alan Busey	Graduate assistant (Wide receivers)	Feather River College	Wide receivers coach
Jahidi West	Graduate assistant (Linebackers)	Valley City State	Former linebacker

== Preseason ==
=== Victory Sports Network preview ===
On August 7, 2024, Victory Sports Network released its preseason preview of the North Star Athletic Association, projecting Valley City State to finish third behind Dickinson State and Jamestown.

Victory Sports Network noted that Valley City State returned seven starters on offense and six on defense from its 7–3 team in 2023. Quarterback Avery Thorsgard, tight end Trent Finney, wide receivers Dominic Sotomayor and Exavian Westbrook, offensive lineman Taylor Jones, and first-team all-conference defensive lineman Georgie Mageo were highlighted as key returning players for the Vikings.

2024 Victory Sports Network NSAA preseason prediction
Predicted finish	Team
1	Dickinson State
2	Jamestown
3	Valley City State
4	Dakota State
5	Mayville State

=== North Star Athletic Association coaches poll ===
The North Star Athletic Association released its 2024 football coaches' preseason poll on August 19, 2024. Coaches were not permitted to vote for their own teams.

2024 North Star Athletic Association preseason coaches poll
Predicted finish	Team	Points	First-place votes
1	Dickinson State	25	5
2	Valley City State	19	—
3	Jamestown	15	—
4	Mayville State	8	—
5	Dakota State	7	—

== Schedule ==
Date	Time	Opponent	Site	TV	Result	Attendance
August 29	6:00 p.m.	at Minot State*	Herb Parker Stadium; Minot, ND		L 7–38	4,046
September 6	8:00 p.m.	at Augsburg*	Edor Nelson Field; Minneapolis, MN		W 24–14	1,200
September 21	4:00 p.m.	Dakota State^{†}	Lokken Stadium; Valley City, ND		L 8–19	450
September 28	2:00 p.m.	at Mayville State	Jerome Berg Field; Mayville, ND (rivalry)		L 10–16	
October 5	3:00 p.m.	at No. 21 Dickinson State	Biesiot Activities Center; Dickinson, ND (rivalry)		L 6–19	
October 12	1:00 p.m.	Jamestown	Lokken Stadium; Valley City, ND (rivalry)	BEK	W 38–7	2,500
October 26	4:00 p.m.	at Dakota State	Brian Kern Family Stadium; Madison, SD		L 6–13	600
November 2	1:00 p.m.	Mayville State	Lokken Stadium; Valley City, ND		W 10–6	300
November 9	3:00 p.m.	No. 17 Dickinson State	Lokken Stadium; Valley City, ND		L 24–42	200
November 16	1:00 p.m.	at Jamestown	Hansen Stadium; Jamestown, ND		L 17–28	
*Non-conference game; ^{†}Homecoming; Rankings from NAIA Poll released prior to the game; All times are in Central time

== Coaching staff ==
- Dennis McCulloch – Head Coach / Defensive Backs (31st season)
- Gregg Horner – Defensive Coordinator / Defensive Line (31st season)
- Dustin Yorek – Offensive Coordinator / Offensive Line (6th season)
- Brandon Bouma – Recruiting Coordinator / Running Backs / Tight Ends / Kickers (8th season)
- Garrett Baldwin – Quarterbacks (1st season)
- Alan Busey – Wide Receivers (1st season)
- Jahidi West – Linebackers (1st season)
- Trent Kosel – Offensive Assistant (4th season)
- Dave Rausch – Defensive Assistant (38th season)

== Postseason awards ==
All-NSAA First Team

- DB Emanuel Spiyee – So.

All-NSAA Second Team

- WR Jake Deutsch – So.
- DL TaQuez Chatman – Jr.
- OL Bryce Prouty – So.
- Specialist Exavian Westbrook – So.
- QB Avery Thorsgard – Sr.

Honorable Mention

- OL Jonah Larson
- TE Trent Finney
- LB Loke Iese
- DB Gavin Gerhardt
