= Chamber of Commerce Traveling Cup =

American college football trophy

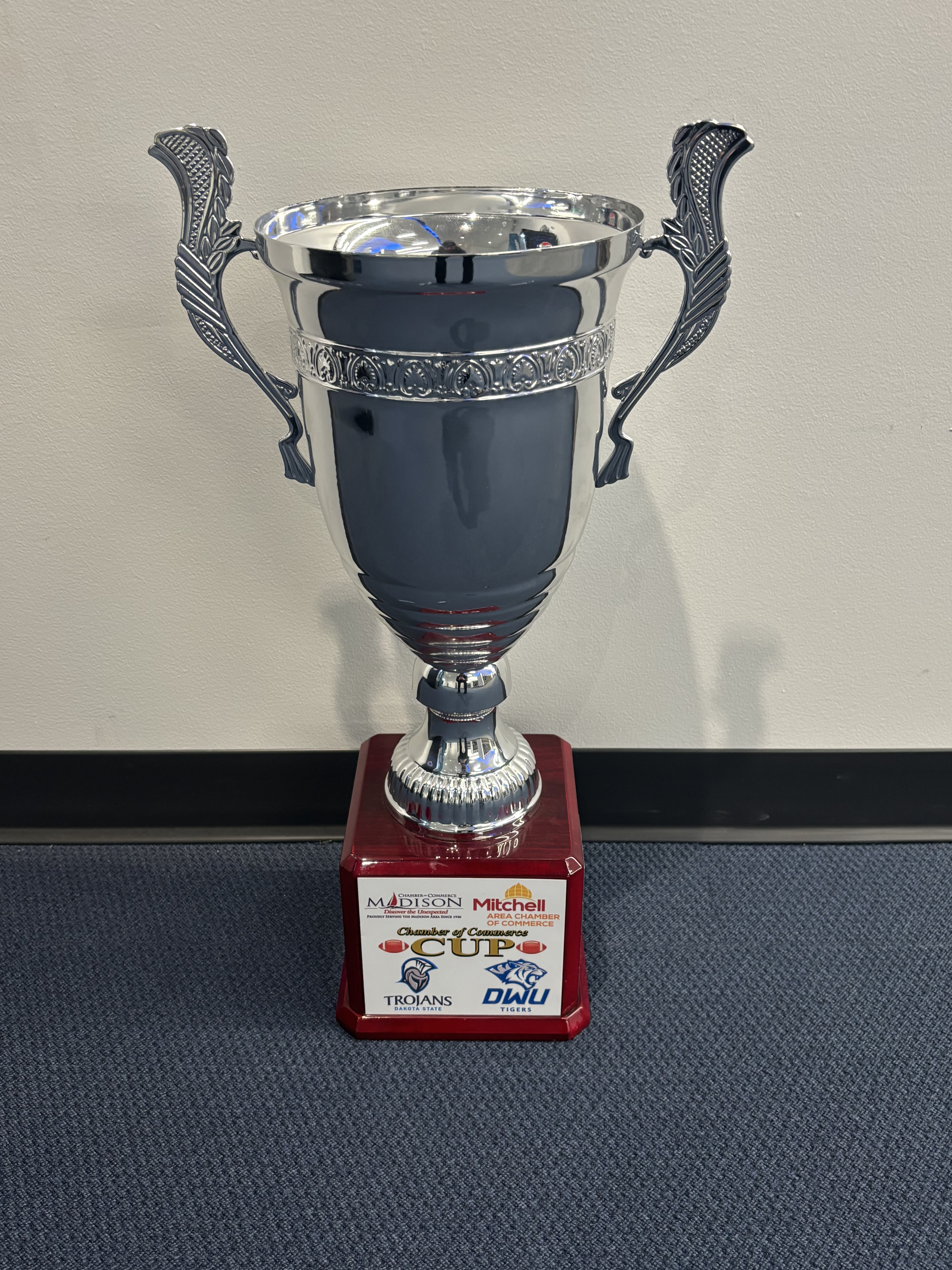
- Sport: Football
- Teams: Dakota State; Dakota Wesleyan
- First meeting: August 25, 2017; Dakota State 56, Dakota Wesleyan 39
- Latest meeting: August 29, 2026; Dakota State 35, Dakota Wesleyan 27

Statistics
- Total meetings: 9
- All-time series: Dakota State leads, 7–2 (.778)
- Largest victory: Dakota State, 34–3 (2024)
- Longest win streak: Dakota State, 5 (2017–2022)
- Current win streak: Dakota State, 1 (2026–present)

Locations of Dakota State and Dakota Wesleyan

The Chamber of Commerce Traveling Cup is a traveling trophy continuously awarded to the winner of the American college football rivalry game between the Dakota State Trojans and the Dakota Wesleyan Tigers. The Trojans currently are in the Frontier Conference and the Tigers are currently in the Great Plains Athletic Conference.

== Series history ==
The Dakota Wesleyan Tigers hold a 41–38–1 all-time series lead against the Dakota State Trojans. However, the Chamber of Commerce Traveling Cup wasn't introduced to the rivalry until 2017. Since then the Trojans hold a series lead of 7–2.

There was no game held in 2020 due to the COVID-19 pandemic.

=== Notable games ===
August 25, 2017: Dakota State upset No. 17 Dakota Wesleyan in the first ever game for the Chamber of Commerce Traveling Cup. It was also the first time that Dakota State had beat Dakota Wesleyan at Trojan Field since 1999.

August 29, 2024: This was the inaugural game for the Trojans at Brian Kern Family Stadium. This game also marked the highest margin of victory, 31 points, in the trophy's history.

== Game results ==
Dakota State victories	Dakota Wesleyan victories	Tie games

No.	Date	Location	Winner	Score
1	August 25, 2017	Trojan Field	Dakota State	56–39
2	August 23, 2018	Joe Quintal Field	Dakota State	27–18
3	August 29, 2019	Trojan Field	Dakota State	33–30
4	August 28, 2021	Joe Quintal Field	Dakota State	6–0
5	August 25, 2022	Trojan Field	Dakota State	29–19
6	August 26, 2023	Joe Quintal Field	Dakota Wesleyan	23–13
7	August 29, 2024	Brian Kern Family Stadium	Dakota State	34–3
8	August 30, 2025	Joe Quintal Field	Dakota Wesleyan	16–14
9	August 29, 2026	Brian Kern Family Stadium	Dakota State	35–27
Series: Dakota State leads 7–2

=== Wins by location ===
Category	Dakota State	Dakota Wesleyan
Madison, SD	5	0
Mitchell, SD	2	2

=== Wins by venue ===
Category	Dakota State	Dakota Wesleyan
Trojan Field	3	0
Joe Quintal Field	2	2
Brian Kern Family Stadium	2	0
