= 2012 Great Plains Athletic Conference football season =

- League: NAIA
- Sport: football
- Duration: Fall-Winter 2012
- Teams: 10

2012
- Season champions: Morningside (IA)
- Runners-up: Northwestern (IA)

Football seasons
- 2011 2013

2012 Great Plains Athletic Conference football standings
	Conf.			Overall
Team	W		L	W		L
No. 2 Morningside $^	9	–	0	13	–	1
No. 12 Northwestern (IA) ^	7	–	2	9	–	3
No. 20 Doane	6	–	3	7	–	3
Dakota Wesleyan	5	–	4	6	–	4
Hastings	5	–	4	6	–	4
Nebraska Wesleyan	5	–	4	6	–	4
Concordia (NE)	4	–	5	5	–	6
Midland	3	–	6	4	–	6
Briar Cliff	1	–	8	1	–	10
Dordt	0	–	9	2	–	9
$ – Conference champion; ^ – NAIA playoff participant; Rankings from NAIA Coaches' Poll

The 2012 Great Plains Athletic Conference football season is made up of 10 United States college athletic programs that compete in the Great Plains Athletic Conference (GPAC) under the National Association of Intercollegiate Athletics (NAIA) for the 2012 college football season. Morningside College of Iowa completed the regular season undefeated to win the conference championship and advance to the 2012 NAIA Football National Championship. Northwestern came in second in conference play and also qualified for the championship tournament, but lost in the first round to the Marian Knights by a score of 42–32.

== Regular season ==
=== Early Games ===
Date	Time	Visiting team	Home team	Site	TV	Result	Attendance	Ref.
August 25, 2012	6:00 PM	No. 13 Benedictine	Concordia	Davis Field • Fayette, Missouri		L 45–37	–	
August 30, 2012	7:00 PM	Valley City State University	No. 8 Morningside	Elwood Olsen Stadium • Sioux City, Iowa		W 7–49	–	
August 30, 2012	7:00 PM	Southwestern	No. 10 Northwestern	DeValois Stadium • Orange City, Iowa		W 0–49	–	
^{#}Rankings from NAIA Coaches' Poll. All times are in Central Time.

==== #13 Benedictine at Concordia (NE) ====
	1	2	3	4	Total
#13 Benedictine	7	10	14	14	45
Concordia (NE)	6	10	7	14	37

Opposing team kickers Zach Keenan (Benedictine) and Kenny Zoeller (Concordia) combined to score 20 of the 82 points in this game.

Leading 9–7, Concordia fumbled in the end zone and Benedictine's Hayden Smith jumping on it for a touchdown and took a 14-9 lead.

Benedictine put on 407 yards in total offense and went 8–16 on third down, while Concordia managed 295 total offensive yards and 5–14 on third down attempts. The final score was a victory for Benedictine 49–36.

==== Southwestern at #10 Northwestern (IA) ====
	1	2	3	4	Total
Southwestern	0	0	0	0	0
#10 Northwestern (IA)	20	6	14	9	49

Tenth ranked Northwestern hosted the Southwestern College Moundbuilders on a Thursday night game in front of 2,347 fans. Southwestern entered the game with optimism of a victory and breaking a losing streak.

Northwestern dominated play the entire game. Head coach Kyle Achterhoff led his team to 649 yards and 7 touchdowns, averaging 7.1 yards per play while holding Southwestern to 156 yards and no points. Southwestern's Ceth Bannister managed a 64-yard punt in the game as a bright spot for Southwestern. The final score was 49–0 with Northwestern winning.

=== Week 1 ===
Date	Time	Visiting team	Home team	Site	TV	Result	Attendance	Ref.
September 1, 2012	1:00 PM	Briar Cliff	Doane	Simon Field • Crete, Nebraska		28–41	–	
September 1, 2012	1:00 PM	St. Mary	Nebraska Wesleyan	Abel Stadium • Lincoln, Nebraska		W 20–25	–	
September 1, 2012	6:00 PM	Dordt	Waldorf College	A. David Bolstorff Field • Forest City, Iowa		W 1–0	–	
September 1, 2012	7:00 PM	Dakota State University	Dakota Wesleyan	Joe Quintal Field • Mitchell, South Dakota		W 14–40	–	
^{#}Rankings from NAIA Coaches' Poll. All times are in Central Time.

=== Week 2 ===
Date	Time	Visiting team	Home team	Site	TV	Result	Attendance	Ref.
September 8, 2012	12:00 PM	Nebraska Wesleyan	Midland	Memorial Field • Fremont, Nebraska		3–7	–	
September 8, 2012	1:00 PM	Graceland University	Briar Cliff	DakotaDome • Vermillion, South Dakota		L 24–17	–	
September 8, 2012	1:00 PM	Dakota Wesleyan	Concordia	Davis Field • Fayette, Missouri		26–23	–	
September 8, 2012	1:00 PM	Hastings	Dordt	Open Space Park Football Field • Sioux Center, Iowa		20–7	–	
September 8, 2012	7:00 PM	Northwestern	No. 8 Morningside	Elwood Olsen Stadium • Sioux City, Iowa		7–34	–	
September 8, 2012	7:00 PM	Dakota State University	Doane	Simon Field • Crete, Nebraska		W 14–35	–	
^{#}Rankings from NAIA Coaches' Poll. All times are in Central Time.

=== Week 3 ===
Date	Time	Visiting team	Home team	Site	TV	Result	Attendance	Ref.
September 15, 2012	1:00 PM	Briar Cliff	No. 22 Dakota Wesleyan	Joe Quintal Field • Mitchell, South Dakota		L 13–24	–	
September 15, 2012	1:00 PM	Dordt	Midland	Memorial Field • Fremont, Nebraska		7–26	–	
September 15, 2012	1:00 PM	Doane	Northwestern	DeValois Stadium • Orange City, Iowa		14–28	–	
September 15, 2012	6:00 PM	No. 4 Morningside	Nebraska Wesleyan	Abel Stadium • Lincoln, Nebraska		35–10	–	
September 15, 2012	6:00 PM	Concordia	Hastings	Lloyd Wilson Field • Hastings, Nebraska		26–34	–	
^{#}Rankings from NAIA Coaches' Poll. All times are in Central Time.

=== Week 4 ===
Date	Time	Visiting team	Home team	Site	TV	Result	Attendance	Ref.
September 22, 2012	1:00 PM	Hastings	Briar Cliff	DakotaDome • Vermillion, South Dakota		34–24	–	
September 22, 2012	1:00 PM	Midland	No. 4 Morningside	Elwood Olsen Stadium • Sioux City, Iowa		0–42	–	
September 22, 2012	1:00 PM	Dordt	Concordia	Davis Field • Fayette, Missouri		12–52	–	
September 22, 2012	1:00 PM	Nebraska Wesleyan	Doane	Simon Field • Crete, Nebraska		24–38	–	
September 22, 2012	1:00 PM	Dakota State University	Northwestern	DeValois Stadium • Orange City, Iowa		W 12–47	–	
^{#}Rankings from NAIA Coaches' Poll. All times are in Central Time.

=== Week 5 ===
Date	Time	Visiting team	Home team	Site	TV	Result	Attendance	Ref.
September 29, 2012	1:00 PM	Briar Cliff	Dordt	Open Space Park Football Field • Sioux Center, Iowa		33–29	–	
September 29, 2012	1:00 PM	Doane	Midland	Memorial Field • Fremont, Nebraska		27–7	–	
September 29, 2012	1:00 PM	Dakota Wesleyan	Hastings	Lloyd Wilson Field • Hastings, Nebraska		30–40 ^{0}	–	
September 29, 2012	1:00 PM	Northwestern	Nebraska Wesleyan	Abel Stadium • Lincoln, Nebraska		33–27 ^{1 OT}	–	
September 29, 2012	4:00 PM	Concordia	Dakota State University	Trojan Field • Madison, South Dakota		W 28–7	–	
^{#}Rankings from NAIA Coaches' Poll. All times are in Central Time.

=== Week 6 ===
Date	Time	Visiting team	Home team	Site	TV	Result	Attendance	Ref.
October 6, 2012	1:00 PM	Concordia	Briar Cliff	DakotaDome • Vermillion, South Dakota		45–12	–	
October 6, 2012	1:00 PM	No. 4 Morningside	Doane	Simon Field • Crete, Nebraska		28–3	–	
October 6, 2012	1:00 PM	Dordt	Dakota Wesleyan	Joe Quintal Field • Mitchell, South Dakota		31–45	–	
October 6, 2012	1:30 PM	Midland	Northwestern	DeValois Stadium • Orange City, Iowa		20–39	–	
October 6, 2012	4:00 PM	Hastings	Dakota State University	Trojan Field • Madison, South Dakota		W 55–19	–	
^{#}Rankings from NAIA Coaches' Poll. All times are in Central Time.

=== Week 7 ===
Date	Time	Visiting team	Home team	Site	TV	Result	Attendance	Ref.
October 13, 2012	1:00 PM	Dakota State University	Briar Cliff	DakotaDome • Vermillion, South Dakota		L 35–28	–	
October 13, 2012	1:00 PM	No. 11 Northwestern	Concordia	Davis Field • Fayette, Missouri		16–17	–	
October 13, 2012	1:00 PM	Nebraska Wesleyan	Dordt	Open Space Park Football Field • Sioux Center, Iowa		27–7	–	
October 13, 2012	2:00 PM	Dakota Wesleyan	No. 4 Morningside	Elwood Olsen Stadium • Sioux City, Iowa		7–63	–	
October 13, 2012	4:00 PM	Hastings	Midland	Memorial Field • Fremont, Nebraska		20–17	–	
^{#}Rankings from NAIA Coaches' Poll. All times are in Central Time.

=== Week 8 ===
Date	Time	Visiting team	Home team	Site	TV	Result	Attendance	Ref.
October 20, 2012	12:00 PM	Midland	Mayville State University	Jerome Berg Field • Mayville, North Dakota		40–40	–	
October 20, 2012	1:00 PM	Briar Cliff	No. 18 Northwestern	DeValois Stadium • Orange City, Iowa		7–57	–	
October 20, 2012	1:00 PM	No. 4 Morningside	Hastings	Lloyd Wilson Field • Hastings, Nebraska		53–23	–	
October 20, 2012	1:00 PM	Concordia	Nebraska Wesleyan	Abel Stadium • Lincoln, Nebraska		6–16	–	
October 20, 2012	1:00 PM	Dakota State University	Dordt	Open Space Park Football Field • Sioux Center, Iowa		W 7–24	–	
October 20, 2012	7:00 PM	Doane	Dakota Wesleyan	Joe Quintal Field • Mitchell, South Dakota		24–28	–	
^{#}Rankings from NAIA Coaches' Poll. All times are in Central Time.

=== Week 9 ===
Date	Time	Visiting team	Home team	Site	TV	Result	Attendance	Ref.
October 27, 2012	1:00 PM	Nebraska Wesleyan	Briar Cliff	DakotaDome • Vermillion, South Dakota		35–14	–	
October 27, 2012	1:00 PM	Midland	Concordia	Davis Field • Fayette, Missouri		14–23	–	
October 27, 2012	1:00 PM	Dordt	No. 4 Morningside	Elwood Olsen Stadium • Sioux City, Iowa		0–41	–	
October 27, 2012	1:00 PM	Hastings	Doane	Simon Field • Crete, Nebraska		16–48	–	
October 27, 2012	7:00 PM	No. 16 Northwestern	No. 25 Dakota Wesleyan	Joe Quintal Field • Mitchell, South Dakota		W 41–13	–	
^{#}Rankings from NAIA Coaches' Poll. All times are in Central Time.

=== Week 10 ===
Date	Time	Visiting team	Home team	Site	TV	Result	Attendance	Ref.
November 3, 2012	1:00 PM	Briar Cliff	Midland	Memorial Field • Fremont, Nebraska		20–28	–	
November 3, 2012	1:00 PM	Concordia	No. 4 Morningside	Elwood Olsen Stadium • Sioux City, Iowa		0–50	–	
November 3, 2012	1:00 PM	Doane	Dordt	Open Space Park Football Field • Sioux Center, Iowa		55–6	–	
November 3, 2012	1:00 PM	Dakota Wesleyan	Nebraska Wesleyan	Abel Stadium • Lincoln, Nebraska		0–17	–	
November 3, 2012	1:00 PM	No. 17 Northwestern	Hastings	Lloyd Wilson Field • Hastings, Nebraska		45–6	–	
^{#}Rankings from NAIA Coaches' Poll. All times are in Central Time.

=== Week 11 ===
Date	Time	Visiting team	Home team	Site	TV	Result	Attendance	Ref.
November 10, 2012	1:00 PM	No. 3 Morningside	Briar Cliff	DakotaDome • Vermillion, South Dakota (Senior Day)		62–0	–	
November 10, 2012	1:00 PM	Midland	Dakota Wesleyan	Joe Quintal Field • Mitchell, South Dakota		14–21	–	
November 10, 2012	1:00 PM	Concordia	Doane	Simon Field • Crete, Nebraska		7–17	–	
November 10, 2012	1:00 PM	Dordt	No. 14 Northwestern	DeValois Stadium • Orange City, Iowa		7–55	–	
November 10, 2012	1:00 PM	Nebraska Wesleyan	Hastings	Lloyd Wilson Field • Hastings, Nebraska		21–14	–	
^{#}Rankings from NAIA Coaches' Poll. All times are in Central Time.

== Post-season ==
=== NAIA FCS Playoffs - First Round ===
Date	Time	Visiting team	Home team	Site	TV	Result	Attendance	Ref.
November 17, 2012		Northwestern	Marian (IN)	St.Vincent Health Field • Indianapolis, Indiana (NAIA FCS Playoffs - First Round)		32–42	–	
November 17, 2012		Montana Tech	Morningside	Elwood Olsen Stadium • Sioux City, Iowa (NAIA FCS Playoffs - First Round)		35–40	–	
^{#}Rankings from NAIA Coaches' Poll. All times are in Central Time.

=== NAIA FCS Playoffs - Quarterfinals ===
Date	Time	Visiting team	Home team	Site	TV	Result	Attendance	Ref.
November 24, 2012		Southern Oregon	Morningside	Elwood Olsen Stadium • Sioux City, Iowa (NAIA FCS Playoffs - Quarterfinals)		44–47 ^{1 OT}	–	
^{#}Rankings from NAIA Coaches' Poll. All times are in Central Time.
