= Dakota State Trojans track and field =

Track and field program of Dakota State University

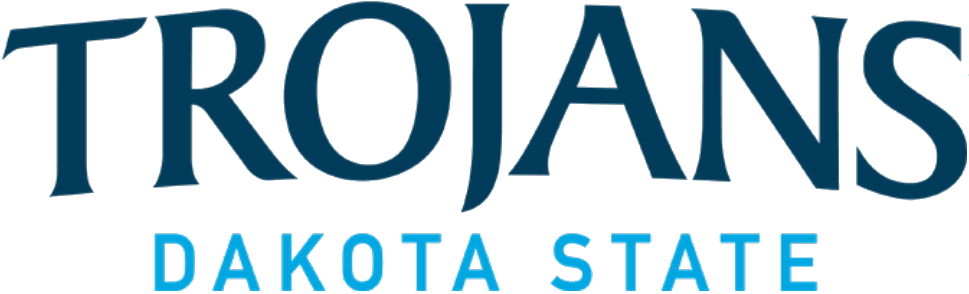
- University: Dakota State University
- Head coach: Alex Glover
- Conference: Frontier
- Location: Madison, South Dakota, US
- Outdoor track: Dan Beacom Track Complex
- Nickname: Dakota State Trojans
- Colors: Trojan blue, DSU blue, and gray

Conference Indoor Championships
- Men's: 1996, 1997, 1998, 2019, 2020, 2022, 2023, 2024, 2025 Women's: 1997

Conference Outdoor Championships
- Men's: 1996, 1997, 2019, 2021, 2022, 2023, 2024 Women's: 1982, 1984, 1995, 1996, 1997, 2026

The Dakota State Trojans track and field program represents Dakota State University in the sport of track and field. The program includes separate men's and women's teams, both of which compete in the National Association of Intercollegiate Athletics (NAIA) as a member of the North Star Athletic Association (NSAA). The Trojans host their home outdoor meets at the Dan Beacom Track Complex, which is located in Madison, South Dakota. Their current head coach is Alex Glover.

== History ==
Conference affiliation

- South Dakota Intercollegiate Conference (1921–2000)
- Dakota Athletic Conference (2000–2011)
- NAIA independent (2011–2013)
- North Star Athletic Association (2013–2025)
- Frontier Conference (2025–)

== Conference championships ==
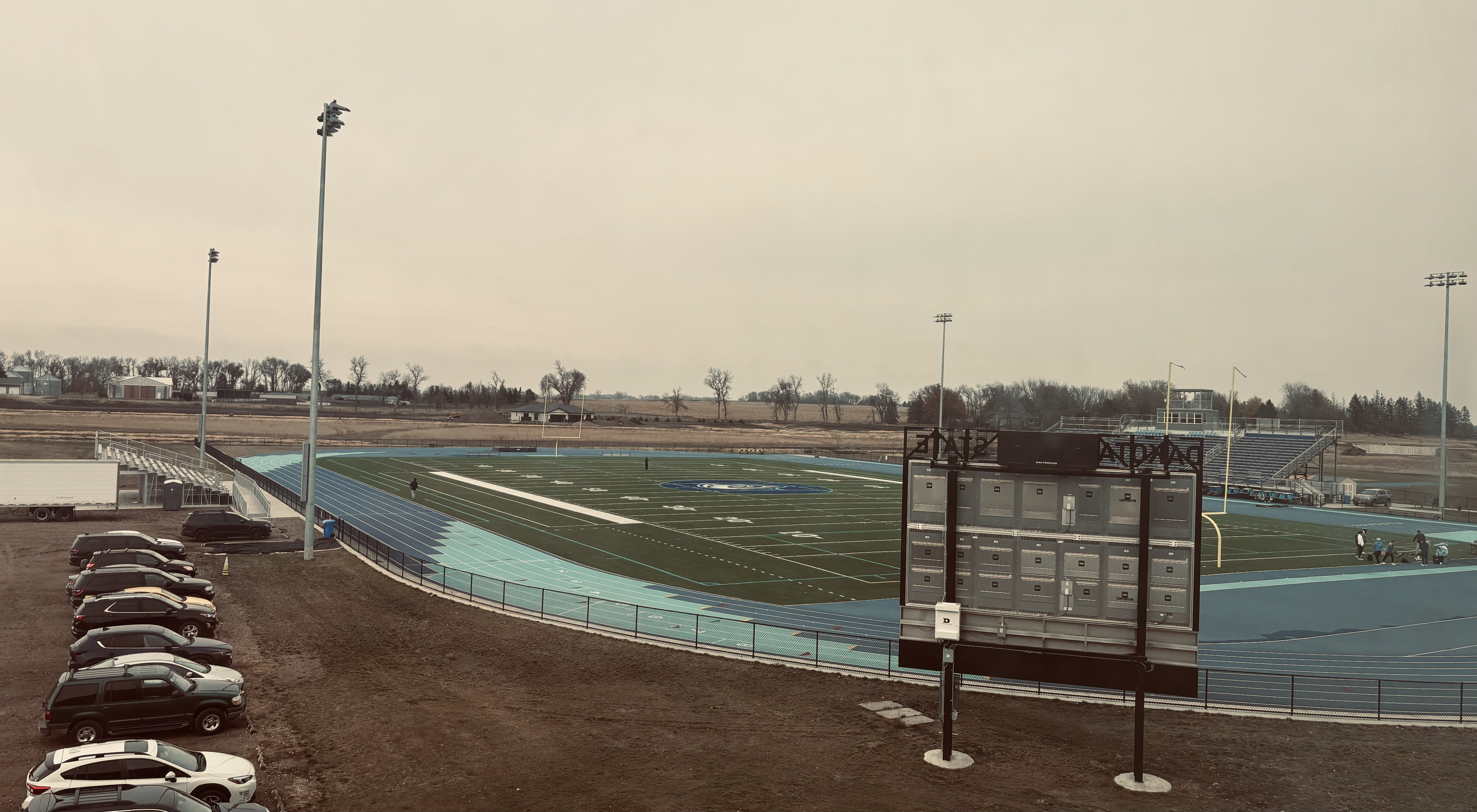
The Dan Beacom Track Complex is the home of the Dakota State Trojans track and field teams

SDIC championships

Team	Years
Men's Indoor (3)	1996, 1997, 1998
Women's Indoor (1)	1997
Men's Outdoor (2)	1996, 1997
Women's Outdoor (5)	1982, 1984, 1995, 1996, 1997

NSAA championships

Team	Years
Men's Indoor (6)	2019, 2020, 2022, 2023, 2024, 2025
Men's Outdoor (5)	2019, 2021, 2022, 2023, 2024

Frontier championships

Team	Years
Women's Outdoor (1)	2026

== National championships ==
=== Individual ===
==== Men's ====
Indoor

Name	Year	Event	Division
Andy Coy	2012	1000–meter run	NAIA

Outdoor

Name	Year	Event	Division
Conner Tordsen	2023	Discus	NAIA

==== Women's ====
Indoor

Name	Year	Event	Division
Desa Rae Doyle	2000	High Jump	NAIA

Outdoor

Name	Year	Event	Division
Casey Olson	2026	Javelin	NAIA

== Coaches ==
=== Current coaching staff ===
Position	Name	Alma mater
Head Coach	Alex Glover	Dakota Wesleyan University
Assistant Coach	Taylor Hauge	Dakota State University
Assistant Coach	Shandon Reitzell	Midland University
Assistant Coach	D'Artist Williams	Dakota State University
Graduate Assistant	Caleb Sayler	
Graduate Assistant	Zachary Haugen	

== See also ==
- Dakota State Trojans
