= Josh Anderson (American football) =

American football coach

Current position
- Title: Head coach
- Team: Dakota State
- Conference: Frontier
- Record: 79–106

Biographical details
- Born: Madison, South Dakota, U.S.
- Education: North Dakota State University

Playing career
- 1994–1995: Dakota State
- 1996–1998: North Dakota State
- Position: Tight end

Coaching career (HC unless noted)
- 1999–2000: Wayne State (NE) (assistant)
- 2001: North Dakota State (assistant)
- 2002: South Dakota State (assistant)
- 2003–2005: Chino Valley HS (AZ)
- 2006–2008: Payson HS (AZ)
- 2009–present: Dakota State

Head coaching record
- Overall: 79–106 (college); 34–30 (high school)

Accomplishments and honors

Championships
- AIA 3A (2008); AIA 3A East Region (2008)

Awards
- 2× All-SDIC (1994, 1995)

Josh Anderson is an American college football coach. He is the head football coach for Dakota State University, a position he has held since 2009.

== Early life ==
Anderson played college football for Dakota State and North Dakota State. He graduated from North Dakota State University with both a bachelor's degree and a master's degree.

== Coaching career ==
Following his playing career, Anderson served as an assistant coach for the Wayne State Wildcats from 1999 until 2000, then at North Dakota State in 2001, and finally at South Dakota State in 2002. He then served as the head football coach for Chino Valley High School from 2003 to 2005 and Payson High School from 2006 to 2008. In the 2008 season, Payson finished with a 14–0 record and won the Arizona Interscholastic Association 3A championship.

Anderson was hired as the next head coach of the Dakota State Trojans in 2009, replacing head coach Tom Shea. In 18 seasons, he has accumulated an overall record of 79–106.

== Dakota State Success ==
Anderson led Dakota State to an 8–3 record in 2017, when the Trojans finished No. 23 in the final NAIA coaches’ poll. The season completed the program's first stretch of four consecutive winning seasons since the 1970s. In 2025, Dakota State finished 8–2 overall and placed second in the Frontier Conference East Division with a 5–1 divisional record. The team, despite the great season, did not qualify for the playoffs in 2025.

== Head coaching record ==
=== College ===
Year	Team	Overall	Conference	Standing	Bowl/playoffs	NAIA^{#}
Dakota State Trojans (Dakota Athletic Conference) (2009–2010)
2009	Dakota State	2–7	2–6	7th		
2010	Dakota State	0–10	0–8	8th		
Dakota State Trojans (NAIA independent) (2011–2012)
2011	Dakota State	1–10				
2012	Dakota State	2–9				
Dakota State Trojans (North Star Athletic Association) (2013–2024)
2013	Dakota State	2–8	2–2	T–3rd		
2014	Dakota State	6–5	2–4	5th		
2015	Dakota State	6–5	4–2	T–2nd		
2016	Dakota State	6–4	3–3	T–3rd		
2017	Dakota State	8–3	6–2	2nd		23
2018	Dakota State	3–8	2–5	5th		
2019	Dakota State	5–5	3–4	4th		
2020	Dakota State	4–5	4–5	4th		
2021	Dakota State	6–4	5–3	T–3rd		
2022	Dakota State	6–4	4–2	T–2nd		
2023	Dakota State	1–9	1–7	5th		
2024	Dakota State	6–4	4–4	2nd		
Dakota State Trojans (Frontier Conference) (2025–present)
2025	Dakota State	8–2	5–1	2nd (East)		25
2026	Dakota State	7–4	3–3	T–4th (East)		
Dakota State:		79–106	50–61			
Total:		79–106				
National championship Conference title Conference division title or championship game berth

=== High school ===
Year	Team	Overall	Conference	Standing	Bowl/playoffs
Chino Valley Cougars (AIA 3A West) (2003–2005)
2003	Chino Valley	2–7			
2004	Chino Valley	2–7	0–5	6th	
2005	Chino Valley	4–6	1–5	6th	
Chino Valley:		8–20			
Payson Longhorns (AIA 3A East) (2006–2008)
2006	Payson	4–6	2–4	5th	
2007	Payson	8–4	2–3	3rd	
2008	Payson	14–0	5–0	1st	
Payson:		26–10	9–7		
Total:		34–30			
^{#}Rankings from final NAIA poll.
