= Trojan Field =

Sports venue in Madison, SD, US (1968–2022)

- Interactive map of Trojan Field
- Location: 1302 N Washington Ave. Madison, SD 57042
- Coordinates: 44.018503°N 97.106847°W
- Owner: Dakota State University
- Operator: Dakota State University

Construction
- Opened: 1968
- Closed: 2022

Tenant
- Dakota State Trojans (1968–2022)

Trojan Field was an American football field located in Madison, South Dakota owned by Dakota State University. It served as the home field for the Dakota State Trojans from 1968 until 2022. The field was located at 1302 N Summit Ave., Madison, SD on the north side of Dakota State University's campus.

The 2022 season was the final one for Dakota State at Trojan Field. In their final home game of the season, the Trojans shut out the Waldorf Warriors by a score of 13–0. Following the 2022 season, Trojan Field was torn down and eventually replaced by Brian Kern Family Stadium.
