= Cory Miller (American football) =

American football coach (born c. 1981)

Current position
- Title: Head coach
- Team: Oklahoma Panhandle State
- Conference: SAC
- Record: 13–17

Biographical details
- Born: c. 1981 (age 44–45); Marshalltown, Iowa, U.S.
- Education: University of Northern Iowa (2005); Rockford University (2010)

Coaching career (HC unless noted)

Football
- 2000–2005: Northern Iowa (SA)
- 2006–2007: Southwest Minnesota State (GA)
- 2008–2009: Rockford (DB)
- 2010: MacMurray (ST/DB)
- 2011: Illinois College (ST/DB)
- 2012–2014: Briar Cliff (ST/DB)
- 2015–2018: Dakota State (DC/LB)
- 2019–2022: Minnesota State C&T
- 2023–present: Oklahoma Panhandle State

Tennis
- 2008–2009: Rockford

Head coaching record
- Overall: 13–17 (college); 16–11 (junior college)

Cory Miller (born c. 1981) is an American college football coach. He is the head football coach for Oklahoma Panhandle State University, a position he has held since 2023. He was the head football coach for Minnesota State Community and Technical College from 2019 to 2022. He also coached for Northern Iowa, Southwest Minnesota State, Rockford, MacMurray, Illinois College, Briar Cliff, and Dakota State.

== Head coaching record ==
=== College ===
Year	Team	Overall	Conference	Standing	Bowl/playoffs
Oklahoma Panhandle State Aggies (Sooner Athletic Conference) (2023–present)
2023	Oklahoma Panhandle State	5–5	4–4	5th	
2024	Oklahoma Panhandle State	5–5	4–4	5th	
2025	Oklahoma Panhandle State	3–7	2–6	7th	
2026	Oklahoma Panhandle State	0–0	0–0		
Oklahoma Panhandle State:		13–17	10–16		
Total:		13–17			

=== Junior college ===
Year	Team	Overall	Conference	Standing	Bowl/playoffs
Minnesota State C&T Spartans (Minnesota College Athletic Conference) (2019–2022)
2019	Minnesota State C&T	1–6	0–3	5th (West)	
2020–21	No team—COVID-19				
2021	Minnesota State C&T	6–4	3–4	T–4th	
2022	Minnesota State C&T	9–1	6–0	1st	
Minnesota State C&T:		16–11	9–7		
Total:		16–11			
National championship Conference title Conference division title or championship game berth
