= Dan Beacom Track Complex =

Sports facility in South Dakota, United States

Coordinates: 44°1′5″N 97°6′25″W

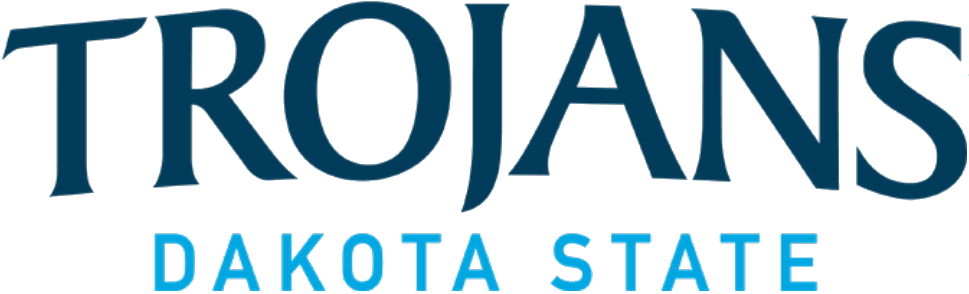

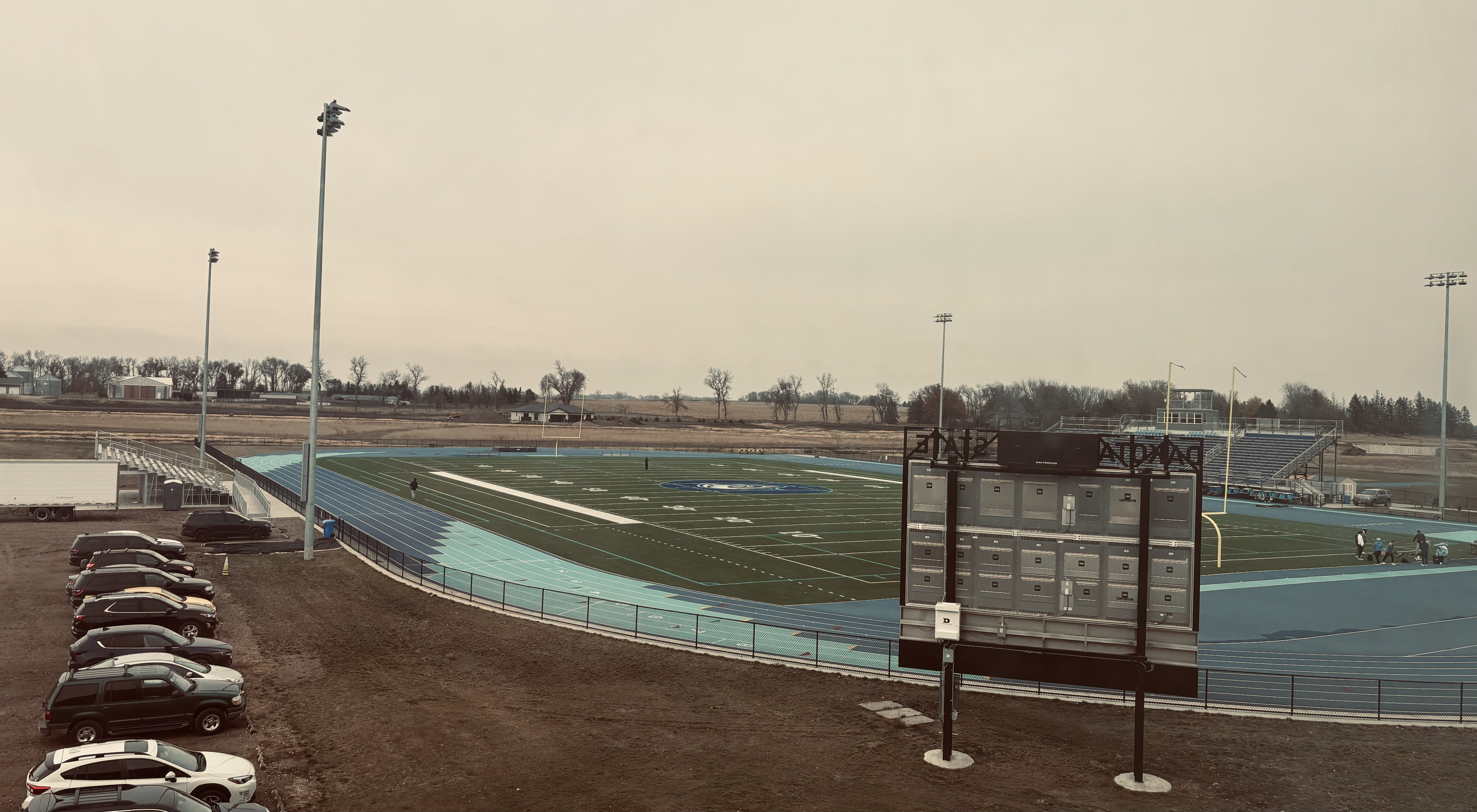
- View of the complex in 2024
- Interactive map of Dan Beacom Track Complex
- Address: Madison, SD; United States
- Owner: Dakota State University
- Operator: DSU Athletics
- Capacity: 1,800
- Type: Sports venue
- Current use: Track and field Soccer

Construction
- Architect: JLG Architects

Tenants
- Dakota State Trojans teams: track and field, soccer

Website
- dsuathletics.com/track-complex

The Dan Beacom Track Complex, also referred to as the Dan Beacom Track & Field, is a sports venue located on the campus of Dakota State University in Madison, South Dakota. The DBTC is composed of a running track and an American football field. It sits directly north of Brian Kern Family Stadium and northeast of the DSU Fieldhouse.

The venue is currently home to the Dakota State Trojans track and field and soccer teams. The stadium was also home to Dakota State's football team during the 2023 season while Brian Kern Family Stadium was being built. It features a Trojan blue eight-lane 400-meter polyurethane track that includes a steeple chase pit, a site for javelin, discus, and shot put, as well as a full sized synthetic turf soccer field. It has a seating capacity of 1,800.

== Namesake ==
The facility is named after Dan Beacom, a former track athlete at Dakota State who passed away on May 24, 2023. While on the Dakota State track team, he ran the 440, 880, two-mile relay, sprint medley relay, and the distance medley relay.
