= Presentation College, South Dakota =

Catholic college in Aberdeen, South Dakota, US

Coordinates: 45.48107°N 98.48789°W

Presentation College
- Type: Private college
- Established: 1951; 75 years ago
- Founder: Presentation Sisters
- Accreditation: HLC
- Religious affiliation: Roman Catholic
- Academic affiliations: ACCU; NAICU
- President: Paula Langteau
- Undergraduates: c. 800
- Location: Aberdeen, South Dakota (main campus), U.S.
- Campus: 100 acres (40 ha); Rural
- Colors: Green & Gold
- Nickname: Saints
- Sporting affiliations: NAIA – NSAA
- Mascot: Spirit the Saint Bernard
- Website: www.presentation.edu

Presentation College (PC) was a private Catholic college with its main campus in Aberdeen, South Dakota, United States, and a branch campus in Fairmont, Minnesota. The college, founded in 1951 and co-educational since 1968, enrolled about 800 students at its height in 2016. It took its name from the Sisters of the Presentation of the Blessed Virgin Mary (PBVM), the original sponsors. It grew out of their Notre Dame Junior College, founded in 1922 in Mitchell, South Dakota. The college closed on October 31, 2023 due to financial and enrollment challenges.

== Campus ==
PC was located on a 100-acre (40 ha) campus in Aberdeen, South Dakota. A branch campus existed in Fairmont, Minnesota. The college also offered instruction online.

== Academics ==
PC offered Bachelor of Science, Associate of Science, Associate of Arts, and certificate programs with a focus on health and medical-related programs.

== Athletics ==
The Presentation athletic teams were called the Saints. The college was a member of the National Association of Intercollegiate Athletics (NAIA), primarily competing in the North Star Athletic Association (NSAA) as a founding member since the 2013–14 academic year. The Saints previously competed as an NCAA D-III Independent during the 2012–13 school year; as well as a member in the Upper Midwest Athletic Conference (UMAC) of the NCAA Division III ranks from 2002–03 to 2011–12.

Presentation competed in ten intercollegiate varsity sports: Men's sports include baseball, basketball, cross country, football and soccer; while women's sports include basketball, cross country, soccer, softball (fast-pitch) and volleyball. Athletic scholarships were available to students.

== Notable alumni ==
- Nick Fosness ― politician
