= Golden Eagle Field =

American football field in Aberdeen, South Dakota

Coordinates: 45°26′26″N 98°27′18″W

Golden Eagle Field, formerly known as Swisher Field, is an American football field located in Aberdeen, South Dakota. It is part of the Brownell Activities Complex on the campus of Aberdeen Central High School, who it is primarily used by. The complex seats about 6,000 people, and features an eight-lane all-weather outdoor track that surrounds the field. It also includes locker rooms, training room areas, concessions, and a tailgate area.

== Renovations ==
In 2012, the NSU Kids Zone was made and includes inflatables plus other activities. It is sponsored by RDO Equipment and ran by the HPER department in the NSU School of Education.

In 2018, the turf was replaced and a new video board and scoreboard were added.

== Clark Swisher ==
Clark Swisher was a football and basketball coach at Northern State University. His record at Northern State was 146–42–4 in football and 95–88 in basketball. He won 15 South Dakota Intercollegiate Conference (SDIC) championships. Swisher Field was dedicated to him on September 10, 1976.
