= Joe Quintal Field =

Sports venue in Mitchell, SD, US (1943–present)

- Interactive map of Joe Quintal Field
- Location: 501–599 E 11th Ave. Mitchell, SD 57301
- Coordinates: 43.7191°N 98.0191°W
- Owner: Mitchell High School

Construction
- Opened: 1943

Tenants
- Dakota Wesleyan Tigers (1943–present); Mitchell High School (1943–present)

Joe Quintal Field is an American football stadium located in Mitchell, South Dakota. It has been home to the football teams from Dakota Wesleyan University and Mitchell High School since its construction in 1943. It is located at 501–599 E 11th Ave. in Mitchell, South Dakota on the west side of Mitchell High School.

== Namesake ==
Arthur "Joe" Quintal was an athletic director and coach at Mitchell High School for 35 years.

Quintal attended Elk Point High School in Elk Point, South Dakota. While there he was a member of the school's 1917 football state championship team. He then attended the University of South Dakota and was a member of the school's football and baseball teams. After graduating, he briefly coached at Vermillion High School in Vermillion, South Dakota.

Quintal first moved to Mitchell, South Dakota and started coaching at Mitchell High School in 1926. While there, he led the school's basketball team to five state championships (1930, 1932, 1935, 1940, 1948).

He has been named to the South Dakota Sports Hall of Fame, South Dakota Basketball Hall of Fame, University of South Dakota Coyotes Hall of Fame, South Dakota Coaches Association Hall of Fame, and the South Dakota Basketball Coaches Hall of Fame.
