= Brian Kern Family Stadium =

Football stadium in Madison, South Dakota, U.S.

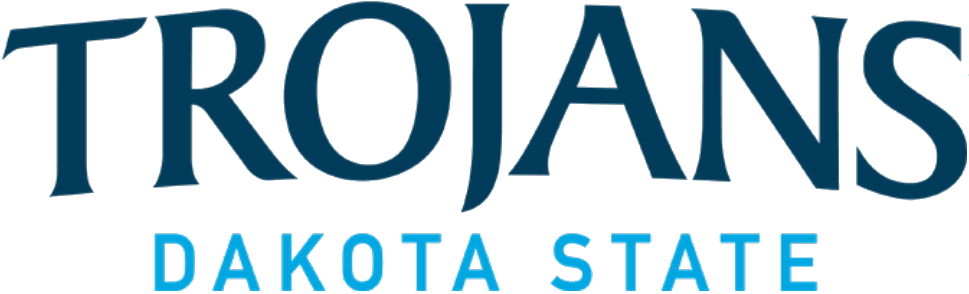

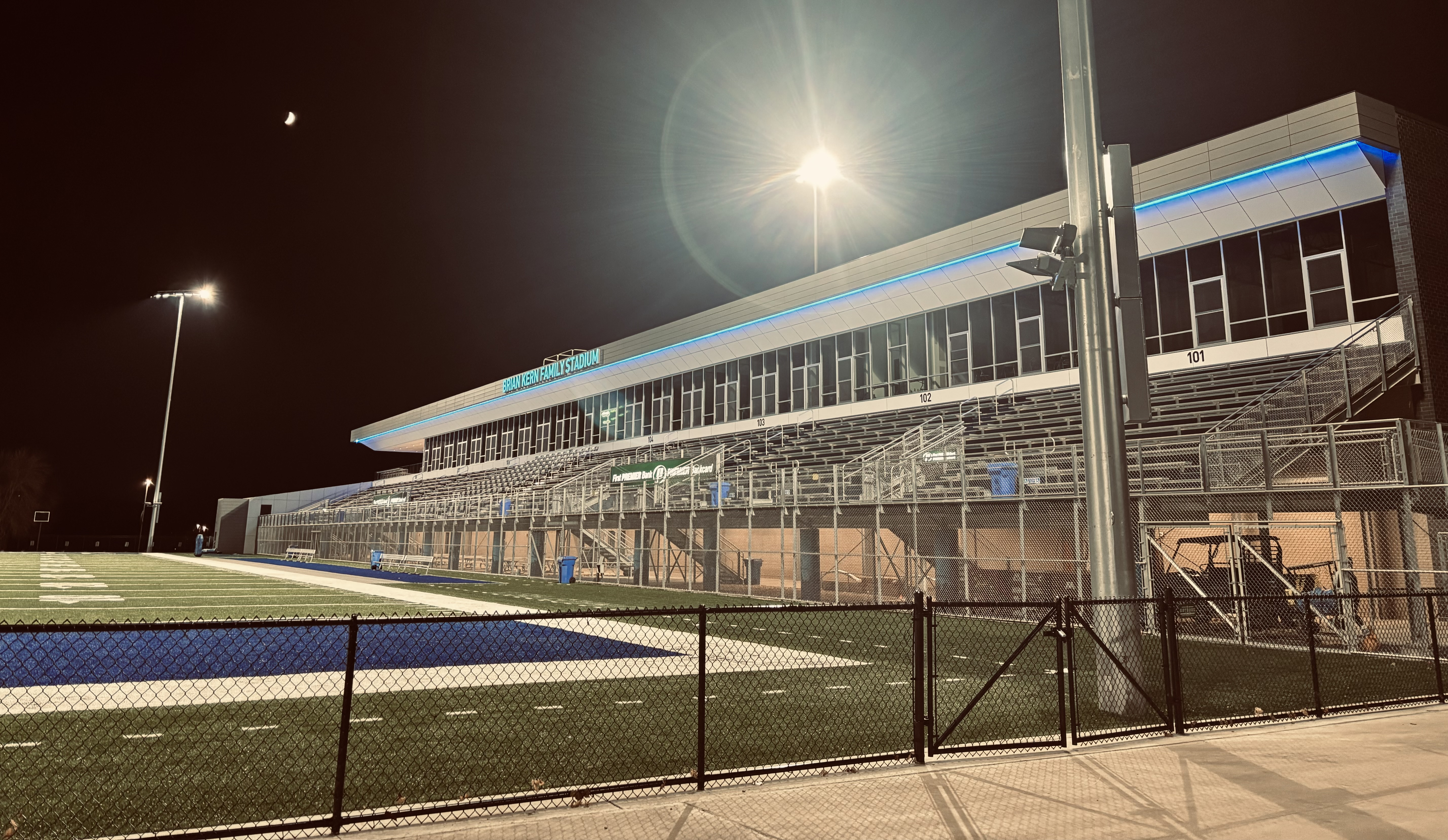
- Interior view of the stadium in 2024

- Location in the United States Location in South Dakota
- Interactive map of Brian Kern Family Stadium
- Address: 610 NE 11th Street; Madison, SD; United States
- Coordinates: 44°1′11″N 97°6′23″W
- Owner: Dakota State University
- Operator: DSU Athletics
- Capacity: 2,533
- Type: Stadium
- Record attendance: 2,202
- Current use: Football

Construction
- Opened: 2024; 2 years ago

Tenants
- Dakota State Trojans (NAIA) football (2024–present); Madison High School Bulldogs (SDHSAA) football (2024–present)

Website
- dsuathletics.com/brian-kern-family-stadium

Brian Kern Family Stadium is an American football stadium located in Madison, South Dakota. It is home to the Dakota State Trojans football team. The inaugural game was held on August 29, 2024, against Dakota Wesleyan University, in which the Trojans won by a score of 34–3. The stadium is also home to Madison High School's football team. It has a capacity of 2,533.

== Blankley Field ==
The field at Brian Kern Family Stadium is named Blankley Field. It is named after George Blankley, a former instructor, coach, and athletic director at Dakota State University.

== Beacom PREMIER Complex ==
Brian Kern Family Stadium is a part of the Beacom PREMIER Complex, which is a $41 million facility that also includes the Dan Beacom Track Complex. This is the first new athletic facility for Dakota State since 1960.

Brian Kern Family Stadium is home to the Dakota State Trojans football and esports team. The stadium includes a grandstand that can hold 1,800 people, an esports space, concessions, press boxes, athletic training room, locker room and an artificial turf field. The stadium was designed by JLG architects.

== Namesake ==
Brian Kern is a resident of Madison, South Dakota and the owner and president of Rosebud Wood Products. Kern attended Dakota State in the 1980s and has been a longtime supporter of the university. In his time at Dakota State he studied business administration and played football. His $5 million donation towards the stadium and the surrounding complex marked the largest donation by a member of the Madison community.

== Trojan Nights ==
Trojan Nights was an event to celebrate the opening of Brian Kern Family Stadium and the Beacom PREMIER Complex. It started with a concert held at Brian Kern Family Stadium on August 27, 2024, that featured Old Dominion, Brothers Osborne, and Elle King. The event concluded with the inaugural game against Dakota Wesleyan two days later.
