= North Star Athletic Association =

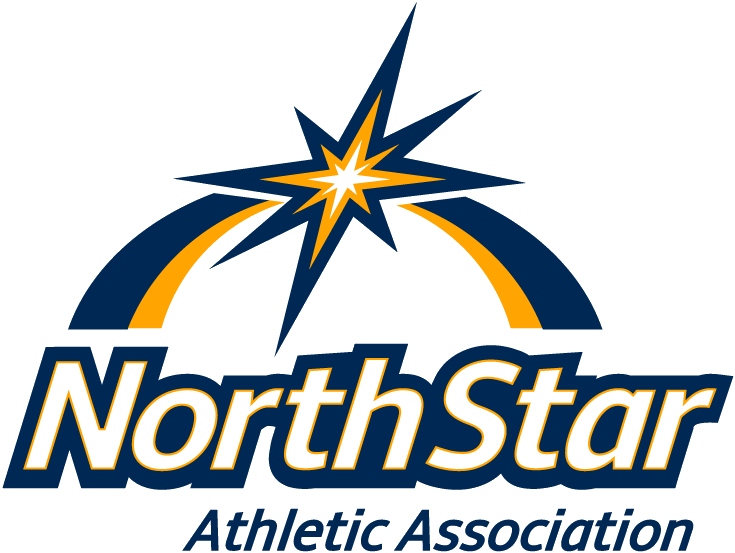
- Association: NAIA
- Founded: 2013
- Folded: 2025
- Commissioner: Roger Ternes
- Sports fielded: 18; men's: 9; women's: 9
- No. of teams: 6
- Headquarters: Jamestown, North Dakota
- Region: Midwest: The Dakotas, Nebraska
- Website: www.playnorthstar.com

Locations

The North Star Athletic Association (NSAA) was a college athletic conference affiliated with the National Association of Intercollegiate Athletics (NAIA) that began play in the 2013–14 school year. The conference disbanded with six full member institutions in Nebraska, North Dakota, and South Dakota. On December 28, 2023, the conference announced it would disband following the 2024–25 school year.

== History ==
North Star Athletic Association
Location of final NSAA members

=== Chronological timeline ===
- 2013 – The North Star Athletic Association (NSAA) was founded. Charter members included Dakota State University, the University of Jamestown, Mayville State University, Presentation College and Valley City State University, beginning the 2013–14 academic year.
- 2014 – Dickinson State University joined the NSAA in the 2014–15 academic year.
- 2014 – Waldorf University joined the NSAA as an affiliate member for football in the 2014 fall season (2014–15 academic year).
- 2015 – Bellevue University and Viterbo University joined the NSAA (along with Waldorf upgrading to join for all sports) in the 2015–16 academic year.
- 2015 – The University of Winnipeg joined the NSAA as an affiliate member for baseball in the 2016 spring season (2015–16 academic year).
- 2017 – Winnipeg left the NSAA as an affiliate member for baseball as the school dropped the sport after the 2017 spring season (2016–17 academic year).
- 2018 – Jamestown left the NSAA to join the Great Plains Athletic Conference (GPAC) after the 2017–18 academic year.
- 2021 – Iowa Wesleyan University joined the NSAA as an affiliate member for football and men's and women's track & field in the 2021–22 academic year.
- 2023 – Presentation (S.D.) left the NSAA as the school closed after the 2022–23 academic year.
- 2023 – Iowa Wesleyan left the NSAA as an affiliate member as the school closed after the 2022–23 academic year.
- 2024 – Waldorf left the NSAA to join the GPAC after the 2023–24 academic year.
- 2024 – Viterbo left the NSAA to join the Chicagoland Collegiate Athletic Conference (CCAC) after the 2023–24 academic year.
- 2024 – Jamestown rejoined the NSAA for the 2024–25 academic year.
- 2025 – The NSAA ceased operations as an athletic conference after the 2024–25 academic year; as many schools left to join their respective new home primary conferences beginning the 2025–26 academic year:
  - Jamestown transitioned to the NCAA Division II ranks and joined the Northern Sun Intercollegiate Conference (NSIC)
  - The remaining five schools (Bellevue, Dakota State, Mayville State and Valley City State; with Dickinson State rejoining) joined the Frontier Conference.

== Member schools ==
=== Final members ===
The NSAA had six full members at the time it was disbanded, with two of which being private schools:

Institution	Location	Founded	Affiliation	Enrollment	Nickname	Joined (Note: Represents the calendar year when fall sports competition begins.)	Colors	Subsequent conference(s)	Current conference
Bellevue University	Bellevue, Nebraska	1966	Nonsectarian	8,300	Bruins	2015		Frontier (2025–present)	
Dakota State University	Madison, South Dakota	1881	Public (Note: Part of the South Dakota Board of Regents System.)	3,307	Trojans	2013		Frontier (2025–present)	
Dickinson State University	Dickinson, North Dakota	1918	Public (Note: Part of the North Dakota University System.)	1,800	Blue Hawks	2014		Frontier (2025–present)	
University of Jamestown	Jamestown, North Dakota	1883	Presbyterian (PCUSA)	1,500	Jimmies	2013; (Note: Jamestown competed as a full member of the NSAA from 2013–14 to 2017–18.); 2024		Northern Sun (NSIC) (Note: Currently an NCAA Division II athletic conference.) (2025–present)	
Mayville State University	Mayville, North Dakota	1889	Public	1,130	Comets	2013		Frontier (2025–present)	
Valley City State University	Valley City, North Dakota	1890	Public	1,623	Vikings	2013		Frontier (2025–present)	

=== Former members ===
The NSAA had three former full members, all of which were private schools:

Institution	Location	Founded	Affiliation	Nickname	Joined (Note: Represents the calendar year when fall sports competition begins.)	Left (Note: Represents the calendar year when spring sports competition end.)	Subsequent conference	Current conference
Presentation College	Aberdeen, South Dakota	1922	Catholic (P.B.V.M.)	Saints	2013	2023	Closed in 2023	
Viterbo University	La Crosse, Wisconsin	1923	Catholic (Franciscan)	V-Hawks	2015	2024	Chicagoland (CCAC) (2024–present)	
Waldorf University	Forest City, Iowa	1903	For-profit (Note: Formerly affiliated with the Evangelical Lutheran Church in America (ELCA) until 2010.)	Warriors	2015 (Note: Waldorf competed in the NSAA as an affiliate member for football only during the 2014 fall season (2014–15 school year); before becoming a full member, effective the 2015–16 school year.)	2024	Great Plains (GPAC) (2024–present)	

=== Former affiliate members ===
The NSAA had three former affiliate members, one was a public school and the other two were private:

Institution	Location	Founded	Affiliation	Nickname	Joined (Note: Represents the calendar year when fall sports competition begins.)	Left (Note: Represents the calendar year when spring sports competition end.)	NSAA sport	Current primary conference	Conference in former NSAA sport
Iowa Wesleyan University	Mount Pleasant, Iowa	1842	United Methodist	Tigers	2021	2023	football, men's track & field, women's track & field	Closed in 2023	
University of Winnipeg	Winnipeg, Manitoba	1871	Public	Wesmen	2015	2017	baseball	Canada West (CWUAA) (Note: Currently an U Sports (formerly the Canadian Interuniversity Sport (CIS)) athletic conference.)	dropped program
Waldorf University	Forest City, Iowa	1903	For-profit	Warriors	2014	2015 (Note: Waldorf became a full member of the NSAA from 2015–16 to 2023–24.)	football	Great Plains (GPAC)	

=== Membership timeline ===
Full member (all sports) Full member (non-football) Associate member (football-only) Associate member (other)

== Sports ==
The North Star Athletic Association fielded 18 sports (9 men's and 9 women's):

Conference sports
Sport	Men's	Women's
Baseball	✓	
Basketball	✓	✓
Cross Country	✓	✓
Football	✓	
Golf	✓	✓
Softball		✓
Track & Field - Indoor	✓	✓
Track & Field - Outdoor	✓	✓
Volleyball		✓

=== Men's sports ===
Men's sponsored sports by school
School	Baseball	Basketball	Cross country	Football	Golf	Track & field (indoor)	Track & field (outdoor)	Total NSAA Sports
Bellevue	✓	✓	✓	✗	✓	✓	✓	6
Dakota State	✓	✓	✓	✓	✓	✓	✓	7
Dickinson State	✓	✓	✓	✓	✓	✓	✓	7
Jamestown	✓	✓	✓	✓	✓	✓	✓	7
Mayville State	✓	✓	✗	✓	✓	✗	✗	4
Valley City State	✓	✓	✓	✓	✓	✓	✓	7
Totals	6	6	5	5	6	5	5	38

Men's varsity sports not sponsored by the North Star Athletic Association which were played by NSAA schools

School	Hockey	Soccer	Volleyball	Wrestling
Bellevue	—	CAC	—	—
Dickinson State	—	—	—	HAAC
Jamestown	ACHA	CAC	IND	KCAC

=== Women's sports ===
Women's sponsored sports by school
School	Basketball	Cross country	Golf	Softball	Track & field (indoor)	Track & field (outdoor)	Volleyball	Total NSAA Sports
Bellevue	✓	✓	✓	✓	✓	✓	✓	7
Dakota State	✓	✓	✓	✓	✓	✓	✓	7
Dickinson State	✓	✓	✓	✓	✓	✓	✓	7
Jamestown	✓	✓	✓	✓	✓	✓	✓	7
Mayville State	✓	✗	✓	✓	✗	✗	✓	4
Valley City State	✓	✓	✓	✓	✓	✓	✓	7
Totals	6	5	6	6	5	5	6	39

Women's varsity sports not sponsored by the North Star Athletic Association which were played by NSAA schools

School	Hockey	Soccer	Swimming	Wrestling
Bellevue	—	CAC	—	—
Dickinson State	—	—	—	HAAC
Jamestown	ACHA	CAC	KCAC	

== Conference Championships ==
=== Football ===
NSAA championships won or shared per school

School	Conference	
School	Titles	Last Title
Dickinson State	10	2024
Valley City State	2	2014
Jamestown	1	2013

NSAA all-time standings (2013–2024)

School	W	L	T	Pct
Dickinson State	75	4	0	.949
Valley City State	52	29	0	.642
Waldorf	38	33	0	.535
Dakota State	40	42	0	.488
Jamestown	15	23	0	.395
Iowa Wesleyan	3	9	0	.250
Presentation	15	52	0	.224
Mayville State	17	63	0	.213

NSAA champions by year

Year	School	Record
2013	Valley City State; Jamestown	3–1
2014	Valley City State	6–0
2015	Dickinson State	5–1
2016	Dickinson State	6–0
2017	Dickinson State	8–0
2018	Dickinson State	6–1
2019	Dickinson State	6–1
2020	Dickinson State	9–0
2021	Dickinson State	8–0
2022	Dickinson State	6–0
2023	Dickinson State	8–0
2024	Dickinson State	8–0

=== Volleyball ===
NSAA championships per school

School	Conference		Tournament	
School	Titles	Last Title	Titles	Last Title
Viterbo	7	2023	8	2023
Bellevue	3	2024	1	2024
Jamestown	3	2024	2	2014
Dakota State	0	n/a	0	n/a
Mayville State	0	n/a	0	n/a
Dickinson State	0	n/a	0	n/a
Valley City State	0	n/a	0	n/a
Presentation	0	n/a	0	n/a
Waldorf	0	n/a	0	n/a

NSAA all-time standings (2013–2024)

School	Regular season			Tournament	
School	W	L	Pct	W	L
Jamestown	66	7	.904	8	4
Viterbo	102	20	.836	22	2
Bellevue	103	27	.792	13	9
Dakota State	86	69	.555	10	11
Mayville State	67	86	.438	6	11
Valley City State	66	89	.426	6	11
Presentation	40	92	.303	3	7
Dickinson State	38	107	.262	0	6
Waldorf	26	96	.213	0	5

NSAA regular season and tournament champions by year

Year	Regular season	Tournament
2013	Jamestown	
2014	Jamestown	
2015	Viterbo	
2016	Viterbo	
2017	Viterbo	
2018	vacated (Note: Viterbo was stripped of the 2018 volleyball regular season and tournament championships after a player was found to be ineligible.)	
2019	Viterbo	
2020	Bellevue	Viterbo
2021	Viterbo	
2022	Bellevue; Viterbo	Viterbo
2023	Viterbo	
2024	Jamestown; Bellevue	Bellevue

=== Men's basketball ===
NSAA championships won or shared per school

School	Conference		Tournament	
School	Titles	Last Title	Titles	Last Title
Bellevue	6	2023–24	4	2023–24
Jamestown	3	2016–17	1	2013–14
Dakota State	2	2015–16	2	2015–16
Mayville State	2	2022–23	4	2022–23
Dickinson State	2	2024–25	1	2024–25
Presentation	1	2018–19	0	n/a
Viterbo	1	2021–22	0	n/a
Valley City State	0	n/a	0	n/a
Waldorf	0	n/a	0	n/a

NSAA all-time standings (2013–14 to 2024–25)

School	Regular season			Tournament	
School	W	L	Pct	W	L
Jamestown	52	26	.667	7	5
Bellevue	90	49	.647	15	6
Dickinson State	85	67	.559	11	11
Mayville State	88	73	.547	16	7
Viterbo	65	56	.537	4	9
Valley City State	76	84	.475	5	12
Dakota State	76	85	.472	13	10
Waldorf	46	81	.362	3	9
Presentation	41	94	.304	2	8

NSAA regular season and tournament champions by year

Year	Regular season	Tournament
2013–14	Jamestown	
2014–15	Dakota State; Jamestown	Dakota State
2015–16	Dakota State	
2016–17	Bellevue; Dickinson State; Jamestown	Bellevue
2017–18	Bellevue	Mayville State
2018–19	Bellevue; Presentation	Mayville State
2019–20	Bellevue	Mayville State
2020–21	Mayville State	Bellevue
2021–22	Bellevue; Viterbo	Bellevue
2022–23	Mayville State	
2023–24	Bellevue	
2024–25	Dickinson State	

=== Women's basketball ===
NSAA championships won or shared per school

School	Conference		Tournament	
School	Titles	Last Title	Titles	Last Title
Dakota State	5	2024–25	3	2024–25
Jamestown	5	2017–18	3	2016–17
Mayville State	4	2023–24	4	2023–24
Bellevue	2	2019–20	1	2018–19
Valley City State	0	n/a	1	2017–18
Dickinson State	0	n/a	0	n/a
Presentation	0	n/a	0	n/a
Viterbo	0	n/a	0	n/a
Waldorf	0	n/a	0	n/a

NSAA all-time standings (2013–14 to 2024–25)

School	Regular season			Tournament	
School	W	L	Pct	W	L
Jamestown	66	11	.857	13	3
Mayville State	110	50	.701	18	8
Dakota State	102	58	.638	13	9
Bellevue	80	49	.620	10	8
Valley City State	99	61	.619	10	11
Dickinson State	60	91	.397	7	10
Viterbo	41	81	.336	3	9
Presentation	30	103	.226	1	9
Waldorf	20	104	.161	0	8

NSAA regular season and tournament champions by year

Year	Regular season	Tournament
2013–14	Jamestown; Mayville State	Mayville State
2014–15	Jamestown	
2015–16	Jamestown	
2016–17	Jamestown	
2017–18	Jamestown	Valley City State
2018–19	Bellevue; Mayville State	Bellevue
2019–20	Bellevue; Mayville State	Mayville State
2020–21	Dakota State	
2021–22	Dakota State	
2022–23	Dakota State	Mayville State
2023–24	Mayville State; Dakota State	Mayville State
2024–25	Dakota State	

=== Baseball ===
NSAA championships won or shared per school

School	Conference		Tournament	
School	Titles	Last Title	Titles	Last Title
Bellevue	7	2024	6	2024
Mayville State	2	2018	3	2021
Jamestown	2	2015	1	2014
Dakota State	0	n/a	0	n/a
Dickinson State	0	n/a	0	n/a
Presentation	0	n/a	0	n/a
Valley City State	0	n/a	0	n/a
Viterbo	0	n/a	0	n/a
Waldorf	0	n/a	0	n/a
Winnipeg	0	n/a	0	n/a

NSAA all-time standings (2014 to 2024) (Note: Dickinson State was a member of the Frontier Conference, which does not sponsor baseball, in 2014. The 2014 NSAA tournament, known that year as the NSAA/Frontier Tournament, included Dickinson State. Regular-season games against Dickinson State in 2014, are not counted as conference games and are excluded from the teams' regular-season records, since Dickinson State was not an NSAA member. However, 2014 conference tournament games involving Dickinson State are counted as tournament wins and losses, since Dickinson State was a tournament participant that year.)

School	Regular season			Tournament	
School	W	L	Pct	W	L
Bellevue	169	22	.885	29	4
Jamestown	77	26	.748	13	8
Mayville State	137	95	.591	28	16
Waldorf	103	92	.528	10	16
Valley City State	110	115	.489	16	20
Dakota State	105	127	.453	8	16
Dickinson State (Note: Dickinson State dropped their baseball program after the 2017-18 season, and then reinstated it for the 2020-21 season.)	71	111	.390	13	16
Viterbo	76	122	.384	4	14
Presentation	53	156	.254	4	13
Winnipeg	6	41	.128	0	0

NSAA regular season and tournament champions by year

Year	Regular season	Tournament
2014	Jamestown	
2015	Jamestown; Mayville State	Mayville State
2016	Bellevue	
2017	Bellevue	Mayville State
2018	Mayville State	Bellevue
2019	Bellevue	
2020	none (Note: The 2020 season was cancelled due to the COVID-19 pandemic.)	
2021	Bellevue	Mayville State
2022	Bellevue	
2023	Bellevue	
2024	Bellevue	

=== Softball ===
NSAA championships won or shared per school

School	Conference		Tournament	
School	Titles	Last Title	Titles	Last Title
Bellevue	4	2024	0	n/a
Valley City State	3	2021	3	2023
Jamestown	2	2018	1	2017
Dickinson State	1	2016	5 (Note: Total does not include 2014 NSAA/Frontier Tournament Championship when they were a member of the Frontier Conference.)	2024
Dakota State	0	n/a	0	n/a
Mayville State	0	n/a	0	n/a
Viterbo	0	n/a	0	n/a
Waldorf	0	n/a	0	n/a
Presentation	0	n/a	0	n/a

NSAA all-time standings (2014 to 2023) (Note: Dickinson State and Great Falls were members of the Frontier Conference, which does not sponsor softball, in 2014. The NSAA tournament, known that year as the NSAA/Frontier Tournament, included Dickinson State and Great Falls. Regular-season games against those two clubs in 2014, are not counted as conference games and are excluded from the teams' regular-season records, since they were not NSAA members. However, 2014 conference tournament games involving either Dickinson State or Great Falls are included as tournament wins and losses, since both teams were tournament participants that year.)

School	Regular season			Tournament	
School	W	L	Pct	W	L
Bellevue	146	38	.793	17	14
Jamestown	87	23	.791	14	9
Valley City State	152	55	.734	27	13
Dickinson State	132	66	.667	30	11
Mayville State	82	135	.378	9	16
Waldorf	59	116	.337	6	14
Dakota State	73	144	.336	8	16
Viterbo	59	126	.319	4	10
Presentation	66	153	.301	3	16
Great Falls (Note: Great Falls was never a member of the NSAA, but played in the 2014 NSAA/Frontier Tournament, since the Frontier does not sponsor softball. Their record in that tournament is included here.) (Note: University of Great Falls was renamed University of Providence in 2017-18.)	n/a	n/a	n/a	3	2

NSAA regular season and tournament champions by year

Year	Regular season	Tournament
2014	Valley City State	Dickinson State (Note: Dickinson State won the 2014 NSAA/Frontier Tournament as a member of the Frontier Conference. Dakota State finished the best out of all NSAA teams in the 2014 tournament as they finished third.)
2015	Jamestown	Dickinson State
2016	Dickinson State	
2017	Bellevue	Jamestown
2018	Jamestown	Dickinson State
2019	Valley City State	
2020	none (Note: The 2020 season was cancelled due to the COVID-19 pandemic.)	
2021	Valley City State	Dickinson State
2022	Bellevue	Valley City State
2023	Bellevue	Valley City State
2024	Bellevue	Dickinson State

=== Men's Indoor Track and Field ===
NSAA championships won or shared per school

School	Championships	
School	Titles	Last Title
Dakota State	6	2025
Dickinson State	5	2021

NSAA champions by year

Year	School
2015	Dickinson State
2016	Dickinson State
2017	Dickinson State
2018	Dickinson State
2019	Dakota State
2020	Dakota State
2021	Dickinson State
2022	Dakota State
2023	Dakota State
2024	Dakota State
2025	Dakota State

=== Women's Indoor Track and Field ===
NSAA championships won or shared per school

School	Championships	
School	Titles	Last Title
Dickinson State	7	2025
Jamestown	4	2018

NSAA champions by year

Year	School
2015	Jamestown
2016	Jamestown
2017	Jamestown
2018	Jamestown
2019	Dickinson State
2020	Dickinson State
2021	Dickinson State
2022	Dickinson State
2023	Dickinson State
2024	Dickinson State
2025	Dickinson State

=== Men's Outdoor Track and Field ===
NSAA championships won or shared per school

School	Championships	
School	Titles	Last Title
Dakota State	5	2024
Dickinson State	5	2025

NSAA champions by year

Year	School
2015	Dickinson State
2016	Dickinson State
2017	Dickinson State
2018	Dickinson State
2019	Dakota State
2020	No meet held due to COVID-19
2021	Dakota State
2022	Dakota State
2023	Dakota State
2024	Dakota State
2025	Dickinson State

=== Women's Outdoor Track and Field ===
NSAA championships won or shared per school

School	Championships	
School	Titles	Last Title
Dickinson State	9	2025
Jamestown	1	2016

NSAA champions by year

Year	School
2015	Dickinson State
2016	Jamestown
2017	Dickinson State
2018	Dickinson State
2019	Dickinson State
2020	No meet held due to COVID-19
2021	Dickinson State
2022	Dickinson State
2023	Dickinson State
2024	Dickinson State
2025	Dickinson State

=== Men's Cross Country ===
NSAA championships won or shared per school

School	Championships	
School	Titles	Last Title
Dakota State	6	2022
Dickinson State	4	2023
Bellevue	1	2024

NSAA champions by year

Year	School
2014	Dakota State
2015	Dickinson State
2016	Dickinson State
2017	Dickinson State
2018	Dakota State
2019	Dakota State
2020	Dakota State
2021	Dakota State
2022	Dakota State
2023	Dickinson State
2024	Bellevue

=== Women's Cross Country ===
NSAA championships won or shared per school

School	Championships	
School	Titles	Last Title
Dickinson State	7	2023
Dakota State	2	2024
Viterbo	2	2022
Jamestown	1	2014

NSAA champions by year

Year	School
2014	Jamestown
2015	Dickinson State
2016	Dickinson State
2017	Dickinson State
2018	Dickinson State
2019	Dickinson State; Dakota State
2020	Viterbo
2021	Dickinson State
2022	Viterbo
2023	Dickinson State
2024	Dakota State

=== Men's Golf ===
NSAA championships won or shared per school

School	Championships	
School	Titles	Last Title
Bellevue	8	2025
Jamestown	1	2018

NSAA champions by year

Year	School
2016	Bellevue
2017	Bellevue
2018	Jamestown
2019	Bellevue
2020	Not held due to COVID-19
2021	Bellevue
2022	Bellevue
2023	Bellevue
2024	Bellevue
2025	Bellevue

=== Women's Golf ===
NSAA championships won or shared per school

School	Championships	
School	Titles	Last Title
Bellevue	8	2025
Jamestown	1	2018

NSAA champions by year

Year	School
2016	Bellevue
2017	Bellevue
2018	Jamestown
2019	Bellevue
2020	Not held due to COVID-19
2021	Bellevue
2022	Bellevue
2023	Bellevue
2024	Bellevue
2025	Bellevue
