= Gary Buer =

American football coach

Biographical details
- Born: June 8, 1946

Playing career
- c. 1967: Minnesota–Morris
- Position: Defensive end

Coaching career (HC unless noted)

Football
- 1972: St. Cloud State (DC)
- 1973: Dakota State (DE/LB)
- 1974–1975: Minnesota–Morris (assistant)
- 1976: BYU (GA/JV)
- 1977–1978: Dakota State
- 1979–1992: Southwest State
- 1993–1996: Minnesota (assistant)
- 1997–2000: Marshall Senior HS (MN)
- 2001–2002: Sabino HS (AZ)
- 2003–2006: Southern Virginia
- 2007–2015: Independence HS (AZ)

Baseball
- 1976: Dakota State

Head coaching record
- Overall: 92–102–5 (college football)
- Tournaments: 0–1 (NAIA D-I playoffs)

Accomplishments and honors

Championships
- 2 SDIC (1977–1978); 1 NIC (1990)

Awards
- NIC Coach of the Year (1987)

Gary M. Buer (born June 8, 1946) is an American educator and former football coach. He served as the head football coach at Dakota State University in Madison, South Dakota in 1977 to 1978, Southwest State University—now known as Southwest Minnesota State University—in Marshall, Minnesota from 1979 to 1992, and Southern Virginia University in Buena Vista, Virginia from 2003 to 2006, compiling a career college football coaching record of 92–102–5.

== Playing career and military service ==
A native of Atwater, Minnesota, Buer graduated from the University of Minnesota Morris, where he played college football as a defensive end. In 1970, Buer enlisted in the United States Army, serving in South Vietnam.

== Coaching career ==
=== Early coaching career ===
After being honorably discharged from the Army, Buer worked as the defensive coordinator at St. Cloud State University in St. Cloud, Minnesota, where he earned a master's degree. In 1973, he was at Dakota State University in Madison, South Dakota. Buer then spent two years as an assistant at his alma mater, the University of Minnesota Morris, before returning to Dakota State in March 1976 as head baseball coach and defensive coordinator for the football team. By August 176, Buer has moved on to Brigham Young University (BYU) as a graduate assistant. With four other graduate assistants, he coached a junior varsity football team, while earning his doctorate in physical education and athletic administration.

=== Head coach at Dakota State ===
Buer's first head coaching position was at Dakota State. During his two seasons, the Trojans compiled a record of 18–2, and he was named NAIA District Coach of the Year and conference Coach of the Year in 1977 and 1978.

=== Minnesota ===
Buer coached at the University of Minnesota from 1993 to 1996 under Jim Wacker.

=== Southwest State University ===
Buer was head football coach at SSU (now Southwest Minnesota State University) from 1979 to 1992 and led the Mustangs from the bottom of the Northern Intercollegiate Conference (NIC; now Northern Sun Intercollegiate Conference) to one of the top teams in the National Association of Intercollegiate Athletics (NAIA); including a conference championship and two trips to the NAIA national playoffs.

The winningest coach in school history with a 70-69-5 record, Buer's 1987 squad qualified for the school's first NAIA Division I playoff appearance, while his 1990 team won the school's first-ever conference championship and advanced to the NAIA national playoffs. Possibly one of Buer's best teams was the 1991 squad that finished 9–1 overall, but a close loss to Moorhead State cost the team a conference title and a return trip to the NAIA playoffs.

During his tenure at SSU, Buer was named the Northern Intercollegiate Coach of the Year in 1987 and the NAIA District Coach of the Year in 1985, 1987 and 1990. He also served three years as the director of men's athletics at the university from May 1989 to August 1992.

=== Marshall Senior High School ===
Buer served as head football coach and activities director at Marshall Senior High School in Marshall, Minnesota, from 1997 to 2000.

=== Sabino High School ===
In 2001, Gary Buer was hired as head football coach at Sabino High School in Tanque Verde, Arizona. Sabino finished 5–5 in 2001 and 853 in 2002. Sabino won the league championship and made a state playoff appearance in 2002. In 2003, Buer left the Sabercats to build a new college football program at a small, private liberal arts college in Buena Vista, VA.

=== Southern Virginia ===
In 2003, Buer was named the first head football coach at Southern Virginia University in Buena Vista, Virginia. He helped to build the new football program and held that position for four seasons, from 2003 until 2006. His coaching record at Southern Virginia was 4–31.

=== Independence High School ===
Gary Buer was named head football coach at Independence High School in Glendale, Arizona, in 2007. In 2009, the Patriot football team won the Western Sky Region Championship, and Buer was voted Region "Coach of the Year" by his coaching peers.

== Head coaching record ==
=== College football ===
Year	Team	Overall	Conference	Standing	Bowl/playoffs	NAIA^{#}
Dakota State Trojans (South Dakota Intercollegiate Conference) (1977–1978)
1977	Dakota State	10–0	5–0	1st		6
1978	Dakota State	8–2	6–0	1st		T–20
Dakota State:		18–2	11–0			
Southwest State Mustangs (Northern / Northern Sun Intercollegiate Conference) (1979–1992)
1979	Southwest State	4–7	2–6	7th		
1980	Southwest State	3–6–1	2–5–1	6th		
1981	Southwest State	6–4	3–3	4th		
1982	Southwest State	2–7	2–4	T–4th		
1983	Southwest State	3–6–2	1–3–2	T–5th		
1984	Southwest State	3–7	0–6	7th		
1985	Southwest State	6–4	3–3	T–3rd		
1986	Southwest State	4–6	2–4	T–5th		
1987	Southwest State	7–4–1	4–1–1	2nd		14
1988	Southwest State	4–6	2–4	5th		
1989	Southwest State	5–5	4–2	T–2nd		
1990	Southwest State	8–3	5–1	T–1st	L NAIA Division I Quarterfinal	5
1991	Southwest State	9–1	5–1	2nd		9
1992	Southwest State	6–3–1	4–1–1	T–2nd		
Southwest State:		70–69–5	39–44–5			
Southern Virginia Knights (NAIA independent) (2003–2006)
2003	Southern Virginia	0–10				
2004	Southern Virginia	0–8				
2005	Southern Virginia	1–6				
2006	Southern Virginia	3–7				
Southern Virginia:		4–31				
Total:		92–102–5				
National championship Conference title Conference division title or championship game berth
