= Southern Virginia Knights =

- University: Southern Virginia University
- Nickname: Knights
- NCAA: Division III
- Conference: USA South (primary); CVC (men's volleyball); ODAC (men’s wrestling)
- Athletic director: Josh Monsen
- Location: Buena Vista, Virginia
- Varsity teams: 30 (14 men's, 13 women's, 3 co-ed)
- Football stadium: Knight Stadium
- Basketball arena: Knight Sports Arena
- Baseball stadium: Parry McCluer HS
- Softball stadium: Harvey-Dryden Field
- Soccer stadium: Knight Stadium
- Other venues: Stoddard Center
- Colors: Crimson and White
- Website: knightathletics.com
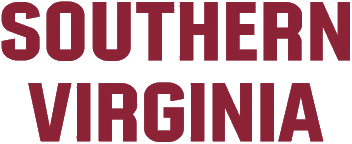

Team NCAA championships
- 1

The Southern Virginia Knights are the athletic teams that represent Southern Virginia University, located in Buena Vista, Virginia, in intercollegiate sports as a member of the Division III level of the National Collegiate Athletic Association (NCAA), primarily competing in the USA South Athletic Conference for most of its sports since the 2021–22 academic year; while its men's volleyball team competes in the Continental Volleyball Conference (CVC).

== History ==
SVU began its athletic program in the fall of 1997, one year after it became a four-year liberal arts college with an LDS environment. In 1998, the Knights joined both the National Association of Intercollegiate Athletics (NAIA), and also the United States Collegiate Athletic Association (USCAA) to compete in national tournaments. The 2012–13 school year was SVU's first year as a provisional NCAA Division III member; it joined the Capital Athletic Conference, now known as the Coast to Coast Athletic Conference, on July 1, 2013, and became eligible for conference championships in 2014–15. After four successful provisional years, the Knights became a full NCAA Division III member on September 1, 2016. On December 11, 2019, Southern Virginia announced it would join the USA South Athletic Conference, effective beginning in the 2021–22 academic year. Southern Virginia University officially joined the USA South on July 1, 2021.

Since the C2C never offered football under either of its names, Southern Virginia joined the New Jersey Athletic Conference for football effective July 2014. On August 9, 2017, Southern Virginia University officially changed its school colors from green and white back to its original colors of crimson and white. Two months later, on October 16, 2017, Southern Virginia University announced its football program would switch to the Old Dominion Athletic Conference starting in the 2019–20 season. On February 20, 2018, the men's volleyball team became the first Southern Virginia program to be nationally ranked, ranking in at number eight in the AVCA and NCAA D-III poll.

On July 12, 2018, Southern Virginia announced women's field hockey as a varsity sport becoming the 23rd varsity sport offered at the school. On April 4, 2019, Southern Virginia added men's rugby as a varsity sport to be offered. One week after announcing the addition of men's rugby, on April 11, 2019, Southern Virginia announced the addition of men's and women's swimming and diving. On August 16, 2022, came the announcement of adding women's wrestling. The newest sport added to Southern Virginia University was announced on October 3, 2024, with the addition of beach volleyball to start play in the Spring of 2025. Southern Virginia quietly discontinued its women’s field hockey team after the 2024 season due to multiple winless seasons.

== Sports sponsored ==
Men's sports	Women's sports
Baseball	Basketball
Basketball	Beach volleyball
Cross country	Cross country
Football	Golf
Golf	Lacrosse
Lacrosse	Soccer
Rugby	Softball
Soccer	Swimming & diving
Swimming & diving	Tennis
Tennis	Track & field^{†}
Track & field^{†}	Volleyball
Volleyball	Wrestling
Wrestling	
Co-ed sports
Cheer
Dance
Esports
† – Track and field includes both indoor and outdoor

A member of the USA South Athletic Conference, Southern Virginia University sponsors teams in fourteen men's, thirteen women's, and three co-ed varsity sports.

=== Women's basketball ===
- NCAA Division III women's basketball tournament appearances: 2022, 2024, 2025, 2026

The Southern Virginia women's basketball team won the 2021–22 USA South Athletic Conference tournament championship. In their first ever appearance in the NCAA Division III women's basketball tournament the Knights advanced to the Round of 32, where they fell to the Transylvania Pioneers 55–77.

=== Men's cross country ===
In 2021, the Southern Virginia men's cross country team won the USA South Athletic Conference Championship, beating runner up Berea College. Southern Virginia placed five runners in the top twenty individually. This was Southern Virginia's first ever conference championship as a member of the USA South Athletic Conference. Runner Dylan May won the individual conference championship for men and was named Runner of the Year, Rookie Runner of the Year, and First Team All-Conference. Head coach Kyle Chandler was named coach of the year.

Once again in 2022, the Southern Virginia men's cross country team won the USA South Athletic Conference Championship and runner Dylan May won the individual conference championship with runner Quin Meyer also earning a First Team All-Conference spot. Kyle Chandler was once again named coach of the year.

=== Women's cross country ===
In 2021, the Southern Virginia women's cross country team also won the USA South Athletic Conference Championship.

=== Men’s lacrosse ===
- NCAA Division III men's lacrosse tournament appearances: 2022

In 2022 the Knights won the 2022 USA South Conference tournament championship against Pfeiffer 13–11 to advance to their first ever NCAA Division III men's lacrosse tournament. The Knights would lose in the second round 8–18 against York.

=== Men’s soccer ===
- NCAA Division III men's soccer tournament appearances: 2026

In November of 2026 the Knights men’s soccer team won the 2026 USA South men’s soccer tournament.

=== Women’s soccer ===
- NCAA Division III women's soccer tournament appearances: 2023

In 2023 the Knights won the 2023 USA South Conference tournament championship against Brevard College 3–1 to advance to their first ever NCAA Division III women's soccer tournament. The Knights would lose in the first round 0–3 against New York University.

=== Men's tennis ===
- NCAA Division III men's tennis tournament appearances: 2021

In the 2020–21 season, the men's tennis team won their first ever conference championship as a member of the Coast to Coast Athletic Conference. The men's tennis team then went on to advance to the NCAA Final 8 before being eliminated.

=== Track and field ===
The Southern Virginia University men's and women's track team both won the USA South Conference Outdoor Track and Field Championships on April 21, 2022.

For the second year in a row, both the men's and women's track team won the 2023 USA South Conference Outdoor Track and Field Championships.

=== Men’s volleyball ===
- NCAA Division III men's volleyball tournament appearances: 2019, 2021, 2022, 2023, 2024, 2025, 2026

On March 30, 2019, the Southern Virginia Men's Volleyball team clinched the CVC regular season championship for the 2018–19 season. This was Southern Virginia's first ever conference championship as an NCAA Division III member. On April 13, 2019, Southern Virginia's men's volleyball program captured the university's first conference tournament title and first NCAA DIII Tournament appearance after defeating Juniata College in five sets.

On April 23, 2021, the Southern Virginia men's volleyball team lost in the NCAA Division III Final Four to Benedictine in five sets. This marks the longest a Southern Virginia team has lasted in the school's Division III era.

On April 15, 2022, the Southern Virginia men's volleyball team lost in the first round of the NCAA Division III men's volleyball tournament to Stevens.

On April 22, 2023, the Southern Virginia men's volleyball team lost in the quarterfinals of the NCAA Division III men's volleyball tournament to Vassar.

On April 28, 2025, the Knights swept Springfield at the Cregger Center in Salem, Virginia to win the 2025 NCAA Division III men's volleyball championship. It is the first NCAA championship in school history.

=== Women’s volleyball ===
- NCAA Division III women's volleyball tournament appearances: 2021, 2022, 2024, 2025

On November 6, 2021, the Southern Virginia Women's Volleyball team won the USA South Athletic Conference tournament championship for the 2021–22 season. This was Southern Virginia's first ever women's volleyball conference championship. In their first ever appearance in the NCAA Division III women's volleyball tournament, the Southern Virginia Women's Volleyball team lost 0–3 to Emory in the first round.

For the second year in a row the Southern Virginia Women's Volleyball team won the USA South Athletic Conference tournament championship for the 2022–23 season. They once again lost in the first round of the NCAA Division III women's volleyball tournament, this time too Carnegie Mellon.

=== Wrestling ===
In 2017–18 Nico Ramirez became the first NCAA National Qualifier in Southern Virginia's school history and made it to the second round of the NCAA Division III Wrestling Championships. Starting in the 2022–23 season, the wrestling program began competing in the Old Dominion Athletic Conference.

=== Classifications ===
Year	Division
1998–99 to 2012–13:	NAIA and USCAA
2013–14 to present:	NCAA Division III

=== Conference memberships ===
Year	Conference
1998–99 to 2012–13:	NAIA Independent/USCAA Ind.
2013–14 to 2020–21:	Capital Athletic Conference (Note: Currently known as the Coast to Coast Athletic Conference.)
2021–22 to present	USA South Athletic Conference

== National Championships ==
=== Team ===
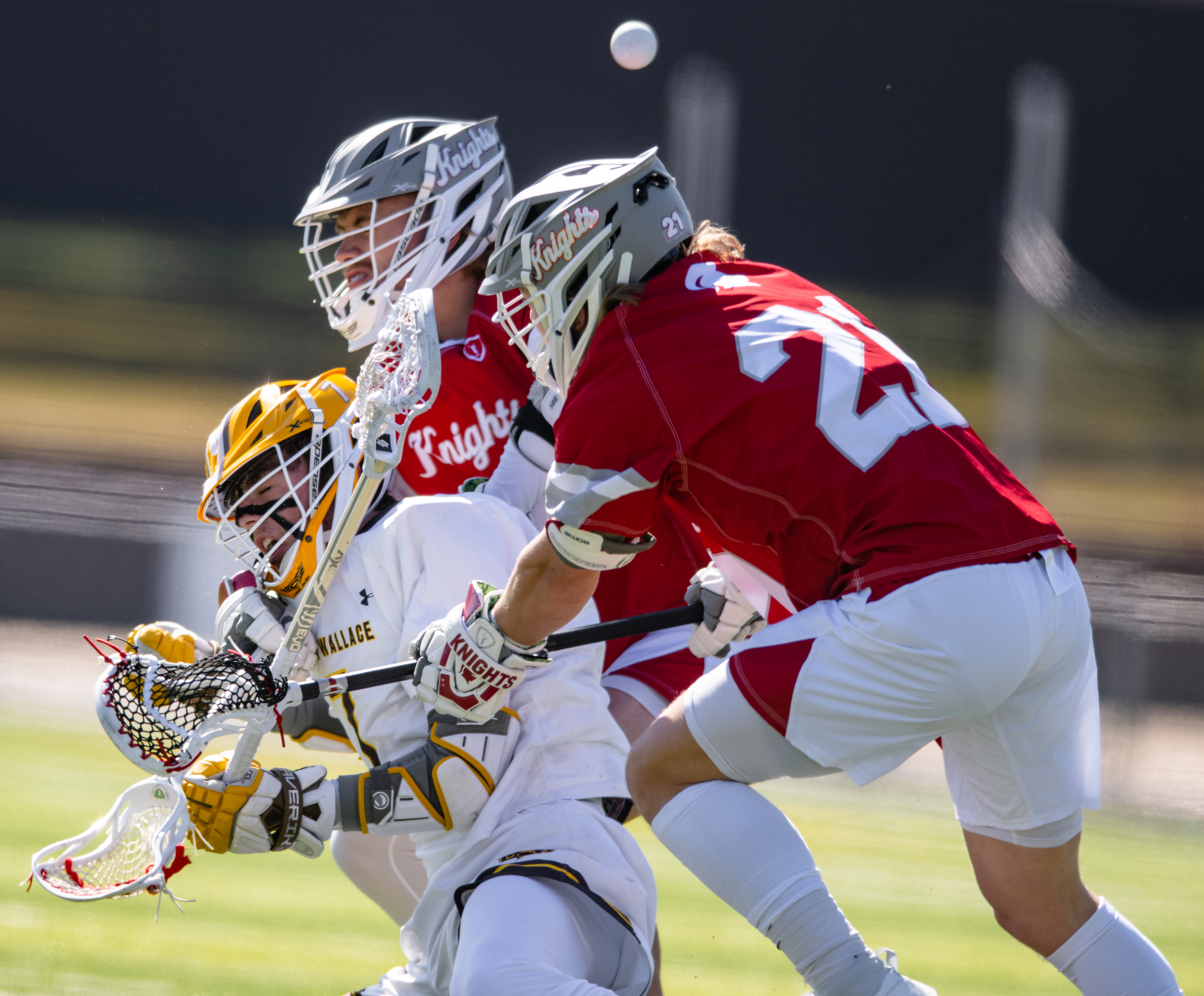
Two Knights men's lacrosse players take down a Baldwin Wallace Yellow Jackets player in 2023

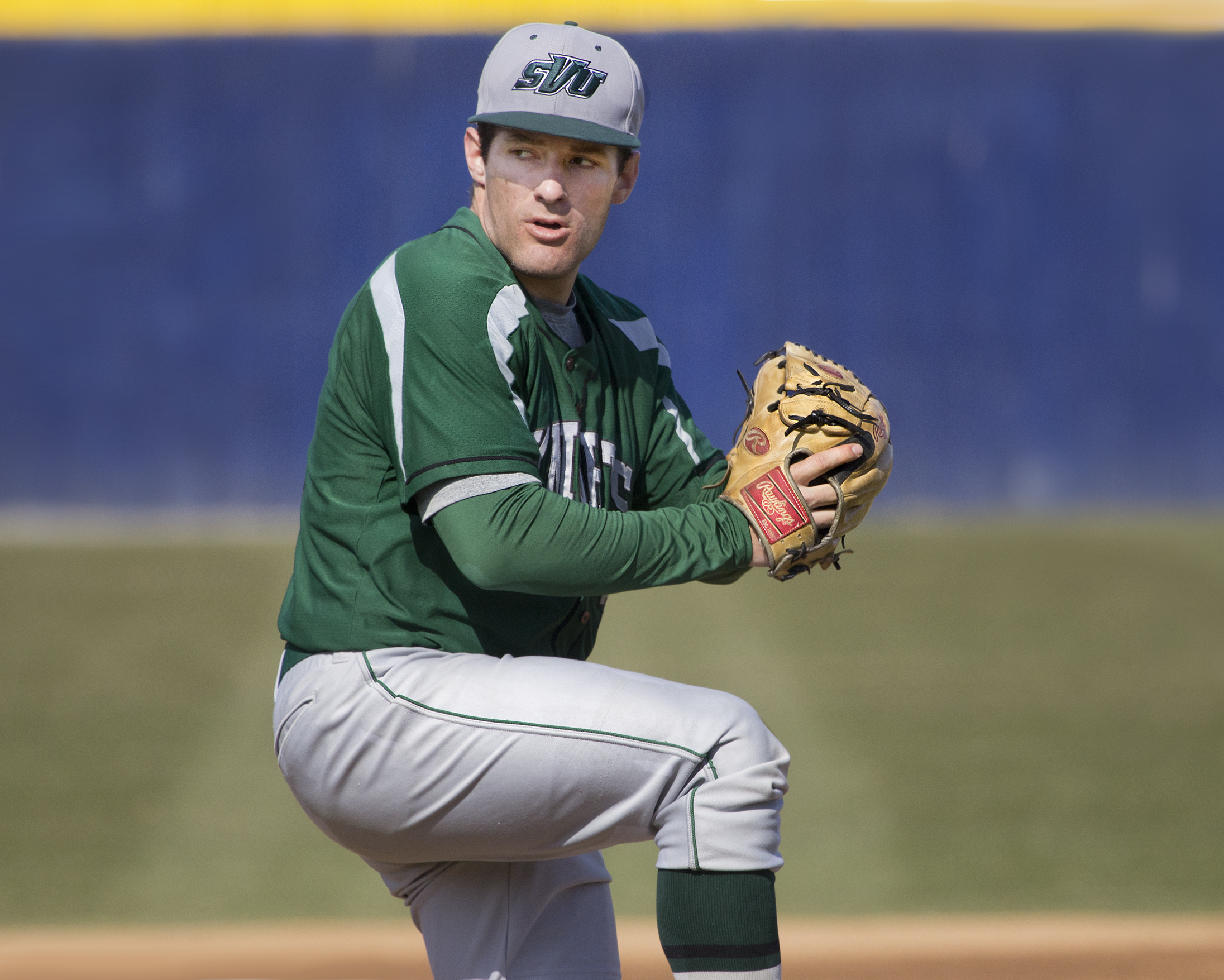
A Knights baseball player during a game in 2015, two years before the school's 2017 color change

Year	Athl. assoc.	Sport
1998	NSCAA	Women's soccer
1998	NSCAA	Women's cross country
1998	NSCAA	Men's cross country
1999	NSCAA	Softball
1999	NSCAA	Women's soccer
1999	NSCAA	Women's cross country
2000	NSCAA	Men's soccer
2000	NSCAA	Men's basketball
2001	NSCAA	Women's cross country
2001	USCAA	Men's soccer
2002	USCAA	Women's cross country
2002	USCAA	Women's volleyball
2002	USCAA	Women's track & field
2002	USCAA	Men's track & field
2002	USCAA	Women's basketball
2003	USCAA	Women's cross country
2003	USCAA	Women's track & field
2004	USCAA	Women's track & field
2004	USCAA	Women's volleyball
2004	USCAA	Women's cross country
2005	USCAA	Women's track & field
2005	USCAA	Women's soccer
2005	USCAA	Women's cross country
2006	USCAA	Women's basketball
2006	USCAA	Women's soccer
2006	USCAA	Women's cross country
2007	USCAA	Women's cross country
2008	USCAA	Women's soccer
2011	USCAA	Men's basketball
2011	USCAA	Women's cross country
2012	USCAA	Women's cross country
2025	NCAA	Men's volleyball

— (NCSAA) National Small College Athletic Association
— (USCAA) United States Collegiate Athletic Association
— (NCAA) National Collegiate Athletic Association

=== Individual ===
Year	Individual	Athl. assoc.	Sport
2000	Nate Casperson	NCWA	Wrestling (149lbs)
2001	Jessyca Barker	USCAA	Cross Country
2003	Kim Anderson	USCAA	Cross Country
2005	Kim Anderson	USCAA	Cross Country
2007	Grant Dean	USCAA	Golf
2008	Peter Rose	NWCA	Wrestling (157lbs)
2009	Peter Rose	NWCA	Wrestling (157lbs)
2010	Peter Rose	NWCA	Wrestling (157lbs)

== Facilities ==
Venue	Sport
Knight Stadium	Football; Soccer; Lacrosse; Field hockey
Knight Arena	Basketball; Volleyball; Wrestling
Parry McCluer High School (Note: Not owned by the university.)	Baseball
Harvey-Dryden Field	Softball
Tennis Complex	Tennis
Washington and Lee University	Track and field Swimming
Vista Links Course	Golf

== See also ==
- List of Southern Virginia Knights head football coaches
