= 1977 Dakota State Trojans football team =

American college football season

1977 Dakota State Trojans football

SDIC champion
- Conference: South Dakota Intercollegiate Conference
- Record: 10–0 (5–0 SDIC)
- Head coach: Gary Buer (1st season)
- Home stadium: Trojan Field

1977 South Dakota Intercollegiate Conference football standings
| | Conf. | | | | | Overall |
| Team | W | | L | | T | W | | L | | T |
|---|---|---|---|---|---|---|---|---|---|---|
| No. 6 Dakota State $ | 5 | – | 0 | – | 0 | 10 | – | 0 | – | 0 |
| South Dakota Tech | 4 | – | 1 | – | 0 | 6 | – | 3 | – | 0 |
| Black Hills State | 3 | – | 2 | – | 0 | 7 | – | 3 | – | 0 |
| Huron | 2 | – | 3 | – | 0 | 3 | – | 6 | – | 0 |
| Dakota Wesleyan | 1 | – | 4 | – | 0 | 5 | – | 5 | – | 0 |
| South Dakota–Springfield | 0 | – | 5 | – | 0 | 2 | – | 7 | – | 0 |
$ – Conference champion; Rankings from NAIA Division II poll

The 1977 Dakota State Trojans football team was an American football team that represented Dakota State University as a member of the South Dakota Intercollegiate Conference (SDIC) during the 1977 NAIA Division II football season. In their first year under head coach Gary Buer, the Trojans compiled a perfect 10–0 record (5–0 in conference games), won the SDIC championship, held every opponent to seven or fewer points, and outscored opponents by a total of 190 to 42.

The team played its home games at Trojan Field in Madison, South Dakota.

== Schedule ==
| Date | Opponent | Site | Result | Attendance | Source |
|---|---|---|---|---|---|
| September 3 | Northwestern (IA)* | Madison, SD | W 9–6 | | |
| September 10 | at Southwest State (MN)* | Marshall, MN | W 34–3 | | |
| September 17 | Wayne State (NE)* | Madison, SD | W 7–6 | | |
| September 24 | Black Hills State | Madison, SD | W 20–7 | | |
| October 1 | at Huron | Huron, SD | W 3–0 | | |
| October 8 | Northern State* | Madison, SD | W 21–0 | | |
| October 15 | South Dakota–Springfield | Madison, SD | W 23–7 | | |
| October 22 | at South Dakota Tech | Rapid City, SD | W 31–0 | | |
| October 29 | at Dakota Wesleyan | Kernel Stadium; Mitchell, SD | W 21–6 | | |
| November 5 | at Sioux Falls* | Howard Wood Field; Sioux Falls, SD | W 21–7 | | |
*Non-conference game
