= Glade Knight =

Member of the Church of Jesus Christ of Latter-day Saints

Glade Mac Knight
- Born: 1944 (age 81–82); Utah
- Education: Brigham Young University
- Occupation: Commercial Real Estate Sales
- Organization: Apple Hospitality REITs
- Title: Founder, Chairman
- Successor: Justin Knight, CEO
- Board member of: VCU Graduate School of Real Estate and Urban Land Development Advisory Board
- Spouse: Kathleen Knight
- Website: applehospitalityreit.com

Glade M. Knight (born 1944 in Utah) owns and operates multiple sources of income, including real estate investment trusts (REITs), corporate partnerships, and a large ranch with prize-winning horses. He is a patriarch for the Church of Jesus Christ of Latter-day Saints.

== Career ==
Knight is the chairman and CEO of Apple Suites Realty Group Inc. (founded 1999). Apple Hospitality is the corporate name of Apple Suites, and is the latest of 10 Apple programs. He has other investments, partnerships, and affiliations in the petroleum-based energy industry, as well as other real estate unrelated to Apple REITs.

=== Real Estate ===
Most recently, Glade Knight was the founder, chairman, and CEO of Apple REITs 7, 8, and 10 until they were merged into Apple Hospitality REITs. Knight also was the CEO of Apple Hospitality until 2014, when he gave the position to his son Justin Knight. Previous Apple-rooted REIT companies 2, 5, and 6 also were sold or merged with various other companies, after some time under Knight's Chairman- and-CEO-ship.

Each of the most recent ventures of the Apple program, which are outlets of franchised companies Hilton and Marriott brands, have brought in billions of dollars in profits for the realty group, plus money from liquid mergers or straight corporate purchases.

==== Controversy ====
There was an investigation of Apple REITs by the U.S. Securities and Exchange Commission (SEC) over violations (made from 2008 and 2011) that resulted in a grand total of nearly $1.7 million in personal and corporate fines. The investigation was covered in Investment News, (Note: Investment News http://www.investmentnews.com/article/20140213/FREE/140219946/bad-apple-reits-fined-1-5-million-for-disclosure-violations) Virginia Business, (Note: Virginia Business http://www.virginiabusiness.com/news/article/apple-reits-under-scrutiny1/313374) and New York Times. (Note: New York Times https://www.nytimes.com/2011/06/03/business/03norris.html)

=== Education ===
Glade Knight helped create BYU's Entrepreneurial Department of the Graduate School of Business Management and, he holds a position on the BYU National Advisory Council. He also holds numerous education positions in Virginia, including Member of the Graduate School of Real Estate and Urban Land Development Advisory Board at VCU and founder of Southern Virginia University, where he served as chairman from 1996 to 2015.

He has an honorary doctorate from SVU and both a BA and MBA (through the Marriott School of Management) from BYU. Knight created the Cowboy/Cowgirl Ethics Scholarship for SVU students. The award includes custom boots, a free trip to any of the ranches he owns, and $1000 to advance their education.

== Personal life ==
He is married to Kathleen Knight and has four adult children and 13 grandchildren. He has a close friendship with Bill Marriott.

He is a competitive horse racer, and he has ranches in Virginia and Texas. His Texas ranch has been awarded “Top Owner and Top Breeder, All Ages, All Divisions” twice.

He has at different times been called Elder Knight (as a missionary in England), Bishop, Stake President, and Patriarch [all followed by "Knight"] while officiating in his church callings as a member of the Church of Jesus Christ of Latter-day Saints.
