= Southern Virginia Knights football =

College football team

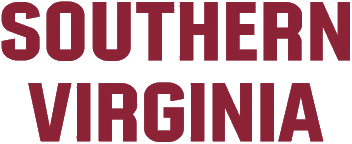
- First season: 2003; 23 years ago
- Athletic director: Josh Monsen
- Head coach: Vacant; 1st season, 0–0 (–)
- Location: Buena Vista, Virginia
- Stadium: Knight Stadium (capacity: 1,000; Record: 1,332)
- NCAA division: Division III
- Conference: USA South
- Colors: Crimson and White
- All-time record: 61–164 (.271)
- Outfitter: Nike
- Website: knightathletics.com

The Southern Virginia Knights football program is a college football team that represents Southern Virginia University in the NCAA Division III. They are a member of the USA South Athletic Conference. The team has had six head coaches since its first recorded football game in 2003.

== History ==
=== Classifications ===
Classifications
Year	Division
2003–2012:	NAIA
2013–present:	NCAA Division III

=== Conference Memberships ===
Conference Memberships
Year	Conference
2003–2012:	NAIA Independent
2013:	NCAA Division III Independent
2014–2018:	New Jersey Athletic Conference
2019–2020	Old Dominion Athletic Conference
2021–present	USA South Athletic Conference

== Notable games ==
- On August 30, 2008, Southern Virginia played Division I FCS Morehead State and lost 6–49.
- On September 5, 2009, Southern Virginia played Division I FCS Morehead State and lost 10–61.
- On August 30, 2012 Southern Virginia played Division I FCS Morehead State and lost 0–55.
- On October 4, 2014, Southern Virginia played its first New Jersey Athletic Conference game and lost in overtime against Kean University 28–27.
- On November 10, 2018 Southern Virginia played its last game as a member of the New Jersey Athletic Conference against The College of New Jersey and lost 33–30.
- On April 9, 2021, Southern Virginia defeated North Carolina Wesleyan College in a home game 28–21 after being down by 21 points with 10:43 left in the third quarter. It was the final game of the spring 2021 season that was affected by the COVID-19 and their final game as a member of the Old Dominion Athletic Conference.

== Seasons ==
Year	Head coach	Overall record	Conference record	Conference standing
NAIA independent (2003–2012)
2003	Gary Buer	0–10	N/A	N/A
2004	Gary Buer	0–9	N/A	N/A
2005	Gary Buer	2–8	N/A	N/A
2006	Gary Buer	2–8	N/A	N/A
2007	Michael Smith	6–5	N/A	N/A
2008	Michael Smith	3–8	N/A	N/A
2009	DeLane Fitzgerald	3–8	N/A	N/A
2010	DeLane Fitzgerald	4–7	N/A	N/A
2011	DeLane Fitzgerald	4–7	N/A	N/A
2012	DeLane Fitzgerald	5–6	N/A	N/A
NCAA Division III Independent (2013)
2013	DeLane Fitzgerald	8–2	N/A	N/A
New Jersey Athletic Conference (2014–2018)
2014	Jason Walker	1–9	1–6	T—7th of 8
2015	Jason Walker	0–10	0–9	10th of 10
2016	Joe DuPaix	2–8	1–8	T—9th of 10
2017	Joe DuPaix	2–8	1–8	9th of 10
2018	Edwin Mulitalo	3–7	2–7	8th of 10
Old Dominion Athletic Conference (2019–2020)
2019	Edwin Mulitalo	4–6	2–6	7th of 9
2020	Edwin Mulitalo	1–3	0–3	7th of 8
USA South Athletic Conference (2021–present)
2021	Edwin Mulitalo	2–8	1–7	8th of 9
2022	Edwin Mulitalo	1–9	1–6	8th of 9
2023	Joe DuPaix	1–9	1–6	8th of 9
2024	Joe DuPaix	1–9	1–7	T-7th of 9
2025	Joe DuPaix	6–4	3–4	5th of 8
Totals	22 seasons 6 coaches	61–164.271	14–77.154	3 conferences
