= Joe DuPaix =

American football coach

Biographical details
- Born: Salt Lake City, Utah, U.S.
- Education: Snow College (1995); Southern Utah University (1998)

Playing career
- 1994–1995: Snow
- 1996–1997: Southern Utah
- Position: Quarterback

Coaching career (HC unless noted)
- 1998: Missouri–Rolla (QB/WR)
- 1999–2000: Riverton HS (UT) (assistant)
- 2001–2003: Cal Poly (QB)
- 2004–2005: Cal Poly (co-OC/QB)
- 2006–2007: Cal Poly (OC/QB)
- 2008–2010: Navy (SB)
- 2011–2012: BYU (RB/RC)
- 2014: Timpanogos HS (UT)
- 2016–2017: Southern Virginia
- 2018–2022: Navy (SB)
- 2023–2025: Southern Virginia

Head coaching record
- Overall: 12–38 (college); 1–8 (high school)

Joe DuPaix is an American college football coach. He most recently served as the head football coach for Southern Virginia University, a position he held from 2016 to 2017 and from 2023 to 2025, when he announced to the team that he would be leaving for another opportunity. He was the head football coach for Timpanogos High School in 2014. He also coached for Missouri–Rolla, Riverton High School, Cal Poly, Navy, and BYU. He played college football for Snow and Southern Utah as a quarterback.

== Head coaching record ==
=== College ===
| Year | Team | Overall | Conference | Standing | Bowl/playoffs |
|---|---|---|---|---|---|
Southern Virginia Knights (New Jersey Athletic Conference) (2016–2017)
| 2016 | Southern Virginia | 2–8 | 1–8 | T–9th | |
| 2017 | Southern Virginia | 2–8 | 1–8 | 9th | |
Southern Virginia Knights (USA South Athletic Conference) (2023–2025)
| 2023 | Southern Virginia | 1–9 | 1–6 | 8th | |
| 2024 | Southern Virginia | 1–9 | 1–7 | T–7th | |
| 2025 | Southern Virginia | 6–4 | 3–4 | 5th | |
| Southern Virginia: | | 12–38 | 7–33 | | |
| Total: | | 12–38 | | | |

=== High school ===
| Year | Team | Overall | Conference | Standing | Bowl/playoffs |
|---|---|---|---|---|---|
Timpanogos Timberwolves () (2014)
| 2014 | Timpanogos | 1–8 | 0–6 | 7th | |
| Timpanogos: | | 1–8 | 0–6 | | |
| Total: | | 1–8 | | | |
