= Knight Stadium =

Multi-purpose stadium in Buena Vista, Virginia

- Interactive map of Knight Stadium
- Location: Buena Vista, Virginia 24416
- Coordinates: 37°44′32″N 79°20′19″W
- Owner: Southern Virginia University
- Operator: Southern Virginia University
- Capacity: 1,000
- Surface: Artificial Turf
- Record attendance: 1,332 (2019) (vs. Emory & Henry)

Construction
- Groundbreaking: 2016
- Opened: 2017

Tenant
- Southern Virginia Knights (NCAA) (2017–present)

Knight Stadium is a 1,000-seat multi-purpose stadium in Buena Vista, Virginia. It is home to the Southern Virginia University Knights football, soccer, and lacrosse teams.

== History ==
Knight Stadium broke ground in 2016. It opened in 2017. In 2018 the final touches were made with the addition of a knight statue.

== Knight Stadium Home Records ==
Home Records
| Year | Record |
| 2017 | 1-4 |
| 2018 | 1-4 |
| 2019 | 4-2 |
| 2020 | 1-1 |
| 2021 | 1-4 |
| 2022 | 0-5 |
| Totals; 4 Years | 8-20.286 |

== Knight Stadium Attendance ==
Attendance
| Year | Games | Total Attendance | Average Attendance | Highest Game Attendance | Lowest Game Attendance |
| 2017 | 5 | 3,810 | 762 | 1,078 | 442 |
| 2018 | 5 | 2,663 | 533 | 878 | 337 |
| 2019 | 6 | 4,685 | 781 | 1,332 | 386 |
| 2020 | 2 | 500 | 250 | 250 | 250 |

== Top 5 Attendances ==
Top 5 Attendances
| No. | Date | Opponent | Attendance |
| 1 | October 26, 2024 | North Carolina Wesleyan University | 1,500 |
| 2 | October 12, 2019 | Emory and Henry College | 1,332 |
| 3 | September 2, 2017 | Christopher Newport University | 1,078 |
| 4 | September 11, 2021 | Bridgewater College | 1,026 |
| 5 | October 7, 2017 | The Apprentice School | 945 |
