= John Madden =

American football coach and announcer (1936–2021)

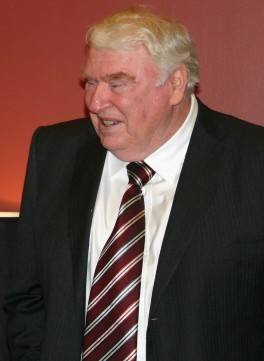
- Madden in 2007

Personal information
- Born: April 10, 1936; Austin, Minnesota, U.S.
- Died: December 28, 2021 (aged 85); Pleasanton, California, U.S.

Career information
- Position: Offensive tackle (No. 77)
- High school: Jefferson (Daly City, California)
- College: removed contradictory and inaccurate information
- NFL draft: 1958: 21st round, 244th overall pick

Career history

Playing
- Philadelphia Eagles (1959)*
- * Offseason or practice squad member only

Coaching
- Hancock (1960–1961) Offensive line coach; Hancock (1962–1963) Head coach; San Diego State (1964–1966) Defensive coordinator; Oakland Raiders (1967–1968) Linebackers coach; Oakland Raiders (1969–1978) Head coach

Awards and highlights
- Playing: Cal Poly Mustangs No. 74 retired; 1957 All-California Collegiate Athletic Association; 1959 All-American Bowl; Coaching: Super Bowl champion (XI); AFL champion (1967); PFW AFL Coach of the Year (1969)

Head coaching record
- Regular season: 103–32–7 (.750)
- Postseason: 9–7 (.563)
- Career: NFL: 112–39–7 (.731); College: 12–6 (.667)
- Coaching profile at Pro Football Reference
- Pro Football Hall of Fame

John Earl Madden (April 10, 1936 – December 28, 2021) was an American professional football coach and sports commentator in the National Football League (NFL). He was the head coach of the Oakland Raiders from 1969 to 1978, leading them to eight playoff appearances, seven division titles, seven AFL/AFC Championship Game appearances, and the franchise's first Super Bowl title in Super Bowl XI. Never having a losing season, Madden holds the highest winning percentage among NFL head coaches who coached at least 100 games. He is considered one of the greatest coaches of all time.

After retiring from coaching, Madden was a color commentator for NFL telecasts from 1979 to 2009 and won 16 Sports Emmy Awards. Madden appeared on all four major American television networks, providing commentary for games broadcast by CBS, Fox, ABC, and NBC. He also lent his name, expertise, and commentary to the Madden NFL video game series, which became the best-selling American football video game franchise. Madden was inducted to the Pro Football Hall of Fame in 2006.

== Early life ==
John Earl Madden was born in Austin, Minnesota, on April 10, 1936, the son of Earl Russell Madden (1905–1961) and Mary (née Flaherty) Madden (1917–2011). His father, an auto mechanic, moved the Madden family to Daly City, California, located south of San Francisco, when John was young. John attended Catholic parochial school with John Robinson at Our Lady of Perpetual Help, graduating in 1950, and then Jefferson High School, graduating in 1954. Madden was a caddie at the San Francisco Golf Club, which gave him college aspirations.

== Playing career ==
A football star in high school, Madden played one season at the College of San Mateo, in 1954, before he was given a football scholarship to the University of Oregon, studying pre-law, and playing football with childhood friend John Robinson. He was redshirted because of a knee injury and had a knee operation.

In 1955, he attended the College of San Mateo, then Grays Harbor College, playing in the fall of 1956, before transferring to Cal Poly in San Luis Obispo, where he played both offense and defense for the Mustangs in 1957 and 1958 while earning a Bachelor of Science in education in 1959 and then a Master of Arts in education in 1961. Madden's senior research project at Cal Poly focused on the use of weights to increase strides and speed in athletic training.

He won first-team all-conference honors at offensive tackle in his debut season at Cal Poly, and was a catcher on the Mustangs baseball team. Known amongst his teammates for his impressive downfield speed for a lineman, Madden also was selected by United Press International for Little All-Coast Second Team accolades following his junior season of 1957. During the 1957 season, Madden caught a pass from future fellow Pro Football Hall of Fame inductee, then-teammate and Cal Poly quarterback, Bobby Beathard.

Madden was drafted in the 21st round (244th overall) by the NFL's Philadelphia Eagles in 1958, months before beginning his senior season at Cal Poly. His senior year, which again saw Madden regularly start on the left side of the offensive line, was cut short due to a season-ending collarbone injury, suffered while making a tackle against Long Beach State in October 1958, with four games remaining on the schedule.

On January 3, 1959, Madden played in the All-American Bowl in Tucson, Arizona, and was later praised by Lou Pavlovich of The Sporting News for his play in the showcase. In August 1959, he suffered a torn knee ligament in his first training camp, during an Eagles scrimmage, ending his playing career without having had an opportunity to play in a regulation game professionally.

== Coaching career ==
=== College ===
Madden recounted how he became involved with coaching:

I got hurt in my rookie year with the Philadelphia Eagles—a knee injury—and I couldn't play. While I was rehabbing, Norm Van Brocklin would be watching films and would explain what was happening. I ended up with a degree in teaching and my love for football meshed with teaching.

In 1960, he became an assistant coach at Allan Hancock College in Santa Maria, California. He was promoted to head coach in 1962. Madden went 12–6 in two seasons, including an 8–1 mark in 1963, during which his Bulldogs were ranked No. 9 nationally among city colleges. Following the 1963 season, he was hired as a defensive assistant coach at San Diego State, where he served to 1966. During that final campaign, the 1966 Aztecs were ranked among the top small colleges in the country. While at San Diego State, Madden coached under Don Coryell, whom Madden credited as being an influence on his coaching.

=== Professional ===
Building on that success, Madden was hired by Al Davis as linebackers coach for the AFL's Oakland Raiders in 1967, putting him in the Sid Gillman coaching tree. He helped the team reach Super Bowl II that season. A year later, after Raiders head coach John Rauch resigned to take the same position with the Buffalo Bills, Madden was named the Raiders' head coach on February 4, 1969, becoming, at the age of 32, the AFL/NFL's youngest head coach to that time.

Madden's first Raiders squad went 12–1–1 in 1969 but lost 17–7 to the Kansas City Chiefs in the last-ever American Football League Championship Game. This would become a frustrating trend during Madden's coaching career. Oakland won seven AFC West division championships and always played to a winning record during his ten seasons as head coach, but they also lost in six AFL/AFC Championship Games.

One of the most frustrating playoff defeats came in 1972, when what appeared to be a last-minute AFC divisional round victory over the Steelers instead became a part of football lore, when Franco Harris' "Immaculate Reception" gave Pittsburgh a 13–7 win. In 1974, after knocking the two-time defending Super Bowl champion Miami Dolphins out of the playoffs in dramatic fashion, the Raiders again lost to the Steelers in the AFC Championship Game. The Steelers again ended the Raiders' season one game short of the Super Bowl in the 1975 AFC Championship Game.

In 1976, the Raiders went 13–1 in the regular season and escaped the first round of the playoffs with a dramatic and controversial 24–21 victory over the New England Patriots. In their third straight battle with the Steelers in the AFC Championship game, Madden's Raiders finally defeated their nemesis 24–7 to reach Super Bowl XI. On January 9, 1977, Madden won his first and only NFL title with a 32–14 win over the Minnesota Vikings.

The Raiders made the playoffs in 1977 as a Wild Card team, but again lost the AFC Championship Game, this time to the Denver Broncos. The Raiders enjoyed their tenth straight winning campaign under Madden in 1978 but failed to qualify for the playoffs for just the second time in his tenure. Soon after their season ended, Madden announced his retirement on January 4, 1979, due to a troublesome ulcer and occupational burnout, stating that he was permanently ending his coaching career.

Among Madden's accomplishments as a head coach were winning a Super Bowl, and becoming the youngest coach to reach 100 career regular-season victories, a record he compiled in only ten full seasons of coaching at the age of 42. Madden is still the coach with the most wins in Raiders history.

Madden never had a losing season as a head coach. His overall winning percentage, including playoff games, ranks second in league history behind Guy Chamberlin and is the highest among those who coached 100 games. Madden achieved his record while competing against coaching legends such as Tom Landry, Don Shula, Chuck Noll, and Bud Grant.

== Head coaching record ==
=== Junior college ===
Year	Team	Overall	Conference	Standing	Bowl/playoffs
Hancock Bulldogs (Central California Junior College Association) (1962–1963)
1962	Hancock	4–5	2–2	3rd	
1963	Hancock	8–1	4–0	1st	
Hancock:		12–6	6–2		
Total:		12–6			
National championship Conference title Conference division title or championship game berth

=== NFL ===
Team	Year	Regular season					Postseason			
Team	Year	Won	Lost	Ties	Win %	Finish	Won	Lost	Win %	Result
OAK	1969	12	1	1	.893	1st in AFL Western	1	1	.500	Lost to Kansas City Chiefs in AFL Championship Game
OAK	1970	8	4	2	.643	1st in AFC West	1	1	.500	Lost to Baltimore Colts in AFC Championship Game
OAK	1971	8	4	2	.643	2nd in AFC West	–	–	–	–
OAK	1972	10	3	1	.750	1st in AFC West	0	1	.000	Lost to Pittsburgh Steelers in Divisional Round
OAK	1973	9	4	1	.679	1st in AFC West	1	1	.500	Lost to Miami Dolphins in AFC Championship Game
OAK	1974	12	2	0	.857	1st in AFC West	1	1	.500	Lost to Pittsburgh Steelers in AFC Championship Game
OAK	1975	11	3	0	.786	1st in AFC West	1	1	.500	Lost to Pittsburgh Steelers in AFC Championship Game
OAK	1976	13	1	0	.929	1st in AFC West	3	0	1.000	Super Bowl XI champions
OAK	1977	11	3	0	.786	2nd in AFC West	1	1	.500	Lost to Denver Broncos in AFC Championship Game
OAK	1978	9	7	0	.563	2nd in AFC West	–	–	–	–
Total		103	32	7	.750		9	7	.563	

== Sportscasting career ==
=== Television ===
==== CBS Sports (1979–1993) ====
Madden joined CBS as a color commentator in 1979. After working lower-profile contests during his first years, he was elevated to CBS's top football broadcasting duo with Pat Summerall in 1981, replacing Tom Brookshier. Prior to teaming with Summerall on CBS, Madden was paired with a variety of announcers, such as Bob Costas, Vin Scully, Dick Stockton, Frank Glieber, and Gary Bender. The team of Madden and Summerall would go on to call eight Super Bowls together.

On occasions in which Summerall was unavailable (during the CBS years, Summerall was normally scheduled to commentate on the U.S. Open tennis tournament during the early weeks of the NFL season), Madden would team with the likes of Vin Scully and subsequently, Verne Lundquist. On their final CBS telecast together, the 1993 NFC Championship Game on January 23, 1994, Madden told Summerall that while CBS may no longer have the NFL, (Note: CBS regained NFL rights in 1998 by outbidding NBC for the rights to AFC telecasts.) at least they have the memories. On ABC's final Monday Night Football telecast in 2005, Madden used a similar choice of words.

==== Fox Sports (1994–2001) ====
In 1994, when Fox gained the rights to NFC games, leaving CBS without an NFL television deal, CBS employees became free agents. Madden was the biggest star in football broadcasting. Fox, ABC, and NBC made offers higher than the $2 million a year maximum for sportscaster salaries. NBC's owner General Electric (GE) offered to make Madden its "worldwide spokesman", and GE Rail would build him a luxury train. After he almost joined ABC, Madden and Summerall, along with Producer Bob Stenner and Director Sandy Grossman—known as the football broadcasting "A Team"—helped establish Fox's NFL coverage, Madden and that group gave Fox credibility to broadcast what Rupert Murdoch called "the crown jewel of all sports programming in the world". Madden's contract paid him more annually than any NFL player. Toward the end of his tenure, Fox was reportedly losing an estimated $4.4 billion on its NFL contract for the eight-year deal it signed in 1998, and it had been trying to cut programming costs as a result. Madden's Fox contract would have been worth $8 million for 2003.

==== ABC Sports (2002–2005) ====
In 2002, Madden became a commentator on ABC's Monday Night Football, working with longtime play-by-play announcer Al Michaels. Madden reportedly made $5 million per year.

==== NBC Sports (2006–2009) ====
In 2005, Dick Ebersol, president of NBC Sports, announced that Madden would provide color commentary for NBC's Sunday night NFL games, beginning with the 2006 season, making him the first sportscaster to have worked for all of the "Big Four" U.S. broadcast television networks. On October 13, 2008, NBC announced that Madden would not be traveling to the October 19 Sunday Night Football Seattle Seahawks–Tampa Bay Buccaneers game in Tampa, Florida, marking the end of Madden's 476-weekend streak of consecutive broadcast appearances. Madden, who traveled by bus, decided to take the week off because he had traveled from Jacksonville to San Diego, and would have had to go back to Florida before returning to his Northern California home.

Madden was replaced by Football Night in America studio analyst Cris Collinsworth for the game, and returned for the following telecast on November 2, 2008, in Indianapolis. Until 2010 the NFL did not schedule Sunday night games for one week in October, so as not to overlap with the World Series taking place roughly around the same time. Madden called his final game on February 1, 2009, for Super Bowl XLIII between the Arizona Cardinals and the Pittsburgh Steelers. Madden announced his retirement from the broadcasting booth on April 16, 2009. He was succeeded by Collinsworth.

=== Radio ===
In the 1970s, Madden got his start in broadcasting by calling in to longtime San Francisco radio personality "The Emperor" Gene Nelson's show on station KYA while coach of the Raiders. He followed Nelson when he moved to station KSFO, and the call-ins continued even after Madden's coaching retirement. Madden later made appearances on KNBR. In 1997, he began calling in to radio station KCBS five days a week at 8:15 a.m. Pacific Time. This continued to Thanksgiving 2015, when he ceased calling after heart surgery and other health concerns.

In 2017, he began making twice-weekly appearances on KCBS radio again, appearing Mondays and Fridays at 9:15 a.m. He stopped making regular radio call-ins in August 2018, citing a desire to remove any obligations from his schedule. KCBS named him "Senior Investigative At-Large Correspondent", indicating that he may occasionally call in again. Madden also aired sports commentaries in syndication on the Westwood One radio network in the United States.

=== Legacy ===
Madden's lively and flamboyant delivery won him critical acclaim and fourteen Sports Emmy Awards for standing Sports Event Analyst. His announcing style was punctuated with interjections such as "Boom!", "Whap!", "Bang!", and "Doink!"' and with his use of the telestrator, a device which allowed him to superimpose his light-penned diagrams of football plays over video footage. Madden's use of the telestrator helped to popularize the technology, which has become a staple of television coverage of all sports.

Madden was also known for working the annual Thanksgiving Day games for CBS and later Fox. He would award a turkey or turducken to the winning team. He awarded a turkey drumstick to players of the winning team following the Thanksgiving Day game, often bringing out a "nuclear turkey" with as many as eight drumsticks on it for the occasion. The drumsticks served as an odd take on the "player of the game" award. In 2002, Madden stopped announcing the Thanksgiving Day games after he moved to ABC, but the tradition continued. Fox, CBS, the NFL Network, and later NBC presented the Galloping Gobbler to the game's "Most Valuable" player until 2015.

Following his death, the NFL now honors Madden every Thanksgiving. Beginning in 2022, the entire tripleheader of games was dubbed the "John Madden Thanksgiving Celebration". A recording of Madden was played before each of the Thanksgiving games in 2022, and has continued since, along with the awarding of a "Madden Player of the Game" after each game, with NBC continuing on the tradition of awarding the turkey legs to its players of the game.

=== All-Madden team ===
Of all those players, I think Jack Youngblood...personified the All-Madden team spirit...

— John Madden

In 1984, Madden took the advice of NFL coach John Robinson—a friend of Madden since elementary school—and created the "All-Madden" team, a group of players who Madden thought represented football and played the game the way he thought it should be played. Madden continued to pick the All-Madden team to the 2001 season when he left to move to ABC and Monday Night Football. Madden added his "Hall of Fame" for his favorite players. He created a special 10th Anniversary All-Madden team in 1994, an All-Madden Super Bowl Team in 1997, and an All-Time All-Madden team in 2000. All Madden was the title of Madden's third best-selling book, after Hey, Wait A Minute? I Wrote a Book and One Knee Equals Two Feet.

In All Madden, Madden explained:

What does it mean to be "All-Madden"? It's a whole range of things. For defensive linemen and linebackers, it's about Jack Youngblood playing with a busted leg, Lawrence Taylor wreaking havoc on the offense and Reggie White making the other guy wish he put a little more in the collection plate at church. It's about a guy who's got a dirty uniform, mud on his face and grass in the ear hole of his helmet.

== Other media ==
=== Film ===
Madden was featured in the movie Little Giants. He also played himself as the broadcaster of the fictional games in the film The Replacements alongside his broadcast partner at the time Pat Summerall.

On December 25, 2021, the Fox network presented All Madden, a documentary highlighting Madden's rise to stardom as an NFL coach and broadcaster. Former and current NFL players appear in the film, which premiered prior to a Christmas Day contest on Fox between the Cleveland Browns and Green Bay Packers in Green Bay, just three days before his death. Following his death, Fox chose to re-air the documentary with a special encore presentation two days later on December 30. Various streaming platforms made the documentary available following the encore broadcast due to popular demand.

A biographical film, Madden, written and directed by David O. Russell and starring Nicolas Cage as Madden, debuted on Amazon Prime in November 2026.

=== Advertising and cameos ===
Madden appeared in a variety of radio and television commercials including Outback Steakhouse (the corporate sponsor of the Madden Cruiser), Verizon Wireless, Rent-A-Center, Miller Lite, Toyota, Sirius Satellite Radio, and "Tough Actin" Tinactin. In particular, the Miller beer advertisements cemented Madden's image in the public eye as a bumbling but lovable personality.

From 1987 to 2010, Madden was the spokesperson for Ace Hardware store. Madden would make appearances at several grand openings of local Ace Hardware stores all over the nation. His longtime broadcast partner Pat Summerall was spokesperson for Ace's competitor True Value.

Madden appeared in a 1999 episode of The Simpsons, "Sunday, Cruddy Sunday". In 1982, Madden hosted an episode of NBC's Saturday Night Live with musical guest Jennifer Holliday. In 2001, Madden was featured in U2's music video for the song "Stuck in a Moment You Can't Get Out Of". In 1972, he appeared in the video for Paul Simon's single "Me and Julio Down by the Schoolyard", in which he attempts to teach football fundamentals to a group of kids playing a pickup game.

To minimize travel to studios, Madden built Goal Line Productions in Pleasanton, California.

In 2008, Madden's endorsements for Ace Hardware, Outback Steakhouse, Verizon Wireless, Tinactin, and EA Sports equaled his NBC compensation, thus earning $19 million.

Madden refused Hawkins' offer to buy as much EA Sports stock, at the IPO price, as he wanted.

=== Madden NFL video games ===
From 1988 on, Madden lent his name, voice and creative input to the John Madden Football series of video games by Electronic Arts, later called Madden NFL. Entries in the series have consistently been best-sellers, to the extent that they have even spawned TV shows featuring competition between players of the games. Despite Madden's retirement as a broadcaster in 2009, he still continued to lend his name and provide creative input to the series, which were so popular that he became better known as the face of Madden to contemporary football fans than as a Super Bowl-winning coach and broadcaster, up until his death in 2021.

Madden viewed the game as an educational tool. During initial planning conversations with Electronic Arts founder Trip Hawkins in 1984, Madden envisioned the program as a tool for teaching and testing plays. He stated in 2012 that Madden NFL was "a way for people to learn the game [of football] and participate in the game at a pretty sophisticated level".

The EA Sports series continues to use his name, iconography and licence following his death, and announced on Madden Day, June 1, 2022, that all editions of Madden NFL 23 would feature Madden on the cover in tribute of his legacy, with the next gen version cover being a picture of Madden celebrating his victory as the head coach of the Oakland Raiders in Super Bowl XI, and the All Madden Edition cover being based on the cover of the series' 1st installment, John Madden Football.

== Awards and honors ==
NFL

- Super Bowl XI winner, as head coach of the Oakland Raiders

Broadcasting

- 16-time Emmy Award winner.
- 1984 NSMA National Sportscaster of the Year.
- Yahoo! Sports Top 50 All Time Network Television Sports Announcers (#2).
- 2002 Pete Rozelle Radio-Television Award winner.

Halls of Fame

- Cal Poly Mustangs Hall of Fame, class of 1987.
- Bay Area Sports Hall of Fame, class of 1991.
- Pro Football Hall of Fame, class of 2006.
- California Hall of Fame, class of 2009.
- 2010 NSMA Hall of Fame inductee.

Jersey Number Retirement

- Cal Poly, No. 74

== Personal life ==
=== Family ===
Madden met his wife, Virginia Fields, as students, in a bar in Pismo Beach, California. They married on December 26, 1959, at St. Mary of the Assumption Church in Santa Maria, California. Afterward, they lived in Pleasanton, California. Virginia was a pilot, owned her own airplane, and taught school "off and on" at Pleasanton Elementary School from 1966 to 1979, and operated The Village Saloon at Green's Store in Dublin, California. They had two sons, Joseph and Michael. Joe played football for the Brown Bears, later a film producer for The Cooler and John Madden's Goal Line Studios. Mike attended Harvard University, where he started as receiver on the football team, later a real estate developer, for John Madden's Red Bear Property Management. A grandson, Jesse, played defensive back for the Michigan Wolverines in the early 2020s and was hired as an assistant coach for the Washington Commanders in 2025.

=== Aversion to flying ===
Madden's aversion to flying was well known, although his fear was not realized until many years into his adult life. He had lost people close to him in the October 29, 1960, California Polytechnic State University football team plane crash that claimed the lives of 16 players, the team's student manager, and a football booster. In 1979, he had his first panic attack on a flight originating in Tampa, Florida. He never flew on a plane again. Madden stated once in an interview that his fears were not about turbulence, flying, or heights, but primarily claustrophobia.

During his appearance to host Saturday Night Live in the early 1980s, the show included a short film depicting Madden making the journey by train to New York City to host the show. In the mid-1980s, Madden was a frequent rider on Amtrak's Lake Shore Limited. Amtrak allowed Madden to use the dining car at any time.

Beginning in 1987, Greyhound Lines supplied Madden with a custom bus and drivers in exchange for advertising and speaking events, dubbed the Madden Cruiser. The Madden Cruiser shells were manufactured by Motor Coach Industries. The coach-bus sponsors over the years included Walker Advantage Muffler and Outback Steakhouse. In 2018, Madden donated the original Madden Cruiser to the Pro Football Hall of Fame, where it was restored to its original condition.

Madden never did commentary for the Pro Bowl, which was held in Honolulu every year of his broadcasting career. Likewise, Madden never called any preseason game held outside of North America, even when his play-by-play partner was on the telecast. Madden found an unexpected use for his bus in New York City after the September 11, 2001 attacks, when he provided transportation for former ice-skating champion Peggy Fleming, whose flight home to Los Gatos, California, had been grounded.

=== Philanthropy ===
In June 2016, Madden's bocce tournament, co-hosted with Steve Mariucci, raised $5 million for Special Olympics Northern California, the Juvenile Diabetes Research Foundation, and the Diabetes Youth Foundation. In 2021, Madden began funding six scholarships to his alma mater, Cal Poly, for students from various East Bay high schools.

In October 2022, Cal Poly and the Madden family announced that Madden had donated a leading contribution toward a new football-specific facility on campus. The facility, named the John Madden Football Center, furnished all-new lockers, strength and conditioning facilities, a nutrition center, offices, training rooms and a film-review theater for coaches, players and trainers. The total $45 million facility encompasses 29,000 square feet and opened in June 2026. The entrance is adjacent to the university's memorial for the 1960 airline crash victims, many of whom were Madden's friends.

=== Death ===
Madden died at his home in Pleasanton, California, on December 28, 2021, at the age of 85. John and Virginia's 62nd wedding anniversary was two days before.

== See also ==
- Bay Area Sports Hall of Fame
- Ghost to the Post – 1977 significant play
- Holy Roller (American football) – 1978 controversial play
- List of American Football League players
- List of NFL head coach wins leaders
- List of Super Bowl head coaches
- Madden Most Valuable Protectors Award
- The Sea of Hands – 1974 significant play

== Notes ==
Sporting positions
Preceded by Tom Brookshier	NFL on CBS lead game analyst 1981–1993	Succeeded by Phil Simms
Preceded by none	NFL on Fox lead game analyst 1994–2001	Succeeded by Troy Aikman and Cris Collinsworth
Preceded by Dan Fouts and Dennis Miller	Monday Night Football game analyst 2002–2005	Succeeded by Joe Theismann and Tony Kornheiser
Preceded by none	NBC Sunday Night Football game analyst 2006–2008	Succeeded by Cris Collinsworth
Preceded by Paul Maguire and Phil Simms	NFL on NBC lead game analyst 2006–2008	Succeeded by Cris Collinsworth
