= Michael Smith (American football coach) =

American football coach

Coaching career (HC unless noted)
- 1998–1999: Dixie HS (UT)
- 2000–2004: Copper Hills HS (UT)
- 2006: Southern Virginia (OC)
- 2007–2008: Southern Virginia

Head coaching record
- Overall: 9–13 (college)

Michael Smith is an American football coach. Smith was the head football coach at Southern Virginia University in Buena Vista, Virginia. He held that position for the 2007 and 2008 seasons. His coaching record at Southern Virginia was 9–13.

Smith served as Southern Virginia's offensive coordinator in 2006 after coaching high school football in Utah.
