= Jefferson High School (Daly City, California) =

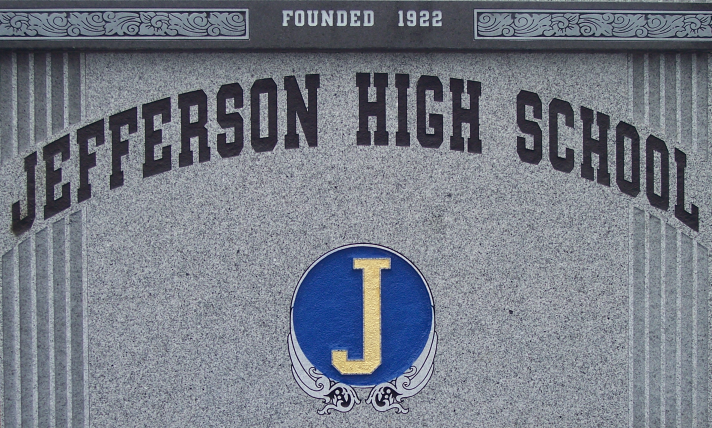

Location
- 6996 Mission Street; Daly City, California 94014; United States; 37°41′45″N 122°27′57″W

Information
- Type: Public high school
- Established: 1922
- School district: Jefferson Union High School District
- Principal: John Herrigan
- Teaching staff: 55.77 (FTE)
- Enrollment: 1,071 (2023–2024)
- Student to teacher ratio: 19.20
- Campus: Urban
- Colors: Blue, gold
- Mascot: Grizzlies
- Website: Official Website

Jefferson High School is an American public high school in Daly City, California, United States, and was the first school in the Jefferson Union High School District (JUHSD). Jefferson serves Daly City, Brisbane, Pacifica, and Colma.

== History ==
Daly City residents who formerly had to send their children to San Francisco high schools because of a lack of a local alternative voted into existence the Jefferson Union High School District in 1922. This resulted in the formation of Jefferson High School.

== Campus ==
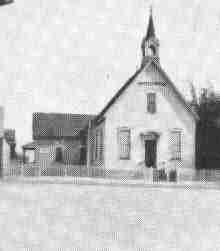
Old Jefferson Hall, circa 1922

Jefferson High School (JHS) opened in 1922 to its first 50 students using the old Jefferson Hall (previously Jefferson Elementary School) near San Pedro Road and Hill Street. Recognizing the need for a more suitable campus to accommodate the rapidly expanding student body, JUHSD residents voted to build a new campus at the current location in 1923.

The first building was finished in 1925. Subsequently, this building was demolished and replaced in 1963.

In 2000, alumnus John Madden donated the lighting for the campus football field. They are named "Madden Lights" in his honor.

In 2005, Jefferson began a project to renovate and remodel the campus.

In 2014, Jefferson High build new science classrooms

In 2025, Jefferson began a project to remodel the gym.

== Demographics ==
White	Latino	Asian	African American	Pacific Islander	American Indian	Two or More Races
3%	40%	47%	2%	1%	0.1%	6%

According to U.S. News & World Report, 97% of Jefferson's student body is "of color," with 50% of the student body coming from an economically disadvantaged household, determined by student eligibility for California's Reduced-price meal program.

== Academics ==
=== Curriculum ===
Jefferson offers Advanced Placement courses in US History, AP World History, Chemistry, Spanish Language and Culture, US Government, Language and Composition, Literature, Studio Art, and Calculus AB.

=== Standardized testing ===
SAT Scores for 2013–2014
	Critical Reading Average	Math Average	Writing Average
Jefferson High School	455	477	452
Jefferson Union District	503	536	500
San Mateo County	546	576	548
Statewide	492	506	489

== Extracurricular activities ==
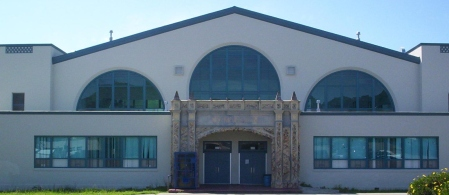
Gymnasium entrance

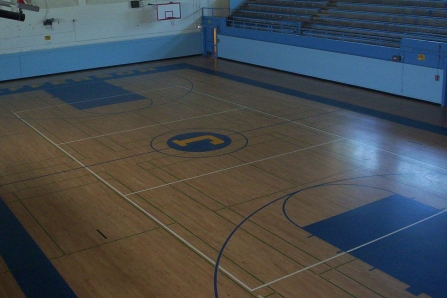
Inside Jefferson's gymnasium

=== Co-curricular clubs ===
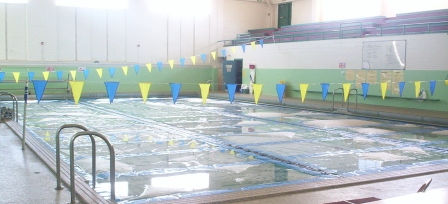
Jefferson's swimming pool

The following co-curricular clubs are hosted at Jefferson High School to complement the regular school curriculum.

=== Journalism ===
The Tom-Tom was Jefferson's student newspaper. It was published quarterly, usually in November, February, April and June.

The newspaper regularly participated in and had received awards in local (Peninsula Press Club), state (Journalism Education Association of Northern California) and national (Journalism Education Association/NSPA) conferences and competitions.

The Tom-Tom is currently inactive.

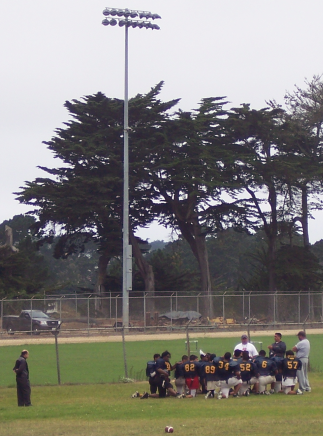
Football training with one of the "Madden Lights" in the background

=== Sports ===
Jefferson provides the following sports programs depending on the season:

- Fall/Winter: football, volleyball, basketball, soccer, cheerleading, cross country running
- Spring: badminton, baseball, softball, swimming, track

== Notable alumni ==
- Reggie Camp, 1979, former NFL player for the Cleveland Browns, Houston Oilers and Atlanta Falcons
- Tony Compagno, 1939, former NFL player for the Pittsburgh Steelers
- Frank Duncan, former NFL player for the San Diego Chargers
- E. Floyd Kvamme (class of1955), partner with Kleiner Perkins Caufield & Byers, co-chair, President's Council of Advisors on Science and Technology
- John Madden, 1954. NFL Hall of Fame coach, player, commentator
- Don Mossi, 1948, former MLB player with the Cleveland Indians and Detroit Tigers, made the All-Star team in 1957
- Edwin Mulitalo, 1992. NFL player with the Super Bowl XXXV Champion-Baltimore Ravens
- Ken Reitz, 1969, former MLB player who played for the St. Louis Cardinals, San Francisco Giants, Chicago Cubs, and Pittsburgh Pirates from 1972 to 1982

== See also ==
- San Mateo County high schools
