= Dakota State Trojans baseball =

- 2025 Dakota State Trojans baseball team
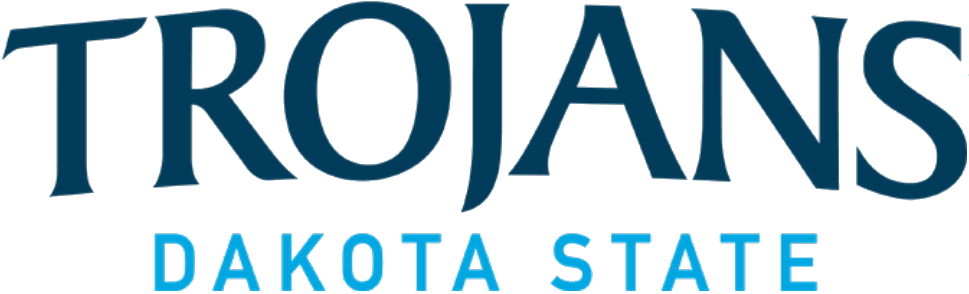
- University: Dakota State University
- Head coach: Derrion Hardie
- Conference: Frontier Conference
- Location: Madison, South Dakota
- Home stadium: Flynn Field
- Nickname: Trojans
- Colors: Trojan blue, DSU blue, and gray

Conference regular season champions
- 1984, 1985

The Dakota State Trojans baseball team represents Dakota State University, competing as a member of the North Star Athletic Association (NSAA) in the National Association of Intercollegiate Athletics (NAIA). During the 2025–26 academic year, the Trojans will be moving to the Frontier Conference. The Trojans play their home games at Flynn Field in Madison, South Dakota. Their current head coach is Derrion Hardie.

== History ==
=== Conference affiliations ===
- South Dakota Intercollegiate Conference (1961–1985*, 1989–2000)
- Dakota Athletic Conference (2000–2011)
- NAIA independent (2011–2013)
- North Star Athletic Association (2013–2025)
- Frontier Conference (2025–present)

* – Dakota State dropped their baseball program in 1985, but in 1989 it was reinstated.

== Conference championships ==
The Trojans have won 2 regular season championships.

South Dakota Intercollegiate Conference

- Regular season champion (2 times): 1984, 1985

== Coaches ==
=== Current Coaching Staff ===
Position	Name	Alma mater
Head Coach	Derrion Hardie	University of Sioux Falls
Assistant Coach	Dan Rutan	Oakland University
Assistant Coach	Jake Vitale	Quincy University
Graduate Assistant	Connor Raney	Dakota State University
Graduate Assistant	Emmot Nathan	Dakota Wesleyan University

== Venues ==
- Flynn Field (1961–present)

== Individual awards and honors ==
=== All-Americans ===
==== NAIA ====
- Rick Alfson (1972)
- Bryan Day (2003)
- Ryan Holthaus (2003)
- Brandon Jiles (2005)
- Jason Ciz (2005)
- Terry McGowan (2005)
- Dustin Ottens (2006)
- Shea Tonkin (2006)
- Greg Biagi (2007)

=== SDIC honors ===
All-Conference

- Dick Heiberger (1972)
- Rick Alfson (1972–73)
- Daryl Fletcher (1972–73)
- Jon Graves (1972–73)
- Ted Poncelet (1973)
- Keith Thomas (1973)
- Terry Kasperbauer (1976–77)
- Mike Miller (1977)
- Kim Nelson (1977)
- Brian Jacobsen (1980–81)
- Roger Mesteth (1982)
- Randy Schaefer (1982–83)
- Kirk Knight (1983–84)
- Scott Sanner (1983–84)
- Tim Asche (1983–85)
- Dennis Bierle (1984)
- Ken Karolevitz (1984–85)
- Mark Thomas (1984–85)
- Jim Fitzgerald (1985)
- Brian Relf (1985)
- Chad Hofer (1985)
- Scott Hortness (1985)
- John Francois (1985)
- Devin Alfson (1996–97)

=== DAC honors ===
All-Conference

- Travis Phelps (2002)
- Dallas Schneiderman (2002)
- Ryan Holthaus (2003–04)
- Bryan Day (2003)
- Asa Patterson (2003)
- George Strable (2003)
- Josh Cuffe (2003)
- Aaron Vogt (2003)
- Ricky Brown (2004)
- Terry McGowan (2005–06)
- Brandon Jiles (2005)
- Jason Ciz (2005–08)
- Josh Wells (2005)
- Jon Lieser (2005)
- Shea Tonkin (2005–07)
- Adam Beyer (2005)
- Dustin Ottens (2006–07)
- T.J. Schmidtke (2006)
- B.J. Comfort (2006)
- Aaron Anderson (2006)
- Nate Remer (2006–07)
- Andre Trahan (2006)
- Matt Burpee (2007–08)
- Greg Biagi (2007–08)
- Jeff Savas (2007–08)
- Kyle Young (2007)
- Josh Guild (2007–08)
- Nick Hardy (2007)
- Josh Tomlin (2007)
- Ryan Breitling (2007)
- Dan Rhodes (2008–09)
- David Morgan (2008)
- Mike Young (2008)
- Zach Weber (2009)
- Zane Roduner (2009–10)
- Josh Tiede (2009–10)
- Jared Donahue (2009–10)
- Hibraim Cordova (2009)
- Lincoln Gassman (2010)
- Donald Strand (2010)
- Nick Mutz (2010)
- Chance Hargrove (2011)

=== NSAA honors ===
All-Conference

- Zac Smith (2014)
- Jordan Hofer (2016)
- Ian Barker (2016)
- Jake Harris (2015–16)
- Samuel Drummond (2021)
- Chris Kropuenske (2021)
- Cole Westerlund (2022)
- Will Clair (2022)
- Chris Burke (2022)
- Kameron Bryant (2022)
- Grant Svikulis (2023)
- Mason Macaluso (2021–23)
- Luke Guest (2023)
- Sam Tyrpa (2023–24)
- Aidan Perry (2024)
- Ryan McDaniel (2021–24)
- JD Kirchner (2022–24)
- Walker Hultgren (2023–24)
- Jeremy Green (2023–24)
- Cory Brownson (2024)
- Cassidy Watt (2025)
- Nicholai Arbach (2025)

=== Frontier honors ===
First Team All–Frontier

- Cameron DeMaria (2026)
- Connor Raney (2026)

Second Team All–Frontier

- Cameron Kittridge (2026)

Freshman of the Year

- Ryland Carroll (2026)

Honorable Mention All–Frontier

- Camaron Haller (2026)
