= Edwin Mulitalo =

American football player and coach (born 1974)

No. 64
- Position: Guard

Personal information
- Born: September 1, 1974 (age 52); Daly City, California, U.S.
- Listed height: 6 ft 3 in (1.91 m)
- Listed weight: 345 lb (156 kg)

Career information
- High school: Jefferson (Daly City)
- College: Arizona
- NFL draft: 1999: 4th round, 129th overall pick

Career history

Playing
- Baltimore Ravens (1999–2006); Detroit Lions (2007–2008)

Coaching
- Southern Utah (2015) Assistant offensive line coach; Southern Virginia (2016) Defensive line coach; Southern Virginia (2017) Defensive coordinator; Southern Virginia (2018–2022) Head coach

Awards and highlights
- Super Bowl champion (XXXV); Second-team All-Pac-10 (1998)

Career NFL statistics
- Games played: 132
- Games started: 128
- Fumble recoveries: 5
- Stats at Pro Football Reference

Edwin Moliki Mulitalo (/ˌmuːliˈtɑːloʊ/; born September 1, 1974) is an American former football coach and player. He played professionally as a guard in the National Football League (NFL).

Mulitalo was selected by the Baltimore Ravens in the fourth round of the 1999 NFL draft. He played college football for the Arizona Wildcats. Mulitalo earned a Super Bowl ring with the Ravens in Super Bowl XXXV. He also played for the Detroit Lions. Mulitalo served as the head football coach at Southern Virginia University in Buena Vista, Virginia from 2018 to 2022.

== Early life ==
Mulitalo attended Jefferson High School (Daly City, CA) and was a letterman in football, wrestling, and track and field. Mulitalo graduated in 1992.

== College career ==
Mulitalo played his last two college years at the University of Arizona. Before that he was at Ricks College in Rexburg Idaho (now BYU-Idaho).

== NFL career ==
=== Baltimore Ravens ===
Making his National Football League debut as a guard for the Baltimore Ravens in 1999, Mulitalo quickly earned a starting spot. Mulitalo earned a Super Bowl ring when the Ravens won Super Bowl XXXV in the 2000 season. He played for Baltimore all the way to 2006.

=== Detroit Lions ===
Mulitalo was with the Detroit Lions for the next two years, being plagued by injuries. He was released following the 2008 season, having worn No. 64 through his entire NFL career.

== Coaching career ==
Mulitalo began his coaching career at Southern Utah University as a volunteer offensive line coach when the Thunderbirds won the Big Sky Conference championship in 2015. He was appointed defensive line coach at Southern Virginia University on February 26, 2016. He was promoted to head coach two years later on March 30, 2018. After the 2022 he was fired.

== Personal life ==
Mulitalo is a devout member of the Church of Jesus Christ of Latter-day Saints. He served a two-year LDS Mission in Idaho. Mulitalo and his wife, Laura, resided in Herriman, Utah with their four children, before moving to Samoan island of Upolu in 2012. He was employed as a teacher there.

Mulitalo was present during the Ravens Super Bowl XXXV reunion in 2010.

== Head coaching record ==
Year	Team	Overall	Conference	Standing	Bowl/playoffs
Southern Virginia Knights (New Jersey Athletic Conference) (2018)
2018	Southern Virginia	3–7	2–7	8th	
Southern Virginia Knights (Old Dominion Athletic Conference) (2019–2021)
2019	Southern Virginia	4–6	2–6	7th	
2020–21	Southern Virginia	1–3	0–3	7th	
Southern Virginia Knights (USA South Athletic Conference) (2021–2022)
2021	Southern Virginia	2–8	1–7	8th	
2022	Southern Virginia	1–9	1–6	T–7th	
Southern Virginia:		11–33	6–29		
Total:		11–33			
