= Southern Virginia University =

Private university in Buena Vista, Virginia, US

Coordinates: 37°44′25″N 79°21′01″W

- Former names: Bowling Green Female Seminary (1867–1920); Southern Seminary (1920–1992); Southern Virginia College (1992–2001)
- Motto: Learn that Life is Service
- Type: Private liberal arts college
- Established: 1867; 159 years ago
- Accreditation: SACS
- Endowment: $1.96 million (2021)
- President: Aaron Hale
- Faculty: 165
- Students: 936 (Fall 2024)
- Location: Buena Vista, Virginia, United States
- Campus: Rural, 155 acres (0.63 km^{2})
- Colors: Crimson and White
- Nickname: Knights
- Sporting affiliations: NCAA Division III — USA South Athletic Conference
- Website: svu.edu

Southern Virginia University (SVU) is a private liberal arts college in Buena Vista, Virginia. The college, though not officially affiliated with a particular faith, embraces the values of the Church of Jesus Christ of Latter-day Saints (LDS Church). It was founded in 1867 as a school for girls and is now a private four-year coeducational institution. The Carnegie Classification categorizes it as a very small baccalaureate-only college with an arts & sciences focus.

== History ==
The school was founded as a for-profit institution in 1867 during Virginia's post-Civil War era when Alice Scott Chandler established the Home School for Girls in Bowling Green, Virginia, later renamed the Bowling Green Female Seminary. In 1883, Edgar H. Rowe purchased the school and operated it with Mrs. Chandler as principal. Dr. Rowe moved the school to Buena Vista in 1900, and changed its name to Southern Seminary. It was located in the splendid Buena Vista Hotel, which had been built 10 years earlier to accommodate the large numbers of land speculators investigating the town's iron ore deposits. The iron boom was short-lived, however, and Rowe purchased the hotel. The original hotel still serves as Main Hall, the university's principal building, and holds a place of distinction on the National Register of Historic Places, on which it is listed as the Southern Seminary Main Building.

In 1919, Robert Lee Durham, former dean of Martha Washington College (which merged with Emory & Henry College), bought a half-interest in Southern Seminary and became the resident head of the school. An educator, lawyer, engineer, author and inventor, Durham strengthened the school's academic program. In 1922, Durham's daughter, Margaret, married H. Russell Robey, who purchased Rowe's remaining interest in the school and became its business manager and treasurer. Durham and Robey added college-level courses to the school's curriculum, and the first class of the new junior college program graduated in 1925. The period of greatest physical growth of the school, by then called Southern Seminary and Junior College, occurred during the presidency of Margaret Durham Robey, who succeeded her father upon his retirement in 1942. Facilities for art, early childhood education and home economics were added.

In 1959, the Robeys turned over the ownership of the college to a board of trustees and the institution changed from proprietary to nonprofit status. In 1961, the school ceased offering high school courses, and the name of the institution was changed to Southern Seminary Junior College. The academic program was expanded to allow students to begin careers after their two years at the school or to transfer to four-year colleges. "Sem" became a nationally recognized competitor in intercollegiate riding, winning numerous state, regional and national equestrian competitions. To avoid confusion, the name was again changed to Southern Virginia College for Women, which was shortened to Southern Virginia College in 1994 when male students were admitted.

In the late 1980s and early 1990s enrollment began to slip and the college became financially unstable, which led to a loss of regional accreditation in 1996.

In the spring of that year, Southern Virginia College's board of trustees transferred the school's assets and liabilities to a new board, many of whom were members of the LDS Church. The main figure in this reorganization was Glade Knight. In 2000 the school was accepted into pre-accreditation status by the American Academy for Liberal Education (AALE), which is separate from accreditation bodies, and was renamed Southern Virginia University in April 2001. In 2003 it was granted full accreditation by the AALE. In June 2010 the Commission on Colleges of the Southern Association of Colleges and Schools awarded initial candidacy to SVU. Two years later, in June 2012, the university received full regional accreditation.

On August 9, 2017, Southern Virginia University officially changed its school colors from green to crimson. On June 11, 2020, Southern Virginia University removed the name of Durham from its main academic building in the wake of the George Floyd protests, citing Durham's racist views. In the interim before a new name is chosen, that building has been temporarily titled the Academic Center.

== Campus ==
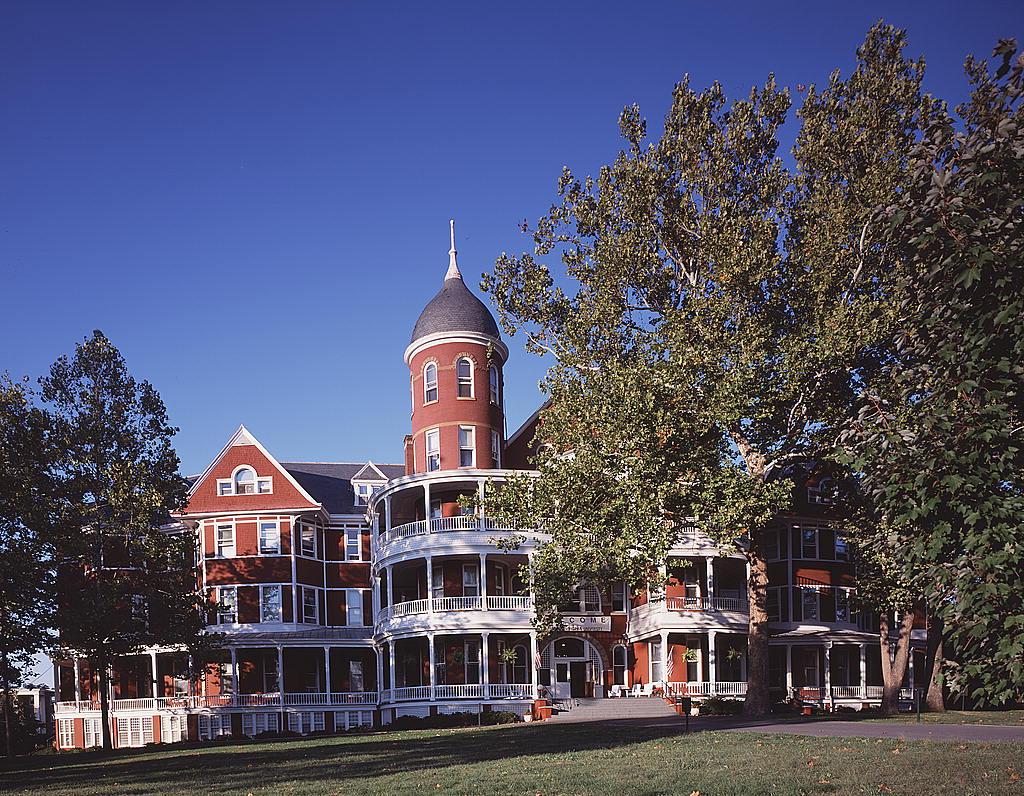
Main Hall

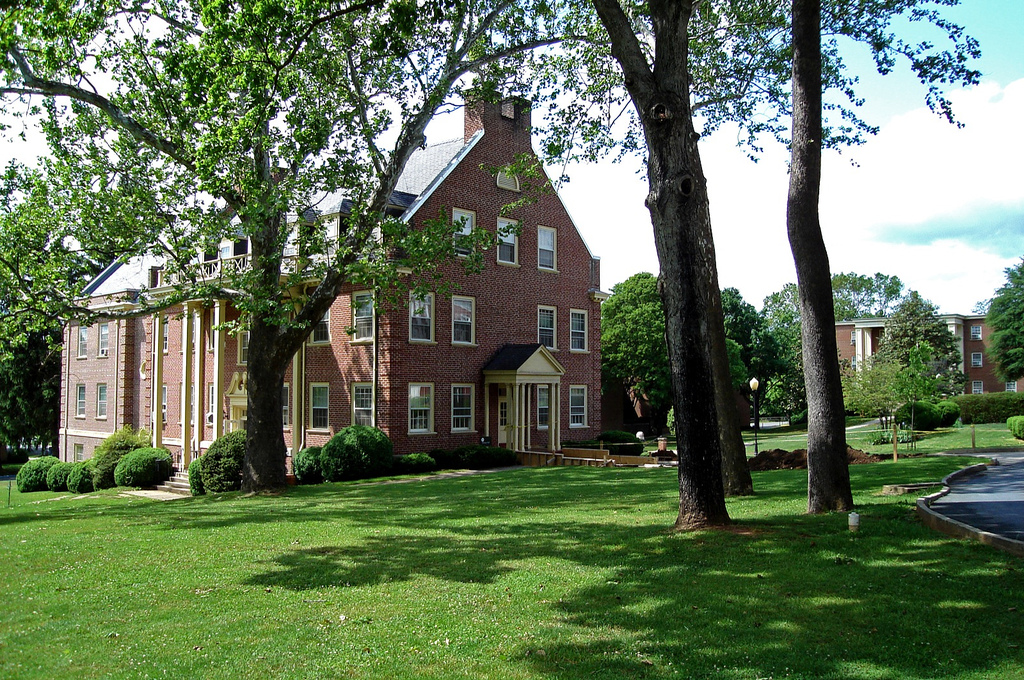
Academic Center

SVU's campus consists of twelve main buildings, including Main Hall (the most visible building on campus, used for administrative offices), the Kimball Student Center, the Knight Sports Arena, the Stoddard Center, the Von Canon Library, Landrum Hall, Robey Hall (men's residence hall), Craton Hall (women's residence hall), The Lofts (men's and women's residence hall), Walnut Avenue Apartments (men's and women's residence), Academic Center (the main academic building), and Chandler Hall (theatre and music). The campus area also includes several homes that are used for additional student housing and office space.

== Academics ==
SVU is accredited by the Southern Association of Colleges and Schools. SVU offers seventeen different majors and eighteen different minors. Other programs include Health Pre-Professionals, Army ROTC and Teaching Licensure.

== Student life ==
=== Religious activity ===
LDS Church principles and activities are fully integrated into life and education at SVU. An LDS Church Institute of Religion is operated on campus. Once each semester, SVU cancels classes for a service day on which the local LDS stake organizes an optional trip to the Washington D.C. Temple, where students perform service on the temple grounds and participate in temple ordinances. Students are not required to enroll in religious classes.

=== Code of Honor ===
SVU has a code of honor, intended to help students live by its core values, which includes the following guidelines:

- Honesty in academic and personal behavior
- Living a chaste and virtuous lifestyle
- Abstinence from alcohol and tobacco
- Respect for the rights and property of others
- Obedience to law and university policies
- Observation of university dress and grooming standards

An ecclesiastical endorsement to live the code of honor is part of the application process. This consists of students signing a compact in conjunction with their respective ecclesiastical leader.

=== Performing arts ===
SVU offers several performing arts sections to its students, including its premier choir Chamber Singers, a women's choir (Bella Voce), Men's Chorus, opera workshop, and a contemporary a cappella group Accolade (formerly The Fading Point). There is also a university Dance Company, which performs many different styles of dance at different functions throughout the year, including jazz, ballet, hip-hop, lyrical, modern, Irish and other ethnic styles. Music programs consist of an orchestra and flute choir. The theatre program has performed The Diary of Anne Frank, The Sound of Music, The Importance of Being Earnest, Seeking Higher Ground, and Beauty and the Beast, among many others. Another option for participation in theatre is the Shenanigans Comedy Troupe, an improv comedy group.

== Athletics ==
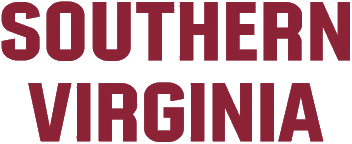
SVU athletics wordmark

Southern Virginia athletic teams are known as the Knights. The university is a member of the Division III level of the National Collegiate Athletic Association (NCAA), primarily competing in the USA South Athletic Conference for most of its sports since the 2021–22 academic year; while its men's volleyball team competes in the Continental Volleyball Conference (CVC) and it’s men’s wrestling team competes in the Old Dominion Athletic Conference (ODAC). The Knights previously competed in the Capital Athletic Conference (CAC; now known as the "Coast to Coast Athletic Conference" (C2C) since the 2020–21 school year) from 2013–14 to 2020–21; as well as a provisional NCAA D-III Independent during the 2012–13 school year. They also competed in the National Association of Intercollegiate Athletics (NAIA) and United States Collegiate Athletic Association (USCAA) from 1998–99 to 2012–13.

On April 28, 2025, the Southern Virginia men’s volleyball team swept Springfield at the Cregger Center in Salem, Virginia to win the 2025 NCAA Division III men's volleyball championship. It is the first NCAA championship in school history.

== Notable people ==
=== Faculty ===
- Jeff Benedict, sports writer
- Orson Scott Card, science fiction author (Ender's Game)
- Ed Mulitalo, former American football player who played in Super Bowl XXXV with the Baltimore Ravens
- Debra H. Sowell, former secretary and board member of the Society of Dance History Scholars

=== Alumni ===
- Beezie Madden, an American show jumping competitor and Olympic medalist
- Gustavo Ramos, Brazilian-American internationally renowned fine artist.
